= Tyrone Wallace =

American basketball player (born 1994)

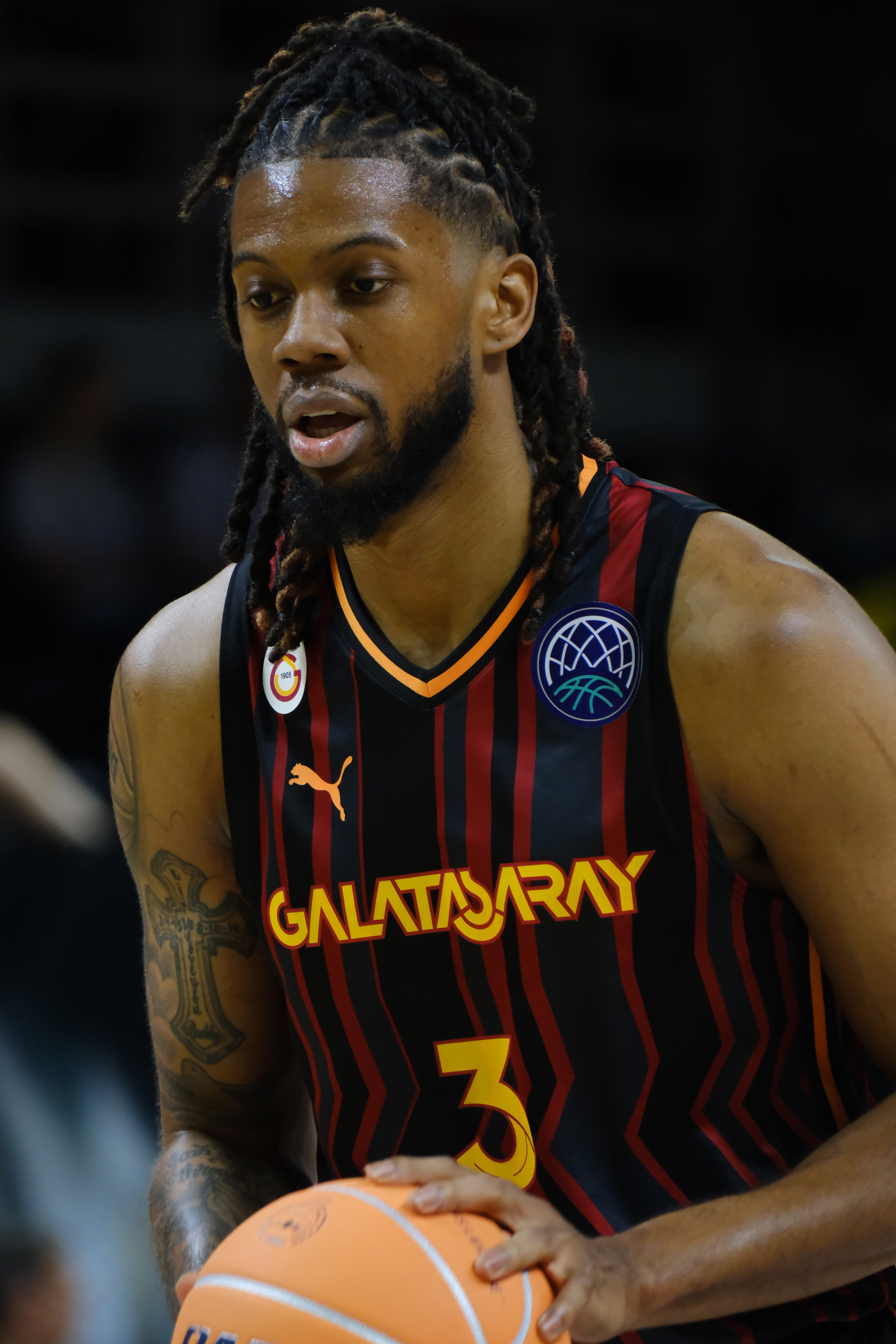

Free agent
- Position: Point guard / shooting guard

Personal information
- Born: June 10, 1994 (age 32) Bakersfield, California, U.S.
- Listed height: 6 ft 5 in (1.96 m)
- Listed weight: 189 lb (86 kg)

Career information
- High school: Bakersfield (Bakersfield, California)
- College: California (2012–2016)
- NBA draft: 2016: 2nd round, 60th overall pick
- Drafted by: Utah Jazz
- Playing career: 2016–present

Career history
- 2016–2017: Salt Lake City Stars
- 2017–2018: Agua Caliente Clippers
- 2018–2019: Los Angeles Clippers
- 2018–2019: →Agua Caliente Clippers
- 2019: Atlanta Hawks
- 2019: →College Park Skyhawks
- 2020–2021: Agua Caliente Clippers
- 2022: Long Island Nets
- 2022: New Orleans Pelicans
- 2022–2023: Paris Basketball
- 2023–2024: Türk Telekom
- 2024: Žalgiris
- 2025: Galatasaray

Career highlights
- First-team All-Pac-12 (2015)
- Stats at NBA.com
- Stats at Basketball Reference

Tyrone Tyrin Wallace (born June 10, 1994) is an American professional basketball player for Galatasaray of the Basketbol Süper Ligi (BSL). He played college basketball for the California Golden Bears. He was selected with the 60th pick of the 2016 NBA draft.

== High school career ==
Wallace attended Bakersfield High School, where he became his school's all-time scoring leader with 1,767 career points. He was also a two-time Bakersfield Californian Player of the Year, and in his senior season in 2012, he was a Second Team All-CIF selection. He was rated the 13th best point guard in the nation by Rivals.com and given a 4-star rating.

== College career ==
Wallace chose to attend the University of California, Berkeley, over several other schools, including Pac-12 rivals Oregon and Arizona State. Coach Mike Montgomery made him a starter just 10 games into his freshman year, and Wallace responded, averaging 7.2 points and 4.4 rebounds per game the rest of the season. The Bears made the NCAA tournament that year, upsetting a higher-ranked UNLV team before falling in the second round to Syracuse.

Wallace continued to make strides in his sophomore year, as he started every game but one and led the team in steals (44) and 3-pointers (43). By his junior season, Wallace had become a star, as he averaged 17.1 points, 7.1 rebounds, and 4 assists per game. He was named first-team All-Pac-12, and was a finalist for the Bob Cousy Award, given to the nation's top point guard. One of his many highlights included hitting a 3-pointer at the buzzer to give Cal a 70–69 victory over USC.

On April 23, 2015, Wallace announced that he would forgo the NBA draft and return to UC Berkeley for his senior season.

== Professional career ==
=== Salt Lake City Stars (2016–2017) ===
Wallace was taken by the Utah Jazz with the last pick of the 2016 NBA draft. In July 2016, he joined the Jazz for the 2016 NBA Summer League. On October 31, 2016, he was acquired by the Salt Lake City Stars, the Jazz's NBA Development League affiliate. He was waived on November 10 after suffering an injury. On November 14, he was reacquired by the Stars. On July 18, 2017, his right was reported to have been renounced, allowing Wallace to sign with any NBA team.

=== Agua Caliente Clippers (2017–2018) ===
On September 27, 2017, Wallace signed with the Los Angeles Clippers. After being one of the final cuts by the Clippers in preseason, he was signed to their G League affiliate, the Agua Caliente Clippers.

=== Los Angeles Clippers (2018–2019) ===
On January 5, 2018, after displaying some positive results in the Agua Caliente Clippers squad, the Los Angeles Clippers would sign Wallace to a two-way contract. Throughout the rest of the year, he would split his playing time between the Los Angeles squad and the Agua Caliente squad. On January 10, 2018, Wallace scored a career-high 22 points off the bench in the Clippers' 125–106 win at the Golden State Warriors.

On September 3, 2018, Wallace signed an offer sheet with the New Orleans Pelicans. Two days later, the Clippers exercised their right of first refusal and matched the offer sheet.

On July 6, 2019, Wallace was waived by the Clippers.

=== Atlanta Hawks (2019) ===
On July 8, 2019, Wallace was claimed off waivers by the Minnesota Timberwolves, however, he was waived on October 21. Two days later, he was claimed off waivers by the Atlanta Hawks. On December 14, he was waived.

=== Return to Agua Caliente (2020–2021) ===
On March 9, 2020, the Agua Caliente Clippers announced that they had acquired Wallace.

=== Long Island Nets / New Orleans Pelicans (2022) ===
On January 20, 2022, Wallace was traded from the Agua Caliente Clippers to the Long Island Nets. He was acquired and activated by the Nets the next day.

On March 11, 2022, the New Orleans Pelicans signed Wallace to a 10-day contract and on March 21, they signed him to a second 10-day contract. However, he was waived on March 28 and subsequently re-acquired by Long Island.

=== Paris Basketball (2022–2023) ===
On July 26, 2022, Wallace signed with Paris Basketball.

=== Türk Telekom (2023–2024) ===
On June 30, 2023, he signed with Türk Telekom of the Turkish Basketbol Süper Ligi (BSL).

=== Žalgiris Kaunas (2024) ===
On July 10, 2024, Wallace signed with Žalgiris Kaunas of the Lithuanian Basketball League (LKL) and the EuroLeague.

On October 18, 2024, Tyrone Wallace announced his departure from Kauno Žalgiris, following four EuroLeague appearances with the team. His exit came shortly after Žalgiris’ remarkable comeback victory against Olimpia Milano, a performance that was celebrated as one of the most significant in recent EuroLeague history. His departure was the result of the mutual termination of his contract for personal reasons and at the time he was considering retirement.

=== Galatasaray (2025) ===
On January 17, 2025, he signed with Galatasaray of the Basketbol Süper Ligi (BSL).

On June 20, 2025, Galatasaray thanked the player and announced that they had parted ways.

== Personal life ==
Wallace is the son of Tyrone Wallace Sr. and Michelle Wallace. He has a younger brother, Da’zion Wallace, and younger sister, Diamond Wallace, as well as an older brother, Ryan Carolina. He majored in Social Welfare.

== NBA career statistics ==
Legend
GP	Games played	GS	Games started	MPG	Minutes per game
FG%	Field goal percentage	3P%	3-point field goal percentage	FT%	Free throw percentage
RPG	Rebounds per game	APG	Assists per game	SPG	Steals per game
BPG	Blocks per game	PPG	Points per game	**Bold**	Career high

=== Regular season ===
Year	Team	GP	GS	MPG	FG%	3P%	FT%	RPG	APG	SPG	BPG	PPG
2017–18	L.A. Clippers	30	**19**	**28.4**	**.449**	**.250**	**.782**	**3.5**	**2.4**	**.9**	**.4**	**9.7**
2018–19	L.A. Clippers	**62**	0	10.1	.424	.211	.526	1.6	.7	.3	.1	3.5
2019–20	Atlanta	14	0	11.4	.318	.067	.647	1.6	.9	.5	.1	2.9
2021–22	New Orleans	6	0	12.5	.350	**.250**	.200	1.3	.2	.5	.2	2.8
Career		112	19	15.3	.422	.207	.656	2.1	1.1	.5	.2	5.1

=== Playoffs ===
Year	Team	GP	GS	MPG	FG%	3P%	FT%	RPG	APG	SPG	BPG	PPG
2019	L.A. Clippers	2	0	5.5	.250	–	.667	.5	1.5	.0	.0	2.0
Career		2	0	5.5	.250	–	.667	.5	1.5	.0	.0	2.0
