= Danilo Gallinari =

Italian basketball player (born 1988)

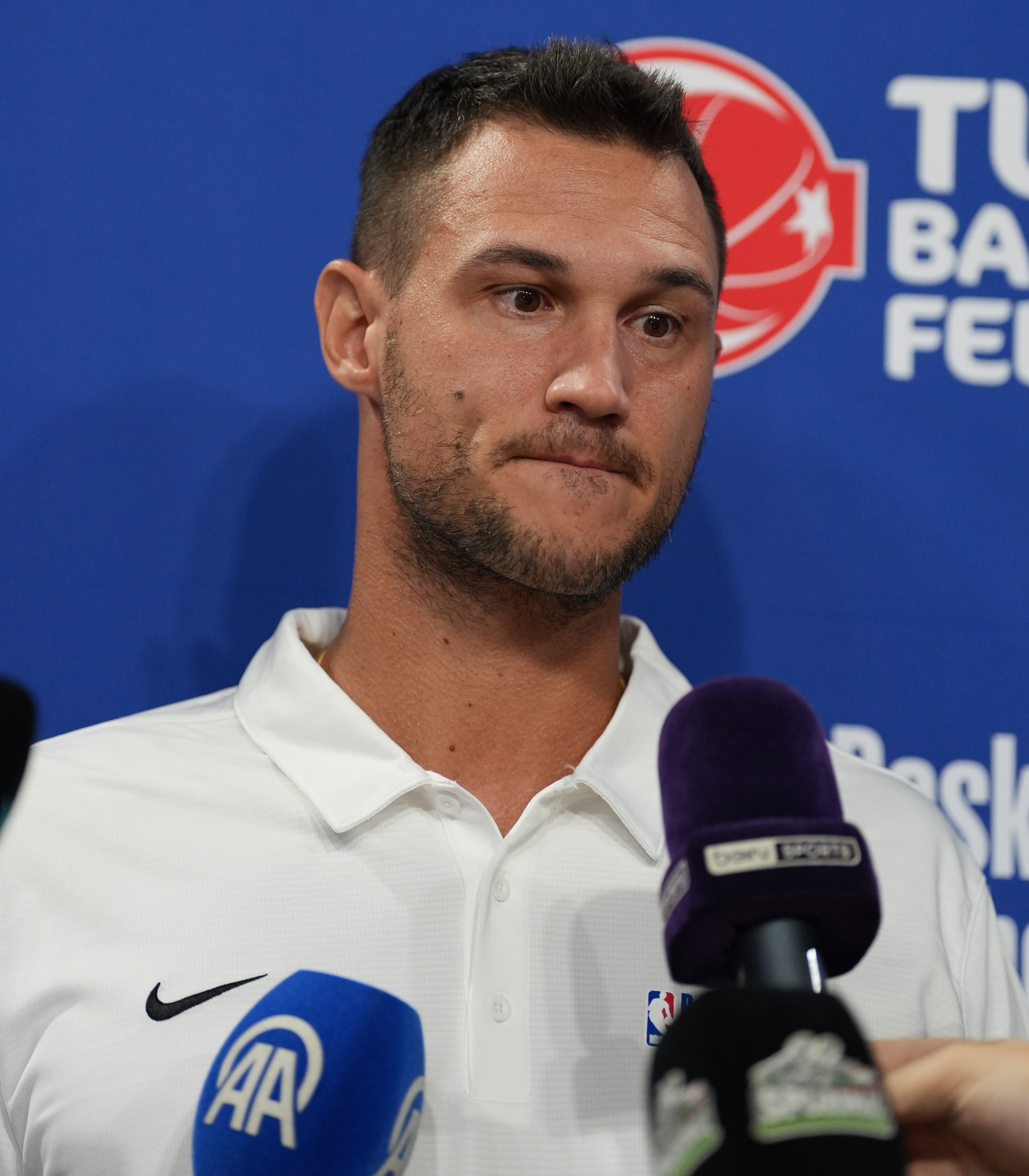
- Gallinari in 2026

Personal information
- Born: 8 August 1988 (age 38) Sant'Angelo Lodigiano, Italy
- Listed height: 6 ft 10 in (2.08 m)
- Listed weight: 236 lb (107 kg)

Career information
- NBA draft: 2008: 1st round, 6th overall pick
- Drafted by: New York Knicks
- Playing career: 2004–2025
- Position: Small forward / power forward
- Number: 8, 12, 88

Career history
- 2004–2005: Casalpusterlengo
- 2005–2008: Olimpia Milano
- 2005–2006: →Nuova Pavia
- 2008–2011: New York Knicks
- 2011–2017: Denver Nuggets
- 2011: Olimpia Milano
- 2017–2019: Los Angeles Clippers
- 2019–2020: Oklahoma City Thunder
- 2020–2022: Atlanta Hawks
- 2023–2024: Washington Wizards
- 2024: Detroit Pistons
- 2024: Milwaukee Bucks
- 2025: Vaqueros de Bayamón

Career highlights
- EuroLeague Rising Star (2008); Italian League MVP (2008); 2× Italian League Best Youth Player (2007, 2008); BSN champion (2025); BSN Finals MVP (2025)

Career NBA statistics
- Points: 11,607 (14.9 ppg)
- Rebounds: 3,618 (4.7 rpg)
- Assists: 1,469 (1.9 apg)
- Stats at NBA.com
- Stats at Basketball Reference
Medals
Men's basketball
Representing Italy
FIBA Europe U20 Championship
| Bronze medal – third place | 2007 Italy |
FIBA Europe U18 Championship
| Bronze medal – third place | 2005 Serbia and Montenegro | U-18 Team |

Danilo Gallinari (Italian pronunciation: [daˈniːlo ɡalliˈnaːri]; born 8 August 1988) is an Italian former professional basketball player who played 14 seasons in the National Basketball Association (NBA). After spending his first four years as a professional in his native Italy, Gallinari was drafted sixth overall in the 2008 NBA draft by the New York Knicks. He played with the Knicks for two and a half seasons before being traded to the Denver Nuggets in 2011.

Over the course of 16 seasons in the NBA, Gallinari also played for the Los Angeles Clippers, the Oklahoma City Thunder, the Atlanta Hawks, the Washington Wizards, and the Detroit Pistons.

== Professional career ==
=== Casalpusterlengo (2004–2005) ===
Gallinari started playing professionally in 2004 for Casalpusterlengo, a team in Serie B1 (third level in Italy).

=== Edimes Pavia (2005–2006) ===
In 2005, Gallinari was acquired by Armani Jeans Milano, which then sent him to Edimes Pavia, a team competing in the Italian league second division championship during the 2005–2006 season, so that he could earn more experience with extended playing minutes. Even though he played only half of the season due to an injury, in 2006, he was nominated as the best Italian player of the Italian league second division championship, averaging 14.3 points, 3.4 rebounds, 2.0 steals, and 0.8 assists in 17 games.

=== Olimpia Milano (2006–2008) ===
In 2006, Gallinari was recalled by Olimpia Milano to play in the 2006–07 Serie A season and also in the ULEB Cup. In his first season in Serie A, Gallinari was named as the league's best player under the age of 22, averaging 10.9 points, 4.0 rebounds, 1.7 steals, and 1.0 assists per game in 34 regular season games and 11.5 points, 3.7 rebounds, 2.1 steals, and 0.9 assists per game in 8 playoff games. During the season, he also won the 2007 Italian All-Star Game 3-point shootout contest.

He spent his last season with Milano in the top Italian league, finishing first in the league's overall efficiency ratings. During the 2007–2008 season, he averaged 17.5 points, 5.6 rebounds, 2.0 steals, and 1.3 assists per game in 33 regular season games and 18.1 points, 6.5 rebounds, 1.8 steals and 1.5 assists per game in 8 playoff games.

In the 2007–08 season, he played for the first time in the EuroLeague, where he averaged 14.9 points, 4.2 rebounds, 1.7 assists, and 1.5 steals per game in 11 games. He posted a season-high 27 points against Maccabi Tel Aviv in his final game, and at the end of the season was named the EuroLeague's Rising Star.

=== New York Knicks (2008–2011) ===
Gallinari's contract with Olimpia Milano had an escape clause for playing professionally in the United States, effectively eliminating major encumbrances that would have prevented him from joining the National Basketball Association (NBA). On 23 April 2008, he decided to declare himself eligible for the 2008 NBA draft. Gallinari signed an endorsement deal with Reebok before being drafted into the NBA. He has his own sneaker, made by Reebok, called "The Rooster."

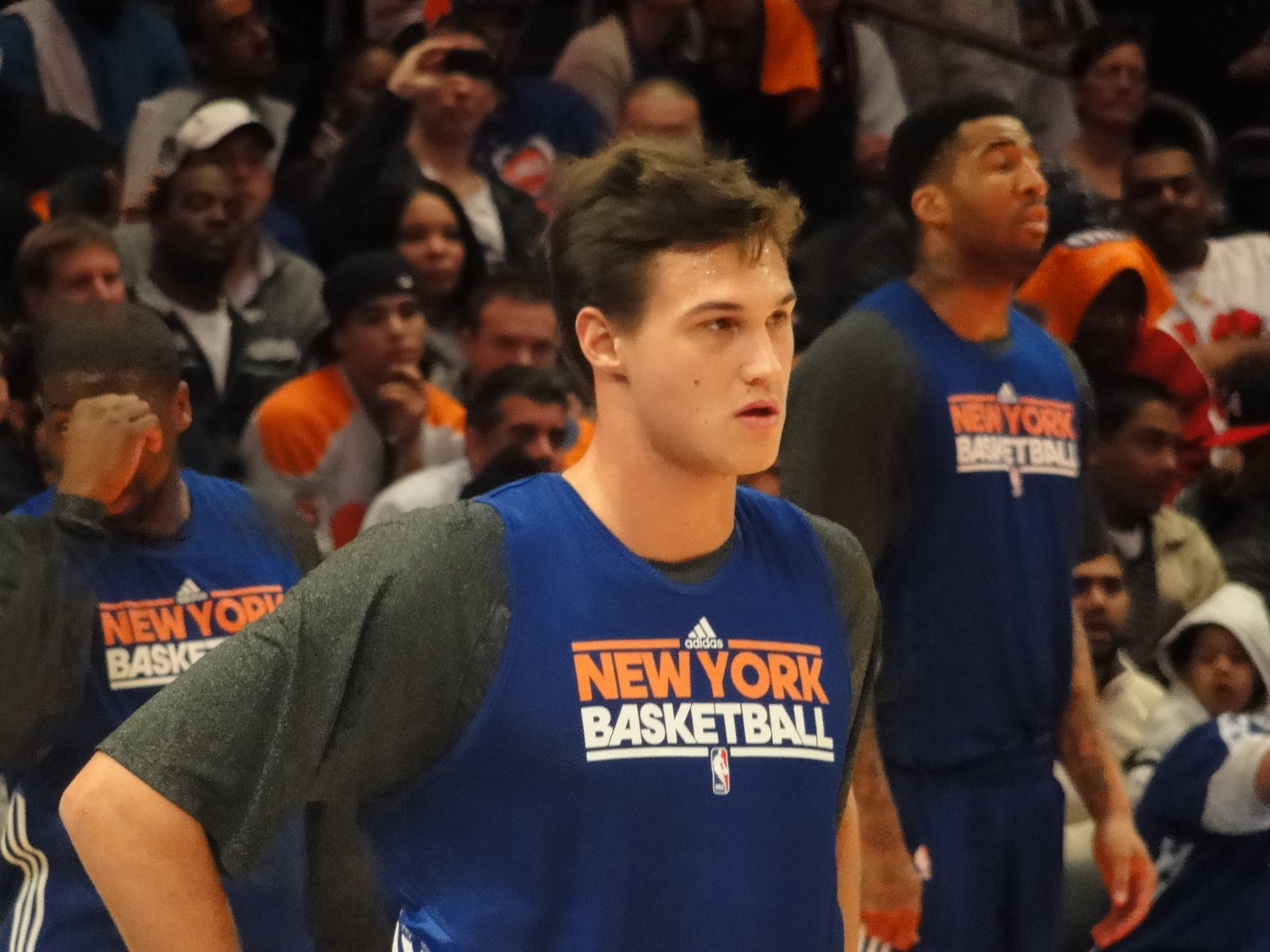
Gallinari training with the Knicks

Gallinari was drafted sixth overall in the 2008 draft by the New York Knicks. He then signed a two-year contract with the team.

Just one game into the 2008–09 season, it was announced that Gallinari would most likely miss most of the remainder of the season due to back problems. Despite his back problems, he came back into play on 17 January, during a game the Knicks lost to Philadelphia. On 4 March, Gallinari scored a season-high 17 points against the Atlanta Hawks, shooting 4–5 on three-point field goal attempts.

On 23 October 2009, the Knicks picked up Gallinari's contract option.

With the Knicks freeing up roster space for Gallinari with the trade of Quentin Richardson, and with Al Harrington being relegated to the bench, head coach Mike D'Antoni named Gallinari a starter two games into the 2009 NBA season. On 31 October 2009, the third game of the 2009 season, Gallinari scored a career-high 30 points and made eight three-pointers in an overtime loss to the Philadelphia 76ers, one short of tying a Knicks franchise record held by Latrell Sprewell and John Starks. Gallinari set a new career high on 6 April 2010, with 31 points in a 104–101 win over the Boston Celtics.

=== Denver Nuggets (2011–2017) ===
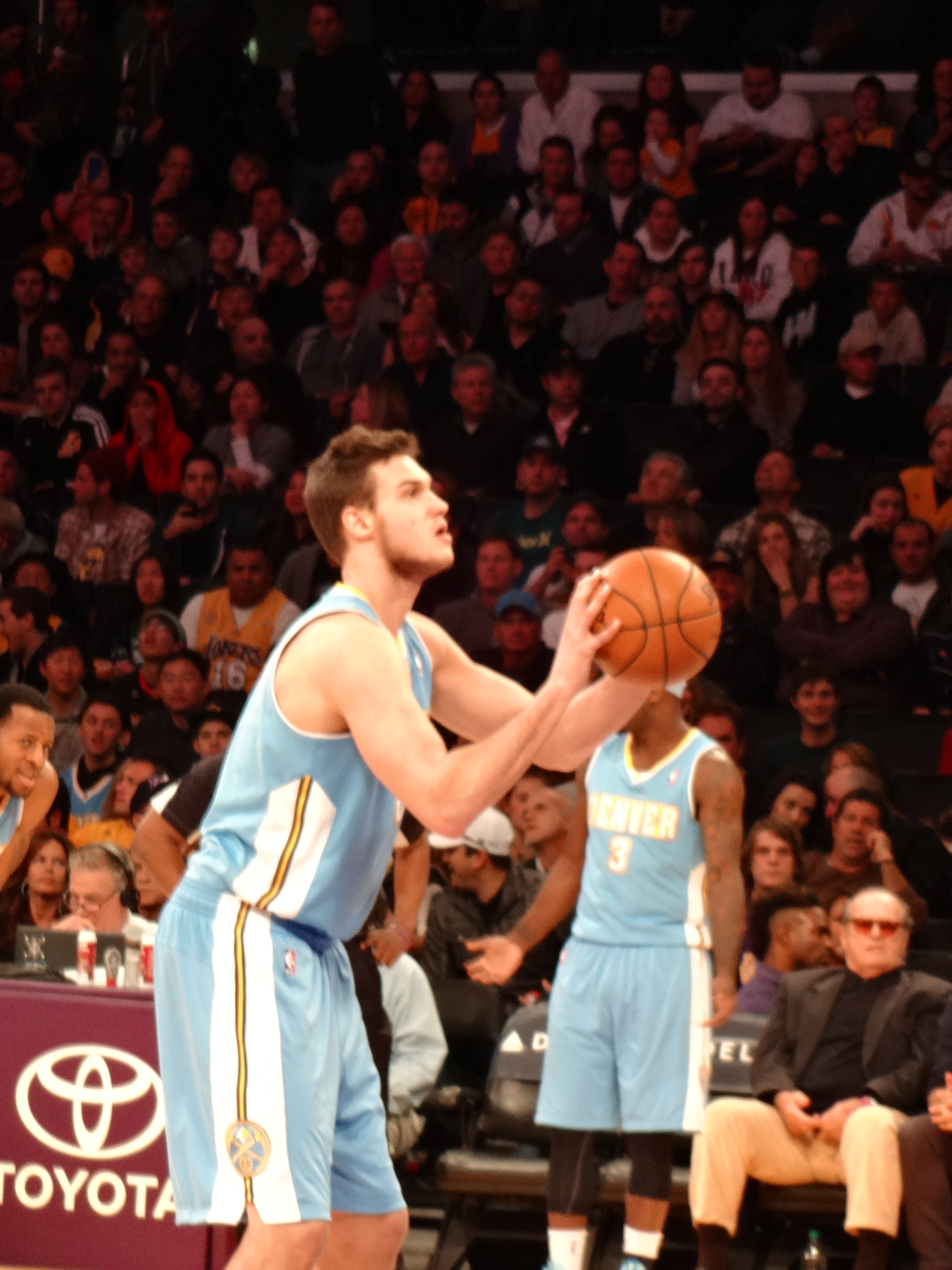
Gallinari shooting a free throw for the Denver Nuggets in 2013

On 22 February 2011, Gallinari was traded to the Denver Nuggets in a three-team trade, which also involved the Minnesota Timberwolves, that brought Carmelo Anthony and Chauncey Billups to New York. In just his second game with the Nuggets, he almost matched his career high with a 30-point effort in an overtime loss against the Portland Trail Blazers.

During the 2011 NBA lockout he returned to Italy to play for Emporio Armani Milan. On 25 January 2012, Gallinari signed a four-year, $42 million contract extension with the Nuggets. On 5 April 2013, it was announced that Gallinari would miss the remainder of the 2012–13 season because of an ACL injury. The same injury forced him out of the entire 2013–14 season as well.

On 29 October 2014, Gallinari made his return for the Nuggets, scoring seven points on 1-of-8 shooting in a season opening win over the Detroit Pistons. On 22 March 2015, Gallinari scored a career-high 40 points on 12-of-21 shooting in a 119–100 win over the Orlando Magic. Gallinari later eclipsed his career high with 47 points in a double overtime loss to the Dallas Mavericks on 10 April.

On 3 August 2015, Gallinari signed a two-year, $34 million contract extension with the Nuggets. On 17 November 2015, he scored a season-high 32 points in a 115–98 win over the New Orleans Pelicans. On 5 February 2016, he set a new season high with 33 points in a 115–110 win over the Chicago Bulls. Gallinari missed the final 22 games of the season due to an ankle injury. On 9 April 2017, Gallinari scored 22 of his season-high 34 points in the third quarter of the Nuggets' 106–105 loss to the Oklahoma City Thunder.

=== Los Angeles Clippers (2017–2019) ===
On 6 July 2017, the Los Angeles Clippers signed Gallinari to a three-year, $64.8 million contract via sign-and-trade with the Denver Nuggets as part of a three-team trade that sent Jamal Crawford, Diamond Stone and the Clippers' 2018 protected first round draft pick (via Houston) to the Atlanta Hawks and a 2019 second round draft pick from Atlanta (via Washington) to Denver. In his debut for the Clippers in their season opener on October 19, Gallinari scored 11 points in a 108–92 win over the Los Angeles Lakers. On 6 December, Gallinari returned to action against the Minnesota Timberwolves after missing a month due to a glute injury. On 20 December, he was ruled out until at least January with a partial tear of his left glute muscle. On 5 February 2018, he scored 28 points in a 104–101 win over the Dallas Mavericks. On 27 February, he was once again ruled out due to a non-displaced fracture to his right hand.

In March 2019, Gallinari scored 20 or more points in nine straight games, marking the best scoring streak of his career.

=== Oklahoma City Thunder (2019–2020) ===
On 10 July 2019, the Clippers traded Gallinari, Shai Gilgeous-Alexander, five first-round draft picks, and the rights to swap two other first-round picks to the Oklahoma City Thunder for NBA All-Star player Paul George. On 4 August 2019, it was reported that Gallinari underwent an appendectomy.

=== Atlanta Hawks (2020–2022) ===
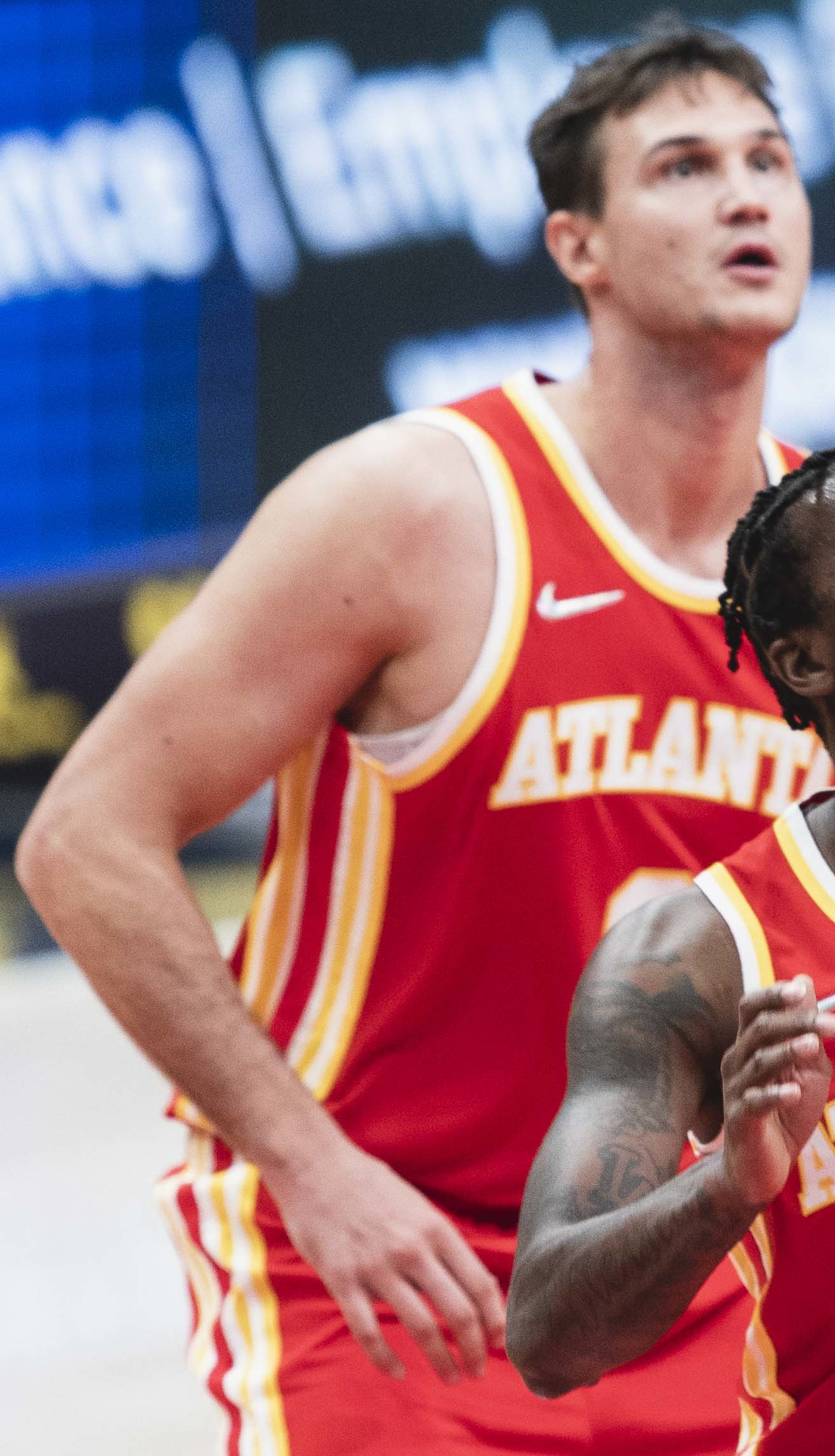
Gallinari with the Atlanta Hawks in 2021

On 24 November 2020, Gallinari signed a three-year, $61.4 million contract with the Atlanta Hawks in exchange for a conditional 2025 second-round pick in a sign-and-trade deal. On February 24, 2021, Gallinari scored 38 points and hit a career-high and Hawks record 10 threes against the Celtics. During Game 7 of the 2021 Eastern Conference Semifinals against the Philadelphia 76ers, Gallinari came up in the final minute with a key steal from Joel Embiid and a dunk, extending Atlanta's lead to six, as the Hawks reached their first Eastern Conference Final since 2015 and only their second since moving to Atlanta in 1968.

=== Boston Celtics (2022–2023) ===
On 30 June 2022, Gallinari was traded, alongside multiple future first-round picks, to the San Antonio Spurs in exchange for Dejounte Murray and Jock Landale. On 8 July, Gallinari was waived by the Spurs. On 12 July 2022, Gallinari signed a two-year, $13.3M deal with the Boston Celtics. On September 2, Gallinari suffered a torn ACL in his left knee, and missed the entire season. As a result of his injury, and a trade preceding the 2023–24 season, Gallinari was not able to see the court during his time with the Boston Celtics.

=== Washington Wizards (2023–2024) ===
On 23 June 2023, the Celtics traded Gallinari to the Washington Wizards as part of a three–team deal involving the Memphis Grizzlies. The Wizards received Gallinari, Mike Muscala, and the No.35 overall pick in the 2023 NBA draft from Boston as well as Tyus Jones from Memphis in exchange for Kristaps Porziņģis who landed in Boston. Additionally, Boston received the No. 25 overall pick in the 2023 NBA draft and a 2024 first round pick (via GSW) from Memphis, while the Grizzlies acquired Marcus Smart.

=== Detroit Pistons (2024) ===
On 14 January 2024, Gallinari was traded to the Detroit Pistons, along with Mike Muscala, in exchange for Marvin Bagley III, Isaiah Livers and future draft considerations. On 9 February, he was waived by the Pistons.

=== Milwaukee Bucks (2024) ===
On February 21, 2024, Gallinari signed with the Milwaukee Bucks.

=== Vaqueros de Bayamón (2025) ===
On 22 January 2025, Gallinari signed with the Vaqueros de Bayamón of the Baloncesto Superior Nacional, marking his return to professional basketball following his departure from the NBA. During the season, he played alongside fellow former NBA players JaVale McGee, Chris Duarte, and Renaldo Balkman.

On 11 June 2025, Gallinari delivered one of his best regular-season performances, scoring 39 points on 13-of-18 shooting from the field, including four three-pointers, while converting nine of his ten free-throw attempts. His performances earned him selection to the 2025 BSN All-Star Game, where he represented the international players and recorded 15 points, including three three-pointers.

Gallinari continued his strong performances during the postseason, helping Bayamón advance to the BSN Finals against the Leones de Ponce. In Game 3 of the championship series, he recorded 31 points, eight rebounds, and six assists, shooting 10-of-15 from the field and five-of-six from three-point range, as Bayamón defeated Ponce 100–79.

On 11 August 2025, Gallinari helped the Vaqueros secure their 17th BSN championship, defeating Ponce 82–68 in Game 5 to win the series 4–1. In the championship victory, he led the team with 24 points, six rebounds, and four assists. He was subsequently named BSN Finals Most Valuable Player, having averaged 26.3 points, 6.5 rebounds, and 4.0 assists throughout the championship series.

The championship marked the first professional team title of Gallinari’s career, achieved at the age of 37 after a lengthy career in European basketball and the NBA. His individual achievements during the season also included recognition as the BSN Forward of the Year and selection to the league’s All-BSN First Team.

On 2 December 2025, nearly four months after winning his first professional championship, Gallinari officially announced his retirement from professional basketball at the age of 37, bringing his playing career to a close following his championship winning season with Bayamón.

== Career statistics ==
Legend
| GP | Games played | GS | Games started | MPG | Minutes per game |
| FG% | Field-goal percentage | 3P% | 3-point field-goal percentage | FT% | Free-throw percentage |
| RPG | Rebounds per game | APG | Assists per game | SPG | Steals per game |
| BPG | Blocks per game | PPG | Points per game | PIR | Performance index rating |
| **Bold** | Career high |

=== NBA ===
==== Regular season ====
| Year | Team | GP | GS | MPG | FG% | 3P% | FT% | RPG | APG | SPG | BPG | PPG |
|---|---|---|---|---|---|---|---|---|---|---|---|---|
| 2008–09 | New York | 28 | 2 | 14.7 | .448 | .444 | **.963** | 2.0 | .5 | .5 | .1 | 6.1 |
| 2009–10 | New York | **81** | **74** | 33.9 | .423 | .381 | .818 | 4.9 | 1.7 | .9 | **.7** | 15.1 |
| 2010–11 | New York | 48 | 48 | **34.8** | .415 | .347 | .893 | 4.8 | 1.7 | .8 | .4 | 15.9 |
| 2010–11 | Denver | 14 | 12 | 30.9 | .412 | .370 | .772 | 5.4 | 1.6 | .9 | .6 | 14.7 |
| 2011–12 | Denver | 43 | 40 | 31.4 | .414 | .328 | .871 | 4.7 | **2.7** | **1.0** | .5 | 14.6 |
| 2012–13 | Denver | 71 | 71 | 32.5 | .418 | .373 | .822 | 5.2 | 2.5 | .9 | .5 | 16.2 |
| 2014–15 | Denver | 59 | 27 | 24.2 | .401 | .355 | .895 | 3.7 | 1.4 | .8 | .3 | 12.4 |
| 2015–16 | Denver | 53 | 53 | 34.7 | .410 | .364 | .868 | 5.3 | 2.5 | .8 | .4 | 19.5 |
| 2016–17 | Denver | 63 | 63 | 33.9 | .447 | .388 | .902 | 5.1 | 2.1 | .6 | .2 | 18.2 |
| 2017–18 | L.A. Clippers | 21 | 21 | 32.0 | .398 | .324 | .931 | 4.8 | 2.0 | .6 | .5 | 15.3 |
| 2018–19 | L.A. Clippers | 68 | 68 | 30.3 | .463 | .433 | .904 | **6.1** | 2.6 | .7 | .3 | **19.8** |
| 2019–20 | Oklahoma City | 62 | 62 | 29.6 | .438 | .405 | .893 | 5.2 | 1.9 | .7 | .1 | 18.7 |
| 2020–21 | Atlanta | 51 | 4 | 24.0 | .434 | .406 | .925 | 4.1 | 1.5 | .6 | .2 | 13.3 |
| 2021–22 | Atlanta | 66 | 18 | 25.3 | .434 | .381 | .904 | 4.7 | 1.5 | .4 | .2 | 11.7 |
| 2023–24 | Washington | 26 | 0 | 14.8 | .435 | .313 | .839 | 2.9 | 1.2 | .2 | .1 | 7.0 |
| 2023–24 | Detroit | 6 | 0 | 14.9 | **.545** | **.583** | .875 | 2.3 | 2.0 | .3 | .3 | 8.7 |
| 2023–24 | Milwaukee | 17 | 0 | 9.1 | .378 | .176 | .889 | 1.1 | .7 | .4 | .1 | 2.8 |
| Career | | 777 | 563 | 28.8 | .428 | .381 | .876 | 4.7 | 1.9 | .7 | .3 | 14.9 |

==== Playoffs ====
| Year | Team | GP | GS | MPG | FG% | 3P% | FT% | RPG | APG | SPG | BPG | PPG |
|---|---|---|---|---|---|---|---|---|---|---|---|---|
| 2011 | Denver | 5 | 5 | 29.5 | .432 | **.467** | .714 | 3.4 | 2.0 | .8 | .0 | 12.0 |
| 2012 | Denver | 7 | **7** | 31.6 | .362 | .174 | .917 | 5.1 | 2.4 | .7 | **.6** | 13.4 |
| 2019 | L.A. Clippers | 6 | 6 | **33.6** | .351 | .302 | .848 | **6.2** | **2.7** | **1.3** | .2 | **19.8** |
| 2020 | Oklahoma City | 7 | **7** | 30.3 | .405 | .324 | .967 | 5.4 | 1.0 | .7 | .1 | 15.0 |
| 2021 | Atlanta | **18** | 0 | 24.6 | .425 | .405 | .942 | 3.9 | .8 | .3 | .2 | 12.8 |
| 2022 | Atlanta | 5 | 3 | 22.3 | .400 | .267 | **1.000** | 4.2 | .8 | .2 | .0 | 10.2 |
| 2024 | Milwaukee | 3 | 0 | 12.4 | **.500** | .000 | .750 | 3.0 | .7 | .0 | .0 | 3.7 |
| Career | | 51 | 28 | 26.9 | .396 | .338 | .897 | 4.5 | 1.4 | .6 | .2 | 13.2 |

=== EuroLeague ===
| Year | Team | GP | GS | MPG | FG% | 3P% | FT% | RPG | APG | SPG | BPG | PPG | PIR |
|---|---|---|---|---|---|---|---|---|---|---|---|---|---|
| 2005–06 | Olimpia Milano | 1 | 0 | 2.3 | .000 | .000 | .000 | .0 | .0 | .0 | .0 | .0 | 1.0 |
| 2007–08 | Olimpia Milano | **11** | **11** | **31.7** | **.420** | **.318** | **.781** | 4.2 | **1.7** | **1.5** | **.4** | 14.9 | 17.2 |
| 2011–12 | Olimpia Milano | 7 | 2 | 28.3 | .406 | .267 | .753 | **4.4** | 1.1 | .7 | **.4** | **16.4** | **19.3** |
| Career | | 19 | 13 | 25.6 | .413 | .293 | .796 | 4.1 | 1.4 | 1.1 | .4 | 14.7 | 17.1 |

== National team career ==
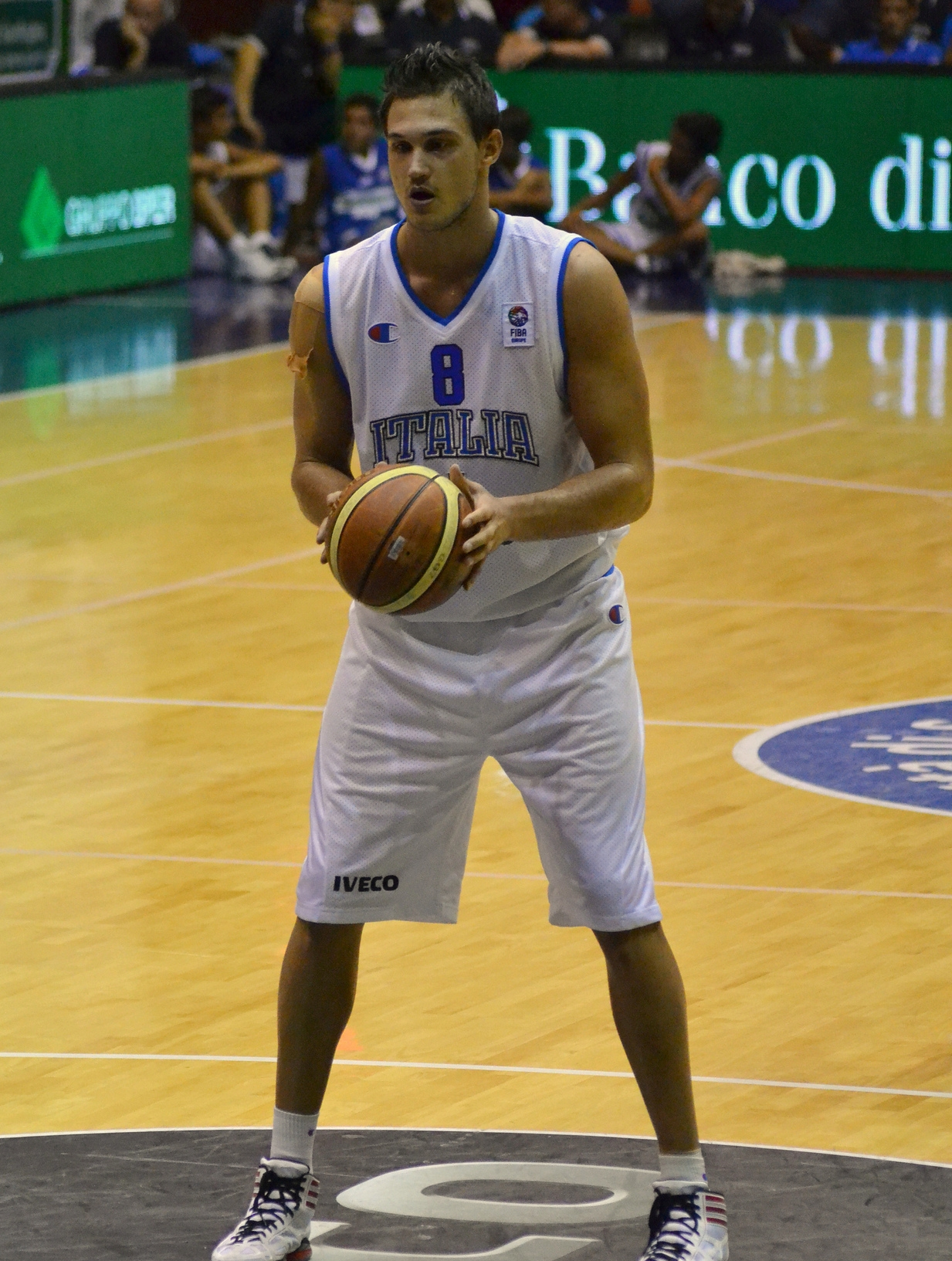
Gallinari with Italy in 2012

Gallinari was a member of the Under-16 and Under-18 Italian national teams. He played at the 2004 FIBA Europe Under-16 Championship and won the bronze medal at the 2005 FIBA Europe Under-18 Championship. He was later selected for the senior national team to play in EuroBasket 2007, but was forced to withdraw due to an injury that he suffered in preparation before the tournament. He was called up to the squad that would take part in EuroBasket 2015.

== Personal life ==
Gallinari's father, Vittorio Gallinari, played professional basketball with Olimpia Milano (along with future head coach Mike D'Antoni), Pallacanestro Pavia, Virtus Bologna, and Scaligera Basket Verona in the Italian league.

According to multiple sources, before Kim Kardashian began dating Kris Humphries, she was extremely interested in dating Gallinari, who was told that such a move would be good for his career and that he would garner lots of media exposure. Gallinari declined, saying he would be happy to meet Kardashian but wasn't interested in dating her.

Aside from basketball, Gallinari has worked as a model for Armani.

== See also ==
- List of European basketball players in the United States
- List of National Basketball Association career free throw percentage leaders
