= Jerome Robinson =

American basketball player (born 1997)

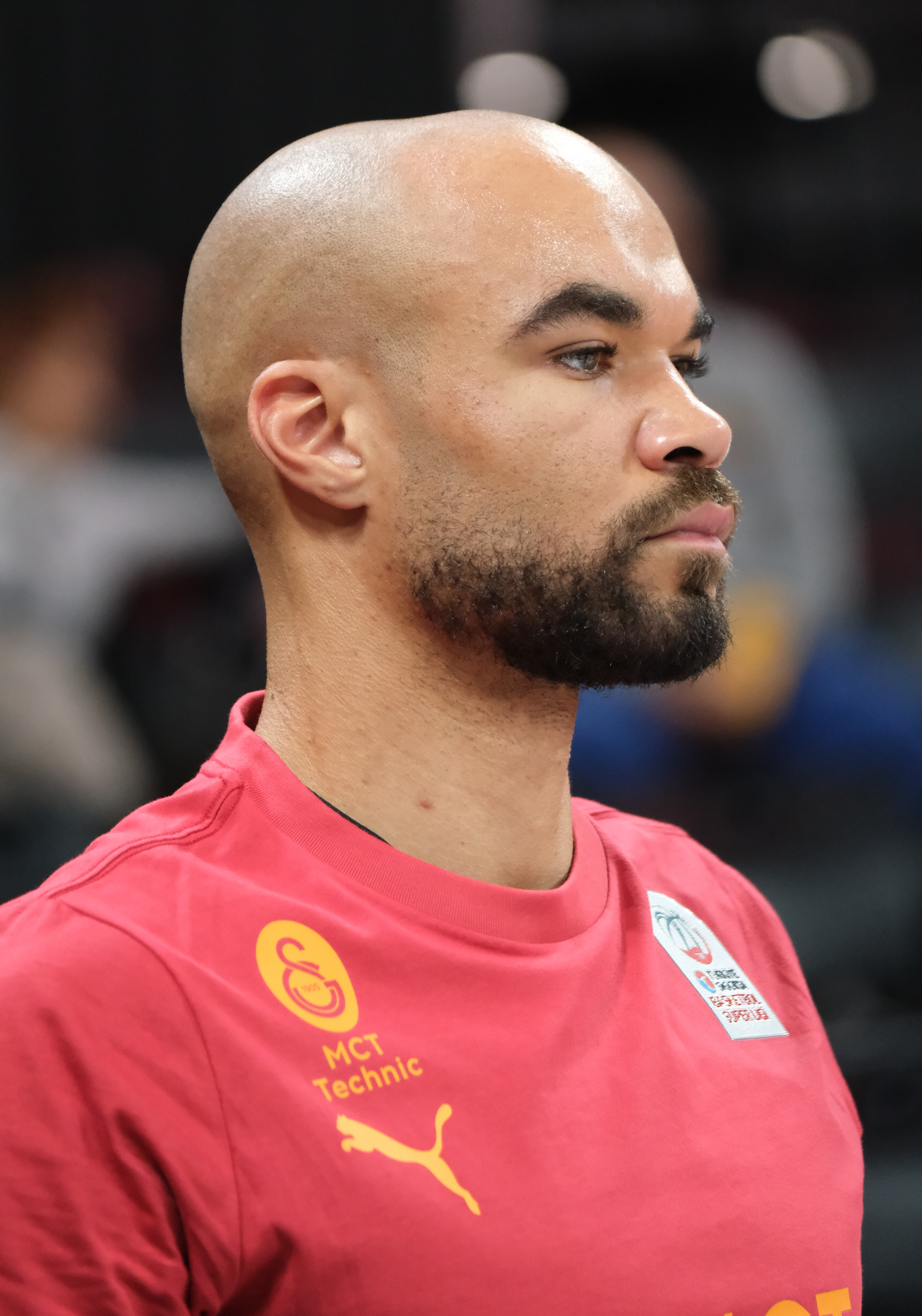
- Robinson with Galatasaray in 2025

No. 1 – Galatasaray
- Position: Small forward / shooting guard
- League: BSL; BCL

Personal information
- Born: February 22, 1997 (age 29) Raleigh, North Carolina, U.S.
- Listed height: 6 ft 5 in (1.96 m)
- Listed weight: 190 lb (86 kg)

Career information
- High school: Needham B. Broughton (Raleigh, North Carolina)
- College: Boston College (2015–2018)
- NBA draft: 2018: 1st round, 13th overall pick
- Drafted by: Los Angeles Clippers
- Playing career: 2018–present

Career history
- 2018–2020: Los Angeles Clippers
- 2018–2019: →Agua Caliente Clippers
- 2020–2021: Washington Wizards
- 2022–2023: Santa Cruz Warriors
- 2023–2024: Golden State Warriors
- 2023–2024: →Santa Cruz Warriors
- 2024–2025: Saint-Quentin
- 2025–present: Galatasaray

Career highlights
- First-team All-ACC (2018)
- Stats at NBA.com
- Stats at Basketball Reference

Jerome Robinson (born February 22, 1997) is an American professional basketball player for Galatasaray of the Basketbol Süper Ligi (BSL) and the Basketball Champions League (BCL). He played college basketball with the Boston College Eagles. He was selected by the Los Angeles Clippers in the first round of the 2018 NBA draft with the 13th overall pick.

== College career ==
Robinson was not ranked as a high school recruit and had trouble receiving offers from Power-5 programs from Needham B. Broughton High School in Raleigh, North Carolina. Boston College assistant coach Scott Spinelli, who is known for finding diamonds in the rough, was the only representative of a Power-5 school to offer Robinson. As a freshman, Robinson averaged 11.7 points, 4 rebounds and 3 assists per game for the 2015–16 season. As a sophomore, he averaged 18.7 points, 4 rebounds, and 3.4 assists per game. During his junior year, he averaged 20.7 points, 3.6 rebounds and 3.3 assists per game and was named All ACC First Team with 14 ACC Player of the Year votes. Additionally, he was an Associated Press honorable mention All-American. He scored a career-high 46 points in a loss at Notre Dame on February 6. After the season, he declared for the 2018 NBA draft but did not hire an agent to preserve his collegiate eligibility. On April 28, 2018, he hired an agent with CAA sports thus ending his eligibility. Robinson became the first ever lottery draft pick out of Boston College.

== Professional career ==
=== Los Angeles Clippers (2018–2020) ===
On June 21, 2018, Robinson was selected with the thirteenth overall pick by the Los Angeles Clippers in the 2018 NBA draft. Robinson scored a career-high 21 points in a win versus the Atlanta Hawks on November 17, 2019.

=== Washington Wizards (2020–2021) ===
On February 6, 2020, Robinson was traded to the Washington Wizards in a 3-team trade, involving the New York Knicks.

On April 8, 2021, Robinson was waived by the Wizards after 38 appearances.

=== Golden State / Santa Cruz Warriors (2022–2024) ===
On January 5, 2022, Robinson was acquired by the Santa Cruz Warriors.

On September 29, 2023, Robinson signed a two-way contract with the Golden State Warriors.

=== Saint-Quentin (2024–2025) ===
On July 3, 2024, Robinson moved to France and signed with Saint-Quentin of the LNB Élite.

=== Galatasaray (2025–present) ===
On June 29, 2025, Robinson signed with Galatasaray MCT Technic of the Turkish Basketbol Süper Ligi (BSL).

== Career statistics ==
Legend
GP	Games played	GS	Games started	MPG	Minutes per game
FG%	Field goal percentage	3P%	3-point field goal percentage	FT%	Free throw percentage
RPG	Rebounds per game	APG	Assists per game	SPG	Steals per game
BPG	Blocks per game	PPG	Points per game	**Bold**	Career high

=== NBA ===
==== Regular season ====
Year	Team	GP	GS	MPG	FG%	3P%	FT%	RPG	APG	SPG	BPG	PPG
2018–19	L.A. Clippers	33	0	9.7	**.400**	.316	.667	1.2	.6	.3	.1	3.4
2019–20	L.A. Clippers	**42**	1	11.3	.338	.284	.579	1.4	1.1	.3	.2	2.9
2019–20	Washington	21	5	**24.0**	.397	**.349**	.763	**3.3**	**2.0**	**.7**	**.4**	**9.4**
2020–21	Washington	17	**6**	17.9	.295	.262	**.800**	2.2	1.5	**.7**	**.4**	4.9
2023–24	Golden State	22	0	3.7	.333	.118	.636	.3	.2	.0	.1	1.4
Career		135	12	12.5	.361	.297	.711	1.6	1.0	.4	.2	4.0

==== Playoffs ====
Year	Team	GP	GS	MPG	FG%	3P%	FT%	RPG	APG	SPG	BPG	PPG
2019	L.A. Clippers	5	0	9.2	.357	.500	1.000	1.2	1.4	.4	.0	3.6
Career		5	0	9.2	.357	.500	1.000	1.2	1.4	.4	.0	3.6

=== College ===
Year	Team	GP	GS	MPG	FG%	3P%	FT%	RPG	APG	SPG	BPG	PPG
2015–16	Boston College	23	23	33.4	.429	.381	.643	**4.0**	3.0	1.4	.3	11.7
2016–17	Boston College	32	32	34.0	.423	.333	.722	3.9	**3.4**	**1.7**	**.4**	18.7
2017–18	Boston College	**35**	**35**	**36.0**	**.485**	**.409**	**.830**	3.6	3.3	.9	.1	**20.7**
Career		90	90	34.6	.450	.376	.755	3.8	3.3	1.3	.3	17.7

== Personal life ==
Robinson is son of basketball player Jerome Robinson Sr..
