= Jemerrio Jones =

American basketball player (born 1995)

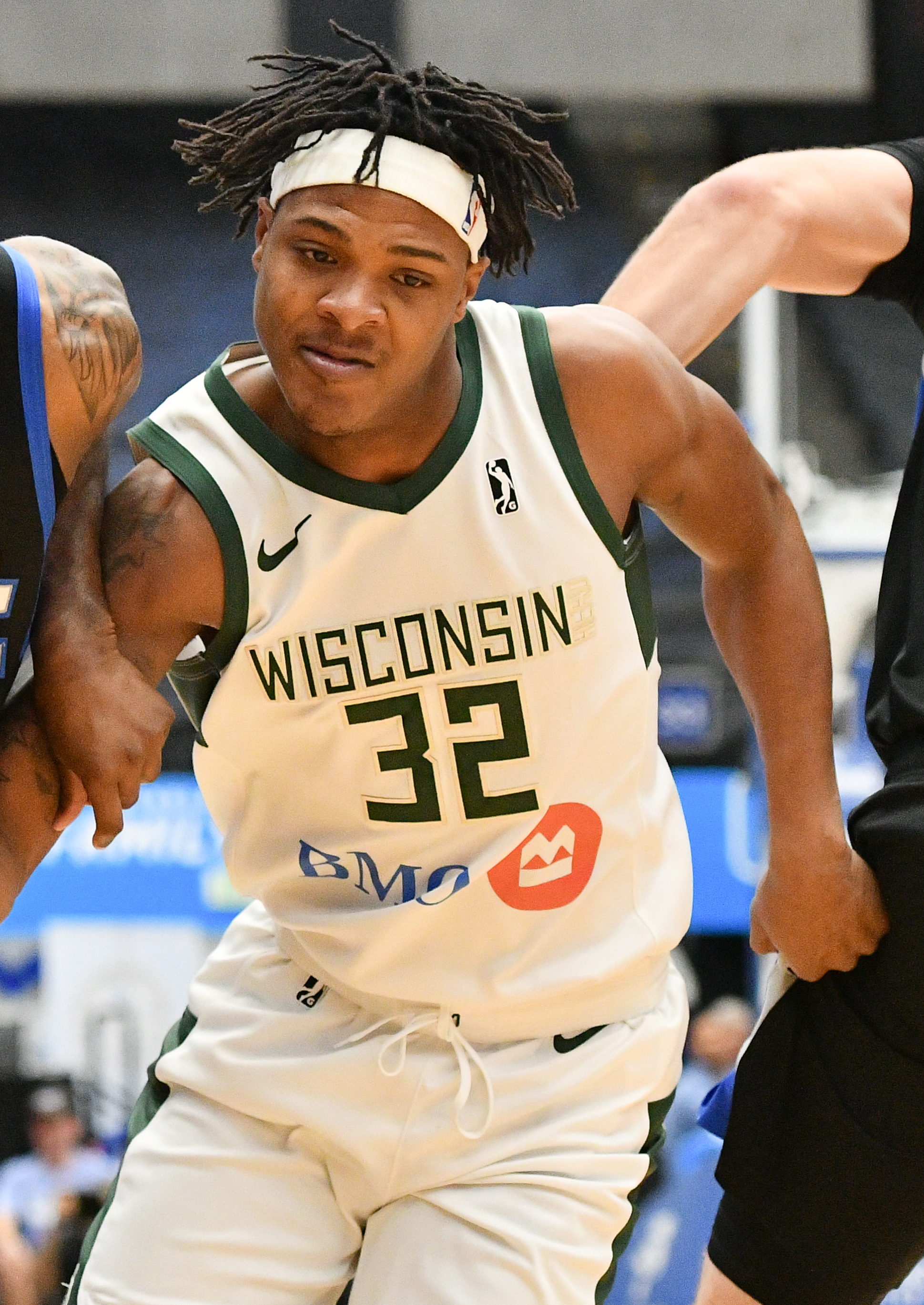

Personal information
- Born: April 9, 1995 (age 31) Nashville, Tennessee, U.S.
- Listed height: 6 ft 5 in (1.96 m)
- Listed weight: 175 lb (79 kg)

Career information
- High school: Melrose (Memphis, Tennessee)
- College: Hill College (2014–2016); New Mexico State (2016–2018)
- NBA draft: 2018: undrafted
- Playing career: 2018–present
- Position: Small forward

Career history
- 2018–2019: South Bay Lakers
- 2019: Los Angeles Lakers
- 2019–2020: Wisconsin Herd
- 2021: Delaware Blue Coats
- 2021: Wisconsin Herd
- 2021: Los Angeles Lakers
- 2021–2022: Wisconsin Herd
- 2022: South Bay Lakers
- 2022–2023: Lakeland Magic
- 2024–2025: Osceola Magic
- 2025: Ángeles de la Ciudad de México
- 2025: Rahoveci 029
- 2026: Frayles de Guasave

Career highlights
- All-NBA G League Third Team (2020); WAC Player of the Year (2018); First-team All-WAC (2018)
- Stats at NBA.com
- Stats at Basketball Reference

Jemerrio Jones (born April 9, 1995) is an American professional basketball player for the Santos del Potosí of the Liga Nacional de Baloncesto Profesional. He played college basketball for the New Mexico State Aggies.

== College career ==
Jones began focusing on rebounding at a young age growing up in Memphis, Tennessee. He tore his ACL as a junior in high school and this limited his college options. Jones ended up at Hill College and averaged 11.7 points per game over two seasons. He broke the NJCAA tournament rebounding record with 72 rebounds in five games. He committed to play at New Mexico State.

He was named the 2017–18 WAC Player of the Year.

As a senior, Jones became the first player since 1997 to record 20+ rebounds in three straight games. He averaged 11.0 points, 13.2 rebounds and 3.1 assists per game in his senior year. He was named WAC Tournament Most Valuable Player since he averaged 12.3 points and 18.3 rebounds per game over three tournament games. Jones set a WAC single-season record with 450 rebounds and was named WAC Player of the Year. He was also named to the National Association of Basketball Coaches (NABC) All-District 6 first team and to the US Basketball Writers Association (USBWA) All-District VIII Team.

== Professional career ==
=== South Bay Lakers (2018–2019) ===
After going undrafted in the 2018 NBA draft, Jones was selected with the 18th pick of the 2018 NBA G League draft by the Santa Cruz Warriors. Shortly thereafter, he was traded alongside a 2019 first-round pick to the South Bay Lakers for the rights to Serbian player Alen Smailagić. He was added to the training camp roster.

=== Los Angeles Lakers (2019) ===
On March 31, 2019, Jones signed with the Los Angeles Lakers. In his NBA debut, Jones had two points, one rebound and one steal against the New Orleans Pelicans. On April 7, Jones started for the Lakers, grabbing a career-high 16 rebounds in a 113–109 win over the Utah Jazz.

=== Wisconsin Herd (2019–2020) ===
On July 5, 2019, Jones was traded to the Washington Wizards in a three-team trade. On October 16, 2019, Jones was waived by the Wizards after the team's four preseason games.

Jones joined the Wisconsin Herd of the NBA G League after being acquired in a trade. He was suspended a game against the Erie BayHawks on March 9, 2020, for compiling his 13th technical foul. In the 2019–20 season, Jones averaged 10.8 points, 12.0 rebounds, 4.6 assists and 1.3 steals per game.

=== Delaware Blue Coats (2021) ===
Jones joined the Delaware Blue Coats for their 2021 restart, making his debut in their season opener on February 11, 2021.

=== Return to Wisconsin (2021) ===
In October 2021, Jones rejoined the Wisconsin Herd. In 11 games, he averaged 6.5 points, 8.3 rebounds, 3.9 assists and 1.5 steals in 25.7 minutes per game.

=== Return to Los Angeles (2021) ===
On December 21, 2021, Jones returned to the Los Angeles Lakers after signing a 10-day contract.

=== Third stint with Wisconsin (2021–2022) ===
On December 31, 2021, Jones was reacquired by the Wisconsin Herd.

=== Return to South Bay (2022) ===
On February 2, 2022, Jones was traded to the South Bay Lakers in exchange for the returning player rights to Wayne Selden, a 2022 first-round draft pick, and a 2022 third-round draft pick.

=== Lakeland / Osceola Magic (2022–2025) ===
On November 3, 2022, Jones was named to the opening night roster for the Lakeland Magic.

On October 27, 2024, Jones joined the Osceola Magic. However, he was waived on January 15, 2025.

== Career statistics ==
Legend
GP	Games played	GS	Games started	MPG	Minutes per game
FG%	Field goal percentage	3P%	3-point field goal percentage	FT%	Free throw percentage
RPG	Rebounds per game	APG	Assists per game	SPG	Steals per game
BPG	Blocks per game	PPG	Points per game	**Bold**	Career high

=== NBA ===
==== Regular season ====
Year	Team	GP	GS	MPG	FG%	3P%	FT%	RPG	APG	SPG	BPG	PPG
2018–19	L.A. Lakers	**6**	**2**	**23.8**	.364	**.200**	**.500**	**8.2**	**2.2**	**1.2**	**.8**	**4.5**
2021–22	L.A. Lakers	2	0	7.5	**.667**	–	–	1.5	.0	.5	.0	2.0
Career		8	2	19.8	.389	.200	.500	6.5	1.6	1.0	.6	3.9

=== College ===
Year	Team	GP	GS	MPG	FG%	3P%	FT%	RPG	APG	SPG	BPG	PPG
2016–17	New Mexico State	34	0	24.5	.502	**.227**	**.610**	8.4	3.0	**1.1**	**.7**	9.7
2017–18	New Mexico State	**34**	**33**	**28.4**	**.503**	.093	.521	**13.2**	**3.1**	**1.1**	.6	**11.0**
Career		68	33	26.4	.503	.138	.573	10.8	3.1	1.1	.6	10.4
