= 2018–19 Los Angeles Lakers season =

NBA professional basketball team season

- Head coach: Luke Walton
- President: Jeanie Buss
- General manager: Rob Pelinka
- Owners: Jerry Buss family trust (primary owner being Jeanie Buss as of March 27, 2017)
- Arena: Staples Center

Results
- Record: 37–45 (.451)
- Place: Division: 4th (Pacific); Conference: 10th (Western)
- Playoff finish: Did not qualify
- Stats at Basketball Reference

Local media
- Television: Spectrum SportsNet
- Radio: ESPN LA 710 (English) • 1020 Radio AM (Spanish)

The 2018–19 Los Angeles Lakers season was the franchise's 71st season, its 70th season in the National Basketball Association (NBA), and its 59th in Los Angeles. On August 2, 2018, the Lakers introduced new uniforms, retiring the look involving the curved wishbone collar that has been in place since 1999–2000.

Following the signing of LeBron James on July 1, 2018, the Lakers hoped to finish with a winning record and playoff appearance for the first time since the 2012–13 season. However, after an improved 20–14 start to the season, several injuries accumulated throughout the season including James, Rajon Rondo, Lonzo Ball, and Brandon Ingram, and the Lakers fell below .500 by the All-Star break. By March, the Lakers were eliminated from playoff contention, extending the team's postseason drought to a franchise record six seasons, and a sixth straight losing season, even after improving from their 2017–18 campaign by two games. It is the first time that James missed the playoffs since 2005 and first time he did not appear in the NBA Finals since 2010. This was the last time until 2022 that the Lakers missed the playoffs.

On April 9, the conclusion of the Lakers' season, Magic Johnson stepped down as president of basketball operations. Three days later, Luke Walton and the team agreed to part ways.

== Draft ==
Round	Pick	Player	Position	Nationality	School / Club team
1	25	Moritz Wagner	PF	Germany	Michigan
2	39	Isaac Bonga	SF	Germany	(Germany) Frankfurt Skyliners
2	47	Sviatoslav Mykhailiuk	SG	Ukraine	Kansas

== Roster ==
2018–19 Los Angeles Lakers roster
Players

Pos.	No.	Player	Height	Weight	DOB	From
PG	2	Lonzo Ball	6 ft 6 in (1.98 m)	190 lb (86 kg)	1997-10-27	UCLA
PG	17	Isaac Bonga	6 ft 8 in (2.03 m)	180 lb (82 kg)	1999-11-08	Germany
SG	35	Reggie Bullock	6 ft 6 in (1.98 m)	205 lb (93 kg)	1991-03-16	North Carolina
SG	1	Kentavious Caldwell-Pope	6 ft 5 in (1.96 m)	205 lb (93 kg)	1993-02-18	Georgia
SG	4	Alex Caruso	6 ft 4 in (1.93 m)	186 lb (84 kg)	1994-02-28	Texas A&M
C	5	Tyson Chandler	7 ft 1 in (2.16 m)	240 lb (109 kg)	1982-10-02	Dominguez HS (CA)
SG	3	Josh Hart	6 ft 5 in (1.96 m)	215 lb (98 kg)	1995-03-06	Villanova
SF	14	Brandon Ingram	6 ft 8 in (2.03 m)	190 lb (86 kg)	1997-09-02	Duke
SF	23	LeBron James	6 ft 8 in (2.03 m)	250 lb (113 kg)	1984-12-30	St. Vincent–St. Mary HS (OH)
SF	10	Jemerrio Jones	6 ft 5 in (1.96 m)	174 lb (79 kg)	1995-04-09	New Mexico State
PF	0	Kyle Kuzma	6 ft 9 in (2.06 m)	220 lb (100 kg)	1995-07-24	Utah
C	7	JaVale McGee	7 ft 0 in (2.13 m)	270 lb (122 kg)	1988-01-19	Nevada
PF	31	Mike Muscala	6 ft 10 in (2.08 m)	240 lb (109 kg)	1991-07-01	Bucknell
PG	9	Rajon Rondo	6 ft 1 in (1.85 m)	186 lb (84 kg)	1986-02-22	Kentucky
SG	6	Lance Stephenson	6 ft 6 in (1.98 m)	230 lb (104 kg)	1990-09-05	Cincinnati
C	15	Moritz Wagner	6 ft 11 in (2.11 m)	245 lb (111 kg)	1997-04-26	Michigan
C	19	Johnathan Williams (TW)	6 ft 9 in (2.06 m)	228 lb (103 kg)	1995-05-22	Gonzaga

Coaches
Head coach
- Luke Walton
Assistant(s)
- Mark Madsen
- Jesse Mermuys
- Miles Simon
- Brian Shaw (Associate HC)
- Brian Keefe (assistant coach/player development)
- Clay Moser (assistant coach/basketball strategy)
- Casey Owens (assistant coach/advance professional scout)

Legend
- (DP) Unsigned draft pick
- (FA) Free agent
- (S) Suspended
- (GL) On assignment to G League affiliate
- (TW) Two-way affiliate player
- Injured

Roster
Updated: March 31, 2019

=== Roster notes ===
- Point guard Lonzo Ball played 47 games (his last game being on January 19, 2019) but missed the rest of the season due to a Grade 3 left ankle sprain.
- Shooting guard Josh Hart played 67 games (his last game being on March 19, 2019) but missed the remainder of the season after having an ultrasonic debridement procedure on the patella tendon in his right knee.
- Small forward Brandon Ingram played 52 games (his last game being on March 2, 2019) but missed the rest of the season after being diagnosed with a deep venous thrombosis in his right arm. He underwent successful thoracic outlet decompression surgery on his right arm on March 16, 2019.

== Standings ==
=== Division ===
Pacific Division	W	L	PCT	GB	Home	Road	Div	GP
c – Golden State Warriors	57	25	.695	–	30‍–‍11	27‍–‍14	13–3	82
x – Los Angeles Clippers	48	34	.585	9.0	26‍–‍15	22‍–‍19	11–5	82
Sacramento Kings	39	43	.476	18.0	24‍–‍17	15‍–‍26	4–12	82
Los Angeles Lakers	37	45	.451	20.0	22‍–‍19	15‍–‍26	9–7	82
Phoenix Suns	19	63	.232	38.0	12‍–‍29	7‍–‍34	3–13	82

=== Conference ===
Western Conference
#	Team	W	L	PCT	GB	GP
1	c – Golden State Warriors *	57	25	.695	–	82
2	y – Denver Nuggets *	54	28	.659	3.0	82
3	x – Portland Trail Blazers	53	29	.646	4.0	82
4	y – Houston Rockets *	53	29	.646	4.0	82
5	x – Utah Jazz	50	32	.610	7.0	82
6	x – Oklahoma City Thunder	49	33	.598	8.0	82
7	x – San Antonio Spurs	48	34	.585	9.0	82
8	x – Los Angeles Clippers	48	34	.585	9.0	82
9	Sacramento Kings	39	43	.476	18.0	82
10	Los Angeles Lakers	37	45	.451	20.0	82
11	Minnesota Timberwolves	36	46	.439	21.0	82
12	Memphis Grizzlies	33	49	.402	24.0	82
13	New Orleans Pelicans	33	49	.402	24.0	82
14	Dallas Mavericks	33	49	.402	24.0	82
15	Phoenix Suns	19	63	.232	38.0	82

== Game log ==
=== Preseason ===
2018 preseason game log
Total: 3–3 (Home: 2–3; Road: 1–0)
Preseason: 3–3 (home: 2–3; road: 1–0)

Game	Date	Team	Score	High points	High rebounds	High assists	Location Attendance	Record
1	September 30	Denver	L 107–124	JaVale McGee (17)	McGee, Rondo (7)	Rajon Rondo (11)	Valley View Casino Center; 13,565	0–1
2	October 2	Denver	L 111–113	JaVale McGee (15)	JaVale McGee (8)	Rajon Rondo (7)	Staples Center; 18,997	0–2
3	October 4	Sacramento	W 128–123	Brandon Ingram (31)	Brandon Ingram (9)	Lance Stephenson (5)	Staples Center; 18,997	1–2
4	October 6	LA Clippers	L 87–103	Kyle Kuzma (15)	JaVale McGee (9)	Rajon Rondo (10)	Honda Center; 18,040	1–3
5	October 10	Golden State	W 123–113	Brandon Ingram (26)	LeBron James (10)	Rajon Rondo (7)	T-Mobile Arena; 1,763	2–3
6	October 12	@ Golden State	W 119–105	Sviatoslav Mykhailiuk (22)	Johnathan Williams (12)	Lonzo Ball (7)	SAP Center; 18,523	3–3

2018–19 season schedule

=== Regular season ===
2018–19 game log
Total: 37–45 (Home: 22–19; Road: 15–26)
October: 3–5 (home: 2–2; road: 1–3)

Game	Date	Team	Score	High points	High rebounds	High assists	Location Attendance	Record
1	October 18	@ Portland	L 119–128	LeBron James (26)	LeBron James (12)	Rajon Rondo (11)	Moda Center; 19,996	0–1
2	October 20	Houston	L 115–124	LeBron James (24)	Rajon Rondo (7)	Rajon Rondo (10)	Staples Center; 18,997	0–2
3	October 22	San Antonio	L 142–143 (OT)	Kyle Kuzma (37)	Josh Hart (10)	LeBron James (14)	Staples Center; 18,997	0–3
4	October 24	@ Phoenix	W 131–113	Lance Stephenson (23)	Lance Stephenson (8)	LeBron James (10)	Talking Stick Resort Arena; 18,055	1–3
5	October 25	Denver	W 121–114	LeBron James (28)	LeBron James (11)	LeBron James (11)	Staples Center; 18,997	2–3
6	October 27	@ San Antonio	L 106–110	LeBron James (35)	LeBron James (11)	Rajon Rondo (5)	AT&T Center; 18,589	2–4
7	October 29	@ Minnesota	L 120–124	LeBron James (29)	LeBron James (10)	Rajon Rondo (8)	Target Center; 18,978	2–5
8	October 31	Dallas	W 114–113	LeBron James (29)	JaVale McGee (15)	Lonzo Ball (7)	Staples Center; 18,997	3–5

November: 10–4 (home: 6–2; road: 4–2)

Game	Date	Team	Score	High points	High rebounds	High assists	Location Attendance	Record
9	November 3	@ Portland	W 114–110	LeBron James (28)	Rajon Rondo (10)	LeBron James (7)	Moda Center; 19,848	4–5
10	November 4	Toronto	L 107–121	Kyle Kuzma (24)	Lonzo Ball (9)	LeBron James (6)	Staples Center; 18,997	4–6
11	November 7	Minnesota	W 114–110	LeBron James (24)	LeBron James (10)	Rajon Rondo (10)	Staples Center; 18,997	5–6
12	November 10	@ Sacramento	W 101–86	LeBron James (25)	Tyson Chandler (12)	Rajon Rondo (7)	Golden 1 Center; 17,583	6–6
13	November 11	Atlanta	W 107–106	LeBron James (26)	JaVale McGee (9)	Lonzo Ball (11)	Staples Center; 18,997	7–6
14	November 14	Portland	W 126–117	LeBron James (44)	LeBron James (10)	LeBron James (9)	Staples Center; 18,997	8–6
15	November 17	@ Orlando	L 117–130	LeBron James (22)	Kuzma, Stephenson, Ingram (6)	Ingram, James (7)	Amway Center; 19,249	8–7
16	November 18	@ Miami	W 113–97	LeBron James (51)	Tyson Chandler (11)	Lonzo Ball (7)	American Airlines Arena; 19,686	9–7
17	November 21	@ Cleveland	W 109–105	LeBron James (32)	LeBron James (14)	LeBron James (7)	Quicken Loans Arena; 19,432	10–7
18	November 23	Utah	W 90–83	Brandon Ingram (24)	Ball, James (10)	LeBron James (7)	Staples Center; 18,997	11–7
19	November 25	Orlando	L 104–108	LeBron James (24)	Lonzo Ball (10)	LeBron James (7)	Staples Center; 18,997	11–8
20	November 27	@ Denver	L 85–117	Kyle Kuzma (21)	LeBron James (7)	Kuzma, Stephenson, Hart (3)	Pepsi Center; 19,583	11–9
21	November 29	Indiana	W 104–96	LeBron James (38)	Chandler, James, Kuzma (9)	LeBron James (7)	Staples Center; 18,997	12–9
22	November 30	Dallas	W 114–103	LeBron James (28)	Kyle Kuzma (12)	Kyle Kuzma (6)	Staples Center; 18,997	13–9

December: 8–7 (home: 5–2; road: 3–5)

Game	Date	Team	Score	High points	High rebounds	High assists	Location Attendance	Record
23	December 2	Phoenix	W 120–96	Kyle Kuzma (23)	Tyson Chandler (11)	LeBron James (8)	Staples Center; 18,997	14–9
24	December 5	San Antonio	W 121–113	LeBron James (42)	Chandler, Kuzma (9)	Lonzo Ball (9)	Staples Center; 18,997	15–9
25	December 7	@ San Antonio	L 120–133	LeBron James (35)	JaVale McGee (12)	Ball, James (11)	AT&T Center; 18,354	15–10
26	December 8	@ Memphis	W 111–88	Kuzma, James (20)	Tyson Chandler (14)	LeBron James (9)	FedExForum; 17,794	16–10
27	December 10	Miami	W 108–105	Kyle Kuzma (33)	LeBron James (9)	LeBron James (12)	Staples Center; 18,997	17–10
28	December 13	@ Houston	L 111–126	LeBron James (29)	Tyson Chandler (8)	Lonzo Ball (8)	Toyota Center; 18,055	17–11
29	December 15	@ Charlotte	W 128–100	LeBron James (24)	LeBron James (12)	LeBron James (11)	Spectrum Center; 19,641	18–11
30	December 16	@ Washington	L 110–128	Kentavious Caldwell-Pope (25)	Tyson Chandler (7)	Caldwell-Pope, Stephenson (5)	Capital One Arena; 20,409	18–12
31	December 18	@ Brooklyn	L 110–115	LeBron James (36)	LeBron James (13)	LeBron James (8)	Barclays Center; 17,735	18–13
32	December 21	New Orleans	W 112–104	Kyle Kuzma (23)	LeBron James (12)	LeBron James (14)	Staples Center; 18,997	19–13
33	December 23	Memphis	L 99–107	LeBron James (22)	LeBron James (14)	LeBron James (7)	Staples Center; 18,997	19–14
34	December 25	@ Golden State	W 127–101	Kyle Kuzma (19)	LeBron James (13)	Rajon Rondo (10)	Oracle Arena; 19,596	20–14
35	December 27	@ Sacramento	L 116–117	Kyle Kuzma (33)	Tyson Chandler (10)	Lonzo Ball (12)	Golden 1 Center; 17,583	20–15
36	December 28	LA Clippers	L 107–118	Kyle Kuzma (24)	Tyson Chandler (15)	Lonzo Ball (6)	Staples Center; 18,997	20–16
37	December 30	Sacramento	W 121–114	Kentavious Caldwell-Pope (26)	JaVale McGee (12)	Brandon Ingram (9)	Staples Center; 18,997	21–16

January: 6–9 (home: 3–6; road: 3–3)

Game	Date	Team	Score	High points	High rebounds	High assists	Location Attendance	Record
38	January 2	Oklahoma City	L 100–107	Kentavious Caldwell-Pope (25)	Josh Hart (15)	Lonzo Ball (7)	Staples Center; 18,997	21–17
39	January 4	New York	L 112–119	Brandon Ingram (21)	Ingram, McGee (9)	Lance Stephenson (7)	Staples Center; 18,997	21–18
40	January 6	@ Minnesota	L 86–108	Lance Stephenson (14)	Tyson Chandler (10)	Lance Stephenson (6)	Target Center; 18,978	21–19
41	January 7	@ Dallas	W 107–97	Brandon Ingram (29)	Josh Hart (12)	Hart, Ingram (6)	American Airlines Center; 20,354	22–19
42	January 9	Detroit	W 113–100	Kyle Kuzma (41)	Ingram, Zubac (9)	Lonzo Ball (11)	Staples Center; 18,997	23–19
43	January 11	@ Utah	L 95–113	Michael Beasley (17)	Kuzma, McGee (9)	Lonzo Ball (6)	Vivint Smart Home Arena; 18,306	23–20
44	January 13	Cleveland	L 95–101	Kyle Kuzma (29)	Kyle Kuzma (9)	Lonzo Ball (8)	Staples Center; 18,997	23–21
45	January 15	Chicago	W 107–100	Lonzo Ball (19)	Kyle Kuzma (12)	Brandon Ingram (7)	Staples Center; 18,997	24–21
46	January 17	@ Oklahoma City	W 138–128 (OT)	Kyle Kuzma (31)	Ivica Zubac (12)	Brandon Ingram (11)	Chesapeake Energy Arena; 18,203	25–21
47	January 19	@ Houston	L 134–138 (OT)	Kyle Kuzma (32)	JaVale McGee (14)	Lonzo Ball (11)	Toyota Center; 18,055	25–22
48	January 21	Golden State	L 111–130	Ivica Zubac (18)	JaVale McGee (9)	Lance Stephenson (5)	Staples Center; 18,997	25–23
49	January 24	Minnesota	L 105–120	Brandon Ingram (20)	Ivica Zubac (8)	Rajon Rondo (13)	Staples Center; 18,997	25–24
50	January 27	Phoenix	W 116–102	Caldwell-Pope, Zubac (24)	Ivica Zubac (16)	Rajon Rondo (11)	Staples Center; 18,997	26–24
51	January 29	Philadelphia	L 105–121	Brandon Ingram (36)	JaVale McGee (14)	Rajon Rondo (11)	Staples Center; 18,997	26–25
52	January 31	@ LA Clippers	W 123–120 (OT)	LeBron James (24)	LeBron James (14)	LeBron James (9)	Staples Center; 19,068	27–25

February: 3–6 (home: 2–0; road: 1–6)

Game	Date	Team	Score	High points	High rebounds	High assists	Location Attendance	Record
53	February 2	@ Golden State	L 101–115	Brandon Ingram (20)	Ivica Zubac (9)	Rajon Rondo (11)	Oracle Arena; 19,596	27–26
54	February 5	@ Indiana	L 94–136	LeBron James (18)	LeBron James (7)	LeBron James (9)	Bankers Life Fieldhouse; 17,265	27–27
55	February 7	@ Boston	W 129–128	LeBron James (28)	LeBron James (12)	LeBron James (12)	TD Garden; 18,624	28–27
56	February 10	@ Philadelphia	L 120–143	Kyle Kuzma (39)	JaVale McGee (13)	LeBron James (9)	Wells Fargo Center; 18,624	28–28
57	February 12	@ Atlanta	L 113–117	LeBron James (28)	LeBron James (11)	LeBron James (16)	State Farm Arena; 16,824	28–29
58	February 21	Houston	W 111–106	LeBron James (29)	Brandon Ingram (13)	Rajon Rondo (7)	Staples Center; 18,997	29–29
59	February 23	@ New Orleans	L 115–128	Brandon Ingram (29)	Kyle Kuzma (8)	LeBron James (12)	Smoothie King Center; 18,626	29–30
60	February 25	@ Memphis	L 105–110	Brandon Ingram (32)	LeBron James (12)	LeBron James (11)	FedExForum; 17,794	29–31
61	February 27	New Orleans	W 125–119	LeBron James (33)	Rajon Rondo (7)	Rajon Rondo (16)	Staples Center; 18,997	30–31

March: 5–11 (home: 3–5; road: 2–6)

Game	Date	Team	Score	High points	High rebounds	High assists	Location Attendance	Record
62	March 1	Milwaukee	L 120–131	James, Ingram (31)	Rondo, Ingram (8)	LeBron James (10)	Staples Center; 18,997	30–32
63	March 2	@ Phoenix	L 109–118	LeBron James (27)	LeBron James (9)	LeBron James (16)	Talking Stick Resort Arena; 18,055	30–33
64	March 4	LA Clippers	L 105–113	LeBron James (27)	Rajon Rondo (10)	Rajon Rondo (12)	Staples Center; 18,997	30–34
65	March 6	Denver	L 99–115	LeBron James (31)	James, Rondo (7)	Rajon Rondo (11)	Staples Center; 18,997	30–35
66	March 9	Boston	L 107–120	LeBron James (30)	LeBron James (10)	LeBron James (12)	Staples Center; 18,997	30–36
67	March 12	@ Chicago	W 123–107	LeBron James (36)	JaVale McGee (11)	Rajon Rondo (10)	United Center; 21,359	31–36
68	March 14	@ Toronto	L 98–111	LeBron James (29)	JaVale McGee (9)	Rajon Rondo (8)	Scotiabank Arena; 19,962	31–37
69	March 15	@ Detroit	L 97–111	JaVale McGee (20)	JaVale McGee (13)	Kyle Kuzma (10)	Little Caesars Arena; 20,768	31–38
70	March 17	@ New York	L 123–124	LeBron James (33)	McGee, Williams (7)	James, Kuzma (8)	Madison Square Garden; 19,812	31–39
71	March 19	@ Milwaukee	L 101–115	Kentavious Caldwell-Pope (35)	JaVale McGee (11)	Rajon Rondo (10)	Fiserv Forum; 17,879	31–40
72	March 22	Brooklyn	L 106–111	JaVale McGee (33)	JaVale McGee (20)	LeBron James (14)	Staples Center; 18,997	31–41
73	March 24	Sacramento	W 111–106	James, Kuzma (29)	JaVale McGee (14)	LeBron James (11)	Staples Center; 18,997	32–41
74	March 26	Washington	W 124–106	Kentavious Caldwell-Pope (29)	JaVale McGee (15)	LeBron James (14)	Staples Center; 18,997	33–41
75	March 27	@ Utah	L 100–115	Kyle Kuzma (21)	JaVale McGee (13)	Rajon Rondo (6)	Vivint Smart Home Arena; 18,306	33–42
76	March 29	Charlotte	W 129–115	LeBron James (23)	JaVale McGee (9)	Rajon Rondo (17)	Staples Center; 18,997	34–42
77	March 31	@ New Orleans	W 130–102	Rajon Rondo (24)	JaVale McGee (12)	Rajon Rondo (16)	Smoothie King Center; 18,562	35–42

April: 2–3 (home: 1–2; road: 1–1)

Game	Date	Team	Score	High points	High rebounds	High assists	Location Attendance	Record
78	April 2	@ Oklahoma City	L 103–119	Kentavious Caldwell-Pope (23)	Rajon Rondo (10)	Rajon Rondo (9)	Chesapeake Energy Arena; 18,203	35–43
79	April 4	Golden State	L 90–108	Johnathan Williams (17)	McGee, J. Williams (13)	Alex Caruso (6)	Staples Center; 18,997	35–44
80	April 5	@ LA Clippers	W 122–117	Alex Caruso (32)	Caruso, J. Jones, McGee (10)	Rajon Rondo (12)	Staples Center; 17,910	36–44
81	April 7	Utah	W 113–109	Kentavious Caldwell-Pope (32)	Jemerrio Jones (16)	Alex Caruso (11)	Staples Center; 18,997	37–44
82	April 9	Portland	L 101–104	Kentavious Caldwell-Pope (32)	Jemerrio Jones (15)	Alex Caruso (13)	Staples Center; 18,997	37–45

2018–19 season schedule

== Player statistics ==
Player	Pos.	GP	GS	MP	Reb.	Ast.	Stl.	Blk.	Pts.
Lonzo Ball	PG	47	45	1,423	251	255	69	19	465
Michael Beasley^{†}	PF	26	2	277	60	25	9	10	181
Isaac Bonga	PG	22	0	120	25	15	9	4	19
Reggie Bullock^{≠}	SG	19	16	524	50	20	16	7	177
Kentavious Caldwell-Pope	SG	82	23	2,035	238	110	73	13	938
Alex Caruso	PG	25	4	531	67	77	24	9	229
Tyson Chandler^{≠}	C	48	6	786	268	31	19	22	147
Josh Hart	SG	67	22	1,715	248	93	64	40	525
Andre Ingram^{≠}	SG	4	0	15	2	0	1	0	0
Brandon Ingram	SF	52	52	1,760	267	154	28	31	950
LeBron James	SF	55	55	1,937	465	454	72	33	1,505
Jemerrio Jones^{≠}	SF	6	2	143	49	13	7	5	27
Kyle Kuzma	PF	70	68	2,314	382	178	41	26	1,308
Scott Machado^{≠}	PG	4	0	19	0	3	1	0	10
JaVale McGee	C	75	62	1,671	566	52	47	148	897
Mike Muscala^{≠}	PF	17	4	265	44	14	4	11	100
Sviatoslav Mykhailiuk^{†}	SF	39	0	420	34	33	13	1	127
Rajon Rondo	PG	46	29	1,369	243	367	57	7	424
Lance Stephenson	SG	68	3	1,123	215	140	41	7	491
Moritz Wagner	C	43	5	446	85	24	11	13	207
Johnathan Williams	C	24	0	372	99	13	8	7	157
Ivica Zubac^{†}	C	33	12	516	162	25	4	27	281

After all games.
^{‡}Waived during the season
^{†}Traded during the season
^{≠}Acquired during the season

== Transactions ==
=== Signing of LeBron James ===
On July 9, 2018, superstar LeBron James signed a four-year, $154 million contract with the Lakers after playing a second stint with his hometown Cleveland Cavaliers. He led the team to their first championship title in 2016, averaging 29.7 points per game in the final series, and led them to the NBA Finals 4 other times (2007, 2015, 2017, and 2018). This marked his second time leaving the Cavs, after controversially doing so in 2010 to join the Miami Heat, where he led the team to 4 consecutive NBA Finals appearances, winning back-to-back in 2012 and 2013. The signing also briefly intensified the Celtics–Lakers rivalry, as his former Cavs teammate Kyrie Irving was traded to the Boston Celtics the year before, and former Celtics star Rajon Rondo joined LeBron in Los Angeles. Irving played 2 seasons for the Celtics before signing with the Brooklyn Nets during the 2019 offseason.

=== Trades ===
July 6, 2018	To Los Angeles Lakers Draft rights to Isaac Bonga	To Philadelphia 76ers 2019 second round pick Cash considerations
February 6, 2019	To Los Angeles Lakers Reggie Bullock	To Detroit Pistons Sviatoslav Mykhailiuk; 2021 second round pick
February 7, 2019	To Los Angeles Lakers Mike Muscala	To Los Angeles Clippers Michael Beasley; Ivica Zubac

=== Free agency ===
==== Re-signed ====
Player	Signed
Kentavious Caldwell-Pope	1-year contract worth $12 million
Alex Caruso	Two-way contract

==== Additions ====
Player	Signed	Former team
Rajon Rondo	1-year contract worth $9 million	New Orleans Pelicans
LeBron James	4-year contract worth $156 million	Cleveland Cavaliers
Lance Stephenson	1-year contract worth $4.5 million	Indiana Pacers
JaVale McGee	1-year contract worth $2.4 million	Golden State Warriors
Michael Beasley	1-year contract worth $3.5 million	New York Knicks
Johnathan Williams	Two-way contract	Gonzaga Bulldogs
Tyson Chandler	1-year contract worth $2.1 million	Phoenix Suns

==== Subtractions ====
Player	Reason left	New team
Tyler Ennis	Waived	(Turkey) Fenerbahçe
Thomas Bryant	Waived	Washington Wizards
Julius Randle	2-year contract worth $18 million	New Orleans Pelicans
Isaiah Thomas	1-year contract worth $2 million	Denver Nuggets
Brook Lopez	1-year contract worth $3.3 million	Milwaukee Bucks
Channing Frye	1-year contract worth $2.4 million	Cleveland Cavaliers
Luol Deng	Waived	Minnesota Timberwolves
