= 2018–19 Sacramento Kings season =

NBA professional basketball team season

- Head coach: Dave Joerger
- General manager: Vlade Divac
- Owner: Vivek Ranadivé
- Arena: Golden 1 Center

Results
- Record: 39–43 (.476)
- Place: Division: 3rd (Pacific); Conference: 9th (Western)
- Playoff finish: Did not qualify
- Stats at Basketball Reference

Local media
- Television: NBC Sports California; CBS 13
- Radio: KHTK Sports 1140

The 2018–19 Sacramento Kings season was the 74th season of the franchise, its 70th season in the National Basketball Association (NBA), and its 34th in Sacramento.

The Kings entered the season with the longest NBA postseason drought appearances at 12 seasons, last qualifying in 2006. On May 15, 2018, the Kings were given the 2018 NBA draft second pick via the lottery, their highest first-round pick since the 1989 NBA draft, and selected Duke University's Marvin Bagley III. The Kings improved from the previous season and held a winning record through the All-Star break, reaching the 30 win mark at the break for the first time since 2005. Despite the improved record, they again missed the playoffs for a record 13th straight season on March 30 as they lost against the Houston Rockets. This was the most wins the Kings have had since the 2005–06 NBA season where the Kings had a 44–38 record as the 8th seed in the Western Conference and lost to the San Antonio Spurs in a six games series.

== Draft picks ==
Round	Pick	Player	Position	Nationality	College / Club
1	2	Marvin Bagley III	PF	United States	Duke

The Kings entered draft night with two selections, the first of which had them rise up from tying the Chicago Bulls with the sixth-worst record of the draft the previous season turned into having the #2 pick of the draft and the second pick resulting in them having the higher of second-round picks after losing the first-round tiebreaker to the Bulls. With the second pick of the 2018 NBA Draft, Sacramento selected early freshman power forward Marvin Bagley III from Duke University. Marvin was one of the few top competitors entering the draft this year, and even though he was first projected to be a senior at Sierra Canyon High School earlier in the previous season, he jumped up into the collegiate rankings early to play a single season at Duke. In 33 games played for Duke (starting in all but one of those games), Bagley recorded spectacular averages of 21 points (at .614 overall percentage, including a .397 three-point percentage), 11.1 rebounds, 1.5 assists, .9 blocks, and .8 steals under 33.8 minutes per game. As a result, he was named a consensus All-American First Team member, the Pete Newell Big Man Award winner as the best low-post player that year, the ACC Rookie of the Year, the ACC Player of the Year, and a member of the All-ACC First Team. As for their second-round selection at #37 (which became Gary Trent Jr. from Duke University), it was traded to the Portland Trail Blazers for two future second-round picks and cash considerations.

== Roster ==
2018–19 Sacramento Kings roster
Players

Pos.	No.	Player	Height	Weight	DOB	From
F	35	Marvin Bagley	6 ft 11 in (2.11 m)	234 lb (106 kg)	1999–03–14	Duke
F	40	Harrison Barnes	6 ft 8 in (2.03 m)	225 lb (102 kg)	1992–05–30	North Carolina
F	88	Nemanja Bjelica	6 ft 10 in (2.08 m)	234 lb (106 kg)	1988–05–09	Serbia
G	8	Bogdan Bogdanović	6 ft 6 in (1.98 m)	205 lb (93 kg)	1992–08–18	Serbia
F	33	Corey Brewer	6 ft 9 in (2.06 m)	186 lb (84 kg)	1986–03–05	Florida
G	13	Alec Burks	6 ft 6 in (1.98 m)	214 lb (97 kg)	1991–07–20	Colorado
C	00	Willie Cauley-Stein	7 ft 0 in (2.13 m)	240 lb (109 kg)	1993–08–18	Kentucky
G	22	Cody Demps	6 ft 4 in (1.93 m)	193 lb (88 kg)	1993–12–02	Sacramento State
G	3	Yogi Ferrell	6 ft 0 in (1.83 m)	180 lb (82 kg)	1993–05–09	Indiana
G	5	De'Aaron Fox	6 ft 3 in (1.91 m)	175 lb (79 kg)	1997–12–20	Kentucky
F	32	Wenyen Gabriel (TW)	6 ft 9 in (2.06 m)	205 lb (93 kg)	1997–03–26	Kentucky
F/C	20	Harry Giles	6 ft 10 in (2.08 m)	240 lb (109 kg)	1998–04–22	Duke
G	24	Buddy Hield	6 ft 4 in (1.93 m)	214 lb (97 kg)	1992–12–17	Oklahoma
G	9	B. J. Johnson	6 ft 7 in (2.01 m)	200 lb (91 kg)	1995–12–21	La Salle
C	41	Kosta Koufos	7 ft 0 in (2.13 m)	245 lb (111 kg)	1989–02–24	Ohio State
G	10	Frank Mason	5 ft 11 in (1.80 m)	190 lb (86 kg)	1994–04–03	Kansas
F/C	50	Caleb Swanigan	6 ft 9 in (2.06 m)	250 lb (113 kg)	1997–04–18	Purdue
F	19	Troy Williams (TW)	6 ft 7 in (2.01 m)	218 lb (99 kg)	1994–12–30	Indiana

Coaches
Head coach
- Dave Joerger
Assistant(s)
- Dan Hartfield
- Bryan Gates
- Jason March
- Bob Thornton
- Duane Ticknor
- Elston Turner
- Larry Lewis (player development)
- Bobby Jackson (Player Development)
- Philip Ricci (Player Development)

Legend
- (DP) Unsigned draft pick
- (FA) Free agent
- (S) Suspended
- (GL) On assignment to G League affiliate
- (TW) Two-way affiliate player
- Injured

Roster
Updated: 2019–04–11

== Standings ==
=== Division ===
Pacific Division	W	L	PCT	GB	Home	Road	Div	GP
c – Golden State Warriors	57	25	.695	–	30‍–‍11	27‍–‍14	13–3	82
x – Los Angeles Clippers	48	34	.585	9.0	26‍–‍15	22‍–‍19	11–5	82
Sacramento Kings	39	43	.476	18.0	24‍–‍17	15‍–‍26	4–12	82
Los Angeles Lakers	37	45	.451	20.0	22‍–‍19	15‍–‍26	9–7	82
Phoenix Suns	19	63	.232	38.0	12‍–‍29	7‍–‍34	3–13	82

=== Conference ===
Western Conference
#	Team	W	L	PCT	GB	GP
1	c – Golden State Warriors *	57	25	.695	–	82
2	y – Denver Nuggets *	54	28	.659	3.0	82
3	x – Portland Trail Blazers	53	29	.646	4.0	82
4	y – Houston Rockets *	53	29	.646	4.0	82
5	x – Utah Jazz	50	32	.610	7.0	82
6	x – Oklahoma City Thunder	49	33	.598	8.0	82
7	x – San Antonio Spurs	48	34	.585	9.0	82
8	x – Los Angeles Clippers	48	34	.585	9.0	82
9	Sacramento Kings	39	43	.476	18.0	82
10	Los Angeles Lakers	37	45	.451	20.0	82
11	Minnesota Timberwolves	36	46	.439	21.0	82
12	Memphis Grizzlies	33	49	.402	24.0	82
13	New Orleans Pelicans	33	49	.402	24.0	82
14	Dallas Mavericks	33	49	.402	24.0	82
15	Phoenix Suns	19	63	.232	38.0	82

== Game log ==
=== Preseason ===
2018 preseason game log
Total: 2–4 (Home: 1–1; Road: 1–3)
Preseason: 2–4 (home: 1–1; road: 1–3)

Game	Date	Team	Score	High points	High rebounds	High assists	Location Attendance	Record
1	October 1	@ Phoenix	W 106–102	Yogi Ferrell (26)	Willie Cauley-Stein (12)	De'Aaron Fox (5)	Talking Stick Resort Arena; 8,184	1–0
2	October 4	@ LA Lakers	L 123–128	Buddy Hield (18)	Marvin Bagley III (10)	Frank Mason III (5)	Staples Center; 18,997	1–1
3	October 5	@ Golden State	L 94–122	Harry Giles (17)	Marvin Bagley III (9)	Frank Mason III (7)	Key Arena; 17,074	1–2
4	October 8	Maccabi Haifa	W 132–100	Buddy Hield (22)	Willie Cauley-Stein (8)	Frank Mason III (8)	Golden 1 Center; 17,500	2–2
5	October 11	Utah	L 93–132	Marvin Bagley III (17)	Marvin Bagley III (8)	Buddy Hield (7)	Golden 1 Center; N/A	2–3
6	October 12	@ Portland	L 115–118	Ferrell, Hield (19)	Nemanja Bjelica (9)	Frank Mason III (8)	Moda Center; 16,521	2–4

2018–19 season schedule

=== Regular season ===
2018–19 game log
Total: 39–43 (Home: 24–17; Road: 15–26)
October: 5–3 (home: 2–1; road: 3–2)

Game	Date	Team	Score	High points	High rebounds	High assists	Location Attendance	Record
1	October 17	Utah	L 117–123	Willie Cauley-Stein (23)	Nemanja Bjelica (8)	De'Aaron Fox (8)	Golden 1 Center; 17,583	0–1
2	October 19	@ New Orleans	L 129–149	Willie Cauley-Stein (20)	Marvin Bagley III (8)	De'Aaron Fox (6)	Smoothie King Center; 18,337	0–2
3	October 21	@ Oklahoma City	W 131–120	Iman Shumpert (26)	Bagley III, Cauley-Stein (7)	De'Aaron Fox (10)	Chesapeake Energy Arena; 18,203	1–2
4	October 23	@ Denver	L 112–126	Marvin Bagley III (20)	Marvin Bagley III (9)	Frank Mason III (7)	Pepsi Center; 13,214	1–3
5	October 24	Memphis	W 97–92	Buddy Hield (23)	Bjelica, Jackson (11)	De'Aaron Fox (6)	Golden 1 Center; 14,198	2–3
6	October 26	Washington	W 116–112	Nemanja Bjelica (26)	Nemanja Bjelica (12)	De'Aaron Fox (9)	Golden 1 Center; 14,101	3–3
7	October 29	@ Miami	W 123–113	Willie Cauley-Stein (26)	Willie Cauley-Stein (13)	De'Aaron Fox (8)	American Airlines Arena; 19,600	4–3
8	October 30	@ Orlando	W 107–99	Buddy Hield (25)	Cauley-Stein & Hield (11)	Fox & Mason III (5)	Amway Center; 15,074	5–3

November : 5–8 (home: 3–4; road: 2–4)

Game	Date	Team	Score	High points	High rebounds	High assists	Location Attendance	Record
9	November 1	@ Atlanta	W 146–115	De'Aaron Fox (31)	De'Aaron Fox (10)	De'Aaron Fox (15)	State Farm Arena; 12,095	6–3
10	November 4	@ Milwaukee	L 109–144	Justin Jackson (22)	Iman Shumpert (6)	De'Aaron Fox (6)	Fiserv Forum; 17,341	6–4
11	November 7	Toronto	L 105–114	Cauley-Stein & Hield (24)	Willie Cauley-Stein (8)	Iman Shumpert (6)	Golden 1 Center; 17,583	6–5
12	November 9	Minnesota	W 121–110	Willie Cauley-Stein (25)	Buddy Hield (10)	De'Aaron Fox (10)	Golden 1 Center; 17,583	7–5
13	November 10	L.A. Lakers	L 86–101	De'Aaron Fox (21)	Willie Cauley-Stein (12)	Fox, Bogdanović, Bjelica, Hield (2)	Golden 1 Center; 17,583	7–6
14	November 12	San Antonio	W 104–99	Bogdan Bogdanović (22)	Willie Cauley-Stein (13)	De'Aaron Fox (7)	Golden 1 Center; 15,500	8–6
15	November 16	@ Memphis	L 104–112	De'Aaron Fox (23)	Cauley-Stein & Williams (8)	De'Aaron Fox (10)	FedExForum; 13,811	8–7
16	November 17	@ Houston	L 112–132	Buddy Hield (23)	Marvin Bagley III (8)	Bogdan Bogdanović (5)	Toyota Center; 18,055	8–8
17	November 19	Oklahoma City	W 117–113	Buddy Hield (25)	Willie Cauley-Stein (14)	De'Aaron Fox (13)	Golden 1 Center; 16,250	9–8
18	November 21	@ Utah	W 119–110	Willie Cauley-Stein (23)	Nemanja Bjelica (8)	De'Aaron Fox (13)	Vivint Smart Home Arena; 18,306	10–8
19	November 24	@ Golden State	L 116–117	Buddy Hield (28)	Marvin Bagley III (17)	De'Aaron Fox (9)	Oracle Arena; 19,596	10–9
20	November 25	Utah	L 112–133	Bogdan Bogdanović (20)	Harry Giles (8)	Harry Giles (6)	Golden 1 Center; 16,048	10–10
21	November 29	L.A. Clippers	L 121–133	Bogdan Bogdanović (26)	Willie Cauley-Stein (10)	De'Aaron Fox (9)	Golden 1 Center; 17,583	10–11

December : 9–6 (home: 5–2; road: 4–4)

Game	Date	Team	Score	High points	High rebounds	High assists	Location Attendance	Record
22	December 1	Indiana	W 111–110	Bogdan Bogdanović (20)	Willie Cauley-Stein (13)	Fox, Bogdanović (6)	Golden 1 Center; 17,583	11–11
23	December 4	@ Phoenix	W 122–105	Buddy Hield (20)	Nemanja Bjelica (7)	De'Aaron Fox (7)	Talking Stick Resort Arena; 12,977	12–11
24	December 7	@ Cleveland	W 129–110	De'Aaron Fox (30)	Kosta Koufos (8)	De'Aaron Fox (12)	Quicken Loans Arena; 19,432	13–11
25	December 8	@ Indiana	L 97–107	Buddy Hield (20)	Nemanja Bjelica (12)	Fox, Bogdanović (6)	Bankers Life Fieldhouse; 16,867	13–12
26	December 10	@ Chicago	W 108–89	De'Aaron Fox (25)	Willie Cauley-Stein (16)	De'Aaron Fox (6)	United Center; 18,164	14–12
27	December 12	Minnesota	W 141–130	Nemanja Bjelica (25)	Marvin Bagley III (10)	De'Aaron Fox (8)	Golden 1 Center; 15,770	15–12
28	December 14	Golden State	L 125–130	Buddy Hield (27)	Willie Cauley-Stein (11)	De'Aaron Fox (9)	Golden 1 Center; 17,583	15–13
29	December 16	@ Dallas	W 120–113	Fox, Hield (28)	Nemanja Bjelica (10)	Fox, Bogdanović (5)	American Airlines Center; 19,935	16–13
30	December 17	@ Minnesota	L 105–132	Buddy Hield (21)	Kosta Koufos (8)	Frank Mason III (6)	Target Center; 12,417	16–14
31	December 19	Oklahoma City	L 113–132	Buddy Hield (37)	Willie Cauley-Stein (7)	De'Aaron Fox (12)	Golden 1 Center; 17,583	16–15
32	December 21	Memphis	W 102–99	Buddy Hield (28)	Willie Cauley-Stein (13)	De'Aaron Fox (8)	Golden 1 Center; 16,369	17–15
33	December 23	New Orleans	W 122–117	Buddy Hield (28)	Willie Cauley-Stein (17)	De'Aaron Fox (11)	Golden 1 Center; 16,643	18–15
34	December 26	@ L.A. Clippers	L 118–127	De'Aaron Fox (19)	Hield, Fox (6)	De'Aaron Fox (9)	Staples Center; 19,068	18–16
35	December 27	L.A. Lakers	W 117–116	Willie Cauley-Stein (19)	De'Aaron Fox (9)	De'Aaron Fox (12)	Golden 1 Center; 18,375	19–16
36	December 30	@ L.A. Lakers	L 114–121	De'Aaron Fox (26)	Willie Cauley-Stein (12)	De'Aaron Fox (7)	Staples Center; 18,997	19–17

January : 7–8 (home: 5–3; road: 2–5)

Game	Date	Team	Score	High points	High rebounds	High assists	Location Attendance	Record
37	January 1	Portland	L 108–113 (OT)	Buddy Hield (27)	Nemanja Bjelica (16)	Bogdan Bogdanović (5)	Golden 1 Center; 17,583	19–18
38	January 3	Denver	L 113–117	Buddy Hield (29)	Bjelica, Cauley-Stein (6)	De'Aaron Fox (8)	Golden 1 Center; 17,583	19–19
39	January 5	Golden State	L 123–127	Buddy Hield (32)	Willie Cauley-Stein (13)	Bogdanovic, Fox (7)	Golden 1 Center; 17,583	19–20
40	January 7	Orlando	W 111–95	De'Aaron Fox (20)	Willie Cauley-Stein (11)	Bogdan Bogdanović (7)	Golden 1 Center; 15,724	20–20
41	January 8	@ Phoenix	L 111–115	De'Aaron Fox (24)	Willie Cauley-Stein (7)	Fox, Bogdanović (5)	Talking Stick Resort Arena; 13,977	20–21
42	January 10	Detroit	W 112–102	Buddy Hield (18)	Willie Cauley-Stein (14)	De'Aaron Fox (6)	Golden 1 Center; 16,916	21–21
43	January 12	Charlotte	W 104–97	Bogdan Bogdanović (22)	Willie Cauley-Stein (12)	Bjelica, Cauley-Stein, Fox (4)	Golden 1 Center; 17,853	22–21
44	January 14	Portland	W 115–107	Buddy Hield (19)	Marvin Bagley III (11)	De'Aaron Fox (9)	Golden 1 Center; 17,583	23–21
45	January 17	@ Charlotte	L 95–114	Buddy Hield (24)	Willie Cauley-Stein (11)	De'Aaron Fox (8)	Spectrum Center; 15,431	23–22
46	January 19	@ Detroit	W 103–101	Buddy Hield (35)	Buddy Hield (9)	De'Aaron Fox (10)	Little Caesars Arena; 15,377	24–22
47	January 21	@ Brooklyn	L 94–123	Bogdan Bogdanović (22)	Buddy Hield (7)	Bogdan Bogdanović (11)	Barclays Center; 14,233	24–23
48	January 22	@ Toronto	L 105–120	Marvin Bagley III (22)	Marvin Bagley III (11)	Bogdan Bogdanović (6)	Scotiabank Arena; 19,800	24–24
49	January 25	@ Memphis	W 99–96	Buddy Hield (26)	Nemanja Bjelica (11)	Shumpert, Fox (5)	FedExForum; 14,486	25–24
50	January 27	@ L.A. Clippers	L 108–122	De'Aaron Fox (20)	Willie Cauley-Stein (12)	Buddy Hield (5)	Staples Center; 19,068	25–25
51	January 30	Atlanta	W 135–113	Harry Giles (20)	Marvin Bagley III (12)	Bogdanović, Fox (7)	Golden 1 Center; 17,583	26–25

February : 5–5 (home: 4–2; road: 1–3)

Game	Date	Team	Score	High points	High rebounds	High assists	Location Attendance	Record
52	February 2	Philadelphia	W 115–108	Buddy Hield (34)	Marvin Bagley (13)	De'Aaron Fox (8)	Golden 1 Center; 17,583	27–25
53	February 4	San Antonio	W 127–112	De'Aaron Fox (20)	Marvin Bagley (12)	Shumpert, Fox (6)	Golden 1 Center; 16,245	28–25
54	February 6	Houston	L 101–127	Buddy Hield (20)	Hield, Bagley (10)	De'Aaron Fox (6)	Golden 1 Center; 17,583	28–26
55	February 8	Miami	W 102–96	Buddy Hield (23)	Barnes, Hield, Cauley-Stein, Bagley (7)	Yogi Ferrell (5)	Golden 1 Center; 17,583	29–26
56	February 10	Phoenix	W 117–104	Marvin Bagley (32)	Bjelica, Cauley-Stein (8)	De'Aaron Fox (9)	Golden 1 Center; 17,583	30–26
57	February 13	@ Denver	L 118–120	Buddy Hield (25)	Harrison Barnes (11)	De'Aaron Fox (10)	Pepsi Center; 17,938	30–27
58	February 21	@ Golden State	L 123–125	Marvin Bagley (28)	Marvin Bagley (14)	De'Aaron Fox (8)	Oracle Arena; 19,596	30–28
59	February 23	@ Oklahoma City	W 119–116	Buddy Hield (34)	Willie Cauley-Stein (11)	De'Aaron Fox (9)	Chesapeake Energy Arena; 18,203	31–28
60	February 25	@ Minnesota	L 105–112	Marvin Bagley (25)	Marvin Bagley (11)	Bogdan Bogdanović (6)	Target Center; 13,691	31–29
61	February 27	Milwaukee	L 140–141 (OT)	Buddy Hield (32)	Harrison Barnes (14)	De'Aaron Fox (9)	Golden 1 Center; 17,583	31–30

March : 7–9 (home: 4–3; road: 3–6)

Game	Date	Team	Score	High points	High rebounds	High assists	Location Attendance	Record
62	March 1	L.A. Clippers	L 109–116	Buddy Hield (23)	Willie Cauley-Stein (12)	De'Aaron Fox (12)	Golden 1 Center; 17,583	31–31
63	March 4	N.Y. Knicks	W 115–108	Buddy Hield (28)	Harrison Barnes (10)	Buddy Hield (7)	Golden 1 Center; 17,034	32–31
64	March 6	Boston	L 109–111	Harrison Barnes (24)	Barnes, Hield (8)	De'Aaron Fox (7)	Golden 1 Center; 17,583	32–32
65	March 9	@ N.Y. Knicks	W 102–94	De'Aaron Fox (30)	Willie Cauley-Stein (12)	De'Aaron Fox (8)	Madison Square Garden; 19,812	33–32
66	March 11	@ Washington	L 115–121	De'Aaron Fox (20)	Nemanja Bjelica (12)	De'Aaron Fox (8)	Capital One Arena; 15,012	33–33
67	March 14	@ Boston	L 120–126	Buddy Hield (34)	Willie Cauley-Stein (13)	De'Aaron Fox (9)	TD Garden; 18,624	33–34
68	March 15	@ Philadelphia	L 114–123	Harrison Barnes (16)	Willie Cauley-Stein (7)	De'Aaron Fox (6)	Wells Fargo Center; 20,724	33–35
69	March 17	Chicago	W 129–102	Marvin Bagley (21)	Marvin Bagley (9)	Willie Cauley-Stein (5)	Golden 1 Center; 17,583	34–35
70	March 19	Brooklyn	L 121–123	De'Aaron Fox (27)	Nemanja Bjelica (10)	De'Aaron Fox (9)	Golden 1 Center; 17,583	34–36
71	March 21	Dallas	W 116–100	Buddy Hield (29)	Willie Cauley-Stein (18)	De'Aaron Fox (9)	Golden 1 Center; 17,583	35–36
72	March 23	Phoenix	W 112–103	Barnes, Hield (25)	Nemanja Bjelica (17)	De'Aaron Fox (9)	Golden 1 Center; 17,583	36–36
73	March 24	@ L. A. Lakers	L 106–111	Marvin Bagley (25)	Marvin Bagley (11)	Barnes, Fox, Bogdanović (5)	Staples Center; 18,997	36–37
74	March 26	@ Dallas	W 125–121	De'Aaron Fox (23)	Willie Cauley-Stein (7)	De'Aaron Fox (8)	American Airlines Center; 20,168	37–37
75	March 28	@ New Orleans	L 118–121	Buddy Hield (27)	Willie Cauley-Stein (12)	De'Aaron Fox (12)	Smoothie King Center; 13,976	37–38
76	March 30	@ Houston	L 108–119	Bogdan Bogdanović (24)	Marvin Bagley (12)	De'Aaron Fox (10)	Toyota Center; 18,055	37–39
77	March 31	@ San Antonio	W 113–106	Buddy Hield (26)	Kosta Koufos (11)	Bogdanović, Fox (5)	AT&T Center; 18,407	38–39

April : 1–4 (home: 1–2; road: 0–2)

Game	Date	Team	Score	High points	High rebounds	High assists	Location Attendance	Record
78	April 2	Houston	L 105–130	Buddy Hield (20)	Corey Brewer (10)	Hield, Fox (5)	Golden 1 Center; 17,583	38–40
79	April 4	Cleveland	W 117–104	Buddy Hield (23)	Willie Cauley-Stein (9)	De'Aaron Fox (10)	Golden 1 Center; 17,583	39–40
80	April 5	@ Utah	L 98–119	Buddy Hield (17)	Marvin Bagley (12)	Yogi Ferrell (5)	Vivint Smart Home Arena; 18,306	39–41
81	April 7	New Orleans	L 129–133	Harrison Barnes (29)	Marvin Bagley (14)	De'Aaron Fox (11)	Golden 1 Center; 17,583	39–42
82	April 10	@ Portland	L 131–136	Marvin Bagley (20)	Marvin Bagley (9)	De'Aaron Fox (9)	Moda Center; 19,814	39–43

2018–19 season schedule

== Player statistics ==
Player	Pos.	GP	GS	MP	Reb.	Ast.	Stl.	Blk.	Pts.
Marvin Bagley	PF	62	4	1,567	471	62	33	59	923
Harrison Barnes^{≠}	SF	28	28	949	154	53	17	2	399
Nemanja Bjelica	PF	77	70	1,788	444	147	54	56	741
Bogdan Bogdanović	SG	70	17	1,947	243	267	72	15	990
Corey Brewer^{≠}	SF	24	0	352	59	29	20	5	98
Alec Burks^{≠}	SG	13	0	127	22	10	8	1	22
Willie Cauley-Stein	C	81	81	2,213	678	194	96	51	965
Yogi Ferrell	PG	71	3	1,067	109	137	36	4	420
De'Aaron Fox	PG	81	81	2,546	304	590	133	45	1,399
Harry Giles	PF	58	0	820	222	85	31	22	408
Buddy Hield	SG	82	82	2,615	412	205	58	33	1,695
Justin Jackson^{†}	SF	52	3	1,083	146	68	23	13	346
B. J. Johnson^{≠}	SF	1	0	6	0	0	0	0	2
Kosta Koufos	C	42	1	502	177	36	15	18	156
Skal Labissière^{†}	PF	13	0	113	24	6	2	3	36
Frank Mason	PG	38	0	435	43	84	16	4	195
Ben McLemore^{‡}	SG	19	0	158	17	4	6	3	75
Iman Shumpert^{†}	SG	42	40	1,099	129	91	47	20	374
Caleb Swanigan^{≠}	PF	3	0	33	12	4	2	1	8
Troy Williams	SF	21	0	312	59	11	10	8	111

After all games.
^{‡}Waived during the season
^{†}Traded during the season
^{≠}Acquired during the season

== Transactions ==
=== Trades ===
June 21, 2018	To Sacramento Kings 2019 second-round pick 2021 Miami second-round pick Cash considerations	To Portland Trail Blazers Draft rights to Gary Trent Jr.
July 17, 2018	To Sacramento Kings Deyonta Davis; Ben McLemore; 2021 Memphis second-round pick Cash considerations	To Memphis Grizzlies Garrett Temple
February 6, 2019	To Sacramento Kings Harrison Barnes	To Dallas Mavericks Zach Randolph; Justin Jackson

=== Free agency ===
==== Additions ====
Player	Signed	Former team
Nemanja Bjelica	July 21, 2018	Minnesota Timberwolves
Yogi Ferrell	July 23, 2018	Dallas Mavericks
Wenyen Gabriel	Two-way contract	Kentucky Wildcats
Jamel Artis	September 24, 2018	Orlando Magic

==== Subtractions ====
Player	Reason left	New team
Nigel Hayes	Waived	(Turkey) Galatasaray Odeabank
Jack Cooley	Free agent	(Italy) Dinamo Sassari
Bruno Caboclo	Free agent	Houston Rockets
Vince Carter	Free agent	Atlanta Hawks
Deyonta Davis	Waived	Santa Cruz Warriors
