= 2018–19 Los Angeles Clippers season =

NBA professional basketball team season

- Head coach: Doc Rivers
- General manager: Michael Winger
- Owners: Steve Ballmer
- Arena: Staples Center

Results
- Record: 48–34 (.585)
- Place: Division: 2nd (Pacific); Conference: 8th (Western)
- Playoff finish: First round (lost to Warriors 2–4)
- Stats at Basketball Reference

Local media
- Television: Fox Sports West and Prime Ticket; KCOP-TV
- Radio: KLAC

The 2018–19 Los Angeles Clippers season was the 49th season of the franchise in the National Basketball Association (NBA), their 41st season in Southern California, and their 35th season in Los Angeles.

For the first time since the 2014–15 season, Austin Rivers was not on the roster following a trade to the Washington Wizards in exchange for Marcin Gortat, ending the father-son duo with his father, Doc Rivers. Additionally, longtime center DeAndre Jordan opted out of his contract with the Clippers, and became a free agent. On July 6, 2018, he signed a one-year deal with the Dallas Mavericks.

In their first full season without stars Chris Paul, Blake Griffin, and DeAndre Jordan, the Clippers still produced a winning season by March 19, and clinched a playoff berth on March 26, 2019, following a victory over the Minnesota Timberwolves.

In the playoffs, the Clippers faced the defending two-time NBA champion Golden State Warriors in the first round, losing in six games. The two teams previously met in the 2014 playoffs, in which the Clippers won in seven games amidst a scandal surrounding former owner Donald Sterling. They were the first team since the 2016 playoffs to beat the Warriors twice on the road.

In game 2 of the first round, the Clippers set an NBA record for the largest comeback in playoff history, overcoming a 31-point deficit in the third quarter, en route to defeating the Warriors 135–131 to tie the series 1–1.

== Draft ==
Round	Pick	Player	Position	Nationality	College
1	12	Miles Bridges	SF	United States	Michigan State
1	13	Jerome Robinson	SG	United States	Boston College

The Clippers entered the draft with two draft lottery picks; both fell within the lottery. The 12th overall pick was acquired from the Detroit Pistons as part of the Blake Griffin trade, while the 13th pick was their own. They had traded their second-round selection to the Philadelphia 76ers in 2014 before being ultimately used by the Denver Nuggets on draft night. On draft night, they traded the rights to the 12th pick Miles Bridges and two future second-round picks to the Charlotte Hornets for the rights to the 11th pick Shai Gilgeous-Alexander.

== Roster ==
2018–19 Los Angeles Clippers roster
Players

Pos.	No.	Player	Height	Weight	DOB	From
G	21	Patrick Beverley	6 ft 1 in (1.85 m)	185 lb (84 kg)	1988–07–12	Arkansas
G	11	Justin Bibbs	6 ft 5 in (1.96 m)	220 lb (100 kg)	1996–01–14	Virginia Tech
F	22	Wilson Chandler	6 ft 9 in (2.06 m)	225 lb (102 kg)	1987–05–10	DePaul
C	31	Ángel Delgado (TW)	6 ft 10 in (2.08 m)	245 lb (111 kg)	1994–11–20	Seton Hall
F	8	Danilo Gallinari	6 ft 10 in (2.08 m)	225 lb (102 kg)	1988–08–08	Italy
G	2	Shai Gilgeous-Alexander	6 ft 6 in (1.98 m)	181 lb (82 kg)	1998–07–12	Kentucky
F	4	JaMychal Green	6 ft 9 in (2.06 m)	227 lb (103 kg)	1990–06–21	Alabama
F/C	5	Montrezl Harrell	6 ft 8 in (2.03 m)	240 lb (109 kg)	1994–01–26	Louisville
G/F	19	Rodney McGruder	6 ft 4 in (1.93 m)	200 lb (91 kg)	1991–07–29	Kansas State
F	15	Johnathan Motley (TW)	6 ft 10 in (2.08 m)	230 lb (104 kg)	1995–05–04	Baylor
G	10	Jerome Robinson	6 ft 5 in (1.96 m)	188 lb (85 kg)	1997–02–22	Boston College
G	20	Landry Shamet	6 ft 5 in (1.96 m)	188 lb (85 kg)	1997–03–13	Wichita State
G/F	17	Garrett Temple	6 ft 6 in (1.98 m)	195 lb (88 kg)	1986–05–08	LSU
G	0	Sindarius Thornwell	6 ft 5 in (1.96 m)	215 lb (98 kg)	1994–11–15	South Carolina
G	9	Tyrone Wallace	6 ft 5 in (1.96 m)	198 lb (90 kg)	1994–06–10	California
G	23	Lou Williams	6 ft 1 in (1.85 m)	175 lb (79 kg)	1986–10–27	South Gwinnett HS (GA)
C	40	Ivica Zubac	7 ft 1 in (2.16 m)	240 lb (109 kg)	1997–03–18	Croatia

Coaches
Head coach
- Doc Rivers
Assistant(s)
- Sam Cassell
- Armond Hill
- Casey Hill
- Rex Kalamian
- Brendan O'Connor
- John Welch
- Natalie Nakase (player development)

Legend
- (DP) Unsigned draft pick
- (FA) Free agent
- (S) Suspended
- (GL) On assignment to G League affiliate
- (TW) Two-way affiliate player
- Injured

Roster
Updated: 2019–02–09

=== Roster notes ===
- Forward Luc Mbah a Moute was on his second tour of duty with the Clippers. Played in only 4 games before getting a knee injury and was eventually waived. He previously played for the team from 2015 to 2017.
- Center Ivica Zubac is the 29th former Lakers player to play for the Clippers and only the second time it occurred through a direct trade between the two teams since 1983.

== Standings ==
=== Division ===
Pacific Division	W	L	PCT	GB	Home	Road	Div	GP
c – Golden State Warriors	57	25	.695	–	30‍–‍11	27‍–‍14	13–3	82
x – Los Angeles Clippers	48	34	.585	9.0	26‍–‍15	22‍–‍19	11–5	82
Sacramento Kings	39	43	.476	18.0	24‍–‍17	15‍–‍26	4–12	82
Los Angeles Lakers	37	45	.451	20.0	22‍–‍19	15‍–‍26	9–7	82
Phoenix Suns	19	63	.232	38.0	12‍–‍29	7‍–‍34	3–13	82

=== By Conference ===
Western Conference
#	Team	W	L	PCT	GB	GP
1	c – Golden State Warriors *	57	25	.695	–	82
2	y – Denver Nuggets *	54	28	.659	3.0	82
3	x – Portland Trail Blazers	53	29	.646	4.0	82
4	y – Houston Rockets *	53	29	.646	4.0	82
5	x – Utah Jazz	50	32	.610	7.0	82
6	x – Oklahoma City Thunder	49	33	.598	8.0	82
7	x – San Antonio Spurs	48	34	.585	9.0	82
8	x – Los Angeles Clippers	48	34	.585	9.0	82
9	Sacramento Kings	39	43	.476	18.0	82
10	Los Angeles Lakers	37	45	.451	20.0	82
11	Minnesota Timberwolves	36	46	.439	21.0	82
12	Memphis Grizzlies	33	49	.402	24.0	82
13	New Orleans Pelicans	33	49	.402	24.0	82
14	Dallas Mavericks	33	49	.402	24.0	82
15	Phoenix Suns	19	63	.232	38.0	82

== Game log ==
=== Preseason ===
2018 preseason game log
Total: 5–0 (home: 4–0; road: 1–0)
Preseason: 5–0 (home: 4–0; road: 1–0)

Game	Date	Team	Score	High points	High rebounds	High assists	Location Attendance	Record
1	September 30	Sydney	W 110–91	Tobias Harris (20)	Tobias Harris (11)	Beverley, Gallinari, Harris (5)	Stan Sheriff Center; 6,911	1–0
2	October 3	Minnesota	W 128–101	Tobias Harris (23)	Gallinari, Harris, Wallace, Harrell (6)	Beverley, Gilgeous-Alexander (5)	Staples Center; 10,099	2–0
3	October 6	@ L.A. Lakers	W 103–87	Lou Williams (19)	Marcin Gortat (9)	Avery Bradley (4)	Honda Center; 18,040	3–0
4	October 9	Denver	W 109–103	Danilo Gallinari (16)	Boban Marjanovic (12)	Lou Williams (5)	Staples Center; 10,187	4–0
5	October 11	Maccabi	W 124–76	Boban Marjanovic (18)	Boban Marjanovic (12)	Shai Gilgeous-Alexander (7)	Staples Center; 8,056	5–0

2018–19 season schedule

=== Regular season ===
2018–19 game log
Total: 48–34 (home: 26–15; road: 22–19)
October: 4–3 (home: 3–1; road: 1–2)

Game	Date	Team	Score	High points	High rebounds	High assists	Location Attendance	Record
1	October 17	Denver	98–107	Tobias Harris (19)	Tobias Harris (10)	Patrick Beverley (6)	Staples Center; 19,068	0–1
2	October 19	Oklahoma City	108–92	Harris, Gallinari (26)	Marcin Gortat (12)	Patrick Beverley (5)	Staples Center; 14,816	1–1
3	October 21	Houston	115–112	Tobias Harris (23)	Danilo Gallinari (9)	Gallinari, Gilgeous-Alexander (4)	Staples Center; 16,149	2–1
4	October 23	@ New Orleans	109–116	Tobias Harris (26)	Patrick Beverley (10)	Patrick Beverley (8)	Smoothie King Center; 14,625	2–2
5	October 26	@ Houston	133–113	Montrezl Harrell (30)	Tobias Harris (9)	Milos Teodosic (5)	Toyota Center; 18,055	3–2
6	October 28	Washington	136–104	Tobias Harris (22)	Tobias Harris (11)	Shai Gilgeous-Alexander (7)	Staples Center; 16,491	4–2
7	October 30	@ Oklahoma City	110–128	Danilo Gallinari (27)	Patrick Beverley (7)	Patrick Beverley (6)	Chesapeake Energy Arena; 18,203	4–3

November : 11–3 (home: 6–0; road: 5–3)

Game	Date	Team	Score	High points	High rebounds	High assists	Location Attendance	Record
8	November 1	@ Philadelphia	113–122	Lou Williams (26)	Boban Marjanovic (11)	Patrick Beverley (4)	Wells Fargo Center; 20,246	4–4
9	November 2	@ Orlando	120–95	Lou Williams (28)	Montrezl Harrell (12)	Mike Scott (4)	Amway Center; 15,953	5–4
10	November 5	Minnesota	120–109	Gallinari, Harris (22)	Tobias Harris (10)	Lou Williams (6)	Staples Center; 16,564	6–4
11	November 8	@ Portland	105–116	Gallinari, Williams (20)	Tobias Harris (11)	Lou Williams (7)	Moda Center; 19,170	6–5
12	November 10	Milwaukee	128–126 (OT)	Montrezl Harrell (26)	Tobias Harris (11)	Lou Williams (10)	Staples Center; 17,486	7–5
13	November 12	Golden State	121–116 (OT)	Lou Williams (25)	Harris, Harrell (8)	Lou Williams (6)	Staples Center; 19,068	8–5
14	November 15	San Antonio	116–111	Lou Williams (23)	Tobias Harris (8)	Harris, Harrell (5)	Staples Center; 17,463	9–5
15	November 17	@ Brooklyn	127–119	Danilo Gallinari (28)	Montrezl Harrell (10)	Patrick Beverley (8)	Barclays Center; 12,944	10–5
16	November 19	@ Atlanta	127–119	Montrezl Harrell (25)	Montrezl Harrell (11)	Lou Williams (11)	State Farm Arena; 14,323	11–5
17	November 20	@ Washington	118–125	Tobias Harris (29)	Harris, Harrell (9)	Gallinari, Beverley (5)	Capital One Arena; 14,499	11–6
18	November 23	Memphis	112–107 (OT)	Montrezl Harrell (22)	Montrezl Harrell (11)	Lou Williams (6)	Staples Center; 15,418	12–6
19	November 25	@ Portland	104–100	Tobias Harris (34)	Tobias Harris (11)	Danilo Gallinari (5)	Moda Center; 19,138	13–6
20	November 28	Phoenix	115–99	Danilo Gallinari (28)	Boban Marjanovic (11)	Shai Gilgeous-Alexander (6)	Staples Center; 16,372	14–6
21	November 29	@ Sacramento	133–121	Tobias Harris (28)	Harris, Harrell, Scott (6)	Avery Bradley (6)	Golden 1 Center; 17,583	15–6

December : 6–9 (home: 3–4; road: 3–5)

Game	Date	Team	Score	High points	High rebounds	High assists	Location Attendance	Record
22	December 2	@ Dallas	110–114	Montrezl Harrell (23)	Montrezl Harrell (10)	Lou Williams (8)	American Airlines Center; 19,551	15–7
23	December 3	@ New Orleans	129–126	Tobias Harris (27)	Marcin Gortat (12)	Patrick Beverley (6)	Smoothie King Center; 13,822	16–7
24	December 5	@ Memphis	86–96	Boban Marjanovic (19)	Tobias Harris (12)	Lou Williams (7)	FedExForum; 14,144	16–8
25	December 8	Miami	98–121	Tobias Harris (20)	Danilo Gallinari (10)	Lou Williams (5)	Staples Center; 17,113	16–9
26	December 10	@ Phoenix	123–119 (OT)	Tobias Harris (33)	Harris, Marjanovic (8)	Shai Gilgeous-Alexander (5)	Talking Stick Resort Arena; 12,088	17–9
27	December 11	Toronto	99–123	Boban Marjanovic (18)	Mike Scott (11)	Tyrone Wallace (6)	Staples Center; 17,812	17–10
28	December 13	@ San Antonio	87–125	Tobias Harris (17)	Marcin Gortat (8)	Marcin Gortat (5)	AT&T Center; 18,354	17–11
29	December 15	@ Oklahoma City	104–110	Danilo Gallinari (28)	Tobias Harris (9)	Avery Bradley (4)	Chesapeake Energy Arena; 18,203	17–12
30	December 17	Portland	127–131	Tobias Harris (39)	Tobias Harris (11)	Patrick Beverley (11)	Staples Center; 16,030	17–13
31	December 20	Dallas	125–121	Danilo Gallinari (32)	Tobias Harris (9)	Lou Williams (8)	Staples Center; 17,528	18–13
32	December 22	Denver	132–111	Harris, Gallinari (21)	Danilo Gallinari (11)	Lou Williams (7)	Staples Center; 16,571	19–13
33	December 23	@ Golden State	127–129	Tobias Harris (32)	Danilo Gallinari (11)	Lou Williams (9)	Oracle Arena; 19,596	19–14
34	December 26	Sacramento	127–118	Lou Williams (24)	Montrezl Harrell (9)	Lou Williams (6)	Staples Center; 19,068	20–14
35	December 28	@ LA Lakers	118–107	Lou Williams (36)	Gallinari, Harris (10)	Marcin Gortat (5)	Staples Center; 18,997	21–14
36	December 29	San Antonio	111–122	Danilo Gallinari (21)	Danilo Gallinari (9)	Lou Williams (7)	Staples Center; 19,068	21–15

January : 7–9 (home: 3–7; road: 4–2)

Game	Date	Team	Score	High points	High rebounds	High assists	Location Attendance	Record
37	January 1	Philadelphia	113–119	Lou Williams (22)	Montrezl Harrell (10)	Shai Gilgeous-Alexander (5)	Staples Center; 17,868	21–16
38	January 4	@ Phoenix	121–111	Gallinari, L. Williams (21)	Marcin Gortat (13)	Shai Gilgeous-Alexander (9)	Talking Stick Resort Arena; 14,764	22–16
39	January 6	Orlando	106–96	Tobias Harris (28)	Marcin Gortat (10)	Marcin Gortat (6)	Staples Center; 16,616	23–16
40	January 8	Charlotte	128–109	Lou Williams (27)	Montrezl Harrell (11)	Lou Williams (10)	Staples Center; 15,275	24–16
41	January 10	@ Denver	100–121	Lou Williams (19)	Tobias Harris (11)	Lou Williams (5)	Pepsi Center; 15,742	24–17
42	January 12	Detroit	104–109	Danilo Gallinari (23)	Tobias Harris (10)	Montrezl Harrell (6)	Staples Center; 16,540	24–18
43	January 14	New Orleans	117–121	Montrezl Harrell (26)	Patrick Beverley (11)	Patrick Beverley (7)	Staples Center; 15,283	24–19
44	January 16	Utah	109–129	Lou Williams (23)	Montrezl Harrell (7)	Lou Williams (6)	Staples Center; 15,535	24–20
45	January 18	Golden State	94–112	Tobias Harris (28)	Harris, Harrell (9)	Shai Gilgeous-Alexander (5)	Staples Center; 19,068	24–21
46	January 20	@ San Antonio	103–95	Tobias Harris (27)	Patrick Beverley (12)	Tobias Harris (9)	AT&T Center; 18,354	25–21
47	January 22	@ Dallas	98–106	Patrick Beverley (16)	Patrick Beverley (9)	Lou Williams (4)	American Airlines Center; 19,466	25–22
48	January 23	@ Miami	111–99	Tobias Harris (31)	Marcin Gortat (8)	Harris, L. Williams (6)	American Airlines Arena; 19,600	26–22
49	January 25	@ Chicago	106–101	Tobias Harris (29)	Lou Williams (10)	Lou Williams (10)	United Center; 19,354	27–22
50	January 27	Sacramento	122–108	Montrezl Harrell (25)	Patrick Beverley (10)	Lou Williams (10)	Staples Center; 19,068	28–22
51	January 28	Atlanta	118–123	Tobias Harris (30)	Patrick Beverley (10)	Lou Williams (9)	Staples Center; 17,382	28–23
52	January 31	LA Lakers	120–123 (OT)	Lou Williams (24)	Harris, Bradley, Beverley, Harrell (8)	Tobias Harris (8)	Staples Center; 19,068	28–24

February : 6–5 (home: 2–0; road: 4–5)

Game	Date	Team	Score	High points	High rebounds	High assists	Location Attendance	Record
53	February 2	@ Detroit	111–101	Lou Williams (39)	Boban Marjanovic (10)	Lou Williams (9)	Little Caesars Arena; 17,862	29–24
54	February 3	@ Toronto	103–121	Shai Gilgeous-Alexander (19)	Boban Marjanovic (9)	Gilgeous-Alexander, L. Williams (3)	Scotiabank Arena; 19,800	29–25
55	February 5	@ Charlotte	117–115	Tobias Harris (34)	Montrezl Harrell (10)	Lou Williams (6)	Spectrum Center; 14,300	30–25
56	February 7	@ Indiana	92–116	Montrezl Harrell (19)	Johnathan Motley (7)	Shai Gilgeous-Alexander (6)	Bankers Life Fieldhouse; 15,756	30–26
57	February 9	@ Boston	123–112	Montrezl Harrell (21)	Danilo Gallinari (10)	Patrick Beverley (7)	TD Garden; 18,624	31–26
58	February 11	@ Minnesota	120–130	Lou Williams (45)	Montrezl Harrell (12)	Beverly, Harrell (6)	Target Center; 13,782	31–27
59	February 13	Phoenix	134–107	Lou Williams (30)	Green, Zubac (7)	Lou Williams (10)	Staples Center; 17,703	32–27
60	February 22	@ Memphis	112–106	Montrezl Harrell (30)	Patrick Beverley (9)	Lou Williams (8)	FedExForum; 16,444	33–27
61	February 24	@ Denver	96–123	Lou Williams (24)	JaMychal Green (9)	Beverly, Gilgeous-Alexander (4)	Pepsi Center; 19,956	33–28
62	February 25	Dallas	121–112	Montrezl Harrell (32)	Beverly, Green, Zubac (8)	Lou Williams (10)	Staples Center; 19,068	34–28
63	February 27	@ Utah	105–111	Lou Williams (18)	Patrick Beverley (10)	Lou Williams (6)	Vivint Smart Home Arena; 18,306	34–29

March : 13–2 (home: 8–1; road: 5–1)

Game	Date	Team	Score	High points	High rebounds	High assists	Location Attendance	Record
64	March 1	@ Sacramento	116–109	Landry Shamet (20)	Ivica Zubac (8)	Lou Williams (10)	Golden 1 Center; 17,583	35–29
65	March 3	N. Y. Knicks	128–107	Landry Shamet (21)	Ivica Zubac (11)	Lou Williams (6)	Staples Center; 19,068	36–29
66	March 4	@ LA Lakers	113–105	Danilo Gallinari (23)	Montrezl Harrell (11)	L. Williams, Harrell (5)	Staples Center; 18,997	37–29
67	March 8	Oklahoma City	118–110	Lou Williams (40)	JaMychal Green (9)	Patrick Beverley (6)	Staples Center; 17,915	38–29
68	March 11	Boston	140–115	Lou Williams (34)	Green, Zubac (7)	Patrick Beverley (7)	Staples Center; 19,068	39–29
69	March 12	Portland	104–125	Montrezl Harrell (22)	Ivica Zubac (16)	Patrick Beverley (7)	Staples Center; 16,686	39–30
70	March 15	Chicago	128–121	Danilo Gallinari (27)	Patrick Beverley (8)	Beverly, Gilgeous-Alexander (7)	Staples Center; 17,404	40–30
71	March 17	Brooklyn	119–116	Lou Williams (25)	Danilo Gallinari (11)	Shai Gilgeous-Alexander (10)	Staples Center; 17,247	41–30
72	March 19	Indiana	115–109	Danilo Gallinari (24)	Montrezl Harrell (12)	Lou Williams (9)	Staples Center; 16,043	42–30
73	March 22	@ Cleveland	110–108	Danilo Gallinari (27)	JaMychal Green (9)	Lou Williams (6)	Quicken Loans Arena; 19,432	43–30
74	March 24	@ N. Y. Knicks	124–113	Lou Williams (29)	Ivica Zubac (10)	Shai Gilgeous-Alexander (8)	Madison Square Garden; 18,263	44–30
75	March 26	@ Minnesota	122–111	Danilo Gallinari (25)	Danilo Gallinari (10)	Lou Williams (7)	Target Center; 13,176	45–30
76	March 28	@ Milwaukee	118–128	Shai Gilgeous-Alexander (21)	Gallinari, Green (8)	Garrett Temple (5)	Fiserv Forum; 17,922	45–31
77	March 30	Cleveland	132–108	Montrezl Harrell (23)	JaMychal Green (10)	Shai Gilgeous-Alexander (8)	Staples Center; 16,439	46–31
78	March 31	Memphis	113–96	Danilo Gallinari (27)	Danilo Gallinari (15)	Danilo Gallinari (5)	Staples Center; 16,740	47–31

April : 1–3 (home: 1–2; road: 0–1)

Game	Date	Team	Score	High points	High rebounds	High assists	Location Attendance	Record
79	April 3	Houston	103–135	Shai Gilgeous-Alexander (20)	Ivica Zubac (8)	Lou Williams (7)	Staples Center; 17,593	47–32
80	April 5	LA Lakers	117–122	Danilo Gallinari (27)	Gilgeous-Alexander, Harrell, Zubac (8)	Gallinari, Williams (8)	Staples Center; 17,910	47–33
81	April 7	@ Golden State	104–131	Landry Shamet (17)	Ivica Zubac (8)	Lou Williams (5)	Oracle Arena; 19,596	47–34
82	April 10	Utah	143–137 (OT)	Montrezl Harrell (24)	Ivica Zubac (11)	Patrick Beverley (6)	Staples Center; 17,655	48–34

2018–19 season schedule

== Playoffs ==
=== Game log ===
2019 playoff game log
First Round: 2–4 (home: 0–3; road: 2–1)

Game	Date	Team	Score	High points	High rebounds	High assists	Location Attendance	Series
1	April 13	@ Golden State	L 104–121	Montrezl Harrell (26)	Danilo Gallinari (8)	Lou Williams (9)	Oracle Arena; 19,596	0–1
2	April 15	@ Golden State	W 135–131	Lou Williams (36)	Montrezl Harrell (10)	Lou Williams (11)	Oracle Arena; 19,596	1–1
3	April 18	Golden State	L 105–132	Ivica Zubac (18)	Ivica Zubac (15)	Lou Williams (6)	Staples Center; 19,068	1–2
4	April 21	Golden State	L 105–113	Shai Gilgeous-Alexander (25)	Patrick Beverley (10)	Patrick Beverley (5)	Staples Center; 19,068	1–3
5	April 24	@ Golden State	W 129–121	Lou Williams (33)	Patrick Beverley (14)	Lou Williams (10)	Oracle Arena; 19,596	2–3
6*	April 26	Golden State	L 110–129	Danilo Gallinari (29)	Patrick Beverley (14)	Williams, Beverley (7)	Staples Center; 19,068	2–4

2019 playoff schedule

== Player statistics ==
=== Regular season ===
Player	Pos.	GP	GS	MP	Reb.	Ast.	Stl.	Blk.	Pts.
Patrick Beverley	PG	78	49	2,137	388	300	67	43	596
Avery Bradley^{†}	SG	49	49	1,463	131	96	27	16	400
Wilson Chandler^{≠}	SF	15	1	226	47	10	3	3	64
Ángel Delgado	C	2	0	15	4	0	1	0	3
Danilo Gallinari	SF	68	68	2,059	417	178	49	23	1,346
Shai Gilgeous-Alexander	PG	82	73	2,174	232	270	96	45	889
Marcin Gortat^{‡}	C	47	43	751	261	65	6	24	233
JaMychal Green^{≠}	PF	24	2	471	157	14	12	8	208
Montrezl Harrell	C	82	5	2,158	535	162	71	110	1,361
Tobias Harris^{†}	PF	55	55	1,903	432	150	40	24	1,152
Boban Marjanović^{†}	C	36	9	376	152	22	11	17	242
Luc Mbah a Moute^{‡}	PF	4	0	61	7	2	1	1	20
Johnathan Motley	PF	22	0	156	51	11	5	3	102
Jerome Robinson	SG	33	0	320	41	19	11	3	112
Mike Scott^{†}	PF	52	0	748	174	44	17	8	248
Landry Shamet^{≠}	SG	25	23	694	56	58	13	2	273
Garrett Temple^{≠}	SG	26	6	510	64	37	26	5	123
Miloš Teodosić^{‡}	PG	15	0	150	16	32	3	1	48
Sindarius Thornwell	SG	64	1	313	44	18	14	7	62
Tyrone Wallace	PG	62	0	628	101	42	21	7	218
Lou Williams	SG	75	1	1,993	222	402	57	11	1,498
Ivica Zubac^{≠}	C	26	25	524	200	38	10	24	244

After all games.
^{‡}Waived during the season
^{†}Traded during the season
^{≠}Acquired during the season

=== Playoffs ===
Player	Pos.	GP	GS	MP	Reb.	Ast.	Stl.	Blk.	Pts.
Patrick Beverley	PG	6	6	195	48	28	6	6	59
Wilson Chandler	SF	4	0	52	6	2	2	0	15
Danilo Gallinari	SF	6	6	201	37	16	8	1	119
Shai Gilgeous-Alexander	PG	6	6	173	16	19	6	5	82
JaMychal Green	PF	6	3	141	32	5	4	0	66
Montrezl Harrell	C	6	0	158	33	13	3	4	110
Jerome Robinson	SG	5	0	46	6	7	2	0	18
Landry Shamet	SG	6	6	174	12	10	6	0	46
Garrett Temple	SG	6	0	63	7	2	3	1	14
Sindarius Thornwell	SG	4	0	12	4	0	1	0	5
Tyrone Wallace	PG	2	0	11	1	3	0	0	4
Lou Williams	SG	6	0	176	17	46	5	1	130
Ivica Zubac	C	4	3	39	22	1	2	2	20

== Transactions ==
=== Trades ===
June 21, 2018	To Los Angeles Clippers Draft rights to Shai Gilgeous-Alexander	To Charlotte Hornets Draft rights to Miles Bridges; Two future second-round picks
June 26, 2018	To Los Angeles Clippers Marcin Gortat	To Washington Wizards Austin Rivers
July 23, 2018	To Los Angeles Clippers Johnathan Motley; Draft rights to Renaldas Seibutis	To Dallas Mavericks Draft rights to Maarty Leunen; Cash considerations
August 7, 2018	To Los Angeles Clippers Draft rights to Vladimir Veremeenko	To Cleveland Cavaliers Sam Dekker; Cash considerations Draft rights to Renaldas Seibutis
October 15, 2018	To Los Angeles Clippers Alexis Ajinça	To New Orleans Pelicans Wesley Johnson
February 6, 2019	To Los Angeles Clippers Wilson Chandler; Mike Muscala; Landry Shamet; 2020 protected first-round pick 2021 unprotected first-round pick 2021 second-round pick (from Miami); 2023 second-round pick (from Detroit)	To Philadelphia 76ers Tobias Harris; Boban Marjanovic; Mike Scott
February 7, 2019	To Los Angeles Clippers JaMychal Green; Garrett Temple	To Memphis Grizzlies Avery Bradley
February 7, 2019	To Los Angeles Clippers Ivica Zubac; Michael Beasley	To Los Angeles Lakers Mike Muscala

=== Free agency ===
==== Re-signed ====
Player	Signed
Avery Bradley	July 9, 2018
Montrezl Harrell	July 24, 2018
Tyrone Wallace	September 5, 2018 (matched offer by New Orleans Pelicans)

==== Additions ====
Player	Signed	Former team
Ángel Delgado	July 6, 2018, Two-way contract	Seton Hall Pirates (NCAA)
Mike Scott	July 9, 2018	Washington Wizards
Luc Mbah a Moute	July 19, 2018	Houston Rockets
Justin Bibbs	March 13, 2019, 1st 10-day contract March 23, 2019, 2nd 10-day contract	Maine Red Claws
Rodney McGruder	April 9, 2019, claimed off waivers	Miami Heat

==== Subtractions ====
Player	Reason left	New team
DeAndre Jordan	Free agency, July 8, 2018	Dallas Mavericks
C.J. Williams	Waived, July 27, 2018	Minnesota Timberwolves
Jawun Evans	Waived, October 15, 2018	Northern Arizona Suns
Alexis Ajinça	Waived, October 15, 2018	ASVEL Basket (LNB Pro A)
Milos Teodosic	Waived, February 7, 2019	Virtus Bologna (LBA)
Marcin Gortat	Waived, February 7, 2019	Washington Wizards (assistant coach)
Michael Beasley	Waived, February 9, 2019	Guangdong Southern Tigers (CBA)
Justin Bibbs	Contract expired, April 1, 2019	Maine Red Claws
Luc Mbah a Moute	Waived, April 7, 2019	Houston Rockets
