= 2019–20 Brooklyn Nets season =

Season of National Basketball Association team the Brooklyn Nets

- Head coach: Kenny Atkinson (resigned); Jacque Vaughn
- General manager: Sean Marks
- Owners: Joseph Tsai
- Arena: Barclays Center

Results
- Record: 35–37 (.486)
- Place: Division: 4th (Atlantic); Conference: 7th (Eastern)
- Playoff finish: First round (lost to Raptors 0–4)
- Stats at Basketball Reference

Local media
- Television: YES Network, WPIX
- Radio: WFAN AM/FM

The 2019–20 Brooklyn Nets season was the 44th season of the franchise in the National Basketball Association (NBA), 53rd season overall, and its eighth season playing in the New York City borough of Brooklyn. Six players from the 2018–19 team, including D'Angelo Russell, became free agents.

Before the season, on September 18, 2019, Joseph Tsai acquired the full ownership of the Nets from Mikhail Prokhorov. On March 7, 2020, Kenny Atkinson resigned as the Nets' head coach and was replaced by Jacque Vaughn on an interim basis.

The season was suspended by league officials following the games of March 11 after it was reported that Rudy Gobert tested positive for COVID-19. On March 17, the Nets announced that four of its players tested positive for COVID-19, including Kevin Durant. On April 1, general manager Sean Marks announced that all four players recovered and were cleared by local health officials. On June 4, the regular season was declared over with the remaining games being cancelled when the NBA Board of Governors approved a plan that would restart the season with 22 teams returning to play on July 31, which was approved by the National Basketball Players Association the next day.

The Nets made the playoffs for a second consecutive season and faced the Toronto Raptors in the first round, where they were swept in four games.

== Draft ==
2019 NBA draft picks
Round	Pick	Player	Position	Nationality	School/club
1	17	Nickeil Alexander-Walker	SG	Canada	Virginia Tech
1	27	Mfiondu Kabengele	C	Canada	Florida State
2	31	Nic Claxton	PF	U.S. Virgin Islands	Georgia

The Nets entered the draft holding two first-round picks and one second-round pick. On June 6, the Nets agreed to trade their 17th pick of the draft, a future first-round pick and Allen Crabbe to the Atlanta Hawks in exchange for Taurean Prince and a 2021 second-round pick, though the trade was not finalized until July 6. The team used their 17th overall pick to draft Nickeil Alexander-Walker, who was sent to the Atlanta Hawks in the Allen Crabbe trade. With the 27th pick, the Nets selected Mfiondu Kabengele, who was traded to the Los Angeles Clippers in exchange to draft rights of Jaylen Hands, and used the 31st pick to draft Nic Claxton.

== Roster ==
2019–20 Brooklyn Nets roster
Players

Pos.	No.	Player	Height	Weight	DOB	From
C	31	Jarrett Allen	6 ft 11 in (2.11 m)	243 lb (110 kg)	1998-04-21	Texas
G/F	10	Justin Anderson	6 ft 5 in (1.96 m)	231 lb (105 kg)	1993-11-19	Virginia
F	21	Wilson Chandler	6 ft 8 in (2.03 m)	235 lb (107 kg)	1987-05-10	DePaul
G	4	Chris Chiozza (TW)	5 ft 11 in (1.80 m)	175 lb (79 kg)	1995-11-25	Florida
F/C	33	Nic Claxton	6 ft 11 in (2.11 m)	215 lb (98 kg)	1999-04-17	Georgia
G	1	Jamal Crawford	6 ft 5 in (1.96 m)	185 lb (84 kg)	1980-03-26	Michigan
G	26	Spencer Dinwiddie	6 ft 5 in (1.96 m)	215 lb (98 kg)	1993-04-06	Colorado
F	7	Kevin Durant	6 ft 10 in (2.08 m)	240 lb (109 kg)	1988-09-29	Texas
F/C	45	Donta Hall	6 ft 9 in (2.06 m)	229 lb (104 kg)	1997-08-07	Alabama
G/F	12	Joe Harris	6 ft 6 in (1.98 m)	220 lb (100 kg)	1991-09-07	Virginia
G	11	Kyrie Irving	6 ft 2 in (1.88 m)	195 lb (88 kg)	1992-03-23	Duke
G	8	Tyler Johnson	6 ft 3 in (1.91 m)	186 lb (84 kg)	1992-05-07	Fresno State
C	6	DeAndre Jordan	6 ft 11 in (2.11 m)	265 lb (120 kg)	1988-07-21	Texas A&M
F	00	Rodions Kurucs	6 ft 9 in (2.06 m)	228 lb (103 kg)	1998-02-05	Latvia
G	22	Caris LeVert	6 ft 6 in (1.98 m)	205 lb (93 kg)	1994-08-25	Michigan
G/F	9	Timothé Luwawu-Cabarrot	6 ft 7 in (2.01 m)	220 lb (100 kg)	1995-05-09	France
G	0	Jeremiah Martin (TW)	6 ft 2 in (1.88 m)	185 lb (84 kg)	1996-06-19	Memphis
G/F	13	Džanan Musa	6 ft 9 in (2.06 m)	217 lb (98 kg)	1999-05-08	Bosnia and Herzegovina
F	2	Taurean Prince	6 ft 7 in (2.01 m)	218 lb (99 kg)	1994-03-22	Baylor
G/F	17	Garrett Temple	6 ft 5 in (1.96 m)	195 lb (88 kg)	1986-05-08	LSU
F	42	Lance Thomas	6 ft 8 in (2.03 m)	235 lb (107 kg)	1988-04-24	Duke

Coaches
Head coach
- Jacque Vaughn
Assistant(s)
- Bret Brielmaier
- Travon Bryant
- Adam Harrington
- Jordan Ott
- Tiago Splitter
- Jacque Vaughn

Legend
- (DP) Unsigned draft pick
- (FA) Free agent
- (S) Suspended
- (GL) On assignment to G League affiliate
- (TW) Two-way affiliate player
- Injured

Roster
Updated: August 23, 2020

== Standings ==
=== Division ===
Atlantic Division	W	L	PCT	GB	Home	Road	Div	GP
y – Toronto Raptors	53	19	.736	–	26‍–‍10	27‍–‍9	9–5	72
x – Boston Celtics	48	24	.667	5.0	26‍–‍10	22‍–‍14	9–6	72
x – Philadelphia 76ers	43	30	.589	10.5	31‍–‍4	12‍–‍26	11–5	73
x – Brooklyn Nets	35	37	.486	18.0	20‍–‍16	15‍–‍21	6–10	72
New York Knicks	21	45	.318	29.0	11‍–‍22	10‍–‍23	2–11	66

=== Conference ===
Eastern Conference
#	Team	W	L	PCT	GB	GP
1	z – Milwaukee Bucks *	56	17	.767	–	73
2	y – Toronto Raptors *	53	19	.736	2.5	72
3	x – Boston Celtics	48	24	.667	7.5	72
4	x – Indiana Pacers	45	28	.616	11.0	73
5	y – Miami Heat *	44	29	.603	12.0	73
6	x – Philadelphia 76ers	43	30	.589	13.0	73
7	x – Brooklyn Nets	35	37	.486	20.5	72
8	x – Orlando Magic	33	40	.452	23.0	73
9	Washington Wizards	25	47	.347	30.5	72
10	Charlotte Hornets	23	42	.354	29.0	65
11	Chicago Bulls	22	43	.338	30.0	65
12	New York Knicks	21	45	.318	31.5	66
13	Detroit Pistons	20	46	.303	32.5	66
14	Atlanta Hawks	20	47	.299	33.0	67
15	Cleveland Cavaliers	19	46	.292	33.0	65

== Game log ==
=== Preseason ===
The preseason schedule was announced on July 10, 2019. On September 10, the Nets announced a venue change from Nassau Coliseum to Barclays Center for the October 18 game against the Toronto Raptors.

2019 preseason game log
Total: 3–1 (home: 2–1; road: 1–0)
Preseason: 3–1 (home: 2–1; road: 1–0)

Game	Date	Team	Score	High points	High rebounds	High assists	Location Attendance	Record
1	October 4	Sesi/Franca	W 137–89	Prince (22)	Dinwiddie (12)	LeVert (9)	Barclays Center; 10,110	1–0
2	October 10	@ L.A. Lakers	W 114–111	Dinwiddie (20)	Kurucs (8)	Dinwiddie (7)	Mercedes-Benz Arena; 15,992	2–0
3	October 12	L.A. Lakers	W 91–77	LeVert (22)	Jordan (11)	LeVert (5)	Universiade Sports Center; 17,396	3–0
4	October 18	Toronto	L 107–123	Irving (19)	Jordan (9)	Dinwiddie, Irving (4)	Barclays Center; 12,380	3–1

2019–20 preseason schedule

=== Regular season ===
The regular season schedule was released on August 12, 2019. In June 2020, the Nets released a revised eight-game schedule for the regular season.

2019–20 game log
Total: 35–37 (home: 20–16; road: 15–21)
October: 1–3 (home: 1–2; road: 0–1)

Game	Date	Team	Score	High points	High rebounds	High assists	Location Attendance	Record
1	October 23	Minnesota	L 126–127 (OT)	Irving (50)	Prince (11)	Irving (7)	Barclays Center; 17,732	0–1
2	October 25	New York	W 113–109	Irving (26)	Allen, Jordan (11)	Dinwiddie, Irving (5)	Barclays Center; 17,732	1–1
3	October 27	@ Memphis	L 133–134 (OT)	Irving (37)	Allen (13)	Dinwiddie (8)	FedExForum; 15,517	1–2
4	October 30	Indiana	L 108–118	Irving (28)	Jordan (17)	Dinwiddie (7)	Barclays Center; 17,083	1–3

November: 9–6 (home: 5–1; road: 4–5)

Game	Date	Team	Score	High points	High rebounds	High assists	Location Attendance	Record
5	November 1	Houston	W 123–116	Prince (27)	Prince (12)	Irving (10)	Barclays Center; 17,732	2–3
6	November 2	@ Detroit	L 109–113	Irving, Prince (20)	Irving (11)	Irving (10)	Little Caesars Arena; 17,222	2–4
7	November 4	New Orleans	W 135–125	Irving (39)	Prince (11)	Irving (9)	Barclays Center; 17,194	3–4
8	November 8	@ Portland	W 119–115	Dinwiddie (34)	Allen, LeVert (9)	Irving (6)	Moda Center; 20,089	4–4
9	November 10	@ Phoenix	L 112–138	Dinwiddie (18)	Jordan (12)	Dinwiddie (6)	Talking Stick Resort Arena; 17,290	4–5
10	November 12	@ Utah	L 114–119	Irving (27)	Jordan (17)	Irving (5)	Vivint Smart Home Arena; 18,306	4–6
11	November 14	@ Denver	L 93–101	Allen, Dinwiddie, Irving (17)	Jordan (11)	Irving (9)	Pepsi Center; 18,394	4–7
12	November 16	@ Chicago	W 117–111	Dinwiddie (24)	Allen, Jordan, Musa (7)	Harris (8)	United Center; 19,148	5–7
13	November 18	Indiana	L 86–115	Dinwiddie (28)	Allen (12)	Dinwiddie (8)	Barclays Center; 14,140	5–8
14	November 20	Charlotte	W 101–91	Allen (22)	Allen (17)	Dinwiddie (8)	Barclays Center; 14,011	6–8
15	November 22	Sacramento	W 116–97	Dinwiddie (23)	Jordan (10)	Dinwiddie (7)	Barclays Center; 15,619	7–8
16	November 24	@ New York	W 103–101	Dinwiddie (30)	Prince (11)	Prince (5)	Madison Square Garden; 18,770	8–8
17	November 25	@ Cleveland	W 108–106	Dinwiddie (23)	Allen (21)	Dinwiddie (9)	Rocket Mortgage FieldHouse; 17,143	9–8
18	November 27	@ Boston	L 110–121	Temple (22)	Allen (14)	Dinwiddie (11)	TD Garden; 19,156	9–9
19	November 29	Boston	W 112–107	Dinwiddie (32)	Allen, Jordan (11)	Dinwiddie (11)	Barclays Center; 17,732	10–9

December: 6–7 (home: 3–3; road: 3–4)

Game	Date	Team	Score	High points	High rebounds	High assists	Location Attendance	Record
20	December 1	Miami	L 106–109	Dinwiddie (29)	Allen (12)	Prince, Temple (5)	Barclays Center; 17,026	10–10
21	December 4	@ Atlanta	W 130–118	Temple (27)	Allen (13)	Dinwiddie (5)	State Farm Arena; 15,694	11–10
22	December 6	@ Charlotte	W 111–104	Harris (22)	Jordan (13)	Dinwiddie (12)	Spectrum Center; 15,075	12–10
23	December 8	Denver	W 105–102	Dinwiddie (24)	Allen, Prince (11)	Dinwiddie (8)	Barclays Center; 16,679	13–10
24	December 11	Charlotte	L 108–113	Dinwiddie (24)	Jordan (14)	Dinwiddie (6)	Barclays Center; 15,631	13–11
25	December 14	@ Toronto	L 102–110	Dinwiddie (24)	Jordan (13)	Dinwiddie (8)	Scotiabank Arena; 19,800	13–12
26	December 15	Philadelphia	W 109–89	Dinwiddie (24)	Jordan (11)	Dinwiddie (6)	Barclays Center; 17,732	14–12
27	December 17	@ New Orleans	W 108–101 (OT)	Dinwiddie (31)	Allen (14)	Dinwiddie (7)	Smoothie King Center; 15,177	15–12
28	December 19	@ San Antonio	L 105–118	Dinwiddie (41)	Allen (13)	Allen (6)	AT&T Center; 18,354	15–13
29	December 21	Atlanta	W 122–112	Dinwiddie (39)	Jordan (20)	Dinwiddie, Jordan (6)	Barclays Center; 16,496	16–13
30	December 26	New York	L 82–94	Dinwiddie (25)	Temple (9)	Dinwiddie, Pinson (3)	Barclays Center; 17,732	16–14
31	December 28	@ Houston	L 98–108	Dinwiddie (17)	Jordan (12)	Dinwiddie (11)	Toyota Center; 18,306	16–15
32	December 30	@ Minnesota	L 115–122 (OT)	Dinwiddie (36)	Prince (14)	Dinwiddie (8)	Target Center; 15,824	16–16

January: 5–10 (home: 4–6; road: 1–4)

Game	Date	Team	Score	High points	High rebounds	High assists	Location Attendance	Record
33	January 2	@ Dallas	L 111–123	Dinwiddie (19)	Jordan (10)	Dinwiddie, Harris (5)	American Airlines Center; 20,289	16–17
34	January 4	Toronto	L 102–121	Dinwiddie (23)	Jordan (8)	Dinwiddie (7)	Barclays Center; 17,732	16–18
35	January 6	@ Orlando	L 89–101	Dinwiddie, Harris (16)	Chandler (9)	Temple (4)	Amway Center; 15,008	16–19
36	January 7	Oklahoma City	L 103–111 (OT)	Prince (21)	Jordan (10)	Dinwiddie (6)	Barclays Center; 15,677	16–20
37	January 10	Miami	W 117–113	Dinwiddie (26)	Allen (11)	Dinwiddie (14)	Barclays Center; 16,011	17–20
38	January 12	Atlanta	W 108–86	Irving (21)	Allen (12)	Dinwiddie (8)	Barclays Center; 15,201	18–20
39	January 14	Utah	L 107–118	Irving (32)	Jordan (14)	Irving (11)	Barclays Center; 15,381	18–21
40	January 15	@ Philadelphia	L 106–117	Dinwiddie (26)	Allen (10)	Dinwiddie (8)	Wells Fargo Center; 20,416	18–22
41	January 18	Milwaukee	L 97–117	Irving (17)	Allen (10)	Irving (6)	Barclays Center; 17,732	18–23
42	January 20	Philadelphia	L 111–117	Dinwiddie (22)	Allen (13)	Dinwiddie (7)	Barclays Center; 16,801	18–24
43	January 23	L.A. Lakers	L 113–128	Irving (20)	Allen (8)	Dinwiddie (13)	Barclays Center; 17,732	18–25
44	January 25	@ Detroit	W 121–111 (OT)	Irving (45)	Allen (15)	Irving (7)	Little Caesars Arena; 15,890	19–25
45	January 26	@ New York	L 97–110	Dinwiddie (23)	Allen, Claxton (5)	Dinwiddie (5)	Madison Square Garden; 17,831	19–26
46	January 29	Detroit	W 125–115	Dinwiddie (28)	Jordan (8)	Dinwiddie (6)	Barclays Center; 14,275	20–26
47	January 31	Chicago	W 133–118	Irving (54)	Jordan, Prince (8)	Dinwiddie (7)	Barclays Center; 17,732	21–26

February: 5–7 (home: 3–1; road: 2–6)

Game	Date	Team	Score	High points	High rebounds	High assists	Location Attendance	Record
48	February 1	@ Washington	L 107–113	Dinwiddie (26)	Allen (15)	Dinwiddie (6)	Capital One Arena; 18,196	21–27
49	February 3	Phoenix	W 119–97	LeVert (29)	Jordan (9)	LeVert (7)	Barclays Center; 14,891	22–27
50	February 5	Golden State	W 129–88	LeVert (23)	Allen (13)	LeVert (8)	Barclays Center; 14,352	23–27
51	February 8	@ Toronto	L 118–119	LeVert (37)	Jordan (14)	Dinwiddie (11)	Scotiabank Arena; 19,800	23–28
52	February 10	@ Indiana	W 106–105	Dinwiddie (21)	Jordan (19)	Dinwiddie (11)	Bankers Life Fieldhouse; 16,761	24–28
53	February 12	Toronto	W 101–91	LeVert (20)	Allen (13)	Dinwiddie (9)	Barclays Center; 15,823	25–28
54	February 20	@ Philadelphia	L 104–112 (OT)	LeVert (25)	Jordan (15)	Dinwiddie (8)	Wells Fargo Center; 20,806	25–29
55	February 22	@ Charlotte	W 115–86	Luwawu-Cabarrot (21)	Allen, Temple (11)	Dinwiddie (9)	Spectrum Center; 19,079	26–29
56	February 24	Orlando	L 113–115	Dinwiddie (24)	Allen (11)	Dinwiddie, LeVert (8)	Barclays Center; 16,162	26–30
57	February 26	@ Washington	L 106–110	LeVert (34)	Jordan (16)	LeVert (7)	Capital One Arena; 15,021	26–31
58	February 28	@ Atlanta	L 118–141	Dinwiddie (24)	Allen (9)	Dinwiddie (13)	State Farm Arena; 17,034	26–32
59	February 29	@ Miami	L 113–116	Dinwiddie (25)	Allen (11)	Dinwiddie (12)	American Airlines Arena; 19,600	26–33

March: 4–1 (home: 2–1; road: 2–0)

Game	Date	Team	Score	High points	High rebounds	High assists	Location Attendance	Record
60	March 3	@ Boston	W 129–120 (OT)	LeVert (51)	Jordan (15)	LeVert (5)	TD Garden; 19,156	27–33
61	March 4	Memphis	L 79–118	Prince (15)	Allen (9)	LeVert (6)	Barclays Center; 16,941	27–34
62	March 6	San Antonio	W 139–120	LeVert (27)	LeVert (11)	LeVert (10)	Barclays Center; 16,277	28–34
63	March 8	Chicago	W 110–107	Dinwiddie (24)	Jordan (15)	Dinwiddie (6)	Barclays Center; 15,916	29–34
64	March 10	@ L.A. Lakers	W 104–102	Dinwiddie (23)	Jordan (12)	Dinwiddie (7)	Staples Center; 18,997	30–34

Seeding games: 5–3 (home: 2–2; road: 3–1)

Game	Date	Team	Score	High points	High rebounds	High assists	Location Attendance	Record
65	July 31	Orlando	L 118–128	Luwawu-Cabarrot (24)	Kurucs (6)	LeVert (7)	HP Field House; No in-person attendance	30–35
66	August 2	Washington	W 118–110	LeVert (34)	Allen (15)	Chiozza (6)	HP Field House; No in-person attendance	31–35
67	August 4	@ Milwaukee	W 119–116	Luwawu-Cabarrot (26)	Hall (9)	Chiozza (10)	Visa Athletic Center; No in-person attendance	32–35
68	August 5	@ Boston	L 115–149	Martin (20)	Allen (8)	Allen, Martin (4)	The Arena; No in-person attendance	32–36
69	August 7	Sacramento	W 119–106	LeVert (22)	Allen (11)	Allen (8)	The Arena; No in-person attendance	33–36
70	August 9	@ L.A. Clippers	W 129–120	LeVert (27)	Allen (16)	LeVert (13)	The Arena; No in-person attendance	34–36
71	August 11	@ Orlando	W 108–96	Luwawu-Cabarrot, Martin (24)	Hall, Kurucs (9)	Martin, Musa (6)	The Arena; No in-person attendance	35–36
72	August 13	Portland	L 133–134	LeVert (37)	Allen (11)	LeVert (9)	The Arena; No in-person attendance	35–37

Cancelled games

Game	Date	Team	Score	High points	High rebounds	High assists	Location Attendance	Record
65	March 12	@ Golden State					Chase Center	
66	March 13	@ L.A. Clippers					Staples Center	
67	March 15	@ Sacramento					Golden 1 Center	
68	March 18	Washington					Barclays Center	
69	March 21	Boston					Barclays Center	
70	March 23	Orlando					Barclays Center	
71	March 25	L.A. Clippers					Barclays Center	
72	March 27	@ Orlando					Amway Center	
73	March 28	Cleveland					Barclays Center	
74	March 30	Portland					Barclays Center	
75	April 1	Detroit					Barclays Center	
76	April 3	@ Indiana					Bankers Life Fieldhouse	
77	April 5	Dallas					Barclays Center	
78	April 7	@ Oklahoma City					Chesapeake Energy Arena	
79	April 9	@ Milwaukee					Fiserv Forum	
80	April 11	@ Chicago					United Center	
81	April 13	@ Cleveland					Rocket Mortgage FieldHouse	
82	April 15	Milwaukee					Barclays Center	

2019–20 season schedule

=== Playoffs ===
2020 playoff game log
Total: 0–4 (home: 0–2; road: 0–2)
First round: 0–4 (home: 0–2; road: 0–2)

Game	Date	Team	Score	High points	High rebounds	High assists	Location Attendance	Series
1	August 17	@ Toronto	L 110–134	Luwawu-Cabarrot (26)	Allen (12)	LeVert (15)	AdventHealth Arena; No in-person attendance	0–1
2	August 19	@ Toronto	L 99–104	Temple (21)	Allen, Harris (15)	LeVert (11)	HP Field House; No in-person attendance	0–2
3	August 21	Toronto	L 92–117	Johnson (23)	Allen (17)	LeVert (6)	HP Field House; No in-person attendance	0–3
4	August 23	Toronto	L 122–150	LeVert (35)	Allen (15)	Chiozza, LeVert (6)	HP Field House; No in-person attendance	0–4

2020 playoff schedule

== Player statistics ==
Legend
GP	Games played	GS	Games started	MPG	Minutes per game
FG%	Field-goal percentage	3P%	3-point field-goal percentage	FT%	Free-throw percentage
RPG	Rebounds per game	APG	Assists per game	SPG	Steals per game
BPG	Blocks per game	PPG	Points per game

=== Regular season statistics ===
As of August 13, 2020

Brooklyn Nets statistics
Player	GP	GS	MPG	FG%	3P%	FT%	RPG	APG	SPG	BPG	PPG
Jarrett Allen	70	64	26.5	.649	.000	.633	9.6	1.6	.6	1.3	11.1
Justin Anderson	10	1	10.7	.263	.207	.500	2.1	.8	.0	.6	2.8
Wilson Chandler	35	3	21.0	.404	.306	.870	4.1	1.1	.5	.3	5.9
Chris Chiozza	18	2	15.4	.425	.357	1.000	2.1	3.1	.6	.1	6.4
Nic Claxton	15	0	12.5	.563	.143	.524	2.9	1.1	.1	.5	4.4
Jamal Crawford	1	0	6.0	.500	.500	—	.0	3.0	.0	.0	5.0
Spencer Dinwiddie	64	49	31.2	.415	.308	.778	3.5	6.8	.6	.3	20.6
Henry Ellenson	5	0	3.0	.143	.000	—	1.2	.2	.0	.0	.4
Donta Hall	5	0	17.0	.778	—	.417	4.6	.4	.4	1.0	6.6
Joe Harris	69	69	30.8	.486	.424	.719	4.3	2.1	.6	.2	14.5
Kyrie Irving	20	20	32.9	.478	.394	.922	5.2	6.4	1.4	.5	27.4
Tyler Johnson	8	4	24.3	.405	.389	1.000	3.0	3.0	.5	.1	12.0
DeAndre Jordan	56	6	22.0	.666	—	.680	10.0	1.9	.3	.9	8.3
Rodions Kurucs	47	9	14.6	.446	.367	.632	2.9	1.1	.5	.1	4.6
Caris LeVert	45	31	29.6	.425	.364	.711	4.2	4.4	1.2	.2	18.7
Timothé Luwawu-Cabarrot	47	2	18.1	.435	.388	.852	2.7	.6	.4	.1	7.8
Jeremiah Martin	9	0	11.0	.453	.278	.786	1.1	2.0	.8	.2	7.1
Džanan Musa	40	0	12.2	.372	.244	.750	2.2	1.1	.4	.0	4.8
David Nwaba	20	0	13.4	.521	.429	.667	2.3	.4	.6	.6	5.2
Theo Pinson	33	0	11.1	.290	.188	.938	1.6	1.7	.5	.1	3.6
Taurean Prince	64	61	29.0	.376	.339	.798	6.0	1.8	.9	.4	12.1
Iman Shumpert	13	0	18.5	.328	.242	.571	2.6	.9	.9	.2	4.2
Garrett Temple	62	35	27.9	.378	.329	.805	3.5	2.5	.8	.5	10.3
Lance Thomas	7	4	14.0	.308	.400	1.000	1.9	.9	.0	.0	3.4

=== Playoff statistics ===
As of August 23, 2020

Brooklyn Nets statistics
Player	GP	GS	MPG	FG%	3P%	FT%	RPG	APG	SPG	BPG	PPG
Jarrett Allen	4	4	33.0	.583	—	.813	14.8	2.3	.5	1.8	10.3
Justin Anderson	3	0	9.3	.417	.455	1.000	2.7	1.0	.0	.3	6.3
Chris Chiozza	4	0	16.3	.333	.313	.500	1.5	4.3	1.3	.0	5.8
Donta Hall	3	0	6.7	.600	—	.250	1.7	.0	.0	.7	2.3
Joe Harris	2	2	36.0	.522	.583	.500	10.0	1.0	.5	.0	16.5
Tyler Johnson	4	2	23.3	.457	.393	1.000	1.8	2.3	.0	.3	13.8
Rodions Kurucs	4	1	14.5	.550	.000	.000	3.3	.8	.3	.5	5.5
Caris LeVert	4	4	35.0	.370	.429	.720	6.0	9.5	1.3	.3	20.3
Timothé Luwawu-Cabarrot	4	3	32.8	.339	.333	.917	3.8	1.5	.8	.0	16.0
Jeremiah Martin	3	0	9.0	.286	.600	1.000	1.0	1.3	.0	.3	4.0
Džanan Musa	3	0	13.0	.182	.000	.714	1.0	1.3	.0	.3	4.7
Garrett Temple	4	4	34.3	.347	.250	.833	2.8	2.0	.8	.3	12.0
Lance Thomas	3	0	5.7	.200	.000	.500	1.0	.0	.0	.3	1.3

== Transactions ==
=== Trades ===
June 20, 2019	To Brooklyn Nets Draft rights to Jaylen Hands; 2020 first-round pick	To Los Angeles Clippers Draft rights to Mfiondu Kabengele
July 6, 2019	To Brooklyn Nets Taurean Prince; 2021 second-round pick	To Atlanta Hawks Allen Crabbe; Draft rights to Nickeil Alexander-Walker; 2020 protected first-round pick
July 6, 2019	To Brooklyn Nets Draft rights to Nemanja Dangubić; Draft rights to Aaron White	To San Antonio Spurs DeMarre Carroll
July 6, 2019	To Washington Wizards Dāvis Bertāns	
July 7, 2019	To Brooklyn Nets Kevin Durant; 2020 protected first-round pick	To Golden State Warriors Treveon Graham; Shabazz Napier; D'Angelo Russell

=== Additions ===
Date	Player	Former team	Ref
July 6, 2019	Kyrie Irving	Boston Celtics	
July 6, 2019	DeAndre Jordan	New York Knicks	
July 8, 2019	Wilson Chandler	Los Angeles Clippers	
July 8, 2019	Garrett Temple	Los Angeles Clippers	
July 17, 2019	Henry Ellenson	New York Knicks	
July 17, 2019	David Nwaba	Cleveland Cavaliers	
July 30, 2019	Deng Adel	Cleveland Cavaliers	
September 25, 2019	John Egbunu	Florida Gators	
September 25, 2019	C. J. Williams	Minnesota Timberwolves	
September 27, 2019	Lance Thomas	New York Knicks	
October 15, 2019	Devin Cannady	Princeton Tigers	
October 15, 2019	C. J. Massinburg	Buffalo Bulls	
October 23, 2019	Timothé Luwawu-Cabarrot	Chicago Bulls	
November 13, 2019	Iman Shumpert	Houston Rockets	
January 4, 2020	Chris Chiozza	Capital City Go-Go	
January 6, 2020	Justin Anderson	Raptors 905	
January 15, 2020	Timothé Luwawu-Cabarrot	—	
January 16, 2020	Jeremiah Martin	Sioux Falls Skyforce	
June 24, 2020	Tyler Johnson	Phoenix Suns	
July 9, 2020	Michael Beasley	Guangdong Southern Tigers	
July 9, 2020	Jamal Crawford	Phoenix Suns	
July 10, 2020	Donta Hall	Detroit Pistons	
July 14, 2020	Lance Thomas	—	
July 18, 2020	Justin Anderson	Long Island Nets	

=== Subtractions ===
Date	Player	New team	Ref
July 5, 2019	Alan Williams	Shaanxi Xinda	
July 7, 2019	Jared Dudley	Los Angeles Lakers	
July 18, 2019	Rondae Hollis-Jefferson	Toronto Raptors	
July 20, 2019	Ed Davis	Utah Jazz	
October 14, 2019	Deng Adel	Long Island Nets	
October 14, 2019	John Egbunu	Long Island Nets	
October 18, 2019	Devin Cannady	Long Island Nets	
October 18, 2019	C. J. Massinburg	Long Island Nets	
October 18, 2019	Lance Thomas	Brooklyn Nets	
October 18, 2019	C. J. Williams	Long Island Nets	
December 12, 2019	Iman Shumpert	Brooklyn Nets	
January 3, 2020	Henry Ellenson	Raptors 905	
January 3, 2020	David Nwaba	Houston Rockets	
January 15, 2020	Justin Anderson	Raptors 905	
June 23, 2020	Theo Pinson	New York Knicks	
