= Josh Richardson =

American basketball player (born 1993)

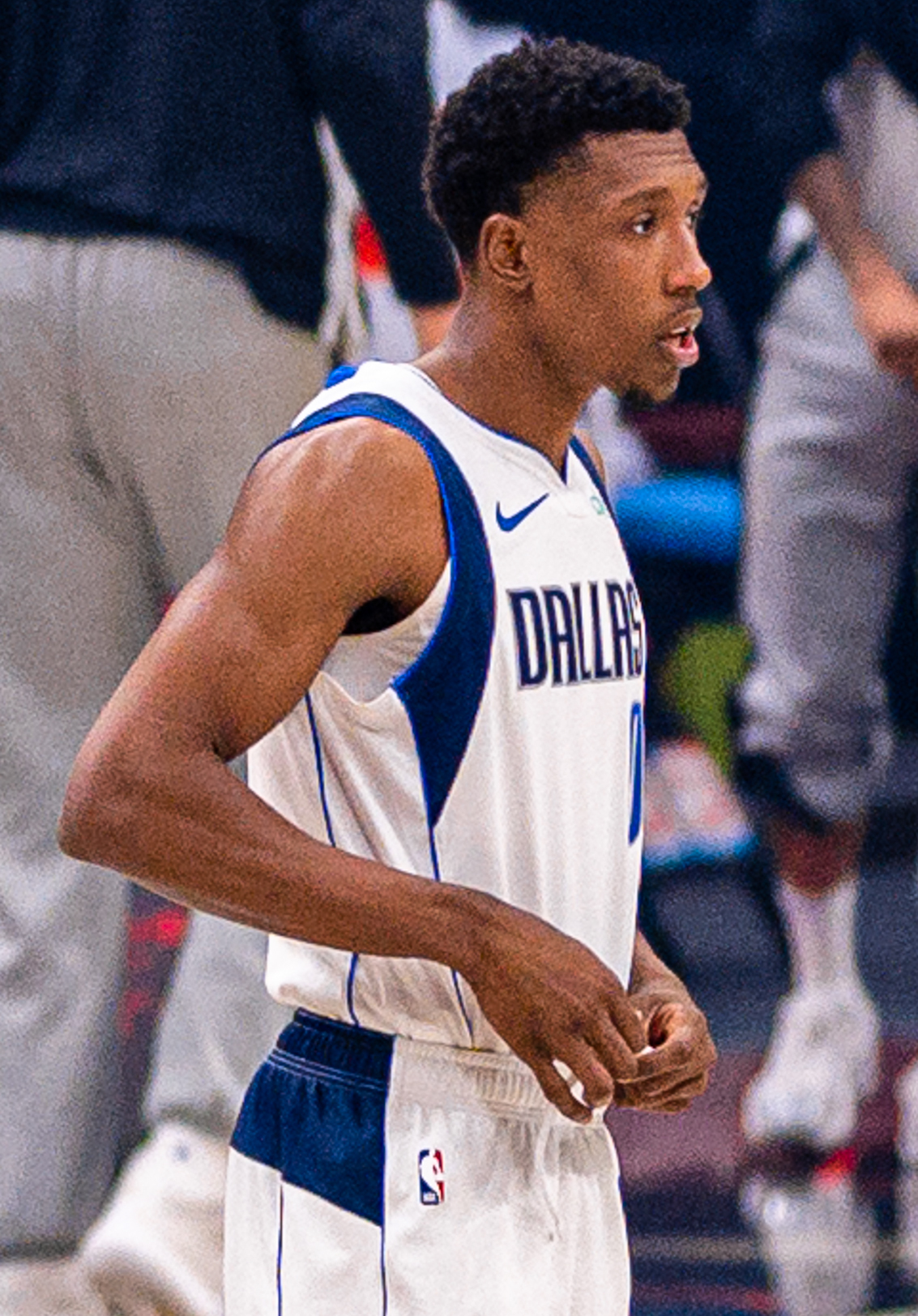
- Richardson with the Dallas Mavericks in 2021

Personal information
- Born: September 15, 1993 (age 33) Edmond, Oklahoma, U.S.
- Listed height: 6 ft 5 in (1.96 m)
- Listed weight: 200 lb (91 kg)

Career information
- High school: Santa Fe (Edmond, Oklahoma)
- College: Tennessee (2011–2015)
- NBA draft: 2015: 2nd round, 40th overall pick
- Drafted by: Miami Heat
- Playing career: 2015–2026
- Position: Shooting guard / small forward
- Number: 0, 8, 7, 2, 11

Career history
- 2015–2019: Miami Heat
- 2015–2016: →Sioux Falls Skyforce
- 2019–2020: Philadelphia 76ers
- 2020–2021: Dallas Mavericks
- 2021–2022: Boston Celtics
- 2022–2023: San Antonio Spurs
- 2023: New Orleans Pelicans
- 2023–2025: Miami Heat
- 2026: Basket Zaragoza

Career highlights
- First-team All-SEC (2015); 2× SEC All-Defensive Team (2014, 2015)

Career statistics
- Points: 6,381 (11.5 ppg)
- Rebounds: 1,685 (3.0 rpg)
- Assists: 566 (2.6 apg)
- Stats at NBA.com
- Stats at Basketball Reference

Joshua Michael Richardson (born September 15, 1993) is an American former professional basketball player, who played ten seasons in the National Basketball Association (NBA). He played college basketball for the Tennessee Volunteers, earning first-team all-conference honors in the Southeastern Conference (SEC) as a senior in 2015. He was selected in the second round of the 2015 NBA draft by the Miami Heat and spent the majority of his career there, but has also played for the Philadelphia 76ers, Dallas Mavericks, Boston Celtics, San Antonio Spurs, and New Orleans Pelicans.

== High school career ==
Richardson averaged 16.5 points, 6.2 rebounds and 3.6 assists as a point guard in his senior year at Santa Fe High School in Edmond, Oklahoma. That year, he was named to the Oklahoma Coaches Association "Large West" All-State Team and The Oklahoman's Super 5 first team.

College recruiting
Name	Hometown	School	Height	Weight	Commit date
Josh Richardson; SG	Edmond, OK	Santa Fe High School	6 ft 5 in (1.96 m)	180 lb (82 kg)	Apr 17, 2011
Josh Richardson; SG	Recruit ratings: Scout: Rivals: (90)				

== College career ==
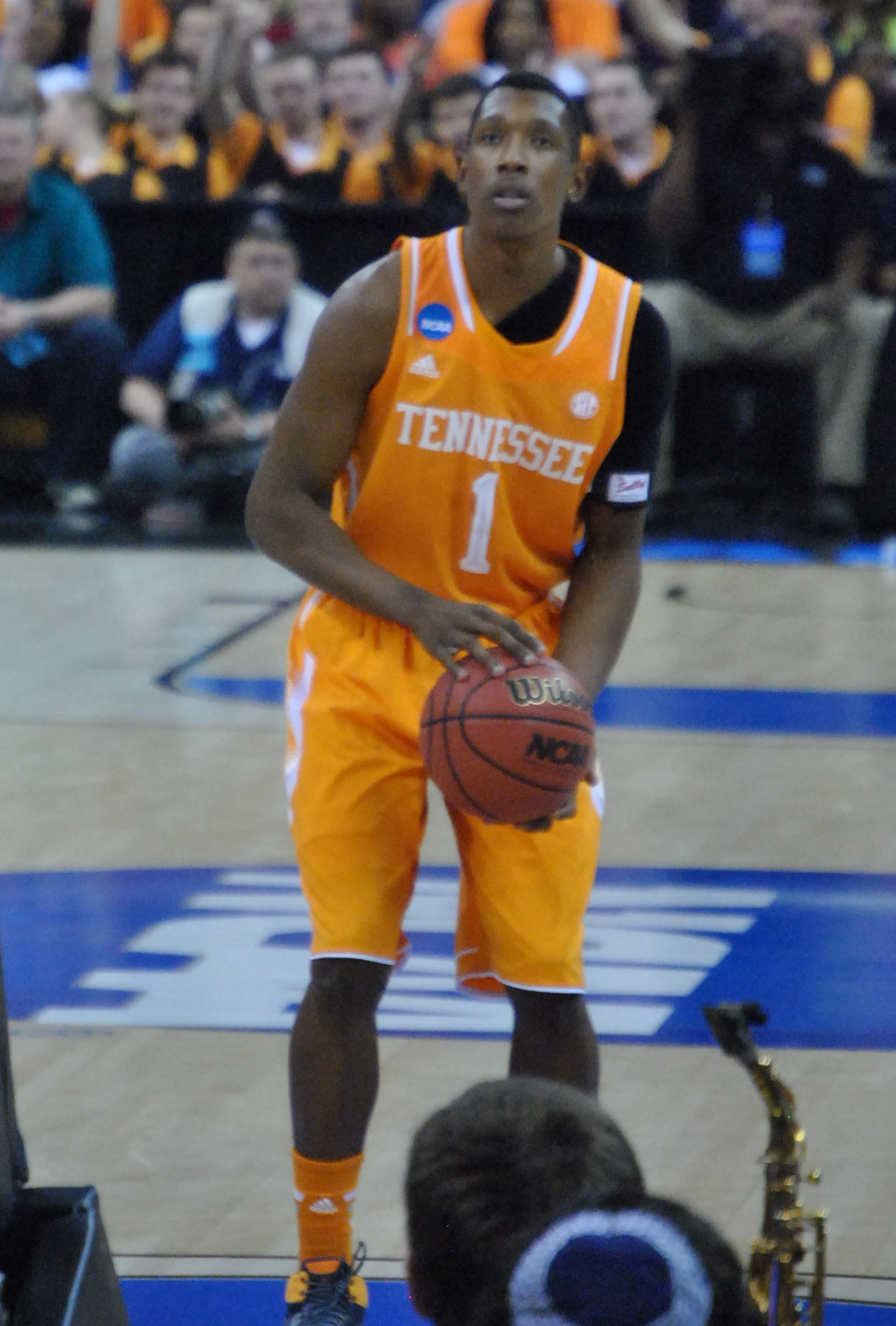
Richardson at the free throw line for the Volunteers

Richardson played all four seasons at University of Tennessee, appearing in 136 career games for the Volunteers and averaged 9.2 points, 3.2 rebounds, 1.8 assists, 1.08 steals and 28.2 minutes while shooting 45.6 percent from the field, 31.8 percent from three-point range and 75.8 percent from the foul line. He finished his career ranking third in school history in games played, ninth in minutes (3,802), ninth in starts, 10th in steals (147), 16th in blocks (88) and 28th in points (1,252).

As a junior with the Volunteers, he averaged 10.3 points and 2.8 rebounds per game. In his senior season, Richardson averaged 16.0 points and 4.5 rebounds per game and was named to the First Team All SEC, the SEC All-Defensive Team and the Defensive All-American Team.

== Professional career ==
=== Miami Heat (2015–2019) ===
On June 25, 2015, Richardson was selected with the 40th pick of the 2015 NBA draft by the Miami Heat. On August 3, 2015, he signed with the Heat after averaging 11.8 points and 2.8 rebounds in 10 summer league games. He failed to appear in the Heat's first four games of the season before making his NBA debut on November 5 against the Minnesota Timberwolves, playing in just under seven minutes of action. On November 12, in just his third NBA game, Richardson started at shooting guard in place of the absent Dwyane Wade. He subsequently recorded eight points and three rebounds in 20 minutes of action, as the Heat defeated the Utah Jazz 92–91. On December 30, he was assigned to the Sioux Falls Skyforce, the Heat's D-League affiliate. He was recalled by the Heat on January 3, reassigned on January 5, and recalled again on January 11. On February 24, he recorded his first double-digit game in the NBA, scoring 15 points on 5-of-6 shooting off the bench in a 118–111 loss to the Golden State Warriors. On March 11, he scored a career-high 22 points in a 118–96 win over the Chicago Bulls. On April 5, he was named Eastern Conference Rookie of the Month for March, becoming just the third player in Heat franchise history to win the monthly rookie award; the other two being Caron Butler (four-time recipient in 2002–03) and Michael Beasley (April 2009).

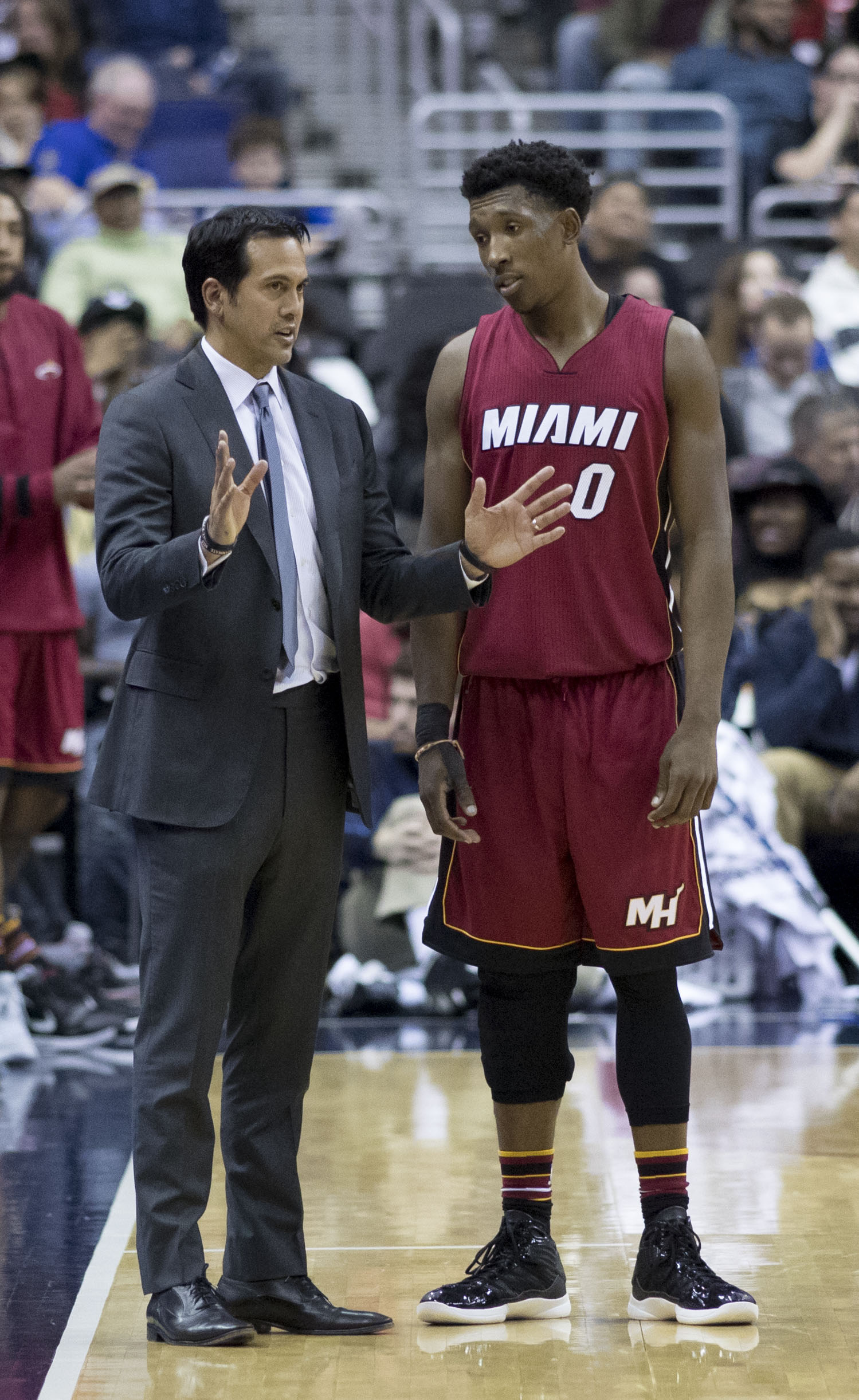
Richardson listening to Heat head coach Erik Spoelstra during a game in 2016

In July 2016, Richardson re-joined the Heat for the 2016 NBA Summer League. On September 9, 2016, he sustained a partially torn medial collateral ligament in his right knee, that sidelined him for six to eight weeks. On December 27, 2016, he tied a career high with 22 points in a 106–94 loss to the Oklahoma City Thunder.

On September 18, 2017, Richardson signed a four-year, $42 million contract extension with the Heat. On December 1, 2017, he scored a career-high 27 points in a 105–100 win over the Charlotte Hornets. On December 16, 2017, he set a new career high with 28 points in a 90–85 win over the Los Angeles Clippers. On February 7, 2018, he had a 30-point effort in a 109–101 loss to the Houston Rockets.

On October 29, he scored a career-high 31 points in a 123–113 loss to the Sacramento Kings. On November 3, he set a new career high with 32 points in a 123–118 loss to the Atlanta Hawks. On February 10, 2019, he scored a career-high 37 points and made eight 3-pointers in a 120–118 loss to the Golden State Warriors. He missed games at the end of the season with heel and groin injuries. Richardson's per-game averages of 16.6 points and 4.1 assists were the highest of his NBA career.

=== Philadelphia 76ers (2019–2020) ===
On July 6, 2019, Miami traded Richardson to the Philadelphia 76ers as part of a package for Jimmy Butler. On December 12, Richardson scored 14 points in a 115–109 win against the Boston Celtics. Coach Brett Brown called him a "dot connector" and "bridge builder".

=== Dallas Mavericks (2020–2021) ===
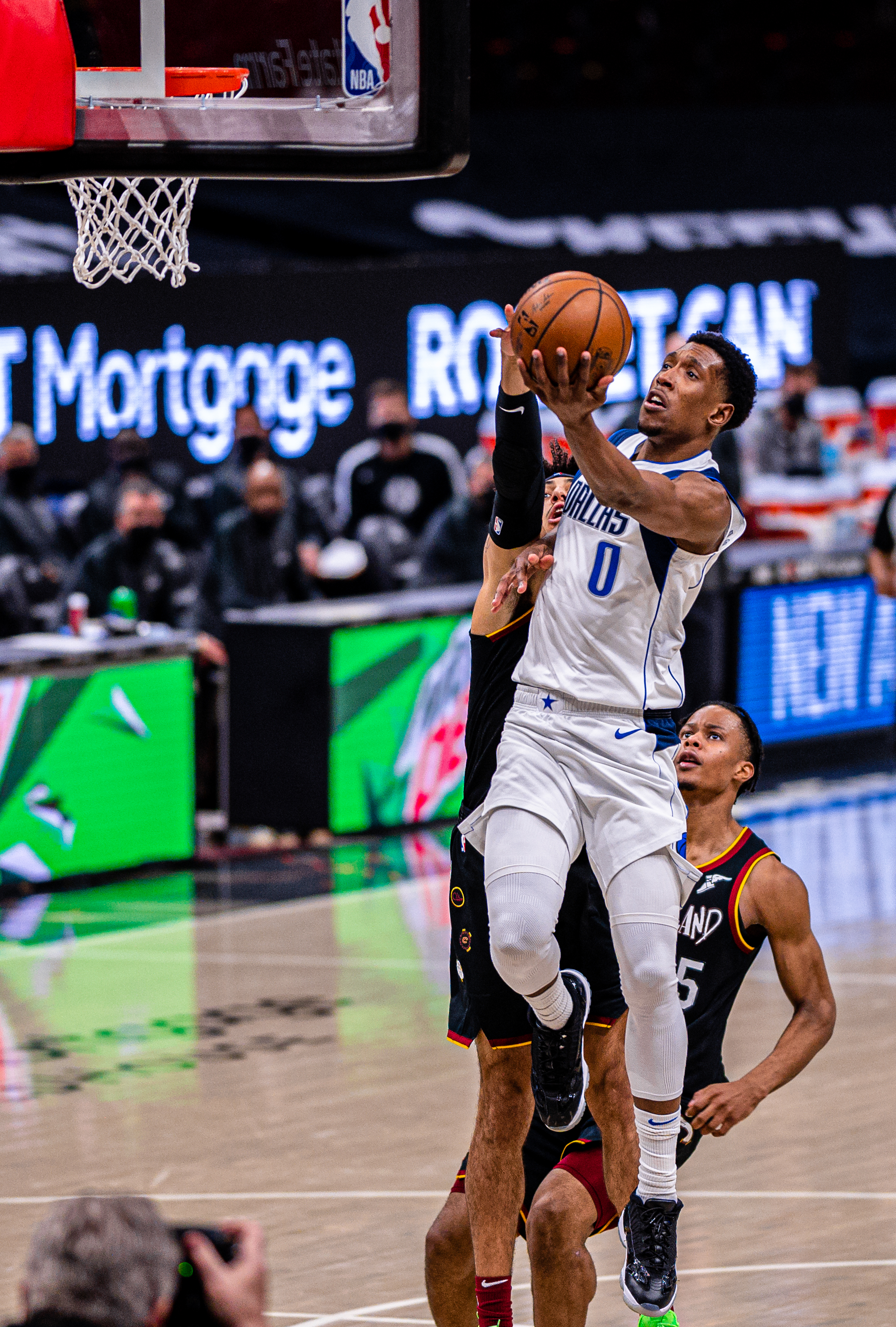
Richardson takes a layup with the Dallas Mavericks during a game against the Cleveland Cavaliers in 2021

On November 18, 2020, Richardson, along with the draft rights to Tyler Bey, were traded to the Dallas Mavericks in exchange for Seth Curry. His season was characterized by Sports Illustrated as "disappointing" as Richardson's production dropped significantly in the playoffs. In 7 games against the Los Angeles Clippers, he scored only 4.9 points, 1.6 rebounds, and 0.7 assists in 13.4 minutes per game.

=== Boston Celtics (2021–2022) ===
On July 31, 2021, Richardson was acquired by the Boston Celtics using the remainder of the Gordon Hayward traded player exception in exchange for young center Moses Brown. On August 24, the Celtics announced that they had signed Richardson to a contract extension. He had a 27-point outing in a win against the New York Knicks.

=== San Antonio Spurs (2022–2023) ===
On February 10, 2022, Richardson was traded along with Romeo Langford to the San Antonio Spurs in exchange for Derrick White.

=== New Orleans Pelicans (2023) ===
On February 9, 2023, Richardson was traded to the New Orleans Pelicans in exchange for Devonte' Graham and four future second-round picks.

=== Return to Miami (2023–2025) ===
On July 2, 2023, Richardson signed with the Miami Heat.

On February 6, 2025, Richardson was traded to the Utah Jazz in a five-team trade, including Jimmy Butler to the Golden State Warriors, but was waived shortly after.

=== Basket Zaragoza (2026) ===
On January 23, 2026, Richardson signed with Basket Zaragoza of the Spanish Liga ACB and Europe Cup. Richardson signed a contract until the end of the season with an initial 10-day trial period, ultimately averaging 9.6 across five appearances for the team. On February 27, Richardson and Zaragoza reached an agreement to put an end to his contract.

On July 30, 2026, Richardson announced his retirement from professional basketball.

== Career statistics ==
Legend
GP	Games played	GS	Games started	MPG	Minutes per game
FG%	Field goal percentage	3P%	3-point field goal percentage	FT%	Free throw percentage
RPG	Rebounds per game	APG	Assists per game	SPG	Steals per game
BPG	Blocks per game	PPG	Points per game	**Bold**	Career high

=== NBA ===
==== Regular season ====
Year	Team	GP	GS	MPG	FG%	3P%	FT%	RPG	APG	SPG	BPG	PPG
2015–16	Miami	52	2	21.3	**.452**	**.461**	.667	2.1	1.4	.7	.5	6.6
2016–17	Miami	53	34	30.5	.394	.330	.779	3.2	2.6	1.1	.7	10.2
2017–18	Miami	**81**	**81**	33.2	.451	.378	.845	3.5	2.9	**1.5**	**.9**	12.9
2018–19	Miami	73	73	**34.8**	.412	.357	.861	**3.6**	**4.1**	1.1	.5	**16.6**
2019–20	Philadelphia	55	53	30.8	.430	.341	.809	3.2	2.9	.9	.7	13.7
2020–21	Dallas	59	56	30.3	.427	.330	.917	3.3	2.6	1.0	.4	12.1
2021–22	Boston	44	0	24.7	.443	.397	.859	2.8	1.5	.8	.5	9.7
2021–22	San Antonio	21	7	24.4	.429	.444	.946	2.9	2.3	1.0	.3	11.4
2022–23	San Antonio	42	6	23.7	.436	.357	.883	2.8	3.3	1.0	.3	11.5
2022–23	New Orleans	23	4	23.2	.419	.384	.762	2.4	1.6	1.3	.4	7.5
2023–24	Miami	43	6	25.6	.444	.347	.944	2.8	2.4	.6	.3	9.9
2024–25	Miami	8	0	18.7	.289	.273	**1.000**	1.5	1.5	1.0	.1	4.0
Career		554	322	28.5	.428	.363	.846	3.0	2.6	1.0	.5	11.5

==== Playoffs ====
Year	Team	GP	GS	MPG	FG%	3P%	FT%	RPG	APG	SPG	BPG	PPG
2016	Miami	**14**	0	27.6	.371	**.370**	.714	3.6	1.6	.4	.9	6.6
2018	Miami	5	**5**	26.0	.375	.316	.857	3.0	2.8	**2.2**	**1.0**	8.4
2020	Philadelphia	4	4	**36.0**	.357	.357	.944	**3.8**	**3.3**	.5	.5	**16.8**
2021	Dallas	7	0	13.4	**.393**	.300	**1.000**	1.6	.7	.3	.0	4.9
Career		30	9	25.2	.371	.350	.875	3.0	1.8	.7	.7	7.9

=== College ===
Year	Team	GP	GS	MPG	FG%	3P%	FT%	RPG	APG	SPG	BPG	PPG
2011–12	Tennessee	34	9	16.0	.353	.237	.640	1.4	.7	.5	.6	2.9
2012–13	Tennessee	33	33	30.7	.469	.214	.692	4.3	1.5	1.1	.7	7.9
2013–14	Tennessee	**37**	**36**	30.4	**.474**	.340	.793	2.9	1.5	.7	**.8**	10.3
2014–15	Tennessee	32	32	**36.3**	.461	**.359**	**.798**	**4.5**	**3.6**	**2.1**	.5	**16.0**
Career		136	110	28.3	.456	.318	.758	3.2	1.8	1.1	.6	9.2

== Personal life ==
Richardson's father, Mike, is a retired Oklahoma City firefighter, and his mother, Alice, is an ordained Baptist minister and retired lieutenant colonel in the United States Air Force Reserve. His older sister, Alex, played college basketball for the Oklahoma State Cowgirls. Richardson received his degree in Psychology in May 2015, and enjoys playing classical piano. He is a fan of Arsenal F.C.
