= Garrett Temple =

American basketball player and coach (born 1986)

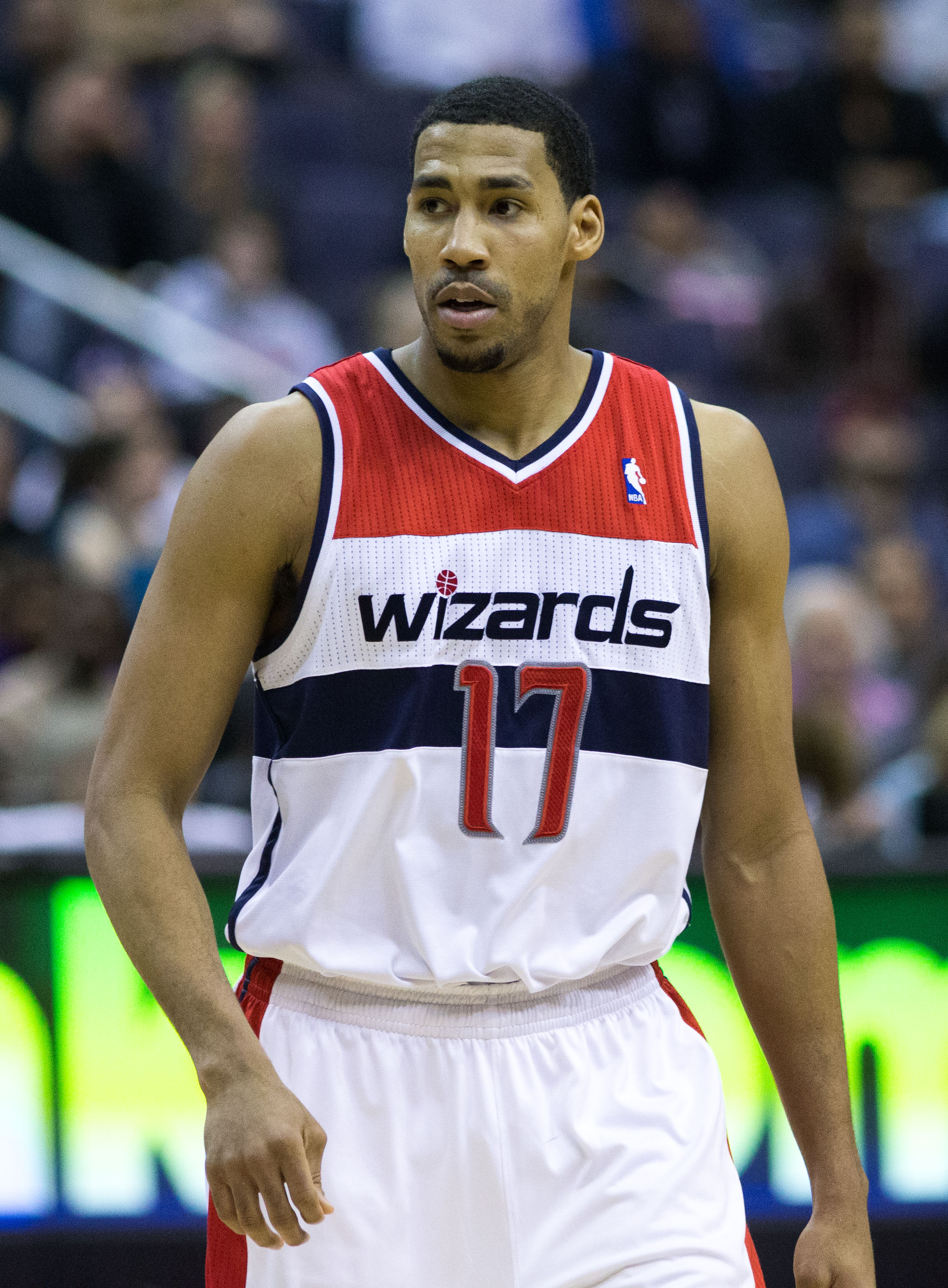
- Temple with the Washington Wizards in 2013

Dallas Mavericks
- Title: Assistant coach
- League: NBA

Personal information
- Born: May 8, 1986 (age 40) Baton Rouge, Louisiana, U.S.
- Listed height: 6 ft 5 in (1.96 m)
- Listed weight: 195 lb (88 kg)

Career information
- High school: LSU Laboratory School (Baton Rouge, Louisiana)
- College: LSU (2005–2009)
- NBA draft: 2009: undrafted
- Playing career: 2009–2026
- Position: Shooting guard / small forward
- Number: 2, 14, 17, 41
- Coaching career: 2026–present

Career history

Playing
- 2009–2010: Rio Grande Valley Vipers
- 2010: Houston Rockets
- 2010: Sacramento Kings
- 2010: San Antonio Spurs
- 2010: Rio Grande Valley Vipers
- 2010–2011: Erie BayHawks
- 2011: Milwaukee Bucks
- 2011: Erie BayHawks
- 2011: Charlotte Bobcats
- 2011–2012: Casale Monferrato
- 2012: Reno Bighorns
- 2012–2016: Washington Wizards
- 2016–2018: Sacramento Kings
- 2018–2019: Memphis Grizzlies
- 2019: Los Angeles Clippers
- 2019–2020: Brooklyn Nets
- 2020–2021: Chicago Bulls
- 2021–2023: New Orleans Pelicans
- 2023–2026: Toronto Raptors

Coaching
- 2026–present: Dallas Mavericks (assistant)

Career highlights
- NBA D-League All-Star (2011); Second-team All-SEC (2009); SEC All-Defensive Team (2009)

Career statistics
- Points: 4,599 (5.8 ppg)
- Rebounds: 1,720 (2.2 rpg)
- Assists: 1,269 (1.6 apg)
- Stats at NBA.com
- Stats at Basketball Reference

Garrett Bartholomew Temple (born May 8, 1986) is an American professional basketball coach and former player who currently serves as an assistant coach for the Dallas Mavericks of the National Basketball Association (NBA). He played college basketball for the LSU Tigers before playing professionally for 12 different teams across 17 seasons in the NBA.

== High school career ==
Temple attended LSU Laboratory School in Baton Rouge, Louisiana. As a senior, he averaged 13.9 points, 7.4 rebounds and 5.5 assists in leading University High to the 2004 Class 2A state championship.

At University High, Temple also competed in track and field, where he was a long jump and triple jump specialist.

== College career ==
After redshirting the 2004–05 season at Louisiana State University to work on his game, Temple earned a reputation as a defensive stopper as a freshman in 2005–06. In 36 games (35 starts), he averaged 5.1 points, 2.6 rebounds, 2.8 assists and 1.1 steals in 33.3 minutes per game.

In his sophomore season, he finished the year with 138 assists and 83 turnovers, a 1.7 assist-to-turnover ratio, which was 10th best in the SEC. In May 2007, he was part of the Reach USA Tour of China, an all-star team of players that went 6–2 against two Chinese league teams. In 32 games (all starts), he averaged 8.6 points, 3.7 rebounds, 4.3 assists and 1.6 steals per game.

In his junior season, he played a team-high 1,066 minutes and ranked 11th in the league in assist average. In 31 games, he averaged 6.4 points, 4.2 rebounds, 3.6 assists and 1.3 steals per game.

In his senior season, he became LSU's all-time leader in minutes played (4,432), breaking a record set by Howard Carter in 1983. He earned All-SEC Defensive team honors, as well as being named to the coaches' All-SEC second team. In 35 games, he averaged 7.1 points, 4.5 rebounds, 3.8 assists and 1.7 steals per game.

== Professional career ==
=== Rio Grande Valley Vipers (2009–2010) ===
After going undrafted in the 2009 NBA draft, Temple joined the Houston Rockets for the 2009 NBA Summer League. In September 2009, he signed with the Rockets. However, he was later waived by the Rockets on October 21, 2009. In November 2009, he was acquired by the Rio Grande Valley Vipers as an affiliate player.

=== Houston Rockets (2010) ===
On February 8, 2010, Temple signed a 10-day contract with the Rockets. On February 20, 2010, he signed a second 10-day contract with the Rockets.

=== Sacramento Kings (2010) ===
On March 3, 2010, Temple signed a 10-day contract with the Sacramento Kings.

=== San Antonio Spurs (2010) ===
On March 13, 2010, Temple signed a 10-day contract with the San Antonio Spurs. On March 23, 2010, he signed with the Spurs for the rest of the season.

In July 2010, Temple joined the San Antonio Spurs for the 2010 NBA Summer League. On November 11, 2010, he was waived by the Spurs.

=== Return to the Vipers (2010) ===
On November 30, 2010, Temple was re-acquired by the Rio Grande Valley Vipers.

=== Erie BayHawks (2010–2011) ===
On December 30, 2010, Temple was traded to the Erie BayHawks in exchange for Jeff Adrien.

=== Milwaukee Bucks (2011) ===
On January 25, 2011, Temple signed a 10-day contract with the Milwaukee Bucks. On February 5, 2011, he signed a second 10-day contract with the Bucks.

=== Return to the BayHawks (2011) ===
On February 17, 2011, Temple returned to the BayHawks.

=== Charlotte Bobcats (2011) ===
On March 7, 2011, Temple signed a 10-day contract with the Charlotte Bobcats. On March 17, 2011, he signed a second 10-day contract with the Bobcats. On March 28, 2011, he signed with the Bobcats for the rest of the season.

=== Casale Monferrato (2011–2012) ===
On July 27, 2011, Temple signed a one-year deal with Novipiù Casale Monferrato of Italy. In 28 games, he averaged 9.5 points, 2.8 rebounds, 1.4 assists and 1.5 steals per game as Casale finished last on the ladder in 2011–12 with an 8–24 record.

=== Reno Bighorns (2012) ===
In July 2012, Temple joined the Oklahoma City Thunder for the Orlando Summer League and the Cleveland Cavaliers for the Las Vegas Summer League.

On September 13, 2012, Temple signed with the Miami Heat. He was later waived by the Heat on October 27, 2012. On November 1, 2012, he was re-acquired by the Erie BayHawks. Four days later, he was traded to the Reno Bighorns.

=== Washington Wizards (2012–2016) ===
On December 25, 2012, Temple signed with the Washington Wizards.

On July 10, 2013, Temple re-signed with the Wizards. On July 18, 2014, he again re-signed with the Wizards to a two-year, $2 million deal. On November 1, 2014, he scored a then-career-high 18 points in a 108–97 win over the Milwaukee Bucks.

On June 15, 2015, Temple exercised his player option with the Wizards for the 2015–16 season. On November 14, he matched his career high of 18 points in a 108–99 win over the Orlando Magic. On December 19, he set a new career high with 21 points in a 109–101 win over the Charlotte Hornets. On December 21, he topped that mark with 23 points in a 113–99 win over the Sacramento Kings. Two days later, he had another strong performance for the Wizards with 20 points against the Memphis Grizzlies, becoming the first NBA player to score at least 20 in three straight games after not reaching that level for his first 250 contests.

=== Second stint with Sacramento (2016–2018) ===
On July 9, 2016, Temple signed a three-year, $24 million contract with the Sacramento Kings for a second stint. He made his debut for the Kings in their season opener on October 26, scoring 12 points in just under 18 minutes off the bench in a 113–94 win over the Phoenix Suns. On November 5, Temple scored a team-high 19 points off the bench and tied his career high with five three-pointers in a 117–91 loss to the Milwaukee Bucks. On February 1, 2017, he was ruled out for two to three weeks after an MRI revealed a partial tear of his left biceps femoris muscle.

On January 23, 2018, Temple scored 19 of his career-high 34 points in the final quarter to lift the Kings to a 105–99 win over the Orlando Magic.

=== Memphis Grizzlies (2018–2019) ===
On July 17, 2018, Temple was traded to the Memphis Grizzlies in exchange for Deyonta Davis, Ben McLemore, a 2021 second-round pick and cash considerations. On October 19, 2018, he scored a game-high 30 points in a 131–117 win over the Atlanta Hawks. On January 26, 2019, he was ruled out for one to two weeks with a mild strain in his left shoulder.

=== Los Angeles Clippers (2019) ===
On February 7, 2019, Temple and JaMychal Green were traded by the Grizzlies to the Los Angeles Clippers in exchange for Avery Bradley.

=== Brooklyn Nets (2019–2020) ===
On July 8, 2019, Temple signed a two-year, $9.7 million contract with the Brooklyn Nets.

=== Chicago Bulls (2020–2021) ===
On November 27, 2020, Temple signed a one-year, $4.8 million contract with the Chicago Bulls.

=== New Orleans Pelicans (2021–2023) ===
On August 8, 2021, Temple signed a three-year, $15.5 million contract with his hometown team, the New Orleans Pelicans via a sign-and-trade. On July 5, 2023, Temple was waived by the Pelicans.

=== Toronto Raptors (2023–2026) ===
On August 1, 2023, Temple signed with the Toronto Raptors. He made 27 appearances (two starts) for Toronto during the 2023–24 NBA season, averaging 3.3 points, 1.7 rebounds, and 1.0 assist.

On July 6, 2024, Temple re-signed with the Raptors. He made 28 appearances for the team during the 2024–25 NBA season, averaging 1.9 points, 1.0 rebounds, and 1.1 assists.

On July 2, 2025, Temple re-signed with the Raptors for another season.

== Coaching career ==
=== Dallas Mavericks (2026–present) ===
On July 4, 2026, Temple was named an assistant coach for the Dallas Mavericks under the new coach Dusty May, shortly after announcing his retirement as an active player.

== NBA career statistics ==
Legend
GP	Games played	GS	Games started	MPG	Minutes per game
FG%	Field goal percentage	3P%	3-point field goal percentage	FT%	Free throw percentage
RPG	Rebounds per game	APG	Assists per game	SPG	Steals per game
BPG	Blocks per game	PPG	Points per game	**Bold**	Career high

=== Regular season ===
Year	Team	GP	GS	MPG	FG%	3P%	FT%	RPG	APG	SPG	BPG	PPG
2009–10	Houston	9	0	13.1	**.448**	.250	.667	1.6	.8	.4	.4	5.0
2009–10	Sacramento	5	0	4.6	.375	.000	**1.000**	.6	.4	.2	.0	2.2
2009–10	San Antonio	13	4	14.9	.438	**.435**	.667	1.1	.9	.6	.2	6.2
2010–11	San Antonio	3	0	6.8	.200	.000	.000	.7	.7	.3	.3	.7
2010–11	Milwaukee	9	0	9.3	.333	.300	.000	.7	.7	.1	.1	1.9
2010–11	Charlotte	12	0	10.5	.286	.269	.636	1.3	2.0	.8	.3	3.2
2012–13	Washington	51	36	22.7	.407	.325	.703	2.4	2.3	1.0	.3	5.1
2013–14	Washington	75	0	8.5	.362	.207	.698	.9	1.0	.5	.1	1.8
2014–15	Washington	52	18	14.1	.400	.375	.729	1.7	1.1	.8	.2	3.9
2015–16	Washington	**80**	43	24.4	.398	.345	.728	2.7	1.8	.9	.2	7.3
2016–17	Sacramento	65	20	26.6	.424	.373	.784	2.8	**2.6**	**1.3**	.4	7.8
2017–18	Sacramento	65	35	24.8	.418	.392	.769	2.3	1.9	.9	.4	8.4
2018–19	Memphis	49	**49**	**31.2**	.429	.352	.750	3.1	1.4	1.0	**.5**	9.4
2018–19	L.A. Clippers	26	6	19.6	.396	.296	.742	2.5	1.4	1.0	.2	4.7
2019–20	Brooklyn	62	35	27.9	.378	.329	.805	**3.5**	2.5	.8	**.5**	**10.3**
2020–21	Chicago	56	25	27.3	.415	.335	.800	2.9	2.2	.8	**.5**	7.6
2021–22	New Orleans	59	16	18.6	.376	.319	.683	2.4	1.3	.7	.4	5.2
2022–23	New Orleans	25	0	6.5	.400	.423	.750	.7	.5	.4	.1	2.0
2023–24	Toronto	27	2	10.7	.372	.300	.818	1.7	1.0	.4	.1	3.3
2024–25	Toronto	28	0	8.1	.300	.214	.917	1.0	1.1	.6	.1	1.9
2025–26	Toronto	22	0	3.3	.267	.250	.667	.4	.4	.2	.1	.8
Career		793	289	19.6	.399	.342	.744	2.2	1.6	.8	.3	5.8

=== Playoffs ===
Year	Team	GP	GS	MPG	FG%	3P%	FT%	RPG	APG	SPG	BPG	PPG
2010	San Antonio	6	0	2.5	.333	.333	**1.000**	.3	**.3**	.2	.0	.7
2014	Washington	**10**	0	.9	**1.000**	**1.000**	–	.0	.0	.0	.0	.5
2015	Washington	4	0	6.5	.167	.000	.625	**.8**	**.3**	**.5**	.0	1.8
2019	L.A. Clippers	6	0	10.5	.273	.143	.700	1.2	.3	.5	.2	2.3
2020	Brooklyn	4	**4**	**34.3**	.347	.250	.833	**2.8**	**2.0**	**.8**	**.3**	**12.0**
2022	New Orleans	1	0	2.0	—	—	—	1.0	.0	.0	.0	.0
2026	Toronto	2	0	1.0	.000	—	—	.0	.5	.0	.0	.0
Career		33	4	7.7	.333	.240	.720	.7	.4	.3	.1	2.4

== Personal life ==
Temple is the son of Collis Temple and Soundra Johnson Temple. Collis was the first African American to play basketball at LSU (1971–1974). He has a younger sister, Colleen Noelle, and two older brothers, Collis III (who played at LSU from 1999 to 2003) and Elliott.

Temple is a Christian. He wears a wrist band that says "In Jesus Name I Play." In 2020, Temple married Miss USA 2017 winner Kára McCullough. They have three children.

=== Community involvement ===
Temple is a member of the "Starting Five," along with Malcolm Brogdon, Joe Harris, Justin Anderson and Anthony Tolliver. Their goal was to raise $225,000 through Hoops2O, founded by Brogdon, to fund five wells in East Africa by the end of the 2018–19 season. By February 2020, the charity had funded the construction of ten wells in Tanzania and Kenya, bringing water to over 52,000 citizens.
