= Raul Neto =

Brazilian basketball player (born 1992)

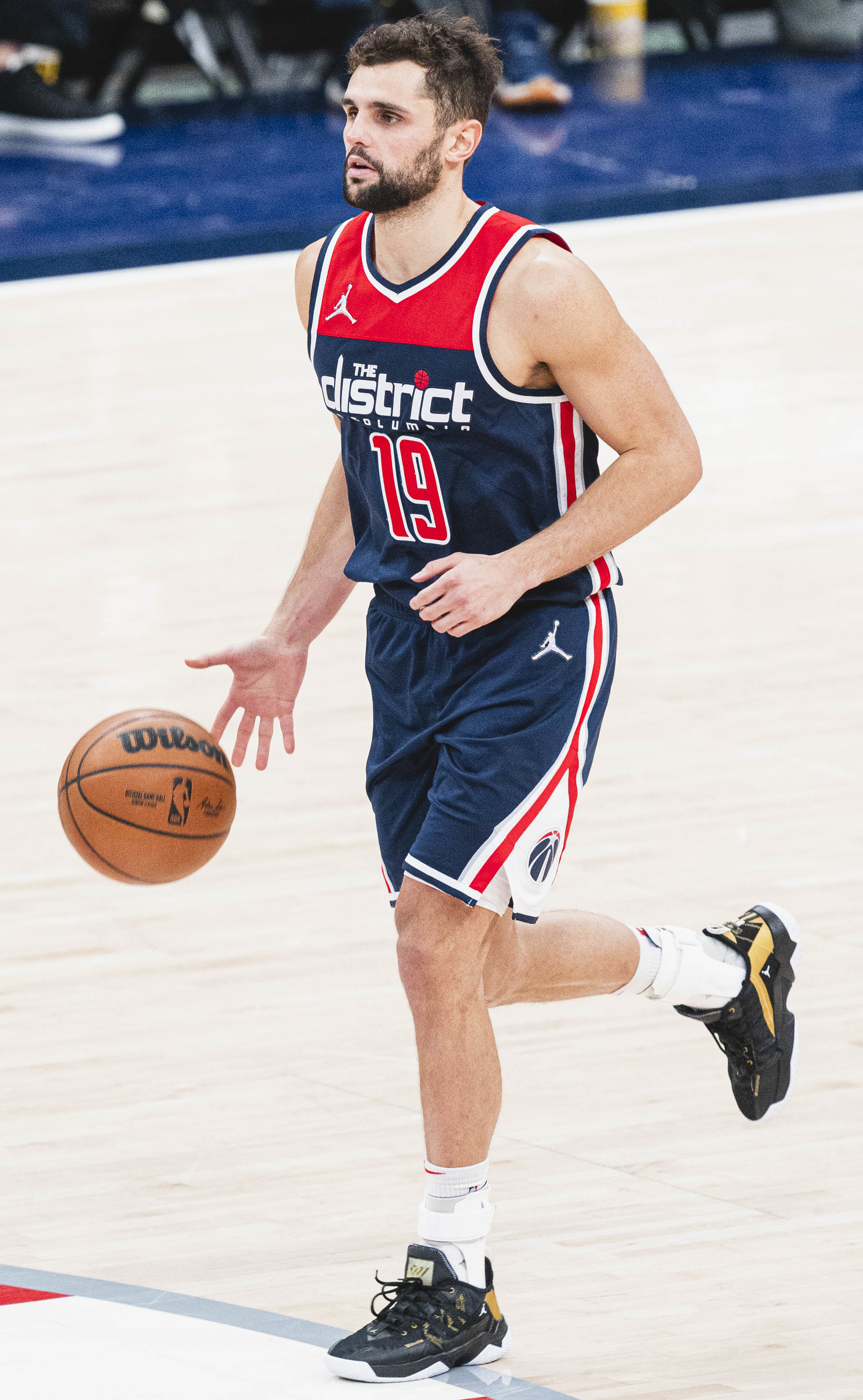
- Neto with the Washington Wizards in 2022

Free agent
- Position: Point guard

Personal information
- Born: 19 May 1992 (age 34) Belo Horizonte, Brazil
- Listed height: 6 ft 2 in (1.88 m)
- Listed weight: 180 lb (82 kg)

Career information
- NBA draft: 2013: 2nd round, 47th overall pick
- Drafted by: Atlanta Hawks
- Playing career: 2008–present

Career history
- 2008–2011: Minas Tênis Clube
- 2011–2014: Gipuzkoa
- 2014–2015: Murcia
- 2015–2019: Utah Jazz
- 2017: →Salt Lake City Stars
- 2019–2020: Philadelphia 76ers
- 2020–2022: Washington Wizards
- 2022–2023: Cleveland Cavaliers
- 2024: Pinheiros
- 2024–2025: FC Barcelona
- 2025–2026: San Pablo Burgos
- 2026: Brisbane Bullets

Career highlights
- NBB All-Star (2011); NBB Revelation Player (2010)
- Stats at NBA.com
- Stats at Basketball Reference
Medals
Men's basketball
Representing Brazil
FIBA South American Championship
Bronze medal – third place	2014 Venezuela

Raul "Raulzinho" Togni Neto (Brazilian Portuguese: [ʁaˈuw toɲɲi ˈnɛtu]; born 19 May 1992) is a Brazilian professional basketball player who last played for the Brisbane Bullets of the Australian National Basketball League (NBL). He is also a member of the senior men's Brazilian national basketball team. Neto also holds an Italian passport.

== Professional career ==
Neto was drafted by the Atlanta Hawks with the 47th pick in the 2013 NBA draft. He was then immediately traded to the Utah Jazz.

=== Minas Tênis Clube (2008–2011) ===
Neto made his professional debut in 2008 with Minas Tênis Clube during the 2008–09 FIBA Americas League. He played a further three seasons for Minas and even represented the World Team at the 2010 Nike Hoop Summit.

=== Gipuzkoa (2011–2014) ===
After averaging 12.6 points and 2.2 assists per game as a sixth man for Minas in 2010–11, Neto signed with Lagun Aro GBC of Spain for the 2011–12 season. After averaging 8.5 points and 2.9 assists per game during the 2012–13 season with Lagun Aro GBC, Neto was selected with the 47th overall pick in the 2013 NBA draft by the Atlanta Hawks. He was later traded to the Utah Jazz on draft night. However, he did not join the Jazz and instead returned to Lagun Aro GBC for the 2013–14 season.

=== Murcia (2014–2015) ===
On August 1, 2014, Neto signed a three-year deal with UCAM Murcia. He parted ways with the club following the 2014–15 season in order to sign in the NBA.

=== Utah Jazz (2015–2019) ===
On July 9, 2015, Neto signed with the Utah Jazz. He made his debut for the Jazz in the team's season opener against the Detroit Pistons on October 28, 2015, recording 8 points and 3 assists as a starter in a 92–87 loss. On January 27, 2016, Neto was selected to the 2016 Rising Stars Challenge as a member of the World Team. On February 19, 2016, he scored a season-high 15 points in a 111–93 win over the Boston Celtics. On January 9, 2017, he spent a day with the Salt Lake City Stars, Utah's D-League affiliate. He was reassigned to Salt Lake City on January 11, 2017, and then recalled the next day. He played 9 of 11 matches of the Jazz during the playoffs. On July 6, 2018, Neto re-signed with the Jazz. On July 2, 2019, Neto was waived by the Jazz due to the Mike Conley trade with Grizzlies.

=== Philadelphia 76ers (2019–2020) ===
On July 4, 2019, Neto agreed to sign with the Philadelphia 76ers.

=== Washington Wizards (2020–2022) ===
On November 22, 2020, Neto signed with the Washington Wizards. As a member of the 2020-2021 Wizards, Neto appeared in 5 playoff games and started in 3.

=== Cleveland Cavaliers (2022–2023) ===
On July 8, 2022, Neto signed with the Cleveland Cavaliers on a one-year, $2,463,490 contract.

On August 5, 2023, Neto signed a one-year deal with Fenerbahçe Beko. However, he never played for the team, because on August 26 he suffered a knee injury playing for the Brazilian national basketball team in the 2023 FIBA Basketball World Cup, which kept him out of action for almost a year. On July 8, 2024, during an interview, Neto revealed that Fenerbahçe terminated his contract after the injury and never officially communicated their decision.

=== Esporte Clube Pinheiros São Paulo (2024) ===
On October 15, 2024, Neto returned to Brazil as he signed a contract with Pinheiros Basquete.

=== FC Barcelona (2024–2025) ===
Neto was announced as a new FC Barcelona player on November 24, 2024, signing a contract for the remainder of the season. The Barcelona board chose Neto after the season-ending injury suffered by point guard Nicolás Laprovíttola had left a vacant spot in the roster. On December 1, 2024, the club announced Neto would be out for four weeks due to an adductor injury. Neto's contract with Barcelona would be terminated in January 2025 after a mutual agreement between the club and the player. The agreement took place after Neto suffered another injury to his left hamstring, making his stay at Barcelona barely over a month long and only making 2 appearances for the Catalans.

=== San Pablo Burgos (2025–2026) ===
On July 3, 2025, Neto signed with San Pablo Burgos of the Liga ACB.

=== Brisbane Bullets (2026) ===
On October 13, 2026, Neto signed with the Brisbane Bullets of the Australian National Basketball League (NBL) as an injury replacement for Arnas Velička. He parted ways with the Bullets on November 21 following Velička's return.

== Career statistics ==
Legend
GP	Games played	GS	Games started	MPG	Minutes per game
FG%	Field goal percentage	3P%	3-point field goal percentage	FT%	Free throw percentage
RPG	Rebounds per game	APG	Assists per game	SPG	Steals per game
BPG	Blocks per game	PPG	Points per game	**Bold**	Career high

=== NBA ===
==== Regular season ====
Year	Team	GP	GS	MPG	FG%	3P%	FT%	RPG	APG	SPG	BPG	PPG
2015–16	Utah	**81**	**53**	18.5	.431	.395	.743	1.5	2.1	.8	.0	5.9
2016–17	Utah	40	0	8.6	.451	.323	.889	.8	.9	.5	**.1**	2.5
2017–18	Utah	41	0	12.1	.457	**.404**	.743	1.2	1.8	.3	**.1**	4.5
2018–19	Utah	37	1	12.8	.460	.333	.848	1.7	2.5	.4	**.1**	5.3
2019–20	Philadelphia	54	3	12.4	.455	.386	.830	1.1	1.8	.4	**.1**	5.1
2020–21	Washington	64	22	**21.9**	.468	.390	.882	**2.4**	2.3	**1.1**	**.1**	**8.7**
2021–22	Washington	70	19	19.6	.463	.292	.769	1.9	**3.1**	.8	.0	7.5
2022–23	Cleveland	48	1	10.5	**.518**	.286	**.912**	1.0	1.6	.4	**.1**	3.3
Career		435	99	15.6	.458	.361	.812	1.5	2.1	.6	.1	5.7

==== Playoffs ====
Year	Team	GP	GS	MPG	FG%	3P%	FT%	RPG	APG	SPG	BPG	PPG
2017	Utah	**9**	0	6.7	**.615**	**.500**	**1.000**	.8	.4	.1	**.1**	2.6
2018	Utah	8	0	9.0	.304	.286	**1.000**	1.3	1.3	.3	.0	2.6
2019	Utah	3	0	6.5	.167	.000	—	1.0	.3	.0	.0	.7
2020	Philadelphia	2	0	13.0	.333	.400	—	1.5	**1.5**	**.5**	.0	4.0
2021	Washington	5	**3**	**22.4**	.353	.267	.800	**2.2**	1.0	.4	.0	**6.4**
2023	Cleveland	2	0	3.5	.000	.000	.500	.0	.5	.0	.0	.5
Career		29	3	10.2	.360	.314	.875	1.2	.8	.2	.0	3.0

== National team career ==
Neto gained attention after leading the Brazil under-18 team to an impressive runners-up showing at the 2010 FIBA Americas Under-18 Championship. He followed that up by being the youngest member of the senior Brazil national basketball team during the 2010 FIBA World Championship, but played sparingly. He later participated for the senior national team at the 2012 Summer Olympics, the 2013 FIBA AmeriCup, and the 2014 FIBA Basketball World Cup. During the World Cup, he had a strong performance against Argentina in the round of 16, when he scored 21 points to lead Brazil to a win. Neto also played at the 2016 Summer Olympics.
