= 2019–20 Philadelphia 76ers season =

NBA professional basketball team season

- Head coach: Brett Brown
- General manager: Elton Brand
- Owners: Josh Harris
- Arena: Wells Fargo Center

Results
- Record: 43–30 (.589)
- Place: Division: 3rd (Atlantic); Conference: 6th (Eastern)
- Playoff finish: First round (lost to Celtics 0–4)
- Stats at Basketball Reference

Local media
- Television: NBCSPHI, NBCSPHI+, 6ABC
- Radio: WPEN

The 2019–20 Philadelphia 76ers season was the 71st season of the franchise in the National Basketball Association (NBA).

The season was suspended by league officials following the games of March 11 after it was reported that Rudy Gobert tested positive for COVID-19. On March 19, it was announced that three people from team's staff tested positive for COVID-19.

Coach Brett Brown was fired after the 76ers lost in a 4-game sweep to the Boston Celtics.

== Draft picks ==
Round	Pick	Player	Position(s)	Nationality	College / Club
1	24	Ty Jerome	PG	United States	Virginia
2	33	Carsen Edwards	PG	United States	Purdue
2	34	Bruno Fernando	C	Angola	Maryland
2	42	Admiral Schofield	SF	United States	Tennessee
2	54	Marial Shayok	SG	Canada	Iowa State

The 76ers held one first-round pick and four second-round picks. The 24th and 33rd picks was traded to the Boston Celtics for Matisse Thybulle, while the 34th pick was traded to the Atlanta Hawks for Jordan Bone and two future second-round draft picks. Also, the 42nd pick was traded to the Washington Wizards for cash considerations, along with trading away Jonathon Simmons.

== Roster ==
2019–20 Philadelphia 76ers roster
Players

Pos.	No.	Player	Height	Weight	DOB	From
F	45	Ryan Broekhoff	6 ft 7 in (2.01 m)	215 lb (98 kg)	1991–07–23	Valparaiso
G	20	Alec Burks	6 ft 6 in (1.98 m)	214 lb (97 kg)	1990–08–20	Colorado
C	21	Joel Embiid	7 ft 0 in (2.13 m)	280 lb (127 kg)	1994–03–16	Kansas
F	12	Tobias Harris	6 ft 9 in (2.06 m)	235 lb (107 kg)	1992–07–15	Tennessee
F/C	42	Al Horford	6 ft 10 in (2.08 m)	240 lb (109 kg)	1986–06–03	Florida
G/F	30	Furkan Korkmaz	6 ft 7 in (2.01 m)	202 lb (92 kg)	1997–07–24	Turkey
G	18	Shake Milton	6 ft 5 in (1.96 m)	205 lb (93 kg)	1996–09–26	SMU
G	19	Raul Neto	6 ft 1 in (1.85 m)	180 lb (82 kg)	1992–05–19	Brazil
C	9	Kyle O'Quinn	6 ft 10 in (2.08 m)	250 lb (113 kg)	1990–03–26	Norfolk State
C	14	Norvel Pelle	6 ft 10 in (2.08 m)	231 lb (105 kg)	1993–02–03	Price HS (CA)
G	0	Josh Richardson	6 ft 5 in (1.96 m)	200 lb (91 kg)	1993–09–15	Tennessee
F	40	Glenn Robinson	6 ft 7 in (2.01 m)	222 lb (101 kg)	1994–01–08	Michigan
F	1	Mike Scott	6 ft 7 in (2.01 m)	237 lb (108 kg)	1988–07–16	Virginia
G	35	Marial Shayok (TW)	6 ft 5 in (1.96 m)	196 lb (89 kg)	1995–07–26	Iowa State
F	25	Ben Simmons	6 ft 10 in (2.08 m)	240 lb (109 kg)	1996–07–20	LSU
G	5	Zhaire Smith	6 ft 3 in (1.91 m)	205 lb (93 kg)	1999–06–04	Texas Tech
G	22	Matisse Thybulle	6 ft 5 in (1.96 m)	200 lb (91 kg)	1997–03–04	Washington

Coaches
Head coach
- Brett Brown
Assistant(s)
- Dave Joerger
- John Bryant
- Ime Udoka

Legend
- (DP) Unsigned draft pick
- (FA) Free agent
- (S) Suspended
- (GL) On assignment to G League affiliate
- (TW) Two-way affiliate player
- Injured

Roster
Updated: 2020–02–08

== Standings ==
=== Atlantic division ===
Atlantic Division	W	L	PCT	GB	Home	Road	Div	GP
y – Toronto Raptors	53	19	.736	–	26‍–‍10	27‍–‍9	9–5	72
x – Boston Celtics	48	24	.667	5.0	26‍–‍10	22‍–‍14	9–6	72
x – Philadelphia 76ers	43	30	.589	10.5	31‍–‍4	12‍–‍26	11–5	73
x – Brooklyn Nets	35	37	.486	18.0	20‍–‍16	15‍–‍21	6–10	72
New York Knicks	21	45	.318	29.0	11‍–‍22	10‍–‍23	2–11	66

=== Conference standings ===
Eastern Conference
#	Team	W	L	PCT	GB	GP
1	z – Milwaukee Bucks *	56	17	.767	–	73
2	y – Toronto Raptors *	53	19	.736	2.5	72
3	x – Boston Celtics	48	24	.667	7.5	72
4	x – Indiana Pacers	45	28	.616	11.0	73
5	y – Miami Heat *	44	29	.603	12.0	73
6	x – Philadelphia 76ers	43	30	.589	13.0	73
7	x – Brooklyn Nets	35	37	.486	20.5	72
8	x – Orlando Magic	33	40	.452	23.0	73
9	Washington Wizards	25	47	.347	30.5	72
10	Charlotte Hornets	23	42	.354	29.0	65
11	Chicago Bulls	22	43	.338	30.0	65
12	New York Knicks	21	45	.318	31.5	66
13	Detroit Pistons	20	46	.303	32.5	66
14	Atlanta Hawks	20	47	.299	33.0	67
15	Cleveland Cavaliers	19	46	.292	33.0	65

== Game log ==
=== Preseason ===
2019 pre-season game log
Total: 4–1 (home: 2–1; road: 2–0)
Pre-season: 4–1 (home: 2–1; road: 2–0)

Game	Date	Team	Score	High points	High rebounds	High assists	Location Attendance	Record
1	October 8	Guangzhou	W 144–86	Ben Simmons (21)	Tobias Harris (9)	Ben Simmons (7)	Wells Fargo Center; 20,155	1–0
2	October 11	@ Charlotte	W 100–87	Josh Richardson (18)	Al Horford (9)	Kyle O'Quinn (5)	Lawrence Joel Veterans Memorial Coliseum; 10,437	2–0
3	October 13	@ Orlando	W 126–94	Joel Embiid (15)	Joel Embiid (9)	Kyle O'Quinn (9)	Amway Center; 16,819	3–0
4	October 15	Detroit	W 106–86	Joel Embiid (24)	Kyle O'Quinn (11)	Josh Richardson (6)	Wells Fargo Center; 14,317	4–0
5	October 18	Washington	L 93–112	Joel Embiid (17)	Tobias Harris (9)	Al Horford (5)	Wells Fargo Center; 15,347	4–1

2019–20 pre-season schedule

=== Regular season ===
2019–20 game log
Total: 43–30 (home: 31–4; road: 12–26)
October: 4–0 (home: 2–0; road: 2–0)

Game	Date	Team	Score	High points	High rebounds	High assists	Location Attendance	Record
1	October 23	Boston	W 107–93	Ben Simmons (24)	Tobias Harris (15)	Ben Simmons (9)	Wells Fargo Center; 20,422	1–0
2	October 26	@ Detroit	W 117–111	Tobias Harris (29)	Al Horford (9)	Ben Simmons (10)	Little Caesars Arena; 16,207	2–0
3	October 28	@ Atlanta	W 105–103	Joel Embiid (36)	Joel Embiid (13)	Ben Simmons (6)	State Farm Arena; 14,094	3–0
4	October 30	Minnesota	W 117–95	Joel Embiid (19)	Al Horford (16)	Ben Simmons (7)	Wells Fargo Center; 20,204	4–0

November: 10–6 (home: 7–0; road: 3–6)

Game	Date	Team	Score	High points	High rebounds	High assists	Location Attendance	Record
5	November 2	@ Portland	W 129–128	Al Horford (25)	Ben Simmons (11)	Ben Simmons (8)	Moda Center; 19,441	5–0
6	November 4	@ Phoenix	L 109–114	Al Horford (32)	Tobias Harris (10)	Ben Simmons (6)	Talking Stick Resort Arena; 14,285	5–1
7	November 6	@ Utah	L 104–106	Joel Embiid (27)	Joel Embiid (16)	Neto, Richardson (4)	Vivint Smart Home Arena; 18,306	5–2
8	November 8	@ Denver	L 97–100	Joel Embiid (19)	Joel Embiid (15)	Raul Neto (6)	Pepsi Center; 19,520	5–3
9	November 10	Charlotte	W 114–106	Joel Embiid (18)	Joel Embiid (9)	Josh Richardson (6)	Wells Fargo Center; 20,311	6–3
10	November 12	Cleveland	W 98–97	Joel Embiid (27)	Joel Embiid (16)	Ben Simmons (6)	Wells Fargo Center; 20,294	7–3
11	November 13	@ Orlando	L 97–112	Josh Richardson (19)	Tobias Harris (10)	Tobias Harris (6)	Amway Center; 15,113	7–4
12	November 15	@ Oklahoma City	L 119–127 (OT)	Joel Embiid (31)	Joel Embiid (12)	Ben Simmons (8)	Chesapeake Energy Arena; 18,203	7–5
13	November 17	@ Cleveland	W 114–95	Tobias Harris (27)	Al Horford (6)	Ben Simmons (11)	Rocket Mortgage FieldHouse; 19,432	8–5
14	November 20	New York	W 109–104	Joel Embiid (23)	Joel Embiid (12)	Ben Simmons (13)	Wells Fargo Center; 20,384	9–5
15	November 22	San Antonio	W 115–104	Tobias Harris (26)	Joel Embiid (14)	Ben Simmons (13)	Wells Fargo Center; 20,927	10–5
16	November 23	Miami	W 113–86	Josh Richardson (32)	Joel Embiid (11)	Ben Simmons (7)	Wells Fargo Center; 21,017	11–5
17	November 25	@ Toronto	L 96–101	Josh Richardson (25)	Joel Embiid (13)	Ben Simmons (14)	Scotiabank Arena; 19,800	11–6
18	November 27	Sacramento	W 97–91	Joel Embiid (33)	Joel Embiid (16)	Horford, Simmons (5)	Wells Fargo Center; 20,592	12–6
19	November 29	@ New York	W 101–95	Joel Embiid (27)	Joel Embiid (17)	Ben Simmons (8)	Madison Square Garden; 18,109	13–6
20	November 30	Indiana	W 119–116	Joel Embiid (32)	Joel Embiid (11)	Ben Simmons (13)	Wells Fargo Center; 20,517	14–6

December: 9–7 (home: 7–2; road: 2–5)

Game	Date	Team	Score	High points	High rebounds	High assists	Location Attendance	Record
21	December 2	Utah	W 103–94	Tobias Harris (26)	Joel Embiid (11)	Ben Simmons (9)	Wells Fargo Center; 20,208	15–6
22	December 5	@ Washington	L 113–119	Tobias Harris (33)	Joel Embiid (21)	Ben Simmons (10)	Capital One Arena; 16,554	15–7
23	December 7	Cleveland	W 141–94	Ben Simmons (34)	Kyle O'Quinn (11)	Trey Burke (8)	Wells Fargo Center; 20,844	16–7
24	December 8	Toronto	W 110–104	Tobias Harris (26)	Ben Simmons (11)	Ben Simmons (9)	Wells Fargo Center; 20,313	17–7
25	December 10	Denver	W 97–92	Joel Embiid (22)	Joel Embiid (10)	Ben Simmons (7)	Wells Fargo Center; 20,591	18–7
26	December 12	@ Boston	W 115–109	Joel Embiid (38)	Joel Embiid (13)	Tobias Harris (7)	TD Garden; 19,156	19–7
27	December 13	New Orleans	W 116–109	Tobias Harris (31)	Joel Embiid (11)	Ben Simmons (11)	Wells Fargo Center; 20,620	20–7
28	December 15	@ Brooklyn	L 89–109	Ben Simmons (20)	Al Horford (9)	Al Horford (5)	Barclays Center; 17,732	20–8
29	December 18	Miami	L 104–108	Joel Embiid (22)	Joel Embiid (19)	Richardson, Simmons (6)	Wells Fargo Center; 20,715	20–9
30	December 20	Dallas	L 98–117	Joel Embiid (33)	Joel Embiid (17)	Ben Simmons (8)	Wells Fargo Center; 20,778	20–10
31	December 21	Washington	W 125–108	Embiid, Richardson (21)	Joel Embiid (13)	Ben Simmons (11)	Wells Fargo Center; 20,529	21–10
32	December 23	@ Detroit	W 125–109	Tobias Harris (35)	Ben Simmons (13)	Ben Simmons (17)	Little Caesars Arena; 16,476	22–10
33	December 25	Milwaukee	W 121–109	Joel Embiid (31)	Joel Embiid (11)	Ben Simmons (14)	Wells Fargo Center; 21,028	23–10
34	December 27	@ Orlando	L 97–98	Embiid, Harris (24)	Embiid, Harris (11)	Ben Simmons (7)	Amway Center; 17,311	23–11
35	December 28	@ Miami	L 116–117 (OT)	Joel Embiid (35)	Joel Embiid (11)	Ben Simmons (11)	American Airlines Arena; 19,865	23–12
36	December 31	@ Indiana	L 97–115	Josh Richardson (20)	O'Quinn, Simmons (10)	O'Quinn, Richardson (5)	Bankers Life Fieldhouse; 17,923	23–13

January: 8–5 (home: 6–0; road: 2–5)

Game	Date	Team	Score	High points	High rebounds	High assists	Location Attendance	Record
37	January 3	@ Houston	L 108–118	Ben Simmons (29)	Ben Simmons (13)	Ben Simmons (11)	Toyota Center; 18,055	23–14
38	January 6	Oklahoma City	W 120–113	Josh Richardson (23)	Ben Simmons (15)	Embiid, Simmons (8)	Wells Fargo Center; 20,561	24–14
39	January 9	Boston	W 109–98	Josh Richardson (29)	Ben Simmons (9)	Josh Richardson (7)	Wells Fargo Center; 20,822	25–14
40	January 11	@ Dallas	L 91–109	Tobias Harris (20)	Tobias Harris (10)	Ben Simmons (11)	American Airlines Center; 20,244	25–15
41	January 13	@ Indiana	L 95–101	Ben Simmons (24)	Ben Simmons (14)	Al Horford (5)	Bankers Life Fieldhouse; 15,257	25–16
42	January 15	Brooklyn	W 117–106	Tobias Harris (34)	Tobias Harris (10)	Ben Simmons (11)	Wells Fargo Center; 20,416	26–16
43	January 17	Chicago	W 100–89	Furkan Korkmaz (24)	Ben Simmons (11)	Ben Simmons (7)	Wells Fargo Center; 20,919	27–16
44	January 18	@ New York	W 90–87	Ben Simmons (21)	Tobias Harris (8)	Ben Simmons (8)	Madison Square Garden; 17,812	28–16
45	January 20	@ Brooklyn	W 117–111	Ben Simmons (34)	Ben Simmons (12)	Ben Simmons (12)	Barclays Center; 16,801	29–16
46	January 22	@ Toronto	L 95–107	Tobias Harris (22)	Horford, Simmons (10)	Ben Simmons (8)	Scotiabank Arena; 19,800	29–17
47	January 25	L. A. Lakers	W 108–91	Tobias Harris (29)	Ben Simmons (10)	Ben Simmons (8)	Wells Fargo Center; 21,109	30–17
48	January 28	Golden State	W 115–104	Joel Embiid (24)	Al Horford (11)	Al Horford (8)	Wells Fargo Center; 20,854	31–17
49	January 30	@ Atlanta	L 117–127	Ben Simmons (31)	Joel Embiid (14)	Shake Milton (6)	State Farm Arena; 15,227	31–18

February: 6–5 (home: 6–0; road: 0–5)

Game	Date	Team	Score	High points	High rebounds	High assists	Location Attendance	Record
50	February 1	@ Boston	L 95–116	Ben Simmons (23)	Horford, Simmons (9)	Ben Simmons (5)	TD Garden; 19,156	31–19
51	February 3	@ Miami	L 106–137	Joel Embiid (29)	Joel Embiid (12)	Ben Simmons (7)	American Airlines Arena; 19,725	31–20
52	February 6	@ Milwaukee	L 101–112	Tobias Harris (25)	Ben Simmons (14)	Ben Simmons (9)	Fiserv Forum; 17,928	31–21
53	February 7	Memphis	W 119–107	Furkan Korkmaz (34)	Joel Embiid (10)	Ben Simmons (10)	Wells Fargo Center; 20,779	32–21
54	February 9	Chicago	W 118–111	Furkan Korkmaz (31)	Joel Embiid (12)	Ben Simmons (10)	Wells Fargo Center; 21,018	33–21
55	February 11	L. A. Clippers	W 110–103	Embiid, Simmons (26)	Harris, Simmons (12)	Ben Simmons (10)	Wells Fargo Center; 20,730	34–21
56	February 20	Brooklyn	W 112–104 (OT)	Joel Embiid (39)	Joel Embiid (16)	Tobias Harris (6)	Wells Fargo Center; 20,806	35–21
57	February 22	@ Milwaukee	L 98–119	Embiid, Korkmaz, Milton (17)	Joel Embiid (11)	Joel Embiid (4)	Fiserv Forum; 18,290	35–22
58	February 24	Atlanta	W 129–112	Joel Embiid (49)	Joel Embiid (14)	Shake Milton (6)	Wells Fargo Center; 20,836	36–22
59	February 26	@ Cleveland	L 94–108	Shake Milton (20)	Josh Richardson (8)	Al Horford (5)	Rocket Mortgage FieldHouse; 16,332	36–23
60	February 27	New York	W 115–106	Tobias Harris (34)	Kyle O'Quinn (10)	Al Horford (9)	Wells Fargo Center; 20,175	37–23

March: 2–3 (home: 1–0; road: 1–3)

Game	Date	Team	Score	High points	High rebounds	High assists	Location Attendance	Record
61	March 1	@ L. A. Clippers	L 130–136	Shake Milton (39)	Al Horford (8)	Al Horford (6)	Staples Center; 19,068	37–24
62	March 3	@ L. A. Lakers	L 107–120	Glenn Robinson III (25)	Al Horford (11)	Shake Milton (6)	Staples Center; 18,997	37–25
63	March 5	@ Sacramento	W 125–108	Tobias Harris (28)	Tobias Harris (14)	Al Horford (6)	Golden 1 Center; 15,485	38–25
64	March 7	@ Golden State	L 114–118	Tobias Harris (24)	Horford, Scott (10)	Al Horford (7)	Chase Center; 18,064	38–26
65	March 11	Detroit	W 124–106	Joel Embiid (30)	Joel Embiid (14)	Al Horford (6)	Wells Fargo Center; 20,172	39–26

Seeding games: 4–4 (home: 2–2; road: 2–2)

Game	Date	Team	Score	High points	High rebounds	High assists	Location Attendance	Record
66	August 1	@ Indiana	L 121–127	Joel Embiid (41)	Joel Embiid (21)	Embiid, Simmons (4)	Visa Athletic Center; No In-Person Attendance	39–27
67	August 3	San Antonio	W 132–130	Joel Embiid (27)	Joel Embiid (9)	Embiid, Simmons (5)	Visa Athletic Center; No In-Person Attendance	40–27
68	August 5	@ Washington	W 107–98	Joel Embiid (30)	Joel Embiid (11)	Al Horford (5)	The Arena; No In-Person Attendance	41–27
69	August 7	Orlando	W 108–101	Embiid, Harris (23)	Tobias Harris (15)	Shake Milton (8)	HP Field House; No In-Person Attendance	42–27
70	August 9	@ Portland	L 121–124	Josh Richardson (34)	Matisse Thybulle (9)	Josh Richardson (6)	Visa Athletic Center; No In-Person Attendance	42–28
71	August 11	Phoenix	L 117–130	Alec Burks (23)	Kyle O'Quinn (10)	Kyle O'Quinn (11)	Visa Athletic Center; No In-Person Attendance	42–29
72	August 12	Toronto	L 121–125	Tobias Harris (22)	Joel Embiid (9)	4 players (5)	HP Field House; No In-Person Attendance	42–30
73	August 14	@ Houston	W 134–96	Tobias Harris (18)	Harris, Scott (7)	Burks, Neto, O'Quinn (5)	The Arena; No In-Person Attendance	43–30

Cancelled games

Game	Date	Team	Score	High points	High rebounds	High assists	Location Attendance	Record
66	March 14	Indiana					Wells Fargo Center	
67	March 16	Washington					Wells Fargo Center	
68	March 18	Toronto					Wells Fargo Center	
69	March 19	@ Charlotte					Spectrum Center	
70	March 21	Atlanta					Wells Fargo Center	
71	March 24	@ Minnesota					Target Center	
72	March 26	@ Chicago					United Center	
73	March 27	Phoenix					Wells Fargo Center	
74	March 29	Portland					Wells Fargo Center	
75	March 31	Houston					Wells Fargo Center	
76	April 3	@ Washington					Capital One Arena	
77	April 5	Orlando					Wells Fargo Center	
78	April 7	Milwaukee					Wells Fargo Center	
79	April 10	@ San Antonio					AT&T Center	
80	April 11	@ New Orleans					Smoothie King Center	
81	April 13	@ Memphis					FedExForum	
82	April 15	Charlotte					Wells Fargo Center	

2019–20 season schedule

On January 25, 2020, the 76ers hosted the eventual champion Los Angeles Lakers, in a 108–91 victory. The next day, Lakers legend and Philadelphia native Kobe Bryant died in a California helicopter crash, along with his 13-year-old daughter Gianna and seven others. During the game, Lakers’ LeBron James surpassed Bryant for fourth place on the NBA's all-time scoring list.

=== Playoffs ===
2020 playoff game log
Total: 0–4 (home: 0–2; road: 0–2)
First Round: 0–4 (home: 0–2; road: 0–2)

Game	Date	Team	Score	High points	High rebounds	High assists	Location Attendance	Series
1	August 17	@ Boston	L 101–109	Joel Embiid (26)	Joel Embiid (16)	Tobias Harris (8)	HP Field House; No in-person attendance	0–1
2	August 19	@ Boston	L 101–128	Joel Embiid (34)	Tobias Harris (11)	Shake Milton (4)	HP Field House; No in-person attendance	0–2
3	August 21	Boston	L 94–102	Joel Embiid (30)	Tobias Harris (15)	Tobias Harris (4)	HP Field House; No in-person attendance	0–3
4	August 23	Boston	L 106–110	Joel Embiid (30)	Embiid, Horford (10)	Josh Richardson (5)	HP Field House; No in-person attendance	0–4

2020 playoff schedule

== Player statistics ==
Legend
GP	Games played	GS	Games started	MPG	Minutes per game
FG%	Field-goal percentage	3P%	3-point field-goal percentage	FT%	Free-throw percentage
RPG	Rebounds per game	APG	Assists per game	SPG	Steals per game
BPG	Blocks per game	PPG	Points per game

=== Regular season ===
Player	GP	GS	MPG	FG%	3P%	FT%	RPG	APG	SPG	BPG	PPG
Tobias Harris	72	72	34.3	.471	.367	.806	6.9	3.2	.7	.6	19.6
Furkan Korkmaz	72	12	21.7	.430	.402	.755	2.3	1.1	.6	.2	9.8
Mike Scott	68	11	17.8	.426	.369	.811	3.6	.8	.3	.1	6.0
Al Horford	67	61	30.2	.450	.350	.763	6.8	4.0	.8	.9	11.9
Matisse Thybulle	65	14	19.8	.423	.357	.610	1.6	1.2	1.4	.7	4.7
Ben Simmons	57	57	35.4	.580	.286	.621	7.8	8.0	2.1	.6	16.4
Josh Richardson	55	53	30.8	.430	.341	.809	3.2	2.9	.9	.7	13.7
Raul Neto	54	3	12.4	.455	.386	.830	1.1	1.8	.4	.1	5.1
Joel Embiid	51	51	29.5	.477	.331	.807	11.6	3.0	.9	1.3	23.0
James Ennis III^{†}	49	0	15.8	.442	.349	.787	3.1	.8	.5	.3	5.8
Shake Milton	40	24	20.1	.484	.430	.785	2.2	2.6	.5	.2	9.4
Kyle O'Quinn	29	2	10.8	.494	.259	.550	4.0	1.8	.2	.8	3.5
Trey Burke^{†}	25	0	13.2	.465	.421	.722	1.4	2.1	.3	.0	5.9
Norvel Pelle	24	0	9.7	.521	.000	.500	3.0	.3	.1	1.3	2.4
Alec Burks^{†}	18	1	20.2	.461	.416	.829	3.1	2.1	.7	.0	12.2
Glenn Robinson III^{†}	14	4	19.3	.518	.333	.917	3.1	.8	.6	.1	7.7
Zhaire Smith	7	0	4.6	.273	.000	.500	.3	.3	.4	.0	1.1
Marial Shayok	4	0	7.0	.250	.333	.750	1.8	.3	.0	.3	2.8
Jonah Bolden^{†}	4	0	3.5	.667	.000	.000	.3	.0	.3	.0	1.0

=== Playoffs ===
Player	GP	GS	MPG	FG%	3P%	FT%	RPG	APG	SPG	BPG	PPG
Tobias Harris	4	4	37.3	.383	.133	.789	9.5	4.0	.5	.3	15.8
Joel Embiid	4	4	36.3	.459	.250	.814	12.3	1.3	1.5	1.3	30.0
Josh Richardson	4	4	36.0	.357	.357	.944	3.8	3.3	.5	.5	16.8
Shake Milton	4	4	31.5	.477	.400	.857	3.3	2.8	.5	.0	14.5
Al Horford	4	3	32.3	.480	.000	.571	7.3	2.3	.3	1.3	7.0
Matisse Thybulle	4	1	18.8	.429	.250		1.8	.5	.8	.3	1.8
Alec Burks	4	0	23.8	.327	.188	.778	3.8	1.8	.3	.8	10.5
Furkan Korkmaz	4	0	10.0	.000	.000	.600	1.5	.5	.3	.0	.8
Mike Scott	4	0	5.0	.200	.000	1.000	2.0	.3	.0	.0	1.5
Raul Neto	2	0	13.0	.333	.400		1.5	1.5	.5	.0	4.0
Norvel Pelle	1	0	7.0				.0	.0	1.0	1.0	.0
Kyle O'Quinn	1	0	6.0				1.0	1.0	.0	.0	.0

- ^{†} Denotes player spent time with another team in the season. Stats reflect time with the 76ers only.

== Transactions ==
=== Trades ===
July 6, 2019
Four–team trade
To Miami Heat

(United States) Jimmy Butler (Sign and trade from Philadelphia)
(United States) Meyers Leonard (from Portland)
Cash Considerations (from L.A. Clippers)

To Los Angeles Clippers

(United States) Maurice Harkless (from Portland)
(France) Mathias Lessort (Draft rights from Philadelphia)

2023 protected first-round pick (from Miami)

To Portland Trail Blazers

(United States) Hassan Whiteside (from Miami)

To Philadelphia 76ers

(United States) Josh Richardson (from Miami)

=== Free agents ===
==== Re-signed ====
Player	Signed
Shake Milton	July 7, 2019
Tobias Harris	July 10, 2019
Mike Scott	July 10, 2019
James Ennis III	July 11, 2019
Furkan Korkmaz	July 25, 2019

==== Additions ====
Player	Signed	Former Team
Al Horford	July 10, 2019	Boston Celtics
Raul Neto	July 11, 2019	Utah Jazz
Kyle O'Quinn	July 11, 2019	Indiana Pacers
Trey Burke	July 30, 2019	Dallas Mavericks

==== Subtractions ====
Player	Reason Left	New Team
JJ Redick	Free Agency	New Orleans Pelicans
Boban Marjanović	Free Agency	Dallas Mavericks
T. J. McConnell	Free Agency	Indiana Pacers
