= Lance Thomas =

American basketball player (born 1988)

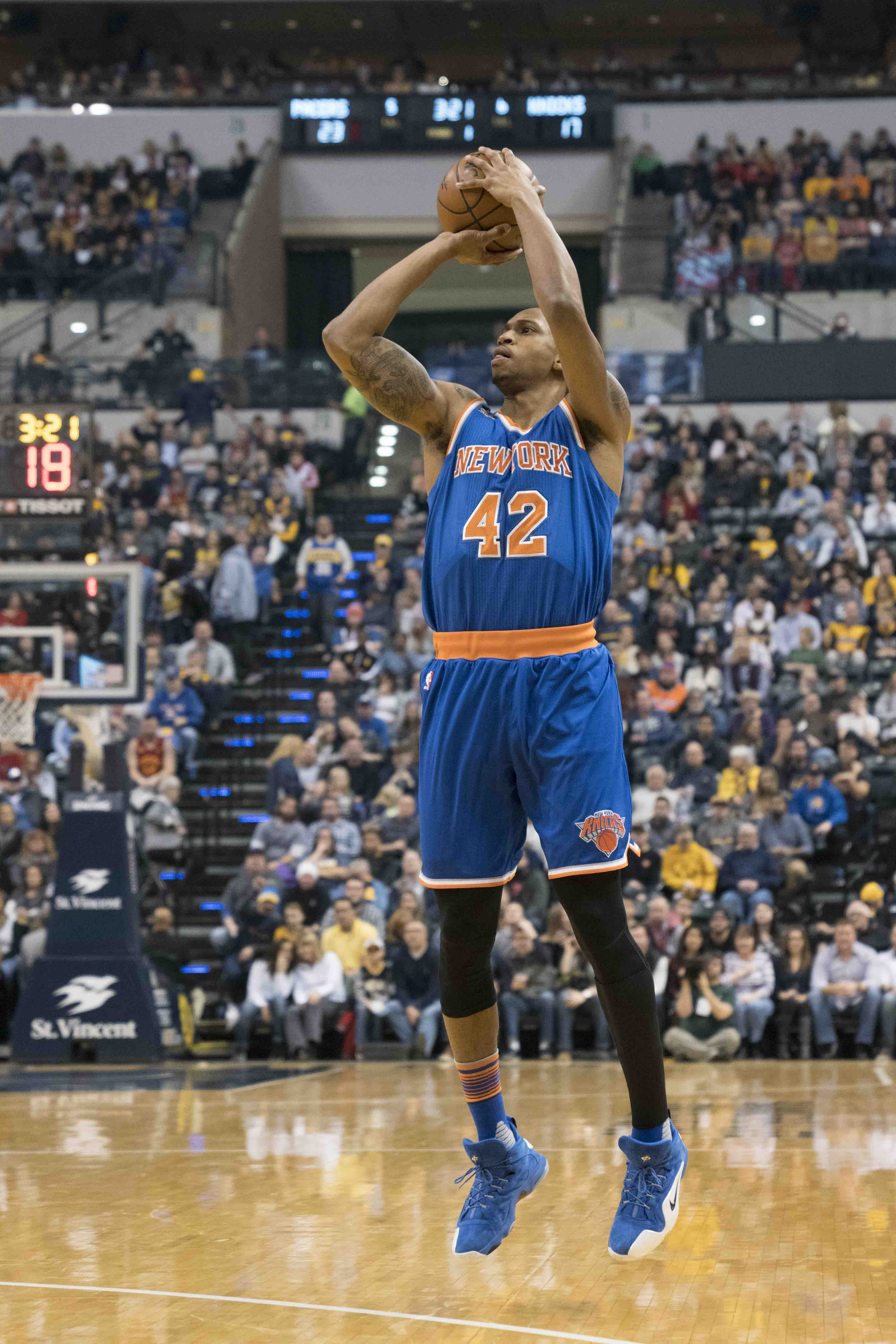
- Thomas with the New York Knicks in 2017

Personal information
- Born: April 24, 1988 (age 38) Brooklyn, New York, U.S.
- Listed height: 6 ft 8 in (2.03 m)
- Listed weight: 225 lb (102 kg)

Career information
- High school: Scotch Plains-Fanwood (Scotch Plains, New Jersey); St. Benedict's Prep (Newark, New Jersey)
- College: Duke (2006–2010)
- NBA draft: 2010: undrafted
- Playing career: 2010–2025
- Position: Power forward / small forward
- Number: 42

Career history
- 2010–2012: Austin Toros
- 2011–2013: New Orleans Hornets / Pelicans
- 2013–2014: Foshan Dralions
- 2014–2015: Oklahoma City Thunder
- 2015–2019: New York Knicks
- 2020: Brooklyn Nets

Career highlights
- NBA D-League All-Star (2012); NCAA champion (2010); ACC All-Defensive Team (2010); McDonald's All-American (2006); Second-team Parade All-American (2006)
- Stats at NBA.com
- Stats at Basketball Reference
Medals
Representing United States
Basketball
Pan American Games
Bronze medal – third place	2011 Guadalajara	United States
FIBA Americas Under-18 Championship
Gold medal – first place	2006 San Antonio	United States

Lance Thomas (born April 24, 1988) is an American former professional basketball player. He played college basketball for the Duke Blue Devils where he started at power forward for the national champion 2010 team.

== High school career ==
Thomas attended Scotch Plains-Fanwood High School in Scotch Plains, New Jersey during his freshman and sophomore years. For his junior and senior years, he attended St. Benedict's Preparatory School. He led the school to two Prep A Division New Jersey State titles with a 56–3 record in his final two seasons while averaging 14.5 points and 6.5 rebounds per game his senior year. In 2005, Thomas played at the USA Basketball Youth Development Festival where he helped the Blue Team win the silver medal with a 3–1 record. Following his senior year, he played in the 2006 McDonald's All-American game.

Considered a four-star recruit by Rivals.com, Thomas was listed as the No. 13 small forward and the No. 42 player in the nation in 2006.

After committing to Duke University on April 5, 2006, Thomas played for the Under 18 national team at the FIBA Americas Under-18 Championship where he helped USA win the gold medal.

=== Recruiting ===
College recruiting
Name	Hometown	School	Height	Weight	Commit date
Lance Thomas; PF	Scotch Plains, NJ	Scotch Plains-Fanwood (NJ)	6 ft 8 in (2.03 m)	225 lb (102 kg)	Apr 5, 2006
Lance Thomas; PF	Recruit ratings: Scout: Rivals:				
Overall recruit ranking: Scout: 6 (PF) Rivals: 42, 13 (F)
Note: In many cases, Scout, Rivals, 247Sports, On3, and ESPN may conflict in their listings of height and weight.; In these cases, the average was taken. ESPN grades are on a 100-point scale.; Sources: "Duke Basketball Commitments". Rivals.; "2006 Duke Basketball Commits". Scout.; "ESPN". ESPN.; "Scout.com Team Recruiting Rankings". Scout.; "2006 Team Ranking". Rivals.

== College career ==
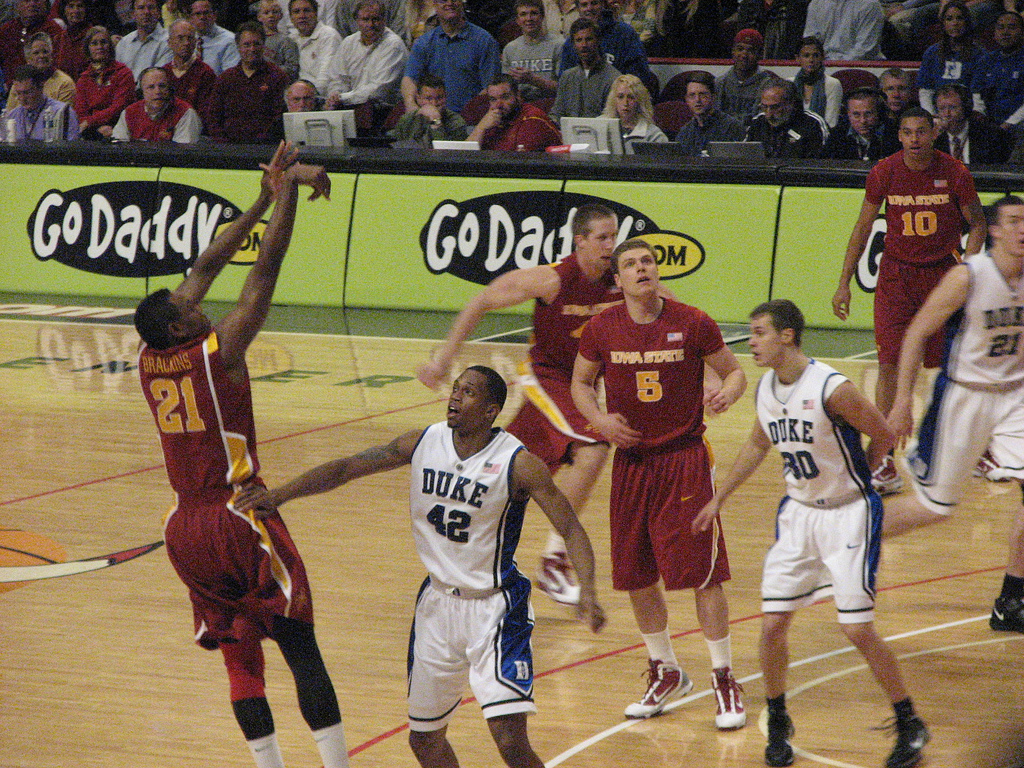
Thomas guarding Craig Brackins of Iowa State.

As a freshman, Thomas averaged 4.0 points and 2.5 rebounds per game, while shooting .568 from the field, in 31 games (18 starts).

""Best game offensively I've played in a Duke uniform. I feel like I've played better games for this team, not including having 21 points. I mean, my game is not defined by how many points I have. But if I can bring a mix of both, and it would be great.""

— Lance Thomas on his career high in points with 21 against Duquesne on November 28, 2008

As a sophomore, Thomas averaged 4.3 points and 3.3 rebounds in 18.5 minutes in 32 games (28 starts). He posted a .505 field goal percentage and recorded at least five rebounds 12 times, including eight of Duke's 16 ACC games.

Thomas' career high in points came on November 28, 2008, when he scored 21 against Duquesne. His new career high broke his previous record of 15 points set on November 20, 2006. Thomas' ability to finish shots was a big staple of his improvement. It was said of him, "If he gets the ball within three feet of the basket, chances are he's going to put the ball in the hoop — regardless of whether he's fouled."

As a junior, Thomas averaged 5.3 points and 3.6 rebounds while shooting .626 from the field, in 37 games (16 starts). Thomas felt that the biggest difference between this year's Duke team and the ones from the last two years, was experience.

In his senior year, Thomas and All-American point guard Jon Scheyer were co-captains of Duke's team. In January 2010, Thomas had a career-high 12 rebounds against NC State. On February 10, the eighth-ranked Blue Devils held on for a 64–54 victory against rival North Carolina. However, Thomas suffered a severe bone bruise to his right knee early in the second half, forcing him to miss the next game against Maryland.

Thomas helped Duke win the 2010 NCAA championship, their fourth since 1991. In the 2010 NCAA championship game, Duke faced Butler and star swingman Gordon Hayward. The Bulldogs had a chance to win with 3.6 seconds left, but Hayward missed a half-court shot, giving Duke a 61–59 win.

Thomas was named to the 2009–10 ACC All-Defensive Team for 2010 and finished his college basketball career ranked 10th on Duke's all-time list in offensive rebounds (255). In 40 games (39 starts) as a senior, he averaged 4.8 points and 4.9 rebounds in 25.3 minutes per game.

== Professional career ==
=== Austin Toros (2010–2012) ===
Between November 2010 and December 2011, Thomas played in the NBA Development League for the Austin Toros. On December 9, 2011, Thomas signed with the New Orleans Hornets for training camp. He made the Hornets' roster for the start of the lockout-shortened 2011–12 NBA season, but he was later waived by the team on December 31.

On January 4, 2012, Thomas was reacquired by the Austin Toros. He was later selected to play in the 2012 NBA Development League All-Star Game. In 65 games for Austin over two seasons, he averaged 13.4 points, 6.2 rebounds and 1.3 assists per game.

=== New Orleans Hornets/Pelicans (2012–2013) ===
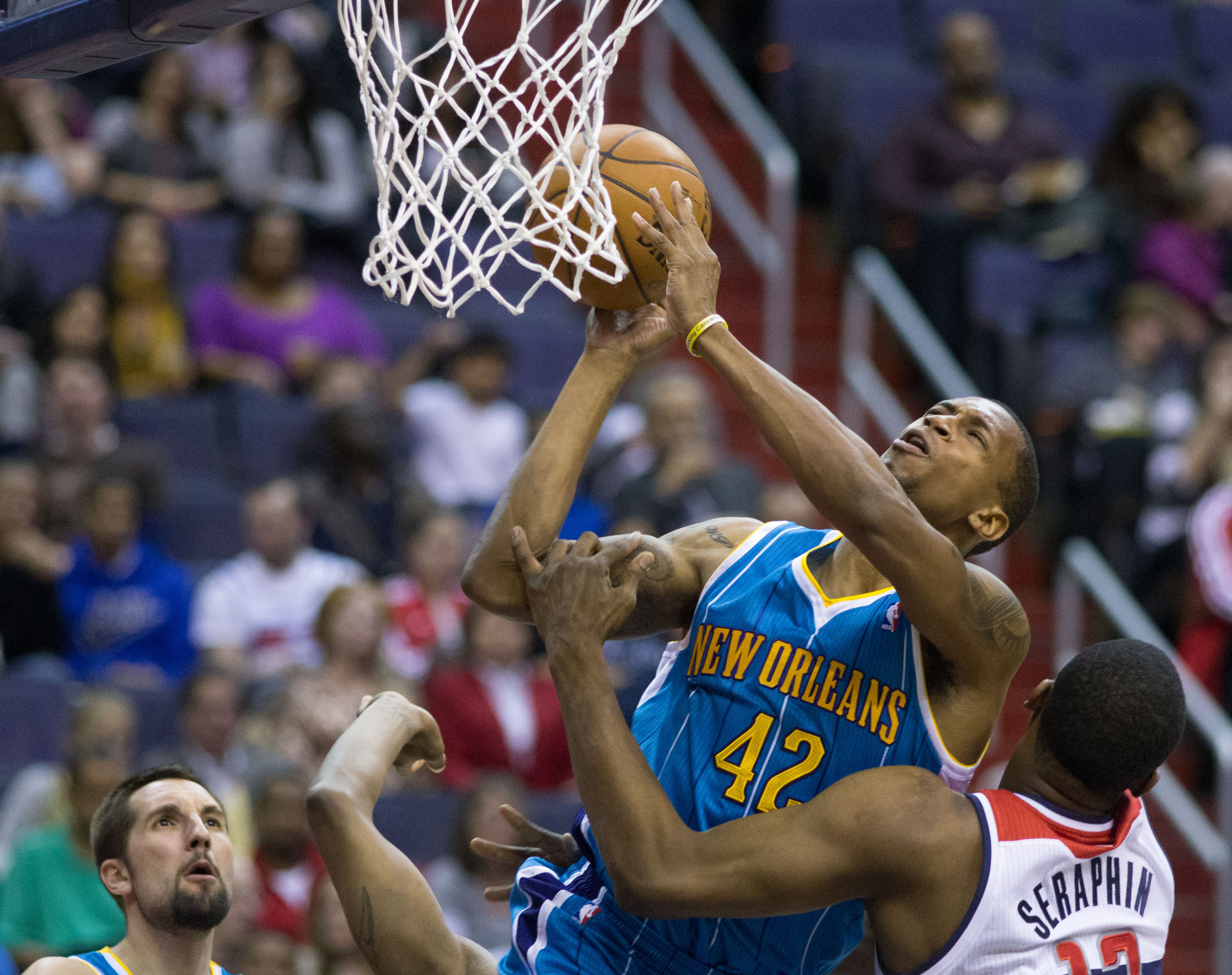
Thomas with the Hornets on March 15, 2013.

On February 6, 2012, Thomas was called up by the New Orleans Hornets, signing a 10-day contract with the team. He later signed a second 10-day contract on February 16, and a multi-year deal on February 27.

In 2012–13, Thomas played in 59 games for the Hornets, averaging 2.5 points and 1.9 rebounds per game. In April 2013, the Hornets were renamed the New Orleans Pelicans.

On July 10, 2013, Thomas was waived by the Pelicans. He later re-signed with the Pelicans on August 22, but he managed just five games for the team in 2013–14 before be was waived again on November 12. In 106 games for New Orleans over three seasons, he averaged 3.0 points and 2.3 rebounds in 12.4 minutes per game.

=== Foshan Dralions (2013–2014) ===
On December 27, 2013, Thomas signed with the Foshan Dralions for the rest of the 2013–14 CBA season. In 16 games for Foshan, he averaged 26.1 points, 10.8 rebounds, 1.0 assists and 1.6 steals per game.

=== Oklahoma City Thunder (2014–2015) ===
On September 29, 2014, Thomas signed with the Oklahoma City Thunder. Thunder head coach Scott Brooks said of Thomas, "Lance is a hard worker. He's a player that can guard multiple positions. He gives you everything he has and that's what you want."

=== New York Knicks (2015–2019) ===
On January 5, 2015, Thomas was traded to the New York Knicks in a three-team, six-player trade that also involved the Thunder and the Cleveland Cavaliers. He was waived by the Knicks two days later.

On January 10, Thomas returned to the Knicks on a 10-day contract. He later signed a second 10-day contract on January 21, and a rest-of-season deal on January 31.

On March 22, 2015, Thomas scored a career-high 24 points in a 106–89 loss to the Toronto Raptors.

On July 10, 2015, Thomas re-signed with the Knicks. On December 21, 2015, he tied his career high of 24 points in a 107–99 loss to the Orlando Magic.

On July 8, 2016, Thomas again re-signed with the Knicks.

Prior to the start of the 2017–18 season, Thomas was named co-captain of the Knicks alongside Courtney Lee.

On June 29, 2019, he was waived by the Knicks.

=== Brooklyn Nets (2020) ===
On September 27, 2019, Thomas signed with the Brooklyn Nets, but was waived on October 18. On July 14, 2020, the Nets signed Thomas as a substitute player.

== National team career ==
In 2011, Thomas was a member of the US national team that won a bronze medal at the Pan American Games. A year later, Thomas was added to the 2012 USA Men's Select Team roster that trained against the 2012 USA Basketball Men's National Team during its July 6–12 training camp in Las Vegas, Nevada.

== Career statistics ==
Legend
GP	Games played	GS	Games started	MPG	Minutes per game
FG%	Field goal percentage	3P%	3-point field goal percentage	FT%	Free throw percentage
RPG	Rebounds per game	APG	Assists per game	SPG	Steals per game
BPG	Blocks per game	PPG	Points per game	**Bold**	Career high

=== NBA ===
==== Regular season ====
Year	Team	GP	GS	MPG	FG%	3P%	FT%	RPG	APG	SPG	BPG	PPG
2011–12	New Orleans	42	10	15.0	.452	.000	.839	3.0	.3	.2	**.2**	4.0
2012–13	New Orleans	59	9	10.9	**.500**	–	.729	1.9	.3	.2	.1	2.5
2013–14	New Orleans	5	0	8.4	.222	–	.500	1.4	.6	.0	.0	1.2
2014–15	Oklahoma City	22	13	20.5	.357	.000	.697	**3.4**	.9	.5	.0	5.1
2014–15	New York	40	24	**26.0**	.434	.333	.742	3.0	**1.2**	**.7**	**.2**	**8.3**
2015–16	New York	59	5	22.3	.442	.404	.857	2.2	.9	.4	.1	8.2
2016–17	New York	46	15	21.0	.398	**.447**	.843	3.2	.8	.4	.1	6.0
2017–18	New York	**73**	**31**	18.5	.382	.403	.830	2.4	.6	.4	**.2**	4.1
2018–19	New York	46	17	17.0	.396	.278	.750	2.5	.6	.4	**.2**	4.5
2019–20	Brooklyn	7	4	14.0	.348	.308	**1.000**	1.9	.9	.0	.0	3.4
Career		399	128	18.4	.416	.381	.799	2.6	.7	.4	.1	5.1

==== Playoffs ====
Year	Team	GP	GS	MPG	FG%	3P%	FT%	RPG	APG	SPG	BPG	PPG
2020	Brooklyn	3	0	5.7	.200	.000	.500	1.0	.0	.0	.3	1.3
Career		3	0	5.7	.200	.000	.500	1.0	.0	.0	.3	1.3

=== College ===
Year	Team	GP	GS	MPG	FG%	3P%	FT%	RPG	APG	SPG	BPG	PPG
2006–07	Duke	31	18	14.9	.568	–	.593	2.5	.0	.5	.1	4.0
2007–08	Duke	32	28	18.5	.505	–	.521	3.3	.3	**.6**	**.4**	4.3
2008–09	Duke	37	16	18.6	**.626**	–	.553	3.6	.5	.5	.3	**5.3**
2009–10	Duke	**40**	**39**	**25.3**	.439	–	**.743**	**4.9**	**.9**	**.6**	.2	4.8
Career		140	101	19.7	.525	–	.600	3.6	.5	.6	.2	4.6
