= Chris Chiozza =

American basketball player (born 1995)

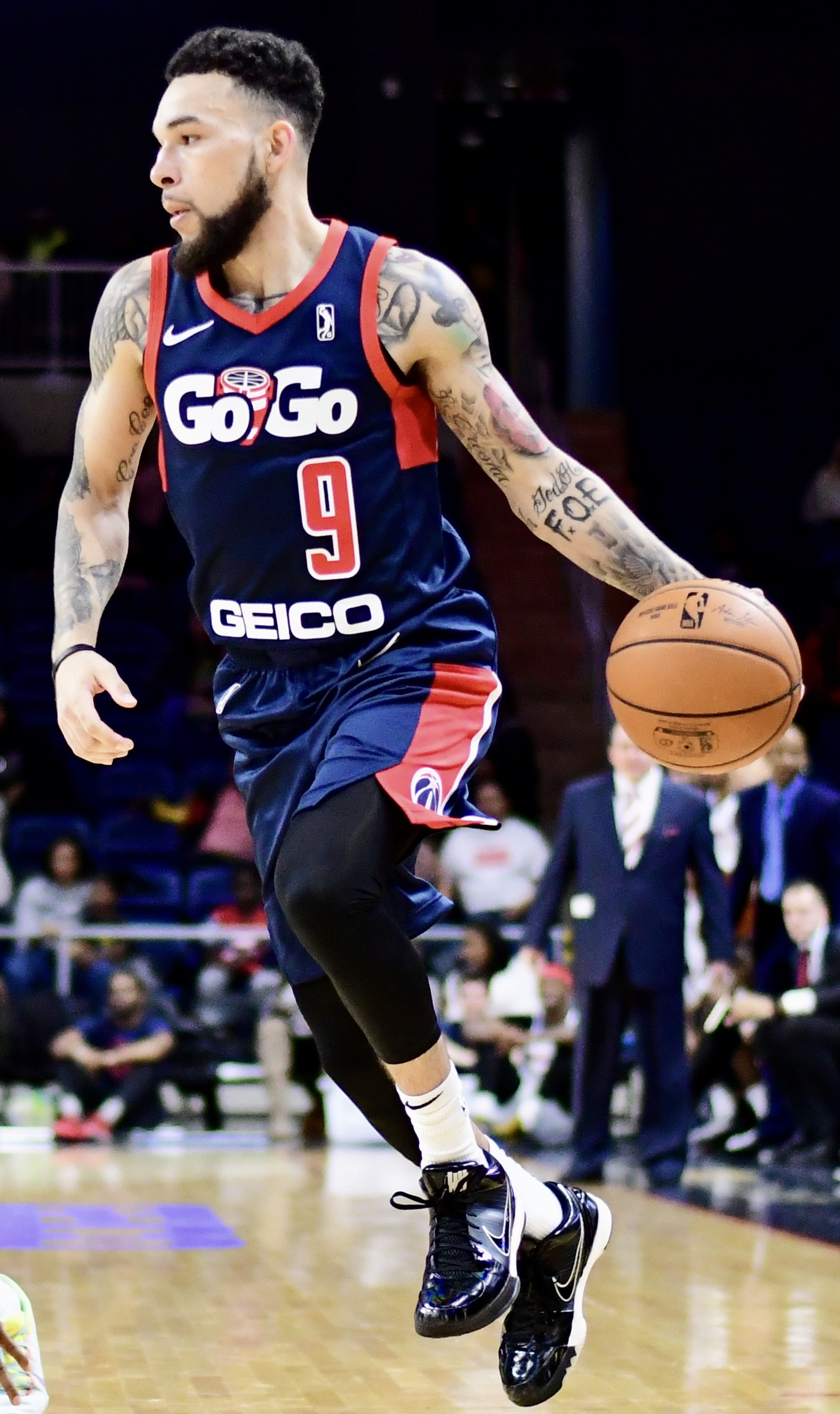
- Chiozza with the Capital City Go-Go in 2019

Free agent
- Position: Point guard

Personal information
- Born: November 21, 1995 (age 30) Memphis, Tennessee, U.S.
- Listed height: 5 ft 11 in (1.80 m)
- Listed weight: 175 lb (79 kg)

Career information
- High school: White Station (Memphis, Tennessee)
- College: Florida (2014–2018)
- NBA draft: 2018: undrafted
- Playing career: 2018–present

Career history
- 2018–2019: Capital City Go-Go
- 2019: Rio Grande Valley Vipers
- 2019: Houston Rockets
- 2019: Washington Wizards
- 2019: →Capital City Go-Go
- 2019–2020: Capital City Go-Go
- 2020–2021: Brooklyn Nets
- 2020–2021: →Long Island Nets
- 2021–2022: Golden State Warriors
- 2021–2022: →Santa Cruz Warriors
- 2022–2023: Long Island Nets
- 2023: UCAM Murcia
- 2023–2024: Saski Baskonia
- 2024–2025: Manisa Basket
- 2025: Karşıyaka Basket
- 2026: Cantù

Career highlights
- NBA champion (2022); All-NBA G League Third Team (2023); First-team All-SEC (2018)
- Stats at NBA.com
- Stats at Basketball Reference

Christopher Xavier Chiozza (/tʃiˈoʊzə/ chee-OH-zə; born November 21, 1995) is an American professional basketball player who last played for Pallacanestro Cantù of the Lega Basket Serie A (LBA). He played college basketball for the Florida Gators. Chiozza won an NBA championship with the Warriors in 2022.

== High school career ==
Chiozza attended White Station High School, where he was coached by Jesus Patino. He also played on the Team Thad AAU team. As a junior, in the wake of his grandmother's death, he posted averages of 27 points, seven assists and seven steals in an important Pittsburgh tournament and began to get major college looks. He averaged 15 points and eight assists per game as a senior. Chiozza was ranked No. 45 in his class by Rivals.com and received scholarship offers from Auburn, UMass, Memphis, Ohio State, Richmond and Tennessee before committing to Florida.

== College career ==
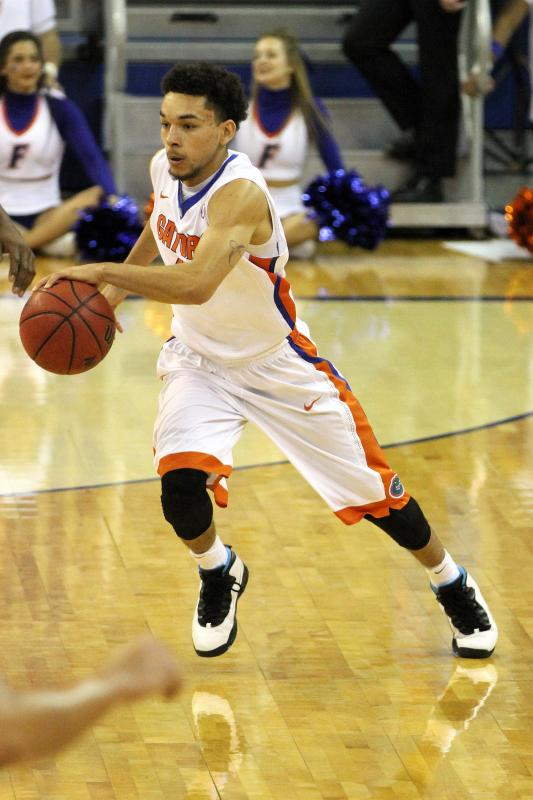
Chiozza playing for Florida

Playing for Florida in the Sweet Sixteen of the 2017 NCAA tournament, Chiozza hit a 3-pointer at the buzzer to defeat Wisconsin 84–83 in overtime and advance to the Elite Eight. He was thinking of passing but ended up taking the winning shot. As a junior he averaged 7.2 points, 3.8 assists and 3.3 rebounds per game.

Chiozza became a starter as a senior and led the SEC with a 3.22 assist-to-turnover ratio. He had a last-second steal and layup to beat Missouri on January 6, 2018. On March 3, he broke Erving Walker's Florida assists record. On the season he averaged 11.1 points, 6.1 assists and 4.6 rebounds per game. At the conclusion of the regular season he was named to the First Team All-SEC. After the season he was invited to the 2018 Portsmouth Invitational Tournament.

== Professional career ==
=== Capital City Go-Go (2018–2019) ===
After going undrafted in the 2018 NBA draft, Chiozza joined the Washington Wizards for the 2018 NBA Summer League. Chiozza would eventually join the Wizards for training camp. He was waived by the Wizards on October 14, 2018, He was added to the team's NBA G League affiliate, the Capital City Go-Go.

=== Houston Rockets (2019) ===
On February 22, 2019, Chiozza signed a 10-day contract with the Houston Rockets. He did not appear in any games, but he subsequently played for the Rockets' G League affiliate, the Rio Grande Valley Vipers.

On March 22, Chiozza signed a contract for the remainder of the 2018–19 season. He played his first NBA game on March 24, seeing 5 minutes of action in a 113–90 blowout win against the New Orleans Pelicans.

On July 30, 2019, Chiozza was waived by the Houston Rockets.

=== Washington Wizards (2019–2020) ===
On September 26, 2019, Chiozza re-signed with the Washington Wizards for training camp. He was signed to a two-way contract by the Wizards on October 21. Under the terms of the deal, Chiozza would split time between the Wizards and their G League affiliate, the Capital City Go-Go. On December 17, 2019, the Wizards waived Chiozza. On December 21, 2019, the Capital City Go-Go announced that they had re-acquired Chiozza.

=== Brooklyn Nets (2020–2021) ===
On January 4, 2020, the Brooklyn Nets signed Chiozza to a two-way contract. On December 1, Chiozza re-signed with the Nets. He was waived at the conclusion of training camp, but was then re-signed on December 22.

=== Golden State Warriors (2021–2022) ===
On August 14, 2021, the Golden State Warriors signed Chiozza to a two-way contract. On June 16, 2022, Chiozza won the 2022 NBA Finals with the Golden State Warriors of the NBA., receiving his championship ring on July 19, 2023 at the Warriors practice facility.

=== Long Island Nets (2022–2023) ===
On September 16, 2022, Chiozza signed with the Brooklyn Nets, who waived him at the end of training camp. On November 4, 2022, Chiozza was named to the opening night roster for the Long Island Nets.

At the end of the 2022-2023 season, he was named to the USBasket.com All NBA G League Third Team.

=== UCAM Murcia (2023) ===
On April 4, 2023, Chiozza signed with UCAM Murcia of the Liga ACB.

=== Baskonia Vitoria-Gasteiz (2024) ===
On November 1, 2023, he signed with Baskonia Vitoria-Gasteiz of the Liga ACB.

=== Valencia Basket (2024) ===
On June 25, 2024, he signed with Valencia Basket of Liga ACB.

=== Manisa Basket (2024–2025) ===
On October 28, 2024, Chiozza signed with Manisa Basket of the Basketbol Süper Ligi (BSL).

=== Karşıyaka Basket (2025) ===
On August 13, 2025, Chiozza signed with Karşıyaka Basket of the Basketbol Süper Ligi (BSL).

=== Pallacanestro Cantù (2026) ===
On January 6, 2026, Chiozza signed with Cantù of Italian Lega Basket Serie A (LBA).

== National team career ==
On February 12, 2019, it was announced that Chiozza was included in FIBA Basketball World Cup qualifying training camp roster for Team USA by the USA Basketball. However, he did not play due to injury. He was named to the roster again for the 2023 FIBA Basketball World Cup Americas qualifiers, averaging 3.5 points, 4 rebounds, and 5.5 assists in two contests.

== Career statistics ==
Legend
GP	Games played	GS	Games started	MPG	Minutes per game
FG%	Field-goal percentage	3P%	3-point field-goal percentage	FT%	Free-throw percentage
RPG	Rebounds per game	APG	Assists per game	SPG	Steals per game
BPG	Blocks per game	PPG	Points per game	PIR	Performance index rating
**Bold**	Career high

=== NBA ===
†	Denotes seasons in which Chiozza won the NBA Championship

==== Regular season ====
Year	Team	GP	GS	MPG	FG%	3P%	FT%	RPG	APG	SPG	BPG	PPG
2018–19	Houston	7	0	4.7	.250	.400	—	.6	.6	.1	.1	.9
2019–20	Washington	10	0	12.3	.294	**.443**	—	1.5	2.8	.1	.2	2.7
2019–20	Brooklyn	18	**2**	**15.4**	**.425**	.357	**1.000**	**2.1**	**3.1**	**.6**	.1	**6.4**
2020–21	Brooklyn	22	1	10.5	.352	.310	.765	1.1	3.0	.3	**.3**	4.0
2021–22†	Golden State	**34**	1	10.9	.296	.321	.667	1.1	1.9	.4	—	2.0
Career		91	4	11.4	.353	.343	.800	1.3	2.4	.5	.1	3.3

==== Playoffs ====
Year	Team	GP	GS	MPG	FG%	3P%	FT%	RPG	APG	SPG	BPG	PPG
2020	Brooklyn	4	0	**16.3**	**.313**	**.333**	**.500**	**1.5**	**1.5**	**1.3**	—	**5.8**
2021	Brooklyn	**6**	0	3.2	.286	**.333**	—	.2	.2	.2	—	.8
Career		10	0	8.4	.323	.316	.500	.7	1.8	.6	—	2.8

=== EuroLeague ===
Year	Team	GP	GS	MPG	FG%	3P%	FT%	RPG	APG	SPG	BPG	PPG	PIR
2023–24	Baskonia	26	2	10.3	.300	.206	.700	1.0	2.5	.5	.1	1.9	2.6
Career		26	2	10.3	.300	.206	.700	1.0	2.5	.5	.1	1.9	2.6

=== Basketball Champions League ===
Year	Team	GP	GS	MPG	FG%	3P%	FT%	RPG	APG	SPG	BPG	PPG
2022–23	UCAM Murcia	1	0	21.9	.600	.500	—	2.0	2.0	1.0	—	8.0
Career		1	0	21.9	.600	.500	—	2.0	2.0	1.0	—	8.0

=== Domestic leagues ===
Year	Team	League	GP	MPG	FG%	3P%	FT%	RPG	APG	SPG	BPG	PPG
2018–19	(United States) Capital City Go-Go	G League	43	33.6	.436	.418	.777	4.7	7.2	1.9	.2	13.6
2018–19	(United States) R.G. Valley Vipers	G League	4	32.0	.467	.318	.500	4.7	13.2	2.0	—	9.5
2019–20	(United States) Capital City Go-Go	G League	10	31.1	.333	.328	1.000	3.7	6.4	2.7	.2	10.8
2019–20	(United States) Long Island Nets	G League	10	31.8	.432	.288	.688	5.6	5.6	1.9	.6	13.3
2021–22	(United States) Santa Cruz Warriors	G League	3	37.0	.346	.281	1.000	7.3	10.0	2.3	—	16.3
2022–23	(United States) Long Island Nets	G League	30	32.8	.452	.435	.737	4.8	8.1	1.9	.3	12.2
2022–23	(Spain) UCAM Murcia	ACB	8	23.8	.338	.320	.786	3.5	5.4	.6	—	9.9
2023–24	(Spain) Baskonia	ACB	21	11.7	.450	.314	1.000	1.2	2.6	.4	—	3.6

=== College ===
Year	Team	GP	GS	MPG	FG%	3P%	FT%	RPG	APG	SPG	BPG	PPG
2014–15	Florida	33	11	22.8	.389	.323	.477	2.2	2.2	1.2	—	3.9
2015–16	Florida	**36**	22	23.8	.344	.320	.797	2.9	4.3	1.1	**.1**	7.2
2016–17	Florida	**36**	0	22.1	.411	.313	.788	3.3	3.8	1.3	—	7.2
2017–18	Florida	34	**32**	**32.0**	**.417**	**.349**	**.809**	**4.3**	**6.1**	**1.9**	**.1**	**11.1**
Career		139	65	25.1	.391	.327	.747	3.2	4.1	1.4	.1	7.4
