= 2018–19 Philadelphia 76ers season =

Season of National Basketball Association team the Philadelphia 76ers

- Head coach: Brett Brown
- General manager: Elton Brand
- Owners: Josh Harris
- Arena: Wells Fargo Center

Results
- Record: 51–31 (.622)
- Place: Division: 2nd (Atlantic); Conference: 3rd (Eastern)
- Playoff finish: Conference Semifinals (lost to Raptors 3–4)
- Stats at Basketball Reference

Local media
- Television: NBCSPHI, NBCSPHI+, 6ABC
- Radio: WPEN

The 2018–19 Philadelphia 76ers season was the 70th season of the franchise in the National Basketball Association (NBA).

In the 2017–18 season, the 76ers were led by Joel Embiid, who played in his first All-Star Game, and 2018 Rookie of The Year Ben Simmons. During the season, the team made some major trades. In November, they traded Dario Saric, Robert Covington, Jerryd Bayless, and a 2022 second-round pick for disgruntled Timberwolves star Jimmy Butler as well as backup center Justin Patton. Then just before the trade deadline, they acquired Tobias Harris, Boban Marjanovic, and Mike Scott in exchange for rookie 1st-round pick Landry Shamet, Wilson Chandler, Mike Muscala, the Sixers' own 2020 first-round pick, and the Miami Heat's unprotected first-round pick in 2021, along with two second-round picks in 2021 and 2023. Finally, they sent away former #1 overall selection Markelle Fultz to the Orlando Magic for Jonathon Simmons, and a first and second-round pick. The 76ers would win one less game then the previous year, going 51–31, and clinching the 3rd seed playoff spot for the second consecutive season.

In the playoffs, the 76ers defeated the Brooklyn Nets in the first round in five games. They ultimately lost to the eventual NBA champion Toronto Raptors in the Eastern Conference semifinals in seven games due to a Kawhi Leonard buzzer beater in Game 7, which gave the Raptors a 92–90 victory.

== Draft picks ==
Round	Pick	Player	Position(s)	Nationality	College / Club
1	16	Zhaire Smith	SG	United States	Texas Tech
1	26	Landry Shamet	SG	United States	Wichita State
2	54	Shake Milton	PG	United States	Southern Methodist

Entering the 2018 NBA Draft, the 76ers had two first-round picks and four second-round pick. Their top selection was previously acquired through a three-way trade involving the Milwaukee Bucks and Phoenix Suns, with the Suns trading away the Los Angeles Lakers' selection (which was previously protected from 2015 to 2017 before ending up at #10) in exchange for Brandon Knight, while Philadelphia traded Michael Carter-Williams to Milwaukee, joining Tyler Ennis and Miles Plumlee. Their other first-round pick would be their own selection, which rose up as high as #26 thanks to their 17-game winning streak ending the previous season. Philadelphia also acquired two straight selections in the second round at #38 & #39 through trades with the Brooklyn Nets and New York Knicks (for selections that were possibly going to be from the Cleveland Cavaliers and Los Angeles Clippers) respectively. Furthermore, the 76ers held two of the last five picks of the 2018 NBA Draft, with the #56 selection being their own and the last pick of the draft being from the Houston Rockets as a part of Houston's ultimate blockbuster trade to acquire Chris Paul from the Los Angeles Clippers. By the end of the night, their number of selection were cut in half.

Originally, the 76ers selected local small forward Mikal Bridges from Villanova University with the #10 pick of the draft. However, the 76ers would trade Bridges to the Phoenix Suns (thereby returning that selection from their 2012 Steve Nash trade back to them) in exchange for the Miami Heat's unprotected 2021 first-round pick and the 16th pick of the draft, which became shooting guard Zhaire Smith from Texas Tech University. Despite starting out the previous season as a less-than-highly regarded prospect, Smith grew his game to be one of the more highly regarded players of the season, as well as a key reason for Texas Tech's journey into the Elite 8. In 37 games played for Texas Tech (21 of which he started in), he averaged 11.3 points (on .556 overall shooting and a .450 three-point percentage), 5 rebounds, 1.8 assists, 1.1 steals, and 1.1 blocks per game, which resulted in him earning spots on both the Big 12 All-Defensive Team and Big 12 All-Newcomer Team. Next, with their original first-round pick at #26, Philadelphia selected shooting guard Landry Shamet from Wichita State University. Shamet was a redshirted sophomore who was previously the MVC Freshman of The Year and an All-MVC First Team member in his redshirted freshman year before a conference change lead to him being a member of the All-ACC First Team in his last season at Wichita State. During that season, Shamet averaged 14.9 points (on .489 shooting percentages with a very good .442 three-point percentage), 5.2 assists, 3.2 rebounds, and 0.7 steals in 31.7 minutes per game throughout 32 games played and stated.

As for their second-round picks, all of their original selections there would be traded. With the 38th pick (which became point guard Khyri Thomas from Creighton University), Philadelphia traded that selection to the Detroit Pistons in exchange for two future second-round picks. A selection later, the 76ers traded the German small forward Isaac Bonga to the Los Angeles Lakers in exchange for the Chicago Bulls' 2019 second-round pick and cash considerations. Finally, with their last two second-round picks (which became power forward Ray Spalding from Louisville University and Greek combo forward Kostas Antetokounmpo (brother of player Giannis Antetokounmpo) from Dayton University respectively), they would trade both of those second rounders to the Dallas Mavericks in exchange for Dallas' original last second-round pick, which was Southern Methodist University point guard Shake Milton at the 54th pick. Throughout his time at Southern Methodist, Milton earned an honor for each season played there, with an All-ACC Rookie Team spot being acquired in his freshman year, and two All-ACC Second Team spots acquired during both his sophomore and junior years respectively. During his last season there, Milton recorded 18 points (on .449 overall shooting percentages with a very good .434 three-point percentage), 4.7 rebounds, 4.4 assists, 1.4 steals, and 0.6 blocks in 36.4 minutes per game throughout 22 games played and started before ending his season prematurely with a hand injury.

== Game log ==
=== Preseason ===
2018 pre-season game log
Total: 3–1 (home: 3–1; road: 0–0)
Pre-season: 3–1 (home: 3–1; road: 0–0)

Game	Date	Team	Score	High points	High rebounds	High assists	Location Attendance	Record
1	September 28	Melbourne	104–84	Embiid (20)	Embiid (13)	Simmons (16)	Wells Fargo Center; 20,318	1–0
2	October 1	Orlando	120–114	Embiid (21)	Embiid, Muscala (7)	Simmons (7)	Wells Fargo Center; 12,005	2–0
3	October 5	Dallas	120–114	Redick (28)	Embiid (10)	Simmons (10)	Mercedes-Benz Arena; 15,992	3–0
4	October 8	Dallas	112–115	Embiid (29)	Simmons (9)	Simmons, Redick (6)	Shenzhen Universiade Sports Centre; 17,396	0–0

2018–19 season schedule

=== Regular season ===
2018–19 game log
Total: 51–31 (home: 31–10; road: 20–21)
October: 4–4 (home: 4–0; road: 0–4)

Game	Date	Team	Score	High points	High rebounds	High assists	Location Attendance	Record
1	October 16	@ Boston	L 87–105	Joel Embiid (23)	Ben Simmons (15)	Ben Simmons (8)	TD Garden; 18,624	0–1
2	October 18	Chicago	W 127–108	Joel Embiid (30)	Ben Simmons (13)	Ben Simmons (11)	Wells Fargo Center; 20,302	1–1
3	October 20	Orlando	W 116–115	Joel Embiid (32)	Joel Embiid (10)	Markelle Fultz (7)	Wells Fargo Center; 20,300	2–1
4	October 23	@ Detroit	L 132–133 (OT)	Joel Embiid (33)	Joel Embiid (11)	T. J. McConnell (8)	Little Caesars Arena; 14,418	2–2
5	October 24	@ Milwaukee	L 108–123	Joel Embiid (30)	Joel Embiid (19)	Ben Simmons (11)	Fiserv Forum; 17,341	2–3
6	October 27	Charlotte	W 105–103	Joel Embiid (27)	Joel Embiid (14)	Markelle Fultz (4)	Wells Fargo Center; 20,203	3–3
7	October 29	Atlanta	W 113–92	Ben Simmons (21)	Ben Simmons (12)	Ben Simmons (9)	Wells Fargo Center; 20,269	4–3
8	October 30	@ Toronto	L 112–129	Joel Embiid (31)	Joel Embiid (11)	Ben Simmons (10)	Scotiabank Arena; 19,800	4–4

November : 12–4 (home: 8–1; road: 4–3)

Game	Date	Team	Score	High points	High rebounds	High assists	Location Attendance	Record
9	November 1	L.A. Clippers	W 122–113	Joel Embiid (41)	Joel Embiid (13)	Ben Simmons (11)	Wells Fargo Center; 20,246	5–4
10	November 3	Detroit	W 109–99	Joel Embiid (39)	Joel Embiid (17)	Ben Simmons (5)	Wells Fargo Center; 20,289	6–4
11	November 4	@ Brooklyn	L 97–122	Ben Simmons (20)	Joel Embiid (15)	Joel Embiid (4)	Barclays Center; 12,826	6–5
12	November 7	@ Indiana	W 100–94	Joel Embiid (20)	Embiid, Simmons (10)	Ben Simmons (8)	Bankers Life Fieldhouse; 16,434	7–5
13	November 9	Charlotte	W 133–132 (OT)	Joel Embiid (42)	Joel Embiid (18)	Ben Simmons (13)	Wells Fargo Center; 20,424	8–5
14	November 10	@ Memphis	L 106–112 (OT)	JJ Redick (20)	Joel Embiid (16)	T. J. McConnell (7)	FedExForum; 16,904	8–6
15	November 12	@ Miami	W 124–114	Joel Embiid (35)	Joel Embiid (18)	Ben Simmons (7)	American Airlines Arena; 19,600	9–6
16	November 14	@ Orlando	L 106–111	JJ Redick (22)	Joel Embiid (13)	Joel Embiid (10)	Amway Center; 15,921	9–7
17	November 16	Utah	W 113–107	Jimmy Butler (28)	Ben Simmons (8)	Ben Simmons (8)	Wells Fargo Center; 20,485	10–7
18	November 17	@ Charlotte	W 122–119 (OT)	Joel Embiid (33)	Embiid, Simmons (11)	Ben Simmons (9)	Spectrum Center; 19,426	11–7
19	November 19	Phoenix	W 119–114	Joel Embiid (33)	Joel Embiid (17)	Ben Simmons (9)	Wells Fargo Center; 20,459	12–7
20	November 21	New Orleans	W 121–120	Joel Embiid (31)	Joel Embiid (19)	Ben Simmons (7)	Wells Fargo Center; 20,352	13–7
21	November 23	Cleveland	L 112–121	Joel Embiid (24)	Joel Embiid (12)	Ben Simmons (10)	Wells Fargo Center; 19,432	13–8
22	November 25	@ Brooklyn	W 127–125	Jimmy Butler (34)	Butler, Embiid (12)	Ben Simmons (9)	Barclays Center; 15,217	14–8
23	November 28	NY Knicks	W 117–91	Joel Embiid (26)	Joel Embiid (14)	Embiid, Simmons (7)	Wells Fargo Center; 20,274	15–8
24	November 30	Washington	W 123–98	Joel Embiid (16)	Joel Embiid (15)	Ben Simmons (10)	Wells Fargo Center; 20,400	16–8

December : 7–6 (home: 4–2; road: 3–4)

Game	Date	Team	Score	High points	High rebounds	High assists	Location Attendance	Record
25	December 2	Memphis	W 103–95	JJ Redick (24)	Joel Embiid (14)	Ben Simmons (6)	Wells Fargo Center; 20,334	17–8
26	December 5	@ Toronto	L 102–113	Jimmy Butler (38)	Joel Embiid (12)	Ben Simmons (11)	Scotiabank Arena; 19,800	17–9
27	December 7	@ Detroit	W 117–111	Jimmy Butler (38)	Joel Embiid (14)	Jimmy Butler, Simmons (6)	Little Caesars Arena; 15,680	18–9
28	December 10	Detroit	W 116–102	Joel Embiid (24)	Ben Simmons (10)	Ben Simmons (7)	Wells Fargo Center; 20,199	19–9
29	December 12	Brooklyn	L 124–127	Joel Embiid (33)	Joel Embiid (17)	Ben Simmons (7)	Wells Fargo Center; 20,376	19–10
30	December 14	Indiana	L 101–113	Joel Embiid (40)	Joel Embiid (21)	T. J. McConnell (5)	Wells Fargo Center; 20,337	19–11
31	December 16	@ Cleveland	W 128–105	Ben Simmons (22)	Ben Simmons (11)	Ben Simmons (14)	Quicken Loans Arena; 19,432	20–11
32	December 17	@ San Antonio	L 96–123	Redick, Simmons (16)	Joel Embiid (11)	Ben Simmons (6)	AT&T Center; 17,486	20–12
33	December 19	NY Knicks	W 131–109	Joel Embiid (20)	Ben Simmons (11)	Ben Simmons (10)	Wells Fargo Center; 20,424	21–12
34	December 22	Toronto	W 126–101	Joel Embiid (27)	Ben Simmons (12)	Ben Simmons (8)	Wells Fargo Center; 20,691	22–12
35	December 25	@ Boston	L 114–121 (OT)	Joel Embiid (34)	Joel Embiid (16)	Ben Simmons (8)	TD Garden; 18,624	22–13
36	December 27	@ Utah	W 114–97	JJ Redick (24)	Joel Embiid (15)	Ben Simmons (12)	Vivint Smart Home Arena; 18,306	23–13
37	December 30	@ Portland	L 95–129	Ben Simmons (19)	Jonah Bolden (8)	Jimmy Butler (6)	Moda Center; 19,393	23–14

January : 11–4 (home: 5–2; road: 6–2)

Game	Date	Team	Score	High points	High rebounds	High assists	Location Attendance	Record
38	January 1	@ L.A. Clippers	W 119–113	Joel Embiid (28)	Joel Embiid (19)	Ben Simmons (8)	Staples Center; 17,868	24–14
39	January 2	@ Phoenix	W 132–127	Joel Embiid (28)	Joel Embiid (19)	Ben Simmons (6)	Talking Stick Resort Arena; 15,226	25–14
40	January 5	Dallas	W 106–100	Joel Embiid (25)	Ben Simmons (14)	Ben Simmons (11)	Wells Fargo Center; 20,656	26–14
41	January 8	Washington	W 132–115	Landry Shamet (29)	Joel Embiid (10)	Ben Simmons (9)	Wells Fargo Center; 20,446	27–14
42	January 9	@ Washington	L 106–123	Joel Embiid (35)	Joel Embiid (14)	Ben Simmons (8)	Capital One Arena; 18,039	27–15
43	January 11	Atlanta	L 121–123	Jimmy Butler (30)	Ben Simmons (10)	Ben Simmons (15)	Wells Fargo Center; 20,487	27–16
44	January 13	@ NY Knicks	W 108–105	Joel Embiid (26)	Ben Simmons (22)	Ben Simmons (9)	Madison Square Garden; 18,596	28–16
45	January 15	Minnesota	W 149–107	Joel Embiid (31)	Joel Embiid (13)	Ben Simmons (9)	Wells Fargo Center; 20,487	29–16
46	January 17	@ Indiana	W 120–96	Jimmy Butler (27)	Joel Embiid (13)	Butler, Embiid, Simmons (8)	Bankers Life Fieldhouse; 16,007	30–16
47	January 19	Oklahoma City	L 115–117	Joel Embiid (31)	Ben Simmons (15)	Ben Simmons (9)	Wells Fargo Center; 20,646	30–17
48	January 21	Houston	W 121–93	Joel Embiid (32)	Embiid, Chandler (14)	Ben Simmons (6)	Wells Fargo Center; 20,313	31–17
49	January 23	San Antonio	W 122–120	Joel Embiid (33)	Ben Simmons (19)	Ben Simmons (15)	Wells Fargo Center; 20,339	32–17
50	January 26	@ Denver	L 110–126	JJ Redick (22)	Ben Simmons (12)	T. J. McConnell (6)	Pepsi Center; 19,673	32–18
51	January 29	@ L.A. Lakers	W 121–105	Joel Embiid (28)	Joel Embiid (11)	Butler, Embiid, Simmons, McConnell (6)	Staples Center; 18,997	33–18
52	January 31	@ Golden State	W 113–104	Embiid, Simmons (26)	Joel Embiid (20)	Butler, Simmons (6)	Oracle Arena; 19,596	34–18

February : 6–4 (home: 3–3; road: 3–1)

Game	Date	Team	Score	High points	High rebounds	High assists	Location Attendance	Record
53	February 2	@ Sacramento	L 108–115	Butler, Embiid (29)	Joel Embiid (17)	Jimmy Butler (7)	Golden 1 Center; 17,586	34–19
54	February 5	Toronto	L 107–119	Joel Embiid (37)	Joel Embiid (13)	Ben Simmons (6)	Wells Fargo Center; 20,472	34–20
55	February 8	Denver	W 117–110	JJ Redick (34)	Joel Embiid (12)	Ben Simmons (6)	Wells Fargo Center; 20,627	35–20
56	February 10	L.A. Lakers	W 143–120	Joel Embiid (37)	Joel Embiid (14)	Ben Simmons (7)	Wells Fargo Center; 20,683	36–20
57	February 12	Boston	L 109–112	Joel Embiid (23)	Joel Embiid (14)	Ben Simmons (5)	Wells Fargo Center; 20,582	36–21
58	February 13	@ NY Knicks	W 126–111	Joel Embiid (23)	Joel Embiid (14)	Jimmy Butler (8)	Madison Square Garden; 18,983	37–21
59	February 21	Miami	W 106–102	Tobias Harris (23)	Boban Marjanović (12)	Jimmy Butler (6)	Wells Fargo Center; 20,505	38–21
60	February 23	Portland	L 115–130	Ben Simmons (29)	Tobias Harris (8)	Ben Simmons (10)	Wells Fargo Center; 20,619	38–22
61	February 25	@ New Orleans	W 111–110	Tobias Harris (29)	Ben Simmons (12)	Jimmy Butler (7)	Smoothie King Center; 17,194	39–22
62	February 28	@ Oklahoma City	W 108–104	Tobias Harris (32)	Ben Simmons (13)	Ben Simmons (11)	Chesapeake Energy Arena; 18,203	40–22

March : 9–5 (home: 6–1; road: 3–4)

Game	Date	Team	Score	High points	High rebounds	High assists	Location Attendance	Record
63	March 2	Golden State	L 117–120	Ben Simmons (25)	Ben Simmons (15)	Ben Simmons (11)	Wells Fargo Center; 20,624	40–23
64	March 5	Orlando	W 114–106	JJ Redick (26)	Ben Simmons (13)	Ben Simmons (8)	Wells Fargo Center; 20,379	41–23
65	March 6	@ Chicago	L 107–108	Jimmy Butler (22)	Ben Simmons (11)	Ben Simmons (7)	United Center; 19,927	41–24
66	March 8	@ Houston	L 91–107	Tobias Harris (22)	Butler, Harris, Simmons (9)	Ben Simmons (10)	Toyota Center; 18,055	41–25
67	March 10	Indiana	W 106–89	Joel Embiid (33)	Joel Embiid (12)	Ben Simmons (6)	Wells Fargo Center; 20,636	42–25
68	March 12	Cleveland	W 106–99	Ben Simmons (26)	Joel Embiid (19)	Ben Simmons (8)	Wells Fargo Center; 20,420	43–25
69	March 15	Sacramento	W 123–114	Jimmy Butler (22)	Joel Embiid (17)	Jimmy Butler (7)	Wells Fargo Center; 20,704	44–25
70	March 17	@ Milwaukee	W 130–125	Joel Embiid (40)	Joel Embiid (15)	Ben Simmons (9)	Fiserv Forum; 18,148	45–25
71	March 19	@ Charlotte	W 118–114	Ben Simmons (28)	Tobias Harris (11)	Jimmy Butler (9)	Spectrum Center; 16,411	46–25
72	March 20	Boston	W 118–115	Joel Embiid (37)	Joel Embiid (22)	Ben Simmons (7)	Wells Fargo Center; 20,606	47–25
73	March 23	@ Atlanta	L 127–129	Joel Embiid (25)	Joel Embiid (12)	Ben Simmons (9)	State Farm Arena; 16,640	47–26
74	March 25	@ Orlando	L 98–119	Joel Embiid (20)	Joel Embiid (10)	Jimmy Butler (7)	Amway Center; 16,848	47–27
75	March 28	Brooklyn	W 123–110	Joel Embiid (39)	Joel Embiid (13)	Ben Simmons (8)	Wells Fargo Center; 20,547	48–27
76	March 30	@ Minnesota	W 118–109	Tobias Harris (25)	Jimmy Butler (13)	Ben Simmons (9)	Target Center; 18,978	49–27

April : 2–4 (home: 1–1; road: 1–3)

Game	Date	Team	Score	High points	High rebounds	High assists	Location Attendance	Record
77	April 1	@ Dallas	L 102–122	Tobias Harris (25)	James Ennis III (8)	Ben Simmons (5)	American Airlines Center; 19,645	49–28
78	April 3	@ Atlanta	L 122–130	JJ Redick (30)	Ben Simmons (15)	Ben Simmons (8)	State Farm Arena; 16,638	49–29
79	April 4	Milwaukee	L 122–128	Joel Embiid (34)	Joel Embiid (13)	Embiid, Simmons (13)	Wells Fargo Center; 20,701	49–30
80	April 6	@ Chicago	W 116–96	JJ Redick (23)	Joel Embiid (10)	Embiid, Harris (5)	United Center; 21,059	50–30
81	April 9	@ Miami	L 99–122	Greg Monroe (18)	Tobias Harris (9)	Jonathon Simmons (8)	American Airlines Arena; 20,153	50–31
82	April 10	Chicago	W 125–109	Jonathon Simmons (20)	Amir Johnson (9)	Marjanovic, McConnell (6)	Wells Fargo Center; 20,197	51–31

2018–19 season schedule

=== Playoffs ===
2019 playoff game log
Total: 7–5 (home: 4–2; road: 3–3)
First Round: 4–1 (home: 2–1; road: 2–0)

Game	Date	Team	Score	High points	High rebounds	High assists	Location Attendance	Series
1	April 13	Brooklyn	L 102–111	Jimmy Butler (36)	Joel Embiid (13)	Tobias Harris (6)	Wells Fargo Center; 20,437	0–1
2	April 15	Brooklyn	W 145–123	Joel Embiid (23)	Simmons, Embiid (10)	Ben Simmons (12)	Wells Fargo Center; 20,591	1–1
3	April 18	@ Brooklyn	W 131–115	Ben Simmons (31)	Tobias Harris (16)	Ben Simmons (9)	Barclays Center; 17,732	2–1
4	April 20	@ Brooklyn	W 112–108	Joel Embiid (31)	Joel Embiid (16)	Ben Simmons (8)	Barclays Center; 17,732	3–1
5	April 23	Brooklyn	W 122–100	Joel Embiid (23)	Joel Embiid (13)	T. J. McConnell (7)	Wells Fargo Center; 20,595	4–1

Conference Semifinals: 3–4 (home: 2–1; road: 1–3)

Game	Date	Team	Score	High points	High rebounds	High assists	Location Attendance	Series
1	April 27	@ Toronto	L 95–108	JJ Redick (16)	Tobias Harris (15)	Tobias Harris (6)	Scotiabank Arena; 19,800	0–1
2	April 29	@ Toronto	W 94–89	Jimmy Butler (30)	Butler, Harris (11)	Butler, Embiid, Simmons (5)	Scotiabank Arena; 19,800	1–1
3	May 2	Toronto	W 116–95	Joel Embiid (33)	Joel Embiid (10)	Jimmy Butler (9)	Wells Fargo Center; 20,658	2–1
4	May 5	Toronto	L 96–101	Jimmy Butler (29)	Jimmy Butler (11)	Joel Embiid (7)	Wells Fargo Center; 20,639	2–2
5	May 7	@ Toronto	L 89–125	Jimmy Butler (22)	Ben Simmons (7)	Jimmy Butler (7)	Scotiabank Arena; 20,287	2–3
6	May 9	Toronto	W 112–101	Jimmy Butler (25)	Joel Embiid (12)	Jimmy Butler (8)	Wells Fargo Center; 20,525	3–3
7	May 12	@ Toronto	L 90–92	Joel Embiid (21)	Joel Embiid (11)	Ben Simmons (5)	Scotiabank Arena; 20,917	3–4

2019 playoff schedule

== Standings ==
=== Atlantic division ===
Atlantic Division	W	L	PCT	GB	Home	Road	Div	GP
y – Toronto Raptors	58	24	.707	–	32‍–‍9	26‍–‍15	12–4	82
x – Philadelphia 76ers	51	31	.622	7.0	31‍–‍10	20‍–‍21	8–8	82
x – Boston Celtics	49	33	.598	9.0	28‍–‍13	21‍–‍20	10–6	82
x – Brooklyn Nets	42	40	.512	16.0	23‍–‍18	19‍–‍22	8–8	82
New York Knicks	17	65	.207	41.0	9‍–‍32	8‍–‍33	2–14	82

=== Conference standings ===
Eastern Conference
#	Team	W	L	PCT	GB	GP
1	z – Milwaukee Bucks *	60	22	.732	–	82
2	y – Toronto Raptors *	58	24	.707	2.0	82
3	x – Philadelphia 76ers	51	31	.622	9.0	82
4	x – Boston Celtics	49	33	.598	11.0	82
5	x – Indiana Pacers	48	34	.585	12.0	82
6	x – Brooklyn Nets	42	40	.512	18.0	82
7	y – Orlando Magic *	42	40	.512	18.0	82
8	x – Detroit Pistons	41	41	.500	19.0	82
9	Charlotte Hornets	39	43	.476	21.0	82
10	Miami Heat	39	43	.476	21.0	82
11	Washington Wizards	32	50	.390	28.0	82
12	Atlanta Hawks	29	53	.354	31.0	82
13	Chicago Bulls	22	60	.268	38.0	82
14	Cleveland Cavaliers	19	63	.232	41.0	82
15	New York Knicks	17	65	.207	43.0	82

== Roster ==
2018–19 Philadelphia 76ers roster
Players

Pos.	No.	Player	Height	Weight	DOB	From
F	43	Jonah Bolden	6 ft 10 in (2.08 m)	220 lb (100 kg)	1996–01–02	UCLA
G/F	23	Jimmy Butler	6 ft 8 in (2.03 m)	232 lb (105 kg)	1989–09–14	Marquette
C	21	Joel Embiid	7 ft 0 in (2.13 m)	250 lb (113 kg)	1994–03–16	Kansas
F	11	James Ennis	6 ft 7 in (2.01 m)	210 lb (95 kg)	1990–07–01	Long Beach State
F	33	Tobias Harris	6 ft 9 in (2.06 m)	235 lb (107 kg)	1992–07–15	Tennessee
F	7	Haywood Highsmith (TW)	6 ft 7 in (2.01 m)	220 lb (100 kg)	1996–12–09	Wheeling Jesuit
F	5	Amir Johnson	6 ft 9 in (2.06 m)	240 lb (109 kg)	1987–05–01	Westchester HS (CA)
G/F	30	Furkan Korkmaz	6 ft 7 in (2.01 m)	207 lb (94 kg)	1997–07–24	Turkey
C	51	Boban Marjanović	7 ft 4 in (2.24 m)	290 lb (132 kg)	1988–08–15	Serbia
G	12	T. J. McConnell	6 ft 2 in (1.88 m)	190 lb (86 kg)	1992–03–25	Arizona
G	18	Shake Milton (TW)	6 ft 6 in (1.98 m)	207 lb (94 kg)	1996–09–26	SMU
C	55	Greg Monroe	6 ft 11 in (2.11 m)	265 lb (120 kg)	1990–06–04	Georgetown
G	17	JJ Redick	6 ft 4 in (1.93 m)	200 lb (91 kg)	1984–06–24	Duke
F	1	Mike Scott	6 ft 8 in (2.03 m)	237 lb (108 kg)	1988–07–16	Virginia
G/F	25	Ben Simmons	6 ft 10 in (2.08 m)	230 lb (104 kg)	1996–07–20	LSU
G	14	Jonathon Simmons	6 ft 6 in (1.98 m)	195 lb (88 kg)	1989–09–14	Houston
G	8	Zhaire Smith	6 ft 4 in (1.93 m)	199 lb (90 kg)	1999–06–04	Texas Tech

Coaches
Head coach
- Brett Brown
Assistant(s)
- John Bryant
- Jim O'Brien
- Monty Williams
- Kevin Young
- John Townsend (shooting coach)
- Todd Wright (Assistant/Strength and Conditioning)
- Chris Babcock (Player Development)
- Dwayne Jones (Player Development)
- Tyler Lashbrook Player Development

Legend
- (DP) Unsigned draft pick
- (FA) Free agent
- (S) Suspended
- (GL) On assignment to G League affiliate
- (TW) Two-way affiliate player
- Injured

Roster
Updated: 2019–04–04

== Player statistics ==
=== Regular season ===
Player	Pos.	GP	GS	MP	Reb.	Ast.	Stl.	Blk.	Pts.
Jonah Bolden	PF	44	10	639	165	40	17	39	207
Corey Brewer^{≠}	SF	7	3	140	17	10	12	2	53
Jimmy Butler^{≠}	SF	55	55	1,824	290	220	99	29	1,002
Wilson Chandler^{†}	PF	36	32	951	168	72	22	18	241
Robert Covington^{†}	SF	13	13	440	67	14	24	23	147
Joel Embiid	C	64	64	2,154	871	234	46	122	1,761
James Ennis^{≠}	SF	18	2	281	65	14	3	7	95
Markelle Fultz^{†}	SG	19	15	427	70	59	17	5	155
Tobias Harris^{≠}	PF/SF	27	27	944	213	79	11	13	492
Haywood Highsmith^{≠}	SF	5	0	40	5	2	1	0	9
Demetrius Jackson^{‡}	PG	6	0	39	3	5	2	0	22
Amir Johnson	C	51	6	529	147	60	16	13	201
Furkan Korkmaz	SG	48	7	679	107	52	29	2	279
Boban Marjanović^{≠}	C	22	3	305	113	32	5	10	180
T. J. McConnell	PG	76	3	1,470	174	258	79	17	483
Shake Milton	SG/SF	20	0	268	35	18	8	8	87
Greg Monroe^{≠}	C	3	0	52	13	7	1	0	41
Mike Muscala^{†}	PF	47	6	1,041	200	62	18	27	349
Justin Patton^{‡}	C	3	0	21	6	3	2	0	5
JJ Redick	SG	76	63	2,379	186	206	32	17	1,372
Dario Šarić^{†}	PF	13	13	396	86	26	4	3	144
Mike Scott^{≠}	PF	27	3	647	102	22	9	5	211
Landry Shamet^{†}	SG	54	4	1,108	78	59	24	8	449
Ben Simmons	PG/PF	79	79	2,700	697	610	112	61	1,337
Jonathon Simmons^{≠}	SF	15	0	219	26	33	11	1	83
Zhaire Smith	SG	6	2	111	13	10	2	2	40

After all games.
^{‡}Waived during the season
^{†}Traded during the season
^{≠}Acquired during the season

=== Playoffs ===
Player	Pos.	GP	GS	MP	Reb.	Ast.	Stl.	Blk.	Pts.
Jonah Bolden	PF	10	0	79	14	3	2	1	16
Jimmy Butler	SF	12	12	421	73	62	17	7	233
Joel Embiid	C	11	11	334	115	37	8	25	222
James Ennis	SF	11	0	232	42	12	4	3	83
Tobias Harris	PF/SF	12	12	443	109	48	13	6	186
Amir Johnson	C	4	0	20	5	2	1	0	8
Furkan Korkmaz	SG	4	0	36	6	5	0	1	19
Boban Marjanović	C	11	0	105	36	11	2	3	64
T. J. McConnell	PG	9	0	75	6	11	2	1	24
Greg Monroe	C	10	1	90	31	4	5	4	40
JJ Redick	SG	12	12	376	17	19	1	3	161
Mike Scott	PF	10	0	193	34	5	3	0	56
Ben Simmons	PG/PF	12	12	421	85	72	15	12	167
Jonathon Simmons	SF	7	0	52	9	2	1	0	25
Zhaire Smith	SG	2	0	5	0	0	1	0	0

== Transactions ==
=== Trades ===
June 21, 2018	To Philadelphia 76ers Draft rights to Zhaire Smith; 2021 Miami first-round pick	To Phoenix Suns Draft rights to Mikal Bridges
June 21, 2018	To Philadelphia 76ers Two future second-round picks	To Detroit Pistons Draft rights to Khyri Thomas
June 21, 2018	To Philadelphia 76ers Draft rights to Shake Milton	To Dallas Mavericks Draft rights to Ray Spalding; Draft rights to Kostas Antetokounmpo
July 6, 2018	To Philadelphia 76ers 2019 second-round pick Cash considerations	To Los Angeles Lakers Draft rights to Isaac Bonga
July 6, 2018	To Philadelphia 76ers Wilson Chandler; Future second-round pick	To Denver Nuggets Cash considerations
July 20, 2018	To Philadelphia 76ers Cash considerations	To Phoenix Suns Richaun Holmes
July 25, 2018	To Philadelphia 76ers Mike Muscala (from Atlanta)	To Atlanta Hawks Carmelo Anthony (from Oklahoma City); Justin Anderson (from Philadelphia); 2022 protected first-round pick (from Oklahoma City)
July 25, 2018	To Oklahoma City Thunder Dennis Schröder (from Atlanta); Timothé Luwawu-Cabarrot (from Philadelphia)
November 12, 2018	To Philadelphia 76ers Jimmy Butler; Justin Patton	To Minnesota Timberwolves Robert Covington; Dario Šarić; Jerryd Bayless; 2022 second-round pick
February 6, 2019	To Philadelphia 76ers Tobias Harris; Boban Marjanovic; Mike Scott	To Los Angeles Clippers Wilson Chandler; Mike Muscala; Landry Shamet; 2020 protected first-round pick 2021 unprotected first-round pick 2021 second-round pick (from Miami); 2023 second-round pick (from Detroit)
February 6, 2019	To Philadelphia 76ers Malachi Richardson; Draft rights to Emir Preldžić; 2022 Toronto second-round pick	To Toronto Raptors Cash considerations

=== Free agents ===
==== Re-signed ====
Player	Signed
JJ Redick	July 6, 2018
Amir Johnson	July 16, 2018
Demetrius Jackson	July 27, 2018

==== Additions ====
Player	Signed	Former Team
Shake Milton	Two-way contract	SMU Mustangs
Norvel Pelle	August 3, 2018	(Italy) Fiat Torino
Anthony Brown	August 29, 2018	Minnesota Timberwolves/Iowa Wolves

==== Subtractions ====
Player	Reason Left	New Team
Ersan İlyasova	Free Agency	Milwaukee Bucks
Marco Belinelli	Free Agency	San Antonio Spurs
