= Zhaire Smith =

American basketball player (born 1999)

No. 40 – Oklahoma City Blue
- Position: Shooting guard
- League: NBA G League

Personal information
- Born: June 4, 1999 (age 27) Garland, Texas, U.S.
- Listed height: 6 ft 4 in (1.93 m)
- Listed weight: 205 lb (93 kg)

Career information
- High school: Lakeview Centennial (Garland, Texas)
- College: Texas Tech (2017–2018)
- NBA draft: 2018: 1st round, 16th overall pick
- Drafted by: Phoenix Suns
- Playing career: 2018–present

Career history
- 2018–2020: Philadelphia 76ers
- 2019–2020: →Delaware Blue Coats
- 2023–2025: Cleveland Charge
- 2025: Texas Legends
- 2025–present: Oklahoma City Blue
- 2026: Piratas de Quebradillas

Career highlights
- Big 12 All-Defensive Team (2018); Big 12 All-Newcomer Team (2018)
- Stats at NBA.com
- Stats at Basketball Reference

Zhaire Jahi-ihme Smith (born June 4, 1999) is an American professional basketball player for the Oklahoma City Blue of the NBA G League. He played college basketball for Texas Tech before being drafted 16th overall by the Phoenix Suns and traded to the Philadelphia 76ers.

== High school career ==
Smith attended Lakeview Centennial High School, where he was coached by J. T. Locklear. He averaged 20.1 points, 6.6 rebounds and 3.0 assists per game as a senior. Smith earned District 10-6A MVP honors and was voted the best dunker in the Dallas region by area coaches. Coming out of high school, Smith was a three-star recruit and chose Texas Tech over Arkansas, Georgia Tech, Kansas State, Memphis, Oregon, and Texas.

== College career ==
In his freshman season at Texas Tech, he averaged 11.3 points and five rebounds per game. He was an honorable mention Big-12 selection and was named to the conference's All-Defensive team. Alongside Keenan Evans, Smith led Texas Tech to the Elite Eight of the NCAA Tournament, where they lost to eventual champion Villanova. Smith had a career-high 21 points and to go along with eight rebounds, three steals and two assists in a February 7 win over Iowa State. He flirted with a triple-double with 18 points, nine rebounds and seven assists in a 69–66 victory in the Round of 32 of the NCAA Tournament versus Florida, and posted several highlight-reel dunks.

Following the season, he declared for the 2018 NBA draft without initially hiring an agent. In late April it was announced that Smith signed with Roc Nation Sports, thus ending his collegiate eligibility.

== Professional career ==
=== Philadelphia 76ers (2018–2020) ===
On June 21, 2018, Smith was selected with the sixteenth overall pick by the Phoenix Suns in the 2018 NBA draft, but was immediately traded, along with the Miami Heat's 2021 first-round pick, to the Philadelphia 76ers for Mikal Bridges. On July 2, he signed with the 76ers. Head coach Brett Brown compared Smith to Kawhi Leonard, who he helped to develop on the San Antonio Spurs, as having played power forward in college and wanting to mold him into a wing player in a similar vein. Smith expressed to reporters that he wore #2 because Leonard was his favorite player.

On August 6, Smith fractured his foot at a summer development camp and required surgery. On August 10, 2018, the surgery to repair an acute Jones fracture of the fifth metatarsal in Smith's left foot was successful.

Just one month later, in September 2018, Smith suffered a nearly fatal allergic reaction after eating Thai Chicken containing sesame. The episode was severe, requiring Smith to be hospitalized and placed on a feeding tube for nearly six weeks, ultimately losing over sixty pounds and a much of his overall strength.

While general manager Elton Brand expressed doubt that he would be able to play for the 76ers in the regular season, Smith opted to remake his jump shot in order to temporarily compensate for his much lower body strength. After successfully doing so, he made his debut with the Delaware Blue Coats for the NBA G League on March 1, 2019, against the Maine Red Claws. He averaged 7.2 points with 3.0 rebounds and 1.5 assists in 11 G-League games with the Blue Coats, starting five.

Smith made his NBA debut on March 25, 2019, in a 119–98 loss to the Orlando Magic, scoring three points with a steal and one rebound in five and a half minutes of play. In his rookie season, Smith averaged 6.7 points, 2.2 rebounds, 1.7 assists and 18.5 minutes played in six games (two starts) including 17 points, four rebounds and five assists when he started the final game of the regular season against the Chicago Bulls. Smith also played in two games during the 2019 NBA Playoffs with the 76ers, albeit with limited production in either game.

On February 27, 2020, Smith had 16 points and six rebounds, shooting 7-for-16 from the floor in a 125–106 loss to the Wisconsin Herd.

On November 23, 2020, Smith was traded to the Detroit Pistons in exchange for Tony Bradley. On November 30, Smith was waived by the Pistons.

On December 15, 2020, Smith signed with the Memphis Grizzlies, but was waived the next day.

Smith was included in the roster of the Memphis Hustle of the NBA G League in 2021 but did not play a game for the team.

=== Cleveland Charge (2023–2025) ===
In July 2023, Smith joined the Oklahoma City Thunder for the 2023 NBA Summer League and on September 15, 2023, Smith signed with the Cleveland Cavaliers. However, he was waived on October 21, and one week later signed with the Cleveland Charge of the NBA G League.

On February 11, 2024, Smith signed a 10-day contract with the Cavaliers, but didn't play for them. On February 23, he returned to the Charge.

On September 24, 2024, Smith signed with the Cavaliers, but was waived on October 19. On October 26, he joined the Charge.

== Career statistics ==
Legend
GP	Games played	GS	Games started	MPG	Minutes per game
FG%	Field goal percentage	3P%	3-point field goal percentage	FT%	Free throw percentage
RPG	Rebounds per game	APG	Assists per game	SPG	Steals per game
BPG	Blocks per game	PPG	Points per game	**Bold**	Career high

=== NBA ===
==== Regular season ====
Year	Team	GP	GS	MPG	FG%	3P%	FT%	RPG	APG	SPG	BPG	PPG
2018–19	Philadelphia	6	**2**	**18.5**	**.412**	**.375**	**.750**	**2.2**	**1.7**	.3	**.3**	**6.7**
2019–20	Philadelphia	**7**	0	4.6	.273	.000	.500	.3	.3	**.4**	.0	1.1
Career		13	2	11.0	.378	.316	.667	1.2	.9	.4	.2	3.7

==== Playoffs ====
Year	Team	GP	GS	MPG	FG%	3P%	FT%	RPG	APG	SPG	BPG	PPG
2019	Philadelphia	2	0	2.5	—	—	—	.0	.0	.5	.0	.0
Career		2	0	2.5	—	—	—	.0	.0	.5	.0	.0

=== College ===
Year	Team	GP	GS	MPG	FG%	3P%	FT%	RPG	APG	SPG	BPG	PPG
2017–18	Texas Tech	37	21	28.4	.556	.450	.717	5.0	1.8	1.1	1.1	11.3

== Personal life ==
Smith has severe peanut and sesame allergies. He is married to Kassidy Hunter from Lubbock, TX. They married in 2021 and have three children together, two boys and one girl.

Zhaire’s father, Billy Smith, played college basketball and college football for the Kansas State Wildcats.
