= 2018–19 Toronto Raptors season =

2019 NBA Champions

- NBA champions
- Conference champions
- Division champions
- Head coach: Nick Nurse
- President: Masai Ujiri
- General manager: Bobby Webster
- Owners: Maple Leaf Sports & Entertainment
- Arena: Scotiabank Arena

Results
- Record: 58–24 (.707)
- Place: Division: 1st (Atlantic); Conference: 2nd (Eastern)
- Playoff finish: NBA champions (defeated Warriors 4–2)
- Stats at Basketball Reference

Local media
- Television: TSN; Sportsnet; CTV (NBA Playoffs); CTV2 (NBA Finals); Citytv (NBA Finals); RDS (in French)

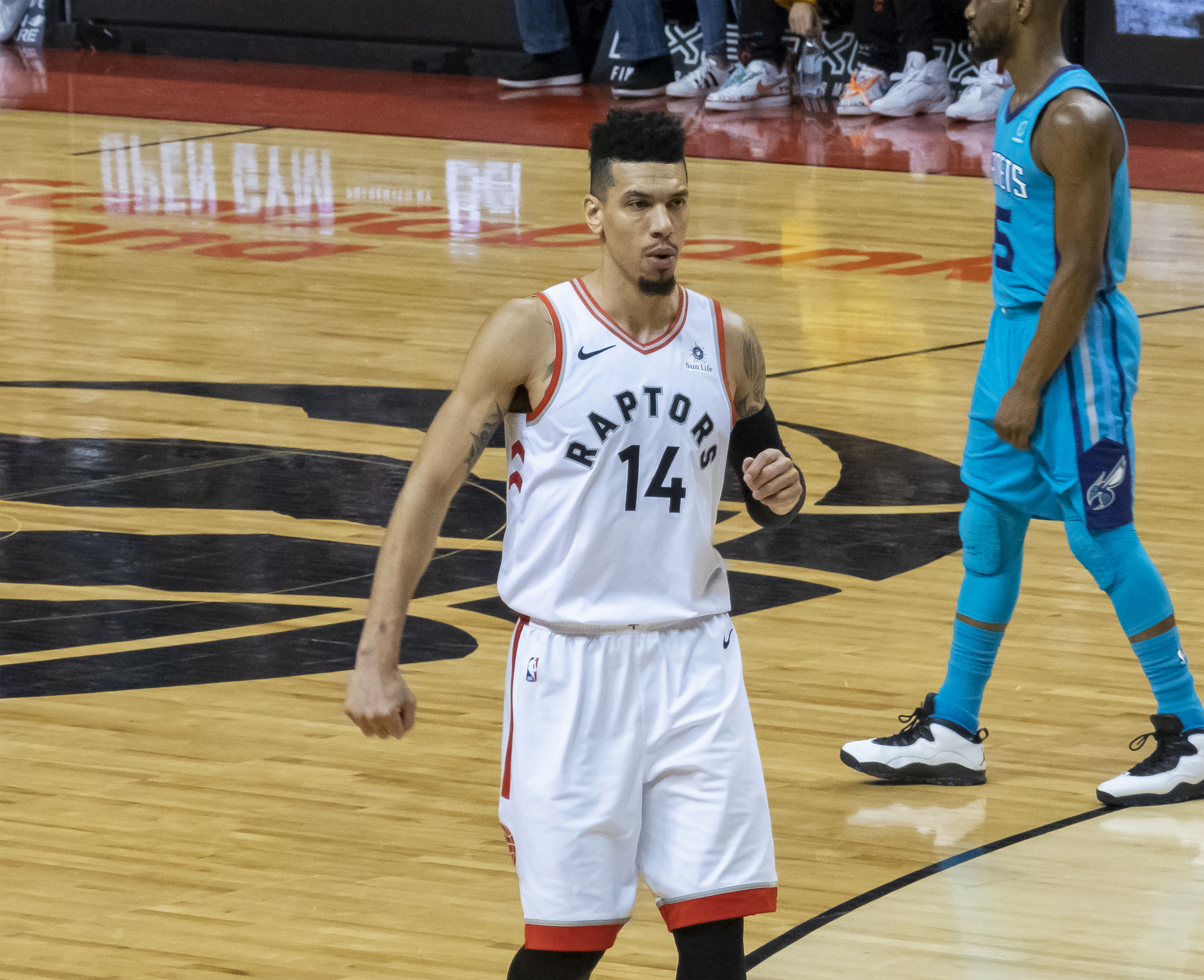
Danny Green playing for Raptors in 2019 against the Charlotte Hornets

The 2018–19 Toronto Raptors season was the 24th season of the franchise in the National Basketball Association (NBA). During the off-season, the Raptors acquired small forward Kawhi Leonard from the San Antonio Spurs after trading franchise star DeMar DeRozan. The season ended with the franchise's first NBA Finals appearance and first NBA championship.

On May 11, 2018, the Raptors fired head coach Dwane Casey after the team was swept by the Cleveland Cavaliers for the second consecutive time in the postseason. On June 14, the Raptors promoted assistant coach Nick Nurse as their head coach. The Raptors played their home games at newly renamed Scotiabank Arena. For the first time since 2008–09, DeMar DeRozan (who spent his first nine seasons in the NBA with the Raptors) did not play for the Raptors, as he was traded, along with Jakob Poeltl and a protected 2019 first-round draft pick, to the San Antonio Spurs for Kawhi Leonard and Danny Green. Later, on February 7, 2019, at the trade deadline, the Memphis Grizzlies traded Marc Gasol to the Raptors for Jonas Valančiūnas, Delon Wright and C. J. Miles. The Raptors later signed Jeremy Lin. The team finished the regular season with a 58–24 record, earning the second seed in the Eastern Conference. They also won their fifth Atlantic Division title in six years. The Raptors were one of two teams to have an offense and defensive rating that both ranked in the top 5 of the NBA.

In the playoffs, the Raptors defeated the Orlando Magic in five games in the first round. They edged the Philadelphia 76ers in seven games in the semifinals to make their first Eastern Conference Finals appearance since 2016, with Kawhi Leonard's buzzer-beater over Joel Embiid giving the Raptors a 92–90 victory in the series-clinching game 7. The Raptors defeated the Milwaukee Bucks in the Eastern Conference Finals 4–2, winning the last four games of the series after being down 0–2 to become the sixth team to overcome that deficit. In the NBA Finals, the Raptors prevailed over the two-time defending NBA champion Golden State Warriors. They beat the Warriors 4–2, becoming the first non-US team to win the NBA title.

== Draft ==
The Raptors did not have a pick in the 2018 NBA draft. They had previously traded their selections to the Brooklyn Nets, who ended up drafting Džanan Musa, and to the Phoenix Suns, who ended up drafting George King.

== Roster ==
2018–19 Toronto Raptors roster
Players

Pos.	No.	Player	Height	Weight	DOB	From
SF	3	OG Anunoby	6 ft 8 in (2.03 m)	232 lb (105 kg)	1997–07–17	Indiana
PF	25	Chris Boucher	6 ft 10 in (2.08 m)	200 lb (91 kg)	1993–01–11	Oregon
C	33	Marc Gasol	7 ft 1 in (2.16 m)	255 lb (116 kg)	1985–01–29	Spain
SG	14	Danny Green	6 ft 6 in (1.98 m)	215 lb (98 kg)	1987–06–22	North Carolina
C	9	Serge Ibaka	7 ft 0 in (2.13 m)	235 lb (107 kg)	1989–09–18	Republic of the Congo
SF	2	Kawhi Leonard	6 ft 7 in (2.01 m)	230 lb (104 kg)	1991–06–29	San Diego State
PG	17	Jeremy Lin	6 ft 3 in (1.91 m)	200 lb (91 kg)	1988–08–23	Harvard
PG	7	Kyle Lowry	6 ft 0 in (1.83 m)	196 lb (89 kg)	1986–03–25	Villanova
G	8	Jordan Loyd (TW)	6 ft 4 in (1.93 m)	210 lb (95 kg)	1993–07–27	Indianapolis
G	1	Patrick McCaw	6 ft 7 in (2.01 m)	185 lb (84 kg)	1995–10–25	UNLV
G	20	Jodie Meeks	6 ft 4 in (1.93 m)	210 lb (95 kg)	1987–08–21	Kentucky
F	13	Malcolm Miller	6 ft 7 in (2.01 m)	210 lb (95 kg)	1993–03–06	Holy Cross
F/C	15	Eric Moreland	6 ft 10 in (2.08 m)	238 lb (108 kg)	1991–12–24	Oregon State
SG	24	Norman Powell	6 ft 4 in (1.93 m)	215 lb (98 kg)	1993–05–25	UCLA
PF	43	Pascal Siakam	6 ft 9 in (2.06 m)	230 lb (104 kg)	1994–04–02	New Mexico State
PG	23	Fred VanVleet	6 ft 0 in (1.83 m)	195 lb (88 kg)	1994–02–25	Wichita State

Coaches
Head coach
- Nick Nurse
Assistant(s)
- Nate Bjorkgren
- Brittni Donaldson
- Adrian Griffin
- Phil Handy
- Eric Khoury
- Alex McKechnie
- Patrick Mutombo
- Jim Sann
- Sergio Scariolo

Legend
- (DP) Unsigned draft pick
- (FA) Free agent
- (S) Suspended
- (GL) On assignment to G League affiliate
- (TW) Two-way affiliate player
- Injured

Roster
Updated: 2019–06–12

== Standings ==
=== Division ===
Atlantic Division	W	L	PCT	GB	Home	Road	Div	GP
y – Toronto Raptors	58	24	.707	–	32‍–‍9	26‍–‍15	12–4	82
x – Philadelphia 76ers	51	31	.622	7.0	31‍–‍10	20‍–‍21	8–8	82
x – Boston Celtics	49	33	.598	9.0	28‍–‍13	21‍–‍20	10–6	82
x – Brooklyn Nets	42	40	.512	16.0	23‍–‍18	19‍–‍22	8–8	82
New York Knicks	17	65	.207	41.0	9‍–‍32	8‍–‍33	2–14	82

=== Conference ===
Eastern Conference
#	Team	W	L	PCT	GB	GP
1	z – Milwaukee Bucks *	60	22	.732	–	82
2	y – Toronto Raptors *	58	24	.707	2.0	82
3	x – Philadelphia 76ers	51	31	.622	9.0	82
4	x – Boston Celtics	49	33	.598	11.0	82
5	x – Indiana Pacers	48	34	.585	12.0	82
6	x – Brooklyn Nets	42	40	.512	18.0	82
7	y – Orlando Magic *	42	40	.512	18.0	82
8	x – Detroit Pistons	41	41	.500	19.0	82
9	Charlotte Hornets	39	43	.476	21.0	82
10	Miami Heat	39	43	.476	21.0	82
11	Washington Wizards	32	50	.390	28.0	82
12	Atlanta Hawks	29	53	.354	31.0	82
13	Chicago Bulls	22	60	.268	38.0	82
14	Cleveland Cavaliers	19	63	.232	41.0	82
15	New York Knicks	17	65	.207	43.0	82

== Game log ==
=== Preseason ===
2018 pre-season game log
Total: 4–1 (Home: 3–0; Road: 1–1)
Pre-season: 4–1 (home: 3–0; road: 1–1)

Game	Date	Team	Score	High points	High rebounds	High assists	Location Attendance	Record
1	September 29	Portland	W 122–104	Valančiūnas (17)	Siakam (13)	Leonard, Siakam, VanVleet (3)	Rogers Arena; 18,654	1–0
2	October 2	@ Utah	L 90–105	Valančiūnas (18)	Siakam, Valančiūnas (9)	VanVleet (3)	Vivint Smart Home Arena; 18,306	1–1
3	October 5	Melbourne	W 120–82	Powell (21)	Ibaka (12)	Wright (5)	Scotiabank Arena; 15,781	2–1
4	October 10	Brooklyn	W 118–91	Green (22)	Leonard, Valančiūnas (7)	Leonard, Lowry (7)	Bell Centre; N/A	3–1
5	October 11	@ New Orleans	W 134–119	Richardson, Siakam (21)	Moreland (12)	Felder, Siakam (6)	Smoothie King Center; 15,047	4–1

2018–19 season schedule

=== Regular season ===
2018–19 game log
Total: 58–24 (Home: 32–9; Road: 26–15)
October: 7–1 (home: 6–0; road: 1–1)

Game	Date	Team	Score	High points	High rebounds	High assists	Location Attendance	Record
1	October 17	Cleveland	W 116–104	Kyle Lowry (27)	Leonard, Valančiūnas (12)	Kyle Lowry (8)	Scotiabank Arena; 19,915	1–0
2	October 19	Boston	W 113–101	Kawhi Leonard (31)	Kawhi Leonard (10)	Fred VanVleet (7)	Scotiabank Arena; 19,800	2–0
3	October 20	@ Washington	W 117–113	Kyle Lowry (28)	Pascal Siakam (10)	Kyle Lowry (12)	Capital One Arena; 16,185	3–0
4	October 22	Charlotte	W 127–106	Kawhi Leonard (22)	Jonas Valančiūnas (10)	Kyle Lowry (14)	Scotiabank Arena; 19,800	4–0
5	October 24	Minnesota	W 112–105	Kawhi Leonard (35)	Jonas Valančiūnas (9)	Kyle Lowry (10)	Scotiabank Arena; 19,800	5–0
6	October 26	Dallas	W 116–107	Kawhi Leonard (21)	Kawhi Leonard (9)	Kyle Lowry (12)	Scotiabank Arena; 19,800	6–0
7	October 29	@ Milwaukee	L 109–124	Serge Ibaka (30)	Serge Ibaka (9)	Kyle Lowry (15)	Fiserv Forum; 17,341	6–1
8	October 30	Philadelphia	W 129–112	Kawhi Leonard (31)	Pascal Siakam (15)	Kyle Lowry (12)	Scotiabank Arena; 19,800	7–1

November: 12–3 (home: 4–2; road: 8–1)

Game	Date	Team	Score	High points	High rebounds	High assists	Location Attendance	Record
9	November 2	@ Phoenix	W 107–98	Kawhi Leonard (19)	Jonas Valančiūnas (7)	Kyle Lowry (12)	Talking Stick Resort Arena; 15,843	8–1
10	November 4	@ L.A. Lakers	W 121–107	Serge Ibaka (34)	Pascal Siakam (13)	Kyle Lowry (15)	Staples Center; 18,997	9–1
11	November 5	@ Utah	W 124–111	Anunoby, Ibaka, Lowry, VanVleet (17)	Lowry, Siakam (7)	Kyle Lowry (11)	Vivint Smart Home Arena; 18,306	10–1
12	November 7	@ Sacramento	W 114–105	Kawhi Leonard (25)	Serge Ibaka (14)	Kyle Lowry (8)	Golden 1 Center; 17,583	11–1
13	November 10	New York	W 128–112	Pascal Siakam (23)	Jonas Valanciunas (10)	Kyle Lowry (8)	Scotiabank Arena; 19,800	12–1
14	November 12	New Orleans	L 110–126	Pascal Siakam (22)	Serge Ibaka (14)	Kyle Lowry (11)	Scotiabank Arena; 19,800	12–2
15	November 14	Detroit	L 104–106	Kawhi Leonard (26)	Leonard, Monroe (9)	Kyle Lowry (7)	Scotiabank Arena; 19,800	12–3
16	November 16	@ Boston	L 116–123 (OT)	Kawhi Leonard (31)	Kawhi Leonard (15)	Kyle Lowry (7)	TD Garden; 18,624	12–4
17	November 17	@ Chicago	W 122–83	Fred VanVleet (18)	Jonas Valanciunas (9)	Kyle Lowry (8)	United Center; 21,263	13–4
18	November 20	@ Orlando	W 93–91	Kawhi Leonard (18)	Ibaka, Siakam (9)	Kyle Lowry (7)	Amway Center; 16,016	14–4
19	November 21	@ Atlanta	W 124–108	Jonas Valanciunas (24)	Jonas Valanciunas (13)	Kyle Lowry (17)	State Farm Arena; 15,058	15–4
20	November 23	Washington	W 125–107	Kawhi Leonard (27)	Kawhi Leonard (10)	Kyle Lowry (9)	Scotiabank Arena; 19,800	16–4
21	November 25	Miami	W 125–115	Kawhi Leonard (29)	Leonard, Valanciunas (10)	Kyle Lowry (10)	Scotiabank Arena; 19,800	17–4
22	November 27	@ Memphis	W 122–114	Kyle Lowry (24)	Kawhi Leonard (10)	Kyle Lowry (6)	FedExForum; 14,187	18–4
23	November 29	Golden State	W 131–128 (OT)	Kawhi Leonard (37)	Leonard, Lowry (8)	Kyle Lowry (12)	Scotiabank Arena; 19,800	19–4

December: 8–7 (home: 4–2; road: 4–5)

Game	Date	Team	Score	High points	High rebounds	High assists	Location Attendance	Record
24	December 1	@ Cleveland	W 106–95	Kawhi Leonard (34)	Kawhi Leonard (9)	Pascal Siakam (5)	Quicken Loans Arena; 19,432	20–4
25	December 3	Denver	L 103–106	Kawhi Leonard (27)	Jonas Valančiūnas (10)	Kyle Lowry (11)	Scotiabank Arena; 19,800	20–5
26	December 5	Philadelphia	W 113–102	Kawhi Leonard (36)	Kawhi Leonard (9)	Pascal Siakam (6)	Scotiabank Arena; 19,800	21–5
27	December 7	@ Brooklyn	L 105–106 (OT)	Kawhi Leonard (32)	Jonas Valančiūnas (8)	Kyle Lowry (11)	Barclays Center; 14,035	21–6
28	December 9	Milwaukee	L 99–104	Serge Ibaka (22)	Kawhi Leonard (8)	Kyle Lowry (7)	Scotiabank Arena; 19,800	21–7
29	December 11	@ L.A. Clippers	W 123–99	Serge Ibaka (25)	Serge Ibaka (9)	Fred VanVleet (14)	Staples Center; 17,812	22–7
30	December 12	@ Golden State	W 113–93	Kyle Lowry (23)	Serge Ibaka (12)	Kyle Lowry (12)	Oracle Arena; 19,596	23–7
31	December 14	@ Portland	L 122–128	Kawhi Leonard (28)	Danny Green (11)	Fred VanVleet (8)	Moda Center; 19,458	23–8
32	December 16	@ Denver	L 86–95	Kawhi Leonard (29)	Kawhi Leonard (14)	Leonard, Wright (4)	Pepsi Center; 19,520	23–9
33	December 19	Indiana	W 99–96	Kawhi Leonard (28)	Kawhi Leonard (10)	Kawhi Leonard (6)	Scotiabank Arena; 19,800	24–9
34	December 21	Cleveland	W 126–110	Kawhi Leonard (37)	Pascal Siakam (10)	Fred VanVleet (8)	Scotiabank Arena; 19,800	25–9
35	December 22	@ Philadelphia	L 101–126	Pascal Siakam (26)	Greg Monroe (8)	Kyle Lowry (5)	Wells Fargo Center; 20,691	25–10
36	December 26	@ Miami	W 106–104	Kawhi Leonard (30)	Pascal Siakam (9)	Serge Ibaka (4)	American Airlines Arena; 19,902	26–10
37	December 28	@ Orlando	L 87–116	Kawhi Leonard (21)	Serge Ibaka (8)	Delon Wright (6)	Amway Center; 18,846	26–11
38	December 30	Chicago	W 95–89	Kawhi Leonard (27)	Pascal Siakam (12)	Fred VanVleet (7)	Scotiabank Arena; 19,800	27–11

January: 10–5 (home: 7–1; road: 3–4)

Game	Date	Team	Score	High points	High rebounds	High assists	Location Attendance	Record
39	January 1	Utah	W 122–116	Kawhi Leonard (45)	Pascal Siakam (10)	Fred VanVleet (5)	Scotiabank Arena; 19,800	28–11
40	January 3	@ San Antonio	L 107–125	Kawhi Leonard (21)	Ibaka, Monroe, Siakam (6)	Pascal Siakam (7)	AT&T Center; 18,354	28–12
41	January 5	@ Milwaukee	W 123–116	Leonard, Siakam (30)	Serge Ibaka (9)	Fred VanVleet (8)	Fiserv Forum; 18,028	29–12
42	January 6	Indiana	W 121–105	Norman Powell (23)	Pascal Siakam (10)	Lowry, VanVleet (8)	Scotiabank Arena; 19,800	30–12
43	January 8	Atlanta	W 104–101	Kawhi Leonard (31)	Pascal Siakam (10)	Leonard, Lowry (6)	Scotiabank Arena; 19,800	31–12
44	January 11	Brooklyn	W 122–105	Kawhi Leonard (20)	Kawhi Leonard (11)	Kyle Lowry (8)	Scotiabank Arena; 19,800	32–12
45	January 13	@ Washington	W 140–138 (2OT)	Kawhi Leonard (41)	Pascal Siakam (19)	Kyle Lowry (11)	Capital One Arena; 16,919	33–12
46	January 16	@ Boston	L 108–117	Kawhi Leonard (33)	Serge Ibaka (10)	Lowry, Siakam (7)	TD Garden; 18,624	33–13
47	January 17	Phoenix	W 111–109	Serge Ibaka (22)	Pascal Siakam (12)	Kyle Lowry (8)	Scotiabank Arena; 19,800	34–13
48	January 19	Memphis	W 119–90	Danny Green (24)	Pascal Siakam (8)	Lowry, VanVleet (7)	Scotiabank Arena; 19,800	35–13
49	January 22	Sacramento	W 120–105	Lowry, VanVleet (19)	Serge Ibaka (10)	Kyle Lowry (9)	Scotiabank Arena; 19,800	36–13
50	January 23	@ Indiana	L 106–110	Serge Ibaka (23)	Serge Ibaka (11)	Kyle Lowry (7)	Bankers Life Fieldhouse; 16,879	36–14
51	January 25	@ Houston	L 119–121	Kawhi Leonard (32)	Serge Ibaka (14)	Kyle Lowry (11)	Toyota Center; 18,055	36–15
52	January 27	@ Dallas	W 123–120	Kawhi Leonard (33)	Serge Ibaka (11)	Kyle Lowry (9)	American Airlines Center; 20,308	37–15
53	January 31	Milwaukee	L 92–105	Pascal Siakam (28)	Serge Ibaka (10)	Lowry, Siakam, VanVleet (3)	Scotiabank Arena; 19,800	37–16

February: 8–1 (home: 5–1; road: 3–0)

Game	Date	Team	Score	High points	High rebounds	High assists	Location Attendance	Record
54	February 3	L.A. Clippers	W 121–103	Kawhi Leonard (18)	Serge Ibaka (12)	Fred VanVleet (7)	Scotiabank Arena; 19,800	38–16
55	February 5	@ Philadelphia	W 119–107	Kawhi Leonard (24)	Kyle Lowry (10)	Kyle Lowry (6)	Wells Fargo Center; 20,472	39–16
56	February 7	@ Atlanta	W 119–101	Pascal Siakam (33)	Pascal Siakam (14)	Kyle Lowry (13)	State Farm Arena; 16,036	40–16
57	February 9	@ New York	W 104–99	Kyle Lowry (22)	Serge Ibaka (13)	Leonard, VanVleet (6)	Madison Square Garden; 18,886	41–16
58	February 11	Brooklyn	W 127–125	Kawhi Leonard (30)	Serge Ibaka (12)	Kawhi Leonard (8)	Scotiabank Arena; 19,800	42–16
59	February 13	Washington	W 129–120	Pascal Siakam (44)	Serge Ibaka (13)	Kyle Lowry (13)	Scotiabank Arena; 19,800	43–16
60	February 22	San Antonio	W 120–117	Kawhi Leonard (25)	Serge Ibaka (15)	Gasol, Siakam (6)	Scotiabank Arena; 20,058	44–16
61	February 24	Orlando	L 98–113	Kyle Lowry (19)	Pascal Siakam (11)	Kyle Lowry (10)	Scotiabank Arena; 19,800	44–17
62	February 26	Boston	W 118–95	Pascal Siakam (25)	Pascal Siakam (8)	Kyle Lowry (11)	Scotiabank Arena; 19,800	45–17

March: 9–6 (home: 4–3; road: 5–3)

Game	Date	Team	Score	High points	High rebounds	High assists	Location Attendance	Record
63	March 1	Portland	W 119–117	Kawhi Leonard (38)	Marc Gasol (8)	Kyle Lowry (10)	Scotiabank Arena; 19,800	46–17
64	March 3	@ Detroit	L 107–112 (OT)	Kyle Lowry (35)	Serge Ibaka (11)	Gasol, Lowry, Siakam (5)	Little Caesars Arena; 19,161	46–18
65	March 5	Houston	L 95–107	Kawhi Leonard (26)	Serge Ibaka (15)	Kyle Lowry (6)	Scotiabank Arena; 19,800	46–19
66	March 8	@ New Orleans	W 127–104	Kawhi Leonard (31)	Ibaka, Lowry (11)	Kyle Lowry (12)	Smoothie King Center; 17,325	47–19
67	March 10	@ Miami	W 125–104	Kyle Lowry (24)	Serge Ibaka (8)	Kyle Lowry (10)	American Airlines Arena; 19,600	48–19
68	March 11	@ Cleveland	L 101–126	Kawhi Leonard (25)	Kawhi Leonard (9)	Kyle Lowry (6)	Quicken Loans Arena; 15,012	48–20
69	March 14	L.A. Lakers	W 111–98	Kawhi Leonard (25)	Leonard, Powell (8)	Pascal Siakam (6)	Scotiabank Arena; 19,926	49–20
70	March 17	@ Detroit	L 107–110	Kawhi Leonard (33)	Marc Gasol (11)	Marc Gasol (8)	Little Caesars Arena; 19,277	49–21
71	March 18	New York	W 128–92	Jeremy Lin (20)	Marc Gasol (11)	Fred VanVleet (12)	Scotiabank Arena; 19,800	50–21
72	March 20	@ Oklahoma City	W 123–114 (OT)	Pascal Siakam (33)	Pascal Siakam (13)	Green, Leonard, Siakam, VanVleet (6)	Chesapeake Energy Arena; 18,203	51–21
73	March 22	Oklahoma City	L 109–116	Kawhi Leonard (37)	Norman Powell (11)	Marc Gasol (6)	Scotiabank Arena; 20,014	51–22
74	March 24	Charlotte	L 114–115	Kawhi Leonard (28)	Kawhi Leonard (9)	Gasol, Lowry (6)	Scotiabank Arena; 19,800	51–23
75	March 26	Chicago	W 112–103	Norman Powell (20)	Serge Ibaka (8)	Kyle Lowry (6)	Scotiabank Arena; 19,800	52–23
76	March 28	@ New York	W 117–92	Pascal Siakam (31)	Serge Ibaka (10)	Fred VanVleet (8)	Madison Square Garden; 19,812	53–23
77	March 30	@ Chicago	W 124–101	Ibaka, VanVleet (23)	Serge Ibaka (12)	Kyle Lowry (8)	United Center; 21,238	54–23

April: 4–1 (home: 2–0; road: 2–1)

Game	Date	Team	Score	High points	High rebounds	High assists	Location Attendance	Record
78	April 1	Orlando	W 121–109	Danny Green (29)	Kawhi Leonard (7)	Lowry, VanVleet (7)	Scotiabank Arena; 19,800	55–23
79	April 3	@ Brooklyn	W 115–105	Pascal Siakam (28)	Serge Ibaka (12)	Marc Gasol (6)	Barclays Center; 17,732	56–23
80	April 5	@ Charlotte	L 111–113	Kawhi Leonard (29)	Serge Ibaka (12)	Kyle Lowry (11)	Spectrum Center; 18,684	56–24
81	April 7	Miami	W 117–109 (OT)	Powell, Siakam (23)	Gasol, Siakam (10)	Marc Gasol (7)	Scotiabank Arena; 19,800	57–24
82	April 9	@ Minnesota	W 120–100	Kawhi Leonard (20)	Chris Boucher (13)	Jeremy Lin (5)	Target Center; 16,119	58–24

2018–19 season schedule

=== Playoffs ===
see also 2019 NBA Playoffs and 2019 NBA Finals

2019 playoff game log
Total: 16–8 (Home: 9–4; Road: 7–4)
First Round: 4–1 (home: 2–1; road: 2–0)

Game	Date	Team	Score	High points	High rebounds	High assists	Location Attendance	Series
1	April 13	Orlando	L 101–104	Kawhi Leonard (25)	Pascal Siakam (9)	Kyle Lowry (8)	Scotiabank Arena; 19,937	0–1
2	April 16	Orlando	W 111–82	Kawhi Leonard (37)	Pascal Siakam (10)	Kyle Lowry (7)	Scotiabank Arena; 19,964	1–1
3	April 19	@ Orlando	W 98–93	Pascal Siakam (30)	Pascal Siakam (11)	Kyle Lowry (10)	Amway Center; 19,367	2–1
4	April 21	@ Orlando	W 107–85	Kawhi Leonard (34)	Serge Ibaka (8)	Kyle Lowry (9)	Amway Center; 19,087	3–1
5	April 23	Orlando	W 115–96	Kawhi Leonard (27)	Marc Gasol (9)	Fred VanVleet (10)	Scotiabank Arena; 19,800	4–1

Conference Semifinals: 4–3 (home: 3–1; road: 1–2)

Game	Date	Team	Score	High points	High rebounds	High assists	Location Attendance	Series
1	April 27	Philadelphia	W 108–95	Kawhi Leonard (45)	Kawhi Leonard (11)	Kyle Lowry (8)	Scotiabank Arena; 19,800	1–0
2	April 29	Philadelphia	L 89–94	Kawhi Leonard (35)	Gasol, Leonard, Siakam (7)	Kawhi Leonard (6)	Scotiabank Arena; 19,800	1–1
3	May 2	@ Philadelphia	L 95–116	Kawhi Leonard (33)	Gasol, Green (6)	Kyle Lowry (5)	Wells Fargo Center; 20,658	1–2
4	May 5	@ Philadelphia	W 101–96	Kawhi Leonard (39)	Kawhi Leonard (14)	Kyle Lowry (7)	Wells Fargo Center; 20,639	2–2
5	May 7	Philadelphia	W 125–89	Pascal Siakam (25)	Kawhi Leonard (13)	Kyle Lowry (5)	Scotiabank Arena; 20,287	3–2
6	May 9	@ Philadelphia	L 101–112	Kawhi Leonard (29)	Kawhi Leonard (12)	Kyle Lowry (6)	Wells Fargo Center; 20,525	3–3
7	May 12	Philadelphia	W 92–90	Kawhi Leonard (41)	Gasol, Siakam (11)	Kyle Lowry (6)	Scotiabank Arena; 20,917	4–3

Conference Finals: 4–2 (home: 3–0; road: 1–2)

Game	Date	Team	Score	High points	High rebounds	High assists	Location Attendance	Series
1	May 15	@ Milwaukee	L 100–108	Kawhi Leonard (31)	Marc Gasol (12)	Marc Gasol (5)	Fiserv Forum; 17,345	0–1
2	May 17	@ Milwaukee	L 103–125	Kawhi Leonard (31)	Serge Ibaka (10)	Kyle Lowry (4)	Fiserv Forum; 17,570	0–2
3	May 19	Milwaukee	W 118–112 (2OT)	Kawhi Leonard (36)	Marc Gasol (12)	Marc Gasol (7)	Scotiabank Arena; 19,932	1–2
4	May 21	Milwaukee	W 120–102	Kyle Lowry (25)	Serge Ibaka (13)	Marc Gasol (7)	Scotiabank Arena; 20,237	2–2
5	May 23	@ Milwaukee	W 105–99	Kawhi Leonard (35)	Pascal Siakam (13)	Kawhi Leonard (9)	Fiserv Forum; 17,384	3–2
6	May 25	Milwaukee	W 100–94	Kawhi Leonard (27)	Kawhi Leonard (17)	Kyle Lowry (8)	Scotiabank Arena; 20,478	4–2

NBA Finals: 4–2 (home: 1–2; road: 3–0)

Game	Date	Team	Score	High points	High rebounds	High assists	Location Attendance	Series
1	May 30	Golden State	W 118–109	Pascal Siakam (32)	Leonard, Siakam (8)	Kyle Lowry (9)	Scotiabank Arena; 19,983	1–0
2	June 2	Golden State	L 104–109	Kawhi Leonard (34)	Kawhi Leonard (14)	Pascal Siakam (5)	Scotiabank Arena; 20,014	1–1
3	June 5	@ Golden State	W 123–109	Kawhi Leonard (30)	Pascal Siakam (9)	Kyle Lowry (9)	Oracle Arena; 19,596	2–1
4	June 7	@ Golden State	W 105–92	Kawhi Leonard (36)	Kawhi Leonard (12)	Kyle Lowry (7)	Oracle Arena; 19,596	3–1
5	June 10	Golden State	L 105–106	Kawhi Leonard (26)	Kawhi Leonard (12)	Leonard, Lowry (6)	Scotiabank Arena; 20,144	3–2
6	June 13	@ Golden State	W 114–110	Lowry, Siakam (26)	Pascal Siakam (10)	Kyle Lowry (10)	Oracle Arena; 19,596	4–2

== Player statistics ==
=== Regular season ===
Player	POS	GP	GS	MP	REB	AST	STL	BLK	PTS	MPG	RPG	APG	SPG	BPG	PPG
Danny Green	SG	80	80	2,216	317	126	73	53	821	27.7	4.0	1.6	.9	.7	10.3
Pascal Siakam	PF	80	79	2,548	549	248	73	52	1,354	31.9	6.9	3.1	.9	.7	16.9
Serge Ibaka	C	74	51	2,010	601	99	29	103	1,112	27.2	8.1	1.3	.4	1.4	15.0
OG Anunoby	SF	67	6	1,352	197	47	46	22	469	20.2	2.9	.7	.7	.3	7.0
Kyle Lowry	PG	65	65	2,213	312	564	91	31	926	34.0	4.8	8.7	1.4	.5	14.2
Fred VanVleet	PG	64	28	1,760	167	307	57	20	701	27.5	2.6	4.8	.9	.3	11.0
Kawhi Leonard	SF	60	60	2,040	439	199	106	24	1,596	34.0	7.3	3.3	1.8	.4	26.6
Norman Powell	SG	60	3	1,126	139	91	39	13	516	18.8	2.3	1.5	.7	.2	8.6
Delon Wright^{†}	PG	49	2	897	125	110	46	15	337	18.3	2.6	2.2	.9	.3	6.9
C. J. Miles^{†}	SF	40	1	562	68	22	18	10	218	14.1	1.7	.6	.5	.3	5.5
Greg Monroe^{†}	C	38	2	423	156	16	13	8	183	11.1	4.1	.4	.3	.2	4.8
Jonas Valančiūnas^{†}	C	30	10	564	216	29	13	23	384	18.8	7.2	1.0	.4	.8	12.8
Chris Boucher	PF	28	0	163	56	2	6	24	93	5.8	2.0	.1	.2	.9	3.3
Marc Gasol^{†}	C	26	19	648	172	101	24	23	237	24.9	6.6	3.9	.9	.9	9.1
Patrick McCaw^{†}	SG	26	1	344	45	27	21	2	69	13.2	1.7	1.0	.8	.1	2.7
Lorenzo Brown	PG	26	0	212	31	28	12	5	55	8.2	1.2	1.1	.5	.2	2.1
Jeremy Lin^{†}	PG	23	3	433	60	50	9	6	161	18.8	2.6	2.2	.4	.3	7.0
Malachi Richardson	SG	22	0	103	13	0	1	0	30	4.7	.6	.0	.0	.0	1.4
Jordan Loyd	PG	12	0	55	9	6	0	0	29	4.6	.8	.5	.0	.0	2.4
Malcolm Miller	SF	10	0	67	5	1	1	1	35	6.7	.5	.1	.1	.1	3.5
Jodie Meeks	SG	8	0	104	12	8	1	1	51	13.0	1.5	1.0	.1	.1	6.4
Eric Moreland^{†}	PF	4	0	38	17	4	1	1	7	9.5	4.3	1.0	.3	.3	1.8

- ^{†} Denotes player spent time with another team in the season. Stats reflect time with the Raptors only.

=== Playoffs ===
Player	POS	GP	GS	MP	REB	AST	STL	BLK	PTS	MPG	RPG	APG	SPG	BPG	PPG
Kawhi Leonard	SF	24	24	939	218	94	40	17	732	39.1	9.1	3.9	1.7	.7	30.5
Kyle Lowry	PG	24	24	901	117	159	31	7	361	37.5	4.9	6.6	1.3	.3	15.0
Pascal Siakam	PF	24	24	891	171	66	24	17	455	37.1	7.1	2.8	1.0	.7	19.0
Marc Gasol	C	24	24	735	154	73	21	26	226	30.6	6.4	3.0	.9	1.1	9.4
Danny Green	SG	24	24	684	87	26	32	11	166	28.5	3.6	1.1	1.3	.5	6.9
Fred VanVleet	PG	24	0	592	40	62	18	6	192	24.7	1.7	2.6	.8	.3	8.0
Serge Ibaka	C	24	0	500	143	22	11	23	225	20.8	6.0	.9	.5	1.0	9.4
Norman Powell	SG	23	0	366	51	26	9	0	150	15.9	2.2	1.1	.4	.0	6.5
Jodie Meeks	SG	14	0	66	9	1	4	1	22	4.7	.6	.1	.3	.1	1.6
Patrick McCaw	SG	11	0	48	3	4	2	0	5	4.4	.3	.4	.2	.0	.5
Malcolm Miller	SF	10	0	28	5	1	0	1	8	2.8	.5	.1	.0	.1	.8
Eric Moreland	PF	8	0	28	14	3	0	0	2	3.5	1.8	.4	.0	.0	.3
Jeremy Lin	PG	8	0	27	3	4	1	0	9	3.4	.4	.5	.1	.0	1.1
Chris Boucher	PF	2	0	4	1	0	0	1	5	2.0	.5	.0	.0	.5	2.5

== Transactions ==
=== Trades ===
July 18, 2018	To Toronto Raptors Kawhi Leonard; Danny Green	To San Antonio Spurs DeMar DeRozan; Jakob Pöltl; 2019 protected Toronto first-round pick
February 6, 2019	To Toronto Raptors Cash considerations	To Philadelphia 76ers Malachi Richardson; Draft rights to Emir Preldžić; 2022 second-round pick
February 7, 2019	To Toronto Raptors Marc Gasol	To Memphis Grizzlies Jonas Valančiūnas; Delon Wright; CJ Miles; 2024 second-round draft pick
February 7, 2019	To Toronto Raptors Cash considerations	To Brooklyn Nets Greg Monroe; 2021 second-round draft pick

=== Free agency ===
==== Re-signed ====
Player	Signed	Contract
Fred VanVleet	July 6, 2018	2-yr/$18.1M
Lorenzo Brown	July 20, 2018	1-yr/$1.62M

==== Additions ====
Player	Signed	Contract	Former team
Chris Boucher	July 20, 2018	Two-way contract	Golden State Warriors
Jordan Loyd	August 7, 2018	Two-way contract	(Turkey) Darüşşafaka
Greg Monroe	August 10, 2018	1-yr/$2.2M	Boston Celtics
Jeremy Lin	February 13, 2019	$697,000	Atlanta Hawks

==== Subtractions ====
Player	Reason	New Team
Alfonzo McKinnie	Waived	Golden State Warriors
Lucas Nogueira	Unrestricted Free Agent	Baloncesto Fuenlabrada
Kay Felder	Waived	Raptors 905
Deng Adel	Waived	Raptors 905
Kyle Collinsworth	Waived	Raptors 905
Eric Moreland	Waived	Phoenix Suns
Malcolm Miller	Waived	Raptors 905

== Awards ==
Player	Award	Date awarded	Ref.
Pascal Siakam	Eastern Conference Player of the Week	November 12, 2018	
Nick Nurse	Eastern Conference Coach of the Month (November)	December 2, 2018	
Kawhi Leonard	Eastern Conference Player of the Week	December 3, 2018	
Kawhi Leonard	Eastern Conference Player of the Week	January 14, 2019	
Kawhi Leonard	NBA All-Star starter (3rd appearance)	January 24, 2019	
Kyle Lowry	NBA All-Star reserve (5th appearance)	January 31, 2019	
Kawhi Leonard	All-Defensive Second Team	May 22, 2019	
Kawhi Leonard	All-NBA Second Team	May 23, 2019	
Kawhi Leonard	NBA Finals MVP	June 14, 2019	
Pascal Siakam	NBA Most Improved Player	June 25, 2019	
