= Markelle Fultz =

American basketball player (born 1998)

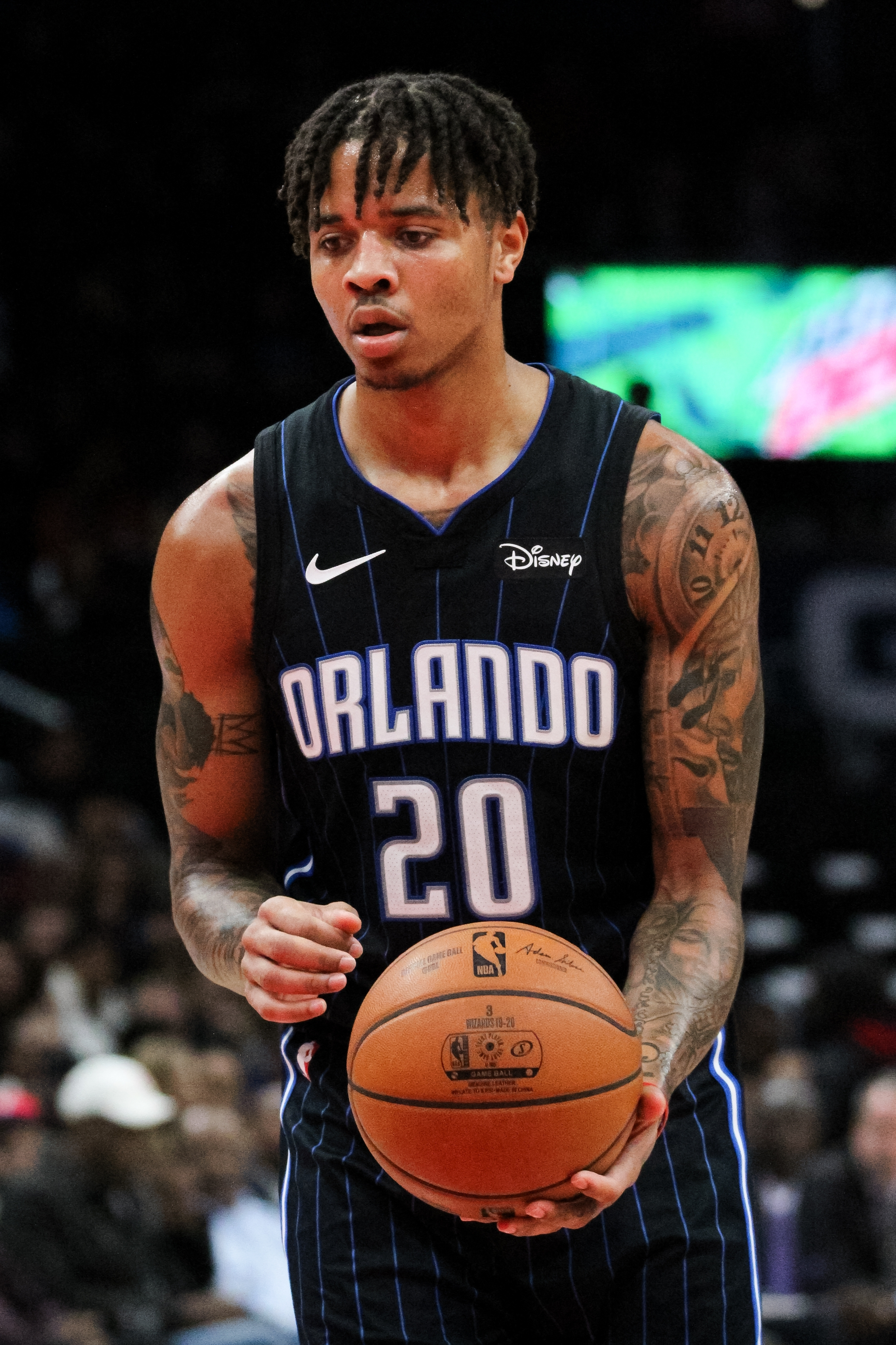
- Fultz with the Orlando Magic in 2019

Free agent
- Position: Point guard

Personal information
- Born: May 29, 1998 (age 28) Upper Marlboro, Maryland, U.S.
- Listed height: 6 ft 4 in (1.93 m)
- Listed weight: 209 lb (95 kg)

Career information
- High school: DeMatha Catholic (Hyattsville, Maryland)
- College: Washington (2016–2017)
- NBA draft: 2017: 1st round, 1st overall pick
- Drafted by: Philadelphia 76ers
- Playing career: 2017–present

Career history
- 2017–2019: Philadelphia 76ers
- 2019–2024: Orlando Magic
- 2025: Sacramento Kings
- 2026: Raptors 905
- 2026: Toronto Raptors

Career highlights
- Third-team All-American – AP, NABC, SN (2017); First-team All-Pac-12 (2017); FIBA Under-18 Americas Championship MVP (2016); McDonald's All-American (2016)
- Stats at NBA.com
- Stats at Basketball Reference
Medals
Men's basketball
Representing the United States
FIBA Americas Under-18 Championship
Gold medal – first place	2016 Chile	Team

Markelle N'Gai Fultz (born May 29, 1998) is an American professional basketball player who last played for the Toronto Raptors of the National Basketball Association (NBA). He played college basketball for the Washington Huskies before being selected by the Philadelphia 76ers with the first overall pick in the 2017 NBA draft.

During his single season (2016–17) with the Huskies, Fultz played point guard and shooting guard. Despite Washington's relatively disappointing year, he was named a third-team All-American and first-team All-Pac-12. He began his NBA career with the Philadelphia 76ers before being traded to the Orlando Magic in 2019, and later signing with the Sacramento Kings in 2025 and with the Toronto Raptors in 2026.

== Early life ==
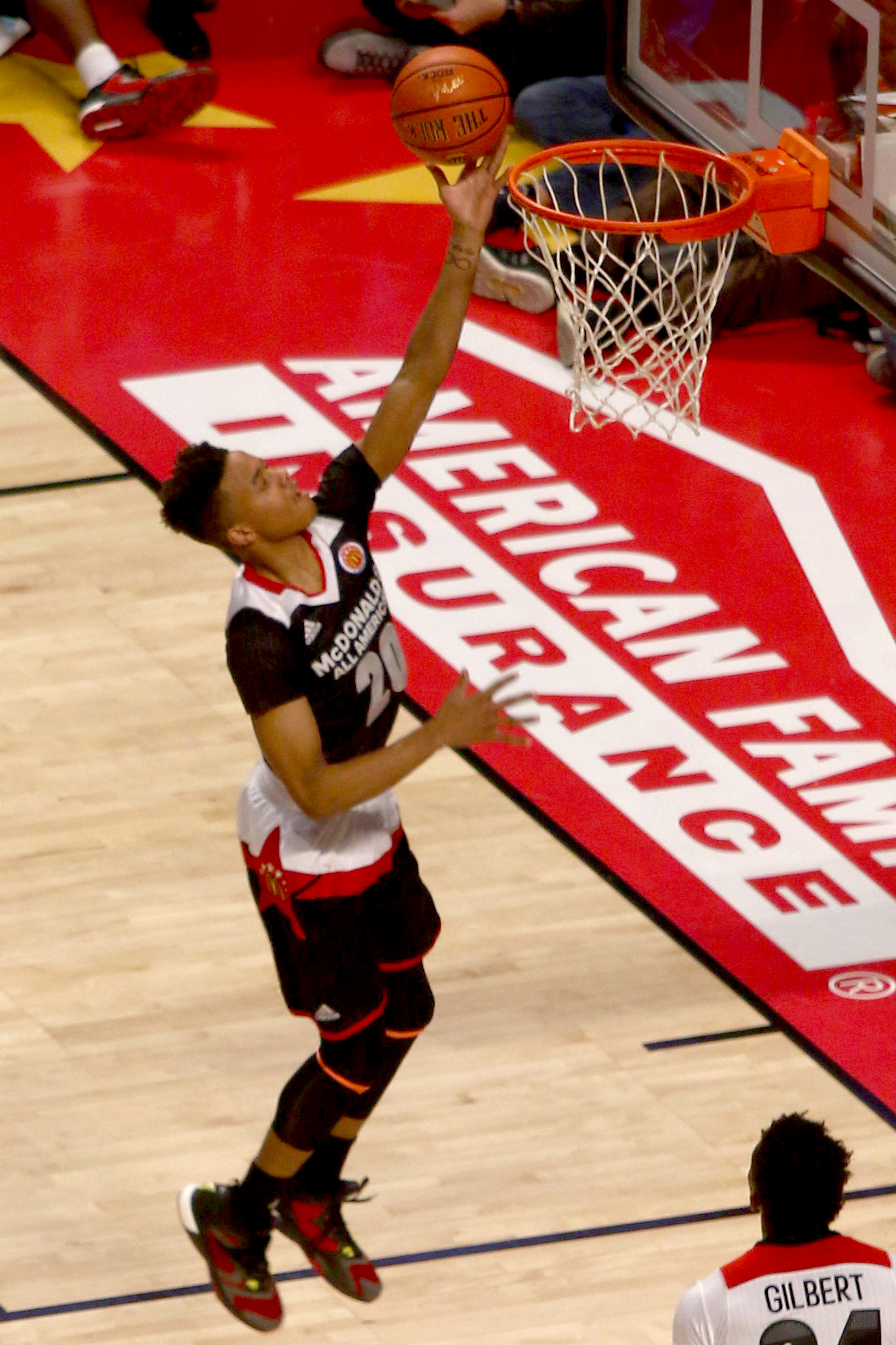
Fultz at the 2016 McDonald's All-American Game

Fultz was born on May 29, 1998, in Upper Marlboro, Maryland, the younger of two children. His father abandoned the family, so he relied heavily on his mother, Ebony. Passionate about basketball, Fultz was mentored in his early years by a local instructor named Keith Williams. In 2012, he began attending DeMatha Catholic High, an all-boys prep school and basketball powerhouse. He had shown promise on the DeMatha Stags' freshman team; but as a sophomore, the 5-foot-9-inch (1.75 m) guard was cut from the varsity roster. He was overlooked due to his awkward gait, having the appearance of "Bambi"; as assistant coach Cory McCrae explained, "He was long and lanky, and he'd walk and his knees would be hurting". However, Fultz outplayed the competition at the junior varsity level, making it apparent that he did not belong there.

Assistant coach Raphael Chillious of the Washington Huskies was the first to notice Fultz's potential, describing him as an athlete with the makings of an NBA All-Star-caliber player if he continued to grow. At the start of his junior season, Fultz stood 6 feet 3 inches (1.91 m). As a starter for DeMatha's varsity team, he averaged 16.8 points, 7.9 rebounds, and 4.3 assists per game and was named the Player of the Year in the highly-competitive Washington Catholic Athletic Conference. Among the highlights of his junior campaign were the game-winning foul shots he made in a 16-point performance while being guarded by Jayson Tatum of Chaminade and the triple-double he posted in a matchup against Roselle Catholic at the Hoophall Classic. His recruiting stature abruptly soared during this season, with Rivals.com ranking him number 24 in the Class of 2016 and over 20 college programs offering him scholarships.

On August 21, 2015, Fultz committed to the University of Washington. As a senior, he averaged 19.1 points and 8.8 rebounds per game where he concluded his high school career as he recorded the Stags' single-season record for assists with 278 and led the team to their second consecutive conference championship. At the McDonald's All-American Game on March 31, 2016, Fultz tallied 10 points, 6 rebounds, and 4 assists. At the Jordan Brand Classic come April, Fultz accumulated 19 points in a 131–117 East team victory. During the summer, he was selected to Team USA's FIBA Americas Under-18 roster. With Fultz as its leading scorer, the team progressed to the gold medal championship game; and in dominant fashion, Fultz posted 23 points and earned the tournament's MVP award for his performance.

By the end of his senior year, Fultz was rated as a five-star recruit considered a top-ten recruit in the 2016 class. He was ranked as the third best point guard in the 2016 high school class and number three overall by Scout.com, number five by Rivals.com, and number seven by ESPN. At DeMatha, Fultz was a basketball teammate and friend of Chase Young, who was later named the 2020 NFL Defensive Rookie of the Year after being selected by the Washington Football Team second overall in the 2020 NFL draft.

=== College prospect info ===
College recruiting
Name	Hometown	School	Height	Weight	Commit date
Markelle Fultz; PG	Upper Marlboro, Maryland	DeMatha Catholic High School	6 ft 4 in (1.93 m)	190 lb (86 kg)	Aug 21, 2015
Markelle Fultz; PG	Recruit ratings: Scout: Rivals: 247Sports: ESPN: (96)				
Overall recruit ranking: Scout: 3 Rivals: 5 ESPN: 7
Note: In many cases, Scout, Rivals, 247Sports, On3, and ESPN may conflict in their listings of height and weight.; In these cases, the average was taken. ESPN grades are on a 100-point scale.; Sources:

== College career ==
The Washington Huskies were fully expecting to open the 2016–17 season with Dejounte Murray and Marquese Chriss; instead, however, both freshmen were selected in the first round of the 2016 NBA draft. Fultz said of the anticipated scenario if they had stayed: "I think we would be No. 1 in the country. We would have gone to the (NCAA) tournament and won". Without any proven talent and only one returning starter, Fultz took charge as a team leader and primary scorer. As the starting point guard, he debuted in a 98–90 home game loss to the Yale Bulldogs in which he posted 30 points.

Although the Huskies finished with a disappointing 9–22 record, Fultz enjoyed one of the best freshman seasons in all Pac-12 Conference history. In 25 games that season, his 23.2 point average was the highest mark in the Pac-12 in 20 years and second in Huskies history behind Bob Houbregs' 25.6 points per game in 1952–1953. Fultz also led the team in minutes played with 35.7 per game as well as assists with 5.7 per game and was second in rebounds with 5.9 per game. By the time Pac-12 honors were awarded, Fultz—‌the lone Husky selected—‌was named to the First-team All-Pac-12 and Third-team All-American. A player who "jumps off the page athletically and possesses creative scoring instincts and playmaking skills", the consensus among sports analysts was that Fultz would be the first overall pick in the 2017 NBA draft.

== Professional career ==
=== Philadelphia 76ers (2017–2019) ===
Fultz was selected as the first overall pick in the 2017 NBA draft by the Philadelphia 76ers, who then finalized his four-year rookie contract on July 8. The 76ers, after years of mediocrity, had lofty expectations of returning to the playoffs for the first time since 2012; such were the high hopes that rested on their new core consisting of Fultz, Joel Embiid, and Ben Simmons. In his first regular season game, on October 18, the rookie posted 10 points, 3 rebounds, and 1 assist in 18 minutes of play coming off the bench. It was not long, however, before a shoulder injury—termed a "scapular muscle imbalance"—so ravaged his shooting that he shot only 33 percent from the field and attempted zero three-pointers in four games. In response, the 76ers decided to sit Fultz indefinitely until he recovered. Debate ensued between sports analysts and the organization over how much his shooting woes were of physical versus psychological origin. Fultz himself later clarified: "What happened [...] was an injury. Let me get that straight. It was an injury that happened that didn't allow me to go through the certain paths that I needed to, to shoot the ball."

During his hiatus, Fultz's basic shooting mechanics appeared to change under a trainer from outside the 76ers organization; this and his lengthy recovery period taken were heavily scrutinized. The team's president of basketball operations, Bryan Colangelo, suggested that the rookie might very well sit for the remainder of the season; but on March 26, 2018, it was announced that Fultz would return to the hardwood for an upcoming game against the Denver Nuggets. Despite some missteps, such as one air ball shot and some shots blocked, Fultz put up 10 points and 8 assists in 14 minutes of playing time. On April 11, at the age of 19 and 317 days, Fultz became the youngest player in NBA history at the time to record a triple-double, putting up 13 points, 10 rebounds, and 10 assists in a 130–95 win over the Milwaukee Bucks, a record that was later broken by LaMelo Ball.

For the 2018–19 season, head coach Brett Brown named Fultz the starting shooting guard over veteran JJ Redick. Fifteen games into the season, however, Fultz lost the position to Jimmy Butler, whom the 76ers acquired in a trade with the Minnesota Timberwolves. Conflicting statements regarding Fultz's health and poor production continued to be sources of conflict and drama for the team. On November 20, 2018, his agent Raymond Brothers announced Fultz would not participate in practice or games until a shoulder injury was evaluated; his ailment was later described as thoracic outlet syndrome (TOS), the neurogenic type of the disorder which "affects nerves between the neck and shoulder resulting in abnormal functional movement and range of motion, thus severely limiting Markelle's ability to shoot a basketball".

=== Orlando Magic (2019–2024) ===
On February 7, 2019, Fultz was traded to the Orlando Magic in exchange for Jonathon Simmons, an Oklahoma City Thunder first-round pick, and a Cleveland Cavaliers second round pick. Magic coach Steve Clifford later stated in March that he did not anticipate Fultz returning to play during the season, stressing that his shoulder injury was indeed "very serious." Fultz made his Magic debut on October 23, 2019, putting up 12 points, six assists, and two steals in a 94–85 win over the Cleveland Cavaliers.

On December 21, 2020, Fultz signed a three-year, $50 million contract extension through 2023–24.

On December 27, 2020, Fultz put up 26 points in a 120–113 win over the Washington Wizards. On January 6, 2021, Fultz suffered a torn left ACL against the Cleveland Cavaliers in the first quarter and missed the remainder of the 2020–21 season.

Fultz resumed playing on February 28, 2022, against the Indiana Pacers. On April 10, Fultz put up a career-high 15 assists in a 125–111 win over the Miami Heat.

On March 18, 2023, Fultz recorded a career-high 28 points, along with six rebounds, four assists, and four steals during a 113–108 win over the Los Angeles Clippers.

=== Sacramento Kings (2025) ===
On February 12, 2025, Fultz signed with the Sacramento Kings. Fultz made 21 appearances for Sacramento, averaging 2.9 points, 1.0 rebound, and 1.3 assists.

=== Toronto Raptors / Raptors 905 (2026) ===
On March 6, 2026, Fultz signed with the Raptors 905, the NBA G-League affiliate of the Toronto Raptors. On March 23, Fultz signed a 10-day contract with Toronto.

== Career statistics ==
Legend
GP	Games played	GS	Games started	MPG	Minutes per game
FG%	Field goal percentage	3P%	3-point field goal percentage	FT%	Free throw percentage
RPG	Rebounds per game	APG	Assists per game	SPG	Steals per game
BPG	Blocks per game	PPG	Points per game	**Bold**	Career high

=== NBA ===
==== Regular season ====
Year	Team	GP	GS	MPG	FG%	3P%	FT%	RPG	APG	SPG	BPG	PPG
2017–18	Philadelphia	14	0	18.1	.405	.000	.476	3.1	3.8	.9	.3	7.1
2018–19	Philadelphia	19	15	22.5	.419	.286	.568	3.7	3.1	.9	.3	8.2
2019–20	Orlando	**72**	**60**	27.7	.465	.267	.730	3.3	5.1	1.3	.2	12.1
2020–21	Orlando	8	8	26.9	.394	.250	.895	3.1	5.4	1.0	.3	12.9
2021–22	Orlando	18	3	20.0	.474	.235	.806	2.7	5.5	1.1	.3	10.8
2022–23	Orlando	60	**60**	**29.6**	**.514**	.310	.783	**3.9**	**5.7**	**1.5**	**.4**	**14.0**
2023–24	Orlando	43	18	21.2	.472	.222	.697	3.2	2.8	1.0	.3	7.8
2024–25	Sacramento	21	0	8.8	.418	**.500**	**1.000**	1.0	1.3	.5	.1	2.9
2025–26	Toronto	5	0	7.2	.182	–	–	.2	1.6	.4	.0	.8
Career		260	164	23.7	.469	.280	.732	3.1	4.3	1.1	.3	10.2

==== Playoffs ====
Year	Team	GP	GS	MPG	FG%	3P%	FT%	RPG	APG	SPG	BPG	PPG
2018	Philadelphia	3	0	7.6	.143	—	.750	1.0	1.7	.7	.0	1.7
2020	Orlando	5	**5**	**29.3**	.400	**.375**	**.857**	**2.2**	**5.2**	**1.0**	**.6**	**12.0**
2024	Orlando	**7**	0	15.1	**.588**	.000	.556	2.0	1.1	.4	.0	6.4
Career		15	5	18.3	.446	.353	.700	1.9	2.6	.7	.2	7.3

=== College ===
Year	Team	GP	GS	MPG	FG%	3P%	FT%	RPG	APG	SPG	BPG	PPG
2016–17	Washington	25	25	35.7	.476	.413	.649	5.7	5.9	1.6	1.2	23.2
