= Greg Monroe =

American basketball player (born 1990)

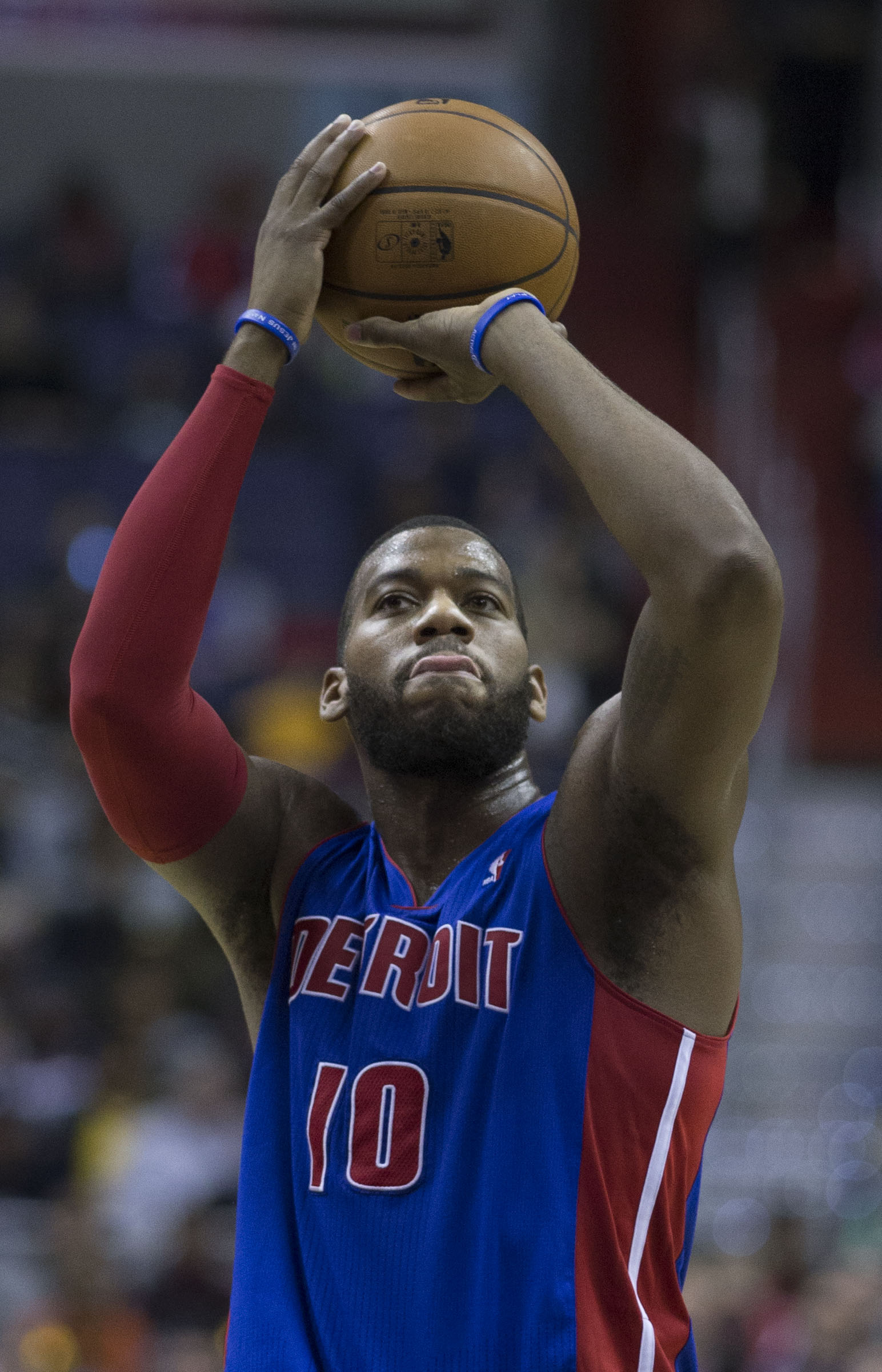
- Monroe with the Detroit Pistons in 2014

New Orleans Pelicans
- Title: Player development coach
- League: NBA

Personal information
- Born: June 4, 1990 (age 36) Baton Rouge, Louisiana, U.S.
- Listed height: 6 ft 10 in (2.08 m)
- Listed weight: 260 lb (118 kg)

Career information
- High school: Helen Cox (Harvey, Louisiana)
- College: Georgetown (2008–2010)
- NBA draft: 2010: 1st round, 7th overall pick
- Drafted by: Detroit Pistons
- Playing career: 2010–2023
- Position: Center / power forward
- Number: 10, 15, 14, 55

Career history
- 2010–2015: Detroit Pistons
- 2015–2017: Milwaukee Bucks
- 2017–2018: Phoenix Suns
- 2018: Boston Celtics
- 2018–2019: Toronto Raptors
- 2019: Boston Celtics
- 2019: Philadelphia 76ers
- 2019–2020: Bayern Munich
- 2020–2021: Khimki Moscow
- 2021: Capital City Go-Go
- 2021–2022: Minnesota Timberwolves
- 2022: Washington Wizards
- 2022: Capital City Go-Go
- 2022: Milwaukee Bucks
- 2022: Utah Jazz
- 2022: Minnesota Timberwolves
- 2022–2023: Shanxi Loongs
- 2023: Osos de Manatí
- 2023: Sichuan Blue Whales

Career highlights
- NBA All-Rookie Second Team (2011); Pete Newell Big Man Award (2010); Third-team All-American – AP, NABC (2010); First-team All-Big East (2010); Big East Rookie of the Year (2009); Big East All-Rookie Team (2009); McDonald's All-American (2008); Morgan Wootten National Player of the Year (2008); First-team Parade All-American (2008); Third-team Parade All-American (2007); 2× Louisiana Mr. Basketball (2007, 2008)

Career NBA statistics
- Points: 8,402 (13.0 ppg)
- Rebounds: 5,293 (8.2 rpg)
- Assists: 1,376 (2.1 apg)
- Stats at NBA.com
- Stats at Basketball Reference

Gregory Keith Monroe Jr. (born June 4, 1990) is an American former professional basketball player who is a player development coach for the New Orleans Pelicans of the National Basketball Association (NBA). He was drafted by the Detroit Pistons in the 2010 NBA draft with the seventh overall pick and became the last Pistons player to wear the number 10 jersey, as the Pistons retired the number for Dennis Rodman in 2011. In his freshman season at Georgetown University, Monroe was named Big East Rookie of the Year.

== High school career ==
Monroe attended Helen Cox High School in Harvey, Louisiana. As a senior in 2007–08, he was named a McDonald's All-American and earned Parade All-America first team honors after averaging 21.0 points and 14.0 rebounds per game.

=== Recruiting ===
Considered a five-star recruit by Rivals.com, Monroe was listed as the No. 1 power forward and the No. 8 player in the nation in 2008. He committed to play college basketball at Georgetown over offers from Duke, LSU, and Kansas.

As of 2025, Monroe is the highest-rated recruit to sign with Georgetown in the modern era.

College recruiting
Name	Hometown	School	Height	Weight	Commit date
Greg Monroe; PF	Harvey, LA	Helen Cox (LA)	6 ft 10 in (2.08 m)	220 lb (100 kg)	Oct 15, 2007
Greg Monroe; PF	Recruit ratings: 247Sports: ESPN: (96)				
Overall recruit ranking: ESPN: 20
Note: In many cases, Scout, Rivals, 247Sports, On3, and ESPN may conflict in their listings of height and weight.; In these cases, the average was taken. ESPN grades are on a 100-point scale.; Sources: "Georgetown 2008 Basketball Commitments". Rivals.; "2008 Georgetown Hoyas Recruiting Class". ESPN.; "2008 Team Ranking". Rivals.

== College career ==
=== Freshman season (2008–2009) ===
In his freshman season at Georgetown, Monroe was named the Big East Rookie of the Year and earned Big East All-Rookie team and CBSSports.com NCAA Freshman All-American first team honors. In 31 games, he averaged 12.7 points, 6.5 rebounds, 2.5 assists, 1.8 steals, and 1.5 blocks in 30.9 minutes per game.

=== Sophomore season (2009–2010) ===
In his sophomore season, Monroe was named to the All-Big East first team, Big East All-Tournament team, USBWA All-District II team, NABC Division I All-District 5 first team, AP NCAA All-America third team and NABC Division I All-America third team. In 34 games, he averaged 16.1 points, 9.6 rebounds, 3.8 assists, 1.2 steals and 1.5 blocks in 34.2 minutes per game.

On April 17, 2010, Monroe declared for the NBA draft, forgoing his final two years of college eligibility.

== Professional career ==
=== Detroit Pistons (2010–2015) ===
Monroe was selected with the seventh overall pick in the first round of the 2010 NBA draft by the Detroit Pistons. On July 6, 2010, he signed with the Pistons.

Monroe made his NBA regular season debut on October 30, 2010, against the Chicago Bulls. He came off the bench to score 2 points and 3 rebounds in 7 minutes. After coming off the bench for the first month of the season, Monroe made his first career start on December 10, 2010, against the Minnesota Timberwolves. In this game, Monroe recorded eight points, fifteen rebounds, and a block in 35 minutes of action. Despite a slow start to the season, Monroe's production increased in 2011 as he became a solid scorer and rebounder for the rebuilding Pistons. On February 23, 2011, against the Indiana Pacers, Monroe had his best game of the season with 27 points and 12 rebounds on 11–17 shooting.

On May 4, 2011, Monroe placed sixth in NBA Rookie of the Year voting totals, finishing closely behind Gary Neal of San Antonio.

During the 2011–12 season, Monroe played in and started all of Detroit's 66 games. On February 8, 2012, he was selected to play in the NBA All-Star Weekend Rising Stars Challenge. Monroe and teammate Brandon Knight were both selected for Team Shaq, despite them being drafted in different years.

During the 2013–14 season, Monroe recorded his third consecutive season with 1,000-plus points and 600-plus rebounds, joining Grant Hill as the only Pistons to do so since 1994–95.

On June 30, 2014, the Pistons tendered a one-year qualifying offer to make Monroe a restricted free agent. On September 8, 2014, it was announced Monroe signed the Pistons' qualifying offer, thus making him an unrestricted free agent in 2015. The next day, the NBA suspended Monroe without pay for the first two games of the 2014–15 season for driving while visibly impaired in February 2014. On December 3, 2014, he scored a season-high 29 points in a 102–109 overtime loss to the Boston Celtics. On April 8, 2015, he returned to action after missing 11 games with a knee injury to record 19 points and 10 rebounds in another loss to the Celtics.

=== Milwaukee Bucks (2015–2017) ===
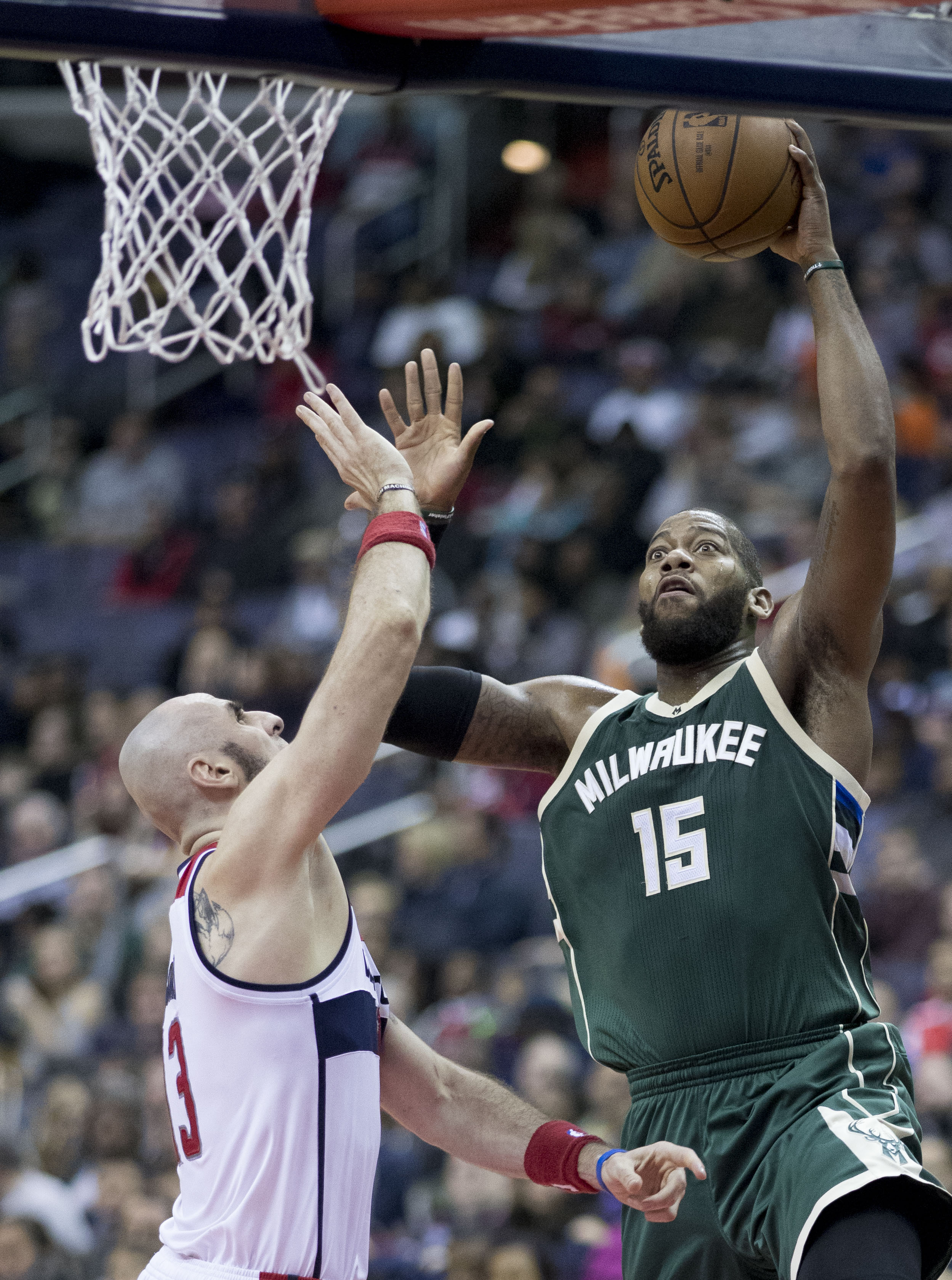
Monroe with the Bucks in December 2016

On July 9, 2015, Monroe signed a three-year, $50 million contract with the Milwaukee Bucks. He made his debut for the Bucks in their season opener on October 28, 2015, recording 22 points and 14 rebounds in a 122–97 loss to the New York Knicks. Between February 9 and March 7, 2016, Monroe had a 12-game bench stint as head coach Jason Kidd tinkered with his line-up. In his first game coming off the bench, he recorded a season-high 29 points and 12 rebounds in a 112–111 win over the Boston Celtics. Monroe returned to the starting line-up on March 9 for the Bucks' game against the Miami Heat.

Monroe was assigned a permanent bench role for the Bucks in 2016–17 by Kidd. On January 25, 2017, he led the Bucks with a season-high 28 points in a 114–109 loss to the Philadelphia 76ers.

=== Phoenix Suns (2017–2018) ===
On November 7, 2017, Monroe was traded, along with the rights to a protected future first-round pick and a 2018 protected second-round pick, to the Phoenix Suns in exchange for Eric Bledsoe. He was dealing with a left calf strain upon arriving in Phoenix. He made his debut for the Suns on November 16, 2017, recording 20 points and 11 rebounds in 26 minutes as a starter in a 142–116 loss to the Houston Rockets. Monroe played amid speculation that he could be traded or have his contract bought out. Six days later, he had 22 points and 15 rebounds in a 113–107 overtime loss to his former team, the Milwaukee Bucks. On January 24, 2018, he had 16 points and a season-high 17 rebounds in a 116–101 loss to the Indiana Pacers. On February 1, 2018, he was waived by the Suns.

=== Boston Celtics (2018) ===
On February 8, 2018, Monroe signed with the Boston Celtics. On April 6, 2018, he recorded his second career triple-double with 19 points, 11 rebounds and 10 assists off the bench in a 111–104 win over the Chicago Bulls. He became the first Celtics center to record a triple-double since Robert Parish did it on March 29, 1987.

=== Toronto Raptors (2018–2019) ===
On August 10, 2018, Monroe signed with the Toronto Raptors. On February 7, 2019, Monroe was traded to the Brooklyn Nets with a 2021 second-round pick in exchange for cash considerations. He was immediately waived by the Nets.

=== Boston Celtics (2019) ===
On March 24, 2019, Monroe signed a 10-day contract with the Boston Celtics. He was not re-signed by the Celtics upon the expiration of his 10-day contract.

=== Philadelphia 76ers (2019) ===
On April 4, 2019, Monroe signed with the Philadelphia 76ers.

=== Bayern Munich (2019–2020) ===
On July 25, 2019, Monroe signed with Bayern Munich of the German Basketball Bundesliga (BBL) and EuroLeague for the 2019–20 season.

=== Khimki (2020–2021) ===
On July 30, 2020, Monroe signed with Russian club Khimki of the VTB United League and the EuroLeague for the 2020–21 season. He was named league player of the week on November 11, after contributing 28 points and ten rebounds in an 86–78 win against PBC CSKA Moscow. On January 23, 2021, Khimki terminated Monroe's contract.

=== 2021–22 season ===
On November 5, 2021, Monroe signed with the Capital City Go-Go of the NBA G League. He averaged 10.4 points and 8.8 rebounds per game.

On December 27, 2021, Monroe signed a 10-day deal with the Minnesota Timberwolves. He played his first game against the Boston Celtics and contributed 11 points, 9 rebounds, and 6 assists in the Wolves' 108–103 victory.

On January 6, 2022, Monroe signed a 10-day contract with the Washington Wizards. Monroe appeared in two games for the Wizards before his contract expired and he returned to Capital City.

On February 5, 2022, Monroe signed a 10-day contract with the Milwaukee Bucks. The same day, he scored six points and grabbed six rebounds in 15 minutes of playing time in his debut, during a 137–108 win over the Portland Trail Blazers. Ten days later, he was reacquired by the Capital City Go-Go.

On March 28, 2022, Monroe signed a 10-day deal with the Utah Jazz.

On April 7, 2022, Monroe signed with the Minnesota Timberwolves for the remainder of the 2021–22 season.

=== Shanxi Loongs (2022–2023) ===
On December 10, 2022, Monroe signed with the Shanxi Loongs of the Chinese Basketball Association. He and the team parted ways on January 21, 2023.

=== Osos de Manatí (2023) ===
On March 18, 2023, Monroe signed with Osos de Manatí of the Baloncesto Superior Nacional (BSN).

== Coaching career ==
On September 26, 2024, Monroe retired from professional basketball and was hired by the New Orleans Pelicans as a player development coach.

== Career statistics ==
Legend
GP	Games played	GS	Games started	MPG	Minutes per game
FG%	Field-goal percentage	3P%	3-point field-goal percentage	FT%	Free-throw percentage
RPG	Rebounds per game	APG	Assists per game	SPG	Steals per game
BPG	Blocks per game	PPG	Points per game	PIR	Performance index rating
**Bold**	Career high

=== NBA ===
*	Led the league

==== Regular season ====
Year	Team	GP	GS	MPG	FG%	3P%	FT%	RPG	APG	SPG	BPG	PPG
2010–11	Detroit	80	48	27.8	.551	.000	.622	7.5	1.3	1.2	.6	9.4
2011–12	Detroit	66*	66*	31.5	.521	.000	.739	9.7	2.3	**1.3**	.7	15.4
2012–13	Detroit	81	81	**33.2**	.486	.000	.689	9.6	3.5	**1.3**	.7	**16.0**
2013–14	Detroit	**82**	**82***	32.8	.497	.000	.657	9.3	2.1	1.1	.6	15.2
2014–15	Detroit	69	57	31.0	.496	—	.750	**10.2**	2.1	1.1	.5	15.9
2015–16	Milwaukee	79	67	29.3	.522	.000	.740	8.8	2.3	.9	.8	15.3
2016–17	Milwaukee	81	0	22.5	.534	.000	.741	6.6	2.3	1.1	.5	11.7
2017–18	Milwaukee	5	0	15.8	.485	—	.500	5.0	1.0	0	0	6.8
2017–18	Phoenix	20	14	23.3	.626	—	.674	8.0	2.5	.8	.3	11.3
2017–18	Boston	26	0	19.1	.530	—	.797	6.3	2.3	1.1	.7	10.2
2018–19	Toronto	38	2	11.1	.460	.000	.574	4.1	.4	.3	.2	4.8
2018–19	Boston	2	0	2.5	.600	—	—	1.5	.5	.0	.0	3.0
2018–19	Philadelphia	3	0	17.3	.653	**1.000**	**.909**	4.3	2.3	.3	.0	13.7
2021–22	Minnesota	4	0	20.3	.591	—	.429	6.0	**4.0**	1.0	**1.5**	7.3
2021–22	Washington	2	0	9.0	.500	—	—	5.0	.5	.5	.5	4.0
2021–22	Milwaukee	5	0	17.3	.500	—	.556	4.2	.4	.6	.4	5.4
2021–22	Utah	3	0	8.3	**.800**	—	.571	3.0	1.0	.0	.3	4.0
Career		646	417	27.4	.514	.059	.703	8.2	2.1	1.1	.6	13.0

==== Playoffs ====
Year	Team	GP	GS	MPG	FG%	3P%	FT%	RPG	APG	SPG	BPG	PPG
2017	Milwaukee	6	0	**23.5**	**.529**	—	**.833**	**7.3**	**1.7**	**1.3**	**.5**	**13.2**
2018	Boston	**11**	0	9.5	.500	—	.682	3.2	.5	.2	.2	4.8
2019	Philadelphia	10	**1**	9.0	.400	**.250**	.788	3.1	.4	.5	.4	4.0
2022	Minnesota	2	0	3.6	.400	—	—	1.0	.5	1.0	.0	2.0
Career		29	1	11.8	.478	.250	.770	3.9	.7	.6	.3	6.1

=== EuroLeague ===
*	Led the league

Year	Team	GP	GS	MPG	FG%	3P%	FT%	RPG	APG	SPG	BPG	PPG	PIR
2019–20	Bayern Munich	**28***	**24**	**24.1**	**.523**	—	**.747**	**6.8**	**2.5**	**1.3**	.6	**12.9**	**16.8**
2020–21	Khimki	9	5	20.1	.500	.000	.711	6.0	1.4	.6	**.7**	10.3	12.8
Career		37	29	23.2	.519	.000	.737	6.6	2.3	1.1	.6	12.3	15.8

=== College ===
Year	Team	GP	GS	MPG	FG%	3P%	FT%	RPG	APG	SPG	BPG	PPG
2008–09	Georgetown	31	31	30.9	**.570**	**.333**	**.700**	6.6	2.6	**1.8**	1.4	12.7
2009–10	Georgetown	**34**	**33**	**34.2**	.525	.259	.660	**9.7**	**3.7**	1.2	**1.5**	**16.2**
Career		65	64	32.6	.542	.273	.677	8.2	3.2	1.5	1.5	14.5

== See also ==
- 2010 NCAA Men's Basketball All-Americans
