= Malachi Richardson =

American basketball player (born 1996)

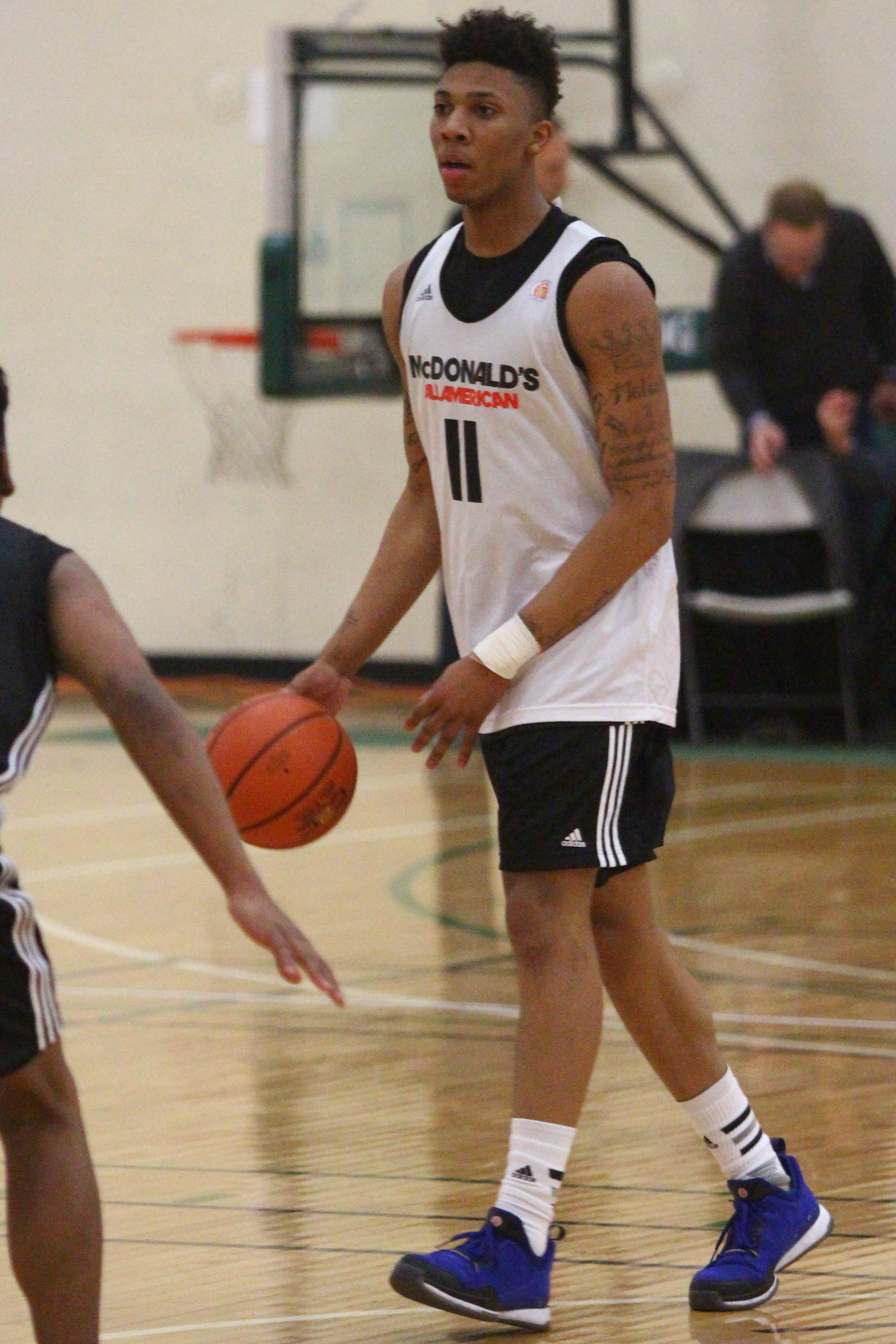
- Richardson in the McDonald's All-American Game closed practice in March 2015

Free agent
- Position: Shooting guard / small forward

Personal information
- Born: January 5, 1996 (age 30) Trenton, New Jersey, U.S.
- Listed height: 6 ft 6 in (1.98 m)
- Listed weight: 205 lb (93 kg)

Career information
- High school: Trenton Catholic Academy (Hamilton, New Jersey)
- College: Syracuse (2015–2016)
- NBA draft: 2016: 1st round, 22nd overall pick
- Drafted by: Charlotte Hornets
- Playing career: 2016–present

Career history
- 2016–2018: Sacramento Kings
- 2016–2018: →Reno Bighorns
- 2018–2019: Toronto Raptors
- 2018–2019: →Raptors 905
- 2019: Hapoel Holon
- 2019–2020: Vanoli Cremona
- 2021: Canton Charge
- 2021: Lavoropiù Fortitudo Bologna
- 2021–2022: Wilki Morskie Szczecin
- 2022–2023: GTK Gliwice
- 2023: Indios de Mayagüez
- 2023–2024: Pelita Jaya
- 2024–2025: Astros de Jalisco

Career highlights
- ACC All-Freshman team (2016); McDonald's All-American (2015); First-team Parade All-American (2015)
- Stats at NBA.com
- Stats at Basketball Reference

Malachi Lewis Richardson (born January 5, 1996) is an American professional basketball player who last played for the Astros de Jalisco of the Liga Nacional de Baloncesto Profesional (LNBP). He played one season of college basketball for Syracuse before being selected by the Charlotte Hornets with the 22nd overall pick in the 2016 NBA draft.

== High school and college career ==
Richardson attended Trenton Catholic Academy his freshman year, then spent his sophomore year at Roselle Catholic High School before returning to Trenton Catholic for his junior and senior years, to team back up with coach Fred Falchi, who came out of retirement to coach. In his high school career at Trenton Catholic Academy, Malachi scored a total 1,245 points, averaging 19.2 points in his junior year and 18.7 in his senior year. Richardson was rated as a four-star recruit and ranked the 23rd overall recruit and fifth-best shooting guard in the 2015 high school class.

Richardson played one season of college basketball for Syracuse, averaging 13.4 points, 4.3 rebounds and 2.1 assists per game. Richardson was also named to the ACC All-Freshman team. On April 18, 2016, he declared for the NBA draft, forgoing his final three years of college eligibility.

College recruiting information
Name	Hometown	School	Height	Weight	Commit date
Malachi Richardson; SG	Hamilton, NJ	Trenton Catholic Academy	6 ft 6 in (1.98 m)	190 lb (86 kg)	Dec 13, 2013
Malachi Richardson; SG	Recruit ratings: Scout: Rivals: (95)				
Overall recruit ranking: ESPN: 23
Note: In many cases, Scout, Rivals, 247Sports, On3, and ESPN may conflict in their listings of height and weight.; In these cases, the average was taken. ESPN grades are on a 100-point scale.; Sources: "2015 Syracuse Signees". Rivals.; "2015 Syracuse Signees". Scout.; "2015 Syracuse Signees". ESPN.; "Scout.com Team Recruiting Rankings". Scout.; "2015 Team Ranking". Rivals.

== Professional career ==
=== Sacramento Kings (2016–2018) ===
On June 23, 2016, Richardson was selected by the Charlotte Hornets with the 22nd overall pick in the 2016 NBA draft. His rights were later traded to the Sacramento Kings on July 7, 2016, in exchange for Marco Belinelli. On July 15, 2016, he signed his rookie scale contract with the Kings. On February 16, 2017, he was ruled out for four to six weeks after suffering a partial thickness tear of his right hamstring the night before. He was later shut down for the remainder of the season on March 26, 2017. During his season-and-a-half with the Kings, he had multiple assignments with the Reno Bighorns of the NBA G League.

=== Toronto Raptors (2018–2019) ===
On February 8, 2018, Richardson was traded to the Toronto Raptors in exchange for Bruno Caboclo. On February 11, in Charlotte, he played in his first game with the Raptors. During the rest of the season, he received multiple assignments to Raptors 905, Toronto's G League affiliate.

On February 6, 2019, Richardson was traded to the Philadelphia 76ers, by whom he was waived the following day.

=== Hapoel Holon (2019) ===
On March 14, 2019, the Canton Charge of the NBA G League announced that they had added Richardson, but he did not make any appearances for the Charge.

On August 17, 2019, Richardson signed with Hapoel Holon of the Israeli Premier League for the 2019–20 season. On November 30, 2019, Richardson recorded a career-high 24 points, while shooting 6-of-7 from three-point range, along with five assists in a 109–95 win over Ironi Nahariya. In 15 games played for Holon, he averaged 11.6 points and 2 assists per game. On December 14, 2019, he parted ways with Holon.

=== Vanoli Cremona (2019–2020) ===
On December 16, 2019, Richardson signed with Vanoli Cremona in the Italian Lega Basket Serie A as a replacement for Vojislav Stojanović. However, he had an unfortunate experience in Cremona: one month after his debut with the team he fractured his right hand during the match against Virtus Roma on January 26. He underwent a surgery and was released from the team on February 11.

=== Canton Charge (2021) ===
For the 2020–21 season, Richardson joined the Canton Charge of the G League where he played 15 games, averaging 8.4 ppg while shooting 46% from beyond the arc.

=== Lavoropiù Fortitudo Bologna (2021) ===
On July 30, 2021, Richardson signed with Lavoropiù Fortitudo Bologna of the Lega Basket Serie A. After playing in six games averaging 10.3 points per game, he parted ways with the team on November 12.

=== Wilki Morskie Szczecin (2021–2022) ===
On November 16, 2021, Richardson signed with Wilki Morskie Szczecin of the Polish Basketball League (PLK).

=== GTK Gliwice (2022–2023) ===
On December 17, 2022, he signed with GTK Gliwice of the PLK.

=== Pelita Jaya (2023–2024) ===
In December 2023, Richardson signed with the Pelita Jaya of the Indonesian Basketball League (IBL).

=== Astros de Jalisco (2024) ===
In October 2024, Richardson signed with the Astros de Jalisco of the Liga Nacional de Baloncesto Profesional (LNBP).

== Career statistics ==
Legend
GP	Games played	GS	Games started	MPG	Minutes per game
FG%	Field goal percentage	3P%	3-point field goal percentage	FT%	Free throw percentage
RPG	Rebounds per game	APG	Assists per game	SPG	Steals per game
BPG	Blocks per game	PPG	Points per game	**Bold**	Career high

=== NBA ===
==== Regular season ====
Year	Team	GP	GS	MPG	FG%	3P%	FT%	RPG	APG	SPG	BPG	PPG
2016–17	Sacramento	22	0	9.0	.412	.286	.789	1.0	**.5**	.2	.0	**3.6**
2017–18	Sacramento	**25**	**4**	**12.8**	.330	.308	.773	**1.3**	**.5**	**.4**	.0	3.5
2017–18	Toronto	1	0	5.0	**.500**	.000	.000	1.0	.0	.0	.0	2.0
2018–19	Toronto	22	0	4.7	.310	**.320**	**.800**	.6	.0	.0	.0	1.4
Career		70	4	8.9	.358	.301	.783	1.0	.3	.2	.0	2.8

=== College ===
Year	Team	GP	GS	MPG	FG%	3P%	FT%	RPG	APG	SPG	BPG	PPG
2015–16	Syracuse	37	37	34.4	.369	.353	.720	4.3	2.1	1.1	.3	13.4
