= Bruno Caboclo =

Brazilian basketball player (born 1995)

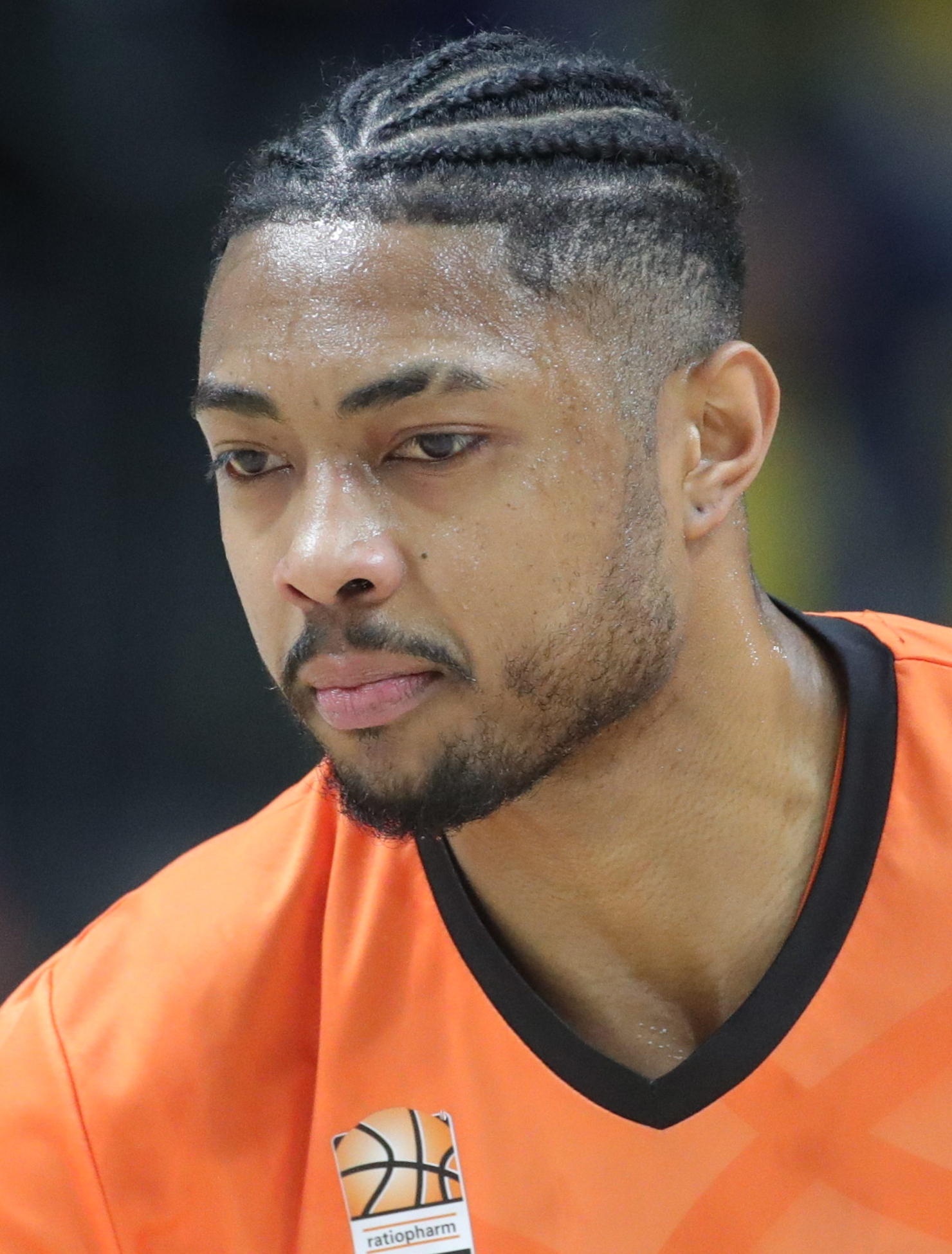
- Caboclo with Ratiopharm Ulm in 2023

No. 51 – Hapoel Tel Aviv
- Position: Power forward / center
- League: Israeli Basketball Premier League; EuroLeague

Personal information
- Born: September 21, 1995 (age 31) Osasco, Brazil
- Listed height: 6 ft 10 in (2.08 m)
- Listed weight: 225 lb (102 kg)

Career information
- NBA draft: 2014: 1st round, 20th overall pick
- Drafted by: Toronto Raptors
- Playing career: 2013–present

Career history
- 2013–2014: Pinheiros
- 2014–2018: Toronto Raptors
- 2014–2015: →Fort Wayne Mad Ants
- 2015–2018: →Raptors 905
- 2018: Sacramento Kings
- 2018: →Reno Bighorns
- 2018–2019: Rio Grande Valley Vipers
- 2019–2020: Memphis Grizzlies
- 2019–2020: →Memphis Hustle
- 2020–2021: Houston Rockets
- 2021: Limoges CSP
- 2021–2022: São Paulo
- 2022: Mexico City Capitanes
- 2023: Ratiopharm Ulm
- 2023–2024: Partizan
- 2024–2026: Hapoel Tel Aviv
- 2026: Dubai Basketball
- 2026–present: Hapoel Tel Aviv

Career highlights
- EuroCup champion (2025); FIBA Olympic Qualifying Tournament MVP – Latvia (2024); All-EuroCup Second Team (2023); Bundesliga champion (2023); All-Bundesliga First Team (2023); Basketball Champions League Americas blocks leader (2022); Basketball Champions League Americas field-goal percentage leader (2022); FIBA Champions League Americas champion (2022); FIBA Champions League Americas MVP (2022); FIBA Champions League Americas Finals MVP (2022); Brazilian League MVP (2022); All-Brazilian League Team (2022); NBA G League champion (2017)
- Stats at NBA.com
- Stats at Basketball Reference
Medals
Men's basketball
Representing Brazil
FIBA AmeriCup
Gold medal – first place	2025 Managua

Bruno Correa Fernandes Caboclo (born September 21, 1995) is a Brazilian professional basketball player for Hapoel Tel Aviv of the Israeli Basketball Premier League and the EuroLeague. He also plays for the Brazil national basketball team. He plays at the power forward and center positions.

After making his debut for Pinheiros in Brazil, Caboclo was drafted 20th overall by the Toronto Raptors in the 2014 NBA draft. He spent seven seasons in the National Basketball Association (NBA), playing for the Sacramento Kings, Memphis Grizzlies, and Houston Rockets.

== Early life ==
Born in Osasco, Caboclo was raised in Barueri and Pirapora do Bom Jesus in the state of São Paulo in Brazil. At age 13, he began playing basketball for Grêmio Recreativo Barueri, a social club in Barueri that invites children from local public schools to play sports.

In January 2013, Caboclo linked up with coach Rafael Franco at Score Academy in Raleigh, North Carolina. In his first game, against top-five-ranked junior college Vincennes University, the 6 ft 9 in (2.06 m) forward with an almost 7 ft 7 in (2.31 m) wingspan missed three-pointer after three-pointer. Coach Franco told Caboclo he had to be aggressive and had to rebound, and the scoring would come, and he was temporarily banned from shooting threes.

== Professional career ==
=== Pinheiros (2013–2014) ===
In April 2013, Caboclo returned to Brazil and signed with Pinheiros of the Novo Basquete Brasil (NBB) at 18 years of age. In 2013–14, he played 21 games, averaging 12.8 minutes, 5.0 points, and 2.8 rebounds per game, shooting 50.7% from the field.

=== Toronto Raptors (2014–2018) ===
On June 26, 2014, Caboclo was selected with the 20th overall pick in the 2014 NBA draft by the Toronto Raptors. During draft night, it was infamously reported by Fran Fraschilla during Caboclo's selection that Caboclo was "two years away from being two years away." On July 9, he signed with the Raptors and joined them for the 2014 NBA Summer League.

On November 21, Caboclo made his NBA debut against the Milwaukee Bucks. In 12 minutes of action, he recorded eight points, one rebound and one block in the 124–83 win. On December 25, Caboclo was assigned to the Fort Wayne Mad Ants of the NBA Development League. He was recalled by the Raptors on January 1, 2015, after appearing in three games for the Mad Ants while averaging 4.3 points, 2.7 rebounds and 13.0 minutes per game. Caboclo was reassigned to the Mad Ants on February 18, and recalled again on March 8. In 2014-15 with the Fort Wayne Mad Ants, he played 7 games and averaged 8.9 minutes, 3.4 points, and 1.9 rebounds per game. In 2014-15 with the Raptors, at 19 years of age, he played 8 games and in a total of 23.4 minutes scored 10 points while grabbing 2 rebounds and making one block.

In July 2015, Caboclo re-joined the Raptors for the 2015 NBA Summer League. On September 29, the Raptors exercised their third-year team option on Caboclo's rookie scale contract, extending the contract through the 2016–17 season. In 2015-16 with the Raptors 905 of the NBA Development League, he played 37 games and averaged 34.3 minutes, 14.7 points, 6.5 rebounds 1.7 assists, 1.1 steals, and 1.8 blocks per game. In 2015-16 with the Raptors, he played 6 games and in a total of 42.7 minutes scored 3 points while grabbing 2 rebounds, along with one assist and two steals, and making one block.

In 2016-17 with the Raptors 905, he played 34 games and averaged 27.1 minutes, 9.9 points, 5.4 rebounds 1.3 assists, 1.0 steals, and 1.2 blocks per game. In April 2017, Caboclo led Raptors 905 to the D-League Finals. In Game 3 of the series, Caboclo led the way with a game-high 31 points and 11 rebounds as Raptors 905 downed the Rio Grande Valley Vipers 122–96 to take the best-of-three series 2–1. In 2016-17 with the Raptors, he played 9 games and in a total of 40.3 minutes scored 14 points while grabbing 10 rebounds, along with 4 assists and two steals, and making one block.

In 2017-18 with the Raptors 905, he played 34 games and averaged 30.7 minutes, 14.4 points, 6.5 rebounds 1.3 assists, 1.3 steals, and 1.6 blocks per game, while shooting 83.1% from the free throw line. He played two games with the Raptors, in which he played a total of 6.7 minutes.

=== Sacramento Kings (2018) ===
On February 8, 2018, Caboclo was traded to the Sacramento Kings in exchange for Malachi Richardson. On March 23, he was assigned to the Reno Bighorns, Sacramento's G League affiliate , with whom in two games he played a total of 42.5 minutes in which he scored 19 points and had 11 rebounds, three assists, two steals, and one block. He was recalled two days later. He played 10 games with the Sacramento Kings and averaged 10.0 minutes, 2.6 points, and 2.1 rebounds per game.

=== Rio Grande Valley Vipers (2018–2019) ===
On August 20, 2018, Caboclo signed a training camp contract with the Houston Rockets. He was waived on October 13. He was then added to the training camp roster of the Rockets’ G League affiliate, the Rio Grande Valley Vipers. With the Vipers, in 28 games he averaged 28.3 minutes, 16.4 points, 7.3 rebounds, 1.3 assists, 1.4 steals, and 3.1 blocks (leading the league), while shooting 51.1% from the field and 43.3% from three-point range.

=== Memphis Grizzlies (2019–2020) ===
On January 24, 2019, Caboclo signed with the Memphis Grizzlies on a 10-day contract. On February 3, he signed a second 10-day contract. On February 13, Caboclo signed a multi-year contract with the Grizzlies. On March 25, he recorded his first double-double and scored a career-high 24 points against the Oklahoma City Thunder. In 2018-19 he played 34 games for Memphis, and averaged 23.5 minutes, 8.3 points, 4.6 rebounds, 1.5 assists, and 1.0 blocks per game, while shooting 84.0% from the free throw line.

Caboclo was assigned to the Memphis Hustle on January 13, 2020. In 2019-20 he played 2 games for the Hustle, and in 49.8 minutes had 23 points, 10 rebounds, 6 assists, 3 steals, and 6 blocks. He played 22 games for the Memphis Grizzlies, and averaged 8.7 minutes, 2.8 points, and 2.0 rebounds per game.

=== Houston Rockets (2020–2021) ===
On February 6, 2020, Caboclo was traded to the Houston Rockets in exchange for Jordan Bell. In the 2019-20 season he played 8 games for the Rockets, and averaged 6.5 minutes, 3.5 points, and 2.0 rebounds per game.

In the 2020-21 season he played 6 games for the Rockets, and in a total of 36.4 minutes scored 17 points and grabbed 14 rebounds, and had one assist and two blocks.

On January 13, 2021, Caboclo was waived by the Rockets.

=== Limoges CSP (2021) ===
On February 26, 2021 Limoges CSP officially announced signing Bruno Caboclo for the rest of the season. He played 19 games and averaged 22.2 minutes, 10.8 points, and 5.2 rebounds per game, while shooting 49.3% from the floor and 44.8% from three-point range.

=== São Paulo FC (2021–2022) ===
On August 12, 2021, Caboclo signed with São Paulo FC of the Novo Basquete Brasil (NBB). He won the 2021–22 BCL Americas championship with São Paulo, the team's first continental title.

Caboclo played 44 games overall and averaged 33.5 minutes, 18.4 points, 8.4 rebounds, and had the second-best averages in points (23.9) and rebounds (11.1) in the BCL Americas. Overall, he averaged 1.4 assists and 1.1 steals per game, shooting 52.8% from the field and 40.4% from three point range. He also led the competition in the BCL in blocks per game, with 3.6 (2.0 overall), field goal percentage (63.6%), and efficiency with 32.8 per game. In the final on April 10, 2022, Caboclo had a team-high 29 points, 7 rebounds, and 3 blocks. He was named the BCL Americas' season Most Valuable Player after the Tournament. Later, he was also named the MVP of the 2021–22 NBB season.

Following his successful year in Brazil, Caboclo participated in the 2022 NBA Summer League with the Utah Jazz.

On August 26, 2022, Caboclo signed with the Boston Celtics. He was waived on September 20.

=== Mexico City Capitanes (2022) ===
On November 4, 2022, Caboclo was named to the opening night roster for the Mexico City Capitanes of the NBA G League. He played in 18 games for the Capitanes, averaging 27.3 minutes, 14.9 points, 6.3 rebounds, 1.5 assists, and 2.3 blocks, while shooting 54.2% from the floor.

=== Ratiopharm Ulm (2023) ===
Caboclo in 2023

On January 5, 2023, Caboclo signed a multi-year deal, until the end of 2024, with Ratiopharm Ulm of the German Basketball Bundesliga (BBL). Caboclo was a key player on Ulm' 2023 German championship-winning team, averaging 25.8 points, 14,9 points, 6.3 rebounds, 1.0 assists, and 1.9 blocks (leading the league) in 30 Bundesliga games, while shooting 57.9% from the field and 80.4% from the free throw line.• He was second in the EuroCup in blocks per game, third in points per game, and fourth in rebounds per game. • Field-goal percentage (61.5%): Top 10 among qualified players Overall, in 41 games he averaged 26.2 minutes, 15.6 points, 6.9 rebounds, 0.9 assists, and 1.8 blocks per game, while shooting 58.9% from the field. Afterwards he activated a release clause in his contract.

=== Umana Reyer Venezia (2023) ===
On June 30, 2023, Caboclo put pen to paper on a contract with Umana Reyer Venezia of the Italian Serie A. However, on September 18 his representatives notified Venezia that he would not join the team for "personal reasons." Instead, Caboclo joined Israeli club Maccabi Ra'anana for an October 2023 NBA three-game preseason exhibition tour. The following month, after receiving clearance from the FIBA, he signed with Partizan Belgrade.

=== Partizan Belgrade (2023–2024) ===
On November 7, 2023, Caboclo signed a contract with the Serbian team Partizan Belgrade. Over the 2023–24 season, Caboclo averaged 19.4 minutes, 9.4 points, and 4.0 rebounds on 63.7% shooting from the field and 50.0% shooting from three-point range in 27 EuroLeague games for Partizan. In total, in 58 games he averaged 17.3 minutes, 8.8 points, and 4.0 rebounds per game, while shooting 64.0% from the floor and 49.3% from three-point range. In June 2024, Caboclo left the club to attend a child custody hearing relating to his child in the United States without the club's approval in the midst of the Serbian League playoffs series; his agent had requested permission, but the club had denied it. The club's president later said that despite that, Caboclo would stay with the team for the next season as well, though that did not happen. He was named All-Eurocup Second Team.

=== Hapoel Tel Aviv (2024–2026) ===
On August 30, 2024, Caboclo signed with Hapoel Tel Aviv B.C. of the Israeli Basketball Premier League. He played 42 games and averaged 18.2 minutes, 8.9 points, and 4.4 rebounds per game, while shooting 57.7% from the floor and 41.7% from three-point range.

On October 9, 2025, it was announced that Caboclo would miss multiple months after undergoing surgery to repair a herniated disc in his back.

=== Dubai Basketball (2026) ===
On January 15, 2026, Caboclo left Hapoel and signed with Dubai Basketball of the ABA League and the EuroLeague. He played 26 games and averaged 13.4 minutes, 5.6 points, and 3.1 rebounds per game, while shooting 65.5% from the floor and 68.6% from three-point range.

=== Return to Hapoel Tel Aviv (2026–present) ===
On September 3, 2026, Caboclo returned to Hapoel Tel Aviv.

== National team career ==
Caboclo has played for the senior Brazilian national basketball team. With Brazil, he played at the 2017 FIBA AmeriCup, at the 2019 FIBA Basketball World Cup, and the 2023 FIBA Basketball World Cup.

Caboclo also played with Brazil at the 2024 Olympics in Paris. In their third group game, he scored 33 points, on 13-for-19 shooting, and grabbed 17 rebounds against Japan. He became the first player to have more than 30 points and 15 rebounds in an Olympic game since Clifford Luyk in 1972. His efficiency of 43 was the second highest since counting began in 2016, only trailing Luka Dončić' 49 in 2020. He was named MVP of the 2024 Olympic Qualifier - Latvia, to the All-Tournament Team 2024 Olympic Qualifier - Latvia, and to the A-Tournament Team 2025 FIBA AmeriCup.

== Career statistics ==
Legend
GP	Games played	GS	Games started	MPG	Minutes per game
FG%	Field-goal percentage	3P%	3-point field-goal percentage	FT%	Free-throw percentage
RPG	Rebounds per game	APG	Assists per game	SPG	Steals per game
BPG	Blocks per game	PPG	Points per game	PIR	Performance index rating
**Bold**	Career high

=== NBA ===
==== Regular season ====
Year	Team	GP	GS	MPG	FG%	3P%	FT%	RPG	APG	SPG	BPG	PPG
2014–15	Toronto	8	0	2.9	.333	**.667**	—	.3	—	—	.1	1.3
2015–16	Toronto	6	1	7.2	.083	.143	—	.3	.2	.3	.2	0.5
2016–17	Toronto	9	0	4.4	.375	.333	—	1.1	.4	.2	.1	1.6
2017–18	Toronto	2	0	3.5	.000	.000	—	.5	.5	.5	—	0.0
2017–18	Sacramento	10	0	10.0	.310	.200	.833	2.1	.3	.2	.4	2.6
2018–19	Memphis	**34**	**19**	**23.5**	.427	.369	.840	**4.6**	**1.5**	.4	**1.0**	**8.3**
2019–20	Memphis	22	0	8.7	.406	.160	.667	2.0	.5	.5	.5	2.8
2019–20	Houston	8	0	6.5	**.500**	.250	**1.000**	2.0	.2	**.6**	.6	3.5
2020–21	Houston	6	0	6.0	.471	.000	.500	2.3	.2	—	.3	2.8
Career		105	20	12.3	.403	.308	.836	2.6	.7	.3	.6	4.2

==== Playoffs ====
Year	Team	GP	GS	MPG	FG%	3P%	FT%	RPG	APG	SPG	BPG	PPG
2020	Houston	2	0	3.5	.500	.000	—	1.5	—	.5	—	1.0
Career		2	0	3.5	.500	.000	—	1.5	—	.5	—	1.0

=== EuroLeague ===
Year	Team	GP	GS	MPG	FG%	3P%	FT%	RPG	APG	SPG	BPG	PPG	PIR
2023–24	Partizan	27	19	19.4	.637	.500	.736	4.0	.2	.6	.7	9.4	10.5
Career		27	19	19.4	.637	.500	.736	4.0	.2	.6	.7	9.4	10.5

=== EuroCup ===
Year	Team	GP	GS	MPG	FG%	3P%	FT%	RPG	APG	SPG	BPG	PPG	PIR
2022–23	ratiopharm Ulm	11	10	27.5	.615	.304	.708	7.8	.8	.5	1.5	17.4	19.6
Career		11	10	27.5	.615	.304	.708	7.8	.8	.5	1.5	17.4	19.6

=== Basketball Champions League Americas ===
†	Denotes season in which Caboclo won the BCL Americas
*	Led the league

Year	Team	GP	GS	MPG	FG%	3P%	FT%	RPG	APG	SPG	BPG	PPG
2021–22†	São Paulo	9	9	36.2*	.636*	.531	.810	11.1	1.1	1.1	3.6*	23.9
Career		9	9	36.2	.636	.531	.810	11.1	1.1	1.1	3.6	23.9

=== FIBA Americas League ===
Year	Team	GP	GS	MPG	FG%	3P%	FT%	RPG	APG	SPG	BPG	PPG
2013–14	Pinheiros	17	5	13.2	.464	.304	.733	3.1	.2	.4	.8	4.8
Career		17	5	13.2	.464	.304	.733	3.1	.2	.4	.8	4.8

=== Domestic leagues ===
Year	Team	League	GP	MPG	FG%	3P%	FT%	RPG	APG	SPG	BPG	PPG
2013–14	(Brazil) Pinheiros	NBB	17	13.2	.464	.304	.733	3.1	.2	.4	.8	4.8
2014–15	(United States) Fort Wayne Mad Ants	D-League	7	8.9	.290	.333	1.000	1.9	—	.1	.7	3.4
2015–16	(United States) Raptors 905	D-League	37	34.3	.403	.335	.727	6.5	1.7	1.1	1.8	14.7
2016–17	(United States) Raptors 905	D-League	34	27.1	.412	.331	.655	5.4	1.3	1.0	1.2	9.9
2017–18	(United States) Raptors 905	G League	34	30.7	.396	.335	.831	6.5	1.3	1.3	1.6	14.4
2017–18	(United States) Reno Bighorns	G League	2	21.3	.467	.500	—	5.5	1.5	1.0	.5	9.5
2018–19	(United States) R. G. Valley Vipers	G League	28	28.3	.511	.433	.744	7.3	1.6	1.4	3.1	16.4
2019–20	(United States) Memphis Hustle	G League	2	24.9	.529	.167	1.000	5.0	3.0	1.5	3.0	11.5
2020–21	(France) Limoges CSP	LNB Élite	19	22.2	.493	.448	.651	5.2	.8	.5	.6	10.8
2021–22	(Brazil) São Paulo	NBB	35	32.8	.495	.361	.693	7.7	1.4	1.1	1.7	16.8
2022–23	(Mexico) C. de C. de México	G League	2	29.3	.429	.333	.667	5.0	1.5	—	2.5	12.0
2022–23	(Germany) ratiopharm Ulm	BBL	30	25.8	.579	.286	.804	6.3	1.0	.9	1.9	14.9
2023–24	(Serbia) Partizan	ABA	28	14.5	.622	.500	.750	3.7	.4	.6	.8	7.7
2023–24	(Serbia) Partizan	KLS	3	25.0	.750	.333	.667	5.3	.3	—	1.3	13.0
