= 2016 NBA Summer League =

- League: National Basketball Association
- Sport: Basketball
- Duration: July 2–18, 2016
- Games: 98 total games Orlando-25; Utah-6; Las Vegas-67
- Teams: Orlando-10; Utah-4; Las Vegas-24
- TV partner(s): NBA TV & ESPN

Orlando Pro Summer League
- Season champions: Orlando Magic (White)
- Runners-up: Detroit Pistons
- Season MVP: Arinze Onuaku
- Top scorer: Cameron Payne

Las Vegas NBA Summer League
- Season champions: Chicago Bulls
- Runners-up: Minnesota Timberwolves
- Top seed: Toronto Raptors
- Season MVP: Tyus Jones (league); Jerian Grant (championship game)
- Top scorer: Trey Lyles

Utah Jazz Summer League
- Season champions: Boston Celtics
- Runners-up: San Antonio Spurs
- Season MVP: Denzel Valentine

NBA Summer League seasons
- ← 2015 2017 →

The 2016 NBA Summer League consisted of three pro basketball leagues organized by the National Basketball Association (NBA): the Orlando Pro Summer League, Utah Jazz Summer League, and Las Vegas Summer League.

Ten teams participated in the week-long Orlando Pro Summer League at Amway Center in Orlando, Florida, from July 2 to 8, 2016. The Orlando Magic (White) won the Orlando Pro Summer League championship over the Detroit Pistons, 87–84 in overtime. Arinze Onuaku of Orlando Magic (White) was named the MVP. The Dallas Mavericks and Miami Heat also participated in the Las Vegas Summer League.

The Utah Jazz Summer League was introduced for the first time last year, marking the first summer league to be played in Utah since the Rocky Mountain Revue was last held in 2008. Four teams participated in a round-robin format from July 4 to 7, 2016. No tournament was held, nor was there a champion named, but the Boston Celtics had the best record of the four teams with an undefeated record of 3–0. All four teams (Utah Jazz, Boston Celtics, Philadelphia 76ers, and San Antonio Spurs) also participated in the Las Vegas Summer League.

The Las Vegas NBA Summer League is the official summer league of the National Basketball Association. It is the premier summer league of the three, with a total of 23 teams, plus a Select Team from the NBA Development League, participating. A total of 67 games were played from July 8 to 18, 2016, at the Thomas & Mack Center and Cox Pavilion, both located in Paradise, Nevada (near Las Vegas). The Chicago Bulls won the championship by defeating the Minnesota Timberwolves in the final, 84–82, on a buzzer-beater by Denzel Valentine in overtime. Tyus Jones was named the league's Most Valuable Player, with Jerian Grant of the Bulls being named the championship game MVP.

== Orlando Pro Summer League ==
Officially known as the Southwest Airlines Orlando Pro Summer League for sponsorship reasons, this 25-game, week-long event will feature ten teams. Each team will play five games over the course of the week, with a championship day being played on the final day of the league. A point system will establish the standings leading up to the final day, with eight points awarded each game based on: four points for winning the game and one point for winning a quarter (in the event of a tied quarter, each team will receive 0.5 points). In the event of ties in seeding heading into championship day, three tiebreakers will be in place: 1) total point differential; 2) total points allowed; 3) coin flip.

=== Teams ===
- Orlando Magic White (host)
- Orlando Magic Blue (host)
- Charlotte Hornets
- Dallas Mavericks
- Detroit Pistons
- Indiana Pacers
- Los Angeles Clippers
- Miami Heat
- New York Knicks
- Oklahoma City Thunder

=== Orlando Schedule ===
All times are in Eastern Daylight Time (UTC−4)

==== Day 1 ====
NBA TV

July 2
9:00 am

Boxscore

Oklahoma City Thunder 86, Dallas Mavericks 85
Scoring by quarter: 21–24, 27–20, 17–19, 21–22
| Pts: Cameron Payne 16; Rebs: Dakari Johnson 9 Asts: Christon, Payne 4 | Pts: Andre Dawkins 16; Rebs: Ashley, Jefferson 11; Asts: Darius Adams 7 |

Amway Center, Orlando, Florida
Referees: Lauren Holtkamp, Greg Danridge, Jacob Barnett

NBA TV

July 2
11:00 am

Boxscore

Charlotte Hornets 74, Orlando Magic White 79
Scoring by quarter: 16–21, 15–20, 15–21, 28–17
| Pts: Deshaun Thomas 19; Rebs: James Kelly 9 Asts: three players 2 | Pts: Arinze Onuaku 16; Rebs: Arinze Onuaku 8 Asts: Brandon Fields 4 |

Amway Center, Orlando, Florida
Referees: Tyler Ricks, Nate Anderson, Tom Mauer, Mitchell Ervin

NBA TV

July 2
1:00 pm

Boxscore

Orlando Magic Blue 66, Indiana Pacers 93
Scoring by quarter: 20–29, 16–26, 14–20, 16–18
| Pts: Devyn Marble 12; Rebs: Anderson, Poirier 5 Asts: Nick Johnson 8 | Pts: Joe Young 22; Rebs: Georges Niang 12; Asts: Georges Niang 5 |

Amway Center, Orlando, Florida
Referees: Dedric Taylor, Nate Green, Brandon Parker

NBA TV

July 2
3:00 pm

Boxscore

New York Knicks 49, Detroit Pistons 81
Scoring by quarter: 15–18, 12–20, 9–21, 13–22
| Pts: DaJuan Summers 12; Rebs: Louis Labeyrie 6 Asts: Souleyman Diabate 4 | Pts: Stanley Johnson 15; Rebs: Phil Pressey 10; Asts: Michael Gbinije 5 |

Amway Center, Orlando, Florida
Referees: Kevin Scott, Nelson Santiago, Ryan Sassano

NBA TV

July 2
5:00 pm

Boxscore

Miami Heat 91, Los Angeles Clippers 71
Scoring by quarter: 25–23, 23–12, 25–19, 18–17
| Pts: Justise Winslow 21; Rebs: Norvel Pelle 7 Asts: Richardson, Winslow 4 | Pts: Branden Dawson 14; Rebs: Branden Dawson 7 Asts: David Michineau 3 |

Amway Center, Orlando, Florida
Referees: Kevin Cutler, Jonathan Sterling, Chris Merlo

==== Day 2 ====
NBA TV

July 3
1:00 pm

Boxscore

Indiana Pacers 70, Charlotte Hornets 80
Scoring by quarter: 18–19, 14–14, 21–23, 17–24
| Pts: Glenn Robinson III 16; Rebs: Shayne Whittington 7 Asts: three players 3 | Pts: Gabe York 18; Rebs: Wayne Blackshear 8 Asts: Aaron Harrison 6 |

Amway Center, Orlando, Florida
Referees: Jacob Barnett, Chris Pasci, Lauren Holtkamp

NBA TV

July 3
3:00 pm

Boxscore

Miami Heat 74, New York Knicks 48
Scoring by quarter: 17–9, 21–12, 23–9, 13–18
| Pts: Juwan Howard Jr. 17; Rebs: Kevin Tumba 7 Asts: Brianté Weber 6 | Pts: Ron Baker 12; Rebs: Marshall Plumlee 7 Asts: Souleyman Diabate 4 |

Amway Center, Orlando, Florida
Referees: Saif Esho, Karleena Tobin, Kevin Scott

NBA TV

July 3
5:00 pm

Boxscore

Los Angeles Clippers 72, Oklahoma City Thunder 81
Scoring by quarter: 17–15, 15–19, 21–20, 19–27
| Pts: Brice Johnson 23; Rebs: Andrew Andrews 10; Asts: David Michineau 9 | Pts: Cameron Payne 25; Rebs: Dakari Johnson 12; Asts: Wilbekin, Williams 3 |

Amway Center, Orlando, Florida
Referees: William Mensah, Natalie Sago, Chris Merlo

==== Day 3 ====
NBA TV

July 4
1:00 pm

Boxscore

Dallas Mavericks 85, Orlando Magic White 92
Scoring by quarter: 19–27, 21–22, 21–20, 24–23
| Pts: Vander Blue 23; Rebs: Casey Prather 10; Asts: Marquis Teague 5 | Pts: Fields, Graham 14; Rebs: Arinze Onuaku 9 Asts: Dentmon, Garino 5 |

Amway Center, Orlando, Florida
Referees: Jonathan Sterling, William Mensah, Ryan Sassano, Mitchell Ervin, Greg Danridge, Brandon Parker

NBA TV

July 4
3:00 pm

Boxscore

Orlando Magic Blue 68, Detroit Pistons 73
Scoring by quarter: 18–19, 10–13, 20–17, 20–24
| Pts: Nick Johnson 19; Rebs: Vincent Poirier 11; Asts: Nick Johnson 4 | Pts: Lorenzo Brown 19; Rebs: Stanley Johnson 10; Asts: Lorenzo Brown 2 |

Amway Center, Orlando, Florida
Referees: Dedric Taylor, Natalie Sago, Wesley Ford, Karleena Tobin

NBA TV

July 4
5:00 pm

Boxscore

Charlotte Hornets 78, Oklahoma City Thunder 74
Scoring by quarter: 20–11, 21–22, 18–16, 19–25
| Pts: Aaron Harrison 19; Rebs: Brandon Paul 11; Asts: Aaron Harrison 4 | Pts: Semaj Christon 23; Rebs: Kameron Woods 8 Asts: Semaj Christon 6 |

Amway Center, Orlando, Florida
Referees: Jonathan Sterling, William Mensah, Ryan Sassano

==== Day 4 ====
NBA TV

July 5
1:00 pm

Boxscore

Orlando Magic Blue 68, Miami Heat 84
Scoring by quarter: 26–24, 16–24, 14–19, 12–17
| Pts: Johnson, Zimmerman 10; Rebs: Stephen Zimmerman 10; Asts: Nick Johnson 8 | Pts: Josh Richardson 22; Rebs: Brianté Weber 10; Asts: Richardson, Weber 6 |

Amway Center, Orlando, Florida
Referees: Lauren Holtkamp, Mitchell Ervin, Chris Merlo

NBA TV

July 5
3:00 pm

Boxscore

Los Angeles Clippers 84, New York Knicks 92 (OT)
Scoring by quarter: 24–20, 20–24, 25–17, 15–23, Overtime: 0–8
| Pts: Brice Johnson 23; Rebs: Royce O'Neale 9 Asts: David Michineau 7 | Pts: Chasson Randle 24; Rebs: Marshall Plumlee 6 Asts: Chasson Randle 5 |

Amway Center, Orlando, Florida
Referees: Nate Green, Nelson Santiago, Kevin Scott

NBA TV

July 5
5:00 pm

Boxscore

Detroit Pistons 80, Indiana Pacers 76
Scoring by quarter: 20–25, 18–14, 19–14, 23–23
| Pts: Stanley Johnson 16; Rebs: three players 5 Asts: Lorenzo Brown 4 | Pts: Glenn Robinson III 20; Rebs: Christmas, Robinson III 7 Asts: Joe Young 5 |

Amway Center, Orlando, Florida
Referees: Dedric Taylor, Jonathan Sterling, Tyler Ricks

==== Day 5 ====
NBA TV

July 6
1:00 pm

Boxscore

Orlando Magic White 95, New York Knicks 90
Scoring by quarter: 23–20, 23–17, 20–25, 29–28
| Pts: Treveon Graham 19; Rebs: Arinze Onuaku 13; Asts: three players 3 | Pts: Ron Baker 22; Rebs: Ron Baker 9 Asts: Ron Baker 5 |

Amway Center, Orlando, Florida
Referees: Brandon Parker, Greg Danridge, Lauren Holtkamp

NBA TV

July 6
3:00 pm

Boxscore

Dallas Mavericks 84, Charlotte Hornets 81
Scoring by quarter: 15–17, 23–15, 16–24, 30–25
| Pts: Darius Adams 25; Rebs: Cory Jefferson 8 Asts: Darius Adams 6 | Pts: Brandon Paul 17; Rebs: Mike Tobey 14; Asts: Tim Quarterman 4 |

Amway Center, Orlando, Florida
Referees: Kevin Cutler, Tim Greene, Saif Esho

NBA TV

July 6
5:00 pm

Boxscore

Indiana Pacers 71, Oklahoma City Thunder 89
Scoring by quarter: 20–18, 18–24, 9–22, 24–25
| Pts: Johnson, Robinson III 12; Rebs: Glenn Robinson III 6 Asts: Joe Young 4 | Pts: Cameron Payne 19; Rebs: Dakari Johnson 9 Asts: Cameron Payne 6 |

Amway Center, Orlando, Florida
Referees: Brent Barnaky, Tyler Ricks, Ryan Sassano

==== Day 6 ====
NBA TV

July 7
1:00 pm

Boxscore

Dallas Mavericks 94, Orlando Magic Blue 96
Scoring by quarter: 28–29, 30–27, 17–20, 19–20
| Pts: Vander Blue 17; Rebs: Tyler Honeycutt 13; Asts: Marquis Teague 5 | Pts: Devyn Marble 21; Rebs: Okaro White 10; Asts: Nick Johnson 9 |

Amway Center, Orlando, Florida
Referees: Nate Anderson, Nick Buchert, Mitchell Ervin

NBA TV

July 7
3:00 pm

Boxscore

Los Angeles Clippers 69, Orlando Magic White 79
Scoring by quarter: 27–16, 19–22, 9–30, 14–11
| Pts: Brice Johnson 19; Rebs: Brice Johnson 8 Asts: Alex Hamilton 4 | Pts: Treveon Graham 24; Rebs: Arinze Onuaku 7 Asts: Justin Dentmon 4 |

Amway Center, Orlando, Florida
Referees: Dedric Taylor, Jonathan Sterling, Wesley Ford

NBA TV

July 7
5:00 pm

Boxscore

Detroit Pistons 71, Miami Heat 58
Scoring by quarter: 17–8, 20–12, 22–21, 12–17
| Pts: Stanley Johnson 20; Rebs: Stanley Johnson 9 Asts: Lorenzo Brown 3 | Pts: Rodney McGruder 14; Rebs: Rodney McGruder 8 Asts: Josh Richardson 4 |

Amway Center, Orlando, Florida
Referees: Kevin Scott, Nelson Santiago, Chris Pacsi

=== Championship day ===
Each team will play one game on the league's final day for either first, third, fifth, seventh or ninth place.

Seeding Criteria

The seeding will be determined by a team's total points after the first five days. Eight points will be awarded in each game: four points for winning a game and one point for every quarter a team won. In the event of a tied quarter, each team is awarded half a point. If two or more teams had equal points, then the following tiebreakers applied:

1. Total point differential
2. Least total points allowed
3. Coin flip

Each odd-numbered seed will be paired with the team seeded immediately below it. For example, the top two seeds will play in the championship game, the third and fourth seeds will play in the third-place game, etc.

==== Standings/seedings ====
| # | Team | GP | W | L | PTS | Tiebreaker Notes |
|---|---|---|---|---|---|---|
| 1 | Detroit Pistons | 4 | 4 | 0 | 28.5 | |
| 2 | Orlando Magic White | 4 | 4 | 0 | 26 | |
| 3 | Miami Heat | 4 | 3 | 1 | 23 | |
| 4 | Oklahoma City Thunder | 4 | 3 | 1 | 20 | |
| 5 | Charlotte Hornets | 4 | 2 | 2 | 16.5 | |
| 6 | Dallas Mavericks | 4 | 1 | 3 | 12 | |
| 7 | Indiana Pacers | 4 | 1 | 3 | 11 | |
| 8 | Orlando Magic Blue | 4 | 1 | 3 | 9 | |
| 9 | New York Knicks | 4 | 1 | 3 | 8 | |
| 10 | Los Angeles Clippers | 4 | 0 | 4 | 6 | |

==== Championship Day Schedule ====
All times are in Eastern Daylight Time (UTC−4)

===== Ninth Place Game =====
NBA TV

July 8
4:00 pm

Boxscore

Los Angeles Clippers 77, New York Knicks 106
Scoring by quarter: 15–26, 22–23, 20–27, 20–30
| Pts: Branden Dawson 18; Rebs: Johnson, Stone 7 Asts: Brice Johnson 4 | Pts: Ron Baker 20; Rebs: Louis Labeyrie 12; Asts: Chasson Randle 6 |

Amway Center, Orlando, Florida
Referees: Brent Barnaky, Jacob Barnett, Joe Prince, Tyler Ricks

===== Seventh Place Game =====
NBA TV

July 8
2:00 pm

Boxscore

Orlando Magic Blue 79, Indiana Pacers 85
Scoring by quarter: 11–24, 18–13, 19–27, 31–21
| Pts: Nick Johnson 20; Rebs: Okaro White 7 Asts: Nick Johnson 8 | Pts: Glenn Robinson III 14; Rebs: Jamari Traylor 7 Asts: Nate Wolters 5 |

Amway Center, Orlando, Florida
Referees: Dedric Taylor, Tyler Ricks, Wesley Ford

===== Fifth Place Game =====
NBA TV

July 8
8:00 am

Boxscore

Dallas Mavericks 97, Charlotte Hornets 92
Scoring by quarter: 19–27, 20–27, 30–18, 28–20
| Pts: Casey Prather 23; Rebs: Jaleel Cousins 7 Asts: Adams, Blue 6 | Pts: Ramon Galloway 25; Rebs: Quarterman, Uchebo 8 Asts: Ramon Galloway 4 |

Amway Center, Orlando, Florida
Referees: Mitchell Ervin, Nate Green, Nate Anderson

===== Third Place Game =====
NBA TV

July 8
10:00 am

Boxscore

Oklahoma City Thunder 86, Miami Heat 72
Scoring by quarter: 15–18, 23–19, 27–18, 21–17
| Pts: Semaj Christon 22; Rebs: Huestis, Johnson 7 Asts: Christon, Payne 4 | Pts: Victor Rudd 22; Rebs: Victor Rudd 12; Asts: Victor Rudd 4 |

Amway Center, Orlando, Florida
Referees: Chris Pacsi, Nelson Santiago, Lauren Holtkamp

===== Championship =====
NBA TV

July 8
12:00 pm

Boxscore

Orlando Magic White 87, Detroit Pistons 84 (OT)
Scoring by quarter: 26–26, 20–12, 17–22, 21–24, Overtime: 3–0
| Pts: Kevin Murphy 19; Rebs: Arinze Onuaku 12; Asts: Justin Dentmon 9 | Pts: Henry Ellenson 22; Rebs: Henry Ellenson 11; Asts: Cotton, Johnson 5 |

Amway Center, Orlando, Florida
Referees: Nick Buchert, Kevin Scott, Jonathan Sterling

=== Final standings ===
| # | Team | GP | W | L | PCT |
|---|---|---|---|---|---|
| 1 | Orlando Magic (White) | 5 | 5 | 0 | 1.000 |
| 2 | Detroit Pistons | 5 | 4 | 1 | .800 |
| 3 | Oklahoma City Thunder | 5 | 4 | 1 | .800 |
| 4 | Miami Heat | 5 | 3 | 2 | .600 |
| 5 | Dallas Mavericks | 5 | 2 | 3 | .400 |
| 6 | Charlotte Hornets | 5 | 2 | 3 | .400 |
| 7 | Indiana Pacers | 5 | 2 | 3 | .400 |
| 8 | Orlando Magic (Blue) | 5 | 1 | 4 | .200 |
| 9 | New York Knicks | 5 | 2 | 3 | .400 |
| 10 | Los Angeles Clippers | 5 | 0 | 5 | .000 |

=== Statistical leaders ===
Points

| Player | Team | PPG |
|---|---|---|
| Cameron Payne | Oklahoma City Thunder | 18.8 |
| Chasson Randle | New York Knicks | 18.3 |
| Vander Blue | Dallas Mavericks | 17.4 |
| Semaj Christon | Oklahoma City Thunder | 16.8 |
| Josh Richardson | Miami Heat | 16.7 |

Rebounds

| Player | Team | RPG |
|---|---|---|
| Brandon Ashley | Dallas Mavericks | 11.0 |
| Arinze Onuaku | Orlando Magic White | 9.8 |
| Tyler Honeycutt | Dallas Mavericks | 9.0 |
| Dakari Johnson | Oklahoma City Thunder | 8.6 |
| Devin Booker | New York Knicks | 8.0 |

Assists

| Player | Team | APG |
|---|---|---|
| Nick Johnson | Orlando Magic Blue | 7.4 |
| Michael Gbinije | Detroit Pistons | 5.0 |
| Chasson Randle | New York Knicks | 5.0 |
| Josh Richardson | Miami Heat | 4.7 |
| Darius Adams | Dallas Mavericks | 4.6 |

=== Honors ===
Josh Cohen of the Orlando Magic's website ranked the top five most valuable players in the Orlando Pro Summer League

1. Arinze Onuaku, Orlando Magic White (MVP)
2. Stanley Johnson, Detroit Pistons
3. Cameron Payne, Oklahoma City Thunder
4. Josh Richardson, Miami Heat
5. Glenn Robinson III, Indiana Pacers

== Utah Jazz Summer League ==
In its now second year, the Utah Jazz Summer League will host four teams. Each team will play each other in a round-robin format for a total of six games, with each team playing each day (July 4, 5, and 7).

=== Teams ===
- Utah Jazz (host)
- Boston Celtics
- Philadelphia 76ers
- San Antonio Spurs

=== Utah Schedule ===
All times are in Eastern Daylight Time (UTC−4)

==== Day 1 ====
NBA TV

July 4
7:00 pm

Boxscore

Boston Celtics 102, Philadelphia 76ers 94
Scoring by quarter: 23–20, 23–25, 29–26, 27–23
| Pts: Terry Rozier 18; Rebs: five players 6 Asts: Terry Rozier 5 | Pts: Christian Wood 20; Rebs: Ben Simmons 8 Asts: T. J. McConnell 7 |

Vivint Smart Home Arena, Salt Lake City, Utah
Attendance: 7,124
Referees: Tre Maddox, Scott Twardoski, Brett Nansel

NBA TV

July 4
9:00 pm

Boxscore

San Antonio Spurs 90, Utah Jazz 69
Scoring by quarter: 23–24, 26–16, 20–13, 21–16
| Pts: Kyle Anderson 25; Rebs: Bryn Forbes 8 Asts: Ryan Arcidiacono 4 | Pts: Trey Lyles 13; Rebs: Trey Lyles 12; Asts: Olivier Hanlan 3 |

Vivint Smart Home Arena, Salt Lake City, Utah
Attendance: 7,124
Referees: Ben Taylor, Curtis Blair, Brandon Adair

==== Day 2 ====
NBA TV

July 5
5:00 pm

Boxscore

Philadelphia 76ers 91, San Antonio Spurs 95
Scoring by quarter: 18–16, 26–31, 19–36, 28–12
| Pts: Christian Wood 19; Rebs: James Webb III 8 Asts: Gielo, Vaughn 3 | Pts: Jonathon Simmons 35; Rebs: Kyle Anderson 8 Asts: Arcidiacono, Simmons 5 |

Vivint Smart Home Arena, Salt Lake City, Utah
Attendance: 7,309
Referees: Scott Twardoski, Brandon Adair, Brett Nansel

NBA TV

July 5
7:00 pm

Boxscore

Boston Celtics 89, Utah Jazz 82
Scoring by quarter: 23–23, 24–27, 18–10, 24–22
| Pts: James Young 17; Rebs: Guerschon Yabusele 8 Asts: Terry Rozier 4 | Pts: Trey Lyles 26; Rebs: Trey Lyles 11; Asts: three players 2 |

Vivint Smart Home Arena, Salt Lake City, Utah
Attendance: 7,309
Referees: Ben Taylor, Curtis Blair, Tre Maddox

==== Day 3 ====
NBA TV

July 7
7:00 pm

Boxscore

Boston Celtics 87, San Antonio Spurs 86
Scoring by quarter: 27–18, 18–26, 23–21, 19–21
| Pts: Terry Rozier 23; Rebs: Rozier, Yabusele 7 Asts: Terry Rozier 6 | Pts: Kyle Anderson 23; Rebs: Kyle Anderson 10; Asts: Kyle Anderson 7 |

Jon M. Huntsman Center, Salt Lake City, Utah
Attendance: 6,267
Referees: Scott Twardoski, Ben Taylor, Brandon Adair

NBA TV

July 7
9:00 pm

Boxscore

Philadelphia 76ers 86, Utah Jazz 75
Scoring by quarter: 27–23, 16–20, 24–16, 19–16
| Pts: Holmes, Wood 17; Rebs: Holmes, Simmons 7 Asts: Ben Simmons 6 | Pts: Trey Lyles 22; Rebs: Trey Lyles 8 Asts: Aaron Craft 6 |

Jon M. Huntsman Center, Salt Lake City, Utah
Attendance: 6,267
Referees: Tre Maddox, Curtis Blair, Brett Nansel

=== Final results ===
| # | Team | GP | W | L | QW |
|---|---|---|---|---|---|
| 1 | Boston Celtics | 3 | 3 | 0 | 7.5 |
| 2 | San Antonio Spurs | 3 | 2 | 1 | 7 |
| 3 | Philadelphia 76ers | 3 | 1 | 2 | 6 |
| 4 | Utah Jazz | 3 | 0 | 3 | 3.5 |

=== Statistical leaders ===
Points

| Player | Team | PPG |
|---|---|---|
| Kyle Anderson | San Antonio Spurs | 23.7 |
| Jonathon Simmons | San Antonio Spurs | 22.0 |
| Dejounte Murray | San Antonio Spurs | 21.0 |
| Trey Lyles | Utah Jazz | 20.3 |
| Terry Rozier | Boston Celtics | 19.0 |

Rebounds

| Player | Team | RPG |
|---|---|---|
| Trey Lyles | Utah Jazz | 10.3 |
| Kyle Anderson | San Antonio Spurs | 8.3 |
| Ben Simmons | Philadelphia 76ers | 7.5 |
| Guerschon Yabusele | Boston Celtics | 7.0 |
| Terry Rozier | Boston Celtics | 6.3 |

Assists

| Player | Team | APG |
|---|---|---|
| Ben Simmons | Philadelphia 76ers | 5.5 |
| T. J. McConnell | Philadelphia 76ers | 5.0 |
| Terry Rozier | Boston Celtics | 5.0 |
| Kyle Anderson | San Antonio Spurs | 4.3 |
| Ryan Arcidiacono | San Antonio Spurs | 3.7 |

== Las Vegas NBA Summer League ==
Officially known as the Samsung NBA Summer League for sponsorship reasons, the Las Vegas NBA Summer League is the official summer league of the NBA. It is the premier summer league of the three, with a total of 23 teams, plus a Select Team from the NBA Development League, participating. A total of 67 games will be played from July 8 to 18, 2016, at the Thomas & Mack Center and Cox Pavilion, both located in Paradise, Nevada (near Las Vegas). Teams will compete in three preliminary games beginning on July 8 before being seeded in a tournament that leads to the Championship Game on July 18. Each team will play at least five games in Las Vegas.

=== Teams ===
- Atlanta Hawks
- Boston Celtics
- Brooklyn Nets
- Chicago Bulls
- Cleveland Cavaliers
- Dallas Mavericks
- Denver Nuggets
- Golden State Warriors
- Houston Rockets
- Los Angeles Lakers
- Memphis Grizzlies
- Miami Heat
- Milwaukee Bucks
- Minnesota Timberwolves
- NBA D-League Select
- New Orleans Pelicans
- Philadelphia 76ers
- Phoenix Suns
- Portland Trail Blazers
- Sacramento Kings
- San Antonio Spurs
- Toronto Raptors
- Utah Jazz
- Washington Wizards

=== Las Vegas Schedule ===
All times are in Eastern Daylight Time (UTC−4)

==== Day 1 ====
NBA TV

July 8
6:00 pm

Boxscore

Milwaukee Bucks 81, Cleveland Cavaliers 75
Scoring by quarter: 24–20, 24–21, 16–17, 17–17
| Pts: Terran Petteway 15; Rebs: Thon Maker 13; Asts: Julyan Stone 4 | Pts: Jordan McRae 23; Rebs: DeAndre Liggins 7 Asts: Kay Felder 5 |

Cox Pavilion, Paradise, Nevada
Referees: Marat Kogut, John Conley, Jemel Spearman

ESPN3

July 8
6:30 pm

Boxscore

NBA D-League Select 79, Memphis Grizzlies 99
Scoring by quarter: 16–26, 14–26, 19–26, 30–21
| Pts: Verdell Jones 12; Rebs: Joel Wright 6 Asts: Brandon Fields 4 | Pts: Andrew Harrison 23; Rebs: Jonathan Holmes 9 Asts: Andrew Harrison 4 |

Thomas & Mack Center, Paradise, Nevada
Referees: JT Orr, Randy Richardson, Kevin Fahy

NBA TV

July 8
8:00 pm

Boxscore

Atlanta Hawks 83, Houston Rockets 78
Scoring by quarter: 12–22, 25–22, 26–12, 20–22
| Pts: Kevin Pangos 16; Rebs: Ashley, Tavares 8 Asts: Lamar Patterson 6 | Pts: Sam Dekker 18; Rebs: Michael Beasley 9 Asts: Gary Payton II 5 |

Cox Pavilion, Paradise, Nevada
Referees: Karl Lane, John Butler, Ray Bullock

ESPN

July 8
8:30 pm

Boxscore

Minnesota Timberwolves 82, Denver Nuggets 88
Scoring by quarter: 26–15, 20–24, 24–28, 12–21
| Pts: Kris Dunn 27; Rebs: Tyus Jones 10; Asts: Tyus Jones 4 | Pts: Emmanuel Mudiay 23; Rebs: Emmanuel Mudiay 8 Asts: Fredette, Mudiay 8 |

Thomas & Mack Center, Paradise, Nevada
Referees: Vladimir Voyard-Tadal, Ray Acosta, Phenizee Ransom

NBA TV

July 8
10:00 pm

Boxscore

Sacramento Kings 47, Toronto Raptors 88
Scoring by quarter: 16–27, 7–18, 6–22, 18–21
| Pts: three players 7 Rebs: Skal Labissière 8 Asts: Willie Cauley-Stein 3 | Pts: Norman Powell 13; Rebs: Jakob Poeltl 9 Asts: Delon Wright 6 |

Cox Pavilion, Paradise, Nevada
Referees: Aaron Smith, Jason Goldenberg, Anthony Burkes

ESPN

July 8
10:30 pm

Boxscore

Los Angeles Lakers 85, New Orleans Pelicans 65
Scoring by quarter: 17–17, 27–12, 19–17, 22–19
| Pts: D'Angelo Russell 20; Rebs: D'Angelo Russell 11; Asts: D'Angelo Russell 6 | Pts: Buddy Hield 13; Rebs: Cheick Diallo 7 Asts: three players 2 |

Thomas & Mack Center, Paradise, Nevada
Referees: Gediminas Petraitis, Charles Watson, Suyash Mehta

==== Day 2 ====
NBA TV

July 9
4:00 pm

Boxscore

Phoenix Suns 86, Portland Trail Blazers 73
Scoring by quarter: 16–13, 26–22, 26–18, 18–20
| Pts: Devin Booker 28; Rebs: Alan Williams 12; Asts: Tyler Ulis 7 | Pts: Pat Connaughton 14; Rebs: Noah Vonleh 11; Asts: Pierre Jackson 4 |

Cox Pavilion, Paradise, Nevada
Referees: Eric Dalen, Jeff Wooten, Burris Anthony

ESPN3

July 9
4:30 pm

Boxscore

Cleveland Cavaliers 73, Brooklyn Nets 79
Scoring by quarter: 11–13, 22–25, 19–15, 21–26
| Pts: Jordan McRae 27; Rebs: Sir'Dominic Pointer 8 Asts: Kay Felder 4 | Pts: Sean Kilpatrick 19; Rebs: Hollis-Jefferson, McCullough 8 Asts: Ferrell, Hollis-Jefferson 4 |

Thomas & Mack Center, Paradise, Nevada
Referees: Vladimir Voyard-Tadal, Matthew Myers, John Conley

NBA TV

July 9
6:00 pm

Boxscore

Boston Celtics 62, Chicago Bulls 71
Scoring by quarter: 10–20, 28–18, 12–13, 12–20
| Pts: Terry Rozier 13; Rebs: Mickey, Yabusele 7 Asts: Terry Rozier 2 | Pts: Bobby Portis 17; Rebs: Bobby Portis 13; Asts: Dinwiddie, Miller 3 |

Cox Pavilion, Paradise, Nevada
Referees: CJ Washington, Jaston Carter, Evan Scott

ESPN3

July 9
6:30 pm

Boxscore

Washington Wizards 88, Utah Jazz 73
Scoring by quarter: 19–19, 21–16, 29–14, 19–24
| Pts: Kelly Oubre Jr. 20; Rebs: Kelly Oubre Jr. 8 Asts: D. J. Cooper 5 | Pts: Trey Lyles 28; Rebs: Mike Tobey 7 Asts: Aaron Craft 8 |

Thomas & Mack Center, Paradise, Nevada
Referees: Kevin Fahy, Don Hudson, Phenizee Ransom

NBA TV

July 9
8:00 pm

Boxscore

Denver Nuggets 106, Memphis Grizzlies 62
Scoring by quarter: 28–28, 37–10, 24–16, 17–8
| Pts: Jimmer Fredette 26; Rebs: Mateusz Ponitka 10; Asts: Jamal Murray 4 | Pts: Wade Baldwin IV 10; Rebs: four players 4 Asts: Andrew Harrison 3 |

Cox Pavilion, Paradise, Nevada
Referees: Aaron Smith, John Butler, Ray Bullock

ESPN2

July 9
8:30 pm

Boxscore

Philadelphia 76ers 69, Los Angeles Lakers 70
Scoring by quarter: 14–13, 16–12, 22–21, 17–24
| Pts: T. J. McConnell 12; Rebs: Ben Simmons 10; Asts: Ben Simmons 8 | Pts: D'Angelo Russell 22; Rebs: Nance Jr., Zubac 8 Asts: D'Angelo Russell 5 |

Thomas & Mack Center, Paradise, Nevada
Referees: Matt Kallio, William Mensah, Gediminas Petraitis

NBA TV

July 9
10:00 pm

Boxscore

Dallas Mavericks 83, Miami Heat 64
Scoring by quarter: 19–15, 17–18, 21–18, 26–13
| Pts: Jonathan Gibson 30; Rebs: Jameel Warney 7 Asts: Kyle Collinsworth 3 | Pts: Rodney McGruder 18; Rebs: Victor Rudd 6 Asts: Brianté Weber 5 |

Cox Pavilion, Paradise, Nevada
Referees: Brandon Schwab, Scott Twardoski, Ray Acosta

ESPN2

July 9
10:30 pm

Boxscore

San Antonio Spurs 63, Golden State Warriors 61
Scoring by quarter: 14–18, 13–15, 25–19, 11–9
| Pts: Kyle Anderson 14; Rebs: Dejounte Murray 10; Asts: Kyle Anderson 2 | Pts: Keifer Sykes 15; Rebs: Atkins, Laury 8 Asts: Darion Atkins 3 |

Thomas & Mack Center, Paradise, Nevada
Referees: Marat Kogut, Greg Danridge, Brandon Adair

==== Day 3 ====
NBA TV

July 10
4:00 pm

Boxscore

Atlanta Hawks 88, Washington Wizards 80
Scoring by quarter: 29–18, 20–23, 17–24, 22–15
| Pts: Bryce Cotton 21; Rebs: Bembry, Costello 6 Asts: DeAndre' Bembry 7 | Pts: Kelly Oubre Jr. 21; Rebs: Micheal Eric 8 Asts: D. J. Cooper 3 |

Cox Pavilion, Paradise, Nevada
Referees: Ben Taylor, Kevin Fahy, Jamel Spearman

ESPN3

July 10
4:30 pm

Boxscore

Milwaukee Bucks 86, NBA D-League Select 91
Scoring by quarter: 21–19, 28–26, 19–22, 18–24
| Pts: Rashad Vaughn 24; Rebs: Thon Maker 17; Asts: Brogdon, Vaughn 4 | Pts: Jabril Trawick 15; Rebs: Patrick Christopher 6 Asts: Jaron Johnson 5 |

Thomas & Mack Center, Paradise, Nevada
Referees: Evan Scott, Karl Lane, Brandon Adair

NBA TV

July 10
6:00 pm

Boxscore

Minnesota Timberwolves 80, Toronto Raptors 82
Scoring by quarter: 13–19, 22–14, 30–24, 15–25
| Pts: Kris Dunn 21; Rebs: Kris Dunn 9 Asts: Dunn, Jones 4 | Pts: Norman Powell 29; Rebs: Norman Powell 8 Asts: Powell, Wright 3 |

Cox Pavilion, Paradise, Nevada
Referees: Nick Meyer, Scott Twardoski, Jason Goldenberg

ESPN3

July 10
6:30 pm

Boxscore

Houston Rockets 85, Sacramento Kings 73
Scoring by quarter: 23–18, 15–23, 21–15, 26–17
| Pts: Sam Dekker 19; Rebs: Chinanu Onuaku 9 Asts: Isaiah Taylor 5 | Pts: Malachi Richardson 20; Rebs: Malachi Richardson 7 Asts: David Stockton 5 |

Thomas & Mack Center, Paradise, Nevada
Referees: Evan Scott, Justin VanDuyne, JB DeRosa

NBA TV

July 10
8:00 pm

Boxscore

Utah Jazz 79, New Orleans Pelicans 72
Scoring by quarter: 16–14, 21–18, 22–20, 20–20
| Pts: Tyrone Wallace 15; Rebs: Joel Bolomboy 11; Asts: Ford, Paige 3 | Pts: Buddy Hield 21; Rebs: Cheick Diallo 11; Asts: Larry Drew II 6 |

Cox Pavilion, Paradise, Nevada
Referees: CJ Washington, Phenizee Ransom, Charles Rubia″

ESPN2

July 10
8:30 pm

Boxscore

Chicago Bulls 83, Philadelphia 76ers 70
Scoring by quarter: 13–12, 18–19, 27–18, 25–21
| Pts: Cristiano Felício 17; Rebs: Cristiano Felício 10; Asts: Dinwiddie, Felício 4 | Pts: Ben Simmons 18; Rebs: McConnell, Wood 6 Asts: T. J. McConnell 4 |

Thomas & Mack Center, Paradise, Nevada
Referees: Eric Dalen, Randy Richardson, Isaac Barnett

NBA TV

July 10
10:00 pm

Boxscore

San Antonio Spurs 85, Portland Trail Blazers 69
Scoring by quarter: 18–9, 30–24, 13–17, 24–19
| Pts: Kyle Anderson 23; Rebs: Cady Lalanne 9 Asts: five players 2 | Pts: Noah Vonleh 16; Rebs: Noah Vonleh 12; Asts: Russ Smith 4 |

Cox Pavilion, Paradise, Nevada
Referees: Suyash Mehta, JT Orr, Jaston Carter

ESPN2

July 10
10:30 pm

Boxscore

Phoenix Suns 87, Boston Celtics 74
Scoring by quarter: 24–16, 20–24, 21–10, 22–24
| Pts: Devin Booker 24; Rebs: Marquese Chriss 14; Asts: Devin Booker 7 | Pts: Jordan Mickey 18; Rebs: Mickey, Nader 6 Asts: Brown, Walden 3 |

Thomas & Mack Center, Paradise, Nevada
Referees: Jacyn Goble, Steven Perry, Haywoode Workman

==== Day 4 ====
ESPN3

July 11
4:00 pm

Boxscore

Milwaukee Bucks 81, Memphis Grizzlies 85
Scoring by quarter: 18–14, 20–24, 25–27, 18–20
| Pts: Terran Petteway 21; Rebs: Maker, Petteway 6 Asts: Malcolm Brogdon 5 | Pts: D. J. Stephens 21; Rebs: Jonathan Holmes 9 Asts: Andrew Harrison 6 |

Cox Pavilion, Paradise, Nevada
Referees: Jemel Spearman, Jacyn Goble, Justin VanDuyne

NBA TV

July 11
4:30 pm

Boxscore

Brooklyn Nets 72, Atlanta Hawks 65
Scoring by quarter: 18–14, 27–15, 13–21, 14–15
| Pts: Chris McCullough 16; Rebs: Chris McCullough 8 Asts: Rondae Hollis-Jefferson 4 | Pts: Brandon Ashley 11; Rebs: Edy Tavares 8 Asts: DeAndre' Bembry 3 |

Thomas & Mack Center, Paradise, Nevada
Referees: JT Orr, Ray Acosta, John Butler

ESPN3

July 11
6:00 pm

Boxscore

Houston Rockets 71, NBA D-League Select 89
Scoring by quarter: 26–23, 15–20, 15–28, 15–18
| Pts: Montrezl Harrell 18; Rebs: Montrezl Harrell 8 Asts: Sam Dekker 6 | Pts: Joel Wright 19; Rebs: Jaron Johnson 8 Asts: Fields, Holloway 3 |

Cox Pavilion, Paradise, Nevada
Referees: Marat Kogut, Jason Goldenberg, Mousa Dagher

NBA TV

July 11
6:30 pm

Boxscore

Toronto Raptors 80, Dallas Mavericks 69
Scoring by quarter: 20–15, 16–6, 18–28, 26–20
| Pts: Norman Powell 23; Rebs: Jakob Poeltl 7 Asts: Delon Wright 5 | Pts: Jameel Warney 14; Rebs: Jameel Warney 8 Asts: three players 3 |

Thomas & Mack Center, Paradise, Nevada
Referees: Gediminas Petraitis, John Conley, Suyash Mehta

ESPN2

July 11
8:00 pm

Boxscore

Miami Heat 92, Denver Nuggets 81
Scoring by quarter: 19–19, 20–25, 27–21, 26–16
| Pts: Rodney McGruder 23; Rebs: Okaro White 8 Asts: Brianté Weber 7 | Pts: Jamal Murray 29; Rebs: Juan Hernangómez 12; Asts: Juan Hernangómez 5 |

Cox Pavilion, Paradise, Nevada
Referees: Brent Barnaky, JB DeRosa, Kevin Fahy

NBA TV

July 11
8:30 pm

Boxscore

Cleveland Cavaliers 99, Minnesota Timberwolves 68
Scoring by quarter: 20–14, 24–20, 29–9, 26–25
| Pts: Raphiael Putney 19; Rebs: Cory Jefferson 8 Asts: DeAndre Liggins 5 | Pts: Tyus Jones 15; Rebs: Devin Thomas 8 Asts: Jones, Silas 3 |

Thomas & Mack Center, Paradise, Nevada
Referees: Nick Buchert, Vladimir Voyard-Tadal, William Mensah

ESPN2

July 11
10:00 pm

Boxscore

Sacramento Kings 66, New Orleans Pelicans 70
Scoring by quarter: 20–13, 14–14, 11–27, 21–16
| Pts: Skal Labissière 16; Rebs: Willie Cauley-Stein 8 Asts: David Stockton 4 | Pts: Buddy Hield 23; Rebs: Diallo, Hield 7 Asts: Drew II, Hield 5 |

Cox Pavilion, Paradise, Nevada
Referees: Karl Lane, Bharat Ramnanan, Randy Richardson

NBA TV

July 11
10:30 pm

Boxscore

Golden State Warriors 65, Los Angeles Lakers 78
Scoring by quarter: 11–17, 16–26, 20–17, 18–18
| Pts: Keifer Sykes 16; Rebs: Robert Carter 7 Asts: Keifer Sykes 3 | Pts: D'Angelo Russell 26; Rebs: Jarvis Varnado 10; Asts: Xavier Munford 4 |

Thomas & Mack Center, Paradise, Nevada
Referees: Steve Anderson, Tyler Ford, Chance Moore

==== Day 5 ====
ESPN3

July 12
4:00 pm

Boxscore

Washington Wizards 87, Brooklyn Nets 85
Scoring by quarter: 21–20, 18–24, 21–22, 27–19
| Pts: Eddie, Oubre Jr. 16; Rebs: three players 6 Asts: Sterling Gibbs 5 | Pts: Rondae Hollis-Jefferson 19; Rebs: Jerrelle Benimon 9 Asts: Josh Magette 5 |

Cox Pavilion, Paradise, Nevada
Referees: Ben Taylor, Aaron Smith, Amit Balak

NBA TV

July 12
4:30 pm

Boxscore

Portland Trail Blazers 92, Utah Jazz 89 (2OT)
Scoring by quarter: 19–11, 19–24, 22–23, 22–24, Overtime: 7–7, 3–0
| Pts: C. J. Fair 20; Rebs: Noah Vonleh 10; Asts: Pierre Jackson 5 | Pts: Trey Lyles 30; Rebs: Quincy Ford 12; Asts: Aaron Craft 6 |

Thomas & Mack Center, Paradise, Nevada
Referees: Haywoode Workman, Phenizee Ransom, Harja Jaladri

ESPN2

July 12
6:00 pm

Boxscore

Boston Celtics 88, Dallas Mavericks 82
Scoring by quarter: 19–14, 18–22, 26–17, 25–29
| Pts: Terry Rozier 26; Rebs: Jaylen Brown 10; Asts: R. J. Hunter 4 | Pts: Justin Anderson 29; Rebs: Justin Anderson 11; Asts: Kyle Collinsworth 4 |

Cox Pavilion, Paradise, Nevada
Referees: Jacob Barnett, Marat Kogut, CJ Washington

NBA TV

July 12
6:30 pm

Boxscore

Miami Heat 80, Phoenix Suns 71
Scoring by quarter: 15–16, 23–17, 24–13, 18–25
| Pts: Michael Carrera 16; Rebs: Okaro White 12; Asts: Brianté Weber 6 | Pts: Alan Williams 18; Rebs: Alan Williams 10; Asts: Tyler Ulis 7 |

Thomas & Mack Center, Paradise, Nevada
Referees: Wesley Ford, Steve Anderson, Ray Acosta

ESPN

July 12
8:00 pm

Boxscore

San Antonio Spurs 76, Chicago Bulls 79
Scoring by quarter: 20–14, 21–25, 18–21, 17–19
| Pts: Jonathon Simmons 22; Rebs: Jarnell Stokes 7 Asts: Jonathon Simmons 3 | Pts: Bobby Portis 18; Rebs: Bobby Portis 8 Asts: Denzel Valentine 3 |

Cox Pavilion, Paradise, Nevada
Referees: Nick Buchert, Jaston Carter, Bharat Ramnanan

NBA TV

July 12
8:30 pm

Boxscore

Philadelphia 76ers 77, Golden State Warriors 85
Scoring by quarter: 20–22, 18–17, 19–26, 20–20
| Pts: Christian Wood 22; Rebs: Holmes, Simmons 8 Asts: Ben Simmons 6 | Pts: O'Neale, Sykes 16; Rebs: Ognjen Kuzmić 11; Asts: Thomas Walkup 4 |

Thomas & Mack Center, Paradise, Nevada
Referees: Brent Barnaky, Brandon Adair, Matt Kallio

=== Championship ===
The championship is determined by a single-elimination tournament; the top 8 teams receive a first-round bye.

Seeding criteria

Teams are seeded first by overall record, then by a tiebreaker system

1. Head-to-head result (applicable only to ties between two teams, not to multiple-team ties)
2. Quarter point system (1 point for win, .5 for tie, 0 for loss, 0 for overtime periods)
3. Point differential
4. Coin flip

First-round losers will play consolation games to determine 17th through 24th places based on the tiebreaker system stated above. Second-round losers will play consolation games to determine ninth through 16th places.

==== Standings/seedings ====
| # | Team | GP | W | L | PCT | QP | PD |
|---|---|---|---|---|---|---|---|
| 1 | Toronto Raptors | 3 | 3 | 0 | 1.000 | 9 | +54 |
| 2 | Chicago Bulls | 3 | 3 | 0 | 1.000 | 9 | +25 |
| 3 | Los Angeles Lakers | 3 | 3 | 0 | 1.000 | 7 | |
| 4 | Denver Nuggets | 3 | 2 | 1 | .667 | 8 | |
| 5 | Phoenix Suns | 3 | 2 | 1 | .667 | 7 | +17 |
| 6 | Brooklyn Nets | 3 | 2 | 1 | .667 | 7 | +11 |
| 7 | Washington Wizards | 3 | 2 | 1 | .667 | 6.5 | +9 |
| 8 | Memphis Grizzlies | 3 | 2 | 1 | .667 | 6.5 | -20 |
| 9 | San Antonio Spurs | 3 | 2 | 1 | .667 | 6 | +15 |
| 10 | Atlanta Hawks | 3 | 2 | 1 | .667 | 6 | +6 |
| 11 | NBA D-League Select | 3 | 2 | 1 | .667 | 6 | +3 |
| 12 | Miami Heat | 3 | 2 | 1 | .667 | 5.5 | |
| 13 | Utah Jazz | 3 | 1 | 2 | .333 | 8 | |
| 14 | Cleveland Cavaliers | 3 | 1 | 2 | .333 | 6.5 | |
| 15 | Dallas Mavericks | 3 | 1 | 2 | .333 | 6 | +2 |
| 16 | Golden State Warriors | 3 | 1 | 2 | .333 | 6 | -7 |
| 17 | Houston Rockets | 3 | 1 | 2 | .333 | 6 | -11 |
| 18 | Milwaukee Bucks | 3 | 1 | 2 | .333 | 5.5 | |
| 19 | Boston Celtics | 3 | 1 | 2 | .333 | 5 | |
| 20 | Portland Trail Blazers | 3 | 1 | 2 | .333 | 3 | |
| 21 | New Orleans Pelicans | 3 | 1 | 2 | .333 | 2.5 | |
| 22 | Philadelphia 76ers | 3 | 0 | 3 | .000 | 5.5 | |
| 23 | Sacramento Kings | 3 | 0 | 3 | .000 | 3.5 | |
| 24 | Minnesota Timberwolves | 3 | 0 | 3 | .000 | 3 | |

==== Bracket ====
First Round (July 13)
16 | Golden State Warriors | 80
17 | Houston Rockets | 76
9 | San Antonio Spurs | 71
24 | Minnesota Timberwolves | 80
12 | Miami Heat | 81
21 | New Orleans Pelicans | 77
13 | Utah Jazz | 86
20 | Portland Trail Blazers | 71
14 | Cleveland Cavaliers | 98
19 | Boston Celtics | 94
11 | NBA D-League Select | 71
22 | Philadelphia 76ers | 108
10 | Atlanta Hawks | 81
23 | Sacramento Kings | 61
15 | Dallas Mavericks | 81
18 | Milwaukee Bucks | 64

Second Round (July 14)
1 | Toronto Raptors | 75
16 | Golden State Warriors | 69
24 | Minnesota Timberwolves | 89
8 | Memphis Grizzlies | 85
5 | Phoenix Suns | 77
12 | Miami Heat | 74
13 | Utah Jazz | 60
4 | Denver Nuggets | 80
3 | Los Angeles Lakers | 80
14 | Cleveland Cavaliers | 88
22 | Philadelphia 76ers | 84
6 | Brooklyn Nets | 87
7 | Washington Wizards | 71
10 | Atlanta Hawks | 60
15 | Dallas Mavericks | 73
2 | Chicago Bulls | 86

Quarterfinals (July 16)
1 | Toronto Raptors | 79
24 | Minnesota Timberwolves | 81
5 | Phoenix Suns | 82*
4 | Denver Nuggets | 81
14 | Cleveland Cavaliers | 91*
6 | Brooklyn Nets | 83
7 | Washington Wizards | 85
2 | Chicago Bulls | 88

Semifinals (July 17)
24 | Minnesota Timberwolves | 93
5 | Phoenix Suns | 83
14 | Cleveland Cavaliers | 79
2 | Chicago Bulls | 85

Final (July 18)
24 | Minnesota Timberwolves | 82
2 | Chicago Bulls | 84*

==== Tournament schedule ====
All times are in Eastern Daylight Time (UTC−4)

===== First round =====
ESPN3

July 13
4:00 pm

Boxscore

#23 Sacramento Kings 61, #10 Atlanta Hawks 81
Scoring by quarter: 18–22, 19–20, 16–22, 8–17
| Pts: Retin Obasohan 12; Rebs: Labissière, Papagiannis 5 Asts: Isaiah Cousins 6 | Pts: Taurean Prince 21; Rebs: Prince, Tavares 9 Asts: Kevin Pangos 7 |

Cox Pavilion, Paradise, Nevada
Referees: Jemel Spearman, William Mensah, Ben Taylor

NBA TV

July 13
4:30 pm

Boxscore

#21 New Orleans Pelicans 77, #12 Miami Heat 81
Scoring by quarter: 19–20, 17–23, 25–14, 16–24
| Pts: Buddy Hield 16; Rebs: Cheick Diallo 12; Asts: Buddy Hield 5 | Pts: Brianté Weber 18; Rebs: Stefan Janković 6 Asts: six players 2 |

Thomas & Mack Center, Paradise, Nevada
Referees: Brandon Schwab, Tyler Ford, Jacyn Goble

ESPN3

July 13
6:00 pm

Boxscore

#24 Minnesota Timberwolves 80, #9 San Antonio Spurs 71
Scoring by quarter: 28–19, 19–17, 24–21, 9–14
| Pts: Adreian Payne 20; Rebs: Adreian Payne 7 Asts: Tyus Jones 9 | Pts: Jonathon Simmons 19; Rebs: Jarnell Stokes 8 Asts: Ryan Arcidiacono 2 |

Cox Pavilion, Paradise, Nevada
Referees: Tre Maddox, Jaston Carter, Brandon Adair

NBA TV

July 13
6:30 pm

Boxscore

#22 Philadelphia 76ers 108, #11 NBA D-League Select 71
Scoring by quarter: 27–16, 29–26, 25–14, 27–15
| Pts: Shawn Long 21; Rebs: Paul, Webb III 6 Asts: T. J. McConnell 9 | Pts: Brandon Fields 15; Rebs: Jabril Trawick 7 Asts: Jaron Johnson 2 |

Thomas & Mack Center, Paradise, Nevada
Referees: JT Orr, Brett Nansel, Isaac Barnett

ESPN2

July 13
8:00 pm

Boxscore

#19 Boston Celtics 94, #14 Cleveland Cavaliers 98
Scoring by quarter: 23–20, 20–25, 22–27, 29–26
| Pts: Jaylen Brown 25; Rebs: Jaylen Brown 9 Asts: Rozier, Yabusele 2 | Pts: Jordan McRae 32; Rebs: Sir'Dominic Pointer 6 Asts: Felder, Stockton 3 |

Cox Pavilion, Paradise, Nevada
Referees: JB DeRosa, John Butler, Charles Rubia

NBA TV

July 13
8:30 pm

Boxscore

#20 Portland Trail Blazers 71, #13 Utah Jazz 86
Scoring by quarter: 18–18, 19–28, 14–19, 20–21
| Pts: Pierre Jackson 18; Rebs: Bachynski, Jackson 6 Asts: three players 3 | Pts: Tibor Pleiss 20; Rebs: Joel Bolomboy 9 Asts: Joel Bolomboy 3 |

Thomas & Mack Center, Paradise, Nevada
Referees: Sir Allen Conner, Jason Goldenberg, Gediminas Petraitis

ESPN2

July 13
10:00 pm

Boxscore

#18 Milwaukee Bucks 64, #15 Dallas Mavericks 81
Scoring by quarter: 17–17, 18–19, 8–24, 21–21
| Pts: Thon Maker 17; Rebs: Joshua Smith 7 Asts: Malcolm Brogdon 5 | Pts: Jonathan Gibson 14; Rebs: Jameel Warney 12; Asts: three players 3 |

Cox Pavilion, Paradise, Nevada
Referees: Karl Lane, Aaron Smith, Matthew Myers

NBA TV

July 13
10:30 pm

Boxscore

#17 Houston Rockets 76, #16 Golden State Warriors 80
Scoring by quarter: 18–21, 16–23, 24–20, 18–16
| Pts: K. J. McDaniels 25; Rebs: K. J. McDaniels 9 Asts: Freeman, Taylor 5 | Pts: Keifer Sykes 17; Rebs: Ognjen Kuzmić 10; Asts: Ognjen Kuzmić 4 |

Thomas & Mack Center, Paradise, Nevada
Referees: Vladimir Voyard-Tadal, Randy Richardson, Charles Watson

===== Second round =====
NBA TV

July 14
4:00 pm

Boxscore

#10 Atlanta Hawks 60, #7 Washington Wizards 71
Scoring by quarter: 14–15, 23–10, 11–20, 12–26
| Pts: Brandon Ashley 12; Rebs: Prince, Tavares 7 Asts: DeAndre' Bembry 4 | Pts: Kelly Oubre Jr. 22; Rebs: three players 6 Asts: Nate Wolters 3 |

Cox Pavilion, Paradise, Nevada
Referees: Marat Kogut, Matthew Myers, Jemel Spearman

ESPN2

July 14
4:30 pm

Boxscore

#24 Minnesota Timberwolves 89, #8 Memphis Grizzlies 85
Scoring by quarter: 22–19, 20–18, 17–19, 30–29
| Pts: Tyus Jones 26; Rebs: Devin Thomas 10; Asts: Tyus Jones 10 | Pts: Levi Randolph 26; Rebs: Vince Hunter 10; Asts: Wade Baldwin IV 3 |

Thomas & Mack Center, Paradise, Nevada
Referees: JT Orr, Phenizee Ransom, Nick Meyer

NBA TV

July 14
6:00 pm

Boxscore

#12 Miami Heat 74, #5 Phoenix Suns 77
Scoring by quarter: 23–23, 14–23, 16–14, 21–17
| Pts: Victor Rudd 24; Rebs: Brianté Weber 7 Asts: Brianté Weber 3 | Pts: Tyler Ulis 20; Rebs: Alan Williams 11; Asts: Tyler Ulis 8 |

Cox Pavilion, Paradise, Nevada
Referees: Haywoode Workman, Isaac Barnett, Evan Scott

ESPNU

July 14
6:30 pm

Boxscore

#22 Philadelphia 76ers 84, #6 Brooklyn Nets 87
Scoring by quarter: 20–22, 24–19, 24–23, 16–23
| Pts: Brandon Paul 18; Rebs: Richaun Holmes 8 Asts: T. J. McConnell 8 | Pts: Sean Kilpatrick 24; Rebs: Chris McCullough 10; Asts: Isaiah Whitehead 5 |

Thomas & Mack Center, Paradise, Nevada
Referees: Steve Anderson, John Conley, Nick Heater

NBA TV

July 14
8:00 pm

Boxscore

#13 Utah Jazz 60, #4 Denver Nuggets 80
Scoring by quarter: 21–23, 12–14, 12–27, 15–16
| Pts: three players 10; Rebs: Joel Bolomboy 8 Asts: Tyrone Wallace 4 | Pts: Jamal Murray 20; Rebs: Cornelie, Sampson 6 Asts: Jimmer Fredette 4 |

Cox Pavilion, Paradise, Nevada
Referees: CJ Washington, Jacyn Goble, Suyash Mehta

ESPN2

July 14
8:30 pm

Boxscore

#15 Dallas Mavericks 73, #2 Chicago Bulls 86
Scoring by quarter: 15–19, 14–19, 23–25, 21–23
| Pts: Justin Anderson 17; Rebs: three players 5 Asts: three players 3 | Pts: Bobby Portis 19; Rebs: Felício, Portis 8 Asts: Jerian Grant 6 |

Thomas & Mack Center, Paradise, Nevada
Referees: Steven Perry, Justin VanDuyne, Andy Nagy

NBA TV

July 14
10:00 pm

Boxscore

#16 Golden State Warriors 69, #1 Toronto Raptors 75
Scoring by quarter: 15–21, 20–18, 15–15, 19–21
| Pts: Patrick McCaw 28; Rebs: Royce O'Neale 14; Asts: O'Neale, Sykes 5 | Pts: Norman Powell 17; Rebs: Jakob Poeltl 7 Asts: Delon Wright 4 |

Cox Pavilion, Paradise, Nevada
Referees: Vladimir Voyard-Tadal, Bharat Ram, Chance Moore

ESPN2

July 14
10:30 pm

Boxscore

#14 Cleveland Cavaliers 88, #3 Los Angeles Lakers 80
Scoring by quarter: 21–21, 15–31, 29–15, 23–13
| Pts: Jordan McRae 36; Rebs: DeAndre Liggins 11; Asts: Kay Felder 3 | Pts: D'Angelo Russell 19; Rebs: Larry Nance Jr. 10; Asts: D'Angelo Russell 4 |

Thomas & Mack Center, Paradise, Nevada
Referees: JB DeRosa, Sir Allen Conner, Matt Kallio

===== Consolation Round =====
ESPN3

July 15
4:00 pm

Boxscore

#23 Sacramento Kings 86, #9 San Antonio Spurs 90 (OT)
Scoring by quarter: 19–15, 23–20, 24–21, 18–28, Overtime: 2–6
| Pts: Skal Labissière 19; Rebs: three players 5 Asts: Duje Dukan 4 | Pts: Dejounte Murray 20; Rebs: Landry Nnoko 6 Asts: Dejounte Murray 9 |

Cox Pavilion, Paradise, Nevada
Referees: Haywoode Workman, Aaron Smith, Charles Rubia

NBA TV

July 15
4:30 pm

Boxscore

#21 New Orleans Pelicans 76, #11 NBA D-League Select 88
Scoring by quarter: 25–15, 21–21, 17–31, 13–21
| Pts: Jameel McKay 16; Rebs: Jameel McKay 13; Asts: Ryan Boatright 9 | Pts: Quinn Cook 19; Rebs: Joel Wright 8 Asts: Quinn Cook 6 |

Thomas & Mack Center, Paradise, Nevada
Referees: Chance Moore, Karl Lane, Jason Goldenberg

ESPN3

July 15
6:00 pm

Boxscore

#20 Portland Trail Blazers 80, #19 Boston Celtics 75
Scoring by quarter: 17–17, 27–18, 16–23, 20–17
| Pts: Pat Connaughton 23; Rebs: Jake Layman 7 Asts: Pierre Jackson 8 | Pts: Jaylen Brown 21; Rebs: Jordan Mickey 13; Asts: Jackson, Walden 3 |

Cox Pavilion, Paradise, Nevada
Referees: CJ Washington, Jaston Carter, Kevin Fahy

NBA TV

July 15
6:30 pm

Boxscore

#18 Milwaukee Bucks 89, #17 Houston Rockets 92
Scoring by quarter: 20–23, 24–15, 22–26, 23–28
| Pts: Ra'Shad James 19; Rebs: Thon Maker 9 Asts: Malcolm Brogdon 5 | Pts: Montrezl Harrell 20; Rebs: Dekker, Harrell 8 Asts: Isaiah Taylor 7 |

Thomas & Mack Center, Paradise, Nevada
Referees: Matt Kallio, Bharat Ramnanan, Gediminas Petraitis

ESPN2

July 15
8:00 pm

Boxscore

#10 Atlanta Hawks 89, #8 Memphis Grizzlies 79
Scoring by quarter: 23–14, 14–19, 24–21, 28–25
| Pts: Bryce Cotton 18; Rebs: Edy Tavares 10; Asts: Darington Hobson 6 | Pts: Vince Hunter 18; Rebs: Vince Hunter 8 Asts: Andrew Harrison 5 |

Cox Pavilion, Paradise, Nevada
Referees: Nick Meyer, Tyler Ford, John Butler

NBA TV

July 15
8:30 pm

Boxscore

#22 Philadelphia 76ers 74, #12 Miami Heat 66
Scoring by quarter: 21–20, 22–17, 20–16, 11–13
| Pts: Shawn Long 18; Rebs: Long, Simmons 10; Asts: Ben Simmons 6 | Pts: Damion Lee 17; Rebs: Michael Carrera 10; Asts: Nic Moore 6 |

Thomas & Mack Center, Paradise, Nevada
Referees: Ray Acosta, Steven Perry, Andy Nagy

ESPN2

July 15
10:00 pm

Boxscore

#16 Golden State Warriors 74, #15 Dallas Mavericks 80
Scoring by quarter: 14–20, 15–23, 20–18, 25–19
| Pts: Winston Shepard 17; Rebs: Winston Shepard 6 Asts: David Laury 4 | Pts: Chane Behanan 14; Rebs: Jameel Warney 10; Asts: Collinsworth, Finney-Smith 3 |

Cox Pavilion, Paradise, Nevada
Referees: Brett Nansel, John Conley, Suyash Mehta

NBA TV

July 15
10:30 pm

Boxscore

#13 Utah Jazz 92, #3 Los Angeles Lakers 88
Scoring by quarter: 19–20, 20–24, 28–19, 25–25
| Pts: Joel Bolomboy 20; Rebs: Bolomboy, Pleiss 7 Asts: Dionte Christmas 4 | Pts: Brandon Ingram 22; Rebs: Ivica Zubac 11; Asts: Ingram, Munford 4 |

Thomas & Mack Center, Paradise, Nevada
Referees: Steve Anderson, Randy Richardson, Nick Heater

===== Quarterfinals =====
ESPNU

July 16
4:00 pm

Boxscore

#24 Minnesota Timberwolves 81, #1 Toronto Raptors 79
Scoring by quarter: 20–15, 14–27, 23–23, 24–14
| Pts: Xavier Silas 22; Rebs: Adreian Payne 10; Asts: Tyus Jones 8 | Pts: Norman Powell 17; Rebs: Delon Wright 8 Asts: VanVleet, Wright 3 |

Thomas & Mack Center, Paradise, Nevada
Referees: Gediminas Petraitis, JB DeRosa, Phenizee Ransom

ESPN2

July 16
6:00 pm

Boxscore

#5 Phoenix Suns 82, #4 Denver Nuggets 81 (OT)
Scoring by quarter: 15–22, 19–15, 27–25, 18–17, Overtime: 3–2
| Pts: Troy Williams 22; Rebs: Alan Williams 16; Asts: Tyler Ulis 4 | Pts: Jamal Murray 29; Rebs: Juan Hernangómez 12; Asts: Juan Hernangómez 4 |

Thomas & Mack Center, Paradise, Nevada
Referees: Karl Lane, Jaston Carter, Brandon Adair

ESPN2

July 16
8:00 pm

Boxscore

#7 Washington Wizards 85, #2 Chicago Bulls 88
Scoring by quarter: 23–25, 15–18, 24–28, 23–17
| Pts: Jarell Eddie 22; Rebs: Aaron White 8 Asts: Nate Wolters 7 | Pts: Bobby Portis 17; Rebs: Denzel Valentine 10; Asts: Jerian Grant 8 |

Thomas & Mack Center, Paradise, Nevada
Referees: Vladimir Voyard-Tadal, Jacyn Goble, Jason Goldenberg

ESPN2

July 16
10:00 pm

Boxscore

#14 Cleveland Cavaliers 91, #6 Brooklyn Nets 83 (OT)
Scoring by quarter: 29–20, 12–21, 18–20, 24–22, Overtime: 8–0
| Pts: Jordan McRae 25; Rebs: Kenny Gabriel 11; Asts: Kay Felder 4 | Pts: Sean Kilpatrick 25; Rebs: Chris McCullough 10; Asts: Isaiah Whitehead 4 |

Thomas & Mack Center, Paradise, Nevada
Referees: Justin VanDuyne, Ray Acosta, John Butler

===== Semifinals =====
ESPN2

July 17
6:00 pm

Boxscore

#24 Minnesota Timberwolves 93, #5 Phoenix Suns 83
Scoring by quarter: 19–23, 24–25, 24–18, 26–17
| Pts: Tyus Jones 29; Rebs: Adreian Payne 10; Asts: Toure' Murry 7 | Pts: Troy Williams 24; Rebs: A. Williams, T. Williams 6 Asts: Tyler Ulis 7 |

Thomas & Mack Center, Paradise, Nevada
Referees: Douglas Christie, CJ Washington, JB DeRosa

ESPN2

July 17
8:00 pm

Boxscore

#14 Cleveland Cavaliers 79, #2 Chicago Bulls 85
Scoring by quarter: 29–25, 17–11, 13–21, 20–28
| Pts: Kay Felder 22; Rebs: McRae, Putney 6 Asts: Kay Felder 5 | Pts: Cristiano Felício 18; Rebs: Bobby Portis 9 Asts: three players 3 |

Thomas & Mack Center, Paradise, Nevada
Referees: Tre Maddox, Brett Nansel, Aaron Smith

===== Final =====
ESPN

July 18
9:00 pm

Boxscore

#24 Minnesota Timberwolves 82, #2 Chicago Bulls 84 (OT)
Scoring by quarter: 13–18, 29–14, 16–27, 19–18, Overtime: 5–7
| Pts: Tyus Jones 27; Rebs: Adreian Payne 16; Asts: Tyus Jones 10 | Pts: Bobby Portis 26; Rebs: Grant, Portis 10; Asts: Jerian Grant 5 |

Thomas & Mack Center, Paradise, Nevada
Referees: Tre Maddox, Justin VanDuyne, Tyler Ford

=== Final standings ===
| # | Team | GP | W | L | PCT | QP | Explanation |
|---|---|---|---|---|---|---|---|
| 1 | Chicago Bulls | 7 | 7 | 0 | 1.000 | 20 | Won Championship Game |
| 2 | Minnesota Timberwolves | 8 | 4 | 4 | .500 | 15.5 | Lost Championship Game |
| 3 | Phoenix Suns | 6 | 4 | 2 | .667 | 13.5 | Lost in Semifinals |
| 4 | Cleveland Cavaliers | 7 | 4 | 3 | .571 | 15 | Lost in Semifinals |
| 5 | Toronto Raptors | 5 | 4 | 1 | .800 | 13 | Lost in Quarterfinals |
| 6 | Denver Nuggets | 5 | 3 | 2 | .600 | 13 | Lost in Quarterfinals |
| 7 | Brooklyn Nets | 5 | 3 | 2 | .600 | 11 | Lost in Quarterfinals |
| 8 | Washington Wizards | 5 | 3 | 2 | .600 | 10.5 | Lost in Quarterfinals |
| 9 | Atlanta Hawks | 6 | 4 | 2 | .667 | 14 | Lost in Second Round |
| 10 | Los Angeles Lakers | 5 | 3 | 2 | .600 | 11 | Lost in Second Round |
| 11 | Utah Jazz | 6 | 3 | 3 | .500 | 13 | Lost in Second Round |
| 12 | Miami Heat | 6 | 3 | 3 | .500 | 12 | Lost in Second Round |
| 13 | Dallas Mavericks | 6 | 3 | 3 | .500 | 11 | Lost in Second Round |
| 14 | Memphis Grizzlies | 5 | 2 | 3 | .400 | 8.5 | Lost in Second Round |
| 15 | Philadelphia 76ers | 6 | 2 | 4 | .333 | 14.5 | Lost in Second Round |
| 16 | Golden State Warriors | 6 | 2 | 4 | .333 | 11.5 | Lost in Second Round |
| 17 | NBA D-League Select | 5 | 3 | 2 | .600 | 8.5 | Lost in First Round |
| 18 | San Antonio Spurs | 5 | 3 | 2 | .600 | 8 | Lost in First Round |
| 19 | Houston Rockets | 5 | 2 | 3 | .400 | 11 | Lost in First Round |
| 20 | Portland Trail Blazers | 5 | 2 | 3 | .400 | 6 | Lost in First Round |
| 21 | Boston Celtics | 5 | 1 | 4 | .200 | 8.5 | Lost in First Round |
| 22 | Milwaukee Bucks | 5 | 1 | 4 | .200 | 7.5 | Lost in First Round |
| 23 | New Orleans Pelicans | 5 | 1 | 4 | .200 | 5 | Lost in First Round |
| 24 | Sacramento Kings | 5 | 0 | 5 | .000 | 6.5 | Lost in First Round |

=== Statistical leaders ===
Points

| Player | Team | PPG |
|---|---|---|
| Trey Lyles | Utah Jazz | 29.0 |
| Devin Booker | Phoenix Suns | 26.0 |
| Jordan McRae | Cleveland Cavaliers | 24.3 |
| Kris Dunn | Minnesota Timberwolves | 24.0 |
| Emmanuel Mudiay | Denver Nuggets | 23.0 |

Rebounds

| Player | Team | RPG |
|---|---|---|
| Alan Williams | Phoenix Suns | 11.2 |
| Thon Maker | Milwaukee Bucks | 9.6 |
| Cheick Diallo | New Orleans Pelicans | 9.4 |
| Bobby Portis | Chicago Bulls | 9.4 |
| Michael Beasley | Houston Rockets | 9.0 |

Assists

| Player | Team | APG |
|---|---|---|
| Tyus Jones | Minnesota Timberwolves | 6.8 |
| Devin Booker | Phoenix Suns | 6.5 |
| Tyler Ulis | Phoenix Suns | 6.3 |
| Emmanuel Mudiay | Denver Nuggets | 6.0 |
| T. J. McConnell | Philadelphia 76ers | 5.8 |

=== Honors ===
The All-Summer League First and Second Teams were selected by a panel of media members in attendance at the Las Vegas NBA Summer League.

All-NBA Summer League First Team

- Tyus Jones, Minnesota Timberwolves (2016 Tournament MVP)
- Jordan McRae, Cleveland Cavaliers
- Bobby Portis, Chicago Bulls
- Ben Simmons, Philadelphia 76ers
- Alan Williams, Phoenix Suns

All-NBA Summer League Second Team

- Jaylen Brown, Boston Celtics
- Thon Maker, Milwaukee Bucks
- Kelly Oubre Jr., Washington Wizards
- Norman Powell, Toronto Raptors
- Tyler Ulis, Phoenix Suns

Championship Game MVP: Jerian Grant, Chicago Bulls
