= 2021–22 Basketball Champions League Americas =

BCL Americas
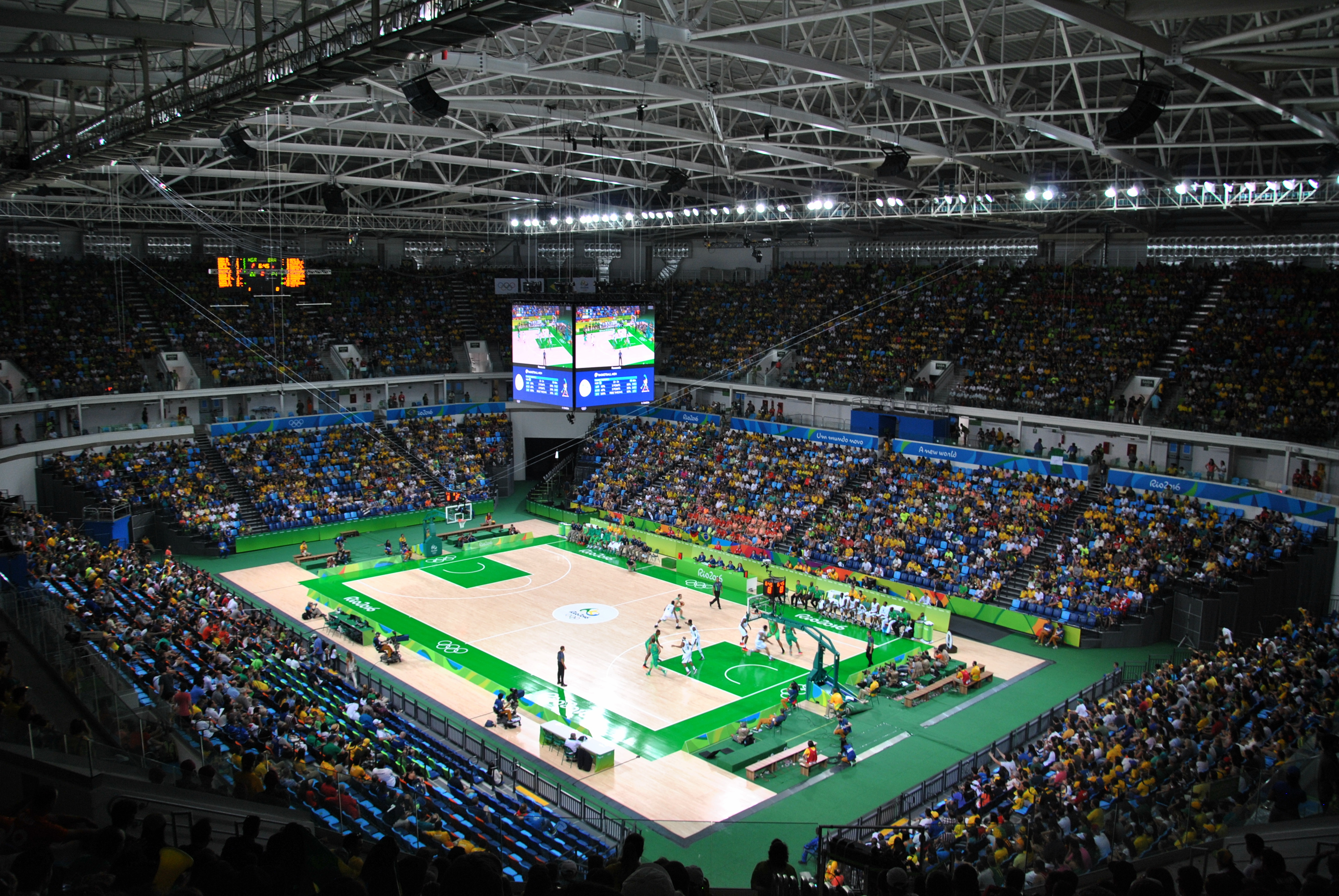
- The Arena Carioca 1 hosted the Final Eight
- Season: 2021–22
- Dates: 10 December 2021 – 9 April 2022
- Teams: 12

Regular season
- Season MVP: Bruno Caboclo (São Paulo)

Final Eight
- Champions: (Brazil) São Paulo (1st league title; 1st continental title)
- Runners-up: (Uruguay) Biguá
- Third place: (Brazil) Minas
- Fourth place: (Argentina) Quimsa

The 2021–22 Basketball Champions League Americas season was the 15h edition of the top-tier level professional club basketball competition in the Americas and the 3rd of the Basketball Champions League Americas (BCLA), since launched by FIBA in 2019. It was also the 23rd season of Pan-American top-level competition, as well as the 60th season of South American top-level competition.

The season concluded with the Final Eight at the Carioca Arena 1 in Rio de Janeiro. São Paulo won its first continental title after defeating Biguá 98–84 in the final. São Paulo forward Bruno Caboclo was named MVP.

== Team allocation ==
On 29 September 2021, FIBA announced the 12 teams from 7 countries to play in the 2021–22 BCLA season.

=== Teams ===
League positions after eventual playoffs of the previous season shown in parentheses. In Argentina, San Lorenzo was crowned champions but were rejected by FIBA due to outstanding debts to players.

Group stage
(Brazil) Flamengo (1st)^{TH}	(Argentina) Quimsa (2nd)	(Uruguay) Biguá (1st)	(Chile) Universidad de Concepción (1st)
(Brazil) São Paulo (2nd)	(Argentina) Boca Juniors (3rd)	(Uruguay) Nacional (2nd)	(Puerto Rico) Cangrejeros de Santurce (QF)
(Brazil) Minas Tênis (3rd)	(Argentina) Obras Sanitarias (9th)	(Nicaragua) Real Estelí (1st)	(Canada) Edmonton Stingers (1st)

The labels in the parentheses show how each team qualified for the place of its starting round:

- 1st, 2nd, etc.: League position after Playoffs
- TH: Title holders
- SF: League semifinalist
- QF: League quarterfinalist
- CW: Preseason tournament winners
- WC: Qualified through Wild Card

== Group phase ==
The draw for the regular season was held on 16 October 2021. The group phase began on 13 December 2021 and ended on 16 March 2022.

=== Group A ===
Pos	Team	Pld	W	L	PF	PA	PD	Pts	Qualification
1	(Puerto Rico) Cangrejeros de Santurce	6	3	3	521	482	+39	9 (Note: Head-to-head: the ranking was based on points difference: 1) Cangrejeros +39, 2) Estelí +18, 3) Stingers –57.)	Advance to Final Eight
2	(Nicaragua) Real Estelí	6	3	3	515	497	+18	9	Advance to Final Eight
3	(Canada) Edmonton Stingers	6	3	3	461	518	−57	9	

Source: BCL Americas

=== Group B ===
Pos	Team	Pld	W	L	PF	PA	PD	Pts	Qualification
1	(Brazil) São Paulo	6	6	0	552	443	+109	12	Advance to Final Eight
2	(Argentina) Quimsa	6	2	4	473	498	−25	8	Advance to Final Eight
3	(Uruguay) Nacional	6	1	5	461	545	−84	7	

Source: BCL Americas

=== Group C ===
Pos	Team	Pld	W	L	PF	PA	PD	Pts	Qualification
1	(Uruguay) Biguá	6	4	2	480	490	−10	10	Advance to Final Eight
2	(Brazil) Minas	6	3	3	493	480	+13	9	Advance to Final Eight
3	(Argentina) Obras Sanitarias	6	2	4	480	483	−3	8	

Source: BCL Americas

=== Group D ===
Pos	Team	Pld	W	L	PF	PA	PD	Pts	Qualification
1	(Brazil) Flamengo	6	5	1	494	394	+100	11	Advance to Final Eight
2	(Argentina) Boca Juniors	6	4	2	452	435	+17	10	Advance to Final Eight
3	(Chile) Universidad de Concepción	6	0	6	385	502	−117	6	

Source: BCL Americas

== Final Eight ==
The Final Eight took place from 6 to 9 April 2022 at the Carioca Arena 1 in Rio de Janeiro, Brazil. The Ginásio do Maracanãzinho was originally chosen to host the Final Eight, but this was changed on 30 March 2022.

=== Bracket ===
Quarterfinals
6 April
(Brazil) Flamengo	83
(Brazil) Minas	85
6 April
(Brazil) São Paulo	75
(Nicaragua) Real Estelí	71
6 April
(Puerto Rico) Cangrejeros de Santurce	79
(Argentina) Quimsa	87
6 April
(Uruguay) Biguá	99
(Argentina) Boca Juniors	81

Semifinals
7 April
(Brazil) Minas	79
(Brazil) São Paulo	93
7 April
(Argentina) Quimsa	91
(Uruguay) Biguá	98

Final
9 April
(Brazil) São Paulo	98
(Uruguay) Biguá	84
Third place game
9 April
(Brazil) Minas	91
(Argentina) Quimsa	81

=== Quarterfinals ===
6 April 2022	Cangrejeros de Santurce (Puerto Rico)	79–87	(Argentina) Quimsa	Rio de Janeiro
12:40	Scoring by quarter: 18–31, 18–19, 22–22, 21–15
	Pts: Barea 13; Rebs: Clemente 8 Asts: Barea 5	Boxscore	Pts: Thomas 16; Rebs: Anderson 14; Asts: Brussino 5	Arena: Carioca Arena 1 Referees: Daniel García (VEN), Andrés Bartel (URU), Diego Chiconato (BRA)

6 April 2022	São Paulo (Brazil)	75–71	(Nicaragua) Real Estelí	Rio de Janeiro
15:10	Scoring by quarter: 18–16, 24–11, 15–22, 18–22
	Pts: Marquinhos 23; Rebs: Caboclo 9 Asts: Elinho 4	Boxscore	Pts: De Jesús, Romero 21; Rebs: Romero 18; Asts: Mendoza 3	Arena: Carioca Arena 1 Referees: Roberto Vásquez (PUR), Carlos Peralta (ECU), Kristian Páez (ECU)

6 April 2022	Biguá (Uruguay)	99–81	(Argentina) Boca Juniors	Rio de Janeiro
17:40	Scoring by quarter: 25–18, 26–18, 23–29, 25–16
	Pts: Sims 37; Rebs: Santos 10; Asts: Vidal 14	Boxscore	Pts: Schattman 19; Rebs: Vargas 9 Asts: Schattman 6	Arena: Carioca Arena 1 Referees: Jorge Vásquez (PUR), Felipe Ibarra (CHI), Andreia Silva (BRA)

6 April 2022	Flamengo (Brazil)	83–85	(Brazil) Minas	Rio de Janeiro
20:40	Scoring by quarter: 25–23, 12–16, 22–18, 24–28
	Pts: Yago 29; Rebs: Olivinha 8 Asts: Balbi 5	Boxscore	Pts: Alexey 18; Rebs: Deodato 5 Asts: Alexey 12	Arena: Carioca Arena 1 Referees: Juan Fernández (ARG), Julio Anaya (PAN), Danilo Molina (ARG)

=== Semifinals ===
7 April 2022	Quimsa (Argentina)	91–98	(Uruguay) Biguá	Rio de Janeiro
17:40	Scoring by quarter: 20–17, 20–30, 26–16, 25–35
	Pts: Brussino 22; Rebs: Anderson 12; Asts: Brussino 4	Boxscore	Pts: Sims 34; Rebs: Santos 13; Asts: Sims 8	Arena: Carioca Arena 1 Referees: Julio Anaya (PAN), Daniel García (VEN), Kristian Páez (ECU)

7 April 2022	Minas (Brazil)	79–93	(Brazil) São Paulo	Rio de Janeiro
20:40	Scoring by quarter: 19–20, 18–29, 19–19, 23–25
	Pts: Renan 22; Rebs: Renan 6 Asts: Alexey 6	Boxscore	Pts: Caboclo 28; Rebs: Caboclo 12; Asts: Elinho 6	Arena: Carioca Arena 1 Referees: Jorge Vásquez (PUR), Andrés Bartel (URU), Diego Chiconato (BRA)

=== Third place game ===
9 April 2022	Minas (Brazil)	91–81	(Argentina) Quimsa	Rio de Janeiro
16:10	Scoring by quarter: 19–28, 27–17, 22–18, 23–18
	Pts: Deodato 24; Rebs: Miller 11; Asts: Alexey 11	Boxscore	Pts: Terry 25; Rebs: Anderson 4 Asts: Baralle 3	Arena: Carioca Arena 1 Referees: Daniel García (VEN), Andrés Bartel (URU), Carlos Peralta (ECU)

=== Final ===
9 April 2022	São Paulo (Brazil)	98–84	(Uruguay) Biguá	Rio de Janeiro
19:10	Scoring by quarter: 30–26, 27–21, 27–13, 14–24
	Pts: Caboclo 29; Rebs: Bennett 8 Asts: Elinho 12	Boxscore	Pts: Rudd 20; Rebs: Rudd 9 Asts: Vidal 9	Arena: Carioca Arena 1 Referees: Jorge Vásquez (PUR), Julio Anaya (PAN), Juan Fernández (ARG)

== Statistics ==
The following were the statistical leaders in the 2021–22 season.

=== Individual statistic leaders ===
Category	Player	Team(s)	Statistic
Efficiency per game	(Brazil) Bruno Caboclo	São Paulo	32.8
Points per game	(United States) Donald Sims	Biguá	24.8
Rebounds per game	(Puerto Rico) Ismael Romero	Real Estelí	11.1
Assists per game	(Uruguay) Santiago Vidal	Biguá	9.0
Steals per game	(Dominican Republic) Rigoberto Mendoza	Real Estelí	3.0
Blocks per game	(Brazil) Bruno Caboclo	São Paulo	3.6
Turnovers per game	(Argentina) Carlos Schattmann	Boca Juniors	3.6
Minutes per game	(Brazil) Bruno Caboclo	São Paulo	36.2
FG%	(Brazil) Bruno Caboclo	São Paulo	63.6%
3P%	(United States) Cordero Bennett	São Paulo	68.8%

=== Individual game highs ===
Category	Player	Team	Statistic
Efficiency	(Brazil) Bruno Caboclo	São Paulo	44
Points	(United States) Dominique Morrison	Nacional	42
Rebounds	(Puerto Rico) Ismael Romero	Real Estelí	18
Assists	(Uruguay) Santiago Vidal	Biguá	14
Steals	(United States) Alexander Franklin	Real Estelí	6
Blocks	(Brazil) Bruno Caboclo	São Paulo	8
Three pointers	(United States) Shamell Stallworth	São Paulo	7
