= European Champions Cup =

European Champions Cup may refer to:

- FIBA European Champions Cup, the former men's basketball club championship of Europe and officially recognized as predecessor to today's Euroleague
- IIHF European Champions Cup, an annual ice hockey tournament, featuring the champions of national IIHF competitions
- UEFA Champions League, formerly known as the European Cup, a football club tournament
- European Champions' Cup (bridge), an annual bridge tournament organised by the European Bridge League.
- European Champion Clubs' Cup, the cup given to the winners of the UEFA Champions League
  - European Champion Clubs Cup (athletics), the sport of athletics meeting with the same name
- European Rugby Champions Cup, an annual European rugby union tournament

== See also ==
- European Cup (disambiguation)
