= European Nations' Cup =

European Nations Cup may refer to:

- UEFA European Championship, formerly known as European Nations' Cup
- Europcar Cup, a European Tour golf tournament
- European Nations Cup (golf), a European Ladies Tour golf tournament
- European Nations Cup (field hockey)
- Rugby League European Championship, formerly known as the European Championship and European Nations Cup
- European Nations Cup (rugby union)

== See also ==
- ENC (disambiguation)
- European Cup (disambiguation)
