= 2022 BCL Americas Final =

- Event: 2021–22 BCL Americas
São Paulo	Biguá
(Brazil)	(Uruguay)
(8–0)	(7–1)
98	84
Head coach: Bruno Mortari	Head coach: Diego Gutierrez
	1	2	3	4	Total
São Paulo	30	27	27	14	98
Biguá	26	21	13	24	84
- Date: 9 April 2022
- Venue: Arena Carioca 1, Rio de Janeiro
- MVP: Bruno Caboclo

The 2022 BCL Americas Final was the final game of the 2021–22 BCL Americas, the 3rd season of the league under its new entity and the 15th of the Pan-American premier basketball league organised by FIBA. It was played at the Arena Carioca 1 in Rio de Janeiro on 9 April 2022. The game was played between Brazilian club São Paulo and the Uruguayan club Biguá.

São Paulo won its first-ever continental title, just 4 years after the resurrection of the club's basketball section. Bruno Caboclo was the team's key player and won the league's MVP award.

== Teams ==
In the following table, finals until 2020 were in the FIBA Americas League and South American Championship eras.

Team	Previous final appearances (bold indicates winners)
(Brazil) São Paulo	None
(Uruguay) Biguá	1 (**1992**)

== Road to the final ==
(Brazil) São Paulo		Round	(Uruguay) Biguá	
Opponent	Result	Group phase	Opponent	Result
(Uruguay) Nacional	98–73 (Santiago del Estero)	Gameday 1	(Brazil) Minas	73–95 (Belo Horizonte)
(Argentina) Quimsa	83–74 (Santiago del Estero)	Gameday 2	(Argentina) Obras Sanitarias	95–84 (Belo Horizonte)
(Uruguay) Nacional	89–73 (Montevideo)	Gameday 3	(Argentina) Obras Sanitarias	92–81 (H)
(Argentina) Quimsa	86–69 (Montevideo)	Gameday 4	(Brazil) Minas	96–91 (H)
(Argentina) Quimsa	95–73 (H)	Gameday 5	(Brazil) Minas	73–62 (Buenos Aires)
(Uruguay) Nacional	101–81 (H)	Gameday 6	(Argentina) Obras Sanitarias	77–96 (Buenos Aires)
**Group B first place**: Pos / Team / Pld / Pts; **1** / (Brazil) São Paulo / **6** / **12**; 2 / (Argentina) Quimsa / 6 / **8**; 3 / (Uruguay) Nacional / 6 / **7**; Source: BCL Americas		Group phase	**Group D first place**: Pos / Team / Pld / Pts; **1** / (Uruguay) Biguá / **6** / **10**; 2 / (Brazil) Minas / 6 / **9**; 3 / (Argentina) Obras Sanitarias / 6 / **8**; Source: BCL Americas	
Opponent	Result	Playoffs	Opponent	Result
(Nicaragua) Real Estelí	75–71	Quarterfinals	(Argentina) Boca Juniors	99–81
(Brazil) Minas	93–79	Semifinals	(Argentina) Quimsa	98–91

- (H): Home game
- (A): Away game
- (N): Neutral venue

== Game details ==
13 April 2021	**São Paulo** (Brazil)	**98**–84	(Uruguay) Biguá	Rio de Janeiro
19:10 GMT–6	Scoring by quarter: **30**–26, **27**–21, **27**–13, 14–**24**
	Pts: Caboclo 29; Rebs: Bennett 8 Asts: Elinho 12	Boxscore	Pts: Rudd 20; Rebs: Rudd 9 Asts: Vidal 9	Arena: Carioca Arena 1 Referees: Jorge Vásquez (Puerto Rico), Julio Anaya (Panama), Juan Fernández (Argentina)

Starters:			Pts	Reb	Ast
PG	5	(Brazil) Elinho	16	4	12
SG	3	(United States) Corderro Bennett	17	8	1
SF	11	(Brazil) Marquinhos	16	6	6
PF	0	(United States) Tyrone Curnell	10	4	1
C	50	(Brazil) Bruno Caboclo	29	7	0
Reserves:					
SF	4	(Brazil) Alex Dória	DNP		
SF	7	(Brazil) Isaac	2	1	1
SG	8	(United States) Shamell Stallworth	0	0	0
PG	10	(Brazil) Henrique Coelho	5	3	1
PG	18	(Brazil) Luiz Dos Santos	DNP		
C	92	(Brazil) Lucas Nogueira	3	2	2
Head coach:
(Brazil) Bruno Mortari

**São Paulo**	**Biguá**

São Paulo	Statistics	Biguá
37/68 (54%)	2-pt field goals	29/70 (41%)
18/35 (51%)	3-pt field goals	13/30 (43%)
6/7 (86%)	Free throws	13/19 (68%)
6	Offensive rebounds	13
32	Defensive rebounds	24
38	Total rebounds	37
24	Assists	22
12	Turnovers	10
8	Steals	8
8	Blocks	3
18	Fouls	6

2022 BCL Americas champions

**São Paulo**
1st league title
1st continental title

Starters:			Pts	Reb	Ast
PG	4	(Uruguay) Santiago Vidal	16	7	9
SG	8	(United States) Donald Sims	17	3	3
SF	7	(Mexico) Iván Loriente Pérez	3	6	2
PF	1	(United States) Victor Rudd	20	9	2
C	23	(Dominican Republic) Luis Santos	19	7	1
Reserves:					
PG	13	(Uruguay) Hernan Alvarez Plaz	0	0	0
SF	15	(Uruguay) Nicolas Andreolli	0	0	2
C	21	(Uruguay) Guillermo Feijo Martinez	DNP		
PG	25	(Argentina) Diego Pena Garcia	0	0	1
PG	26	(Uruguay) Manuel Saaverda Xifre	1	0	1
G	31	(Uruguay) Alex Lopez Suberbie	3	0	0
F	42	(Uruguay) Martin Rojas	5	3	2
Head coach:
(Uruguay) Diego Gutierrez
