= European Cup (disambiguation) =

The European Cup is the former name of the UEFA Champions League, an annual continental club football competition organised by the Union of European Football Associations.

European Cup or Europe Cup may also refer to:

== Football and rugby ==
- UEFA European Championship, originally called the UEFA European Nations' Cup, football competition held every four years since 1960
- UEFA Cup Winners' Cup, a football club competition
- European Champion Clubs' Cup, football trophy given to the football club that wins the UEFA Champions League
- European Rugby Champions Cup, rugby union competition
- European Rugby Cup, organisers of the above-mentioned rugby union competition from 1995 to 2014
- Rugby League European Championship, held since 1935
- UEFA Women's Champions League, originally called the UEFA Women's Cup, a women's football club competition

== Other ==
- European Cup (athletics), an annual national team competition held from 1965 to 2008
- European Champion Clubs Cup (athletics), an annual national club-team competition
- European Touring Car Cup, auto racing, held annually since 2005
- FIA European Formula Three Cup, auto racing, 1985–1990 and 1999–2002
- Europe Cup (badminton), an annual club competition held from 1978
- European Cup (bandy), an annual club competition first held in 1974
- European Cup (baseball), an annual club competition held from 1963
- European Cup (basketball)
- FIBA European Champions Cup, former name for Euroleague Basketball
- European Chess Club Cup
- European Nations Cup (field hockey)
- European Nations Cup (golf)
- UEG European Cup in Gymnastics, gymnastics
- EHF Champions League, handball, known as the European Cup competition from 1956 to 1993
- EHF European Cup, handball
- European Cup (ice hockey)
- European Cup (ice hockey), International Ice Hockey Federation, 1965–1997
- European Marathon Cup, running
- European Ultramarathon Cup, run annually since 1993
- European Champions League (table tennis)
- European Club Cup of Champions, table tennis club competition, defunct
- CEV Champions League in volleyball, known as the European Cup competition from 1959 to 2000
- European Race Walking Cup, walking, established in 1996

== See also ==
- EuroCup (disambiguation)
- Europa Cup (disambiguation)
- European Nations' Cup (disambiguation)
- European Champions Cup (disambiguation)
