= ENC =

ENC may refer to:

- Eastern Naval Command of the Indian Navy
- Eastern Nazarene College in Quincy, Massachusetts
- Eastern North Carolina
- Effective nuclear charge
- Effective number of codons
- Electronic navigational chart
- En language
- ENC (company), a bus manufacturer previously known as ElDorado National–California
- ENC Press, an American publishing company
- Encapsulin, a protein family
- Enfield Chase railway station, in London
- Equality North Carolina, an American LGBT advocacy group
- Escuela Nacional de Cine, a film school in Caracas, Venezuela
- European Nations' Cup (disambiguation)
- Nancy-Essey Airport, in France
