= Europa Cup =

Europa Cup may refer to:

- Alpine Elf Europa Cup, a European auto racing championship
- Alpine Skiing Europa Cup, an international circuit of alpine skiing competitions
- IIHF European Champions Cup, International Hockey Federation
- IIHF European Women's Champions Cup, a European competition of Women's Ice Hockey clubs
- Korfball Europa Cup
- UEFA Women's Europa Cup, European women's association football competition

== See also ==
- European Cup (disambiguation)
- European Cup for football
- European Rugby Champions Cup
- UEFA Europa League, an annual football club competition
