= Jaron Johnson =

American basketball player (born 1992)

No. 92 – Juvecaserta
- Position: Small forward / power forward
- League: Serie A2

Personal information
- Born: May 5, 1992 (age 34) Tyler, Texas, U.S.
- Listed height: 6 ft 7 in (2.01 m)
- Listed weight: 215 lb (98 kg)

Career information
- High school: John Tyler (Tyler, Texas)
- College: Tyler JC (2010–2012); Louisiana Tech (2012–2014)
- NBA draft: 2014: undrafted
- Playing career: 2014–present

Career history
- 2014–2016: Rio Grande Valley Vipers
- 2016: Perth Wildcats
- 2017: Rio Grande Valley Vipers
- 2017–2018: Ironi Nes Ziona
- 2018–2019: Levallois Metropolitans
- 2019–2020: Élan Chalon
- 2020–2021: JDA Dijon
- 2021–2022: Avtodor
- 2022: UNICS
- 2022–2023: Pallacanestro Varese
- 2023–2024: Çağdaş Bodrumspor
- 2024: Niners Chemnitz
- 2024–2025: Pallacanestro Varese
- 2025–2026: Büyükçekmece
- 2026–present: JuveCaserta
- Stats at Basketball Reference

Jaron Tremel Johnson (born May 5, 1992) is an American professional basketball player for JuveCaserta of the Italian Serie A2. He played college basketball for Tyler Junior College and Louisiana Tech.

== High school career ==
Johnson attended John Tyler High School in Tyler, Texas, where as a senior in 2009–10, he averaged 17 points and eight rebounds per game. He was subsequently picked as MVP and Offensive Player of the Year in district-5A, and named All-East Texas MVP by the Tyler Courier-Times. He was also named MVP of the 2010 Azalea Orthopedics Boys all-star game.

== College career ==
=== Tyler Junior College (2010–2012) ===
As a freshman at Tyler Junior College in 2010–11, Johnson averaged 9.9 points, 4.5 rebounds and 1.5 assists per game, as the Apache went 19–11 and made an appearance in the Region XIV Tournament.

As a sophomore in 2011–12, Johnson played in all 30 games and averaged 13.2 points, 6.6 rebounds and 2.8 assists per game. He was named first-team all-conference and all-region, and led the Apache to an 18–12 record and a quarter-final appearance in the Region XIV Tournament.

=== Louisiana Tech (2012–2014) ===
On April 26, 2012, Johnson signed a National Letter of Intent with the Louisiana Tech Bulldogs.

As a junior in 2012–13, Johnson played in all 34 games for the Bulldogs and averaged 4.6 points and 2.9 rebounds per game. He had his most productive outing against Seattle on January 19, 2013, with a career-high 15 points on 4-of-10 shooting and a career-high eight rebounds.

As a senior in 2013–14, Johnson played in 34 games with 18 starts, including the last 16 games, while averaging 9.1 points in 21.5 minutes per game. He recorded double-digit scoring games 18 times while being the leading scorer in five games. He also finished 12th in Conference USA in field goal shooting percentage (52.9). He registered a lone double-double against FIU on January 11, 2014, with career highs in points (18) and rebounds (11). He later matched his career high in points with 18 against Tulsa on February 6.

== Professional career ==
=== Rio Grande Valley Vipers (2014–2016) ===
==== 2014–15 season ====
After going undrafted in the 2014 NBA draft, Johnson tried out with the Rio Grande Valley Vipers of the NBA Development League in October 2014. His try-out was successful and he made the Vipers' 2014–15 training camp roster. His form during preseason earned him a spot on the Vipers' opening-day roster, and he made his D-League debut on November 14, 2014, against the Austin Spurs, scoring five points in 15 minutes off the bench. He quickly emerged as a valuable contributor for the Vipers, evolving from a reserve playing spotty minutes to a reliable starter. Initially, Johnson was slotted as an energy guy off the bench, but with the Vipers' offense struggling a month into the season, coach Nevada Smith turned to Johnson because of his aggressiveness and intensity. On February 4, 2015, Johnson scored a career-high 35 points on 11-of-17 shooting in a 130–113 win over the Oklahoma City Blue. The Vipers finished the regular season with a 27–23 record, missing a playoff berth in the Western Conference. Johnson appeared in all 50 games for the Vipers in 2014–15, making 38 starts and averaging 15.1 points, 4.5 rebounds and 1.7 assists per game.

==== 2015–16 season ====
In July 2015, Johnson joined the Houston Rockets for the Las Vegas Summer League. In five games for the Rockets, he averaged 9.2 points, 1.6 rebounds and 1.0 steals per game. On September 25, 2015, he signed with the Washington Wizards, but was later waived by the team on October 24 after appearing in six preseason games.

On November 2, 2015, Johnson was reacquired by the Rio Grande Valley Vipers. In 2015–16, he established himself as one of the better two-way guards in the D-League, and evolved into an all-around offensive player. He improved his perimeter shooting and became a sound facilitator in his second year. Johnson and teammate Will Cummings led the Vipers in scoring. On November 27, in just the fifth game of the season, Johnson scored a season-high 30 points in a 123–108 overtime win over the Los Angeles D-Fenders. On February 6, 2016, he tied his season high of 30 points, this time in a 126–112 loss to the D-Fenders. The Vipers finished the regular season with a 29–21 record, entering the playoffs as the third seed in the Western Conference. In the first round of the playoffs, the Vipers faced the Austin Spurs, but despite going up 1–0 in the series, they went on to lose the next two games to bow out of the playoffs with a 2–1 defeat. Johnson had his best effort of the series in Game 2, scoring 19 points. In 53 games for the Vipers in 2015–16, he averaged 18.1 points, 5.6 rebounds, 3.0 assists and 1.1 steals per game.

On June 28, 2016, Johnson was named in the Indiana Pacers' rookie/free agent camp roster, joining the team for the Orlando Summer League. In four games for the Pacers, he averaged 6.0 points and 2.5 rebounds per game. He later joined the NBA D-League Select Team for the Las Vegas Summer League, where in four games, he averaged 11.3 points, 5.3 rebounds and 3.0 assists per game.

=== Perth Wildcats (2016) ===
On July 22, 2016, Johnson signed with the Perth Wildcats for the 2016–17 NBL season. After a less-than-impressive debut for the Wildcats, in which he scored six points off the bench in a loss to the Brisbane Bullets in Brisbane on October 6, Johnson turned it around two days later in Perth's home opener against the Cairns Taipans. While he struggled to make an impact over the first three quarters, Johnson scored 16 points in the fourth quarter and hit a game-tying three-pointer to send the game into overtime. In overtime, he hit another three-pointer to finish the game with 26 points on 10-of-11 shooting, as he led the Wildcats to an 84–74 win. However, after scoring just five points in the following game on October 14, Johnson was released by the Wildcats on October 17. Despite being released, he remained in Perth and continued to train with the team while working out privately with the assistant coaches. His replacement, Andre Ingram, played just two games for the Wildcats before leaving the club after one week. As a result, the Wildcats reactivated Johnson's contract on October 27 ahead of Round 4. In his second game back on November 5 against the Adelaide 36ers, Johnson scored 15 of his 20 points in the first half of the Wildcats' 106–103 win. He also recorded four rebounds and hit six three-pointers. The Wildcats started the season 4–1, but following a Round 12 loss to Adelaide on December 22, they dropped to last place on the ladder with a 7–9 record—in the 78–74 loss, Johnson scored a team-high 21 points. In the wake of what was becoming a dismal season for the Wildcats, the team decided to release Johnson for a second time on December 23. In 14 games for the Wildcats, Johnson averaged 13.1 points, 4.6 rebounds and 1.8 assists per game.

=== Return to the Vipers (2017) ===
On February 23, 2017, Johnson was reacquired by the Rio Grande Valley Vipers. He appeared in 13 games for the Vipers before the team deactivated him on March 30, 2017; he remained deactivated for the rest of the season.

On May 15, 2017, it was revealed by the Australian Sports Anti-Doping Authority (ASADA) that Johnson was sanctioned for a breach of the WADA Anti-Doping Code after testing positive for cannabis. He was tested as part of regular in-competition testing while with the Perth Wildcats after a game against the New Zealand Breakers in November 2016. As a result, Johnson was deemed ineligible to participate in any WADA sanctioned sport from March 24 to June 24, 2017.

In June 2017, Johnson joined the Los Angeles Clippers for the 2017 NBA Summer League. In five games for the Clippers, he averaged 8.0 points and 2.2 rebounds in 15.2 minutes per game.

=== Ironi Nes Ziona (2017–2018) ===
On July 20, 2017, Johnson signed with Ironi Nes Ziona of the Israeli Premier League. On March 2, 2018, Johnson won the Slam Dunk Contest during the 2018 Israeli All-Star Event. On March 21, 2018, Johnson parted ways with Nes Ziona. In 15 games, he averaged 10.5 points, 3.2 rebounds and 1.1 steals per game.

=== Levallois Metropolitans (2018–2019) ===
On March 21, 2018, Johnson signed with French team Levallois Metropolitans for the rest of the season. He continued on with Metropolitans for the 2018–19 season and then played for the Los Angeles Lakers during the 2019 NBA Summer League.

=== Élan Chalon (2019–2020) ===
On June 3, 2019, Johnson signed with Élan Chalon of the LNB Pro A.

=== Dijon (2020–2021) ===
On June 20, 2020, Johnson signed with JDA Dijon Basket of the LNB Pro A.

=== Avtador (2021–2022) ===
On August 21, 2021, he has signed with Avtador of the VTB United League. He averaged 15.3 points, 3.2 rebounds, and 3.1 assists per game.

=== Unics (2022) ===
On March 2, 2022, he has signed with UNICS of the VTB United League.

=== Pallacanestro Varese (2022–2023) ===
On August 9, 2022, he has signed with Pallacanestro Varese of the Lega Basket Serie A (LBA).

=== Çağdaş Bodrumspor (2023–2024) ===
On June 26, 2023, he signed with Çağdaş Bodrumspor of the Basketbol Süper Ligi.

=== Niners Chemnitz (2024) ===
On July 25, 2024, Niners Chemnitz of the Basketball Bundesliga confirmed a new contract. Johnson was let go by the Niners in October 2024.

=== Return to Pallacanestro Varese (2025–present) ===
On October 23, 2024, he signed with Pallacanestro Varese of the Lega Basket Serie A (LBA).

=== Büyükçekmece (2025–2026) ===
On August 18, 2025, he signed with ONVO Büyükçekmece of the Basketbol Süper Ligi (BSL).

== Personal life ==
Johnson is the son of Michael and Cynthia Johnson, and has two older brothers, Jeremy and Justin. Justin played at Tyler Junior College and the University of Iowa, and has played professionally in Canada. His father died in January 2017 after a battle with cancer.
