= EuroCup =

Eurocup or EuroCup may refer to:

== Basketball ==
- EuroCup Basketball, second-tier level European professional men's basketball competition
- FIBA Europe Cup, fourth-tier level European professional men's basketball competition
- EuroCup Women, the second-caliber professional women's basketball league

== Motorsport ==
- Eurocup Formula Renault 2.0, a Formula Renault 2.0 championship
- Formula Renault V6 Eurocup, former (2003–2004) Formula Renault 3.5 championship
- Eurocup Mégane Trophy, a Renault Mégane championship, started in 2005
- SEAT León Eurocup, Seat León touring car racing series by SEAT Sport

== See also ==
- European Cup (disambiguation)
- Euro Bowl (rugby league)
- Eurobowl, European American football contest
- Euro-Cup, a horse race in Germany
- European Aquatics Euro Cup, a water polo competition
- UEFA European Championship, association football competition involving the men's national teams of UEFA
