= Victor Rudd =

American basketball player (born 1991)

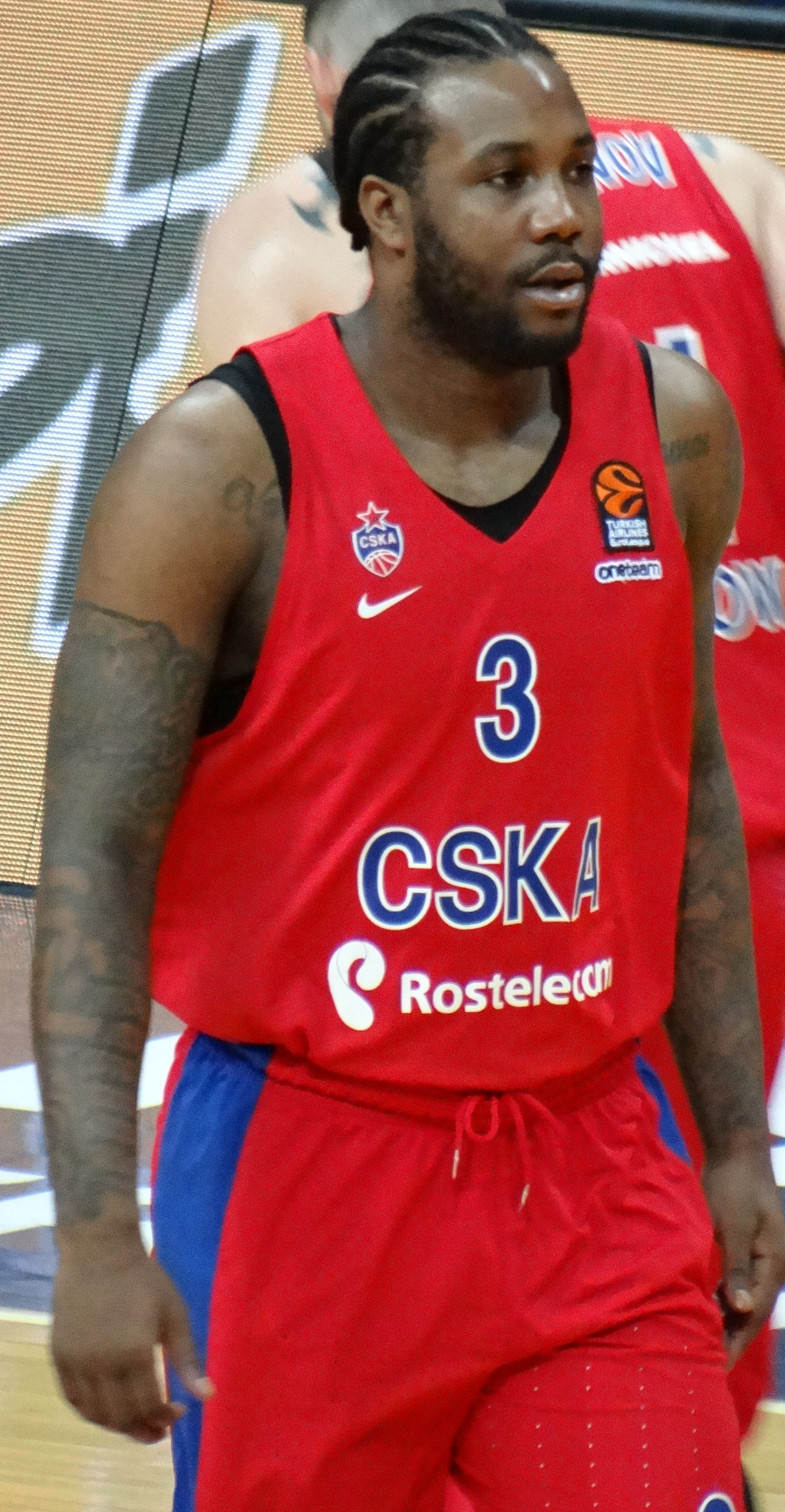
- Rudd with CSKA Moscow in 2018

Calor de Cancún
- Position: Power forward
- League: LNBP

Personal information
- Born: March 18, 1991 (age 35) Los Angeles, California, U.S.
- Listed height: 6 ft 9 in (2.06 m)
- Listed weight: 240 lb (109 kg)

Career information
- High school: Findlay Prep (Henderson, Nevada)
- College: Arizona State (2009–2010); South Florida (2011–2014)
- NBA draft: 2014: undrafted
- Playing career: 2014–present

Career history
- 2014–2015: Delaware 87ers
- 2015–2016: Nizhny Novgorod
- 2016–2017: Maccabi Tel Aviv
- 2017–2018: Gaziantep
- 2018: CSKA Moscow
- 2018: Auxilium Torino
- 2019: Capitanes de Arecibo
- 2019–2020: s.Oliver Würzburg
- 2020: Stal Ostrów Wielkopolski
- 2020: Capitanes de Arecibo
- 2021: Biguá
- 2021: Cariduros de Fajardo
- 2021–2022: Biguá
- 2022: Cariduros de Fajardo
- 2022: Spartans Distrito Capital
- 2022–2023: Biguá
- 2023: Cariduros de Fajardo
- 2023: Gigantes de Carolina
- 2023–2024: Aguada
- 2024: Brillantes del Zulia
- 2024–2025: Al-Arabi
- 2025: Peñarol
- 2025–2026: Sulaibikhat SC
- 2026: Defensor Sporting
- 2026–present: El Calor de Cancún

Career highlights
- 3× Uruguayan LUB champion (2021, 2022, 2024); All-EuroCup Second Team (2016); Israeli Cup winner (2017); Israeli League All-Star (2017)

Victor Dewayne Rudd (born March 18, 1991) is an American professional basketball player for El Calor de Cancún of the Liga Nacional de Baloncesto Profesional (LNBP). He played college basketball at the Arizona State University and the University of South Florida. At a height of 6 ft 9 in (2.06 m), he plays at the power forward position.

== High school and college career ==
Rudd played high school basketball at Findlay Prep, in Henderson, Nevada.

Rudd played college basketball at Arizona State University, with the Sun Devils, from 2009 to 2010, and at the University of South Florida, with the Bulls, from 2011 to 2014.

== Professional career ==
Rudd began his career in the NBA D-League, in the 2014–15 season, with the Delaware 87ers. On July 29, 2015, Rudd joined Nizhny Novgorod of the Russian VTB United League and European-wide 2nd tier level EuroCup. After a successful EuroCup season, in which he averaged 15.8 points and 6.7 rebounds per game, Rudd was named to the All-EuroCup Second Team.

On August 18, 2016, Rudd signed a one-year contract with the Israeli team Maccabi Tel Aviv. During his season with the club, Rudd was selected to the Israeli League All-Star game and helped Maccabi to win the Israeli Basketball State Cup title.

On September 2, 2017, Rudd signed with the Turkish team Gaziantep Basketbol for the 2017–18 season.

On February 15, 2018, Rudd signed with CSKA Moscow of the VTB United League and the EuroLeague for a one-month temporary contract with an option to prolong it for the rest of the season, which CSKA exercised on March 17. Rudd officially parted ways with the team on May 23, 2018. On September 17, Rudd signed with Auxilium Torino of the Italian Lega Basket Serie A.

On October 13, 2019, he has signed with s.Oliver Würzburg of the German Basketball Bundesliga. After averaging 7 points, 3.8 rebounds and 2.5 assists per game in the Bundesliga, Rudd parted ways with the team on February 18, 2020. On August 6, he signed with Stal Ostrów Wielkopolski of the Polish Basketball League. After averaging 8.7 points per game in his first three games, Rudd was released by the team on September 15. On October 13, he signed with Capitanes de Arecibo of the Baloncesto Superior Nacional.

During the 2021–22 season, Rudd returned to Club Biguá de Villa Biarritz for his second stint. On April 10, 2022, he had team-highs of 20 points and 9 rebounds in the 2022 BCL Americas Final, which Biguá lost to São Paulo. On June 13, 2022, Rudd won his second LUB title with Biguá after defeating Peñarol 98–76 in the league finals.

In August 2022, Rudd joined Spartans Distrito Capital of the Venezuelan SPB.

On June 19, 2024, Rudd signed with Brillantes del Zulia.

On October 2, 2024, Rudd signed with Al-Arabi of the Qatari Basketball League.

On January 31, 2025, Rudd signed with Peñarol of the Uruguayan Basketball League (LUB).

On December 24, 2025, Rudd signed with Sulaibikhat SC of the Kuwaiti Division I Basketball League.

On February 4, 2026, Rudd returned to Uruguay, signing with Defensor Sporting for the remainder of the 2025–26 LUB season. He averaged 15.2 points, 5.3 rebounds and 2.5 assists over 13 league games.

== The Basketball Tournament ==
Victor Rudd played for HBC Sicklerville in the 2018 edition of The Basketball Tournament. He scored 9 points and had 8 rebounds in the team's first-round loss to the Talladega Knights.

== Career statistics ==
Legend
GP	Games played	GS	Games started	MPG	Minutes per game
FG%	Field-goal percentage	3P%	3-point field-goal percentage	FT%	Free-throw percentage
RPG	Rebounds per game	APG	Assists per game	SPG	Steals per game
BPG	Blocks per game	PPG	Points per game	PIR	Performance index rating
**Bold**	Career high

=== EuroLeague ===
Year	Team	GP	GS	MPG	FG%	3P%	FT%	RPG	APG	SPG	BPG	PPG	PIR
2016–17	Maccabi	**30**	**20**	**25.8**	**.460**	**.364**	.781	**4.3**	**1.7**	**.7**	**.3**	**10.1**	**10.3**
2017–18	CSKA Moscow	13	1	10.1	.346	.286	**.889**	1.2	.3	.5	.2	2.3	2.3
Career		43	21	21.1	.449	.353	.795	3.3	1.3	.6	.3	7.7	7.9
