= 2018–19 San Antonio Spurs season =

- Head coach: Gregg Popovich
- President: Gregg Popovich; Brent Barry (vice)
- General manager: R. C. Buford
- Owner: Peter Holt
- Arena: AT&T Center

Results
- Record: 48–34 (.585)
- Place: Division: 2nd (Southwest); Conference: 7th (Western)
- Playoff finish: First round (lost to Nuggets 3–4)
- Stats at Basketball Reference

Local media
- Television: Fox Sports Southwest; KENS; KMYS
- Radio: 1200 WOAI

The 2018–19 San Antonio Spurs season was the 52nd season in the history of the franchise, and the 43rd in the National Basketball Association (NBA) and the 46th in the San Antonio area.

The Spurs finished the season with a 48–34 record and earned the seventh seed in the Western Conference playoffs. The team set an NBA record with its 22nd consecutive playoff appearance. In the first round of the playoffs, the Spurs lost to the Denver Nuggets in seven games. Their elimination marked the start of a six-season playoff drought for the Spurs until they clinched a postseason appearance in the 2025–26 season.

== Season synopsis ==
During the 2018 offseason, star forward Kawhi Leonard requested a trade. Sources state Leonard was growing unhappy with how the organization treated him following his rehabilitation from a quad injury. He and Danny Green were traded to the Toronto Raptors in exchange for DeMar DeRozan, Jakob Pöltl, and a 2019 protected first-round pick on July 18, 2018.

The 2018–19 season was the first season since 2000–01 in which point guard Tony Parker was not on the team. After 17 years with the Spurs, he signed with the Charlotte Hornets in the off-season. It was also the first season since the 2001–02 season without Manu Ginóbili, who retired from the NBA on August 27, 2018, officially ending what was the Spurs' "Big Three" era. The departures of Parker, Danny Green, and Kawhi Leonard, and the retirement of Ginóbili, left Patty Mills as the longest-tenured Spur on the roster. Mills and Marco Belinelli were the last remaining players on the team who had played for the Spurs' 2014 championship team. On March 28, 2019, the Spurs retired Ginóbili's number 20 jersey.

LaMarcus Aldridge became the only Spurs player to be an all-star this season. Aldridge placed 13th in total points scored and 14th in total rebounds, making him the one of only three players league-wide who placed in the top-15 for both stats. Additionally, Aldridge led the league in total two-point field goal attempts with 674.

The Spurs were defeated in the first round of the NBA Playoffs by the Denver Nuggets in a close 7-game series. Head Coach Gregg Popovich stated that the season was one of outperforming expectations, and that it was one of the more enjoyable seasons of his career as a coach. This was the first season of Popovich and Derozan's partnership, growing into an iconic friendship.

== Draft ==
Round	Pick	Player	Position	Nationality	School / club team
1	18	Lonnie Walker	SG	United States	Miami
2	49	Chimezie Metu	PF	United States	USC

== Roster ==
2018–19 San Antonio Spurs roster
Players

Pos.	No.	Player	Height	Weight	DOB	From
C	12	LaMarcus Aldridge	6 ft 11 in (2.11 m)	260 lb (118 kg)	1985–07–19	Texas
SG	18	Marco Belinelli	6 ft 5 in (1.96 m)	210 lb (95 kg)	1986–03–25	Italy
PF	42	Dāvis Bertāns	6 ft 10 in (2.08 m)	225 lb (102 kg)	1992–11–12	Latvia
SF	33	Dante Cunningham	6 ft 8 in (2.03 m)	230 lb (104 kg)	1987–04–22	Villanova
SG	10	DeMar DeRozan	6 ft 7 in (2.01 m)	220 lb (100 kg)	1989–08–07	USC
C	14	Drew Eubanks (TW)	6 ft 10 in (2.08 m)	245 lb (111 kg)	1997–02–01	Oregon State
PG	11	Bryn Forbes	6 ft 3 in (1.91 m)	190 lb (86 kg)	1993–07–23	Michigan State
PF	22	Rudy Gay	6 ft 8 in (2.03 m)	230 lb (104 kg)	1986–08–17	Connecticut
PF	7	Chimezie Metu	6 ft 11 in (2.11 m)	225 lb (102 kg)	1997–03–22	USC
PG	8	Patty Mills	6 ft 0 in (1.83 m)	180 lb (82 kg)	1988–08–11	Saint Mary's
SF	26	Ben Moore (TW)	6 ft 8 in (2.03 m)	220 lb (100 kg)	1995–05–13	SMU
PF	28	Donatas Motiejūnas	7 ft 0 in (2.13 m)	222 lb (101 kg)	1990-09-20	Lithuania
SG	5	Dejounte Murray (injured)	6 ft 5 in (1.96 m)	170 lb (77 kg)	1996–09–19	Washington
C	25	Jakob Pöltl	7 ft 1 in (2.16 m)	245 lb (111 kg)	1995–10–15	Utah
SF	3	Quincy Pondexter	6 ft 7 in (2.01 m)	230 lb (104 kg)	1988–03–10	Washington
SG	1	Lonnie Walker	6 ft 5 in (1.96 m)	205 lb (93 kg)	1998–12–14	Miami (FL)
SG	4	Derrick White	6 ft 4 in (1.93 m)	190 lb (86 kg)	1994–07–02	Colorado

Coaches
Head coach
- Gregg Popovich
Assistant(s)
- Chip Engelland
- Becky Hammon
- Will Hardy
- Ettore Messina
- Ime Udoka

Legend
- (DP) Unsigned draft pick
- (FA) Free agent
- (S) Suspended
- (GL) On assignment to G League affiliate
- (TW) Two-way affiliate player
- Injured

Roster
Updated: 2019–04–04

== Standings ==
=== Division ===
Southwest Division	W	L	PCT	GB	Home	Road	Div	GP
y – Houston Rockets	53	29	.646	–	31‍–‍10	22‍–‍19	10–6	82
x – San Antonio Spurs	48	34	.585	5.0	32‍–‍9	16‍–‍25	10–6	82
Memphis Grizzlies	33	49	.402	20.0	21‍–‍20	12‍–‍29	8–8	82
New Orleans Pelicans	33	49	.402	20.0	19‍–‍22	14‍–‍27	8–8	82
Dallas Mavericks	33	49	.402	20.0	24‍–‍17	9‍–‍32	4–12	82

=== Conference ===
Western Conference
#	Team	W	L	PCT	GB	GP
1	c – Golden State Warriors *	57	25	.695	–	82
2	y – Denver Nuggets *	54	28	.659	3.0	82
3	x – Portland Trail Blazers	53	29	.646	4.0	82
4	y – Houston Rockets *	53	29	.646	4.0	82
5	x – Utah Jazz	50	32	.610	7.0	82
6	x – Oklahoma City Thunder	49	33	.598	8.0	82
7	x – San Antonio Spurs	48	34	.585	9.0	82
8	x – Los Angeles Clippers	48	34	.585	9.0	82
9	Sacramento Kings	39	43	.476	18.0	82
10	Los Angeles Lakers	37	45	.451	20.0	82
11	Minnesota Timberwolves	36	46	.439	21.0	82
12	Memphis Grizzlies	33	49	.402	24.0	82
13	New Orleans Pelicans	33	49	.402	24.0	82
14	Dallas Mavericks	33	49	.402	24.0	82
15	Phoenix Suns	19	63	.232	38.0	82

== Game log ==
=== Preseason ===
2018 preseason game log
Total: 3–2 (home: 2–1; road: 1–1)
Preseason: 3–2 (home: 2–1; road: 1–1)

Game	Date	Team	Score	High points	High rebounds	High assists	Location Attendance	Record
1	September 30	Miami	104–100	Rudy Gay (13)	Jakob Pöltl (10)	Patty Mills (4)	AT&T Center; 17,024	1–0
2	October 5	Detroit	117–93	Dejounte Murray (16)	Dejounte Murray (11)	DeRozan, Forbes (3)	AT&T Center; 18,121	2–0
3	October 7	Houston	93–108	DeMar DeRozan (22)	LaMarcus Aldridge (7)	DeMar DeRozan (5)	AT&T Center; 18,326	2–1
4	October 10	@ Atlanta	127–130	Rudy Gay (28)	White, Gasol, Pöltl (6)	Pau Gasol (10)	McCamish Pavilion; 7,433	2–2
5	October 12	@ Orlando	100–81	DeMar DeRozan (20)	LaMarcus Aldridge (15)	Aldridge, Gasol, Mills (4)	Amway Center; 16,424	3–2

2018–19 season schedule

=== Regular season ===
2018–19 game log
Total: 48–34 (home: 32–9; road: 16–25)
October: 5–2 (home: 3–1; road: 2–1)

Game	Date	Team	Score	High points	High rebounds	High assists	Location Attendance	Record
1	October 17	Minnesota	W 112–108	DeMar DeRozan (28)	LaMarcus Aldridge (19)	Pau Gasol (6)	AT&T Center; 18,354	1–0
2	October 20	@ Portland	L 108–121	DeMar DeRozan (28)	LaMarcus Aldridge (8)	DeMar DeRozan (9)	Moda Center; 19,461	1–1
3	October 22	@ L.A. Lakers	W 143–142 (OT)	LaMarcus Aldridge (37)	Dante Cunningham (12)	DeMar DeRozan (14)	Staples Center; 18,997	2–1
4	October 24	Indiana	L 96–116	DeMar DeRozan (18)	LaMarcus Aldridge (13)	DeRozan, Forbes (4)	AT&T Center; 18,354	2–2
5	October 27	L.A. Lakers	W 110–106	DeMar DeRozan (30)	DeRozan, Gay (12)	DeMar DeRozan (8)	AT&T Center; 18,589	3–2
6	October 29	Dallas	W 113–108 (OT)	DeMar DeRozan (34)	Rudy Gay (11)	DeMar DeRozan (9)	AT&T Center; 18,354	4–2
7	October 31	@ Phoenix	W 120–90	DeMar DeRozan (25)	Rudy Gay (8)	Bryn Forbes (7)	Talking Stick Resort Arena; 12,328	5–2

November : 5–10 (home: 3–3; road: 2–7)

Game	Date	Team	Score	High points	High rebounds	High assists	Location Attendance	Record
8	November 3	New Orleans	W 109–95	DeMar DeRozan (26)	LaMarcus Aldridge (12)	LaMarcus Aldridge (6)	AT&T Center; 18,354	6–2
9	November 4	Orlando	L 110–117	DeMar DeRozan (25)	Pau Gasol (8)	DeRozan, Gasol (5)	AT&T Center; 18,354	6–3
10	November 7	@ Miami	L 88–95	Patty Mills (20)	LaMarcus Aldridge (16)	DeMar DeRozan (8)	American Airlines Arena; 19,600	6–4
11	November 10	Houston	W 96–89	LaMarcus Aldridge (27)	DeMar DeRozan (11)	Derrick White (8)	AT&T Center; 18,354	7–4
12	November 12	@ Sacramento	L 99–104	DeMar DeRozan (23)	LaMarcus Aldridge (18)	DeMar DeRozan (8)	Golden 1 Center; 15,500	7–5
13	November 14	@ Phoenix	L 96–116	DeMar DeRozan (24)	LaMarcus Aldridge (12)	DeMar DeRozan (4)	Talking Stick Resort Arena; 14,532	7–6
14	November 15	@ L.A. Clippers	L 111–116	DeMar DeRozan (34)	LaMarcus Aldridge (16)	DeRozan, Mills (5)	Staples Center; 17,463	7–7
15	November 18	Golden State	W 104–92	LaMarcus Aldridge (24)	LaMarcus Aldridge (18)	DeMar DeRozan (9)	AT&T Center; 18,354	8–7
16	November 19	@ New Orleans	L 126–140	DeMar DeRozan (21)	LaMarcus Aldridge (10)	DeMar DeRozan (5)	Smoothie King Center; 14,675	8–8
17	November 21	Memphis	L 103–104	DeMar DeRozan (24)	LaMarcus Aldridge (11)	DeMar DeRozan (5)	AT&T Center; 18,354	8–9
18	November 23	@ Indiana	W 111–101	LaMarcus Aldridge (33)	LaMarcus Aldridge (14)	Rudy Gay (7)	Bankers Life Fieldhouse; 17,262	9–9
19	November 24	@ Milwaukee	L 129–135	DeMar DeRozan (34)	Dante Cunningham (10)	DeMar DeRozan (7)	Fiserv Forum; 17,559	9–10
20	November 26	@ Chicago	W 108–107	DeMar DeRozan (21)	DeRozan, Aldridge (8)	Bryn Forbes (6)	United Center; 19,006	10–10
21	November 28	@ Minnesota	L 89–128	Jakob Poeltl (14)	LaMarcus Aldridge (9)	Gay, White (4)	Target Center; 11,023	10–11
22	November 30	Houston	L 105–136	LaMarcus Aldridge (20)	Rudy Gay (8)	Derrick White (9)	AT&T Center; 18,354	10–12

December : 11–5 (home: 9–1; road: 2–4)

Game	Date	Team	Score	High points	High rebounds	High assists	Location Attendance	Record
23	December 2	Portland	W 131–118	DeMar DeRozan (36)	DeRozan, Aldridge (8)	DeRozan, Mills, White (6)	AT&T Center; 18,354	11–12
24	December 4	@ Utah	L 105–139	Jakob Poeltl (20)	Jakob Poeltl (7)	DeMar DeRozan (7)	Vivint Smart Home Arena; 18,306	11–13
25	December 5	@ L.A. Lakers	L 113–121	DeMar DeRozan (32)	LaMarcus Aldridge (9)	Derrick White (5)	Staples Center; 18,997	11–14
26	December 7	L.A. Lakers	W 133–120	DeMar DeRozan (36)	DeRozan, Aldridge, Poeltl (8)	DeMar DeRozan (9)	AT&T Center; 18,354	12–14
27	December 9	Utah	W 110–97	DeMar DeRozan (26)	Rudy Gay (15)	DeMar DeRozan (8)	AT&T Center; 17,834	13–14
28	December 11	Phoenix	W 111–86	Bryn Forbes (24)	Forbes, Poeltl (11)	DeMar DeRozan (9)	AT&T Center; 17,676	14–14
29	December 13	L.A. Clippers	W 125–87	LaMarcus Aldridge (27)	Gay, Poeltl, Cunningham (6)	DeMar DeRozan (7)	AT&T Center; 18,354	15–14
30	December 15	Chicago	L 93–98	LaMarcus Aldridge (29)	LaMarcus Aldridge (12)	Patty Mills (4)	AT&T Center; 18,354	15–15
31	December 17	Philadelphia	W 123–96	Rudy Gay (21)	LaMarcus Aldridge (10)	DeMar DeRozan (7)	AT&T Center; 17,486	16–15
32	December 19	@ Orlando	W 129–90	LaMarcus Aldridge (20)	DeMar DeRozan (7)	DeMar DeRozan (6)	Amway Center; 17,138	17–15
33	December 21	Minnesota	W 124–98	Bryn Forbes (22)	LaMarcus Aldridge (9)	DeMar DeRozan (8)	AT&T Center; 17,708	18–15
34	December 22	@ Houston	L 101–108	DeMar DeRozan (28)	Rudy Gay (8)	DeMar DeRozan (8)	Toyota Center; 18,055	18–16
35	December 26	Denver	W 111–103	DeMar DeRozan (30)	Jakob Poeltl (11)	DeRozan, Belinelli (5)	AT&T Center; 18,408	19–16
36	December 28	@ Denver	L 99–102	DeMar DeRozan (24)	LaMarcus Aldridge (7)	DeMar DeRozan (5)	Pepsi Center; 20,076	19–17
37	December 29	@ L.A. Clippers	W 122–111	LaMarcus Aldridge (38)	DeMar DeRozan (13)	Bryn Forbes (7)	Staples Center; 19,068	20–17
38	December 31	Boston	W 120–111	LaMarcus Aldridge (32)	LaMarcus Aldridge (9)	DeMar DeRozan (10)	AT&T Center; 18,354	21–17

January : 10–5 (home: 6–2; road: 4–3)

Game	Date	Team	Score	High points	High rebounds	High assists	Location Attendance	Record
39	January 3	Toronto	W 125–107	LaMarcus Aldridge (23)	DeMar DeRozan (14)	DeMar DeRozan (11)	AT&T Center; 18,354	22–17
40	January 5	Memphis	W 108–88	Derrick White (19)	DeMar DeRozan (9)	LaMarcus Aldridge (7)	AT&T Center; 18,354	23–17
41	January 7	@ Detroit	W 119–107	DeMar DeRozan (26)	DeMar DeRozan (7)	DeMar DeRozan (9)	Little Caesars Arena; 13,107	24–17
42	January 9	@ Memphis	L 86–96	Forbes, Belinelli (14)	Pau Gasol (12)	DeMar DeRozan (4)	FedExForum; 13,944	24–18
43	January 10	Oklahoma City	W 154–147 (2OT)	LaMarcus Aldridge (56)	LaMarcus Aldridge (9)	DeMar DeRozan (11)	AT&T Center; 18,354	25–18
44	January 12	@ Oklahoma City	L 112–122	Marco Belinelli (24)	Jakob Poeltl (10)	DeRozan, Mills, White (4)	Chesapeake Energy Arena; 18,203	25–19
45	January 14	Charlotte	L 93–108	LaMarcus Aldridge (28)	LaMarcus Aldridge (10)	Derrick White (7)	AT&T Center; 18,354	25–20
46	January 16	@ Dallas	W 105–101	Marco Belinelli (17)	Jakob Poeltl (7)	DeMar DeRozan (9)	American Airlines Center; 20,214	26–20
47	January 18	@ Minnesota	W 116–113	LaMarcus Aldridge (25)	LaMarcus Aldridge (9)	Patty Mills (8)	Target Center; 17,222	27–20
48	January 20	L.A. Clippers	L 95–103	LaMarcus Aldridge (30)	LaMarcus Aldridge (14)	Derrick White (4)	AT&T Center; 18,354	27–21
49	January 23	@ Philadelphia	L 120–122	DeMar DeRozan (26)	DeMar DeRozan (9)	LaMarcus Aldridge (6)	Wells Fargo Center; 20,339	27–22
50	January 26	@ New Orleans	W 126–114	LaMarcus Aldridge (28)	LaMarcus Aldridge (12)	Patty Mills (5)	Smoothie King Center; 17,724	28–22
51	January 27	Washington	W 132–119	LaMarcus Aldridge (30)	LaMarcus Aldridge (9)	Patty Mills (7)	AT&T Center; 18,354	29–22
52	January 29	Phoenix	W 126–124	LaMarcus Aldridge (30)	LaMarcus Aldridge (9)	Belinelli, Gay, Mills, Bertans (5)	AT&T Center; 18,121	30–22
53	January 31	Brooklyn	W 117–114	Derrick White (26)	LaMarcus Aldridge (13)	Derrick White (6)	AT&T Center; 18,057	31–22

February : 3–7 (home: 2–0; road: 1–7)

Game	Date	Team	Score	High points	High rebounds	High assists	Location Attendance	Record
54	February 2	New Orleans	W 113–108	LaMarcus Aldridge (25)	LaMarcus Aldridge (14)	DeMar DeRozan (5)	AT&T Center; 18,354	32–22
55	February 4	@ Sacramento	L 112–127	DeMar DeRozan (24)	LaMarcus Aldridge (9)	Belinelli, DeRozan (4)	Golden 1 Center; 16,245	32–23
56	February 6	@ Golden State	L 102–141	Patty Mills (16)	Cunningham, Metu (5)	Jakob Poeltl (6)	Oracle Arena; 19,596	32–24
57	February 7	@ Portland	L 118–127	DeMar DeRozan (35)	LaMarcus Aldridge (10)	Patty Mills (8)	Moda Center; 19,393	32–25
58	February 9	@ Utah	L 105–125	DeMar DeRozan (23)	LaMarcus Aldridge (10)	Mills, DeRozan (4)	Vivint Smart Home Arena; 18,306	32–26
59	February 12	@ Memphis	W 108–107	Aldridge, Mills (22)	Rudy Gay (12)	Rudy Gay (8)	FedExForum; 13,788	33–26
60	February 22	@ Toronto	L 117–120	DeMar DeRozan (23)	Rudy Gay (10)	DeMar DeRozan (8)	Scotiabank Arena; 20,058	33–27
61	February 24	@ N. Y. Knicks	L 118–130	DeMar DeRozan (32)	Poeltl, DeRozan (9)	Mills, DeRozan (4)	Madison Square Garden; 18,019	33–28
62	February 25	@ Brooklyn	L 85–101	LaMarcus Aldridge (26)	LaMarcus Aldridge (10)	Derrick White (4)	Barclays Center; 13,479	33–29
63	February 27	Detroit	W 105–93	LaMarcus Aldridge (24)	Jakob Poeltl (14)	DeMar DeRozan (8)	AT&T Center; 18,354	34–29

March : 10–4 (home: 7–2; road: 3–2)

Game	Date	Team	Score	High points	High rebounds	High assists	Location Attendance	Record
64	March 2	Oklahoma City	W 116–102	LaMarcus Aldridge (27)	LaMarcus Aldridge (10)	DeMar DeRozan (7)	AT&T Center; 18,354	35–29
65	March 4	Denver	W 104–103	DeMar DeRozan (24)	LaMarcus Aldridge (9)	Derrick White (9)	AT&T Center; 18,354	36–29
66	March 6	@ Atlanta	W 111–104	LaMarcus Aldridge (32)	Rudy Gay (11)	Derrick White (9)	State Farm Arena; 15,208	37–29
67	March 10	Milwaukee	W 121–114	LaMarcus Aldridge (29)	LaMarcus Aldridge (16)	DeMar DeRozan (6)	AT&T Center; 18,594	38–29
68	March 12	@ Dallas	W 112–105	DeMar DeRozan (33)	Aldridge, Poeltl (7)	Derrick White (7)	American Airlines Center; 20,366	39–29
69	March 15	N. Y. Knicks	W 109–83	LaMarcus Aldridge (18)	LaMarcus Aldridge (11)	White, DeRozan (7)	AT&T Center; 18,354	40–29
70	March 16	Portland	W 108–103	DeMar DeRozan (21)	DeRozan, Aldridge (8)	Patty Mills (4)	AT&T Center; 18,354	41–29
71	March 18	Golden State	W 111–105	DeMar DeRozan (26)	LaMarcus Aldridge (13)	DeMar DeRozan (8)	AT&T Center; 18,354	42–29
72	March 20	Miami	L 105–110	Belinelli, Mills, Aldridge (17)	DeMar DeRozan (16)	DeRozan, Mills (6)	AT&T Center; 18,354	42–30
73	March 22	@ Houston	L 105–111	Davis Bertans (20)	Rudy Gay (9)	DeMar DeRozan (8)	Toyota Center; 18,055	42–31
74	March 24	@ Boston	W 115–96	LaMarcus Aldridge (48)	LaMarcus Aldridge (13)	DeMar DeRozan (11)	TD Garden; 18,624	43–31
75	March 26	@ Charlotte	L 116–125 (OT)	DeMar DeRozan (30)	LaMarcus Aldridge (15)	Derrick White (7)	Spectrum Center; 14,227	43–32
76	March 28	Cleveland	W 116–110	DeMar DeRozan (25)	Rudy Gay (8)	DeMar DeRozan (8)	AT&T Center; 18,756	44–32
77	March 31	Sacramento	L 106–113	LaMarcus Aldridge (27)	LaMarcus Aldridge (18)	DeMar DeRozan (7)	AT&T Center; 18,581	44–33

April : 4–1 (home: 2–0; road: 2–1)

Game	Date	Team	Score	High points	High rebounds	High assists	Location Attendance	Record
78	April 2	Atlanta	W 117–111	DeMar DeRozan (29)	Gay, Aldridge (11)	DeMar DeRozan (7)	AT&T Center; 18,354	45–33
79	April 3	@ Denver	L 85–113	Aldridge, Walker (16)	Rudy Gay (8)	Forbes, DeRozan (3)	Pepsi Center; 17,643	45–34
80	April 5	@ Washington	W 129–112	LaMarcus Aldridge 24)	Aldridge, Poeltl (7)	Derrick White (8)	Capital One Arena; 20,409	46–34
81	April 7	@ Cleveland	W 112–90	LaMarcus Aldridge (18)	LaMarcus Aldridge (13)	DeMar DeRozan (9)	Quicken Loans Arena; 19,432	47–34
82	April 10	Dallas	W 105–94	LaMarcus Aldridge (34)	LaMarcus Aldridge (16)	Patty Mills (5)	AT&T Center; 18,581	48–34

2018–19 season schedule

== Playoffs ==
=== Game log ===
2019 playoff game log
First Round: 3–4 (home: 2–1; road: 1–3)

Game	Date	Team	Score	High points	High rebounds	High assists	Location Attendance	Series
1	April 13	@ Denver	W 101–96	DeMar DeRozan (18)	DeMar DeRozan (12)	DeMar DeRozan (6)	Pepsi Center; 19,520	1–0
2	April 16	@ Denver	L 105–114	DeMar DeRozan (31)	Rudy Gay (9)	Patty Mills (5)	Pepsi Center; 19,520	1–1
3	April 18	Denver	W 118–108	Derrick White (36)	Aldridge, Gay (11)	Aldridge, DeRozan, White (5)	AT&T Center; 18,354	2–1
4	April 20	Denver	L 103–117	LaMarcus Aldridge (24)	Aldridge, Pöltl (9)	DeRozan, White (5)	AT&T Center; 18,354	2–2
5	April 23	@ Denver	L 90–108	Aldridge, DeRozan (17)	LaMarcus Aldridge (10)	Jakob Pöltl (4)	Pepsi Center; 19,520	2–3
6	April 25	Denver	W 120–103	LaMarcus Aldridge (26)	LaMarcus Aldridge (10)	DeMar DeRozan (7)	AT&T Center; 18,354	3–3
7	April 27	@ Denver	L 86–90	Rudy Gay (21)	LaMarcus Aldridge (11)	DeMar DeRozan (6)	Pepsi Center; 19,725	3–4

2019 playoff schedule

== Player statistics ==
=== Regular season ===
Player	Pos.	GP	GS	MP	Reb.	Ast.	Stl.	Blk.	Pts.
LaMarcus Aldridge	C	81	81	2,687	744	194	43	107	1,727
Marco Belinelli	SG	79	1	1,815	198	132	35	8	829
Dāvis Bertāns	PF	76	12	1,632	264	100	35	33	606
Dante Cunningham	PF	64	21	928	188	50	27	13	194
DeMar DeRozan	SG	77	77	2,688	462	475	86	36	1,635
Drew Eubanks	PF	23	0	113	34	7	2	5	41
Bryn Forbes	SG	82	81	2,293	239	175	45	4	967
Pau Gasol^{‡}	C	27	6	330	127	50	5	14	114
Rudy Gay	PF	69	51	1,842	470	182	54	34	946
Chimezie Metu	PF	29	0	145	36	13	6	2	51
Patty Mills	PG	82	1	1,908	182	245	49	10	811
Donatas Motiejūnas	PF	3	0	13	3	1	0	1	6
Jakob Pöltl	C	77	24	1,273	410	93	29	68	423
Quincy Pondexter	SF	53	0	292	46	24	11	1	98
Lonnie Walker	SG	17	0	118	17	9	7	3	45
Derrick White	PG	67	55	1,728	247	263	67	47	663

After all games
^{‡}Waived during the season
^{†}Traded during the season
^{≠}Acquired during the season

=== Playoffs ===
Player	Pos.	GP	GS	MP	Reb.	Ast.	Stl.	Blk.	Pts.
LaMarcus Aldridge	C	7	7	244	67	19	5	7	140
Marco Belinelli	SG	7	0	131	13	8	0	2	41
Dāvis Bertāns	PF	5	0	79	8	5	0	1	16
Dante Cunningham	PF	5	0	13	6	0	0	0	6
DeMar DeRozan	SG	7	7	251	47	32	8	1	154
Bryn Forbes	SG	7	7	212	25	7	1	1	75
Rudy Gay	PF	7	0	179	50	12	3	5	78
Patty Mills	PG	7	0	152	15	25	7	1	37
Donatas Motiejūnas	PF	5	0	19	7	2	0	0	13
Jakob Pöltl	C	7	7	177	54	12	2	5	51
Quincy Pondexter	SF	5	0	12	1	2	1	0	0
Lonnie Walker	SG	6	0	21	2	3	0	0	6
Derrick White	PG	7	7	191	21	21	5	5	106

== Transactions ==
=== Trades ===
July 18, 2018	To San Antonio Spurs DeMar DeRozan; Jakob Pöltl; 2019 protected first-round pick	To Toronto Raptors Kawhi Leonard; Danny Green

=== Free agency ===
==== Re-signed ====
Player	Signed
Dāvis Bertāns	4-year contract worth $14.5 million
Rudy Gay	1-year contract worth $10 million
Bryn Forbes	2-year contract worth $6 million

==== Additions ====
Player	Signed	Former team
Marco Belinelli	2-year contract worth $12 million	Philadelphia 76ers
Dante Cunningham	1-year contract worth $2.5 million	Brooklyn Nets
Quincy Pondexter	1-year contract worth $2.1 million	Chicago Bulls

==== Subtractions ====
Player	Reason left	New team
Joffrey Lauvergne	Unrestricted free agent	(Turkey) Fenerbahçe Beko
Kyle Anderson	Restricted free agent	Memphis Grizzlies
Tony Parker	Unrestricted free agent	Charlotte Hornets
Brandon Paul	Waived	(China) Zhejiang Golden Bulls
Manu Ginóbili	Retired	—N/a
