= St. John Neumann Regional Academy High School =

St. John Neumann Regional Academy
- Bishop Neumann

Location
- 901 Penn Street, Williamsport, (Lycoming County), Pennsylvania 17701; United States; 41°14′57″N 76°59′48″W

Information
- Type: Private, Coeducational
- Religious affiliation: Roman Catholic
- Established: 2006
- Principal: Mrs. Alisia McNamee
- Chaplain: Reverend Bert Kozen
- Grades: Pre-K 3-12
- Enrollment: 270 (2016)
- Average class size: 15 students
- Colors: Maroon and Gold
- Fight song: "We are Family"
- Athletics conference: Pennsylvania Heartland Athletic Conference
- Sports: Basketball, Soccer, Tennis, Cross Country, Track and Field, Baseball, Softball, Football
- Mascot: Golden Knights
- Nickname: SJNRA, Neumann, St. John Neumann
- Team name: Neumann Knights
- Rivals: South Williamsport Area School District, Loyalsock Township School District, Sullivan County School District, Millville Area School District
- Accreditation: Middle States Association of Colleges and Schools
- Newspaper: "Neumann News"
- Website: www.sjnra.org/home-h

St. John Neumann Regional Academy is a private, Roman Catholic high school in Williamsport, Pennsylvania, United States. It is located in the Roman Catholic Diocese of Scranton.

== Background ==
St. John Neumann is the only Catholic high school serving Lycoming County. It also serves the counties of Union County, Northumberland County, Sullivan County, and Clinton County.

== Shooting ==
On March 7, 2001, 14-year-old student Elizabeth Bush fired a .22 caliber revolver, hitting 13-year-old Kimberly Marchese in the shoulders. Marchese was described as stable a few hours later. Bush would admit to the shooting, stating that she had intended to kill herself, but changed her mind because she wanted to "scare" Marchese.

Marchese and her friends had allegedly been bullying Bush prior to the shooting, however Marchese disputes this claim. Bush was not tried as an adult, and sentenced to a care facility, which she was released from in 2004.

== Notable alumni ==
- Alize Johnson, NBA Player (class of 2014)
