= 2018–19 Houston Rockets season =

NBA professional basketball team season

- Division champions
- Head coach: Mike D'Antoni
- General manager: Daryl Morey
- Owners: Tilman Fertitta
- Arena: Toyota Center

Results
- Record: 53–29 (.646)
- Place: Division: 1st (Southwest); Conference: 4th (Western)
- Playoff finish: Conference semifinals (lost to Warriors 2–4)
- Stats at Basketball Reference

Local media
- Television: AT&T SportsNet Southwest
- Radio: Sportstalk 790

The 2018–19 Houston Rockets season was the 52nd season of the franchise in the National Basketball Association (NBA), and their 48th in the Houston area.

Despite early struggles in the season including an on-court altercation between rival guards Chris Paul and Rajon Rondo, injuries among its players, and losing core players including Trevor Ariza, the team made a dramatic improvement and finished as the 4th seed in the West. Most notable within the surge was Harden's impressive play. It included his 30-point streak which started on December 13, all the way to a surprising 32 games until ending on February 25. This streak had left him 2nd for continuous 30+ points in a game, leaving Wilt Chamberlain as 1st. On March 24, against the Pelicans, they clinched another playoff spot for the 7th straight year.

In the playoffs, the Rockets defeated the Utah Jazz in the First Round in five games. However, the Rockets would lose in six games against the two-time defending NBA champion Golden State Warriors in the Western Conference Semifinals, their fourth playoff exit against the Warriors in the last five postseasons. They previously lost to the Warriors in 2015 (conference finals), 2016 (first round), and 2018 (conference finals).

== Draft picks ==
Round	Pick	Player	Position	Nationality	College
2	46	De'Anthony Melton	Guard	United States	USC (So.)

Entering the night of the draft, the Rockets had only one selection at hand, with it being the pick they acquired from the Miami Heat via a previous trade involving the Memphis Grizzlies and Charlotte Hornets, being the lowest second-round pick of those teams. On the night of the draft, the Rockets selected former University of Southern California guard De'Anthony Melton as their sole selection that year. Melton only played one season at USC, playing that previous season as a starter in 25 out of 36 games played there, recording averages of 8.3 points, 4.7 rebounds, 3.5 assists, 1.0 blocks, and 1.9 steals per game that season. He was originally planned to play in his sophomore season, but was suspended and later left in relation to the 2017–18 NCAA Division I men's basketball corruption scandal. Prior to the start of the season, Melton was traded alongside veteran power forward Ryan Anderson to the Phoenix Suns on August 31, 2018, in exchange for veteran point guard Brandon Knight and power forward Marquese Chriss.

== Roster ==
2018–19 Houston Rockets roster
Players

Pos.	No.	Player	Height	Weight	DOB	From
F	7	Carmelo Anthony	6 ft 8 in (2.03 m)	238 lb (108 kg)	1984-05-29	Syracuse
C	15	Clint Capela	6 ft 10 in (2.08 m)	240 lb (109 kg)	1994–05–18	Switzerland
G	2	Chris Chiozza	6 ft 0 in (1.83 m)	175 lb (79 kg)	1995–11–21	Florida
F	6	Gary Clark	6 ft 8 in (2.03 m)	225 lb (102 kg)	1994–11–16	Cincinnati
G	0	Trevon Duval (TW)	6 ft 2 in (1.88 m)	189 lb (86 kg)	1998–08–03	Duke
F	12	Vincent Edwards (TW)	6 ft 7 in (2.01 m)	225 lb (102 kg)	1996–04–05	Purdue
F	35	Kenneth Faried	6 ft 8 in (2.03 m)	220 lb (100 kg)	1989–11–19	Morehead State
G	21	Michael Frazier	6 ft 4 in (1.93 m)	200 lb (91 kg)	1994–03–08	Florida
G	10	Eric Gordon	6 ft 4 in (1.93 m)	215 lb (98 kg)	1988–12–25	Indiana
G/F	14	Gerald Green	6 ft 7 in (2.01 m)	205 lb (93 kg)	1986–01–26	Gulf Shores Academy (TX)
G	13	James Harden	6 ft 5 in (1.96 m)	220 lb (100 kg)	1989–08–26	Arizona State
C	55	Isaiah Hartenstein	7 ft 0 in (2.13 m)	255 lb (116 kg)	1998–05–05	Germany
G/F	4	Danuel House	6 ft 7 in (2.01 m)	227 lb (103 kg)	1993–06–07	Texas A&M
C	42	Nenê	6 ft 11 in (2.11 m)	250 lb (113 kg)	1982–09–13	Brazil
G	3	Chris Paul	6 ft 0 in (1.83 m)	175 lb (79 kg)	1985–05–06	Wake Forest
G	25	Austin Rivers	6 ft 4 in (1.93 m)	200 lb (91 kg)	1992–08–01	Duke
G	1	Iman Shumpert	6 ft 5 in (1.96 m)	215 lb (98 kg)	1990–06–26	Georgia Tech
F	17	P. J. Tucker	6 ft 6 in (1.98 m)	245 lb (111 kg)	1985–05–05	Texas

Coaches
Head coach
- Mike D'Antoni
Assistant(s)
- Matt Brase
- Jeff Bzdelik
- Brett Gunning
- Roy Rogers
- John Lucas (player development)
- Alvin Williams (player development)
- Irving Roland (player development)

Legend
- (DP) Unsigned draft pick
- (FA) Free agent
- (S) Suspended
- (GL) On assignment to G League affiliate
- (TW) Two-way affiliate player
- Injured

Roster
Updated: 2019–03–17

== Standings ==
=== Division ===
Southwest Division	W	L	PCT	GB	Home	Road	Div	GP
y – Houston Rockets	53	29	.646	–	31‍–‍10	22‍–‍19	10–6	82
x – San Antonio Spurs	48	34	.585	5.0	32‍–‍9	16‍–‍25	10–6	82
Memphis Grizzlies	33	49	.402	20.0	21‍–‍20	12‍–‍29	8–8	82
New Orleans Pelicans	33	49	.402	20.0	19‍–‍22	14‍–‍27	8–8	82
Dallas Mavericks	33	49	.402	20.0	24‍–‍17	9‍–‍32	4–12	82

=== Conference ===
Western Conference
#	Team	W	L	PCT	GB	GP
1	c – Golden State Warriors *	57	25	.695	–	82
2	y – Denver Nuggets *	54	28	.659	3.0	82
3	x – Portland Trail Blazers	53	29	.646	4.0	82
4	y – Houston Rockets *	53	29	.646	4.0	82
5	x – Utah Jazz	50	32	.610	7.0	82
6	x – Oklahoma City Thunder	49	33	.598	8.0	82
7	x – San Antonio Spurs	48	34	.585	9.0	82
8	x – Los Angeles Clippers	48	34	.585	9.0	82
9	Sacramento Kings	39	43	.476	18.0	82
10	Los Angeles Lakers	37	45	.451	20.0	82
11	Minnesota Timberwolves	36	46	.439	21.0	82
12	Memphis Grizzlies	33	49	.402	24.0	82
13	New Orleans Pelicans	33	49	.402	24.0	82
14	Dallas Mavericks	33	49	.402	24.0	82
15	Phoenix Suns	19	63	.232	38.0	82

== Game log ==
=== Preseason ===
2018 preseason game log
Total: 4–1 (home: 1–1; road: 3–0)
Preseason: 4–1 (home: 1–1; road: 3–0)

Game	Date	Team	Score	High points	High rebounds	High assists	Location Attendance	Record
1	October 2	@ Memphis	W 131–115	Chris Paul (22)	Green, Capela (6)	Chris Paul (9)	Legacy Arena; 16,888	1–0
2	October 4	Indiana	L 100–110	James Harden (17)	James Ennis III (6)	James Harden (10)	Toyota Center; 17,089	1–1
3	October 7	@ San Antonio	W 108–93	James Harden (21)	Chris Paul (8)	Paul, Harden (9)	AT&T Center; 18,326	2–1
4	October 9	Shanghai Sharks	W 128–86	James Harden (37)	Bruno Caboclo (7)	Paul, Harden (9)	Toyota Center; 16,317	3–1
5	October 12	@ Memphis	W 121–103	James Harden (23)	Clint Capela (13)	Chris Paul (11)	FedEx Forum; 12,576	4–1

2018–19 season schedule

=== Regular season ===
2018–19 game log
Total: 53–29 (home: 31–10; road: 22–19)
October: 1–5 (home: 0–4; road: 1–1)

Game	Date	Team	Score	High points	High rebounds	High assists	Location Attendance	Record
1	October 17	New Orleans	L 112–131	Eric Gordon (21)	James Harden (9)	James Harden (10)	Toyota Center; 18,055	0–1
2	October 20	@ LA Lakers	W 124–115	James Harden (36)	Clint Capela (12)	Chris Paul (10)	Staples Center; 18,997	1–1
3	October 21	@ LA Clippers	L 112–115	James Harden (31)	Capela, Anthony (6)	James Harden (14)	Staples Center; 16,149	1–2
4	October 24	Utah	L 89–100	James Harden (29)	Clint Capela (12)	James Harden (7)	Toyota Center; 18,055	1–3
5	October 26	LA Clippers	L 113–133	Carmelo Anthony (24)	Clint Capela (15)	Chris Paul (8)	Toyota Center; 18,055	1–4
6	October 30	Portland	L 85–104	Chris Paul (17)	Clint Capela (14)	Chris Paul (9)	Toyota Center; 18,055	1–5

November : 9–6 (home: 4–1; road: 5–5)

Game	Date	Team	Score	High points	High rebounds	High assists	Location Attendance	Record
7	November 2	@ Brooklyn	W 119–111	Chris Paul (32)	Clint Capela (13)	Chris Paul (11)	Barclays Center; 14,013	2–5
8	November 3	@ Chicago	W 96–88	James Harden (25)	Clint Capela (12)	Chris Paul (8)	United Center; 20,505	3–5
9	November 5	@ Indiana	W 98–94	James Harden (28)	Clint Capela (10)	Chris Paul (13)	Bankers Life Fieldhouse; 14,735	4–5
10	November 8	@ Oklahoma City	L 80–98	James Harden (19)	James Harden (8)	James Harden (5)	Chesapeake Energy Arena; 18,203	4–6
11	November 10	@ San Antonio	L 89–96	James Harden (25)	Clint Capela (17)	Chris Paul (4)	AT&T Center; 18,354	4–7
12	November 11	Indiana	W 115–103	James Harden (40)	Gary Clark (8)	James Harden (9)	Toyota Center; 18,055	5–7
13	November 13	@ Denver	W 109–99	Clint Capela (24)	Clint Capela (9)	James Harden (11)	Pepsi Center; 16,741	6–7
14	November 15	Golden State	W 107–86	James Harden (27)	Clint Capela (10)	Chris Paul (7)	Toyota Center; 18,055	7–7
15	November 17	Sacramento	W 132–112	James Harden (34)	Clint Capela (16)	Chris Paul (9)	Toyota Center; 18,055	8–7
16	November 21	Detroit	W 126–124	James Harden (43)	Clint Capela (15)	James Harden (9)	Toyota Center; 18,055	9–7
17	November 23	@ Detroit	L 111–116 (OT)	James Harden (33)	Clint Capela (21)	Chris Paul (9)	Little Caesars Arena; 17,268	9–8
18	November 24	@ Cleveland	L 108–117	James Harden (40)	Clint Capela (10)	James Harden (13)	Quicken Loans Arena; 19,432	9–9
19	November 26	@ Washington	L 131–135 (OT)	James Harden (54)	Clint Capela (14)	James Harden (13)	Capital One Arena; 16,872	9–10
20	November 28	Dallas	L 108–128	James Harden (25)	James Harden (11)	James Harden (17)	Toyota Center; 18,055	9–11
21	November 30	@ San Antonio	W 136–105	Clint Capela (27)	Clint Capela (12)	Harden, Paul (10)	AT&T Center; 18,354	10–11

December : 11–4 (home: 9–0; road: 2–4)

Game	Date	Team	Score	High points	High rebounds	High assists	Location Attendance	Record
22	December 1	Chicago	W 121–105	James Harden (30)	Clint Capela (15)	Chris Paul (13)	Toyota Center; 18,055	11–11
23	December 3	@ Minnesota	L 91–103	James Harden (29)	P. J. Tucker (9)	James Harden (8)	Target Center; 13,834	11–12
24	December 6	@ Utah	L 91–118	James Harden (15)	Clint Capela (10)	Chris Paul (5)	Vivint Smart Home Arena; 18,306	11–13
25	December 8	@ Dallas	L 104–107	James Harden (35)	Clint Capela (13)	Harden, Paul (8)	American Airlines Center; 20,254	11–14
26	December 11	Portland	W 111–104	James Harden (29)	Chris Paul (11)	Chris Paul (10)	Toyota Center; 18,055	12–14
27	December 13	LA Lakers	W 126–111	James Harden (50)	Clint Capela (13)	James Harden (11)	Toyota Center; 18,055	13–14
28	December 15	@ Memphis	W 105–97	James Harden (32)	James Harden (12)	Harden, Paul (10)	FedExForum; 16,777	14–14
29	December 17	Utah	W 102–97	James Harden (47)	Clint Capela (14)	Chris Paul (9)	Toyota Center; 18,055	15–14
30	December 19	Washington	W 136–118	James Harden (36)	Clint Capela (12)	James Harden (9)	Toyota Center; 18,055	16–14
31	December 20	@ Miami	L 99–101	James Harden (35)	Clint Capela (14)	James Harden (12)	American Airlines Arena; 19,600	16–15
32	December 22	San Antonio	W 108–101	James Harden (38)	Clint Capela (22)	James Harden (10)	Toyota Center; 18,055	17–15
33	December 25	Oklahoma City	W 113–109	James Harden (41)	Clint Capela (23)	James Harden (7)	Toyota Center; 18,055	18–15
34	December 27	Boston	W 127–113	James Harden (45)	Clint Capela (18)	James Harden (6)	Toyota Center; 18,055	19–15
35	December 29	@ New Orleans	W 108–104	James Harden (41)	James Harden (9)	Austin Rivers (7)	Smoothie King Center; 17,555	20–15
36	December 31	Memphis	W 113–101	James Harden (43)	Clint Capela (13)	James Harden (13)	Toyota Center; 18,055	21–15

January : 8–6 (home: 6–3; road: 2–3)

Game	Date	Team	Score	High points	High rebounds	High assists	Location Attendance	Record
37	January 3	@ Golden State	W 135–134 (OT)	James Harden (44)	Clint Capela (21)	James Harden (15)	Oracle Arena; 19,596	22–15
38	January 5	@ Portland	L 101–110	James Harden (38)	Clint Capela (21)	James Harden (8)	Moda Center; 19,577	22–16
39	January 7	Denver	W 125–113	James Harden (32)	Clint Capela (9)	James Harden (14)	Toyota Center; 18,055	23–16
40	January 9	Milwaukee	L 109–116	James Harden (42)	Clint Capela (13)	P. J. Tucker (7)	Toyota Center; 18,055	23–17
41	January 11	Cleveland	W 141–113	James Harden (43)	James Harden (10)	James Harden (11)	Toyota Center; 18,055	24–17
42	January 13	@ Orlando	L 109–116	James Harden (38)	Clint Capela (10)	James Harden (12)	Amway Center; 16,982	24–18
43	January 14	Memphis	W 112–94	James Harden (57)	James Harden (9)	Austin Rivers (6)	Toyota Center; 18,055	25–18
44	January 16	Brooklyn	L 142–145 (OT)	James Harden (58)	Harden, Tucker (10)	Harden, Rivers (6)	Toyota Center; 18,055	25–19
45	January 19	LA Lakers	W 138–134 (OT)	James Harden (48)	P. J. Tucker (9)	James Harden (6)	Toyota Center; 18,055	26–19
46	January 21	@ Philadelphia	L 93–121	James Harden (37)	Harden, Tucker, Faried (6)	Harden, Rivers (3)	Wells Fargo Center; 20,313	26–20
47	January 23	@ New York	W 114–110	James Harden (61)	James Harden (15)	Harden, Rivers (4)	Madison Square Garden; 18,819	27–20
48	January 25	Toronto	W 121–119	James Harden (35)	Kenneth Faried (14)	James Harden (7)	Toyota Center; 18,055	28–20
49	January 27	Orlando	W 103–98	James Harden (40)	James Harden (11)	Harden, Paul (6)	Toyota Center; 18,055	29–20
50	January 29	New Orleans	L 116–121	James Harden (37)	Harden, Faried (11)	Chris Paul (9)	Toyota Center; 18,055	29–21

February : 8–4 (home: 3–1; road: 5–3)

Game	Date	Team	Score	High points	High rebounds	High assists	Location Attendance	Record
51	February 1	@ Denver	L 122–136	James Harden (30)	Harden, Faried (6)	James Harden (9)	Pepsi Center; 20,106	29–22
52	February 2	@ Utah	W 125–98	James Harden (43)	Harden, Faried (12)	James Harden (5)	Vivint Smart Home Arena; 18,306	30–22
53	February 4	@ Phoenix	W 118–110	James Harden (44)	Kenneth Faried (14)	James Harden (6)	Talking Stick Resort Arena; 15,740	31–22
54	February 6	@ Sacramento	W 127–101	James Harden (36)	Kenneth Faried (11)	Chris Paul (11)	Golden 1 Center; 17,583	32–22
55	February 9	Oklahoma City	L 112–117	James Harden (42)	Kenneth Faried (12)	Chris Paul (9)	Toyota Center; 18,061	32–23
56	February 11	Dallas	W 120–104	James Harden (31)	Harden, Faried (8)	Chris Paul (11)	Toyota Center; 18,055	33–23
57	February 13	@ Minnesota	L 111–121	James Harden (42)	Kenneth Faried (11)	Chris Paul (8)	Target Center; 15,131	33–24
All-Star Break
58	February 21	@ LA Lakers	L 106–111	James Harden (30)	Clint Capela (11)	Chris Paul (9)	Staples Center; 18,997	33–25
59	February 23	@ Golden State	W 118–112	Eric Gordon (25)	Clint Capela (15)	Chris Paul (17)	Oracle Arena; 19,596	34–25
60	February 25	Atlanta	W 119–111	James Harden (28)	Kenneth Faried (10)	Chris Paul (8)	Toyota Center; 18,055	35–25
61	February 27	@ Charlotte	W 118–113	James Harden (30)	Clint Capela (17)	Chris Paul (8)	Spectrum Center; 17,903	36–25
62	February 28	Miami	W 121–118	James Harden (58)	Clint Capela (11)	James Harden (10)	Toyota Center; 18,055	37–25

March : 12–3 (home: 7–1; road: 5–2)

Game	Date	Team	Score	High points	High rebounds	High assists	Location Attendance	Record
63	March 3	@ Boston	W 115–104	James Harden (42)	Clint Capela (9)	Chris Paul (12)	TD Garden; 18,624	38–25
64	March 5	@ Toronto	W 107–95	James Harden (35)	Clint Capela (15)	Chris Paul (10)	Scotiabank Arena; 19,800	39–25
65	March 8	Philadelphia	W 107–91	James Harden (31)	James Harden (10)	Chris Paul (8)	Toyota Center; 18,055	40–25
66	March 10	@ Dallas	W 94–93	James Harden (26)	Clint Capela (12)	Chris Paul (9)	American Airlines Center; 20,423	41–25
67	March 11	Charlotte	W 118–106	James Harden (28)	Clint Capela (15)	James Harden (10)	Toyota Center; 18,055	42–25
68	March 13	Golden State	L 104–106	James Harden (29)	Clint Capela (13)	James Harden (10)	Toyota Center; 18,122	42–26
69	March 15	Phoenix	W 108–102	James Harden (41)	Clint Capela (11)	James Harden (11)	Toyota Center; 18,055	43–26
70	March 17	Minnesota	W 117–102	Chris Paul (25)	Clint Capela (13)	Harden, Paul (10)	Toyota Center; 18,055	44–26
71	March 19	@ Atlanta	W 121–105	James Harden (31)	Clint Capela (11)	Chris Paul (11)	State Farm Arena; 16,293	45–26
72	March 20	@ Memphis	L 125–126 (OT)	James Harden (57)	Clint Capela (10)	James Harden (8)	FedExForum; 16,691	45–27
73	March 22	San Antonio	W 111–105	James Harden (61)	Clint Capela (16)	Chris Paul (5)	Toyota Center; 18,055	46–27
74	March 24	@ New Orleans	W 113–90	James Harden (28)	Clint Capela (17)	Chris Paul (13)	Smoothie King Center; 17,048	47–27
75	March 26	@ Milwaukee	L 94–108	James Harden (23)	Clint Capela (11)	James Harden (7)	Fiserv Forum; 17,910	47–28
76	March 28	Denver	W 112–85	James Harden (38)	Clint Capela (15)	Chris Paul (8)	Toyota Center; 18,055	48–28
77	March 30	Sacramento	W 119–108	James Harden (50)	Clint Capela (15)	James Harden (10)	Toyota Center; 18,055	49–28

April : 4–1 (home: 2–0; road: 2–1)

Game	Date	Team	Score	High points	High rebounds	High assists	Location Attendance	Record
78	April 2	@ Sacramento	W 130–105	James Harden (36)	Clint Capela (13)	Chris Paul (12)	Golden 1 Center; 17,583	50–28
79	April 3	@ LA Clippers	W 135–103	James Harden (31)	Clint Capela (15)	Harden, Paul (7)	Staples Center; 17,593	51–28
80	April 5	New York	W 120–96	James Harden (26)	Clint Capela (15)	Chris Paul (10)	Toyota Center; 18,055	52–28
81	April 7	Phoenix	W 149–113	James Harden (30)	Capela, Harden (13)	Paul, Harden (9)	Toyota Center; 18,055	53–28
82	April 9	@ Oklahoma City	L 111–112	James Harden (39)	Capela, Harden (10)	Chris Paul (6)	Chesapeake Energy Arena; 18,203	53–29

2018–19 season schedule

=== Playoffs ===
2019 playoff game log
Total: 6–5 (home: 5–1; road: 1–4)
First Round: 4–1 (home: 3–0; road: 1–1)

Game	Date	Team	Score	High points	High rebounds	High assists	Location Attendance	Series
1	April 14	Utah	W 122–90	James Harden (29)	Clint Capela (12)	James Harden (10)	Toyota Center; 18,055	1–0
2	April 17	Utah	W 118–98	James Harden (32)	James Harden (13)	James Harden (10)	Toyota Center; 18,055	2–0
3	April 20	@ Utah	W 104–101	James Harden (22)	Clint Capela (14)	James Harden (10)	Vivint Smart Home Arena; 18,306	3–0
4	April 22	@ Utah	L 91–107	James Harden (30)	Chris Paul (8)	Chris Paul (7)	Vivint Smart Home Arena; 18,306	3–1
5	April 24	Utah	W 100–93	James Harden (26)	Clint Capela (10)	James Harden (6)	Toyota Center; 18,055	4–1

Conference Semifinals: 2–4 (home: 2–1; road: 0–3)

Game	Date	Team	Score	High points	High rebounds	High assists	Location Attendance	Series
1	April 28	@ Golden State	L 100–104	James Harden (35)	Clint Capela (6)	James Harden (6)	Oracle Arena; 19,596	0–1
2	April 30	@ Golden State	L 109–115	James Harden (29)	Tucker, Capela (10)	Chris Paul (6)	Oracle Arena; 19,596	0–2
3	May 4	Golden State	W 126–121 (OT)	James Harden (41)	P. J. Tucker (12)	Chris Paul (7)	Toyota Center; 18,169	1–2
4	May 6	Golden State	W 112–108	James Harden (38)	Harden, Tucker (10)	Chris Paul (5)	Toyota Center; 18,169	2–2
5	May 8	@ Golden State	L 99–104	James Harden (31)	Clint Capela (14)	James Harden (8)	Oracle Arena; 19,596	2–3
6	May 10	Golden State	L 113–118	James Harden (35)	Chris Paul (11)	Chris Paul (5)	Toyota Center; 18,055	2–4

2019 playoff schedule

== Player statistics ==
=== Regular season ===
Player	Pos.	GP	GS	MP	Reb.	Ast.	Stl.	Blk.	Pts.
Carmelo Anthony^{†}	PF	10	2	294	54	5	4	7	134
Clint Capela	C	67	67	2,249	848	96	44	102	1,114
Michael Carter-Williams^{†}	PG	16	1	145	13	21	9	6	69
Chris Chiozza^{≠}	PG	7	0	33	4	4	1	1	6
Marquese Chriss^{†}	PF	16	0	104	28	6	2	4	29
Gary Clark	PF	51	2	641	116	18	20	26	148
Vincent Edwards	SF	2	0	16	2	0	0	0	3
James Ennis^{†}	SF	40	25	949	117	27	38	16	294
Kenneth Faried^{≠}	C	25	13	610	206	18	15	19	323
Eric Gordon	SG	68	53	2,158	148	129	41	27	1,103
Gerald Green	SG	73	0	1,473	182	40	33	27	675
James Harden	PG	78	78	2,867	518	586	158	58	2,818
Isaiah Hartenstein	PF	28	0	221	47	15	7	12	53
Danuel House^{‡}	SF	39	13	979	140	40	21	11	366
Terrence Jones^{≠}	PF	2	0	5	4	0	0	0	2
Brandon Knight^{†}	PG	12	0	118	9	9	2	0	36
Nenê	C	42	2	546	123	26	18	15	151
James Nunnally^{≠}	SF	2	0	38	1	2	0	0	9
Chris Paul	PG	58	58	1,857	265	473	114	18	906
Austin Rivers^{≠}	SG	47	13	1,345	91	109	29	13	408
Iman Shumpert^{≠}	SG	20	1	382	54	21	12	4	91
P. J. Tucker	PF	82	82	2,802	479	96	132	39	601
Zhou Qi^{‡}	PF	1	0	1	0	0	0	0	2

After all games.
^{‡}Waived during the season
^{†}Traded during the season
^{≠}Acquired during the season

=== Playoffs ===
Player	Pos.	GP	GS	MP	Reb.	Ast.	Stl.	Blk.	Pts.
Clint Capela	C	11	11	331	113	16	3	12	107
Gary Clark	PF	2	0	4	1	0	0	0	0
Kenneth Faried	C	6	0	56	21	2	2	0	24
Eric Gordon	SG	11	11	410	27	14	7	11	196
Gerald Green	SG	11	0	97	12	1	3	3	39
James Harden	PG	11	11	424	76	73	24	10	348
Isaiah Hartenstein	PF	2	0	2	1	0	0	0	4
Danuel House	SF	7	0	53	14	3	3	2	27
Nenê	C	7	0	141	22	1	3	2	34
Chris Paul	PG	11	11	397	70	60	24	7	187
Austin Rivers	SG	10	0	215	21	10	5	1	74
Iman Shumpert	SG	8	0	109	12	2	1	0	29
P. J. Tucker	PF	11	11	426	82	19	19	8	125

== Transactions ==
=== Trades ===
August 2, 2018	To Houston Rockets Draft rights to Maarty Leunen	To Dallas Mavericks Chinanu Onuaku; Cash considerations Option to swap 2020 second-round draft picks
August 31, 2018	To Houston Rockets Brandon Knight; Marquese Chriss	To Phoenix Suns Ryan Anderson; De'Anthony Melton
January 7, 2019	To Houston Rockets Conditional 2020 second-round draft pick (Memphis)	To Chicago Bulls Michael Carter-Williams; Cash considerations
January 22, 2019	To Houston Rockets Draft rights to Tadija Dragićević	To Chicago Bulls Carmelo Anthony; Draft rights to Jon Diebler; Cash considerations
February 7, 2019	To Houston Rockets Option to swap 2021 second-round draft picks	To Philadelphia 76ers James Ennis III
February 7, 2019	To Houston Rockets Iman Shumpert (from Sacramento); Wade Baldwin IV; Nik Stauskas; 2021 second-round draft pick (Milwaukee); Option to swap 2020 second-round draft picks	To Cleveland Cavaliers Brandon Knight; Marquese Chriss; Conditional 2019 first-round draft pick 2022 second-round draft pick
February 7, 2019	To Houston Rockets Cash considerations	To Indiana Pacers Wade Baldwin IV; Nik Stauskas; Draft rights to Maarty Leunen; 2021 second-round draft pick (Milwaukee)

=== Free agency ===
==== Re-signed ====
Player	Signed
Chris Paul	4-year contract worth $160 million
Gerald Green	1-year contract worth $2.4 million
Clint Capela	5-year contract worth $90 million

==== Additions ====
Player	Signed	Former team
Gary Clark	Two-way contract	Cincinnati Bearcats
Vincent Edwards	Two-way contract	Purdue Boilermakers
Michael Carter-Williams	1-year contract worth $1.9 million	Charlotte Hornets
James Ennis III	2-year contract worth $3.4 million	Detroit Pistons
Carmelo Anthony	1-year contract worth $2.4 million	Oklahoma City Thunder
Danuel House	Two-way contract	Rio Grande Valley Vipers
Austin Rivers	1-year, veteran's minimum contract	Phoenix Suns
James Nunnally	10-day contract	Minnesota Timberwolves
Kenneth Faried	1-year, veteran's prorated minimum contract	Brooklyn Nets
Terrence Jones	10-day contract	Erie BayHawks
Chris Chiozza	10-day contract	Capital City Go-Go
Trevon Duval	Two-way contract	Milwaukee Bucks
Michael Frazier II	Prorated minimum contract	Rio Grande Valley Vipers

==== Subtractions ====
Player	Reason left	New team
Trevor Ariza	1-year contract worth $15 million	Phoenix Suns
Aaron Jackson	Waived	(China) Beijing Ducks
Luc Mbah a Moute	1-year contract worth $4.3 million	Los Angeles Clippers
Markel Brown	1-year contract	(Turkey) Darüşşafaka
R. J. Hunter	Waived	Atlanta Hawks
Zhou Qi	Waived	n/a
James Nunnally	Waived	(Italy) AX Armani Exchange Olimpia Milan
Terrence Jones	Waived	n/a

== Awards ==
Player	Award	Date awarded	Ref.
James Harden	Western Conference Player of the Week	December 17, 2018	
James Harden	Western Conference Player of the Week	December 31, 2018	
Mike D'Antoni	Western Conference Coach of the Month (December)	January 2, 2019	
James Harden	Western Conference Player of the Month (December)	January 3, 2019	
James Harden	Western Conference Player of the Week	January 21, 2019	
James Harden	NBA All-Star	January 24, 2019	
James Harden	Western Conference Player of the Month (January)	February 2, 2019	
James Harden	Western Conference Player of the Week	March 25, 2019	
James Harden	Western Conference Player of the Month (March/April)	April 11, 2019	
