= 2018–19 Miami Heat season =

NBA professional basketball team season

- Head coach: Erik Spoelstra
- President: Pat Riley
- General manager: Andy Elisburg
- Owner: Micky Arison
- Arena: American Airlines Arena

Results
- Record: 39–43 (.476)
- Place: Division: 3rd (Southeast); Conference: 10th (Eastern)
- Playoff finish: Did not qualify
- Stats at Basketball Reference

Local media
- Television: Fox Sports Sun
- Radio: 790 AM, "The Ticket"

The 2018–19 Miami Heat season was the 31st season of the franchise in the National Basketball Association (NBA).

This was Dwyane Wade's final season, after playing 16 years in the NBA. Believed by many to be the best player in franchise history, Wade led the team to its first championship title in 2006, as well as back-to-back titles in 2012 and 2013. He also led the team to a total of 11 playoff appearances, and Finals appearances in 2011 and 2014 and won the scoring title in 2009. Including his honorary All-Star spot this season, Wade has 13 total NBA All-Star Game appearances to his name, including an All-Star MVP Award in 2010.

On March 26, 2019, the Heat retired Chris Bosh's jersey prior to their game versus the Orlando Magic. A free agent since 2017, Bosh officially announced his retirement on February 12, 2019, due to an ongoing battle with blood clots that ended his playing career in 2016.

The Heat were eliminated from playoff contention for the third time in five years on April 9, when the Detroit Pistons defeated the Memphis Grizzlies. Until the 2026 season, this was the last time that the Heat missed the playoffs.

== Draft picks ==
The Heat did not have a pick in the 2018 NBA draft, with their selections having been traded to the Phoenix Suns and Memphis Grizzlies (later Houston Rockets), respectively.

== Roster ==
2018–19 Miami Heat roster
Players

Pos.	No.	Player	Height	Weight	DOB	From
F/C	13	Bam Adebayo	6 ft 10 in (2.08 m)	255 lb (116 kg)	1997–07–18	Kentucky
F	31	Ryan Anderson	6 ft 10 in (2.08 m)	240 lb (109 kg)	1988–05–06	California
G	7	Goran Dragić	6 ft 3 in (1.91 m)	190 lb (86 kg)	1986–05–06	Slovenia
F	40	Udonis Haslem	6 ft 8 in (2.03 m)	235 lb (107 kg)	1980–06–09	Florida
F	16	James Johnson	6 ft 8 in (2.03 m)	240 lb (109 kg)	1987–02–20	Wake Forest
G/F	5	Derrick Jones	6 ft 7 in (2.01 m)	200 lb (91 kg)	1997–02–15	UNLV
F	00	Yante Maten	6 ft 8 in (2.03 m)	240 lb (109 kg)	1996–08–14	Georgia
F	9	Kelly Olynyk	7 ft 0 in (2.13 m)	240 lb (109 kg)	1991–04–19	Gonzaga
G/F	0	Josh Richardson	6 ft 6 in (1.98 m)	200 lb (91 kg)	1993–09–15	Tennessee
F	55	Duncan Robinson	6 ft 8 in (2.03 m)	210 lb (95 kg)	1994–04–22	Michigan
G	3	Dwyane Wade	6 ft 4 in (1.93 m)	220 lb (100 kg)	1982-01-17	Marquette
G	11	Dion Waiters	6 ft 4 in (1.93 m)	215 lb (98 kg)	1991–12–10	Syracuse
C	21	Hassan Whiteside	7 ft 0 in (2.13 m)	265 lb (120 kg)	1989–06–13	Marshall
F	20	Justise Winslow	6 ft 7 in (2.01 m)	225 lb (102 kg)	1996–03–26	Duke

Coaches
Head coach
- Erik Spoelstra
Assistant(s)
- Dan Craig
- Juwan Howard
- Octavio De La Grana (Player Development)
- Chris Quinn (Player Development)

Legend
- (DP) Unsigned draft pick
- (FA) Free agent
- (S) Suspended
- (GL) On assignment to G League affiliate
- (TW) Two-way affiliate player
- Injured

Roster
Updated: 2019–04–10

== Standings ==
=== Division ===
Southeast Division	W	L	PCT	GB	Home	Road	Div	GP
y – Orlando Magic	42	40	.512	–	25‍–‍16	17‍–‍24	10–6	82
Charlotte Hornets	39	43	.476	3.0	25‍–‍16	14‍–‍27	10–6	82
Miami Heat	39	43	.476	3.0	19‍–‍22	20‍–‍21	7–9	82
Washington Wizards	32	50	.390	10.0	22‍–‍19	10‍–‍31	7–9	82
Atlanta Hawks	29	53	.354	13.0	17‍–‍24	12‍–‍29	6–10	82

=== Conference ===
Eastern Conference
#	Team	W	L	PCT	GB	GP
1	z – Milwaukee Bucks *	60	22	.732	–	82
2	y – Toronto Raptors *	58	24	.707	2.0	82
3	x – Philadelphia 76ers	51	31	.622	9.0	82
4	x – Boston Celtics	49	33	.598	11.0	82
5	x – Indiana Pacers	48	34	.585	12.0	82
6	x – Brooklyn Nets	42	40	.512	18.0	82
7	y – Orlando Magic *	42	40	.512	18.0	82
8	x – Detroit Pistons	41	41	.500	19.0	82
9	Charlotte Hornets	39	43	.476	21.0	82
10	Miami Heat	39	43	.476	21.0	82
11	Washington Wizards	32	50	.390	28.0	82
12	Atlanta Hawks	29	53	.354	31.0	82
13	Chicago Bulls	22	60	.268	38.0	82
14	Cleveland Cavaliers	19	63	.232	41.0	82
15	New York Knicks	17	65	.207	43.0	82

== Game log ==
=== Preseason ===
2018 preseason game log
Total: 3–3 (Home: 3–0; Road: 0–3)
Preseason: 3–3 (home: 3–0; road: 0–3)

Game	Date	Team	Score	High points	High rebounds	High assists	Location Attendance	Record
1	September 30	@ San Antonio	L 100–104	Hassan Whiteside (20)	Hassan Whiteside (13)	Olynyk, Wade (4)	AT&T Center; 17,024	0–1
2	October 2	@ Charlotte	L 113–122	Kelly Olynyk (18)	Hassan Whiteside (15)	Goran Dragic (4)	Spectrum Center; 8,417	0–2
3	October 5	@ Washington	L 114–121	Maten, Winslow (17)	Hassan Whiteside (9)	Briante Weber (6)	Capital One Arena; 12,825	0–3
4	October 8	Orlando	W 90–89	Rodney McGruder (19)	Hassan Whiteside (13)	Dragic, McGruder, Johnson (5)	American Airlines Arena; 19,600	1–3
5	October 10	New Orleans	W 140–128	Bam Adebayo (26)	Bam Adebayo (12)	Tyler Johnson (7)	American Airlines Arena; 19,600	2–3
6	October 12	Atlanta	W 119–113	Josh Richardson (24)	Dwyane Wade (5)	Wade, Dragic (5)	American Airlines Arena; 19,600	3–3

2018–19 season schedule

=== Regular season ===
2018–19 game log
Total: 39–43 (Home: 19–22; Road: 20–21)
October: 3–4 (home: 2–2; road: 1–2)

Game	Date	Team	Score	High points	High rebounds	High assists	Location Attendance	Record
1	October 17	@ Orlando	101–104	Goran Dragic (26)	Hassan Whiteside (18)	Goran Dragic (4)	Amway Center; 19,191	0–1
2	October 18	@ Washington	113–112	Josh Richardson (28)	Hassan Whiteside (10)	Goran Dragic (8)	Capital One Arena; 20,409	1–1
3	October 20	Charlotte	112–113	Dwyane Wade (21)	Hassan Whiteside (15)	Goran Dragic (7)	American Airlines Arena; 19,600	1–2
4	October 24	New York	110–87	Hassan Whiteside (22)	Hassan Whiteside (14)	Kelly Olynyk (6)	American Airlines Arena; 19,600	2–2
5	October 27	Portland	120–111	Goran Dragic (28)	Hassan Whiteside (15)	Dragic, Richardson (5)	American Airlines Arena; 19,600	3–2
6	October 29	Sacramento	113–123	Josh Richardson (31)	Hassan Whiteside (24)	Goran Dragic (5)	American Airlines Arena; 19,600	3–3
7	October 30	@ Charlotte	113–125	Dwyane Wade (19)	Hassan Whiteside (12)	Justise Winslow (5)	Spectrum Center; 14,117	3–4

November : 5–9 (home: 2–6; road: 3–3)

Game	Date	Team	Score	High points	High rebounds	High assists	Location Attendance	Record
8	November 3	@ Atlanta	118–123	Josh Richardson (32)	Justise Winslow (10)	Justise Winslow (8)	State Farm Arena; 16,303	3–5
9	November 5	@ Detroit	120–115 (OT)	Josh Richardson (27)	Richardson, Adebayo (8)	Goran Dragic (6)	Little Caesars Arena; 1,4148	4–5
10	November 7	San Antonio	95–88	Hassan Whiteside (29)	Hassan Whiteside (20)	Josh Richardson (5)	American Airlines Arena; 19,600	5–5
11	November 9	Indiana	102–110	Kelly Olynyk (20)	Hassan Whiteside (20)	Josh Richardson (6)	American Airlines Arena; 19,600	5–6
12	November 10	Washington	110–116	Josh Richardson (24)	Hassan Whiteside (14)	Josh Richardson (5)	American Airlines Arena; 19,600	5–7
13	November 12	Philadelphia	114–124	Goran Dragic (22)	Hassan Whiteside (11)	Goran Dragic (5)	American Airlines Arena; 19,600	5–8
14	November 14	@ Brooklyn	120–107	Tyler Johnson (24)	Justise Winslow (11)	Goran Dragic (5)	Barclays Center; 13,317	6–8
15	November 16	@ Indiana	91–99	Josh Richardson (28)	Hassan Whiteside (17)	Justise Winslow (6)	Bankers Life Fieldhouse; 17,923	6–9
16	November 18	LA Lakers	97–113	Wayne Ellington (19)	Bam Adebayo (8)	Rodney McGruder (4)	American Airlines Arena; 19,686	6–10
17	November 20	Brooklyn	92–104	Hassan Whiteside (21)	Hassan Whiteside (23)	Josh Richardson (5)	American Airlines Arena; 19,600	6–11
18	November 23	@ Chicago	103–96	Josh Richardson (27)	Bam Adebayo (13)	Wayne Ellington (4)	United Center; 20,935	7–11
19	November 25	@ Toronto	115–125	Dwyane Wade (35)	Bam Adebayo (21)	Dwyane Wade (6)	Scotiabank Arena; 19,800	7–12
20	November 27	Atlanta	113–115	Josh Richardson (22)	Hassan Whiteside (10)	Rodney McGruder (5)	American Airlines Arena; 19,600	7–13
21	November 30	New Orleans	106–101	Josh Richardson (20)	Bam Adebayo (11)	Dwyane Wade (6)	American Airlines Arena; 19,600	8–13

December : 9–5 (home: 4–3; road: 5–2)

Game	Date	Team	Score	High points	High rebounds	High assists	Location Attendance	Record
22	December 2	Utah	102–100	Hassan Whiteside (23)	Hassan Whiteside (20)	Dwyane Wade (8)	American Airlines Arena; 19,600	9–13
23	December 4	Orlando	90–105	Justise Winslow (14)	Hassan Whiteside (9)	Josh Richardson (5)	American Airlines Arena; 19,600	9–14
24	December 7	@ Phoenix	115–98	Bam Adebayo (22)	Bam Adebayo (10)	Goran Dragic (10)	Talking Stick Resort Arena; 14,273	10–14
25	December 8	@ LA Clippers	121–98	Dwyane Wade (25)	Derrick Jones Jr. (11)	Justise Winslow (9)	Staples Center; 17,113	11–14
26	December 10	@ LA Lakers	105–108	Justise Winslow (28)	Derrick Jones Jr. (14)	Dwyane Wade (10)	Staples Center; 18,997	11–15
27	December 12	@ Utah	84–111	Rodney McGruder (16)	Kelly Olynyk (8)	Olynyk, Adebayo (3)	Vivint Smart Home Arena; 18,306	11–16
28	December 14	@ Memphis	100–97	Olynyk, Richardson (18)	Bam Adebayo (9)	Josh Richardson (7)	FedExForum; 16,313	12–16
29	December 16	@ New Orleans	102–96	Josh Richardson (22)	Hassan Whiteside (12)	Bam Adebayo (5)	Smoothie King Center; 15,535	13–16
30	December 20	Houston	101–99	Josh Richardson (22)	Hassan Whiteside (17)	Josh Richardson (7)	American Airlines Arena; 19,600	14–16
31	December 22	Milwaukee	94–87	Josh Richardson (16)	Hassan Whiteside (13)	Justise Winslow (5)	American Airlines Arena; 19,600	15–16
32	December 23	@ Orlando	115–91	Tyler Johnson (25)	Josh Richardson (10)	Johnson, Winslow, Adebayo (5)	Amway Center; 18,846	16–16
33	December 26	Toronto	104–106	Justise Winslow (21)	Hassan Whiteside (12)	Josh Richardson (7)	American Airlines Arena; 19,902	16–17
34	December 28	Cleveland	118–94	Justise Winslow (24)	Justise Winslow (11)	Justise Winslow (7)	American Airlines Arena; 19,617	17–17
35	December 30	Minnesota	104–113	Dwyane Wade (21)	Hassan Whiteside (13)	Dwyane Wade (5)	American Airlines Arena; 19,600	17–18

January : 7–7 (home: 3–3; road: 4–4)

Game	Date	Team	Score	High points	High rebounds	High assists	Location Attendance	Record
36	January 2	@ Cleveland	117–92	Josh Richardson (24)	Hassan Whiteside (12)	Richardson, Adebayo (5)	Quicken Loans Arena; 19,432	18–18
37	January 4	Washington	115–109	Hassan Whiteside (21)	Hassan Whiteside (18)	Justise Winslow (10)	American Airlines Arena; 19,600	19–18
38	January 6	@ Atlanta	82–106	Derrick Jones Jr. (14)	Adebayo, Olynyk (6)	Rodney McGruder (5)	State Farm Arena; 16,630	19–19
39	January 8	Denver	99–103	Dion Waiters (15)	Hassan Whiteside (11)	Dwyane Wade (6)	American Airlines Arena; 19,600	19–20
40	January 10	Boston	115–99	Dwyane Wade (19)	Hassan Whiteside (10)	Justise Winslow (11)	American Airlines Arena; 19,600	20–20
41	January 12	Memphis	112–108	Justise Winslow (26)	Bam Adebayo (10)	Josh Richardson (9)	American Airlines Arena; 19,600	21–20
42	January 15	@ Milwaukee	86–124	Winslow, Whiteside (19)	Hassan Whiteside (8)	Josh Richardson (5)	Fiserv Forum; 17,626	21–21
43	January 18	@ Detroit	93–98	Dwyane Wade (20)	Hassan Whiteside (10)	Dwyane Wade (8)	Little Caesars Arena; 17,228	21–22
44	January 19	@ Chicago	117–103	Josh Richardson (26)	Wade, Whiteside (10)	Dwyane Wade (7)	United Center; 20,926	22–22
45	January 21	@ Boston	99–107	Waiters, Jones Jr. (18)	Derrick Jones Jr. (9)	Justise Winslow (6)	TD Garden; 18,624	22–23
46	January 23	LA Clippers	99–111	Hassan Whiteside (22)	Hassan Whiteside (16)	Johnson, Richardson (6)	American Airlines Arena; 19,600	22–24
47	January 25	@ Cleveland	100–94	Justise Winslow (27)	Hassan Whiteside (13)	Tyler Johnson (6)	Quicken Loans Arena; 19,432	23–24
48	January 27	@ N. Y. Knicks	106–97	Wayne Ellington (19)	Hassan Whiteside (16)	Dwyane Wade (10)	Madison Square Garden; 18,852	24–24
49	January 30	Chicago	89–105	Tyler Johnson (15)	Olynyk, Whiteside (9)	Waiters, Winslow (5)	American Airlines Arena; 19,600	24–25

February : 3–9 (home: 1–4; road: 2–5)

Game	Date	Team	Score	High points	High rebounds	High assists	Location Attendance	Record
50	February 1	Oklahoma City	102–118	Kelly Olynyk (21)	Hassan Whiteside (6)	Dwyane Wade (6)	American Airlines Arena; 19,600	24–26
51	February 2	Indiana	88–95	Dwyane Wade (21)	Hassan Whiteside (14)	Dwyane Wade (6)	American Airlines Arena; 19,600	24–27
52	February 5	@ Portland	118–108	Hassan Whiteside (28)	Hassan Whiteside (11)	Justise Winslow (5)	Moda Center; 19,468	25–27
53	February 8	@ Sacramento	96–102	Josh Richardson (21)	Hassan Whiteside (19)	Justise Winslow (6)	Golden 1 Center; 17,583	25–28
54	February 10	@ Golden State	118–120	Josh Richardson (37)	Hassan Whiteside (14)	Dwyane Wade (9)	Oracle Arena; 19,596	25–29
55	February 11	@ Denver	87–103	Justise Winslow (15)	Rodney McGruder (10)	Josh Richardson (8)	Pepsi Center; 18,378	25–30
56	February 13	@ Dallas	112–101	Dwyane Wade (22)	Justise Winslow (11)	Richardson, Winslow (6)	American Airlines Center; 20,364	26–30
57	February 21	@ Philadelphia	102–106	Dwyane Wade (19)	Justise Winslow (7)	Justise Winslow (6)	Wells Fargo Center; 20,505	26–31
58	February 23	Detroit	96–119	Dion Waiters (17)	Hassan Whiteside (15)	Dion Waiters (5)	American Airlines Arena; 19,600	26–32
59	February 25	Phoenix	121–124	Hassan Whiteside (29)	Hassan Whiteside (11)	Josh Richardson (9)	American Airlines Arena; 19,600	26–33
60	February 27	Golden State	126–125	Goran Dragić (27)	Bam Adebayo (10)	Josh Richardson (5)	American Airlines Arena; 19,647	27–33
61	February 28	@ Houston	118–121	Olynyk, Dragić (21)	Justise Winslow (7)	Justise Winslow (8)	Toyota Center; 18,055	27–34

March : 11–4 (home: 6–3; road: 5–1)

Game	Date	Team	Score	High points	High rebounds	High assists	Location Attendance	Record
62	March 2	Brooklyn	117–88	Kelly Olynyk (25)	Bam Adebayo (16)	Waiters, Richardson (7)	American Airlines Arena; 19,600	28–34
63	March 4	Atlanta	114–113	Dwyane Wade (23)	Hassan Whiteside (7)	Wade, Richardson (5)	American Airlines Arena; 19,600	29–34
64	March 6	@ Charlotte	91–84	Kelly Olynyk (22)	Kelly Olynyk (11)	Justise Winslow (7)	Spectrum Center; 18,137	30–34
65	March 8	Cleveland	126–110	Josh Richardson (20)	Hassan Whiteside (11)	Justise Winslow (9)	American Airlines Arena; 19,600	31–34
66	March 10	Toronto	104–125	Bam Adebayo (19)	Hassan Whiteside (7)	Bam Adebayo (5)	American Airlines Arena; 19,600	31–35
67	March 13	Detroit	108–74	Justise Winslow (16)	Hassan Whiteside (11)	Josh Richardson (5)	American Airlines Arena; 19,600	32–35
68	March 15	Milwaukee	98–113	Justise Winslow (20)	Bam Adebayo (11)	Justise Winslow (5)	American Airlines Arena; 19,600	32–36
69	March 17	Charlotte	93–75	Goran Dragić (19)	Kelly Olynyk (9)	Kelly Olynyk (6)	American Airlines Arena; 19,600	33–36
70	March 18	@ Oklahoma City	116–107	Goran Dragić (26)	Kelly Olynyk (9)	Goran Dragić (11)	Chesapeake Energy Arena; 18,203	34–36
71	March 20	@ San Antonio	110–105	Goran Dragić (22)	Bam Adebayo (15)	Bam Adebayo (5)	AT&T Center; 18,354	35–36
72	March 22	@ Milwaukee	87–116	Hassan Whiteside (14)	Hassan Whiteside (9)	Josh Richardson (5)	Fiserv Forum; 18,094	35–37
73	March 23	@ Washington	113–108	Dwyane Wade (20)	Bam Adebayo (11)	Bam Adebayo (8)	Capital One Arena; 20,409	36–37
74	March 26	Orlando	99–104	Dion Waiters (26)	Bam Adebayo (11)	Dwyane Wade (7)	American Airlines Arena; 19,704	36–38
75	March 28	Dallas	105–99	Goran Dragić (23)	Bam Adebayo (16)	Goran Dragić (11)	American Airlines Arena; 19,851	37–38
76	March 30	@ N. Y. Knicks	100–92	Dion Waiters (28)	Hassan Whiteside (13)	Goran Dragić (10)	Madison Square Garden; 19,812	38–38

April : 1–5 (home: 1–1; road: 0–4)

Game	Date	Team	Score	High points	High rebounds	High assists	Location Attendance	Record
77	April 1	@ Boston	105–110	Goran Dragić (30)	Bam Adebayo (14)	Dwyane Wade (7)	TD Garden; 18,624	38–39
78	April 3	Boston	102–112	Dion Waiters (21)	Hassan Whiteside (15)	Dwyane Wade (6)	American Airlines Arena; 19,904	38–40
79	April 5	@ Minnesota	109–111	Dwyane Wade (24)	Whiteside, Dragić, Winslow (7)	Goran Dragić (9)	Target Center; 17,763	38–41
80	April 7	@ Toronto	109–117 (OT)	Dwyane Wade (21)	Bam Adebayo (13)	Dragić, Winslow (6)	Scotiabank Arena; 19,800	38–42
81	April 9	Philadelphia	122–99	Dwyane Wade (30)	Whiteside, Adebayo (9)	Goran Dragić (13)	American Airlines Arena; 20,153	39–42
82	April 10	@ Brooklyn	94–113	Dwyane Wade (25)	Wade, Haslem (11)	Dwyane Wade (10)	Barclays Center; 17,732	39–43

2018–19 season schedule

== Player statistics ==
=== Ragular season ===
Player	POS	GP	GS	MP	REB	AST	STL	BLK	PTS	MPG	RPG	APG	SPG	BPG	PPG
Bam Adebayo	C	82	28	1,913	597	184	71	65	729	23.3	7.3	2.2	.9	.8	8.9
Kelly Olynyk	PF	79	36	1,812	375	140	53	37	787	22.9	4.7	1.8	.7	.5	10.0
Josh Richardson	SG	73	73	2,539	263	298	79	34	1,209	34.8	3.6	4.1	1.1	.5	16.6
Hassan Whiteside	C	72	53	1,674	817	56	46	136	887	23.3	11.3	.8	.6	1.9	12.3
Dwyane Wade	SG	72	2	1,885	285	301	59	38	1,083	26.2	4.0	4.2	.8	.5	15.0
Justise Winslow	SF	66	52	1,959	355	282	72	19	830	29.7	5.4	4.3	1.1	.3	12.6
Rodney McGruder	SG	66	45	1,550	238	112	36	12	503	23.5	3.6	1.7	.5	.2	7.6
Derrick Jones Jr.	SF	60	14	1,153	240	37	46	42	422	19.2	4.0	.6	.8	.7	7.0
James Johnson	PF	55	33	1,164	176	135	35	27	428	21.2	3.2	2.5	.6	.5	7.8
Dion Waiters	SG	44	28	1,138	116	121	29	9	527	25.9	2.6	2.8	.7	.2	12.0
Tyler Johnson^{†}	PG	44	10	1,123	121	112	40	21	475	25.5	2.8	2.5	.9	.5	10.8
Goran Dragić	PG	36	22	991	111	174	30	5	494	27.5	3.1	4.8	.8	.1	13.7
Wayne Ellington^{†}	SG	25	12	533	47	29	24	3	209	21.3	1.9	1.2	1.0	.1	8.4
Duncan Robinson	SF	15	1	161	19	5	5	0	50	10.7	1.3	.3	.3	.0	3.3
Udonis Haslem	C	10	1	74	27	2	0	0	25	7.4	2.7	.2	.0	.0	2.5
Ryan Anderson^{†}	PF	10	0	44	9	2	1	0	7	4.4	.9	.2	.1	.0	.7
Yante Maten	PF	2	0	13	3	0	1	0	2	6.5	1.5	.0	.5	.0	1.0
Emanuel Terry^{†}	PF	1	0	3	1	1	0	0	1	3.0	1.0	1.0	.0	.0	1.0

- ^{†} Denotes player spent time with another team in the season. Stats reflect time with the Heat only.

== Transactions ==
=== Free agents ===
==== Re-signed ====
Player	Signed
Derrick Jones Jr.	July 1, 2018
Wayne Ellington	July 13, 2018
Dwyane Wade	September 18, 2018

==== Additions ====
Player	Signed	Contract	Former Team	Ref.
Duncan Robinson	July 10, 2018	Two-way contract	Michigan Wolverines	
Yante Maten	July 29, 2018	Two-way contract	Georgia Bulldogs	
Malik Newman	August 6, 2018		Los Angeles Lakers	
Marcus Lee	August 15, 2018		California Golden Bears	
Brianté Weber	August 21, 2018		Memphis Grizzlies	
Jarnell Stokes	August 27, 2018		(China) Zhejiang Golden Bulls	

==== Subtractions ====
Player	Reason Left	New Team	Ref.
Jordan Mickey	Option declined	(Russia) Khimki	
Derrick Walton	Unrestricted free agent	Chicago Bulls	
