= 2018–19 Utah Jazz season =

NBA professional basketball team season

- Head coach: Quin Snyder
- General manager: Dennis Lindsey
- Arena: Vivint Arena

Results
- Record: 50–32 (.610)
- Place: Division: 3rd (Northwest); Conference: 5th (Western)
- Playoff finish: First round (lost to Rockets 1–4)
- Stats at Basketball Reference

Local media
- Television: AT&T SportsNet Rocky Mountain
- Radio: 1280; 97.5 The Zone

The 2018–19 Utah Jazz season was the 45th season of the franchise in the National Basketball Association (NBA), and the 40th season of the franchise in Salt Lake City. On March 28, the Jazz qualified the playoffs for the third straight season. The Jazz had the second best team defensive rating in the NBA.

In the 2019 playoffs, the Jazz lost to the Houston Rockets in the first round in five games.

== Draft picks ==
Round	Pick	Player	Position	Nationality	College
1	21	Grayson Allen	SG	United States	Duke

== Roster ==
2018–19 Utah Jazz roster
Players

Pos.	No.	Player	Height	Weight	DOB	From
G	24	Grayson Allen	6 ft 5 in (1.96 m)	198 lb (90 kg)	1995–10–08	Duke
C	13	Tony Bradley	6 ft 10 in (2.08 m)	248 lb (112 kg)	1998–01–08	North Carolina
F	34	Tyler Cavanaugh (TW)	6 ft 9 in (2.06 m)	238 lb (108 kg)	1994–02–09	George Washington
F	99	Jae Crowder	6 ft 6 in (1.98 m)	235 lb (107 kg)	1990–07–06	Marquette
G	11	Dante Exum (injured)	6 ft 6 in (1.98 m)	190 lb (86 kg)	1995–07–13	Australia
F/C	15	Derrick Favors	6 ft 10 in (2.08 m)	265 lb (120 kg)	1991–07–15	Georgia Tech
C	27	Rudy Gobert	7 ft 1 in (2.16 m)	245 lb (111 kg)	1992–06–26	France
F	2	Joe Ingles	6 ft 8 in (2.03 m)	226 lb (103 kg)	1987–10–02	Australia
G/F	26	Kyle Korver	6 ft 7 in (2.01 m)	212 lb (96 kg)	1981–03–17	Creighton
G	45	Donovan Mitchell	6 ft 3 in (1.91 m)	215 lb (98 kg)	1996–09–07	Louisville
G	30	Naz Mitrou-Long (TW)	6 ft 4 in (1.93 m)	218 lb (99 kg)	1993–08–03	Iowa State
G	25	Raul Neto	6 ft 1 in (1.85 m)	179 lb (81 kg)	1992–05–19	Brazil
F	31	Georges Niang	6 ft 6 in (1.98 m)	230 lb (104 kg)	1993–06–17	Iowa State
F	23	Royce O'Neale	6 ft 6 in (1.98 m)	226 lb (103 kg)	1993–06–05	Baylor
G	3	Ricky Rubio	6 ft 4 in (1.93 m)	190 lb (86 kg)	1990–10–21	Spain
F	22	Thabo Sefolosha	6 ft 7 in (2.01 m)	220 lb (100 kg)	1984–05–02	Switzerland
F/C	33	Ekpe Udoh	6 ft 10 in (2.08 m)	245 lb (111 kg)	1987–05–20	Baylor

Coaches
Head coach
- Quin Snyder
Assistant(s)
- Johnnie Bryant
- Alex Jensen
- Zach Guthrie
- Fotios Katsikaris
- Antonio Lang
- Mike Wells
- Mark McKown (player development)
- Jeff Watkinson (player development)

Legend
- (DP) Unsigned draft pick
- (FA) Free agent
- (S) Suspended
- (GL) On assignment to G League affiliate
- (TW) Two-way affiliate player
- Injured

Roster
Updated: 2018–12–18

== Standings ==
=== Division ===
Northwest Division	W	L	PCT	GB	Home	Road	Div	GP
y – Denver Nuggets	54	28	.659	–	34‍–‍7	20‍–‍21	12–4	82
x – Portland Trail Blazers	53	29	.646	1.0	32‍–‍9	21‍–‍20	6–10	82
x – Utah Jazz	50	32	.610	4.0	29‍–‍12	21‍–‍20	8–8	82
x – Oklahoma City Thunder	49	33	.598	5.0	27‍–‍14	22‍–‍19	9–7	82
Minnesota Timberwolves	36	46	.439	18.0	25‍–‍16	11‍–‍30	5–11	82

=== Conference standings ===
Western Conference
#	Team	W	L	PCT	GB	GP
1	c – Golden State Warriors *	57	25	.695	–	82
2	y – Denver Nuggets *	54	28	.659	3.0	82
3	x – Portland Trail Blazers	53	29	.646	4.0	82
4	y – Houston Rockets *	53	29	.646	4.0	82
5	x – Utah Jazz	50	32	.610	7.0	82
6	x – Oklahoma City Thunder	49	33	.598	8.0	82
7	x – San Antonio Spurs	48	34	.585	9.0	82
8	x – Los Angeles Clippers	48	34	.585	9.0	82
9	Sacramento Kings	39	43	.476	18.0	82
10	Los Angeles Lakers	37	45	.451	20.0	82
11	Minnesota Timberwolves	36	46	.439	21.0	82
12	Memphis Grizzlies	33	49	.402	24.0	82
13	New Orleans Pelicans	33	49	.402	24.0	82
14	Dallas Mavericks	33	49	.402	24.0	82
15	Phoenix Suns	19	63	.232	38.0	82

== Game log ==
=== Preseason ===
2018 preseason game log
Total: 5–0 (home: 3-0; road: 2–0)
Preseason: 5–0 (home: 3–0; road: 2–0)

Game	Date	Team	Score	High points	High rebounds	High assists	Location Attendance	Record
1	September 29	Perth	W 130–72	Allen (19)	Bradley (8)	Allen (6)	Vivint Smart Home Arena; 17,685	1–0
2	October 2	Toronto	W 105–90	Ingles (24)	Gobert (10)	O'Neale, Crowder, Ingles, Burks (4)	Vivint Smart Home Arena; 18,306	2–0
3	October 5	Adelaide	W 129–99	Mitchell (18)	Udoh (10)	Ingles (7)	Vivint Smart Home Arena; 18,074	3–0
4	October 7	@ Portland	W 123–112	Mitchell (21)	Ingles (7)	Ingles (5)	Moda Center; 19,441	4–0
5	October 11	@ Sacramento	W 132–93	Gobert (18)	Favors (12)	Rubio (6)	Golden 1 Center; N/A	5–0

2018–19 season schedule

=== Regular season ===
2018–19 game log
Total: 50–32 (home: 29–12; road: 21–20)
October: 4–3 (home: 0–2; road: 4–1)

Game	Date	Team	Score	High points	High rebounds	High assists	Location Attendance	Record
1	October 17	@ Sacramento	W 123–117	Donovan Mitchell (24)	Rudy Gobert (15)	Joe Ingles (6)	Golden 1 Center; 17,583	1–0
2	October 19	Golden State	L 123–124	Joe Ingles (27)	Rudy Gobert (11)	Ricky Rubio (10)	Vivint Smart Home Arena; 18,306	1–1
3	October 22	Memphis	L 84–92	Donovan Mitchell (14)	Rudy Gobert (12)	Rubio, Ingles (4)	Vivint Smart Home Arena; 18,306	1–2
4	October 24	@ Houston	W 100–89	Donovan Mitchell (38)	Rudy Gobert (13)	Donovan Mitchell (7)	Toyota Center; 18,055	2–2
5	October 27	@ New Orleans	W 132–111	Ricky Rubio (28)	Rudy Gobert (14)	Ricky Rubio (12)	Smoothie King Center; 16,373	3–2
6	October 28	@ Dallas	W 113–104	Rudy Gobert (23)	Rudy Gobert (16)	Ricky Rubio (8)	American Airlines Center; 19,571	4–2
7	October 31	@ Minnesota	L 125–128	Donovan Mitchell (26)	Rudy Gobert (13)	Rubio, Mitchell (5)	Target Center; 10,079	4–3

November : 7–9 (home: 2–4; road: 5–5)

Game	Date	Team	Score	High points	High rebounds	High assists	Location Attendance	Record
8	November 2	Memphis	L 100–110	Ricky Rubio (22)	Rudy Gobert (16)	Ricky Rubio (11)	Vivint Smart Home Arena; 18,306	4–4
9	November 3	@ Denver	L 88–103	Jae Crowder (21)	Rudy Gobert (12)	Rubio, Ingles (6)	Pepsi Center; 19,520	4–5
10	November 5	Toronto	L 111–124	Alec Burks (22)	Rudy Gobert (12)	Ricky Rubio (9)	Vivint Smart Home Arena; 18,306	4–6
11	November 7	Dallas	W 117–102	Donovan Mitchell (23)	Rudy Gobert (10)	Ricky Rubio (12)	Vivint Smart Home Arena; 18,306	5–6
12	November 9	Boston	W 123–115	Joe Ingles (27)	Rudy Gobert (15)	Ingles, Rubio (7)	Vivint Smart Home Arena; 18,306	6–6
13	November 12	@ Memphis	W 96–88	Joe Ingles (19)	Rudy Gobert (16)	Joe Ingles (5)	FedExForum; 13,477	7–6
14	November 14	@ Dallas	L 68–118	Ricky Rubio (11)	Rudy Gobert (10)	Rubio, Mitchell (3)	American Airlines Center; 19,371	7–7
15	November 16	@ Philadelphia	L 107–113	Donovan Mitchell (31)	Rudy Gobert (10)	Rubio, Exum (4)	Wells Fargo Center; 20,485	7–8
16	November 17	@ Boston	W 98–86	Donovan Mitchell (28)	Rudy Gobert (9)	Mitchell, Ingles (6)	TD Garden; 18,624	8–8
17	November 19	@ Indiana	L 94–121	Ricky Rubio (28)	Rudy Gobert (11)	Ricky Rubio (6)	Bankers Life Fieldhouse; 17,000	8–9
18	November 21	Sacramento	L 110–119	Donovan Mitchell (35)	Rudy Gobert (15)	Ingles, Rubio (7)	Vivint Smart Home Arena; 19,911	8–10
19	November 23	@ LA Lakers	L 83–90	Alec Burks (17)	Joe Ingles (8)	Ingles, Rubio (5)	Staples Center; 19,060	8–11
20	November 25	@ Sacramento	W 133–112	Ricky Rubio (27)	Rudy Gobert (15)	Joe Ingles (6)	Golden 1 Center; 16,048	9–11
21	November 26	Indiana	L 88–121	Derrick Favors (13)	Derrick Favors (8)	Ricky Rubio (8)	Vivint Smart Home Arena; 18,306	9–12
22	November 28	@ Brooklyn	W 101–91	Donovan Mitchell (29)	Rudy Gobert (16)	Joe Ingles (5)	Barclays Center; 12,928	10–12
23	November 30	@ Charlotte	W 119–111	Donovan Mitchell (30)	Rudy Gobert (17)	Jae Crowder (7)	Spectrum Center; 15,812	11–12

December : 7–7 (home: 6–2; road: 1–5)

Game	Date	Team	Score	High points	High rebounds	High assists	Location Attendance	Record
24	December 2	@ Miami	L 100–102	Ricky Rubio (23)	Rudy Gobert (18)	Ricky Rubio (6)	American Airlines Arena; 19,600	11–13
25	December 4	San Antonio	W 139–105	Donovan Mitchell (20)	Rudy Gobert (10)	Ricky Rubio (7)	Vivint Smart Home Arena; 18,306	12–13
26	December 6	Houston	W 118–91	Derrick Favors (24)	Derrick Favors (10)	Ricky Rubio (6)	Vivint Smart Home Arena; 18,306	13-13
27	December 9	@ San Antonio	L 97–110	Donovan Mitchell (27)	Favors, Gobert (8)	Rudy Gobert (7)	AT&T Center; 17,834	13–14
28	December 10	@ Oklahoma City	L 113–122	Donovan Mitchell (19)	Rudy Gobert (14)	Raul Neto (5)	Chesapeake Energy Arena; 18,203	13–15
29	December 12	Miami	W 111–84	Donovan Mitchell (21)	Rudy Gobert (11)	Ricky Rubio (6)	Vivint Smart Home Arena; 18,306	14–15
30	December 15	@ Orlando	L 89–96	Donovan Mitchell (24)	Rudy Gobert (13)	Ricky Rubio (4)	Mexico City Arena; 20,011	14–16
31	December 17	@ Houston	L 97–102	Donovan Mitchell (23)	Rudy Gobert (13)	Joe Ingles (6)	Toyota Center; 18,055	14–17
32	December 19	Golden State	W 108–103	Joe Ingles (20)	Rudy Gobert (15)	Ricky Rubio (10)	Vivint Smart Home Arena; 18,306	15–17
33	December 21	@ Portland	W 120–90	Ricky Rubio (24)	Rudy Gobert (11)	Ricky Rubio (8)	Moda Center; 19,127	16–17
34	December 22	Oklahoma City	L 106–107	Gobert & Mitchell (20)	Rudy Gobert (10)	Ricky Rubio (14)	Vivint Smart Home Arena; 18,306	16–18
35	December 25	Portland	W 117–96	Donovan Mitchell (19)	Rudy Gobert (14)	Ricky Rubio (6)	Vivint Smart Home Arena; 18,306	17–18
36	December 27	Philadelphia	L 97–114	Donovan Mitchell (23)	Rudy Gobert (15)	Rudy Gobert (5)	Vivint Smart Home Arena; 18,306	17–19
37	December 29	NY Knicks	W 129–97	Rudy Gobert (25)	Rudy Gobert (16)	Dante Exum (13)	Vivint Smart Home Arena; 18,306	18–19

January : 11–4 (home: 7–1; road: 4–3)

Game	Date	Team	Score	High points	High rebounds	High assists	Location Attendance	Record
38	January 1	@ Toronto	L 116–122	Derrick Favors (21)	Favors, Gobert (9)	Ricky Rubio (8)	Scotiabank Arena; 19,800	18–20
39	January 4	@ Cleveland	W 117–91	Donovan Mitchell (18)	Joe Ingles (9)	Dante Exum (7)	Quicken Loans Arena; 19,432	19–20
40	January 5	@ Detroit	W 110–105	Donovan Mitchell (26)	Rudy Gobert (11)	Exum, Mitchell (5)	Little Caesars Arena; 17,255	20–20
41	January 7	@ Milwaukee	L 102–114	Donovan Mitchell (26)	Rudy Gobert (15)	Raul Neto (5)	Fiserv Forum; 17,341	20–21
42	January 9	Orlando	W 106–93	Donovan Mitchell (33)	Rudy Gobert (14)	Mitchell, Ingles (7)	Vivint Smart Home Arena; 18,306	21–21
43	January 11	LA Lakers	W 113–95	Donovan Mitchell (33)	Rudy Gobert (18)	Donovan Mitchell (9)	Vivint Smart Home Arena; 18,306	22–21
44	January 12	Chicago	W 110–102	Donovan Mitchell (34)	Rudy Gobert (16)	Rudy Gobert (8)	Vivint Smart Home Arena; 18,306	23–21
45	January 14	Detroit	W 100–94	Donovan Mitchell (28)	Rudy Gobert (25)	Joe Ingles (8)	Vivint Smart Home Arena; 18,306	24–21
46	January 16	@ L. A. Clippers	W 129–109	Donovan Mitchell (28)	Rudy Gobert (22)	Joe Ingles (8)	Staples Center; 15,535	25–21
47	January 18	Cleveland	W 115–99	Donovan Mitchell (24)	Rudy Gobert (15)	Joe Ingles (8)	Vivint Smart Home Arena; 18,306	26–21
48	January 21	Portland	L 104–109	Donovan Mitchell (26)	Rudy Gobert (13)	Joe Ingles (6)	Vivint Smart Home Arena; 18,306	26–22
49	January 23	Denver	W 114–108	Donovan Mitchell (35)	Rudy Gobert (10)	Mitchell, Rubio (6)	Vivint Smart Home Arena; 18,306	27–22
50	January 25	Minnesota	W 106–102	Donovan Mitchell (24)	Rudy Gobert (16)	Donovan Mitchell (11)	Vivint Smart Home Arena; 18,306	28–22
51	January 27	@ Minnesota	W 125–111	Donovan Mitchell (29)	Derrick Favors (11)	Ricky Rubio (8)	Target Center; 14,542	29–22
52	January 30	@ Portland	L 105–132	Donovan Mitchell (22)	Rudy Gobert (9)	Ricky Rubio (7)	Moda Center; 19,393	29–23

February : 6–3 (home: 5–1; road: 1–2)

Game	Date	Team	Score	High points	High rebounds	High assists	Location Attendance	Record
53	February 1	Atlanta	W 128–112	Rudy Gobert (25)	Rudy Gobert (13)	Ricky Rubio (11)	Vivint Smart Home Arena; 18,306	30–23
54	February 2	Houston	L 98–125	Donovan Mitchell (26)	Rudy Gobert (13)	Donovan Mitchell (9)	Vivint Smart Home Arena; 18,306	30–24
55	February 6	Phoenix	W 116–88	Donovan Mitchell (21)	Rudy Gobert (12)	Joe Ingles (11)	Vivint Smart Home Arena; 18,306	31–24
56	February 9	San Antonio	W 125–105	Donovan Mitchell (23)	Rudy Gobert (13)	Ricky Rubio (6)	Vivint Smart Home Arena; 18,306	32–24
57	February 12	@ Golden State	L 108–115	Donovan Mitchell (25)	Rudy Gobert (16)	Ricky Rubio (6)	Oracle Arena; 19,596	32–25
58	February 22	@ Oklahoma City	L 147–148 (2OT)	Donovan Mitchell (38)	Rudy Gobert (16)	Ricky Rubio (7)	Chesapeake Energy Arena; 18,203	32–26
59	February 23	Dallas	W 125–109	Mitchell, Rubio (25)	Rudy Gobert (12)	Ingles, Mitchell (6)	Vivint Smart Home Arena; 18,306	33–26
60	February 27	L. A. Clippers	W 111–105	Donovan Mitchell (32)	Rudy Gobert (13)	Joe Ingles (6)	Vivint Smart Home Arena; 18,306	34–26
61	February 28	@ Denver	W 111–104	Donovan Mitchell (24)	Rudy Gobert (11)	Joe Ingles (10)	Pepsi Center; 19,520	35–26

March : 11–4 (home: 6–2; road: 5–2)

Game	Date	Team	Score	High points	High rebounds	High assists	Location Attendance	Record
62	March 2	Milwaukee	W 115–111	Donovan Mitchell (46)	Derrick Favors (17)	Joe Ingles (8)	Vivint Smart Home Arena; 18,306	36–26
63	March 4	New Orleans	L 112–115	Crowder, Korver (20)	Rudy Gobert (19)	Joe Ingles (11)	Vivint Smart Home Arena; 18,306	36–27
64	March 6	@ New Orleans	W 114–104	Derrick Favors (25)	Rudy Gobert (13)	Ingles, Rubio (10)	Smoothie King Center; 14,681	37–27
65	March 8	@ Memphis	L 104–114	Donovan Mitchell (38)	Jae Crowder (11)	Joe Ingles (7)	FedExForum; 15,407	37–28
66	March 11	Oklahoma City	L 89–98	Donovan Mitchell (25)	Rudy Gobert (12)	Joe Ingles (8)	Vivint Smart Home Arena; 18,306	37–29
67	March 13	@ Phoenix	W 114–97	Donovan Mitchell (26)	Rudy Gobert (20)	Derrick Favors (7)	Talking Stick Resort Arena; 18,055	38–29
68	March 14	Minnesota	W 120–100	Donovan Mitchell (24)	Rudy Gobert (13)	Ricky Rubio (9)	Vivint Smart Home Arena; 18,306	39–29
69	March 16	Brooklyn	W 114–98	Donovan Mitchell (24)	Rudy Gobert (17)	Ricky Rubio (6)	Vivint Smart Home Arena; 18,306	40–29
70	March 18	@ Washington	W 116–95	Donovan Mitchell (19)	Rudy Gobert (14)	Ricky Rubio (10)	Capital One Arena; 15,637	41–29
71	March 20	@ N. Y. Knicks	W 137–116	Donovan Mitchell (30)	Rudy Gobert (9)	Ricky Rubio (9)	Madison Square Garden; 18,530	42–29
72	March 21	@ Atlanta	L 114–117	Donovan Mitchell (34)	Derrick Favors (15)	Ingles, Rubio (7)	State Farm Arena; 15,569	42–30
73	March 23	@ Chicago	W 114–83	Rudy Gobert (21)	Rudy Gobert (14)	Joe Ingles (5)	United Center; 20,506	43–30
74	March 25	Phoenix	W 125–92	Rudy Gobert (27)	Rudy Gobert (10)	Ricky Rubio (6)	Vivint Smart Home Arena; 18,306	44–30
75	March 27	LA Lakers	W 115–100	Rudy Gobert (22)	Rudy Gobert (11)	Joe Ingles (14)	Vivint Smart Home Arena; 18,306	45–30
76	March 29	Washington	W 128–124	Donovan Mitchell (35)	Rudy Gobert (17)	Joe Ingles (10)	Vivint Smart Home Arena; 18,306	46–30

April : 4–2 (home: 3–0; road: 1–2)

Game	Date	Team	Score	High points	High rebounds	High assists	Location Attendance	Record
77	April 1	Charlotte	W 111–102	Donovan Mitchell (25)	Rudy Gobert (18)	Ricky Rubio (13)	Vivint Smart Home Arena; 18,306	47–30
78	April 3	@ Phoenix	W 118–97	Donovan Mitchell (29)	Rudy Gobert (13)	Joe Ingles (8)	Talking Stick Resort Arena; 15,797	48–30
79	April 5	Sacramento	W 119–98	Donovan Mitchell (23)	Rudy Gobert (11)	Donovan Mitchell (9)	Vivint Smart Home Arena; 18,306	49–30
80	April 7	@ LA Lakers	L 109–113	Rudy Gobert (21)	Rudy Gobert (10)	Joe Ingles (8)	Staples Center; 18,997	49–31
81	April 9	Denver	W 118–108	Donovan Mitchell (46)	Rudy Gobert (10)	Joe Ingles (13)	Vivint Smart Home Arena; 18,306	50–31
82	April 10	@ L. A. Clippers	L 137–143 (OT)	Grayson Allen (40)	Ekpe Udoh (13)	Ekpe Udoh (5)	Staples Center; 17,655	50–32

2018–19 season schedule

== Playoffs ==
=== Game log ===
2019 playoff game log
First Round: 1–4 (home: 1–1; road: 0–3)

Game	Date	Team	Score	High points	High rebounds	High assists	Location Attendance	Series
1	April 14	@ Houston	L 90–122	Rudy Gobert (22)	Rudy Gobert (16)	Ricky Rubio (6)	Toyota Center; 18,055	0–1
2	April 17	@ Houston	L 98–118	Rubio, O'Neale (17)	Rudy Gobert (12)	Ricky Rubio (9)	Toyota Center; 18,055	0–2
3	April 20	Houston	L 101–104	Donovan Mitchell (34)	Gobert, Ingles (8)	Ricky Rubio (6)	Vivint Smart Home Arena; 18,306	0–3
4	April 22	Houston	W 107–91	Donovan Mitchell (31)	Favors, O'Neale (11)	Ricky Rubio (11)	Vivint Smart Home Arena; 18,306	1–3
5*	April 24	@ Houston	L 93–100	Royce O'Neale (18)	Crowder, Gobert (10)	Ricky Rubio (11)	Toyota Center; 18,055	1–4

2019 playoff schedule

== Player statistics ==
=== Regular season ===
Player	Pos.	GP	GS	MP	Reb.	Ast.	Stl.	Blk.	Pts.
Grayson Allen	SG	38	2	416	23	25	6	6	211
Tony Bradley	C	3	0	36	15	1	2	2	17
Alec Burks^{†}	SG	17	0	269	27	20	6	4	143
Tyler Cavanaugh	PF	11	0	39	8	1	0	0	9
Jae Crowder	SF	80	11	2,166	384	133	64	31	951
Dante Exum	PG	42	1	664	68	110	14	5	288
Derrick Favors	C	76	70	1,766	560	89	56	106	897
Rudy Gobert	C	81	80	2,577	1,041	161	66	187	1,284
Joe Ingles	PF	82	82	2,568	330	469	98	20	994
Kyle Korver^{≠}	SG	54	0	1,083	133	64	22	10	492
Donovan Mitchell	SG	77	77	2,598	316	322	106	31	1,829
Naz Mitrou-Long	SG	14	0	84	6	15	1	1	16
Raul Neto	PG	37	1	474	62	93	14	4	196
Georges Niang	PF	59	0	516	87	35	10	6	235
Royce O'Neale	SF	82	16	1,671	285	124	54	24	426
Ricky Rubio	PG	68	67	1,899	243	416	91	10	864
Thabo Sefolosha	SF	50	2	609	123	27	43	5	190
Ekpe Udoh	C	51	1	320	90	28	10	31	119

After all games.
^{‡}Waived during the season
^{†}Traded during the season
^{≠}Acquired during the season

=== Playoffs ===
Player	Pos.	GP	GS	MP	Reb.	Ast.	Stl.	Blk.	Pts.
Grayson Allen	SG	2	0	14	1	0	0	0	9
Jae Crowder	SF	5	3	130	29	4	5	0	57
Derrick Favors	C	5	2	103	37	4	4	9	59
Rudy Gobert	C	5	5	152	51	7	3	13	56
Joe Ingles	PF	5	5	151	24	25	11	0	32
Kyle Korver	SG	4	0	30	5	0	0	0	10
Donovan Mitchell	SG	5	5	193	25	16	8	1	107
Raul Neto	PG	3	0	20	3	1	0	0	2
Georges Niang	PF	5	0	55	14	5	1	1	22
Royce O'Neale	SF	5	0	137	23	8	2	2	53
Ricky Rubio	PG	5	5	168	16	43	12	1	77
Thabo Sefolosha	SF	4	0	42	8	2	0	0	5
Ekpe Udoh	C	2	0	6	0	0	0	0	0

== Transactions ==
=== Free agency ===
==== Re-signed ====
Player	Signed
Dante Exum	July 6, 2018
Derrick Favors	July 6, 2018
Raul Neto	July 6, 2018
Georges Niang	July 13, 2018

==== Additions ====
Player	Signed	Former team
Jairus Lyles	July 12, 2018	UMBC Retrievers
Naz Mitrou-Long	Two-way contract	Salt Lake City Stars
Tyler Cavanaugh	Two-way contract	Atlanta Hawks
Isaac Haas	August 16, 2018	Purdue Boilermakers
Trey Lewis	August 28, 2018	(France) JL Bourg Basket

==== Subtractions ====
Player	Reason left	New team
Jonas Jerebko	Waived	Golden State Warriors
Erik McCree	Unrestricted free agent	(Italy) VL Pesaro
David Stockton	Waived	(Germany) Medi Bayreuth
