= Alize Johnson =

American basketball player (born 1996)

No. 24 – Paris Basketball
- Position: Power forward
- League: LNB Élite

Personal information
- Born: April 22, 1996 (age 30) Williamsport, Pennsylvania, U.S.
- Listed height: 6 ft 8 in (2.03 m)
- Listed weight: 212 lb (96 kg)

Career information
- High school: St. John Neumann (Williamsport, Pennsylvania)
- College: Frank Phillips (2014–2016); Missouri State (2016–2018)
- NBA draft: 2018: 2nd round, 50th overall pick
- Drafted by: Indiana Pacers
- Playing career: 2018–present

Career history
- 2018–2020: Indiana Pacers
- 2018–2020: →Fort Wayne Mad Ants
- 2021: Raptors 905
- 2021: Brooklyn Nets
- 2021: Chicago Bulls
- 2021–2022: Washington Wizards
- 2022: New Orleans Pelicans
- 2022: Austin Spurs
- 2022: San Antonio Spurs
- 2022–2023: Austin Spurs
- 2023: Wisconsin Herd
- 2023–2024: Busan KCC Egis
- 2024: Atléticos de San Germán
- 2024–2025: Kawasaki Brave Thunders
- 2025–2026: Iowa Wolves
- 2026: Shenzhen Leopards
- 2026–present: Paris Basketball

Career highlights
- KBL champion (2024); All-NBA G League Second Team (2021); 2× First-team All-MVC (2017, 2018); MVC Newcomer of the Year (2017)
- Stats at NBA.com
- Stats at Basketball Reference

Alize DeShawn Johnson (born April 22, 1996) is an American professional basketball player for Paris Basketball of the LNB Élite and the EuroLeague. He played college basketball for the Missouri State Bears of the Missouri Valley Conference. Johnson was selected with the 50th pick in the second round of the 2018 NBA draft by the Indiana Pacers.

== Early years ==
Johnson was born in Williamsport, Pennsylvania. As a freshman at St. John Neumann Regional Academy Johnson was a physically underwhelming 5-foot 9-inch point guard. By the time his high school days were over, however, Johnson had grown to 6 feet 4 inches while turning in a fairly decorated career along the way. Despite leading his team to a 30–1 record while averaging 24.1 points, 15.0 rebounds and 6.3 assists per game, Johnson had no Division I offers after his senior year, with only a little bit of interest from St. Peters and St. Francis. Johnson played his AAU basketball for Team Pennsylvania, based out of Harrisburg.

== College career ==
Because of Johnson's lack of Division I offers he attended Frank Phillips College for his freshman and sophomore years. He then transferred to Missouri State University to finish his athletic and academic career.

On November 11, 2016, Johnson scored 20 points and grabbed 10 rebounds in a 91–65 win over Jacksonville State, and on December 14, 2016, he scored 20 points and recorded 16 rebound in a ten-point win over Oral Roberts. Later that month on December 30 Johnson scored a career-high 30 points on 50% shooting and grabbed 15 rebounds in an 81–75 overtime win over Indiana State. Johnson finished 2016–17 with 17 double-doubles scoring 20 or more points in nine games and grabbing 10+ rebounds in twenty-two games including a stretch in January of ten straight 10+ rebounds. Also Johnson had 20 or more rebounds twice and one thirty-point game, including a 21-rebound effort in February. He was named to the MVC All-Tournament team.

On April 21, 2017, Johnson declared for the 2017 NBA draft; however, Johnson did not hire an agent allowing him to return for his senior season. This move was most likely to receive feedback from NBA teams to see the interest. On May 15, 2017, Johnson was invited for a private workout with the Boston Celtics. Prior to the draft Johnson withdrew his name from the draft and returned to MSU for his senior year.

Prior to the 2017–18 season, Johnson was invited to the Adidas Nations basketball camp with the likes of Michael Porter Jr. and other top level NBA talent. Johnson was named Most Valuable Player in the camp over these players and thus improved his draft stock and multiple NBA teams took notice. Mock drafts had Johnson in the middle to the late first round and others beginning of the second round prior to the season.

== Professional career ==
=== Indiana Pacers (2018–2020) ===
On June 21, 2018, Johnson was selected by the Indiana Pacers with the 50th pick in the 2018 NBA draft. On July 6, 2018, Johnson made his debut for the Pacers at the 2018 NBA Summer League in Las Vegas where against the Houston Rockets Johnson scored 15 points had 4 rebounds and 2 assists in 16 minutes of play. In the Pacers 2018 summer league finale Johnson started scoring 12 points grabbing 14 rebounds and having 4 assists. Johnson played in 4 games during the 2018 summer league averaging 12.4 ppg, 8.6 rpg and 1.6 apg in 23 minutes played.

On July 17, 2018, Johnson signed a two-year, guaranteed contract worth $2,255,316 with the Pacers.

On October 19, 2018, Johnson made his NBA debut vs the Milwaukee Bucks and scored two points in four minutes of play in a 118–101 loss. Johnson remained with the team playing in two more games before being moved down to the Fort Wayne Mad Ants on October 27. Johnson remained on the Mad Ants being called up for three games in December. He remained with the Pacers throughout all of January playing in seven games with limited minutes played. Johnson remained in the G League until its season ended. Johnson finished the season with averages of 18.8 points per game, 13.5 rebounds per game, 3.3 assists per game and 1.4 blocks per game. In the Pacers season finale on April 10, 2019, Johnson saw significant playing time in 25 minutes he score 7 points and 11 rebounds in a 135–134 win over the Atlanta Hawks.

On August 14, 2020, Johnson recorded a career-high 17 rebounds in the Pacers' 109–92 win over the Miami Heat.

=== Raptors 905 (2021) ===
On November 27, 2020, Johnson signed an Exhibit 10 deal with the Toronto Raptors The signing was confirmed by the Raptors on December 1, 2020. and was waived on December 19. On January 27, 2021, Johnson signed with Raptors 905 of the NBA G League. In 15 games, he averaged 16.6 points, 13.3 rebounds, 4.2 assists and 1.3 steals in 32.1 minutes per game, helping the Raptors have the season's best record.

=== Brooklyn Nets (2021) ===
On March 22, 2021, Johnson signed a 10-day contract with the Brooklyn Nets. On March 24, in his debut with the Nets, Johnson recorded a career-high 23 points along with 15 rebounds in the Nets' 118–88 loss to the Utah Jazz. On April 1, Johnson was signed to a second 10-day contract. On April 11, Johnson agreed to a multi-year contract. On April 29, Johnson recorded a double-double with 20 points and a career-high 21 rebounds in a 130–113 win over the Indiana Pacers. On September 3, he was waived by the Nets.

=== Chicago Bulls (2021) ===
On September 8, 2021, Johnson signed with the Chicago Bulls. On December 26, he was waived.

=== Washington Wizards (2021–2022) ===
On December 28, 2021, Johnson signed a 10-day contract with the Washington Wizards.

=== New Orleans Pelicans (2022) ===
On March 2, 2022, Johnson signed another 10-day contract, this time with the New Orleans Pelicans. He made his debut for the team that evening. On March 11, he was waived. A day later, he signed a 10-day contract with the Pelicans via the hardship exception.

=== Austin / San Antonio Spurs (2022–2023) ===
On October 24, 2022, Johnson joined the Austin Spurs training camp roster.

On November 29, 2022, Johnson signed a contract to join the San Antonio Spurs. On December 13, he was waived by the Spurs and two days later, he rejoined Austin.

=== Wisconsin Herd (2023) ===
On January 28, 2023, the Wisconsin Herd announced via their Twitter account that they had acquired Johnson from Austin Spurs for Brandon Randolph.

=== Jeonju KCC Egis (2023–2024) ===
On August 3, 2023, Johnson signed with Jeonju KCC Egis of the Korean Basketball League.

=== Atléticos de San Germán (2024) ===
On May 15, 2024, Johnson signed with the Atléticos de San Germán of the Baloncesto Superior Nacional.

=== Kawasaki Brave Thunders (2024–2025) ===
On June 24, 2024, Johnson signed with the Kawasaki Brave Thunders of the B.League.

=== Iowa Wolves (2025–2026) ===
On November 6, 2025, Johnson was named to the Iowa Wolves' opening night roster.

=== Shenzhen Leopards (2026) ===
On February 10, 2026, Johnson signed a "lucrative" contract with the Shenzhen Leopards of the Chinese Basketball Association.

== Personal life ==
Johnson is the son of David Hill and Chanelle Johnson. Johnson has three brothers David, Davion, and Nasza as well as four sisters, Davesha, Destiny, Davida and Alana. He is the cousin of fellow professional basketball player Chevon Troutman, who plays overseas. Johnson graduated with a communications degree from Missouri State University in 2018.

=== Charitable work and activism ===
Johnson is very active in the charity and activism landscape. Johnson mainly focuses on his hometown of Williamsport, Pennsylvania, but has also been a player in the Indianapolis area as well, participating in multiple community events with the Pacers and Mad Ants. In late 2018, Johnson launched the Alize Johnson Foundation; the foundation's first major fundraiser gave out Thanksgiving meals to over 100 families in need in Williamsport. In November 2018, Johnson donated basketball shoes for three Lycoming County varsity high school basketball teams, over 40 players from Williamsport, Loyalsock and St. John Neumann high schools were given pairs. In early 2019, Johnson announced he was donated $145,000 to open a basketball court at park. On June 2, 2019, Johnson and city officials opened the court. In July 2019, Johnson held his first annual basketball camp in Springfield at his alma mater. On July 19, 2019, Johnson held his first basketball camp at his former high school. Forty-five kids participated and were given signed Pacers gear and all of the costs were absorbed by Johnson's foundation.

== Career statistics ==
Legend
GP	Games played	GS	Games started	MPG	Minutes per game
FG%	Field goal percentage	3P%	3-point field goal percentage	FT%	Free throw percentage
RPG	Rebounds per game	APG	Assists per game	SPG	Steals per game
BPG	Blocks per game	PPG	Points per game	**Bold**	Career high

=== NBA ===
==== Regular season ====
Year	Team	GP	GS	MPG	FG%	3P%	FT%	RPG	APG	SPG	BPG	PPG
2018–19	Indiana	14	0	4.6	.250	**.500**	.500	1.4	.1	.1	.2	.9
2019–20	Indiana	17	**1**	6.9	.414	.375	.700	2.8	.4	.2	.1	2.0
2020–21	Brooklyn	**18**	0	**10.5**	**.588**	.167	**1.000**	**5.0**	**.8**	.3	**.3**	**5.2**
2021–22	Chicago	16	0	7.6	.522	.000	.571	2.3	.5	.2	.0	1.8
2021–22	Washington	3	0	6.0	.333	.000	.000	4.0	.0	.0	.0	1.3
2021–22	New Orleans	4	0	7.0	.300	—	.750	3.3	.3	**.5**	.0	2.3
2022–23	San Antonio	4	0	7.4	.500	.000	.500	2.5	.3	.3	.0	1.8
Career		76	1	7.5	.481	.227	.711	3.0	.4	.2	.1	2.5

==== Playoffs ====
Year	Team	GP	GS	MPG	FG%	3P%	FT%	RPG	APG	SPG	BPG	PPG
2020	Indiana	1	0	.2	—	—	—	.0	.0	.0	.0	.0
2021	Brooklyn	**5**	0	**4.6**	**.571**	—	—	**2.6**	.0	**.6**	.0	**1.6**
Career		6	0	3.8	.571	—	—	2.2	.0	.5	.0	1.3

=== College ===
Year	Team	GP	GS	MPG	FG%	3P%	FT%	RPG	APG	SPG	BPG	PPG
2016–17	Missouri State	**33**	**33**	30.2	**.488**	**.388**	.667	10.6	1.9	**.6**	.1	14.8
2017–18	Missouri State	**33**	**33**	**31.2**	.430	.281	**.759**	**11.6**	**2.8**	.5	**.4**	**15.0**
Career		66	66	30.7	.457	.325	.716	11.1	2.4	.5	.3	14.9

== See also ==
- List of people from Lycoming County, Pennsylvania
