= 2018–19 Indiana Pacers season =

NBA professional basketball team season

- Head coach: Nate McMillan
- President: Kevin Pritchard
- General manager: Chad Buchanan
- Owners: Herbert Simon
- Arena: Bankers Life Fieldhouse

Results
- Record: 48–34 (.585)
- Place: Division: 2nd (Central); Conference: 5th (Eastern)
- Playoff finish: First round (lost to Celtics 0–4)
- Stats at Basketball Reference

Local media
- Television: Fox Sports Indiana
- Radio: 1070 The Fan

The 2018–19 Indiana Pacers season was Indiana's 52nd season as a franchise and 43rd season in the NBA.

The Pacers endured a major setback when their star player, Victor Oladipo, suffered a season-ending knee injury in a January game against Toronto. Oladipo was nevertheless voted an All-Star reserve. The Pacers struggled after Oladipo's injury, posting a 16–19 record during the rest of the season. Despite their late-season struggles, the Pacers clinched a playoff appearance and matched their 48–34 record from the previous year.

The Pacers were defeated in four games by the Boston Celtics in the first round of the playoffs. For the second time in three years the Pacers were swept in the playoffs, and the loss marked their fourth consecutive defeat in the first round.

== NBA draft ==
Round	Pick	Player	Position	Nationality	College / Club
1	23	Aaron Holiday	PG	United States	UCLA
2	50	Alize Johnson	PF	United States	Missouri State

== Roster ==
2018–19 Indiana Pacers roster
Players

Pos.	No.	Player	Height	Weight	DOB	From
F	44	Bojan Bogdanović	6 ft 8 in (2.03 m)	216 lb (98 kg)	1989-04-18	Croatia
G	2	Darren Collison	6 ft 0 in (1.83 m)	175 lb (79 kg)	1987-08-23	UCLA
G	12	Tyreke Evans	6 ft 6 in (1.98 m)	220 lb (100 kg)	1989-09-19	Memphis
G	3	Aaron Holiday	6 ft 1 in (1.85 m)	185 lb (84 kg)	1996-09-30	UCLA
F	24	Alize Johnson	6 ft 9 in (2.06 m)	212 lb (96 kg)	1996-04-22	Missouri State
G	6	Cory Joseph	6 ft 3 in (1.91 m)	193 lb (88 kg)	1991-08-20	Texas
F	22	T. J. Leaf	6 ft 10 in (2.08 m)	225 lb (102 kg)	1997-04-30	UCLA
G	23	Wesley Matthews	6 ft 5 in (1.96 m)	220 lb (100 kg)	1986-10-14	Marquette
F	20	Doug McDermott	6 ft 6 in (1.98 m)	225 lb (102 kg)	1992-01-03	Creighton
G	4	Victor Oladipo (injured)	6 ft 4 in (1.93 m)	210 lb (95 kg)	1992-05-04	Indiana
C	10	Kyle O'Quinn	6 ft 10 in (2.08 m)	250 lb (113 kg)	1990-03-26	Norfolk State
G	32	Davon Reed (TW)	6 ft 5 in (1.96 m)	208 lb (94 kg)	1995-06-11	Miami (FL)
F	11	Domantas Sabonis	6 ft 11 in (2.11 m)	240 lb (109 kg)	1996-05-03	Gonzaga
G	5	Edmond Sumner	6 ft 6 in (1.98 m)	176 lb (80 kg)	1995-12-31	Xavier
C	33	Myles Turner	7 ft 0 in (2.13 m)	255 lb (116 kg)	1996-03-24	Texas
F	21	Thaddeus Young	6 ft 8 in (2.03 m)	221 lb (100 kg)	1988-06-21	Georgia Tech

Coaches
Head coach
- Nate McMillan
Assistant(s)
- Bill Bayno
- Dan Burke
- Popeye Jones
- David McClure (player development)

Legend
- (DP) Unsigned draft pick
- (FA) Free agent
- (S) Suspended
- (GL) On assignment to G League affiliate
- (TW) Two-way affiliate player
- Injured

Roster
Updated: 2019-02-10

== Standings ==
=== Division ===
Central Division	W	L	PCT	GB	Home	Road	Div	GP
z – Milwaukee Bucks	60	22	.732	–	33‍–‍8	27‍–‍14	14–2	82
x – Indiana Pacers	48	34	.585	12.0	29‍–‍12	19‍–‍22	11–5	82
x – Detroit Pistons	41	41	.500	19.0	26‍–‍15	15‍–‍26	8–8	82
Chicago Bulls	22	60	.268	38.0	9‍–‍32	13‍–‍28	3–13	82
Cleveland Cavaliers	19	63	.232	41.0	13‍–‍28	6‍–‍35	4–12	82

=== Conference ===
Eastern Conference
#	Team	W	L	PCT	GB	GP
1	z – Milwaukee Bucks *	60	22	.732	–	82
2	y – Toronto Raptors *	58	24	.707	2.0	82
3	x – Philadelphia 76ers	51	31	.622	9.0	82
4	x – Boston Celtics	49	33	.598	11.0	82
5	x – Indiana Pacers	48	34	.585	12.0	82
6	x – Brooklyn Nets	42	40	.512	18.0	82
7	y – Orlando Magic *	42	40	.512	18.0	82
8	x – Detroit Pistons	41	41	.500	19.0	82
9	Charlotte Hornets	39	43	.476	21.0	82
10	Miami Heat	39	43	.476	21.0	82
11	Washington Wizards	32	50	.390	28.0	82
12	Atlanta Hawks	29	53	.354	31.0	82
13	Chicago Bulls	22	60	.268	38.0	82
14	Cleveland Cavaliers	19	63	.232	41.0	82
15	New York Knicks	17	65	.207	43.0	82

== Game log ==
=== Preseason ===
2018 preseason game log
Total: 2–2 (home: 0–0; road: 2–2)
Preseason: 2–2 (home: 0–0; road: 2–2)

Game	Date	Team	Score	High points	High rebounds	High assists	Location Attendance	Record
1	October 4	@ Houston	W 110–100	Victor Oladipo (24)	Leaf, Sabonis (12)	T. J. Leaf (4)	Toyota Center; 17,089	1–0
2	October 6	@ Memphis	L 104–109 (OT)	Aaron Holiday (20)	Domantas Sabonis (14)	Cory Joseph (6)	FedEx Forum; 11,615	1–1
3	October 8	@ Cleveland	W 111–102	Victor Oladipo (23)	Domantas Sabonis (12)	Tyreke Evans (6)	Quicken Loans Arena; 16,330	2–1
4	October 10	@ Chicago	L 89–104	Thaddeus Young (16)	Thaddeus Young (10)	Darren Collison (5)	United Center; 17,162	2–2

2018–19 season schedule

=== Regular season ===
2018–19 game log
Total: 48–34 (home: 29–12; road: 19–22)
October: 5–3 (home: 2–1; road: 3–2)

Game	Date	Team	Score	High points	High rebounds	High assists	Location Attendance	Record
1	October 17	Memphis	111–83	Bojan Bogdanovic (19)	Domantas Sabonis (15)	Tyreke Evans (6)	Bankers Life Fieldhouse; 17,923	1–0
2	October 19	@ Milwaukee	101–118	Victor Oladipo (25)	Domantas Sabonis (13)	Tyreke Evans (4)	Fiserv Forum; 17,341	1–1
3	October 20	Brooklyn	132–112	Victor Oladipo (25)	Myles Turner (8)	Cory Joseph (6)	Bankers Life Fieldhouse; 17,007	2–1
4	October 22	@ Minnesota	91–101	Oladipo, Bogdanovic (20)	Oladipo, Sabonis (7)	Darren Collison (6)	Target Center; 10,371	2–2
5	October 24	@ San Antonio	116–96	Victor Oladipo (21)	Domantas Sabonis (10)	Victor Oladipo (9)	AT&T Center; 18,354	3–2
6	October 27	@ Cleveland	119–107	Victor Oladipo (24)	Sabonis, Joseph (5)	Oladipo, Collison (6)	Quicken Loans Arena; 19,432	4–2
7	October 29	Portland	93–103	Victor Oladipo (21)	Victor Oladipo (9)	Victor Oladipo (7)	Bankers Life Fieldhouse; 15,788	4–3
8	October 31	@ New York	107–101	Victor Oladipo (24)	Thaddeus Young (10)	Joseph, Collison (6)	Madison Square Garden; 18,295	5–3

November : 8–6 (home: 4–3; road: 4–3)

Game	Date	Team	Score	High points	High rebounds	High assists	Location Attendance	Record
9	November 2	@ Chicago	107–105	Victor Oladipo (25)	Victor Oladipo (14)	Victor Oladipo (5)	United Center; 19,704	6–3
10	November 3	Boston	102–101	Victor Oladipo (24)	Victor Oladipo (12)	Sabonis, Young (5)	Bankers Life Fieldhouse; 17,505	7–3
11	November 5	Houston	94–98	Victor Oladipo (28)	Thaddeus Young (11)	Domantas Sabonis (5)	Bankers Life Fieldhouse; 14,735	7–4
12	November 7	Philadelphia	94–100	Victor Oladipo (36)	Domantas Sabonis (11)	Victor Oladipo (7)	Bankers Life Fieldhouse; 16,434	7–5
13	November 9	@ Miami	110–102	Victor Oladipo (22)	Domantas Sabonis (11)	Victor Oladipo (10)	American Airlines Arena; 19,600	8–5
14	November 11	@ Houston	103–115	Victor Oladipo (22)	Victor Oladipo (10)	Victor Oladipo (7)	Toyota Center; 18,055	8–6
15	November 16	Miami	99–91	Tyreke Evans (23)	Domantas Sabonis (12)	Oladipo, Joseph (5)	Bankers Life Fieldhouse; 17,923	9–6
16	November 17	Atlanta	97–89	Bojan Bogdanovic (22)	Domantas Sabonis (16)	Domantas Sabonis (6)	Bankers Life Fieldhouse; 17,491	10–6
17	November 19	Utah	121–94	Bojan Bogdanovic (21)	Domantas Sabonis (9)	Darren Collison (7)	Bankers Life Fieldhouse; 17,000	11–6
18	November 21	@ Charlotte	109–127	Bojan Bogdanovic (20)	Myles Turner (7)	Cory Joseph (7)	Spectrum Center; 15,913	11–7
19	November 23	San Antonio	100–111	Bojan Bogdanovic (21)	Domantas Sabonis (16)	Cory Joseph (7)	Bankers Life Fieldhouse; 17,262	11–8
20	November 26	@ Utah	121–88	Doug McDermott (21)	Domantas Sabonis (10)	Darren Collison (11)	Vivint Smart Home Arena; 18,306	12–8
21	November 27	@ Phoenix	109–104	McDermott, Sabonis (21)	Domantas Sabonis (16)	Darren Collison (11)	Talking Stick Resort Arena; 13,038	13–8
22	November 29	@ L.A. Lakers	96–104	Domantas Sabonis (20)	Domantas Sabonis (15)	Cory Joseph (6)	Staples Center; 18,997	13–9

December : 12–3 (home: 8–1; road: 4–2)

Game	Date	Team	Score	High points	High rebounds	High assists	Location Attendance	Record
23	December 1	@ Sacramento	110–111	Bojan Bogdanovic (27)	Myles Turner (12)	Darren Collison (12)	Golden 1 Center; 17,583	13–10
24	December 4	Chicago	96–90	Darren Collison (23)	Myles Turner, Sabonis (11)	Turner, Joseph, Collison, Holiday (3)	Bankers Life Fieldhouse; 16,446	14–10
25	December 7	@ Orlando	112–90	Bojan Bogdanovic (26)	Kyle O'Quinn (10)	Darren Collison (8)	Amway Center; 17,214	15–10
26	December 8	Sacramento	107–97	Thaddeus Young (20)	Myles Turner (13)	Cory Joseph (8)	Bankers Life Fieldhouse; 16,867	16–10
27	December 10	Washington	109–101	Myles Turner (26)	Turner, Young (12)	Darren Collison (17)	Bankers Life Fieldhouse; 14,645	17–10
28	December 12	Milwaukee	113–97	Thaddeus Young (25)	Thaddeus Young (11)	Darren Collison (7)	Bankers Life Fieldhouse; 17,070	18–10
29	December 14	@ Philadelphia	113–101	Thaddeus Young (26)	Domantas Sabonis (16)	Darren Collison (10)	Wells Fargo Center; 20,337	19–10
30	December 16	New York	110–99	Victor Oladipo (26)	Domantas Sabonis (12)	Victor Oladipo (7)	Bankers Life Fieldhouse; 16,646	20–10
31	December 18	Cleveland	91–92	Domantas Sabonis (17)	Myles Turner (10)	Victor Oladipo (10)	Bankers Life Fieldhouse; 15,630	20–11
32	December 19	@ Toronto	96–99	Victor Oladipo (20)	Myles Turner (14)	Collison, Oladipo (4)	Scotiabank Arena; 19,800	20–12
33	December 21	@ Brooklyn	114–106	Victor Oladipo (26)	Myles Turner (12)	Victor Oladipo (6)	Barclays Center; 13,302	21–12
34	December 23	Washington	105–89	Myles Turner (18)	Myles Turner (17)	Victor Oladipo (9)	Bankers Life Fieldhouse; 17,923	22–12
35	December 26	@ Atlanta	129–121	Thaddeus Young (21)	Domantas Sabonis (8)	Darren Collison (8)	State Farm Arena; 15,026	23–12
36	December 28	Detroit	125–88	Collison, Sabonis (19)	Domantas Sabonis (12)	Victor Oladipo (8)	Bankers Life Fieldhouse; 17,923	24–12
37	December 31	Atlanta	116–108	Victor Oladipo (22)	Turner, Sabonis (8)	Victor Oladipo (7)	Bankers Life Fieldhouse; 17,923	25–12

January : 7–7 (home: 4–2; road: 3–5)

Game	Date	Team	Score	High points	High rebounds	High assists	Location Attendance	Record
38	January 4	@ Chicago	119–116 (OT)	Victor Oladipo (36)	Domantas Sabonis (12)	Cory Joseph (6)	United Center; 21,284	26–12
39	January 6	@ Toronto	105–121	Bojan Bogdanovic (21)	Domantas Sabonis (11)	Domantas Sabonis (6)	Scotiabank Arena; 19,800	26–13
40	January 8	@ Cleveland	123–115	Thaddeus Young (26)	Domantas Sabonis (9)	Darren Collison (9)	Quicken Loans Arena; 19,432	27–13
41	January 9	@ Boston	108–135	Domantas Sabonis (20)	Thaddeus Young (8)	Evans, Sabonis (5)	TD Garden; 18,624	27–14
42	January 11	@ New York	121–106	Domantas Sabonis (22)	Domantas Sabonis (15)	Darren Collison (10)	Madison Square Garden; 19,812	28–14
43	January 15	Phoenix	131–97	Evans, Bogdanovic (20)	Domantas Sabonis (8)	Darren Collison (7)	Bankers Life Fieldhouse; 15,698	29–14
44	January 17	Philadelphia	96–120	Thaddeus Young (27)	Myles Turner (12)	Victor Oladipo (7)	Bankers Life Fieldhouse; 16,007	29–15
45	January 19	Dallas	111–99	Tyreke Evans (19)	Domantas Sabonis (11)	Victor Oladipo (6)	Bankers Life Fieldhouse; 17,508	30–15
46	January 20	Charlotte	120–95	Victor Oladipo (21)	Myles Turner (13)	Darren Collison (9)	Bankers Life Fieldhouse; 15,015	31–15
47	January 23	Toronto	110–106	Thaddeus Young (23)	Thaddeus Young (15)	Darren Collison (8)	Bankers Life Fieldhouse; 16,879	32–15
48	January 26	@ Memphis	103–106	Bojan Bogdanovic (21)	Young, Sabonis (8)	Darren Collison (9)	FedExForum; 14,486	32–16
49	January 28	Golden State	100–132	Myles Turner (16)	Thaddeus Young (7)	Darren Collison (8)	Bankers Life Fieldhouse; 17,923	32–17
50	January 30	@ Washington	89–107	Thaddeus Young (13)	Domantas Sabonis (8)	Cory Joseph (6)	Capital One Arena; 15,354	32–18
51	January 31	@ Orlando	100–107	Myles Turner (27)	Thaddeus Young (10)	Darren Collison (10)	Amway Center; 16,625	32–19

February : 9–3 (home: 6–1; road: 3–2)

Game	Date	Team	Score	High points	High rebounds	High assists	Location Attendance	Record
52	February 2	@ Miami	95–88	Bojan Bogdanovic (31)	Domantas Sabonis (10)	Collison, Joseph (10)	American Airlines Arena; 19,600	33–19
53	February 4	@ New Orleans	109–107	Darren Collison (22)	Domantas Sabonis (13)	Darren Collison (6)	Smoothie King Center; 15,780	34–19
54	February 5	L.A. Lakers	136–94	Bojan Bogdanovic (24)	Thaddeus Young (11)	Thaddeus Young (8)	Bankers Life Fieldhouse; 17,265	35–19
55	February 7	L.A. Clippers	116–92	Bojan Bogdanovic (29)	Domantas Sabonis (8)	Domantas Sabonis (6)	Bankers Life Fieldhouse; 15,756	36–19
56	February 9	Cleveland	105–90	Bojan Bogdanovic (23)	Domantas Sabonis (10)	Darren Collison (9)	Bankers Life Fieldhouse; 17,923	37–19
57	February 11	Charlotte	99–90	Myles Turner (18)	Domantas Sabonis (9)	Darren Collison (8)	Bankers Life Fieldhouse; 17,165	38–19
58	February 13	Milwaukee	97–106	Myles Turner (20)	Domantas Sabonis (9)	Darren Collison (7)	Bankers Life Fieldhouse; 17,311	38–20
59	February 22	New Orleans	126–111	Wesley Matthews (24)	Domantas Sabonis (13)	Darren Collison (12)	Bankers Life Fieldhouse; 16,962	39–20
60	February 23	@ Washington	119–112	Thaddeus Young (22)	Domantas Sabonis (12)	O'Quinn, Collison (5)	Capital One Arena; 19,648	40–20
61	February 25	@ Detroit	109–113	Bojan Bogdanovic (25)	Thaddeus Young (12)	Darren Collison (5)	Little Caesars Arena; 15,321	40–21
62	February 27	@ Dallas	101–110	Bojan Bogdanovic (22)	T. J. Leaf (7)	Thaddeus Young (5)	American Airlines Center; 19,978	40–22
63	February 28	Minnesota	122–115	Bojan Bogdanovic (37)	Bogdanovic, Collison (7)	Cory Joseph (12)	Bankers Life Fieldhouse; 17,003	41–22

March : 4–10 (home: 4–2; road: 0–8)

Game	Date	Team	Score	High points	High rebounds	High assists	Location Attendance	Record
64	March 2	Orlando	112–117	Bojan Bogdanovic (25)	Young, Turner (6)	Darren Collison (10)	Bankers Life Fieldhouse; 17,923	41–23
65	March 5	Chicago	105–96	Bojan Bogdanovic (27)	Myles Turner (11)	Thaddeus Young (6)	Bankers Life Fieldhouse; 15,753	42–23
66	March 7	@ Milwaukee	98–117	Myles Turner (22)	Myles Turner (17)	Darren Collison (9)	Fiserv Forum; 17,884	42–24
67	March 10	@ Philadelphia	89–106	Bojan Bogdanovic (18)	Thaddeus Young (9)	Domantas Sabonis (6)	Wells Fargo Center; 20,636	42–25
68	March 12	New York	103–98	Bojan Bogdanovic (24)	Myles Turner (9)	Darren Collison (9)	Bankers Life Fieldhouse; 16,679	43–25
69	March 14	Oklahoma City	108–106	Bojan Bogdanovic (23)	Matthews, Sabonis (7)	Darren Collison (7)	Bankers Life Fieldhouse; 16,656	44–25
70	March 16	@ Denver	100–102	Thaddeus Young (18)	Thaddeus Young (10)	Wesley Matthews (4)	Pepsi Center; 19,856	44–26
71	March 18	@ Portland	98–106	Myles Turner (28)	Young, Turner (10)	Darren Collison (7)	Moda Center; 19,393	44–27
72	March 19	@ L.A. Clippers	109–115	Bogdanovic, Evans (19)	Domantas Sabonis (16)	Tyreke Evans (7)	Staples Center; 16,043	44–28
73	March 21	@ Golden State	89–112	Tyreke Evans (20)	Domantas Sabonis (12)	Kyle O'Quinn (4)	Oracle Arena; 19,596	44–29
74	March 24	Denver	124–88	Bojan Bogdanovic (35)	Domantas Sabonis (13)	Young, Matthews, Holiday (5)	Bankers Life Fieldhouse; 17,920	45–29
75	March 27	@ Oklahoma City	99–107	Bojan Bogdanovic (28)	Myles Turner (14)	Darren Collison (6)	Chesapeake Energy Arena; 18,203	45–30
76	March 29	@ Boston	112–114	Bojan Bogdanovic (27)	Myles Turner (11)	Darren Collison (7)	TD Garden; 18,624	45–31
77	March 30	Orlando	116–121	Bojan Bogdanovic (22)	Myles Turner (12)	Darren Collison (9)	Bankers Life Fieldhouse; 17,923	45–32

April : 3–2 (home: 1–2; road: 2–0)

Game	Date	Team	Score	High points	High rebounds	High assists	Location Attendance	Record
78	April 1	Detroit	111–102	Young, Bogdanovic (19)	Domantas Sabonis (12)	Bojan Bogdanovic (6)	Bankers Life Fieldhouse; 15,760	46–32
79	April 3	@ Detroit	108–89	Thaddeus Young (21)	Domantas Sabonis (13)	Cory Joseph (12)	Little Caesars Arena; 18,984	47–32
80	April 5	Boston	97–117	Myles Turner (15)	Turner, Evans (7)	Cory Joseph (8)	Bankers Life Fieldhouse; 17,371	47–33
81	April 7	Brooklyn	96–108	Domantas Sabonis (17)	Domantas Sabonis (12)	Aaron Holiday (7)	Bankers Life Fieldhouse; 16,197	47–34
82	April 10	@ Atlanta	135–134	T. J. Leaf (28)	Alize Johnson (11)	Tyreke Evans (5)	State Farm Arena; 17,143	48–34

2018–19 season schedule

=== Playoffs ===
2019 playoff game log
Total: 0–4 (home: 0–2; road: 0–2)
First Round: 0–4 (home: 0–2; road: 0–2)

Game	Date	Team	Score	High points	High rebounds	High assists	Location Attendance	Series
1	April 14	@ Boston	L 74–84	Cory Joseph (24)	Domantas Sabonis (9)	Thaddeus Young (6)	TD Garden; 18,624	0–1
2	April 17	@ Boston	L 91–99	Bojan Bogdanovic (23)	Bojan Bogdanovic (8)	Sabonis, Matthews (5)	TD Garden; 18,624	0–2
3	April 19	Boston	L 96–104	Tyreke Evans (19)	Thaddeus Young (9)	Domantas Sabonis (6)	Bankers Life Fieldhouse; 17,923	0–3
4	April 21	Boston	L 106–110	Bojan Bogdanovic (23)	Thaddeus Young (9)	Darren Collison (5)	Bankers Life Fieldhouse; 17,923	0–4

2019 playoff schedule

== Player statistics ==
=== Regular season ===
Player	POS	GP	GS	MP	REB	AST	STL	BLK	PTS	MPG	RPG	APG	SPG	BPG	PPG
Cory Joseph	PG	82	9	2,063	279	321	94	22	537	25.2	3.4	3.9	1.1	.3	6.5
Bojan Bogdanović	SF	81	81	2,573	333	161	69	1	1,454	31.8	4.1	2.0	.9	.0	18.0
Thaddeus Young	PF	81	81	2,489	523	204	123	36	1,024	30.7	6.5	2.5	1.5	.4	12.6
Doug McDermott	SF	77	1	1,340	109	67	18	8	564	17.4	1.4	.9	.2	.1	7.3
Darren Collison	PG	76	76	2,143	232	459	110	9	853	28.2	3.1	6.0	1.4	.1	11.2
Myles Turner	C	74	74	2,119	531	115	60	199	984	28.6	7.2	1.6	.8	2.7	13.3
Domantas Sabonis	C	74	5	1,838	690	212	48	30	1,043	24.8	9.3	2.9	.6	.4	14.1
Tyreke Evans	SG	69	18	1,402	201	166	58	18	706	20.3	2.9	2.4	.8	.3	10.2
T. J. Leaf	PF	58	1	522	125	24	9	19	225	9.0	2.2	.4	.2	.3	3.9
Aaron Holiday	PG	50	0	646	67	87	21	13	294	12.9	1.3	1.7	.4	.3	5.9
Kyle O'Quinn	C	45	3	371	119	56	9	25	156	8.2	2.6	1.2	.2	.6	3.5
Victor Oladipo	SG	36	36	1,147	202	186	60	11	675	31.9	5.6	5.2	1.7	.3	18.8
Wesley Matthews^{†}	SG	23	23	725	65	55	20	4	251	31.5	2.8	2.4	.9	.2	10.9
Edmond Sumner	PG	23	2	210	24	10	12	5	66	9.1	1.0	.4	.5	.2	2.9
Alize Johnson	PF	14	0	64	19	1	1	3	13	4.6	1.4	.1	.1	.2	.9
Davon Reed	SG	10	0	47	6	3	1	0	12	4.7	.6	.3	.1	.0	1.2
Ike Anigbogu	C	3	0	6	3	1	0	1	0	2.0	1.0	.3	.0	.3	.0

- ^{†} Denotes player spent time with another team in the season. Stats reflect time with the Pacers only.

=== Playoffs ===
Player	POS	GP	GS	MP	REB	AST	STL	BLK	PTS	MPG	RPG	APG	SPG	BPG	PPG
Bojan Bogdanović	SF	4	4	148	23	11	8	0	72	37.0	5.8	2.8	2.0	.0	18.0
Thaddeus Young	PF	4	4	130	28	15	11	3	42	32.5	7.0	3.8	2.8	.8	10.5
Myles Turner	C	4	4	126	25	6	0	7	39	31.5	6.3	1.5	.0	1.8	9.8
Wesley Matthews	SG	4	4	119	10	8	3	1	28	29.8	2.5	2.0	.8	.3	7.0
Darren Collison	PG	4	4	117	12	16	2	0	48	29.3	3.0	4.0	.5	.0	12.0
Domantas Sabonis	C	4	0	96	29	16	3	1	34	24.0	7.3	4.0	.8	.3	8.5
Cory Joseph	PG	4	0	85	7	4	3	0	30	21.3	1.8	1.0	.8	.0	7.5
Tyreke Evans	SG	4	0	84	17	3	3	1	61	21.0	4.3	.8	.8	.3	15.3
Doug McDermott	SF	3	0	29	5	4	0	1	6	9.7	1.7	1.3	.0	.3	2.0
Aaron Holiday	PG	3	0	13	0	0	0	0	5	4.3	.0	.0	.0	.0	1.7
T. J. Leaf	PF	1	0	10	3	0	0	0	2	10.0	3.0	.0	.0	.0	2.0
Kyle O'Quinn	C	1	0	2	0	0	0	0	0	2.0	.0	.0	.0	.0	.0
Edmond Sumner	PG	1	0	2	2	0	0	0	0	2.0	2.0	.0	.0	.0	.0

== Transactions ==
=== Free agents ===
==== Re-signed ====
Player	Signed
Ben Moore	September 21, 2018

==== Additions ====
Player	Signed	Former Team
Tyreke Evans	July 6, 2018	Memphis Grizzlies
Doug McDermott	July 6, 2018	Dallas Mavericks
Kyle O'Quinn	July 9, 2018	New York Knicks
C. J. Wilcox	Two-way contract	Portland Trail Blazers
Omari Johnson	September 21, 2018	Memphis Grizzlies
Elijah Stewart	September 21, 2018	USC Trojans
Davon Reed	Two-way contract	Phoenix Suns
Stephan Hicks	January 20, 2019	Fort Wayne Mad Ants (G League)

==== Subtractions ====
Player	Reason	New Team
Lance Stephenson	Unrestricted free agent	Los Angeles Lakers
Al Jefferson	Waived	(China) Xinjiang Flying Tigers
Joe Young	Unrestricted free agent	(China) Nanjing Monkey King
Alex Poythress	Waived	Atlanta Hawks
C. J. Wilcox	Waived	Fort Wayne Mad Ants
