= 2018–19 Memphis Grizzlies season =

- Head coach: J. B. Bickerstaff
- General manager: Chris Wallace
- Owners: Robert Pera
- Arena: FedExForum

Results
- Record: 33–49 (.402)
- Place: Division: 3rd (Southwest); Conference: 12th (Western)
- Playoff finish: Did not qualify
- Stats at Basketball Reference

Local media
- Television: Fox Sports Tennessee; Fox Sports Southeast
- Radio: WMFS-FM

The 2018–19 Memphis Grizzlies season was the 24th season of the franchise in the NBA and its 18th in Memphis. On August 2, 2018, the Grizzlies introduced a new identity, retiring the look that has been in place since 2004–05.

On May 1, 2018, the Grizzlies named former interim coach J. B. Bickerstaff as the official head coach. On February 7, 2019, Marc Gasol was traded to the Toronto Raptors, after spending 11 years with the Grizzlies (his entire NBA career up until then). This was the first time since the 2007–08 that Gasol was not on the team. They improved their record from the previous season, but still ended with a losing record and missing the playoffs. On June 19, 2019, Mike Conley was traded to the Utah Jazz, ending his 12-year stint with the Grizzlies (his entire career up until that point).

== Draft ==
Round	Pick	Player	Position	Nationality	College/Club
1	4	Jaren Jackson Jr.	PF	United States	Michigan State
2	32	Jevon Carter	PG	United States	West Virginia

== Roster ==
2018–19 Memphis Grizzlies roster
Players

Pos.	No.	Player	Height	Weight	DOB	From
F	1	Kyle Anderson (injured)	6 ft 9 in (2.06 m)	230 lb (104 kg)	1993–09–20	UCLA
G	0	Avery Bradley (injured)	6 ft 2 in (1.88 m)	180 lb (82 kg)	1990–11–26	Texas
G/F	24	Dillon Brooks (injured)	6 ft 6 in (1.98 m)	220 lb (100 kg)	1996–01–22	Oregon
F	5	Bruno Caboclo	6 ft 9 in (2.06 m)	218 lb (99 kg)	1995–09–21	Brazil
G	3	Jevon Carter	6 ft 2 in (1.88 m)	196 lb (89 kg)	1995–09–14	West Virginia
G	11	Mike Conley	6 ft 1 in (1.85 m)	175 lb (79 kg)	1987–10–11	Ohio State
G	22	Tyler Dorsey	6 ft 5 in (1.96 m)	183 lb (83 kg)	1996–02–18	Oregon
G/F	7	Justin Holiday	6 ft 6 in (1.98 m)	181 lb (82 kg)	1989–04–05	Washington
F/C	13	Jaren Jackson (injured)	6 ft 11 in (2.11 m)	242 lb (110 kg)	1999–09–15	Michigan State
G/F	6	C. J. Miles (injured)	6 ft 6 in (1.98 m)	225 lb (102 kg)	1987–03–18	Skyline HS (TX)
C	55	Joakim Noah (injured)	6 ft 11 in (2.11 m)	230 lb (104 kg)	1985–02–25	Florida
F	25	Chandler Parsons	6 ft 10 in (2.08 m)	230 lb (104 kg)	1988–10–25	Florida
F	10	Ivan Rabb	6 ft 10 in (2.08 m)	220 lb (100 kg)	1997–02–04	California
C	17	Jonas Valančiūnas (injured)	7 ft 0 in (2.13 m)	265 lb (120 kg)	1992–05–06	Lithuania
G/F	4	Julian Washburn (TW)	6 ft 8 in (2.03 m)	209 lb (95 kg)	1991–12–18	UTEP
F	12	Yuta Watanabe (TW)	6 ft 9 in (2.06 m)	205 lb (93 kg)	1994–10–13	George Washington
G	2	Delon Wright	6 ft 5 in (1.96 m)	183 lb (83 kg)	1992–04–26	Utah
C	45	Tyler Zeller	7 ft 0 in (2.13 m)	255 lb (116 kg)	1990–01–17	North Carolina

Coaches
Head coach
- J. B. Bickerstaff
Assistant(s)
- Chad Forcier (associate HC)
- Greg Buckner
- Adam Mazarei
- Vitaly Potapenko
- Nick Van Exel
- Kevin Burleson (player development)
- J. J. Outlaw (player development)

Legend
- (DP) Unsigned draft pick
- (FA) Free agent
- (S) Suspended
- (GL) On assignment to G League affiliate
- (TW) Two-way affiliate player
- Injured

Roster
Updated: 2019–04–11

== Standings ==
=== Division ===
Southwest Division	W	L	PCT	GB	Home	Road	Div	GP
y – Houston Rockets	53	29	.646	–	31‍–‍10	22‍–‍19	10–6	82
x – San Antonio Spurs	48	34	.585	5.0	32‍–‍9	16‍–‍25	10–6	82
Memphis Grizzlies	33	49	.402	20.0	21‍–‍20	12‍–‍29	8–8	82
New Orleans Pelicans	33	49	.402	20.0	19‍–‍22	14‍–‍27	8–8	82
Dallas Mavericks	33	49	.402	20.0	24‍–‍17	9‍–‍32	4–12	82

=== Conference ===
Western Conference
#	Team	W	L	PCT	GB	GP
1	c – Golden State Warriors *	57	25	.695	–	82
2	y – Denver Nuggets *	54	28	.659	3.0	82
3	x – Portland Trail Blazers	53	29	.646	4.0	82
4	y – Houston Rockets *	53	29	.646	4.0	82
5	x – Utah Jazz	50	32	.610	7.0	82
6	x – Oklahoma City Thunder	49	33	.598	8.0	82
7	x – San Antonio Spurs	48	34	.585	9.0	82
8	x – Los Angeles Clippers	48	34	.585	9.0	82
9	Sacramento Kings	39	43	.476	18.0	82
10	Los Angeles Lakers	37	45	.451	20.0	82
11	Minnesota Timberwolves	36	46	.439	21.0	82
12	Memphis Grizzlies	33	49	.402	24.0	82
13	New Orleans Pelicans	33	49	.402	24.0	82
14	Dallas Mavericks	33	49	.402	24.0	82
15	Phoenix Suns	19	63	.232	38.0	82

== Game log ==
=== Preseason ===
2018 preseason game log
Total: 2–3 (Home: 2–1; Road: 0–2)
Preseason: 2–3 (home: 2–1; road: 0–2)

Game	Date	Team	Score	High points	High rebounds	High assists	Location Attendance	Record
1	October 2	@ Houston	L 115–131	Mike Conley Jr. (16)	JaMychal Green (8)	Marc Gasol (4)	Legacy Arena; 16,888	0–1
2	October 5	Atlanta	W 120–110	Marc Gasol (21)	JaMychal Green (9)	Conley Jr., Gasol, Green, Parsons, Selden (3)	FedExForum; 10,492	1–1
3	October 6	Indiana	W 109–104 (OT)	Jaren Jackson Jr. (18)	Ivan Rabb (12)	Wayne Selden (9)	FedExForum; 11,615	2–1
4	October 10	@ Orlando	L 86–102	Mike Conley Jr. (24)	Marc Gasol (9)	Marc Gasol (5)	Amway Center; 14,299	2–2
5	October 12	Houston	L 103–121	Jaren Jackson Jr. (18)	Marc Gasol (9)	Mike Conley Jr. (6)	FedExForum; 12,576	2–3

2018–19 season schedule

=== Regular season ===
2018–19 game log
Total: 33–49 (Home: 21–20; Road: 12–29)
October: 4–2 (home: 3–0; road: 1–2)

Game	Date	Team	Score	High points	High rebounds	High assists	Location Attendance	Record
1	October 17	@ Indiana	L 83–111	Marc Gasol (13)	Marc Gasol (6)	Gasol, Jackson Jr., Mack (3)	Bankers Life Fieldhouse; 17,923	0–1
2	October 19	Atlanta	W 131–117	Garrett Temple (30)	Gasol, Jackson Jr. (7)	Mike Conley Jr. (11)	FedExForum; 17,019	1–1
3	October 22	@ Utah	W 92–84	Mike Conley Jr. (23)	Marc Gasol (13)	Conley Jr., Gasol (4)	Vivint Smart Home Arena; 18,306	2–1
4	October 24	@ Sacramento	L 92–97	Mike Conley Jr. (27)	Marc Gasol (10)	Mike Conley Jr. (5)	Golden 1 Center; 14,198	2–2
5	October 27	Phoenix	W 117–96	Marc Gasol (19)	Marc Gasol (8)	Mike Conley Jr. (7)	FedExForum; 15,926	3–2
6	October 30	Washington	W 107–95	Garrett Temple (20)	Kyle Anderson (11)	Shelvin Mack (8)	FedExForum; 14,106	4–2

November : 9–6 (home: 4–3; road: 5–3)

Game	Date	Team	Score	High points	High rebounds	High assists	Location Attendance	Record
7	November 2	@ Utah	W 110–100	Mike Conley Jr. (28)	Marc Gasol (10)	Marc Gasol (7)	Vivint Smart Home Arena; 18,306	5–2
8	November 4	@ Phoenix	L 100–102	Shelvin Mack (21)	Marc Gasol (8)	Mike Conley Jr. (5)	Talking Stick Resort Arena; 13,074	5–3
9	November 5	@ Golden State	L 101–117	Dillon Brooks (18)	Marc Gasol (10)	Marc Gasol (9)	Oracle Arena; 19,596	5–4
10	November 7	Denver	W 89–87	Gasol, Jackson Jr. (20)	Marc Gasol (12)	Mike Conley Jr. (8)	FedExForum; 15,832	6–4
11	November 10	Philadelphia	W 112–106 (OT)	Mike Conley Jr. (32)	Kyle Anderson (13)	Conley Jr., Gasol (6)	FedExForum; 16,904	7–4
12	November 12	Utah	L 88–96	Mike Conley Jr. (24)	Kyle Anderson (13)	Kyle Anderson (5)	FedExForum; 13,477	7–5
13	November 14	@ Milwaukee	W 116–113	Marc Gasol (29)	Kyle Anderson (8)	Shelvin Mack (5)	Fiserv Forum; 16,817	8–5
14	November 16	Sacramento	W 112–104	Jaren Jackson Jr. (27)	Marc Gasol (15)	Shelvin Mack (8)	FedExForum; 13,811	9–5
15	November 18	@ Minnesota	W 100–87	Marc Gasol (26)	Marc Gasol (13)	Mike Conley Jr. (8)	Target Center; 13,179	10–5
16	November 19	Dallas	W 98–88	Mike Conley Jr. (28)	Marc Gasol (15)	Mike Conley Jr. (7)	FedExForum; 15,997	11–5
17	November 21	@ San Antonio	W 104–103	Mike Conley Jr. (30)	Marc Gasol (10)	Mike Conley Jr. (9)	AT&T Center; 18,354	12–5
18	November 23	@ LA Clippers	L 107–112 (OT)	Marc Gasol (27)	Marc Gasol (13)	Mike Conley Jr. (11)	Staples Center; 15,418	12–6
19	November 25	NY Knicks	L 98–103	Marc Gasol (27)	Marc Gasol (8)	Mike Conley Jr. (11)	FedExForum; 14,331	12–7
20	November 27	Toronto	L 114–122	Marc Gasol (27)	JaMychal Green (7)	Mike Conley Jr. (6)	FedExForum; 14,187	12–8
21	November 30	@ Brooklyn	W 131–125 (2OT)	Mike Conley Jr. (37)	Marc Gasol (15)	Mike Conley Jr. (10)	Barclays Center; 12,983	13–8

December : 5–10 (home: 3–4; road: 2–6)

Game	Date	Team	Score	High points	High rebounds	High assists	Location Attendance	Record
22	December 2	@ Philadelphia	L 95–103	Mike Conley Jr. (21)	Omri Casspi (8)	Conley Jr., Anderson (5)	Wells Fargo Center; 20,334	13–9
23	December 5	LA Clippers	W 96–86	Mike Conley Jr. (22)	JaMychal Green (11)	Kyle Anderson (6)	FedExForum; 14,144	14–9
24	December 7	@ New Orleans	W 107–103	JaMychal Green (23)	Kyle Anderson (11)	Mike Conley Jr. (10)	Smoothie King Center; 18,447	15–9
25	December 8	LA Lakers	L 88–111	Wayne Selden (17)	Jaren Jackson Jr. (8)	Anderson, Selden (4)	FedExForum; 17,794	15–10
26	December 10	@ Denver	L 99–105	Mike Conley Jr. (19)	JaMychal Green (10)	Conley Jr., Gasol (6)	Pepsi Center; 15,278	15–11
27	December 12	Portland	W 92–83	Mike Conley Jr. (23)	Kyle Anderson (12)	Mike Conley Jr. (6)	FedExForum; 16,282	16–11
28	December 14	Miami	L 97–100	Mike Conley Jr. (22)	Marc Gasol (8)	Mike Conley Jr. (8)	FedExForum; 16,313	16–12
29	December 15	Houston	L 97–105	Mike Conley Jr. (22)	Marc Gasol (9)	Mike Conley Jr. (6)	FedExForum; 16,777	16–13
30	December 17	@ Golden State	L 93–110	Omri Casspi (20)	Casspi, Gasol (6)	Marc Gasol (6)	Oracle Arena; 19,596	16–14
31	December 19	@ Portland	L 92–99	Mike Conley Jr. (23)	Marc Gasol (9)	Mike Conley Jr. (6)	Moda Center; 19,412	16–15
32	December 21	@ Sacramento	L 99–102	Mike Conley Jr. (23)	JaMychal Green (9)	Conley Jr., Gasol (5)	Golden 1 Center; 16,369	16–16
33	December 23	@ LA Lakers	W 105–99	Jaren Jackson Jr. (27)	Gasol, Jackson Jr. (9)	Conley Jr., Gasol (8)	Staples Center; 18,997	17–16
34	December 26	Cleveland	W 95–87	Marc Gasol (20)	Marc Gasol (9)	Mike Conley (8)	FedExForum; 16,424	18–16
35	December 29	Boston	L 103–112	Mike Conley Jr. (26)	JaMychal Green (9)	Marc Gasol (10)	FedExForum; 17,794	18–17
36	December 31	@ Houston	L 101–113	Kyle Anderson (20)	Marc Gasol (12)	Anderson, Conley Jr. (5)	Toyota Center; 18,055	18–18

January : 2–14 (home: 2–7; road: 0–7)

Game	Date	Team	Score	High points	High rebounds	High assists	Location Attendance	Record
37	January 2	Detroit	L 94–101	Jaren Jackson Jr. (26)	Jaren Jackson Jr. (10)	Shelvin Mack (6)	FedExForum; 14,109	18–19
38	January 4	Brooklyn	L 100–109	Mike Conley Jr. (31)	Kyle Anderson (11)	Kyle Anderson (10)	FedExForum; 16,683	18–20
39	January 5	@ San Antonio	L 88–108	Mike Conley Jr. (21)	Marc Gasol (11)	Marc Gasol (6)	AT&T Center; 18,354	18–21
40	January 7	@ New Orleans	L 95–114	Mike Conley Jr. (22)	Joakim Noah (8)	Mike Conley Jr. (10)	Smoothie King Center; 14,624	18–22
41	January 9	San Antonio	W 96–86	Marc Gasol (26)	Marc Gasol (14)	Shelvin Mack (7)	FedExForum; 13,944	19–22
42	January 12	@ Miami	L 108–112	JaMychal Green (24)	JaMychal Green (11)	Mike Conley Jr. (7)	American Airlines Arena; 19,600	19–23
43	January 14	@ Houston	L 94–112	Temple, Conley (14)	Gasol, Conley (7)	Mike Conley Jr. (7)	Toyota Center; 18,055	19–24
44	January 16	Milwaukee	L 101–111	Omri Casspi (17)	JaMychal Green (10)	Shelvin Mack (6)	FedExForum; 14,921	19–25
45	January 18	@ Boston	L 116–122	Mike Conley Jr. (26)	Marc Gasol (11)	Marc Gasol (12)	TD Garden; 18,624	19–26
46	January 19	@ Toronto	L 90–119	Jaren Jackson Jr. (16)	Ivan Rabb (11)	Shelvin Mack (5)	Scotiabank Arena; 19,800	19–27
47	January 21	New Orleans	L 85–105	Marc Gasol (22)	Marc Gasol (8)	Mike Conley Jr. (8)	FedExForum; 17,794	19–28
48	January 23	Charlotte	L 107–118	Mike Conley Jr. (31)	Marc Gasol (17)	Marc Gasol (10)	FedExForum; 12,863	19–29
49	January 25	Sacramento	L 96–99	Omri Casspi (18)	Marc Gasol (10)	Mike Conley Jr. (9)	FedExForum; 14,486	19–30
50	January 26	Indiana	W 106–103	Mike Conley Jr. (22)	Marc Gasol (7)	Mike Conley Jr. (11)	FedExForum; 14,486	20–30
51	January 28	Denver	L 92–95	Marc Gasol (28)	Marc Gasol (9)	Mike Conley Jr. (7)	FedExForum; 12,917	20–31
52	January 30	@ Minnesota	L 97–99 (OT)	Mike Conley Jr. (26)	Ivan Rabb (10)	Mike Conley Jr. (8)	Target Center; 13,615	20–32

February : 4–7 (home: 3–3; road: 1–4)

Game	Date	Team	Score	High points	High rebounds	High assists	Location Attendance	Record
53	February 1	@ Charlotte	L 92–100	Shelvin Mack (19)	Joakim Noah (11)	Shelvin Mack (9)	Spectrum Center; 15,387	20–33
54	February 3	@ N. Y. Knicks	W 96–84	Mike Conley Jr. (25)	Marc Gasol (9)	Mike Conley Jr. (7)	Madison Square Garden; 17,025	21–33
55	February 5	Minnesota	W 108–106	Mike Conley Jr. (25)	Ivan Rabb (11)	Mike Conley Jr. (9)	FedExForum; 13,454	22–33
56	February 7	@ Oklahoma City	L 95–117	Jaren Jackson Jr. (27)	Ivan Rabb (9)	Mike Conley Jr. (7)	Chesapeake Energy Arena; 18,203	22–34
57	February 9	New Orleans	W 99–90	Joakim Noah (19)	Joakim Noah (14)	Mike Conley Jr. (9)	FedExForum; 16,841	23–34
58	February 12	San Antonio	L 107–108	Avery Bradley (33)	Jonas Valančiūnas (10)	Bradley, Wright (6)	FedExForum; 13,788	23–35
59	February 13	@ Chicago	L 110–122	Avery Bradley (15)	Jonas Valančiūnas (7)	Bradley, Conley Jr., Valančiūnas, Wright (5)	United Center; 19,114	23–36
60	February 22	L. A. Clippers	L 106–112	Mike Conley Jr. (25)	Joakim Noah (11)	Mike Conley Jr. (10)	FedExForum; 16,444	23–37
61	February 23	@ Cleveland	L 107–112	Jonas Valančiūnas (25)	Jonas Valančiūnas (11)	Noah, Rabb (4)	Quicken Loans Arena; 19,432	23–38
62	February 25	L. A. Lakers	W 110–105	Mike Conley Jr. (30)	Jonas Valančiūnas (13)	Mike Conley Jr. (5)	FedExForum; 17,794	24–38
63	February 27	Chicago	L 107–109	Avery Bradley (23)	Joakim Noah (9)	Avery Bradley (7)	FedExForum; 13,711	24–39

March : 7–7 (home: 5–2; road: 2–5)

Game	Date	Team	Score	High points	High rebounds	High assists	Location Attendance	Record
64	March 2	@ Dallas	W 111–81	Jonas Valančiūnas (20)	Bruno Caboclo (11)	Bruno Caboclo (6)	American Airlines Center; 20,233	25–39
65	March 3	@ Oklahoma City	L 95–99	Avery Bradley (27)	Jonas Valančiūnas (13)	Avery Bradley (7)	Chesapeake Energy Arena; 18,203	25–40
66	March 5	Portland	W 120–111	Mike Conley Jr. (30)	Joakim Noah (10)	Joakim Noah (7)	FedExForum; 13,801	26–40
67	March 8	Utah	W 114–104	Mike Conley Jr. (28)	Joakim Noah (11)	Mike Conley Jr. (8)	FedExForum; 15,407	27–40
68	March 10	Orlando	W 105–97	Mike Conley Jr. (26)	Jonas Valančiūnas (8)	Mike Conley Jr. (8)	FedExForum; 16,627	28–40
69	March 13	@ Atlanta	L 111–132	Mike Conley Jr. (20)	Joakim Noah (8)	Mike Conley Jr. (7)	State Farm Arena; 15,169	28–41
70	March 16	@ Washington	L 128–135	Mike Conley Jr. (28)	Jonas Valančiūnas (8)	Mike Conley Jr. (12)	Capital One Arena; 19,750	28–42
71	March 20	Houston	W 126–125 (OT)	Mike Conley Jr. (35)	Jonas Valančiūnas (15)	Mike Conley Jr. (8)	FedExForum; 16,691	29–42
72	March 22	@ Orlando	L 119–123 (OT)	Tyler Dorsey (29)	Jonas Valančiūnas (24)	Tyler Dorsey (9)	Amway Center; 18,025	29–43
73	March 23	Minnesota	L 99–112	Mike Conley Jr. (23)	Jonas Valančiūnas (14)	Delon Wright (6)	FedExForum; 16,977	29–44
74	March 25	Oklahoma City	W 115–103	Bruno Caboclo (24)	Jonas Valančiūnas (14)	Delon Wright (13)	FedExForum; 15,144	30–44
75	March 27	Golden State	L 103–118	Jonas Valančiūnas (27)	Valanciunas, Caboclo (13)	Mike Conley Jr. (8)	FedExForum; 17,794	30–45
76	March 30	@ Phoenix	W 120–115	Mike Conley Jr. (33)	Jonas Valančiūnas (20)	Conley Jr., Valančiūnas, Dorsey (5)	Talking Stick Resort Arena; 16,647	31–45
77	March 31	@ L. A. Clippers	L 96–113	Delon Wright (20)	Delon Wright (8)	Delon Wright (4)	Staples Center; 16,740	31–46

April : 2–3 (home: 1–1; road: 1–2)

Game	Date	Team	Score	High points	High rebounds	High assists	Location Attendance	Record
78	April 3	@ Portland	L 89–116	Chandler Parsons (16)	Ivan Rabb (10)	Delon Wright (6)	Moda Center; 19,608	31–47
79	April 5	@ Dallas	W 122–112	Delon Wright (26)	Delon Wright (10)	Delon Wright (14)	American Airlines Center; 20,111	32–47
80	April 7	Dallas	L 127–129 (OT)	Justin Holiday (30)	Bruno Caboclo (17)	Delon Wright (12)	FedExForum; 16,744	32–48
81	April 9	@ Detroit	L 93–100	Caboclo, Wright (15)	Ivan Rabb (10)	Zeller, Dorsey (3)	Little Caesars Arena; 19,802	32–49
82	April 10	Golden State	W 132–117	Jevon Carter (32)	Delon Wright (11)	Delon Wright (11)	FedExForum; 17,794	33–49

2018–19 season schedule

== Player statistics ==
=== Regular season ===
Player	POS	GP	GS	MP	REB	AST	STL	BLK	PTS	MPG	RPG	APG	SPG	BPG	PPG
Mike Conley Jr.	PG	70	70	2,342	239	449	94	22	1,478	33.5	3.4	6.4	1.3	.3	21.1
Jaren Jackson Jr.	PF	58	56	1,515	272	64	52	82	798	26.1	4.7	1.1	.9	1.4	13.8
Marc Gasol^{†}	C	53	53	1,788	455	248	60	63	834	33.7	8.6	4.7	1.1	1.2	15.7
Shelvin Mack^{†}	PG	53	3	1,204	102	182	45	4	421	22.7	1.9	3.4	.8	.1	7.9
Garrett Temple^{†}	SG	49	49	1,530	152	69	50	25	463	31.2	3.1	1.4	1.0	.5	9.4
Ivan Rabb	PF	49	13	721	206	54	17	14	284	14.7	4.2	1.1	.3	.3	5.8
Justin Holiday^{†}	SG	44	39	1,282	154	61	54	15	417	29.1	3.5	1.4	1.2	.3	9.5
Kyle Anderson	SF	43	40	1,281	251	128	54	37	346	29.8	5.8	3.0	1.3	.9	8.0
Joakim Noah	C	42	1	693	238	89	20	31	298	16.5	5.7	2.1	.5	.7	7.1
JaMychal Green^{†}	PF	41	4	900	252	36	33	26	403	22.0	6.1	.9	.8	.6	9.8
Jevon Carter	PG	39	3	577	66	69	26	11	172	14.8	1.7	1.8	.7	.3	4.4
Omri Casspi	SF	36	0	520	115	26	20	9	226	14.4	3.2	.7	.6	.3	6.3
Bruno Caboclo	PF	34	19	800	158	50	14	33	282	23.5	4.6	1.5	.4	1.0	8.3
Wayne Selden Jr.^{†}	SG	32	0	455	44	36	10	6	172	14.2	1.4	1.1	.3	.2	5.4
MarShon Brooks	SG	29	0	387	45	25	9	4	190	13.3	1.6	.9	.3	.1	6.6
Delon Wright^{†}	PG	26	11	802	141	138	42	15	316	30.8	5.4	5.3	1.6	.6	12.2
Chandler Parsons	SF	25	3	496	70	43	19	5	187	19.8	2.8	1.7	.8	.2	7.5
Tyler Dorsey^{†}	SG	21	11	447	70	39	7	1	206	21.3	3.3	1.9	.3	.0	9.8
Jonas Valančiūnas^{†}	C	19	17	527	203	41	6	30	379	27.7	10.7	2.2	.3	1.6	19.9
Julian Washburn	SF	18	3	254	41	14	13	2	40	14.1	2.3	.8	.7	.1	2.2
Dillon Brooks	SF	18	0	330	31	16	10	4	135	18.3	1.7	.9	.6	.2	7.5
Yuta Watanabe	SF	15	0	174	31	8	4	1	39	11.6	2.1	.5	.3	.1	2.6
Avery Bradley^{†}	SG	14	14	442	44	56	14	0	225	31.6	3.1	4.0	1.0	.0	16.1
C. J. Miles^{†}	SF	13	0	294	27	14	8	5	121	22.6	2.1	1.1	.6	.4	9.3
Tyler Zeller^{†}	C	4	1	82	18	3	1	3	46	20.5	4.5	.8	.3	.8	11.5
Dusty Hannahs	SG	2	0	26	1	5	1	0	8	13.0	.5	2.5	.5	.0	4.0
D. J. Stephens	SG	1	0	7	0	0	1	0	2	7.0	.0	.0	1.0	.0	2.0
Andrew Harrison^{†}	PG	1	0	5	0	0	0	0	2	5.0	.0	.0	.0	.0	2.0

- ^{†} Denotes player spent time with another team in the season. Stats reflect time with the Grizzlies only.

== Transactions ==
=== Trades ===
July 17, 2018	To Memphis Grizzlies Garrett Temple	To Sacramento Kings Deyonta Davis; Ben McLemore; 2021 Memphis second-round pick Cash considerations
July 23, 2018	To Memphis Grizzlies Dakari Johnson	To Orlando Magic Jarell Martin; Cash considerations
January 3, 2019	To Memphis Grizzlies Justin Holiday	To Chicago Bulls MarShon Brooks; Wayne Selden Jr. 2019 Memphis second-round pick 2020 Memphis second-round pick Cash considerations
February 7, 2019	To Memphis Grizzlies Jonas Valančiūnas; Delon Wright; CJ Miles a 2024 2nd-round draft pick	To Toronto Raptors Marc Gasol
February 7, 2019	To Memphis Grizzlies Tyler Dorsey	To Atlanta Hawks Shelvin Mack
February 7, 2019	To Memphis Grizzlies Avery Bradley	To Los Angeles Clippers JaMychal Green Garrett Temple

=== Free agency ===
==== Additions ====
Player	Signed	Former team
Kyle Anderson	4-year contract worth $32.7 million	San Antonio Spurs
Omri Casspi	July 11, 2018	Golden State Warriors
Yuta Watanabe	Two-way contract	George Washington Colonials
Shelvin Mack	August 7, 2018	Orlando Magic
Markel Crawford	August 16, 2018	Ole Miss Rebels
Doral Moore	August 30, 2018	Wake Forest Demon Deacons
Brandon Goodwin	September 4, 2018	Florida Gulf Coast Eagles
Ismaila Kane	September 24, 2018	Atlanta Metropolitan Trailblazers
D. J. Stephens	Two-way contract	(France) Le Mans Sarthe Basket

==== Subtractions ====
Player	Reason left	New team
Omari Johnson	Waived	Fort Wayne Mad Ants
Tyreke Evans	Free agency	Indiana Pacers
Myke Henry	Waived	(Israel) Ironi Nahariya
Brianté Weber	Free agency	Miami Heat
Marc Gasol	Traded	Toronto Raptors
