= Tyler Lydon =

American basketball player (born 1996)

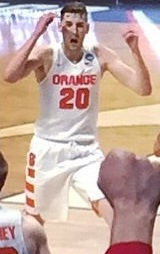
- Lydon playing for Syracuse

Personal information
- Born: April 9, 1996 (age 30) Hudson, New York, U.S.
- Listed height: 6 ft 10 in (2.08 m)
- Listed weight: 225 lb (102 kg)

Career information
- High school: Stissing Mountain (Pine Plains, New York); New Hampton School (New Hampton, New Hampshire)
- College: Syracuse (2015–2017)
- NBA draft: 2017: 1st round, 24th overall pick
- Drafted by: Utah Jazz
- Playing career: 2017–2021
- Position: Power forward

Career history
- 2017–2019: Denver Nuggets
- 2017: →Rio Grande Valley Vipers
- 2019: →Capital City Go-Go
- Stats at NBA.com
- Stats at Basketball Reference
Medals
Representing United States
FIBA Americas U18 Championship
Gold medal – first place	2014 United States	National team

Tyler Robert Lydon (born April 9, 1996) is an American former professional basketball player. He played college basketball for the Syracuse Orange.

== Early life ==
Lydon attended Stissing Mountain High School in Pine Plains, New York, then spent two years at New Hampton School in New Hampton, New Hampshire. In 2014, he represented the United States at the FIBA Americas Under-18 Championship in Colorado Springs. He led the team in rebounds despite not starting any games en route to a gold medal. Lydon committed to Syracuse University to play college basketball.

== College career ==
As a freshman at Syracuse, Lydon averaged 10.1 points, 6.3 rebounds and 1.8 blocks per game. As a sophomore, he averaged 13.2 points, 8.6 rebounds and 1.4 blocks per game. After the season, he entered the 2017 NBA draft.

== Professional career ==
=== Denver Nuggets (2017–2019) ===
In the 2017 NBA draft, Lydon was selected by the Utah Jazz with the 24th pick in the first round, and was subsequently traded to the Denver Nuggets shortly after being selected as a part of the deal for Donovan Mitchell. Lydon was assigned to the Rio Grande Valley Vipers of the NBA G League on October 23, 2017, before being recalled back to the Nuggets on November 8. On March 3, 2019, Lydon was assigned to the Capital City Go-Go. The Nuggets declined to pick up the third year option for Lydon's contract for the 2019–20 season, making him an unrestricted free agent.

On July 17, 2019, Lydon signed with the Sacramento Kings. On October 21, 2019, the Sacramento Kings announced that they had waived Lydon.

In July 2021, Lydon participated in The Basketball Tournament. He played for the Boeheim's Army and won the winner-take-all $1 million prize. He also indicated that he would retire as a basketball player after the tournament.

== Career statistics ==
Legend
GP	Games played	GS	Games started	MPG	Minutes per game
FG%	Field goal percentage	3P%	3-point field goal percentage	FT%	Free throw percentage
RPG	Rebounds per game	APG	Assists per game	SPG	Steals per game
BPG	Blocks per game	PPG	Points per game	**Bold**	Career high

=== NBA ===
==== Regular season ====
Year	Team	GP	GS	MPG	FG%	3P%	FT%	RPG	APG	SPG	BPG	PPG
2017–18	Denver	1	0	2.0	–	–	–	.0	.0	.0	.0	.0
2018–19	Denver	**25**	0	**3.8**	**.500**	**.400**	**.333**	**.7**	**.2**	**.1**	.0	**.9**
Career		26	0	3.7	.500	.400	.333	.7	.2	.1	.0	.9

=== NBA G League ===
==== Regular season ====
Year	Team	GP	GS	MPG	FG%	3P%	FT%	RPG	APG	SPG	BPG	PPG
2017–18	Rio Grande Valley	**15**	**13**	31.3	**.529**	**.377**	**.737**	8.3	2.1	**1.1**	**.5**	12.8
2018–19	Capital City	8	7	**33.5**	.460	.354	.600	**9.1**	**2.5**	.8	**.5**	**13.3**
Career		23	20	32.1	.502	.368	.676	8.6	2.2	1.0	.5	12.9

=== College ===
Year	Team	GP	GS	MPG	FG%	3P%	FT%	RPG	APG	SPG	BPG	PPG
2015–16	Syracuse	**37**	0	30.3	**.479**	**.405**	.774	6.3	1.1	**1.1**	**1.8**	10.1
2016–17	Syracuse	34	**34**	**36.1**	.473	.395	**.836**	**8.6**	**2.1**	1.0	1.4	**13.2**
Career		71	34	33.1	.476	.400	.809	7.4	1.6	1.1	1.6	11.6
