= 2018–19 New Orleans Pelicans season =

- Head coach: Alvin Gentry
- General manager: Dell Demps (Until February 15); Danny Ferry (interim)
- Owner: Gayle Benson
- Arena: Smoothie King Center

Results
- Record: 33–49 (.402)
- Place: Division: 4th (Southwest); Conference: 13th (Western)
- Playoff finish: Did not qualify
- Stats at Basketball Reference

Local media
- Television: Fox Sports New Orleans
- Radio: WWL-FM

The 2018–19 New Orleans Pelicans season was the 17th season of the New Orleans Pelicans franchise in the National Basketball Association (NBA).

This season also marked the highest number of points scored in a game for the New Orleans franchise, with a franchise-high 149 points scored in their second game of the season on an October 19, 2018 win over the Sacramento Kings. However, the season also produced plenty of turmoil for the team through the surprising departure of DeMarcus Cousins to the Golden State Warriors in free agency, Anthony Davis announcing trade demands that ultimately were not met during this season, and the firing of general manager Dell Demps during the 2019 NBA All-Star Weekend. All of this would lead the Pelicans to another losing season with Davis on the team, with a 138–136 overtime loss to the Phoenix Suns on March 16, ultimately eliminating them from playoff contention.

On May 14, 2019, after the conclusion of this season, the Pelicans won the top draft choice, making it the second time they won the lottery.

Also, this season marked the end of the Anthony Davis era in New Orleans, as he was traded to the Los Angeles Lakers on July 6, 2019.

== Draft ==
Round	Pick	Player	Position	Nationality	College / Club
2	51	Tony Carr	PG	United States	Penn State

== Roster ==
2018–19 New Orleans Pelicans roster
Players

Pos.	No.	Player	Height	Weight	DOB	From
SG	9	Dairis Bertāns	6 ft 4 in (1.93 m)	200 lb (91 kg)	1989-09-09	Latvia
SG	2	Ian Clark	6 ft 3 in (1.91 m)	175 lb (79 kg)	1991-03-07	Belmont
PF	23	Anthony Davis	6 ft 10 in (2.08 m)	253 lb (115 kg)	1993-03-11	Kentucky
PF	13	Cheick Diallo	6 ft 9 in (2.06 m)	220 lb (100 kg)	1996-09-13	Kansas
SF	44	Solomon Hill	6 ft 7 in (2.01 m)	225 lb (102 kg)	1991-03-18	Arizona
SG	11	Jrue Holiday	6 ft 4 in (1.93 m)	205 lb (93 kg)	1990-06-12	UCLA
PG	15	Frank Jackson	6 ft 3 in (1.91 m)	205 lb (93 kg)	1998-05-04	Duke
SF	3	Stanley Johnson	6 ft 7 in (2.01 m)	245 lb (111 kg)	1996-05-29	Arizona
SF	21	Darius Miller	6 ft 8 in (2.03 m)	225 lb (102 kg)	1990-03-21	Kentucky
SG	55	E'Twaun Moore	6 ft 4 in (1.93 m)	191 lb (87 kg)	1989-02-25	Purdue
C	8	Jahlil Okafor	6 ft 10 in (2.08 m)	275 lb (125 kg)	1995-12-15	Duke
PG	4	Elfrid Payton	6 ft 4 in (1.93 m)	185 lb (84 kg)	1994-02-22	Louisiana
PF	30	Julius Randle	6 ft 8 in (2.03 m)	250 lb (113 kg)	1994-11-29	Kentucky
SF	34	Kenrich Williams	6 ft 7 in (2.01 m)	210 lb (95 kg)	1994-12-02	TCU
PF	35	Christian Wood	6 ft 10 in (2.08 m)	214 lb (97 kg)	1995-09-27	UNLV

Coaches
Head coach
- Alvin Gentry
Assistant(s)
- Darren Erman (associate HC)
- Chris Finch
- Kevin Hanson
- Fred Vinson
- Joe Boylan (player development)
- Mike Penberthy (player development)
- Jason Sumerlin (strength and conditioning)
- Jon Ishop (trainer)
- Todd Campbell (trainer)

Legend
- (DP) Unsigned draft pick
- (FA) Free agent
- (S) Suspended
- (GL) On assignment to G League affiliate
- (TW) Two-way affiliate player
- Injured

Roster
Updated: March 20, 2019

== Standings ==
=== Division ===
Southwest Division	W	L	PCT	GB	Home	Road	Div	GP
y – Houston Rockets	53	29	.646	–	31‍–‍10	22‍–‍19	10–6	82
x – San Antonio Spurs	48	34	.585	5.0	32‍–‍9	16‍–‍25	10–6	82
Memphis Grizzlies	33	49	.402	20.0	21‍–‍20	12‍–‍29	8–8	82
New Orleans Pelicans	33	49	.402	20.0	19‍–‍22	14‍–‍27	8–8	82
Dallas Mavericks	33	49	.402	20.0	24‍–‍17	9‍–‍32	4–12	82

=== Conference ===
Western Conference
#	Team	W	L	PCT	GB	GP
1	c – Golden State Warriors *	57	25	.695	–	82
2	y – Denver Nuggets *	54	28	.659	3.0	82
3	x – Portland Trail Blazers	53	29	.646	4.0	82
4	y – Houston Rockets *	53	29	.646	4.0	82
5	x – Utah Jazz	50	32	.610	7.0	82
6	x – Oklahoma City Thunder	49	33	.598	8.0	82
7	x – San Antonio Spurs	48	34	.585	9.0	82
8	x – Los Angeles Clippers	48	34	.585	9.0	82
9	Sacramento Kings	39	43	.476	18.0	82
10	Los Angeles Lakers	37	45	.451	20.0	82
11	Minnesota Timberwolves	36	46	.439	21.0	82
12	Memphis Grizzlies	33	49	.402	24.0	82
13	New Orleans Pelicans	33	49	.402	24.0	82
14	Dallas Mavericks	33	49	.402	24.0	82
15	Phoenix Suns	19	63	.232	38.0	82

== Game log ==
=== Preseason ===
2018 preseason game log
Total: 0–5 (Home: 0–1; Road: 0–4)
Preseason: 0–5 (home: 0–1; road: 0–4)

Game	Date	Team	Score	High points	High rebounds	High assists	Location Attendance	Record
1	September 30	@ Chicago	L 116–128	Holiday, Jackson (16)	Payton (8)	Randle (5)	United Center; 17,861	0–1
2	October 1	@ Atlanta	L 102–116	Davis (16)	McCoy (8)	Payton (7)	McCamish Pavilion; 6,619	0–2
3	October 5	@ New York	L 100–106	Mirotic (19)	Davis (13)	Payton (7)	Madison Square Garden; 17,162	0–3
4	October 10	@ Miami	L 128–140	Randle (23)	Diallo (8)	Payton (8)	American Airlines Arena; 19,600	0–4
5	October 11	Toronto	L 119–134	Davis (36)	Davis (15)	Holiday (8)	Smoothie King Center; 15,047	0–5

2018–19 season schedule

=== Regular season ===
2018–19 game log
Total: 33–49 (Home: 19–22; Road: 14–27)
October: 4–3 (home: 3–1; road: 1–2)

Game	Date	Team	Score	High points	High rebounds	High assists	Location Attendance	Record
1	October 17	@ Houston	W 131–112	Anthony Davis (32)	Anthony Davis (16)	Elfrid Payton (10)	Toyota Center; 18,055	1–0
2	October 19	Sacramento	W 149–129	Nikola Mirotic (36)	Anthony Davis (10)	Jrue Holiday (10)	Smoothie King Center; 18,337	2–0
3	October 23	LA Clippers	W 116–109	Anthony Davis (34)	Anthony Davis (13)	Jrue Holiday (9)	Smoothie King Center; 14,625	3–0
4	October 26	Brooklyn	W 117–115	Jrue Holiday (26)	Anthony Davis (14)	Elfrid Payton (6)	Smoothie King Center; 15,272	4–0
5	October 27	Utah	L 111–132	Nikola Mirotic (25)	Nikola Mirotic (8)	Jrue Holiday (6)	Smoothie King Center; 16,373	4–1
6	October 29	@ Denver	L 111–116	Julius Randle (24)	Nikola Mirotic (10)	Jrue Holiday (9)	Pepsi Center; 15,217	4–2
7	October 31	@ Golden State	L 121–131	Jrue Holiday (28)	Davis, Mirotic (12)	Jrue Holiday (9)	Oracle Arena; 19,596	4–3

November : 7–9 (home: 6–1; road: 1–8)

Game	Date	Team	Score	High points	High rebounds	High assists	Location Attendance	Record
8	November 1	@ Portland	L 119–132	Julius Randle (29)	Nikola Mirotic (13)	Jrue Holiday (10)	Moda Center; 18,921	4–4
9	November 3	@ San Antonio	L 95–109	Jrue Holiday (29)	Nikola Mirotic (16)	Jrue Holiday (8)	AT&T Center; 18,354	4–5
10	November 5	@ Oklahoma City	L 116–122	Julius Randle (26)	Nikola Mirotic (16)	Jrue Holiday (14)	Chesapeake Energy Arena; 18,203	4–6
11	November 7	Chicago	W 107–98	Anthony Davis (32)	Davis, Mirotic (15)	Jrue Holiday (9)	Smoothie King Center; 15,514	5–6
12	November 10	Phoenix	W 119–99	Anthony Davis (26)	Julius Randle (16)	Jrue Holiday (9)	Smoothie King Center; 15,222	6–6
13	November 12	@ Toronto	W 126–110	E'Twaun Moore (30)	Anthony Davis (20)	Jrue Holiday (14)	Scotiabank Arena; 19,800	7–6
14	November 14	@ Minnesota	L 100–107	E'Twaun Moore (31)	Anthony Davis (11)	Jrue Holiday (10)	Target Center; 11,636	7–7
15	November 16	New York	W 129–124	Anthony Davis (43)	Anthony Davis (17)	Jrue Holiday (10)	Smoothie King Center; 14,717	8–7
16	November 17	Denver	W 125–115	Anthony Davis (40)	Randle, Mirotic (10)	Jrue Holiday, Davis (8)	Smoothie King Center; 15,408	9–7
17	November 19	San Antonio	W 140–126	Anthony Davis (29)	Julius Randle (14)	Julius Randle (10)	Smoothie King Center; 14,675	10–7
18	November 21	@ Philadelphia	L 120–121	Holiday, Moore (30)	Anthony Davis (16)	Jrue Holiday (10)	Wells Fargo Center; 20,352	10–8
19	November 23	@ New York	L 109–114	Anthony Davis (33)	Anthony Davis (12)	Jrue Holiday (8)	Madison Square Garden; 18,948	10–9
20	November 24	@ Washington	L 114–124	Julius Randle (29)	Julius Randle (15)	Jrue Holiday (9)	Capital One Arena; 15,165	10–10
21	November 26	Boston	L 107–124	Anthony Davis (27)	Anthony Davis (16)	Jrue Holiday (7)	Smoothie King Center; 15,189	10–11
22	November 28	Washington	W 125–104	Jrue Holiday (29)	Anthony Davis (15)	Tim Frazier (12)	Smoothie King Center; 13,570	11–11
23	November 30	@ Miami	L 101–106	Anthony Davis (41)	Julius Randle (10)	Tim Frazier (9)	AmericanAirlines Arena; 19,600	11–12

December : 6–9 (home: 4–4; road: 2–5)

Game	Date	Team	Score	High points	High rebounds	High assists	Location Attendance	Record
24	December 2	@ Charlotte	W 119–109	Anthony Davis (36)	Anthony Davis (19)	Tim Frazier (9)	Spectrum Center; 15,336	12–12
25	December 3	LA Clippers	L 126–129	Julius Randle (37)	Anthony Davis (13)	Jrue Holiday (14)	Smoothie King Center; 13,822	12–13
26	December 5	Dallas	W 132–106	Davis, Randle (27)	Julius Randle (18)	Anthony Davis (9)	Smoothie King Center; 14,810	13–13
27	December 7	Memphis	L 103–107	Julius Randle (26)	Julius Randle (13)	Jrue Holiday (11)	Smoothie King Center; 18,447	13–14
28	December 9	@ Detroit	W 116–108	Jrue Holiday (37)	Anthony Davis (9)	Tim Frazier (8)	Little Caesars Arena; 14,705	14–14
29	December 10	@ Boston	L 100–113	Anthony Davis (41)	Julius Randle (11)	Jrue Holiday (10)	TD Garden; 18,624	14–15
30	December 12	Oklahoma City	W 118–114	Anthony Davis (44)	Anthony Davis (18)	Jrue Holiday (10)	Smoothie King Center; 14,450	15–15
31	December 16	Miami	L 96–102	Anthony Davis (27)	Anthony Davis (12)	Anthony Davis (7)	Smoothie King Center; 15,535	15–16
32	December 19	@ Milwaukee	L 115–123	Anthony Davis (27)	Anthony Davis (11)	Jrue Holiday (12)	Fiserv Forum; 17,341	15–17
33	December 21	@ LA Lakers	L 104–112	Anthony Davis (30)	Anthony Davis (20)	Jrue Holiday (10)	Staples Center; 18,997	15–18
34	December 23	@ Sacramento	L 117–122	Jrue Holiday (27)	Anthony Davis (17)	Tim Frazier (7)	Golden 1 Center; 16,643	15–19
35	December 26	@ Dallas	L 119–122	Anthony Davis (32)	Anthony Davis (18)	Tim Frazier (7)	American Airlines Center; 16,643	15–20
36	December 28	Dallas	W 114–112	Anthony Davis (48)	Anthony Davis (17)	Jrue Holiday (8)	Smoothie King Center; 18,364	16–20
37	December 29	Houston	L 104–108	Julius Randle (23)	Davis, Randle (11)	Jrue Holiday (9)	Smoothie King Center; 17,555	16–21
38	December 31	Minnesota	W 123–114	Julius Randle (33)	Julius Randle (11)	Jrue Holiday (9)	Smoothie King Center; 14,904	17–21

January : 6–8 (home: 2–3; road: 4–5)

Game	Date	Team	Score	High points	High rebounds	High assists	Location Attendance	Record
39	January 2	@ Brooklyn	L 121–126	Anthony Davis (34)	Anthony Davis (26)	Jrue Holiday (7)	Barclays Center; 16,890	17–22
40	January 5	@ Cleveland	W 133–98	Holiday, Randle (22)	Julius Randle (12)	Julius Randle (8)	Quicken Loans Arena; 19,432	18–22
41	January 7	Memphis	W 114–95	Anthony Davis (36)	Anthony Davis (13)	Jrue Holiday (6)	Smoothie King Center; 14,624	19–22
42	January 9	Cleveland	W 140–124	Anthony Davis (38)	Anthony Davis (13)	Elfrid Payton (9)	Smoothie King Center; 15,058	20–22
43	January 12	@ Minnesota	L 106–110	Anthony Davis (30)	Anthony Davis (14)	Jrue Holiday (7)	Target Center; 16,384	20–23
44	January 14	@ LA Clippers	W 121–117	Anthony Davis (46)	Anthony Davis (16)	Jrue Holiday (8)	Staples Center; 15,283	21–23
45	January 16	@ Golden State	L 140–147	Anthony Davis (30)	Anthony Davis (18)	Elfrid Payton (12)	Oracle Arena; 19,596	21–24
46	January 18	@ Portland	L 112–128	Anthony Davis (27)	Julius Randle (9)	Jrue Holiday (6)	Moda Center; 19,598	21–25
47	January 21	@ Memphis	W 105–85	Jrue Holiday (21)	Julius Randle (12)	Jrue Holiday (6)	FedExForum; 17,794	22–25
48	January 23	Detroit	L 94–98	Jrue Holiday (29)	Julius Randle (13)	Jrue Holiday (7)	Smoothie King Center; 18,181	22–26
49	January 24	@ Oklahoma City	L 116–122	Jrue Holiday (22)	Jrue Holiday (9)	Jrue Holiday (13)	Chesapeake Energy Arena; 18,203	22–27
50	January 26	San Antonio	L 114–126	Jrue Holiday (29)	Jahlil Okafor (15)	Elfrid Payton (5)	Smoothie King Center; 17,724	22–28
51	January 29	@ Houston	W 121–116	Jahlil Okafor (27)	Jahlil Okafor (12)	Tim Frazier (10)	Toyota Center; 18,055	23–28
52	January 30	Denver	L 99–105	Jrue Holiday (22)	Okafor, Frazier, K.Williams (8)	Tim Frazier (8)	Smoothie King Center; 14,211	23–29

February : 4–7 (home: 3–3; road: 1–4)

Game	Date	Team	Score	High points	High rebounds	High assists	Location Attendance	Record
53	February 2	@ San Antonio	L 108–113	Frank Jackson (25)	Diallo, K.Williams (8)	Tim Frazier (8)	AT&T Center; 18,354	23–30
54	February 4	Indiana	L 107–109	Jahlil Okafor (25)	Cheick Diallo (14)	Jrue Holiday (9)	Smoothie King Center; 15,780	23–31
55	February 6	@ Chicago	W 125–120	Julius Randle (31)	Cheick Diallo (9)	Jrue Holiday (11)	United Center; 18,116	24–31
56	February 8	Minnesota	W 122–117	Anthony Davis (32)	Anthony Davis (9)	Jrue Holiday (9)	Smoothie King Center; 16,980	25–31
57	February 9	@ Memphis	L 90–99	Julius Randle (21)	Anthony Davis (16)	Kenrich Williams (7)	FedExForum; 16,841	25–32
58	February 12	Orlando	L 88–118	E'Twaun Moore (19)	Okafor, Williams (7)	Tim Frazier (7)	Smoothie King Center; 15,733	25–33
59	February 14	Oklahoma City	W 131–122	Julius Randle (33)	Kenrich Williams (12)	Jrue Holiday (7)	Smoothie King Center; 15,686	26–33
60	February 22	@ Indiana	L 111–126	Cheick Diallo (16)	Cheick Diallo (18)	Davis, Holiday, Payton, S. Johnson (4)	Bankers Life Fieldhouse; 16,962	26–34
61	February 23	LA Lakers	W 128–115	Jrue Holiday (27)	Cheick Diallo (10)	Elfrid Payton (9)	Smoothie King Center; 18,626	27–34
62	February 25	Philadelphia	L 110–111	Jrue Holiday (22)	Julius Randle (14)	Elfrid Payton (14)	Smoothie King Center; 17,194	27–35
63	February 27	@ LA Lakers	L 119–125	Julius Randle (35)	Elfrid Payton (11)	Jrue Holiday (10)	Staples Center; 18,997	27–36

March : 5–10 (home: 1–8; road: 4–2)

Game	Date	Team	Score	High points	High rebounds	High assists	Location Attendance	Record
64	March 1	@ Phoenix	W 130–116	Julius Randle (22)	Cheick Diallo (10)	Elfrid Payton (10)	Talking Stick Resort Arena; 14,123	28–36
65	March 2	@ Denver	W 120–112	Jrue Holiday (29)	Julius Randle (10)	Elfrid Payton (10)	Pepsi Center; 19,155	29–36
66	March 4	@ Utah	W 115–112	Holiday, Randle (30)	Anthony Davis (11)	Elfrid Payton (6)	Vivint Smart Home Arena; 18,306	30–36
67	March 6	Utah	L 104–114	Julius Randle (23)	Elfrid Payton (8)	Davis, Holiday, Randle, Payton (3)	Smoothie King Center; 14,681	30–37
68	March 8	Toronto	L 104–127	Frank Jackson (20)	Julius Randle (9)	Julius Randle (7)	Smoothie King Center; 17,325	30–38
69	March 10	@ Atlanta	L 116–128	Jackson, Randle (23)	Elfrid Payton (10)	Elfrid Payton (10)	State Farm Arena; 14,337	30–39
70	March 12	Milwaukee	L 113–130	Julius Randle (23)	Elfrid Payton (15)	Elfrid Payton (11)	Smoothie King Center; 15,562	30–40
71	March 15	Portland	L 110–122	Julius Randle (45)	Elfrid Payton (12)	Elfrid Payton (16)	Smoothie King Center; 16,177	30–41
72	March 16	Phoenix	L 136–138 (OT)	Julius Randle (21)	Elfrid Payton (13)	Elfrid Payton (16)	Smoothie King Center; 17,641	30–42
73	March 18	@ Dallas	W 129–125 (OT)	Julius Randle (30)	Kenrich Williams (11)	Elfrid Payton (11)	American Airlines Center; 20,276	31–42
74	March 20	@ Orlando	L 96–119	Stanley Johnson (18)	Cheick Diallo (11)	Clark, Jackson, Miller (4)	Amway Center; 17,005	31–43
75	March 24	Houston	L 90–113	Frank Jackson (19)	Anthony Davis (10)	Elfrid Payton (8)	Smoothie King Center; 17,048	31–44
76	March 26	Atlanta	L 120–130	Julius Randle (24)	Randle, Wood (9)	Elfrid Payton (9)	Smoothie King Center; 14,751	31–45
77	March 28	Sacramento	W 121–118	Julius Randle (34)	Julius Randle (10)	Elfrid Payton (9)	Smoothie King Center; 13,976	32–45
78	March 31	L. A. Lakers	L 102–130	Julius Randle (17)	Christian Wood (11)	Elfrid Payton (6)	Smoothie King Center; 18,562	32–46

April : 1–3 (home: 0–2; road: 1–1)

Game	Date	Team	Score	High points	High rebounds	High assists	Location Attendance	Record
79	April 3	Charlotte	L 109–115	Julius Randle (34)	Julius Randle (11)	Elfrid Payton (7)	Smoothie King Center; 16,844	32–47
80	April 5	@ Phoenix	L 126–133 (OT)	Julius Randle (31)	Julius Randle (14)	Elfrid Payton (12)	Talking Stick Resort Arena; 16,410	32–48
81	April 7	@ Sacramento	W 133–129	Ian Clark (31)	Jahlil Okafor (14)	Elfrid Payton (14)	Golden 1 Center; 17,583	33–48
82	April 9	Golden State	L 103–112	Jahlil Okafor (30)	Christian Wood (12)	Elfrid Payton (7)	Smoothie King Center; 17,090	33–49

2018–19 season schedule

== Player statistics ==
Player	Pos.	GP	GS	MP	Reb.	Ast.	Stl.	Blk.	Pts.
Dairis Bertāns^{≠}	SG	12	0	167	9	10	1	0	34
Ian Clark	SG	60	6	973	89	94	22	8	401
Anthony Davis	C	56	56	1,850	672	218	88	135	1,452
Cheick Diallo	PF	64	1	896	332	33	29	33	387
Tim Frazier^{‡}	PG	47	17	909	137	206	25	4	235
Andrew Harrison^{‡}	PG	6	0	38	5	7	0	0	9
Solomon Hill	SF	44	15	878	133	55	23	10	191
Jrue Holiday	SG	67	67	2,402	334	518	109	54	1,420
Frank Jackson	PG	61	16	1,169	134	69	25	2	495
Stanley Johnson	SF	18	0	247	42	28	12	1	96
Wesley Johnson^{†}	SF	26	13	377	54	16	12	7	95
Darius Miller	SF	69	15	1,757	128	146	40	23	567
Nikola Mirotić^{†}	PF	32	22	925	264	35	21	25	534
E'Twaun Moore	SG	53	36	1,463	127	102	40	8	633
Jahlil Okafor	C	59	24	935	278	40	15	40	484
Elfrid Payton	PG	42	42	1,250	220	320	44	17	446
Julius Randle	PF	73	49	2,232	634	229	52	45	1,565
Jason Smith^{‡}	C	2	0	20	4	1	0	0	8
Kenrich Williams	SF	46	29	1,079	219	83	45	19	279
Christian Wood	PF	8	2	189	63	6	7	10	13

After all games.
^{‡}Waived during the season
^{†}Traded during the season
^{≠}Acquired during the season

== Transactions ==
=== Trades ===
October 15, 2018	To New Orleans Pelicans Wesley Johnson	To Los Angeles Clippers Alexis Ajinça

=== Free agency ===
==== Re-signed ====
Player	Signed
Ian Clark	July 9, 2018

==== Additions ====
Player	Signed	Former team
Elfrid Payton	July 9, 2018	Phoenix Suns
Julius Randle	July 9, 2018	Los Angeles Lakers
Trevon Bluiett	July 17, 2018	Xavier Musketeers
Garlon Green	July 24, 2018	(Belgium) Belfius Mons-Hainaut
Kenrich Williams	July 24, 2018	Texas Christian University Horned Frogs
Troy Williams	July 27, 2018	New York Knicks
Jahlil Okafor	August 9, 2018	Brooklyn Nets
Darius Morris	September 4, 2018	Rio Grande Valley Vipers (G League)
Dairis Bertāns	March 2, 2019	(Italy) AX Armani Exchange Olimpia Milan

==== Subtractions ====
Player	Reason left	New team
DeMarcus Cousins	Free agency	Golden State Warriors
Rajon Rondo	Free agency	Los Angeles Lakers
Emeka Okafor	Waived	Philadelphia 76ers

== Awards, records and milestones ==
=== Awards ===
Player	Award	Date awarded	Ref.
Anthony Davis	Western Conference Player of the Week	November 19, 2018	
Anthony Davis	NBA All-Star (6th appearance)	January 31, 2019	
Jrue Holiday	NBA All-Defensive Second Team	May 22, 2019	

=== Records ===
- The Pelicans set an NBA record in:
  - Most combined 3-point field goals made in a game
    - 43 – Pelicans (19) vs. Golden State Warriors (24) on January 16, 2019
- The Pelicans set a franchise record in:
  - Most points scored in a game
    - 149 in a win against the Sacramento Kings on October 19, 2018
- Anthony Davis set a franchise record in:
  - Most rebounds in a game
    - 26 against the Brooklyn Nets on January 2, 2019
- Elfrid Payton tied a franchise record in:
  - Most triple-doubles in a season
    - 6 – tied with Chris Paul who set the record during the 2008–09 season

=== Milestones ===
- On October 17, 2018, in a win against the Houston Rockets, Elfrid Payton became the first player to average 10 points, 10 rebounds, and 10 assists in a game since Kyle Lowry did it on March 2, 2013.
- On November 7, 2018, Jrue Holiday reached 2,000 career assists in a win against the Chicago Bulls.
- On November 21, 2018, Anthony Davis reached 10,000 career points in a loss against the Philadelphia 76ers, becoming the eighth youngest player at 25 years and 255 days to reach the milestone.
- On January 29, 2019, Holiday recorded 19 points, eight assists, six rebounds and six blocks in a win against the Houston Rockets, becoming the first guard in NBA history to record at least 17 points, six rebounds, seven assists and six blocks in a game.
- On March 12, 2019, Payton recorded his second consecutive triple-double in a loss against the Milwaukee Bucks, becoming the first New Orleans player to have a triple-double in consecutive games since Chris Paul in 2008.
- On March 16, 2019, Payton recorded his fourth consecutive triple-double in a loss against the Phoenix Suns, joining James Harden, Magic Johnson, Michael Jordan and Russell Westbrook as the only players since the 1983–84 season to record triple-doubles in as many as four straight games.
- On March 18, 2019, Payton recorded his fifth consecutive triple-double in a win against the Dallas Mavericks, becoming the fifth player in NBA history to record five consecutive triple-doubles, joining Wilt Chamberlain, Michael Jordan, Oscar Robertson, and Russell Westbrook.

=== Team milestones ===
- During the season, the Pelicans led the league in:
  - Total two-point field goals made with 2,739
  - Two-point field goals made per game with 33.4
