= 2018–19 Portland Trail Blazers season =

NBA professional basketball team season

- Head coach: Terry Stotts
- President: Chris McGowan
- General manager: Neil Olshey
- Owners: Estate of Paul Allen
- Arena: Moda Center

Results
- Record: 53–29 (.646)
- Place: Division: 2nd (Northwest); Conference: 3rd (Western)
- Playoff finish: Conference finals (lost to Warriors 0–4)
- Stats at Basketball Reference

Local media
- Television: NBC Sports Northwest
- Radio: KPOJ, Portland Trail Blazers Radio

The 2018–19 Portland Trail Blazers season was the franchise's 49th season in the National Basketball Association (NBA).

Prior to the season, owner Paul Allen died at the age of 65, and thus the team's ownership was managed by his estate.

On March 25, 2019, the Trail Blazers clinched a playoff spot after defeating the Brooklyn Nets 148–144 in double overtime. Jusuf Nurkić suffered a season-ending injury in the same game.

In the playoffs, the Trail Blazers defeated the Oklahoma City Thunder in the first round, thanks to Damian Lillard's 37-foot series-clinching three pointer over Paul George in Game 5 at home, similar to his game-winner against the Houston Rockets in Game 6 of the First Round in the 2014 playoffs. The Trail Blazers thus won their first playoff series since 2016.

In the Semifinals, the Trail Blazers faced the Denver Nuggets. In Game 3 of the Semifinals, the Trail Blazers defeated the Nuggets 140–137 in the first quadruple overtime playoff game since 1953. They would eventually defeat the Nuggets in seven games, advancing to their first Western Conference finals since 2000. However, the Trail Blazers would be swept by the defending two-time NBA champion Golden State Warriors in four games. In that series, the Trail Blazers became the first team in 20 seasons to have a lead of 17 points or more in three straight playoff games and lose all three.

== Draft picks ==
Round	Pick	Player	Position	Nationality	School / club team
1	24	Anfernee Simons	SG	United States	IMG Academy
2	37	Gary Trent Jr.	SG	United States	Duke

== Roster ==
2018–19 Portland Trail Blazers roster
Players

Pos.	No.	Player	Height	Weight	DOB	From
F	8	Al-Farouq Aminu	6 ft 9 in (2.06 m)	220 lb (100 kg)	1990–09–21	Wake Forest
F/C	33	Zach Collins	7 ft 0 in (2.13 m)	235 lb (107 kg)	1997–11–19	Gonzaga
G	31	Seth Curry	6 ft 2 in (1.88 m)	185 lb (84 kg)	1990–08–23	Duke
F	4	Maurice Harkless	6 ft 9 in (2.06 m)	220 lb (100 kg)	1993–05–11	St. John's
G/F	5	Rodney Hood	6 ft 8 in (2.03 m)	206 lb (93 kg)	1992–10–20	Duke
C	00	Enes Kanter	6 ft 11 in (2.11 m)	250 lb (113 kg)	1992–05–20	Turkey
F	17	Skal Labissière	6 ft 11 in (2.11 m)	235 lb (107 kg)	1996–03–18	Kentucky
F	10	Jake Layman	6 ft 9 in (2.06 m)	215 lb (98 kg)	1994–03–07	Maryland
C	11	Meyers Leonard	7 ft 1 in (2.16 m)	255 lb (116 kg)	1992–02–27	Illinois
G	0	Damian Lillard	6 ft 3 in (1.91 m)	195 lb (88 kg)	1990–07–15	Weber State
G	3	CJ McCollum	6 ft 3 in (1.91 m)	190 lb (86 kg)	1991–09–19	Lehigh
C	27	Jusuf Nurkić	7 ft 0 in (2.13 m)	275 lb (125 kg)	1994–08–23	Bosnia and Herzegovina
G	24	Anfernee Simons	6 ft 4 in (1.93 m)	185 lb (84 kg)	1999–06–08	IMG Academy (FL)
G	9	Gary Trent Jr.	6 ft 6 in (1.98 m)	205 lb (93 kg)	1999–01–18	Duke
G/F	1	Evan Turner	6 ft 7 in (2.01 m)	220 lb (100 kg)	1988–10–27	Ohio State

Coaches
Head coach
- Terry Stotts
Assistant(s)
- John McCullough
- Jim Moran
- Dale Osbourne
- Nate Tibbetts
- David Vanterpool

Legend
- (DP) Unsigned draft pick
- (FA) Free agent
- (S) Suspended
- (GL) On assignment to G League
- (TW) Two-way affiliate player
- Injured

Roster
Updated: 2019–02–15

== Standings ==
=== Division ===
Northwest Division	W	L	PCT	GB	Home	Road	Div	GP
y – Denver Nuggets	54	28	.659	–	34‍–‍7	20‍–‍21	12–4	82
x – Portland Trail Blazers	53	29	.646	1.0	32‍–‍9	21‍–‍20	6–10	82
x – Utah Jazz	50	32	.610	4.0	29‍–‍12	21‍–‍20	8–8	82
x – Oklahoma City Thunder	49	33	.598	5.0	27‍–‍14	22‍–‍19	9–7	82
Minnesota Timberwolves	36	46	.439	18.0	25‍–‍16	11‍–‍30	5–11	82

=== Conference ===
Western Conference
#	Team	W	L	PCT	GB	GP
1	c – Golden State Warriors *	57	25	.695	–	82
2	y – Denver Nuggets *	54	28	.659	3.0	82
3	x – Portland Trail Blazers	53	29	.646	4.0	82
4	y – Houston Rockets *	53	29	.646	4.0	82
5	x – Utah Jazz	50	32	.610	7.0	82
6	x – Oklahoma City Thunder	49	33	.598	8.0	82
7	x – San Antonio Spurs	48	34	.585	9.0	82
8	x – Los Angeles Clippers	48	34	.585	9.0	82
9	Sacramento Kings	39	43	.476	18.0	82
10	Los Angeles Lakers	37	45	.451	20.0	82
11	Minnesota Timberwolves	36	46	.439	21.0	82
12	Memphis Grizzlies	33	49	.402	24.0	82
13	New Orleans Pelicans	33	49	.402	24.0	82
14	Dallas Mavericks	33	49	.402	24.0	82
15	Phoenix Suns	19	63	.232	38.0	82

== Game log ==
=== Preseason ===
2018 preseason game log
Total: 3–2 (home: 2–1; road: 1–1)
Preseason: 3–2 (home: 2–1; road: 1–1)

Game	Date	Team	Score	High points	High rebounds	High assists	Location Attendance	Record
1	September 29	@ Toronto	L 104–122	Leonard (14)	Swanigan (8)	Baldwin IV, Turner (3)	Rogers Arena; 18,654	0–1
2	October 5	@ Phoenix	W 115–93	Nurkic (16)	Nurkic (9)	Lillard, McCollum (5)	Talking Stick Resort Arena; 11,811	1–1
3	October 7	Utah	L 112–123	Lillard (23)	Nurkic (11)	Lillard (7)	Moda Center; 19,441	1–2
4	October 10	Phoenix	W 116–83	Layman (28)	Nurkic (8)	Stauskas (5)	Moda Center; 15,051	2–2
5	October 12	Sacramento	W 118–115	McCollum (21)	Collins (10)	McCollum (6)	Moda Center; 16,521	3–2

2018–19 season schedule

=== Regular season ===
2018–19 game log
Total: 53–29 (home: 32–9; road: 21–20)
October: 5–2 (home: 2–1; road: 3–1)

Game	Date	Team	Score	High points	High rebounds	High assists	Location Attendance	Record
1	October 18	LA Lakers	W 128–119	Damian Lillard (28)	Jusuf Nurkic (9)	Evan Turner (6)	Moda Center; 19,996	1–0
2	October 20	San Antonio	W 121–108	Damian Lillard (29)	Nurkic, Harkless (8)	Damian Lillard (9)	Moda Center; 18,354	2–0
3	October 22	Washington	L 124–125 (OT)	Damian Lillard (29)	Jusuf Nurkic (18)	Damian Lillard (8)	Moda Center; 19,187	2–1
4	October 25	@ Orlando	W 128–114	Damian Lillard (41)	Al-Farouq Aminu (15)	Lillard, Turner (6)	Amway Center; 15,114	3–1
5	October 27	@ Miami	L 111–120	Damian Lillard (42)	Lillard, Nurkic, McCollum (7)	Damian Lillard (6)	American Airlines Arena; 19,600	3–2
6	October 29	@ Indiana	W 103–93	Collins, McCollum (17)	Al-Farouq Aminu (10)	Nik Stauskas (5)	Bankers Life Fieldhouse; 15,788	4–2
7	October 30	@ Houston	W 104–85	Lillard, Nurkic (22)	Jusuf Nurkic (10)	Damian Lillard (7)	Toyota Center; 18,055	5–2

November : 8–7 (home: 6–3; road: 2–4)

Game	Date	Team	Score	High points	High rebounds	High assists	Location Attendance	Record
8	November 1	New Orleans	W 132–119	Damian Lillard (33)	Al-Farouq Aminu (10)	Evan Turner (7)	Moda Center; 18,921	6–2
9	November 3	LA Lakers	L 110–114	Lillard, McCollum (30)	Aminu, Nurkić (13)	Lillard, McCollum, Stauskas (4)	Moda Center; 19,848	6–3
10	November 4	Minnesota	W 111–81	Jusuf Nurkic (19)	Jusuf Nurkic (12)	Damian Lillard (5)	Moda Center; 19,522	7–3
11	November 6	Milwaukee	W 118–103	CJ McCollum (40)	Evan Turner (11)	McCollum, Nurkić (6)	Moda Center; 19,512	8–3
12	November 8	LA Clippers	W 116–105	Damian Lillard (25)	Jusuf Nurkic (9)	Evan Turner (7)	Moda Center; 19,170	9–3
13	November 11	Boston	W 100–94	Damian Lillard (19)	Jusuf Nurkic (17)	Damian Lillard (12)	Moda Center; 19,712	10–3
14	November 14	@ LA Lakers	L 117–126	Damian Lillard (31)	Jusuf Nurkic (14)	Damian Lillard (11)	Staples Center; 18,997	10–4
15	November 16	@ Minnesota	L 96–112	CJ McCollum (18)	Jusuf Nurkic (11)	Damian Lillard (5)	Target Center; 18,978	10–5
16	November 18	@ Washington	W 119–109	Damian Lillard (40)	Jusuf Nurkic (14)	Jusuf Nurkic (8)	Capital One Arena; 16,647	11–5
17	November 20	@ New York	W 118–114	CJ McCollum (31)	Jusuf Nurkic (11)	Damian Lillard (8)	Madison Square Garden; 19,812	12–5
18	November 21	@ Milwaukee	L 100–143	McCollum, Lillard (22)	Al-Farouq Aminu (9)	Damian Lillard (5)	Fiserv Forum; 17,591	12–6
19	November 23	@ Golden State	L 97–125	Damian Lillard (23)	Jusuf Nurkic (8)	Damian Lillard (8)	Oracle Arena; 19,596	12–7
20	November 25	LA Clippers	L 100–104	Damian Lillard (30)	Meyers Leonard (16)	Damian Lillard (4)	Moda Center; 19,138	12–8
21	November 28	Orlando	W 115–112	Damian Lillard (41)	Jusuf Nurkic (13)	Evan Turner (7)	Moda Center; 18,865	13–8
22	November 30	Denver	L 112–113	CJ McCollum (33)	Jusuf Nurkic (11)	Damian Lillard (8)	Moda Center; 19,459	13–9

December : 8–7 (home: 6–2; road: 2–5)

Game	Date	Team	Score	High points	High rebounds	High assists	Location Attendance	Record
23	December 2	@ San Antonio	L 118–131	Damian Lillard (37)	Al-Farouq Aminu (9)	Damian Lillard (10)	AT&T Center; 18,354	13–10
24	December 4	@ Dallas	L 102–111	Damian Lillard (33)	Al-Farouq Aminu (13)	Damian Lillard (8)	American Airlines Center; 19,431	13–11
25	December 6	Phoenix	W 108–86	Damian Lillard (25)	Jusuf Nurkic (14)	Damian Lillard (8)	Moda Center; 19,001	14–11
26	December 8	Minnesota	W 113–105	Damian Lillard (28)	Jusuf Nurkic (11)	Damian Lillard (6)	Moda Center; 19,359	15–11
27	December 11	@ Houston	L 104–111	Damian Lillard (34)	Al-Farouq Aminu (15)	Evan Turner (6)	Toyota Center; 18,055	15–12
28	December 12	@ Memphis	L 83–92	CJ McCollum (40)	Jusuf Nurkic (10)	Lillard, Turner, Leonard (3)	FedExForum; 16,282	15–13
29	December 14	Toronto	W 128–122	Damian Lillard (24)	Jusuf Nurkic (9)	Jusuf Nurkic (7)	Moda Center; 19,596	16–13
30	December 17	@ LA Clippers	W 131–127	Damian Lillard (39)	Al-Farouq Aminu (10)	Jusuf Nurkic (7)	Staples Center; 16,030	17–13
31	December 19	Memphis	W 99–92	Damian Lillard (24)	Meyers Leonard (8)	Lillard, Turner (4)	Moda Center; 19,412	18–13
32	December 21	Utah	L 90–120	Damian Lillard (19)	Jusuf Nurkic (10)	Jusuf Nurkic (4)	Moda Center; 19,127	18–14
33	December 23	Dallas	W 121–118 (OT)	Damian Lillard (33)	Jusuf Nurkic (12)	Damian Lillard (7)	Moda Center; 19,707	19–14
34	December 25	@ Utah	L 96–117	Damian Lillard (20)	Jusuf Nurkic (10)	Damian Lillard (4)	Vivint Smart Home Arena; 18,306	19–15
35	December 27	@ Golden State	W 110–109 (OT)	Jusuf Nurkic (27)	Aminu, Nurkic (12)	Damian Lillard (5)	Oracle Arena; 19,596	20–15
36	December 29	Golden State	L 105–115	Damian Lillard (40)	Jusuf Nurkic (10)	Jusuf Nurkic (7)	Moda Center; 19,797	20–16
37	December 30	Philadelphia	W 129–95	CJ McCollum (35)	Aminu, Leonard (8)	Damian Lillard (5)	Moda Center; 19,393	21–16

January : 11–4 (home: 8–1; road: 3–3)

Game	Date	Team	Score	High points	High rebounds	High assists	Location Attendance	Record
38	January 1	@ Sacramento	W 113–108 (OT)	Damian Lillard (25)	Jusuf Nurkic (23)	Jusuf Nurkic (7)	Golden 1 Center; 17,583	22–16
39	January 4	Oklahoma City	L 109–111	Damian Lillard (23)	Al-Farouq Aminu (15)	Damian Lillard (8)	Moda Center; 19,393	22–17
40	January 5	Houston	W 110–101	Jusuf Nurkic (25)	Jusuf Nurkic (15)	Damian Lillard (12)	Moda Center; 19,577	23–17
41	January 7	New York	W 111–101	Jusuf Nurkic (20)	Jake Layman (10)	Damian Lillard (9)	Moda Center; 19,026	24–17
42	January 9	Chicago	W 124–112	CJ McCollum (24)	Zach Collins (9)	Damian Lillard (10)	Moda Center; 19,393	25–17
43	January 11	Charlotte	W 127–96	CJ McCollum (30)	Jusuf Nurkic (11)	Jusuf Nurkic (8)	Moda Center; 19,393	26–17
44	January 13	@ Denver	L 116–119	Damian Lillard (26)	Al-Farouq Aminu (12)	Damian Lillard (7)	Pepsi Center; 19,520	26–18
45	January 14	@ Sacramento	L 107–115	Damian Lillard (35)	Aminu, Nurkic (11)	Lillard, Nurkic (5)	Golden 1 Center; 17,583	26–19
46	January 16	Cleveland	W 129–112	Damian Lillard (33)	Jusuf Nurkic (10)	Jusuf Nurkic (10)	Moda Center; 19,089	27–19
47	January 18	New Orleans	W 128–112	Damian Lillard (24)	Jusuf Nurkic (12)	Damian Lillard (8)	Moda Center; 19,598	28–19
48	January 21	@ Utah	W 109–104	Damian Lillard (26)	Lillard, Nurkic, Turner (8)	Damian Lillard (8)	Vivint Smart Home Arena; 18,306	29–19
49	January 22	@ Oklahoma City	L 114–123	Damian Lillard (34)	Jusuf Nurkic (15)	Damian Lillard (8)	Chesapeake Energy Arena; 18,203	29–20
50	January 24	@ Phoenix	W 120–106	Damian Lillard (24)	Jusuf Nurkic (9)	Evan Turner (7)	Talking Stick Resort Arena; 15,441	30–20
51	January 26	Atlanta	W 120–111	CJ McCollum (28)	CJ McCollum (10)	CJ McCollum (10)	Moda Center; 19,629	31–20
52	January 30	Utah	W 132–105	Damian Lillard (36)	Collins, Lillard (8)	Damian Lillard (11)	Moda Center; 19,393	32–20

February : 6–3 (home: 2–1; road: 4–2)

Game	Date	Team	Score	High points	High rebounds	High assists	Location Attendance	Record
53	February 5	Miami	L 108–118	CJ McCollum (33)	Jake Layman (8)	Damian Lillard (10)	Moda Center; 19,468	32–21
54	February 7	San Antonio	W 127–118	CJ McCollum (30)	CJ McCollum (9)	Damian Lillard (9)	Moda Center; 19,393	33–21
55	February 10	@ Dallas	L 101–102	Damian Lillard (30)	Jusuf Nurkic (10)	Evan Turner (7)	American Airlines Center; 20,340	33–22
56	February 11	@ Oklahoma City	L 111–120	Damian Lillard (31)	Jusuf Nurkic (12)	Damian Lillard (6)	Chesapeake Energy Arena; 18,203	33–23
57	February 13	Golden State	W 129–107	Damian Lillard (29)	Jusuf Nurkic (11)	Damian Lillard (8)	Moda Center; 19,549	34–23
58	February 21	@ Brooklyn	W 113–99	Jusuf Nurkic (27)	Jusuf Nurkic (12)	Damian Lillard (8)	Barclays Center; 17,732	35–23
59	February 23	@ Philadelphia	W 130–115	Jusuf Nurkic (24)	Jake Layman (11)	Damian Lillard (8)	Wells Fargo Center; 20,619	36–23
60	February 25	@ Cleveland	W 123–110	CJ McCollum (25)	Harkless, Nurkic (8)	Damian Lillard (8)	Quicken Loans Arena; 19,432	37–23
61	February 27	@ Boston	W 97–92	Damian Lillard (33)	Maurice Harkless (10)	Damian Lillard (4)	TD Garden; 18,624	38–23

March : 10–5 (home: 5–1; road: 5–4)

Game	Date	Team	Score	High points	High rebounds	High assists	Location Attendance	Record
62	March 1	@ Toronto	L 117–119	CJ McCollum (35)	Damian Lillard (8)	Damian Lillard (6)	Scotiabank Arena; 19,800	38–24
63	March 3	@ Charlotte	W 118–108	Rodney Hood (27)	Jusuf Nurkic (15)	McCollum, Nurkic (6)	Spectrum Center; 18,355	39–24
64	March 5	@ Memphis	L 111–120	CJ McCollum (27)	Jusuf Nurkic (10)	Jusuf Nurkic (9)	FedExForum; 13,801	39–25
65	March 7	Oklahoma City	L 121–129 (OT)	Damian Lillard (51)	Jusuf Nurkic (17)	Damian Lillard (9)	Moda Center; 20,037	39–26
66	March 9	Phoenix	W 127–120	CJ McCollum (26)	Jusuf Nurkic (9)	Damian Lillard (9)	Moda Center; 19,851	40–26
67	March 12	@ L. A. Clippers	W 125–104	CJ McCollum (35)	Jusuf Nurkic (12)	Damian Lillard (12)	Staples Center; 16,686	41–26
68	March 15	@ New Orleans	W 122–110	Damian Lillard (24)	Jusuf Nurkic (12)	Damian Lillard (7)	Smoothie King Center; 16,117	42–26
69	March 16	@ San Antonio	L 103–108	Damian Lillard (34)	Jusuf Nurkic (16)	Lillard, McCollum (5)	AT&T Center; 18,354	42–27
70	March 18	Indiana	W 106–98	Damian Lillard (30)	Jusuf Nurkic (11)	Damian Lillard (15)	Moda Center; 19,393	43–27
71	March 20	Dallas	W 126–118	Damian Lillard (33)	Jusuf Nurkic (10)	Damian Lillard (12)	Moda Center; 19,803	44–27
72	March 23	Detroit	W 117–112	Damian Lillard (28)	Aminu, Kanter (7)	Damian Lillard (9)	Moda Center; 19,815	45–27
73	March 25	Brooklyn	W 148–144 (2OT)	Jusuf Nurkic (32)	Jusuf Nurkic (16)	Damian Lillard (12)	Moda Center; 20,188	46–27
74	March 27	@ Chicago	W 118–98	Seth Curry (20)	Al-Farouq Aminu (11)	Evan Turner (8)	United Center; 20,506	47–27
75	March 29	@ Atlanta	W 118–98	Damian Lillard (36)	Al-Farouq Aminu (11)	Damian Lillard (7)	State Farm Arena; 16,182	48–27
76	March 30	@ Detroit	L 90–99	Damian Lillard (23)	Enes Kanter (15)	Lillard, Leonard, S. Curry (3)	Little Caesars Arena; 18,592	48–28

April : 5–1 (home: 3–0; road: 2–1)

Game	Date	Team	Score	High points	High rebounds	High assists	Location Attendance	Record
77	April 1	@ Minnesota	W 132–122	Rodney Hood (21)	Kanter, Turner (11)	Damian Lillard (12)	Target Center; 11,209	49–28
78	April 3	Memphis	W 116–89	Enes Kanter (21)	Enes Kanter (15)	Evan Turner (11)	Moda Center; 19,608	50–28
79	April 5	@ Denver	L 110–119	Enes Kanter (24)	Al-Farouq Aminu (14)	Damian Lillard (8)	Pepsi Center; 19,928	50–29
80	April 7	Denver	W 115–108	Damian Lillard (30)	Enes Kanter (13)	CJ McCollum (6)	Moda Center; 19,890	51–29
81	April 9	@ L. A. Lakers	W 104–101	Maurice Harkless (26)	Enes Kanter (16)	Damian Lillard (8)	Staples Center; 18,997	52–29
82	April 10	Sacramento	W 136–131	Anfernee Simons (37)	Skal Labissière (15)	Anfernee Simons (9)	Moda Center; 19,814	53–29

2018–19 season schedule

== Playoffs ==
=== Game log ===
2019 playoff game log
First Round: 4–1 (home: 3–0; road: 1–1)

Game	Date	Team	Score	High points	High rebounds	High assists	Location Attendance	Series
1	April 14	Oklahoma City	W 104–99	Damian Lillard (30)	Enes Kanter (18)	Damian Lillard (4)	Moda Center; 19,886	1–0
2	April 16	Oklahoma City	W 114–94	CJ McCollum (33)	Maurice Harkless (9)	Damian Lillard (6)	Moda Center; 20,041	2–0
3	April 19	@ Oklahoma City	L 108–120	Damian Lillard (32)	Al-Farouq Aminu (9)	CJ McCollum (7)	Chesapeake Energy Arena; 18,203	2–1
4	April 21	@ Oklahoma City	W 111–98	CJ McCollum (27)	Kanter, Harkless (10)	Damian Lillard (8)	Chesapeake Energy Arena; 18,203	3–1
5	April 23	Oklahoma City	W 118–115	Damian Lillard (50)	Enes Kanter (13)	Damian Lillard (3)	Moda Center; 20,041	4–1

Conference Semifinals: 4–3 (home: 2–1; road: 2–2)

Game	Date	Team	Score	High points	High rebounds	High assists	Location Attendance	Series
1	April 29	@ Denver	L 113–121	Damian Lillard (39)	Aminu, Turner (8)	Damian Lillard (6)	Pepsi Center; 19,520	0–1
2	May 1	@ Denver	W 97–90	CJ McCollum (20)	Al-Farouq Aminu (10)	CJ McCollum (6)	Pepsi Center; 19,520	1–1
3	May 3	Denver	W 140–137 (4OT)	CJ McCollum (41)	Enes Kanter (15)	Damian Lillard (8)	Moda Center; 20,193	2–1
4	May 5	Denver	L 112–116	CJ McCollum (29)	Enes Kanter (10)	Damian Lillard (7)	Moda Center; 20,146	2–2
5	May 7	@ Denver	L 98–124	Damian Lillard (22)	Enes Kanter (8)	Damian Lillard (4)	Pepsi Center; 19,520	2–3
6	May 9	Denver	W 119–108	Damian Lillard (32)	Enes Kanter (14)	Evan Turner (7)	Moda Center; 20,022	3–3
7	May 12	@ Denver	W 100–96	CJ McCollum (37)	Enes Kanter (13)	Damian Lillard (8)	Pepsi Center; 19,725	4–3

Conference Finals: 0–4 (home: 0–2; road: 0–2)

Game	Date	Team	Score	High points	High rebounds	High assists	Location Attendance	Series
1	May 14	@ Golden State	L 94–116	Damian Lillard (19)	Enes Kanter (16)	Damian Lillard (6)	Oracle Arena; 19,596	0–1
2	May 16	@ Golden State	L 111–114	Damian Lillard (23)	Aminu, Leonard (6)	Damian Lillard (10)	Oracle Arena; 19,596	0–2
3	May 18	Golden State	L 99–110	CJ McCollum (23)	Zach Collins (8)	Damian Lillard (6)	Moda Center; 20,214	0–3
4	May 20	Golden State	L 117–119 (OT)	Meyers Leonard (30)	Meyers Leonard (12)	Damian Lillard (12)	Moda Center; 20,064	0–4

2019 playoff schedule

== Player statistics ==
=== Regular season ===
Player	Pos.	GP	GS	MP	Reb.	Ast.	Stl.	Blk.	Pts.
Al-Farouq Aminu	PF	81	81	2,292	610	104	68	33	760
Wade Baldwin^{†}	PG	16	0	94	15	12	1	2	30
Zach Collins	C	77	0	1,356	324	71	25	66	512
Seth Curry	SG	74	2	1,399	120	66	36	12	581
Maurice Harkless	SF	60	53	1,415	269	74	67	53	460
Rodney Hood^{≠}	SG	27	4	659	45	34	21	7	258
Enes Kanter^{≠}	C	23	8	512	198	32	14	9	301
Skal Labissière^{≠}	PF	9	1	63	19	5	3	3	31
Jake Layman	SF	71	33	1,327	217	53	31	30	541
Meyers Leonard	C	61	2	878	233	75	13	9	357
Damian Lillard	PG	80	80	2,838	371	551	88	34	2,067
CJ McCollum	SG	70	70	2,375	282	207	55	28	1,468
Jusuf Nurkić	C	72	72	1,974	748	233	71	103	1,125
Anfernee Simons	SG	20	1	141	13	13	1	0	75
Nik Stauskas^{†}	SG	44	0	673	80	62	14	4	267
Caleb Swanigan^{†}	PF	18	0	145	52	7	4	0	35
Gary Trent	SG	15	1	111	11	5	1	2	40
Evan Turner	PG	73	2	1,605	328	283	33	18	494

After all games.
^{‡}Waived during the season
^{†}Traded during the season
^{≠}Acquired during the season

=== Playoffs ===
Player	Pos.	GP	GS	MP	Reb.	Ast.	Stl.	Blk.	Pts.
Al-Farouq Aminu	PF	16	16	399	100	21	9	10	118
Zach Collins	C	16	0	275	57	14	7	22	109
Seth Curry	SG	16	0	326	25	13	12	4	90
Maurice Harkless	SF	16	16	388	78	23	18	16	134
Rodney Hood	SG	16	0	373	36	14	6	3	158
Enes Kanter	C	16	14	461	155	19	11	9	182
Skal Labissière	PF	3	0	11	0	0	0	0	2
Jake Layman	SF	6	0	20	4	0	0	0	5
Meyers Leonard	C	11	2	170	40	12	2	1	85
Damian Lillard	PG	16	16	650	76	106	27	5	430
CJ McCollum	SG	16	16	635	80	59	13	10	395
Anfernee Simons	SG	5	0	12	0	0	1	0	4
Evan Turner	PG	16	0	245	73	35	3	3	43

== Transactions ==
=== Trades ===
June 21, 2018	To Portland Trail Blazers Draft rights to Gary Trent Jr.	To Sacramento Kings 2019 second-round pick 2021 Miami second-round pick Cash considerations
February 3, 2019	To Portland Trail Blazers Rodney Hood	To Cleveland Cavaliers Wade Baldwin IV; Nik Stauskas; 2021 second-round pick 2023 second-round pick

=== Free agency ===
==== Re-signed ====
Player	Signed
Jusuf Nurkić	July 6, 2018

==== Additions ====
Player	Signed	Former team
Nik Stauskas	July 5, 2018	Brooklyn Nets
Seth Curry	July 6, 2018	Dallas Mavericks
Cameron Oliver	September 4, 2018	Delaware 87ers (G League)
Chinanu Onuaku	September 4, 2018	Dallas Mavericks
Gary Payton II	September 4, 2018	Los Angeles Lakers

==== Subtractions ====
Player	Reason left	New team
Shabazz Napier		Brooklyn Nets
Georgios Papagiannis	Waived	(Greece) Panathinaikos
Ed Davis		Brooklyn Nets
Pat Connaughton		Milwaukee Bucks
C. J. Wilcox	Two-way contract	Indiana Pacers
