= 2018–19 Denver Nuggets season =

NBA professional basketball team season

- Division champions
- Head coach: Michael Malone
- President: Tim Connelly
- General manager: Artūras Karnišovas
- Owners: Ann Walton Kroenke
- Arena: Pepsi Center

Results
- Record: 54–28 (.659)
- Place: Division: 1st (Northwest); Conference: 2nd (Western)
- Playoff finish: Conference semifinals (lost to Trail Blazers 3–4)
- Stats at Basketball Reference

Local media
- Television: Altitude Sports and Entertainment
- Radio: KKSE

The 2018–19 Denver Nuggets season was the 43rd season of the franchise in the National Basketball Association (NBA). The team revealed a new logo for the 2018–19 season. With a win against the Boston Celtics on March 18, the Nuggets clinched a playoff spot for the first time since the 2012–13 season.

In the playoffs, the Nuggets defeated the San Antonio Spurs in the First Round in seven games, winning their first playoff series since the Carmelo Anthony era in 2009. In the Semifinals, the Nuggets lost to the Portland Trail Blazers in seven games.

== Draft ==
Round	Pick	Player	Position	Nationality	College / Club
1	14	Michael Porter Jr.	SF	United States	Missouri
2	41	Jarred Vanderbilt	SF	United States	Kentucky
2	58	Thomas Welsh	C	United States	UCLA

== Roster ==
2018–19 Denver Nuggets roster
Players

Pos.	No.	Player	Height	Weight	DOB	From
G	5	Will Barton	6 ft 6 in (1.98 m)	190 lb (86 kg)	1991–01–06	Memphis
G	25	Malik Beasley	6 ft 5 in (1.96 m)	195 lb (88 kg)	1996–11–26	Florida State
F	3	Torrey Craig	6 ft 7 in (2.01 m)	215 lb (98 kg)	1990–12–19	USC Upstate
G	6	Brandon Goodwin (TW)	6 ft 2 in (1.88 m)	180 lb (82 kg)	1995–10–02	Florida Gulf Coast
G	14	Gary Harris	6 ft 4 in (1.93 m)	210 lb (95 kg)	1994–09–14	Michigan State
F	41	Juan Hernangómez	6 ft 9 in (2.06 m)	230 lb (104 kg)	1995–09–28	Spain
C	15	Nikola Jokić	7 ft 0 in (2.13 m)	250 lb (113 kg)	1995–02–19	Serbia
F	20	Tyler Lydon	6 ft 10 in (2.08 m)	225 lb (102 kg)	1996–04–09	Syracuse
F	7	Trey Lyles	6 ft 10 in (2.08 m)	234 lb (106 kg)	1995–11–05	Kentucky
F	4	Paul Millsap	6 ft 8 in (2.03 m)	246 lb (112 kg)	1985–02–10	Louisiana Tech
G	11	Monté Morris	6 ft 3 in (1.91 m)	175 lb (79 kg)	1995–06–27	Iowa State
G	27	Jamal Murray	6 ft 4 in (1.93 m)	207 lb (94 kg)	1997–02–23	Kentucky
F/C	24	Mason Plumlee	6 ft 11 in (2.11 m)	255 lb (116 kg)	1990–03–05	Duke
F	1	Michael Porter	6 ft 10 in (2.08 m)	210 lb (95 kg)	1998–06–29	Missouri
G	0	Isaiah Thomas	5 ft 9 in (1.75 m)	185 lb (84 kg)	1989–02–07	Washington
F	8	Jarred Vanderbilt	6 ft 9 in (2.06 m)	214 lb (97 kg)	1999–04–03	Kentucky
C	45	Thomas Welsh (TW)	7 ft 0 in (2.13 m)	255 lb (116 kg)	1996–02–03	UCLA

Coaches
Head coach
- Michael Malone
Assistant(s)
- David Adelman
- Ryan Bowen
- Jordi Fernández
- Charles Klask
- Mark Price
- Wes Unseld Jr.
- Bob Weiss

Legend
- (DP) Unsigned draft pick
- (FA) Free agent
- (S) Suspended
- (GL) On assignment to G League
- (TW) Two-way affiliate player
- Injured

Roster
Updated: 2019–02–14

== Standings ==
=== Division ===
Northwest Division	W	L	PCT	GB	Home	Road	Div	GP
y – Denver Nuggets	54	28	.659	–	34‍–‍7	20‍–‍21	12–4	82
x – Portland Trail Blazers	53	29	.646	1.0	32‍–‍9	21‍–‍20	6–10	82
x – Utah Jazz	50	32	.610	4.0	29‍–‍12	21‍–‍20	8–8	82
x – Oklahoma City Thunder	49	33	.598	5.0	27‍–‍14	22‍–‍19	9–7	82
Minnesota Timberwolves	36	46	.439	18.0	25‍–‍16	11‍–‍30	5–11	82

=== Conference ===
Western Conference
#	Team	W	L	PCT	GB	GP
1	c – Golden State Warriors *	57	25	.695	–	82
2	y – Denver Nuggets *	54	28	.659	3.0	82
3	x – Portland Trail Blazers	53	29	.646	4.0	82
4	y – Houston Rockets *	53	29	.646	4.0	82
5	x – Utah Jazz	50	32	.610	7.0	82
6	x – Oklahoma City Thunder	49	33	.598	8.0	82
7	x – San Antonio Spurs	48	34	.585	9.0	82
8	x – Los Angeles Clippers	48	34	.585	9.0	82
9	Sacramento Kings	39	43	.476	18.0	82
10	Los Angeles Lakers	37	45	.451	20.0	82
11	Minnesota Timberwolves	36	46	.439	21.0	82
12	Memphis Grizzlies	33	49	.402	24.0	82
13	New Orleans Pelicans	33	49	.402	24.0	82
14	Dallas Mavericks	33	49	.402	24.0	82
15	Phoenix Suns	19	63	.232	38.0	82

== Game log ==
=== Preseason ===
2018 preseason game log
Total: 4–1 (home: 1–0; road: 3–1)
Preseason: 4–1 (home: 1–0; road: 3–1)

Game	Date	Team	Score	High points	High rebounds	High assists	Location Attendance	Record
1	September 30	@ LA Lakers	W 124–107	Juan Hernangómez (19)	Mason Plumlee (8)	Mason Plumlee (6)	Valley View Casino Center; 13,565	1–0
2	October 2	@ LA Lakers	W 113–111	Mason Plumlee (23)	Nikola Jokic (6)	Trey Lyles (6)	Staples Center; 18,997	2–0
3	October 5	Perth Wildcats	W 96–88	Monte Morris (15)	Paul Millsap (9)	Monte Morris (9)	Pepsi Center; 9,812	3–0
4	October 9	@ LA Clippers	L 103–109	Trey Lyles (15)	Juan Hernangómez (12)	Monte Morris (6)	Staples Center; 10,187	3–1
5	October 12	@ Chicago	W 98–93	Gary Harris (18)	Mason Plumlee (9)	Will Barton (7)	United Center; 18,973	4–1

2018–19 season schedule

=== Regular season ===
2018–19 game log
Total: 54–28 (home: 34–7; road: 20–21)
October: 6–1 (home: 4–0; road: 2–1)

Game	Date	Team	Score	High points	High rebounds	High assists	Location Attendance	Record
1	October 17	@ L.A. Clippers	W 107–98	Nikola Jokić (21)	Paul Millsap (16)	Nikola Jokić (5)	Staples Center; 19,068	1–0
2	October 20	Phoenix	W 119–91	Nikola Jokić (35)	Nikola Jokić (12)	Nikola Jokić (11)	Pepsi Center; 19,592	2–0
3	October 21	Golden State	W 100–98	Gary Harris (28)	Nikola Jokić (11)	Nikola Jokić (6)	Pepsi Center; 19,520	3–0
4	October 23	Sacramento	W 126–112	Jamal Murray (19)	Nikola Jokić (12)	Monté Morris (7)	Pepsi Center; 13,214	4–0
5	October 25	@ L.A. Lakers	L 114–121	Nikola Jokić (24)	Nikola Jokić (11)	Monté Morris (7)	Staples Center; 18,997	4–1
6	October 29	New Orleans	W 116–111	Harris & Murray (23)	Nikola Jokić (9)	Nikola Jokić (10)	Pepsi Center; 15,217	5–1
7	October 31	@ Chicago	W 108–107 (OT)	Nikola Jokić (22)	Nikola Jokić (12)	Nikola Jokić (9)	United Center; 19,027	6–1

November : 9–6 (home: 5–3; road: 4–3)

Game	Date	Team	Score	High points	High rebounds	High assists	Location Attendance	Record
8	November 1	@ Cleveland	W 110–91	Juan Hernangómez (23)	Trey Lyles (8)	Malik Beasley (4)	Quicken Loans Arena; 19,432	7–1
9	November 3	Utah	W 103–88	Gary Harris (20)	Nikola Jokić (10)	Nikola Jokić (16)	Pepsi Center; 19,520	8–1
10	November 5	Boston	W 115–107	Jamal Murray (48)	Nikola Jokić (10)	Nikola Jokić (8)	Pepsi Center; 19,520	9–1
11	November 7	@ Memphis	L 87–89	Gary Harris (20)	Trey Lyles (9)	Jamal Murray (7)	FedExForum; 15,832	9–2
12	November 9	Brooklyn	L 110–112	Nikola Jokić (37)	Nikola Jokić (21)	Jamal Murray (7)	Pepsi Center; 19,520	9–3
13	November 11	Milwaukee	L 114–121	Paul Millsap (25)	Millsap, Jokić (8)	Monté Morris (10)	Pepsi Center; 19,520	9–4
14	November 13	Houston	L 99–109	Monté Morris (19)	Nikola Jokić (12)	Nikola Jokić (7)	Pepsi Center; 16,741	9–5
15	November 15	Atlanta	W 138–93	Juan Hernangómez (25)	Hernangómez, Millsap, Jokić (9)	Nikola Jokić (7)	Pepsi Center; 15,103	10–5
16	November 17	@ New Orleans	L 115–125	Nikola Jokić (25)	Juan Hernangómez (11)	Nikola Jokić (8)	Smoothie King Center; 15,408	10–6
17	November 19	@ Milwaukee	L 98–104	Nikola Jokić (20)	Paul Millsap (9)	Jamal Murray (9)	Fiserv Forum; 17,341	10–7
18	November 21	@ Minnesota	W 103–101	Paul Millsap (25)	Nikola Jokić (12)	Nikola Jokić (10)	Target Center; 15,086	11–7
19	November 23	Orlando	W 112–87	Trey Lyles (22)	Mason Plumlee (11)	Nikola Jokić (10)	Pepsi Center; 19,520	12–7
20	November 24	@ Oklahoma City	W 105–98	Jamal Murray (22)	Torrey Craig (10)	Jamal Murray (8)	Chesapeake Energy Arena; 18,203	13–7
21	November 27	L.A. Lakers	W 117–85	Millsap, Beasley, Murray (20)	Paul Millsap (11)	Jokić & Morris (7)	Pepsi Center; 19,583	14–7
22	November 30	@ Portland	W 113–112	Gary Harris (27)	Juan Hernangómez (11)	Nikola Jokić (8)	Moda Center; 19,459	15–7

December : 8–4 (home: 5–0; road: 3–4)

Game	Date	Team	Score	High points	High rebounds	High assists	Location Attendance	Record
23	December 3	@ Toronto	W 106–103	Nikola Jokić (23)	Nikola Jokić (11)	Nikola Jokić (15)	Air Canada Centre; 19,800	16–7
24	December 5	@ Orlando	W 124–118 (OT)	Jamal Murray (31)	Jokić & Millsap (8)	Nikola Jokić (13)	Amway Center; 16,636	17–7
25	December 7	@ Charlotte	L 107–113	Jamal Murray (20)	Nikola Jokić (11)	Jamal Murray (7)	Spectrum Center; 13,755	17–8
26	December 8	@ Atlanta	L 98–106	Nikola Jokić (24)	Nikola Jokić (11)	Jokić & Morris (7)	Philips Arena; 14,409	17–9
27	December 10	Memphis	W 105–99	Nikola Jokić (27)	Nikola Jokić (12)	Nikola Jokić (6)	Pepsi Center; 15,278	18–9
28	December 14	Oklahoma City	W 109–98	Nikola Jokić (24)	Nikola Jokić (15)	Nikola Jokić (9)	Pepsi Center; 19,520	19–9
29	December 16	Toronto	W 95–86	Nikola Jokić (26)	Nikola Jokić (9)	Jokić, Morris, Murray (4)	Pepsi Center; 19,520	20–9
30	December 18	Dallas	W 126–118	Nikola Jokić (32)	Nikola Jokić (16)	Jamal Murray (15)	Pepsi Center; 15,764	21–9
31	December 22	@ L.A. Clippers	L 111–132	Nikola Jokić (19)	Mason Plumlee (9)	Monté Morris (5)	Staples Center; 16,571	21–10
32	December 26	@ San Antonio	L 103–111	Juan Hernangómez (27)	Juan Hernangómez (13)	Nikola Jokić (10)	AT&T Center; 18,408	21–11
33	December 28	San Antonio	W 102–99	Jamal Murray (31)	Mason Plumlee (13)	Nikola Jokić (9)	Pepsi Center; 20,076	22–11
34	December 29	@ Phoenix	W 122–118	Jamal Murray (46)	Juan Hernangómez (9)	Nikola Jokić (9)	Talking Stick Resort Arena; 14,975	23–11

January : 12–4 (home: 8–1; road: 4–3)

Game	Date	Team	Score	High points	High rebounds	High assists	Location Attendance	Record
35	January 1	New York	W 115–108	Malik Beasley (23)	Nikola Jokić (14)	Nikola Jokić (15)	Pepsi Center; 19,520	24–11
36	January 3	@ Sacramento	W 117–113	Jamal Murray (36)	Nikola Jokić (13)	Jokić, Murray (6)	Golden 1 Center; 17,583	25–11
37	January 5	Charlotte	W 123–110	Nikola Jokić (39)	Nikola Jokić (12)	Jamal Murray (7)	Pepsi Center; 19,861	26–11
38	January 7	@ Houston	L 113–125	Nikola Jokić (24)	Nikola Jokić (13)	Monté Morris (5)	Toyota Center; 18,055	26–12
39	January 8	@ Miami	W 103–99	Nikola Jokić (29)	Torrey Craig (16)	Nikola Jokić (10)	American Airlines Arena; 19,600	27–12
40	January 10	L.A. Clippers	W 121–100	Jamal Murray (23)	Nikola Jokić (14)	Nikola Jokić (10)	Pepsi Center; 15,742	28–12
41	January 12	@ Phoenix	L 93–102	Nikola Jokić (23)	Paul Millsap (11)	Murray, Morris (5)	Talking Stick Resort Arena; 15,246	28–13
42	January 13	Portland	W 116–113	Nikola Jokić (40)	Nikola Jokić (10)	Nikola Jokić (8)	Pepsi Center; 19,520	29–13
43	January 15	Golden State	L 111–142	Malik Beasley (22)	Will Barton (8)	Nikola Jokić (8)	Pepsi Center; 19,896	29–14
44	January 17	Chicago	W 135–105	Jamal Murray (25)	Nikola Jokić (8)	Nikola Jokić (11)	Pepsi Center; 17,289	30–14
45	January 19	Cleveland	W 124–102	Jamal Murray (26)	Nikola Jokić (11)	Nikola Jokić (12)	Pepsi Center; 19,520	31–14
46	January 23	@ Utah	L 108–114	Nikola Jokić (28)	Nikola Jokić (21)	Nikola Jokić (6)	Vivint Smart Home Arena; 18,306	31–15
47	January 25	Phoenix	W 132–95	Paul Millsap (20)	Paul Millsap (9)	Mason Plumlee (6)	Pepsi Center; 17,425	32–15
48	January 26	Philadelphia	W 126–110	Nikola Jokić (32)	Nikola Jokić (18)	Nikola Jokić (10)	Pepsi Center; 19,673	33–15
49	January 28	@ Memphis	W 95–92	Nikola Jokić (24)	Mason Plumlee (7)	Harris, Jokić, Beasley (3)	FedExForum; 12,917	34–15
50	January 30	@ New Orleans	W 105–99	Malik Beasley (22)	Nikola Jokić (13)	Nikola Jokić (10)	Smoothie King Center; 14,211	35–15

February : 7–4 (home: 5–1; road: 2–3)

Game	Date	Team	Score	High points	High rebounds	High assists	Location Attendance	Record
51	February 1	Houston	W 136–122	Malik Beasley (35)	Nikola Jokić (13)	Nikola Jokić (9)	Pepsi Center; 20,106	36–15
52	February 2	@ Minnesota	W 107–106	Malik Beasley (22)	Nikola Jokić (16)	Jokić, Morris (10)	Target Center; 17,208	37–15
53	February 4	@ Detroit	L 103–129	Trey Lyles (20)	Mason Plumlee (11)	Will Barton (7)	Little Caesars Arena; 12,589	37–16
54	February 6	@ Brooklyn	L 130–135	Nikola Jokić (25)	Nikola Jokić (14)	Jamal Murray (11)	Barclays Center; 14,516	37–17
55	February 8	@ Philadelphia	L 110–117	Nikola Jokić (27)	Nikola Jokić (10)	Nikola Jokić (10)	Wells Fargo Center; 20,627	37–18
56	February 11	Miami	W 103–87	Nikola Jokić (23)	Nikola Jokić (12)	Monté Morris (7)	Pepsi Center; 18,378	38–18
57	February 13	Sacramento	W 120–118	Paul Millsap (25)	Nikola Jokić (18)	Nikola Jokić (11)	Pepsi Center; 17,938	39–18
All-Star Break
58	February 22	@ Dallas	W 114–104	Nikola Jokić (19)	Jokić & Millsap (13)	Nikola Jokić (8)	American Airlines Center; 20,382	40–18
59	February 24	L.A. Clippers	W 123–96	Nikola Jokić (22)	Jokić & Millsap (16)	Jamal Murray (6)	Pepsi Center; 19,956	41–18
60	February 26	Oklahoma City	W 121–112	Nikola Jokić (36)	Paul Millsap (10)	Nikola Jokić (10)	Pepsi Center; 18,378	42–18
61	February 28	Utah	L 104–111	Murray & Barton (21)	Jokić & Barton (13)	Nikola Jokić (7)	Pepsi Center; 19,520	42–19

March : 9–6 (home: 4–2; road: 5–4)

Game	Date	Team	Score	High points	High rebounds	High assists	Location Attendance	Record
62	March 2	New Orleans	L 112–120	Murray & Jokić (20)	Nikola Jokić (9)	Nikola Jokić (7)	Pepsi Center; 19,155	42–20
63	March 4	@ San Antonio	L 103–104	Jamal Murray (25)	Paul Millsap (11)	Jamal Murray (8)	AT&T Center; 18,354	42–21
64	March 6	@ L.A. Lakers	W 115–99	Will Barton (23)	Nikola Jokić (17)	Nikola Jokić (8)	Staples Center; 18,997	43–21
65	March 8	@ Golden State	L 105–122	Morris & Beasley (17)	Mason Plumlee (12)	Monté Morris (6)	Oracle Arena; 19,596	43–22
66	March 12	Minnesota	W 133–107	Jamal Murray (30)	Nikola Jokić (8)	Mason Plumlee (8)	Pepsi Center; 16,874	44–22
67	March 14	Dallas	W 100–99	Paul Millsap (33)	Nikola Jokić (14)	Nikola Jokić (8)	Pepsi Center; 19,520	45–22
68	March 16	Indiana	W 102–100	Nikola Jokić (26)	Paul Millsap (13)	Jokić & Barton & Plumlee (5)	Pepsi Center; 19,856	46–22
69	March 18	@ Boston	W 114–105	Nikola Jokić (21)	Nikola Jokić (13)	Nikola Jokić (7)	TD Garden; 18,624	47–22
70	March 21	@ Washington	W 113–108	five players (15)	Mason Plumlee (11)	Nikola Jokić (11)	Capital One Arena; 15,986	48–22
71	March 22	@ New York	W 111–93	Nikola Jokić (21)	Nikola Jokić (17)	Murray & Jokić (5)	Madison Square Garden; 19,290	49–22
72	March 24	@ Indiana	L 88–124	Nikola Jokić (19)	Nikola Jokić (11)	Nikola Jokić (8)	Bankers Life Fieldhouse; 17,923	49–23
73	March 26	Detroit	W 95–92	Jamal Murray (33)	Nikola Jokić (15)	Murray, Millsap (5)	Pepsi Center; 19,520	50–23
74	March 28	@ Houston	L 85–112	Jamal Murray (20)	Nikola Jokić (8)	Nikola Jokić (6)	Toyota Center; 18,055	50–24
75	March 29	@ Oklahoma City	W 115–105	Jamal Murray (27)	Nikola Jokić (16)	Jamal Murray (9)	Chesapeake Energy Arena; 18,203	51–24
76	March 31	Washington	L 90–95	Nikola Jokić (23)	Paul Millsap (13)	Jokić & Barton (4)	Pepsi Center; 17,356	51–25

April : 3–3 (home: 3–0; road: 0–3)

Game	Date	Team	Score	High points	High rebounds	High assists	Location Attendance	Record
77	April 2	@ Golden State	L 102–116	Jamal Murray (17)	Paul Millsap (8)	Nikola Jokić (5)	Oracle Arena; 19,596	51–26
78	April 3	San Antonio	W 113–85	Nikola Jokic (20)	Nikola Jokic (11)	Jamal Murray (11)	Pepsi Center; 17,643	52–26
79	April 5	Portland	W 119–110	Paul Millsap (25)	Nikola Jokic (13)	Nikola Jokic (9)	Pepsi Center; 19,928	53–26
80	April 7	@ Portland	L 108–115	Gary Harris (18)	Mason Plumlee (11)	Mason Plumlee (6)	Moda Center; 19,890	53–27
81	April 9	@ Utah	L 108–118	Malik Beasley (25)	Mason Plumlee (8)	Mason Plumlee (6)	Vivint Smart Home Arena; 18,306	53–28
82	April 10	Minnesota	W 99–95	Nikola Jokic (29)	Nikola Jokic (14)	Jamal Murray (7)	Pepsi Center; 16,332	54–28

2018–19 season schedule

== Playoffs ==
=== Game log ===
2019 playoff game log
First Round: 4–3 (home: 3–1; road: 1–2)

Game	Date	Team	Score	High points	High rebounds	High assists	Location Attendance	Series
1	April 13	San Antonio	L 96–101	Gary Harris (20)	Nikola Jokić (14)	Nikola Jokić (14)	Pepsi Center; 19,520	0–1
2	April 16	San Antonio	W 114–105	Jamal Murray (24)	Nikola Jokić (13)	Nikola Jokić (8)	Pepsi Center; 19,520	1–1
3	April 18	@ San Antonio	L 108–118	Nikola Jokić (22)	Malik Beasley (9)	Harris, Jokić, Morris (7)	AT&T Center; 18,354	1–2
4	April 20	@ San Antonio	W 117–103	Nikola Jokić (29)	Nikola Jokić (12)	Nikola Jokić (8)	AT&T Center; 18,354	2–2
5	April 23	San Antonio	W 108–90	Jamal Murray (24)	Nikola Jokić (13)	Nikola Jokić (8)	Pepsi Center; 19,520	3–2
6	April 25	@ San Antonio	L 103–120	Nikola Jokić (43)	Nikola Jokić (12)	Nikola Jokić (9)	AT&T Center; 18,354	3–3
7	April 27	San Antonio	W 90–86	Jamal Murray (23)	Nikola Jokić (15)	Nikola Jokić (10)	Pepsi Center; 19,725	4–3

Conference Semifinals: 3–4 (home: 2–2; road: 1–2)

Game	Date	Team	Score	High points	High rebounds	High assists	Location Attendance	Series
1	April 29	Portland	W 121–113	Nikola Jokić (37)	Nikola Jokić (9)	Jamal Murray (8)	Pepsi Center; 19,520	1–0
2	May 1	Portland	L 90–97	Nikola Jokić (16)	Nikola Jokić (14)	Nikola Jokić (7)	Pepsi Center; 19,520	1–1
3	May 3	@ Portland	L 137–140 (4OT)	Jamal Murray (34)	Nikola Jokić (18)	Nikola Jokić (14)	Moda Center; 20,193	1–2
4	May 5	@ Portland	W 116–112	Jamal Murray (34)	Nikola Jokić (12)	Nikola Jokić (11)	Moda Center; 20,146	2–2
5	May 7	Portland	W 124–98	Nikola Jokić (25)	Nikola Jokić (19)	Jamal Murray (9)	Pepsi Center; 19,520	3–2
6	May 9	@ Portland	L 108–119	Nikola Jokić (29)	Nikola Jokić (12)	Nikola Jokić (8)	Moda Center; 20,022	3–3
7	May 12	Portland	L 96–100	Nikola Jokić (29)	Nikola Jokić (13)	Jamal Murray (5)	Pepsi Center; 19,520	3–4

2019 playoff schedule

== Player statistics ==
Legend
GP	Games played	GS	Games started	MPG	Minutes per game
FG%	Field-goal percentage	3P%	3-point field-goal percentage	FT%	Free-throw percentage
RPG	Rebounds per game	APG	Assists per game	SPG	Steals per game
BPG	Blocks per game	PPG	Points per game

=== Regular season ===
Denver Nuggets statistics
Player	GP	GS	MPG	FG%	3P%	FT%	RPG	APG	SPG	BPG	PPG
DeVaughn Akoon-Purcell	7	0	3.1	.300	.000	.500	.6	.9	.3	.0	1.0
Will Barton	43	38	27.7	.402	.342	.770	4.6	2.9	.4	.5	11.5
Malik Beasley	81	18	23.2	.474	.402	.848	2.5	1.2	.7	.1	11.3
Torrey Craig	75	37	20.0	.442	.324	.700	3.5	1.0	.5	.6	5.7
Brandon Goodwin	16	0	3.6	.261	.333	.818	.2	.9	.0	.0	1.4
Gary Harris	57	48	28.8	.424	.339	.799	2.8	2.2	1.0	.3	12.9
Juan Hernangómez	70	25	19.4	.439	.365	.767	3.8	.8	.4	.3	5.8
Nikola Jokić	80	80	31.3	.511	.307	.821	10.8	7.3	1.4	.7	20.1
Tyler Lydon	25	0	3.8	.500	.400	.333	.7	.2	.1	.0	.9
Trey Lyles	64	2	17.5	.418	.255	.698	3.8	1.4	.5	.4	8.5
Paul Millsap	70	65	27.1	.484	.365	.727	7.2	2.0	1.2	.8	12.6
Monté Morris	82	6	24.0	.493	.414	.802	2.4	3.6	.9	.0	10.4
Jamal Murray	75	74	32.6	.437	.367	.848	4.2	4.8	.9	.4	18.2
Mason Plumlee	82	17	21.1	.593	.200	.561	6.4	3.0	.8	.9	7.8
Isaiah Thomas	12	0	15.1	.343	.279	.630	1.1	1.9	.4	.1	8.1
Jarred Vanderbilt	17	0	4.1	.474	.000	.600	1.4	.2	.4	.1	1.4
Thomas Welsh	11	0	3.3	.538	.429	.500	.4	.5	.0	.0	1.6
Nick Young	4	0	9.3	.333	.375	.000	.3	.5	.0	.3	2.3

=== Playoffs ===
Denver Nuggets statistics
Player	GP	GS	MPG	FG%	3P%	FT%	RPG	APG	SPG	BPG	PPG
Will Barton	14	3	23.4	.348	.273	.692	4.8	1.7	.3	.6	9.1
Malik Beasley	14	0	20.1	.387	.404	.710	3.4	1.0	.2	.1	8.1
Torrey Craig	14	11	23.6	.478	.472	.563	5.1	.9	.5	.4	6.6
Gary Harris	14	14	37.0	.462	.351	.868	4.1	2.3	.9	.6	14.2
Juan Hernangómez	5	0	2.9	.333	.500	.000	.6	.0	.0	.0	.6
Nikola Jokić	14	14	39.7	.506	.393	.846	13.0	8.4	1.1	.9	25.1
Trey Lyles	3	0	2.7	.000	.000	.000	.3	.7	.0	.0	.0
Paul Millsap	14	14	33.5	.468	.316	.770	6.7	.8	.9	1.1	14.6
Monté Morris	14	0	16.0	.384	.000	.692	1.4	2.6	.4	.1	5.4
Jamal Murray	14	14	36.3	.425	.337	.903	4.4	4.7	1.0	.1	21.3
Mason Plumlee	14	0	15.6	.511	.000	.571	4.4	1.5	.5	.7	4.6
Jarred Vanderbilt	3	0	1.6	.000	.000	.000	.3	.0	.0	.3	.0

== Transactions ==
=== Trades ===
June 21, 2018	To Denver Nuggets Draft rights to Jarred Vanderbilt	To Orlando Magic Draft rights to Justin Jackson; 2019 second-round pick
July 6, 2018	To Denver Nuggets Cash considerations	To Philadelphia 76ers Wilson Chandler; 2021 second-round pick Right to swap 2022 second-round picks
July 13, 2018	To Denver Nuggets Isaiah Whitehead	To Brooklyn Nets Kenneth Faried; Darrell Arthur; 2019 first-round pick 2020 second-round pick

=== Contracts ===
==== Re-signed ====
Player	Signed
Will Barton	July 9, 2018
Nikola Jokić	July 9, 2018
Torrey Craig	July 10, 2018
Monté Morris	July 25, 2018

==== Additions ====
Player	Signed	Former Team
Isaiah Thomas	July 16, 2018	Los Angeles Lakers
Thomas Welsh	July 19, 2018; Two-way contract	UCLA Bruins
Emanuel Terry	August 7, 2018	Lincoln Memorial Railsplitters
DeVaughn Akoon-Purcell	August 7, 2018; Two-way contract	(Denmark) Bakken Bears
Brandon Goodwin	November 29, 2018; Injury hardship	(United States) Memphis Hustle
Nick Young	December 10, 2018; Injury hardship	Golden State Warriors
Brandon Goodwin	December 16, 2018; Two-way contract	(United States) Memphis Hustle

==== Subtractions ====
Player	Reason Left	New Team
Isaiah Whitehead	Waived	(Russia) Lokomotiv Kuban
Devin Harris	Free Agent	Dallas Mavericks
Emanuel Terry	Waived	(United States) Canton Charge
Brandon Goodwin	Waived	(United States) Memphis Hustle
DeVaughn Akoon-Purcell	Waived	(Israel) Hapeol Tel Aviv
Nick Young	Waived	Free Agent
