= 2018–19 Cleveland Cavaliers season =

Season of National Basketball Association team the Cleveland Cavaliers

- Head coach: Tyronn Lue (fired); Larry Drew (interim) (fired on April 11, 2019)
- General manager: Koby Altman
- Owner: Dan Gilbert
- Arena: Quicken Loans Arena

Results
- Record: 19–63 (.232)
- Place: Division: 5th (Central); Conference: 14th (Eastern)
- Playoff finish: Did not qualify
- Stats at Basketball Reference

Local media
- Television: Fox Sports Ohio
- Radio: WTAM; WMMS

The 2018–19 Cleveland Cavaliers season was the 49th season of the franchise in the National Basketball Association (NBA). The Cavaliers entered the season as the four-time defending Eastern Conference champion, and were coming off of an NBA Finals loss, in which they were swept by the Golden State Warriors in four games, the first Finals sweep since 2007, in which the Cavs were also swept, by the San Antonio Spurs. The Cavaliers had the worst team defensive rating in the NBA.

LeBron James was not on the roster for the first time since 2013-14, as he signed with the Los Angeles Lakers in the offseason as a free agent, his second time leaving his hometown team after doing so in 2010 to join the Miami Heat.

On October 28, 2018, the Cavaliers fired Tyronn Lue after a 0–6 start (the worst start for a team coming off the NBA Finals) and replaced him on the interim basis with his assistant Larry Drew, who would become permanent coach on November 5.

Without LeBron James, as with the 2010–11 season (James' first departure from Cleveland), the Cavaliers struggled to find a solid identity, ranking in the bottom 10 in all of points per game, opponent points per game, pace, offensive rating, and defensive rating. They finished at 19–63, the third worst record in the league, second worst in the Eastern Conference, and their worst season since 2010–11. This was also the Cavs' first losing season since the 2013–14 season.

== Draft ==
Round	Pick	Player	Position	Nationality	College / Club
1	8	Collin Sexton	PG	United States	Alabama

The Cavaliers entered the 2018 NBA draft with the rights to the eighth overall pick, which originally belonged to the Brooklyn Nets. Cleveland acquired the pick from the Boston Celtics in the Kyrie Irving trade during the summer of 2017. The Cavaliers used the pick to acquire point guard Collin Sexton, a freshman out of the University of Alabama.

== Preseason summary ==
On July 1, 2018, LeBron James confirmed that he would be leaving the Cavaliers and signing a four-year, $154 million contract with the Los Angeles Lakers. This marked the second time in which James left the Cavaliers in free agency, with the first coming when James joined the Miami Heat in 2010.

== Roster ==
2018–19 Cleveland Cavaliers roster
Players

Pos.	No.	Player	Height	Weight	DOB	From
F	32	Deng Adel (TW)	6 ft 7 in (2.01 m)	200 lb (91 kg)	1997–02–01	Louisville
F	4	Jaron Blossomgame (TW)	6 ft 8 in (2.03 m)	220 lb (100 kg)	1993–09–16	Clemson
F	3	Marquese Chriss	6 ft 10 in (2.08 m)	240 lb (109 kg)	1996–07–02	Washington
G	8	Jordan Clarkson	6 ft 5 in (1.96 m)	194 lb (88 kg)	1992–06–07	Missouri
G	18	Matthew Dellavedova	6 ft 4 in (1.93 m)	200 lb (91 kg)	1990–09–08	Saint Mary's
F/C	9	Channing Frye	7 ft 0 in (2.13 m)	255 lb (116 kg)	1983–05–17	Arizona
F	31	John Henson	6 ft 11 in (2.11 m)	219 lb (99 kg)	1990–12–28	North Carolina
G	20	Brandon Knight	6 ft 3 in (1.91 m)	195 lb (88 kg)	1991–12–02	Kentucky
F/C	0	Kevin Love	6 ft 10 in (2.08 m)	251 lb (114 kg)	1988–09–07	UCLA
F	22	Larry Nance	6 ft 10 in (2.08 m)	230 lb (104 kg)	1993–01–01	Wyoming
G	12	David Nwaba	6 ft 4 in (1.93 m)	219 lb (99 kg)	1993–01–14	Cal Poly
F	16	Cedi Osman	6 ft 8 in (2.03 m)	230 lb (104 kg)	1995–04–08	Turkey
G	2	Collin Sexton	6 ft 2 in (1.88 m)	190 lb (86 kg)	1999–01–04	Alabama
G/F	5	J. R. Smith (L)	6 ft 6 in (1.98 m)	225 lb (102 kg)	1985–09–09	St. Benedict's Prep (NJ)
G	1	Nik Stauskas	6 ft 6 in (1.98 m)	205 lb (93 kg)	1993–10–07	Michigan
F/C	13	Tristan Thompson	6 ft 10 in (2.08 m)	254 lb (115 kg)	1991–03–13	Texas
C	41	Ante Žižić	6 ft 11 in (2.11 m)	266 lb (121 kg)	1997–01–04	Croatia

Coaches
Head coach
- Larry Drew
Assistant(s)
- Mike Longabardi (Assoc. HC)
- Dan Geriot
- Mike Gerrity
- Terry Nooner
- Andrew Olson (shooting)
- James Posey

Legend
- (DP) Unsigned draft pick
- (FA) Free agent
- (S) Suspended
- (GL) On assignment to G League affiliate
- (TW) Two-way affiliate player
- (L) On leave from the team
- Injured

Roster
Updated: 2019–02–11

== Standings ==
=== Division ===
Central Division	W	L	PCT	GB	Home	Road	Div	GP
z – Milwaukee Bucks	60	22	.732	–	33‍–‍8	27‍–‍14	14–2	82
x – Indiana Pacers	48	34	.585	12.0	29‍–‍12	19‍–‍22	11–5	82
x – Detroit Pistons	41	41	.500	19.0	26‍–‍15	15‍–‍26	8–8	82
Chicago Bulls	22	60	.268	38.0	9‍–‍32	13‍–‍28	3–13	82
Cleveland Cavaliers	19	63	.232	41.0	13‍–‍28	6‍–‍35	4–12	82

=== Conference ===
Eastern Conference
#	Team	W	L	PCT	GB	GP
1	z – Milwaukee Bucks *	60	22	.732	–	82
2	y – Toronto Raptors *	58	24	.707	2.0	82
3	x – Philadelphia 76ers	51	31	.622	9.0	82
4	x – Boston Celtics	49	33	.598	11.0	82
5	x – Indiana Pacers	48	34	.585	12.0	82
6	x – Brooklyn Nets	42	40	.512	18.0	82
7	y – Orlando Magic *	42	40	.512	18.0	82
8	x – Detroit Pistons	41	41	.500	19.0	82
9	Charlotte Hornets	39	43	.476	21.0	82
10	Miami Heat	39	43	.476	21.0	82
11	Washington Wizards	32	50	.390	28.0	82
12	Atlanta Hawks	29	53	.354	31.0	82
13	Chicago Bulls	22	60	.268	38.0	82
14	Cleveland Cavaliers	19	63	.232	41.0	82
15	New York Knicks	17	65	.207	43.0	82

== Game log ==
=== Preseason ===
2018 preseason game log
Total: 2–2 (Home: 1–2; Road: 1–0)
Preseason: 2–2 (home: 1–2; road: 1–0)

Game	Date	Team	Score	High points	High rebounds	High assists	Location Attendance	Record
1	October 2	@ Boston	W 102–95	Kevin Love (17)	Osman, Nance Jr. (7)	Cedi Osman (4)	TD Garden; 18,624	1–0
2	October 6	Boston	W 113–102	Ante Zizic (20)	Osman, Clarkson (6)	Taylor, Osman, Clarkson (3)	Quicken Loans Arena; 17,083	2–0
3	October 8	Indiana	L 102–111	Kyle Korver (17)	Thompson, Nance Jr. (7)	George Hill (5)	Quicken Loans Arena; 16,330	2–1
4	October 12	Detroit	L 110–129	Rodney Hood (21)	Tristan Thompson (9)	Collin Sexton (5)	Breslin Student Events Center; 7,517	2–2

2018–19 season schedule

=== Regular season ===
2018–19 game log
Total: 19–63 (Home: 13–28; Road: 6–35)
October: 1–6 (home: 1–3; road: 0–3)

Game	Date	Team	Score	High points	High rebounds	High assists	Location Attendance	Record
1	October 17	@ Toronto	L 104–116	Kevin Love (21)	Tristan Thompson (13)	George Hill (7)	Scotiabank Arena; 19,915	0–1
2	October 19	@ Minnesota	L 123–131	Kevin Love (25)	Kevin Love (19)	Cedi Osman (8)	Target Center; 18,978	0–2
3	October 21	Atlanta	L 111–133	Jordan Clarkson (19)	Kevin Love (17)	Cedi Osman (4)	Quicken Loans Arena; 19,432	0–3
4	October 24	Brooklyn	L 86–102	Love, Sexton, Clarkson (14)	Tristan Thompson (12)	Thompson, Nance Jr. (4)	Quicken Loans Arena; 19,432	0–4
5	October 25	@ Detroit	L 103–110	Kyle Korver (21)	Osman, Nance Jr. (6)	Sexton, Nance Jr. (5)	Little Caesars Arena; 15,896	0–5
6	October 27	Indiana	L 107–119	Rodney Hood (17)	Larry Nance Jr. (12)	Sexton, Nance Jr. (4)	Quicken Loans Arena; 19,432	0–6
7	October 30	Atlanta	W 136–114	Rodney Hood (26)	Tristan Thompson (13)	Sam Dekker (4)	Quicken Loans Arena; 19,432	1–6

November : 3–11 (home: 2–4; road: 1–7)

Game	Date	Team	Score	High points	High rebounds	High assists	Location Attendance	Record
8	November 1	Denver	L 91–110	Jordan Clarkson (17)	Tristan Thompson (7)	Thompson, Hood (4)	Quicken Loans Arena; 19,432	1–7
9	November 3	@ Charlotte	L 94–126	J.R. Smith (14)	Tristan Thompson (8)	Hill, Smith, Korver (4)	Spectrum Center; 16,221	1–8
10	November 5	@ Orlando	L 100–102	George Hill (22)	Tristan Thompson (16)	George Hill (6)	Amway Center; 15,009	1–9
11	November 7	Oklahoma City	L 86–95	Collin Sexton (15)	Tristan Thompson (15)	Jordan Clarkson (8)	Quicken Loans Arena; 19,432	1–10
12	November 10	@ Chicago	L 98–99	Tristan Thompson (22)	Larry Nance Jr. (14)	Jordan Clarkson (4)	United Center; 21,506	1–11
13	November 13	Charlotte	W 113–89	Jordan Clarkson (24)	Tristan Thompson (21)	Smith, Thompson (5)	Quicken Loans Arena; 19,432	2–11
14	November 14	@ Washington	L 95–119	Collin Sexton (24)	David Nwaba (7)	Larry Nance Jr. (5)	Capital One Arena; 14,537	2–12
15	November 19	@ Detroit	L 102–113	Collin Sexton (18)	Tristan Thompson (7)	Sexton, Clarkson (4)	Little Caesars Arena; 15,769	2–13
16	November 21	LA Lakers	L 105–109	Cedi Osman (21)	Tristan Thompson (15)	Clarkson, Nance Jr. (5)	Quicken Loans Arena; 19,432	2–14
17	November 23	@ Philadelphia	W 121–112	Rodney Hood (25)	Tristan Thompson (13)	Andrew Harrison (5)	Wells Fargo Center; 20,524	3–14
18	November 24	Houston	W 117–108	Collin Sexton (29)	Tristan Thompson (20)	Jordan Clarkson (4)	Quicken Loans Arena; 19,432	4–14
19	November 26	Minnesota	L 95–102	Kyle Korver (22)	Tristan Thompson (11)	Larry Nance Jr. (7)	Quicken Loans Arena; 19,432	4–15
20	November 28	@ Oklahoma City	L 83–100	Collin Sexton (21)	Nance Jr., Osman, Sexton (10)	Cedi Osman (6)	Chesapeake Energy Arena; 18,203	4–16
21	November 30	@ Boston	L 95–128	Jordan Clarkson (16)	Tristan Thompson (12)	Burks, Thompson, Sexton (4)	TD Garden; 18,624	4–17

December : 4–12 (home: 2–6; road: 2–6)

Game	Date	Team	Score	High points	High rebounds	High assists	Location Attendance	Record
22	December 1	Toronto	L 95–106	Clarkson, Thompson (18)	Tristan Thompson (19)	Osman, Thompson (3)	Quicken Loans Arena; 19,432	4–18
23	December 3	@ Brooklyn	W 99–97	Jordan Clarkson (20)	Tristan Thompson (14)	Jordan Clarkson (4)	Barclays Center; 10,983	5–18
24	December 5	Golden State	L 105–129	Collin Sexton (21)	Tristan Thompson (19)	Hill, Thompson, Clarkson, Sexton (3)	Quicken Loans Arena; 19,432	5–19
25	December 7	Sacramento	L 110–129	Jordan Clarkson (26)	Burks, Nance Jr. (7)	Alec Burks (9)	Quicken Loans Arena; 19,432	5–20
26	December 8	Washington	W 116–101	Collin Sexton (29)	Tristan Thompson (19)	Larry Nance Jr. (7)	Quicken Loans Arena; 19,432	6–20
27	December 10	@ Milwaukee	L 92–108	Larry Nance Jr. (16)	Jaron Blossomgame (10)	Cedi Osman (6)	Fiserv Forum; 17,155	6–21
28	December 12	NY Knicks	W 113–106	Jordan Clarkson (28)	Larry Nance Jr. (11)	Larry Nance Jr. (7)	Quicken Loans Arena; 19,432	7–21
29	December 14	Milwaukee	L 102–114	Jordan Clarkson (23)	Larry Nance Jr. (10)	Larry Nance Jr. (6)	Quicken Loans Arena; 19,432	7–22
30	December 16	Philadelphia	L 105–128	Osman, Clarkson (18)	Jordan Clarkson (6)	Matthew Dellavedova (7)	Quicken Loans Arena; 19,432	7–23
31	December 18	@ Indiana	W 92–91	Rodney Hood (17)	Larry Nance Jr. (16)	Larry Nance Jr. (6)	Bankers Life Fieldhouse; 15,630	8–23
32	December 19	@ Charlotte	L 99–110	Jordan Clarkson (20)	Larry Nance Jr. (15)	Larry Nance Jr. (7)	Spectrum Center; 15,179	8–24
33	December 21	@ Toronto	L 110–126	Jordan Clarkson (20)	Larry Nance Jr. (12)	Matthew Dellavedova (7)	Scotiabank Arena; 19,800	8–25
34	December 23	Chicago	L 92–112	Larry Nance Jr. (20)	Cedi Osman (7)	Burks, Sexton (3)	Quicken Loans Arena; 19,432	8–26
35	December 26	@ Memphis	L 87–95	Jordan Clarkson (24)	Ante Zizic (11)	Collin Sexton (6)	FedExForum; 16,424	8–27
36	December 28	@ Miami	L 94–118	Jordan Clarkson (18)	Jaron Blossomgame (10)	Alec Burks (5)	American Airlines Arena; 19,617	8–28
37	December 29	@ Atlanta	L 108–111	Cedi Osman (22)	Larry Nance Jr. (15)	Larry Nance Jr. (7)	State Farm Arena; 16,460	8–29

January : 3–12 (home: 1–6; road: 2–6)

Game	Date	Team	Score	High points	High rebounds	High assists	Location Attendance	Record
38	January 2	Miami	L 92–117	Tristan Thompson (14)	Larry Nance Jr. (5)	Larry Nance Jr. (6)	Quicken Loans Arena; 19,432	8–30
39	January 4	Utah	L 91–117	Alec Burks (17)	Tristan Thompson (12)	Frye, Sexton (3)	Quicken Loans Arena; 19,432	8–31
40	January 5	New Orleans	L 98–133	Jordan Clarkson (23)	Tristan Thompson (11)	Alec Burks (6)	Quicken Loans Arena; 19,432	8–32
41	January 8	Indiana	L 115–123	Jordan Clarkson (26)	Tristan Thompson (13)	Thompson, Dellavedova (5)	Quicken Loans Arena; 19,432	8–33
42	January 9	@ New Orleans	L 124–140	Jordan Clarkson (21)	Tristan Thompson (10)	Matthew Dellavedova (7)	Smoothie King Center; 15,058	8–34
43	January 11	@ Houston	L 113–141	Ante Zizic (18)	Ante Zizic (8)	Payne, Sexton (5)	Toyota Center; 18,055	8–35
44	January 13	@ LA Lakers	W 101–95	Cedi Osman (20)	Tristan Thompson (14)	Alec Burks (4)	Staples Center; 18,997	9–35
45	January 16	@ Portland	L 112–129	Jordan Clarkson (22)	Jaron Blossomgame (10)	Matthew Dellavedova (6)	Moda Center; 19,089	9–36
46	January 18	@ Utah	L 99–115	Zizic, Sexton (15)	Ante Zizic (10)	Dellavedova, Payne (3)	Vivint Smart Home Arena; 18,306	9–37
47	January 19	@ Denver	L 102–124	Ante Zizic (23)	Ante Zizic (6)	Collin Sexton (7)	Pepsi Center; 19,520	9–38
48	January 21	Chicago	L 88–104	Collin Sexton (18)	Ante Zizic (9)	Jordan Clarkson (4)	Quicken Loans Arena; 19,432	9–39
49	January 23	@ Boston	L 103–123	Cedi Osman (25)	Alec Burks (9)	Alec Burks (6)	TD Garden; 18,624	9–40
50	January 25	Miami	L 94–100	Cedi Osman (29)	Ante Zizic (9)	Matthew Dellavedova (5)	Quicken Loans Arena; 19,432	9–41
51	January 27	@ Chicago	W 104–101	Clarkson, Burks (18)	Ante Zizic (14)	Jordan Clarkson (6)	United Center; 19,675	10–41
52	January 29	Washington	W 116–113	Cedi Osman (26)	Ante Zizic (12)	Alec Burks (9)	Quicken Loans Arena; 19,432	11–41

February : 4–6 (home: 3–4; road: 1–2)

Game	Date	Team	Score	High points	High rebounds	High assists	Location Attendance	Record
53	February 2	Dallas	L 98–111	Jordan Clarkson (19)	Larry Nance Jr. (12)	Alec Burks (5)	Quicken Loans Arena; 19,432	11–42
54	February 5	Boston	L 96–103	Collin Sexton (25)	Zizic, Nance Jr. (12)	Matthew Dellavedova (4)	Quicken Loans Arena; 19,432	11–43
55	February 8	@ Washington	L 106–119	Collin Sexton (27)	Larry Nance Jr. (19)	Larry Nance Jr. (6)	Capital One Arena; 16,682	11–44
56	February 9	@ Indiana	L 90–105	Jordan Clarkson (18)	Larry Nance Jr. (10)	Jordan Clarkson (6)	Bankers Life Fieldhouse; 17,923	11–45
57	February 11	NY Knicks	W 107–104	Collin Sexton (20)	Larry Nance Jr. (16)	Matthew Dellavedova (6)	Quicken Loans Arena; 19,432	12–45
58	February 13	Brooklyn	L 139–148 (3OT)	Jordan Clarkson (42)	Larry Nance Jr. (14)	Matthew Dellavedova (13)	Quicken Loans Arena; 17,434	12–46
59	February 21	Phoenix	W 111–98	Cedi Osman (19)	Ante Zizic (12)	Matthew Dellavedova (11)	Quicken Loans Arena; 19,022	13–46
60	February 23	Memphis	W 112–107	Kevin Love (32)	Kevin Love (12)	Matthew Dellavedova (6)	Quicken Loans Arena; 19,432	14–46
61	February 25	Portland	L 110–123	Cedi Osman (27)	Kevin Love (12)	Dellavedova, Nance Jr. (5)	Quicken Loans Arena; 19,432	14–47
62	February 28	@ NY Knicks	W 125–118	Kevin Love (26)	Kevin Love (8)	Cedi Osman (5)	Madison Square Garden; 17,573	15–47

March : 4–11 (home: 4–3; road: 0–8)

Game	Date	Team	Score	High points	High rebounds	High assists	Location Attendance	Record
63	March 2	Detroit	L 93–129	Collin Sexton (16)	Nwaba, Nance Jr. (5)	Clarkson, Nance Jr. (3)	Quicken Loans Arena; 19,432	15–48
64	March 3	Orlando	W 107–93	Jordan Clarkson (18)	Kevin Love (14)	Larry Nance Jr. (4)	Quicken Loans Arena; 19,432	16–48
65	March 6	@ Brooklyn	L 107–113	Kevin Love (24)	Kevin Love (16)	Collin Sexton (5)	Barclays Center; 14,177	16–49
66	March 8	@ Miami	L 110–126	Collin Sexton (27)	Ante Zizic (6)	Knight, Osman, Sexton (6)	AmericanAirlines Arena; 19,600	16–50
67	March 11	Toronto	W 126–101	Collin Sexton (28)	Kevin Love (18)	Cedi Osman (7)	Quicken Loans Arena; 19,432	17–50
68	March 12	@ Philadelphia	L 99–106	Collin Sexton (26)	David Nwaba (7)	Osman, Stauskas (4)	Wells Fargo Center; 20,420	17–51
69	March 14	@ Orlando	L 91–120	Collin Sexton (23)	Osman, Love, Zizic (8)	Cedi Osman (4)	Amway Center; 18,091	17–52
70	March 16	@ Dallas	L 116–121	Collin Sexton (28)	Kevin Love (12)	Osman, Love, Sexton (4)	American Airlines Center; 20,347	17–53
71	March 18	Detroit	W 126–119	Collin Sexton (27)	Marquese Chriss (10)	Cedi Osman (6)	Quicken Loans Arena; 18,465	18–53
72	March 20	Milwaukee	W 107–102	Collin Sexton (25)	Love, Zizic (10)	Larry Nance Jr. (5)	Quicken Loans Arena; 19,432	19–53
73	March 22	L. A. Clippers	L 108–110	Kevin Love (22)	Larry Nance Jr. (9)	Osman, Knight (3)	Quicken Loans Arena; 19,432	19–54
74	March 24	@ Milwaukee	L 105–127	Kevin Love (20)	Kevin Love (19)	Larry Nance Jr. (6)	Fiserv Forum; 17,930	19–55
75	March 26	Boston	L 106–116	Collin Sexton (24)	Kevin Love (11)	Larry Nance Jr. (7)	Quicken Loans Arena; 19,432	19–56
76	March 28	@ San Antonio	L 110–116	Collin Sexton (24)	Larry Nance Jr. (11)	Larry Nance Jr. (4)	AT&T Center; 18,756	19–57
77	March 30	@ L. A. Clippers	L 108–132	Jordan Clarkson (26)	Thompson, Nance Jr. (10)	Thompson, Osman, Sexton (4)	Staples Center; 16,439	19–58

April : 0–5 (home: 0–2; road: 0–3)

Game	Date	Team	Score	High points	High rebounds	High assists	Location Attendance	Record
78	April 1	@ Phoenix	L 113–122	Collin Sexton (21)	Larry Nance Jr. (12)	Larry Nance Jr. (4)	Talking Stick Resort Arena; 14,050	19–59
79	April 4	@ Sacramento	L 104–117	Jordan Clarkson (22)	Larry Nance Jr. (16)	Ante Zizic (4)	Golden 1 Center; 17,583	19–60
80	April 5	@ Golden State	L 114–120	Collin Sexton (27)	Larry Nance Jr. (14)	Clarkson, Sexton (4)	Oracle Arena; 19,596	19–61
81	April 7	San Antonio	L 90–112	Knight, Sexton (16)	Larry Nance Jr. (10)	Larry Nance Jr. (5)	Quicken Loans Arena; 19,432	19–62
82	April 9	Charlotte	L 97–124	Collin Sexton (18)	Larry Nance Jr. (12)	Collin Sexton (10)	Quicken Loans Arena; 19,432	19–63

2018–19 season schedule

== Player statistics ==
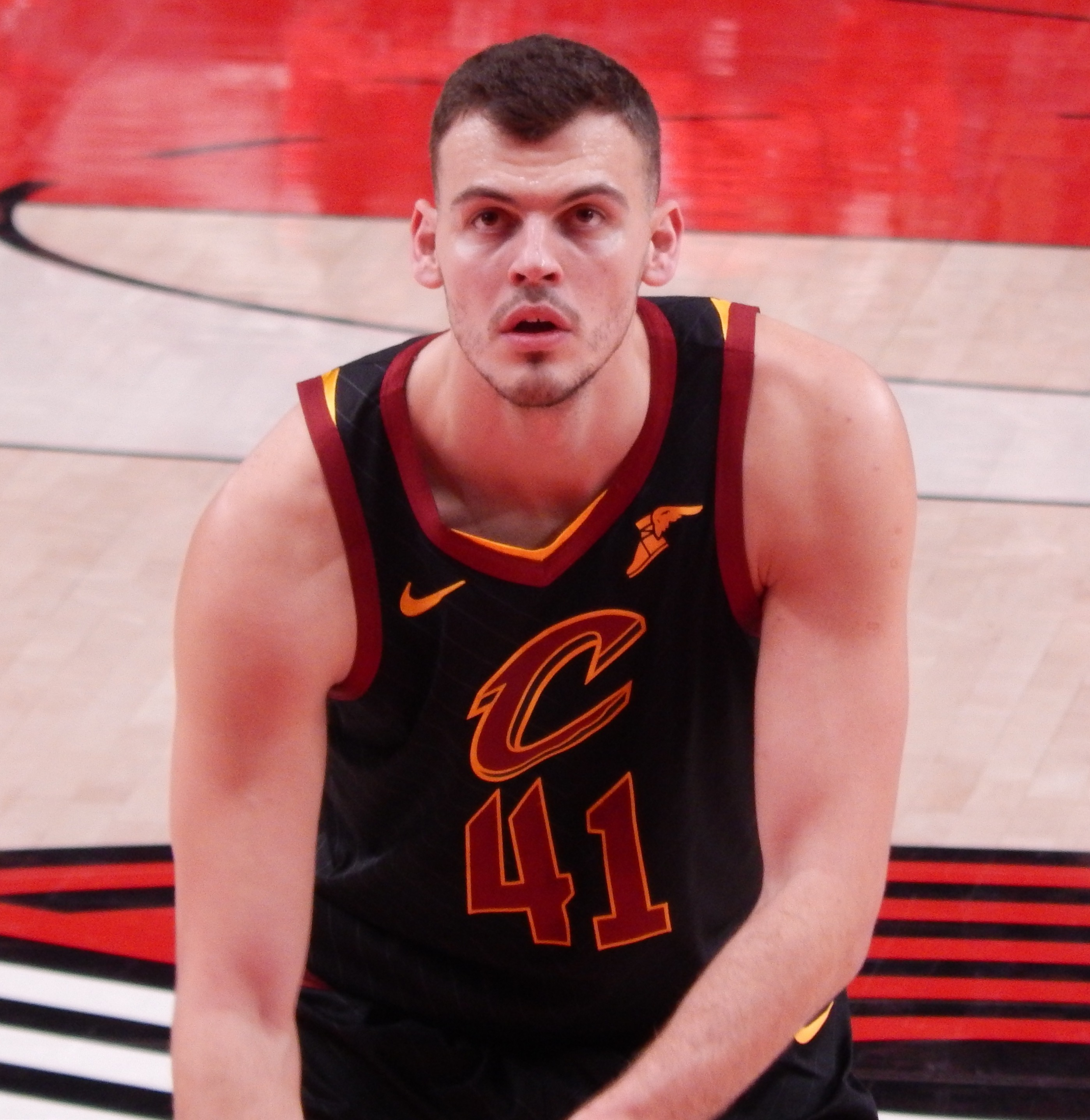
Ante Žižić

Player	Pos.	GP	GS	MP	Reb.	Ast.	Stl.	Blk.	Pts.
Deng Adel^{≠}	SF	19	3	194	19	5	1	4	32
Jaron Blossomgame^{≠}	SF	27	4	439	98	13	7	8	114
Alec Burks^{†}	SG	34	24	979	186	98	25	16	396
Marquese Chriss^{≠}	PF	27	2	395	114	16	15	7	153
Jordan Clarkson	SG	81	0	2,214	270	196	57	13	1,364
Sam Dekker^{†}	PF	9	5	169	33	9	11	0	57
Matthew Dellavedova	PG	36	0	715	67	152	12	2	262
Channing Frye	C	36	6	341	52	20	6	5	129
Andrew Harrison^{‡}	PG	10	0	144	15	17	4	2	43
George Hill^{†}	PG	13	13	344	27	36	12	1	140
John Holland^{‡}	SF	1	0	1	0	0	0	0	0
Rodney Hood^{†}	SG	45	45	1,234	112	92	38	5	547
Jalen Jones^{‡}	SF	16	0	214	34	7	9	2	81
Brandon Knight^{≠}	PG	27	26	618	50	62	19	2	230
Kyle Korver^{†}	PF	16	0	251	29	17	3	2	108
Kevin Love	PF	22	21	598	239	48	6	5	374
Patrick McCaw^{‡}	SG	3	0	53	3	2	2	0	5
Larry Nance	PF	67	30	1,795	552	214	100	40	627
David Nwaba	SG	51	14	984	163	54	36	17	334
Cedi Osman	SF	76	75	2,444	357	195	60	11	991
Cameron Payne^{≠}	PG	9	1	176	19	23	8	3	74
Collin Sexton	PG	82	72	13.0	236	243	44	6	1,371
Kobi Simmons^{‡}	PG	1	0	2	0	0	0	0	0
J. R. Smith	SG	11	4	222	18	21	11	3	74
Nik Stauskas^{†}	SG	24	0	342	47	19	7	3	132
Tristan Thompson	C	43	40	1,198	438	86	28	16	470
Ante Žižić	C	59	25	1,082	320	53	13	22	459

After all games.
^{‡}Waived during the season
^{†}Traded during the season
^{≠}Acquired during the season

== Transactions ==
=== Trades ===
August 7, 2018	To Cleveland Cavaliers Sam Dekker; Cash considerations Draft rights to Renaldas Seibutis	To Los Angeles Clippers Draft rights to Vladimir Veremeenko

=== Free agency ===
==== Re-signed ====
Player	Signed
Rodney Hood	September 10, 2018

==== Additions ====
Player	Signed	Former team
Billy Preston	Two-way contract	(Bosnia and Herzegovina) Igokea
Channing Frye	UFA	Los Angeles Lakers
David Nwaba	UFA	Chicago Bulls

==== Subtractions ====
Player	Reason left	New team
London Perrantes	Waived	(France) Limoges CSP
LeBron James	UFA	Los Angeles Lakers
Jeff Green	UFA	Washington Wizards
José Calderón	UFA	Detroit Pistons
Kendrick Perkins	Waived	TBA
Okaro White	Waived	Long Island Nets
