= Billy Garrett Jr. =

American basketball player (born 1994)

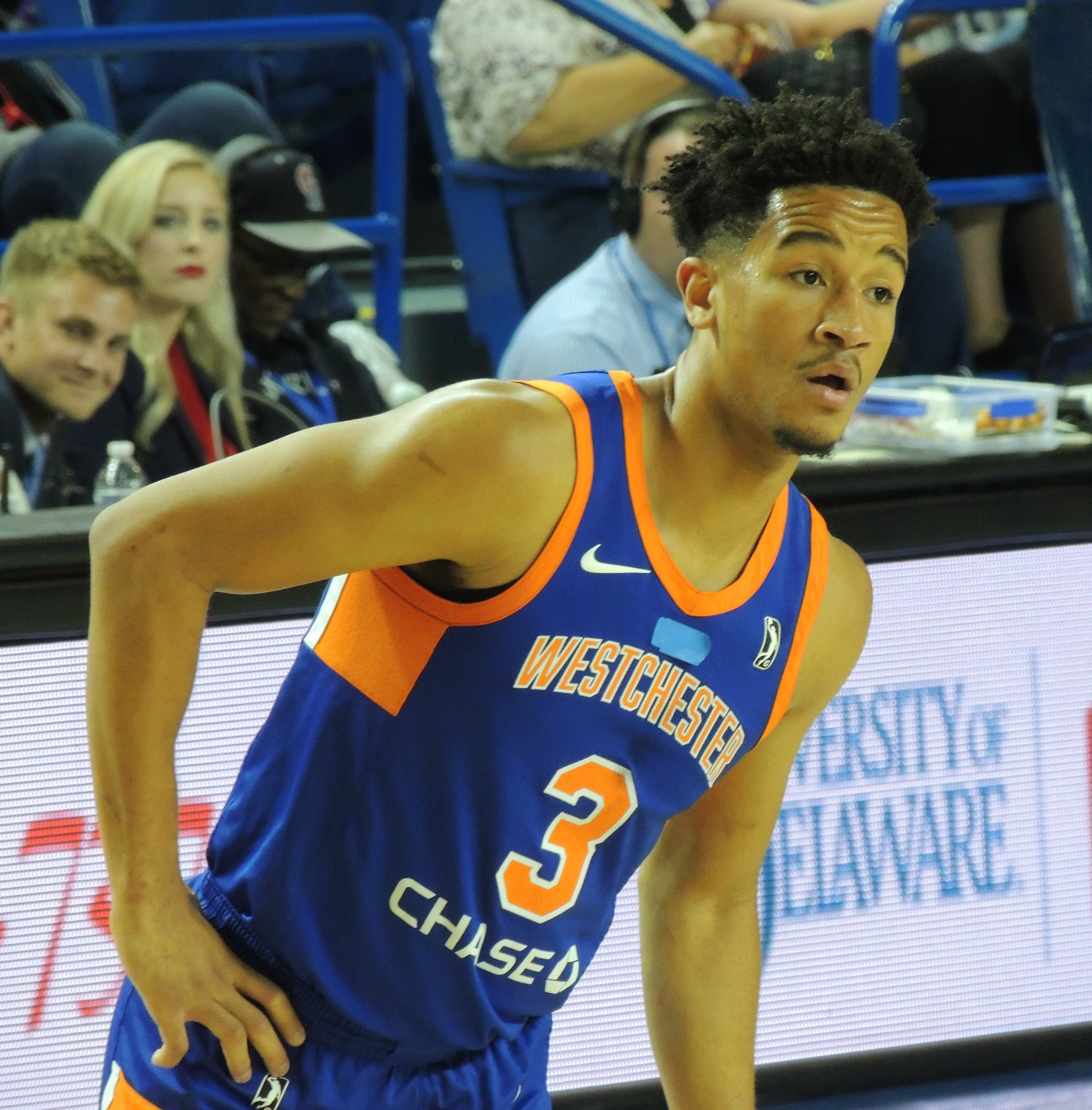
- Garrett with the Westchester Knicks in 2017

No. 3 – Freseros de Irapuato
- Position: Point guard
- League: LNBP

Personal information
- Born: October 16, 1994 (age 32) Chicago, Illinois, U.S.
- Listed height: 6 ft 6 in (1.98 m)
- Listed weight: 213 lb (97 kg)

Career information
- High school: Morgan Park (Chicago, Illinois)
- College: DePaul (2013–2017)
- NBA draft: 2017: undrafted
- Playing career: 2017–present

Career history
- 2017–2019: Westchester Knicks
- 2019: New York Knicks
- 2019: Élan Chalon
- 2020: Larisa
- 2021: Lakeland Magic
- 2021–2022: Czarni Słupsk
- 2022: Riesen Ludwigsburg
- 2022: Arka Gdynia
- 2022–2023: Legia Warsaw
- 2023-2024: Estela
- 2026-present: Freseros de Irapuato

Career highlights
- All-PLK Team (2022); NBA G League champion (2021); Big East Freshman of the Year (2014)
- Stats at NBA.com
- Stats at Basketball Reference

Billy Garrett Jr. (born October 16, 1994) is an American professional basketball player for CD Estela of the Primera FEB. He played briefly in the National Basketball Association (NBA) for the New York Knicks. He has also played professionally in the NBA G League as well as for teams in several international leagues. His professional highlights include a G League Championship in 2021 with the Lakeland Magic and All-PLK Team recognition in 2022.

Garrett Jr. played college basketball for DePaul, where he holds the record for career free throws made. He was the 2014 Big East Conference Men's Basketball Freshman of the Year and earned several collegiate honors for his performance in the classroom and in the community. In high school Garrett Jr. played for Morgan Park High School where he won Chicago Public High School League (CPL) and Illinois High School Association (IHSA) championships.

Garrett was the first person known to be afflicted with sickle cell disease to become an NBA player and has been an advocate and public speaker for the cause. Garrett is the grandson of Bill Garrett, who integrated Big Ten basketball.

== High school career ==
Billy Garrett Jr. is the son of Billy Garrett Sr. and Annissa Lambrith-Garrett. As a youth, Garrett Jr. played basketball, baseball and American football. Garrett's grandfather was Bill Garrett, the first African-American basketball player in the Big Ten. The younger Garrett attended Morgan Park High School. He committed to DePaul early in his high school career. Garrett achieved basketball success despite being "The only Division I basketball player afflicted with the "SC" form of sickle cell disease".

=== Freshman season (2009–10) ===
Before Garrett Jr.'s high school freshman season during the 2009 summer, his father, Billy Garrett Sr., was hired as an assistant coach at DePaul, and Garrett Sr. survived the 2010 transition from Jerry Wainwright to Oliver Purnell. As a freshman during the 2010 Chicago Public High School League, championship tournament, Garrett Jr. played well enough at times that defenses opted not to double-team Wayne Blackshear. The team went on to win the 2010 city championship over Marshall Metropolitan High School, with notable contributions from its freshman guards.

=== Sophomore season (2010–11) ===
As a sophomore, he was expected to continue to perform at a high enough level to "take some pressure off of Wayne Blackshear" when the Chicago Tribune ranked them as the number three team the Chicago metropolitan area. That year they found themselves matched up against a Jabari Parker-led Simeon Career Academy that was ranked number 3 in the nation by USA Today and number 1 in the state in the CPL championship second round, where they lost 52–45. In the 2011 IHSA Class 3A sectional semifinal against Hillcrest High School, Garrett scored 20 points, including 10 in the second quarter to help rally Morgan park from a 27–18 deficit. Following the season, Garrett Jr. committed to DePaul. At that time, he was ranked as the 7th best Chicago-area and 8th best Illinois recruit in the national class of 2013 as the number 92-ranked prospect.

=== Junior season (2011–12) ===
When Wayne Blackshear graduated in 2011, Garrett became the focal point of the team as a junior. He entered his junior season ranked by the Chicago Tribune as fifth among area players to watch. When Mac Irvin, "known as the 'Godfather' of Chicago basketball" died from diabetes complications in December 2011, Garrett Jr. delivered a eulogy. At the time, Garrett Jr. was described as a point guard in a shooting guard's body. In the December 2011 Proviso West Tournament, he posted 30 points in a 50–41 loss to New Trier High School on December 29. That season he was the only underclassman recognized as a 2012 Associated Press boys basketball Class 3A all-state first team selection (in a year where the Associated Press named several future NBA talents to its Class 4A first team — Jabari Parker, Fred VanVleet and Malcolm Hill — and second team — Jahlil Okafor and Kendrick Nunn). The Chicago Tribune named him third team All-state along with Sterling Brown, Milton Doyle, Tony Hicks and Rashaun Stimage. He finished the year as the sixth rated national class of 2013 recruit in Illinois at number 75 according to Rivals.com.

=== Senior season (2012–13) ===
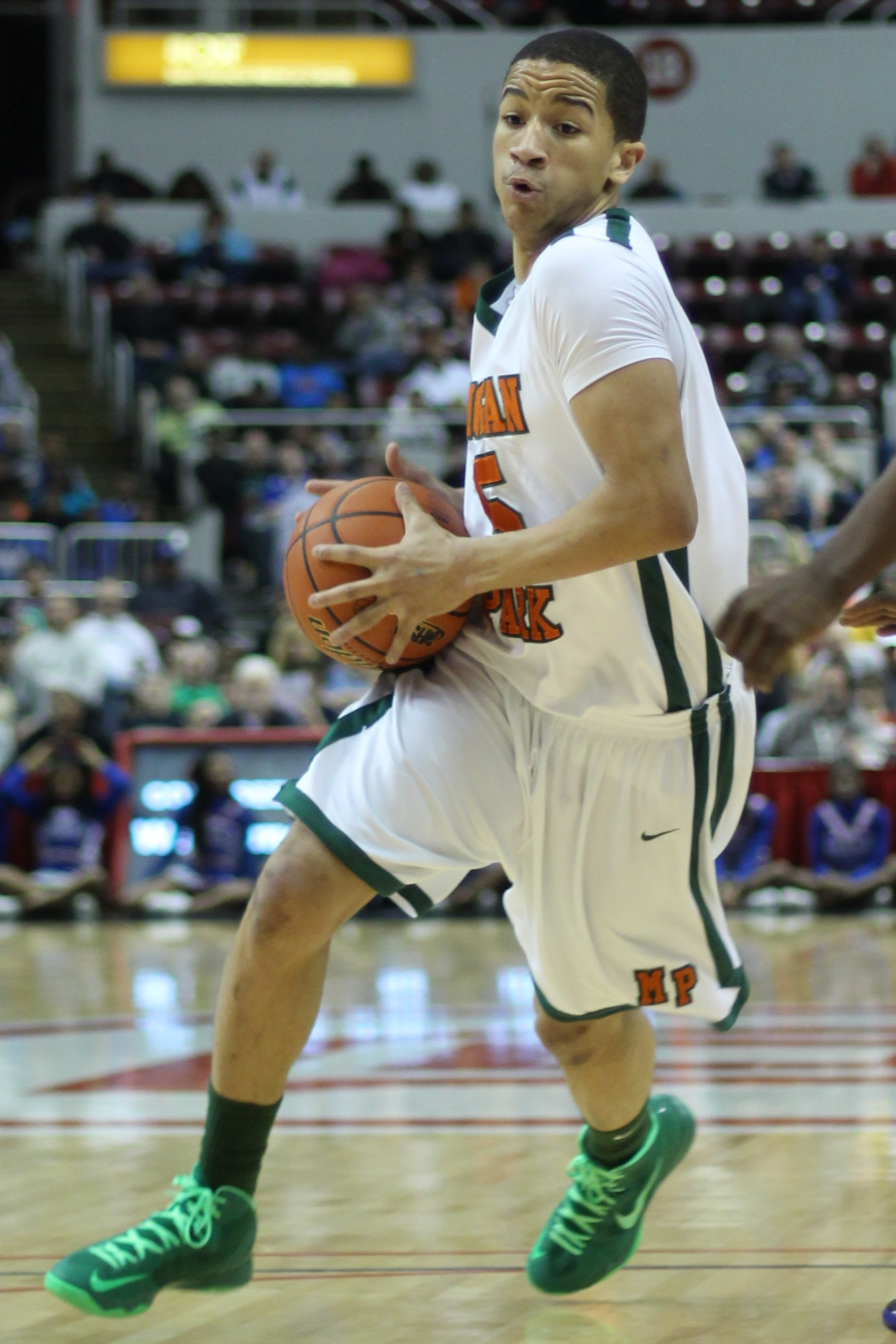
Garrett for Morgan Park High School in the 2013 IHSA 3A championship game.

Garrett entered his senior season as the 17th ranked point guard in the national class of 2013, according to Scout.com. His backup was 5 ft 9 in (1.75 m) freshman Charlie Moore, who entered the season rated as one of the top 5 underclassmen in the Chicago area and with NCAA Division I offers from Bradley and UMass. That season 6 ft 0 in (1.83 m) Dayton recruit Kyle Davis, who had been described as a shooting guard in a point guard's body, transferred from Hyde Park Academy High School to complement the 6 ft 5 in (1.96 m) Garrett.

Morgan Park's only loss in the 2012 portion of their schedule was at the hands of the sophomore season Stephen Zimmerman-led Bishop Gorman High School in an 83–80 overtime loss at the Tarkanian Classic in Las Vegas on December 21. Zimmerman tallied 24 points, 8 rebounds and 3 blocked shots. In the 2012 Proviso West Holiday tournament, Morgan Park defeated a sophomore year Jalen Brunson-led Stevenson High School with Davis defending against Brunson, who posted a game-high 17 in 67–52 game. On January 5, 2013, they were the number 1 ranked Class 3A school in the state and they defeated the number 3 ranked and junior year Keita Bates-Diop-led University High School 81–51. Bates had a game-high 20 against Garrett's 19. When Morgan Park clashed with the senior season Parker/Nunn-led Simeon, there was controversy surrounding ineligibility determinations for 3 Simeon reserve players, including junior Donte Ingram. Despite 23 points by Garrett, Simeon handed Morgan Park its second loss by a 53–51 margin on January 16 at the Emil and Patricia Jones Convocation Center.

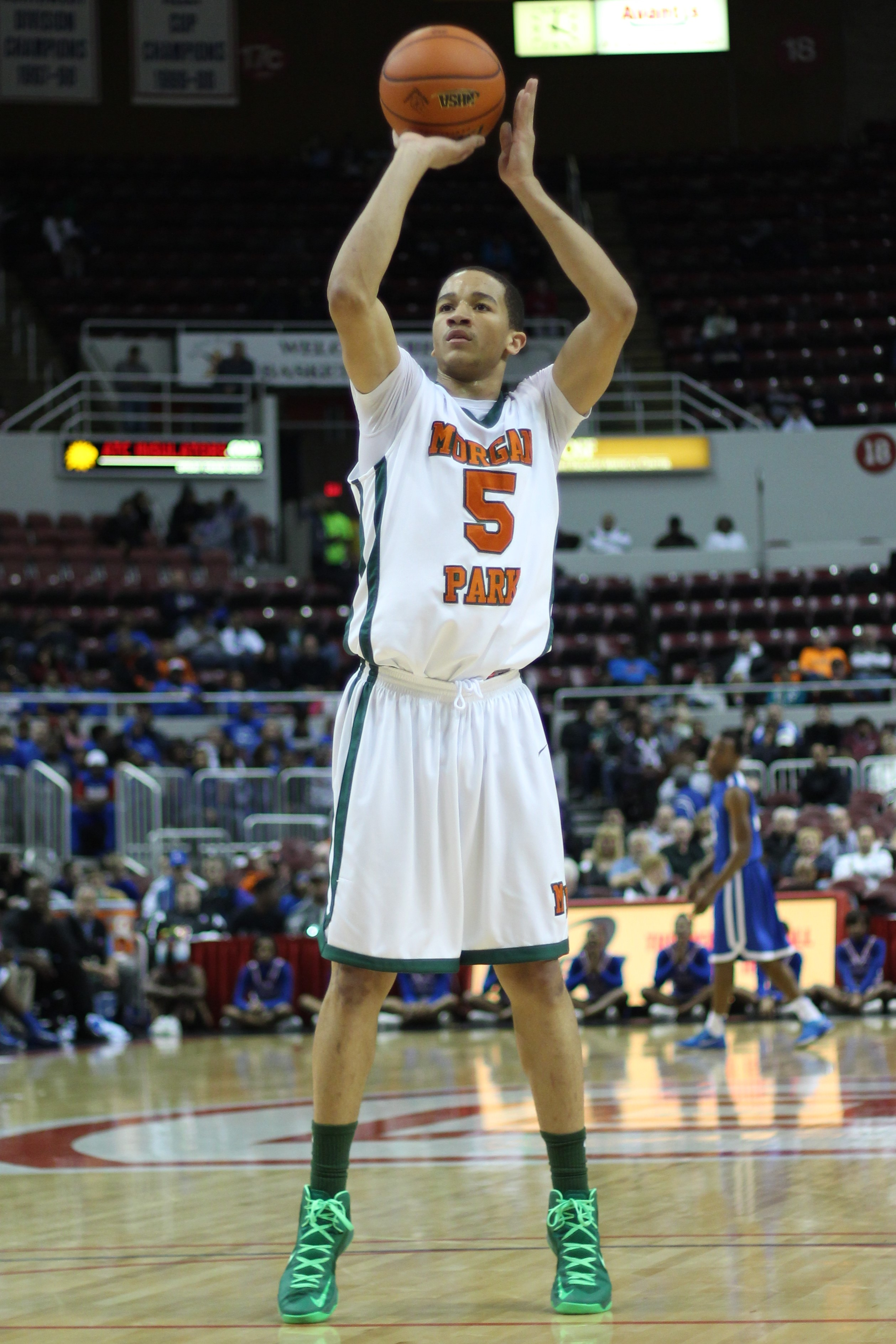
Garrett for Morgan Park High School in the 2013 IHSA 3A championship game.

In the 2013 Chicago Public League playoff quarterfinals against a junior season Cliff Alexander-led number 10-ranked Curie Metropolitan High School the number 2-ranked Morgan Park needed balanced scoring, including a team-high 15 points from Garrett, and a rally after trailing after each quarter to win 60–58. In the semifinals against Simeon, they never trailed in regulation, but still needed an overtime layup by Garrett with 10 seconds remaining for a 54–53 win. In the championship game against junior season Okafor-led Whitney M. Young Magnet High School, Garrett made 2 free throws with 1:47 remaining to give Morgan Park a three point lead, but their strategy to force someone other than Okafor (who wound up with 19 points and 14 rebounds) to beat them left them vulnerable to a game-tying three-point shot. Then, Garrett was rejected by one of Okafor's 7 blocks to end regulation before they lost 60–56 in overtime.

In the Class 3A Supersectional game hosted at Joliet Central High School, Morgan Park handily defeated Hillcrest 77–44 on March 12 as Garrett's stat line included just 8 points, 4 assists and 4 steals. This victory qualified them for the final four semifinal competition at Carver Arena in Peoria, Illinois. Garrett entered the semifinals with averages of 17.6 points, 8 assists, and 5 rebounds. The 33-point victory lowered the team's average margin of victory in the 2013 IHSA playoffs to 46.4 (with wins of 67, 33, 63, 36 and 33 points). Morgan Park defeated Limestone Community High School District 310 on March 15 by a 70–49 margin as Davis scored all 15 of his points (including 10–10 free throw shooting) before the fourth quarter. As a senior, he led the team to the 2013 IHSA 3A championship over Cahokia High School. The balanced scoring included 4 double-digit scorers as Garrett paced the team with 14 in the 63–48 victory on March 16. Morgan Park finished the season as the IHSA Class 3A champions with a 33–3 record.

Just before the final four weekend, the Associated Press named its All-state teams, with Garrett as it highest point recipient in Class 3A, where he was accompanied by junior Bates-Diop on the first team. Again most of the future NBA talent was in Class 4A (first team: Parker, Okafor, Hill, Alexander, and Brown; second team: Nunn, Tyler Ulis, and Brunson). Thus, despite him being atop the 3A talent, the Chicago Tribune only listed him as second team All-state at the end of March along with Hill, Alvin Ellis, teammate Davis and Alec Peters. Following the season Rivals.com listed him 22nd among point guards.

== College career ==
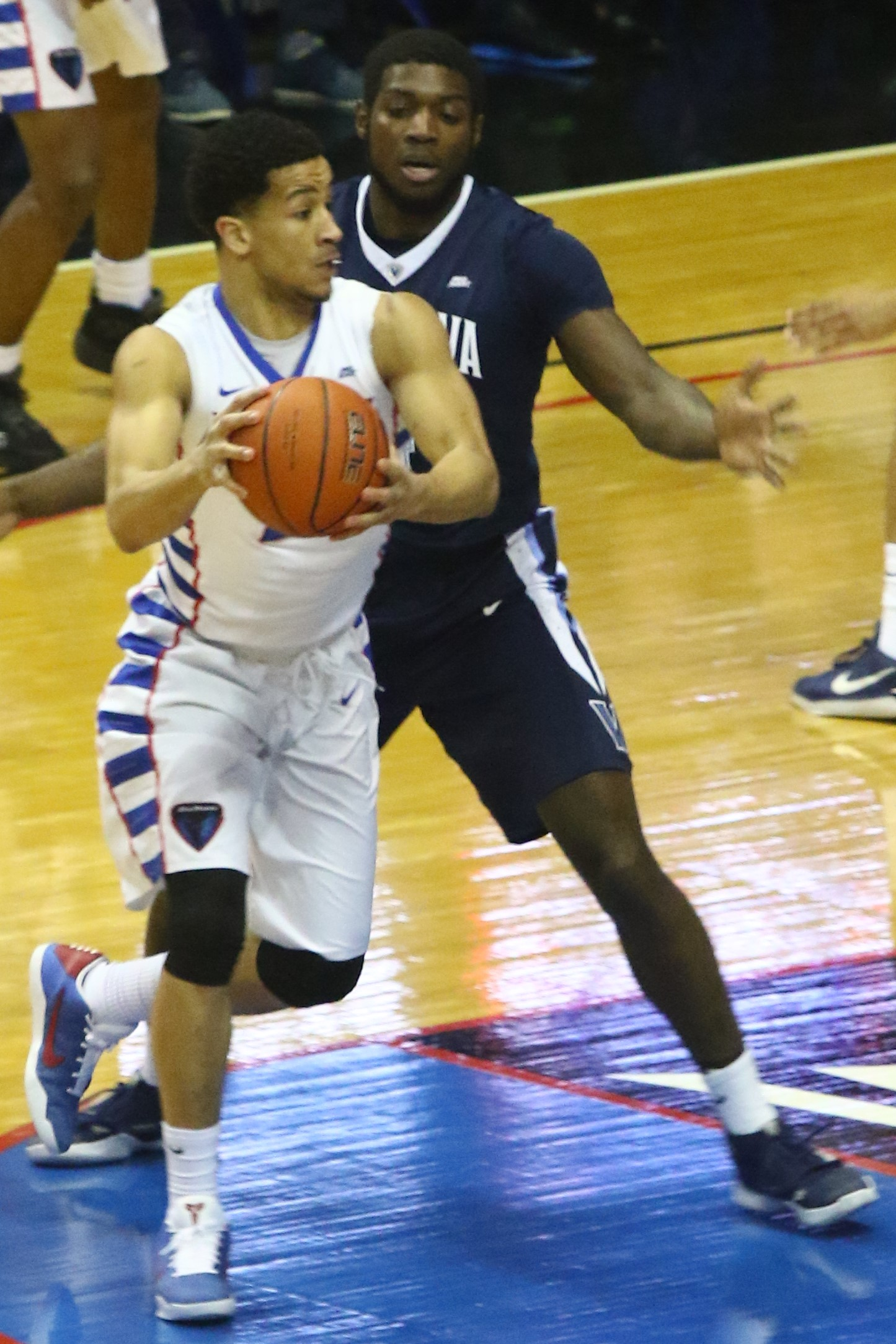
Garrett for the 2016–17 DePaul Blue Demons against Eric Paschall

In January 2014, he nearly died from a sickle cell crisis that caused intense leg pains during a flight and a "near-death experience" at the hospital in Newark, New Jersey afterwards. Garrett managed to rebound from his attack and win conference rookie of the year honors. He missed two games in January and February when his SC form (which is subject to factors such as fatigue, stress, cold, high altitude but is less severe than the SS form) flared up with shooting pain in both of his legs on a flight to New Jersey to play the January 25 game at Seton Hall. He also missed the February 1 game against Providence. He averaged 12.4 points and 3.2 assists per game as a freshman. As a junior, he averaged 12.6 points, 3.5 assists, and 2.9 rebounds per game on a 9–22 team.

During his career at DePaul, Garrett led the team in scoring once (2014–15, 12.3), free throw percentage all four season (82.5%, 83.2%, 81.9% and 88.2), and in assists each of his final three seasons (126, 107, 106). His career free throw percentage of 84.1% is third in school history and his single-season percentage of 88.2% (2016–17) is fourth as of November 2022. He went 11–11 or better from the free throw line on four separate occasions (St. John's January 18, 2015, 13; Georgetown January 9, 2016, 12, Colorado December 22, 2014, 11 and Milwaukee December 7, 2014, 11), whereas no one else in school history has done it more than once. Three of these happenings occurred in the same season.

He won several games for DePaul at the free throw line at the end of a close game. On January 20, 2016, against Marquette he made a layup followed by a free throw with 1.1 seconds left in a 57–56 win.

On January 10, 2017 he made another three point play with 4.7 seconds remaining for a 64–63 victory over Providence. On January 31, against Georgetown at home at the Allstate Arena, Garrett eclipsed Stephen Howard's career total of 528 made free throws. Against Georgetown on February 22 on the road at the Verizon Center now Capital One Arena, he converted both free throws with 0.2 seconds remaining for a 67–65 victory.

Regarding the lack of team success, "It has been disappointing for me," Garrett said. "I wanted to come in and help change the culture and bring a positive outlook on DePaul basketball citywide and nationwide." As a senior, he averaged 14.9 points per game while shooting 36 percent from three. Garrett finished his career as DePaul's all-time leader in made free throws (565).

Garret was a 2015 All-Big East honorable mention. On his way to 2014 Big East Rookie of the Year recognition, he earned Big East Freshman of the Week recognition five times (December 2, December 16, December 30, January 20, February 24). In addition, Garrett has earned numerous recognitions that combine his work on the court with classroom and community: 2017 National Association of Basketball Coaches (NABC) Good Works Team, 2017 National Association of Collegiate Directors of Athletics Scholar Athlete Team, NABC Honors Court (2016 & 2017), 2017 Big East Men's basketball Scholar-Athlete of the Year (for athletic and academic achievement), BIG EAST Scholar-Athlete Sport Excellence Award (for athletic, academic and community achievement), Big East Sportsmanship Award, Big East All-Academic Team (2014, 2015, & 2016). Following each season at DePaul, he was recognized as a Second Team Preseason All-BIG EAST selection for the following year in a polling of Big East coaches. Among Garrett's community activities was his service and advocacy as a guest speaker for sickle cell disease.

== Professional career ==
=== Westchester Knicks (2017–2019) ===
After going undrafted in the 2017 NBA draft, Garrett did not play in the NBA Summer League. He joined the Westchester Knicks of the NBA G-League. Garrett increased his role on the team after Trey Burke was called up to the New York Knicks. Garrett averaged 11.9 points, 2.7 boards, 2.5 assists and 1.0 steals in 27.1 minutes per game in his first season with the team. He appeared in all 50 games, making 14 starts. On October 4, 2018, he signed an Exhibit 10 deal with the New York Knicks to participate in the team's 2018 training camp. He returned to Westchester to play a second season for coach Mike Miller, averaging 16.5 points, 3.8 assists, and 3.2 rebounds per game in 48 games played (32 starts). He posted a 31.6% three-point field goal percentage and an 85.6% free throw percentage. In his two seasons with the Westchester Knicks, he became the franchise's all-time leader in points, field goals made, assists, minutes played and games played.

=== New York Knicks (2019) ===
On April 2, 2019, the New York Knicks announced that they had signed Garrett to a 10-day contract. The Knicks roster was beset with numerous injuries (Kadeem Allen (concussion), Isaiah Hicks (sore left hip), Dennis Smith Jr. (sore lower back), Allonzo Trier (strained left calf) and Noah Vonleh (sprained right ankle)), and Garrett's G League season had just come to an end. He debuted in the NBA on April 3 for the New York Knicks on the road against Orlando with 4 points in 11 minutes. Emmanuel Mudiay and Frank Ntilikina also were unavailable during his tenure leaving Garrett as the only true point guard on the roster at one point. In his brief NBA tenure to close out the 2018-19 NBA season, he was able to play at the United Center in his hometown when the Knicks played the Bulls on April 9. Several of his NBA career highs (8 points, 2 rebounds, 2 assists and 4 field goals) were tallied or tied at the United Center in his only NBA win. Garrett made all four of his free throw attempts, but missed all eight of his three-point shot attempts in the NBA. He became the first NBA player known to have the sickle-cell disease, which boosted his profile as an inspirational advocate for the affliction. In four games, he averaged 6.5 points per game. In July 2019, Garrett joined the Phoenix Suns for the 2019 NBA Summer League. In August, his returning player rights were traded to the Maine Red Claws for Andrew White's returning player rights.

=== Élan Chalon (2019) ===
On July 25, 2019, Garrett signed a deal with French club Élan Chalon.

=== Larisa (2020) ===
On January 2, 2020, Garrett officially signed with Greek club Larisa for the remainder of the season.

Garrett joined House of 'Paign, a team composed primarily of Illinois alumni in The Basketball Tournament 2020. He scored nine points in a 76–53 win over War Tampa in the first round.

=== Lakeland Magic (2021) ===
For the 2020–21 season, Garrett joined the Lakeland Magic of the G League where he averaged 11.7 points, 2.9 rebounds and 5.3 assists in 29.4 minutes en route to the NBA G League title. 2020–21 NBA G League season's championship was earned in a setting similar to the 2020 NBA Bubble so no fans were in attendance to see the team earn the franchise's first championship.

=== Czarni Słupsk (2021–2022) ===
On July 22, 2021, Garrett signed with Czarni Słupsk of the Energa Basket Liga.

=== Riesen Ludwigsburg (2022) ===
On August 23, 2022, he has signed with Riesen Ludwigsburg of the Basketball Bundesliga.

=== Arka Gdynia (2022) ===
On November 10, 2022, he signed with Arka Gdynia of the Polish Basketball League.

=== Legia Warszawa (2022–2023) ===
On December 2, 2022, he signed with Legia Warszawa of the Polish Basketball League.

== Career statistics ==
Legend
GP	Games played	GS	Games started	MPG	Minutes per game
FG%	Field goal percentage	3P%	3-point field goal percentage	FT%	Free throw percentage
RPG	Rebounds per game	APG	Assists per game	SPG	Steals per game
BPG	Blocks per game	PPG	Points per game	**Bold**	Career high

=== NBA ===
==== Regular season ====
Year	Team	GP	GS	MPG	FG%	3P%	FT%	RPG	APG	SPG	BPG	PPG
2018–19	New York	4	0	15.8	.407	.000	1.000	.8	1.8	.3	.3	6.5
Career		4	0	15.8	.407	.000	1.000	.8	1.8	.3	.3	6.5
