= 2018–19 New York Knicks season =

Season of National Basketball Association team the New York Knicks

- Head coach: David Fizdale
- President: Steve Mills
- General manager: Scott Perry
- Owners: The Madison Square Garden Company
- Arena: Madison Square Garden

Results
- Record: 17–65 (.207)
- Place: Division: 5th (Atlantic); Conference: 15th (Eastern)
- Playoff finish: Did not qualify
- Stats at Basketball Reference

Local media
- Television: MSG TV
- Radio: WEPN-FM

The 2018–19 New York Knicks season was the 73rd season of the franchise in the National Basketball Association (NBA). On April 12, 2018, the Knicks fired head coach Jeff Hornacek after the team missed the playoffs. On May 7, 2018, the Knicks hired David Fizdale as head coach. The Knicks were eliminated from playoff contention on March 4, 2019, when they lost to the Sacramento Kings 115–108. The team ended the season with the worst record in the NBA, and tied the franchise-worst record set in the 2014–15 season.

== Draft ==
2018 NBA draft picks
| Round | Pick | Player | Position | Nationality | School/club |
|---|---|---|---|---|---|
| 1 | 9 | Kevin Knox II | SF | United States | Kentucky |
| 2 | 36 | Mitchell Robinson | C | United States | Chalmette High School |

== Roster ==
2018–19 New York Knicks roster
Players

| Pos. | No. | Player | Height | Weight | DOB | From |
|---|---|---|---|---|---|---|
| G | 0 | Kadeem Allen (TW) | 6 ft 3 in (1.91 m) | 200 lb (91 kg) | 1993-01-15 | Arizona |
| G | 21 | Damyean Dotson | 6 ft 6 in (1.98 m) | 210 lb (95 kg) | 1994-05-06 | Houston |
| F | 13 | Henry Ellenson | 6 ft 11 in (2.11 m) | 245 lb (111 kg) | 1997-01-13 | Marquette |
| G/F | 3 | Billy Garrett | 6 ft 6 in (1.98 m) | 215 lb (98 kg) | 1994-10-16 | DePaul |
| F | 8 | Mario Hezonja | 6 ft 8 in (2.03 m) | 225 lb (102 kg) | 1995-02-25 | Croatia |
| F | 4 | Isaiah Hicks (TW) | 6 ft 9 in (2.06 m) | 230 lb (104 kg) | 1994-07-24 | North Carolina |
| G | 30 | John Jenkins | 6 ft 4 in (1.93 m) | 215 lb (98 kg) | 1991-03-06 | Vanderbilt |
| C | 6 | DeAndre Jordan | 6 ft 11 in (2.11 m) | 265 lb (120 kg) | 1988-07-21 | Texas A&M |
| F | 20 | Kevin Knox II | 6 ft 9 in (2.06 m) | 215 lb (98 kg) | 1999-08-11 | Kentucky |
| F/C | 2 | Luke Kornet | 7 ft 1 in (2.16 m) | 250 lb (113 kg) | 1995-07-15 | Vanderbilt |
| G | 1 | Emmanuel Mudiay | 6 ft 5 in (1.96 m) | 200 lb (91 kg) | 1996-03-05 | Prime Prep Academy (TX) |
| G | 11 | Frank Ntilikina | 6 ft 6 in (1.98 m) | 200 lb (91 kg) | 1998-07-28 | France |
| C | 26 | Mitchell Robinson | 7 ft 1 in (2.16 m) | 240 lb (109 kg) | 1998-04-01 | Chalmette HS (LA) |
| G | 5 | Dennis Jr. Smith | 6 ft 3 in (1.91 m) | 195 lb (88 kg) | 1997-11-25 | NC State |
| F | 42 | Lance Thomas | 6 ft 8 in (2.03 m) | 240 lb (109 kg) | 1988-04-24 | Duke |
| G | 14 | Allonzo Trier | 6 ft 5 in (1.96 m) | 200 lb (91 kg) | 1996-01-17 | Arizona |
| F | 32 | Noah Vonleh | 6 ft 9 in (2.06 m) | 250 lb (113 kg) | 1995-08-24 | Indiana |

Coaches
Head coach
- David Fizdale
Assistant(s)
- Jud Buechler
- Kaleb Canales
- Howard Eisley
- Royal Ivey
- Keith Smart
- Pat Sullivan

Legend
- (DP) Unsigned draft pick
- (FA) Free agent
- (S) Suspended
- (GL) On assignment to G League affiliate
- (TW) Two-way affiliate player
- Injured

Roster
Updated: April 10, 2019

== Standings ==
=== Division ===
| Atlantic Division | W | L | PCT | GB | Home | Road | Div | GP |
|---|---|---|---|---|---|---|---|---|
| y – Toronto Raptors | 58 | 24 | .707 | – | 32‍–‍9 | 26‍–‍15 | 12–4 | 82 |
| x – Philadelphia 76ers | 51 | 31 | .622 | 7.0 | 31‍–‍10 | 20‍–‍21 | 8–8 | 82 |
| x – Boston Celtics | 49 | 33 | .598 | 9.0 | 28‍–‍13 | 21‍–‍20 | 10–6 | 82 |
| x – Brooklyn Nets | 42 | 40 | .512 | 16.0 | 23‍–‍18 | 19‍–‍22 | 8–8 | 82 |
| New York Knicks | 17 | 65 | .207 | 41.0 | 9‍–‍32 | 8‍–‍33 | 2–14 | 82 |

=== Conference ===
Eastern Conference
| # | Team | W | L | PCT | GB | GP |
|---|---|---|---|---|---|---|
| 1 | z – Milwaukee Bucks * | 60 | 22 | .732 | – | 82 |
| 2 | y – Toronto Raptors * | 58 | 24 | .707 | 2.0 | 82 |
| 3 | x – Philadelphia 76ers | 51 | 31 | .622 | 9.0 | 82 |
| 4 | x – Boston Celtics | 49 | 33 | .598 | 11.0 | 82 |
| 5 | x – Indiana Pacers | 48 | 34 | .585 | 12.0 | 82 |
| 6 | x – Brooklyn Nets | 42 | 40 | .512 | 18.0 | 82 |
| 7 | y – Orlando Magic * | 42 | 40 | .512 | 18.0 | 82 |
| 8 | x – Detroit Pistons | 41 | 41 | .500 | 19.0 | 82 |
| 9 | Charlotte Hornets | 39 | 43 | .476 | 21.0 | 82 |
| 10 | Miami Heat | 39 | 43 | .476 | 21.0 | 82 |
| 11 | Washington Wizards | 32 | 50 | .390 | 28.0 | 82 |
| 12 | Atlanta Hawks | 29 | 53 | .354 | 31.0 | 82 |
| 13 | Chicago Bulls | 22 | 60 | .268 | 38.0 | 82 |
| 14 | Cleveland Cavaliers | 19 | 63 | .232 | 41.0 | 82 |
| 15 | New York Knicks | 17 | 65 | .207 | 43.0 | 82 |

== Game log ==
=== Preseason ===
The preseason schedule was announced on July 9, 2018.

2018 preseason game log
Total: 3–2 (home: 1–2; road: 2–0)
Preseason: 3–2 (home: 1–2; road: 2–0)

| Game | Date | Team | Score | High points | High rebounds | High assists | Location Attendance | Record |
|---|---|---|---|---|---|---|---|---|
| 1 | October 1 | @ Washington | W 124–121 (OT) | Dotson (14) | Knox (10) | Mudiay (5) | Capital One Arena; 11,826 | 1–0 |
| 2 | October 3 | @ Brooklyn | W 107–102 | Trier (25) | Kanter (20) | Burke (3) | Barclays Center; 12,424 | 2–0 |
| 3 | October 5 | New Orleans | W 106–100 | Hardaway Jr. (21) | Kanter (15) | Mudiay (6) | Madison Square Garden; 17,162 | 3–0 |
| 4 | October 8 | Washington | L 98–110 | Hardaway Jr., Trier (18) | Vonleh (7) | Mudiay, Trier (4) | Madison Square Garden; 17,695 | 3–1 |
| 5 | October 12 | Brooklyn | L 107–113 | Hardaway Jr. (18) | Vonleh (5) | Ntilikina (5) | Madison Square Garden; 19,812 | 3–2 |

2018–19 preseason schedule

=== Regular season ===
The regular season schedule was released on August 10, 2018.

2018–19 game log
Total: 17–65 (home: 9–32; road: 8–33)
October: 2–6 (home: 2–3; road: 0–3)

| Game | Date | Team | Score | High points | High rebounds | High assists | Location Attendance | Record |
|---|---|---|---|---|---|---|---|---|
| 1 | October 17 | Atlanta | W 126–107 | Hardaway Jr. (31) | Kanter (11) | Hardaway Jr. (5) | Madison Square Garden; 18,249 | 1–0 |
| 2 | October 19 | @ Brooklyn | L 105–107 | Hardaway Jr., Kanter (29) | Kanter (10) | Burke, Ntilikina (4) | Barclays Center; 17,732 | 1–1 |
| 3 | October 20 | Boston | L 101–103 | Hardaway Jr. (24) | Kanter (15) | Burke (9) | Madison Square Garden; 19,427 | 1–2 |
| 4 | October 22 | @ Milwaukee | L 113–124 | Hardaway Jr. (24) | Kanter (13) | Ntilikina (5) | Fiserv Forum; 16,228 | 1–3 |
| 5 | October 24 | @ Miami | L 87–110 | Dotson (20) | Dotson (10) | Ntilikina (5) | American Airlines Arena; 19,600 | 1–4 |
| 6 | October 26 | Golden State | L 100–128 | Hardaway Jr. (24) | Kanter (13) | Hardaway Jr., Vonleh (4) | Madison Square Garden; 19,812 | 1–5 |
| 7 | October 29 | Brooklyn | W 115–96 | Hardaway Jr. (25) | Kanter (15) | Hardaway Jr. (8) | Madison Square Garden; 19,221 | 2–5 |
| 8 | October 31 | Indiana | L 101–107 | Hardaway Jr. (37) | Vonleh (10) | Ntilikina (7) | Madison Square Garden; 18,295 | 2–6 |

November: 5–10 (home: 1–3; road: 4–7)

| Game | Date | Team | Score | High points | High rebounds | High assists | Location Attendance | Record |
|---|---|---|---|---|---|---|---|---|
| 9 | November 2 | @ Dallas | W 118–106 | Trier (23) | Robinson (10) | Ntilikina (7) | American Airlines Center; 20,008 | 3–6 |
| 10 | November 4 | @ Washington | L 95–108 | Kanter (18) | Kanter (12) | Hardaway Jr. (4) | Capital One Arena; 16,679 | 3–7 |
| 11 | November 5 | Chicago | L 115–116 (2OT) | Kanter (23) | Kanter (24) | Kanter (7) | Madison Square Garden; 19,812 | 3–8 |
| 12 | November 7 | @ Atlanta | W 112–107 | Hardaway Jr. (34) | Vonleh (13) | Hardaway Jr., Mudiay, Ntilikina (3) | State Farm Arena; 12,412 | 4–8 |
| 13 | November 10 | @ Toronto | L 112–128 | Hardaway Jr. (27) | Kanter (15) | Ntilikina (4) | Scotiabank Arena; 19,800 | 4–9 |
| 14 | November 11 | Orlando | L 89–115 | Knox (17) | Kanter (15) | Burke (5) | Madison Square Garden; 19,812 | 4–10 |
| 15 | November 14 | @ Oklahoma City | L 103–128 | Hardaway Jr. (20) | Hezonja (6) | Mudiay (5) | Chesapeake Energy Arena; 18,203 | 4–11 |
| 16 | November 16 | @ New Orleans | L 124–129 | Hardaway Jr. (30) | Hardaway Jr. (8) | Trier (5) | Smoothie King Center; 14,717 | 4–12 |
| 17 | November 18 | @ Orlando | L 117–131 | Hardaway Jr. (32) | Kanter (19) | Kanter (3) | Amway Center; 15,898 | 4–13 |
| 18 | November 20 | Portland | L 114–118 | Hardaway Jr. (32) | Vonleh (14) | Kanter (6) | Madison Square Garden; 19,812 | 4–14 |
| 19 | November 21 | @ Boston | W 117–109 | Burke (29) | Kanter, Vonleh (10) | Burke (11) | TD Garden; 18,624 | 5–14 |
| 20 | November 23 | New Orleans | W 114–109 | Mudiay (27) | Kanter, Vonleh (11) | Vonleh (5) | Madison Square Garden; 18,948 | 6–14 |
| 21 | November 25 | @ Memphis | W 103–98 | Hardaway Jr. (22) | Kanter (26) | Mudiay (4) | FedExForum; 14,331 | 7–14 |
| 22 | November 27 | @ Detroit | L 108–115 | Trier (24) | Kanter (14) | Trier (7) | Little Caesars Arena; 13,935 | 7–15 |
| 23 | November 28 | @ Philadelphia | L 91–117 | Hezonja, Kanter (17) | Knox, Vonleh (7) | Hardaway Jr. (3) | Wells Fargo Center; 20,274 | 7–16 |

December: 2–12 (home: 1–6; road: 1–6)

| Game | Date | Team | Score | High points | High rebounds | High assists | Location Attendance | Record |
|---|---|---|---|---|---|---|---|---|
| 24 | December 1 | Milwaukee | W 136–134 (OT) | Mudiay (28) | Kanter (7) | Hardaway Jr. (8) | Madison Square Garden; 19,812 | 8–16 |
| 25 | December 3 | Washington | L 107–110 | Hardaway Jr. (20) | Kanter (16) | Knox, Mudiay (4) | Madison Square Garden; 19,440 | 8–17 |
| 26 | December 6 | @ Boston | L 100–128 | Hardaway Jr. (22) | Kanter (11) | Mudiay (6) | TD Garden; 18,624 | 8–18 |
| 27 | December 8 | Brooklyn | L 104–112 | Kanter (23) | Kanter (14) | Mudiay, Vonleh (4) | Madison Square Garden; 18,662 | 8–19 |
| 28 | December 9 | Charlotte | L 107–119 | Knox (26) | Knox (15) | Vonleh (9) | Madison Square Garden; 18,602 | 8–20 |
| 29 | December 12 | @ Cleveland | L 106–113 | Hardaway Jr., Kanter (20) | Kanter (10) | Mudiay (7) | Quicken Loans Arena; 19,432 | 8–21 |
| 30 | December 14 | @ Charlotte | W 126–124 (OT) | Mudiay (34) | Vonleh (11) | Mudiay (8) | Spectrum Center; 17,622 | 9–21 |
| 31 | December 16 | @ Indiana | L 99–110 | Kanter (20) | Kanter (15) | Mudiay (6) | Bankers Life Fieldhouse; 16,646 | 9–22 |
| 32 | December 17 | Phoenix | L 110–128 | Mudiay (32) | Kanter (10) | Mudiay (6) | Madison Square Garden; 18,437 | 9–23 |
| 33 | December 19 | @ Philadelphia | L 109–131 | Hardaway Jr. (27) | Vonleh (10) | Hardaway Jr., Mudiay, Vonleh (5) | Wells Fargo Center; 20,424 | 9–24 |
| 34 | December 21 | Atlanta | L 107–114 | Mudiay (32) | Vonleh (10) | Hardaway Jr. (5) | Madison Square Garden; 19,080 | 9–25 |
| 35 | December 25 | Milwaukee | L 95–109 | Knox (21) | Vonleh (14) | Mudiay (5) | Madison Square Garden; 19,812 | 9–26 |
| 36 | December 27 | @ Milwaukee | L 96–112 | Kornet (23) | Vonleh (13) | Mudiay (6) | Fiserv Forum; 18,058 | 9–27 |
| 37 | December 29 | @ Utah | L 97–129 | Hardaway Jr. (18) | Vonleh (9) | Kornet, Mudiay (5) | Vivint Smart Home Arena; 18,306 | 9–28 |

January: 1–12 (home: 0–6; road: 1–6)

| Game | Date | Team | Score | High points | High rebounds | High assists | Location Attendance | Record |
|---|---|---|---|---|---|---|---|---|
| 38 | January 1 | @ Denver | L 108–115 | Kornet (19) | Vonleh (14) | Mudiay (9) | Pepsi Center; 19,520 | 9–29 |
| 39 | January 4 | @ L.A. Lakers | W 119–112 | Hardaway Jr. (22) | Kanter (15) | Mudiay (6) | Staples Center; 18,997 | 10–29 |
| 40 | January 7 | @ Portland | L 101–111 | Kanter (18) | Kanter, Vonleh (14) | Mudiay (7) | Moda Center; 19,026 | 10–30 |
| 41 | January 8 | @ Golden State | L 95–122 | Hezonja (19) | Kanter (16) | Mudiay (4) | Oracle Arena; 19,596 | 10–31 |
| 42 | January 11 | Indiana | L 106–121 | Mudiay (21) | Thomas (7) | Dotson (4) | Madison Square Garden; 19,812 | 10–32 |
| 43 | January 13 | Philadelphia | L 105–108 | Knox (31) | Knox (7) | Ntilikina (6) | Madison Square Garden; 18,596 | 10–33 |
| 44 | January 17 | @ Washington | L 100–101 | Mudiay (25) | Vonleh (10) | Trier (3) | The O2 Arena; 19,078 | 10–34 |
| 45 | January 21 | Oklahoma City | L 109–127 | Hardaway Jr. (23) | Robinson, Trier (6) | Trier (8) | Madison Square Garden; 19,493 | 10–35 |
| 46 | January 23 | Houston | L 110–114 | Trier (31) | Vonleh, Trier (10) | Ntilikina (6) | Madison Square Garden; 18,819 | 10–36 |
| 47 | January 25 | @ Brooklyn | L 99–109 | Burke (25) | Vonleh (13) | Burke, Ntilikina (5) | Barclays Center; 17,033 | 10–37 |
| 48 | January 27 | Miami | L 97–106 | Hardaway Jr. (22) | Vonleh (9) | Hardaway Jr. (5) | Madison Square Garden; 18,852 | 10–38 |
| 49 | January 28 | @ Charlotte | L 92–101 | Knox (19) | Vonleh (12) | Hardaway Jr. (4) | Spectrum Center; 13,963 | 10–39 |
| 50 | January 30 | Dallas | L 90–114 | Knox (17) | Robinson (7) | Allen, Burke, Hardaway Jr. (3) | Madison Square Garden; 18,842 | 10–40 |

February: 3–9 (home: 2–7; road: 1–2)

| Game | Date | Team | Score | High points | High rebounds | High assists | Location Attendance | Record |
|---|---|---|---|---|---|---|---|---|
| 51 | February 1 | Boston | L 99–113 | Dotson (22) | Vonleh (11) | Vonleh (7) | Madison Square Garden; 18,343 | 10–41 |
| 52 | February 3 | Memphis | L 84–96 | Knox II (17) | Jordan (12) | Smith Jr. (6) | Madison Square Garden; 17,025 | 10–42 |
| 53 | February 5 | Detroit | L 92–105 | Smith Jr. (25) | Robinson (10) | Smith Jr. (6) | Madison Square Garden; 17,853 | 10–43 |
| 54 | February 8 | @ Detroit | L 103–120 | Smith Jr. (31) | Jordan (11) | Smith Jr. (8) | Little Caesars Arena; 14,430 | 10–44 |
| 55 | February 9 | Toronto | L 99–104 | Knox (20) | Jordan (18) | Allen, Smith Jr. (6) | Madison Square Garden; 18,886 | 10–45 |
| 56 | February 11 | @ Cleveland | L 104–107 | Allen (25) | Jordan (10) | Allen (6) | Quicken Loans Arena; 19,432 | 10–46 |
| 57 | February 13 | Philadelphia | L 111–126 | Trier (19) | Robinson (13) | Jordan (7) | Madison Square Garden; 18,983 | 10–47 |
| 58 | February 14 | @ Atlanta | W 106–91 | Smith Jr. (19) | Jordan (13) | Allen (9) | State Farm Arena; 14,179 | 11–47 |
| 59 | February 22 | Minnesota | L 104–115 | Dotson, Trier (20) | Jordan (19) | Smith Jr. (7) | Madison Square Garden; 19,096 | 11–48 |
| 60 | February 24 | San Antonio | W 130–118 | Dotson (27) | Robinson (14) | Smith Jr. (13) | Madison Square Garden; 18,019 | 12–48 |
| 61 | February 26 | Orlando | W 108–103 | Mudiay (19) | Robinson (14) | Ellenson (5) | Madison Square Garden; 17,833 | 13–48 |
| 62 | February 28 | Cleveland | L 118–125 | Trier (22) | Vonleh (10) | Smith Jr. (8) | Madison Square Garden; 17,573 | 13–49 |

March: 1–13 (home: 1–6; road: 0–7)

| Game | Date | Team | Score | High points | High rebounds | High assists | Location Attendance | Record |
|---|---|---|---|---|---|---|---|---|
| 63 | March 3 | @ L.A. Clippers | L 107–128 | Dotson, Vonleh (17) | Robinson (13) | Smith Jr. (6) | Staples Center; 19,068 | 13–50 |
| 64 | March 4 | @ Sacramento | L 108–115 | Trier (29) | Vonleh (13) | Mudiay, Smith Jr. (5) | Golden 1 Center; 17,034 | 13–51 |
| 65 | March 6 | @ Phoenix | L 96–107 | Jordan (17) | Jordan (14) | Smith Jr. (6) | Talking Stick Resort Arena; 14,427 | 13–52 |
| 66 | March 9 | Sacramento | L 94–102 | Smith Jr. (18) | Jordan (15) | Smith Jr. (5) | Madison Square Garden; 19,812 | 13–53 |
| 67 | March 10 | @ Minnesota | L 92–103 | Dotson (26) | Robinson (10) | Dotson (6) | Target Center; 13,806 | 13–54 |
| 68 | March 12 | @ Indiana | L 98–103 | Mudiay (21) | Jordan (16) | Jordan (5) | Bankers Life Fieldhouse; 16,679 | 13–55 |
| 69 | March 15 | @ San Antonio | L 83–109 | Dotson (21) | Jordan (13) | Jordan (9) | AT&T Center; 18,354 | 13–56 |
| 70 | March 17 | L.A. Lakers | W 124–123 | Mudiay (28) | Jordan (17) | Mudiay (8) | Madison Square Garden; 19,812 | 14–56 |
| 71 | March 18 | @ Toronto | L 92–128 | Trier (22) | Jordan, Knox (6) | Hezonja, Jordan, Mudiay, Trier (3) | Scotiabank Arena; 19,800 | 14–57 |
| 72 | March 20 | Utah | L 116–137 | Knox (27) | Robinson (12) | Ellenson, Jordan, Mudiay (5) | Madison Square Garden; 18,530 | 14–58 |
| 73 | March 22 | Denver | L 93–111 | Mudiay (21) | Jordan (11) | Ntilikina (5) | Madison Square Garden; 19,290 | 14–59 |
| 74 | March 24 | L.A. Clippers | L 113–124 | Mudiay (26) | Jordan (13) | Mudiay (7) | Madison Square Garden; 18,263 | 14–60 |
| 75 | March 28 | Toronto | L 92–117 | Robinson (19) | Robinson (21) | Jordan (4) | Madison Square Garden; 19,812 | 14–61 |
| 76 | March 30 | Miami | L 92–100 | Mudiay (24) | Robinson (14) | Allen (6) | Madison Square Garden; 19,812 | 14–62 |

April: 3–3 (home: 2–1; road: 1–2)

| Game | Date | Team | Score | High points | High rebounds | High assists | Location Attendance | Record |
|---|---|---|---|---|---|---|---|---|
| 77 | April 1 | Chicago | W 113–105 | Kornet (24) | Robinson (10) | Dotson (6) | Madison Square Garden; 18,874 | 15–62 |
| 78 | April 3 | @ Orlando | L 100–114 | Hezonja (29) | Hezonja, Robinson (9) | Mudiay (10) | Amway Center; 18,846 | 15–63 |
| 79 | April 5 | @ Houston | L 96–120 | Ellenson, Hezonja (16) | Hezonja (16) | Hezonja (11) | Toyota Center; 18,055 | 15–64 |
| 80 | April 7 | Washington | W 113–110 | Hezonja (30) | Robinson (11) | Dotson, Hezonja, Knox, Smith Jr. (5) | Madison Square Garden; 19,812 | 16–64 |
| 81 | April 9 | @ Chicago | W 96–86 | Smith Jr. (25) | Robinson (17) | Smith Jr. (5) | United Center; 21,350 | 17–64 |
| 82 | April 10 | Detroit | L 89–115 | Jenkins (16) | Knox (7) | Allen (8) | Madison Square Garden; 19,812 | 17–65 |

2018–19 season schedule

== Player statistics ==
Legend
| GP | Games played | GS | Games started | MPG | Minutes per game |
| FG% | Field-goal percentage | 3P% | 3-point field-goal percentage | FT% | Free-throw percentage |
| RPG | Rebounds per game | APG | Assists per game | SPG | Steals per game |
| BPG | Blocks per game | PPG | Points per game |

=== Regular season statistics ===
As of April 10, 2019

New York Knicks statistics
| Player | GP | GS | MPG | FG% | 3P% | FT% | RPG | APG | SPG | BPG | PPG |
|---|---|---|---|---|---|---|---|---|---|---|---|
| Kadeem Allen | 19 | 1 | 21.9 | .461 | .472 | .778 | 2.7 | 4.0 | .8 | .2 | 9.9 |
| Ron Baker | 11 | 0 | 9.7 | .250 | .111 | .833 | .6 | 1.2 | .5 | .0 | 1.3 |
| Trey Burke | 33 | 7 | 20.9 | .413 | .349 | .827 | 1.9 | 2.8 | .6 | .2 | 11.8 |
| Damyean Dotson | 73 | 40 | 27.5 | .415 | .368 | .745 | 3.6 | 1.8 | .8 | .1 | 10.7 |
| Henry Ellenson | 17 | 0 | 13.8 | .412 | .441 | .739 | 3.4 | .9 | .4 | .1 | 6.0 |
| Billy Garrett Jr. | 4 | 0 | 15.8 | .407 | .000 | 1.000 | .8 | 1.8 | .3 | .3 | 6.5 |
| Tim Hardaway Jr. | 46 | 46 | 32.6 | .388 | .347 | .854 | 3.5 | 2.7 | .9 | .1 | 19.1 |
| Mario Hezonja | 58 | 24 | 20.8 | .412 | .276 | .763 | 4.1 | 1.5 | 1.0 | .1 | 8.8 |
| Isaiah Hicks | 3 | 0 | 10.7 | .500 | — | .800 | 2.3 | .7 | .3 | 1.0 | 4.0 |
| John Jenkins | 22 | 0 | 14.5 | .388 | .357 | .833 | 1.6 | 1.0 | .0 | .1 | 5.2 |
| DeAndre Jordan | 19 | 19 | 25.9 | .634 | — | .773 | 11.4 | 3.0 | .5 | 1.1 | 10.9 |
| Enes Kanter | 44 | 23 | 25.6 | .536 | .318 | .814 | 10.5 | 1.9 | .4 | .4 | 14.0 |
| Kevin Knox II | 75 | 57 | 28.8 | .370 | .343 | .717 | 4.5 | 1.1 | .6 | .3 | 12.8 |
| Luke Kornet | 46 | 18 | 17.0 | .378 | .363 | .826 | 2.9 | 1.2 | .6 | .9 | 7.0 |
| Courtney Lee | 12 | 2 | 13.3 | .447 | .313 | .643 | 2.3 | 1.3 | .7 | .2 | 4.7 |
| Wesley Matthews | 2 | 1 | 27.0 | .211 | .200 | .800 | 1.5 | 2.5 | .5 | .5 | 7.0 |
| Emmanuel Mudiay | 59 | 42 | 27.2 | .446 | .329 | .774 | 3.3 | 3.9 | .7 | .3 | 14.8 |
| Frank Ntilikina | 43 | 16 | 21.0 | .337 | .287 | .767 | 2.0 | 2.8 | .7 | .3 | 5.7 |
| Mitchell Robinson | 66 | 19 | 20.6 | .694 | — | .600 | 6.4 | .6 | .8 | 2.4 | 7.3 |
| Dennis Smith Jr. | 21 | 18 | 28.6 | .413 | .289 | .568 | 2.8 | 5.4 | 1.3 | .4 | 14.7 |
| Lance Thomas | 46 | 17 | 17.0 | .396 | .278 | .750 | 2.5 | .6 | .4 | .2 | 4.5 |
| Allonzo Trier | 64 | 3 | 22.8 | .448 | .394 | .803 | 3.1 | 1.9 | .4 | .2 | 10.9 |
| Noah Vonleh | 68 | 57 | 25.3 | .470 | .336 | .712 | 7.8 | 1.9 | .7 | .8 | 8.4 |

== Transactions ==
=== Trades ===
| January 31, 2019 | To New York Knicks DeAndre Jordan; Wesley Matthews; Dennis Smith Jr. 2021 unprotected first-round pick 2023 protected top 10 pick | To Dallas Mavericks Trey Burke; Tim Hardaway Jr. Courtney Lee; Kristaps Porziņģis |

=== Additions ===
| Date | Player | Former team | Ref |
|---|---|---|---|
| July 3, 2018 | Allonzo Trier | Arizona Wildcats | |
| July 6, 2018 | Mario Hezonja | Orlando Magic | |
| July 24, 2018 | Noah Vonleh | Chicago Bulls | |
| July 25, 2018 | Kadeem Allen | Boston Celtics | |
| September 25, 2018 | Tyrius Walker | Morehouse College Maroon Tigers | |
| October 2, 2018 | Phillip Carr | Morgan State Bears | |
| October 3, 2018 | John Jenkins | San Pablo Burgos | |
| October 4, 2018 | Billy Garrett Jr. | Westchester Knicks | |
| October 5, 2018 | Paul Watson | Westchester Knicks | |
| October 7, 2018 | Jeff Coby | Xuventude Baloncesto | |
| January 14, 2019 | Kadeem Allen | Westchester Knicks | |
| February 11, 2019 | John Jenkins | Westchester Knicks | |
| February 20, 2019 | Henry Ellenson | Detroit Pistons | |
| February 21, 2019 | John Jenkins | — | |
| March 2, 2019 | Henry Ellenson | — | |
| April 2, 2019 | Billy Garrett Jr. | Westchester Knicks | |

=== Subtractions ===
| Date | Player | New team | Ref |
|---|---|---|---|
| July 9, 2018 | Kyle O'Quinn | Indiana Pacers | |
| July 16, 2018 | Troy Williams | New Orleans Pelicans | |
| July 23, 2018 | Michael Beasley | Los Angeles Lakers | |
| July 13, 2018 | Johnny O'Bryant III | Maccabi Tel Aviv | |
| September 19, 2018 | Jarrett Jack | New Orleans Pelicans | |
| October 2, 2018 | Tyrius Walker | Westchester Knicks | |
| October 3, 2018 | Phillip Carr | Westchester Knicks | |
| October 4, 2018 | John Jenkins | Westchester Knicks | |
| October 5, 2018 | Billy Garrett Jr. | Westchester Knicks | |
| October 6, 2018 | Paul Watson | Westchester Knicks | |
| October 13, 2018 | Kadeem Allen | Westchester Knicks | |
| October 13, 2018 | Jeff Coby | Westchester Knicks | |
| October 13, 2018 | Joakim Noah | Memphis Grizzlies | |
| December 13, 2018 | Ron Baker | Washington Wizards | |
| February 7, 2019 | Enes Kanter | Portland Trail Blazers | |
| February 7, 2019 | Wesley Matthews | Indiana Pacers | |
