= Damyean Dotson =

American basketball player (born 1994)

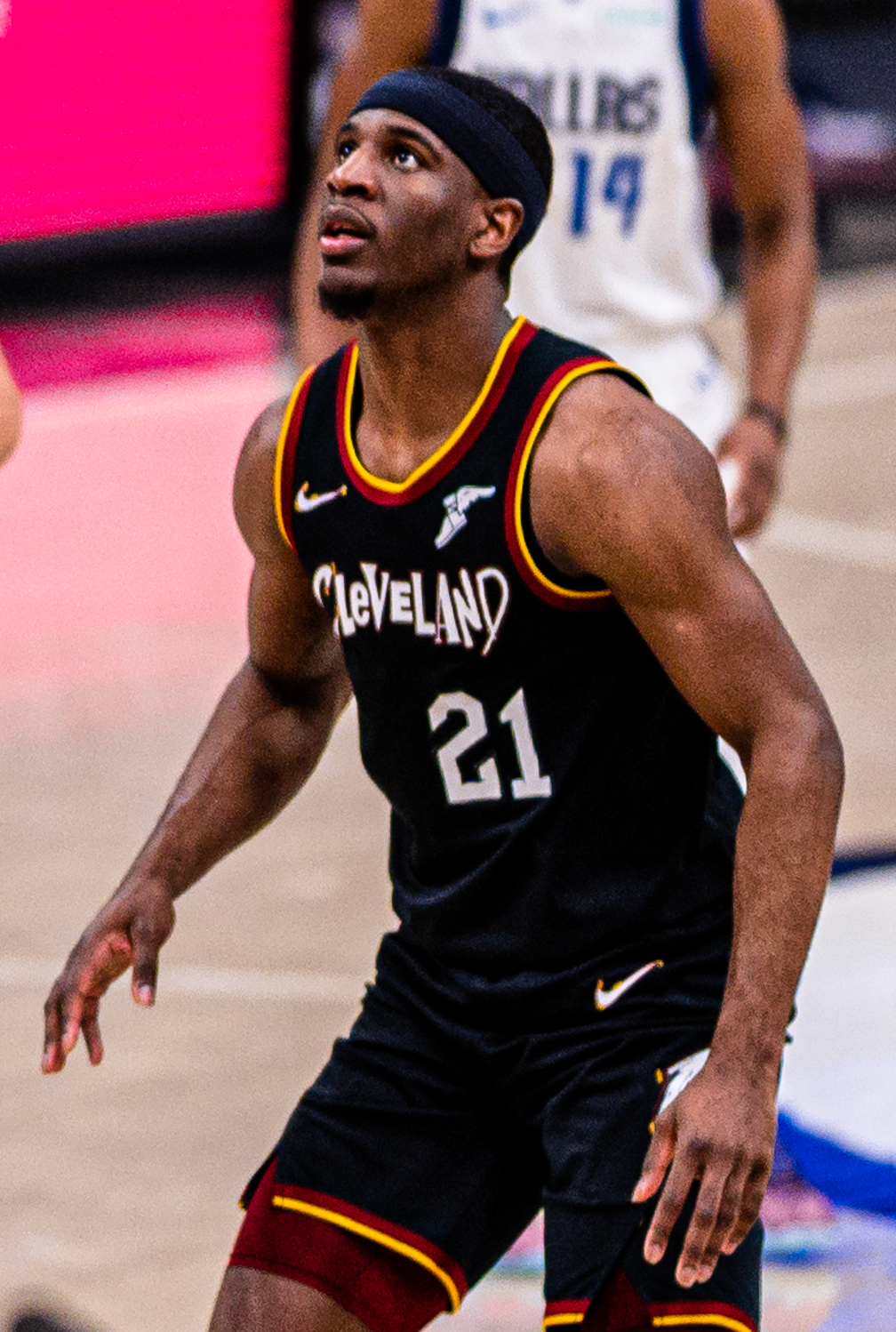
- Dotson with the Cleveland Cavaliers in 2021

No. 1 – Saga Ballooners
- Position: Shooting guard
- League: B.League

Personal information
- Born: May 6, 1994 (age 32) Houston, Texas, U.S.
- Listed height: 6 ft 5 in (1.96 m)
- Listed weight: 210 lb (95 kg)

Career information
- High school: Yates (Houston, Texas)
- College: Oregon (2012–2014); Houston (2015–2017)
- NBA draft: 2017: 2nd round, 44th overall pick
- Drafted by: New York Knicks
- Playing career: 2017–present

Career history
- 2017–2020: New York Knicks
- 2017–2018: →Westchester Knicks
- 2020–2021: Cleveland Cavaliers
- 2021–2022: Austin Spurs
- 2021–2022: New York Knicks
- 2022–2023: Gaziantep Basketbol
- 2023–2024: Ningbo Rockets
- 2024: Nanjing Monkey Kings
- 2024–2025: Petkim Spor
- 2025-present: Saga Ballooners

Career highlights
- First-team All-AAC (2017)
- Stats at NBA.com
- Stats at Basketball Reference

Damyean Da'Kethe Dotson (born May 6, 1994) is an American professional basketball player for the Saga Ballooners of the Japanese B.League. Dotson previously has played for the Cleveland Cavaliers and the New York Knicks in the National Basketball Association. He played college basketball for Oregon and Houston before being selected with the 44th pick of the 2017 NBA draft by the Knicks.

== College career ==
He played two seasons for the University of Oregon. After his sophomore season, he and teammates Dominic Artis and Brandon Austin were dismissed due to sexual assault allegations. No one was ever charged due to a lack of evidence and conflicting statements made by the victim. He subsequently enrolled at Houston Community College where he did not play basketball but took anger management courses with John Lucas II.

He transferred to the University of Houston. As a senior, he averaged 17.4 points and 6.9 rebounds per game and was named to the First Team American Athletic Conference.

== Professional career ==
=== New York Knicks (2017–2020) ===
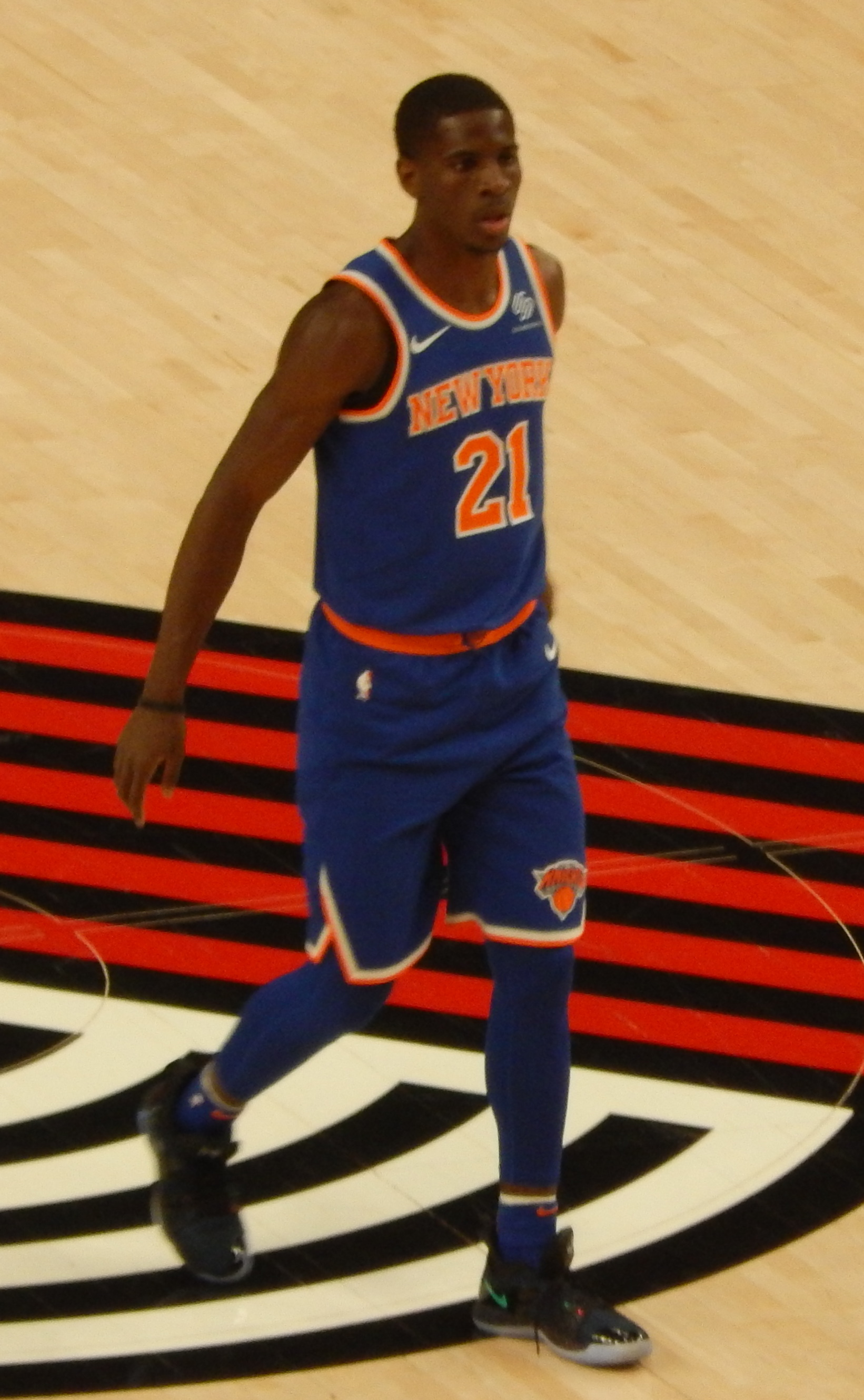
Dotson with the New York Knicks in 2018

On August 7, 2017, Dotson signed with the Knicks and during his rookie season, he received multiple assignments to the Westchester Knicks of the NBA G League. On November 29, Dotson became the eleventh player in history to play in the G League and NBA in the same day. On April 6, 2018, Dotson scored a career-high 30 points and a career high 11 rebounds in a 122–98 win off the bench against the Miami Heat.

=== Cleveland Cavaliers (2020–2021) ===
On November 25, 2020, Dotson signed with the Cleveland Cavaliers. On September 10, 2021, Dotson was waived by the Cavaliers.

=== Austin Spurs (2021) ===
On October 14, 2021, Dotson was signed by the San Antonio Spurs. However, he was waived two days later and joined their G League affiliate, the Austin Spurs on October 27. In 12 games, he averaged 12.9 points, 5.6 rebounds and 3.9 assists over 34.9 minutes per game.

=== New York Knicks (2021–2022) ===
On December 21, 2021, Dotson was signed by the New York Knicks. Dotson was signed on a ten-day deal, via New York's 'hardship' exception. He signed a second ten-day contract with the Knicks on December 31.

=== Return to Austin (2022) ===
On January 11, 2022, Dotson was reacquired by the Austin Spurs.

=== Gaziantep (2022–2023) ===
On June 23, 2022, Dotson signed with Gaziantep Basketbol of the Basketball Super League.

=== Ningbo Rockets (2023–2024) ===
On September 17, 2023, Dotson signed with the Ningbo Rockets of the Chinese Basketball Association.

=== Nanjing Tongxi Monkey Kings (2024) ===
On September 20, 2024, Dotson signed with Nanjing Monkey Kings. He is the second foreign player on the roster as T. J. Leaf signed to the team earlier.

=== Petkim Spor (2024–2025) ===
On November 18, 2024, Dotson signed with Petkim Spor of the Turkish Basketball Super League (BSL).

== Career statistics ==
Legend
GP	Games played	GS	Games started	MPG	Minutes per game
FG%	Field goal percentage	3P%	3-point field goal percentage	FT%	Free throw percentage
RPG	Rebounds per game	APG	Assists per game	SPG	Steals per game
BPG	Blocks per game	PPG	Points per game	**Bold**	Career high

=== NBA ===
==== Regular season ====
Year	Team	GP	GS	MPG	FG%	3P%	FT%	RPG	APG	SPG	BPG	PPG
2017–18	New York	44	2	10.8	**.447**	.324	.696	1.9	0.7	.3	.0	4.1
2018–19	New York	**73**	**40**	**27.5**	.415	**.368**	**.745**	**3.6**	1.8	**.8**	**.1**	**10.7**
2019–20	New York	48	0	17.4	.414	.362	.667	1.9	1.2	.5	**.1**	6.7
2020–21	Cleveland	46	7	19.7	.406	.289	.667	2.0	**2.0**	.3	**.1**	6.7
2021–22	New York	2	0	10.5	.500	.000	—	1.0	.5	.0	.0	2.0
Career		213	49	19.9	.417	.345	.711	2.5	1.5	.5	.1	7.5

=== College ===
Year	Team	GP	GS	MPG	FG%	3P%	FT%	RPG	APG	SPG	BPG	PPG
2012–13	Oregon	**37**	**36**	27.9	.439	.329	.723	3.5	.9	**.9**	.1	11.4
2013–14	Oregon	33	33	23.8	.438	.313	.803	3.2	1.2	.5	**.2**	9.4
2015–16	Houston	32	32	31.0	**.506**	.367	**.833**	6.8	**1.3**	.7	**.2**	13.9
2016–17	Houston	32	32	**34.3**	.470	**.443**	.830	**6.9**	1.1	**.9**	**.2**	**17.4**
Career		134	133	29.1	.464	.380	.796	5.0	1.1	.8	.2	12.9
