= 2018–19 Brooklyn Nets season =

Season of National Basketball Association team the Brooklyn Nets

- Head coach: Kenny Atkinson
- General manager: Sean Marks
- Owners: Mikhail Prokhorov; Joseph Tsai
- Arena: Barclays Center

Results
- Record: 42–40 (.512)
- Place: Division: 4th (Atlantic); Conference: 6th (Eastern)
- Playoff finish: First round (lost to 76ers 1–4)
- Stats at Basketball Reference

Local media
- Television: YES Network, WPIX
- Radio: WFAN AM/FM

The 2018–19 Brooklyn Nets season was the 43rd season of the franchise in the National Basketball Association (NBA), 52nd season overall, and its seventh season playing in the New York City borough of Brooklyn.

On November 12, 2018, late in the first half of the game against the Minnesota Timberwolves, Caris LeVert suffered a subtalar dislocation of the right foot and was scheduled to return later in the season after rehabilitation, making his return on February 8, 2019. The December 16 game against the Atlanta Hawks at Barclays Center was the highest scoring game at the venue in Nets' history, while the 144 points scored by the Nets were the second-most points scored in regulation in franchise history. On March 19, the Nets came back from a 28-point deficit, which also was the biggest comeback in team history, when they defeated the Sacramento Kings 123–121, and also became just the fourth team since the 1954–55 season to overcome a 25-point deficit in the fourth quarter.

For the first time in his NBA career D'Angelo Russell was selected to participate in the NBA All-Star Game when he was announced as the replacement for the injured Victor Oladipo in the 2019 NBA All-Star Game.

With a 108–96 victory over the Indiana Pacers on April 7, the Nets clinched a playoff spot for the first time since the 2014–15 season. On April 10, in a 113–94 win against the Miami Heat, the Nets clinched their first winning season since 2013–14.

In the playoffs, the Nets faced the Philadelphia 76ers in the first round, and were defeated in five games.

== Draft ==
2018 NBA draft picks
Round	Pick	Player	Position	Nationality	School/club
1	29	Džanan Musa	SF	Bosnia and Herzegovina	Cedevita Zagreb
2	40	Rodions Kurucs	SF	Latvia	FC Barcelona Lassa

The Nets entered the draft holding one first-round pick and two second-round picks. It became the last draft year where the effects of their Kevin Garnett and Paul Pierce trade with the Boston Celtics would take effect. The first-round pick along with the second-round pick (40th overall) were acquired on July 13, 2017, in a trade with the Toronto Raptors that sent DeMarre Carroll to the Nets in exchange for Justin Hamilton. The other second-round pick (45th overall) was acquired on February 5, 2018, in a trade with the Milwaukee Bucks that sent Rashad Vaughn to the Nets in exchange for Tyler Zeller. However, just days before draft night, the Nets agreed to trade the 45th pick (which became Hamidou Diallo), another second-round pick, Timofey Mozgov, and cash considerations to the Charlotte Hornets in exchange for Dwight Howard, although the trade would not be official until July 6, 2018. With the Nets' sole first-round pick, Brooklyn selected the Bosnian-born Džanan Musa, a small forward from Croatia's Cedevita Zagreb, while with the second-round pick the Nets selected the Latvian-born small forward Rodions Kurucs from Spain's FC Barcelona Lassa.

== Roster ==
2018–19 Brooklyn Nets roster
Players

Pos.	No.	Player	Height	Weight	DOB	From
C	31	Jarrett Allen	6 ft 11 in (2.11 m)	237 lb (108 kg)	1998-04-21	Texas
F	9	DeMarre Carroll	6 ft 8 in (2.03 m)	215 lb (98 kg)	1986-07-27	Missouri
G/F	33	Allen Crabbe	6 ft 6 in (1.98 m)	212 lb (96 kg)	1992-04-09	California
C	17	Ed Davis	6 ft 10 in (2.08 m)	225 lb (102 kg)	1989-06-05	North Carolina
G	8	Spencer Dinwiddie	6 ft 6 in (1.98 m)	210 lb (95 kg)	1993-04-06	Colorado
F	6	Jared Dudley	6 ft 7 in (2.01 m)	237 lb (108 kg)	1985-07-10	Boston College
F	21	Treveon Graham	6 ft 5 in (1.96 m)	225 lb (102 kg)	1993-10-28	VCU
G/F	12	Joe Harris	6 ft 6 in (1.98 m)	219 lb (99 kg)	1991-09-07	Virginia
F	24	Rondae Hollis-Jefferson	6 ft 7 in (2.01 m)	217 lb (98 kg)	1995-01-03	Arizona
F	00	Rodions Kurucs	6 ft 9 in (2.06 m)	210 lb (95 kg)	1998-02-05	Latvia
G	22	Caris LeVert	6 ft 7 in (2.01 m)	204 lb (93 kg)	1994-08-25	Michigan
G/F	30	Džanan Musa	6 ft 9 in (2.06 m)	208 lb (94 kg)	1999-05-08	Bosnia and Herzegovina
G	13	Shabazz Napier	6 ft 1 in (1.85 m)	180 lb (82 kg)	1991-07-14	Connecticut
G/F	10	Theo Pinson	6 ft 6 in (1.98 m)	218 lb (99 kg)	1995-11-05	North Carolina
G	1	D'Angelo Russell	6 ft 5 in (1.96 m)	198 lb (90 kg)	1996-02-23	Ohio State
F/C	15	Alan Williams (TW)	6 ft 8 in (2.03 m)	265 lb (120 kg)	1993-01-28	UC Santa Barbara

Coaches
Head coach
- Kenny Atkinson
Assistant(s)
- Bret Brielmaier
- Chris Fleming
- Pablo Prigioni
- Jacque Vaughn
- Travon Bryant (assistant/player development)
- Adam Harrington (player development)
- Jordan Ott (advanced scout)

Legend
- (DP) Unsigned draft pick
- (FA) Free agent
- (S) Suspended
- (GL) On assignment to G League affiliate
- (TW) Two-way affiliate player
- Injured

Roster
Updated: April 23, 2019

== Standings ==
=== Division ===
Atlantic Division	W	L	PCT	GB	Home	Road	Div	GP
y – Toronto Raptors	58	24	.707	–	32‍–‍9	26‍–‍15	12–4	82
x – Philadelphia 76ers	51	31	.622	7.0	31‍–‍10	20‍–‍21	8–8	82
x – Boston Celtics	49	33	.598	9.0	28‍–‍13	21‍–‍20	10–6	82
x – Brooklyn Nets	42	40	.512	16.0	23‍–‍18	19‍–‍22	8–8	82
New York Knicks	17	65	.207	41.0	9‍–‍32	8‍–‍33	2–14	82

=== Conference ===
Eastern Conference
#	Team	W	L	PCT	GB	GP
1	z – Milwaukee Bucks *	60	22	.732	–	82
2	y – Toronto Raptors *	58	24	.707	2.0	82
3	x – Philadelphia 76ers	51	31	.622	9.0	82
4	x – Boston Celtics	49	33	.598	11.0	82
5	x – Indiana Pacers	48	34	.585	12.0	82
6	x – Brooklyn Nets	42	40	.512	18.0	82
7	y – Orlando Magic *	42	40	.512	18.0	82
8	x – Detroit Pistons	41	41	.500	19.0	82
9	Charlotte Hornets	39	43	.476	21.0	82
10	Miami Heat	39	43	.476	21.0	82
11	Washington Wizards	32	50	.390	28.0	82
12	Atlanta Hawks	29	53	.354	31.0	82
13	Chicago Bulls	22	60	.268	38.0	82
14	Cleveland Cavaliers	19	63	.232	41.0	82
15	New York Knicks	17	65	.207	43.0	82

== Game log ==
=== Preseason ===
The preseason schedule was announced on July 9, 2018.

2018 preseason game log
Total: 2–2 (home: 0–1; road: 2–1)
Preseason: 2–2 (home: 0–1; road: 2–1)

Game	Date	Team	Score	High points	High rebounds	High assists	Location Attendance	Record
1	October 3	New York	L 102–107	LeVert (15)	Graham (9)	Dinwiddie (6)	Barclays Center; 12,424	0–1
2	October 8	@ Detroit	W 110–108 (OT)	Russell (25)	Davis (10)	LeVert (8)	Little Caesars Arena; 7,691	1–1
3	October 10	@ Toronto	L 91–118	Allen (24)	Dinwiddie (7)	Dinwiddie (8)	Bell Centre; 20,526	1–2
4	October 12	@ New York	W 113–107	Dinwiddie (19)	Davis (8)	Russell (8)	Madison Square Garden; 19,812	2–2

2018–19 preseason schedule

=== Regular season ===
The regular season schedule was released on August 10, 2018.

2018–19 game log
Total: 42–40 (home: 23–18; road: 19–22)
October: 3–5 (home: 2–1; road: 1–4)

Game	Date	Team	Score	High points	High rebounds	High assists	Location Attendance	Record
1	October 17	@ Detroit	L 100–103	LeVert (27)	Allen (10)	Dinwiddie (6)	Little Caesars Arena; 20,332	0–1
2	October 19	New York	W 107–105	LeVert (28)	Allen (11)	Dinwiddie, Russell (6)	Barclays Center; 17,732	1–1
3	October 20	@ Indiana	L 112–132	Harris, LeVert (19)	Davis (8)	Russell (7)	Bankers Life Fieldhouse; 17,007	1–2
4	October 24	@ Cleveland	W 102–86	Russell (18)	Davis (10)	Russell (8)	Quicken Loans Arena; 19,432	2–2
5	October 26	@ New Orleans	L 115–117	Russell (24)	Davis (11)	Dinwiddie (5)	Smoothie King Center; 15,272	2–3
6	October 28	Golden State	L 114–120	Russell (25)	Davis (7)	LeVert (7)	Barclays Center; 17,732	2–4
7	October 29	@ New York	L 96–115	Dinwiddie (17)	Hollis-Jefferson (7)	LeVert (5)	Madison Square Garden; 19,221	2–5
8	October 31	Detroit	W 120–119 (OT)	Dinwiddie (25)	Davis (10)	LeVert, Russell (6)	Barclays Center; 12,862	3–5

November: 5–10 (home: 1–7; road: 4–3)

Game	Date	Team	Score	High points	High rebounds	High assists	Location Attendance	Record
9	November 2	Houston	L 111–119	LeVert (29)	Allen (8)	Harris (4)	Barclays Center; 14,013	3–6
10	November 4	Philadelphia	W 122–97	Hollis-Jefferson, Russell (21)	Allen (10)	Dinwiddie (8)	Barclays Center; 12,826	4–6
11	November 6	@ Phoenix	W 104–82	LeVert (26)	Davis (12)	Allen, Napier (5)	Talking Stick Resort Arena; 14,205	5–6
12	November 9	@ Denver	W 112–110	Russell (23)	Allen (9)	Dinwiddie (6)	Pepsi Center; 19,520	6–6
13	November 10	@ Golden State	L 100–116	Harris (24)	Allen, Davis (7)	Dinwiddie (6)	Oracle Arena; 19,596	6–7
14	November 12	@ Minnesota	L 113–120	Russell (31)	Davis (14)	Russell (6)	Target Center; 10,186	6–8
15	November 14	Miami	L 107–120	Dinwiddie (18)	Davis, Hollis-Jefferson (9)	Dinwiddie, Russell (5)	Barclays Center; 13,317	6–9
16	November 16	@ Washington	W 115–104	Dinwiddie (25)	Allen (12)	Dinwiddie (8)	Capital One Arena; 15,102	7–9
17	November 17	L.A. Clippers	L 119–127	Allen (24)	Allen, Davis (11)	Russell (10)	Barclays Center; 12,944	7–10
18	November 20	@ Miami	W 104–92	Russell (20)	Allen (14)	Dinwiddie (7)	American Airlines Arena; 19,600	8–10
19	November 21	@ Dallas	L 113–119	Crabbe (27)	Davis (9)	Dinwiddie (7)	American Airlines Center; 19,926	8–11
20	November 23	Minnesota	L 102–112	Dinwiddie, Harris (18)	Carroll (7)	Dinwiddie (8)	Barclays Center; 12,814	8–12
21	November 25	Philadelphia	L 125–127	Russell (38)	Allen (10)	Russell (8)	Barclays Center; 15,217	8–13
22	November 28	Utah	L 91–101	Dinwiddie (18)	Hollis-Jefferson (11)	Russell (7)	Barclays Center; 12,928	8–14
23	November 30	Memphis	L 125–131 (2OT)	Russell (26)	Allen, Carroll (12)	Russell (8)	Barclays Center; 12,983	8–15

December: 9–6 (home: 6–3; road: 3–3)

Game	Date	Team	Score	High points	High rebounds	High assists	Location Attendance	Record
24	December 1	@ Washington	L 88–102	Crabbe (14)	Allen, Hollis-Jefferson (8)	Dinwiddie (8)	Capital One Arena; 15,448	8–16
25	December 3	Cleveland	L 97–99	Russell (30)	Davis (10)	Russell (6)	Barclays Center; 10,983	8–17
26	December 5	Oklahoma City	L 112–114	Crabbe (22)	Hollis-Jefferson (9)	Hollis-Jefferson (6)	Barclays Center; 13,161	8–18
27	December 7	Toronto	W 106–105 (OT)	Russell (29)	Davis (15)	Dinwiddie (8)	Barclays Center; 14,035	9–18
28	December 8	@ New York	W 112–104	Dinwiddie (25)	Allen (12)	Russell (11)	Madison Square Garden; 18,662	10–18
29	December 12	@ Philadelphia	W 127–124	Dinwiddie (39)	Davis (10)	Russell (7)	Wells Fargo Center; 20,376	11–18
30	December 14	Washington	W 125–118	Dinwiddie (27)	Hollis-Jefferson (9)	Russell (9)	Barclays Center; 13,232	12–18
31	December 16	Atlanta	W 144–127	Russell (32)	Davis (10)	Russell (7)	Barclays Center; 13,955	13–18
32	December 18	L.A. Lakers	W 115–110	Russell (22)	Allen, Hollis-Jefferson (8)	Russell (13)	Barclays Center; 17,732	14–18
33	December 19	@ Chicago	W 96–93	Dinwiddie (27)	Allen (12)	Harris (4)	United Center; 18,065	15–18
34	December 21	Indiana	L 106–114	Kurucs (24)	Davis (10)	Dinwiddie, Russell (9)	Barclays Center; 13,302	15–19
35	December 23	Phoenix	W 111–103	Dinwiddie (24)	Kurucs (10)	Russell (8)	Barclays Center; 15,310	16–19
36	December 26	Charlotte	W 134–132 (2OT)	Dinwiddie (37)	Hollis-Jefferson (15)	Dinwiddie (11)	Barclays Center; 14,309	17–19
37	December 28	@ Charlotte	L 87–100	Russell (33)	Davis (11)	Dinwiddie (5)	Spectrum Center; 19,411	17–20
38	December 29	@ Milwaukee	L 115–129	Napier (32)	Faried (10)	Napier (7)	Fiserv Forum; 17,918	17–21

January: 11–4 (home: 7–0; road: 4–4)

Game	Date	Team	Score	High points	High rebounds	High assists	Location Attendance	Record
39	January 2	New Orleans	W 126–121	Russell (22)	Davis (12)	Russell (13)	Barclays Center; 16,890	18–21
40	January 4	@ Memphis	W 109–100	Russell (23)	Allen (12)	Russell (10)	FedExForum; 16,683	19–21
41	January 6	@ Chicago	W 117–100	Russell (28)	Davis (13)	Dinwiddie, Russell (5)	United Center; 19,265	20–21
42	January 7	@ Boston	L 95–116	Kurucs (24)	Faried (12)	Napier (6)	TD Garden; 18,624	20–22
43	January 9	Atlanta	W 116–100	Russell (23)	Davis (16)	Dinwiddie (5)	Barclays Center; 14,531	21–22
44	January 11	@ Toronto	L 105–122	Russell (24)	Allen (12)	Russell (9)	Scotiabank Arena; 19,800	21–23
45	January 14	Boston	W 109–102	Russell (34)	Carroll (14)	Russell (7)	Barclays Center; 16,247	22–23
46	January 16	@ Houston	W 145–142 (OT)	Dinwiddie (33)	Allen (24)	Dinwiddie (10)	Toyota Center; 18,055	23–23
47	January 18	@ Orlando	W 117–115	Russell (40)	Allen (10)	Russell (7)	Amway Center; 17,840	24–23
48	January 21	Sacramento	W 123–94	Russell (31)	Davis (16)	Russell (8)	Barclays Center; 14,233	25–23
49	January 23	Orlando	W 114–110	Dinwiddie (29)	Allen (11)	Russell (10)	Barclays Center; 13,185	26–23
50	January 25	New York	W 109–99	Pinson (19)	Davis (16)	Russell (4)	Barclays Center; 17,033	27–23
51	January 28	@ Boston	L 104–112	Russell (25)	Davis (11)	Napier (5)	TD Garden; 18,624	27–24
52	January 29	Chicago	W 122–117	Russell (30)	Allen (8)	Russell (7)	Barclays Center; 12,726	28–24
53	January 31	@ San Antonio	L 114–117	Russell (25)	Davis (11)	Russell (9)	AT&T Center; 18,057	28–25

February: 4–6 (home: 2–4; road: 2–2)

Game	Date	Team	Score	High points	High rebounds	High assists	Location Attendance	Record
54	February 2	@ Orlando	L 89–102	Russell (23)	Davis (16)	Russell (6)	Amway Center; 17,385	28–26
55	February 4	Milwaukee	L 94–113	Russell (18)	Allen (11)	Russell (5)	Barclays Center; 16,209	28–27
56	February 6	Denver	W 135–130	Russell (27)	Carroll (10)	Napier, Russell (11)	Barclays Center; 14,516	29–27
57	February 8	Chicago	L 106–125	Russell (23)	Allen (10)	Russell (6)	Barclays Center; 15,267	29–28
58	February 11	@ Toronto	L 125–127	Russell (28)	Russell (7)	Russell (14)	Scotiabank Arena; 19,800	29–29
59	February 13	@ Cleveland	W 148–139 (3OT)	Russell (36)	Allen (12)	LeVert (9)	Quicken Loans Arena; 17,434	30–29
60	February 21	Portland	L 99–113	Crabbe (17)	Allen (11)	Napier (10)	Barclays Center; 17,732	30–30
61	February 23	@ Charlotte	W 117–115	Russell (40)	Allen (11)	Russell (7)	Spectrum Center; 19,158	31–30
62	February 25	San Antonio	W 101–85	Russell (23)	Carroll (12)	Russell (8)	Barclays Center; 13,479	32–30
63	February 27	Washington	L 116–125	Russell (28)	Graham (7)	Russell (7)	Barclays Center; 13,683	32–31

March: 7–7 (home: 4–1; road: 3–6)

Game	Date	Team	Score	High points	High rebounds	High assists	Location Attendance	Record
64	March 1	Charlotte	L 112–123	Russell (22)	Harris, LeVert (7)	Russell (9)	Barclays Center; 15,578	32–32
65	March 2	@ Miami	L 88–117	Harris (15)	Kurucs (7)	Russell (8)	American Airlines Arena; 19,600	32–33
66	March 4	Dallas	W 127–88	Carroll (22)	Davis (10)	Russell (11)	Barclays Center; 17,064	33–33
67	March 6	Cleveland	W 113–107	Dinwiddie (28)	Davis (12)	Dinwiddie, Russell (5)	Barclays Center; 14,177	34–33
68	March 9	@ Atlanta	W 114–112	Dinwiddie (23)	Allen (12)	Dinwiddie (7)	State Farm Arena; 16,527	35–33
69	March 11	Detroit	W 103–75	Dinwiddie (19)	Crabbe (10)	Russell (7)	Barclays Center; 17,732	36–33
70	March 13	@ Oklahoma City	L 96–108	Dinwiddie (25)	Davis (11)	Russell (7)	Chesapeake Energy Arena; 18,203	36–34
71	March 16	@ Utah	L 98–114	Dinwiddie (22)	Davis (11)	LeVert, Russell (4)	Vivint Smart Home Arena; 18,306	36–35
72	March 17	@ L.A. Clippers	L 116–119	Russell (32)	Allen (11)	Russell (10)	Staples Center; 17,247	36–36
73	March 19	@ Sacramento	W 123–121	Russell (44)	Allen (7)	Russell (12)	Golden 1 Center; 17,583	37–36
74	March 22	@ L.A. Lakers	W 111–106	Harris (26)	Davis (15)	Russell (13)	Staples Center; 18,997	38–36
75	March 25	@ Portland	L 144–148 (2OT)	Russell (39)	Davis (14)	Russell (8)	Moda Center; 20,188	38–37
76	March 28	@ Philadelphia	L 110–123	Harris (22)	Hollis-Jefferson (10)	Russell (8)	Wells Fargo Center; 20,547	38–38
77	March 30	Boston	W 110–96	Russell (29)	Harris (8)	Russell (10)	Barclays Center; 17,732	39–38

April: 3–2 (home: 1–2; road: 2–0)

Game	Date	Team	Score	High points	High rebounds	High assists	Location Attendance	Record
78	April 1	Milwaukee	L 121–131	Russell (28)	Davis (14)	LeVert (6)	Barclays Center; 17,732	39–39
79	April 3	Toronto	L 105–115	Russell (27)	Allen (9)	Russell (6)	Barclays Center; 17,732	39–40
80	April 6	@ Milwaukee	W 133–128	Russell (25)	Allen (7)	Russell (10)	Fiserv Forum; 18,116	40–40
81	April 7	@ Indiana	W 108–96	Russell (20)	Allen (8)	Dinwiddie, Russell (6)	Bankers Life Fieldhouse; 16,197	41–40
82	April 10	Miami	W 113–94	Russell (21)	Allen (14)	Dinwiddie, Napier, Russell (5)	Barclays Center; 17,732	42–40

2018–19 season schedule

=== Playoffs ===
2019 playoff game log
Total: 1–4 (home: 0–2; road: 1–2)
First round: 1–4 (home: 0–2; road: 1–2)

Game	Date	Team	Score	High points	High rebounds	High assists	Location Attendance	Series
1	April 13	@ Philadelphia	W 111–102	Russell (26)	Davis (16)	Dudley, Russell (4)	Wells Fargo Center; 20,437	1–0
2	April 15	@ Philadelphia	L 123–145	Dinwiddie (19)	Allen (6)	Allen (4)	Wells Fargo Center; 20,591	1–1
3	April 18	Philadelphia	L 115–131	LeVert, Russell (26)	LeVert (7)	Hollis-Jefferson, Russell (3)	Barclays Center; 17,732	1–2
4	April 20	Philadelphia	L 108–112	LeVert (25)	Allen (8)	LeVert, Russell (6)	Barclays Center; 17,732	1–3
5	April 23	@ Philadelphia	L 100–122	Hollis-Jefferson (21)	Allen (9)	Napier (10)	Wells Fargo Center; 20,595	1–4

2019 playoff schedule

== Player statistics ==
Legend
GP	Games played	GS	Games started	MPG	Minutes per game
FG%	Field-goal percentage	3P%	3-point field-goal percentage	FT%	Free-throw percentage
RPG	Rebounds per game	APG	Assists per game	SPG	Steals per game
BPG	Blocks per game	PPG	Points per game

=== Regular season statistics ===
As of April 10, 2019

Brooklyn Nets statistics
Player	GP	GS	MPG	FG%	3P%	FT%	RPG	APG	SPG	BPG	PPG
Jarrett Allen	80	80	26.2	.590	.133	.709	8.4	1.4	.5	1.5	10.9
DeMarre Carroll	67	8	25.4	.395	.342	.760	5.2	1.3	.5	.1	11.1
Allen Crabbe	43	20	26.3	.367	.378	.732	3.4	1.1	.5	.3	9.6
Mitch Creek	4	0	9.0	.500	.000	.714	2.5	1.3	.3	.0	3.8
Ed Davis	81	1	17.9	.616	.000	.617	8.6	.8	.4	.4	5.8
Spencer Dinwiddie	68	4	28.1	.442	.335	.806	2.4	4.6	.6	.3	16.8
Jared Dudley	59	25	20.7	.423	.351	.696	2.6	1.4	.6	.3	4.9
Kenneth Faried	12	0	9.8	.595	.200	.625	3.7	.2	.2	.3	5.1
Treveon Graham	35	21	20.4	.335	.297	.818	3.1	1.0	.4	.2	5.3
Joe Harris	76	76	30.2	.500	.474	.827	3.8	2.4	.5	.2	13.7
Rondae Hollis-Jefferson	59	21	20.9	.411	.184	.645	5.3	1.6	.7	.5	8.9
Rodions Kurucs	63	46	20.5	.450	.315	.783	3.9	.8	.7	.4	8.9
Caris LeVert	40	25	26.6	.429	.312	.691	3.8	3.9	1.1	.4	13.7
Tahjere McCall	1	0	8.0	.667	.000	.000	1.0	.0	.0	.0	4.0
Džanan Musa	9	0	4.3	.409	.100	.000	.6	.2	.2	.0	2.1
Shabazz Napier	56	2	17.6	.389	.333	.833	1.8	2.6	.7	.3	9.4
Theo Pinson	18	0	11.7	.342	.261	.864	2.0	1.2	.3	.0	4.5
D'Angelo Russell	81	81	30.2	.434	.369	.780	3.9	7.0	1.2	.2	21.1
Alan Williams	5	0	5.2	.615	.000	.500	3.8	.6	.2	.0	3.6

=== Playoff statistics ===
As of April 23, 2019

Brooklyn Nets statistics
Player	GP	GS	MPG	FG%	3P%	FT%	RPG	APG	SPG	BPG	PPG
Jarrett Allen	5	5	22.0	.594	—	.850	6.8	2.2	.6	.6	11.0
DeMarre Carroll	5	3	23.8	.237	.292	1.000	4.0	.4	.8	.0	6.6
Ed Davis	3	0	13.7	.700	—	1.000	6.3	.7	.0	.3	5.3
Spencer Dinwiddie	5	0	26.2	.435	.375	.714	2.6	1.6	.4	.0	14.6
Jared Dudley	4	2	20.5	.273	.222	1.000	.5	2.8	.8	.3	3.0
Treveon Graham	5	0	15.8	.200	.000	.500	2.2	.6	.4	.2	1.4
Joe Harris	5	5	29.8	.372	.190	1.000	4.2	.6	.6	.0	8.8
Rondae Hollis-Jefferson	4	0	15.5	.485	1.000	.800	3.0	1.5	.3	1.3	13.3
Rodions Kurucs	4	3	17.0	.400	.250	.778	5.0	.8	.5	.0	6.3
Caris LeVert	5	2	28.8	.493	.462	.724	4.6	3.0	1.0	.4	21.0
Džanan Musa	2	0	7.5	.667	.000	—	.0	.0	1.0	.0	2.0
Shabazz Napier	3	0	9.3	.636	.600	.875	2.3	3.7	.3	.0	8.0
Theo Pinson	3	0	7.3	.375	.429	—	1.0	1.0	.7	.0	3.0
D'Angelo Russell	5	5	29.6	.363	.324	.846	3.6	3.6	1.4	.2	19.4

== Transactions ==
=== Trades ===
July 6, 2018	To Brooklyn Nets Dwight Howard	To Charlotte Hornets Timofey Mozgov; Draft rights to Hamidou Diallo; 2021 second-round pick Cash considerations
July 13, 2018	To Brooklyn Nets 2020 protected second-round pick Draft rights to Isaia Cordinier	To Atlanta Hawks Jeremy Lin; 2025 second-round pick Right to swap 2023 second-round pick
July 13, 2018	To Brooklyn Nets Kenneth Faried; Darrell Arthur; 2019 first-round pick 2020 second-round pick	To Denver Nuggets Isaiah Whitehead
July 20, 2018	To Brooklyn Nets Jared Dudley; 2021 protected second-round pick	To Phoenix Suns Darrell Arthur
February 7, 2019	To Brooklyn Nets Greg Monroe; 2021 second-round pick	To Toronto Raptors Cash considerations

=== Additions ===
Date	Player	Former team	Ref
July 17, 2018	Shabazz Napier	Portland Trail Blazers	
July 23, 2018	Ed Davis	Portland Trail Blazers	
July 30, 2018	Treveon Graham	Charlotte Hornets	
August 6, 2018	Theo Pinson	North Carolina Tar Heels	
August 20, 2018	Mitch Creek	s.Oliver Würzburg	
August 20, 2018	Jordan McLaughlin	USC Trojans	
September 19, 2018	Alan Williams	Phoenix Suns	
September 25, 2018	Nuni Omot	Baylor Bears	
October 12, 2018	Drew Gordon	Zenit Saint Petersburg	
October 12, 2018	Tahjere McCall	Long Island Nets	
October 12, 2018	Shannon Scott	Panteras de Miranda	
January 11, 2019	Alan Williams	Long Island Nets	
January 25, 2019	Mitch Creek	Long Island Nets	
February 26, 2019	Tahjere McCall	Long Island Nets	

=== Subtractions ===
Date	Player	New team	Ref
July 5, 2018	Nik Stauskas	Portland Trail Blazers	
July 12, 2018	Dwight Howard	Washington Wizards	
July 20, 2018	Dante Cunningham	San Antonio Spurs	
August 9, 2018	Jahlil Okafor	New Orleans Pelicans	
October 11, 2018	Jordan McLaughlin	Long Island Nets	
October 11, 2018	Nuni Omot	Long Island Nets	
October 12, 2018	Mitch Creek	Long Island Nets	
October 13, 2018	Drew Gordon	Long Island Nets	
October 13, 2018	Tahjere McCall	Long Island Nets	
October 13, 2018	Shannon Scott	Long Island Nets	
January 2, 2019	Alan Williams	Long Island Nets	
January 19, 2019	Kenneth Faried	Houston Rockets	
February 7, 2019	Mitch Creek	Long Island Nets	
February 7, 2019	Greg Monroe	Boston Celtics	
March 8, 2019	Tahjere McCall	Long Island Nets	
