= 2018–19 Detroit Pistons season =

- Head coach: Dwane Casey
- General manager: Ed Stefanski (interim)
- Owner: Tom Gores
- Arena: Little Caesars Arena

Results
- Record: 41–41 (.500)
- Place: Division: 3rd (Central); Conference: 8th (Eastern)
- Playoff finish: First round (lost to Bucks 0–4)
- Stats at Basketball Reference

Local media
- Television: Fox Sports Detroit
- Radio: WXYT

The 2018–19 Detroit Pistons season was the 78th season of the franchise, the 71st in the National Basketball Association (NBA), and the second in Midtown Detroit. This was the first season under new head coach Dwane Casey.

The Pistons qualified for the NBA playoffs during the final game of the regular season with a 115–89 victory over the New York Knicks on April 10. This marked the first time the team qualified for the playoffs since the 2015–16 season and for only the second time in the last ten seasons. In the first round of the playoffs, the Pistons were eliminated by the Milwaukee Bucks in four games, and got swept in the playoffs for the third time since 2009, not winning a playoff game since 2008.

This season would be the last time until 2025 that the Pistons would make the playoffs.

== Offseason ==
On May 7, 2018, the Detroit Pistons fired head coach Stan Van Gundy after the team missed the playoffs for the second consecutive season. On June 11, 2018, the Pistons hired Dwane Casey as head coach.

== Draft picks ==
Round	Pick	Player	Position	Nationality	College / Team
2	42	Bruce Brown	SG	United States	Miami

The Pistons entered the draft with one second-round selection. They had already traded their first-round pick to the Los Angeles Clippers to acquire Blake Griffin in January 2018.

== Roster ==
2018–19 Detroit Pistons roster
Players

Pos.	No.	Player	Height	Weight	DOB	From
G	6	Bruce Brown	6 ft 5 in (1.96 m)	202 lb (92 kg)	1996–08–15	Miami (FL)
G	81	José Calderón	6 ft 3 in (1.91 m)	200 lb (91 kg)	1981–09–28	Spain
C	0	Andre Drummond	6 ft 11 in (2.11 m)	279 lb (127 kg)	1993–08–10	Connecticut
G	20	Wayne Ellington	6 ft 5 in (1.96 m)	200 lb (91 kg)	1987–11–29	North Carolina
G	9	Langston Galloway	6 ft 2 in (1.88 m)	200 lb (91 kg)	1991–12–09	Saint Joseph's
F	23	Blake Griffin	6 ft 10 in (2.08 m)	250 lb (113 kg)	1989–03–16	Oklahoma
G	1	Reggie Jackson	6 ft 3 in (1.91 m)	208 lb (94 kg)	1990–04–16	Boston College
G	5	Luke Kennard	6 ft 5 in (1.96 m)	206 lb (93 kg)	1996–06–24	Duke
F	30	Jon Leuer	6 ft 10 in (2.08 m)	228 lb (103 kg)	1989–05–14	Wisconsin
G	24	Kalin Lucas (TW)	6 ft 1 in (1.85 m)	195 lb (88 kg)	1989–05–24	Michigan State
C	7	Thon Maker	7 ft 1 in (2.16 m)	221 lb (100 kg)	1997–02–25	Orangeville Prep (CAN)
F	19	Sviatoslav Mykhailiuk	6 ft 8 in (2.03 m)	205 lb (93 kg)	1997–06–10	Kansas
C	27	Zaza Pachulia	6 ft 11 in (2.11 m)	270 lb (122 kg)	1984–02–10	Georgia
G/F	22	Glenn Robinson	6 ft 6 in (1.98 m)	222 lb (101 kg)	1994–01–08	Michigan
G	14	Ish Smith	6 ft 0 in (1.83 m)	175 lb (79 kg)	1988–07–05	Wake Forest
G	13	Khyri Thomas	6 ft 3 in (1.91 m)	210 lb (95 kg)	1996–05–08	Creighton
G	12	Isaiah Whitehead (TW)	6 ft 4 in (1.93 m)	213 lb (97 kg)	1995–03–08	Seton Hall

Coaches
Head coach
- Dwane Casey
Assistant(s)
- Tim Grgurich
- Sidney Lowe
- Micah Nori
- Sean Sweeney
- DJ Bakker (player development)
- JD Dubois (player development)
- Bryston Williams (player development)

Legend
- (DP) Unsigned draft pick
- (FA) Free agent
- (S) Suspended
- (GL) On assignment to G League affiliate
- (TW) Two-way affiliate player
- Injured

Roster
Updated: 2019–03–10

== Standings ==
=== Division ===
Central Division	W	L	PCT	GB	Home	Road	Div	GP
z – Milwaukee Bucks	60	22	.732	–	33‍–‍8	27‍–‍14	14–2	82
x – Indiana Pacers	48	34	.585	12.0	29‍–‍12	19‍–‍22	11–5	82
x – Detroit Pistons	41	41	.500	19.0	26‍–‍15	15‍–‍26	8–8	82
Chicago Bulls	22	60	.268	38.0	9‍–‍32	13‍–‍28	3–13	82
Cleveland Cavaliers	19	63	.232	41.0	13‍–‍28	6‍–‍35	4–12	82

=== Conference ===
Eastern Conference
#	Team	W	L	PCT	GB	GP
1	z – Milwaukee Bucks *	60	22	.732	–	82
2	y – Toronto Raptors *	58	24	.707	2.0	82
3	x – Philadelphia 76ers	51	31	.622	9.0	82
4	x – Boston Celtics	49	33	.598	11.0	82
5	x – Indiana Pacers	48	34	.585	12.0	82
6	x – Brooklyn Nets	42	40	.512	18.0	82
7	y – Orlando Magic *	42	40	.512	18.0	82
8	x – Detroit Pistons	41	41	.500	19.0	82
9	Charlotte Hornets	39	43	.476	21.0	82
10	Miami Heat	39	43	.476	21.0	82
11	Washington Wizards	32	50	.390	28.0	82
12	Atlanta Hawks	29	53	.354	31.0	82
13	Chicago Bulls	22	60	.268	38.0	82
14	Cleveland Cavaliers	19	63	.232	41.0	82
15	New York Knicks	17	65	.207	43.0	82

== Game log ==
=== Preseason ===
2018 preseason game log
Total: 2–3 (home: 0–2; road: 2–1)
Preseason: 2–3 (home: 0–2; road: 2–1)

Game	Date	Team	Score	High points	High rebounds	High assists	Location Attendance	Record
1	October 3	@ Oklahoma City	W 97–91	Andre Drummond (31)	Andre Drummond (16)	Ish Smith (5)	Chesapeake Energy Arena; 18,203	1–0
2	October 5	@ San Antonio	L 93–117	Andre Drummond (18)	Andre Drummond (10)	Ish Smith (6)	AT&T Center; 18,121	1–1
3	October 8	Brooklyn	L 108–110 (OT)	Langston Galloway (24)	Andre Drummond (10)	Ish Smith (10)	Little Caesars Arena; 7,691	1–2
4	October 10	Washington	L 97–102	Andre Drummond (17)	Andre Drummond (20)	Blake Griffin (4)	Little Caesars Arena; 9,117	1–3
5	October 12	@ Cleveland	W 129–110	Blake Griffin (29)	Andre Drummond (15)	Griffin, Jackson (5)	Breslin Student Events Center; 7,517	2–3

2018–19 season schedule

=== Regular season ===
2018–19 game log
Total: 41–41 (home: 26–15; road: 15–26)
October: 4–3 (home: 3–1; road: 1–2)

Game	Date	Team	Score	High points	High rebounds	High assists	Location Attendance	Record
1	October 17	Brooklyn	W 103–100	Blake Griffin (26)	Andre Drummond (20)	Blake Griffin (6)	Little Caesars Arena; 20,332	1–0
2	October 20	@ Chicago	W 118–116	Blake Griffin (33)	Andre Drummond (13)	Reggie Jackson (6)	United Center; 21,289	2–0
3	October 23	Philadelphia	W 133–132 (OT)	Blake Griffin (50)	Andre Drummond (16)	Blake Griffin (6)	Little Caesars Arena; 14,418	3–0
4	October 25	Cleveland	W 110–103	Drummond & Griffin (26)	Andre Drummond (22)	Reggie Bullock (6)	Little Caesars Arena; 15,896	4–0
5	October 27	Boston	L 89–109	Andre Drummond (18)	Andre Drummond (8)	Reggie Jackson (4)	Little Caesars Arena; 18,120	4–1
6	October 30	@ Boston	L 105–108	Blake Griffin (24)	Blake Griffin (15)	Stanley Johnson (4)	TD Garden; 18,624	4–2
7	October 31	@ Brooklyn	L 119–120 (OT)	Blake Griffin (25)	Andre Drummond (23)	Griffin & Smith (4)	Barclays Center; 12,862	4–3

November : 8–4 (home: 5–2; road: 3–2)

Game	Date	Team	Score	High points	High rebounds	High assists	Location Attendance	Record
8	November 3	@ Philadelphia	L 99–109	Blake Griffin (38)	Blake Griffin (13)	Blake Griffin (6)	Wells Fargo Center; 20,289	4–4
9	November 5	Miami	L 115–120 (OT)	Drummond & Jackson (25)	Andre Drummond (21)	Blake Griffin (7)	Little Caesars Arena; 14,148	4–5
10	November 7	@ Orlando	W 103–96	Andre Drummond (23)	Andre Drummond (19)	Jackson & Smith (4)	Amway Center; 16,103	5–5
11	November 9	@ Atlanta	W 124–109	Andre Drummond (23)	Andre Drummond (11)	Blake Griffin (9)	State Farm Arena; 14,759	6–5
12	November 11	Charlotte	L 103–113	Bullock & Drummond (23)	Andre Drummond (22)	Reggie Jackson (7)	Little Caesars Arena; 15,133	6–6
13	November 14	@ Toronto	W 106–104	Blake Griffin (30)	Andre Drummond (14)	Reggie Jackson (6)	Scotiabank Arena; 19,800	7–6
14	November 19	Cleveland	W 113–102	Andre Drummond (23)	Andre Drummond (16)	Blake Griffin (5)	Little Caesars Arena; 15,769	8–6
15	November 21	@ Houston	L 124–126	Blake Griffin (37)	Drummond & Griffin (11)	Reggie Bullock (6)	Toyota Center; 18,055	8–7
16	November 23	Houston	W 116–111 (OT)	Blake Griffin (28)	Andre Drummond (20)	Reggie Jackson (6)	Little Caesars Arena; 17,268	9–7
17	November 25	Phoenix	W 118–107	Drummond & Jackson (19)	Andre Drummond (16)	Blake Griffin (11)	Little Caesars Arena; 14,413	10–7
18	November 27	New York	W 115–108	Blake Griffin (30)	Andre Drummond (14)	Ish Smith (7)	Little Caesars Arena; 13,935	11–7
19	November 30	Chicago	W 107–88	Griffin & Jackson (20)	Andre Drummond (19)	Reggie Bullock (6)	Little Caesars Arena; 15,372	12–7

December : 4–11 (home: 3–5; road: 1–6)

Game	Date	Team	Score	High points	High rebounds	High assists	Location Attendance	Record
20	December 1	Golden State	W 111–102	Blake Griffin (26)	Andre Drummond (19)	Griffin & Jackson (5)	Little Caesars Arena; 20,332	13–7
21	December 3	Oklahoma City	L 83–110	Blake Griffin (20)	Drummond, Pachulia & Robinson III (6)	Blake Griffin (4)	Little Caesars Arena; 14,372	13–8
22	December 5	@ Milwaukee	L 92–115	Blake Griffin (31)	Stanley Johnson (9)	Reggie Jackson (6)	Fiserv Forum; 16,541	13–9
23	December 7	Philadelphia	L 111–117	Blake Griffin (31)	Blake Griffin (12)	Blake Griffin (6)	Little Caesars Arena; 15,680	13–10
24	December 9	New Orleans	L 108–116	Blake Griffin (35)	Andre Drummond (19)	José Calderón (9)	Little Caesars Arena; 14,705	13–11
25	December 10	@ Philadelphia	L 102–116	Luke Kennard (28)	Andre Drummond (17)	Reggie Jackson (7)	Wells Fargo Center; 20,199	13–12
26	December 12	@ Charlotte	L 107–108	Blake Griffin (26)	Andre Drummond (13)	Blake Griffin (7)	Spectrum Center; 13,997	13–13
27	December 15	Boston	W 113–104	Blake Griffin (27)	Andre Drummond (20)	José Calderón (8)	Little Caesars Arena; 14,500	14–13
28	December 17	Milwaukee	L 104–107	Reggie Bullock (24)	Andre Drummond (14)	Blake Griffin (11)	Little Caesars Arena; 15,051	14–14
29	December 19	@ Minnesota	W 129–123 (OT)	Blake Griffin (34)	Andre Drummond (16)	José Calderón (7)	Target Center; 15,883	15–14
30	December 21	@ Charlotte	L 86–98	Blake Griffin (23)	Andre Drummond (16)	Blake Griffin (5)	Spectrum Center; 15,812	15–15
31	December 23	Atlanta	L 95–98	Langston Galloway (18)	Andre Drummond (15)	Reggie Jackson (5)	Little Caesars Arena; 15,532	15–16
32	December 26	Washington	W 106–95	Blake Griffin (23)	Andre Drummond (11)	Griffin & Jackson (6)	Little Caesars Arena; 17,534	16–16
33	December 28	@ Indiana	L 88–125	Blake Griffin (18)	Andre Drummond (12)	José Calderón (7)	Bankers Life Fieldhouse; 17,923	16–17
34	December 30	@ Orlando	L 107–109	Bullock & Griffin (15)	Andre Drummond (15)	Blake Griffin (5)	Amway Center; 17,761	16–18

January : 6–10 (home: 3–4; road: 3–6)

Game	Date	Team	Score	High points	High rebounds	High assists	Location Attendance	Record
35	January 1	@ Milwaukee	L 98–121	Blake Griffin (29)	Griffin & Leuer (9)	Blake Griffin (4)	Fiserv Forum; 17,534	16–19
36	January 2	@ Memphis	W 101–94	Blake Griffin (26)	Andre Drummond (10)	Blake Griffin (7)	FedExForum; 14,109	17–19
37	January 5	Utah	L 105–110	Blake Griffin (34)	Andre Drummond (18)	Bruce Brown Jr. (7)	Little Caesars Arena; 17,255	17–20
38	January 7	San Antonio	L 107–119	Blake Griffin (34)	Andre Drummond (14)	Blake Griffin (8)	Little Caesars Arena; 13,107	17–21
39	January 9	@ LA Lakers	L 100–113	Blake Griffin (16)	Andre Drummond (17)	Blake Griffin (6)	Staples Center; 18,997	17–22
40	January 10	@ Sacramento	L 102–112	Stanley Johnson (16)	Andre Drummond (11)	Bullock & Calderón (6)	Golden 1 Center; 16,916	17–23
41	January 12	@ LA Clippers	W 109–104	Blake Griffin (44)	Andre Drummond (21)	Blake Griffin (5)	Staples Center; 16,540	18–23
42	January 14	@ Utah	L 94–100	Blake Griffin (19)	Andre Drummond (13)	Griffin & Jackson (4)	Vivint Smart Home Arena; 18,306	18–24
43	January 16	Orlando	W 120–115 (OT)	Blake Griffin (30)	Andre Drummond (22)	Reggie Bullock (6)	Little Caesars Arena; 14,019	19–24
44	January 18	Miami	W 98–93	Blake Griffin (32)	Blake Griffin (11)	Blake Griffin (9)	Little Caesars Arena; 17,228	20–24
45	January 19	Sacramento	L 101–103	Blake Griffin (38)	Zaza Pachulia (12)	Brown & Calderón (4)	Little Caesars Arena; 15,377	20–25
46	January 21	@ Washington	L 87–101	Blake Griffin (29)	Blake Griffin (9)	Brown, Bullock, Calderón & Griffin (4)	Capital One Arena; 16,229	20–26
47	January 23	@ New Orleans	W 98–94	Blake Griffin (37)	Zaza Pachulia (10)	Blake Griffin (7)	Smoothie King Center; 18,181	21–26
48	January 25	@ Dallas	L 101–106	Blake Griffin (35)	Andre Drummond (15)	Reggies Jackson (9)	American Airlines Center; 20,327	21–27
49	January 29	Milwaukee	L 105–115	Reggie Jackson (25)	Andre Drummond (13)	Blake Griffin (9)	Little Caesars Arena; 14,187	21–28
50	January 31	Dallas	W 93–89	Drummond & Griffin (24)	Andre Drummond (20)	Reggie Jackson (9)	Little Caesars Arena; 14,075	22–28

February : 7–3 (home: 4–1; road: 3–2)

Game	Date	Team	Score	High points	High rebounds	High assists	Location Attendance	Record
51	February 2	LA Clippers	L 101–111	Reggie Jackson (29)	Drummond & Griffin (11)	Reggie Jackson (7)	Little Caesars Arena; 17,862	22–29
52	February 4	Denver	W 129–103	Andre Drummond (27)	Andre Drummond (12)	Ish Smith (5)	Little Caesars Arena; 12,589	23–29
53	February 5	@ New York	W 105–92	Blake Griffin (29)	Andre Drummond (16)	Blake Griffin (8)	Madison Square Garden; 17,853	24–29
54	February 8	New York	W 120–103	Andre Drummond (29)	Andre Drummond (20)	Reggie Jackson (6)	Little Caesars Arena; 14,430	25–29
55	February 11	Washington	W 121–112	Andre Drummond (32)	Andre Drummond (17)	Blake Griffin (9)	Little Caesars Arena; 15,246	26–29
56	February 13	@ Boston	L 110–118	Blake Griffin (32)	Andre Drummond (17)	Griffin & Kennard (5)	TD Garden; 18,624	26–30
All-Star Break
57	February 22	@ Atlanta	W 125–122	Reggie Jackson (32)	Andre Drummond (21)	Reggie Jackson (8)	State Farm Arena; 14,067	27–30
58	February 23	@ Miami	W 119–96	Ish Smith (22)	Andre Drummond (14)	Ish Smith (9)	American Airlines Arena; 19,600	28–30
59	February 25	Indiana	W 113–109	Andre Drummond (26)	Andre Drummond (16)	Blake Griffin (10)	Little Caesars Arena; 15,321	29–30
60	February 27	@ San Antonio	L 93–105	Reggie Jackson (22)	Andre Drummond (17)	Blake Griffin (7)	AT&T Center; 18,354	29–31

March : 10–6 (home: 7–0; road: 3–6)

Game	Date	Team	Score	High points	High rebounds	High assists	Location Attendance	Record
61	March 2	@ Cleveland	W 129–93	Luke Kennard (26)	Andre Drummond (10)	Blake Griffin (9)	Quicken Loans Arena; 19,432	30–31
62	March 3	Toronto	W 112–107 (OT)	Blake Griffin (27)	Andre Drummond (17)	Ish Smith (8)	Little Caesars Arena; 19,161	31–31
63	March 6	Minnesota	W 131–114	Andre Drummond (31)	Andre Drummond (15)	Blake Griffin (7)	Little Caesars Arena; 15,240	32–31
64	March 8	@ Chicago	W 112–104	Blake Griffin (27)	Andre Drummond (24)	Ish Smith (7)	United Center; 21,048	33–31
65	March 10	Chicago	W 131–108	Blake Griffin (28)	Andre Drummond (15)	Reggie Jackson (6)	Little Caesars Arena; 19,356	34–31
66	March 11	@ Brooklyn	L 75–103	Andre Drummond (13)	Andre Drummond (20)	Blake Griffin (6)	Barclays Center; 17,732	34–32
67	March 13	@ Miami	L 74–108	Blake Griffin (13)	Andre Drummond (9)	Luke Kennard (4)	American Airlines Arena; 19,600	34–33
68	March 15	LA Lakers	W 111–97	Reggie Jackson (20)	Andre Drummond (23)	Blake Griffin (9)	Little Caesars Arena; 20,768	35–33
69	March 17	Toronto	W 110–107	Blake Griffin (25)	Andre Drummond (17)	Ish Smith (8)	Little Caesars Arena; 19,277	36–33
70	March 18	@ Cleveland	L 119–126	Wayne Ellington (25)	Andre Drummond (21)	Drummond & Smith (5)	Quicken Loans Arena; 18,465	36–34
71	March 21	@ Phoenix	W 118–98	Wayne Ellington (23)	Andre Drummond (19)	Blake Griffin (8)	Talking Stick Resort Arena; 16,066	37–34
72	March 23	@ Portland	L 112–117	Blake Griffin (27)	Andre Drummond (11)	Blake Griffin (6)	Moda Center; 19,815	37–35
73	March 24	@ Golden State	L 114–121	Blake Griffin (24)	Andre Drummond (11)	Blake Griffin (8)	Oracle Arena; 19,596	37–36
74	March 26	@ Denver	L 92–95	Blake Griffin (29)	Andre Drummond (18)	Griffin & Jackson (5)	Pepsi Center; 19,520	37–37
75	March 28	Orlando	W 115–98	Wayne Ellington (25)	Andre Drummond (17)	Ish Smith (7)	Little Caesars Arena; 18,128	38–37
76	March 30	Portland	W 99–90	Reggie Jackson (28)	Andre Drummond (19)	Reggie Jackson (5)	Little Caesars Arena; 18,592	39–37

April : 2–4 (home: 1–2; road: 1–2)

Game	Date	Team	Score	High points	High rebounds	High assists	Location Attendance	Record
77	April 1	@ Indiana	L 102–111	Wayne Ellington (26)	Andre Drummond (17)	Andre Drummond (5)	Bankers Life Fieldhouse; 15,760	39–38
78	April 3	Indiana	L 89–108	Andre Drummond (28)	Andre Drummond (19)	Ish Smith (7)	Little Caesars Arena; 18,984	39–39
79	April 5	@ Oklahoma City	L 110–123	Blake Griffin (45)	Andre Drummond (9)	Ish Smith (4)	Chesapeake Energy Arena; 18,203	39–40
80	April 7	Charlotte	L 91–104	Ish Smith (20)	Andre Drummond (23)	Griffin & Smith (4)	Little Caesars Arena; 19,871	39–41
81	April 9	Memphis	W 100–93	Ish Smith (22)	Andre Drummond (17)	Reggie Jackson (5)	Little Caesars Arena; 19,802	40–41
82	April 10	@ New York	W 115–89	Luke Kennard (27)	Andre Drummond (18)	Reggie Jackson (7)	Madison Square Garden; 19,812	41–41

2018–19 season schedule

== Playoffs ==
=== Game log ===
2019 playoff game log
Total: 0–4 (home: 0–2; road: 0–2)
First Round: 0–4 (home: 0–2; road: 0–2)

Game	Date	Team	Score	High points	High rebounds	High assists	Location Attendance	Series
1	April 14	@ Milwaukee	L 86–121	Luke Kennard (21)	Andre Drummond (12)	Ish Smith (6)	Fiserv Forum; 17,529	0–1
2	April 17	@ Milwaukee	L 99–120	Luke Kennard (19)	Andre Drummond (16)	Reggie Jackson (8)	Fiserv Forum; 17,513	0–2
3	April 20	Milwaukee	L 103–119	Blake Griffin (27)	Andre Drummond (12)	Reggie Jackson (8)	Little Caesars Arena; 20,520	0–3
4	April 22	Milwaukee	L 104–127	Reggie Jackson (26)	Andre Drummond (12)	Reggie Jackson (7)	Little Caesars Arena; 20,332	0–4

2019 playoff schedule

== Player statistics ==
=== Regular season ===
Player	Pos.	GP	GS	MP	Reb.	Ast.	Stl.	Blk.	Pts.
Bruce Brown	SG	74	56	1,449	185	91	40	36	319
Reggie Bullock^{†}	SG	44	44	1,355	123	109	24	5	534
José Calderón	PG	49	0	632	60	115	16	3	113
Andre Drummond	C	79	79	2,647	1,232	112	136	138	1,370
Henry Ellenson^{‡}	PF	2	0	25	9	1	0	0	12
Wayne Ellington^{≠}	SG	28	26	764	60	43	30	3	336
Langston Galloway	SG	80	4	1,745	171	85	37	8	672
Blake Griffin	PF	75	75	2,622	565	402	52	28	1,841
Reggie Jackson	PG	82	82	2,289	216	344	55	9	1,260
Stanley Johnson^{†}	SF	48	7	961	175	60	48	13	358
Luke Kennard	SG	63	10	1,437	183	114	26	10	613
Jon Leuer	PF	41	1	402	97	14	12	4	156
Zach Lofton^{‡}	SG	1	0	4	0	0	1	0	0
Kalin Lucas^{≠}	PG	1	0	6	3	1	0	0	2
Thon Maker^{≠}	PF	29	5	563	106	27	11	33	159
Sviatoslav Mykhailiuk^{≠}	SF	3	0	20	2	4	1	0	6
Zaza Pachulia	C	68	3	878	265	91	31	17	267
Glenn Robinson	SF	47	18	610	71	21	14	8	198
Ish Smith	PG	56	0	1,251	145	203	28	11	501
Khyri Thomas	SG	26	0	195	20	8	7	5	61

After all games.
^{‡}Waived during the season
^{†}Traded during the season
^{≠}Acquired during the season

=== Playoffs ===
Player	Pos.	GP	GS	MP	Reb.	Ast.	Stl.	Blk.	Pts.
Bruce Brown	SG	4	2	57	8	2	2	1	13
José Calderón	PG	3	0	10	0	5	1	0	0
Andre Drummond	C	4	4	127	52	9	6	5	57
Wayne Ellington	SG	4	4	131	15	5	3	0	31
Langston Galloway	SG	4	0	110	15	4	2	4	31
Blake Griffin	PF	2	2	58	12	12	2	0	49
Reggie Jackson	PG	4	4	108	13	28	3	0	71
Luke Kennard	SG	4	2	133	16	7	3	1	60
Jon Leuer	PF	1	0	5	0	0	0	0	2
Thon Maker	PF	4	2	69	9	4	0	4	22
Zaza Pachulia	C	2	0	22	9	0	0	0	5
Glenn Robinson	SF	3	0	36	7	2	2	0	13
Ish Smith	PG	4	0	81	11	14	3	1	24
Khyri Thomas	SG	3	0	15	2	0	2	0	14

== Transactions ==
=== Overview ===
Players Added

Via draft

- Bruce Brown Jr.

Via trade

- Thon Maker
- Sviatoslav Mykhailiuk
- Khyri Thomas

Via free agency

- José Calderón
- Wayne Ellington
- Kalin Lucas
- Zaza Pachulia
- Glenn Robinson III
- Isaiah Whitehead
Players Lost

Via trade

- Reggie Bullock
- Stanley Johnson

Via free agency

- James Ennis III
- Kay Felder
- Jameer Nelson
- Anthony Tolliver

Waived

- Dwight Buycks
- Henry Ellenson
- Keenan Evans
- Johnny Hamilton
- Reggie Hearn
- Scottie Lindsey
- Zach Lofton
- Chris McCullough
- Eric Moreland

=== Trades ===
June 21, 2018	To Detroit Pistons Draft rights to Khyri Thomas	To Philadelphia 76ers Two future 2nd-round draft picks
February 6, 2019	To Detroit Pistons Sviatoslav Mykhailiuk; Future 2nd-round draft pick	To Los Angeles Lakers Reggie Bullock
February 7, 2019	Three-team trade
February 7, 2019	To Milwaukee Bucks Nikola Mirotić (from New Orleans)	To New Orleans Pelicans Stanley Johnson (from Detroit) Jason Smith (from Milwaukee) Four future 2nd-round draft picks
February 7, 2019	To Detroit Pistons Thon Maker (from Milwaukee)

=== Free agency ===
==== Additions ====
Date	Player	Contract terms	Former team	Ref.
July 7	José Calderón	1-year contract worth $2.39 million	Cleveland Cavaliers	
July 7	Glenn Robinson III	1-year contract worth $4.08 million	Indiana Pacers	
July 15	Zaza Pachulia	1-year contract worth $2.4 million	Golden State Warriors	
January 17	Kalin Lucas	Two-way contract	Stockton Kings	
January 17	Isaiah Whitehead	Two-way contract	(Russia) Lokomotiv Kuban	
February 9	Wayne Ellington		Miami Heat	

==== Subtractions ====
Date	Player	Contract terms	New team	Ref.
July 1	Jameer Nelson			
July 7	Dwight Buycks	Waived	(China) Shenzhen Leopards	
July 8	Eric Moreland	Waived	Toronto Raptors	
July 9	Anthony Tolliver	1-year contract worth $5.75 million	Minnesota Timberwolves	
July 13	James Ennis III	2-year contract worth $3.47 million	Houston Rockets	
August 21	Kay Felder		Toronto Raptors	
September 25	Scottie Lindsey	Waived		
October 7	Chris McCullough	Waived	(China) Shanxi Brave Dragons	
October 12	Johnny Hamilton	Waived		
October 15	Reggie Hearn	Waived		
January 17	Keenan Evans	Waived		
January 17	Zach Lofton	Waived		
February 9	Henry Ellenson	Waived	New York Knicks	

== Awards ==
Player	Award	Date awarded	Ref.
Andre Drummond	Eastern Conference Player of the Week	March 10, 2019	
