= Henry Ellenson =

American basketball player (born 1997)

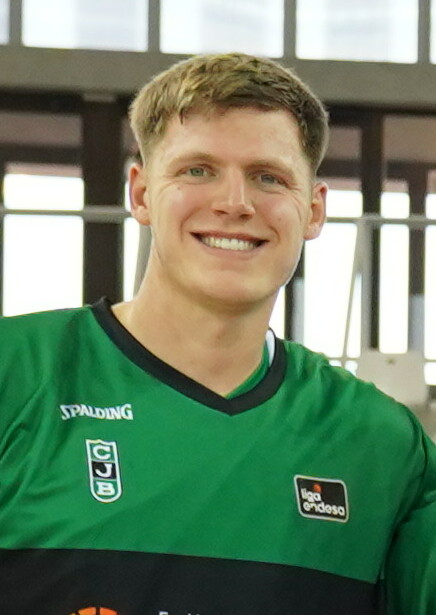
- Ellenson with Joventut Badalona in 2022

No. 9 – Wonju DB Promy
- Position: Power forward / center
- League: Korean Basketball League

Personal information
- Born: January 13, 1997 (age 29) Rice Lake, Wisconsin, U.S.
- Listed height: 6 ft 10 in (2.08 m)
- Listed weight: 240 lb (109 kg)

Career information
- High school: Rice Lake (Rice Lake, Wisconsin)
- College: Marquette (2015–2016)
- NBA draft: 2016: 1st round, 18th overall pick
- Drafted by: Detroit Pistons
- Playing career: 2016–present

Career history
- 2016–2019: Detroit Pistons
- 2016–2019: →Grand Rapids Drive
- 2019: New York Knicks
- 2019–2020: Brooklyn Nets
- 2019: →Long Island Nets
- 2020–2021: Raptors 905
- 2021: Toronto Raptors
- 2021–2022: Monbus Obradoiro
- 2022–2023: Joventut Badalona
- 2024–2025: Wisconsin Herd
- 2025–present: Wonju DB Promy

Career highlights
- All-NBA G League Second Team (2021); First-team All-Big East (2016); Big East Rookie of the Year (2016); McDonald's All-American (2015); First-team Parade All-American (2015); Co-Wisconsin Mr. Basketball (2015)
- Stats at NBA.com
- Stats at Basketball Reference
Medals
Men's basketball
Representing United States
FIBA World U17 Championship
Gold medal – first place	2014 Dubai	National team

Henry John Ellenson (born January 13, 1997) is an American professional basketball player for the Wonju DB Promy of the Korean Basketball League (KBL). He played one season of college basketball for Marquette, before being drafted 18th overall by the Detroit Pistons in the 2016 NBA draft.

== High school career ==
Ellenson played basketball at Rice Lake High School, where he also competed in track and field (high jump and discus). In August 2014, he was a member of the United States' National Team at the 2014 FIBA Under-17 World Championship in Dubai, scoring 21 points in the quarterfinal game with China.

As a freshman in the 2011–12 season, Ellenson averaged 12.0 points, 7.0 rebounds, 1.5 assists and 1.5 blocks per game. As a sophomore in the 2012–13 season, Ellenson averaged 21.5 points, 11.8 rebounds, 3.5 assists and 1.8 blocks per game.

=== Career highlights and awards ===
- Ellenson scored a career-high 48 points against Minnetonka High School on December 6, 2014
- 2012 All-Big Rivers Conference
- 2013 Associated Press All-State second team
- 2013 Big Rivers Conference Player of the Year and All-Big Rivers first team
- 2013 Eau Claire Leader-Telegram All-Northwest first team
- 2013 Eau Claire Leader-Telegram Northwest Wisconsin Player of the Year, first sophomore to win the award
- 2013 MaxPreps Sophomore All-America honorable mention
- 2013 St. Paul Pioneer Press East Metro Player of the Year
- 2013 Wisconsin Basketball Coaches Association Division 2 All-State first team

== College career ==
During his only season at Marquette, Ellenson averaged a near-double-double with 17 points and 9.7 rebounds per game, with 1.8 assists and 1.5 blocks in 33.5 minutes of action over 33 games. As a result, he earned All-Big East First Team, Big East All-Freshmen Team, and Big East Freshman of the Year honors.

On April 5, 2016, Ellenson declared for the NBA draft, forgoing his final three years of college eligibility.

== Professional career ==
=== Detroit Pistons (2016–2019) ===
On June 23, 2016, Ellenson was selected by the Detroit Pistons with the 18th overall pick in the 2016 NBA draft. On July 19, he signed his rookie scale contract with the Pistons. On October 26, he made his professional debut in a 109–91 loss to the Toronto Raptors, recording two rebounds in two minutes off the bench. During his rookie season, Ellenson had multiple assignments with the Grand Rapids Drive, the Pistons' D-League affiliate. On February 9, 2019, Ellenson was released by the Pistons.

=== New York Knicks (2019) ===
On February 20, 2019, Ellenson signed a 10-day contract with the New York Knicks. After several productive games, he signed a standard contract with the Knicks on March 2. On June 30, 2019, Ellenson joined the Knicks for the 2019 NBA Summer League.

=== Brooklyn Nets (2019–2020) ===
On July 17, 2019, Ellenson signed a two-way contract with the Brooklyn Nets. On January 3, 2020, the Nets waived Ellenson after he appeared in five games.

=== Raptors 905 (2020–2021) ===
On January 21, 2020, Ellenson was acquired by the Raptors 905 in a sign-and-trade deal with the Long Island Nets.

On November 26, 2020, Ellenson signed a deal with the Toronto Raptors. On December 19, he was waived by the team.

On January 27, 2021, Ellenson was included in roster of Raptors 905.

=== Toronto Raptors (2021) ===
On March 10, 2021, the Toronto Raptors announced that they had signed Ellenson to a 10-day contract.

=== Monbus Obradoiro (2021–2022) ===
On July 13, 2021, Ellenson signed with Monbus Obradoiro of the Liga ACB.

=== Joventut Badalona (2022–2023) ===
On July 7, 2022, Ellenson signed with Joventut Badalona of the Liga ACB.

On July 4, 2023, Ellenson signed with Ibaraki Robots of the B.League. On September 19, he was placed on the injured list. On January 9, 2024, his contract was terminated, he didn't play any game.

=== Wisconsin Herd (2024–2025) ===
On October 15, 2024, Ellenson signed with the Milwaukee Bucks, but was waived two days later. On October 28, he joined the Wisconsin Herd.

== Career statistics ==
Legend
GP	Games played	GS	Games started	MPG	Minutes per game
FG%	Field goal percentage	3P%	3-point field goal percentage	FT%	Free throw percentage
RPG	Rebounds per game	APG	Assists per game	SPG	Steals per game
BPG	Blocks per game	PPG	Points per game	**Bold**	Career high

=== NBA ===
==== Regular season ====
Year	Team	GP	GS	MPG	FG%	3P%	FT%	RPG	APG	SPG	BPG	PPG
2016–17	Detroit	19	**2**	7.7	.359	.294	.500	2.2	.4	**.1**	**.1**	3.2
2017–18	Detroit	**38**	0	8.7	.363	.333	.862	2.1	.5	**.1**	.0	4.0
2018–19	Detroit	2	0	12.5	.400	**.500**	**1.000**	4.5	.5	.0	.0	6.0
2018–19	New York	17	0	13.8	**.412**	.441	.739	3.4	.9	**.4**	**.1**	6.0
2019–20	Brooklyn	5	0	3.0	.143	.000	—	1.2	.2	.0	.0	.4
2020–21	Toronto	2	0	**19.0**	.357	.222	.750	**6.0**	**2.5**	.0	.0	**7.5**
Career		83	2	9.5	.371	.336	.773	2.5	.6	.2	.0	4.1

=== College ===
Year	Team	GP	GS	MPG	FG%	3P%	FT%	RPG	APG	SPG	BPG	PPG
2015–16	Marquette	33	33	33.5	.446	.288	.749	9.7	1.8	.8	1.5	17.0

== Personal life ==
The son of John and Holly Ellenson, he has two brothers and one sister. His father played two seasons (1986–88) of basketball at Marquette and two seasons at Wisconsin while his brother, Wally, was a member of the men's basketball and track and field teams there.
