= Kadeem Allen =

American basketball player (born 1993)

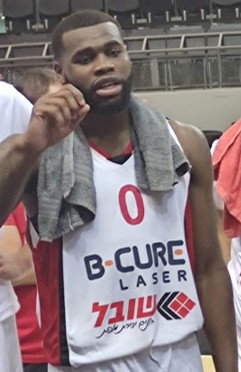

No. 0 – Juvi Cremona
- Position: Point guard
- League: Serie A2

Personal information
- Born: January 15, 1993 (age 33) Wilmington, North Carolina, U.S.
- Listed height: 6 ft 1 in (1.85 m)
- Listed weight: 200 lb (91 kg)

Career information
- High school: Emsley A. Laney (Wilmington, North Carolina); New Hanover (Wilmington, North Carolina)
- College: Hutchinson CC (2012–2014); Arizona (2015–2017)
- NBA draft: 2017: 2nd round, 53rd overall pick
- Drafted by: Boston Celtics
- Playing career: 2017–present

Career history
- 2017–2018: Boston Celtics
- 2017–2018: →Maine Red Claws
- 2018–2019: Westchester Knicks
- 2019–2020: New York Knicks
- 2019–2020: →Westchester Knicks
- 2020–2021: JL Bourg
- 2021–2023: Hapoel Haifa
- 2023: Calgary Surge
- 2023–2024: Pallacanestro Forlì 2.015
- 2024–2025: Pistoia Basket 2000
- 2025–present: Juvi Cremona

Career highlights
- NBA G League All-Defensive Team (2018); Second-team All-Pac-12 (2017); NABC Junior College Player of the Year (2014)
- Stats at NBA.com
- Stats at Basketball Reference

Kadeem Frank Allen (born January 15, 1993) is an American professional basketball player for Juvi Cremona of the Lega Serie A2. He played college basketball for Hutchinson Community College and Arizona.

== High school ==
In high school he first played for Laney High School, and in his senior year he played guard for New Hanover High School in his hometown of Wilmington, North Carolina.

== College career ==
Playing for Hutchinson Community College in Hutchinson, Kansas, Allen as a freshman averaged 17.3 points, 5.3 rebounds, 2.5 steals (tops in the Jayhawk Conference), and 3.9 assists (3rd) in 2012–13. As a sophomore he scored 25.9 points per game (second in the NJCAA), and had 5.9 assists and 2.3 steals per game. He was named Junior College Player of the Year in 2014 by both the NABC and NJCAA after being named the 2014 NJCAA Preseason Player of the Year by the Sporting News.

Hutchinson transferred to the University of Arizona and played for the Arizona Wildcats for his final two years. He averaged 9.8 points, 1.6 steals (4th in the Pac-12), and 4.0 rebounds per game in his senior campaign. As a senior, he was named second-team All-Pac-12 and to the All-Defensive team.

== Professional career ==
=== Boston Celtics (2017–2018) ===
Allen was drafted by the Celtics in the 2017 NBA draft and signed the franchise's first two-way contract. Under the terms of the deal, he will split time between the Celtics and their G League affiliate, the Maine Red Claws.

On January 29, 2018, Allen was named the NBA G League Player of the Week following a 38 points per game over the prior week. It included a 46 point game against the Long Island Nets on January 23.

On February 2, 2018, Allen and teammate Jabari Bird were named to the Midseason All-NBA G League East Team after averaging 18.0 points, 5.9 rebounds, 5.0 assists, and 2.6 steals per game.

On July 15, 2018, Allen was waived by the Celtics.

=== Westchester Knicks (2018–2019) ===
Allen was signed by the New York Knicks on July 25, 2018. He was waived by the Knicks on October 13, 2018, but signed with their G League affiliate the Westchester Knicks for training camp.

=== New York Knicks (2019–2020) ===
On January 14, 2019, Allen signed with the New York Knicks on a two-way contract. On June 25, 2020, the Knicks waived Allen.

=== JL Bourg (2020–2021) ===
On July 20, 2020, he signed with JL Bourg of LNB Pro A, with whom he averaged 9.6 points and 2.7 assists per game in EuroCup games 8.9 points and 2.5 assists per game in the domestic LNB league.

On January 25, 2021, Allen was included in the roster of the Canton Charge, but was later waived by the Charge on February 6, 2021.

=== Hapoel Haifa (2021–2023) ===
On June 19, 2021, Allen signed with Hapoel Haifa of the Israeli Basketball Premier League.

=== Calgary Surge (2023) ===
On June 9, 2023, Allen signed with the Calgary Surge of the Canadian Elite Basketball League. However, he was waived on July 5.

=== Juvi Cremona (2025–present) ===
On December 13, 2025, Allen signed with Juvi Cremona of the Lega Serie A2.

== Personal life ==
In 2016, Allen had a daughter.

== Career statistics ==
Legend
GP	Games played	GS	Games started	MPG	Minutes per game
FG%	Field goal percentage	3P%	3-point field goal percentage	FT%	Free throw percentage
RPG	Rebounds per game	APG	Assists per game	SPG	Steals per game
BPG	Blocks per game	PPG	Points per game	**Bold**	Career high

=== NBA ===
==== Regular season ====
Year	Team	GP	GS	MPG	FG%	3P%	FT%	RPG	APG	SPG	BPG	PPG
2017–18	Boston	18	**1**	5.9	.273	.000	**.778**	.6	.7	.2	.1	1.1
2018–19	New York	**19**	**1**	**21.9**	**.461**	**.472**	**.778**	**2.7**	**4.0**	**.8**	**.2**	**9.9**
2019–20	New York	10	0	11.7	.432	.313	.636	.9	2.1	.5	**.2**	5.0
Career		47	2	13.6	.435	.349	.757	1.5	2.3	.5	.2	5.5

=== College ===
Year	Team	GP	GS	MPG	FG%	3P%	FT%	RPG	APG	SPG	BPG	PPG
2015–16	Arizona	**34**	28	24.9	**.465**	.360	.705	3.1	**3.6**	1.0	**.8**	8.4
2016–17	Arizona	**34**	**33**	**30.0**	.453	**.427**	**.741**	**4.0**	3.0	**1.6**	.6	**9.8**
Career		68	61	27.5	.459	.400	.725	3.6	3.3	1.3	.7	9.1
