= Ray Spalding =

American basketball player (born 1997)

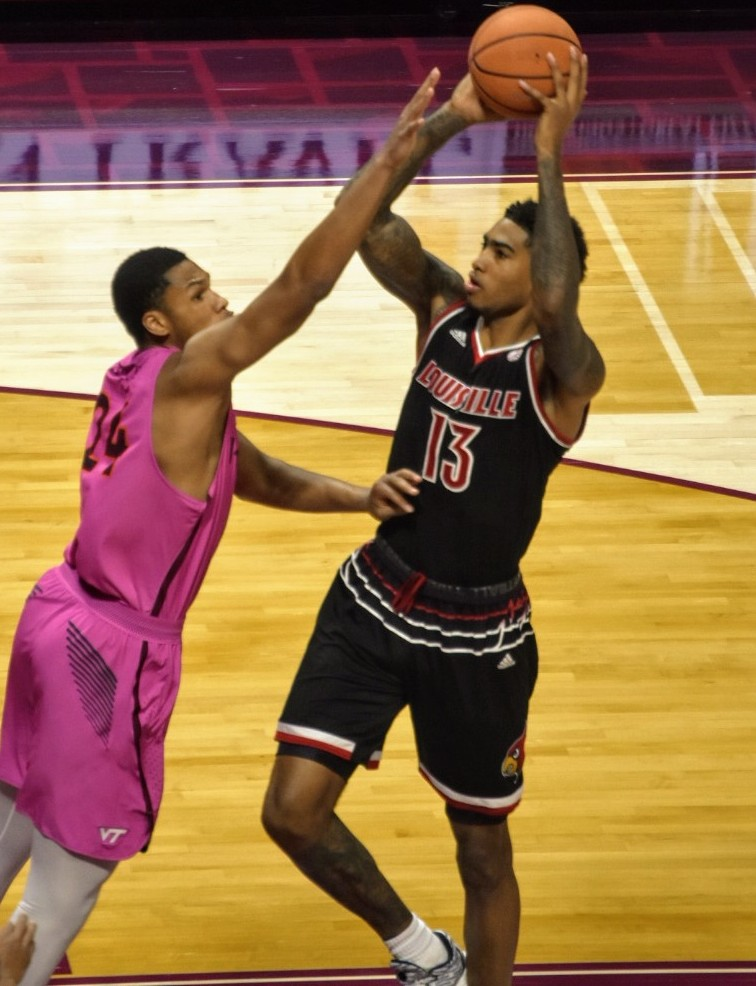
- Spalding (#13) shooting while at Louisville

No. 26 – Dorados de Chihuahua
- Position: Power forward
- League: LNBP

Personal information
- Born: March 11, 1997 (age 29) Louisville, Kentucky, U.S.
- Listed height: 6 ft 11 in (2.11 m)
- Listed weight: 250 lb (113 kg)

Career information
- High school: Trinity (Louisville, Kentucky)
- College: Louisville (2015–2018)
- NBA draft: 2018: 2nd round, 56th overall pick
- Drafted by: Philadelphia 76ers
- Playing career: 2018–present

Career history
- 2018–2019: Dallas Mavericks
- 2018–2019: →Texas Legends
- 2019: Phoenix Suns
- 2019–2020: Rio Grande Valley Vipers
- 2020: Charlotte Hornets
- 2020: →Greensboro Swarm
- 2021: Houston Rockets
- 2021: →Rio Grande Valley Vipers
- 2022–2024: Rio Grande Valley Vipers
- 2024: Osos de Manatí
- 2024–2025: Hapoel Be'er Sheva
- 2025–2026: Noblesville Boom
- 2026–present: Dorados de Chihuahua
- Stats at NBA.com
- Stats at Basketball Reference

Raymond Mark Spalding (born March 11, 1997) is an American professional basketball player for the Dorados de Chihuahua of the Liga Nacional de Baloncesto Profesional (LNBP). He played college basketball for the Louisville Cardinals, and was drafted by the Philadelphia 76ers in the second round of the 2018 NBA draft.

== High school career ==
Spalding is the son of Raymond Brooks and Gerri Spalding. He grew up playing lacrosse, soccer, kickball, table tennis, lacrosse, fencing and basketball. He attended Trinity High School in Louisville, Kentucky, where he was coached by Mike Szabo. Spalding began to receive college looks after scoring 34 points in an AAU tournament the summer before his senior year of high school. He committed to the Louisville Cardinals because he wanted to become a household name in his hometown.

== College career ==
Coming into Louisville, former head coach Rick Pitino raved about Spalding, claiming he has the most potential of any player he has coached. Spalding came off the bench his first two years at Louisville. He averaged 5.9 points and 5.7 rebounds per game as a sophomore. After the season, Spalding noticed the work teammate Donovan Mitchell put in to become an NBA player and resolved to do the same. He pulled down a career-high 16 rebounds to go with 21 points in a win versus Grand Canyon in December 2017. Spalding had a career-high 23 points to go with 12 rebounds in an 82–78 double-overtime win over Notre Dame on January 16, 2018. He moved into the starting lineup as a junior, averaging 12.3 points, 8.6 rebounds, 1.7 blocks and 1.5 steals per game. Spalding led the team to a 22–14 season and the quarterfinals of the NIT. He was an Honorable Mention All-Atlantic Coast Conference selection. After the season, Spalding entered the 2018 NBA draft and hired an agent, thus forgoing his final season at Louisville.

== Professional career ==
=== Dallas Mavericks (2018–2019) ===
On June 21, 2018, Spalding was drafted by the Philadelphia 76ers with the 56th pick in the 2018 NBA draft. He was subsequently traded to the Dallas Mavericks alongside the last pick of the draft, Kostas Antetokounmpo for the rights to the 54th pick, Shake Milton. He signed his rookie contract on July 20, 2018. He made his NBA debut on October 17, 2018, playing one minute, in a 121–100 loss against the Phoenix Suns. It was the only game he played with Dallas. The rest of his tenure was spent being assigned to the affiliate Texas Legends in the NBA G League.

On January 31, 2019, Spalding was dismissed by the Mavericks.

=== Phoenix Suns (2019) ===
On February 20, 2019, Spalding signed to a 10-day contract with the Phoenix Suns. While he never played during the proper contract, he was given a two-year partially guaranteed contract on March 3. Spalding eventually recorded his first rebound on March 9, playing in only 3 minutes in a 127–120 loss to the Portland Trail Blazers. A week later, Spalding would have his best game of the season in the NBA at that point against the New Orleans Pelicans, recording 8 points on 4-of-5 shooting, 4 rebounds, 2 blocks, and 2 assists in 14 minutes of action in a 138–136 overtime win. On April 5, Spalding had his first start in the league, putting up a double-double of 21 points and 13 rebounds in a 133–126 overtime win over the Pelicans.

=== Rio Grande Valley Vipers (2019–2020) ===
On July 31, 2019, Spalding signed an Exhibit 10 contract with the Atlanta Hawks. On October 8, 2019, he was waived by the Hawks. On October 10, 2019, Spalding signed with the Houston Rockets. He was waived by the Rockets on October 19, 2019. Following his release, he was added to the roster of the Rockets' G League affiliate, the Rio Grande Valley Vipers. Spalding was suspended one game without pay after leaving the bench during an altercation in a 132–109 loss to the Memphis Hustle on December 17.

=== Greensboro Swarm (2020) ===
On January 15, 2020, the Charlotte Hornets announced that they had signed with Spalding to a two-way contract. He scored 15 points in his G League debut for the Greensboro Swarm in a win over the Iowa Wolves. Spalding never played a game for the Hornets.

Spalding was waived by the Hornets on November 29, 2020.

=== Houston Rockets (2021) ===
On February 12, 2021, the Houston Rockets announced that they had signed with Spalding to a two-way contract. He was waived due to Achilles injury on February 16 after two games with the team.

=== Return to Rio Grande Valley (2022–2024) ===
On November 3, 2022, Spalding was named to the opening night roster for the Rio Grande Valley Vipers.

=== Osos de Manatí (2024–2025) ===
On April 16, 2024, Spalding signed with the Osos de Manatí of the Baloncesto Superior Nacional.

=== Noblesville Boom (2025–2026) ===
Prior to the 2025–26 NBA G League season, Spalding signed with the Noblesville Boom. On February 28, 2026, it was announced that Spalding would require season-ending surgery on his right middle finger.

== Career statistics ==
Legend
GP	Games played	GS	Games started	MPG	Minutes per game
FG%	Field goal percentage	3P%	3-point field goal percentage	FT%	Free throw percentage
RPG	Rebounds per game	APG	Assists per game	SPG	Steals per game
BPG	Blocks per game	PPG	Points per game	**Bold**	Career high

=== NBA ===
==== Regular season ====
Year	Team	GP	GS	MPG	FG%	3P%	FT%	RPG	APG	SPG	BPG	PPG
2018–19	Dallas	1	0	1.0	–	–	–	.0	.0	.0	.0	0.0
2018–19	Phoenix	**13**	**3**	**11.3**	**.532**	.000	**.333**	**3.7**	**.4**	**.7**	.6	**4.2**
2020–21	Houston	2	0	9.5	.500	.000	.000	2.0	.0	.0	**1.0**	2.0
Career		16	3	10.4	.529	.000	.286	3.3	.3	.6	.6	3.6

=== NBA G League ===
==== Regular season ====
Year	Team	GP	GS	MPG	FG%	3P%	FT%	RPG	APG	SPG	BPG	PPG
2018–19	Texas	29	26	30.1	.514	.231	.568	9.3	1.8	1.7	2.2	15.9
Career		29	26	30.1	.514	.231	.568	9.3	1.8	1.7	2.2	15.9

=== College ===
Year	Team	GP	GS	MPG	FG%	3P%	FT%	RPG	APG	SPG	BPG	PPG
2015–16	Louisville	30	6	17.5	.560	**.333**	.500	4.3	.5	.9	.7	5.6
2016–17	Louisville	34	8	19.2	**.590**	.000	.545	5.5	.8	.6	.9	5.9
2017–18	Louisville	**36**	**34**	**27.6**	.543	.263	**.640**	**8.7**	**1.3**	**1.5**	**1.7**	**12.3**
Career		100	48	21.7	.557	.240	.579	6.3	.9	1.0	1.1	8.1
