= 2018–19 Dallas Mavericks season =

NBA professional basketball team season

- Head coach: Rick Carlisle
- President: Donnie Nelson
- General manager: Donnie Nelson
- Owner: Mark Cuban
- Arena: American Airlines Center

Results
- Record: 33–49 (.402)
- Place: Division: 5th (Southwest); Conference: 14th (Western)
- Playoff finish: Did not qualify
- Stats at Basketball Reference

Local media
- Television: FS Southwest; KTXA
- Radio: KESN

The 2018–19 Dallas Mavericks season was the 39th season of the franchise in the National Basketball Association (NBA). With a 33-49 record, the team failed to make the playoffs for the third consecutive season. This was the last time that the Mavericks missed the playoffs until the 2022–23 season.

The 2019-19 season was Dirk Nowitzki's 21st and final season with the Mavericks. Nowitzki broke a record previously set by Kobe Bryant for the most seasons spent playing for a single NBA team, and he also became the fifth player in the NBA history to play in the league for 21 seasons. On March 18, 2019, he became the sixth-highest scoring player of all time, surpassing Wilt Chamberlain's total of 31,419 points.

The Mavericks' Luka Dončić won the Rookie of the Year Award for the 2018-19 season.

== Draft ==
Round	Pick	Player	Position	Nationality	College / club
1	5	Trae Young	PG	United States	Oklahoma
2	33	Jalen Brunson	PG	United States	Villanova
2	54	Shake Milton	SG	United States	SMU

Entering the night of the draft, the Mavericks originally held only the fifth, thirty-third, and fifty-fourth picks of the 2018 NBA draft. The last of their second-round picks was acquired from a three-way trade the previous season from the Denver Nuggets that also involved the New York Knicks. The Mavericks originally fell down a spot from fourth to fifth during the NBA Draft Lottery due to them originally missing out on the Top 3 selections, despite having the tiebreaker over the Atlanta Hawks for better odds there. This also resulted in them having the better second-round pick over the Hawks by comparison. Ironically, by the night of the draft, Dallas traded their original first-round pick in the draft (which became Oklahoma Sooners point guard Trae Young) and a protected 2019 first-round pick to Atlanta in exchange for the Hawks' own first-round pick, which became the Slovenian superstar guard/forward Luka Dončić. Dončić is a combo guard/small forward that grew to be a very major contributor for Real Madrid Baloncesto in the EuroLeague and Spain's national Liga ACB, winning championships and MVP awards throughout his professional tenure there, including being named the youngest ever EuroLeague Final Four MVP that year.

During the beginning of the second round, the Mavericks selected point guard Jalen Brunson from Villanova University. Brunson was a key contributor for two out of three years of NCAA Championships during his time at Villanova, with his second championship year (final college year overall) also naming him both the consensus National College Player of the Year and All-American First Team member. Finally, with their last (54th) pick, they traded that selection (which became Southern Methodist University point guard Shake Milton) to the Philadelphia 76ers in exchange for their last two second-round picks this year. With pick #57, the Mavericks received power forward Ray Spalding from Louisville University, while the very last selection of the 2018 NBA draft became combo forward Kostas Antetokounmpo, younger brother of superstar Giannis Antetokounmpo, from Dayton University. Antetokounmpo later signed a two-way contract to stay with the team on July 13, 2018.

== Roster ==
2018–19 Dallas Mavericks roster
Players

Pos.	No.	Player	Height	Weight	DOB	From
F	37	Kostas Antetokounmpo (TW)	6 ft 10 in (2.08 m)	200 lb (91 kg)	1997–11–20	Dayton
G	5	J. J. Barea (injured)	6 ft 0 in (1.83 m)	185 lb (84 kg)	1984–06–26	Northeastern
G/F	45	Ryan Broekhoff	6 ft 7 in (2.01 m)	215 lb (98 kg)	1990–08–23	Valparaiso
G	13	Jalen Brunson	6 ft 3 in (1.91 m)	190 lb (86 kg)	1996–08–31	Villanova
G	23	Trey Burke	6 ft 1 in (1.85 m)	175 lb (79 kg)	1992–11–12	Michigan
G	77	Luka Dončić	6 ft 8 in (2.03 m)	218 lb (99 kg)	1999–02–28	Slovenia
F	10	Dorian Finney-Smith	6 ft 8 in (2.03 m)	220 lb (100 kg)	1993–05–04	Florida
G	11	Tim Hardaway Jr.	6 ft 6 in (1.98 m)	205 lb (93 kg)	1992–03–16	Michigan
G	34	Devin Harris	6 ft 3 in (1.91 m)	185 lb (84 kg)	1983–02–27	Wisconsin
F	44	Justin Jackson	6 ft 8 in (2.03 m)	210 lb (95 kg)	1995–03–28	North Carolina
F	42	Maxi Kleber	6 ft 11 in (2.11 m)	240 lb (109 kg)	1992–01–29	Germany
G	1	Courtney Lee	6 ft 5 in (1.96 m)	215 lb (98 kg)	1985–10–03	Western Kentucky
G	3	Daryl Macon (TW)	6 ft 3 in (1.91 m)	185 lb (84 kg)	1995–11–29	Arkansas
C	50	Salah Mejri	7 ft 2 in (2.18 m)	235 lb (107 kg)	1986–06–15	Tunisia
C	41	Dirk Nowitzki	7 ft 0 in (2.13 m)	245 lb (111 kg)	1978-06-19	Germany
F/C	6	Kristaps Porziņģis (injured)	7 ft 3 in (2.21 m)	240 lb (109 kg)	1995–08–02	Latvia
F/C	7	Dwight Powell	6 ft 11 in (2.11 m)	240 lb (109 kg)	1991–07–20	Stanford

Coaches
Head coach
- Rick Carlisle
Assistant(s)
- Darrell Armstrong
- Jamahl Mosley
- Larry Shyatt
- Stephen Silas
- Mike Weinar

Legend
- (DP) Unsigned draft pick
- (FA) Free agent
- (S) Suspended
- (GL) On assignment to G League affiliate
- (TW) Two-way affiliate player
- Injured

Roster
Updated: 2019–04–10

== Standings ==
=== Division ===
Southwest Division	W	L	PCT	GB	Home	Road	Div	GP
y – Houston Rockets	53	29	.646	–	31‍–‍10	22‍–‍19	10–6	82
x – San Antonio Spurs	48	34	.585	5.0	32‍–‍9	16‍–‍25	10–6	82
Memphis Grizzlies	33	49	.402	20.0	21‍–‍20	12‍–‍29	8–8	82
New Orleans Pelicans	33	49	.402	20.0	19‍–‍22	14‍–‍27	8–8	82
Dallas Mavericks	33	49	.402	20.0	24‍–‍17	9‍–‍32	4–12	82

=== Conference ===
Western Conference
#	Team	W	L	PCT	GB	GP
1	c – Golden State Warriors *	57	25	.695	–	82
2	y – Denver Nuggets *	54	28	.659	3.0	82
3	x – Portland Trail Blazers	53	29	.646	4.0	82
4	y – Houston Rockets *	53	29	.646	4.0	82
5	x – Utah Jazz	50	32	.610	7.0	82
6	x – Oklahoma City Thunder	49	33	.598	8.0	82
7	x – San Antonio Spurs	48	34	.585	9.0	82
8	x – Los Angeles Clippers	48	34	.585	9.0	82
9	Sacramento Kings	39	43	.476	18.0	82
10	Los Angeles Lakers	37	45	.451	20.0	82
11	Minnesota Timberwolves	36	46	.439	21.0	82
12	Memphis Grizzlies	33	49	.402	24.0	82
13	New Orleans Pelicans	33	49	.402	24.0	82
14	Dallas Mavericks	33	49	.402	24.0	82
15	Phoenix Suns	19	63	.232	38.0	82

== Game log ==
=== Preseason ===
The preseason scheduled was announced on August 23, 2018.

2018 preseason game log
Total: 2–2 (Home: 1–1; Road: 1–1)
Preseason: 2–2 (home: 1–1; road: 1–1)

Game	Date	Team	Score	High points	High rebounds	High assists	Location Attendance	Record
1	September 29	Beijing	W 116–63	Dončić, Smith Jr. (16)	Jordan, Kleber (8)	Dennis Smith Jr. (6)	American Airlines Center; 18,325	1–0
2	October 5	@ Philadelphia	L 114–120	Dennis Smith Jr. (23)	Maxi Kleber (7)	J. J. Barea (9)	Mercedes-Benz Arena; 15,992	1–1
3	October 8	@ Philadelphia	W 115–112	Luka Dončić (15)	Maxi Kleber (7)	Dončić, Smith Jr. (16)	Shenzhen Universiade Sports Centre; 17,396	2–1
4	October 12	Charlotte	L 118–123	Dončić, Jordan (18)	DeAndre Jordan (12)	Wesley Matthews (5)	American Airlines Center; 18,745	2–2

2018–19 season schedule

=== Regular season ===
The schedule was announced on August 10, 2018.

2018–19 game log
Total: 33–49 (Home: 24–17; Road: 9–32)
October: 2–6 (home: 2–1; road: 0–5)

Game	Date	Team	Score	High points	High rebounds	High assists	Location Attendance	Record
1	October 17	@ Phoenix	L 100–121	Dwight Powell (16)	DeAndre Jordan (12)	J. J. Barea (10)	Talking Stick Resort Arena; 18,055	0–1
2	October 20	Minnesota	W 140–136	Luka Dončić (26)	DeAndre Jordan (10)	J. J. Barea (11)	American Airlines Center; 20,205	1–1
3	October 22	Chicago	W 115–109	Wesley Matthews (20)	DeAndre Jordan (16)	Luka Dončić (6)	American Airlines Center; 19,291	2–1
4	October 24	@ Atlanta	L 104–111	Wesley Matthews (23)	DeAndre Jordan (13)	J. J. Barea (9)	State Farm Arena; 16,705	2–2
5	October 26	@ Toronto	L 107–116	Luka Dončić (22)	DeAndre Jordan (15)	DeAndre Jordan (5)	Scotiabank Arena; 19,800	2–3
6	October 28	Utah	L 104–113	Dennis Smith Jr. (27)	DeAndre Jordan (19)	DeAndre Jordan (9)	American Airlines Center; 19,571	2–4
7	October 29	@ San Antonio	L 108–113 (OT)	Luka Dončić (31)	DeAndre Jordan (18)	Dončić, Smith Jr. (4)	AT&T Center; 18,354	2–5
8	October 31	@ LA Lakers	L 113–114	Wesley Matthews (21)	DeAndre Jordan (12)	J. J. Barea (10)	Staples Center; 18,997	2–6

November : 8–4 (home: 6–1; road: 2–3)

Game	Date	Team	Score	High points	High rebounds	High assists	Location Attendance	Record
9	November 2	New York	L 106–118	Dennis Smith Jr. (23)	DeAndre Jordan (10)	Barea, Dončić (6)	American Airlines Center; 20,008	2–7
10	November 6	Washington	W 119–100	Luka Dončić (23)	Harrison Barnes (13)	J. J. Barea (8)	American Airlines Center; 19,234	3–7
11	November 7	@ Utah	L 102–117	Luka Dončić (24)	DeAndre Jordan (12)	Wesley Matthews (4)	Vivint Smart Home Arena; 18,306	3–8
12	November 10	Oklahoma City	W 111–96	Luka Dončić (22)	DeAndre Jordan (9)	Luka Dončić (8)	American Airlines Center; 19,818	4–8
13	November 12	@ Chicago	W 103–98	Harrison Barnes (23)	DeAndre Jordan (16)	J. J. Barea (5)	United Center; 19,012	5–8
14	November 14	Utah	W 118–68	Harrison Barnes (19)	DeAndre Jordan (10)	J. J. Barea (5)	American Airlines Center; 19,371	6–8
15	November 17	Golden State	W 112–109	Luka Dončić (24)	DeAndre Jordan (10)	Dennis Smith Jr. (6)	American Airlines Center; 20,260	7–8
16	November 19	@ Memphis	L 88–98	Dennis Smith Jr. (19)	DeAndre Jordan (20)	Dennis Smith Jr. (5)	FedExForum; 15,997	7–9
17	November 21	Brooklyn	W 119–113	Harrison Barnes (28)	DeAndre Jordan (14)	J. J. Barea (7)	American Airlines Center; 19,926	8–9
18	November 24	Boston	W 113–104	Barea, Barnes (20)	DeAndre Jordan (13)	Barea, Dončić (8)	American Airlines Center; 20,226	9–9
19	November 28	@ Houston	W 128–108	Dončić, Harris (20)	DeAndre Jordan (7)	J. J. Barea (12)	Toyota Center; 18,055	10–9
20	November 30	@ LA Lakers	L 103–114	Harrison Barnes (29)	DeAndre Jordan (12)	Luka Dončić (5)	Staples Center; 18,997	10–10

December : 7–9 (home: 7–1; road: 0–8)

Game	Date	Team	Score	High points	High rebounds	High assists	Location Attendance	Record
21	December 2	LA Clippers	W 114–110	Harrison Barnes (30)	DeAndre Jordan (23)	Dennis Smith Jr. (5)	American Airlines Center; 19,551	11–10
22	December 4	Portland	W 111–102	Luka Dončić (21)	DeAndre Jordan (17)	Dennis Smith Jr. (9)	American Airlines Center; 19,341	12–10
23	December 5	@ New Orleans	L 106–132	Harrison Barnes (16)	Dwight Powell (10)	Jalen Brunson (7)	Smoothie King Center; 14,810	12–11
24	December 8	Houston	W 107–104	Dončić, Matthews (21)	DeAndre Jordan (20)	J. J. Barea (4)	American Airlines Center; 20,254	13–11
25	December 10	Orlando	W 101–76	Harrison Barnes (19)	Luka Dončić (11)	Luka Dončić (9)	American Airlines Center; 19,334	14–11
26	December 12	Atlanta	W 114–107	Harrison Barnes (25)	DeAndre Jordan (11)	Luka Dončić (6)	American Airlines Center; 19,643	15–11
27	December 13	@ Phoenix	L 89–99	Harrison Barnes (15)	DeAndre Jordan (15)	Luka Dončić (6)	Talking Stick Resort Arena; 13,265	15–12
28	December 16	Sacramento	L 113–120	Luka Dončić (28)	DeAndre Jordan (23)	Luka Dončić (9)	American Airlines Center; 19,935	15–13
29	December 18	@ Denver	L 118–126	Harrison Barnes (30)	DeAndre Jordan (12)	Luka Dončić (12)	Pepsi Center; 15,764	15–14
30	December 20	@ LA Clippers	L 121–125	Luka Dončić (32)	DeAndre Jordan (22)	J. J. Barea (8)	Staples Center; 17,528	15–15
31	December 22	@ Golden State	L 116–120	Wesley Matthews (25)	DeAndre Jordan (23)	J. J. Barea (6)	Oracle Arena; 19,596	15–16
32	December 23	@ Portland	L 118–121 (OT)	Harrison Barnes (27)	Luka Dončić (11)	J. J. Barea (8)	Moda Center; 19,707	15–17
33	December 26	New Orleans	W 122–119	Luka Dončić (21)	DeAndre Jordan (12)	Luka Dončić (10)	American Airlines Center; 20,340	16–17
34	December 28	@ New Orleans	L 112–114	Luka Dončić (34)	DeAndre Jordan (15)	three players (4)	Smoothie King Center; 18,364	16–18
35	December 30	Oklahoma City	W 105–103	Luka Dončić (25)	DeAndre Jordan (17)	J. J. Barea (10)	American Airlines Center; 20,380	17–18
36	December 31	@ Oklahoma City	L 102–122	Harrison Barnes (25)	DeAndre Jordan (10)	Dončić, Smith Jr. (3)	Chesapeake Energy Arena; 18,203	17–19

January : 6–9 (home: 3–4; road: 3–5)

Game	Date	Team	Score	High points	High rebounds	High assists	Location Attendance	Record
37	January 2	@ Charlotte	W 122–84	Dončić, Smith Jr. (18)	DeAndre Jordan (13)	Dennis Smith Jr. (7)	Spectrum Center; 16,955	18–19
38	January 4	@ Boston	L 93–114	Harrison Barnes (20)	DeAndre Jordan (15)	Luka Dončić (4)	TD Garden; 18,624	18–20
39	January 5	@ Philadelphia	L 100–106	Wesley Matthews (18)	Jalen Brunson (11)	Jalen Brunson (8)	Wells Fargo Center; 20,656	18–21
40	January 7	LA Lakers	L 97–107	Luka Dončić (27)	DeAndre Jordan (19)	J. J. Barea (3)	American Airlines Center; 20,354	18–22
41	January 9	Phoenix	W 104–94	Luka Dončić (30)	Maxi Kleber (9)	Dončić, Matthews (5)	American Airlines Center; 19,596	19–22
42	January 11	@ Minnesota	W 119–115	Luka Dončić (29)	DeAndre Jordan (15)	Luka Dončić (12)	Target Center; 18,978	20–22
43	January 13	Golden State	L 114–119	Luka Dončić (26)	DeAndre Jordan (14)	Dončić, Matthews (5)	American Airlines Center; 20,340	20–23
44	January 16	San Antonio	L 101–105	Luka Dončić (25)	DeAndre Jordan (9)	Luka Dončić (8)	American Airlines Center; 20,214	20–24
45	January 19	@ Indiana	L 99–111	Harrison Barnes (20)	DeAndre Jordan (16)	Luka Dončić (6)	Bankers Life Fieldhouse; 17,508	20–25
46	January 21	@ Milwaukee	L 106–116	Luka Dončić (18)	DeAndre Jordan (15)	Luka Dončić (10)	Fiserv Forum; 17,963	20–26
47	January 22	LA Clippers	W 106–98	Harrison Barnes (20)	DeAndre Jordan (16)	Luka Dončić (6)	American Airlines Center; 19,466	21–26
48	January 25	Detroit	W 106–101	Luka Dončić (32)	DeAndre Jordan (11)	Luka Dončić (8)	American Airlines Center; 20,327	22–26
49	January 27	Toronto	L 120–123	Luka Dončić (35)	Luka Dončić (12)	Luka Dončić (10)	American Airlines Center; 20,308	22–27
50	January 30	@ New York	W 114–90	Harrison Barnes (20)	Dennis Smith Jr. (10)	Dennis Smith Jr. (15)	Madison Square Garden; 18,842	23–27
51	January 31	@ Detroit	L 89–93	Harrison Barnes (27)	Maxi Kleber (8)	Jalen Brunson (6)	Little Caesars Arena; 14,075	23–28

February : 4–6 (home: 3–3; road: 1–3)

Game	Date	Team	Score	High points	High rebounds	High assists	Location Attendance	Record
52	February 2	@ Cleveland	W 111–98	Luka Dončić (35)	Luka Dončić (11)	Luka Dončić (6)	Quicken Loans Arena; 19,432	24–28
53	February 6	Charlotte	W 99–93	Luka Dončić (19)	Dwight Powell (12)	Luka Dončić (11)	American Airlines Center; 19,606	25–28
54	February 8	Milwaukee	L 107–122	Luka Dončić (20)	Dwight Powell (8)	Trey Burke (5)	American Airlines Center; 20,420	25–29
55	February 10	Portland	W 102–101	Luka Dončić (28)	Luka Dončić (9)	Jalen Brunson (7)	American Airlines Center; 20,340	26–29
56	February 11	@ Houston	L 104–120	Luka Dončić (21)	Luka Dončić (10)	Luka Dončić (8)	Toyota Center; 18,055	26–30
57	February 13	Miami	L 101–112	Tim Hardaway Jr. (20)	Luka Dončić (12)	Luka Dončić (9)	American Airlines Center; 20,364	26–31
58	February 22	Denver	L 104–114	Jalen Brunson (22)	Dorian Finney-Smith (9)	Harris, Brunson (5)	American Airlines Center; 20,382	26–32
59	February 23	@ Utah	L 109–125	Tim Hardaway Jr. (21)	Trey Burke (7)	Tim Hardaway Jr. (4)	Vivint Smart Home Arena; 18,306	26–33
60	February 25	@ LA Clippers	L 112–121	Luka Dončić (28)	Dončić, Finney-Smith (10)	Luka Dončić (10)	Staples Center; 19,068	26–34
61	February 27	Indiana	W 110–101	Luka Dončić (26)	Luka Dončić (10)	Luka Dončić (7)	American Airlines Center; 19,978	27–34

March : 3–12 (home: 1–5; road: 2–7)

Game	Date	Team	Score	High points	High rebounds	High assists	Location Attendance	Record
62	March 2	Memphis	L 81–111	Luka Dončić (22)	Dwight Powell (8)	Dwight Powell (4)	American Airlines Center; 20,233	27–35
63	March 4	@ Brooklyn	L 88–127	Dwight Powell (20)	Dončić, Powell (6)	Luka Dončić (6)	Barclays Center; 17,064	27–36
64	March 6	@ Washington	L 123–132	Luka Dončić (31)	Luka Dončić (11)	Jalen Brunson (8)	Capital One Arena; 16,867	27–37
65	March 8	@ Orlando	L 106–111	Luka Dončić (24)	Luka Dončić (8)	Jalen Brunson (9)	Amway Center; 19,196	27–38
66	March 10	Houston	L 93–94	Luka Dončić (19)	Luka Dončić (15)	Luka Dončić (9)	American Airlines Center; 20,423	27–39
67	March 12	San Antonio	L 105–112	Jalen Brunson (34)	Finney-Smith, Powell (6)	Luka Dončić (7)	American Airlines Center; 20,366	27–40
68	March 14	@ Denver	L 99–100	Luka Dončić (24)	Dončić, Kleber (11)	Luka Dončić (9)	Pepsi Center; 19,520	27–41
69	March 16	Cleveland	W 121–116	Tim Hardaway Jr. (22)	Maxi Kleber (12)	Jalen Brunson (7)	American Airlines Center; 20,347	28–41
70	March 18	New Orleans	L 125–129 (OT)	Luka Dončić (29)	Luka Dončić (13)	Luka Dončić (10)	American Airlines Center; 20,276	28–42
71	March 20	@ Portland	L 118–126	Luka Dončić (24)	Dwight Powell (9)	Luka Dončić (6)	Moda Center; 19,803	28–43
72	March 21	@ Sacramento	L 100–116	Justin Jackson (19)	Luka Dončić (10)	Dwight Powell (5)	Golden 1 Center; 17,583	28–44
73	March 23	@ Golden State	W 126–91	Luka Dončić (23)	Luka Dončić (11)	Luka Dončić (10)	Oracle Arena; 19,596	29–44
74	March 26	Sacramento	L 121–125	Luka Dončić (28)	Dwight Powell (13)	Luka Dončić (12)	American Airlines Center; 20,168	29–45
75	March 28	@ Miami	L 99–105	Luka Dončić (19)	Maxi Kleber (10)	Luka Dončić (7)	American Airlines Arena; 19,851	29–46
76	March 31	@ Oklahoma City	W 106–103	Trey Burke (25)	Dirk Nowitzki (13)	Trey Burke (8)	Chesapeake Energy Arena; 18,203	30–46

April : 3–3 (home: 2–2; road: 1–1)

Game	Date	Team	Score	High points	High rebounds	High assists	Location Attendance	Record
77	April 1	Philadelphia	W 122–102	Justin Jackson (24)	Salah Mejri (14)	Jalen Brunson (7)	American Airlines Center; 19,645	31–46
78	April 3	Minnesota	L 108–110	Luka Dončić (27)	Luka Dončić (12)	Luka Dončić (6)	American Airlines Center; 19,576	31–47
79	April 5	Memphis	L 112–122	Courtney Lee (21)	Dirk Nowitzki (7)	Courtney Lee (7)	American Airlines Center; 20,111	31–48
80	April 7	@ Memphis	W 129–127 (OT)	Trey Burke (24)	Dorian Finney-Smith (12)	Jalen Brunson (10)	FedExForum; 16,744	32–48
81	April 9	Phoenix	W 120–109	Dirk Nowitzki (30)	Luka Dončić (11)	Luka Dončić (11)	American Airlines Center; 21,041	33–48
82	April 10	@ San Antonio	L 94–105	Dirk Nowitzki (20)	Dwight Powell (16)	Jalen Brunson (10)	AT&T Center; 18.629	33–49

2018–19 season schedule

== Player statistics ==
=== Regular season ===
Player	POS	GP	GS	MP	REB	AST	STL	BLK	PTS	MPG	RPG	APG	SPG	BPG	PPG
Dorian Finney-Smith	SF	81	26	1,985	389	95	69	36	608	24.5	4.8	1.2	.9	.4	7.5
Dwight Powell	C	77	22	1,662	411	112	44	50	815	21.6	5.3	1.5	.6	.6	10.6
Jalen Brunson	PG	73	38	1,591	169	230	37	4	678	21.8	2.3	3.2	.5	.1	9.3
Luka Dončić	SG	72	72	2,318	563	429	77	25	1,526	32.2	7.8	6.0	1.1	.3	21.2
Maxi Kleber	PF	71	18	1,502	329	70	36	78	485	21.2	4.6	1.0	.5	1.1	6.8
Devin Harris	PG	68	2	1,071	112	122	35	16	428	15.8	1.6	1.8	.5	.2	6.3
Dirk Nowitzki	PF	51	20	795	158	35	9	18	373	15.6	3.1	.7	.2	.4	7.3
DeAndre Jordan^{†}	C	50	50	1,554	686	99	33	53	551	31.1	13.7	2.0	.7	1.1	11.0
Harrison Barnes^{†}	PF	49	49	1,584	207	62	33	11	866	32.3	4.2	1.3	.7	.2	17.7
Wesley Matthews^{†}	SF	44	44	1,312	102	100	33	12	575	29.8	2.3	2.3	.8	.3	13.1
Ryan Broekhoff	SG	42	0	453	63	22	6	4	167	10.8	1.5	.5	.1	.1	4.0
J. J. Barea	PG	38	0	752	95	211	22	1	415	19.8	2.5	5.6	.6	.0	10.9
Salah Mejri	C	36	4	399	131	35	10	26	141	11.1	3.6	1.0	.3	.7	3.9
Dennis Smith Jr.^{†}	PG	32	32	908	97	138	40	11	414	28.4	3.0	4.3	1.3	.3	12.9
Justin Jackson^{†}	SF	29	11	531	66	28	9	1	237	18.3	2.3	1.0	.3	.0	8.2
Trey Burke^{†}	PG	25	1	436	37	65	12	2	243	17.4	1.5	2.6	.5	.1	9.7
Courtney Lee^{†}	SG	22	4	268	27	21	13	1	80	12.2	1.2	1.0	.6	.0	3.6
Tim Hardaway Jr.^{†}	SG	19	17	558	61	37	12	2	294	29.4	3.2	1.9	.6	.1	15.5
Daryl Macon	SG	8	0	90	12	7	1	0	29	11.3	1.5	.9	.1	.0	3.6
Kostas Antetokounmpo	PF	2	0	11	1	0	2	0	2	5.5	.5	.0	1.0	.0	1.0
Ray Spalding^{†}	PF	1	0	1	0	0	0	0	0	1.0	.0	.0	.0	.0	.0

- ^{†} Denotes player spent time with another team in the season. Stats reflect time with the Mavericks only.

== Awards ==
Player	Award	Awarded
Luka Dončić	Rookie of the Month	October/November; December; January; February; March/April
Luka Dončić	Rookie of the Year	
Dirk Nowitzki	All-Star	

== Transactions ==
=== Trades ===
June 21, 2018	To Dallas Mavericks Draft rights to Luka Dončić	To Atlanta Hawks Draft rights to Trae Young; 2019 protected first-round draft pick
June 21, 2018	To Dallas Mavericks Draft rights to Ray Spalding; Draft rights to Kostas Antetokounmpo	To Philadelphia 76ers Draft rights to Shake Milton
July 23, 2018	To Dallas Mavericks Draft rights to Maarty Leunen; Cash considerations	To Los Angeles Clippers Johnathan Motley; Draft rights to Renaldas Seibutis
August 2, 2018	To Dallas Mavericks Chinanu Onuaku; Cash considerations Option to swap 2020 second-round draft picks	To Houston Rockets Draft rights to Maarty Leunen
January 31, 2019	To Dallas Mavericks Kristaps Porziņģis; Tim Hardaway Jr. Courtney Lee; Trey Burke	To New York Knicks Dennis Smith Jr. DeAndre Jordan; Wesley Matthews; 2021 unprotected and 2023 protected first-round draft picks
February 6, 2019	To Dallas Mavericks Zach Randolph; Justin Jackson	To Sacramento Kings Harrison Barnes

=== Free agents ===
==== Re-signed ====
Player	Signed
Dirk Nowitzki	July 23, 2018
Salah Mejri	August 3, 2018

==== Additions ====
Player	Signed	Former team
DeAndre Jordan	July 6, 2018	Los Angeles Clippers
Kostas Antetokounmpo	July 13, 2018 (two-way contract)	Dayton Flyers
Ding Yanyuhang	July 23, 2018	(China) Shandong Golden Stars
Daryl Macon	July 30, 2018 (two-way contract)	Arkansas Razorbacks
Terry Larrier	July 31, 2018	Connecticut Huskies
Salah Mejri	February 10, 2019	Dallas Mavericks
Codi Miller-McIntyre	August 1, 2018	(Russia) Parma Basket
Ryan Broekhoff	August 6, 2018	(Russia) Lokomotiv Kuban
Devin Harris	August 8, 2018	Denver Nuggets
Donte Ingram	October 8, 2018	Loyola Ramblers
Rashad Vaughn	October 8, 2018	Orlando Magic

==== Subtractions ====
Player	Reason left	New team
Kyle Collinsworth	Waived	Toronto Raptors
Seth Curry	Signed 2-year, $2.75 million contract	Portland Trail Blazers
Ding Yanyuhang	Waived	Texas Legends
Yogi Ferrell	Signed 2-year, $6.2 million contract	Sacramento Kings
Donte Ingram	Waived	Texas Legends
Jalen Jones	Waived	Cleveland Cavaliers
Terry Larrier	Waived	
Doug McDermott	Signed 3-year, $22 million contract	Indiana Pacers
Salah Mejri	Waived	Dallas Mavericks
Codi Miller-McIntyre	Waived	(Russia) Zenit Saint Petersburg
Nerlens Noel	Signed 2-year minimum contract	Oklahoma City Thunder
Chinanu Onuaku	Waived	Portland Trail Blazers
Zach Randolph	Waived	
Ray Spalding	Waived	Phoenix Suns
Rashad Vaughn	Waived	Texas Legends
Jeff Withey	Unrestricted free agent	(Turkey) Tofaş
