= Jawun Evans =

American basketball player (born 1996)

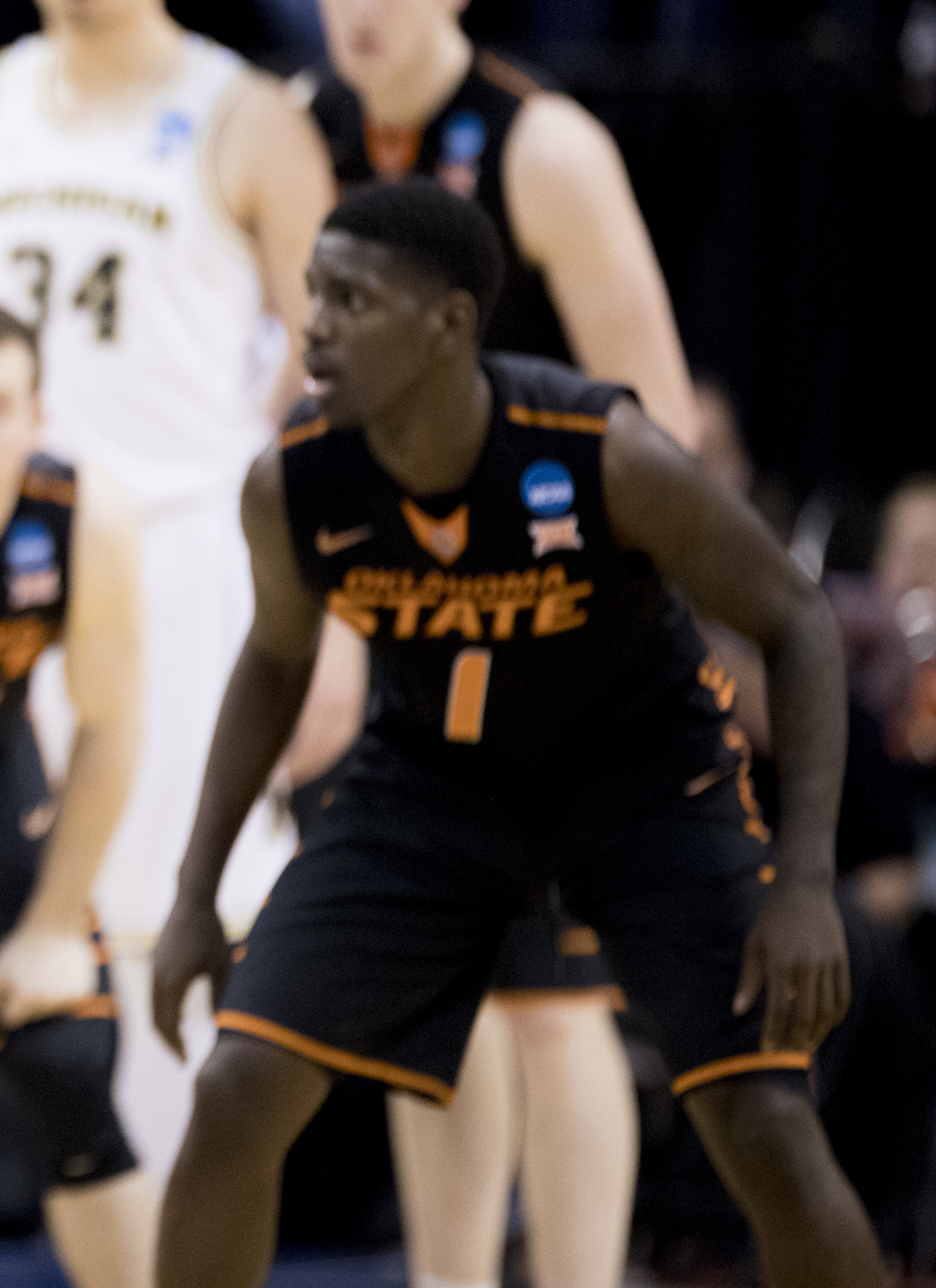
- Evans with Oklahoma State in 2017

No. 6 – Pioneros de Los Mochis
- Position: Point guard
- League: CIBACOPA

Personal information
- Born: July 26, 1996 (age 29) Greenville, South Carolina, U.S.
- Listed height: 6 ft 0 in (1.83 m)
- Listed weight: 190 lb (86 kg)

Career information
- High school: Southside (Greenville, South Carolina); Legacy Early College (Greenville, South Carolina); Kimball (Dallas, Texas)
- College: Oklahoma State (2015–2017)
- NBA draft: 2017: 2nd round, 39th overall pick
- Drafted by: Philadelphia 76ers
- Playing career: 2017–present

Career history
- 2017–2018: Los Angeles Clippers
- 2017: →Agua Caliente Clippers
- 2018: Northern Arizona Suns
- 2018–2019: Phoenix Suns
- 2018–2019: →Northern Arizona Suns
- 2019: Oklahoma City Thunder
- 2019: →Oklahoma City Blue
- 2019–2020: Raptors 905
- 2021: Promitheas Patras
- 2021–2022: Raptors 905
- 2022: Cleveland Charge
- 2022–2023: Juventus Utena
- 2023: Maccabi Rishon LeZion
- 2023: Śląsk Wrocław
- 2024: JDA Dijon Basket
- 2024–2025: Legia Warsaw
- 2025: Maine Celtics
- 2025–2026: Anhui Wenyi
- 2026–present: Pioneros de Los Mochis

Career highlights
- Third-team All-American – SN (2017); First-team All-Big 12 (2017); Big 12 Freshman of the Year (2016); McDonald's All-American (2015); First-team Parade All-American (2015)
- Stats at NBA.com
- Stats at Basketball Reference
Medals
Men's basketball
Representing the United States
World U19 Championship
Gold medal – first place	2015 Greece	National team

Jawun B. Evans (born July 26, 1996) is an American professional basketball player for the Pioneros de Los Mochis of the CIBACOPA. A point guard, he played college basketball for Oklahoma State, Evans was named an All-American in the 2016–17 season.

== High school career ==
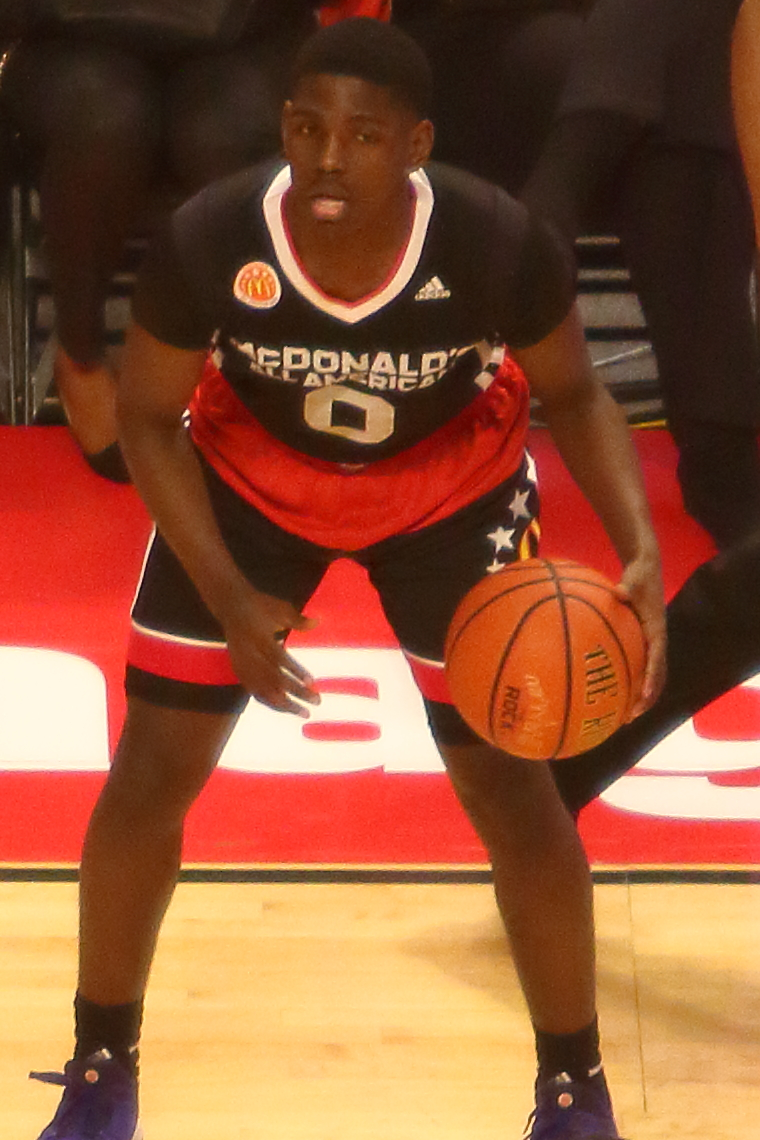
Evans at the 2015 McDonald's All-American Boys Game

Jawun Evans attended Southside High School in Greenville, South Carolina. As a freshman, scored 26 points to lead Southside High School over Wade Hampton in the 2012 Upper State championship game. Southside finished with an 18–10 record and a runner-up finish in the South Carolina Class 3A state championship game. He transferred to Legacy Early College in Greenville, South Carolina for his sophomore year (2012–13) while playing under his Southside Coach, B.J. Jackson. He dominated and played against some of that year's top talent programs. He later moved to Texas.

After moving from South Carolina to Dallas, Texas, Evans starred at Justin F. Kimball High School in his Junior and Senior year, where he was named to the Parade All-America team and the McDonald's All-American Game in 2015. He chose Oklahoma State over Illinois, USC and Texas, among others. In the Summer before his freshman year at Oklahoma State, Evans played for the United States in the FIBA Under-19 World Championship in Greece, where Team USA won the championship by defeating Croatia in overtime.

== College career ==
As a freshman, Evans averaged 12.9 points, 4.9 assists and 4.4 rebounds per game. He scored a Cowboys freshman record 42 points against arch-rival Oklahoma and at the close of the season was named the Big 12 Conference Freshman of the Year, despite missing more than a month of the season after injuring his shoulder in a February 3, 2016 game. Returning his sophomore season, Evans was named preseason All-Big 12. At the close of the regular season, he was named first-team all-conference and a third-team All-American by Sporting News magazine.

== Professional career ==
=== Los Angeles Clippers (2017–2018) ===
On June 22, 2017, Evans was drafted by the Philadelphia 76ers with the 39th selection in the 2017 NBA draft. On July 6, 2017, he was traded to the Los Angeles Clippers in exchange for cash considerations.

On October 15, 2018, Evans was waived by the Los Angeles Clippers.

=== Phoenix / Northern Arizona Suns (2018–2019) ===
Evans signed with the Northern Arizona Suns of the NBA G League on November 4, 2018. and on December 7, he was signed by the Phoenix Suns to a two-way contract. However, he was waived on March 23, 2019.

=== Oklahoma City Thunder (2019) ===
On March 25, 2019, Evans was claimed off waivers by the Oklahoma City Thunder.

=== Raptors 905 (2019–2020) ===
Evans was on the opening night roster of the Raptors 905 in 2019. He averaged 8 points, 4 assists, and 5 rebounds per game but suffered a major injury. On March 6, 2020, he was waived after it was determined his injury was season-ending.

=== Promitheas Patras (2021) ===
On January 16, 2021, Evans signed with Promitheas Patras of the Greek Basket League.

=== Return to Raptors 905 (2021–2022) ===
Evans rejoined the Raptors 905 in October 2021.

=== Cleveland Charge (2022) ===
On January 6, 2022, Evans was traded to the Cleveland Charge of the NBA G League.

=== Juventus Utena (2022) ===
On September 6, 2022, Evans signed a one-year deal with Juventus Utena of the Lithuanian Basketball League (LKL).

=== Śląsk Wrocław (2023) ===
On July 28, 2023, he signed with Śląsk Wrocław of the PLK.

=== JDA Dijon Basket (2024) ===
In March, 2024, he signed a short-term deal with JDA Dijon Basket.

=== Legia Warsaw (2024–2025) ===
On August 10, 2024, Evans signed a contract with Legia Warsaw of the Polish Basketball League (PLK).

=== Maine Celtics (2025) ===
On January 24, 2025, Evans joined the Maine Celtics.

== Career statistics ==
Legend
GP	Games played	GS	Games started	MPG	Minutes per game
FG%	Field goal percentage	3P%	3-point field goal percentage	FT%	Free throw percentage
RPG	Rebounds per game	APG	Assists per game	SPG	Steals per game
BPG	Blocks per game	PPG	Points per game	**Bold**	Career high

=== NBA ===
==== Regular season ====
Year	Team	GP	GS	MPG	FG%	3P%	FT%	RPG	APG	SPG	BPG	PPG
2017–18	L.A. Clippers	**48**	**4**	**16.2**	**.352**	**.278**	**.776**	**1.8**	**2.1**	**.8**	**.1**	**4.8**
2018–19	Phoenix	7	0	9.1	.231	.000	–	1.7	1.4	.4	.0	.9
2018–19	Oklahoma City	1	0	1.0	.000	.000	–	.0	.0	.0	.0	.0
Career		56	4	15.1	.345	.263	.776	1.7	2.0	.7	.1	4.2

=== NBA G League ===
==== Regular season ====
Year	Team	GP	GS	MPG	FG%	3P%	FT%	RPG	APG	SPG	BPG	PPG
2017–18	Agua Caliente	1	1	27.9	.182	.000	–	4.0	4.0	1.0	.0	4.0
Career		1	1	27.9	.182	.000	–	4.0	4.0	1.0	.0	4.0

=== College ===
Year	Team	GP	GS	MPG	FG%	3P%	FT%	RPG	APG	SPG	BPG	PPG
2015–16	Oklahoma State	22	20	28.9	**.471**	**.475**	**.833**	**4.4**	4.9	1.1	**.2**	12.9
2016–17	Oklahoma State	**32**	**32**	**29.3**	.438	.379	.812	3.4	**6.4**	**1.8**	.1	**19.2**
Career		54	52	29.1	.448	.407	.818	3.8	5.8	1.5	.1	16.6
