= 2018–19 Phoenix Suns season =

NBA team season

- Head coach: Igor Kokoškov
- General manager: Ryan McDonough (until Oct. 8); James Jones/Trevor Bukstein (interims)
- Owners: Robert Sarver
- Arena: Talking Stick Resort Arena

Results
- Record: 19–63 (.232)
- Place: Division: 5th (Pacific); Conference: 15th (Western)
- Playoff finish: Did not qualify
- Stats at Basketball Reference

Local media
- Television: Fox Sports Arizona
- Radio: KTAR

The 2018–19 Phoenix Suns season was the 51st season of the franchise in the National Basketball Association (NBA), as well as their 26th season at the Talking Stick Resort Arena. They finished with 19 wins to 63 losses, the franchise's worst regular season record since the inaugural season 1968–69.

The Suns started the season with a new head coach, signing former assistant coach Igor Kokoškov to a three-year deal on May 2, 2018. After winning the first overall pick in the 2018 NBA draft, the Suns picked Deandre Ayton, a Bahamian center from the University of Arizona. They also gained the draft rights of the tenth overall pick, Mikal Bridges, through a trade involving the Philadelphia 76ers, thus recovering the final pick they received from first trading Steve Nash to the Los Angeles Lakers back in 2012. During the 2018 NBA free agency period, the Suns also acquired some key players from the Houston Rockets the previous season with Trevor Ariza on July 1 and Ryan Anderson and rookie De'Anthony Melton nearly two months later on August 31. But after failing to sign a starting-caliber point guard during free agency, general manager Ryan McDonough was fired before the regular season began on October 8. He was replaced by former Suns' player James Jones and Trevor Bukstein on an interim basis throughout the entire season; Jones was eventually named the permanent general manager after the end of this season, with Bukstein returning to his initial assistant general manager role going forward.

The Suns were the first team eliminated from playoff contention on February 23, missing the playoffs for the ninth straight season.

== Key dates ==
- April 13, 2018: The NBA used a coin flip to decide whether the Suns get both Miami and Milwaukee's first-round picks this year or just Miami's first-round pick; Miami's selection ultimately became the 16th overall pick instead of Milwaukee's pick.
- May 2, 2018: Igor Kokoškov was confirmed to sign a three-year deal with the Suns as their next head coach.
- May 15, 2018: The NBA draft lottery took place, the last year of the original weighted lottery was in effect; Phoenix, for the first time in franchise history, won the first overall pick in the NBA draft lottery.
- June 21, 2018: The 2018 NBA draft took place at the Barclays Center in Brooklyn, New York; Deandre Ayton from the nearby University of Arizona was the franchise's first #1 pick, while the Suns also traded small forward Zhaire Smith and the Miami Heat's 2021 first round pick to the Philadelphia 76ers for two-time NCAA Champion small forward Mikal Bridges, the tenth pick in the first round. They also drafted the French point guard Élie Okobo and Colorado shooting guard George King in the second round.
- June 30, 2018: The Suns waived Tyler Ulis the day before his $1.5 million contract would have been guaranteed.
- July 1, 2018: The NBA free agency period began; Trevor Ariza agrees to a one-year deal worth $15,000,000.
- July 2, 2018: The Suns waived center Alan Williams and renounced their free agency rights to two-way contracts Alec Peters and Danuel House.
- July 6, 2018: The July moratorium ended for free agents to begin signing contracts with new teams.
- July 7, 2018: Shooting guard Devin Booker received a five-year maximum contract extension with the Suns.
- July 20, 2018: The Suns retained both guards Davon Reed and Shaquille Harrison after their 2018 NBA Summer League performances; Phoenix also made two trades: Jared Dudley (and a top-35 protected 2021 second-round pick) to the Brooklyn Nets in exchange for Darrell Arthur, and $1,000,000 in cash considerations to the Philadelphia 76ers for power forward/center Richaun Holmes.
- August 10, 2018: The NBA revealed every team's schedule.
- August 31, 2018: The Suns traded their projected starting point guard Brandon Knight and power forward Marquese Chriss to the Houston Rockets in exchange for starting power forward Ryan Anderson and rookie point guard De'Anthony Melton.
- September 7, 2018: Former Suns' players Charlie Scott, Jason Kidd, Steve Nash, Grant Hill, and former Suns' president Rick Welts are all inducted in the Naismith Basketball Hall of Fame. It marks the largest number of players from one NBA team to enter the Hall of Fame.
- September 10, 2018: Shooting guard Devin Booker was announced to be out for up to six weeks following surgery on his right pinkie, potentially missing at least the first two or three games of the regular season.
- October 8, 2018: Robert Sarver abruptly fired general manager Ryan McDonough and named former Suns' player James Jones and Trevor Bukstein as the interim general managers for the rest of this season before the regular season began.
- October 15, 2018: The Suns waived Darrell Arthur and Shaquille Harrison to reduce the final roster for the start of the season deadline.
- October 17, 2018: The Suns opened the regular season with a 121–100 win over the Dallas Mavericks, with Devin Booker returning in time for action that day.
- December 12, 2018: Team owner Robert Sarver reportedly threatened to move the Suns after no votes for arena renovations were set up.
- December 17, 2018: The Suns traded Ariza for Austin Rivers and Kelly Oubre Jr. This trade came two days after a planned three-way trade with the Washington Wizards and Memphis Grizzlies fell apart through miscommunication. Rivers was then waived the following day.
- January 23, 2019: The Phoenix City Council approved a new renovation plan for the Talking Stick Resort Arena with a majority 6-2 vote, which includes the team building a new practice facility north of Phoenix (eventually being named the Verizon 5G Performance Center), replacing the old practice court in the arena’s basement, and remaining committed to their home arena until at least 2037.
- February 6, 2019: The Suns agreed to trade Ryan Anderson to the Miami Heat in exchange for Tyler Johnson and Wayne Ellington, waiving the latter player the following day.
- February 27, 2019: Two days after ending their franchise record 17-game losing streak, the Suns reportedly had begun searching for a permanent general manager.
- April 11, 2019: After the conclusion of this season, the Suns announced that James Jones will be the team's permanent general manager moving forward, with co-interim general manager Trevor Bukstein being demoted back to his prior assistant general manager role and Jeff Bower being named senior vice president of basketball operations for some future seasons at hand.
- May 21, 2019: Deandre Ayton is officially named a member of the NBA All-Rookie First Team for being one of the top rookies this season.

== Off-season ==
=== Draft picks ===
| Round | Pick | Player | Position(s) | Nationality | College / Club |
|---|---|---|---|---|---|
| 1 | 1 | Deandre Ayton | C | Bahamas | Arizona |
| 1 | 10 | Mikal Bridges | SF | United States | Villanova |
| 2 | 31 | Élie Okobo | PG | France | (France) Élan Béarnais Pau-Lacq-Orthez |
| 2 | 59 | George King | SG | United States | Colorado |

Entering the draft, the Suns had just two first-round picks and two second-round picks. Their first pick would be their own pick, which became their first ever number one pick in franchise history after 50 seasons. It came as a result of having the second-worst record in franchise history, with only their inaugural season being worse. The Suns were guaranteed just the Miami Heat's first-round pick this year due to a 2015 trade involving the brothers Dragić, with both Zoran and Goran Dragić being traded to Miami in a three-way trade including the New Orleans Pelicans in exchange for the rights to John Salmons, Danny Granger, the Heat's first-round pick this year, and Miami's completely unprotected 2021 first-round pick. Near the conclusion of the previous season, the Suns had a chance to also receive the Milwaukee Bucks' first-round pick as well, as that was projected to be included alongside Greg Monroe and a second-round pick in order to offload Eric Bledsoe, who no longer wanted to be with the Suns. However, despite Miami winning more games against Milwaukee that season, the Suns would not gain Milwaukee's first-round pick this season. However, the Suns still retained the 16th pick from the Heat, alongside their 1st pick, up until draft night.

Phoenix was also projected to have the Los Angeles Lakers' first-round pick from the Steve Nash trade of 2012, but the pick was traded to the Philadelphia 76ers to acquire Brandon Knight in 2015. The Suns regained that selection on draft night in exchange for the Miami Heat's first round selections that were previously acquired. In the second round, the Suns traded their own pick to the Memphis Grizzlies in exchange for Troy Daniels and what would be the Charlotte Hornets' second-round pick, although their own pick was kept by Phoenix due to top 55 protections placed on their own second-round pick for the second year in a row. Phoenix also gained the penultimate pick to the draft, the Toronto Raptors' second-round pick this year, after also gaining last year's second-round pick and the rights to Jared Sullinger in exchange for them briefly acquiring P. J. Tucker. In other transactions around their projected second-round picks, the Hornets' second-round pick would be traded to the Orlando Magic in exchange for Elfrid Payton, and the Bucks' second-round pick would go to the Brooklyn Nets (via a separate trade) due to it being inside the top 47.

With the top pick of the 2018 NBA Draft, the Suns selected the Bahamian freshman center Deandre Ayton from the nearby University of Arizona. While he was reported to be the #1 pick for weeks before the draft, Ayton competed with a few other players such as former high school teammate Marvin Bagley III, international superstar (and former player of new head coach Igor Kokoškov's) Luka Dončić, Jaren Jackson Jr., and Mohamed Bamba during those weeks. In his sole season playing (and starting) in 35 games for Arizona, Ayton averaged 20.1 points (on.612 overall percentage and.343 three-point percentages), 11.6 rebounds, 1.9 blocks, 1.6 assists, and 0.6 steals under 33.5 minutes per game while also being named a consensus All-American First Team, the Pac-12's Player of the Year, the Pac-12's Freshman of the Year, being a member of the All-Pac-12 First Team, winning the Pac-12 Tournament's Most Outstanding Player Award, and winning the Karl Malone Award for being considered the best power forward of the NCAA, even though he projects more as a center entering the NBA. Ayton became a standout player for the Suns almost immediately entering the season, being an immediate starter for the team and being the only rookie this season a double-double average for their rookie season, averaging 16.3 points and 10.3 rebounds throughout the season. He ended the season being a member of the NBA All-Rookie First Team, with Ayton being a key figure for the Suns' future going forward.

With the 16th selection, the Suns picked Texas Tech University's Zhaire Smith, but immediately traded Smith and the Miami Heat's 2021 first-round pick to the Philadelphia 76ers for the tenth overall pick (which actually was originally a part of their draft hoard from previous seasons back when it was known as a 2015 first-round pick from the Los Angeles Lakers), junior small forward Mikal Bridges from Villanova University. Bridges was considered a key member for Villanova when they won the NCAA Championship in two of his three seasons there. As the starting small forward for all 40 games played the previous season, he averaged 17.7 points (on.514 overall percentage and a.435 three-point percentage), 5.3 rebounds, 1.9 assists, 1.5 steals, and 1.1 blocks under 32.2 minutes per game. In addition to being a two-time NCAA Tournament Champion in 2016 and 2018, Bridges also was named a consensus All-American Third Team member, an All-Big East First Team member, a Big East Tournament MVP, and the winner of the Julius Erving Award, all of which were earned in 2018. This marked the second season in three years where the Suns had two top ten picks in the draft, though this time, it was considered a massive success for them. Bridges also became a key player for future seasons as well for his defensive versatility, alongside his improved shooting during said seasons. The Suns also selected French All-Star point guard Élie Okobo of the Élan Béarnais Pau-Lacq-Orthez from France's LNB Pro A as the 31st pick and shooting guard George King from the University of Colorado Boulder with the penultimate 59th pick. Okobo was made part of the regular, 15-man roster, while King became one of the team's two-way contracts that season. Furthermore, they later traded for (and signed) another second-round pick in USC sophomore point guard De'Anthony Melton, the 46th pick of the NBA Draft, before the season began. Later in the season, the Suns signed Ray Spalding, the 56th pick of the NBA Draft selected from the University of Louisville, for the rest of the season, which left them with 6 total draft picks from this draft on their roster by the end of this season.

=== Free agency ===
Before June 26, the only players that were confirmed free agents were Oleksiy "Alex" Len (unrestricted) and Elfrid Payton (restricted, but the Suns had declared to not use their right of first refusal on him). Former two-way contract players Alec Peters and Danuel House also had the option to enter free agency or stay for a second year under a two-way contract. House then signed to play for the Houston Rockets in the 2018 NBA Summer League, while Peters stuck with the team during the event. Tyler Ulis was waived from his contract on June 30 for the purpose of extra salary cap space. Two days later, the Suns waived Alan Williams' non-guaranteed deal and the exception rights on the two-way contracts of Alec Peters and Danuel House to create more salary cap space.

Near the start of free agency on July 1, the Suns agreed to terms with the now former Houston Rockets forward Trevor Ariza on a one-year deal worth $15,000,000, which was signed officially on July 6. Ariza was considered their top free agent priority that season. Also on July 1, Suns' restricted free agent Elfrid Payton signed a one-year deal with the New Orleans Pelicans, his hometown team. On July 7, the Suns' star shooting guard Devin Booker agreed to a five-year maximum contract extension of around $158.3 million to remain with the team. It was the seventh-highest valued contract of the NBA at the time of its signing. On July 20, they announced that they had retained both Davon Reed and Shaquille Harrison, and also completed two separate trades. Their first trade involved sending guard/forward Jared Dudley and their top-35 protected 2021 second-round pick to the Brooklyn Nets in exchange for power forward Darrell Arthur. Not long after the trade for Arthur, the Suns sent $1,000,000 in cash considerations to the Philadelphia 76ers in a trade for power forward/center Richaun Holmes. The next day, Oleksiy "Alex" Len signed a two-year deal with the Atlanta Hawks. Alec Peters then signed with PBC CSKA Moscow in Russia instead of retaining his two-way contract with the team. On July 25, their other former two-way contract, Danuel House Jr. signed a regular, one-year contract with the two-time defending champion Golden State Warriors. Alan Williams later signed a two-way contract with the Brooklyn Nets on September 19, and Tyler Ulis signed a training camp deal with the Golden State Warriors two days later.

On August 3, the Suns announced they had re-signed a point guard from the previous season, Isaiah Canaan. The team later announced his deal was a non-guaranteed training camp deal, but it marked a return to play after his previous season ended with an ankle fracture on January 31, 2018. Before the month of August concluded, the Suns traded both projected starting point guard Brandon Knight and third-year power forward Marquese Chriss to the Houston Rockets in exchange for new starting power forward Ryan Anderson and rookie point guard De'Anthony Melton, who was previously drafted by Houston. In order to make the trade work, Anderson agreed to cut back on his salary for next season to the same amount that Brandon Knight would have been paid; the Suns also sent a $2.6 million traded player exception to the Rockets. Melton signed a rookie deal with the Suns on September 21 after waiting on trying to have a potential point guard trade. On October 15, they waived point guard Shaquille Harrison and power forward Darrell Arthur, with the Suns failing to get a disabled player exception for Arthur's roster spot before season starting rosters had to be finalized. Shooting guard Davon Reed was also waived the following day and replaced by veteran guard Jamal Crawford.

On November 4, center Tyson Chandler agreed to a buyout with the Suns, later playing the rest of the season with the Los Angeles Lakers. On November 23, Isaiah Canaan agreed to leave the team via waiver, eventually playing briefly for the Milwaukee Bucks and Minnesota Timberwolves. On December 7, Phoenix signed Northern Arizona Suns guard Jawun Evans as their second two-way contract, though he would be waived on March 23, 2019 to later play for the Oklahoma City Thunder. Three days after that signing, Phoenix signed power forward/center Eric Moreland to a one-year deal, though they would waive him on January 3, 2019, after playing only one game with them, eventually signing with future NBA Finals champions, the Toronto Raptors. A week after that, the Suns agreed to trade their biggest free agent acquisition, Trevor Ariza to the Washington Wizards for small forward Kelly Oubre Jr. and point guard Austin Rivers (who got waived the next day). Initially, the Suns planned on having a three-way trade with the Wizards and Memphis Grizzlies for some different players in mind, but miscommunication involving the Suns and Grizzlies (specifically whether it was Dillon Brooks or MarShon Brooks that was going to be traded to Phoenix in the original deal) eventually led to the trade between just the Suns and Wizards instead. In January 2019, the Suns started to sign 10-day contracts with various players. They first gave power forward Quincy Acy two 10-day contracts on January 7 and 17 before giving former Lincoln Memorial University power forward Emanuel Terry a 10-day contract on January 27. On the February 6 trade deadline, Phoenix traded away power forward Ryan Anderson to the Miami Heat for guards Tyler Johnson and Wayne Ellington, with the latter player also being waived the next day. Fourteen days after the trade, the Suns signed former Dallas Mavericks power forward Ray Spalding to a 10-day contract before getting a two-year, partially guaranteed deal on March 3. Finally, on March 22, the Suns signed guard Jimmer Fredette from China to a similar two-year, partially guaranteed deal to return to the NBA for the rest of the season to finish off their season.

=== Coaching changes ===
In March 2018, the Suns confirmed they were searching for a permanent head coach, although interim head coach Jay Triano was also stated as a candidate. The vice president of basketball operations at the time, James Jones, revealed that as many as 20 potential candidates were looked into for the head coach position between March and May 2018. Some of their potential interests during this coaching search included former Suns and Utah Jazz assistant coach Igor Kokoškov, former Memphis Grizzlies head coach David Fizdale, European head coach David Blatt, then-current Atlanta Hawks head coach Mike Budenholzer, former Charlotte Hornets head coach Steve Clifford, former Orlando Magic head coach Frank Vogel, San Antonio Spurs assistant coach James Borrego, former Houston Rockets head coach Kevin McHale, Toronto Raptors assistant coaches Rex Kalamian and Nick Nurse, New Orleans Pelicans associate coach Chris Finch, and former Suns players Jason Kidd and Vinny Del Negro. On May 2, 2018, Triano was relieved of all of his coaching duties with the Suns as Kokoškov was announced to sign a three-year contract as Phoenix's newest head coach.

On the same day the Suns relieved Jay Triano of his coaching duties, Phoenix also released assistant coach Tyrone Corbin alongside most of the old coaching staff, including former Northern Arizona Suns coach Tyrone Ellis. Triano became an associate head coach for the Charlotte Hornets, while Corbin became an assistant coach for the Orlando Magic, and Marlon Garnett joined the Atlanta Hawks' coaching staff. Former Orlando Magic assistant coach Corliss Williamson then joined Kokoškov's coaching staff in Phoenix. Williamson was familiar with Kokoškov as he played when Kokoškov was an assistant coach during the Detroit Pistons' 2003–04 championship season. On June 4, former Milwaukee Bucks interim head coach Joe Prunty became the team's leading assistant head coach. A week later, Jason Staudt, an assistant coach under Kokoškov during his coaching tenure with the Georgia national basketball team, became an assistant coach for Phoenix, while former player Devin Smith became a player development coach. On June 18, the Suns hired former Arizona State University point guard and New Orleans Pelicans assistant coach Jamelle McMillan as an assistant coach. On June 22, the Suns also promoted Northern Arizona Suns head coach Cody Toppert to the director of player development position in Phoenix. On July 25, assistant coach Bret Burchard, one of the few Suns' coaches retained from the previous season, was named the head coach for the Northern Arizona Suns. Former Northern Arizona Suns' head coach and Phoenix Suns assistant coach Tyrone Ellis also left the Suns organization to become the head coach of the Stockton Kings.

=== Front office changes ===
During the preseason on October 8, 2018, owner Robert Sarver made the abrupt decision to fire general manager Ryan McDonough. His decision was reflected upon the lack of a starting-caliber point guard being acquired by that point of the season. As a result, vice president of basketball operations James Jones and assistant general manager Trevor Bukstein were named the interim general managers for the rest of this season. Later that same day, the team also fired assistant general manager Pat Connelly, director of scouting Courtney Witte, director of international scouting Emilio Kovačić, and Northern Arizona Suns general manager Louis Lehman.

== Roster ==
2018–19 Phoenix Suns roster
Players

| Pos. | No. | Player | Height | Weight | DOB | From |
|---|---|---|---|---|---|---|
| C | 22 | Deandre Ayton (injured) | 7 ft 1 in (2.16 m) | 250 lb (113 kg) | 1998–07–23 | Arizona |
| F | 35 | Dragan Bender | 7 ft 1 in (2.16 m) | 225 lb (102 kg) | 1997–11–17 | Croatia |
| G | 1 | Devin Booker (injured) | 6 ft 6 in (1.98 m) | 210 lb (95 kg) | 1996–10–30 | Kentucky |
| F | 25 | Mikal Bridges | 6 ft 7 in (2.01 m) | 210 lb (95 kg) | 1996–08–30 | Villanova |
| G | 11 | Jamal Crawford | 6 ft 5 in (1.96 m) | 185 lb (84 kg) | 1980–03–20 | Michigan |
| G | 30 | Troy Daniels | 6 ft 4 in (1.93 m) | 205 lb (93 kg) | 1991–07–15 | VCU |
| G | 32 | Jimmer Fredette | 6 ft 2 in (1.88 m) | 195 lb (88 kg) | 1989–02–25 | BYU |
| F/C | 21 | Richaun Holmes (injured) | 6 ft 10 in (2.08 m) | 235 lb (107 kg) | 1993–10–15 | Bowling Green |
| F | 20 | Josh Jackson | 6 ft 8 in (2.03 m) | 200 lb (91 kg) | 1997–02–10 | Kansas |
| G | 16 | Tyler Johnson (injured) | 6 ft 4 in (1.93 m) | 190 lb (86 kg) | 1992–05–07 | Fresno State |
| F | 8 | George King (TW) | 6 ft 6 in (1.98 m) | 220 lb (100 kg) | 1994–01–15 | Colorado |
| G | 14 | De'Anthony Melton | 6 ft 4 in (1.93 m) | 200 lb (91 kg) | 1998–05–28 | USC |
| G | 2 | Élie Okobo | 6 ft 2 in (1.88 m) | 190 lb (86 kg) | 1997–10–23 | France |
| F | 3 | Kelly Oubre (injured) | 6 ft 7 in (2.01 m) | 205 lb (93 kg) | 1995–12–09 | Kansas |
| PF | 26 | Ray Spalding | 6 ft 10 in (2.08 m) | 215 lb (98 kg) | 1997–03-11 | Louisville |
| F | 12 | T. J. Warren (injured) | 6 ft 8 in (2.03 m) | 215 lb (98 kg) | 1993–09–05 | NC State |

Coaches
Head coach
- Igor Kokoškov
Assistant(s)
- Joe Prunty
- Jamelle McMillan
- Jason Staudt
- Corliss Williamson
- Cody Toppert (player development)
- Devin Smith (player development)
- Brady Howe (strength & conditioning)

Legend
- (DP) Unsigned draft pick
- (FA) Free agent
- (S) Suspended
- (GL) On assignment to G League affiliate
- (TW) Two-way affiliate player
- Injured

Roster
Updated: 2019–04–03

=== Salaries ===
| Player | 2018–19 Salary |
|---|---|
| Tyler Johnson | $19,245,370 |
| T. J. Warren | $11,750,000 |
| Deandre Ayton | $8,175,840 |
| Josh Jackson | $6,041,520 |
| Dragan Bender | $4,661,280 |
| Mikal Bridges | $3,557,400 |
| Devin Booker | $3,314,365 |
| Troy Daniels | $3,258,539 |
| Kelly Oubre Jr. | $3,208,630 |
| Jamal Crawford | $2,393,887 |
| Richuan Holmes | $1,600,520 |
| Élie Okobo | $1,238,464 |
| De'Anthony Melton | $949,000 |
| Jimmer Fredette | $198,579 |
| Ray Spalding | $184,746 |
| George King | $77,250 |
| Total | $68,745,390 |

For this season, the minimum salary for two-way contracts is at $77,250, while the maximum salary is around $385,000, with potential to earn up to $506,215 in certain situations. As a result of the pre-season waiving of Darrell Arthur, Davon Reed, and Shaquille Harrison, both Arthur and Reed had their fully guaranteed respective salaries of $7,464,912 and $1,378,242 retained for the rest of the season (though with Reed later signing a two-way contract with the Indiana Pacers, Phoenix only paid $675,000 instead), while Harrison only received the partial guarantee of $50,000 he acquired earlier in the season. When Tyson Chandler and Isaiah Canaan were bought out and waived on November 3 and 28 respectively, the Suns opened more salary for the remainder of the season. Phoenix also bought out Austin Rivers' contract the day after trading for him on December 18, 2018. Eric Moreland was then waived on January 3, 2019, leaving the Suns with $33 million of dead salary cap space. With the waiving of Wayne Ellington after previously acquiring him on February 6, his $6,270,000 was also added onto the dead salary of the team's season. This left them with the third-highest amount of dead money for the season behind only the Atlanta Hawks and New York Knicks.

== Preseason ==
The Suns were one of the six NBA teams announced to take part in a series of preseason contests with the National Basketball League and scheduled to play the New Zealand Breakers in Phoenix. The official pre-season schedule was revealed on August 1 with their first game scheduled for October 1. This preseason period was also without Devin Booker, as he was recovering from pinkie surgery at the time, with the intent on returning before the regular season began. A week after the Suns started the pre-season, during which time they earned a 1–2 record, with their sole victory in a close game against the New Zealand Breakers, team owner Robert Sarver fired general manager Ryan McDonough and replaced them with both James Jones and Trevor Bukstein under interim general manager positions the morning of their penultimate preseason game against the Golden State Warriors. The team ended the preseason with a 2–3 record, with Jones and Bukstein both taking over and sharing general manager duties for the rest of this season afterward.

2018 preseason game log
Total: 2–3 (Home: 1–2; Road: 1–1)
Preseason: 2–3 (home: 1–2; road: 1–1)

| Game | Date | Team | Score | High points | High rebounds | High assists | Location Attendance | Record |
|---|---|---|---|---|---|---|---|---|
| 1 | October 1 | Sacramento | L 102–106 | Deandre Ayton (24) | Deandre Ayton (9) | Josh Jackson (6) | Talking Stick Resort Arena; 8,184 | 0–1 |
| 2 | October 3 | New Zealand | W 91–86 | Deandre Ayton (21) | Deandre Ayton (15) | Trevor Ariza (6) | Talking Stick Resort Arena; 7,183 | 1–1 |
| 3 | October 5 | Portland | L 93–115 | Deandre Ayton (19) | Deandre Ayton (14) | Josh Jackson (7) | Talking Stick Resort Arena; 11,811 | 1–2 |
| 4 | October 8 | @ Golden State | W 117–109 | Deandre Ayton, Ryan Anderson (18) | Deandre Ayton (7) | Isaiah Canaan, Shaquille Harrison, Josh Jackson (5) | Oracle Arena; 19,596 | 2–2 |
| 5 | October 10 | @ Portland | L 83–116 | Josh Jackson (13) | Davon Reed (6) | Josh Jackson, Dragan Bender, Tyson Chandler (4) | Moda Center; 15,051 | 2–3 |

2018–19 season schedule

== Standings ==
| Pacific Division | W | L | PCT | GB | Home | Road | Div | GP |
|---|---|---|---|---|---|---|---|---|
| c – Golden State Warriors | 57 | 25 | .695 | – | 30‍–‍11 | 27‍–‍14 | 13–3 | 82 |
| x – Los Angeles Clippers | 48 | 34 | .585 | 9.0 | 26‍–‍15 | 22‍–‍19 | 11–5 | 82 |
| Sacramento Kings | 39 | 43 | .476 | 18.0 | 24‍–‍17 | 15‍–‍26 | 4–12 | 82 |
| Los Angeles Lakers | 37 | 45 | .451 | 20.0 | 22‍–‍19 | 15‍–‍26 | 9–7 | 82 |
| Phoenix Suns | 19 | 63 | .232 | 38.0 | 12‍–‍29 | 7‍–‍34 | 3–13 | 82 |

Western Conference
| # | Team | W | L | PCT | GB | GP |
|---|---|---|---|---|---|---|
| 1 | c – Golden State Warriors * | 57 | 25 | .695 | – | 82 |
| 2 | y – Denver Nuggets * | 54 | 28 | .659 | 3.0 | 82 |
| 3 | x – Portland Trail Blazers | 53 | 29 | .646 | 4.0 | 82 |
| 4 | y – Houston Rockets * | 53 | 29 | .646 | 4.0 | 82 |
| 5 | x – Utah Jazz | 50 | 32 | .610 | 7.0 | 82 |
| 6 | x – Oklahoma City Thunder | 49 | 33 | .598 | 8.0 | 82 |
| 7 | x – San Antonio Spurs | 48 | 34 | .585 | 9.0 | 82 |
| 8 | x – Los Angeles Clippers | 48 | 34 | .585 | 9.0 | 82 |
| 9 | Sacramento Kings | 39 | 43 | .476 | 18.0 | 82 |
| 10 | Los Angeles Lakers | 37 | 45 | .451 | 20.0 | 82 |
| 11 | Minnesota Timberwolves | 36 | 46 | .439 | 21.0 | 82 |
| 12 | Memphis Grizzlies | 33 | 49 | .402 | 24.0 | 82 |
| 13 | New Orleans Pelicans | 33 | 49 | .402 | 24.0 | 82 |
| 14 | Dallas Mavericks | 33 | 49 | .402 | 24.0 | 82 |
| 15 | Phoenix Suns | 19 | 63 | .232 | 38.0 | 82 |

== Game log ==
2018–19 game log
Total: 19–63 (Home: 12–29; Road: 7–34)
October: 1–6 (home: 1–2; road: 0–4)

| Game | Date | Team | Score | High points | High rebounds | High assists | Location Attendance | Record |
|---|---|---|---|---|---|---|---|---|
| 1 | October 17 | Dallas | W 121–100 | Devin Booker (35) | Deandre Ayton (10) | Trevor Ariza, Devin Booker, Isaiah Canaan (7) | Talking Stick Resort Arena; 18,422 | 1–0 |
| 2 | October 20 | @ Denver | L 91–119 | Devin Booker (25) | Deandre Ayton, Tyson Chandler (8) | Devin Booker (7) | Pepsi Center; 19,592 | 1–1 |
| 3 | October 22 | @ Golden State | L 103–123 | Devin Booker (28) | Deandre Ayton (14) | Devin Booker (6) | Oracle Arena; 19,596 | 1–2 |
| 4 | October 24 | L.A. Lakers | L 113–131 | Devin Booker (23) | Deandre Ayton (11) | Devin Booker (7) | Talking Stick Resort Arena; 18,055 | 1–3 |
| 5 | October 27 | @ Memphis | L 96–117 | Deandre Ayton (24) | Deandre Ayton (8) | Deandre Ayton, Trevor Ariza (5) | FedExForum; 15,926 | 1–4 |
| 6 | October 28 | @ Oklahoma City | L 110–117 | T. J. Warren, Élie Okobo (18) | Deandre Ayton (11) | Élie Okobo (7) | Chesapeake Energy Arena; 18,203 | 1–5 |
| 7 | October 31 | San Antonio | L 90–120 | T. J. Warren (21) | Deandre Ayton (8) | Élie Okobo (5) | Talking Stick Resort Arena; 12,328 | 1–6 |

November : 3–12 (home: 2–6; road: 1–6)

| Game | Date | Team | Score | High points | High rebounds | High assists | Location Attendance | Record |
|---|---|---|---|---|---|---|---|---|
| 8 | November 2 | Toronto | L 98–107 | Isaiah Canaan (19) | Deandre Ayton (18) | Trevor Ariza (4) | Talking Stick Resort Arena; 15,843 | 1–7 |
| 9 | November 4 | Memphis | W 102–100 | Devin Booker (25) | Trevor Ariza (9) | Devin Booker (7) | Talking Stick Resort Arena; 13,074 | 2–7 |
| 10 | November 6 | Brooklyn | L 82–104 | Devin Booker (20) | Deandre Ayton (13) | Isaiah Canaan (4) | Talking Stick Resort Arena; 14,205 | 2–8 |
| 11 | November 8 | Boston | L 109–116 (OT) | Devin Booker (38) | Deandre Ayton (10) | Devin Booker (9) | Talking Stick Resort Arena; 17,359 | 2–9 |
| 12 | November 10 | @ New Orleans | L 99–119 | T. J. Warren (25) | Deandre Ayton (12) | Devin Booker (7) | Smoothie King Center; 15,222 | 2–10 |
| 13 | November 12 | @ Oklahoma City | L 101–118 | T. J. Warren (21) | Deandre Ayton, Richaun Holmes (7) | Devin Booker (6) | Chesapeake Energy Arena; 18,203 | 2–11 |
| 14 | November 14 | San Antonio | W 116–96 | T. J. Warren (27) | Deandre Ayton (10) | Devin Booker (12) | Talking Stick Resort Arena; 14,532 | 3–11 |
| 15 | November 17 | Oklahoma City | L 100–110 | T. J. Warren (23) | Deandre Ayton (9) | Devin Booker (12) | Talking Stick Resort Arena; 16,376 | 3–12 |
| 16 | November 19 | @ Philadelphia | L 114–119 | Devin Booker (37) | Deandre Ayton (9) | Devin Booker (8) | Wells Fargo Center; 20,459 | 3–13 |
| 17 | November 21 | @ Chicago | L 116–124 | Devin Booker (23) | Deandre Ayton (12) | Devin Booker, Isaiah Canaan (6) | United Center; 19,014 | 3–14 |
| 18 | November 23 | @ Milwaukee | W 116–114 | Devin Booker (29) | Trevor Ariza (11) | Devin Booker (7) | Fiserv Forum; 17,852 | 4–14 |
| 19 | November 25 | @ Detroit | L 107–118 | Devin Booker (37) | Deandre Ayton (14) | Devin Booker, Jamal Crawford (5) | Little Caesars Arena; 14,413 | 4–15 |
| 20 | November 27 | Indiana | L 104–109 | Devin Booker (25) | Trevor Ariza (12) | Devin Booker (8) | Talking Stick Resort Arena; 13,038 | 4–16 |
| 21 | November 28 | @ L.A. Clippers | L 99–115 | Devin Booker (23) | Deandre Ayton (9) | Trevor Ariza, Devin Booker, Jamal Crawford, Élie Okobo (4) | Staples Center; 16,372 | 4–17 |
| 22 | November 30 | Orlando | L 85–99 | Deandre Ayton (19) | Josh Jackson, Deandre Ayton (9) | Josh Jackson (7) | Talking Stick Resort Arena; 13,228 | 4–18 |

December : 5–11 (home: 2–6; road: 3–5)

| Game | Date | Team | Score | High points | High rebounds | High assists | Location Attendance | Record |
|---|---|---|---|---|---|---|---|---|
| 23 | December 2 | @ L.A. Lakers | L 96–120 | Richaun Holmes (15) | Deandre Ayton (10) | Jamal Crawford, Élie Okobo (4) | Staples Center; 18,997 | 4–19 |
| 24 | December 4 | Sacramento | L 105–122 | De'Anthony Melton (21) | Deandre Ayton (9) | De'Anthony Melton (5) | Talking Stick Resort Arena; 12,977 | 4–20 |
| 25 | December 6 | @ Portland | L 86–108 | Troy Daniels (15) | Deandre Ayton (8) | Jamal Crawford (5) | Moda Center; 19,001 | 4–21 |
| 26 | December 7 | Miami | L 98–115 | Troy Daniels (18) | Deandre Ayton (11) | Trevor Ariza (6) | Talking Stick Resort Arena; 14,273 | 4–22 |
| 27 | December 10 | L.A. Clippers | L 119–123 (OT) | Deandre Ayton (20) | Deandre Ayton (12) | Josh Jackson, De'Anthony Melton (8) | Talking Stick Resort Arena; 12,088 | 4–23 |
| 28 | December 11 | @ San Antonio | L 86–111 | Josh Jackson (23) | Deandre Ayton (11) | De'Anthony Melton (6) | AT&T Center; 17,676 | 4–24 |
| 29 | December 13 | Dallas | W 99–89 | T. J. Warren (30) | Trevor Ariza, Josh Jackson (8) | Trevor Ariza, Jamal Crawford (5) | Talking Stick Resort Arena; 13,265 | 5–24 |
| 30 | December 15 | Minnesota | W 107–99 | Devin Booker (28) | Deandre Ayton (12) | Devin Booker, Jamal Crawford (7) | Talking Stick Resort Arena; 14,244 | 6–24 |
| 31 | December 17 | @ New York | W 128–110 | Devin Booker (38) | Deandre Ayton (13) | Jamal Crawford (14) | Madison Square Garden; 18,437 | 7–24 |
| 32 | December 19 | @ Boston | W 111–103 | Devin Booker (25) | Deandre Ayton (18) | Devin Booker (8) | TD Garden; 18,624 | 8–24 |
| 33 | December 22 | @ Washington | L 146–149 (3OT) | Devin Booker (33) | Deandre Ayton (17) | Devin Booker (14) | Capital One Arena; 16,571 | 8–25 |
| 34 | December 23 | @ Brooklyn | L 103–111 | Deandre Ayton (26) | Deandre Ayton (18) | Devin Booker (9) | Barclays Center; 15,310 | 8–26 |
| 35 | December 26 | @ Orlando | W 122–120 (OT) | Devin Booker (35) | Deandre Ayton (12) | Devin Booker (8) | Amway Center; 16,755 | 9–26 |
| 36 | December 28 | Oklahoma City | L 102–118 | Devin Booker (25) | Deandre Ayton (9) | Devin Booker (10) | Talking Stick Resort Arena; 18,055 | 9–27 |
| 37 | December 29 | Denver | L 118–122 | Deandre Ayton (33) | Deandre Ayton (14) | Devin Booker (8) | Talking Stick Resort Arena; 14,975 | 9–28 |
| 38 | December 31 | Golden State | L 109–132 | Deandre Ayton (25) | Deandre Ayton (10) | Devin Booker (6) | Oracle Arena; 16,906 | 9–29 |

January : 2–13 (home: 2–5; road: 0–8)

| Game | Date | Team | Score | High points | High rebounds | High assists | Location Attendance | Record |
|---|---|---|---|---|---|---|---|---|
| 39 | January 2 | Philadelphia | L 127–132 | Devin Booker (37) | Deandre Ayton (11) | Devin Booker (8) | Talking Stick Resort Arena; 15,226 | 9–30 |
| 40 | January 4 | L.A. Clippers | L 111–121 | Devin Booker (23) | Deandre Ayton, Josh Jackson (5) | Devin Booker, Jamal Crawford, Élie Okobo (4) | Talking Stick Resort Arena; 18,422 | 9–31 |
| 41 | January 6 | Charlotte | L 113–119 | T. J. Warren (23) | Deandre Ayton (9) | T. J. Warren (5) | Talking Stick Resort Arena; 13,110 | 9–32 |
| 42 | January 8 | Sacramento | W 115–111 | Kelly Oubre Jr. (26) | Deandre Ayton (12) | De'Anthony Melton (8) | Talking Stick Resort Arena; 13,977 | 10–32 |
| 43 | January 9 | @ Dallas | L 94–104 | T. J. Warren (23) | T. J. Warren (7) | De'Anthony Melton (6) | American Airlines Center; 19,596 | 10–33 |
| 44 | January 12 | Denver | W 102–93 | Deandre Ayton (22) | Deandre Ayton (13) | De'Anthony Melton (10) | Talking Stick Resort Arena; 15,246 | 11–33 |
| 45 | January 15 | @ Indiana | L 97–131 | T. J. Warren (18) | Deandre Ayton (8) | De'Anthony Melton (8) | Bankers Life Fieldhouse; 15,698 | 11–34 |
| 46 | January 17 | @ Toronto | L 109–111 | Devin Booker (30) | Deandre Ayton (17) | Devin Booker (8) | Scotiabank Arena; 19,800 | 11–35 |
| 47 | January 19 | @ Charlotte | L 115–135 | Devin Booker (32) | Quincy Acy (5) | Devin Booker (11) | Spectrum Center; 19,278 | 11–36 |
| 48 | January 20 | @ Minnesota | L 114–116 | T. J. Warren (20) | Dragan Bender (10) | Devin Booker (6) | Target Center; 14,607 | 11–37 |
| 49 | January 22 | Minnesota | L 91–118 | Josh Jackson (27) | Dragan Bender (10) | Devin Booker, Mikal Bridges, Jamal Crawford, De'Anthony Melton (4) | Talking Stick Resort Arena; 14,460 | 11–38 |
| 50 | January 24 | Portland | L 106–120 | Devin Booker (27) | Josh Jackson (9) | Kelly Oubre Jr. (7) | Talking Stick Resort Arena; 15,441 | 11–39 |
| 51 | January 25 | @ Denver | L 95–132 | Devin Booker (35) | Quincy Acy (10) | Jamal Crawford (5) | Pepsi Center; 17,425 | 11–40 |
| 52 | January 27 | @ L.A. Lakers | L 102–116 | Devin Booker (21) | Richaun Holmes (10) | Devin Booker (6) | Staples Center; 18,997 | 11–41 |
| 53 | January 29 | @ San Antonio | L 124–126 | Devin Booker (38) | Kelly Oubre Jr. (7) | Devin Booker, Jamal Crawford (7) | AT&T Center; 18,121 | 11–42 |

February : 1–8 (home: 0–3; road: 1–5)

| Game | Date | Team | Score | High points | High rebounds | High assists | Location Attendance | Record |
|---|---|---|---|---|---|---|---|---|
| 54 | February 2 | Atlanta | L 112–118 | Devin Booker (32) | Deandre Ayton (11) | Élie Okobo (11) | Talking Stick Resort Arena; 15,534 | 11–43 |
| 55 | February 4 | Houston | L 110–118 | Josh Jackson (25) | Deandre Ayton (11) | Jamal Crawford (9) | Talking Stick Resort Arena; 15,740 | 11–44 |
| 56 | February 6 | @ Utah | L 88–116 | Josh Jackson (27) | Deandre Ayton (9) | Josh Jackson (7) | Vivint Smart Home Arena; 18,306 | 11–45 |
| 57 | February 8 | Golden State | L 107–117 | Kelly Oubre Jr. (25) | Kelly Oubre Jr., Deandre Ayton (12) | Josh Jackson, Dragan Bender (5) | Talking Stick Resort Arena; 17,081 | 11–46 |
| 58 | February 10 | @ Sacramento | L 104–117 | Devin Booker (27) | Deandre Ayton, Richaun Holmes (9) | Devin Booker (6) | Golden 1 Center; 17,583 | 11–47 |
| 59 | February 13 | @ L.A. Clippers | L 107–134 | Kelly Oubre Jr. (28) | Deandre Ayton (8) | Jamal Crawford (6) | Staples Center; 17,703 | 11–48 |
All-Star Break
| 60 | February 21 | @ Cleveland | L 98–111 | Devin Booker (30) | Deandre Ayton (9) | Devin Booker (7) | Quicken Loans Arena; 19,022 | 11–49 |
| 61 | February 23 | @ Atlanta | L 112–120 | Tyler Johnson (29) | Deandre Ayton (12) | Devin Booker (8) | State Farm Arena; 15,214 | 11–50 |
| 62 | February 25 | @ Miami | W 124–121 | Devin Booker (20) | Deandre Ayton (10) | Devin Booker (9) | American Airlines Arena; 19,600 | 12–50 |

March : 5–10 (home: 3–5; road: 2–5)

| Game | Date | Team | Score | High points | High rebounds | High assists | Location Attendance | Record |
|---|---|---|---|---|---|---|---|---|
| 63 | March 1 | New Orleans | L 116–130 | Devin Booker (26) | Deandre Ayton (8) | Devin Booker (7) | Talking Stick Resort Arena; 14,123 | 12–51 |
| 64 | March 2 | L.A. Lakers | W 118–109 | Deandre Ayton (26) | Deandre Ayton (10) | Devin Booker, De'Anthony Melton, Kelly Oubre Jr. (4) | Talking Stick Resort Arena; 18,055 | 13–51 |
| 65 | March 4 | Milwaukee | W 114–105 | Kelly Oubre Jr. (27) | Kelly Oubre Jr. (13) | Devin Booker (7) | Talking Stick Resort Arena; 18,055 | 14–51 |
| 66 | March 6 | New York | W 107–96 | Devin Booker (41) | Deandre Ayton (6) | Tyler Johnson (6) | Talking Stick Resort Arena; 14,427 | 15–51 |
| 67 | March 9 | @ Portland | L 120–127 | Devin Booker (23) | Deandre Ayton (8) | Tyler Johnson (7) | Moda Center; 19,851 | 15–52 |
| 68 | March 10 | @ Golden State | W 115–111 | Devin Booker (37) | Deandre Ayton (9) | Devin Booker (11) | Oracle Arena; 19,596 | 16–52 |
| 69 | March 13 | Utah | L 97–114 | Devin Booker (27) | Deandre Ayton (9) | Devin Booker (6) | Talking Stick Resort Arena; 18,055 | 16–53 |
| 70 | March 15 | @ Houston | L 102–108 | Devin Booker (29) | Deandre Ayton (14) | Devin Booker (7) | Toyota Center; 18,055 | 16–54 |
| 71 | March 16 | @ New Orleans | W 138–136 (OT) | Devin Booker (40) | De'Anthony Melton (8) | Devin Booker (13) | Smoothie King Center; 17,641 | 17–54 |
| 72 | March 18 | Chicago | L 101–116 | Devin Booker (25) | Deandre Ayton (12) | Devin Booker (7) | Talking Stick Resort Arena; 15,879 | 17–55 |
| 73 | March 21 | Detroit | L 98–118 | Devin Booker (26) | Deandre Ayton (8) | Mikal Bridges (7) | Talking Stick Resort Arena; 16,066 | 17–56 |
| 74 | March 23 | @ Sacramento | L 103–112 | Devin Booker (32) | Deandre Ayton (11) | Devin Booker (10) | Golden 1 Center; 17,583 | 17–57 |
| 75 | March 25 | @ Utah | L 92–125 | Devin Booker (59) | Deandre Ayton (7) | Devin Booker, Élie Okobo (4) | Vivint Smart Home Arena; 18,306 | 17–58 |
| 76 | March 27 | Washington | L 121–124 | Devin Booker (50) | Devin Booker, Deandre Ayton (10) | Jamal Crawford (7) | Talking Stick Resort Arena; 16,004 | 17–59 |
| 77 | March 30 | Memphis | L 115–120 | Devin Booker (48) | Deandre Ayton (11) | Devin Booker (13) | Talking Stick Resort Arena; 16,647 | 17–60 |

April : 2–3 (home: 2–1; road: 0–2)

| Game | Date | Team | Score | High points | High rebounds | High assists | Location Attendance | Record |
|---|---|---|---|---|---|---|---|---|
| 78 | April 1 | Cleveland | W 122–113 | Devin Booker (25) | Dragan Bender, Richaun Holmes, Josh Jackson (10) | Devin Booker (13) | Talking Stick Resort Arena; 14,050 | 18–60 |
| 79 | April 3 | Utah | L 97–118 | Richaun Holmes (16) | Richaun Holmes (9) | De'Anthony Melton (5) | Talking Stick Resort Arena; 15,797 | 18–61 |
| 80 | April 5 | New Orleans | W 133–126 (OT) | Josh Jackson (35) | Ray Spalding (13) | Jamal Crawford (7) | Talking Stick Resort Arena; 16,410 | 19–61 |
| 81 | April 7 | @ Houston | L 113–149 | Jamal Crawford (27) | Josh Jackson (9) | Josh Jackson, Jamal Crawford (6) | Toyota Center; 18,055 | 19–62 |
| 82 | April 9 | @ Dallas | L 109–120 | Jamal Crawford (51) | Dragan Bender (11) | Dragan Bender (6) | American Airlines Center; 21,041 | 19–63 |

2018–19 season schedule

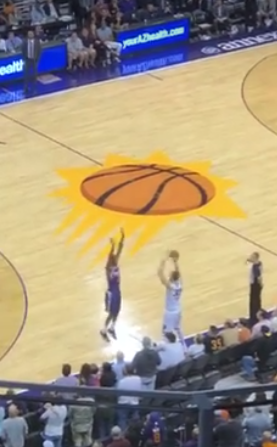
The Phoenix Suns (purple) played the Memphis Grizzlies (white) in an NBA game at Phoenix on November 4, 2018, and won 102–100.

== Player statistics ==
Legend
| GP | Games played | GS | Games started | MPG | Minutes per game |
| FG% | Field-goal percentage | 3P% | 3-point field-goal percentage | FT% | Free-throw percentage |
| RPG | Rebounds per game | APG | Assists per game | SPG | Steals per game |
| BPG | Blocks per game | PPG | Points per game |

Phoenix Suns statistics
| Player | GP | GS | MPG | FG% | 3P% | FT% | RPG | APG | SPG | BPG | PPG |
|---|---|---|---|---|---|---|---|---|---|---|---|
| Quincy Acy | 10 | 0 | 12.3 | .222 | .133 | .700 | 2.5 | 0.8 | 0.1 | 0.4 | 1.7 |
| Ryan Anderson* | 15 | 8 | 18.5 | .317 | .206 | .786 | 3.0 | 1.1 | 0.2 | 0.1 | 3.7 |
| Trevor Ariza* | 26 | 26 | 34.0 | .379 | .360 | .837 | 5.6 | 3.3 | 1.5 | 0.3 | 9.9 |
| Deandre Ayton | 71 | 70 | 30.7 | .585 | .000 | .746 | 10.3 | 1.8 | 0.9 | 0.9 | 16.3 |
| Dragan Bender | 46 | 27 | 18.0 | .447 | .218 | .593 | 4.0 | 1.2 | 0.4 | 0.5 | 5.0 |
| Devin Booker | 64 | 64 | 35.0 | .467 | .326 | .878 | 4.1 | 6.8 | 0.9 | 0.2 | 26.6 |
| Mikal Bridges | 82 | 56 | 29.5 | .430 | .335 | .805 | 3.2 | 2.1 | 1.6 | 0.5 | 8.3 |
| Isaiah Canaan* | 19 | 15 | 26.5 | .395 | .347 | .750 | 2.6 | 3.3 | 0.6 | 0.0 | 7.5 |
| Tyson Chandler* | 7 | 0 | 12.7 | .667 | — | .556 | 5.6 | 0.9 | 0.3 | 0.1 | 3.7 |
| Jamal Crawford | 64 | 0 | 18.9 | .397 | .332 | .845 | 1.3 | 3.6 | 0.5 | 0.2 | 7.9 |
| Troy Daniels | 51 | 1 | 14.9 | .411 | .381 | .783 | 1.4 | 0.5 | 0.5 | 0.1 | 6.2 |
| Jawun Evans* | 7 | 0 | 9.1 | .231 | .000 | — | 1.7 | 1.4 | 0.4 | 0.0 | 0.9 |
| Jimmer Fredette | 6 | 0 | 10.8 | .276 | .000 | 1.000 | 1.2 | 1.3 | 0.5 | 0.0 | 3.7 |
| Richaun Holmes | 70 | 4 | 16.9 | .608 | — | .731 | 4.7 | 0.9 | 0.6 | 1.1 | 8.2 |
| Josh Jackson | 79 | 29 | 25.2 | .413 | .324 | .671 | 4.4 | 2.3 | 0.9 | 0.7 | 11.5 |
| Tyler Johnson* | 13 | 12 | 31.2 | .368 | .321 | .872 | 4.0 | 4.2 | 1.1 | 0.5 | 11.1 |
| George King | 1 | 0 | 6.0 | — | — | — | 1.0 | 0.0 | 0.0 | 0.0 | 0.0 |
| De'Anthony Melton | 50 | 31 | 19.7 | .391 | .305 | .750 | 2.7 | 3.2 | 1.4 | 0.5 | 5.0 |
| Eric Moreland* | 1 | 0 | 5.0 | — | — | — | 3.0 | 0.0 | 0.0 | 0.0 | 0.0 |
| Élie Okobo | 53 | 16 | 18.1 | .393 | .295 | .787 | 1.8 | 2.4 | 0.6 | 0.1 | 5.7 |
| Kelly Oubre Jr.* | 40 | 12 | 29.5 | .453 | .325 | .761 | 4.9 | 1.6 | 1.4 | 1.0 | 16.9 |
| Ray Spalding* | 13 | 3 | 11.3 | .532 | .000 | .333 | 3.7 | 0.4 | 0.7 | 0.6 | 4.2 |
| Emanuel Terry* | 2 | 0 | 10.0 | .667 | — | .500 | 3.0 | 0.5 | 1.5 | 0.0 | 4.5 |
| T. J. Warren | 43 | 36 | 31.6 | .486 | .428 | .815 | 4.0 | 1.5 | 1.2 | 0.7 | 18.0 |

* – Stats with the Suns.

== Awards and records ==
- On May 15, 2018, the Suns won their first#1 pick in franchise history after having the best odds by finishing last place in the previous season.
- On July 17, 2018, top selection Deandre Ayton was named a member of the All-Summer League Second Team for consistent performances over four games played.
- On September 7, 2018, former Suns players Charlie Scott, Jason Kidd, Steve Nash, and Grant Hill (as well as former Suns president Rick Welts) were inducted into the Naismith Basketball Hall of Fame and the most players from one NBA team to be inducted into the Basketball Hall of Fame in a single year.
- On April 6, 2019, former Suns player and coach Paul Westphal was one of twelve inductees announced as the next Naismith Memorial Basketball Hall of Fame members.

=== Awards ===
- On May 21, 2019, Deandre Ayton was named a member of the NBA All-Rookie First Team. Ayton was also named a nominee for the NBA Rookie of the Year Award for the 2019 NBA Awards show.

==== All-Star ====
- Deandre Ayton was named a member of the World Team, representing his home country of the Bahamas, for the Rising Stars Challenge on January 29, 2019.
- Devin Booker was named one of ten players competing in the Three-Point Contest on February 5, 2019.

=== Records ===
- The Suns scored 19 three-pointers in their 121–100 win over the Dallas Mavericks on October 17, 2018, tying an NBA record for most three-pointers made on a team's opening night game.
- Devin Booker scored 35 points and 7 assists game in the team's season opener, joining Michael Jordan and LeBron James as the only players 21 and younger to record five or more games with those numbers or greater.
- Through the first 11 games of the regular season, Deandre Ayton became the first rookie since Terry Cummings to record averages of at least 10 points, 10 rebounds, and 3 assists per game. In addition, Ayton recorded the highest number of rebounds for a rookie since Tim Duncan with 119 and the most assists for a rookie center since former Suns center Alvan Adams with 35.
- On January 24, 2019, Devin Booker became the fifth youngest player in league history to reach over 5,000 points throughout their careers, being behind only LeBron James, Kevin Durant, Carmelo Anthony, and Dwight Howard.
- On March 6, 2019, Devin Booker became the youngest player in league history to record 500 three-pointers, breaking a record previously set by D'Angelo Russell earlier this season.
- Devin Booker was the seventh player in NBA history to record consecutive 50+ points accomplished in games on March 25 and 27.
- At the season finale, Jamal Crawford at 39 years of age became the oldest player in NBA history to record 50 or more points in a game, breaking a record previously held by Michael Jordan at 38 years old. He also became the highest scoring bench player in a single NBA game, breaking a record previously set by Nick Anderson, as well as became the first player in league history to record 50-point games with four different teams.

=== Team records ===
- Devin Booker was the youngest player in franchise history to reach 5,000 career points with the team, breaking through that mark in only his fourth season on January 24, 2019 against the Portland Trail Blazers. However, he was actually the second-fastest player in the franchise to reach that mark at 245, being behind only Walter Davis at 215 games.
- On March 16, 2019, Devin Booker broke Gail Goodrich's team record for most games where 35+ points, 5+ rebounds, and 5+ assists were recorded for the franchise with 9 total games.
- On March 25, 2019, Devin Booker broke Connie Hawkins' franchise record of 12 games scoring 35 or more points in a season, earning his thirteenth in a loss to the Utah Jazz where he scored 59 points.
  - He also became the only Suns player to record consecutive 50+ point games on March 27. Furthermore, he also leads all players in franchise history to record 50+ point games with the Suns.
- On March 27, 2019, Deandre Ayton broke Alvan Adams' franchise record for the most double-doubles recorded in a rookie season.

=== Milestones ===
- Trevor Ariza overtook fellow teammate Ryan Anderson with five three-pointers over nothing from Anderson for 41st place in career three-point scoring in their season debut 121–100 win over the Dallas Mavericks on October 17, 2018.
- Tyson Chandler overtook former Suns player Shawn Marion for 37th highest number of career rebounds with eight rebounds in a loss to the Denver Nuggets on October 20, 2018.
- Trevor Ariza tied Hall of Famer Mitch Richmond with two three-pointers to become the 40th best three-point shooter in NBA history in a blowout loss to the San Antonio Spurs on October 31, 2018.
  - Ariza then made two more three-pointers in a loss to the Toronto Raptors just two days later on November 2 to become the sole holder of that position.
- After tying Mitch Richmond's position a week earlier, Trevor Ariza tied Baron Davis' spot with two three-pointers for 39th place in career three-point scoring in a blowout loss to the Brooklyn Nets on November 6, 2018.
  - Trevor then became the sole holder of that spot two days later with three 3-pointers in an overtime loss to the Boston Celtics on November 8.
- Trevor Ariza tied Jerome Kersey as the 50th best ball stealer in NBA history with two steals in a win over the Milwaukee Bucks on November 23, 2018.
  - He then became the sole holder of that spot afterward two days later with three steals against the Detroit Pistons.
- Trevor Ariza tied Hall of Famer Ray Allen as the 49th best ball stealer in NBA history with four steals in a blowout loss to the Los Angeles Lakers on December 2, 2018.
  - He soon became the sole holder of that spot afterward with three steals in a blowout loss to the Sacramento Kings two days later.
- Trevor Ariza tied Phoenix Suns Ring of Honor member Dan Majerle to become the 37th best three-point shooter in league history, with only one of those shots made in an overtime loss to the Los Angeles Clippers on December 10, 2018.
  - Ariza then surpassed both Dan Majerle and Carmelo Anthony on the list with three 3-pointers made three days to become the 36th best three-point shooter in NBA history in a win over the Dallas Mavericks on December 13, 2018, his last game played with the Suns. He was also one steal away from tying Michael Ray Richardson on the most steals list before being traded to the Washington Wizards on December 17 after previously being inactive for being discussed as a part of a three team trade including the Memphis Grizzlies on December 15.

=== Team milestones ===
- After finishing their second-worst season in franchise history (at the time), the Suns won their first#1 pick in franchise history.
- In the season-opening game, Devin Booker overtook Hall of Fame guard Dennis Johnson to become the Suns' 26th best all-time scorer by making a three-pointer at 3:32 near the end of the game in a 121–100 win over the Dallas Mavericks on October 17, 2018. Booker finished the night with 35 points, the highest amount for a Suns player in the team's season opener since Kevin Johnson in 1995. He also placed 9th in the franchise's history for most three-point shots made for the team, besting Goran Dragić's spot on the team.
- In the next game, Booker tied former point guard Kyle Macy for the 25th best all-time scorer for the Suns with 25 points scored in a loss to the Denver Nuggets. He later overtook Macy two days later against the Golden State Warriors in the first two minutes of the game. Booker also overtook former point guard Stephon Marbury to become the franchise's 25th best all-time scorer and finished the game with 28 points in a 123–103 loss to the Warriors. Booker then overtook former teammate Eric Bledsoe to become the 24th best all-time scorer for the Suns in the next game.
- On October 24, 2018, Booker became the team's 8th highest three-point scorer in franchise history, beating out Wesley Person's time with the franchise.
- For Deandre Ayton's first 11 games of the regular season, the 35 assists were the highest by a rookie center for any player since former Suns center Alvan Adams.
- On November 14, 2018, Booker overtook Hall of Fame guard Grant Hill to become the 23rd best all-time scorer for the Suns, scoring 13 points alongside a career-high 12 assists in a 116–96 win over the San Antonio Spurs.
- On January 24, 2019, Booker became the 18th player in franchise history to reach the 5,000 point barrier with the Suns.

== Injuries/Personal missed games ==
| Player | Duration | | Reason for missed time | Games missed |
| Player | Start | End | Reason for missed time | Games missed |
|---|---|---|---|---|
| Troy Daniels | October 19, 2018 | October 27, 2018 | Failed a concussion protocol | 3 |
| Devin Booker | October 24, 2018 | November 2, 2018 | Strained hamstring | 3 |
| Isaiah Canaan | October 30, 2018 | November 2, 2018 | Sprained ankle | 1 |
| T. J. Warren | November 4, 2018 | November 6, 2018 | Lower back spasms | 1 |
| Trevor Ariza | November 14, 2018 | November 19, 2018 | Personal reasons | 2 |
| Devin Booker | November 30, 2018 | December 2, 2018 | Left toe injury | 1 |
| T. J. Warren | November 30, 2018 | December 10, 2018 | Right ankle injury | 5 |
| Devin Booker | December 2, 2018 | December 15, 2018 | Strained left hamstring | 6 |
| Richaun Holmes | December 31, 2018 | January 2, 2019 | Flu | 1 |
| Devin Booker | January 6, 2019 | January 15, 2019 | Lower back spasms | 3 |
| Jamal Crawford | January 12, 2019 | January 20, 2019 | Personal reasons / Sore left knee | 4 |
| Richaun Holmes | January 20, 2019 | January 27, 2019 | Right foot sprain | 4 |
| Deandre Ayton | January 20, 2019 | February 2, 2019 | Left ankle sprain | 6 |
| T. J. Warren | January 24, 2019 | Did not return | Sore right ankle | 33 |
| De'Anthony Melton | January 25, 2019 | February 23, 2019 | Right ankle sprain | 10 |
| Dragan Bender | February 2, 2019 | February 8, 2019 | Right thumb sprain | 3 |
| Devin Booker | February 4, 2019 | February 10, 2019 | Right hamstring tightness | 3 |
| Tyler Johnson | March 15, 2019 | Did not return | Sore right knee | 13 |
| Richaun Holmes | March 16, 2019 | March 21, 2019 | Strained right quadriceps | 2 |
| Kelly Oubre Jr. | March 18, 2019 | Did not return | Strained left thumb | 11 |
| Josh Jackson | March 22, 2019 | March 30, 2019 | Sprained right ankle | 3 |
| Richaun Holmes | March 30, 2019 | April 1, 2019 | Migraine | 1 |
| Deandre Ayton | March 30, 2019 | Did not return | Sprained left ankle | 5 |
| Devin Booker | April 3, 2019 | Did not return | Twisted left ankle | 3 |
| Richaun Holmes | April 3, 2019 | Did not return | Sprained left ankle | 3 |

== Transactions ==
=== Trades ===
June 21, 2018
To Phoenix Suns

Draft rights to (United States) Mikal Bridges (#10)

To Philadelphia 76ers

Draft rights to (United States) Zhaire Smith (#16)
2021 first-round pick (from Miami)

July 20, 2018
To Phoenix Suns

(United States) Darrell Arthur

To Brooklyn Nets

(United States) Jared Dudley
2021 Top-35 protected second-round pick

July 20, 2018
To Phoenix Suns

(United States) Richaun Holmes

To Philadelphia 76ers

Cash Considerations

August 31, 2018
To Phoenix Suns

(United States) Ryan Anderson
(United States) De'Anthony Melton

To Houston Rockets

(United States) Brandon Knight
(United States) Marquese Chriss

December 17, 2018
To Phoenix Suns

(United States) Kelly Oubre Jr.
(United States) Austin Rivers

To Washington Wizards

(United States) Trevor Ariza

February 6, 2019
To Phoenix Suns

(United States) Tyler Johnson
(United States) Wayne Ellington
$1.8 million traded player exception

To Miami Heat

(United States) Ryan Anderson

I: The Brooklyn Nets only got Phoenix's 2021 second-round pick if the Suns didn't have that pick in the top 35 in terms of selections that season. Otherwise, the Suns were originally meant to keep that selection if it was inside that protection before a later trade with the Memphis Grizzlies (made under James Jones' guise as general manager going forward) resulted in it going to them in that event instead. However, with the Suns' vastly improved success from this season until that point in time, their second-round pick went to Brooklyn instead of Memphis with no reservations whatsoever.

=== Free agents ===
==== Re-signed ====
| Player | Signed | Date |
|---|---|---|
| Devin Booker | Signed 5-year maximum contract extension for $158 million | July 7, 2018 |

==== Additions ====
| Player | Signed | Former team(s) |
|---|---|---|
| Trevor Ariza | Signed 1-year deal for $15,000,000 | Houston Rockets |
| Isaiah Canaan | Signed 1-year non-guaranteed deal for $1,757,429 | Phoenix Suns (Previously waived on February 8, 2018) |
| Jamal Crawford | Signed 1-year deal for $2,393,887 | Minnesota Timberwolves |
| Jawun Evans | Signed a two-way contract for around $77,250 | Los Angeles Clippers / Northern Arizona Suns |
| Eric Moreland | Signed 1-year non-guaranteed deal for $1,080,083 | Detroit Pistons |
| Quincy Acy | Signed two 10-day contracts worth $213,948 | Brooklyn Nets |
| Emanuel Terry | Signed a 10-day contract worth $47,370 | Sioux Falls Skyforce |
| Ray Spalding | Signed a 10-day contract / 2-year deal worth $1,601,598 | Dallas Mavericks / Texas Legends |
| Jimmer Fredette | Signed 2-year partially guaranteed deal worth $2,186,698 | (China) Shanghai Bilibili Sharks |

a: Isaiah Canaan later ended up receiving only $446,803 officially for his time spent with the team this season.
b: Isaiah Canaan was previously with the team during the 2017-18 season. However, on January 31, 2018, a gruesome leg injury forced him out of commission for the rest of the season, which lead to his agreed waiver on February 8, though he would train in Phoenix to recover along the way.
c: Jawun Evans started out the preseason with the Los Angeles Clippers before being waived by them on October 15, 2018. He then played with the Northern Arizona Suns on November 7 before signing a two-way contract with Phoenix on December 4.
d: Eric Moreland ended up receiving only $221,328 for his brief stint with the Suns.
e: Quincy Acy originally signed a 10-day contract with the Phoenix Suns on January 7, 2019. However, he received a second 10-day contract on January 17 before not signing on to a regular contract, with Phoenix giving out a new 10-day contract to Emanuel Terry instead.
f: Ray Spalding originally signed a 10-day contract worth $47,370 with Phoenix on February 20, 2019. However, despite not playing a single game for Phoenix at that time, Spalding was given a partially guaranteed deal on March 3, allowing him the full salary of $184,746 to finish off the season before potentially receiving $1,416,852 next year if it were agreed upon.
g: Ray Spalding previously played in only one game with the Dallas Mavericks (which was coincidentally the season opener against the Suns) before playing with the affiliate Texas Legends for the rest of the season and then being waived on January 31, 2019. Spalding received a total of $184,746 from Phoenix this season (including the salary earned through his 10-day contract), with his next season potentially earning him $1,416,852 as well.
h: Jimmer Fredette was given a guarantee of $198,579 throughout the rest of the season on March 22, 2019 before having a potential earning of $1,988,119 next year in the event his performances with the Suns went well this season.

==== Subtractions ====
| Player | Reason left | New team(s) |
|---|---|---|
| Danuel House Jr. | Two-way contract expired | Golden State Warriors / Rio Grande Valley Vipers / Houston Rockets |
| Tyler Ulis | Waived | Golden State Warriors / Chicago Bulls / Windy City Bulls |
| Alan Williams | Waived | Brooklyn Nets / Long Island Nets |
| Elfrid Payton | Unrestricted free agent | New Orleans Pelicans |
| Jared Dudley | Traded | Brooklyn Nets |
| Alec Peters | Two-way contract expired | (Russia) PBC CSKA Moscow |
| Oleksiy "Alex" Len | Unrestricted free agent | Atlanta Hawks |
| Brandon Knight; Marquese Chriss | Traded | Houston Rockets / Cleveland Cavaliers |
| Darrell Arthur | Waived | —N/a (Retired) |
| Shaquille Harrison | Waived | Chicago Bulls |
| Davon Reed | Waived | Indiana Pacers / Fort Wayne Mad Ants |
| Tyson Chandler | Waived / Bought out contract | Los Angeles Lakers |
| Isaiah Canaan | Waived | Minnesota Timberwolves / Milwaukee Bucks |
| Trevor Ariza | Traded | Washington Wizards |
| Austin Rivers | Waived | Houston Rockets |
| Eric Moreland | Waived | (Canada) Toronto Raptors |
| Quincy Acy | Second 10-day contract expired | Texas Legends / (China) Shenzhen New Century Leopards |
| Emanuel Terry | 10-day contract expired | Sioux Falls Skyforce / Miami Heat |
| Ryan Anderson | Traded | Miami Heat |
| Wayne Ellington | Waived | Detroit Pistons |
| Jawun Evans | Waived two-way contract | Oklahoma City Thunder |

i: Danuel House Jr. originally signed a deal with the Golden State Warriors on September 21, 2018. However, he would not stay with Golden State during the regular season. House then signed with the Rio Grande Valley Vipers on a separate deal after being waived by the Warriors before eventually signing a two-way contract with the Houston Rockets, his Summer League team this season, on December 6, 2018 after previously signing during the season with the Rockets. His contract eventually became a one-year deal with Houston on March 13, 2019 after previously disagreeing on two prior three-year deals.
j: Similarly, Tyler Ulis also signed a deal with the Golden State Warriors on September 21, 2018. He also would not stay with the Warriors for the regular season, being waived on October 12. However, Ulis signed a two-way contract with the Chicago Bulls days later, splitting time between them and their NBA G League affiliate, the Windy City Bulls, before a hip injury on December 21 forced him to miss the rest of the season, which lead to him being waived six days later.
k: Alan Williams initially signed a two-way contract with the Brooklyn Nets on September 24, 2018, but he never played in Brooklyn during that first two-way contract with them. Williams was waived on January 2, 2019, but returned with a second two-way contract nine days later, which is where he'd play a few games with Brooklyn instead of the NBA G League affiliate Long Island Nets.
l: Both Brandon Knight and Marquese Chriss were initially traded to the Houston Rockets on August 31, 2018 in exchange for Ryan Anderson and rookie De'Anthony Melton. However, both Knight and Chriss were later traded from the Rockets to the Cleveland Cavaliers by the trade deadline on February 7, 2019, where they went alongside a first round pick and a second round pick for a three-way trade also involving the Sacramento Kings.
m: While Darrell Arthur considered all of his options going forward for his personal career, he did not sign with any team either in the NBA or elsewhere in the world after being waived by Phoenix, eventually retiring from playing basketball completely sometime in either December 2020 or January 2021, due in part to the upcoming COVID-19 pandemic throughout some future seasons in the NBA after this one.
n: After being waived by the Suns in the preseason, Davon Reed signed a two-way contract with the Indiana Pacers on October 19, 2018. Throughout the season, he split his playing time between Indiana and their NBA G League affiliate, the Fort Wayne Mad Ants.
o: On November 4, 2019, Tyson Chandler agreed to waive his rights with the Suns for the rest of the season by having the team buy out his contract.
p: After being waived by the Suns, Isaiah Canaan signed two 10-day contracts with the Minnesota Timberwolves on January 30 and February 11, 2019 before signing one 10-day contract with the Milwaukee Bucks on February 25, 2019.
q: After Quincy Acy was let go from the team, he played for the Texas Legends from February 24 to March 15, 2019, where he later played for the Shenzhen New Century Leopards for one game before being replaced for the rest of the 2018–19 CBA season.
r: After Emanuel Terry's 10-day contract expired with the Suns, he returned to the Sioux Falls Skyforce on February 8, 2019, with a brief 10-day contract stint with the Miami Heat occurring from February 20 to March 1, 2019 before returning to Sioux Falls for the rest of the season.
