= 2018–19 Washington Wizards season =

NBA professional basketball team season

- Head coach: Scott Brooks
- General manager: Ernie Grunfeld (fired); Tommy Sheppard (interim)
- Owners: Ted Leonsis
- Arena: Capital One Arena

Results
- Record: 32–50 (.390)
- Place: Division: 4th (Southeast); Conference: 11th (Eastern)
- Playoff finish: Did not qualify
- Stats at Basketball Reference

Local media
- Television: NBC Sports Washington; NBC 4
- Radio: Federal News Radio; 106.7 The Fan

The 2018–19 Washington Wizards season was the 58th season of the franchise in the National Basketball Association (NBA) and 46th in the Washington, D.C., area. On March 28, 2019, they were eliminated from playoff contention after the Milwaukee Bucks' victory over the Los Angeles Clippers, missing the playoffs for the first time since 2015-16. This season would also mark the end of the John Wall era in Washington, as he played his last game as a Wizard on December 26, 2018, and would undergo a season-ending surgery on his left heel and then later an Achilles injury from slipping and falling in his home that would cause him to miss the entire 2019-20 season. Wall would get traded to the Houston Rockets for Russell Westbrook and a 2023 first round draft pick following that season. Wall was reunited with his former college teammate DeMarcus Cousins in Houston, both of whom played for the Kentucky Wildcats from 2009 to 2010. On April 2, the Wizards fired long-standing team president and general manager Ernie Grunfeld, replacing him with longtime assistant Tommy Sheppard.

== Background ==
=== Off-season ===
Shortly after the Washington Wizards exited the 2018 NBA Playoffs in late April, general manager Ernie Grunfeld was quietly granted a two-year extension for his incumbent role with the team. In May, Jason Smith exercised his player option to stay with the team. Jodie Meeks also exercised his player option nearly a month later, despite having to serve the remainder of his 25-game suspension in the 2018-19 NBA season for violating the NBA's Anti-Drug Program in April.

The Wizards made several moves over the summer to overhaul their roster. On June 27, the team traded their starting center Marcin Gortat to the Los Angeles Clippers for Austin Rivers, as both players were entering the final year of the respective contracts and were growing increasingly disgruntled with their teams. The Wizards then boosted their depth by acquiring veterans Thomas Bryant, Jeff Green and Dwight Howard in free agency. Meanwhile, the team chose not to re-sign five players whose contracts had expired and became unrestricted free agents: Mike Scott, Tim Frazier, Ty Lawson, Chris McCullough, and Ramon Sessions.

Unlike in the previous two years, the Wizards did not trade away their picks in the 2018 NBA draft. Instead, they used the draft to acquire two additional players: Troy Brown Jr., a Freshman from Oregon who traditionally played at Small Forward, was acquired with the Wizards' 15th pick in the first round. Issuf Sanon, a Ukrainian Guard, was selected with the team's 44th pick in the second round. Brown later joined the team, while Sanon was chosen as a "draft-and-stash" player, who would be allowed to continue playing with the professional Slovenian basketball team Olimpija Ljubljana while the Wizards retained his draft rights.

The Wizards rounded out their roster by signing Jordan McRae to a two-way contract, officially adding him to the team in September.

=== Capital City Go-Go ===
On August 7, 2018, the Wizards unveiled the new management team behind their first ever NBA G League franchise to be directly affiliated with the team, the Capital City Go-Go, as they were set to play their inaugural season in 2018. Pops Mensah-Bonsu was chosen as the Go-Go's general manager, and Jarell Christian as their head coach. The Go-Go also held open tryouts in September to fill the remaining spots on their roster.

=== Preseason ===
The Wizards opened their preseason with an overtime loss to the New York Knicks, 124–121. The game was notable for the combined 83 fouls, resulting in 90 shots, accumulated by both teams over the course of the game. Among those fouls, Markieff Morris was ejected in the second quarter after picking up a second technical foul from a verbal altercation with Knicks rookie Mitchell Robinson. The Wizards would later go on to win the rest of their matches in the preseason. Meanwhile, Howard stayed out of preseason play entirely, as he dealt with a recurring back injury throughout the preseason, leading to speculation he would miss the team's season opener on October 18.

As the preseason drew to a close, the Wizards made a couple additional personnel changes: On October 15, the team sent Meeks along with a future conditional second-round draft pick to the Milwaukee Bucks in a salary dump, receiving nothing more than the Bucks future conditional second-round draft pick in return. The next day, the team announced that they had hired Washington Mystics player Kristi Toliver as an assistant coach for player development.

=== October: The Season Begins ===
The Wizards opened their season at Capital One Arena against the Miami Heat. McRae was called up to fill the empty roster spot left by Meeks' departure, and Ian Mahinmi was tabbed to start in place of Howard, who was still recovering from his injury. The team ended up losing the match 113–112, thanks to a last-second shot by Kelly Olynyk. The following Saturday against the Toronto Raptors, Bradley Beal broke the Wizards' franchise record for all-time three-point shots made, surpassing Gilbert Arenas who previously held the record.

The team finally got their first win of the regular season in a close matchup with the Portland Trail Blazers on October 22, winning 125–124 in overtime thanks to some exceptional three-point shooting from Morris. However, it would be their only win in October, as the team finished the month with a 1–6 record.

=== November: Roster Shuffling and Howard's Injury ===
Howard continued to be sidelined from his injury, and the Wizards were approaching a deadline to add another active player to their roster before being penalized by the league. The team decided to sign Chasson Randle, who trained with the team in the preseason and was playing with the Go-Go, to a one-year contract. The team then assigned him back to the Go-Go in time for their season opener. The Wizards would shuffle him back and forth between the first team roster and the Go-Go before officially waiving him two weeks later.

Howard finally got his first start with the Wizards on November 2, getting 20 points in a loss to the Oklahoma City Thunder. He would go on to start at Center for nine games, leading the team in rebounding for seven of them, including the team's first winning streak between November 10–14. However, Howard's injury returned and forced him to exit the first half of the November 18 game against Portland that the team would eventually lose. Tempers reportedly flared at a team practice as members of the Wizards blamed each other, the coaching staff, and even Grunfeld for their team's woes.

Coach Scott Brooks announced a change to the starting lineup for the next game against the Los Angeles Clippers, recalling Thomas Bryant from the Go-Go shortly after he had been sent down to get playing time and putting him at the starting Center position while Howard continued to recover. He also moved Otto Porter Jr. to the Power Forward slot and put Kelly Oubre Jr. on the starting lineup in the Small Forward position, sending Morris to the bench. The change started off poorly, as the Wizards were down by 24 at one point during the first half, but the team rallied and pulled off a 125–118 victory.

Shortly after the game, the team sent down Brown to the Go-Go, and signed Okaro White to a one-year contract to avoid being penalized after waiving Randle earlier. The team shuffled White back and forth between the main roster and the Go-Go as needed to give him some playing time. Meanwhile, Brooks largely kept to his new starting lineup, sometimes giving Morris more playing time at Center than Bryant even as Bryant would open the game at that position. It was an arrangement that would continue after Howard announced he would be getting spinal surgery to heal his injury, keeping him sidelined for an additional 2–3 months. Despite being healthy enough to play at Center, Mahinmi's poor performance saw him languish on the bench, collecting DNP-CDs for most of November and December.

=== December: Desperate Trades and Loss of Wall ===
Despite reports from the previous month that the Wizards were open to any trade offers involving any player on their roster, including their star players, there seemed to be few takers around the league, as even the team's highly skilled players were considered too pricey to touch. However, in December, the team managed to successfully trade away some lower-priced players for relief. On the 7th, the team inserted itself into a three-team trade with the Cavaliers and the Bucks. The team ended up trading away Smith and "cash considerations" to the Bucks and acquired Sam Dekker from the Cavaliers in this trade.

About a week later, the team nearly pulled off another three-team trade involving themselves, the Memphis Grizzlies, and the Phoenix Suns that would see them acquire Trevor Ariza from the Suns in exchange for Austin Rivers, with Oubre going to the Grizzlies for two second round picks. However, the trade fell apart when the Grizzlies did not clarify which of MarShon Brooks or Dillon Brooks would be going to the Suns. Soon after the trade fell through, the Wizards decided to deal with the Suns directly, getting Ariza in exchange for Oubre and Rivers, who was waived by the Suns shortly after the trade was accepted. The Wizards re-signed Randle to the roster from the Go-Go to fill the spot vacated by Rivers after the trade. While the Wizards looked to remain competitive, their playoff contention hopes were dashed on December 29, when it was announced that John Wall was out for the rest of the season due to a chronic Achilles tendon injury relating to Haglund's syndrome.

=== January/February: Further turmoil and rebuilding trades ===
In spite of their hardships relating to the team around this time, which included John Wall's first surgery resulting in an infection, throughout the month of January, the Wizards performed fairly well to acquire an 8–6 record for the month without Wall. However, the Wizards were still looking for moves to help rebuild the team for the future while also trying to see if the playoffs were still possible in the Eastern Conference. On February 5, potential plans for their next season were already hindered without John Wall playing, as it was announced that Wall suffered a ruptured left Achilles tendon injury through slipping and falling down in his home. That injury would hinder his playing time for 12 months. alongside his previous injury leaving him out for the rest of this season. A day later, the Wizards also traded one of their highest paid players, Otto Porter Jr., to the Chicago Bulls in exchange for the expiring contracts of Jabari Parker and Bobby Portis, as well as a protected 2023 second round pick. At the NBA trade deadline on February 7, Washington also traded Markieff Morris and a 2021 second round pick to the New Orleans Pelicans for Wesley Johnson.

== Draft picks ==
Round	Pick	Player	Position	Nationality	College / Club
1	15	Troy Brown Jr.	SF	United States	Oregon (Fr.)
2	44	Issuf Sanon	PG	Ukraine	(Slovenia) Olimpija Ljubljana

== Roster ==
2018–19 Washington Wizards roster
Players

Pos.	No.	Player	Height	Weight	DOB	From
SF	1	Trevor Ariza	6 ft 8 in (2.03 m)	215 lb (98 kg)	1985-06-30	UCLA
SG	3	Bradley Beal	6 ft 3 in (1.91 m)	207 lb (94 kg)	1993-06-28	Florida
SF	6	Troy Jr. Brown (GL)	6 ft 7 in (2.01 m)	215 lb (98 kg)	1999-07-28	Oregon
C	13	Thomas Bryant	6 ft 10 in (2.08 m)	248 lb (112 kg)	1997-07-31	Indiana
PF	8	Sam Dekker	6 ft 9 in (2.06 m)	230 lb (104 kg)	1994-05-06	Wisconsin
PF	32	Jeff Green	6 ft 9 in (2.06 m)	235 lb (107 kg)	1986-08-28	Georgetown
C	21	Dwight Howard	6 ft 11 in (2.11 m)	265 lb (120 kg)	1985-12-08	SW Atlanta Academy (GA)
SF	4	Wesley Johnson	6 ft 7 in (2.01 m)	215 lb (98 kg)	1987-07-11	Syracuse
C	28	Ian Mahinmi	6 ft 11 in (2.11 m)	262 lb (119 kg)	1986-11-05	France
SG	52	Jordan McRae (TW)	6 ft 5 in (1.96 m)	179 lb (81 kg)	1991-03-28	Tennessee
PF	12	Jabari Parker	6 ft 8 in (2.03 m)	245 lb (111 kg)	1995-03-15	Duke
PF	5	Bobby Portis	6 ft 11 in (2.11 m)	250 lb (113 kg)	1995-02-10	Arkansas
PG	9	Chasson Randle	6 ft 3 in (1.91 m)	185 lb (84 kg)	1993-02-05	Stanford
SF	7	Devin Robinson (TW)	6 ft 8 in (2.03 m)	200 lb (91 kg)	1995-03-07	Florida
PG	31	Tomáš Satoranský	6 ft 7 in (2.01 m)	210 lb (95 kg)	1991-10-30	Czech Republic
PG	2	John Wall	6 ft 3 in (1.91 m)	210 lb (95 kg)	1990-09-06	Kentucky

Coaches
Head coach
- Scott Brooks
Assistant(s)
- Tony Brown
- Robert Pack
- Ryan Richman
- Mike Terpstra
- Maz Trakh
- Navin Hettiarachchi (strength and conditioning)

Legend
- (DP) Unsigned draft pick
- (FA) Free agent
- (S) Suspended
- (GL) On assignment to G League
- (TW) Two-way affiliate player
- Injured

Roster
Updated: April 9, 2019

== Standings ==
=== Division ===
Southeast Division	W	L	PCT	GB	Home	Road	Div	GP
y – Orlando Magic	42	40	.512	–	25‍–‍16	17‍–‍24	10–6	82
Charlotte Hornets	39	43	.476	3.0	25‍–‍16	14‍–‍27	10–6	82
Miami Heat	39	43	.476	3.0	19‍–‍22	20‍–‍21	7–9	82
Washington Wizards	32	50	.390	10.0	22‍–‍19	10‍–‍31	7–9	82
Atlanta Hawks	29	53	.354	13.0	17‍–‍24	12‍–‍29	6–10	82

=== Conference ===
Eastern Conference
#	Team	W	L	PCT	GB	GP
1	z – Milwaukee Bucks *	60	22	.732	–	82
2	y – Toronto Raptors *	58	24	.707	2.0	82
3	x – Philadelphia 76ers	51	31	.622	9.0	82
4	x – Boston Celtics	49	33	.598	11.0	82
5	x – Indiana Pacers	48	34	.585	12.0	82
6	x – Brooklyn Nets	42	40	.512	18.0	82
7	y – Orlando Magic *	42	40	.512	18.0	82
8	x – Detroit Pistons	41	41	.500	19.0	82
9	Charlotte Hornets	39	43	.476	21.0	82
10	Miami Heat	39	43	.476	21.0	82
11	Washington Wizards	32	50	.390	28.0	82
12	Atlanta Hawks	29	53	.354	31.0	82
13	Chicago Bulls	22	60	.268	38.0	82
14	Cleveland Cavaliers	19	63	.232	41.0	82
15	New York Knicks	17	65	.207	43.0	82

== Game log ==
=== Preseason ===
2018 preseason game log
Total: 4–1 (Home: 2–1; Road: 2–0)
Preseason: 4–1 (home: 2–1; road: 2–0)

Game	Date	Team	Score	High points	High rebounds	High assists	Location Attendance	Record
1	October 1	New York	L 121–124 (OT)	Kelly Oubre Jr. (15)	Kelly Oubre Jr. (8)	Oubre Jr., Randle (4)	Capital One Arena; 11,826	0–1
2	October 5	Miami	W 121–114	Bradley Beal (20)	Markieff Morris (10)	John Wall (9)	Capital One Arena; 12,825	1–1
3	October 8	@ New York	W 110–98	Bradley Beal (20)	Porter, Wall, Bryant, Smith (6)	John Wall (9)	Madison Square Garden; 19,763	2–1
4	October 10	@ Detroit	W 102–97	John Wall (32)	Markieff Morris (7)	John Wall (9)	Little Caesars Arena; 9,117	3–1
5	October 12	Guangzhou Long-Lions	W 140–111	Devin Robinson (23)	Troy Brown Jr. (8)	Austin Rivers (5)	Capital One Arena; 10,907	4–1

2018–19 season schedule

=== Regular season ===
2018–19 game log
Total: 32–50 (Home: 22–19; Road: 10–31)
October: 1–6 (home: 0–2; road: 1–4)

Game	Date	Team	Score	High points	High rebounds	High assists	Location Attendance	Record
1	October 18	Miami	L 112–113	John Wall (26)	Otto Porter Jr. (11)	John Wall (9)	Capital One Arena; 20,409	0–1
2	October 20	Toronto	L 113–117	Bradley Beal (32)	Markieff Morris (7)	Beal, John Wall (6)	Capital One Arena; 16,185	0–2
3	October 22	@ Portland	W 125–124 (OT)	Markieff Morris (28)	Otto Porter Jr. (10)	John Wall (9)	Moda Center; 19,187	1–2
4	October 24	@ Golden State	L 122–144	Bradley Beal (23)	Morris, Smith, Oubre Jr., Bryant (4)	John Wall (6)	Oracle Arena; 19,596	1–3
5	October 26	@ Sacramento	L 112–116	John Wall (26)	Oubre Jr., Porter Jr. (9)	John Wall (8)	Golden 1 Center; 14,101	1–4
6	October 28	@ LA Clippers	L 104–136	Bradley Beal (20)	Jeff Green (8)	John Wall (5)	Staples Center; 16,491	1–5
7	October 30	@ Memphis	L 95–107	John Wall (22)	Porter Jr., Mahinmi (6)	Beal, John Wall (7)	FedExForum; 14,106	1–6

November : 7–8 (home: 6–3; road: 1–5)

Game	Date	Team	Score	High points	High rebounds	High assists	Location Attendance	Record
8	November 2	Oklahoma City	L 111–134	Bradley Beal (27)	Austin Rivers (5)	John Wall (9)	Capital One Arena; 20,409	1–7
9	November 4	New York	W 108–95	John Wall (26)	Dwight Howard (10)	John Wall (7)	Capital One Arena; 16,679	2–7
10	November 6	@ Dallas	L 100–119	John Wall (24)	Dwight Howard (11)	John Wall (10)	American Airlines Center; 19,234	2–8
11	November 9	@ Orlando	L 108–117	Bradley Beal (27)	Dwight Howard (8)	John Wall (12)	Amway Center; 16,562	2–9
12	November 10	@ Miami	W 116–110	John Wall (28)	Dwight Howard (16)	John Wall (9)	American Airlines Arena; 19,600	3–9
13	November 12	Orlando	W 117–109	John Wall (25)	Morris, Howard (8)	John Wall (10)	Capital One Arena; 15,346	4–9
14	November 14	Cleveland	W 119–95	Bradley Beal (20)	Oubre Jr., Howard, Mahinmi (8)	John Wall (9)	Capital One Arena; 14,537	5–9
15	November 16	Brooklyn	L 104–115	Dwight Howard (25)	Dwight Howard (17)	John Wall (7)	Capital One Arena; 15,102	5–10
16	November 18	Portland	L 109–119	John Wall (24)	Jeff Green (13)	Tomas Satoransky (7)	Capital One Arena; 16,647	5–11
17	November 20	LA Clippers	W 125–118	John Wall (30)	Otto Porter Jr. (14)	John Wall (8)	Capital One Arena; 14,499	6–11
18	November 23	@ Toronto	L 107–125	Bradley Beal (20)	Dwight Howard (8)	John Wall (11)	Scotiabank Arena; 19,800	6–12
19	November 24	New Orleans	W 124–114	Otto Porter Jr. (29)	Markieff Morris (9)	Wall, Beal (8)	Capital One Arena; 15,165	7–12
20	November 26	Houston	W 135–131 (OT)	John Wall (36)	Markieff Morris (10)	John Wall (11)	Capital One Arena; 16,872	8–12
21	November 28	@ New Orleans	L 104–125	Porter Jr., Morris (22)	Markieff Morris (9)	John Wall (11)	Smoothie King Center; 13,570	8–13
22	November 30	@ Philadelphia	L 98–123	Bradley Beal (19)	Bryant, Morris (7)	John Wall (7)	Wells Fargo Center; 20,400	8–14

December : 6–9 (home: 4–2; road: 2–7)

Game	Date	Team	Score	High points	High rebounds	High assists	Location Attendance	Record
23	December 1	Brooklyn	W 102–88	John Wall (30)	Otto Porter Jr. (11)	John Wall (9)	Capital One Arena; 15,448	9–14
24	December 3	@ New York	W 110–107	Bradley Beal (27)	Bradley Beal (8)	John Wall (15)	Madison Square Garden; 19,440	10–14
25	December 5	@ Atlanta	W 131–117	Bradley Beal (36)	Otto Porter Jr. (11)	Bradley Beal (9)	State Farm Arena; 12,551	11–14
26	December 8	@ Cleveland	L 101–116	Bradley Beal (27)	Otto Porter Jr. (11)	John Wall (6)	Quicken Loans Arena; 19,432	11–15
27	December 10	@ Indiana	L 101–109	Bradley Beal (30)	Markieff Morris (7)	Austin Rivers (4)	Bankers Life Fieldhouse; 14,645	11–16
28	December 12	Boston	L 125–130 (OT)	John Wall (34)	Jeff Green (10)	John Wall (13)	Capital One Arena; 20,409	11–17
29	December 14	@ Brooklyn	L 118–125	Bradley Beal (31)	Kelly Oubre Jr. (6)	John Wall (13)	Barclays Center; 13,232	11–18
30	December 16	LA Lakers	W 128–110	John Wall (40)	Bradley Beal (12)	John Wall (14)	Capital One Arena; 20,409	12–18
31	December 18	@ Atlanta	L 110–118	Bradley Beal (29)	Bradley Beal (10)	John Wall (6)	State Farm Arena; 16,489	12–19
32	December 19	@ Houston	L 118–136	Bradley Beal (28)	Trevor Ariza (6)	John Wall (12)	Toyota Center; 18,055	12–20
33	December 22	Phoenix	W 149–146 (3OT)	Bradley Beal (40)	Thomas Bryant (13)	Bradley Beal (15)	Capital One Arena; 16,571	13–20
34	December 23	@ Indiana	L 89–105	Markieff Morris (16)	Thomas Bryant (7)	Wall, Beal (5)	Bankers Life Fieldhouse; 17,923	13–21
35	December 26	@ Detroit	L 95–106	Wall, Beal (21)	John Wall (7)	John Wall (8)	Little Caesars Arena; 17,534	13–22
36	December 28	Chicago	L 92–101	Bradley Beal (34)	Thomas Bryant (8)	Bradley Beal (5)	Capital One Arena; 20,409	13–23
37	December 29	Charlotte	W 130–126	Trevor Ariza (24)	Thomas Bryant (10)	Trevor Ariza (9)	Capital One Arena; 17,197	14–23

January : 8–6 (home: 6–2; road: 2–4)

Game	Date	Team	Score	High points	High rebounds	High assists	Location Attendance	Record
38	January 2	Atlanta	W 114–98	Bradley Beal (24)	Thomas Bryant (15)	Tomas Satoransky (7)	Capital One Arena; 15,324	15–23
39	January 4	@ Miami	L 109–115	Bradley Beal (33)	Bradley Beal (9)	Bradley Beal (7)	American Airlines Arena; 15,324	15–24
40	January 6	@ Oklahoma City	W 116–98	Bradley Beal (25)	Ian Mahinmi (10)	Bradley Beal (6)	Chesapeake Energy Arena; 18,203	16–24
41	January 8	@ Philadelphia	L 115–132	Bradley Beal (28)	Trevor Ariza (9)	Ian Mahinmi (5)	Wells Fargo Center; 20,446	16–25
42	January 9	Philadelphia	W 123–106	Bradley Beal (34)	Ian Mahinmi (8)	Tomas Satoransky (11)	Capital One Arena; 18,039	17–25
43	January 11	Milwaukee	W 113–106	Bradley Beal (32)	Tomas Satoransky (12)	Tomas Satoransky (10)	Capital One Arena; 17,966	18–25
44	January 13	Toronto	L 138–140 (2OT)	Bradley Beal (43)	Thomas Bryant (11)	Bradley Beal (15)	Capital One Arena; 16,919	18–26
45	January 17	New York	W 101–100	Bradley Beal (26)	Otto Porter Jr. (11)	Trevor Ariza (7)	The O2 Arena; 19,078	19–26
46	January 21	Detroit	W 101–87	Trevor Ariza (20)	Bryant, Ariza (12)	Tomas Satoransky (8)	Capital One Arena; 16,229	20–26
47	January 24	Golden State	L 118–126	Trevor Ariza (27)	Bradley Beal (10)	Tomas Satoransky (10)	Capital One Arena; 20,409	20–27
48	January 25	@ Orlando	W 95–91	Bradley Beal (27)	Trevor Ariza (7)	Tomas Satoransky (8)	Amway Center; 17,216	21–27
49	January 27	@ San Antonio	L 119–132	Beal, Satoransky (21)	Thomas Bryant (10)	Tomas Satoransky (8)	AT&T Center; 18,354	21–28
50	January 29	@ Cleveland	L 113–116	Bradley Beal (31)	Thomas Bryant (8)	Beal, Satoransky (7)	Quicken Loans Arena; 19,432	21–29
51	January 30	Indiana	W 107–89	Bradley Beal (25)	Sam Dekker (9)	Beal, Satoransky, Green (6)	Capital One Arena; 15,354	22–29

February : 3–7 (home: 1–3; road: 2–4)

Game	Date	Team	Score	High points	High rebounds	High assists	Location Attendance	Record
52	February 2	Milwaukee	L 115–131	Bradley Beal (24)	Sam Dekker (8)	Tomas Satoransky (6)	Capital One Arena; 20,409	22–30
53	February 4	Atlanta	L 129–137	Bradley Beal (27)	Otto Porter Jr. (8)	Tomas Satoransky (9)	Capital One Arena; 15,025	22–31
54	February 6	@ Milwaukee	L 129–148	Bradley Beal (30)	Thomas Bryant (14)	Tomas Satoransky (10)	Fiserv Forum; 17,360	22–32
55	February 8	Cleveland	W 119–106	Bobby Portis (30)	Jabari Parker (11)	Bradley Beal (13)	Capital One Arena; 16,682	23–32
56	February 9	@ Chicago	W 134–125	Bradley Beal (31)	Bobby Portis (12)	Tomas Satoransky (11)	United Center; 19,942	24–32
57	February 11	@ Detroit	L 112–121	Bradley Beal (32)	Thomas Bryant (8)	Bradley Beal (10)	Little Caesars Arena; 15,246	24–33
58	February 13	@ Toronto	L 120–129	Bradley Beal (28)	Jabari Parker (9)	Bradley Beal (11)	Scotiabank Arena; 19,800	24–34
59	February 22	@ Charlotte	L 110–123	Bradley Beal (46)	Bobby Portis (12)	Bradley Beal (7)	Spectrum Center; 15,572	24–35
60	February 23	Indiana	L 112–119	Bradley Beal (35)	Thomas Bryant (12)	Trevor Ariza (7)	Capital One Arena; 19,648	24–36
61	February 27	@ Brooklyn	W 125–116	Trevor Ariza (23)	Bobby Portis (12)	Tomas Satoransky (10)	Barclays Center; 13,683	25–36

March : 7–10 (home: 5–4; road: 2–6)

Game	Date	Team	Score	High points	High rebounds	High assists	Location Attendance	Record
62	March 1	@ Boston	L 96–107	Bradley Beal (29)	Beal, Portis (11)	Bradley Beal (6)	TD Garden; 18,624	25–37
63	March 3	Minnesota	W 135–121	Bobby Portis (26)	Bobby Portis (12)	Bradley Beal (8)	Capital One Arena; 17,869	26–37
64	March 6	Dallas	W 132–123	Bradley Beal (30)	Jabari Parker (9)	Tomas Satoransky (11)	Capital One Arena; 16,867	27–37
65	March 8	@ Charlotte	L 111–112	Bradley Beal (15)	Satoransky, Portis (9)	Bradley Beal (7)	Spectrum Center; 18,144	27–38
66	March 9	@ Minnesota	L 130–135 (OT)	Bradley Beal (36)	Bobby Portis (12)	Tomas Satoransky (11)	Target Center; 14,381	27–39
67	March 11	Sacramento	W 121–115	Bradley Beal (27)	Bobby Portis (13)	Bradley Beal (9)	Capital One Arena; 15,012	28–39
68	March 13	Orlando	W 100–90	Bradley Beal (23)	Thomas Bryant (10)	Beal, Satoransky (7)	Capital One Arena; 15,107	29–39
69	March 15	Charlotte	L 110–116	Bradley Beal (40)	Jabari Parker (11)	Beal, Ariza (5)	Capital One Arena; 19,520	29–40
70	March 16	Memphis	W 135–128	Bradley Beal (40)	Jabari Parker (11)	Beal, Satoransky (7)	Capital One Arena; 19,750	30–40
71	March 18	Utah	L 95–116	Jabari Parker (19)	Jabari Parker (7)	Tomas Satoransky (6)	Capital One Arena; 15,637	30–41
72	March 20	@ Chicago	L 120–126 (OT)	Bradley Beal (27)	Troy Brown Jr. (10)	Beal, Satoransky (7)	United Center; 19,470	30–42
73	March 21	Denver	L 108–113	Bradley Beal (25)	Parker, Bryant, Portis (8)	Tomas Satoransky (10)	Capital One Arena; 15,986	30–43
74	March 23	Miami	L 108–113	Jeff Green (25)	Bryant, Portis (11)	Tomas Satoransky (8)	Capital One Arena; 20,409	30–44
75	March 26	@ LA Lakers	L 106–124	Bradley Beal (32)	Bobby Portis (7)	Tomas Satoransky (11)	Staples Center; 18,997	30–45
76	March 27	@ Phoenix	W 124–121	Bradley Beal (28)	Thomas Bryant (19)	Bradley Beal (4)	Talking Stick Resort Arena; 16,004	31–45
77	March 29	@ Utah	L 124–128	Bradley Beal (34)	Bobby Portis (13)	Tomas Satoransky (9)	Vivint Smart Home Arena; 18,306	31–46
78	March 31	@ Denver	W 95–90	Troy Brown Jr. (24)	Thomas Bryant (14)	Jordan McRae (7)	Pepsi Center; 17,356	32–46

April : 0–4 (home: 0–3; road: 0–1)

Game	Date	Team	Score	High points	High rebounds	High assists	Location Attendance	Record
79	April 3	Chicago	L 114–115	Portis, Bryant (14)	Thomas Bryant (12)	McRae, Bryant (5)	Capital One Arena; 16,616	32–47
80	April 5	San Antonio	L 112–129	Bradley Beal (25)	Bobby Portis (9)	Bradley Beal (5)	Capital One Arena; 20,409	32–48
81	April 7	@ N. Y. Knicks	L 110–113	Jeff Green (19)	Bobby Portis (10)	Tomas Satoransky (7)	Madison Square Garden; 19,812	32–49
82	April 9	Boston	L 110–116	Tomas Satoransky (19)	Ian Mahinmi (12)	Tomas Satoransky (5)	Capital One Arena; 20,409	32–50

2018–19 season schedule

== Player statistics ==
Player	Pos.	GP	GS	MP	Reb.	Ast.	Stl.	Blk.	Pts.
Trevor Ariza^{≠}	SF	43	43	1,465	226	165	53	13	605
Ron Baker^{‡}	SG	4	0	45	4	2	1	1	0
Bradley Beal	SG	82	82	3,028	411	448	121	58	2,099
Troy Brown	SF	52	10	730	145	80	21	5	248
Thomas Bryant	C	72	53	1,496	454	92	25	67	758
Sam Dekker^{≠}	PF	38	0	619	115	37	27	7	230
Jeff Green	PF	77	44	2,097	309	137	43	39	946
Dwight Howard	C	9	9	230	83	4	7	4	115
John Jenkins^{≠}	SG	4	0	14	1	1	0	0	6
Wesley Johnson^{≠}	SF	12	0	157	18	7	2	5	33
Ian Mahinmi	C	34	6	498	128	25	25	16	139
Jordan McRae	SG	27	0	333	40	30	13	7	160
Markieff Morris^{†}	PF	34	15	883	174	60	25	20	391
Kelly Oubre^{†}	SF	29	7	755	129	20	27	20	373
Jabari Parker^{≠}	PF	25	0	682	180	68	23	16	374
Gary Payton^{≠}	PG	3	0	16	2	4	3	1	11
Otto Porter^{†}	SF	41	28	1,191	231	80	64	22	518
Bobby Portis^{≠}	PF	28	22	768	242	43	24	12	400
Chasson Randle^{‡}	PG	49	2	743	56	97	25	3	271
Austin Rivers^{†}	SG	29	2	683	71	58	18	10	210
Devin Robinson	SF	7	0	95	20	6	4	6	47
Tomáš Satoranský	PG	80	54	2,164	279	399	82	13	709
Jason Smith^{†}	C	12	1	130	37	12	1	5	44
John Wall	PG	32	32	1,104	116	279	49	29	663
Okaro White^{‡}	PF	3	0	6	2	0	0	0	0

After all games.
^{‡}Waived during the season
^{†}Traded during the season
^{≠}Acquired during the season

== Transactions ==
=== Trades ===
June 27, 2018	To Washington Wizards Austin Rivers	To Los Angeles Clippers Marcin Gortat	
October 15, 2018	To Washington Wizards 2020 protected second round pick	To Milwaukee Bucks Jodie Meeks; 2020 protected second round pick Cash considerations	
December 7, 2018	To Washington Wizards Sam Dekker	To Milwaukee Bucks George Hill; Jason Smith; 2021 second round pick (from Cleveland); Cash considerations (from Washington)	To Cleveland Cavaliers Matthew Dellavedova; John Henson; 2021 first and second round picks (from Milwaukee)
December 15, 2018	To Washington Wizards Trevor Ariza	To Phoenix Suns Kelly Oubre Jr. Austin Rivers	
February 6, 2019	To Washington Wizards Jabari Parker; Bobby Portis; 2023 protected second round draft pick	To Chicago Bulls Otto Porter Jr.	
February 7, 2019	To Washington Wizards Wesley Johnson	To New Orleans Pelicans Markieff Morris; 2023 second round draft pick	

=== Free Agents ===
==== Additions ====
Player	Date Signed	Contract	Former Team	Ref.
Thomas Bryant	July 2, 2018	2 years, $2,193,857	Los Angeles Lakers	
Jeff Green	July 10, 2018	1 year, $2,393,887	Cleveland Cavaliers	
Dwight Howard	July 11, 2018	2 years, $10,940,850 (MLE)	Brooklyn Nets (Note: Howard played with the Charlotte Hornets through 2018, and was officially traded to the Brooklyn Nets on July 6, 2018, but waived later that same day.)	
Jordan McRae	September 10, 2018	Two-way contract	(Spain) Saski Baskonia	
Chasson Randle	October 30, 2018 (Note: Randle was officially waived by the team on November 12 and rejoined the Go-Go on November 15. However, he officially re-signed with the Wizards on December 18)	1 year, $1,242,652	Capital City Go-Go	
Okaro White	November 23, 2018	1 year	Cleveland Cavaliers	
Ron Baker	December 21, 2018	1 year	New York Knicks	
Gary Payton II	January 21, 2019	10-Day Contract	Rio Grande Valley Vipers	

==== Subtractions ====
Player	Reason Left	Date Left	New Team	Ref.
Tim Frazier	UFA	July 1, 2018	New Orleans Pelicans	
Ty Lawson	UFA	July 1, 2018	(China) Shandong Golden Stars	
Chris McCullough	UFA	July 1, 2018	(China) Shanxi Brave Dragons	
Ramon Sessions	UFA	July 1, 2018	(Israel) Maccabi Tel Aviv	
Mike Scott	UFA	July 3, 2018	Los Angeles Clippers	
Okaro White	Waived	December 21, 2018	Long Island Nets	
Ron Baker	Waived	January 7, 2019		
