= Haglund's syndrome =

Medical condition of the heel

- Specialty: Podiatry

Haglund's syndrome is a group of signs and symptoms consisting of Haglund's deformity in combination with retrocalcaneal bursitis. It is often accompanied by Achilles tendinitis.

== Haglund's deformity ==
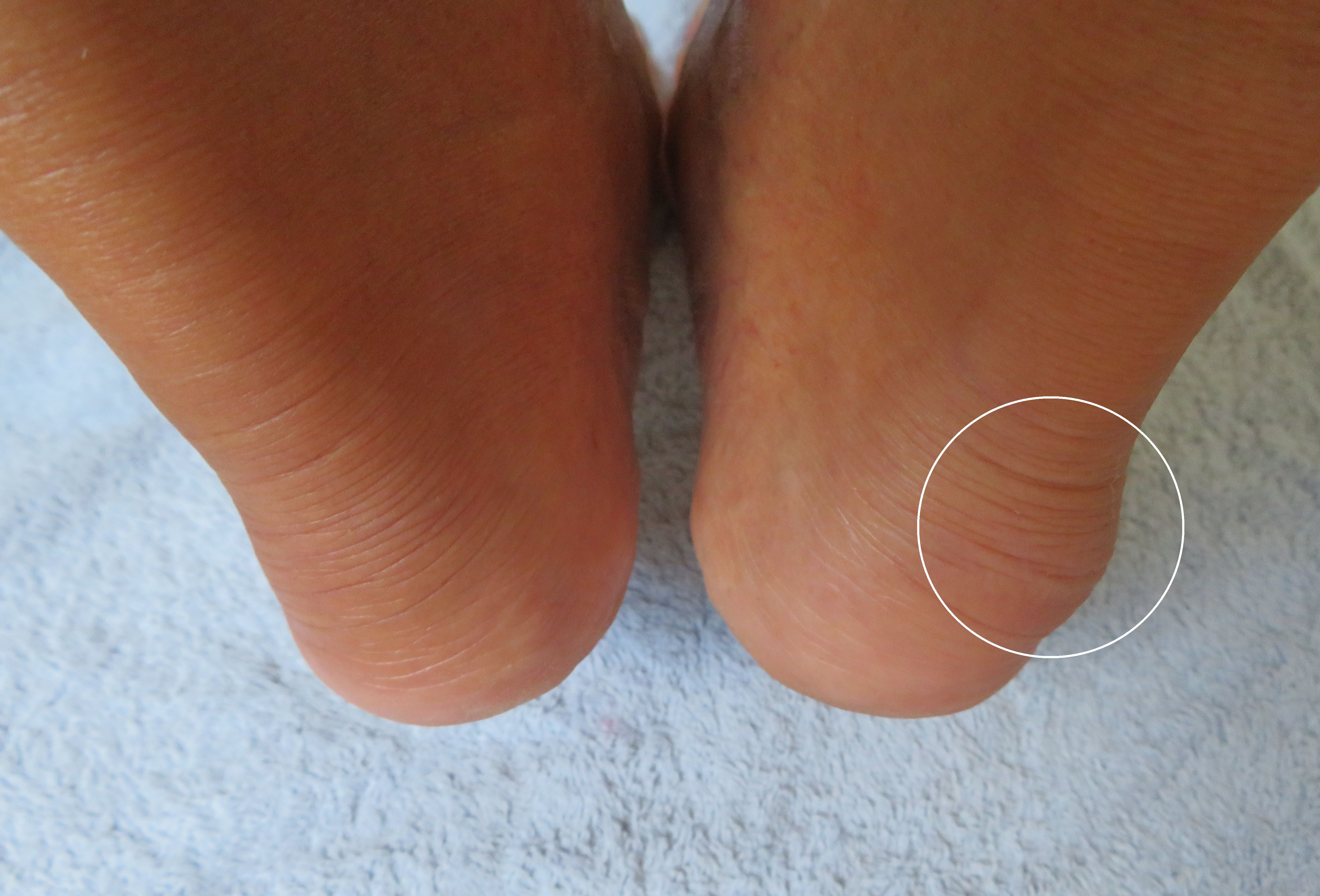
Right heel with a slightly developed upper heel spur.

Haglund's deformity was first described by Patrick Haglund in 1927. It is also known as retrocalcaneal exostosis, Mulholland deformity, and 'pump bump.' It is a prevalent clinical condition, but still poorly understood. Haglund's deformity is an abnormality of the bone and soft tissues in the foot. An enlargement of the bony section of the heel (where the Achilles tendon is inserted) triggers this condition. The soft tissue near the back of the heel can become irritated when the large, bony lump rubs against rigid shoes.

=== Diagnosis ===
The etiology is not well known, but some probable causes, like a tight Achilles tendon, a high foot arch, and heredity, have been suggested. Middle age is the most common age of affection, females are more affected than males, and the occurrence is often bilateral. A clinical feature of this condition is pain in the back of the heel, which is more severe after rest. Clinical evaluation and lateral radiographs of the ankle are mostly enough to make a diagnosis of Haglund's syndrome.

=== Prevention ===
To help prevent a recurrence of Haglund's deformity:

- wear appropriate shoes; avoid shoes with a rigid heel back
- use arch supports or orthotic devices
- perform stretching exercises to prevent the Achilles tendon from tightening
- avoid running on hard surfaces and running uphill

=== Known Treatments ===
1. Haglund's syndrome is often treated conservatively by altering the heel height in shoe wear, orthosis, physiotherapy, and anti-inflammatory drugs. Surgical excision of the bony exostoses of the calcaneum is only required in resistant cases.
2. Keck and Kelly Wedge Osteotomy
3. Excision of the retrocalcaneal bursa.
4. Calcaneal osteotomy.
5. Osseous debridement from the Achilles tendon.
6. Retrocalcaneal enthesophyte resection with functional Achilles tendon lengthening and buried knots.
