= 2018–19 Milwaukee Bucks season =

NBA professional basketball team season

- Division champions
- Head coach: Mike Budenholzer
- General manager: Jon Horst
- Owners: Wesley Edens; Marc Lasry
- Arena: Fiserv Forum

Results
- Record: 60–22 (.732)
- Place: Division: 1st (Central); Conference: 1st (Eastern)
- Playoff finish: Conference finals (lost to Raptors 2–4)
- Stats at Basketball Reference

Local media
- Television: Fox Sports Wisconsin
- Radio: WTMJ (AM)

The 2018–19 Milwaukee Bucks season was the 51st season of the franchise in the National Basketball Association (NBA). The Bucks moved from the Bradley Center to the new Fiserv Forum before the start of the season. On May 17, 2018, the Bucks hired Mike Budenholzer as head coach. The Bucks opened the season with seven straight wins, the first time they started a season 7–0 since 1971–72. On March 1, 2019, with a 131–120 victory over the Los Angeles Lakers, the Bucks became the first team to secure a playoff berth in the season. Later on, The Bucks clinched their first Division Championship since 2000-01. They then clinched the best record in the NBA with a win against the Philadelphia 76ers on April 4, 2019, achieving the feat for the first time since 1973–74. Eventually, the Bucks finished the regular season with a 60–22 record, the franchise's first 60-win season since 1980–81. The Bucks finished 33–8 at home, the second-best home record in the NBA, behind the Denver Nuggets, and their 27–14 road record was the best in the league, tied with the Golden State Warriors. The Bucks also won all 14 of their season series against Eastern Conference opponents, and lost back-to-back games just once, resulting in their longest losing streak for the season, at two games. The Bucks had the best team defensive rating in the NBA.

In the playoffs, the Bucks defeated the Detroit Pistons in the First Round by a four-game sweep, winning their first playoff series since 2001. The Bucks then defeated the Boston Celtics in the Semifinals in five games, advancing to the Eastern Conference finals for the first time since 2001, where they faced the Toronto Raptors and lost to the eventual NBA Champion in six games, despite taking the first two.

Giannis Antetokounmpo was named league MVP after this season and he and Khris Middleton were voted to play in the 2019 NBA All-Star Game. Also, following the season Malcolm Brogdon, who won Rookie of the Year in 2017, left the team in free agency for the Indiana Pacers after just three years with the Bucks.

== Draft picks ==
Round	Pick	Player	Position(s)	Nationality	College
1	17	Donte DiVincenzo	SG	United States	Villanova

== Roster ==
2018–19 Milwaukee Bucks roster
Players

Pos.	No.	Player	Height	Weight	DOB	From
F	34	Giannis Antetokounmpo	6 ft 11 in (2.11 m)	242 lb (110 kg)	1994–12–06	Greece
G	6	Eric Bledsoe	6 ft 1 in (1.85 m)	205 lb (93 kg)	1989–12–09	Kentucky
G	13	Malcolm Brogdon	6 ft 5 in (1.96 m)	229 lb (104 kg)	1992–12–11	Virginia
F	23	Sterling Brown	6 ft 6 in (1.98 m)	232 lb (105 kg)	1995–02–10	SMU
F	50	Bonzie Colson (TW)	6 ft 6 in (1.98 m)	225 lb (102 kg)	1996–01–12	Notre Dame
G	24	Pat Connaughton	6 ft 4 in (1.93 m)	209 lb (95 kg)	1993–01–06	Notre Dame
G	9	Donte DiVincenzo (injured)	6 ft 4 in (1.93 m)	203 lb (92 kg)	1997–01–31	Villanova
G	12	Tim Frazier	6 ft 1 in (1.85 m)	170 lb (77 kg)	1990–11–01	Penn State
C	17	Pau Gasol (injured)	7 ft 1 in (2.16 m)	250 lb (113 kg)	1980–07–06	Spain
G	3	George Hill	6 ft 3 in (1.91 m)	188 lb (85 kg)	1986–05–04	IUPUI
F	77	Ersan İlyasova	6 ft 10 in (2.08 m)	235 lb (107 kg)	1987–05–15	Turkey
C	11	Brook Lopez	7 ft 0 in (2.13 m)	275 lb (125 kg)	1988–04–01	Stanford
F	22	Khris Middleton	6 ft 8 in (2.03 m)	222 lb (101 kg)	1991–08–12	Texas A&M
F	41	Nikola Mirotić	6 ft 10 in (2.08 m)	250 lb (113 kg)	1991–02–11	Spain
F	21	Tony Snell	6 ft 7 in (2.01 m)	221 lb (100 kg)	1991–11–10	New Mexico
F	5	D. J. Wilson (injured)	6 ft 10 in (2.08 m)	231 lb (105 kg)	1996–02–19	Michigan

Coaches
Head coach
- Mike Budenholzer
Assistant(s)
- Vin Baker
- Darvin Ham
- Taylor Jenkins
- Charles Lee
- Josh Longstaff
- Patrick St. Andrews
- Ben Sullivan

Legend
- (DP) Unsigned draft pick
- (FA) Free agent
- (S) Suspended
- (GL) On assignment to G League affiliate
- (TW) Two-way affiliate player
- Injured

Roster
Updated: 2019–04–09

== Standings ==
=== Division ===
Central Division	W	L	PCT	GB	Home	Road	Div	GP
z – Milwaukee Bucks	60	22	.732	–	33‍–‍8	27‍–‍14	14–2	82
x – Indiana Pacers	48	34	.585	12.0	29‍–‍12	19‍–‍22	11–5	82
x – Detroit Pistons	41	41	.500	19.0	26‍–‍15	15‍–‍26	8–8	82
Chicago Bulls	22	60	.268	38.0	9‍–‍32	13‍–‍28	3–13	82
Cleveland Cavaliers	19	63	.232	41.0	13‍–‍28	6‍–‍35	4–12	82

=== Conference ===
Eastern Conference
#	Team	W	L	PCT	GB	GP
1	z – Milwaukee Bucks *	60	22	.732	–	82
2	y – Toronto Raptors *	58	24	.707	2.0	82
3	x – Philadelphia 76ers	51	31	.622	9.0	82
4	x – Boston Celtics	49	33	.598	11.0	82
5	x – Indiana Pacers	48	34	.585	12.0	82
6	x – Brooklyn Nets	42	40	.512	18.0	82
7	y – Orlando Magic *	42	40	.512	18.0	82
8	x – Detroit Pistons	41	41	.500	19.0	82
9	Charlotte Hornets	39	43	.476	21.0	82
10	Miami Heat	39	43	.476	21.0	82
11	Washington Wizards	32	50	.390	28.0	82
12	Atlanta Hawks	29	53	.354	31.0	82
13	Chicago Bulls	22	60	.268	38.0	82
14	Cleveland Cavaliers	19	63	.232	41.0	82
15	New York Knicks	17	65	.207	43.0	82

== Game log ==
=== Preseason ===
2018 preseason game log
Total: 3–1 (home: 2–0; road: 1–1)
Preseason: 3–1 (home: 2–0; road: 1–1)

Game	Date	Team	Score	High points	High rebounds	High assists	Location Attendance	Record
1	October 3	Chicago	W 116–82	Giannis Antetokounmpo (19)	Giannis Antetokounmpo (13)	Bledsoe, DiVincenzo, Frazier (6)	Fiserv Forum; 15,107	1–0
2	October 7	@ Minnesota	W 125–107	Giannis Antetokounmpo (21)	Giannis Antetokounmpo (10)	Tim Frazier (5)	Hilton Coliseum; 11,603	2–0
3	October 9	@ Oklahoma City	L 115–119 (OT)	Christian Wood (19)	Christian Wood (15)	Malcolm Brogdon (7)	Chesapeake Energy Arena; 18,203	2–1
4	October 12	Minnesota	W 143–121	Giannis Antetokounmpo (32)	Giannis Antetokounmpo (12)	Giannis Antetokounmpo (10)	Fiserv Forum; 14,724	3–1

2018–19 season schedule

=== Regular season ===
2018–19 game log
Total: 60–22 (home: 33–8; road: 27–14)
October: 7–0 (home: 5–0; road: 2–0)

Game	Date	Team	Score	High points	High rebounds	High assists	Location Attendance	Record
1	October 17	@ Charlotte	W 113–112	Giannis Antetokounmpo (25)	Giannis Antetokounmpo (18)	Giannis Antetokounmpo (8)	Spectrum Center; 17,889	1–0
2	October 19	Indiana	W 118–101	Giannis Antetokounmpo (26)	Giannis Antetokounmpo (15)	Bledsoe, Brogdon (7)	Fiserv Forum; 17,341	2–0
3	October 22	New York	W 124–113	Giannis Antetokounmpo (31)	Giannis Antetokounmpo (15)	Eric Bledsoe (13)	Fiserv Forum; 16,228	3–0
4	October 24	Philadelphia	W 123–108	Giannis Antetokounmpo (32)	Giannis Antetokounmpo (18)	Giannis Antetokounmpo (10)	Fiserv Forum; 17,341	4–0
5	October 26	@ Minnesota	W 125–95	Middleton, Ilyasova (16)	Giannis Antetokounmpo (12)	Eric Bledsoe (9)	Target Center; 16,334	5–0
6	October 27	Orlando	W 113–91	Giannis Antetokounmpo (21)	Ersan Ilyasova (10)	Ersan Ilyasova (6)	Fiserv Forum; 17,341	6–0
7	October 29	Toronto	W 124–109	Ersan Ilyasova (19)	Ersan Ilyasova (10)	Middleton, Bledsoe (8)	Fiserv Forum; 17,341	7–0

November : 8–6 (home: 6–2; road: 2–4)

Game	Date	Team	Score	High points	High rebounds	High assists	Location Attendance	Record
8	November 1	@ Boston	L 113–117	Giannis Antetokounmpo (33)	Giannis Antetokounmpo (11)	Eric Bledsoe (7)	TD Garden; 18,624	7–1
9	November 4	Sacramento	W 144–109	Giannis Antetokounmpo (26)	Giannis Antetokounmpo (15)	Giannis Antetokounmpo (11)	Fiserv Forum; 17,341	8–1
10	November 6	@ Portland	L 103–118	Giannis Antetokounmpo (23)	Antetokounmpo, Ilyasova (9)	Eric Bledsoe (7)	Moda Center; 19,512	8–2
11	November 8	@ Golden State	W 134–111	Eric Bledsoe (26)	Giannis Antetokounmpo (9)	Middleton, Bledsoe (6)	Oracle Arena; 19,596	9–2
12	November 10	@ L.A. Clippers	L 126–128 (OT)	Giannis Antetokounmpo (27)	Giannis Antetokounmpo (18)	Middleton, Bledsoe, Connaughton (5)	Staples Center; 17,486	9–3
13	November 11	@ Denver	W 121–114	Brook Lopez (28)	Giannis Antetokounmpo (9)	Giannis Antetokounmpo (8)	Pepsi Center; 19,520	10–3
14	November 14	Memphis	L 113–116	Giannis Antetokounmpo (31)	Giannis Antetokounmpo (9)	Eric Bledsoe (7)	Fiserv Forum; 16,817	10–4
15	November 16	Chicago	W 123–104	Eric Bledsoe (25)	Giannis Antetokounmpo (13)	Khris Middleton (8)	Fiserv Forum; 17,341	11–4
16	November 19	Denver	W 104–98	Giannis Antetokounmpo (29)	Giannis Antetokounmpo (12)	Giannis Antetokounmpo (6)	Fiserv Forum; 17,341	12–4
17	November 21	Portland	W 143–100	Giannis Antetokounmpo (33)	Giannis Antetokounmpo (16)	Giannis Antetokounmpo (9)	Fiserv Forum; 17,591	13–4
18	November 23	Phoenix	L 114–116	Giannis Antetokounmpo (35)	Giannis Antetokounmpo (10)	Eric Bledsoe (7)	Fiserv Forum; 17,852	13–5
19	November 24	San Antonio	W 135–129	Giannis Antetokounmpo (34)	Giannis Antetokounmpo (18)	Eric Bledsoe (10)	Fiserv Forum; 17,559	14–5
20	November 26	@ Charlotte	L 107–110	Giannis Antetokounmpo (20)	Giannis Antetokounmpo (13)	Giannis Antetokounmpo (9)	Spectrum Center; 13,805	14–6
21	November 28	Chicago	W 116–113	Giannis Antetokounmpo (36)	Giannis Antetokounmpo (11)	Giannis Antetokounmpo (8)	Fiserv Forum; 16,660	15–6

December : 10–4 (home: 5–1; road: 5–3)

Game	Date	Team	Score	High points	High rebounds	High assists	Location Attendance	Record
22	December 1	@ New York	L 134–136 (OT)	Giannis Antetokounmpo (33)	Giannis Antetokounmpo (19)	Antetokounmpo, Bledsoe (7)	Madison Square Garden; 19,812	15–7
23	December 5	Detroit	W 115–92	Eric Bledsoe (27)	Giannis Antetokounmpo (8)	Matthew Dellavedova (6)	Fiserv Forum; 16,541	16–7
24	December 7	Golden State	L 95–105	Giannis Antetokounmpo (22)	Giannis Antetokounmpo (15)	Giannis Antetokounmpo (5)	Fiserv Forum; 17,852	16–8
25	December 9	@ Toronto	W 104–99	Antetokounmpo, Lopez (19)	Giannis Antetokounmpo (19)	Giannis Antetokounmpo (6)	Scotiabank Arena; 19,800	17–8
26	December 10	Cleveland	W 108–92	Eric Bledsoe (20)	Eric Bledsoe (12)	Bledsoe, Brogdon (5)	Fiserv Forum; 17,155	18–8
27	December 12	@ Indiana	L 97–113	Eric Bledsoe (26)	Giannis Antetokounmpo (10)	Giannis Antetokounmpo (7)	Bankers Life Fieldhouse; 17,070	18–9
28	December 14	@ Cleveland	W 114–102	Giannis Antetokounmpo (44)	Giannis Antetokounmpo (14)	Giannis Antetokounmpo (8)	Quicken Loans Arena; 19,432	19–9
29	December 17	@ Detroit	W 107–104	Giannis Antetokounmpo (32)	Giannis Antetokounmpo (12)	Eric Bledsoe (9)	Little Caesars Arena; 15,051	20–9
30	December 19	New Orleans	W 123–115	Giannis Antetokounmpo (25)	D. J. Wilson (10)	Giannis Antetokounmpo (8)	Fiserv Forum; 17,341	21–9
31	December 21	@ Boston	W 120–107	Giannis Antetokounmpo (30)	Antetokounmpo, Brogdon (9)	Antetokounmpo, Middleton (5)	TD Garden; 18,624	22–9
32	December 22	@ Miami	L 87–94	Khris Middleton (18)	Giannis Antetokounmpo (13)	Eric Bledsoe (6)	American Airlines Arena; 19,600	22–10
33	December 25	@ New York	W 109–95	Giannis Antetokounmpo (30)	Giannis Antetokounmpo (14)	Eric Bledsoe (5)	Madison Square Garden; 19,812	23–10
34	December 27	New York	W 112–96	Giannis Antetokounmpo (31)	Giannis Antetokounmpo (14)	Giannis Antetokounmpo (8)	Fiserv Forum; 18,058	24–10
35	December 29	Brooklyn	W 129–115	Giannis Antetokounmpo (31)	Giannis Antetokounmpo (11)	Giannis Antetokounmpo (10)	Fiserv Forum; 17,913	25–10

January : 12–3 (home: 6–1; road: 6–2)

Game	Date	Team	Score	High points	High rebounds	High assists	Location Attendance	Record
36	January 1	Detroit	W 121–98	Brook Lopez (25)	Giannis Antetokounmpo (8)	Giannis Antetokounmpo (7)	Fiserv Forum; 17,534	26–10
37	January 4	Atlanta	W 144–112	Middleton, Brogdon (19)	Ersan Ilyasova (10)	Giannis Antetokounmpo (10)	Fiserv Forum; 17,632	27–10
38	January 5	Toronto	L 116–123	Giannis Antetokounmpo (43)	Giannis Antetokounmpo (18)	Khris Middleton (9)	Fiserv Forum; 18,028	27–11
39	January 7	Utah	W 114–102	Giannis Antetokounmpo (30)	Giannis Antetokounmpo (10)	Eric Bledsoe (6)	Fiserv Forum; 17,341	28–11
40	January 9	@ Houston	W 116–109	Giannis Antetokounmpo (27)	Giannis Antetokounmpo (21)	Bledsoe, Antetokounmpo (5)	Toyota Center; 18,055	29–11
41	January 11	@ Washington	L 106–113	Khris Middleton (25)	Bledsoe, Middleton (8)	Eric Bledsoe (9)	Capital One Arena; 17,966	29–12
42	January 13	@ Atlanta	W 133–114	Giannis Antetokounmpo (33)	Khris Middleton (11)	Eric Bledsoe (10)	State Farm Arena; 16,292	30–12
43	January 15	Miami	W 124–86	Eric Bledsoe (17)	Giannis Antetokounmpo (10)	Giannis Antetokounmpo (10)	Fiserv Forum; 17,626	31–12
44	January 16	@ Memphis	W 111–101	Giannis Antetokounmpo (27)	Giannis Antetokounmpo (11)	Khris Middleton (5)	FedExForum; 14,921	32–12
45	January 19	@ Orlando	W 118–108	Giannis Antetokounmpo (25)	Giannis Antetokounmpo (13)	Giannis Antetokounmpo (5)	Amway Center; 18,846	33–12
46	January 21	Dallas	W 116–106	Giannis Antetokounmpo (31)	Giannis Antetokounmpo (15)	Bledsoe, Antetokounmpo (5)	Fiserv Forum; 17,963	34–12
47	January 25	Charlotte	W 108–99	Giannis Antetokounmpo (34)	Giannis Antetokounmpo (14)	Khris Middleton (4)	Fiserv Forum; 17,803	35–12
48	January 27	@ Oklahoma City	L 112–118	Giannis Antetokounmpo (27)	Giannis Antetokounmpo (18)	Khris Middleton (6)	Chesapeake Energy Arena; 18,203	35–13
49	January 29	@ Detroit	W 115–105	Giannis Antetokounmpo (21)	Giannis Antetokounmpo (8)	Giannis Antetokounmpo (11)	Little Caesars Arena; 14,187	36–13
50	January 31	@ Toronto	W 105–92	Giannis Antetokounmpo (19)	Giannis Antetokounmpo (9)	Eric Bledsoe (6)	Scotiabank Arena; 19,800	37–13

February : 10–1 (home: 3–1; road: 7–0)

Game	Date	Team	Score	High points	High rebounds	High assists	Location Attendance	Record
51	February 2	@ Washington	W 131–115	Giannis Antetokounmpo (37)	Giannis Antetokounmpo (10)	Khris Middleton (6)	Capital One Arena; 20,409	38–13
52	February 4	@ Brooklyn	W 113–94	Giannis Antetokounmpo (30)	Giannis Antetokounmpo (15)	Giannis Antetokounmpo (9)	Barclays Center; 16,209	39–13
53	February 6	Washington	W 148–129	Giannis Antetokounmpo (43)	D. J. Wilson (7)	Eric Bledsoe (11)	Fiserv Forum; 17,360	40–13
54	February 8	@ Dallas	W 122–107	Giannis Antetokounmpo (29)	Giannis Antetokounmpo (17)	Bledsoe, Antetokounmpo (5)	American Airlines Center; 20,420	41–13
55	February 9	Orlando	L 83–103	Eric Bledsoe (19)	Khris Middleton (12)	Eric Bledsoe (5)	Fiserv Forum; 17,812	41–14
56	February 11	@ Chicago	W 112–99	Giannis Antetokounmpo (29)	Giannis Antetokounmpo (17)	Giannis Antetokounmpo (8)	United Center; 18,833	42–14
57	February 13	@ Indiana	W 106–97	Giannis Antetokounmpo (33)	Giannis Antetokounmpo (19)	Giannis Antetokounmpo (11)	Bankers Life Fieldhouse; 17,311	43–14
58	February 21	Boston	W 98–97	Giannis Antetokounmpo (30)	Antetokounmpo, Middleton (13)	Giannis Antetokounmpo (6)	Fiserv Forum; 17,926	44–14
59	February 23	Minnesota	W 140–128	Khris Middleton (28)	Giannis Antetokounmpo (10)	Bledsoe, Antetokounmpo (7)	Fiserv Forum; 17,972	45–14
60	February 25	@ Chicago	W 117–106	Middleton, Brogdon (22)	D. J. Wilson (8)	Connaughton, Brogdon (22)	United Center; 20,936	46–14
61	February 27	@ Sacramento	W 141–140 (OT)	Eric Bledsoe (26)	Eric Bledsoe (12)	Eric Bledsoe (13)	Golden 1 Center; 17,583	47–14

March : 10–6 (home: 7–1; road: 3–5)

Game	Date	Team	Score	High points	High rebounds	High assists	Location Attendance	Record
62	March 1	@ L.A. Lakers	W 131–120	Khris Middleton (31)	Giannis Antetokounmpo (15)	Antetokounmpo, Middleton (6)	Staples Center; 18,997	48–14
63	March 2	@ Utah	L 111–115	Giannis Antetokounmpo (43)	Giannis Antetokounmpo (14)	Giannis Antetokounmpo (8)	Vivint Smart Home Arena; 18,306	48–15
64	March 4	@ Phoenix	L 105–114	Giannis Antetokounmpo (21)	Giannis Antetokounmpo (13)	Giannis Antetokounmpo (6)	Talking Stick Resort Arena; 18,055	48–16
65	March 7	Indiana	W 117–98	Giannis Antetokounmpo (29)	Giannis Antetokounmpo (12)	Giannis Antetokounmpo (5)	Fiserv Forum; 17,884	49–16
66	March 9	Charlotte	W 131–114	Giannis Antetokounmpo (26)	Giannis Antetokounmpo (13)	Giannis Antetokounmpo (6)	Fiserv Forum; 17,996	50–16
67	March 10	@ San Antonio	L 114–121	Giannis Antetokounmpo (27)	Giannis Antetokounmpo (13)	Antetokounmpo, Bledsoe (6)	AT&T Center; 18,594	50–17
68	March 12	@ New Orleans	W 130–113	Giannis Antetokounmpo (24)	Giannis Antetokounmpo (9)	Khris Middleton (7)	Smoothie King Center; 15,562	51–17
69	March 15	@ Miami	W 113–98	Giannis Antetokounmpo (33)	Giannis Antetokounmpo (16)	Giannis Antetokounmpo (9)	American Airlines Arena; 19,600	52–17
70	March 17	Philadelphia	L 125–130	Giannis Antetokounmpo (52)	Giannis Antetokounmpo (16)	Giannis Antetokounmpo (7)	Fiserv Forum; 18,148	52–18
71	March 19	L.A. Lakers	W 115–101	Khris Middleton (30)	Khris Middleton (10)	Eric Bledsoe (7)	Fiserv Forum; 17,879	53–18
72	March 20	@ Cleveland	L 102–107	Khris Middleton (26)	Khris Middleton (12)	Eric Bledsoe (8)	Quicken Loans Arena; 19,432	53–19
73	March 22	Miami	W 116–87	Giannis Antetokounmpo (27)	Pat Connaughton (10)	Khris Middleton (10)	Fiserv Forum; 18,094	54–19
74	March 24	Cleveland	W 127–105	Giannis Antetokounmpo (26)	Giannis Antetokounmpo (10)	Antetokounmpo, Bledsoe (7)	Fiserv Forum; 17,930	55–19
75	March 26	Houston	W 108–94	Eric Bledsoe (23)	Giannis Antetokounmpo (14)	Eric Bledsoe (7)	Fiserv Forum; 17,910	56–19
76	March 28	L.A. Clippers	W 128–118	Khris Middleton (39)	Antetokounmpo, Lopez, Middleton (9)	Eric Bledsoe (8)	Fiserv Forum; 17,922	57–19
77	March 31	@ Atlanta	L 135–136 (OT)	Sterling Brown (27)	Bonzie Colson (16)	Tim Frazier (15)	State Farm Arena; 16,660	57–20

April : 3–2 (home: 1–2; road: 2–0)

Game	Date	Team	Score	High points	High rebounds	High assists	Location Attendance	Record
78	April 1	@ Brooklyn	W 131–121	Eric Bledsoe (29)	Giannis Antetokounmpo (11)	Frazier, Bledsoe (7)	Barclays Center; 17,732	58–20
79	April 4	@ Philadelphia	W 128–122	Giannis Antetokounmpo (45)	Giannis Antetokounmpo (13)	Giannis Antetokounmpo (6)	Wells Fargo Center; 20,701	59–20
80	April 6	Brooklyn	L 128–133	Eric Bledsoe (33)	Brook Lopez (8)	Eric Bledsoe (11)	Fiserv Forum; 18,116	59–21
81	April 7	Atlanta	W 115–107	Giannis Antetokounmpo (30)	Giannis Antetokounmpo (9)	Eric Bledsoe (5)	Fiserv Forum; 17,775	60–21
82	April 10	Oklahoma City	L 116–127	Tim Frazier (29)	D. J. Wilson (17)	Tim Frazier (13)	Fiserv Forum; 18,082	60–22

2018–19 season schedule

=== Playoffs ===
2019 playoff game log
Total: 10–5 (home: 6–2; road: 4–3)
First Round: 4–0 (home: 2–0; road: 2–0)

Game	Date	Team	Score	High points	High rebounds	High assists	Location Attendance	Series
1	April 14	Detroit	W 121–86	Giannis Antetokounmpo (24)	Giannis Antetokounmpo (17)	Sterling Brown (7)	Fiserv Forum; 17,529	1–0
2	April 17	Detroit	W 120–99	Eric Bledsoe (27)	Giannis Antetokounmpo (12)	Khris Middleton (8)	Fiserv Forum; 17,513	2–0
3	April 20	@ Detroit	W 119–103	Khris Middleton (20)	Giannis Antetokounmpo (10)	Bledsoe, Hill (5)	Little Caesars Arena; 20,520	3–0
4	April 22	@ Detroit	W 127–104	Giannis Antetokounmpo (41)	Sterling Brown (13)	Sterling Brown (6)	Little Caesars Arena; 20,332	4–0

Conference Semifinals: 4–1 (home: 2–1; road: 2–0)

Game	Date	Team	Score	High points	High rebounds	High assists	Location Attendance	Series
1	April 28	Boston	L 90–112	Giannis Antetokounmpo (22)	Khris Middleton (10)	Khris Middleton (6)	Fiserv Forum; 17,341	0–1
2	April 30	Boston	W 123–102	Giannis Antetokounmpo (29)	Pat Connaughton (11)	Eric Bledsoe (5)	Fiserv Forum; 17,536	1–1
3	May 3	@ Boston	W 123–116	Giannis Antetokounmpo (32)	Giannis Antetokounmpo (13)	Giannis Antetokounmpo (8)	TD Garden; 18,624	2–1
4	May 6	@ Boston	W 113–101	Giannis Antetokounmpo (39)	Giannis Antetokounmpo (16)	Khris Middleton (7)	TD Garden; 18,624	3–1
5	May 8	Boston	W 116–91	Giannis Antetokounmpo (20)	Mirotić, Connaughton (11)	Giannis Antetokounmpo (8)	Fiserv Forum; 17,701	4–1

Conference Finals: 2–4 (home: 2–1; road: 0–3)

Game	Date	Team	Score	High points	High rebounds	High assists	Location Attendance	Series
1	May 15	Toronto	W 108–100	Brook Lopez (29)	Giannis Antetokounmpo (14)	Giannis Antetokounmpo (6)	Fiserv Forum; 17,345	1–0
2	May 17	Toronto	W 125–103	Giannis Antetokounmpo (30)	Giannis Antetokounmpo (17)	Eric Bledsoe (7)	Fiserv Forum; 17,570	2–0
3	May 19	@ Toronto	L 112–118 (2OT)	George Hill (24)	Giannis Antetokounmpo (23)	Giannis Antetokounmpo (6)	Scotiabank Arena; 19,923	2–1
4	May 21	@ Toronto	L 102–120	Khris Middleton (30)	Giannis Antetokounmpo (10)	Khris Middleton (7)	Scotiabank Arena; 20,237	2–2
5	May 23	Toronto	L 99–105	Giannis Antetokounmpo (24)	Malcolm Brogdon (11)	Khris Middleton (10)	Fiserv Forum; 17,384	2–3
6	May 25	@ Toronto	L 94–100	Giannis Antetokounmpo (21)	Giannis Antetokounmpo (11)	Eric Bledsoe (7)	Scotiabank Arena; 20,478	2–4

2019 playoff schedule

== Player statistics ==
=== Regular season ===
Milwaukee Bucks statistics
Player	GP	GS	MPG	FG%	3P%	FT%	RPG	APG	SPG	BPG	PPG
Giannis Antetokounmpo	72	72	32.8	.578	.256	.729	12.5	5.9	1.3	1.5	27.7
Eric Bledsoe	78	78	29.1	.484	.329	.750	4.6	5.5	1.5	0.4	15.9
Malcolm Brogdon	64	64	28.6	.505	.426	.928	4.5	3.2	0.7	0.2	15.6
Sterling Brown	58	7	17.8	.465	.361	.690	3.2	1.4	0.4	0.1	6.4
Isaiah Canaan	4	0	7.8	.333	.400	—	1.0	0.8	0.0	0.3	1.5
Bonzie Colson ^{[a]}	8	2	12.3	.333	.238	.889	3.8	0.4	0.6	0.1	4.9
Pat Connaughton	61	2	20.7	.466	.330	.725	4.2	2.0	0.5	0.4	6.9
Matthew Dellavedova ^{[a]}	12	0	8.1	.316	.364	1.000	0.8	2.4	0.2	0.0	1.7
Donte DiVincenzo	27	0	15.2	.403	.265	.750	2.4	1.1	0.5	0.2	4.9
Trevon Duval	3	0	2.0	.667	1.000	—	.3	.7	.0	.0	1.7
Tim Frazier ^{[a]}	12	2	17.6	.424	.417	.692	.3	.7	.0	.0	6.3
Pau Gasol ^{[a]}	3	0	10.0	.167	.333	.500	3.3	.7	.0	.3	1.3
John Henson ^{[a]}	14	0	13.4	.463	.355	.600	5.1	1.0	.5	.8	5.6
George Hill	47	0	20.4	.428	.280	.815	2.6	2.1	0.9	0.1	6.8
Ersan İlyasova	67	7	18.4	.438	.363	.824	4.5	0.8	0.5	0.3	6.8
Brook Lopez	81	81	28.7	.435	.365	.842	4.9	1.2	.6	2.2	12.5
Thon Maker ^{[a]}	35	0	11.7	.440	.333	.541	2.7	.5	.3	.5	4.7
Khris Middleton	77	77	31.1	.441	.378	.837	6.0	4.3	1.0	.1	18.3
Nikola Mirotić ^{[a]}	14	3	22.9	.415	.356	.870	5.4	1.4	.7	.6	11.6
Jaylen Morris ^{[a]}	4	0	7.3	.400	.333	.500	1.3	1.0	.5	.0	2.5
Jason Smith ^{[a]}	6	0	6.7	.308	.333	1.000	1.8	.2	.3	.3	2.2
Tony Snell	74	12	17.6	.452	.397	.881	2.1	.9	.4	.2	6.0
D. J. Wilson	48	3	18.4	.414	.362	.553	4.6	1.1	.4	.4	5.8
Christian Wood ^{[a]}	13	0	4.8	.480	.600	.667	1.5	.2	.0	.0	2.8

- ^{a} Statistics with the Milwaukee Bucks.

=== Playoffs ===
Milwaukee Bucks statistics
Player	GP	GS	MPG	FG%	3P%	FT%	RPG	APG	SPG	BPG	PPG
Giannis Antetokounmpo	15	15	34.3	.494	.327	.637	12.2	4.9	1.2	2.0	25.5
Eric Bledsoe	15	15	28.2	.411	.236	.706	3.7	4.3	1.1	.4	13.7
Malcolm Brogdon	7	2	28.3	.449	.378	.636	4.9	3.4	.7	.1	13.0
Sterling Brown	11	5	14.7	.395	.333	.727	2.7	1.7	.5	.3	4.1
Pat Connaughton	15	0	21.6	.481	.357	.500	6.2	1.4	.4	.9	6.2
Tim Frazier	11	0	3.6	.615	.500	1.000	.8	.9	.1	.0	1.9
George Hill	15	0	26.3	.534	.417	.818	3.5	2.8	.8	.3	11.5
Ersan İlyasova	15	0	18.1	.432	.300	.800	4.7	1.4	.7	.4	6.8
Brook Lopez	15	15	29.2	.455	.293	.828	5.5	1.4	.4	1.9	11.2
Khris Middleton	15	15	34.3	.418	.435	.885	6.3	4.4	.4	.0	16.9
Nikola Mirotić	14	8	21.3	.376	.289	.821	4.3	.7	.7	.2	9.5
Tony Snell	9	0	3.1	.333	.500	—	.3	.0	.1	.1	0.6
D. J. Wilson	8	0	5.4	.500	.200	1.000	1.3	.5	.0	.1	2.4

== Transactions ==
=== Overview ===
Players Added

Via draft

- Donte DiVincenzo

Via trade

- George Hill
- Nikola Mirotić
- Jason Smith

Via free agency

- Bonzie Colson
- Pat Connaughton
- Trevon Duval
- Tim Frazier
- Pau Gasol
- Ersan İlyasova
- Brook Lopez
- Jaylen Morris
- Christian Wood
Players Lost

Via trade

- Matthew Dellavedova
- John Henson
- Thon Maker
- Jason Smith

Via free agency

- Xavier Munford
- Jabari Parker
- Marshall Plumlee

Waived

- Shabazz Muhammad
- Jaylen Morris
- Christian Wood
- Tyler Zeller

=== Trades ===
October 15, 2018	To Milwaukee Bucks Jodie Meeks; 2019 protected second-round pick Cash considerations	To Washington Wizards 2019 protected second-round pick	
December 7, 2018	To Milwaukee Bucks George Hill; Jason Smith; Protected 2021 second-round pick Cash considerations	To Cleveland Cavaliers Matthew Dellavedova; John Henson; 2021 first-round pick 2021 second-round pick 2022 second-round pick	To Washington Wizards Sam Dekker
February 7, 2019	To Milwaukee Bucks Nikola Mirotić	To New Orleans Pelicans Jason Smith; Stanley Johnson; 2019 protected second-round pick Two 2020 second-round picks 2021 second-round pick	To Detroit Pistons Thon Maker

=== Free agency ===
==== Re-signed ====
Player	Signed
Shabazz Muhammad	September 22, 2018

==== Additions ====
Player	Signed	Former Team
Ersan İlyasova	July 16, 2018	Philadelphia 76ers
Brook Lopez	July 17, 2018	Los Angeles Lakers
Trevon Duval	Two-way contract	Duke Blue Devils
Brandon McCoy	July 31, 2018	UNLV Runnin' Rebels
Travis Trice	July 31, 2018	(Lebanon) Champville SC
Jaylen Morris	Two-way contract	(Italy) Fiat Torino
Pat Connaughton	August 1, 2018	Portland Trail Blazers
Jordan Barnett	August 7, 2018	Missouri Tigers
Tim Frazier	September 22. 2018	Washington Wizards
Christian Wood	September 22. 2018	Delaware 87ers

==== Subtractions ====
Player	Signed	New Team
Jabari Parker	July 14, 2018	Chicago Bulls
Jordan Barnett		
Brandon McCoy		
Brandon Jennings		
Travis Trice

== Awards ==
- Giannis Antetokounmpo NBA MVP
