= James Borrego =

American basketball coach (born 1977)

Personal information
- Born: November 12, 1977 (age 49) Albuquerque, New Mexico, U.S.
- Listed height: 6 ft 5 in (1.96 m)
- Listed weight: 215 lb (98 kg)

Career information
- High school: Albuquerque Academy (Albuquerque, New Mexico)
- College: San Diego (1998–2001)
- Position: Forward
- Coaching career: 2001–present

Career history

Coaching
- 2001–2003: San Diego (assistant)
- 2003–2010: San Antonio Spurs (assistant)
- 2010–2012: New Orleans Hornets (assistant)
- 2012–2014: Orlando Magic (assistant)
- 2015: Orlando Magic (interim)
- 2015–2018: San Antonio Spurs (assistant)
- 2018–2022: Charlotte Hornets
- 2023–2025: New Orleans Pelicans (associate HC)
- 2025–2026: New Orleans Pelicans (interim)

Career highlights
- As assistant coach: 2× NBA champion (2005, 2007)

James Albert Borrego (born November 12, 1977) is an American professional basketball coach who most recently served as the interim head coach for the New Orleans Pelicans of the National Basketball Association (NBA). He has previously served as head coach for the Charlotte Hornets, and as an assistant coach for the San Antonio Spurs where he won two NBA championships under Gregg Popovich.

== Early life and playing career ==
Borrego was born on November 12, 1977, in Albuquerque, New Mexico, and is of Mexican American descent. Borrego led Albuquerque Academy to a pair of state basketball championships. In 2001, he earned a bachelor's degree in English and a master's degree in leadership studies from the University of San Diego. He played three seasons with the San Diego Toreros, and during his senior season (2000–01) was named to the West Coast Conference All-Academic Team.

== Coaching career ==
Borrego began his coaching career with his alma mater, University of San Diego, as an assistant from 2001 to 2003. During his tenure, San Diego captured the West Coast Conference Championship and earned a trip to the NCAA Tournament in the 2002–2003 season.

After his coaching stay with the Toreros, Borrego began in 2003 his career in professional basketball with the San Antonio Spurs, starting as an assistant video coordinator in the summer of 2003 and being promoted to assistant coach afterwards. He spent seven seasons with the Spurs, being part of two NBA championship teams in 2005 and 2007 before leaving the team to join former Spurs' assistant Monty Williams when he took the head coach job with the New Orleans Hornets from 2010 until 2012.

Afterwards, he joined Jacque Vaughn as the lead assistant for the Orlando Magic. He took over the Magic when Vaughn was fired on February 5, 2015. On February 6, he made his coaching debut against the Los Angeles Lakers, winning 103–97 in overtime. On February 17, he became the coach of the team for the rest of the season.

On June 17, 2015, he returned to the Spurs as an assistant coach for Gregg Popovich.

On May 10, 2018, the Charlotte Hornets named Borrego as their new head coach, signing him to a four-year deal with the team. Borrego became the first Latino head coach in the NBA's 72-year history.

On August 9, 2021, the Hornets signed Borrego to a multi-year contract extension. On April 22, 2022, Borrego was fired by the Hornets.

On June 3, 2023, he returned to the Pelicans as an assistant coach for Willie Green. On November 15, 2025, the Pelicans named Borrego as their interim head coach after the firing of Willie Green. His tenure ended when the team hired Jamahl Mosley as their permanent head coach on May 18.

== Personal life ==
Borrego and his wife have a daughter and two sons.

== Head coaching record ==
Legend
Regular season	G	Games coached	W	Games won	L	Games lost	W–L %	Win–loss %
Playoffs	PG	Playoff games	PW	Playoff wins	PL	Playoff losses	PW–L %	Playoff win–loss %

Team	Year	G	W	L	W–L%	Finish	PG	PW	PL	PW–L%	Result
Orlando	2014–15	30	10	20	.333	5th in Southeast	—	—	—	—	Missed playoffs
Charlotte	2018–19	82	39	43	.476	2nd in Southeast	—	—	—	—	Missed playoffs
Charlotte	2019–20	65	23	42	.354	4th in Southeast	—	—	—	—	Missed playoffs
Charlotte	2020–21	72	33	39	.458	4th in Southeast	—	—	—	—	Missed playoffs
Charlotte	2021–22	82	43	39	.524	3rd in Southeast	—	—	—	—	Missed playoffs
New Orleans	2025–26	70	24	46	.343	3rd in Southwest	—	—	—	—	Missed playoffs
Career		401	172	229	.429		—	—	—	—	
