= 2018–19 Charlotte Hornets season =

NBA professional basketball team season

- Head coach: James Borrego
- General manager: Mitch Kupchak
- Owners: Michael Jordan
- Arena: Spectrum Center

Results
- Record: 39–43 (.476)
- Place: Division: 2nd (Southeast); Conference: 9th (Eastern)
- Playoff finish: Did not qualify
- Stats at Basketball Reference

Local media
- Television: Fox Sports Carolinas, Fox Sports Southeast
- Radio: WFNZ

The 2018–19 Charlotte Hornets season was the 29th season of the franchise in the National Basketball Association (NBA). On April 13, 2018, the Hornets fired head coach Steve Clifford after the team missed the playoffs. On May 10, 2018, the Hornets hired James Borrego as head coach. This season is notable because the team is celebrating their 30th year in the NBA, also announcing that Muggsy Bogues and Dell Curry would be ambassadors for the team. With a Detroit Pistons win on April 10, against the New York Knicks, the Hornets were eliminated from playoff contention for the third straight season.

This season also marked Tony Parker's 18th and final season in the NBA, as he announced his retirement on June 10, 2019. As the last remaining active player from the Spurs Big 3, this season was Parker's first missing the playoffs and he was also the last remaining active player from the Spurs' 2003, 2005, and 2007 championship teams. Parker's retirement also left Rajon Rondo of the Los Angeles Lakers and Udonis Haslem and Dwyane Wade of the Miami Heat as the last remaining active players to win championships in the 2000s.

After 8 years, this season marked the end of the Kemba Walker era in Charlotte as he joined the Boston Celtics during the following summer.

== NBA draft ==
Round	Pick	Player	Position	Nationality	College / Club
1	11	Shai Gilgeous-Alexander	SG/PG	Canada	Kentucky
2	55	Arnoldas Kulboka	SF	Lithuania	(Italy) Orlandina Basket

The Hornets entered the draft with one first-round selection and one second-round selection, the latter of which originally belonged to the Cleveland Cavaliers. They had traded their 2019 second-round pick to the Memphis Grizzlies in a three-team trade in 2016, before ultimately landing with the Orlando Magic. They used the 11th pick to select future MVP Shai Gilgeous-Alexander, but soon traded his rights to the Los Angeles Clippers in exchange for the rights to the 12th pick, Miles Bridges, and two future second-round picks.

== Roster ==
2018–19 Charlotte Hornets roster
Players

Pos.	No.	Player	Height	Weight	DOB	From
G/F	7	Dwayne Bacon	6 ft 7 in (2.01 m)	221 lb (100 kg)	1995–08–30	Florida State
G/F	5	Nicolas Batum	6 ft 8 in (2.03 m)	200 lb (91 kg)	1988–12–14	France
C	8	Bismack Biyombo	6 ft 9 in (2.06 m)	255 lb (116 kg)	1992–08–28	DR Congo
F	0	Miles Bridges	6 ft 7 in (2.01 m)	225 lb (102 kg)	1998–03–21	Michigan State
G	31	Joe Chealey (TW)	6 ft 3 in (1.91 m)	190 lb (86 kg)	1995–11–01	College of Charleston
G	4	Devonte' Graham	6 ft 2 in (1.88 m)	185 lb (84 kg)	1995–02–22	Kansas
C	41	Willy Hernangómez	6 ft 11 in (2.11 m)	250 lb (113 kg)	1994–05–27	Spain
F/C	44	Frank Kaminsky	7 ft 0 in (2.13 m)	242 lb (110 kg)	1993–04–04	Wisconsin
F	14	Michael Kidd-Gilchrist	6 ft 7 in (2.01 m)	232 lb (105 kg)	1993–09–26	Kentucky
G	3	Jeremy Lamb	6 ft 5 in (1.96 m)	185 lb (84 kg)	1992–05–30	Connecticut
G	55	J. P. Macura (TW)	6 ft 5 in (1.96 m)	205 lb (93 kg)	1995–06–05	Xavier
PG	6	Shelvin Mack	6 ft 3 in (1.91 m)	203 lb (92 kg)	1990–04–22	Butler
G	1	Malik Monk	6 ft 3 in (1.91 m)	200 lb (91 kg)	1998–02–04	Kentucky
G	9	Tony Parker	6 ft 2 in (1.88 m)	185 lb (84 kg)	1982–05–17	France
G	15	Kemba Walker	6 ft 1 in (1.85 m)	184 lb (83 kg)	1990–05–08	Connecticut
F	2	Marvin Williams	6 ft 9 in (2.06 m)	237 lb (108 kg)	1986–06–19	North Carolina
C	40	Cody Zeller	7 ft 0 in (2.13 m)	240 lb (109 kg)	1992–10–05	Indiana

Coaches
Head coach
- James Borrego
Assistant(s)
- Dutch Gaitley
- Jay Hernandez
- Chad Iske
- Nathaniel Mitchell
- Ronald Nored
- Jay Triano

Legend
- (DP) Unsigned draft pick
- (FA) Free agent
- (S) Suspended
- (GL) On assignment to G League affiliate
- (TW) Two-way affiliate player
- Injured

Roster
Updated: 2019–02–10

== Game log ==
=== Preseason ===
2018 preseason game log
Total: 4–1 (Home: 3-0; Road: 1–1)
Preseason: 4–1 (home: 3–0; road: 1–1)

Game	Date	Team	Score	High points	High rebounds	High assists	Location Attendance	Record
1	September 28	Boston	W 104–97	Lamb (15)	Kidd-Gilchrist (12)	Batum (6)	Dean Smith Center; 18,081	1–0
2	September 30	@ Boston	L 112–115	Bridges (23)	Kaminsky (7)	Batum, Lamb, Monk (4)	TD Garden; 18,624	1–1
3	October 2	Miami	W 122–113	Walker (18)	Hernangómez (10)	Parker, Monk (7)	Spectrum Center; 8,417	2–1
4	October 8	Chicago	W 110–104	Walker (20)	Batum (12)	Batum (7)	Spectrum Center; 8,487	3–1
5	October 12	@ Dallas	W 123–118	Graham (15)	Bridges (7)	Monk (5)	American Airlines Center; 18,745	4–1

2018–19 season schedule

=== Regular season ===
2018–19 game log
Total: 39–43 (Home: 25–16; Road: 14–27)
October: 4–4 (home: 2–1; road: 2–3)

Game	Date	Team	Score	High points	High rebounds	High assists	Location Attendance	Record
1	October 17	Milwaukee	L 112–113	Kemba Walker (41)	Marvin Williams (9)	Tony Parker (7)	Spectrum Center; 17,889	0–1
2	October 19	@ Orlando	W 120–88	Kemba Walker (26)	Michael Kidd-Gilchrist (9)	Tony Parker (6)	Amway Center; 17,668	1–1
3	October 20	@ Miami	W 113–112	Kemba Walker (39)	Cody Zeller (8)	Kemba Walker (7)	American Airlines Arena; 19,600	2–1
4	October 22	@ Toronto	L 106–127	Kemba Walker (26)	Kemba Walker (5)	Kemba Walker (5)	Scotiabank Arena; 19,800	2–2
5	October 24	@ Chicago	L 110–112	Kemba Walker (23)	Marvin Williams (8)	Kemba Walker (6)	United Center; 19,170	2–3
6	October 26	Chicago	W 135–106	Kemba Walker (30)	Michael Kidd-Gilchrist (8)	Tony Parker (8)	Spectrum Center; 15,220	3–3
7	October 27	@ Philadelphia	L 103–105	Kemba Walker (37)	Nicolas Batum (10)	Kemba Walker (6)	Wells Fargo Center; 20,203	3–4
8	October 30	Miami	W 125–113	Tony Parker (24)	Kidd-Gilchrist, Hernangómez (8)	Tony Parker (11)	Spectrum Center; 14,117	4–4

November : 7–7 (home: 6–3; road: 1–4)

Game	Date	Team	Score	High points	High rebounds	High assists	Location Attendance	Record
9	November 1	Oklahoma City	L 107–111	Kemba Walker (21)	Kidd-Gilchrist, Lamb (9)	Kemba Walker (6)	Spectrum Center; 14,583	4–5
10	November 3	Cleveland	W 126–94	Jeremy Lamb (19)	Jeremy Lamb (8)	Nicolas Batum (8)	Spectrum Center; 16,221	5–5
11	November 6	Atlanta	W 113–102	Kemba Walker (29)	Willy Hernangómez (9)	Kemba Walker (7)	Spectrum Center; 13,955	6–5
12	November 9	@ Philadelphia	L 132–133 (OT)	Kemba Walker (30)	Michael Kidd-Gilchrist (12)	Kemba Walker (8)	Wells Fargo Center; 20,424	6–6
13	November 11	@ Detroit	W 113–103	Walker, Parker (24)	Batum, Bridges (8)	Kemba Walker (8)	Little Caesars Arena; 15,133	7–6
14	November 13	@ Cleveland	L 89–113	Jeremy Lamb (22)	Jeremy Lamb (6)	Kemba Walker (6)	Quicken Loans Arena; 19,432	7–7
15	November 17	Philadelphia	L 119–122 (OT)	Kemba Walker (60)	Jeremy Lamb (10)	Tony Parker (5)	Spectrum Center; 19,426	7–8
16	November 19	Boston	W 117–112	Kemba Walker (43)	Batum, Zeller (8)	Kemba Walker (5)	Spectrum Center; 18,040	8–8
17	November 21	Indiana	W 127–109	Jeremy Lamb (21)	Jeremy Lamb (7)	Kemba Walker (11)	Spectrum Center; 15,913	9–8
18	November 23	@ Oklahoma City	L 104–109	Kemba Walker (25)	Nicolas Batum (9)	Kemba Walker (8)	Chesapeake Energy Arena; 18,203	9–9
19	November 25	@ Atlanta	L 123–124	Malik Monk (26)	Marvin Williams (13)	Kemba Walker (9)	State Farm Arena; 12,977	9–10
20	November 26	Milwaukee	W 110–107	Lamb, Walker (21)	Lamb, Williams (8)	Tony Parker (6)	Spectrum Center; 13,805	10–10
21	November 28	Atlanta	W 108–94	Jeremy Lamb (22)	Batum, Kaminsky, Williams (6)	Batum, Parker, Walker (3)	Spectrum Center; 12,971	11–10
22	November 30	Utah	L 111–119	Jeremy Lamb (24)	Marvin Williams (11)	Tony Parker (9)	Spectrum Center; 15,812	11–11

December : 7–7 (home: 6–3; road: 1–4)

Game	Date	Team	Score	High points	High rebounds	High assists	Location Attendance	Record
23	December 2	New Orleans	L 109–119	Frank Kaminsky (19)	Bridges, Hernangómez (8)	Parker, Walker (5)	Spectrum Center; 15,336	11–12
24	December 5	@ Minnesota	L 104–121	Lamb, Batum (18)	Jeremy Lamb (11)	Parker, Walker (5)	Target Center; 11,248	11–13
25	December 7	Denver	W 113–107	Kemba Walker (21)	Marvin Williams (10)	Kemba Walker (8)	Spectrum Center; 13,755	12–13
26	December 9	@ New York	W 119–107	Kemba Walker (25)	Cody Zeller (7)	Kemba Walker (6)	Madison Square Garden; 18,602	13–13
27	December 12	Detroit	W 108–107	Kemba Walker (31)	Marvin Williams (10)	Kemba Walker (9)	Spectrum Center; 13,997	14–13
28	December 14	New York	L 124–126	Butum, Zeller (21)	Cody Zeller (13)	Kemba Walker (10)	Spectrum Center; 17,622	14–14
29	December 15	L.A. Lakers	L 100–128	Malik Monk (19)	Cody Zeller (7)	Devonte' Graham (6)	Spectrum Center; 19,641	14–15
30	December 19	Cleveland	W 110–99	Kemba Walker (30)	Jeremy Lamb (11)	Kemba Walker (6)	Spectrum Center; 15,179	15–15
31	December 21	Detroit	W 98–86	Marvin Williams (24)	Cody Zeller (8)	Kemba Walker (5)	Spectrum Center; 15,812	16–15
32	December 23	@ Boston	L 103–119	Kemba Walker (21)	Willy Hernangómez (10)	Jeremy Lamb (5)	TD Garden; 18,624	16–16
33	December 26	@ Brooklyn	L 132–134 (OT)	Kemba Walker (25)	Marvin Williams (12)	Parker, Walker (5)	Barclays Center; 14,309	16–17
34	December 28	Brooklyn	W 100–87	Kemba Walker (29)	Cody Zeller (10)	Nicolas Batum (5)	Spectrum Center; 19,411	17–17
35	December 29	@ Washington	L 126–130	Kemba Walker (47)	Cody Zeller (9)	Devonte' Graham (5)	Capital One Arena; 17,197	17–18
36	December 31	Orlando	W 125–100	Kemba Walker (24)	Willy Hernangómez (8)	Kemba Walker (7)	Spectrum Center; 14,694	18–18

January : 6–8 (home: 3–1; road: 3–7)

Game	Date	Team	Score	High points	High rebounds	High assists	Location Attendance	Record
37	January 2	Dallas	L 84–122	Kemba Walker (11)	Willy Hernangómez (10)	Kemba Walker (5)	Spectrum Center; 16,955	18–19
38	January 5	@ Denver	L 110–123	Kemba Walker (20)	Bismack Biyombo (12)	Devonte' Graham (5)	Pepsi Center; 19,861	18–20
39	January 6	@ Phoenix	W 119–113	Kemba Walker (29)	Willy Hernangómez (9)	Tony Parker (6)	Talking Stick Resort Arena; 13,110	19–20
40	January 8	@ L.A. Clippers	L 109–128	Malik Monk (24)	Marvin Williams (7)	Kemba Walker (5)	Staples Center; 15,275	19–21
41	January 11	@ Portland	L 96–127	Kemba Walker (18)	Biyombo, Hernangómez (8)	Malik Monk (4)	Moda Center; 19,393	19–22
42	January 12	@ Sacramento	L 97–104	Kemba Walker (31)	Bismack Biyombo (10)	Nicolas Batum (5)	Golden 1 Center; 17,853	19–23
43	January 14	@ San Antonio	W 108–93	Kemba Walker (33)	Lamb, Kidd-Gilchrist (7)	Kemba Walker (5)	AT&T Center; 18,354	20–23
44	January 17	Sacramento	W 114–95	Kemba Walker (23)	Willy Hernangómez (16)	Tony Parker (6)	Spectrum Center; 15,431	21–23
45	January 19	Phoenix	W 135–115	Kemba Walker (21)	Biyombo, Hernangómez (13)	Batum, Lamb (6)	Spectrum Center; 19,278	22–23
46	January 20	@ Indiana	L 95–120	Kemba Walker (23)	Bismack Biyombo (12)	Kemba Walker (7)	Bankers Life Fieldhouse; 15,015	22–24
47	January 23	@ Memphis	W 118–107	Kemba Walker (22)	Bismack Biyombo (10)	Kemba Walker (7)	FedExForum; 12,863	23–24
48	January 25	@ Milwaukee	L 99–108	Nicolas Batum (19)	Walker, Williams (8)	Kemba Walker (5)	Fiserv Forum; 17,803	23–25
49	January 28	New York	W 101–92	Lamb, Parker (15)	Willy Hernangómez (11)	Kemba Walker (5)	Spectrum Center; 13,963	24–25
50	January 30	@ Boston	L 94–126	Kemba Walker (21)	Biyombo, Lamb (5)	Nicolas Batum (4)	TD Garden; 18,624	24–26

February : 4–7 (home: 3–4; road: 1–3)

Game	Date	Team	Score	High points	High rebounds	High assists	Location Attendance	Record
51	February 1	Memphis	W 100–92	Kemba Walker (23)	Nicolas Batum (10)	Tony Parker (7)	Spectrum Center; 15,387	25–26
52	February 2	Chicago	W 125–118	Kemba Walker (37)	Jeremy Lamb (9)	Kemba Walker (10)	Spectrum Center; 19,114	26–26
53	February 5	L.A. Clippers	L 115–117	Kemba Walker (32)	Cody Zeller (11)	Kemba Walker (9)	Spectrum Center; 14,300	26–27
54	February 6	@ Dallas	L 93–99	Kemba Walker (30)	Cody Zeller (13)	Kemba Walker (6)	American Airlines Center; 19,606	26–28
55	February 9	@ Atlanta	W 129–120	Kemba Walker (37)	Cody Zeller (8)	Nicolas Batum (8)	State Farm Arena; 15,048	27–28
56	February 11	@ Indiana	L 90–99	Kemba Walker (34)	Marvin Williams (11)	Batum, Walker, Zeller (3)	Bankers Life Fieldhouse; 15,734	27–29
57	February 14	@ Orlando	L 89–127	Malik Monk (15)	Marvin Williams (8)	Devonte' Graham (4)	Amway Center; 18,846	27–30
58	February 22	Washington	W 123–110	Kemba Walker (27)	Williams, Zeller (9)	Kemba Walker (11)	Spectrum Center; 15,572	28–30
59	February 23	Brooklyn	L 115–117	Kemba Walker (32)	Cody Zeller (11)	Tony Parker (5)	Spectrum Center; 19,158	28–31
60	February 25	Golden State	L 110–121	Cody Zeller (28)	Cody Zeller (9)	Jeremy Lamb (7)	Spectrum Center; 19,419	28–32
61	February 27	Houston	L 113–118	Kemba Walker (35)	Jeremy Lamb (14)	Batum, Lamb (6)	Spectrum Center; 17,903	28–33

March : 7–8 (home: 4–3; road: 3–5)

Game	Date	Team	Score	High points	High rebounds	High assists	Location Attendance	Record
62	March 1	@ Brooklyn	W 123–112	Kemba Walker (25)	Cody Zeller (9)	Kemba Walker (7)	Barclays Center; 15,578	29–33
63	March 3	Portland	L 108–118	Jeremy Lamb (23)	Bismack Biyombo (9)	Kemba Walker (12)	Spectrum Center; 18,355	29–34
64	March 6	Miami	L 84–91	Kaminsky, Walker (20)	Cody Zeller (10)	Kemba Walker (7)	Spectrum Center; 18,137	29–35
65	March 8	Washington	W 112–111	Marvin Williams (30)	Jeremy Lamb (10)	Kemba Walker (6)	Spectrum Center; 18,144	30–35
66	March 9	@ Milwaukee	L 114–131	Kemba Walker (25)	Batum, M. Williams (8)	Batum, Kaminsky, Walker (4)	Fiserv Forum; 17,966	30–36
67	March 11	@ Houston	L 106–118	Kemba Walker (40)	Kemba Walker (10)	Kemba Walker (7)	Toyota Center; 18,055	30–37
68	March 15	@ Washington	W 116–110	Kemba Walker (28)	Jeremy Lamb (8)	Nicolas Batum (6)	Capital One Arena; 19,520	31–37
69	March 17	@ Miami	L 75–93	Jeremy Lamb (21)	Batum, Kaminsky (7)	Kemba Walker (4)	American Airlines Arena; 19,600	31–38
70	March 19	Philadelphia	L 114–118	Jeremy Lamb (26)	Jeremy Lamb (11)	Kemba Walker (4)	Spectrum Center; 16,411	31–39
71	March 21	Minnesota	W 113–106	Kemba Walker (31)	Miles Bridges (12)	Kemba Walker (6)	Spectrum Center; 15,576	32–39
72	March 23	Boston	W 124–117	Kemba Walker (36)	Kemba Walker (11)	Kemba Walker (9)	Spectrum Center; 19,438	33–39
73	March 24	@ Toronto	W 115–114	Dwayne Bacon (24)	Willy Hernangómez (10)	Kemba Walker (13)	Scotiabank Arena; 19,800	34–39
74	March 26	San Antonio	W 125–116 (OT)	Kemba Walker (38)	Frank Kaminsky (10)	Kemba Walker (11)	Spectrum Center; 14,227	35–39
75	March 29	@ L.A. Lakers	L 115–129	Kemba Walker (24)	Bismack Biyombo (9)	Kemba Walker (6)	Staples Center; 18,997	35–40
76	March 31	@ Golden State	L 90–137	Willy Hernangómez (22)	Hernangómez, Bridges (5)	Jeremy Lamb (5)	Oracle Arena; 19,596	35–41

April : 4–2 (home: 1–1; road: 3–1)

Game	Date	Team	Score	High points	High rebounds	High assists	Location Attendance	Record
77	April 1	@ Utah	L 102–111	Kemba Walker (47)	Willy Hernangómez (8)	Devonte' Graham (6)	Vivint Smart Home Arena; 18,306	35–42
78	April 3	@ New Orleans	W 115–109	Kemba Walker (32)	Bismack Biyombo (9)	Kemba Walker (7)	Smoothie King Center; 16,844	36–42
79	April 5	Toronto	W 113–111	Kemba Walker (29)	Frank Kaminsky (13)	Kemba Walker (8)	Spectrum Center; 18,684	37–42
80	April 7	@ Detroit	W 104–91	Kemba Walker (31)	Bismack Biyombo (9)	Kemba Walker (7)	Little Caesars Arena; 19,871	38–42
81	April 9	@ Cleveland	W 124–97	Walker, Lamb (23)	Miles Bridges (7)	Kemba Walker (7)	Rocket Mortgage FieldHouse; 19,432	39–42
82	April 10	Orlando	L 114–122	Kemba Walker (43)	Jeremy Lamb (8)	Kemba Walker (5)	Spectrum Center; 17,719	39–43

2018–19 season schedule

== Standings ==
Southeast Division	W	L	PCT	GB	Home	Road	Div	GP
y – Orlando Magic	42	40	.512	–	25‍–‍16	17‍–‍24	10–6	82
Charlotte Hornets	39	43	.476	3.0	25‍–‍16	14‍–‍27	10–6	82
Miami Heat	39	43	.476	3.0	19‍–‍22	20‍–‍21	7–9	82
Washington Wizards	32	50	.390	10.0	22‍–‍19	10‍–‍31	7–9	82
Atlanta Hawks	29	53	.354	13.0	17‍–‍24	12‍–‍29	6–10	82

Eastern Conference
#	Team	W	L	PCT	GB	GP
1	z – Milwaukee Bucks *	60	22	.732	–	82
2	y – Toronto Raptors *	58	24	.707	2.0	82
3	x – Philadelphia 76ers	51	31	.622	9.0	82
4	x – Boston Celtics	49	33	.598	11.0	82
5	x – Indiana Pacers	48	34	.585	12.0	82
6	x – Brooklyn Nets	42	40	.512	18.0	82
7	y – Orlando Magic *	42	40	.512	18.0	82
8	x – Detroit Pistons	41	41	.500	19.0	82
9	Charlotte Hornets	39	43	.476	21.0	82
10	Miami Heat	39	43	.476	21.0	82
11	Washington Wizards	32	50	.390	28.0	82
12	Atlanta Hawks	29	53	.354	31.0	82
13	Chicago Bulls	22	60	.268	38.0	82
14	Cleveland Cavaliers	19	63	.232	41.0	82
15	New York Knicks	17	65	.207	43.0	82

== Player statistics ==
=== Regular season ===
Player	POS	GP	GS	MP	REB	AST	STL	BLK	PTS	MPG	RPG	APG	SPG	BPG	PPG
Kemba Walker	PG	82	82	2,863	361	484	102	34	2,102	34.9	4.4	5.9	1.2	.4	25.6
Miles Bridges	SF	80	25	1,696	323	95	55	49	597	21.2	4.0	1.2	.7	.6	7.5
Jeremy Lamb	SG	79	55	2,250	434	172	88	32	1,208	28.5	5.5	2.2	1.1	.4	15.3
Marvin Williams	PF	75	75	2,133	407	92	71	61	756	28.4	5.4	1.2	.9	.8	10.1
Nicolas Batum	SF	75	72	2,354	390	247	71	43	699	31.4	5.2	3.3	.9	.6	9.3
Malik Monk	SG	73	0	1,258	137	117	37	19	653	17.2	1.9	1.6	.5	.3	8.9
Michael Kidd-Gilchrist	PF	64	3	1,179	246	61	32	39	427	18.4	3.8	1.0	.5	.6	6.7
Willy Hernangómez	C	58	3	812	311	60	16	20	421	14.0	5.4	1.0	.3	.3	7.3
Tony Parker	PG	56	0	1,003	83	207	21	7	530	17.9	1.5	3.7	.4	.1	9.5
Bismack Biyombo	C	54	32	783	247	33	11	41	236	14.5	4.6	.6	.2	.8	4.4
Cody Zeller	C	49	47	1,243	333	102	38	41	497	25.4	6.8	2.1	.8	.8	10.1
Frank Kaminsky	C	47	0	755	163	63	12	12	405	16.1	3.5	1.3	.3	.3	8.6
Devonte' Graham	PG	46	3	676	63	121	23	2	217	14.7	1.4	2.6	.5	.0	4.7
Dwayne Bacon	SG	43	13	759	89	47	12	5	316	17.7	2.1	1.1	.3	.1	7.3
Shelvin Mack^{†}	PG	4	0	42	2	1	2	0	9	10.5	.5	.3	.5	.0	2.3
J. P. Macura	SG	2	0	17	3	2	0	0	6	8.5	1.5	1.0	.0	.0	3.0
Joe Chealey	PG	1	0	8	0	1	0	0	2	8.0	.0	1.0	.0	.0	2.0

- ^{†} Denotes player spent time with another team in the season. Stats reflect time with the Hornets only.

== Transactions ==
=== Trades ===
June 21, 2018	To Charlotte Hornets Draft rights to Miles Bridges; Two future second-round picks	To Los Angeles Clippers Draft rights to Shai Gilgeous-Alexander
June 21, 2018	To Charlotte Hornets Draft rights to Devonte' Graham	To Atlanta Hawks 2019 second-round pick 2023 second-round pick
July 6, 2018	To Charlotte Hornets Timofey Mozgov; Draft rights to Hamidou Diallo; 2021 second-round pick Cash considerations	To Brooklyn Nets Dwight Howard
July 6, 2018	To Charlotte Hornets 2019 second-round pick Cash considerations	To Oklahoma City Thunder Draft rights to Hamidou Diallo
July 7, 2018	To Charlotte Hornets Bismack Biyombo (from Orlando); 2019 second-round pick (from Orlando); 2020 second-round pick (from Orlando)	To Chicago Bulls Julyan Stone (from Charlotte)
July 7, 2018	To Orlando Magic Jerian Grant (from Chicago); Timofey Mozgov (from Charlotte)	

=== Free agents ===
==== Additions ====
Player	Signed	Former team
J. P. Macura	Two-way contract	Xavier Musketeers
Tony Parker	2-year contract worth $10 million	San Antonio Spurs
Jaylen Barford	July 26, 2018	Arkansas Razorbacks
Zach Smith	July 26, 2018	Texas Tech Red Raiders
Isaiah Wilkins	July 26, 2018	Virginia Cavaliers
Joe Chealey	July 27, 2018	College of Charleston Cougars

==== Subtractions ====
Player	Reason left	New team
Michael Carter-Williams		Houston Rockets
Marcus Paige	Unrestricted free agent	(Serbia) Partizan Belgrade
Treveon Graham		Brooklyn Nets
Mangok Mathiang	Waived	(Italy) Vanoli Cremona
