= Jason Smith (basketball, born 1986) =

American basketball player (born 1986)

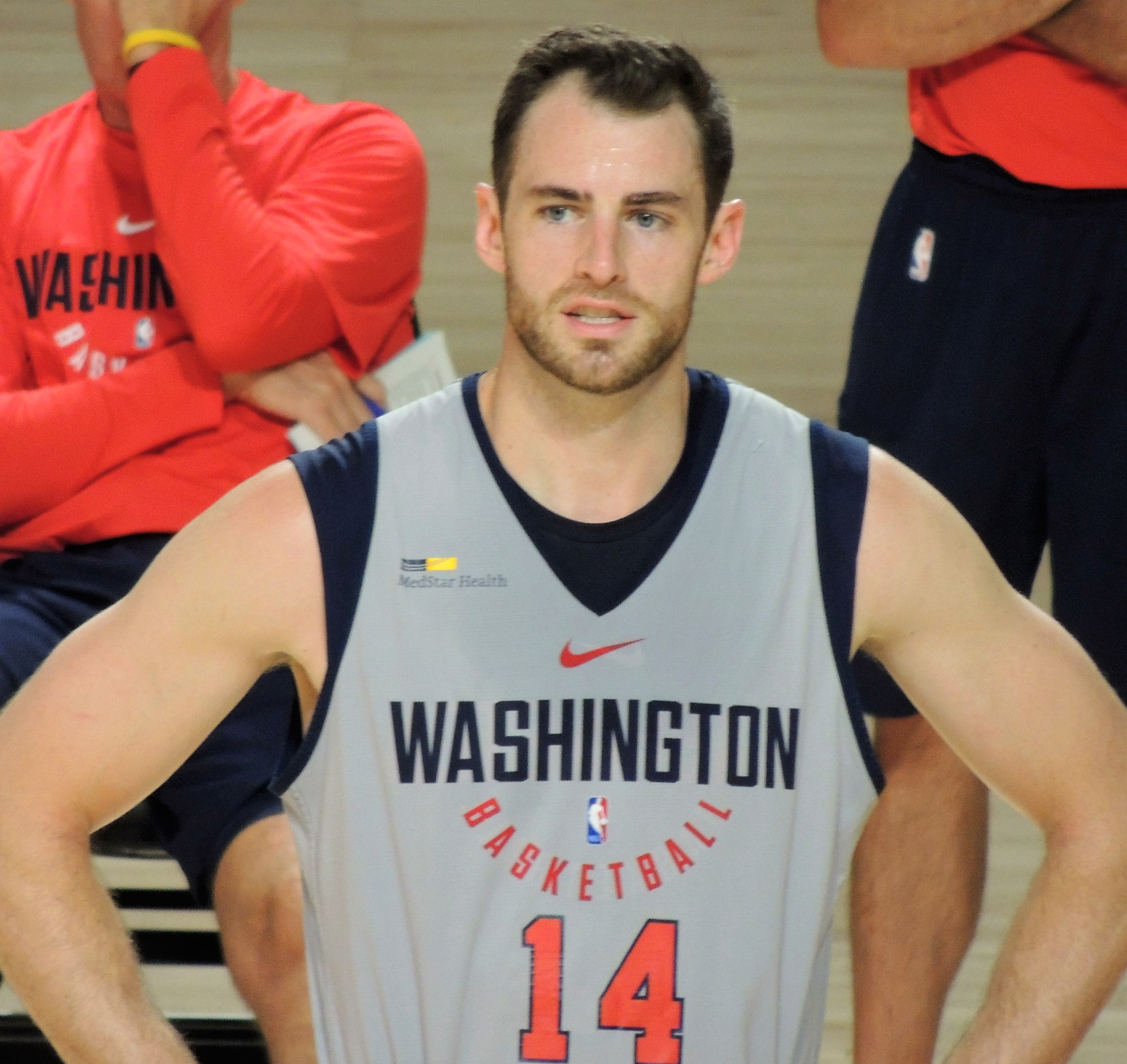
- Smith during 2017 Washington Wizards training camp

Personal information
- Born: March 2, 1986 (age 40) Greeley, Colorado, U.S.
- Listed height: 7 ft 0 in (2.13 m)
- Listed weight: 240 lb (109 kg)

Career information
- High school: Platte Valley (Kersey, Colorado)
- College: Colorado State (2004–2007)
- NBA draft: 2007: 1st round, 20th overall pick
- Drafted by: Miami Heat
- Playing career: 2007–2019
- Position: Center / power forward
- Number: 14, 20

Career history
- 2007–2010: Philadelphia 76ers
- 2010–2014: New Orleans Hornets/Pelicans
- 2014–2015: New York Knicks
- 2015–2016: Orlando Magic
- 2016–2018: Washington Wizards
- 2018–2019: Milwaukee Bucks
- 2019: New Orleans Pelicans

Career highlights
- 2× First-team All-MWC (2006, 2007)

Career NBA statistics
- Points: 3,777 (6.1 ppg)
- Rebounds: 2,075 (3.4 rpg)
- Blocks: 408 (0.7 bpg)
- Stats at NBA.com
- Stats at Basketball Reference

Jason Victor Smith (born March 2, 1986) is an American former professional basketball player who played twelve seasons in the National Basketball Association. He played college basketball for the Colorado State Rams before being selected with the 20th overall pick in the 2007 NBA draft by the Miami Heat.

== High school career ==
Smith attended Platte Valley High School in Kersey, Colorado where he was regarded as the state's premier prep player during his senior season in 2003–04. He was a two-time state player of the year, was named to the All-Colorado team as a junior and senior, was a three-year letterwinner and starter for the Broncos, was named to all-conference and all-state teams three times, and was selected as most outstanding player in state Class 3A tournament as a senior.

== College career ==
As a freshman at Colorado State in 2004–05, Smith was named the Mountain West Freshman of the Year and earned all-MWC honorable mention honors. In 26 games (11 starts), he averaged 10.5 points on 55.4 percent shooting (103-of-186) with 5.8 rebounds, 1.7 assists and 1.4 blocked shots in 24.4 minutes per game.

As a sophomore in 2005–06, Smith played in and started all 31 games for the Rams, and the season's end, he earned first-team All-Mountain West and second-team NABC all-district honors. On the season, he averaged 16.2 points on 51.7 percent shooting (178-of-344) with 7.3 rebounds, 2.3 assists and 2.1 blocked shots in 28.7 minutes per game.

As a junior in 2006–07, Smith earned first-team All-Mountain West honors for a second straight year after he led the MWC in rebounding (10.1 rpg, ranked ninth nationally) and ranked sixth in scoring (16.8 ppg).

On April 3, 2007, Smith declared for the NBA draft, forgoing his final year of college eligibility. He left Colorado State ranking ninth on the school's all-time leading scoring list with 1,281 points. He also ranked sixth in rebounds (683) and fifth in blocked shots (149), while his 24 career double-doubles was the second-most in school history.

== Professional career ==
=== Philadelphia 76ers (2007–2010) ===
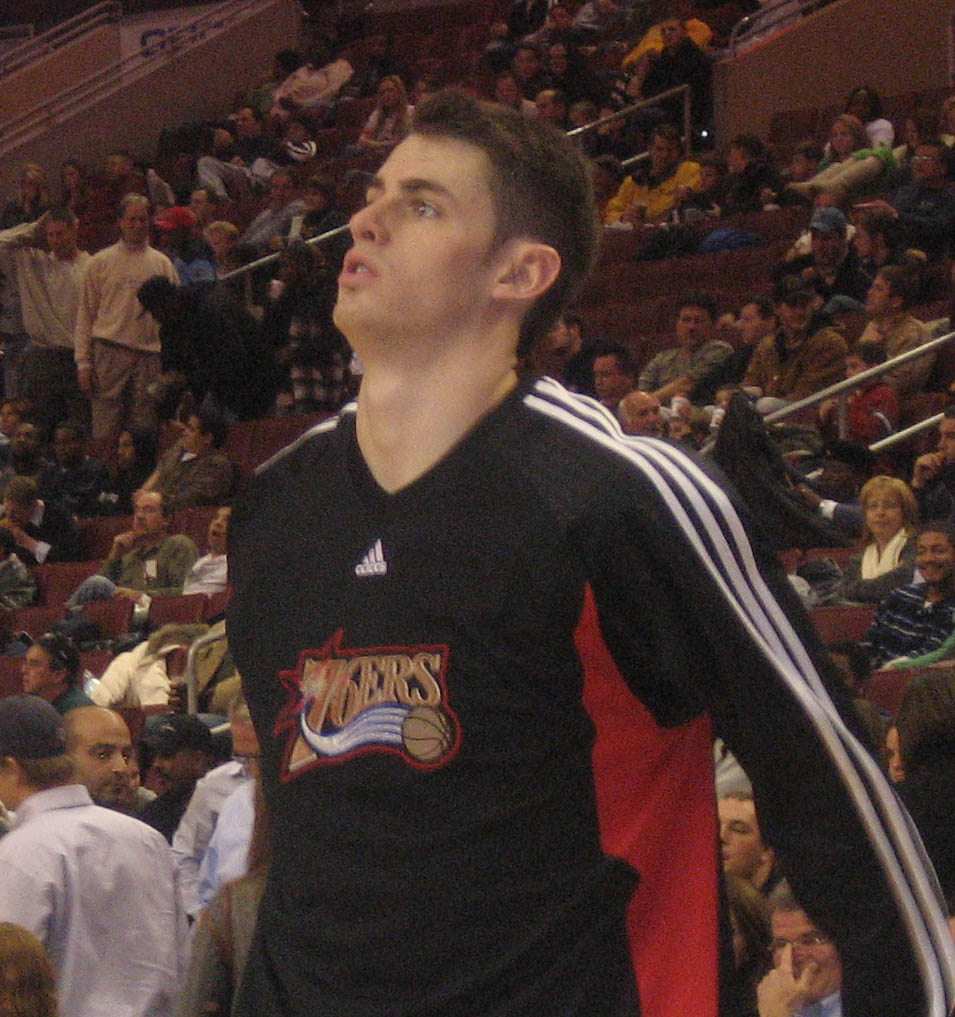
Smith with the 76ers in December 2007

Smith was selected by the Miami Heat with the 20th overall pick in the 2007 NBA draft, but was later traded to the Philadelphia 76ers on draft night. As a rookie with the 76ers, Smith averaged 4.5 points and 3.0 rebounds in 76 games. In August 2008, he tore the anterior cruciate ligament in his left knee. He subsequently missed the entire 2008–09 season. Smith returned to action in 2009–10, playing in 56 games and averaging 3.4 points and 2.4 rebounds per game.

=== New Orleans Hornets/Pelicans (2010–2014) ===
On September 23, 2010, Smith was traded, along with Willie Green, to the New Orleans Hornets in exchange for Darius Songaila and Craig Brackins. On February 1, 2011, he scored a career-high 20 points in a 97–89 win over the Washington Wizards. In 77 games, he averaged 4.3 points and 3.1 rebounds per game.

On December 17, 2011, Smith re-signed with the Hornets to a three-year, $7.5 million contract. He missed over a month of action between February 4 and March 17 due to a concussion suffered on February 4 against the Detroit Pistons. On April 7, 2012, he scored a career-high 26 points in a 99–90 win over the Minnesota Timberwolves. He appeared in 40 games and made 29 starts while averaging a career-high 9.9 points and 4.9 rebounds in the lockout-shortened 2011–12 season.

Smith managed just 51 games in 2012–13 due to a right labrum injury that forced him to miss seven games in December. Smith later missed the final 24 games of the season after having season-ending surgery to repair it. In April 2013, the Hornets were renamed the Pelicans.

In 2013–14, Smith was limited to 31 games due to season-ending knee injury in January 2014.

=== New York Knicks (2014–2015) ===
On July 18, 2014, Smith signed a one-year, $3.3 million contract with the New York Knicks. On February 7, 2015, Smith grabbed a season-high 13 rebounds against the Golden State Warriors. On February 11, 2015, Smith scored a season-high 25 points on 10-of-16 shooting in an 89–83 loss to the Orlando Magic. He appeared in all 82 games for the first time in his career and made a career-high 31 starts.

=== Orlando Magic (2015–2016) ===
On July 14, 2015, Smith signed a one-year, $4.5 million contract with the Orlando Magic. On March 15, 2016, he set season highs with 25 points and 13 rebounds in a 116–110 win over the Denver Nuggets.

=== Washington Wizards (2016–2018) ===
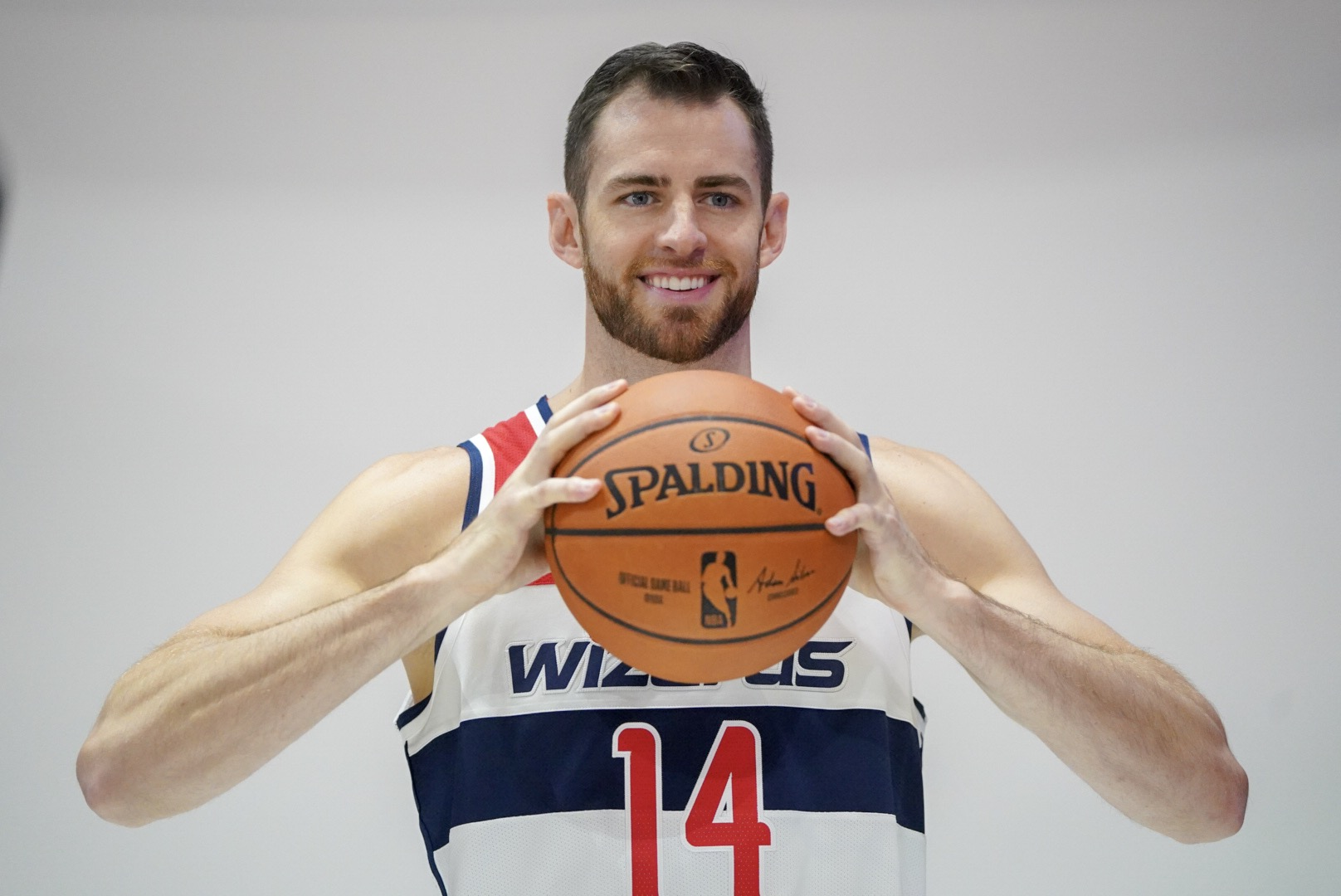
Jason Smith (2018)

On July 7, 2016, Smith signed a three-year, $16 million contract to the Washington Wizards. He scored a season-high 17 points three times during the 2016–17 season. The 2017–18 season saw Smith appear in just 33 games.

=== Milwaukee Bucks (2018–2019) ===
On December 7, 2018, Smith was traded to the Milwaukee Bucks in a five-player, three-team deal.

=== Return to New Orleans (2019) ===
On February 7, 2019, Smith was acquired by the New Orleans Pelicans in a three-team trade involving the Bucks and Detroit Pistons. On March 20, 2019, he was waived by the Pelicans after appearing in two games.

== Career statistics ==
Legend
GP	Games played	GS	Games started	MPG	Minutes per game
FG%	Field goal percentage	3P%	3-point field goal percentage	FT%	Free throw percentage
RPG	Rebounds per game	APG	Assists per game	SPG	Steals per game
BPG	Blocks per game	PPG	Points per game	**Bold**	Career high

=== NBA ===
==== Regular season ====
Year	Team	GP	GS	MPG	FG%	3P%	FT%	RPG	APG	SPG	BPG	PPG
2007–08	Philadelphia	76	1	14.6	.455	.286	.659	3.0	.3	.3	.7	4.5
2009–10	Philadelphia	56	2	11.8	.431	.345	.690	2.4	.6	.4	.5	3.4
2010–11	New Orleans	77	6	14.3	.443	.000	.843	3.1	.5	.3	.4	4.3
2011–12	New Orleans	40	29	23.7	.520	.111	.702	4.9	.9	**.5**	**1.0**	**9.9**
2012–13	New Orleans	51	0	17.2	.490	.000	.843	3.6	.7	.3	.9	8.2
2013–14	New Orleans	31	27	**26.8**	.465	–	.780	**5.8**	.9	.4	.9	9.7
2014–15	New York	**82**	**31**	21.8	.434	.357	.830	4.0	**1.7**	.4	.5	8.0
2015–16	Orlando	76	2	15.5	.485	.250	.806	2.9	.8	.4	.9	7.2
2016–17	Washington	74	3	14.4	**.529**	**.474**	.686	3.5	.5	.3	.7	5.7
2017–18	Washington	33	2	8.6	.391	.125	.905	1.6	.4	.1	.4	3.4
2018–19	Washington	12	1	10.8	.405	.400	.833	3.1	1.0	.1	.4	3.7
2018–19	Milwaukee	6	0	6.7	.308	.333	**1.000**	1.8	.2	.3	.3	2.2
2018–19	New Orleans	2	0	10.0	.222	.286	**1.000**	2.0	.5	.0	.0	4.0
Career		616	104	16.3	.468	.333	.783	3.4	.7	.3	.7	6.1

==== Playoffs ====
Year	Team	GP	GS	MPG	FG%	3P%	FT%	RPG	APG	SPG	BPG	PPG
2008	Philadelphia	6	0	**13.7**	.444	.000	**1.000**	**2.5**	**.5**	.2	**.8**	3.3
2011	New Orleans	6	0	9.7	.467	–	–	1.2	.2	**.3**	.0	2.3
2017	Washington	**13**	0	12.1	**.487**	**.300**	.714	2.2	.3	.2	.5	**3.9**
2018	Washington	1	0	2.0	–	–	–	.0	.0	.0	.0	.0
Career		26	0	11.5	.472	.273	.778	2.0	.3	.2	.5	3.3

=== College ===
Year	Team	GP	GS	MPG	FG%	3P%	FT%	RPG	APG	SPG	BPG	PPG
2004–05	Colorado State	26	11	24.4	.554	.250	.684	5.8	1.7	.4	1.4	10.5
2005–06	Colorado State	**31**	**31**	28.7	.517	**.455**	.763	7.3	**2.3**	**.6**	**2.1**	16.2
2006–07	Colorado State	30	28	**30.2**	**.579**	.000	**.770**	**10.1**	1.9	.5	1.6	**16.8**
Career		87	70	27.9	.548	.308	.751	7.9	2.0	.5	1.7	14.7
