= Jeremy Lamb =

American basketball player (born 1992)

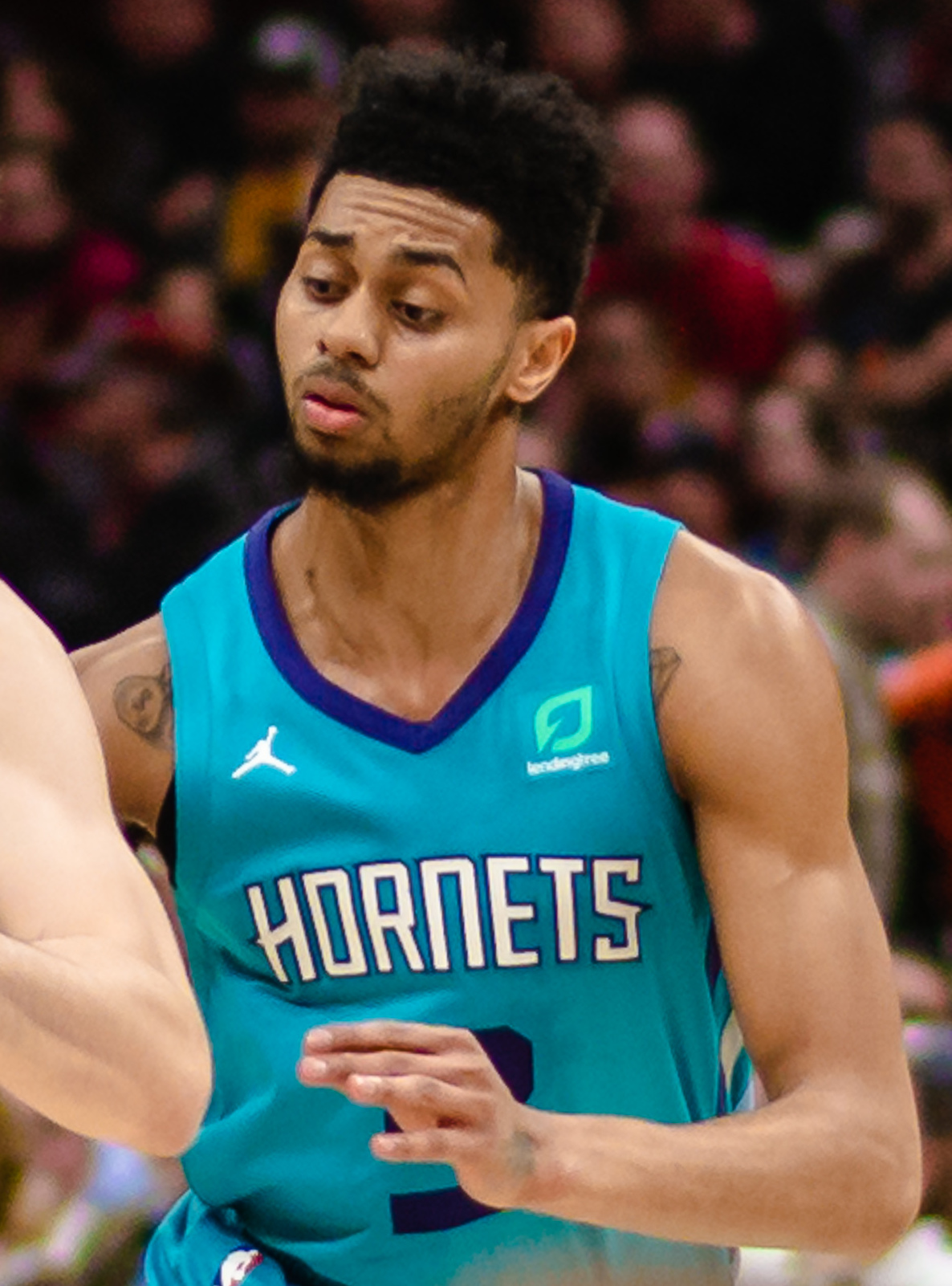
- Lamb with the Charlotte Hornets in 2019

Personal information
- Born: May 30, 1992 (age 34) Henrico, Virginia, U.S.
- Listed height: 6 ft 5 in (1.96 m)
- Listed weight: 180 lb (82 kg)

Career information
- High school: Norcross (Norcross, Georgia)
- College: UConn (2010–2012)
- NBA draft: 2012: 1st round, 12th overall pick
- Drafted by: Houston Rockets
- Playing career: 2012–2024
- Position: Shooting guard / small forward
- Number: 3, 11, 26, 2

Career history
- 2012–2015: Oklahoma City Thunder
- 2012–2013: →Tulsa 66ers
- 2015–2019: Charlotte Hornets
- 2019–2022: Indiana Pacers
- 2022: Sacramento Kings
- 2023–2024: Stockton Kings

Career highlights
- NCAA champion (2011); First-team All-Big East (2012)
- Stats at NBA.com
- Stats at Basketball Reference

Jeremy "Fly Guy" Emmanuel Lamb (born May 30, 1992) is an American former professional basketball player. He played college basketball for the UConn Huskies, where he was the second-leading scorer on the 2011 national champion UConn Huskies team as a freshman. Lamb was drafted by the Houston Rockets in the first round of the 2012 NBA Draft.

== High school career ==
Lamb attended Norcross High School in Norcross, Georgia, where he captained the basketball team and averaged 20 points and six rebounds per game, leading Norcross to the regional championship, the Elite 8 of the state playoffs and a final record of 27–3. Lamb was recruited by UConn after drawing the attention of coach Jim Calhoun, who felt that Lamb reminded him of former UConn star Richard "Rip" Hamilton.

Considered a four-star recruit by Rivals.com, Lamb was listed as the No. 19 shooting guard and the No. 76 player in the nation in 2010.

== College career ==
As a freshman at UConn, Lamb played in every game. He averaged 11.1 points per game, which was second on the team behind Kemba Walker. Lamb scored a career-high 24 points against Marquette on January 25, 2011. In the 2011 Big East tournament, he averaged 14.2 points and helped the #9-seeded Huskies win the tournament and earn the #3-seed in the NCAA tournament.

In the 2011 NCAA Tournament, Lamb increased his scoring output to 16.2 points per game and tied his career-high with 24 points against San Diego State in the Sweet 16. Preceding UConn's Final Four game against Kentucky, Lamb was 11-for-15 from three-point range in the NCAA Tournament, the highest all-time percentage by a player who has reached the Final Four. During the national title game, he scored 12 points and grabbed 7 rebounds as the Huskies defeated Butler by a score of 53–41.

Following the season, Lamb was invited to the 17-man tryouts for the 12-man FIBA Under-19 World Cup team by USA Basketball, and was ultimately selected to be a part of the team. The 12 selected players competed as Team USA in the 2011 FIBA U19 World Cup in Latvia. Lamb was the only American player selected to the five-man All-Tournament Team.

The 2012 basketball season was a bitter disappointment for both Lamb and UConn. Despite their overall talent, they failed to meet expectations after suffering a losing record in Big East play during the regular season and bowing out in the first round of the NCAA Tournament after losing to Iowa State University. Following the 2012 season, Lamb declared for the NBA draft.

== Professional career ==
=== Oklahoma City Thunder (2012–2015) ===
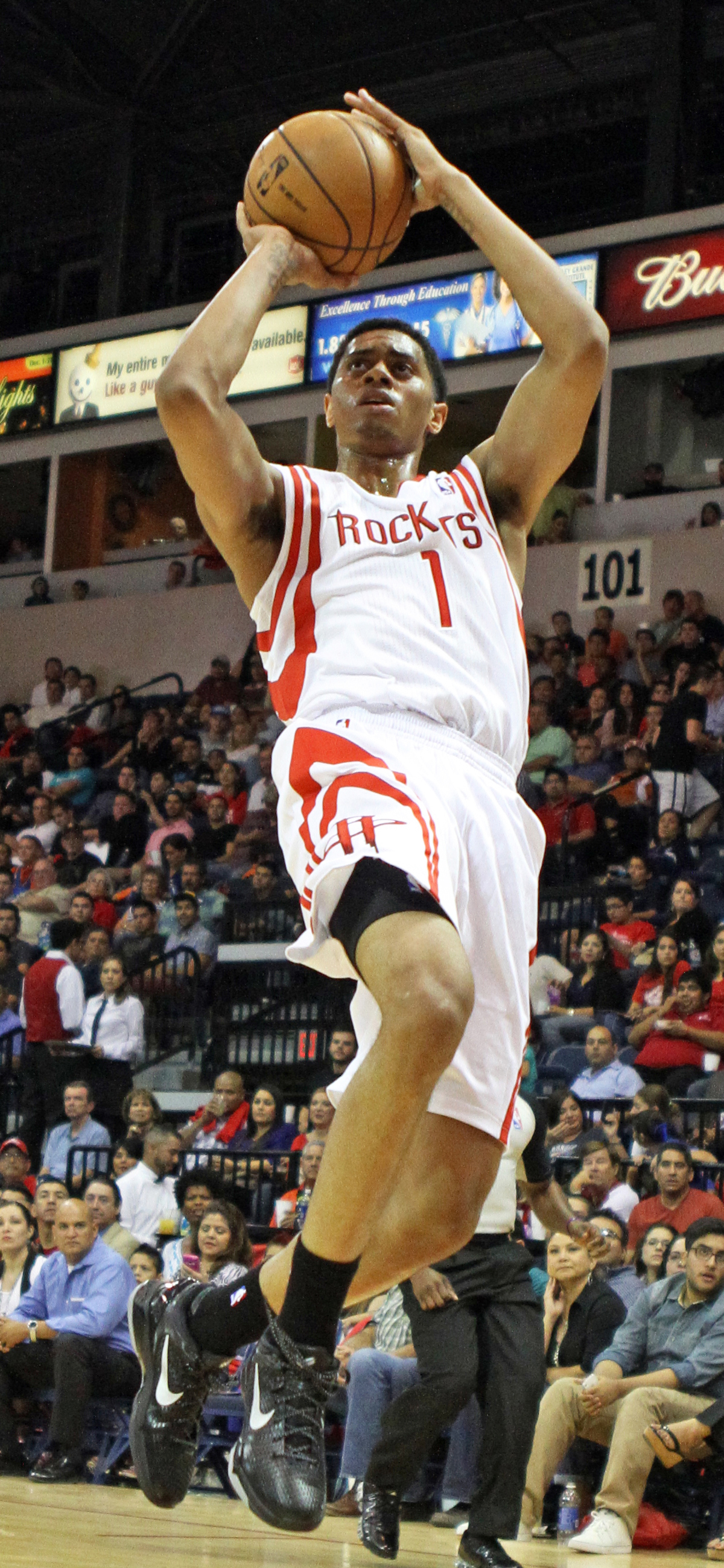
Lamb in 2012

Lamb was selected with the 12th overall pick in the 2012 NBA draft by the Houston Rockets. On October 27, 2012, he was traded to the Oklahoma City Thunder along with Kevin Martin, two first-round draft picks, and a second-round draft pick, in exchange for James Harden, Cole Aldrich, Lazar Hayward and Daequan Cook.

As a rookie, Lamb had several assignments with the Tulsa 66ers of the NBA Development League. On February 4, 2013, he was named to the Futures All-Star roster for the 2013 NBA D-League All-Star Game. However, Lamb was replaced by Tony Mitchell because he was later recalled by the Thunder and thus was not an "active" player on a D-League roster at the time of the game.

On December 29, 2013, Lamb scored a then career-high 22 points in a 117–86 victory over the Rockets. On November 14, 2014, he recorded his first career double-double with career-highs of 24 points and 10 rebounds in a loss to the Detroit Pistons.

=== Charlotte Hornets (2015–2019) ===
On June 25, 2015, Lamb was traded to the Charlotte Hornets in exchange for Luke Ridnour and a 2016 second-round draft pick. On November 2, he signed a three-year, $21 million contract extension with the Hornets. The following day, Lamb scored a season-high 20 points on 9-of-10 shooting in a 130–105 victory over the Chicago Bulls. He surpassed that mark on January 4, 2016, scoring 22 points in a 111–101 loss to the Golden State Warriors.

On November 26, 2016, after recovering from a hamstring injury that sidelined him for 10 games, Lamb made his first start for the Hornets and had a career-best game with 18 points and a career-high 17 rebounds in a 107–102 victory over the New York Knicks. Lamb set a season high in points for a second straight game two days later, recording 21 points and nine rebounds off the bench in a 104–85 victory over the Memphis Grizzlies.

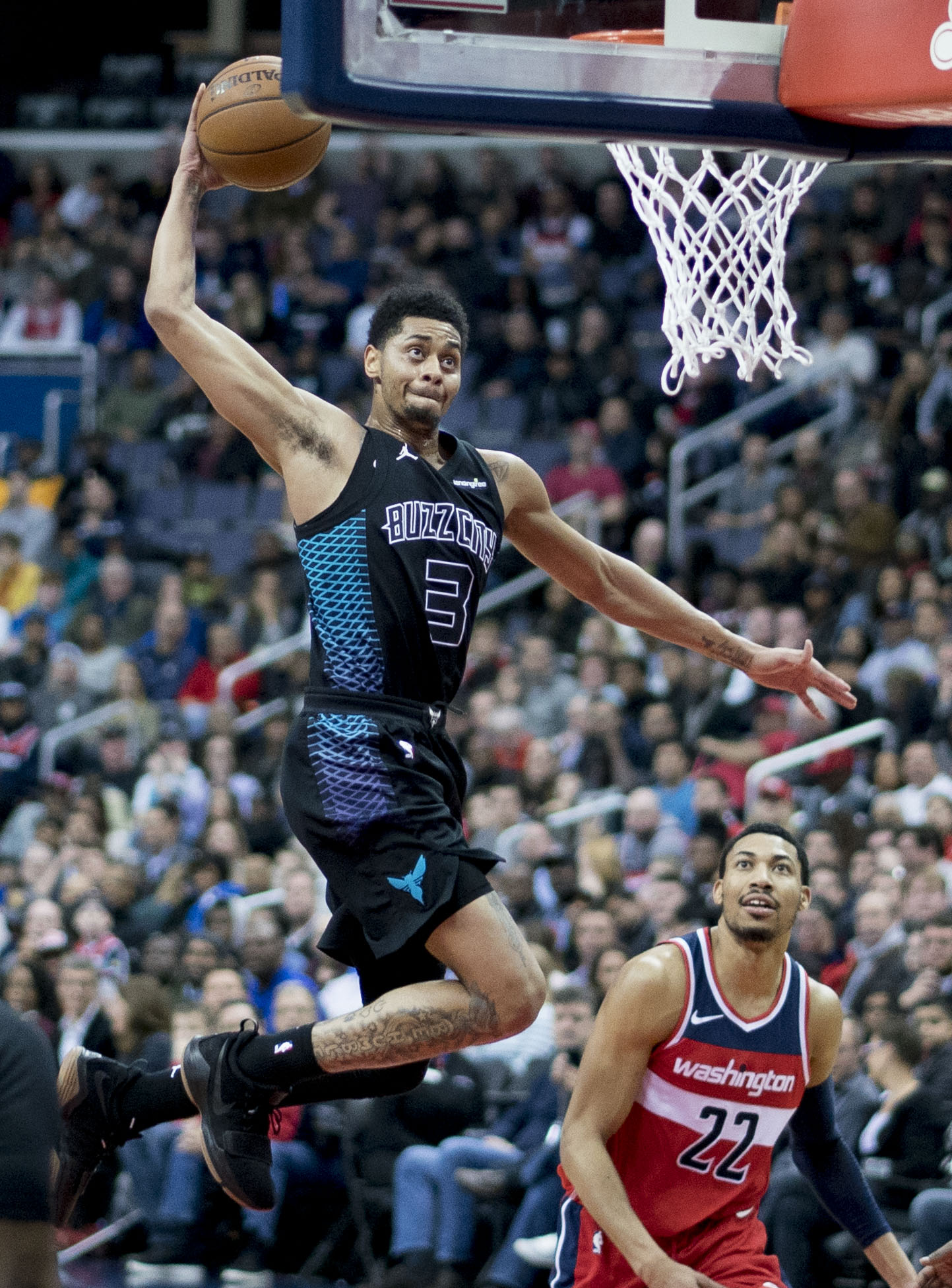
Lamb in February 2018

On December 20, 2017, Lamb scored a career-high 32 points on 11-of-17 shooting in a 129–111 loss to the Toronto Raptors with 19 of those points coming in 15 first-half minutes.

Prior to the start of the 2018–19 season, Lamb was named the team's starting shooting guard. On November 21, he had 21 points on a career-high five three-pointers in a 127–109 victory over the Indiana Pacers. On December 26, Lamb scored 31 points in a 134–132 double-overtime loss to the Brooklyn Nets. On March 24, 2019, he had 13 points and two blocks while making a half-court shot at the buzzer to give the Hornets to a narrow 115–114 victory over the Raptors. It was the second-longest game-winning buzzer-beater in the previous 20 seasons. On April 5, Lamb had 22 points, five rebounds, four assists, and three steals while hitting another game-winning three-pointer against the Raptors, this time with 3.3 seconds remaining to give the Hornets to a 113–111 victory.

=== Indiana Pacers (2019–2022) ===
On July 7, 2019, Lamb signed a three-year contract worth $31.5 million with the Indiana Pacers. On February 24, 2020, the Indiana Pacers announced that Lamb had sustained a torn ACL, a torn lateral meniscus, and a lateral femoral condylar fracture during a 127–81 blowout loss to the Toronto Raptors the previous night, sidelining Lamb for the rest of the 2019–20 season.

=== Sacramento Kings (2022) ===
On February 8, 2022, Lamb was traded, alongside Justin Holiday, Domantas Sabonis and a 2023 second-round pick, to the Sacramento Kings in exchange for Tyrese Haliburton, Buddy Hield and Tristan Thompson. He made his Kings debut the next day, recording 14 points, six rebounds, five assists, and two blocks in a 132–119 victory over the Minnesota Timberwolves.

=== Stockton Kings (2023–2024) ===
On October 2, 2023, Lamb re-signed with Sacramento, but was waived exactly a week later. On November 9, he was named to the opening night roster for the Stockton Kings. On March 10, 2024, it was announced that Lamb had suffered a season-ending ankle injury while playing for Stockton.

=== Retirement ===
On August 7, 2024, Lamb announced his retirement from professional basketball.

== Career statistics ==
Legend
| GP | Games played | GS | Games started | MPG | Minutes per game |
| FG% | Field goal percentage | 3P% | 3-point field goal percentage | FT% | Free throw percentage |
| RPG | Rebounds per game | APG | Assists per game | SPG | Steals per game |
| BPG | Blocks per game | PPG | Points per game | **Bold** | Career high |

=== NBA ===
==== Regular season ====
| Year | Team | GP | GS | MPG | FG% | 3P% | FT% | RPG | APG | SPG | BPG | PPG |
|---|---|---|---|---|---|---|---|---|---|---|---|---|
| 2012–13 | Oklahoma City | 23 | 0 | 6.4 | .353 | .300 | **1.000** | .8 | .2 | .1 | .1 | 3.1 |
| 2013–14 | Oklahoma City | 78 | 0 | 19.7 | .432 | .356 | .797 | 2.4 | 1.5 | .7 | .3 | 8.5 |
| 2014–15 | Oklahoma City | 47 | 8 | 13.5 | .416 | .342 | .891 | 2.3 | .9 | .4 | .1 | 6.3 |
| 2015–16 | Charlotte | 66 | 0 | 18.6 | .451 | .309 | .727 | 3.8 | 1.2 | .6 | .5 | 8.8 |
| 2016–17 | Charlotte | 62 | 5 | 18.4 | **.460** | .281 | .853 | 4.3 | 1.2 | .4 | .4 | 9.7 |
| 2017–18 | Charlotte | **80** | 18 | 24.6 | .457 | .370 | .861 | 4.1 | **2.3** | .8 | .4 | 12.9 |
| 2018–19 | Charlotte | 79 | **55** | **28.5** | .440 | .348 | .888 | **5.5** | 2.2 | 1.1 | .4 | **15.3** |
| 2019–20 | Indiana | 46 | 42 | 28.1 | .451 | .335 | .836 | 4.3 | 2.1 | **1.2** | .5 | 12.5 |
| 2020–21 | Indiana | 36 | 8 | 21.3 | .435 | **.406** | .947 | 3.6 | 1.5 | .9 | **.6** | 10.1 |
| 2021–22 | Indiana | 39 | 0 | 15.7 | .373 | .333 | .838 | 2.4 | 1.3 | .6 | .4 | 7.1 |
| 2021–22 | Sacramento | 17 | 0 | 18.9 | .403 | .302 | .846 | 3.5 | 1.8 | .5 | .5 | 7.9 |
| Career | | 573 | 136 | 20.8 | .439 | .342 | .857 | 3.6 | 1.6 | .7 | .4 | 10.1 |

==== Playoffs ====
| Year | Team | GP | GS | MPG | FG% | 3P% | FT% | RPG | APG | SPG | BPG | PPG |
|---|---|---|---|---|---|---|---|---|---|---|---|---|
| 2014 | Oklahoma City | **11** | 0 | **9.1** | .405 | .143 | **1.000** | **1.5** | **.6** | **.6** | **.1** | 3.6 |
| 2016 | Charlotte | 3 | 0 | 4.0 | **.556** | **1.000** | .000 | 1.3 | .3 | .0 | .0 | **3.7** |
| Career | | 14 | 0 | 8.0 | .431 | .200 | 1.000 | 1.4 | .6 | .5 | .1 | 3.6 |

=== College ===
| Year | Team | GP | GS | MPG | FG% | 3P% | FT% | RPG | APG | SPG | BPG | PPG |
|---|---|---|---|---|---|---|---|---|---|---|---|---|
| 2010–11 | Connecticut | **41** | **40** | 28.8 | **.487** | **.368** | .797 | 4.5 | 1.6 | .9 | **.6** | 11.1 |
| 2011–12 | Connecticut | 34 | 34 | **37.2** | .478 | .336 | **.810** | **4.9** | **1.7** | **1.2** | **.6** | **17.7** |
| Career | | 75 | 74 | 32.1 | .482 | .348 | .806 | 4.7 | 1.7 | 1.0 | .6 | 14.1 |

== Personal life ==
Lamb is the son of Rolando and Angela Lamb and is the third of four siblings. Rolando is a pastor and a former college basketball player who famously scored a game-winning buzzer-beater for Virginia Commonwealth against Northeastern in the 1984 NCAA tournament. He was also selected with the 53rd pick in the 1985 NBA draft, though Rolando never played in the NBA. Lamb's brother, Zach, played college basketball for Cal State Bakersfield. Lamb is currently in a relationship with Anjali Ranadive, the daughter of Sacramento Kings owner Vivek Ranadive.
