= Retrocalcaneal bursitis =

Medical condition

Retrocalcaneal bursitis is an inflammation of the bursa located between the calcaneus and the anterior surface of the Achilles tendon. It commonly occurs in association with rheumatoid arthritis, spondyloarthropathies, gout, and trauma.

The pain is usually on the back of the heel and swelling appears on lateral or medial side of the tendon.
