= Jared Terrell =

American basketball player (born 1995)

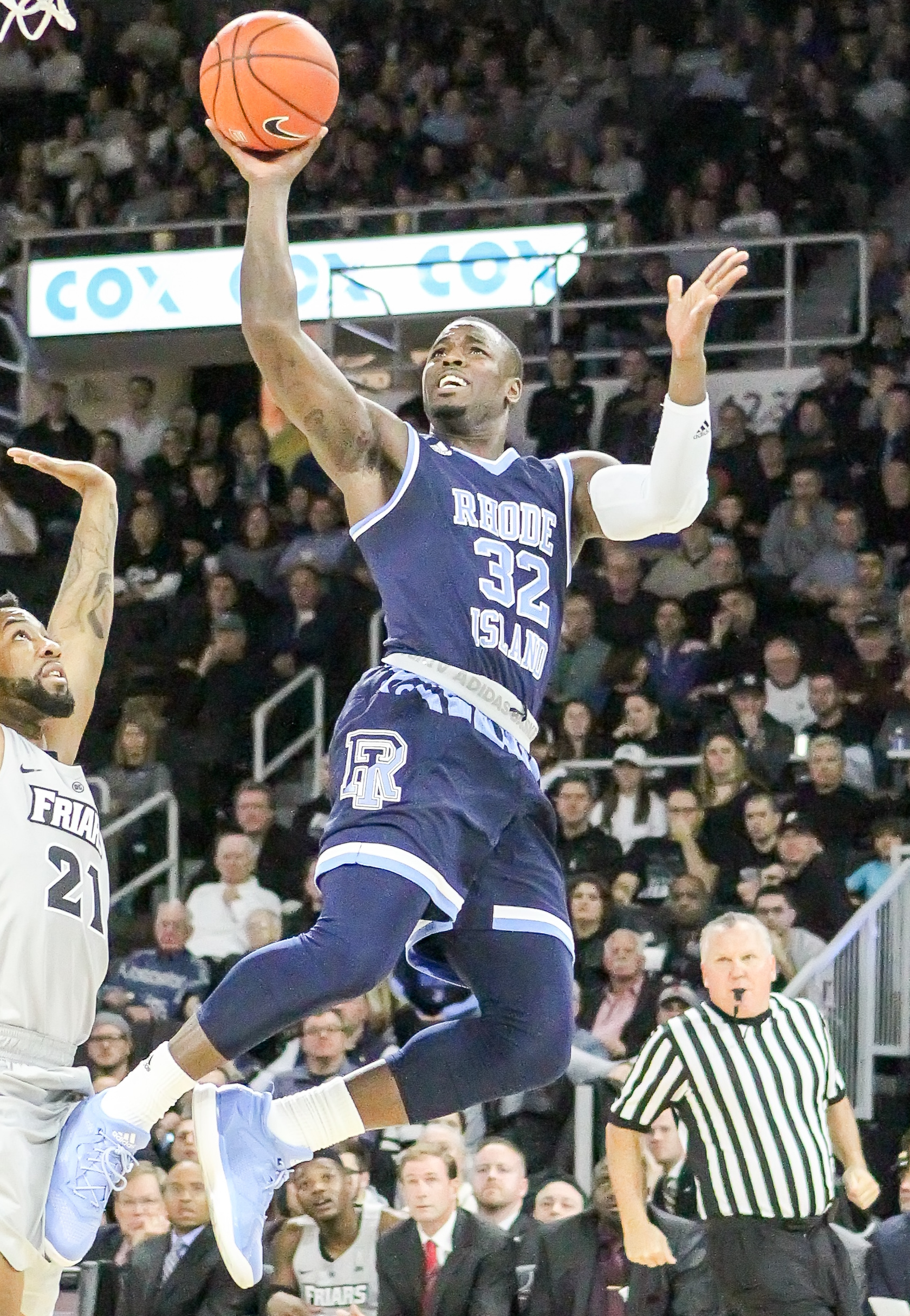
- Terrell with Rhode Island in December 2016

Personal information
- Born: February 10, 1995 (age 31) Weymouth, Massachusetts, U.s.
- Listed height: 6 ft 3 in (1.91 m)
- Listed weight: 227 lb (103 kg)

Career information
- High school: Weymouth (Weymouth, Massachusetts); New Hampton School (New Hampton, New Hampshire); Brewster Academy (Wolfeboro, New Hampshire)
- College: Rhode Island (2014–2018)
- NBA draft: 2018: undrafted
- Playing career: 2018–2023
- Position: Shooting guard

Career history
- 2018–2019: Minnesota Timberwolves
- 2018–2019: →Iowa Wolves
- 2019: Hapoel Eilat
- 2020–2022: Dnipro
- 2022: Türk Telekom
- 2022–2023: Hapoel Eilat

Career highlights
- Ukrainian League MVP (2020); First-team All-Atlantic 10 (2018)
- Stats at NBA.com
- Stats at Basketball Reference

Jared Marquis Terrell (born February 10, 1995) is an American professional basketball player who last played for Hapoel Eilat of the Israeli Basketball Premier League. He played college basketball for the Rhode Island Rams.

== High school career ==
Terrell began his high school career at Weymouth High School, where he averaged 11 points a game. He made big strides as a sophomore and posted 16 points per game and helped Weymouth to a Bay State Conference Carey Division title with an 18–4 record. The next season, Terrell transferred to the New Hampton School, where one of his teammates was future NBA player Noah Vonleh. His time at New Hampton was marred by injuries and he transferred again to Brewster Academy, where he was teammates with Devonte' Graham. During two years at Brewster, Terrell averaged 14.5 points, 5.0 rebounds and 3.0 assists. He guided the team to a New England prep title in 2013 and 2014 and was named the MVP of the tournament. Terrell led Brewster to their third National Prep Championship in 2014. Terrell formed a formidable backcourt at Brewster, which consisted of two other future NBA players in Devonte' Graham and Donovan Mitchell. Terrell was highly recruited out of high school and accepted a scholarship to Oklahoma State before changing his mind and picking Rhode Island.

== College career ==
Despite posting four consecutive losing seasons before Terrell arrived, the Rams finished 23–10 his freshman year and reached the NIT. He was named to the All-Atlantic 10 Rookie Team. As a sophomore, he averaged 13.6 points per game on a 17–15 team. Terrell's scoring went down somewhat as a junior to 12.6 points per game, but the Rams finished 25–10 and reached the NCAA tournament.

On November 27, 2017, Terrell had a career-high 32 points in a 75–74 win over Seton Hall and hit the game-winning layup with 5.2 seconds left. As a senior, he led Rhode Island in scoring with 16.8 points per game. He was named to the First Team All-Atlantic 10 as a senior. Terrell led the Rams to 26–8 record and an NCAA tournament appearance, where they beat Oklahoma behind 13 points from Terrell. Rhode Island bowed out in the second round to Duke with Terrell contributing 10 points.

== Professional career ==
Terrell went undrafted in the 2018 NBA draft but was signed by the Minnesota Timberwolves to a two-way contract with the Iowa Wolves of the G League shortly thereafter. Terrell made his NBA debut on November 4, 2018, against the Portland Trail Blazers, playing 21 minutes and scoring four points off 1-of-8 shooting in a 111–81 loss.

On September 14, 2019, Terrell signed a one-year deal with Hapoel Eilat of the Israeli Premier League. On October 28, 2019, Terrell recorded a season-high 25 points, while shooting 8-of-15 from the field, along with four rebounds in an 87–76 win over Maccabi Haifa. On December 20, 2019, he parted ways with Eilat after appearing in six games due to an injury.

On January 7, 2020, Terrell signed with Dnipro of the Ukrainian Basketball SuperLeague for the rest of the season. Terrell was named to the "USA/EU" team of the Ukrainian Basketball SuperLeague All-Star Game.

On January 7, 2022, Terrell signed with Türk Telekom of the Basketball Super League.

On August 15, 2022, he has signed with Hapoel Eilat of the Israeli Basketball Premier League.

== Personal ==
Terrell is a native of Weymouth, Massachusetts and has two brothers, Royce II and Jordan. Terrell had a son, Jared Jr. in September 2017.

== Career statistics ==
Legend
GP	Games played	GS	Games started	MPG	Minutes per game
FG%	Field goal percentage	3P%	3-point field goal percentage	FT%	Free throw percentage
RPG	Rebounds per game	APG	Assists per game	SPG	Steals per game
BPG	Blocks per game	PPG	Points per game	**Bold**	Career high

=== NBA ===
==== Regular season ====
Year	Team	GP	GS	MPG	FG%	3P%	FT%	RPG	APG	SPG	BPG	PPG
2018–19	Minnesota	14	0	7.9	.308	.235	.500	.4	.9	.2	.1	2.2
Career		14	0	7.9	.308	.235	.500	.4	.9	.2	.1	2.2

=== College ===
Year	Team	GP	GS	MPG	FG%	3P%	FT%	RPG	APG	SPG	BPG	PPG
2014–15	Rhode Island	33	31	27.1	.371	.319	.714	2.4	1.5	1.3	.1	9.2
2015–16	Rhode Island	32	32	**35.5**	.397	.347	.750	3.4	**2.6**	1.1	**.2**	13.6
2016–17	Rhode Island	**35**	**34**	30.7	.419	.346	.750	2.9	2.0	1.0	.1	12.6
2017–18	Rhode Island	34	**34**	33.2	**.427**	**.414**	**.821**	**3.5**	2.4	**1.5**	**.2**	**16.8**
Career		134	131	31.6	.406	.365	.763	3.0	2.1	1.2	.1	13.0

Source: RealGM
