= Ryan Saunders =

American basketball coach (born 1986)

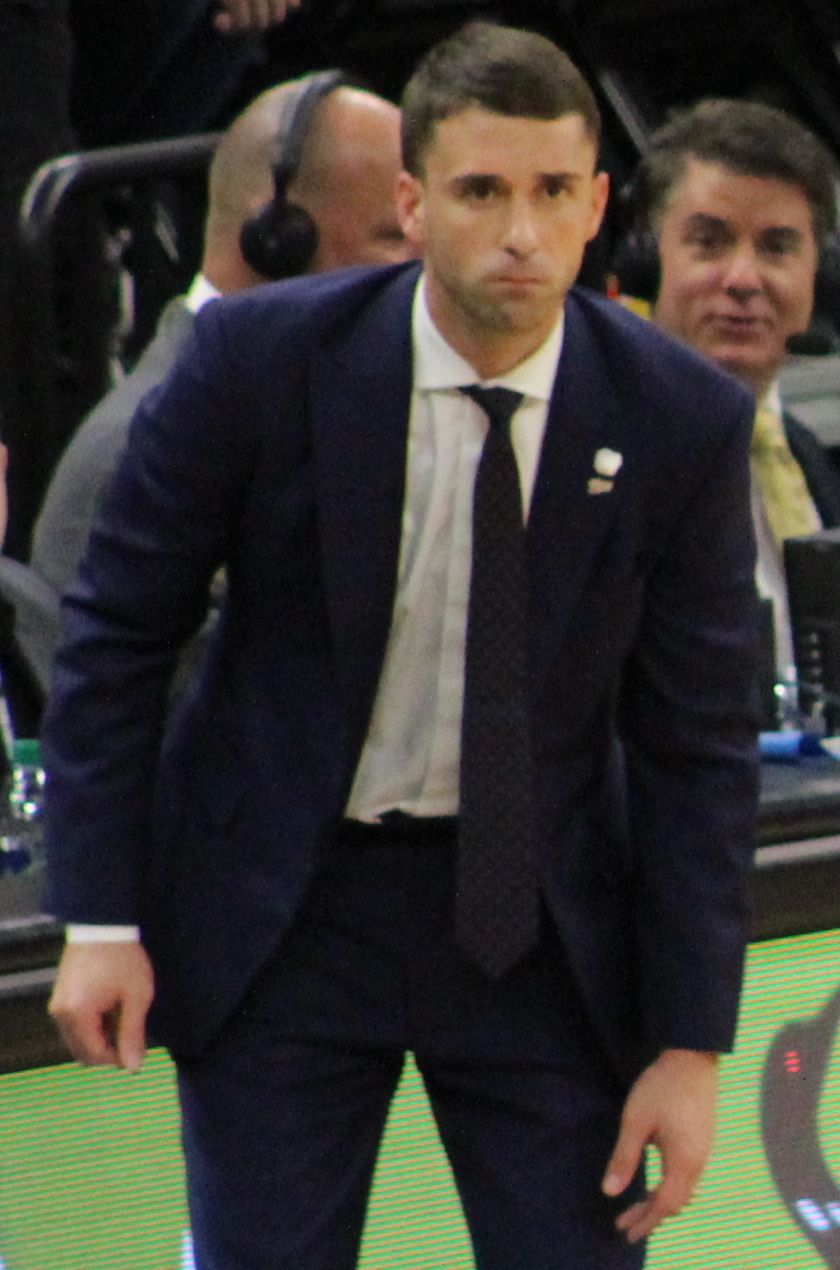
- Saunders in 2019

Memphis Grizzlies
- Title: Assistant coach
- League: NBA

Personal information
- Born: April 28, 1986 (age 40) Medina, Minnesota, U.S.
- Listed height: 6 ft 1 in (1.85 m)
- Listed weight: 180 lb (82 kg)

Career information
- High school: Wayzata (Plymouth, Minnesota)
- College: Minnesota (2004–2008)
- Position: Guard
- Coaching career: 2009–present

Career history

Coaching
- 2009–2014: Washington Wizards (assistant)
- 2014–2019: Minnesota Timberwolves (assistant)
- 2019–2021: Minnesota Timberwolves
- 2022–2025: Denver Nuggets (assistant)
- 2025–present: Memphis Grizzlies (lead assistant)

Career highlights
- As assistant coach: NBA champion (2023)

Ryan Philip Saunders (born April 28, 1986) is an American basketball coach who currently serves as the lead assistant for the Memphis Grizzlies of the National Basketball Association (NBA). He is known for his work in the NBA as a head coach for the Minnesota Timberwolves, as an assistant coach for the Denver Nuggets, and in player development with the Washington Wizards staff. He is the son of longtime NBA coach Flip Saunders.

== Early life ==
Born in Medina, Minnesota, Saunders graduated from Wayzata High School in Plymouth, Minnesota in 2004.

== College playing career ==
A walk-on, Saunders played basketball at the University of Minnesota from 2004 to 2008 as a guard. He played only 20 games in his first two seasons in a backup role. Saunders redshirted the 2006–07 season due to a wrist injury and did not play any games in the 2007–08 season. Saunders graduated from Minnesota in 2008 with a bachelor's degree in sport management.

== Coaching career ==
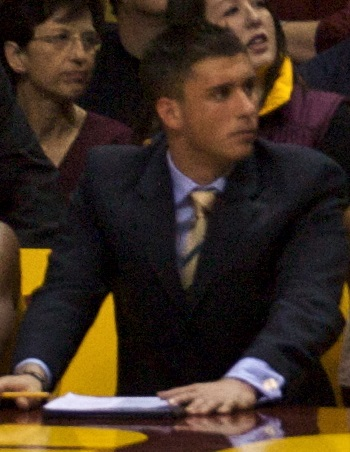
Saunders in 2009 as the University of Minnesota graduate manager

After he achieved his bachelor's degree and finished playing college basketball, Saunders was a graduate manager under Tubby Smith in the 2008–09 season while pursuing a master's degree in applied kinesiology.

In 2009, he began coaching in the NBA, becoming an assistant coach for the Washington Wizards. Then, starting in 2014, he was an assistant coach for the Minnesota Timberwolves. On January 6, 2019, Saunders was promoted to interim head coach of the Timberwolves after Tom Thibodeau was fired, also becoming the youngest head coach in the NBA for the 2018–19 season. On January 8, Saunders got his first win in his debut as head coach when the Timberwolves defeated the Oklahoma City Thunder, and became the youngest head coach to win in his debut since 1978. On May 20, the Timberwolves announced that Saunders signed to a multi-year deal to become the team's permanent head coach, removing his "interim" status. At age 33, Saunders became the youngest head coach in the league, despite having over 10 years of NBA experience under his belt. On February 21, 2021, Saunders was fired by the Timberwolves, after leading them to a 7–24 record.

On June 12, 2022, the Denver Nuggets hired Saunders as an assistant coach under Michael Malone. Saunders won an NBA championship in 2023 when the Nuggets defeated the Miami Heat in the NBA Finals. On May 30, 2025, it was announced that Saunders and the Nuggets would be parting ways.

On July 14, 2025, the Memphis Grizzlies hired Saunders as their lead assistant under head coach Tuomas Iisalo.

== Head coaching record ==
Legend
Regular season	G	Games coached	W	Games won	L	Games lost	W–L %	Win–loss %
Playoffs	PG	Playoff games	PW	Playoff wins	PL	Playoff losses	PW–L %	Playoff win–loss %

Team	Year	G	W	L	W–L%	Finish	PG	PW	PL	PW–L%	Result
Minnesota	2018–19	42	17	25	.405	5th in Northwest	—	—	—	—	Missed playoffs
Minnesota	2019–20	64	19	45	.297	5th in Northwest	—	—	—	—	Missed playoffs
Minnesota	2020–21	31	7	24	.226	(fired)	—	—	—	—	—
Career		137	43	94	.314		—	—	—	—	

== Academic career ==
Ryan Saunders joined University of Northwestern-St. Paul as an adjunct instructor for the Spring 2022 semester where he taught Sports Leadership in the College of Behavioral & Natural Sciences.

== Personal life ==
When Saunders was born, his father Flip Saunders was an assistant coach at the University of Minnesota. Ryan Saunders grew up in Wisconsin and South Dakota, as Flip later worked as head coach for CBA teams in those states (specifically, the Rapid City Thrillers (1988–1989), La Crosse Catbirds (1989–1994), and Sioux Falls Skyforce (1994–1995)). In 1995, the Saunders family returned to the Minneapolis–Saint Paul area when Flip Saunders became head coach of the Minnesota Timberwolves, a position he would maintain for the rest of Ryan's childhood.

Saunders married his wife Hayley in 2017, and they had a son in 2019. Saunders is a Christian.

Saunders has taken part in multiple basketball camps for the youth and charitable organizations in Minnesota.
