= C. J. Williams (basketball) =

American basketball player (born 1990)

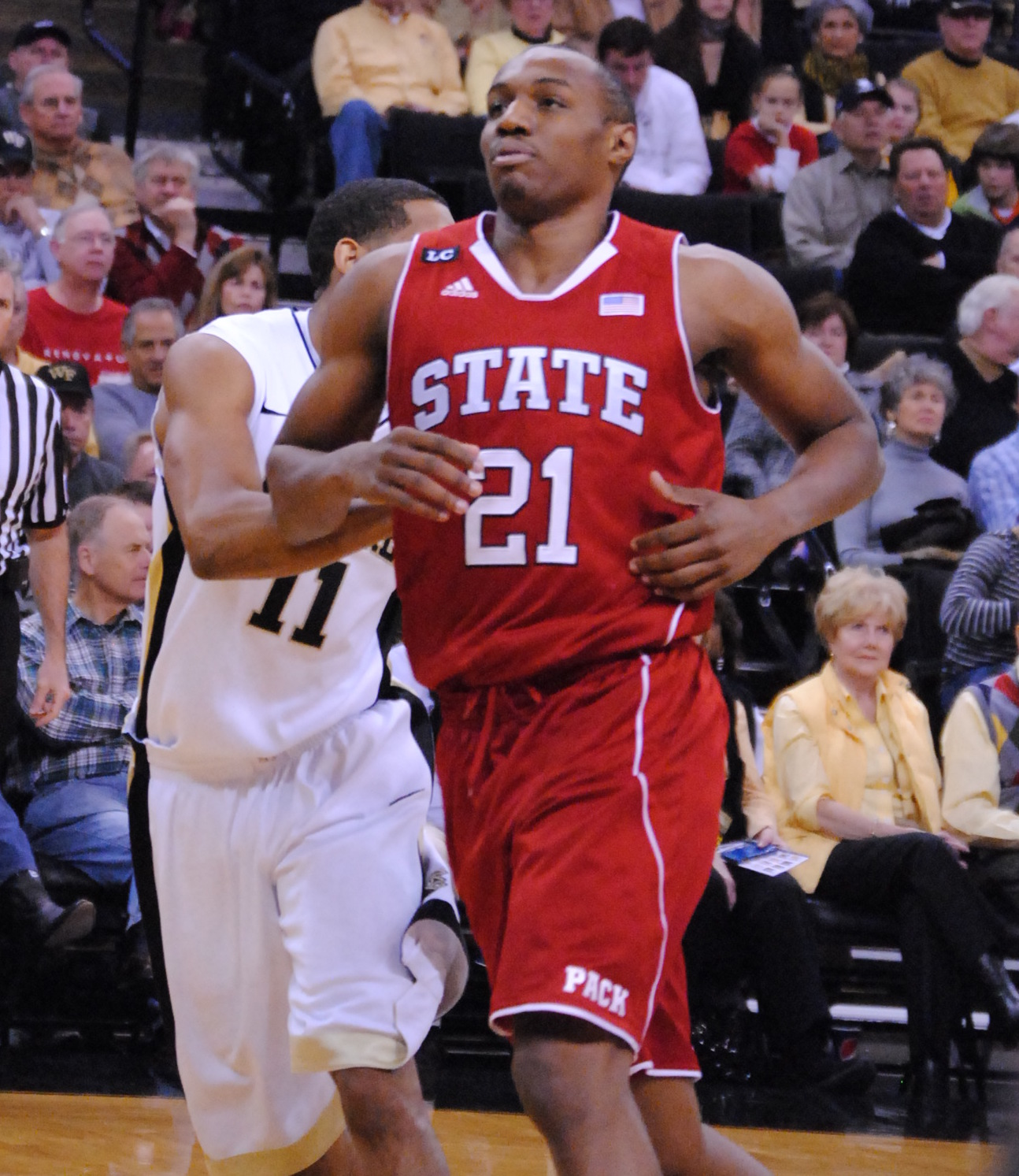

Free agent
- Position: Shooting guard / small forward

Personal information
- Born: February 6, 1990 (age 36) Fayetteville, North Carolina, U.S.
- Listed height: 6 ft 5 in (1.96 m)
- Listed weight: 234 lb (106 kg)

Career information
- High school: Jack Britt (Fayetteville, North Carolina)
- College: NC State (2008–2012)
- NBA draft: 2012: undrafted
- Playing career: 2012–present

Career history
- 2012–2013: ETHA Engomis
- 2013–2014: Los Angeles D-Fenders
- 2014–2015: Giorgio Tesi Group Pistoia
- 2015–2016: JDA Dijon
- 2016–2017: Texas Legends
- 2017–2018: Los Angeles Clippers
- 2017–2018: →Agua Caliente Clippers
- 2018–2019: Minnesota Timberwolves
- 2018–2019: →Iowa Wolves
- 2019–2020: Long Island Nets
- 2021: Élan Béarnais
- 2021–2022: Semt77 Yalovaspor
- 2022–2023: Ironi Ness Ziona
- 2023: Élan Béarnais
- 2023–2024: CSM Corona Brașov
- 2024–2025: Start Lublin

Career highlights
- NBA G League Sportsmanship Award (2018); Cypriot Cup champion (2013)
- Stats at NBA.com
- Stats at Basketball Reference
Medals
Men's basketball
Representing United States
FIBA AmeriCup
Gold medal – first place	2017 Argentina

Wendell Kerry Williams Jr. (born February 6, 1990) is an American professional basketball player who last played for Start Lublin of the Polish Basketball League (PLK). He played college basketball for North Carolina State.

== High school career ==
Williams attended Jack Britt High School under Ike Walker. As a senior, he averaged 15.7 points, 7.0 rebounds and 3.5 assists, leading his team to a 27–5 record and the state 4-A semifinals. For that, he was named the Cape Fear Region Player of the Year by the Fayetteville Observer and was a second-team all-state selection and was a two-time Mid Southeastern Conference Player of the Year. When he graduated, he was ranked as the No. 25 small forward by Rivals.com.

== College career ==
Williams played four years at North Carolina State. In 37 games as a senior, he averaged 10.6 points, 3.8 rebounds, 1.8 assists and 1.1 steals in 31.1 minutes and helped the Wolfpack reach the NCAA Tournament's Sweet 16.

== Professional career ==
=== ETHA Engomis (2012–2013) ===
After going undrafted in the 2012 NBA draft, Williams signed with ETHA Engomis of the Cypriot League on July 24, 2012. In 29 games, he averaged 13.5 points, 3.5 rebounds, 1.9 assists and 1.5 steals.

=== Los Angeles D-Fenders (2013–2014) ===
On November 1, 2013, Williams signed with the Los Angeles D-Fenders of the NBA Development League. In 49 games, he averaged 14.4 points, 4.6 rebounds, 2 assists and 1.2 steals.

=== Pistoia Basket 2000 (2014–2015) ===
After joining the Milwaukee Bucks for the 2014 NBA Summer League, Williams signed with Giorgio Tesi Group Pistoia of the Italian Serie A on August 11, 2014. In 30 games, he averaged 14.4 points, 4.2 rebounds, 2.1 assists, 0.9 steals and 0.7 blocks.

=== JDA Dijon Basket (2015–2016) ===
After joining the Minnesota Timberwolves for the 2015 NBA Summer League, Williams signed with JDA Dijon Basket of the French League on July 22, 2015. In 34 games, he averaged 11.9 points, 2.7 rebounds, 1.5 assists and 1 steal.

=== Texas Legends (2016–2017) ===
In July 2016, Williams joined the San Antonio Spurs for the 2016 NBA Summer League. On September 19, he signed with the Dallas Mavericks, but was waived on October 22 after appearing in five preseason games. On October 30, 2016, he was acquired by the Texas Legends of the NBA Development League as an affiliate player of the Mavericks.

=== Los Angeles Clippers (2017–2018) ===
On September 27, 2017, Williams signed with the Los Angeles Clippers. His training camp deal would later be upgraded into a two-way contract on October 14, 2017, meaning he can officially split playing time between the Los Angeles Clippers and their G League affiliate, the Agua Caliente Clippers. On January 8, 2018, Williams scored 15 points to help the LA Clippers defeat the Atlanta Hawks 108–107. Williams made the game winning three-point shot with 9.1 seconds remaining. On April 9, 2018, Williams was reported to have re-signed with the Los Angeles Clippers to a multi-year deal. On April 11, he was named the recipient of the 2018 NBA G League's Jason Collier Sportsmanship Award. On July 27, 2018, the Clippers waived Williams.

=== Minnesota Timberwolves (2018–2019) ===
On July 31, 2018, the Minnesota Timberwolves signed Williams to a two-way contract with the Timberwolves and the Iowa Wolves of the NBA G League.

=== Long Island Nets (2019–2020) ===
On September 25, 2019, Williams signed a non-guaranteed deal with the Brooklyn Nets, and was waived on October 18. He then landed with the Long Island Nets.

=== Élan Béarnais (2021) ===
On February 18, 2021, he signed with Élan Béarnais of the French LNB Pro A.

=== Yalovaspor (2021–2022) ===
On August 10, 2021, he signed with Semt77 Yalovaspor of the Turkish Basketball Super League.

=== Ironi Ness Ziona (2022–2023) ===
On July 17, 2022, he signed with Ironi Ness Ziona of the Israeli Basketball Super League.

=== Start Lublin (2024–2025) ===
On August 14, 2024, he signed with Start Lublin of the Polish Basketball League (PLK).

== National team career ==
Williams played with the senior United States national team at the 2017 FIBA AmeriCup, where he won a gold medal.

== Personal life ==
Williams' father played baseball in college at Florida A&M. Williams majored in Business Administration - Human Resources.

== NBA career statistics ==
Legend
GP	Games played	GS	Games started	MPG	Minutes per game
FG%	Field goal percentage	3P%	3-point field goal percentage	FT%	Free throw percentage
RPG	Rebounds per game	APG	Assists per game	SPG	Steals per game
BPG	Blocks per game	PPG	Points per game	**Bold**	Career high

=== Regular season ===
Year	Team	GP	GS	MPG	FG%	3P%	FT%	RPG	APG	SPG	BPG	PPG
2017–18	L.A. Clippers	**38**	**17**	**18.6**	.442	.282	**.813**	**1.5**	**1.1**	**.8**	**.3**	**5.5**
2018–19	Minnesota	15	0	8.5	**.486**	**.313**	.000	.5	.8	.4	.0	2.6
Career		53	17	15.8	.448	.287	.765	1.2	1.0	.7	.2	4.7
