= 2018–19 Minnesota Timberwolves season =

NBA professional basketball team season

- Head coach: Tom Thibodeau (fired); Ryan Saunders (interim)
- General manager: Scott Layden
- Owners: Glen Taylor
- Arena: Target Center

Results
- Record: 36–46 (.439)
- Place: Division: 5th (Northwest); Conference: 11th (Western)
- Playoff finish: Did not qualify
- Stats at Basketball Reference

Local media
- Television: Fox Sports North
- Radio: WCCO

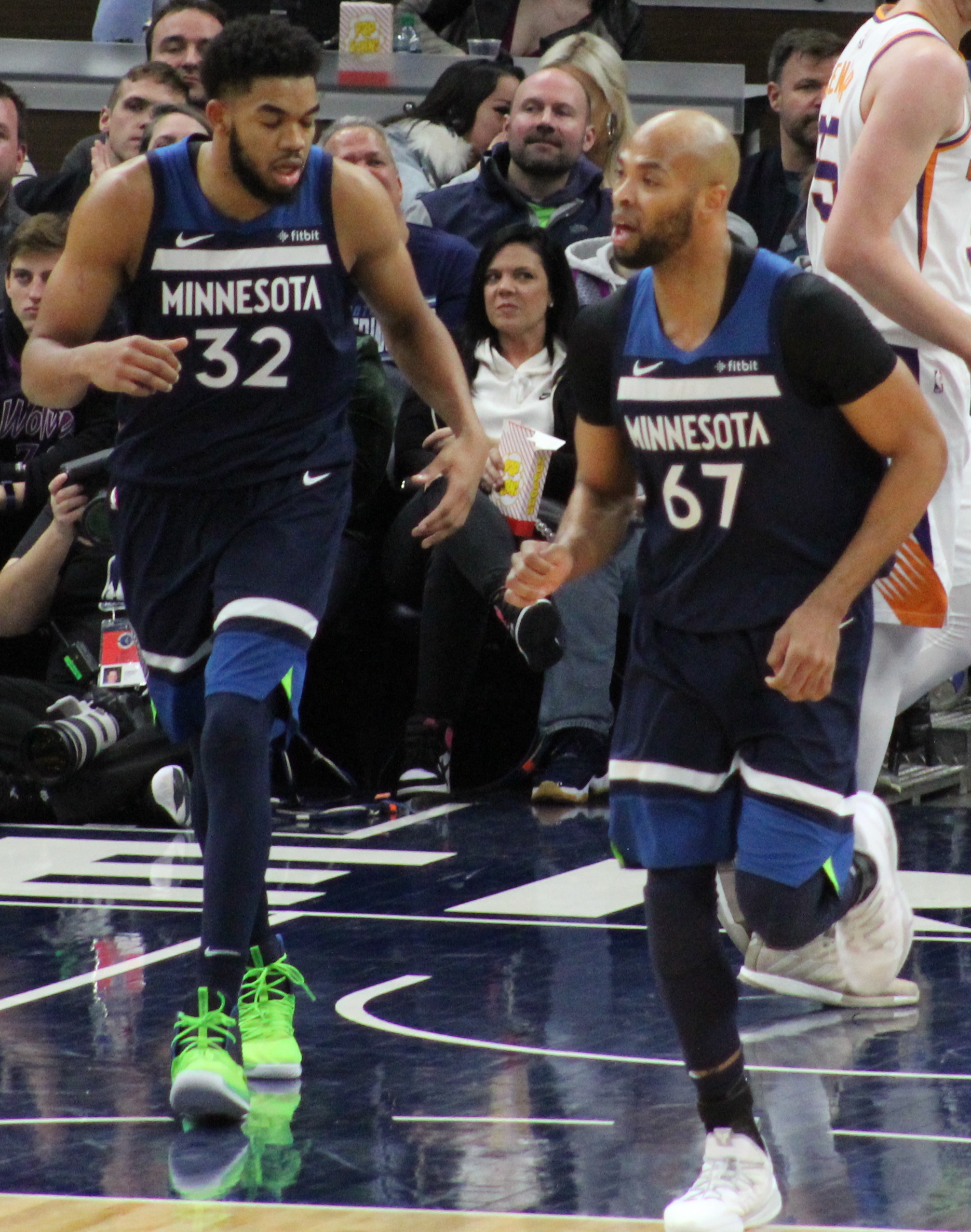
Karl Anthony Towns and Taj Gibson on the court in January 2019.

The 2018–19 Minnesota Timberwolves season was the 30th season of the franchise in the National Basketball Association (NBA).

Before the start of training camp, disgruntled All-Star Jimmy Butler requested a trade, indicating that he would not re-sign with the Timberwolves during the 2019 off-season. After multiple disputes and games where he played for Minnesota, Butler's wish was finally granted, sending him to the Philadelphia 76ers on November 12, 2018. On March 30, 2019, on his return against his former team Butler was booed during the players' introductions.

On January 6, 2019, the Timberwolves fired head coach Tom Thibodeau and named Ryan Saunders as interim head coach. With a loss against the Hornets on March 21, the Timberwolves were eliminated from playoff contention.

== Draft ==
Round	Pick	Player	Position	Nationality(-ies)	College / Club
1	20	Josh Okogie	SG	Nigeria; United States	Georgia Tech
2	48	Keita Bates-Diop	SF	United States	Ohio State

== Roster ==
2018–19 Minnesota Timberwolves roster
Players

Pos.	No.	Player	Height	Weight	DOB	From
F	31	Keita Bates-Diop	6 ft 9 in (2.06 m)	229 lb (104 kg)	1996–01–23	Ohio State
G	8	Jerryd Bayless	6 ft 3 in (1.91 m)	200 lb (91 kg)	1988–08–20	Arizona
G	55	Mitch Creek	6 ft 5 in (1.96 m)	215 lb (98 kg)	1992–08–27	Australia
F	33	Robert Covington	6 ft 9 in (2.06 m)	237 lb (108 kg)	1990–12–14	Tennessee State
F	9	Luol Deng	6 ft 9 in (2.06 m)	220 lb (100 kg)	1985–04–16	Duke
C	5	Gorgui Dieng	6 ft 11 in (2.11 m)	252 lb (114 kg)	1990–01–18	Louisville
F	67	Taj Gibson	6 ft 9 in (2.06 m)	232 lb (105 kg)	1985–06–24	USC
G	1	Tyus Jones	6 ft 2 in (1.88 m)	196 lb (89 kg)	1996–05–10	Duke
G	20	Josh Okogie	6 ft 4 in (1.93 m)	212 lb (96 kg)	1998–09–01	Georgia Tech
F	13	Cameron Reynolds	6 ft 8 in (2.03 m)	225 lb (102 kg)	1995–02–07	Tulane
G	25	Derrick Rose	6 ft 3 in (1.91 m)	200 lb (91 kg)	1988–10–04	Memphis
F	36	Dario Šarić	6 ft 11 in (2.11 m)	225 lb (102 kg)	1994–04–08	Croatia
G	0	Jeff Teague	6 ft 2 in (1.88 m)	195 lb (88 kg)	1988–06–10	Wake Forest
G	3	Jared Terrell (TW)	6 ft 3 in (1.91 m)	227 lb (103 kg)	1995–02–10	Rhode Island
F	43	Anthony Tolliver	6 ft 8 in (2.03 m)	250 lb (113 kg)	1985–06–01	Creighton
C	32	Karl-Anthony Towns	7 ft 0 in (2.13 m)	248 lb (112 kg)	1995–11–15	Kentucky
G/F	22	Andrew Wiggins	6 ft 8 in (2.03 m)	194 lb (88 kg)	1995–02–23	Kansas
G	12	C. J. Williams (TW)	6 ft 5 in (1.96 m)	226 lb (103 kg)	1990–02–06	NC State

Coaches
Head coach
- Ryan Saunders
Assistant(s)
- Malik Allen
- Larry Greer
- Ed Pinckney
- Jerry Sichting
- John Lucas III (player development)

Legend
- (DP) Unsigned draft pick
- (FA) Free agent
- (S) Suspended
- (GL) On assignment to G League affiliate
- (TW) Two-way affiliate player
- Injured

Roster
Updated: 2019–02–27

== Standings ==
=== Division ===
Northwest Division	W	L	PCT	GB	Home	Road	Div	GP
y – Denver Nuggets	54	28	.659	–	34‍–‍7	20‍–‍21	12–4	82
x – Portland Trail Blazers	53	29	.646	1.0	32‍–‍9	21‍–‍20	6–10	82
x – Utah Jazz	50	32	.610	4.0	29‍–‍12	21‍–‍20	8–8	82
x – Oklahoma City Thunder	49	33	.598	5.0	27‍–‍14	22‍–‍19	9–7	82
Minnesota Timberwolves	36	46	.439	18.0	25‍–‍16	11‍–‍30	5–11	82

=== Conference ===
Western Conference
#	Team	W	L	PCT	GB	GP
1	c – Golden State Warriors *	57	25	.695	–	82
2	y – Denver Nuggets *	54	28	.659	3.0	82
3	x – Portland Trail Blazers	53	29	.646	4.0	82
4	y – Houston Rockets *	53	29	.646	4.0	82
5	x – Utah Jazz	50	32	.610	7.0	82
6	x – Oklahoma City Thunder	49	33	.598	8.0	82
7	x – San Antonio Spurs	48	34	.585	9.0	82
8	x – Los Angeles Clippers	48	34	.585	9.0	82
9	Sacramento Kings	39	43	.476	18.0	82
10	Los Angeles Lakers	37	45	.451	20.0	82
11	Minnesota Timberwolves	36	46	.439	21.0	82
12	Memphis Grizzlies	33	49	.402	24.0	82
13	New Orleans Pelicans	33	49	.402	24.0	82
14	Dallas Mavericks	33	49	.402	24.0	82
15	Phoenix Suns	19	63	.232	38.0	82

== Game log ==
=== Preseason ===
2018 preseason game log
Total: 1–4 (Home: 0–2; Road: 1–2)
Preseason: 1–4 (home: 0–2; road: 1–2)

Game	Date	Team	Score	High points	High rebounds	High assists	Location Attendance	Record
1	September 29	@ Golden State	W 114–110	Teague (17)	Dieng (8)	Jones (4)	Oracle Arena; 19,596	1–0
2	October 3	@ LA Clippers	L 101–128	Towns (18)	Dieng, Towns (7)	Tolliver (3)	Staples Center; 10,099	1–1
3	October 5	Oklahoma City	L 101–113	Towns (23)	Towns, Wiggins (7)	Teague, Jones (4)	Target Center; 9,801	1–2
4	October 7	Milwaukee	L 107–125	Towns (33)	Towns (12)	Teague (7)	Hilton Coliseum; 11,603	1–3
5	October 12	@ Milwaukee	L 121–143	Gibson (21)	Gibson (7)	Jones (5)	Fiserv Forum; 14,724	1–4

2018–19 season schedule

=== Regular season ===
2018–19 game log
Total: 36–46 (Home: 25–16; Road: 11–30)
October: 4–4 (home: 4–1; road: 0–3)

Game	Date	Team	Score	High points	High rebounds	High assists	Location Attendance	Record
1	October 17	@ San Antonio	L 108–112	Jeff Teague (27)	Taj Gibson (11)	Jeff Teague (4)	AT&T Center; 18,354	0–1
2	October 19	Cleveland	W 131–123	Jimmy Butler (33)	Karl-Anthony Towns (9)	Jeff Teague (7)	Target Center; 18,978	1–1
3	October 20	@ Dallas	L 136–140	Karl-Anthony Towns (31)	Gorgui Dieng (6)	Jeff Teague (9)	American Airlines Center; 20,205	1–2
4	October 22	Indiana	W 101–91	Jimmy Butler (20)	Karl-Anthony Towns (14)	Jeff Teague (10)	Target Center; 10,371	2–2
5	October 24	@ Toronto	L 105–112	Jimmy Butler (23)	Josh Okogie (11)	Jeff Teague (9)	Scotiabank Arena; 19,800	2–3
6	October 26	Milwaukee	L 95–125	Karl-Anthony Towns (16)	Towns, Gibson (7)	Jeff Teague, Jones (4)	Target Center; 16,334	2–4
7	October 29	LA Lakers	W 124–120	Jimmy Butler (32)	Karl-Anthony Towns (16)	Derrick Rose (7)	Target Center; 18,978	3–4
8	October 31	Utah	W 128–125	Derrick Rose (50)	Karl-Anthony Towns (16)	Derrick Rose (6)	Target Center; 10,079	4–4

November : 7–7 (home: 5–2; road: 2–5)

Game	Date	Team	Score	High points	High rebounds	High assists	Location Attendance	Record
9	November 2	@ Golden State	L 99–116	Andrew Wiggins (22)	Karl-Anthony Towns (11)	Tyus Jones (9)	Oracle Arena; 19,596	4–5
10	November 4	@ Portland	L 81–111	Karl-Anthony Towns (23)	Taj Gibson (8)	Tyus Jones (4)	Moda Center; 19,522	4–6
11	November 5	@ LA Clippers	L 109–120	Derrick Rose (21)	Karl-Anthony Towns (12)	Jimmy Butler (5)	Staples Center; 16,564	4–7
12	November 7	@ LA Lakers	L 110–114	Derrick Rose (31)	Taj Gibson (11)	Rose, Butler, Wiggins (5)	Staples Center; 18,997	4–8
13	November 9	@ Sacramento	L 110–121	Karl-Anthony Towns (39)	Karl-Anthony Towns (19)	Jimmy Butler (8)	Golden 1 Center; 17,583	4–9
14	November 12	Brooklyn	W 120–113	Karl-Anthony Towns (25)	Karl-Anthony Towns (21)	Jeff Teague (11)	Target Center; 10,186	5–9
15	November 14	New Orleans	W 107–100	Karl-Anthony Towns (25)	Karl-Anthony Towns (16)	Jeff Teague (14)	Target Center; 11,636	6–9
16	November 16	Portland	W 112–96	Andrew Wiggins (23)	Karl-Anthony Towns (9)	Jeff Teague (7)	Target Center; 18,978	7–9
17	November 18	Memphis	L 87–100	Derrick Rose (18)	Karl-Anthony Towns (20)	Teague, Wiggins, Jones (4)	Target Center; 13,179	7–10
18	November 21	Denver	L 101–103	Karl-Anthony Towns (22)	Towns, Dieng, Šarić (7)	Jeff Teague (8)	Target Center; 15,086	7–11
19	November 23	@ Brooklyn	W 112–102	Karl-Anthony Towns (22)	Taj Gibson (11)	Jeff Teague (9)	Barclays Center; 12,814	8–11
20	November 24	Chicago	W 111–96	Karl-Anthony Towns (35)	Karl-Anthony Towns (22)	Karl-Anthony Towns (6)	Target Center; 17,119	9–11
21	November 26	@ Cleveland	W 102–95	Robert Covington (24)	Karl-Anthony Towns (10)	Jeff Teague (6)	Quicken Loans Arena; 19,432	10–11
22	November 28	San Antonio	W 128–89	Robert Covington (21)	Karl-Anthony Towns (11)	Jeff Teague (9)	Target Center; 11,023	11–11

December : 6–9 (home: 3–3; road: 3–6)

Game	Date	Team	Score	High points	High rebounds	High assists	Location Attendance	Record
23	December 1	Boston	L 109–118	Derrick Rose (26)	Robert Covington (10)	Jeff Teague (6)	Target Center; 17,663	11–12
24	December 3	Houston	W 103–91	Karl-Anthony Towns (24)	Towns, Gibson (11)	Jeff Teague (7)	Target Center; 13,844	12–12
25	December 5	Charlotte	W 121–104	Karl-Anthony Towns (35)	Karl-Anthony Towns (12)	Jeff Teague (18)	Target Center; 11,248	13–12
26	December 8	@ Portland	L 105–113	Andrew Wiggins (20)	Karl-Anthony Towns (10)	Derrick Rose (9)	Moda Center; 19,359	13–13
27	December 10	@ Golden State	L 108–116	Karl-Anthony Towns (31)	Karl-Anthony Towns (11)	Jeff Teague (11)	Oracle Arena; 19,596	13–14
28	December 12	@ Sacramento	L 130–141	Andrew Wiggins (25)	Karl-Anthony Towns (11)	Jeff Teague (13)	Golden 1 Center; 15,770	13–15
29	December 15	@ Phoenix	L 99–107	Karl-Anthony Towns (28)	Karl-Anthony Towns (12)	Jeff Teague (11)	Talking Stick Resort Arena; 14,244	13–16
30	December 17	Sacramento	W 132–105	Andrew Wiggins (17)	Karl-Anthony Towns (14)	Derrick Rose (11)	Target Center; 12,417	14–16
31	December 19	Detroit	L 123–129 (OT)	Derrick Rose (33)	Towns, Gibson (8)	Derrick Rose (7)	Target Center; 15,883	14–17
32	December 21	@ San Antonio	L 98–124	Andrew Wiggins (15)	Covington, Gibson (7)	Towns, Šarić (4)	AT&T Center; 17,708	14–18
33	December 23	@ Oklahoma City	W 114–112	Andrew Wiggins (30)	Dario Šarić (8)	Karl-Anthony Towns (6)	Chesapeake Energy Arena; 18,203	15–18
34	December 26	@ Chicago	W 112–94	Derrick Rose (24)	Karl-Anthony Towns (20)	Derrick Rose (8)	United Center; 21,852	16–18
35	December 28	Atlanta	L 120–123 (OT)	Robert Covington (28)	Karl-Anthony Towns (19)	Derrick Rose (9)	Target Center; 18,978	16–19
36	December 30	@ Miami	W 113–104	Karl-Anthony Towns (34)	Karl-Anthony Towns (18)	Karl-Anthony Towns (7)	AmericanAirlines Arena; 19,600	17–19
37	December 31	@ New Orleans	L 114–123	Karl-Anthony Towns (28)	Karl-Anthony Towns (17)	Tyus Jones (13)	Smoothie King Center; 14,904	17–20

January : 8–6 (home: 5–3; road: 3–3)

Game	Date	Team	Score	High points	High rebounds	High assists	Location Attendance	Record
38	January 2	@ Boston	L 102–115	Andrew Wiggins (31)	Karl-Anthony Towns (12)	Tyus Jones (9)	TD Garden; 18,624	17–21
39	January 4	Orlando	W 120–103	Karl-Anthony Towns (29)	Karl-Anthony Towns (15)	Jeff Teague (10)	Target Center; 14,355	18–21
40	January 6	LA Lakers	W 108–86	Towns, Wiggins (28)	Karl-Anthony Towns (18)	Jeff Teague (11)	Target Center; 18,978	19–21
41	January 8	@ Oklahoma City	W 119–117	Andrew Wiggins (40)	Andrew Wiggins (10)	Jeff Teague (5)	Chesapeake Energy Arena; 18,203	20–21
42	January 11	Dallas	L 115–119	Karl-Anthony Towns (30)	Taj Gibson (15)	Tyus Jones (9)	Target Center; 18,978	20–22
43	January 12	New Orleans	W 110–106	Karl-Anthony Towns (27)	Karl-Anthony Towns (27)	Jeff Teague (10)	Target Center; 16,384	21–22
44	January 15	@ Philadelphia	L 107–149	Derrick Rose (15)	Gorgui Dieng (9)	Derrick Rose (4)	Wells Fargo Center; 20,487	21–23
45	January 18	San Antonio	L 113–116	Karl-Anthony Towns (23)	Taj Gibson (11)	Teague, Rose (6)	Target Center; 17,222	21–24
46	January 20	Phoenix	W 116–114	Karl-Anthony Towns (30)	Karl-Anthony Towns (12)	Jeff Teague (8)	Target Center; 14,607	22–24
47	January 22	@ Phoenix	W 118–91	Karl-Anthony Towns (25)	Karl-Anthony Towns (18)	Karl-Anthony Towns (7)	Talking Stick Resort Arena; 14,460	23–24
48	January 24	@ LA Lakers	W 120–105	Karl-Anthony Towns (27)	Karl-Anthony Towns (12)	Jerryd Bayless (8)	Staples Center; 18,997	24–24
49	January 25	@ Utah	L 102–106	Karl-Anthony Towns (33)	Andrew Wiggins (11)	Jerryd Bayless (5)	Vivint Smart Home Arena; 18,306	24–25
50	January 27	Utah	L 111–125	Andrew Wiggins (35)	Dario Šarić (11)	Karl-Anthony Towns (7)	Target Center; 14,542	24–26
51	January 30	Memphis	W 99–97 (OT)	Jerryd Bayless (19)	Karl-Anthony Towns (10)	Jerryd Bayless (12)	Target Center; 13,615	25–26

February : 4–7 (home: 3–1; road: 1–6)

Game	Date	Team	Score	High points	High rebounds	High assists	Location Attendance	Record
52	February 2	Denver	L 106–107	Karl-Anthony Towns (31)	Karl-Anthony Towns (12)	Jerryd Bayless (10)	Target Center; 17,208	25–27
53	February 5	@ Memphis	L 106–108	Karl-Anthony Towns (26)	Karl-Anthony Towns (18)	Jerryd Bayless (8)	FedExForum; 13,454	25–28
54	February 7	@ Orlando	L 112–122	Karl-Anthony Towns (27)	Karl-Anthony Towns (11)	Isaiah Canaan (6)	Amway Center; 17,184	25–29
55	February 8	@ New Orleans	L 117–122	Karl-Anthony Towns (32)	Andrew Wiggins (10)	Andrew Wiggins (7)	Smoothie King Center; 16,980	25–30
56	February 11	LA Clippers	W 130–120	Karl-Anthony Towns (24)	Karl-Anthony Towns (10)	Jeff Teague (10)	Target Center; 13,782	26–30
57	February 13	Houston	W 121–111	Jeff Teague (27)	Karl-Anthony Towns (9)	Jeff Teague (12)	Target Center; 15,131	27–30
58	February 22	@ N. Y. Knicks	W 115–104	Derrick Rose (20)	Taj Gibson (11)	Jeff Teague (11)	Madison Square Garden; 19,096	28–30
59	February 23	@ Milwaukee	L 128–140	Derrick Rose (23)	Andrew Wiggins (9)	Tyus Jones (9)	Fiserv Forum; 17,972	28–31
60	February 25	Sacramento	W 112–105	Karl-Anthony Towns (34)	Karl-Anthony Towns (21)	Tyus Jones (8)	Target Center; 13,691	29–31
61	February 27	@ Atlanta	L 123–131 (OT)	Karl-Anthony Towns (37)	Karl-Anthony Towns (18)	Tyus Jones (11)	State Farm Arena; 14,101	29–32
62	February 28	@ Indiana	L 115–122	Karl-Anthony Towns (47)	Karl-Anthony Towns (14)	Jeff Teague (5)	Bankers Life Fieldhouse; 17,003	29–33

March : 5–9 (home: 4–3; road: 1–6)

Game	Date	Team	Score	High points	High rebounds	High assists	Location Attendance	Record
63	March 3	@ Washington	L 121–135	Karl-Anthony Towns (28)	Karl-Anthony Towns (10)	Jeff Teague (8)	Capital One Arena; 17,869	29–34
64	March 5	Oklahoma City	W 131–120	Karl-Anthony Towns (41)	Karl-Anthony Towns (14)	Jeff Teague (12)	Target Center; 15,728	30–34
65	March 6	@ Detroit	L 114–131	Karl-Anthony Towns (24)	Dario Šarić (7)	Jeff Teague (8)	Little Caesars Arena; 15,240	30–35
66	March 9	Washington	W 135–130 (OT)	Karl-Anthony Towns (40)	Karl-Anthony Towns (16)	Jeff Teague (8)	Target Center; 14,381	31–35
67	March 10	N. Y. Knicks	W 103–92	Taj Gibson (25)	Taj Gibson (8)	Jeff Teague (10)	Target Center; 13,806	32–35
68	March 12	@ Denver	L 107–133	Karl-Anthony Towns (34)	Karl-Anthony Towns (10)	Tolliver, Bates-Diop, Williams (4)	Pepsi Center; 16,874	32–36
69	March 14	@ Utah	L 100–120	Karl-Anthony Towns (26)	Karl-Anthony Towns (12)	Tyus Jones (9)	Vivint Smart Home Arena; 18,306	32–37
70	March 17	@ Houston	L 102–117	Karl-Anthony Towns (22)	Karl-Anthony Towns (10)	Karl-Anthony Towns (6)	Toyota Center; 18,055	32–38
71	March 19	Golden State	L 107–117	Karl-Anthony Towns (24)	Karl-Anthony Towns (22)	Tyus Jones (7)	Target Center; 17,964	32–39
72	March 21	@ Charlotte	L 106–113	Karl-Anthony Towns (21)	Karl-Anthony Towns (16)	Tyus Jones (7)	Spectrum Center; 15,576	32–40
73	March 23	@ Memphis	W 112–99	Karl-Anthony Towns (33)	Karl-Anthony Towns (23)	Tyus Jones (9)	FedExForum; 16,977	33–40
74	March 26	L. A. Clippers	L 111–122	Karl-Anthony Towns (24)	Karl-Anthony Towns (13)	Tyus Jones (8)	Target Center; 13,176	33–41
75	March 29	Golden State	W 131–130 (OT)	Andrew Wiggins (24)	Karl-Anthony Towns (13)	Karl-Anthony Towns (7)	Target Center; 18,978	34–41
76	March 30	Philadelphia	L 109–118	Andrew Wiggins (24)	Karl-Anthony Towns (7)	Jerryd Bayless (7)	Target Center; 18,978	34–42

April : 2–4 (home: 1–3; road: 1–1)

Game	Date	Team	Score	High points	High rebounds	High assists	Location Attendance	Record
77	April 1	Portland	L 122–132	Andrew Wiggins (21)	Karl-Anthony Towns (12)	Tyus Jones (10)	Target Center; 11,209	34–43
78	April 3	@ Dallas	W 110–108	Karl-Anthony Towns (28)	Karl-Anthony Towns (13)	Andrew Wiggins (7)	American Airlines Center; 19,576	35–43
79	April 5	Miami	W 111–109	Šarić, Dieng (19)	Karl-Anthony Towns (12)	Šarić, Bayless (5)	Target Center; 17,763	36–43
80	April 7	Oklahoma City	L 126–132	Karl-Anthony Towns (35)	Karl-Anthony Towns (7)	Tyus Jones (13)	Target Center; 18,978	36–44
81	April 9	Toronto	L 100–120	Wiggins, Dieng (16)	Dario Šarić (9)	Tyus Jones (10)	Target Center; 16,119	36–45
82	April 10	@ Denver	L 95–99	Andrew Wiggins (25)	Gorgui Dieng (11)	Tyus Jones (8)	Pepsi Center; 16,332	36–46

2018–19 season schedule

== Player statistics ==
=== Regular season ===
Player	POS	GP	GS	MP	REB	AST	STL	BLK	PTS	MPG	RPG	APG	SPG	BPG	PPG
Karl-Anthony Towns	C	77	77	2,545	954	259	67	125	1,880	33.1	12.4	3.4	.9	1.6	24.4
Gorgui Dieng	C	76	2	1,031	311	72	48	41	485	13.6	4.1	.9	.6	.5	6.4
Josh Okogie	SG	74	52	1,757	218	91	88	33	570	23.7	2.9	1.2	1.2	.4	7.7
Andrew Wiggins	SF	73	73	2,543	352	184	70	48	1,321	34.8	4.8	2.5	1.0	.7	18.1
Taj Gibson	PF	70	57	1,686	458	84	53	39	753	24.1	6.5	1.2	.8	.6	10.8
Dario Šarić^{†}	PF	68	28	1,627	371	101	41	6	714	23.9	5.5	1.5	.6	.1	10.5
Tyus Jones	PG	68	23	1,560	134	327	81	5	468	22.9	2.0	4.8	1.2	.1	6.9
Anthony Tolliver	PF	65	0	1,079	177	46	17	21	326	16.6	2.7	.7	.3	.3	5.0
Derrick Rose	SG	51	13	1,392	140	220	31	12	917	27.3	2.7	4.3	.6	.2	18.0
Jeff Teague	PG	42	41	1,264	106	343	43	18	510	30.1	2.5	8.2	1.0	.4	12.1
Jerryd Bayless	PG	34	6	657	62	119	18	2	209	19.3	1.8	3.5	.5	.1	6.1
Keita Bates-Diop	SF	30	3	503	83	17	18	14	151	16.8	2.8	.6	.6	.5	5.0
Robert Covington^{†}	SF	22	22	763	126	32	50	24	318	34.7	5.7	1.5	2.3	1.1	14.5
Luol Deng	SF	22	2	392	73	18	15	8	157	17.8	3.3	.8	.7	.4	7.1
Cameron Reynolds	SG	19	0	259	31	13	6	2	95	13.6	1.6	.7	.3	.1	5.0
C. J. Williams	SG	15	0	128	8	12	6	0	39	8.5	.5	.8	.4	.0	2.6
Jared Terrell	SG	14	0	111	6	12	3	2	31	7.9	.4	.9	.2	.1	2.2
James Nunnally^{†}	SF	13	0	64	4	5	1	0	27	4.9	.3	.4	.1	.0	2.1
Jimmy Butler^{†}	SG	10	10	361	52	43	24	10	213	36.1	5.2	4.3	2.4	1.0	21.3
Isaiah Canaan^{†}	PG	7	1	95	5	19	2	1	33	13.6	.7	2.7	.3	.1	4.7
Mitch Creek^{†}	SF	1	0	12	2	1	1	0	6	12.0	2.0	1.0	1.0	.0	6.0

- ^{†} Denotes player spent time with another team in the season. Stats reflect time with the Timberwolves only.

== Transactions ==
=== Free agents ===
==== Re-signed ====
Player	Signed
Derrick Rose	July 4, 2018

==== Additions ====
Player	Signed	Former Team
Jared Terrell	Two-way contract	Rhode Island Rams
Anthony Tolliver	July 9, 2018	Detroit Pistons
C. J. Williams	Two-way contract	Los Angeles Clippers
James Nunnally	August 7, 2018	(Turkey) Fenerbahçe Doğuş
Luol Deng	September 10, 2018	Los Angeles Lakers
Darius Johnson-Odom	September 24, 2018	(Italy) Vanoli Cremona
Jonathan Stark	September 24, 2018	Murray State Racers

==== Subtractions ====
Player	Reason Left	New Team
Cole Aldrich	Waived	Atlanta Hawks
Nemanja Bjelica	Free agency	Sacramento Kings
Amile Jefferson	Two-way contract	Orlando Magic
Anthony Brown	Free agency	Philadelphia 76ers
