= 2018–19 Boston Celtics season =

Season of National Basketball Association team the Boston Celtics

- Head coach: Brad Stevens
- General manager: Danny Ainge
- Owners: Boston Basketball Partners
- Arena: TD Garden

Results
- Record: 49–33 (.598)
- Place: Division: 3rd (Atlantic); Conference: 4th (Eastern)
- Playoff finish: Conference semifinals (lost to Bucks 1–4)
- Stats at Basketball Reference

Local media
- Television: NBC Sports Boston
- Radio: WBZ-FM

The 2018–19 Boston Celtics season was the 73rd season of the franchise in the National Basketball Association (NBA).

In the playoffs, the Celtics swept the Indiana Pacers in the First Round. It was the first time since 2011 that the Celtics swept their opponent in the First Round. In the conference semifinals, the Celtics lost to the Milwaukee Bucks in five games.

Just days before the second round matchup with the Bucks, Celtics legend John Havlicek, died on Thursday, April 25 at the age of 79. The team wore a black band with a white #17 (in honor of Havlicek) for Game 1 of the semi-final series with the Bucks which the Celtics won.

As of 2026, this is the last full season where the Celtics did not finish 2nd or better in the Eastern Conference.

== Draft picks ==
Round	Pick	Player	Position	Nationality	College / Club
1	27	Robert Williams III	C	United States	Texas A&M

The Celtics entered the draft with a single first-round pick. They had traded their second-round pick to the Oklahoma City Thunder in 2015.

== Roster ==
2018–19 Boston Celtics roster
Players

Pos.	No.	Player	Height	Weight	DOB	From
C	46	Aron Baynes	6 ft 10 in (2.08 m)	260 lb (118 kg)	1986–12–09	Washington State
G	7	Jaylen Brown	6 ft 7 in (2.01 m)	220 lb (100 kg)	1996–10–24	California
G	50	PJ Dozier (TW)	6 ft 6 in (1.98 m)	205 lb (93 kg)	1996–10–25	South Carolina
G	8	Jonathan Gibson	6 ft 2 in (1.88 m)	185 lb (84 kg)	1987–11–08	New Mexico State
F	20	Gordon Hayward	6 ft 8 in (2.03 m)	225 lb (102 kg)	1990–03–23	Butler
F/C	42	Al Horford	6 ft 10 in (2.08 m)	245 lb (111 kg)	1986–06–03	Florida
G	28	R. J. Hunter (TW)	6 ft 5 in (1.96 m)	185 lb (84 kg)	1993–10–24	Georgia State
G	11	Kyrie Irving	6 ft 3 in (1.91 m)	193 lb (88 kg)	1992–03–23	Duke
F	13	Marcus Morris	6 ft 10 in (2.08 m)	235 lb (107 kg)	1989–09–02	Kansas
F	37	Semi Ojeleye	6 ft 7 in (2.01 m)	241 lb (109 kg)	1994–12–05	SMU
G	12	Terry Rozier	6 ft 1 in (1.85 m)	190 lb (86 kg)	1994–03–17	Louisville
G	36	Marcus Smart	6 ft 4 in (1.93 m)	220 lb (100 kg)	1994–03–06	Oklahoma State
F	0	Jayson Tatum	6 ft 8 in (2.03 m)	208 lb (94 kg)	1998–03–03	Duke
F	27	Daniel Theis	6 ft 9 in (2.06 m)	243 lb (110 kg)	1992–04–04	Germany
G	9	Brad Wanamaker	6 ft 4 in (1.93 m)	210 lb (95 kg)	1989–07–25	Pittsburgh
C	44	Robert Williams III	6 ft 10 in (2.08 m)	240 lb (109 kg)	1997–10–17	Texas A&M
F	30	Guerschon Yabusele	6 ft 8 in (2.03 m)	260 lb (118 kg)	1995–12–17	France

Coaches
Head coach
- Brad Stevens
Assistant(s)
- Jerome Allen
- Jay Larrañaga
- Scott Morrison
- Micah Shrewsberry
- Jamie Young

Legend
- (DP) Unsigned draft pick
- (FA) Free agent
- (S) Suspended
- (GL) On assignment to G League affiliate
- (TW) Two-way affiliate player
- Injured

Roster
Updated: 2019–04–14

== Standings ==
=== Division ===
Atlantic Division	W	L	PCT	GB	Home	Road	Div	GP
y – Toronto Raptors	58	24	.707	–	32‍–‍9	26‍–‍15	12–4	82
x – Philadelphia 76ers	51	31	.622	7.0	31‍–‍10	20‍–‍21	8–8	82
x – Boston Celtics	49	33	.598	9.0	28‍–‍13	21‍–‍20	10–6	82
x – Brooklyn Nets	42	40	.512	16.0	23‍–‍18	19‍–‍22	8–8	82
New York Knicks	17	65	.207	41.0	9‍–‍32	8‍–‍33	2–14	82

=== Conference ===
Eastern Conference
#	Team	W	L	PCT	GB	GP
1	z – Milwaukee Bucks *	60	22	.732	–	82
2	y – Toronto Raptors *	58	24	.707	2.0	82
3	x – Philadelphia 76ers	51	31	.622	9.0	82
4	x – Boston Celtics	49	33	.598	11.0	82
5	x – Indiana Pacers	48	34	.585	12.0	82
6	x – Brooklyn Nets	42	40	.512	18.0	82
7	y – Orlando Magic *	42	40	.512	18.0	82
8	x – Detroit Pistons	41	41	.500	19.0	82
9	Charlotte Hornets	39	43	.476	21.0	82
10	Miami Heat	39	43	.476	21.0	82
11	Washington Wizards	32	50	.390	28.0	82
12	Atlanta Hawks	29	53	.354	31.0	82
13	Chicago Bulls	22	60	.268	38.0	82
14	Cleveland Cavaliers	19	63	.232	41.0	82
15	New York Knicks	17	65	.207	43.0	82

- * notes division leader

== Game log ==
=== Preseason ===
2018 preseason game log
Total: 1–3 (home: 1–1; road: 0–2)
Preseason: 1–3 (home: 1–1; road: 0–2)

Game	Date	Team	Score	High points	High rebounds	High assists	Location Attendance	Record
1	September 28	@ Charlotte	97–104	Brown (14)	Ojeleye (8)	Horford, Irving (3)	Dean Smith Center; 18,081	0–1
2	September 30	Charlotte	115–112	Irving (20)	Baynes, Morris (6)	Irving, Rozier (4)	TD Garden; 18,624	1–1
3	October 2	Cleveland	95–102	Smart (15)	Baynes (7)	Horford (4)	TD Garden; 18,624	1–2
4	October 6	@ Cleveland	102–113	Morris, Rozier (17)	Baynes (6)	Horford (7)	Quicken Loans Arena; 17,083	1–3

2018–19 season schedule

=== Regular season ===
2018–19 game log
Total: 49–33 (home: 28–13; road: 21–20)
October: 5–2 (home: 2–1; road: 3–1)

Game	Date	Team	Score	High points	High rebounds	High assists	Location Attendance	Record
1	October 16	Philadelphia	105–87	Jayson Tatum (23)	Marcus Morris (10)	Kyrie Irving (7)	TD Garden; 18,624	1–0
2	October 19	@ Toronto	101–113	Kyrie Irving (21)	Al Horford (10)	Kyrie Irving (6)	Scotiabank Arena; 19,800	1–1
3	October 20	@ New York	103–101	Jayson Tatum (24)	Jayson Tatum (14)	Irving, Smart (5)	Madison Square Garden; 19,427	2–1
4	October 22	Orlando	90–93	Kyrie Irving (29)	Jayson Tatum (10)	Kyrie Irving (5)	TD Garden; 18,624	2–2
5	October 25	@ Oklahoma City	101–95	Jayson Tatum (24)	Marcus Morris (10)	Kyrie Irving (5)	Chesapeake Energy Arena; 18,203	3–2
6	October 27	@ Detroit	109–89	Jaylen Brown (19)	Morris, Theis (8)	Marcus Smart (9)	Little Caesars Arena; 18,120	4–2
7	October 30	Detroit	108–105	Kyrie Irving (31)	Marcus Morris (9)	Kyrie Irving (5)	TD Garden; 18,624	5–2

November : 7–8 (home: 4–2; road: 3–6)

Game	Date	Team	Score	High points	High rebounds	High assists	Location Attendance	Record
8	November 1	Milwaukee	117–113	Kyrie Irving (28)	Terry Rozier (7)	Al Horford (8)	TD Garden; 18,624	6–2
9	November 3	@ Indiana	101–102	Marcus Morris (23)	Brown, Hayward (7)	Marcus Smart (9)	Bankers Life Fieldhouse; 17,505	6–3
10	November 5	@ Denver	107–115	Kyrie Irving (31)	Gordon Hayward (9)	Al Horford (6)	Pepsi Center; 19,520	6–4
11	November 8	@ Phoenix	116–109 (OT)	Kyrie Irving (39)	Morris, Tatum (8)	Kyrie Irving (6)	Talking Stick Resort Arena; 17,359	7–4
12	November 9	@ Utah	115–123	Terry Rozier (22)	Terry Rozier (6)	Marcus Smart (10)	Vivint Smart Home Arena; 18,306	7–5
13	November 11	@ Portland	94–100	Jayson Tatum (27)	Gordon Hayward (9)	Kyrie Irving (6)	Moda Center; 19,712	7–6
14	November 14	Chicago	111–82	Jaylen Brown (18)	Aron Baynes (11)	Kyrie Irving (7)	TD Garden; 18,624	8–6
15	November 16	Toronto	123–116 (OT)	Kyrie Irving (43)	Al Horford (9)	Kyrie Irving (11)	TD Garden; 18,624	9–6
16	November 17	Utah	86–98	Kyrie Irving (20)	Kyrie Irving (8)	Hayward, Smart, Rozier (3)	TD Garden; 18,624	9–7
17	November 19	@ Charlotte	112–117	Kyrie Irving (27)	Gordon Hayward (8)	Kyrie Irving (11)	Spectrum Center; 18,040	9–8
18	November 21	New York	109–117	Kyrie Irving (22)	Morris, Tatum (8)	Kyrie Irving (13)	TD Garden; 18,624	9–9
19	November 23	@ Atlanta	114–96	Aron Baynes (16)	Aron Baynes (9)	Marcus Smart (7)	State Farm Arena; 15,017	10–9
20	November 24	@ Dallas	104–113	Jayson Tatum (21)	Aron Baynes (9)	Kyrie Irving (6)	American Airlines Center; 20,226	10–10
21	November 26	@ New Orleans	124–107	Kyrie Irving (26)	Marcus Morris (11)	Kyrie Irving (10)	Smoothie King Center; 15,189	11–10
22	November 30	Cleveland	128–95	Kyrie Irving (29)	Aron Baynes (9)	Marcus Smart (7)	TD Garden; 18,624	12–10

December : 9–5 (home: 5–2; road: 4–3)

Game	Date	Team	Score	High points	High rebounds	High assists	Location Attendance	Record
23	December 1	@ Minnesota	118–109	Gordon Hayward (30)	Jayson Tatum (9)	Kyrie Irving (9)	Target Center; 17,663	13–10
24	December 6	New York	128–100	Kyrie Irving (22)	Al Horford (12)	Kyrie Irving (8)	TD Garden; 18,624	14–10
25	December 8	@ Chicago	133–77	Jaylen Brown (23)	Daniel Theis (10)	Gordon Hayward (6)	United Center; 20,923	15–10
26	December 10	New Orleans	113–100	Marcus Morris (31)	Robert Williams III (11)	Terry Rozier (6)	TD Garden; 18,624	16–10
27	December 12	@ Washington	130–125 (OT)	Kyrie Irving (38)	Jayson Tatum (12)	Kyrie Irving (7)	Capital One Arena; 20,409	17–10
28	December 14	Atlanta	129–108	Kyrie Irving (24)	Theis, Rozier (7)	Marcus Smart (7)	TD Garden; 18,624	18–10
29	December 15	@ Detroit	104–113	Kyrie Irving (24)	Irving, Tatum, Smart (8)	Kyrie Irving (4)	Little Caesars Arena; 14,500	18–11
30	December 19	Phoenix	103–111	Kyrie Irving (29)	Williams III, Tatum (8)	Kyrie Irving (10)	TD Garden; 18,624	18–12
31	December 21	Milwaukee	107–120	Jayson Tatum (20)	Kyrie Irving (9)	Kyrie Irving (7)	TD Garden; 18,624	18–13
32	December 23	Charlotte	119–103	Kyrie Irving (25)	Marcus Morris (8)	Terry Rozier (6)	TD Garden; 18,624	19–13
33	December 25	Philadelphia	121–114 (OT)	Kyrie Irving (40)	Irving, Tatum (10)	Al Horford (5)	TD Garden; 18,624	20–13
34	December 27	@ Houston	113–127	Kyrie Irving (23)	Morris, Hayward (6)	Kyrie Irving (11)	Toyota Center; 18,055	20–14
35	December 29	@ Memphis	112–103	Kyrie Irving (26)	Jayson Tatum (8)	Kyrie Irving (13)	FedExForum; 17,794	21–14
36	December 31	@ San Antonio	111–120	Jaylen Brown (30)	Jayson Tatum (11)	Kyrie Irving (8)	AT&T Center; 18,354	21–15

January : 11–4 (home: 10–1; road: 1–3)

Game	Date	Team	Score	High points	High rebounds	High assists	Location Attendance	Record
37	January 2	Minnesota	115–102	Gordon Hayward (35)	Horford, Brown (5)	Marcus Smart (8)	TD Garden; 18,624	22–15
38	January 4	Dallas	114–93	Jaylen Brown (21)	Daniel Theis (13)	Horford, Hayward (8)	TD Garden; 18,624	23–15
39	January 7	Brooklyn	116–95	Kyrie Irving (17)	Al Horford (9)	Marcus Smart (7)	TD Garden; 18,624	24–15
40	January 9	Indiana	135–108	Morris, Brown (22)	Marcus Morris (8)	Al Horford (8)	TD Garden; 18,624	25–15
41	January 10	@ Miami	99–115	Kyrie Irving (22)	Morris, Rozier (6)	Kyrie Irving (5)	American Airlines Arena; 19,600	25–16
42	January 12	@ Orlando	103–105	Kyrie Irving (25)	Al Horford (11)	Kyrie Irving (6)	Amway Center; 18,846	25–17
43	January 14	@ Brooklyn	102–109	Jayson Tatum (34)	Morris, Brown (6)	Terry Rozier (5)	Barclays Center; 16,247	25–18
44	January 16	Toronto	117–108	Kyrie Irving (27)	Jayson Tatum (10)	Kyrie Irving (18)	TD Garden; 18,624	26–18
45	January 18	Memphis	122–116	Kyrie Irving (38)	Aron Baynes (12)	Kyrie Irving (11)	TD Garden; 18,624	27–18
46	January 19	@ Atlanta	113–105	Kyrie Irving (32)	Al Horford (9)	Kyrie Irving (5)	State Farm Arena; 16,626	28–18
47	January 21	Miami	107–99	Kyrie Irving (26)	Al Horford (10)	Kyrie Irving (12)	TD Garden; 18,624	29–18
48	January 23	Cleveland	123–103	Terry Rozier (26)	Terry Rozier (8)	Terry Rozier (6)	TD Garden; 18,624	30–18
49	January 26	Golden State	111–115	Kyrie Irving (32)	Al Horford (10)	Kyrie Irving (13)	TD Garden; 18,624	30–19
50	January 28	Brooklyn	112–104	Brown, Smart (21)	Al Horford (11)	Smart, Rozier (7)	TD Garden; 18,624	31–19
51	January 30	Charlotte	126–94	Jaylen Brown (24)	Jaylen Brown (10)	Terry Rozier (10)	TD Garden; 18,624	32–19

February : 5–6 (home: 2–3; road: 3–3)

Game	Date	Team	Score	High points	High rebounds	High assists	Location Attendance	Record
52	February 1	@ New York	113–99	Kyrie Irving (23)	Kyrie Irving (10)	Irving, Rozier (6)	Madison Square Garden; 18,343	33–19
53	February 3	Oklahoma City	134–129	Kyrie Irving (30)	Morris, Tatum, Rozier (7)	Kyrie Irving (11)	TD Garden; 18,624	34–19
54	February 5	@ Cleveland	103–96	Jayson Tatum (25)	Brown, Tatum (7)	Al Horford (8)	Quicken Loans Arena; 19,432	35–19
55	February 7	L. A. Lakers	128–129	Kyrie Irving (24)	Jayson Tatum (10)	Kyrie Irving (8)	TD Garden; 18,624	35–20
56	February 9	L. A. Clippers	112–123	Gordon Hayward (19)	Jayson Tatum (8)	Smart, Horford (5)	TD Garden; 18,624	35–21
57	February 12	@ Philadelphia	112–109	Gordon Hayward (26)	Jayson Tatum (10)	Rozier, Horford (5)	Wells Fargo Center; 20,582	36–21
58	February 13	Detroit	118–110	Gordon Hayward (18)	Al Horford (14)	Hayward, Horford (8)	TD Garden; 18,624	37–21
All-Star Break
59	February 21	@ Milwaukee	97–98	Kyrie Irving (22)	Al Horford (17)	Irving, Horford (8)	Fiserv Forum; 17,926	37–22
60	February 23	@ Chicago	116–126	Kyrie Irving (37)	Morris, Smart (6)	Kyrie Irving (10)	United Center; 21,295	37–23
61	February 26	@ Toronto	95–118	Marcus Morris (15)	Jaylen Brown (8)	Irving, Horford (5)	Scotiabank Arena; 19,800	37–24
62	February 27	Portland	92–97	Kyrie Irving (31)	Jaylen Brown (10)	Smart, Horford (5)	TD Garden; 18,624	37–25

March : 8–7 (home: 4–3; road: 4–4)

Game	Date	Team	Score	High points	High rebounds	High assists	Location Attendance	Record
63	March 1	Washington	107–96	Al Horford (18)	Marcus Morris (9)	Kyrie Irving (12)	TD Garden; 18,624	38–25
64	March 3	Houston	104–115	Kyrie Irving (24)	Kyrie Irving (9)	Irving, Smart (6)	TD Garden; 18,624	38–26
65	March 5	@ Golden State	128–95	Gordon Hayward (30)	Gordon Hayward (7)	Kyrie Irving (11)	Oracle Arena; 19,596	39–26
66	March 6	@ Sacramento	111–109	Jayson Tatum (24)	Al Horford (11)	Al Horford (7)	Golden 1 Center; 17,583	40–26
67	March 9	@ L. A. Lakers	120–107	Kyrie Irving (30)	Al Horford (8)	Irving, Smart, Tatum (5)	Staples Center; 18,997	41–26
68	March 11	@ L. A. Clippers	115–140	Terry Rozier (26)	Jaylen Brown (7)	Kyrie Irving (11)	Staples Center; 19,068	41–27
69	March 14	Sacramento	126–120	Kyrie Irving (31)	Marcus Morris (13)	Kyrie Irving (12)	TD Garden; 18,624	42–27
70	March 16	Atlanta	129–120	Kyrie Irving (30)	Irving, Morris (11)	Kyrie Irving (9)	TD Garden; 18,624	43–27
71	March 18	Denver	105–114	Kyrie Irving (30)	Jayson Tatum (7)	Tatum, Horford (6)	TD Garden; 18,624	43–28
72	March 20	@ Philadelphia	115–118	Kyrie Irving (36)	Irving, Morris (9)	Al Horford (5)	Wells Fargo Center; 20,606	43–29
73	March 23	@ Charlotte	117–124	Kyrie Irving (31)	Marcus Morris (9)	Marcus Smart (8)	Spectrum Center; 19,438	43–30
74	March 24	San Antonio	96–115	Marcus Smart (14)	Gordon Hayward (10)	Kyrie Irving (12)	TD Garden; 18,624	43–31
75	March 26	@ Cleveland	116–106	Smart, Tatum (21)	Al Horford (8)	Al Horford (5)	Quicken Loans Arena; 19,432	44–31
76	March 29	Indiana	114–112	Kyrie Irving (30)	Aron Baynes (13)	Marcus Smart (6)	TD Garden; 18,624	45–31
77	March 30	@ Brooklyn	96–110	Gordon Hayward (19)	Hayward, Brown (6)	Terry Rozier (4)	Barclays Center; 17,732	45–32

April : 4–1 (home: 1–1; road: 3–0)

Game	Date	Team	Score	High points	High rebounds	High assists	Location Attendance	Record
78	April 1	Miami	110–105	Kyrie Irving (25)	Baynes, Horford (11)	Al Horford (10)	TD Garden; 18,624	46–32
79	April 3	@ Miami	112–102	Gordon Hayward (25)	Aron Baynes (10)	Gordon Hayward (5)	American Airlines Arena; 19,904	47–32
80	April 5	@ Indiana	117–97	Jayson Tatum (22)	Aron Baynes (11)	Kyrie Irving (6)	Bankers Life Fieldhouse; 17,371	48–32
81	April 7	Orlando	108–116	Kyrie Irving (23)	Marcus Morris (8)	Al Horford (7)	TD Garden; 18,624	48–33
82	April 9	@ Washington	116–110	Terry Rozier (21)	Dozier, Williams (11)	Brad Wanamaker (7)	Capital One Arena; 20,409	49–33

2018–19 season schedule

=== Playoffs ===
2019 playoff game log
Total: 5–4 (home: 2–2; road: 3–2)
First Round: 4–0 (home: 2–0; road: 2–0)

Game	Date	Team	Score	High points	High rebounds	High assists	Location Attendance	Series
1	April 14	Indiana	84–74	Irving, Morris (20)	Al Horford (11)	Kyrie Irving (7)	TD Garden; 18,624	1–0
2	April 17	Indiana	99–91	Kyrie Irving (37)	Al Horford (10)	Kyrie Irving (7)	TD Garden; 18,624	2–0
3	April 19	@ Indiana	104–96	Jaylen Brown (23)	Al Horford (8)	Kyrie Irving (10)	Bankers Life Fieldhouse; 17,923	3–0
4	April 21	@ Indiana	110–106	Gordon Hayward (20)	Al Horford (12)	Kyrie Irving (7)	Bankers Life Fieldhouse; 17,923	4–0

Conference Semifinals: 1–4 (home: 0–2; road: 1–2)

Game	Date	Team	Score	High points	High rebounds	High assists	Location Attendance	Series
1	April 28	@ Milwaukee	112–90	Kyrie Irving (26)	Al Horford (11)	Kyrie Irving (11)	Fiserv Forum; 17,341	1–0
2	April 30	@ Milwaukee	102–123	Marcus Morris (17)	Horford, Rozier (8)	Kyrie Irving (4)	Fiserv Forum; 17,536	1–1
3	May 3	Milwaukee	116–123	Kyrie Irving (29)	Jayson Tatum (11)	Kyrie Irving (6)	TD Garden; 18,624	1–2
4	May 6	Milwaukee	101–113	Kyrie Irving (23)	Marcus Morris (14)	Kyrie Irving (10)	TD Garden; 18,624	1–3
5	May 8	@ Milwaukee	91–116	Kyrie Irving (15)	Marcus Morris (11)	Al Horford (6)	Fiserv Forum; 17,701	1–4

2019 playoff schedule

== Player statistics ==
=== Regular season ===
Player	Pos.	GP	GS	MP	Reb.	Ast.	Stl.	Blk.	Pts.
Aron Baynes	C	51	18	821	240	57	12	34	284
Jaylen Brown	SG	74	25	1,913	313	100	69	32	964
PJ Dozier	SG	6	0	51	17	5	2	0	19
Gordon Hayward	PF	72	18	1,863	322	244	62	23	825
Al Horford	C	68	68	1,973	458	283	59	86	925
R. J. Hunter^{≠}	SG	1	0	26	3	3	1	0	17
Kyrie Irving	PG	67	67	2,214	335	464	103	34	1,596
Greg Monroe^{≠}	C	2	0	5	3	1	0	0	6
Marcus Morris	PF	75	53	2,091	458	109	43	25	1,046
Semi Ojeleye	PF	56	3	594	86	23	10	4	186
Terry Rozier	PG	79	14	1,791	307	231	68	21	708
Marcus Smart	SG	80	60	2,200	234	321	143	28	708
Jayson Tatum	SF	79	79	2,455	477	168	84	57	1,243
Daniel Theis	C	66	2	908	225	68	21	42	374
Brad Wanamaker	PG	36	0	343	41	56	12	2	140
Robert Williams III	C	32	2	283	81	7	9	40	81
Guerschon Yabusele	PF	41	1	251	53	15	8	7	94

After all games.
^{‡}Waived during the season
^{†}Traded during the season
^{≠}Acquired during the season

=== Playoffs ===
Player	Pos.	GP	GS	MP	Reb.	Ast.	Stl.	Blk.	Pts.
Aron Baynes	C	9	5	115	25	3	3	3	19
Jaylen Brown	SG	9	9	274	52	10	6	2	125
Gordon Hayward	PF	9	0	267	36	22	6	3	86
Al Horford	C	9	9	310	81	40	4	7	125
Kyrie Irving	PG	9	9	330	40	63	12	4	192
Marcus Morris	PF	9	4	254	73	11	1	5	123
Semi Ojeleye	PF	6	0	34	2	2	0	0	13
Terry Rozier	PG	9	0	162	39	17	4	2	58
Marcus Smart	SG	2	0	32	4	4	3	0	7
Jayson Tatum	SF	9	9	295	60	17	10	7	137
Daniel Theis	C	7	0	42	10	0	1	1	12
Brad Wanamaker	PG	4	0	17	1	3	1	0	10
Robert Williams III	C	3	0	13	7	0	0	0	4
Guerschon Yabusele	PF	4	0	14	2	1	0	1	8

== Transactions ==
=== Trades ===
July 23, 2018	To Boston Celtics Rodney Purvis	To Oklahoma City Thunder Abdel Nader; Cash considerations

=== Re-signed ===
Player	Signed
Aron Baynes	July 7, 2018
Marcus Smart	July 19, 2018
Jabari Bird	July 26, 2018

==== Additions ====
Player	Signed	Former Team
Brad Wanamaker	July 2, 2018	(Turkey) Fenerbahçe Doğuş
Walt Lemon Jr.	Two-way contract	Fort Wayne Mad Ants
PJ Dozier	Two-way contract	Oklahoma City Thunder
Justin Bibbs	September 25, 2018	Virginia Tech Hokies
Nick King	September 25, 2018	Middle Tennessee Blue Raiders
Jeff Roberson	September 25, 2018	Vanderbilt Commodores

==== Subtractions ====
Player	Reason	New Team
Kadeem Allen	Waived	New York Knicks
Shane Larkin	Unrestricted free agent	(Turkey) Anadolu Efes
Rodney Purvis	Waived	Miami Heat
Greg Monroe	Unrestricted free agent	Philadelphia 76ers
