= Tom Thibodeau =

American basketball coach (born 1958)

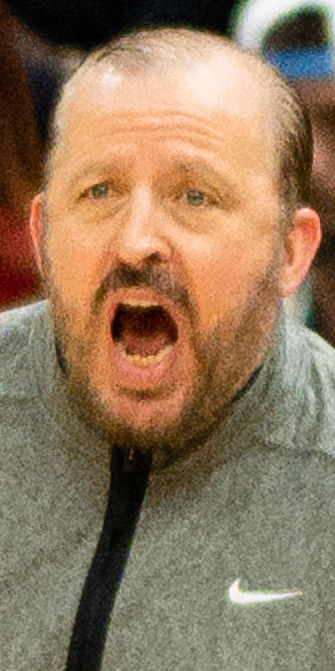
- Thibodeau as head coach of the New York Knicks in 2023

Personal information
- Born: January 17, 1958 (age 68) New Britain, Connecticut, U.S.
- Listed height: 6 ft 2 in (1.88 m)

Career information
- High school: New Britain (New Britain, Connecticut)
- College: Salem State (1977–1981)
- Coaching career: 1981–present

Career history

Coaching
- 1981–1984: Salem State (assistant)
- 1984–1985: Salem State
- 1985–1989: Harvard (assistant)
- 1989–1991: Minnesota Timberwolves (assistant)
- 1992–1994: San Antonio Spurs (assistant)
- 1994–1996: Philadelphia 76ers (assistant)
- 1996–2003: New York Knicks (assistant)
- 2003–2007: Houston Rockets (assistant)
- 2007–2010: Boston Celtics (associate HC)
- 2010–2015: Chicago Bulls
- 2016–2019: Minnesota Timberwolves
- 2020–2025: New York Knicks

Career highlights
- As head coach: 2× NBA Coach of the Year (2011, 2021); NBA All-Star Game head coach (2012); As assistant coach: NBA champion (2008)

Thomas Joseph Thibodeau Jr. (/ˈθɪbədoʊ/ THIB-ə-doh; born January 17, 1958), nicknamed "Thibs" (/ˈtɪbz/ TIBZ), is an American basketball coach who was most recently the head coach for the New York Knicks of the National Basketball Association (NBA). He served as an assistant coach for the United States men's national team from 2013 to 2016, and helped them win a gold medal at the 2016 Olympic Games.

As a defensive coach, he helped the Houston Rockets rank among the top 5 in the league in scoring defense and field goal percentage defense from 2004 to 2007, and he has helped his team finish in the league's top 10 in team defense 15 times. He was part of the 1999 NBA Finals as an assistant coach with the New York Knicks before joining the Boston Celtics as a defensive coach. With the Celtics, he won the 2008 NBA Finals as well as helping guide them back to the 2010 NBA Finals.

In 2010, he became head coach of the Chicago Bulls. He was named the NBA Coach of the Year after leading the Bulls to a 62-win season. He was head coach of the Minnesota Timberwolves from 2016 to 2019, before becoming the Knicks' head coach. He won the Coach of the Year award again in 2021 after leading the Knicks to their first playoff berth in eight seasons. In 2025, he led the Knicks to their first conference finals appearance in 25 years, and was fired at the end of the season. He has coached in 214 playoff games as an assistant coach, associate head coach, and head coach.

Thibodeau is renowned as a defensive specialist with significant regular season success, though he has also drawn criticism for playing his starters heavy minutes and his perceived stubbornness.

== Early life ==
Thibodeau was born on January 17, 1958 in New Britain, Connecticut to Thomas J. Thibodeau Sr. and Ann M. (Montanile) Thibodeau. He attended New Britain High School, where he excelled in basketball.

== College career ==
Thibodeau played basketball at Salem State College, serving as captain during the 1980–81 season. During his time with the Vikings, the six-foot-two-inch Thibodeau helped Salem State reach consecutive Division III national tournaments (1980, 1981). In 1980, Thibodeau helped Salem State win the league championship and the school's first NCAA Tournament bid.

== Coaching career ==
=== Salem State (1981–1985) ===
Upon graduating, he became an assistant coach at the school in 1981. In 1984, at age 25, he became head coach at Salem State after serving three years as an assistant.

=== Harvard (1985–1989) ===
One season later he became an assistant coach at Harvard University, where he spent the next four seasons.

While coaching in college, Thibodeau attended coaching clinics and visited the practices of many of the top coaches in the U.S., including Hall of Fame coaches Bobby Knight, Rick Pitino, Hubie Brown, Gary Williams, Morgan Wootten, and Jim Calhoun. In 1987, Thibodeau befriended Bill Musselman, a former head coach in the NBA, ABA and NCAA who was coaching the Albany Patroons of the Continental Basketball Association. According to the New York Times, "the Patroons’ practices, the attention to detail, the efficiency, the sheer number of offensive sets, fed into Thibodeau's addiction."

=== Minnesota Timberwolves (1989–1991) ===
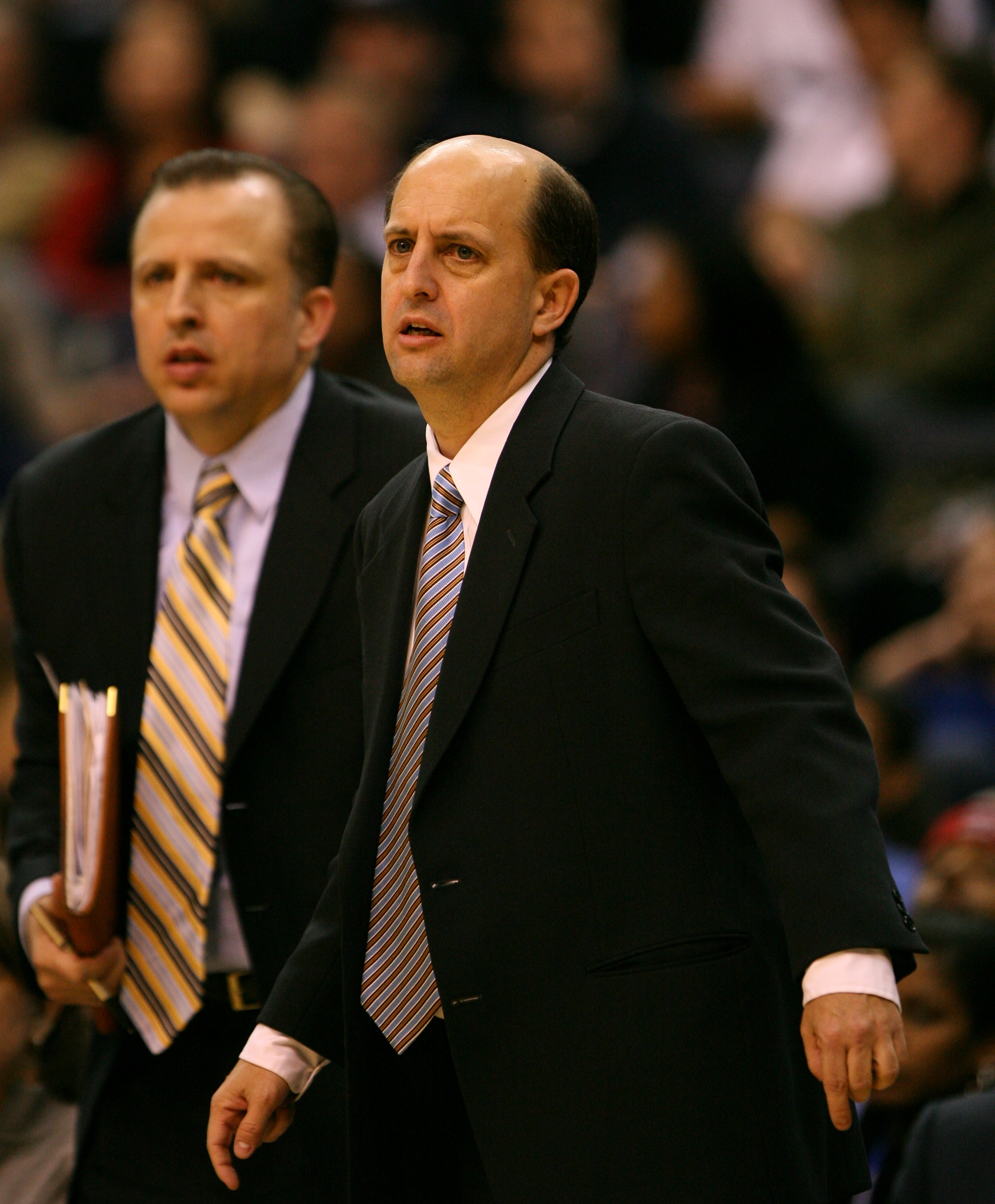
Thibodeau (left) as part of the Houston Rockets coaching staff with then head coach Jeff Van Gundy

After four years at Harvard, he entered the National Basketball Association (NBA) in 1989, as an assistant coach with an expansion team, the Minnesota Timberwolves, who had hired Bill Musselman as the team's first head coach. Prior to the 1991–92 season, he joined the Seattle SuperSonics as an advance scout.

=== San Antonio Spurs (1992–1994) ===
Thibodeau moved to the San Antonio Spurs the following season, where he worked as an assistant coach to Jerry Tarkanian, Rex Hughes and John Lucas for two seasons.

=== Philadelphia 76ers (1994–1996) ===
After the 1993–94 season, he left the Spurs along with Lucas to become an assistant under Lucas with the Philadelphia 76ers.

=== New York Knicks (1996–2003) ===
After the 1995–96 season, he again left simultaneously with Lucas, this time joining the New York Knicks as an assistant to head coach Jeff Van Gundy, who later said that Thibodeau was the best coach on the staff, even better than Van Gundy.

During his tenure with the Knicks, Thibodeau helped the team set a then-NBA record by holding 33 consecutive opponents under 100 points in the 2000–01 season. As part of the Knicks coaching staff, he also helped Van Gundy coach the Eastern Conference All-Stars in the 2000 All-Star Game. He spent seven years with the Knicks.

=== Houston Rockets (2003–2007) ===
Thibodeau joined the Houston Rockets prior to the 2003–04 season, where again he was an assistant to head coach Van Gundy, who has described Thibodeau as "brilliant".

=== Boston Celtics (2007–2010) ===
Thibodeau (right) as part of the Boston Celtics coaching staff

On August 30, 2007, Thibodeau was named associate head coach of the Boston Celtics, who hoped his hiring would bolster their defense. Eventually, he helped the Celtics become the best defensive team in the league. On November 4, 2007, Thibodeau took over head coaching duties against the Toronto Raptors in place of Doc Rivers, who was unable to coach due to the death of his father earlier that day.

During the 2008 playoffs, Thibodeau was rumored to be a candidate for the vacant head coaching job with the New York Knicks, for whom he had worked as an assistant coach for seven years, as well as the Chicago Bulls, but he was not hired by either.

Thibodeau led the Celtics to the best rating in several defensive categories in 2007–08, and was a key factor in containing Kobe Bryant during the 2008 Finals, which the Celtics won, earning Thibodeau his first NBA Championship.

=== Chicago Bulls (2010–2015) ===
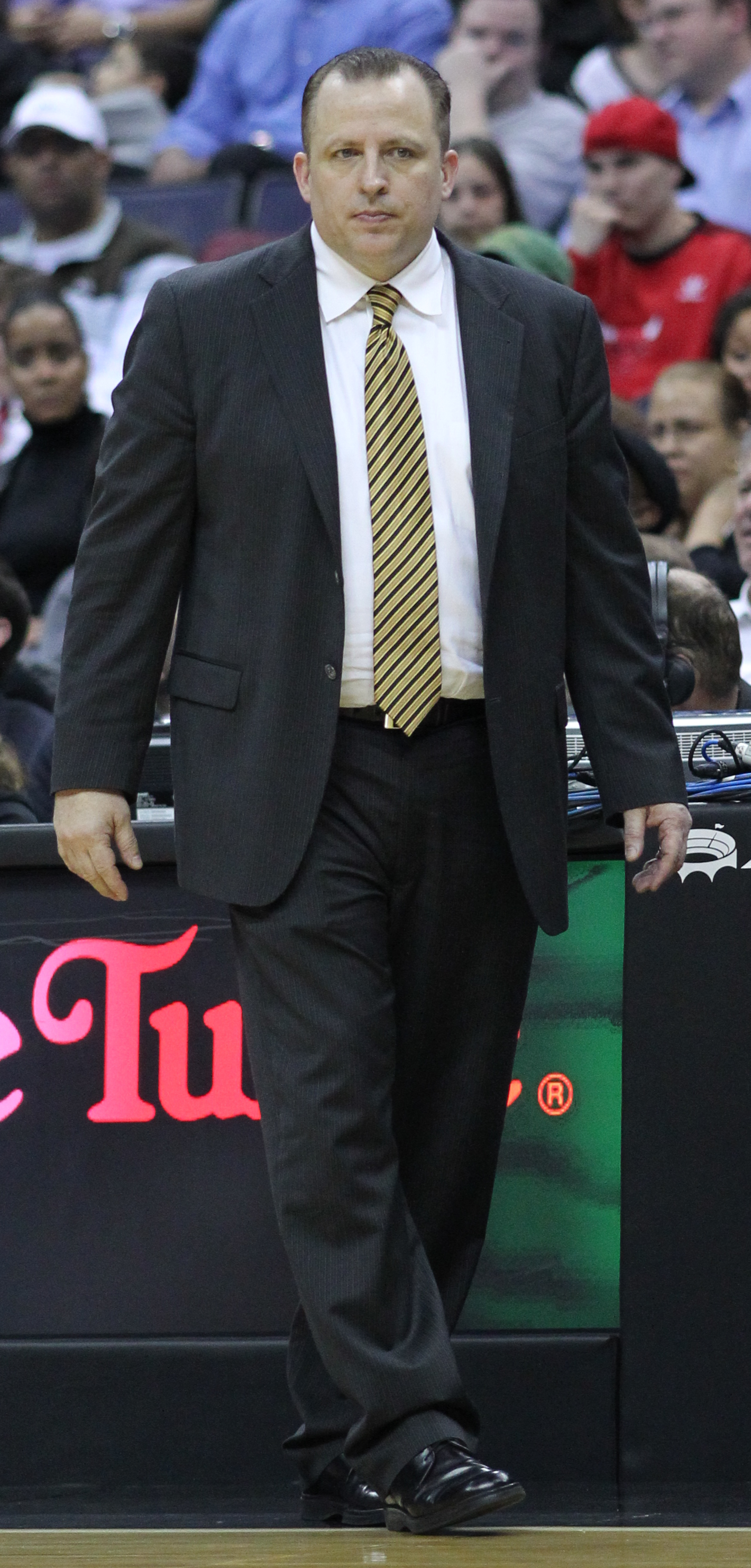
Thibodeau as head coach of the Chicago Bulls in 2011

On June 2, 2010, Thibodeau interviewed with officials from the Chicago Bulls for their vacant head coach position. On June 23, he was confirmed as the Bulls' head coach. Thibodeau was named the NBA Coach of the Year on May 1, 2011, after tying the record for most wins by a rookie head coach with 62. He also led the Bulls to their first 50-win season and first division title since the Michael Jordan era. The Bulls lost the Eastern Conference finals to the Miami Heat.

On February 14, 2012, Thibodeau clinched the position of Eastern Conference coach for the All-Star Game in Orlando. At the time, the Bulls were first in the Eastern Conference.

With a win over the Orlando Magic on March 19, 2012, Thibodeau became the fastest coach in NBA history to earn 100 career victories. He accomplished this in 130 games, one game fewer than the record set previously by Avery Johnson in 2006. Thibodeau and the Bulls were the East's top seed entering the playoffs and also had the league's best regular-season record and home-court advantage throughout the playoffs.

In Game 1 of the Bulls' first-round series against the Philadelphia 76ers, point guard Derrick Rose tore his ACL. Commenting on Thibodeau's decision to leave Rose in the game, Bulls general manager Gar Forman stated, "There is absolutely no issue there. It's a playoff game. They had cut a lead down (from 20) to 12. We're going to have our guys on the floor making sure we win the game. Tom is a terrific coach who does a lot of things well. One of the best things he does is pace our team."

Thibodeau finished second to Gregg Popovich of the San Antonio Spurs in 2012 NBA Coach of the Year voting. The Bulls' season was cut short after a 4–2 defeat by the 76ers.

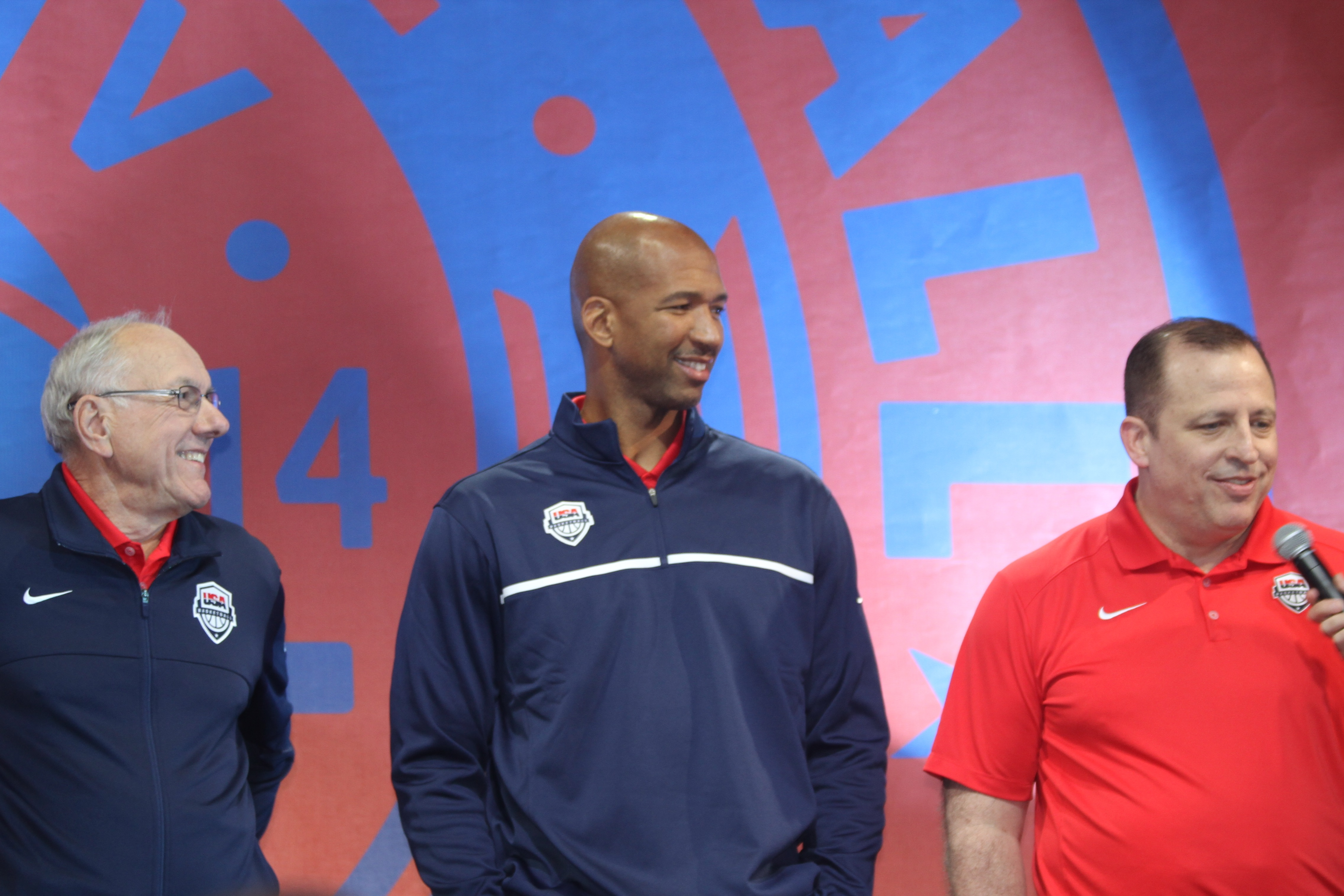
left to right: Jim Boeheim, Monty Williams, and Thibodeau served as assistant coaches for the 2014 United States FIBA World Cup team.

Rose missed the entire 2012–13 season, but despite his absence, the Bulls finished 45–37, second in the Central Division (behind the Indiana Pacers) and 5th in their conference. They defeated the Brooklyn Nets 4–3 (after leading 3–1) in the first round of the playoffs and lost to the Miami Heat 4–1 in the next round. On May 13, 2013, Thibodeau was fined $35,000 for defending his players while commenting on the seemingly inadequate foul calls by the referees during the Eastern Conference semifinals against the Miami Heat.

Thibodeau finished third in 2014 NBA Coach of the Year voting. He led the Bulls, without Rose for the second straight year, to the fourth-best record in the Eastern Conference. The Bulls' season ended with a 4–1 series loss to the fifth-seeded Washington Wizards.

Tension between the Bulls' front office and Thibodeau grew considerably over the 2014–15 season, which ended in a six-game series loss to the Cleveland Cavaliers in the Eastern Conference semifinals. Shortly thereafter, on May 28, 2015, the Bulls decided to move in a different direction and let go of Thibodeau.

=== USA Basketball ===
Thibodeau was named on June 10, 2013, an assistant coach for the 2013–16 United States men's national basketball team. As a member of the 2014–16 USA Basketball Men's National Team coach staff, Thibodeau assisted the US to a sterling overall record of 26–0. The USA finished 9–0 to win the gold medal at the 2014 FIBA World Cup in Spain, while the 2014 USA National Team compiled a 4–0 record during its exhibition tour before the World Cup. Two years later, Thibodeau was again on the USA bench and helped lead the U.S. to the 2016 Olympic championship as the Americans rolled to an 8–0 record and the gold medal in Rio de Janeiro, Brazil. Before heading to Rio, the 2016 USA National Team posted a 5–0 record during its domestic exhibition tour.

Head coach Mike Krzyzewski heaped enormous praise on Thibodeau, who served as his right-hand man during the victories. "Tom is one of the great coaches on this planet," Krzyzewski said. "To be honest, he talked to the team more than I did," said Krzyzewski.

=== Minnesota Timberwolves (2016–2019) ===
On April 20, 2016, it was announced that the Minnesota Timberwolves had hired Thibodeau as head coach and president of basketball operations. The Timberwolves had spent the better part of a decade in NBA purgatory, having not made the playoffs since 2004, Kevin Garnett’s lone MVP season. In his second season, the Timberwolves made their first playoff appearance in 14 years, losing in the First round to the top-seeded Houston Rockets in five games. The Timberwolves had a tumultuous off season involving the exit of Jimmy Butler from Minnesota. Thibodeau would be released from the Timberwolves in January 2019 after a period of regression following the end of the playoff drought.

=== New York Knicks (2020–2025) ===
On July 30, 2020, the New York Knicks announced that they hired Thibodeau as their head coach. In the shortened 2020–21 season, his first as head coach of the Knicks, Thibodeau guided the Knicks to their first playoff appearance since the 2012–13 season. After the season Thibodeau was named Coach of the Year for the second time in his career. During his stint in New York, Thibodeau was widely credited with returning the recently struggling franchise to regular playoff contention, including leading the Knicks to their first Eastern Conference Finals appearance in 25 years in 2025. Despite that playoff run, which included eliminating the defending champion Boston Celtics 4–2 in the Conference Semi-Finals, Thibodeau was relieved of his duties on June 3, 2025. The very next season, the Knicks would win the 2026 NBA Finals under Mike Brown, defeating the San Antonio Spurs in five games to win the franchise’s first championship in 53 years.

== Head coaching record ==
=== College ===
Record table
| Season | Team | Overall | Conference | Standing | Postseason |
|---|---|---|---|---|---|
Salem State Vikings (Massachusetts State Collegiate Athletic Conference) (1984–1985)
| 1984–85 | Salem State | 9–17 | 4–8 | 7th | |
| Salem State: | | 9–17 | 4–8 | | |
| Total: | | 9–17 | | | |

=== NBA ===
Legend
| Regular season | G | Games coached | W | Games won | L | Games lost | W–L % | Win–loss % |
| Playoffs | PG | Playoff games | PW | Playoff wins | PL | Playoff losses | PW–L % | Playoff win–loss % |

| Team | Year | G | W | L | W–L% | Finish | PG | PW | PL | PW–L% | Result |
|---|---|---|---|---|---|---|---|---|---|---|---|
| Chicago | 2010–11 | 82 | 62 | 20 | .756 | 1st in Central | 16 | 9 | 7 | .563 | Lost in conference finals |
| Chicago | 2011–12 | 66 | 50 | 16 | .758 | 1st in Central | 6 | 2 | 4 | .333 | Lost in first round |
| Chicago | 2012–13 | 82 | 45 | 37 | .549 | 2nd in Central | 12 | 5 | 7 | .417 | Lost in conference semifinals |
| Chicago | 2013–14 | 82 | 48 | 34 | .585 | 2nd in Central | 5 | 1 | 4 | .200 | Lost in first round |
| Chicago | 2014–15 | 82 | 50 | 32 | .610 | 2nd in Central | 12 | 6 | 6 | .500 | Lost in conference semifinals |
| Minnesota | 2016–17 | 82 | 31 | 51 | .378 | 5th in Northwest | — | — | — | — | Missed playoffs |
| Minnesota | 2017–18 | 82 | 47 | 35 | .573 | 4th in Northwest | 5 | 1 | 4 | .200 | Lost in first round |
| Minnesota | 2018–19 | 40 | 19 | 21 | .475 | (fired) | — | — | — | — | — |
| New York | 2020–21 | 72 | 41 | 31 | .569 | 3rd in Atlantic | 5 | 1 | 4 | .200 | Lost in first round |
| New York | 2021–22 | 82 | 37 | 45 | .451 | 5th in Atlantic | — | — | — | — | Missed playoffs |
| New York | 2022–23 | 82 | 47 | 35 | .573 | 3rd in Atlantic | 11 | 6 | 5 | .545 | Lost in conference semifinals |
| New York | 2023–24 | 82 | 50 | 32 | .610 | 2nd in Atlantic | 13 | 7 | 6 | .538 | Lost in conference semifinals |
| New York | 2024–25 | 82 | 51 | 31 | .622 | 2nd in Atlantic | 18 | 10 | 8 | .556 | Lost in conference finals |
| Career | | 998 | 578 | 420 | .579 | | 103 | 48 | 55 | .466 | |

== Coaching style ==
In his five years as the head coach of the Chicago Bulls, the franchise was 255–139 (.647 winning percentage), and led the league in close-game winning percentage at .623 (66–40).

Thibodeau has been compared to successful NFL coach Bill Belichick because of his attention to detail, organization, and game planning. “[Thibodeau] was meticulously organized, almost scary organized, and he reminded me of Bill Belichick. I’ve spent a lot of time with Belichick and Thibodeau’s got a lot of the same mannerisms, the same attention to detail that Belichick has. And that’s about the highest compliment I could give someone," said Hall of Fame basketball coach Rick Pitino. "[Thibodeau is] very similar to Bill Belichick if you ever to go to a Bill Belichick practice,” said former NBA player Brian Scalabrine. “Every smallest detail of his practice is talked about. Every pass has to be seamed. Every shot has to be quick and balanced. Every pick-and-roll you have to come off shoulder-to-hip,” said Scalabrine.

He has been called "one of the best coaches in the NBA", sometimes ranking among the top five coaches in the league among NBA general managers. He was ranked 13th best coach in 2017 by ESPN, despite the Timberwolves finishing outside of playoff contention.

Highly regarded as a defensive strategist, in January 2013, ESPN praised Thibodeau's defensive system as "the pinnacle of team defensive strategy in the NBA." However, according to a 2010 Boston Globe article, "one of the many misconceptions about Thibodeau is that he’s strictly a defensive specialist." Jeff Van Gundy hired Thibodeau because he was drawn to "his innovative offensive sets" and "player development skills." Furthermore, Thibodeau's offensive sets rely on the triangle offense.

== Player development ==
Thibodeau has been described as a "no-nonsense coach, but his personal authenticity and the success of his strategies endear him to his players." According to Kevin Garnett, who played for Thibodeau in Boston, Thibodeau is "a worker. He's a guy that loves his job. He does it with passion." Thibodeau also helped develop a young Kobe Bryant. "[Thibodeau] was crucial [to my development]. He was with me when I was 16 or 17 years old," Bryant said in 2010. "Just doing drills and just working on ballhandling and just teaching me the game. He was there from Day 1."

In 2005, while an assistant with the Houston Rockets, Thibodeau began working with Yao Ming, traveling to China to hone Yao's skills. According to Jon Barry, a former NBA player who worked as an assistant with the Rockets, "Thibodeau was an effective one-on-one teacher [who spent] countless hours ... working with Yao Ming on his footwork...." Also, former Rockets head coach Jeff Van Gundy praised Thibodeau for his development of Yao. "Tom was tremendous in developing a routine that Yao could follow — a blueprint to take him from being good to being great,” said Van Gundy. During the 2004–05 season, Yao averaged 18.3 points and 8.4 rebounds per game. The following season, after working with Thibodeau, Yao averaged 22.3 points and 10.2 rebounds.

A number of Thibodeau's former players have praised him for his ability to develop their talent. According to Joakim Noah, who played for Thibodeau and finished 4th in MVP voting with the Bulls in 2014, "I feel like I really improved as a player because of him."

Rose, who became the youngest MVP in league history under Thibodeau, also had similar praise for his former coach, telling the Detroit News, “I figured out that Thibs loved me unconditionally. He’s the first coach up here that I felt like loved me unconditionally and it wasn’t about what I did for him."

== Personal life ==
Thibodeau has four siblings (two brothers and two sisters). He holds a Bachelor of Science degree and a Master of Science in counseling from Salem State University. In 1998, he was inducted into the New Britain Sports Hall of Fame.

Thibodeau has never been married. According to a 2012 New York Times profile, Thibodeau was engaged while he was in graduate school at Salem State, but the marriage was called off six weeks before the scheduled wedding. The same article focused on Thibodeau's obsessive focus on basketball as the reason he has never had the time or attention to have much of a personal life, marriage included.
