= 2018–19 NBA season =

73rd NBA season

- League: National Basketball Association
- Sport: Basketball
- Duration: October 16, 2018 – April 10, 2019; April 13 – May 25, 2019 (Playoffs); May 30 – June 13, 2019 (Finals)
- Games: 82
- Teams: 30
- TV partner(s): ABC, TNT, ESPN, NBA TV

Draft
- Top draft pick: Deandre Ayton
- Picked by: Phoenix Suns

Regular season
- Top seed: Milwaukee Bucks
- Season MVP: Giannis Antetokounmpo (Milwaukee)
- Top scorer: James Harden (Houston)

Playoffs
- Eastern champions: Toronto Raptors
- Eastern runners-up: Milwaukee Bucks
- Western champions: Golden State Warriors
- Western runners-up: Portland Trail Blazers

Finals
- Champions: Toronto Raptors
- Runners-up: Golden State Warriors
- Finals MVP: Kawhi Leonard (Toronto)

NBA seasons
- ← 2017–18 2019–20 →

The 2018–19 NBA season was the 73rd season of the National Basketball Association (NBA). The regular season began on October 16, 2018, and ended on April 10, 2019. The 2019 NBA All-Star Game was played on February 17, 2019, at Spectrum Center in Charlotte, North Carolina. The playoffs began on April 13, 2019 and ended on June 13 with the Toronto Raptors defeating the defending NBA champion Golden State Warriors in the 2019 NBA Finals.

== Transactions ==
=== Retirement ===
- On May 10, 2018, Nick Collison announced his retirement from the NBA. Collison played all his 15 seasons with the Seattle SuperSonics/Oklahoma City Thunder franchise.
- On May 25, 2018, after playing 13 seasons in the NBA for seven teams, Mo Williams announced his retirement from the NBA to take the assistant head coaching job at Cal State Northridge.
- On July 17, 2018, after playing 9 seasons in the NBA for four teams, Roy Hibbert announced his retirement from the NBA.
- On August 27, 2018, Manu Ginóbili announced his retirement from the NBA. Ginóbili played all of his 16 NBA seasons with the San Antonio Spurs franchise, winning four championships.
- On August 30, 2018, after playing 15 seasons in the NBA for four teams, David West announced his retirement from the NBA.
- On September 6, 2018, Boris Diaw announced his retirement from basketball. Diaw spent 14 years in the NBA and was an NBA champion with the San Antonio Spurs in 2014.
- On October 13, 2018, after playing 17 seasons in the NBA for eight teams, Richard Jefferson announced his retirement from the NBA.
- On March 23, 2019, after playing 14 seasons in the NBA for five teams, Al Jefferson announced his retirement from the NBA after signing a contract to join Big3.
- On March 26, 2019, after the Miami Heat retired his jersey, Chris Bosh announced his retirement from the NBA. Bosh played for two teams during his 13-year NBA career, and he had not played professionally since February 2016 due to recurring blood clots in his lungs and legs. Bosh won back-to-back NBA championships with the Heat in 2012 and 2013.
- On March 26, 2019, Kris Humphries announced his retirement from the NBA. Humphries played for eight teams during his 13-year NBA career, and he had not played professionally since the 2016–17 season with the Atlanta Hawks.

=== Free agency ===
Free agency negotiations began on July 1. Players began signing on July 6 after the July moratorium ended. LeBron James's four-year, $154 million contract with the Los Angeles Lakers was the biggest free agency news of the offseason after James spent the last four seasons as his second stint with his hometown Cleveland Cavaliers which began in 2014.

=== Coaching changes ===
Coaching changes
Off-season
Team	2017–18 season	2018–19 season
Atlanta Hawks	Mike Budenholzer	Lloyd Pierce
Charlotte Hornets	Steve Clifford	James Borrego
Detroit Pistons	Stan Van Gundy	Dwane Casey
Milwaukee Bucks	Joe Prunty (interim)	Mike Budenholzer
New York Knicks	Jeff Hornacek	David Fizdale
Orlando Magic	Frank Vogel	Steve Clifford
Phoenix Suns	Jay Triano (interim)	Igor Kokoškov
Toronto Raptors	Dwane Casey	Nick Nurse
In-season
Team	Outgoing coach	Incoming coach
Chicago Bulls	Fred Hoiberg	Jim Boylen
Cleveland Cavaliers	Tyronn Lue	Larry Drew
Minnesota Timberwolves	Tom Thibodeau	Ryan Saunders (interim)

==== Off-season ====
- On April 12, 2018, the New York Knicks fired head coach Jeff Hornacek after the team missed the playoffs. In addition, associate head coach Kurt Rambis was fired.
- On April 12, 2018, the Orlando Magic fired head coach Frank Vogel after the team missed the playoffs.
- On April 13, 2018, the Charlotte Hornets fired head coach Steve Clifford after the team missed the playoffs.
- On April 25, 2018, the Atlanta Hawks and Mike Budenholzer had mutually agreed to part ways.
- On May 1, 2018, the Memphis Grizzlies announced that J. B. Bickerstaff would become the new permanent head coach of the team.
- On May 2, 2018, the Phoenix Suns hired Igor Kokoškov as head coach.
- On May 7, 2018, the New York Knicks hired David Fizdale as head coach.
- On May 7, 2018, the Detroit Pistons fired head coach Stan Van Gundy after the team missed the playoffs for the second consecutive season.
- On May 10, 2018, the Charlotte Hornets hired James Borrego as head coach.
- On May 11, 2018, the Toronto Raptors fired Dwane Casey after the team was swept by the Cleveland Cavaliers for the second consecutive time in the postseason.
- On May 11, 2018, the Atlanta Hawks hired Lloyd Pierce as head coach.
- On May 17, 2018, the Milwaukee Bucks hired Mike Budenholzer as head coach.
- On May 30, 2018, the Orlando Magic hired Steve Clifford as head coach.
- On June 11, 2018, the Detroit Pistons hired Dwane Casey as head coach.
- On June 14, 2018, the Toronto Raptors promoted assistant coach Nick Nurse as their head coach.

==== In-season ====
- On October 28, 2018, the Cleveland Cavaliers fired head coach Tyronn Lue after a 0–6 start to the season and named Larry Drew interim head coach. On November 5, Drew was named as Lue's permanent replacement.
- On December 3, 2018, the Chicago Bulls fired head coach Fred Hoiberg after a 5–19 start to the season and named Jim Boylen head coach.
- On January 6, 2019, the Minnesota Timberwolves fired head coach Tom Thibodeau and named assistant coach Ryan Saunders as interim head coach.

== Preseason ==
The preseason began on September 28 and ended on October 12.

=== International games ===
The Toronto Raptors played two preseason games in Canada outside of their home arena: first against the Portland Trail Blazers at the Rogers Arena in Vancouver on September 29, and second with the Brooklyn Nets in Montreal at the Bell Centre on October 10.

The Dallas Mavericks and the Philadelphia 76ers played two preseason games in China, in Shanghai on October 5 and in Shenzhen on October 8.

== Regular season ==
The regular season began on October 16, 2018, and ended on April 10, 2019. The entire schedule was released on August 10, 2018.

Eastern Conference

Atlantic Division	W	L	PCT	GB	Home	Road	Div	GP
y – Toronto Raptors	58	24	.707	–	32‍–‍9	26‍–‍15	12–4	82
x – Philadelphia 76ers	51	31	.622	7.0	31‍–‍10	20‍–‍21	8–8	82
x – Boston Celtics	49	33	.598	9.0	28‍–‍13	21‍–‍20	10–6	82
x – Brooklyn Nets	42	40	.512	16.0	23‍–‍18	19‍–‍22	8–8	82
New York Knicks	17	65	.207	41.0	9‍–‍32	8‍–‍33	2–14	82

Central Division	W	L	PCT	GB	Home	Road	Div	GP
z – Milwaukee Bucks	60	22	.732	–	33‍–‍8	27‍–‍14	14–2	82
x – Indiana Pacers	48	34	.585	12.0	29‍–‍12	19‍–‍22	11–5	82
x – Detroit Pistons	41	41	.500	19.0	26‍–‍15	15‍–‍26	8–8	82
Chicago Bulls	22	60	.268	38.0	9‍–‍32	13‍–‍28	3–13	82
Cleveland Cavaliers	19	63	.232	41.0	13‍–‍28	6‍–‍35	4–12	82

Southeast Division	W	L	PCT	GB	Home	Road	Div	GP
y – Orlando Magic	42	40	.512	–	25‍–‍16	17‍–‍24	10–6	82
Charlotte Hornets	39	43	.476	3.0	25‍–‍16	14‍–‍27	10–6	82
Miami Heat	39	43	.476	3.0	19‍–‍22	20‍–‍21	7–9	82
Washington Wizards	32	50	.390	10.0	22‍–‍19	10‍–‍31	7–9	82
Atlanta Hawks	29	53	.354	13.0	17‍–‍24	12‍–‍29	6–10	82

Western Conference

Northwest Division	W	L	PCT	GB	Home	Road	Div	GP
y – Denver Nuggets	54	28	.659	–	34‍–‍7	20‍–‍21	12–4	82
x – Portland Trail Blazers	53	29	.646	1.0	32‍–‍9	21‍–‍20	6–10	82
x – Utah Jazz	50	32	.610	4.0	29‍–‍12	21‍–‍20	8–8	82
x – Oklahoma City Thunder	49	33	.598	5.0	27‍–‍14	22‍–‍19	9–7	82
Minnesota Timberwolves	36	46	.439	18.0	25‍–‍16	11‍–‍30	5–11	82

Pacific Division	W	L	PCT	GB	Home	Road	Div	GP
c – Golden State Warriors	57	25	.695	–	30‍–‍11	27‍–‍14	13–3	82
x – Los Angeles Clippers	48	34	.585	9.0	26‍–‍15	22‍–‍19	11–5	82
Sacramento Kings	39	43	.476	18.0	24‍–‍17	15‍–‍26	4–12	82
Los Angeles Lakers	37	45	.451	20.0	22‍–‍19	15‍–‍26	9–7	82
Phoenix Suns	19	63	.232	38.0	12‍–‍29	7‍–‍34	3–13	82

Southwest Division	W	L	PCT	GB	Home	Road	Div	GP
y – Houston Rockets	53	29	.646	–	31‍–‍10	22‍–‍19	10–6	82
x – San Antonio Spurs	48	34	.585	5.0	32‍–‍9	16‍–‍25	10–6	82
Memphis Grizzlies	33	49	.402	20.0	21‍–‍20	12‍–‍29	8–8	82
New Orleans Pelicans	33	49	.402	20.0	19‍–‍22	14‍–‍27	8–8	82
Dallas Mavericks	33	49	.402	20.0	24‍–‍17	9‍–‍32	4–12	82

=== By conference ===
Eastern Conference
#	Team	W	L	PCT	GB	GP
1	z – Milwaukee Bucks *	60	22	.732	–	82
2	y – Toronto Raptors *	58	24	.707	2.0	82
3	x – Philadelphia 76ers	51	31	.622	9.0	82
4	x – Boston Celtics	49	33	.598	11.0	82
5	x – Indiana Pacers	48	34	.585	12.0	82
6	x – Brooklyn Nets	42	40	.512	18.0	82
7	y – Orlando Magic *	42	40	.512	18.0	82
8	x – Detroit Pistons	41	41	.500	19.0	82
9	Charlotte Hornets	39	43	.476	21.0	82
10	Miami Heat	39	43	.476	21.0	82
11	Washington Wizards	32	50	.390	28.0	82
12	Atlanta Hawks	29	53	.354	31.0	82
13	Chicago Bulls	22	60	.268	38.0	82
14	Cleveland Cavaliers	19	63	.232	41.0	82
15	New York Knicks	17	65	.207	43.0	82

Western Conference
#	Team	W	L	PCT	GB	GP
1	c – Golden State Warriors *	57	25	.695	–	82
2	y – Denver Nuggets *	54	28	.659	3.0	82
3	x – Portland Trail Blazers	53	29	.646	4.0	82
4	y – Houston Rockets *	53	29	.646	4.0	82
5	x – Utah Jazz	50	32	.610	7.0	82
6	x – Oklahoma City Thunder	49	33	.598	8.0	82
7	x – San Antonio Spurs	48	34	.585	9.0	82
8	x – Los Angeles Clippers	48	34	.585	9.0	82
9	Sacramento Kings	39	43	.476	18.0	82
10	Los Angeles Lakers	37	45	.451	20.0	82
11	Minnesota Timberwolves	36	46	.439	21.0	82
12	Memphis Grizzlies	33	49	.402	24.0	82
13	New Orleans Pelicans	33	49	.402	24.0	82
14	Dallas Mavericks	33	49	.402	24.0	82
15	Phoenix Suns	19	63	.232	38.0	82

Notes

- z – Clinched home court advantage for the entire playoffs
- c – Clinched home court advantage for the conference playoffs
- y – Clinched division title
- x – Clinched playoff spot
- * – Division leader

=== International games ===
On June 20, 2018, the NBA announced that the Washington Wizards would play the New York Knicks at the O2 Arena in London, United Kingdom on January 17, 2019.

On August 7, 2018, the NBA announced that the Orlando Magic would play two games at Mexico City Arena in Mexico City. They played against the Chicago Bulls on December 13, 2018, and they played against the Utah Jazz on December 15, 2018.

== Playoffs ==
The 2019 NBA playoffs began on April 13 and ended with the NBA Finals, which began on May 30 and ended on June 13.

=== Bracket ===
First round	Second round
E1	Milwaukee*	4
E8	Detroit	0
E1	Milwaukee*	4
E4	Boston	1
E4	Boston	4
E5	Indiana	0
Eastern Conference
E3	Philadelphia	4
E6	Brooklyn	1
E3	Philadelphia	3
E2	Toronto*	4
E2	Toronto*	4
E7	Orlando*	1
W1	Golden State*	4
W8	LA Clippers	2
W1	Golden State*	4
W4	Houston*	2
W4	Houston*	4
W5	Utah	1
Western Conference
W3	Portland	4
W6	Oklahoma City	1
W3	Portland	4
W2	Denver*	3
W2	Denver*	4
W7	San Antonio	3

Conference finals
E1	Milwaukee*	2
E2	Toronto*	4
W1	Golden State*	4
W3	Portland	0

NBA Finals
E2	Toronto*	4
W1	Golden State*	2

- * Division winner
- Bold Series winner
- Italic Team with home-court advantage

== Statistics ==
=== Individual statistic leaders ===
Category	Player	Team	Statistic
Points per game	James Harden	Houston Rockets	36.1
Rebounds per game	Andre Drummond	Detroit Pistons	15.6
Assists per game	Russell Westbrook	Oklahoma City Thunder	10.7
Steals per game	Paul George	Oklahoma City Thunder	2.21
Blocks per game	Myles Turner	Indiana Pacers	2.69
Turnovers per game	James Harden	Houston Rockets	5.0
Fouls per game	Jaren Jackson Jr.	Memphis Grizzlies	3.8
Fouls per game	Karl-Anthony Towns	Minnesota Timberwolves	3.8
Minutes per game	Bradley Beal	Washington Wizards	36.9
Minutes per game	Paul George	Oklahoma City Thunder	36.9
FG%	Rudy Gobert	Utah Jazz	66.9%
FT%	Malcolm Brogdon	Milwaukee Bucks	92.8%
3FG%	Joe Harris	Brooklyn Nets	47.4%
Efficiency per game	Giannis Antetokounmpo	Milwaukee Bucks	30.9
Double-doubles	Andre Drummond	Detroit Pistons	69
Triple-doubles	Russell Westbrook	Oklahoma City Thunder	34

=== Individual game highs ===
Category	Player	Team	Statistic
Points	James Harden	Houston Rockets	61
Rebounds	Karl-Anthony Towns	Minnesota Timberwolves	27
Assists	Russell Westbrook	Oklahoma City Thunder	24
Steals	Kyrie Irving	Boston Celtics	8
Blocks	Hassan Whiteside	Miami Heat	9
Blocks	Mitchell Robinson	New York Knicks	9
Three-pointers	Klay Thompson	Golden State Warriors	14

=== Team statistic leaders ===
Category	Team	Statistic
Points per game	Milwaukee Bucks	118.1
Rebounds per game	Milwaukee Bucks	49.7
Assists per game	Golden State Warriors	29.4
Steals per game	Oklahoma City Thunder	9.3
Blocks per game	Golden State Warriors	6.4
Turnovers per game	Atlanta Hawks	16.6
FG%	Golden State Warriors	49.1%
FT%	San Antonio Spurs	81.9%
3FG%	San Antonio Spurs	39.2%
+/−	Milwaukee Bucks	+8.8

== Awards ==
=== Yearly awards ===
Awards was presented at the NBA Awards ceremony, which was held on June 24. Finalists for voted awards were announced during the playoffs and winners were presented at the award ceremony. The All-NBA Teams was announced in advance in order for teams to have all the necessary information to make off-season preparations.

2018–19 NBA awards
Award	Recipient(s)	Finalists
Most Valuable Player	Giannis Antetokounmpo (Milwaukee Bucks)	Paul George (Oklahoma City Thunder); James Harden (Houston Rockets)
Defensive Player of the Year	Rudy Gobert (Utah Jazz)	Giannis Antetokounmpo (Milwaukee Bucks); Paul George (Oklahoma City Thunder)
Rookie of the Year	Luka Dončić (Dallas Mavericks)	Deandre Ayton (Phoenix Suns); Trae Young (Atlanta Hawks)
Sixth Man of the Year	Lou Williams (Los Angeles Clippers)	Montrezl Harrell (Los Angeles Clippers); Domantas Sabonis (Indiana Pacers)
Most Improved Player	Pascal Siakam (Toronto Raptors)	De'Aaron Fox (Sacramento Kings); D'Angelo Russell (Brooklyn Nets)
Coach of the Year	Mike Budenholzer (Milwaukee Bucks)	Michael Malone (Denver Nuggets); Doc Rivers (Los Angeles Clippers)
Executive of the Year	Jon Horst (Milwaukee Bucks)	
NBA Sportsmanship Award	Mike Conley Jr. (Memphis Grizzlies)	
J. Walter Kennedy Citizenship Award	Damian Lillard (Portland Trail Blazers)	
Twyman–Stokes Teammate of the Year Award	Mike Conley Jr. (Memphis Grizzlies)	
Community Assist Award	Bradley Beal (Washington Wizards)	

- All-NBA First Team:
  - F Giannis Antetokounmpo, Milwaukee Bucks
  - F Paul George, Oklahoma City Thunder
  - C Nikola Jokić, Denver Nuggets
  - G Stephen Curry, Golden State Warriors
  - G James Harden, Houston Rockets
- All-NBA Second Team:
  - F Kevin Durant, Golden State Warriors
  - F Kawhi Leonard, Toronto Raptors
  - C Joel Embiid, Philadelphia 76ers
  - G Damian Lillard, Portland Trail Blazers
  - G Kyrie Irving, Boston Celtics
- All-NBA Third Team:
  - F LeBron James, Los Angeles Lakers
  - F Blake Griffin, Detroit Pistons
  - C Rudy Gobert, Utah Jazz
  - G Kemba Walker, Charlotte Hornets
  - G Russell Westbrook, Oklahoma City Thunder

- NBA All-Defensive First Team:
  - F Giannis Antetokounmpo, Milwaukee Bucks
  - F Paul George, Oklahoma City Thunder
  - C Rudy Gobert, Utah Jazz
  - G Eric Bledsoe, Milwaukee Bucks
  - G Marcus Smart, Boston Celtics
- NBA All-Defensive Second Team:
  - F Draymond Green, Golden State Warriors
  - F Kawhi Leonard, Toronto Raptors
  - C Joel Embiid, Philadelphia 76ers
  - G Klay Thompson, Golden State Warriors
  - G Jrue Holiday, New Orleans Pelicans

- NBA All-Rookie First Team:
  - Deandre Ayton, Phoenix Suns
  - Marvin Bagley III, Sacramento Kings
  - Luka Dončić, Dallas Mavericks
  - Jaren Jackson Jr., Memphis Grizzlies
  - Trae Young, Atlanta Hawks
- NBA All-Rookie Second Team:
  - Shai Gilgeous-Alexander, Los Angeles Clippers
  - Collin Sexton, Cleveland Cavaliers
  - Landry Shamet, Los Angeles Clippers
  - Mitchell Robinson, New York Knicks
  - Kevin Huerter, Atlanta Hawks

=== Players of the Week ===
The following players were named the Eastern and Western Conference Players of the Week.

Week	Eastern Conference	Western Conference	Ref
October 16–21	Kemba Walker (Charlotte Hornets) (1/2)	Nikola Jokić (Denver Nuggets) (1/3)	
October 22–28	Giannis Antetokounmpo (Milwaukee Bucks) (1/6)	Stephen Curry (Golden State Warriors) (1/2)	
October 29 – November 4	Victor Oladipo (Indiana Pacers) (1/1)	Russell Westbrook (Oklahoma City Thunder) (1/2)	
November 5–11	Pascal Siakam (Toronto Raptors) (1/1)	CJ McCollum (Portland Trail Blazers) (1/1)	
November 12–18	Nikola Vučević (Orlando Magic) (1/1)	Anthony Davis (New Orleans Pelicans) (1/1)	
November 19–25	Giannis Antetokounmpo (Milwaukee Bucks) (2/6)	Tobias Harris (Los Angeles Clippers) (1/1)	
November 26 – December 2	Kawhi Leonard (Toronto Raptors) (1/2)	Paul Millsap (Denver Nuggets) (1/1)	
December 3–9	Bradley Beal (Washington Wizards) (1/2)	Stephen Curry (Golden State Warriors) (2/2)	
December 10–16	Thaddeus Young (Indiana Pacers) (1/1)	James Harden (Houston Rockets) (1/4)	
December 17–23	Giannis Antetokounmpo (Milwaukee Bucks) (3/6)	Paul George (Oklahoma City Thunder) (1/3)	
December 24–30	Giannis Antetokounmpo (Milwaukee Bucks) (4/6)	James Harden (Houston Rockets) (2/4)	
December 31 – January 6	Joel Embiid (Philadelphia 76ers) (1/1)	Nikola Jokić (Denver Nuggets) (2/3)	
January 7–13	Kawhi Leonard (Toronto Raptors) (2/2)	Donovan Mitchell (Utah Jazz) (1/2)	
January 14–20	D'Angelo Russell (Brooklyn Nets) (1/1)	James Harden (Houston Rockets) (3/4)	
January 21–27	Giannis Antetokounmpo (Milwaukee Bucks) (5/6)	Paul George (Oklahoma City Thunder) (2/3)	
January 28 – February 3	Giannis Antetokounmpo (Milwaukee Bucks) (6/6)	Nikola Jokić (Denver Nuggets) (3/3)	
February 4–10	Bojan Bogdanović (Indiana Pacers) (1/1)	Paul George (Oklahoma City Thunder) (3/3)	
February 25 – March 3	Ben Simmons (Philadelphia 76ers) (1/1)	Donovan Mitchell (Utah Jazz) (2/2)	
March 4–10	Andre Drummond (Detroit Pistons) (1/2)	Mike Conley Jr. (Memphis Grizzlies) (1/1)	
March 11–17	Bradley Beal (Washington Wizards) (2/2)	Rudy Gobert (Utah Jazz) (1/1)	
March 18–24	Trae Young (Atlanta Hawks) (1/1)	James Harden (Houston Rockets) (4/4)	
March 25–31	Andre Drummond (Detroit Pistons) (2/2)	Damian Lillard (Portland Trail Blazers) (1/1)	
April 1–7	Kemba Walker (Charlotte Hornets) (2/2)	Russell Westbrook (Oklahoma City Thunder) (2/2)	

=== Players of the Month ===
The following players were named the Eastern and Western Conference Players of the Month.

Month	Eastern Conference	Western Conference	Ref
October/November	Giannis Antetokounmpo (Milwaukee Bucks) (1/4)	Tobias Harris (Los Angeles Clippers) (1/1)	
December	Giannis Antetokounmpo (Milwaukee Bucks) (2/4)	James Harden (Houston Rockets) (1/3)	
January	Joel Embiid (Philadelphia 76ers) (1/1)	James Harden (Houston Rockets) (2/3)	
February	Giannis Antetokounmpo (Milwaukee Bucks) (3/4)	Paul George (Oklahoma City Thunder) (1/1)	
March/April	Giannis Antetokounmpo (Milwaukee Bucks) (4/4)	James Harden (Houston Rockets) (3/3)	

=== Rookies of the Month ===
The following players were named the Eastern and Western Conference Rookies of the Month.

Month	Eastern Conference	Western Conference	Ref
October/November	Trae Young (Atlanta Hawks) (1/4)	Luka Dončić (Dallas Mavericks) (1/5)	
December	Kevin Knox II (New York Knicks) (1/1)	Luka Dončić (Dallas Mavericks) (2/5)	
January	Trae Young (Atlanta Hawks) (2/4)	Luka Dončić (Dallas Mavericks) (3/5)	
February	Trae Young (Atlanta Hawks) (3/4)	Luka Dončić (Dallas Mavericks) (4/5)	
March/April	Trae Young (Atlanta Hawks) (4/4)	Luka Dončić (Dallas Mavericks) (5/5)	

=== Coaches of the Month ===
The following coaches were named the Eastern and Western Conference Coaches of the Month.

Month	Eastern Conference	Western Conference	Ref
October/November	Nick Nurse (Toronto Raptors) (1/1)	Doc Rivers (Los Angeles Clippers) (1/1)	
December	Nate McMillan (Indiana Pacers) (1/1)	Mike D'Antoni (Houston Rockets) (1/1)	
January	Mike Budenholzer (Milwaukee Bucks) (1/2)	Steve Kerr (Golden State Warriors) (1/1)	
February	Mike Budenholzer (Milwaukee Bucks) (2/2)	Terry Stotts (Portland Trail Blazers) (1/2)	
March/April	Steve Clifford (Orlando Magic) (1/1)	Terry Stotts (Portland Trail Blazers) (2/2)	

== Arenas ==
- The Atlanta Hawks' home arena, formerly known as Philips Arena, was renamed State Farm Arena on August 29, 2018, coinciding with a $192.5 million renovation to the arena.
- This was the Golden State Warriors' final season at Oracle Arena in Oakland before moving to the new Chase Center in San Francisco. The Warriors played their final regular-season game there on April 7, 2019, against the Los Angeles Clippers, the final playoff game at Oracle Arena was game 6 of the NBA Finals on June 13, 2019, in which the Warriors lost to the Toronto Raptors.
- This was the Milwaukee Bucks' first season at the new Fiserv Forum after playing at the Bradley Center from 1988 to 2018. The Bucks played their first game there on October 3, 2018, in a preseason game against the Chicago Bulls; the first regular-season game there was played on October 19, 2018, against the Indiana Pacers.
- The Toronto Raptors' home arena, formerly known as Air Canada Centre, was renamed Scotiabank Arena on July 1, 2018.

== Media ==
This was the third year of a nine-year deal with ABC, ESPN, TNT and NBA TV.

== Notable occurrences ==
- On September 21, 2018, the NBA approved three rule changes affecting gameplay, starting with this season onward. These changes include shortening the game clock from the typical 24 seconds to 14 seconds during offensive rebounds, simplifying the clear path foul rule, and expanding the definition of a "hostile act" to invoke instant replays on certain events more easily.
- On October 29, 2018, Klay Thompson of the Golden State Warriors set three NBA records. He set the record for most three-pointers made in a game by making 14 (out of 24) against the Chicago Bulls, surpassing the former record of 13 held by his teammate Stephen Curry. He also set the record for most three-pointers attempted in a game at 24, as well as tied Chandler Parsons' record of most three-pointers made in a half with 10.
- On November 21, 2018, Vince Carter of the Atlanta Hawks became the 22nd player in NBA history to record at least 25,000 points.
- On November 23, 2018, Brook Lopez of the Milwaukee Bucks set the record for most three-pointers attempted in a game without making one, with 12 attempts.
- On November 25, 2018, Jamal Crawford of the Phoenix Suns moved to 26th all-time in NBA regular-season games played, passing A.C. Green's total of 1,278 games in 16 seasons.
- On November 28, 2018, Vince Carter moved to seventh all-time in NBA regular-season games played. He passed Kevin Willis, who played a total of 1,424 games in 21 seasons.
- On December 5, 2018, Russell Westbrook of the Oklahoma City Thunder passed Jason Kidd for third place on the all-time career triple-double list by notching his 108th with 21 points, 15 rebounds and 17 assists.
- On December 11, 2018, San Antonio Spurs coach Gregg Popovich passed Pat Riley for fourth place on the NBA all-time coaching wins list by recording his 1,211th win.
- On December 13, 2018, Dirk Nowitzki of the Dallas Mavericks made his season debut, marking his 21st season in the league. This gave him sole possession of the record for most seasons played with one team, surpassing Kobe Bryant's 20. He also tied Robert Parish, Kevin Willis, Kevin Garnett and fellow 1998 NBA draftee and former teammate Vince Carter for the record of most seasons played in the NBA.
- On December 15, 2018, Russell Westbrook passed Kobe Bryant and moved to 30th place on the NBA all-time assists list.
- On December 15, 2018, LeBron James and Lonzo Ball of the Los Angeles Lakers both recorded triple-doubles. It was the first time that teammates had recorded triple-doubles in the same game since 2007, when Jason Kidd and Vince Carter of the New Jersey Nets did so. The last time a Lakers duo recorded it was 1982 by Magic Johnson and Kareem Abdul-Jabbar.
- On December 18, 2018, Vince Carter passed Paul Pierce on the NBA career three-pointers list with 1,145 threes made.
- On December 19, 2018, the Houston Rockets set the record for the most three-point field goals made in a game with 26, breaking the previous record of 25 set by the Cleveland Cavaliers on March 3, 2017.
- On December 29, 2018, Vince Carter became the oldest player in NBA history to score 20-plus points at 41 years and 337 days old, as he scored 21 points for the Atlanta Hawks in a win against the Cleveland Cavaliers. He broke the old record held by Kareem Abdul-Jabbar at 41 years and 331 days old.
- On January 1, 2019, Jusuf Nurkić of the Portland Trail Blazers became the first player in NBA history to record a 20–20 on a five-on-five (20-plus in any two statistical categories and at least five on the remaining three statistical categories). He recorded 24 points, 23 rebounds, 7 assists, 5 steals and 5 blocks in a 113–108 overtime win over the Sacramento Kings.
- On January 5, 2019, Stephen Curry of the Golden State Warriors passed Kyle Korver on the all-time three-point field goals made list and moved to fourth place. In the same game, the Golden State Warriors (21) and the Sacramento Kings (20) recorded the most three-pointers made in a game by both teams combined at 41. They broke the record set by the Minnesota Timberwolves (19) and the Cleveland Cavaliers (21) on February 7, 2018.
- On January 10, 2019, coach Gregg Popovich of the San Antonio Spurs became the third coach with most wins in NBA history after posting a win in double overtime against the Oklahoma City Thunder, 154–147. He passed Jerry Sloan with his 1,222nd win.
- On January 11, 2019, Stephen Curry moved past Jason Terry for third place on the list of NBA all-time three-pointers made.
- On January 12, 2019, Kyle Korver of the Utah Jazz, passed Jason Terry to move to fourth place on the NBA all-time three-point field goals made list.
- On January 13, 2019, James Harden (1-of-17) of the Houston Rockets tied Damon Stoudamire's (5-of-21) NBA record for most three-point field goals missed in a game with 16.
- On January 16, 2019, the Golden State Warriors (24) and the New Orleans Pelicans (19) recorded the most three-point field goals made in a game by both teams combined at 43. They broke the record the Warriors (21) and the Sacramento Kings (20) just set 11 days prior with 41.
- On January 21, 2019, Klay Thompson tied the record for most consecutive three-point field goals made in a game at 10.
- On February 7, 2019, Vince Carter passed Jerry West for 21st on the NBA's all-time scoring list.
- On February 11, 2019, Russell Westbrook set an NBA record of recording ten straight games with a triple-double which broke Wilt Chamberlain's old record of nine.
- On February 21, 2019, James Harden recorded his 32nd consecutive game of scoring 30-plus points which makes it the second-longest 30-plus-points streak in NBA history. The streak started on December 23, 2018, and ended on February 25, 2019.
- On February 28, 2019, Chris Paul of the Houston Rockets moved to 10th place on the NBA's all-time steals leaders which was previously held by Karl Malone.
- On March 5, 2019, Vince Carter passed Reggie Miller for 20th place on the NBA's all-time scoring list, passed Jamal Crawford for sixth place on the NBA's all-time three-point field goals made leaders, became the oldest player to shoot seven three-pointers and broke his own record of being the oldest player to score 20-plus points in a game at 42 years and 37 days old.
- On March 7, 2019, LeBron James moved past Michael Jordan for fourth place on the NBA's all-time scoring list.
- On March 8, 2019, Dirk Nowitzki moved to the third spot in the NBA all-time games played.
- On March 8, 2019, Lou Williams of the Los Angeles Clippers set an NBA record for scoring at least 30 points in a game as a reserve when he scored 40 points against the Oklahoma City Thunder. This marked the 28th time for Williams which surpassed Ricky Pierce's record at 27. He also moved to second place in career points off the bench and passed Jamal Crawford.
- On March 10, 2019, Chris Paul moved past Isiah Thomas for seventh place on the NBA's all-time assist leaders.
- On March 11, 2019, Lou Williams became the NBA's career leader in points off the bench (11,154) with 34 points in a 140–115 win over the Boston Celtics, surpassing Dell Curry (11,147).
- On March 18, 2019, Dirk Nowitzki passed Wilt Chamberlain for sixth place on the NBA's all-time scoring list.
- On March 19, 2019, James Harden became the first player in NBA history to score 30 or more points against all 29 other teams in a single season.
- On March 31, 2019, Vince Carter moved in to the top 5 in career NBA games played.
- On April 2, 2019, Russell Westbrook became the second player in history after Wilt Chamberlain to register a 20–20–20 game, scoring 20 points, 21 assists and 20 rebounds in a 119–103 win against the Los Angeles Lakers.
- On April 9, 2019, Jamal Crawford scored 51 points off the bench vs the Dallas Mavericks, the most bench points in a game in NBA history.

== See also ==
- List of NBA regular season records
