= Jeff Weltman =

American Basketball executive

Orlando Magic
- Position: President of Basketball Operations
- League: NBA

Personal information
- Born: New York City, New York, U.S.

Career information
- College: Oberlin College

Jeff Weltman is an American basketball executive who is the president of basketball operations for the Orlando Magic of the National Basketball Association (NBA).

In 2020, Weltman received one 1st place vote for NBA Executive of the Year.

== Early life and career ==
Weltman grew up in New York. He was raised by his father, Harry Weltman, and his mother, Arlene. Harry Weltman was a former GM for the now defunct ABA's Spirits of St. Louis in the mid-1970s and for the Cleveland Cavaliers and New Jersey Nets in the mid-1980s. As a teenager, Weltman played pick-up basketball in the South Bronx and Harlem on Saturdays. Weltman played basketball at Oberlin College in Ohio.

At the start of Weltman's career, he was hired by the Clippers as a video coordinator in the late 1990s. Weltman then served as the director of player personnel with the Los Angeles Clippers, director of basketball administration with the Detroit Pistons, assistant GM with the Denver Nuggets and Milwaukee Bucks and EVP of basketball operations and GM with the Toronto Raptors. Before Weltman joined the Raptors, the Raptors were on a five-year playoff-drought. During Weltman's four-year tenure with the Raptors, the team qualified for the postseason every season and won three playoff series. He then was offered the job of President of Basketball Operations for the Orlando Magic. He took the position and moved to Orlando with his wife, Alexis, and his twin daughters, JJ and Lucy.

== Orlando Magic ==
On April 13, 2017, the Magic fired GM Rob Hennigan and assistant GM Scott Perry following a five-year run of not making the playoffs. In the seasons leading up to these events, the organization did not have luck in the NBA draft lottery and decided to make more short-sighted trades with the hope to overcome their postseason losing streak.

On May 22, 2017, the Orlando Magic hired Weltman as their new president of basketball operations, and they announced they would give up their less desirable 2018 second-round NBA draft pick to the Raptors as compensation. Around this time, the Orlando Magic had promising young talent with Aaron Gordon, Elfrid Payton and Nikola Vucevic. In the 2017 NBA draft, the Magic selected Jonathan Isaac with the 6th pick.

In May 2018, Orlando added new coach Steve Clifford on a four-year deal. Weltman said "Steve is widely regarded throughout the NBA community as an elite coach and developer of players at all stages. His teams have always been disciplined and prepared and have embraced the concept of playing for each other.” In the 2018 NBA draft, the Magic selected Mohamed Bamba with the 6th pick, and Melvin Frazier with the 35th pick.

Following the 2018–19 Orlando Magic season, Weltman re-signed Nikola Vucevic, Terrence Ross and Michael Carter-Williams and acquired Al-Farouq Aminu. In the 2019 NBA draft, the Magic selected Chuma Okeke with the 16th pick. In the 2020 NBA draft, the Magic selected Cole Anthony with the 15th pick.

In 2021, Weltman said the group was confident that Markelle Fultz and Jonathan Isaac would fully recover from their injuries but that the current situation was a "toxic brew". Under Weltman's leadership, the Magic moved Nikola Vucevic, Evan Fournier, and Aaron Gordon (who requested a trade) in three separate deals at the 2021 trade deadline, acquiring three future first-round picks, Gary Harris, an expiring contract in Otto Porter, as well as Wendell Carter and R. J. Hampton. With the absence of those veteran players, young talent such as Mohamed Bamba, Chuma Okeke and Dwayne Bacon would be given more minutes to showcase their skills.

Weltman said "Anytime you trade a player like Nikola Vucevic, it is a tough decision to make...Vooch' will go down as one of the best players to ever wear a Magic uniform".

== See also ==
- List of National Basketball Association team presidents
