= Orlando Magic draft history =

National Basketball Association team draft history

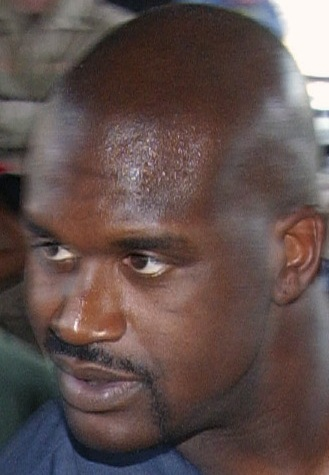
Shaquille O'Neal was drafted by the Orlando Magic in 1992.

The Orlando Magic first participated in the National Basketball Association (NBA) Draft on June 27, 1989, about five months before their inaugural NBA season. The NBA agreed with the National Basketball Players' Association to limit drafts to two rounds from 1989 onward. Before each draft, an NBA draft lottery determines the first round selection order for the teams that missed the playoffs during the prior season. Teams can also trade their picks, so some years a team could have more than or less than two picks.

The Magic were given their two picks in 1989. They selected Nick Anderson with the eleventh overall pick and Michael Ansley with the 37th pick. In 1992, the Magic won the NBA Lottery and with the first pick, they drafted Shaquille O'Neal, who went on to be selected as an All-Star a record-tying 14 consecutive times. In 2004, the Magic drafted a future All-Star, Dwight Howard. Throughout the years, the Magic had traded away some of their picks as well as traded for other teams' picks. As a result of the various trades, the Orlando Magic had three first round picks in 1998 and 2000.

== Key ==
| Abbreviation | Meaning |
| G | Guard |
| PG | Point guard |
| SG | Shooting guard |
| F | Forward |
| SF | Small forward |
| PF | Power forward |
| C | Center |

| Naismith Basketball Hall of Famer | First overall NBA draft pick | Selected for an NBA All-Star Game |

== Selections ==
| Year | Round | Pick | Player | Nationality | Position | College/High School/Club | Notes |
|---|---|---|---|---|---|---|---|
| 1989 | 1 | 11 | Nick Anderson | USA | SG/SF | Illinois | |
| 1989 | 2 | 37 | Michael Ansley | USA | SF | Alabama | |
| 1990 | 1 | 4 | Dennis Scott | USA | SF | Georgia Tech | |
| 1991 | 1 | 10 | Brian Williams | USA | C | Arizona | |
| 1991 | 1 | 23 | Stanley Roberts | USA | C | LSU | (from San Antonio) |
| 1991 | 2 | 36 | Chris Corchiani | USA | PG | North Carolina State | |
| 1992 | 1 | 1 | Shaquille O'Neal | USA | C | LSU | |
| 1993 | 1 | 1 | Chris Webber | USA | PF | Michigan | (traded to Golden State) |
| 1993 | 1 | 26 | Geert Hammink | NED | C | LSU | (from New York) |
| 1994 | 1 | 27 | Brooks Thompson | USA | SG | Oklahoma State | (from L.A. Clippers) |
| 1994 | 2 | 31 | Rodney Dent | USA | C | Kentucky | |
| 1995 | 1 | 25 | David Vaughn | USA | PF/C | Memphis | |
| 1996 | 1 | 27 | Brian Evans | USA | SF | Indiana | |
| 1996 | 2 | 49 | Amal McCaskill | USA | PF/C | Marquette | |
| 1997 | 1 | 17 | Johnny Taylor | USA | SF | Chattanooga | |
| 1997 | 2 | 47 | Eric Washington | USA | SG/SF | Alabama | (traded to Denver) |
| 1998 | 1 | 12 | Michael Doleac | USA | PF/C | Utah | |
| 1998 | 1 | 13 | Keon Clark | USA | PF | UNLV | (from Golden State, traded to Denver) |
| 1998 | 1 | 15 | Matt Harpring | USA | SF | Georgia Tech | (from New Jersey) |
| 1998 | 2 | 42 | Miles Simon | USA | SG | Arizona | |
| 1999 | 2 | 38 | Laron Profit | USA | SG/SF | Maryland | (from Golden State, traded to Washington) |
| 2000 | 1 | 5 | Mike Miller | USA | SG/SF | Florida | (from Golden State) |
| 2000 | 1 | 10 | Keyon Dooling | USA | PG | Missouri | (from Denver) |
| 2000 | 1 | 13 | Courtney Alexander | USA | SG | Fresno State | |
| 2001 | 1 | 15 | Steven Hunter | USA | C | DePaul | |
| 2001 | 1 | 22 | Jeryl Sasser | USA | PG/SG | SMU | (from Houston) |
| 2001 | 2 | 32 | Omar Cook | USA | PG | St. John's | (from Washington, traded to Denver) |
| 2002 | 1 | 18 | Curtis Borchardt | USA | C | Stanford | (traded to Utah) |
| 2003 | 1 | 15 | Reece Gaines | USA | PG | Louisville | |
| 2003 | 2 | 42 | Zaza Pachulia | GEO | PF/C | Ülkerspor (Turkey) | |
| 2004 | 1 | 1 | Dwight Howard | USA | C | Southwest Atlanta Christian Academy (Atlanta) | |
| 2004 | 2 | 30 | Anderson Varejão | BRA | PF | FC Barcelona (Spain) | (traded to Cleveland) |
| 2004 | 2 | 36 | Antonio Burks | USA | PG | Memphis | |
| 2005 | 1 | 11 | Fran Vázquez | ESP | PF | Unicaja Málaga (Spain) | |
| 2005 | 2 | 38 | Travis Diener | USA | PG/SG | Marquette | |
| 2005 | 2 | 44 | Martynas Andriuškevičius | LTU | C | Žalgiris (Lithuania) | (from Cleveland, traded to Cleveland) |
| 2006 | 1 | 11 | JJ Redick | USA | SG | Duke | |
| 2006 | 2 | 41 | James Augustine | USA | PF | Illinois | |
| 2006 | 2 | 44 | Lior Eliyahu | ISR | SF | Hapoel Galil Elyon (Israel) | (from Cleveland, traded to Houston) |
| 2007 | 2 | 44 | Reyshawn Terry | USA | SF | North Carolina | (traded to Dallas) |
| 2008 | 1 | 22 | Courtney Lee | USA | SG | Western Kentucky | |
| 2010 | 1 | 29 | Daniel Orton | USA | C | Kentucky | |
| 2010 | 2 | 59 | Stanley Robinson | USA | SF | Connecticut | |
| 2011 | 2 | 53 | DeAndre Liggins | USA | SG | Kentucky | |
| 2012 | 1 | 19 | Andrew Nicholson | CAN | PF | St. Bonaventure | |
| 2012 | 2 | 49 | Kyle O'Quinn | USA | C | Norfolk St. | |
| 2013 | 1 | 2 | Victor Oladipo | USA | SG | Indiana | |
| 2013 | 2 | 51 | Romero Osby | USA | PF | Oklahoma | |
| 2014 | 1 | 4 | Aaron Gordon | USA | PF | Arizona | |
| 2014 | 1 | 12 | Dario Šarić | CRO | PF/SF | Cibona Zagreb (Croatia) | (from New York via Denver, traded to Philadelphia) |
| 2015 | 1 | 5 | Mario Hezonja | CRO | SG/SF | FC Barcelona (Spain) | |
| 2015 | 2 | 51 | Tyler Harvey | USA | PG | Eastern Washington | (from Chicago) |
| 2016 | 1 | 11 | Domantas Sabonis | LTU | PF/C | Gonzaga | (traded to Oklahoma City) |
| 2016 | 2 | 41 | Stephen Zimmerman | USA | PF/C | UNLV | |
| 2016 | 2 | 47 | Jake Layman | USA | SF | Maryland | (from Chicago, traded to Portland) |
| 2017 | 1 | 6 | Jonathan Isaac | USA | SF/PF | Florida State | |
| 2017 | 1 | 25 | Anžejs Pasečņiks | LAT | C | Herbalife Gran Canaria (Spain) | (from Toronto, traded to Philadelphia) |
| 2017 | 2 | 33 | Wesley Iwundu | USA | SF | Kansas State | (from L.A. Lakers) |
| 2017 | 2 | 35 | Ivan Rabb | USA | PF | California | (traded to Memphis) |
| 2018 | 1 | 6 | Mohamed Bamba | USA | C | Texas | |
| 2018 | 2 | 35 | Melvin Frazier | USA | SF | Tulane | |
| 2018 | 2 | 41 | Jarred Vanderbilt | USA | SF | Kentucky | (from Charlotte via Memphis and Phoenix, traded to Denver) |
| 2019 | 1 | 16 | Chuma Okeke | USA | PF | Auburn | |
| 2020 | 1 | 15 | Cole Anthony | USA | PG | North Carolina | |
| 2021 | 1 | 5 | Jalen Suggs | USA | PG/SG | Gonzaga | |
| 2021 | 1 | 8 | Franz Wagner | DE | SF | Michigan | (from Chicago) |
| 2021 | 2 | 33 | Jason Preston | USA | PG | Ohio | (traded to LA Clippers) |
| 2022 | 1 | 1 | Paolo Banchero | USA | PF | Duke | |
| 2022 | 2 | 32 | Caleb Houstan | CAN | SF | Michigan | |
| 2023 | 1 | 6 | Anthony Black | USA | SG | Arkansas | |
| 2023 | 1 | 11 | Jett Howard | USA | SF | Michigan | (from Chicago) |
| 2023 | 2 | 36 | Andre Jackson Jr. | USA | SG | UConn | (traded to Milwaukee) |
