= Robert Woodard II =

American basketball player (born 1999)

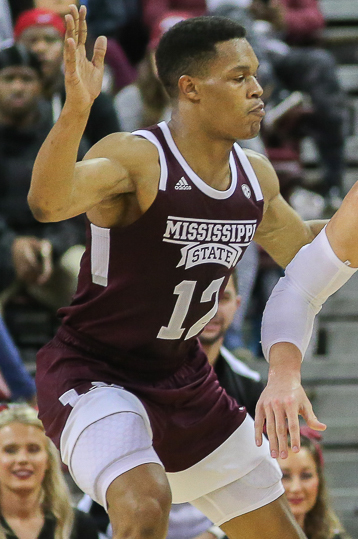
- Woodard with Mississippi State in 2020

Free agent
- Position: Small forward

Personal information
- Born: September 22, 1999 (age 27) Starkville, Mississippi, U.S.
- Listed height: 6 ft 6 in (1.98 m)
- Listed weight: 235 lb (107 kg)

Career information
- High school: Columbus (Columbus, Mississippi)
- College: Mississippi State (2018–2020)
- NBA draft: 2020: 2nd round, 40th overall pick
- Drafted by: Memphis Grizzlies
- Playing career: 2020–present

Career history
- 2020–2022: Sacramento Kings
- 2021: →Austin Spurs
- 2022: →Stockton Kings
- 2022: Oklahoma City Blue
- 2022: Austin Spurs
- 2022–2023: Oklahoma City Blue
- 2023: ADA Blois
- 2023–2024: Maroussi
- 2024–2025: Memphis Hustle
- 2025: Delaware Blue Coats

Career highlights
- All-NBA G League Third Team (2021)
- Stats at NBA.com
- Stats at Basketball Reference
Medals
Men's basketball
Representing the United States
FIBA Americas U16 Championship
Gold medal – first place	2015 Argentina	Team

Robert Anthony Woodard II (born September 22, 1999) is an American professional basketball player who last played for the Delaware Blue Coats of the NBA G League. He played college basketball for Mississippi State.

== Early life ==
Woodard grew up playing basketball and baseball but narrowed his focus to basketball by the time he started high school, in part due to his exceptional height. He was already receiving Division I college attention in eighth grade. He played basketball for Columbus High School in Columbus, Mississippi. As a sophomore, Woodard led Columbus to its first Mississippi Class 6A state title after averaging 20.2 points, 7.1 rebounds and four assists per game. In his junior season, he averaged 25.2 points, 13.1 rebounds, 3.2 assists and three blocks per game and was named Mississippi Gatorade Player of the Year. As a senior, Woodard won his second Class 6A state championship and repeated as Mississippi Gatorade Player of the Year. A four-star recruit and the highest-rated prospect in his state, he committed to play college basketball for Mississippi State over offers from Alabama, Memphis and Ole Miss, among others.

== College career ==
As a freshman, Woodard averaged 5.5 points and 4.1 rebounds per game in 17.4 minutes per game. He started one contest and shot 46 percent on field goals. He spent the following summer working on his shooting and lifting weights. On November 17, 2019, Woodard set career highs with 21 points and 16 rebounds in an 82–59 win over New Orleans. As a sophomore, Woodard averaged 11.4 points and 6.5 rebounds per game. Following the season, Woodard declared for the 2020 NBA draft, with the intention of remaining in the draft. He had career totals of 539 points, 53 steals, 49 blocks, 65 assists and 342 rebounds.

== Professional career ==
=== Sacramento / Stockton Kings / Austin Spurs (2020–2022) ===
Woodard was selected by the Memphis Grizzlies with the 40th pick in the 2020 NBA draft. He was subsequently traded alongside a 2022 second-round draft selection to the Sacramento Kings in exchange for Xavier Tillman. On December 1, 2020, Woodard was signed by the Kings. On February 1, 2021, it was announced Woodard would have his first assignment at the NBA G League for the Austin Spurs.

On January 5, 2022, Woodard was assigned to the Stockton Kings after suffering an undisclosed illness. On February 10, he was waived by the Kings.

=== Oklahoma City Blue (2022–2023) ===
On February 19, 2022, Woodard was acquired via waivers by the Iowa Wolves. Two days later, Woodard was traded to the Oklahoma City Blue in exchange for Melvin Frazier.

On March 4, 2022, Woodard signed a two-way contract with the San Antonio Spurs.

On October 4, 2022, Woodard signed with the Oklahoma City Thunder. On October 7, Woodard was waived after appearing in one pre season game. On November 3, 2022, Woodard was named to the opening night roster for the Oklahoma City Blue.

=== ADA Blois (2023) ===
On August 2, 2023, Woodard signed with ADA Blois of the French Betclic Élite.

=== Maroussi (2023–2024) ===
On December 17, 2023, Woodard signed with Greek club Maroussi for the rest of the season.

=== Memphis Hustle (2024–2025) ===
On October 28, 2024, Woodard joined the Memphis Hustle.

=== Delaware Blue Coats (2025) ===
On January 6, 2025, Woodard was traded to the Delaware Blue Coats.

=== Maine Celtics (2025–present) ===
On December 19, 2025, the Maine Celtics announced that they had signed Woodard.

== National team career ==
Woodard won a gold medal with the United States at the 2015 FIBA Americas Under-16 Championship in Bahía Blanca, Argentina. He played in all five games and averaged 5.6 points and 3.8 rebounds per game.

== Career statistics ==
Legend
GP	Games played	GS	Games started	MPG	Minutes per game
FG%	Field goal percentage	3P%	3-point field goal percentage	FT%	Free throw percentage
RPG	Rebounds per game	APG	Assists per game	SPG	Steals per game
BPG	Blocks per game	PPG	Points per game	**Bold**	Career high

=== NBA ===
Year	Team	GP	GS	MPG	FG%	3P%	FT%	RPG	APG	SPG	BPG	PPG
2020–21	Sacramento	**13**	0	**3.5**	**.400**	.167	.375	**1.2**	.2	.0	**.2**	**1.5**
2021–22	Sacramento	12	0	**3.5**	.125	**.250**	**1.000**	.9	**.3**	**.1**	.1	.6
Career		25	0	3.5	.278	.200	.500	1.1	.2	.0	.2	1.1

=== College ===
Year	Team	GP	GS	MPG	FG%	3P%	FT%	RPG	APG	SPG	BPG	PPG
2018–19	Mississippi State	**34**	1	17.5	.468	.273	.580	4.1	.7	.5	.5	5.5
2019–20	Mississippi State	31	**31**	**33.1**	**.495**	**.429**	**.641**	**6.5**	**1.3**	**1.1**	**1.0**	**11.4**
Career		65	32	24.9	.485	.368	.617	5.3	1.0	.8	.8	8.3

== Personal life ==
Woodard's father, also named Robert Woodard, left high school as the Mississippi all-time leading scorer in boys basketball, with 4,274 points, before playing for Mississippi State at the collegiate level.
