= 2018–19 Orlando Magic season =

NBA professional basketball team season

- Division champions
- Head coach: Steve Clifford
- General manager: John Hammond
- Owners: RDV Sports, Inc.
- Arena: Amway Center

Results
- Record: 42–40 (.512)
- Place: Division: 1st (Southeast); Conference: 7th (Eastern)
- Playoff finish: First round (lost to Raptors 1–4)
- Stats at Basketball Reference

Local media
- Television: Fox Sports Florida
- Radio: 96.9 The Game

The 2018–19 Orlando Magic season was the 30th season of the franchise in the National Basketball Association (NBA). On April 12, 2018, the Magic fired head coach Frank Vogel after the team missed the playoffs. On May 30, Steve Clifford was named as Vogel's replacement. On September 6, owner Richard DeVos died at the age of 92 from complications of an infection.

On April 7, 2019, the Magic clinched a playoff spot for the first time since the 2011–12 season, which had also been their most recent winning season. Additionally, they became the Southeast Division champions for the first time since the 2009–10 season. With the Magic clinching a playoff berth, the longest playoff drought in the eastern conference was inherited by the New York Knicks who failed to qualify for the postseason since 2012–13.

In the playoffs, the Magic were eliminated by the eventual NBA champion Toronto Raptors in the first round, losing in five games.

== Draft picks ==
Round	Pick	Player	Position	Nationality	College / Club
1	6	Mo Bamba	C	United States	Texas
2	35	Melvin Frazier	SF	United States	Tulane
2	43	Justin Jackson	SF	United States	Maryland

== Roster ==
2018–19 Orlando Magic roster
Players

Pos.	No.	Player	Height	Weight	DOB	From
G	14	D. J. Augustin	6 ft 0 in (1.83 m)	183 lb (83 kg)	1987-11-10	Texas
C	5	Mo Bamba	7 ft 0 in (2.13 m)	231 lb (105 kg)	1998-05-12	Texas
C	24	Khem Birch	6 ft 9 in (2.06 m)	235 lb (107 kg)	1992-09-28	UNLV
G	7	Michael Carter-Williams	6 ft 6 in (1.98 m)	190 lb (86 kg)	1991-10-10	Syracuse
G	3	Troy Caupain (TW)	6 ft 4 in (1.93 m)	210 lb (95 kg)	1995-11-29	Cincinnati
G/F	10	Evan Fournier	6 ft 7 in (2.01 m)	205 lb (93 kg)	1992-10-29	France
G	35	Melvin Frazier	6 ft 6 in (1.98 m)	200 lb (91 kg)	1996-08-30	Tulane
G	20	Markelle Fultz	6 ft 4 in (1.93 m)	200 lb (91 kg)	1998-05-29	Washington
F	00	Aaron Gordon	6 ft 9 in (2.06 m)	235 lb (107 kg)	1995-09-16	Arizona
G	22	Jerian Grant	6 ft 4 in (1.93 m)	205 lb (93 kg)	1992-10-09	Notre Dame
F	1	Jonathan Isaac	6 ft 11 in (2.11 m)	210 lb (95 kg)	1997-10-03	Florida State
G/F	25	Wes Iwundu	6 ft 7 in (2.01 m)	195 lb (88 kg)	1994-12-20	Kansas State
F	11	Amile Jefferson (TW)	6 ft 9 in (2.06 m)	222 lb (101 kg)	1993-05-07	Duke
F	2	Jarell Martin	6 ft 10 in (2.08 m)	239 lb (108 kg)	1994-05-24	LSU
C	21	Timofey Mozgov	7 ft 1 in (2.16 m)	275 lb (125 kg)		Russia
G/F	31	Terrence Ross	6 ft 7 in (2.01 m)	206 lb (93 kg)	1991-02-05	Washington
C	9	Nikola Vučević	7 ft 0 in (2.13 m)	260 lb (118 kg)	1990-10-24	USC

Coaches
Head coach
- Steve Clifford
Assistant(s)
- Michael Batiste
- Tyrone Corbin
- Pat Delany
- Steve Hetzel
- Bruce Kreutzer
- Rick Higgins (associate coach/player development)

Legend
- (DP) Unsigned draft pick
- (FA) Free agent
- (S) Suspended
- (GL) On assignment to G League affiliate
- (TW) Two-way affiliate player
- Injured

Roster
Updated: April 4, 2019

== Standings ==
=== Division ===
Southeast Division	W	L	PCT	GB	Home	Road	Div	GP
y – Orlando Magic	42	40	.512	–	25‍–‍16	17‍–‍24	10–6	82
Charlotte Hornets	39	43	.476	3.0	25‍–‍16	14‍–‍27	10–6	82
Miami Heat	39	43	.476	3.0	19‍–‍22	20‍–‍21	7–9	82
Washington Wizards	32	50	.390	10.0	22‍–‍19	10‍–‍31	7–9	82
Atlanta Hawks	29	53	.354	13.0	17‍–‍24	12‍–‍29	6–10	82

=== Conference ===
Eastern Conference
#	Team	W	L	PCT	GB	GP
1	z – Milwaukee Bucks *	60	22	.732	–	82
2	y – Toronto Raptors *	58	24	.707	2.0	82
3	x – Philadelphia 76ers	51	31	.622	9.0	82
4	x – Boston Celtics	49	33	.598	11.0	82
5	x – Indiana Pacers	48	34	.585	12.0	82
6	x – Brooklyn Nets	42	40	.512	18.0	82
7	y – Orlando Magic *	42	40	.512	18.0	82
8	x – Detroit Pistons	41	41	.500	19.0	82
9	Charlotte Hornets	39	43	.476	21.0	82
10	Miami Heat	39	43	.476	21.0	82
11	Washington Wizards	32	50	.390	28.0	82
12	Atlanta Hawks	29	53	.354	31.0	82
13	Chicago Bulls	22	60	.268	38.0	82
14	Cleveland Cavaliers	19	63	.232	41.0	82
15	New York Knicks	17	65	.207	43.0	82

== Game log ==
=== Preseason ===
2018 preseason game log
Total: 2–3 (home: 2–1; road: 0–2)
Preseason: 2–3 (home: 2–1; road: 0–2)

Game	Date	Team	Score	High points	High rebounds	High assists	Location Attendance	Record
1	October 1	@ Philadelphia	L 114–120	Nikola Vučević (20)	Aaron Gordon (7)	D. J. Augustin (6)	Wells Fargo Center; 12,005	0–1
2	October 5	Flamengo	W 119–82	Aaron Gordon (29)	Mo Bamba (9)	Jerian Grant (7)	Amway Center; 14,667	1–1
3	October 8	@ Miami	L 89–90	Nikola Vučević (22)	Nikola Vučević (14)	D. J. Augustin (5)	American Airlines Arena; 19,600	1–2
4	October 10	Memphis	W 102–86	Gordon, Isaac (15)	Nikola Vučević (15)	D. J. Augustin (6)	Amway Center; 14,299	2–2
5	October 12	San Antonio	L 81–100	Evan Fournier (23)	Nikola Vučević (12)	D. J. Augustin (6)	Amway Center; 16,424	2–3

2018–19 season schedule

=== Regular season ===
2018–19 game log
Total: 42–40 (home: 25–16; road: 17–24)
October: 2–5 (home: 1–3; road: 1–2)

Game	Date	Team	Score	High points	High rebounds	High assists	Location Attendance	Record
1	October 17	Miami	W 104–101	Aaron Gordon (26)	Aaron Gordon (16)	Evan Fournier (5)	Amway Center; 19,191	1–0
2	October 19	Charlotte	L 88–120	Terrence Ross (14)	Aaron Gordon (10)	Nikola Vučević (4)	Amway Center; 17,668	1–1
3	October 20	@ Philadelphia	L 115–116	Evan Fournier (31)	Nikola Vučević (13)	Nikola Vučević (12)	Wells Fargo Center; 20,318	1–2
4	October 22	@ Boston	W 93–90	Nikola Vucevic (24)	Isaac, Vučević (12)	Augustin, Fournier (10)	TD Garden; 18,624	2–2
5	October 25	Portland	L 114–128	Nikola Vučević (24)	Nikola Vučević (11)	Evan Fournier (6)	Amway Center; 15,114	2–3
6	October 27	@ Milwaukee	L 91–113	Nikola Vučević (16)	Nikola Vučević (9)	Augustin, Ross (4)	Fiserv Forum; 17,341	2–4
7	October 30	Sacramento	L 99–107	Aaron Gordon (18)	Nikola Vučević (15)	Jerian Grant (6)	Amway Center; 15,074	2–5

November: 9–7 (home: 5–3; road: 4–4)

Game	Date	Team	Score	High points	High rebounds	High assists	Location Attendance	Record
8	November 2	L.A. Clippers	L 95–120	Nikola Vučević (22)	Nikola Vučević (11)	Fournier, Grant (4)	Amway Center; 15,953	2–6
9	November 4	@ San Antonio	W 117–110	Aaron Gordon (26)	Mo Bamba (11)	Augustin, Fournier (7)	AT&T Center; 18,354	3–6
10	November 5	Cleveland	W 102–100	Aaron Gordon (23)	Nikola Vučević (10)	Evan Fournier (5)	Amway Center; 15,009	4–6
11	November 7	Detroit	L 96–103	Evan Fournier (27)	Aaron Gordon (10)	D. J. Augustin (7)	Amway Center; 16,103	4–7
12	November 9	Washington	W 117–108	Nikola Vučević (21)	Nikola Vučević (14)	Evan Fournier (6)	Amway Center; 16,562	5–7
13	November 11	@ New York	W 115–89	Terrence Ross (22)	Nikola Vučević (14)	Jerian Grant (8)	Madison Square Garden; 19,812	6–7
14	November 12	@ Washington	L 109–117	Terrence Ross (21)	Nikola Vučević (11)	Evan Fournier (5)	Capital One Arena; 15,346	6–8
15	November 14	Philadelphia	W 111–106	Nikola Vučević (30)	Nikola Vučević (8)	D. J. Augustin (9)	Amway Center; 15,921	7–8
16	November 17	L.A. Lakers	W 130–117	Nikola Vučević (36)	Nikola Vučević (13)	D. J. Augustin (7)	Amway Center; 19,249	8–8
17	November 18	New York	W 131–117	Aaron Gordon (31)	Nikola Vučević (10)	Nikola Vučević (9)	Amway Center; 15,898	9–8
18	November 20	Toronto	L 91–93	Evan Fournier (27)	Nikola Vučević (18)	Augustin, Grant (5)	Amway Center; 16,016	9–9
19	November 23	@ Denver	L 87–112	Terrence Ross (18)	Aaron Gordon (9)	Fournier, Gordon, Grant (5)	Pepsi Center; 19,520	9–10
20	November 25	@ L.A. Lakers	W 108–104	Nikola Vučević (31)	Nikola Vučević (15)	D. J. Augustin (9)	Staples Center; 18,997	10–10
21	November 26	@ Golden State	L 110–116	Nikola Vučević (30)	Nikola Vučević (12)	D. J. Augustin (9)	Oracle Arena; 19,596	10–11
22	November 28	@ Portland	L 112–115	Nikola Vučević (20)	Nikola Vučević (8)	Grant, Vučević (7)	Moda Center; 18,865	10–12
23	November 30	@ Phoenix	W 99–85	Nikola Vučević (25)	Nikola Vučević (15)	D. J. Augustin (6)	Talking Stick Resort Arena; 13,228	11–12

December : 5–8 (home: 4–5; road: 1–3)

Game	Date	Team	Score	High points	High rebounds	High assists	Location Attendance	Record
24	December 4	@ Miami	W 105–90	Aaron Gordon (20)	Aaron Gordon (13)	Augustin, Gordon (5)	American Airlines Arena; 19,600	12–12
25	December 5	Denver	L 118–124 (OT)	Evan Fournier (26)	Nikola Vučević (14)	Augustin, Gordon (5)	Amway Center; 16,636	12–13
26	December 7	Indiana	L 90–112	Nikola Vučević (22)	Aaron Gordon (14)	Aaron Gordon (4)	Amway Center; 17,214	12–14
27	December 10	@ Dallas	L 76–101	Jonathon Simmons (18)	Nikola Vučević (16)	Nikola Vučević (4)	American Airlines Center; 19,334	12–15
28	December 13	Chicago	W 97–91	Nikola Vučević (26)	Nikola Vučević (10)	Aaron Gordon (7)	Mexico City Arena; 20,201	13–15
29	December 15	Utah	W 96–89	Evan Fournier (24)	Nikola Vučević (19)	Augustin, Vučević (5)	Mexico City Arena; 20,011	14–15
30	December 19	San Antonio	L 90–129	D. J. Augustin (17)	Aaron Gordon (9)	Aaron Gordon (7)	Amway Center; 17,138	14–16
31	December 21	@ Chicago	L 80–90	Evan Fournier (24)	Nikola Vučević (19)	Evan Fournier (6)	United Center; 20,436	14–17
32	December 23	Miami	L 91–115	Evan Fournier (17)	Isaac, Vučević (7)	Aaron Gordon (4)	Amway Center; 18,846	14–18
33	December 26	Phoenix	L 120–122 (OT)	D. J. Augustin (27)	Nikola Vučević (13)	D. J. Augustin (6)	Amway Center; 16,755	14–19
34	December 28	Toronto	W 116–87	Nikola Vučević (30)	Nikola Vučević (20)	Nikola Vučević (8)	Amway Center; 18,846	15–19
35	December 30	Detroit	W 109–107	D. J. Augustin (26)	Nikola Vučević (11)	D. J. Augustin (8)	Amway Center; 17,761	16–19
36	December 31	@ Charlotte	L 100–125	Aaron Gordon (14)	Mo Bamba (12)	Gordon, Grant (5)	Spectrum Center; 14,694	16–20

January : 5–11 (home: 3–4; road: 2–7)

Game	Date	Team	Score	High points	High rebounds	High assists	Location Attendance	Record
37	January 2	@ Chicago	W 112–84	Nikola Vučević (22)	Nikola Vučević (12)	Aaron Gordon (9)	United Center; 19,013	17–20
38	January 4	@ Minnesota	L 103–120	Nikola Vučević (22)	Nikola Vučević (7)	Jonathon Simmons (7)	Target Center; 14,355	17–21
39	January 6	@ L.A. Clippers	L 96–106	Aaron Gordon (17)	Nikola Vučević (24)	Nikola Vučević (8)	Staples Center; 16,616	17–22
40	January 7	@ Sacramento	L 95–111	Terrence Ross (20)	Nikola Vučević (13)	Isaiah Briscoe (4)	Golden 1 Center; 15,724	17–23
41	January 9	@ Utah	L 93–106	D. J. Augustin (23)	Aaron Gordon (10)	D. J. Augustin (6)	Vivint Smart Home Arena; 18,306	17–24
42	January 12	Boston	W 105–103	Aaron Gordon (28)	Nikola Vučević (13)	Fournier, Vučević (5)	Amway Center; 18,846	18–24
43	January 13	Houston	W 116–109	Gordon, Vučević (22)	Nikola Vučević (9)	Nikola Vučević (6)	Amway Center; 16,982	19–24
44	January 16	@ Detroit	L 115–120 (OT)	Ross, Vučević (24)	Nikola Vučević (13)	D. J. Augustin (7)	Little Caesars Arena; 14,019	19–25
45	January 18	Brooklyn	L 115–117	Aaron Gordon (23)	Nikola Vučević (17)	Nikola Vučević (6)	Amway Center; 17,840	19–26
46	January 19	Milwaukee	L 108–118	Nikola Vučević (27)	Bamba, Isaac, Vučević (6)	D. J. Augustin (7)	Amway Center; 18,846	19–27
47	January 21	@ Atlanta	W 122–103	Fournier, Vučević (29)	Nikola Vučević (14)	Fournier, Ross (7)	State Farm Arena; 16,611	20–27
48	January 23	@ Brooklyn	L 110–114	Nikola Vučević (21)	Nikola Vučević (14)	D. J. Augustin (6)	Barclays Center; 13,185	20–28
49	January 25	Washington	L 91–95	Nikola Vučević (28)	Aaron Gordon (11)	Aaron Gordon (6)	Amway Center; 17,216	20–29
50	January 27	@ Houston	L 98–103	Aaron Gordon (23)	Nikola Vučević (17)	Grant, Vučević (5)	Toyota Center; 18,055	20–30
51	January 29	Oklahoma City	L 117–126	Nikola Vučević (27)	Nikola Vučević (11)	Aaron Gordon (7)	Amway Center; 16,341	20–31
52	January 31	Indiana	W 107–100	Terrence Ross (30)	Jonathan Isaac (13)	Isaiah Briscoe (8)	Amway Center; 16,625	21–31

February : 8–3 (home: 4–1; road: 4–2)

Game	Date	Team	Score	High points	High rebounds	High assists	Location Attendance	Record
53	February 2	Brooklyn	W 102–89	Nikola Vučević (24)	Isaac, Vučević (12)	D. J. Augustin (8)	Amway Center; 17,385	22–31
54	February 5	@ Oklahoma City	L 122–132	Terrance Ross (26)	Nikola Vučević (9)	Aaron Gordon (10)	Chesapeake Energy Arena; 18,203	22–32
55	February 7	Minnesota	W 122–112	Terrence Ross (32)	Nikola Vučević (10)	D. J. Augustin (6)	Amway Center; 17,184	23–32
56	February 9	@ Milwaukee	W 103–83	Jonathan Isaac (17)	Nikola Vučević (17)	Isaiah Briscoe (7)	Fiserv Forum; 17,812	24–32
57	February 10	@ Atlanta	W 124–108	Nikola Vučević (19)	Nikola Vučević (12)	D. J. Augustin (10)	State Farm Arena; 13,370	25–32
58	February 12	@ New Orleans	W 118–88	Nikola Vučević (25)	Nikola Vučević (17)	Isaiah Briscoe (8)	Smoothie King Center; 15,733	26–32
59	February 14	Charlotte	W 127–89	Terrence Ross (21)	Gordon, Vučević (11)	D. J. Augustin (7)	Amway Center; 18,846	27–32
All-Star Break
60	February 22	Chicago	L 109–110	Nikola Vučević (19)	Nikola Vučević (13)	Nikola Vučević (7)	Amway Center; 18,846	27–33
61	February 24	@ Toronto	W 113–98	Nikola Vučević (23)	Nikola Vučević (12)	D. J. Augustin (8)	Scotiabank Arena; 19,800	28–33
62	February 26	@ New York	L 103–108	Gordon, Vučević (26)	Nikola Vučević (11)	Evan Fournier (8)	Madison Square Garden; 17,833	28–34
63	February 28	Golden State	W 103–96	Aaron Gordon (22)	Aaron Gordon (15)	Nikola Vučević (6)	Amway Center; 18,846	29–34

March : 9–5 (home: 6–0; road: 3–5)

Game	Date	Team	Score	High points	High rebounds	High assists	Location Attendance	Record
64	March 2	@ Indiana	W 117–112	Nikola Vučević (27)	Gordon, Isaac, Vučević (8)	Evan Fournier (8)	Bankers Life Fieldhouse; 17,923	30–34
65	March 3	@ Cleveland	L 93–107	Nikola Vučević (28)	Nikola Vučević (13)	Nikola Vučević (6)	Quicken Loans Arena; 19,432	30–35
66	March 5	@ Philadelphia	L 106–114	Evan Fournier (25)	Nikola Vučević (12)	D. J. Augustin (5)	Wells Fargo Center; 20,379	30–36
67	March 8	Dallas	W 111–106	Terrence Ross (22)	Nikola Vučević (13)	Nikola Vučević (6)	Amway Center; 19,196	31–36
68	March 10	@ Memphis	L 97–105	Nikola Vučević (26)	Nikola Vučević (10)	Augustin, Gordon (6)	FedExForum; 16,627	31–37
69	March 13	@ Washington	L 90–100	Nikola Vučević (20)	Nikola Vučević (14)	D. J. Augustin (7)	Capital One Arena; 15,107	31–38
70	March 14	Cleveland	W 120–91	Aaron Gordon (21)	Nikola Vučević (11)	D. J. Augustin (7)	Amway Center; 18,091	32–38
71	March 17	Atlanta	W 101–91	Nikola Vučević (27)	Nikola Vučević (21)	D. J. Augustin (9)	Amway Center; 18,045	33–38
72	March 20	New Orleans	W 119–96	Evan Fournier (27)	Nikola Vučević (17)	D. J. Augustin (7)	Amway Center; 17,005	34–38
73	March 22	Memphis	W 123–119 (OT)	Evan Fournier (27)	Evan Fournier (8)	D. J. Augustin (8)	Amway Center; 18,025	35–38
74	March 25	Philadelphia	W 119–98	Nikola Vučević (28)	Nikola Vučević (11)	Evan Fournier (7)	Amway Center; 16,848	36–38
75	March 26	@ Miami	W 104–99	Nikola Vučević (24)	Nikola Vučević (16)	D. J. Augustin (7)	America Airlines Arena; 19,704	37–38
76	March 28	@ Detroit	L 98–115	Aaron Gordon (20)	Nikola Vučević (12)	Augustin, Gordon, Vučević (4)	Little Caesars Arena; 18,128	37–39
77	March 30	@ Indiana	W 121–116	Aaron Gordon (23)	Aaron Gordon (10)	D. J. Augustin (10)	Bankers Life Fieldhouse; 17,923	38–39

April : 4–1 (home: 2–0; road: 2–1)

Game	Date	Team	Score	High points	High rebounds	High assists	Location Attendance	Record
78	April 1	@ Toronto	L 109–121	Evan Fournier (21)	Nikola Vučević (13)	Augustin, Carter-Williams (6)	Scotiabank Arena; 19,800	38–40
79	April 3	New York	W 114–100	Nikola Vučević (29)	Nikola Vučević (13)	D. J. Augustin (8)	Amway Center; 18,846	39–40
80	April 5	Atlanta	W 149–113	Fournier, Ross, Vučević (25)	Gordon, Vučević (11)	Augustin, Gordon (7)	Amway Center; 18,999	40–40
81	April 7	@ Boston	W 116–108	Terrence Ross (26)	Nikola Vučević (12)	D. J. Augustin (13)	TD Garden; 18,624	41–40
82	April 10	@ Charlotte	W 122–114	Terrence Ross (35)	Gordon, Jefferson (7)	Michael Carter-Williams (7)	Spectrum Center; 17,719	42–40

2018–19 season schedule

=== Playoffs ===
2019 playoff game log
First Round: 1–4 (home: 0–2; road: 1–2)

Game	Date	Team	Score	High points	High rebounds	High assists	Location Attendance	Series
1	April 13	@ Toronto	W 104–101	D. J. Augustin (25)	Aaron Gordon (10)	D. J. Augustin (6)	Scotiabank Arena; 19,937	1–0
2	April 16	@ Toronto	L 82–111	Aaron Gordon (20)	Michael Carter-Williams (9)	D. J. Augustin (4)	Scotiabank Arena; 19,964	1–1
3	April 19	Toronto	L 93–98	Terrence Ross (24)	Nikola Vukčević (14)	Aaron Gordon (7)	Amway Center; 19,367	1–2
4	April 21	Toronto	L 85–107	Aaron Gordon (25)	Aaron Gordon (7)	Aaron Gordon (5)	Amway Center; 19,087	1–3
5	April 23	@ Toronto	L 96–115	D. J. Augustin (15)	Khem Birch (11)	Michael Carter-Williams (5)	Scotiabank Arena; 19,800	1–4

2019 playoff schedule

== Player statistics ==
=== Regular season ===
Player	POS	GP	GS	MP	REB	AST	STL	BLK	PTS	MPG	RPG	APG	SPG	BPG	PPG
Evan Fournier	SG	81	81	2,553	258	295	71	12	1,226	31.5	3.2	3.6	.9	.1	15.1
D. J. Augustin	PG	81	81	2,269	203	426	52	4	948	28.0	2.5	5.3	.6	.0	11.7
Terrence Ross	SG	81	0	2,150	280	135	72	29	1,223	26.5	3.5	1.7	.9	.4	15.1
Nikola Vučević	C	80	80	2,510	960	307	81	89	1,665	31.4	12.0	3.8	1.0	1.1	20.8
Aaron Gordon	PF	78	78	2,633	574	289	57	56	1,246	33.8	7.4	3.7	.7	.7	16.0
Jonathan Isaac	PF	75	64	1,996	411	80	59	98	720	26.6	5.5	1.1	.8	1.3	9.6
Wes Iwundu	SF	68	13	1,233	184	73	28	22	339	18.1	2.7	1.1	.4	.3	5.0
Jerian Grant	PG	60	1	939	98	156	44	6	250	15.7	1.6	2.6	.7	.1	4.2
Khem Birch	C	50	1	643	190	38	18	29	240	12.9	3.8	.8	.4	.6	4.8
Mo Bamba	C	47	1	766	233	39	13	64	292	16.3	5.0	.8	.3	1.4	6.2
Jarell Martin	PF	42	1	328	73	18	3	8	115	7.8	1.7	.4	.1	.2	2.7
Jonathon Simmons^{†}	SG	41	9	845	100	95	18	14	283	20.6	2.4	2.3	.4	.3	6.9
Isaiah Briscoe	PG	39	0	559	74	87	11	2	136	14.3	1.9	2.2	.3	.1	3.5
Michael Carter-Williams^{†}	PG	12	0	227	57	49	11	9	65	18.9	4.8	4.1	.9	.8	5.4
Amile Jefferson	PF	12	0	68	21	3	3	3	27	5.7	1.8	.3	.3	.3	2.3
Melvin Frazier	SG	10	0	44	5	1	1	0	15	4.4	.5	.1	.1	.0	1.5
Troy Caupain	PG	4	0	16	3	4	1	0	10	4.0	.8	1.0	.3	.0	2.5

- ^{†} Denotes player spent time with another team in the season. Stats reflect time with the Magic only.

=== Playoffs ===
Player	POS	GP	GS	MP	REB	AST	STL	BLK	PTS	MPG	RPG	APG	SPG	BPG	PPG
Evan Fournier	SG	5	5	175	16	10	7	0	62	35.0	3.2	2.0	1.4	.0	12.4
Aaron Gordon	PF	5	5	164	36	18	6	1	76	32.8	7.2	3.6	1.2	.2	15.2
Nikola Vučević	C	5	5	147	40	15	2	5	56	29.4	8.0	3.0	.4	1.0	11.2
D. J. Augustin	PG	5	5	141	8	19	2	1	64	28.2	1.6	3.8	.4	.2	12.8
Jonathan Isaac	PF	5	5	137	31	2	2	5	33	27.4	6.2	.4	.4	1.0	6.6
Terrence Ross	SG	5	0	146	18	7	6	2	66	29.2	3.6	1.4	1.2	.4	13.2
Michael Carter-Williams	PG	5	0	92	20	12	3	0	33	18.4	4.0	2.4	.6	.0	6.6
Khem Birch	C	5	0	92	31	4	1	5	26	18.4	6.2	.8	.2	1.0	5.2
Wes Iwundu	SF	5	0	60	7	4	3	0	24	12.0	1.4	.8	.6	.0	4.8
Jarell Martin	PF	3	0	18	2	1	0	1	10	6.0	.7	.3	.0	.3	3.3
Melvin Frazier	SG	3	0	15	4	0	1	0	5	5.0	1.3	.0	.3	.0	1.7
Jerian Grant	PG	3	0	14	4	3	0	0	5	4.7	1.3	1.0	.0	.0	1.7

== Transactions ==
=== Trades ===
June 21, 2018	To Orlando Magic Draft rights to Justin Jackson; 2019 second-round pick	To Denver Nuggets Draft rights to Jarred Vanderbilt
July 7, 2018	To Orlando Magic Jerian Grant (from Chicago); Timofey Mozgov (from Charlotte)	To Charlotte Hornets Bismack Biyombo (from Orlando); 2019 second round pick (from Orlando); 2020 second round pick (from Orlando)
July 7, 2018	To Chicago Bulls Julyan Stone (from Charlotte)	
July 20, 2018	To Orlando Magic Dakari Johnson; Cash considerations	To Oklahoma City Thunder Rodney Purvis
July 23, 2018	To Orlando Magic Jarell Martin; Cash considerations	To Memphis Grizzlies Dakari Johnson

=== Free agency ===
==== Re-signed ====
Player	Signed
Aaron Gordon	July 6, 2018

==== Additions ====
Player	Signed	Former team
Isaiah Briscoe	July 6, 2018	(Estonia) BC Kalev
Troy Caupain	Two-way contract	(Italy) G.S.A. Udine
Amile Jefferson	Two-way contract	Minnesota Timberwolves
B. J. Johnson	September 5, 2018	La Salle Explorers
Gabe York	September 5, 2018	(Germany) Medi Bayreuth

==== Subtractions ====
Player	Reason left	New team
Marreese Speights	Unrestricted free agent	(China) Guangzhou Long-Lions
Shelvin Mack	Waived	Memphis Grizzlies
Mario Hezonja	Free agency	New York Knicks

== Awards and honors ==
- Nikola Vučević – All-Star
