= Jonathan Isaac =

American basketball player (born 1997)

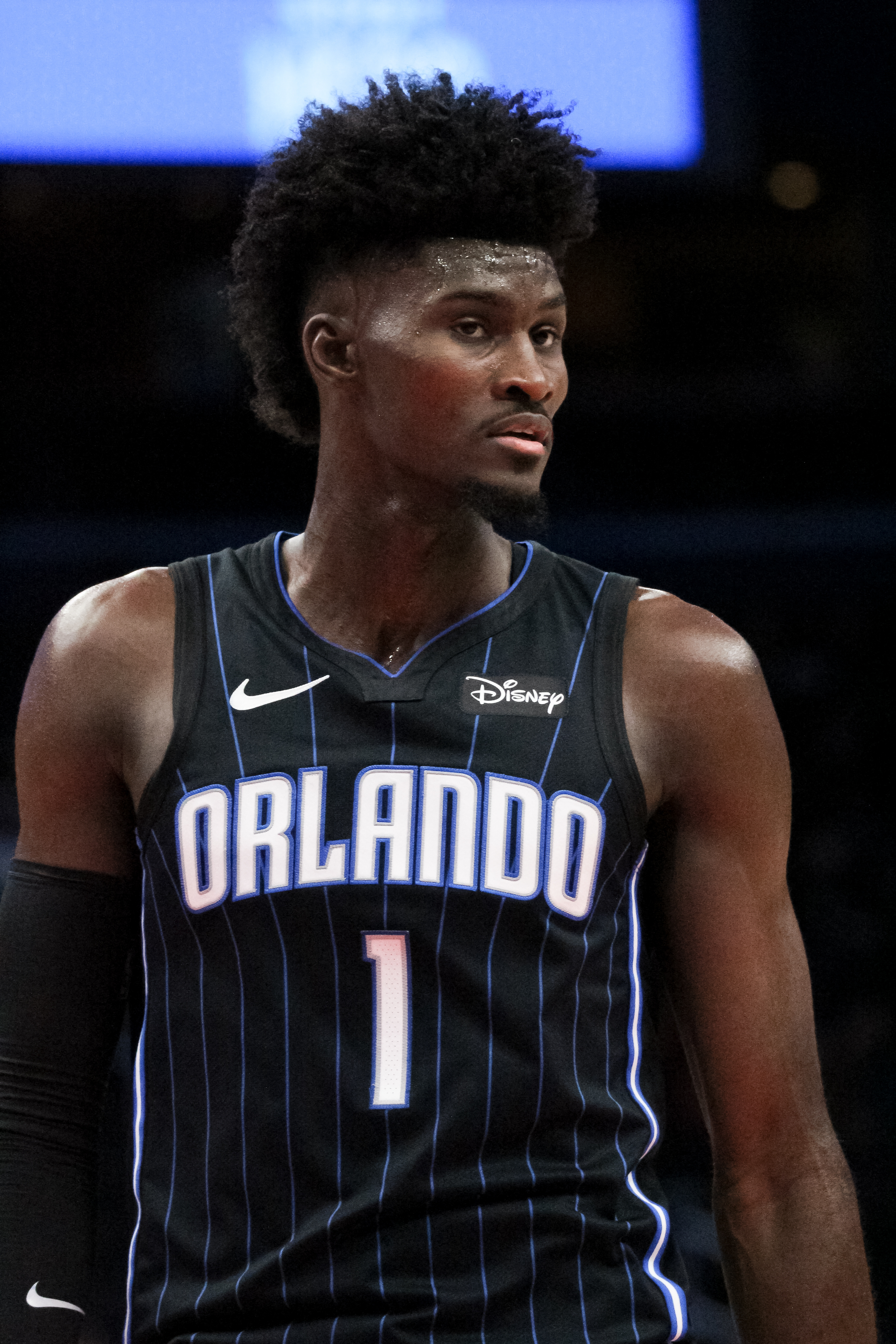
- Isaac with the Orlando Magic in 2019

No. 1 – Orlando Magic
- Position: Power forward / small forward
- League: NBA

Personal information
- Born: October 3, 1997 (age 29) The Bronx, New York, U.S.
- Listed height: 6 ft 10 in (2.08 m)
- Listed weight: 240 lb (109 kg)

Career information
- High school: Barron G. Collier (Naples, Florida); International School of Broward (Hollywood, Florida); IMG Academy (Bradenton, Florida)
- College: Florida State (2016–2017)
- NBA draft: 2017: 1st round, 6th overall pick
- Drafted by: Orlando Magic
- Playing career: 2017–present

Career history
- 2017–present: Orlando Magic
- 2018, 2023: →Lakeland Magic

Career highlights
- ACC All-Freshman team (2017)
- Stats at NBA.com
- Stats at Basketball Reference

Jonathan Judah Isaac (born October 3, 1997) is an American professional basketball player for the Orlando Magic of the National Basketball Association (NBA). He played college basketball for one season for the Florida State Seminoles. Isaac was selected with the sixth overall pick by the Magic in the 2017 NBA draft.

== High school career ==
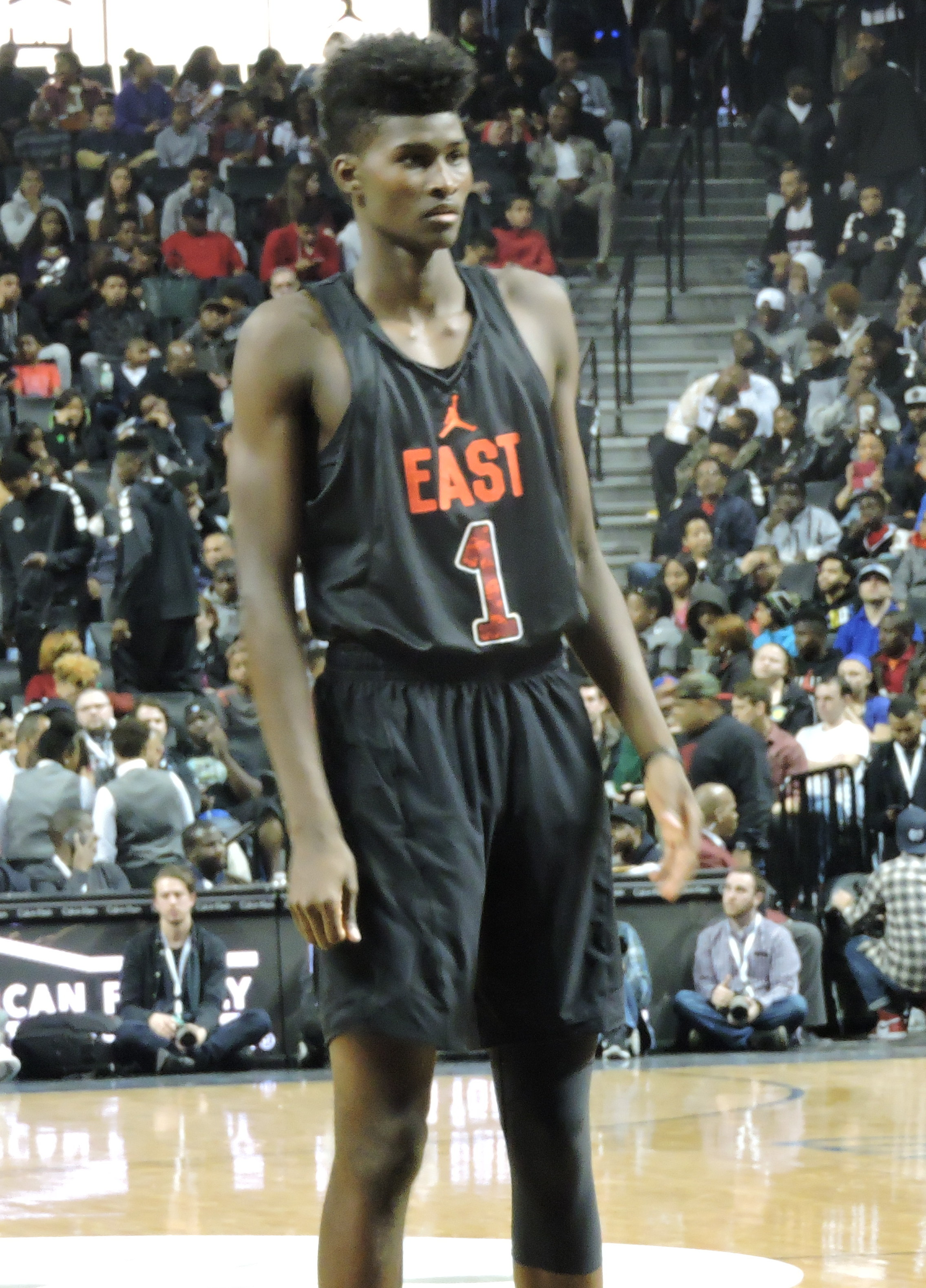
Isaac at the 2016 Jordan Brand Classic

Isaac first attended Barron Collier High School in Naples, Florida during his freshman and sophomore years. In his junior and senior years, he attended the International School of Broward in Hollywood, Florida. However, as a result of wanting to be reclassified as part of the high school class of 2016, Isaac also attended IMG Academy for what was considered to be a postgraduate year in 2016. As a senior in 2016, he averaged 17.6 points per game and 10.0 rebounds per game while leading IMG Academy to a 21–10 overall record. In his high school career, he grew six inches from his freshman year to his senior year, going from a combo guard of sorts to the combo forward he is today. Isaac was selected to play in the 2016 Jordan Brand Classic and Nike Hoop Summit All-Star games. Isaac was rated as a five-star recruit and ranked as the No.12 overall recruit and No.4 Small forward in the 2016 high school class. On July 5, 2015, Isaac confirmed that he was going to commit to Florida State after his senior year of high school ended.

On February 5, 2016, he announced his intention of testing the possibility of entering the 2016 NBA draft as the first American postgraduate to jump directly from high school to the NBA draft since 2005. He was also considered a prospect that could have been taken in the middle or late first round had he committed to it. Four days after making that announcement, however, Isaac confirmed that he was not going to enter the 2016 draft after all and reaffirmed his intentions of playing with Florida State for the 2016–17 season.

College recruiting
Name	Hometown	School	Height	Weight	Commit date
Jonathan Isaac #4 SF	Naples, FL	IMG Academy	6 ft 10 in (2.08 m)	185 lb (84 kg)	Jun 7, 2015
Jonathan Isaac #4 SF	Recruit ratings: Scout: Rivals: 247Sports: ESPN:				
Overall recruit ranking: Scout: 5th (3 SF) Rivals: 8th 247Sports: 8th (2 SF) ESPN: 12th (4 SF)
Note: In many cases, Scout, Rivals, 247Sports, On3, and ESPN may conflict in their listings of height and weight.; In these cases, the average was taken. ESPN grades are on a 100-point scale.; Sources: "2016 Team Ranking". Rivals.

== College career ==
Before the 2016–17 season began, Isaac was considered a preseason watch for the Karl Malone Award. Isaac would record his first double-double of the season with 14 points and 10 rebounds in a 100–71 win over Detroit on November 20. He'd earned the ACC Freshman of the Week award for his performances from November 15–21, 2016. On January 18, 2017, Isaac recorded 23 points, 10 rebounds, and a season-high 7 blocks in a win over the Notre Dame Fighting Irish. On February 8, 2017, Isaac scored 21 points in a 95–71 victory against the NC State Wolfpack. Throughout the season, Isaac was considered a team leader alongside fellow prospects Dwayne Bacon and Xavier Rathan-Mayes, to the point where they at one point were considered the sixth-best team in the nation. As the second seed in the ACC tournament, Florida State beat Virginia Tech in the quarterfinals, but lost to Notre Dame in the semi-finals. His team then proceeded to the NCAA Tournament, where they were seeded 3rd in the West. They won their first-round game 86–80 against Florida Gulf Coast at Amway Center in Orlando, Florida. However, they lost in the round of 32 in a blowout upset against 11th-seeded Xavier, 91–66. Isaac scored just 25 points in two games In his NCAA Tournament career. At the conclusion of his freshman season, he was named to the All-ACC Freshman Team of 2017. In addition to that, Isaac announced his intention to forgo his final three years of collegiate eligibility and enter the 2017 NBA draft where he was projected as a lottery first round selection. He was the second player in Florida State's basketball history to leave as a one-and-done prospect, behind Malik Beasley in 2016.

== Professional career ==
On June 22, 2017, Isaac was selected with the sixth overall pick in the 2017 NBA draft by the Orlando Magic. On December 28, he was ruled out with a right ankle sprain. On February 23, 2018, he was assigned to the Lakeland Magic of the NBA G League for rehabilitation purposes.

In his second year in the league, Isaac became a starter for the Magic in 64 games, posting career-high averages in points, rebounds, assists, and blocks per game. On January 31, 2019, he recorded a career-high 13 rebounds in a 107–100 win over the Indiana Pacers. On February 10, he matched his career-high of five blocks, to go along with 17 points and two steals in a 124–108 win over the Atlanta Hawks. On February 12, he scored a career-high 20 points in a 118–88 win over the New Orleans Pelicans.

Isaac improved on his previous career-high in scoring by posting 24 points in a 95–104 loss to the Toronto Raptors on October 28, 2019. On January 1, 2020, he suffered a posterior lateral corner injury and a medial bone contusion in his left knee during a 122–101 win over the Washington Wizards and was expected to be sidelined for about eight to ten weeks. On August 2, Isaac suffered torn anterior cruciate ligament in his left knee during a 132–116 win over the Sacramento Kings hosted in the 2020 NBA Bubble. Isaac later underwent successful surgery on August 7 to repair his torn left ACL and meniscus, and was expected to miss the remainder of 2019–20 NBA season. On August 31, Magic team president Jeff Weltman confirmed Isaac would also miss the entire 2020–21 NBA season with the injury. On December 21, Isaac signed a four-year, $80 million extension through the 2023–24 season.

On March 15, 2022, Weltman announced that Isaac would miss the remainder of the 2021–22 NBA season due to the injury. He had not yet played during the season. On March 22, Isaac suffered a minor injury to his right hamstring during his rehab and underwent a surgical procedure.

On January 10, 2023, Isaac was assigned to the Magic's G League affiliate for just one game. On January 23, he returned to the court after over two and a half years, recording 10 points, three rebounds, and two steals in nine minutes in a 113–98 win over the Boston Celtics. On February 28, during practice in Milwaukee, Isaac felt discomfort, and an MRI a day later revealed a torn left adductor muscle. On March 3, he underwent season-ending surgery to address the injury.

On July 6, 2024, Isaac signed a five-year, $84 million extension through 2028–29. He made 71 appearances (starting one) for Orlando during the 2024–25 season, averaging 5.4 points and 4.4 rebounds. Isaac made 52 reserve appearances for the Magic during the 2025–26 season, posting averages of 2.6 points and 2.5 rebounds.

On June 27, 2026, Isaac was waived by the Magic in a move intended to save money before his contract became fully guaranteed. Four days later, he re-signed with the Magic on a one-year $3.52 million contract.

== Career statistics ==
Legend
GP	Games played	GS	Games started	MPG	Minutes per game
FG%	Field goal percentage	3P%	3-point field goal percentage	FT%	Free throw percentage
RPG	Rebounds per game	APG	Assists per game	SPG	Steals per game
BPG	Blocks per game	PPG	Points per game	**Bold**	Career high

=== NBA ===
==== Regular season ====
Year	Team	GP	GS	MPG	FG%	3P%	FT%	RPG	APG	SPG	BPG	PPG
2017–18	Orlando	27	10	19.8	.379	.348	.760	3.7	.7	1.2	1.1	5.4
2018–19	Orlando	**75**	**64**	26.6	.429	.323	**.815**	5.5	1.1	.8	1.3	9.6
2019–20	Orlando	34	32	**28.8**	.470	.340	.779	**6.8**	**1.4**	**1.6**	**2.3**	**11.9**
2022–23	Orlando	11	0	11.3	.415	**.400**	.556	4.0	.5	1.3	.4	5.0
2023–24	Orlando	58	2	15.8	**.510**	.375	.720	4.5	.5	.7	1.2	6.8
2024–25	Orlando	71	1	15.4	.414	.258	.682	4.4	.6	.9	1.1	5.4
2025–26	Orlando	52	0	10.0	.422	.184	.603	2.5	.4	.4	.6	2.6
Career		328	109	18.8	.441	.316	.732	4.5	.7	.9	1.2	6.8

==== Playoffs ====
Year	Team	GP	GS	MPG	FG%	3P%	FT%	RPG	APG	SPG	BPG	PPG
2019	Orlando	5	**5**	**27.3**	.275	.200	.875	**6.2**	**.4**	.4	1.0	**6.6**
2024	Orlando	**7**	3	21.0	.410	**.370**	**1.000**	4.9	**.4**	**.7**	**1.3**	6.3
2025	Orlando	5	0	13.8	**.583**	.250	.600	2.0	**.4**	.4	.2	3.6
Career		17	8	20.8	.374	.294	.800	4.4	.4	.5	.9	5.6

=== College ===
Year	Team	GP	GS	MPG	FG%	3P%	FT%	RPG	APG	SPG	BPG	PPG
2016–17	Florida State	32	32	26.2	.508	.348	.780	7.8	1.2	1.2	1.5	12.0

== Personal life ==
Isaac is one of six children born to Jackie Allen. He has one older sister, two older brothers, and two younger brothers. Isaac is of Puerto Rican descent due to his maternal grandfather and is eligible to play for the Puerto Rican national team.

Isaac was raised as a Christian and attended church but did not embrace his religion until after he entered the NBA. He has preached at Jump Ministries Global Church in Orlando.

Isaac developed anxiety as a middle school student when he struggled to fit in as a black student among predominantly white classmates. His anxiety persisted through his college season and early NBA years.

In a July 31, 2020, game against the Brooklyn Nets in the NBA Bubble, Isaac was the only player to stand during the U.S. national anthem. When asked about this decision after the game, he responded:

I believe that black lives matter. A lot went into my decision ... It's my thought that kneeling or wearing a 'Black Lives Matter' t-shirt don't go hand in hand with supporting black lives ... I feel like Black lives are supported through the gospel, all lives are supported through the gospel. And we all have things that we do wrong and sometimes it gets to a place of pointing fingers about who’s wrong is worse…We all fall short of God’s glory, and at the end of the day, whoever will humble themselves and seek God and repent their sins, then we can see it in a different light. See our mistakes, and see people’s mistakes in a different light. See people’s evil in a different light. And that it would help bring us closer together and get past anything that’s on the surface that doesn't really deal with the hearts of men and women.

Isaac spoke at the ReAwaken America Tour on standing during the anthem and declining the COVID-19 vaccine. Isaac is a national conservative and has spoken at the annual National Conservatism Conference.

On September 18, 2021, Isaac married his fiancée, Takita Nicole Thomas.

=== Books ===
On May 17, 2022, Isaac's first book Why I Stand was published. In the book, Isaac shares how his Christian faith shaped his life and helped him overcome various struggles.
