= Terrence Ross =

American basketball player (born 1991)

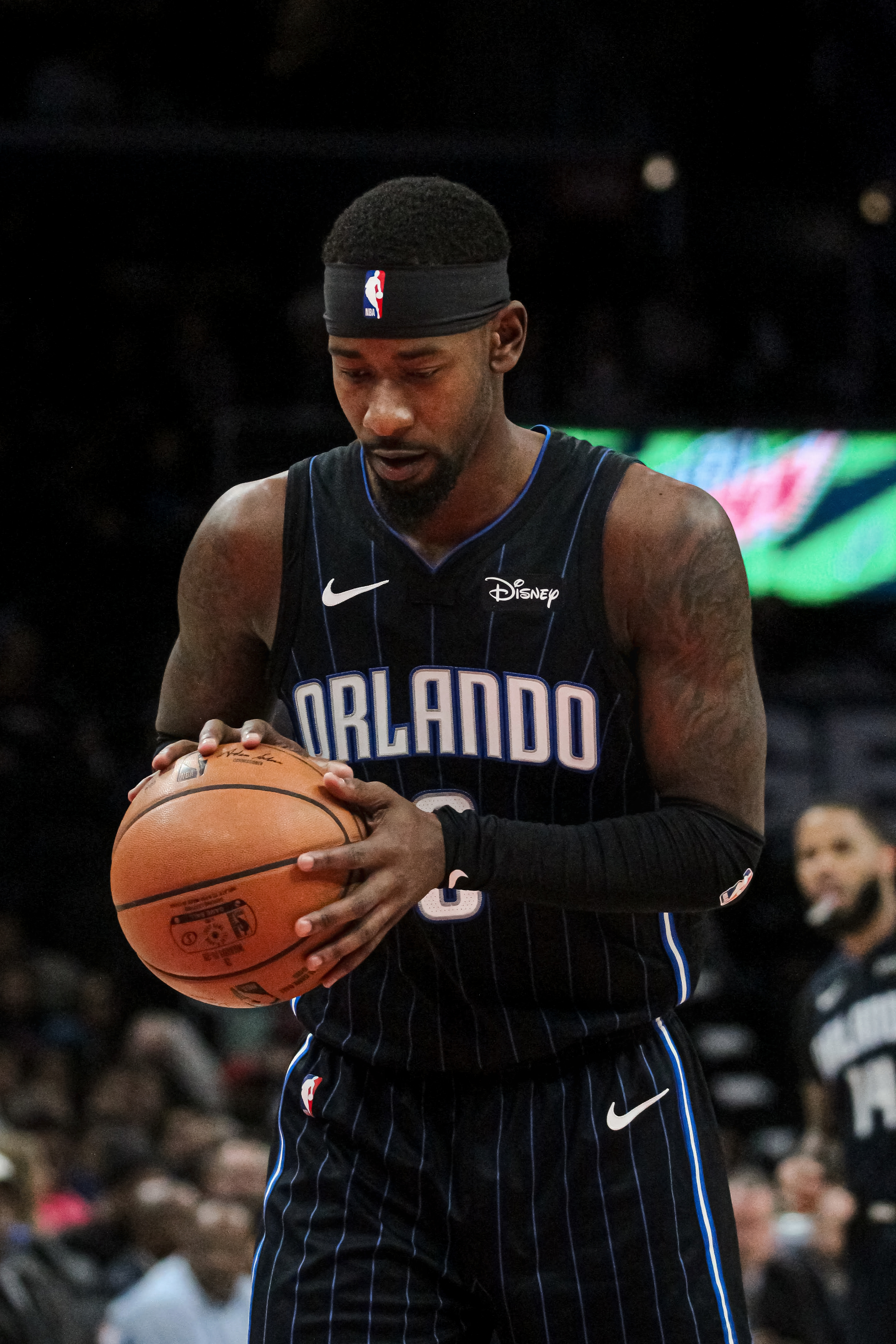
- Ross with the Orlando Magic in 2019

Personal information
- Born: February 5, 1991 (age 35) Long Beach, California, U.S.
- Listed height: 6 ft 7 in (2.01 m)
- Listed weight: 206 lb (93 kg)

Career information
- High school: Jefferson (Portland, Oregon); Montrose Christian (Rockville, Maryland)
- College: Washington (2010–2012)
- NBA draft: 2012: 1st round, 8th overall pick
- Drafted by: Toronto Raptors
- Playing career: 2012–2023
- Position: Shooting guard / small forward
- Number: 8, 31

Career history
- 2012–2017: Toronto Raptors
- 2017–2023: Orlando Magic
- 2023: Phoenix Suns

Career highlights
- NBA Slam Dunk Contest champion (2013); First-team All-Pac-12 (2012)

Career statistics
- Points: 8,047 (11.0 ppg)
- Rebounds: 2,061 (2.8 rpg)
- Assists: 936 (1.3 apg)
- Stats at NBA.com
- Stats at Basketball Reference

Terrence James Elijah Ross (born February 5, 1991) is an American former professional basketball player. A shooting guard/small forward, he played college basketball for the Washington Huskies, where he was a first-team All-Pac-12 selection before being drafted eighth overall in the 2012 NBA draft by the Toronto Raptors.

As a rookie, Ross was crowned champion of the 2013 Slam Dunk Contest. In January 2014, he became the first player in NBA history to score 50 or more points in a game while averaging fewer than 10 points per game at the time. In February 2017, he was traded to the Orlando Magic. He joined the Phoenix Suns in February 2023 after reaching a contract buyout agreement with the Magic.

== Early life ==
Ross was born in Long Beach, California, to Terry and Marcine Ross. Both of his parents played college basketball for the Cal Poly Pomona Bronocos and were students when Ross was born. His mother, Marcine Parker (née Edmonds), played as a power forward for the Broncos; Ross wore the jersey number 31 in tribute to her as she used the number during her career. His father, Terry, played professionally in the defunct Continental Basketball Association (CBA) and won the slam dunk title while with the Tri-City Chinook in 1995.

When his parents divorced, Ross and his younger sister, Taelor, moved with their mother to Los Angeles where she worked as a gym teacher. The family moved often and eventually settled in Portland, Oregon, when Ross was in middle school.

== High school career ==
As a freshman and sophomore, Ross attended Jefferson High School in Portland, Oregon where he won the Oregon 5A Player of the Year, after leading Jefferson to the first of three consecutive state championships. As a junior in 2008–09, he attended Montrose Christian School in Rockville, Maryland where he was first-team All-Metro after averaging 13.5 points per game for the number 1 ranked Montrose. Midway through his senior year, Ross returned to Jefferson High School but could not play basketball due to transfer rules.

On April 30, 2010, Ross signed a National Letter of Intent to play college basketball for the University of Washington.

Considered a four-star recruit by ESPN.com, Ross was listed as the No. 5 small forward and the No. 30 player in the nation in 2010.

== College career ==
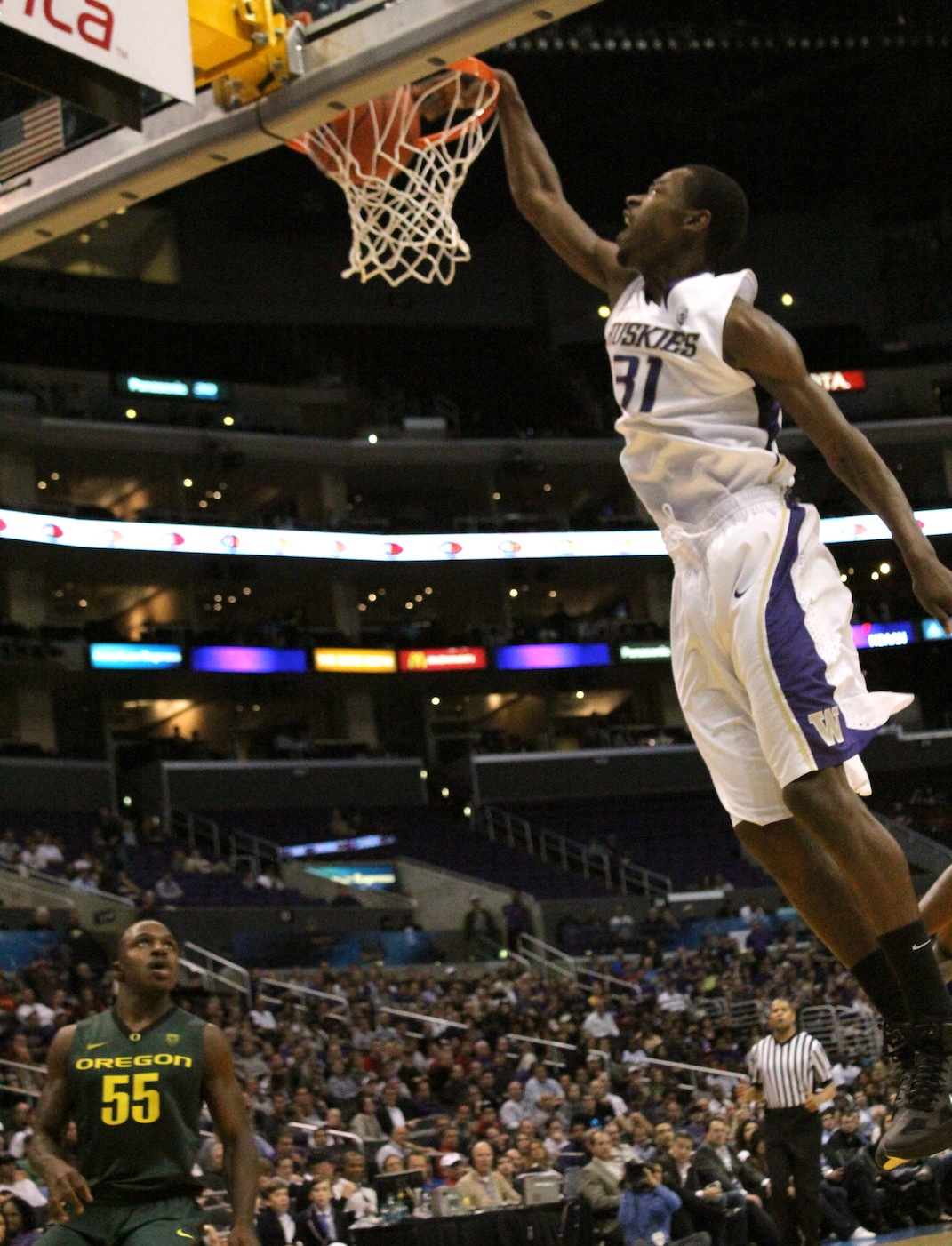
Ross dunking for Washington

In his freshman season with the Huskies, Ross earned honorable mention Pac-10 All-Freshman team honors after averaging 8.0 points, 2.8 rebounds and 1.0 assists in 34 games. He was also named to the Pac-10 All-Tournament team after averaging 15.3 points and 2.7 rebounds per game in the 2011 Pac-10 tournament.

In his sophomore season, Ross earned first-team All-Pac-12 honors after averaging 16.4 points, 6.4 rebounds, 1.4 assists, and 1.3 steals in 35 games. He helped Washington reach the semi-finals of the 2012 National Invitation Tournament with averages of 25.0 points and 5.5 rebounds per game.

On April 1, 2012, Ross declared for the NBA draft, foregoing his final two years of college eligibility.

== Professional career ==
=== Toronto Raptors (2012–2017) ===
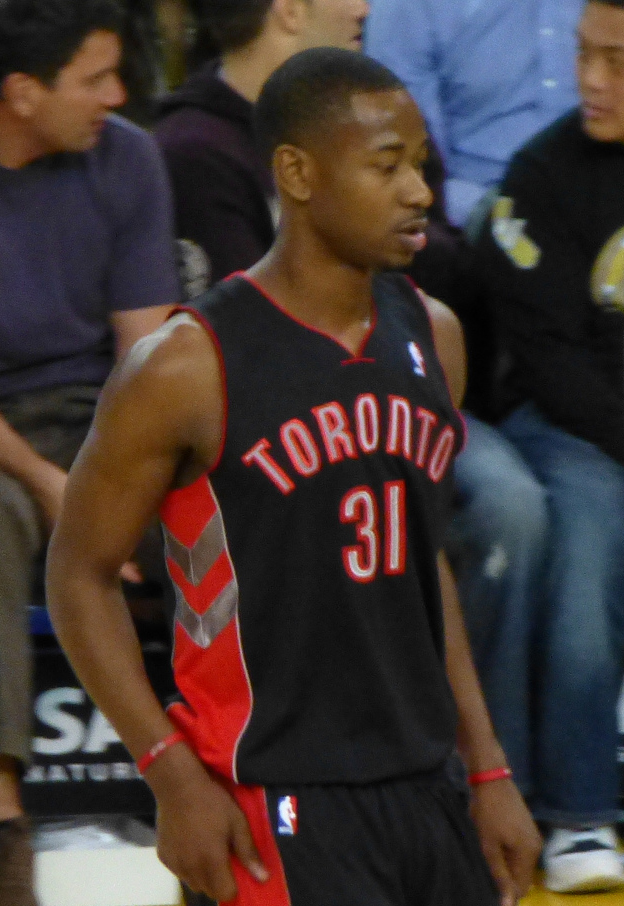
Ross with the Raptors in 2013

On June 28, 2012, Ross was selected with the eighth overall pick in the 2012 NBA draft by the Toronto Raptors. On July 10, he signed his rookie scale contract with the Raptors.

On January 2, 2013, Ross had a season-best game with 26 points and six three-pointers in a 102–79 win over the Portland Trail Blazers. On February 16, Ross defeated Jeremy Evans in the 2013 Sprite Slam Dunk Contest, receiving 58% of the vote from fans worldwide in the final round. On October 24, the Raptors exercised their third-year team option on Ross' rookie scale contract, extending the contract through the 2014–15 season.

On January 25, 2014, Ross scored a career-high and franchise-tying 51 points in a 126–118 loss to the Los Angeles Clippers. He was 16-for-29 from the floor, 10-for-17 from behind the arc (his 10 three-pointers set a career high) and 9-for-10 from the free-throw line. He tied the franchise record for points in a game set by Vince Carter on February 27, 2000. Ross entered the game averaging 9.3 points per game, making him the first player in NBA history to have a 50-point game while averaging under 10 points per game.

On October 13, 2014, the Raptors exercised their fourth-year team option on Ross's rookie scale contract, extending the contract through the 2015–16 season. On February 4, 2015, he scored a season-high 23 points and matched a season high with five three-pointers in a loss to the Brooklyn Nets.

On November 2, 2015, Ross signed a three-year, $33 million contract extension with the Raptors. Ross averaged just 6.3 points in 17.5 minutes over the first seven games of the season, coming off the bench in all seven. He then missed six games with a left thumb injury before returning to action on November 20, scoring eight points in a 102–91 win over the Los Angeles Lakers. He made his first start of the season on December 7, also against the Lakers, scoring a season-high 22 points in place of injured starter DeMarre Carroll. On February 28, 2016, he set a new season high with 27 points in a 114–101 loss to the Detroit Pistons.

On March 30, he scored 13 points in a 105–97 win over the Atlanta Hawks, helping the Raptors record a 50-win season for the first time in franchise history. In the Raptors' regular-season finale on April 13, Ross recorded his first double-double of the season with 24 points and 10 rebounds off the bench in a 103–96 win over the Brooklyn Nets.

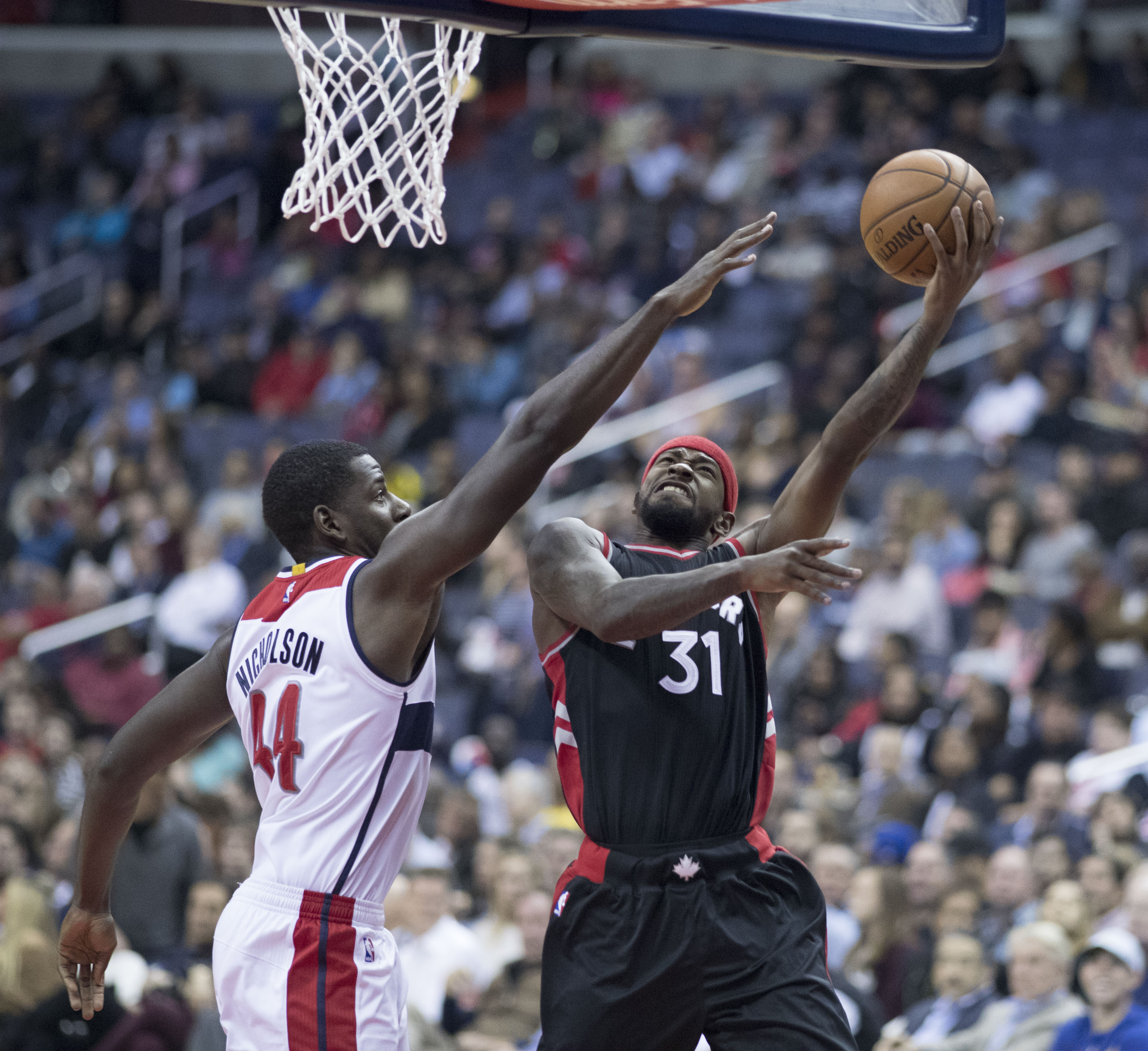
Ross attempting a lay-up against the Washington Wizards in November 2016

The Raptors finished the regular season as the second seed in the East with a 56–26 record. After defeating the Indiana Pacers 4–3 in the first round of the playoffs, the Raptors moved on to the second round for the first time since 2001. In game 1 of the conference semi-finals against the Miami Heat, Ross set a career playoff high with 19 points in a 102–96 loss. On November 28, 2016, Ross scored a season-high 22 points in a 122–95 win over the Philadelphia 76ers. He set a new season high on December 12, scoring 25 points in a 122–100 win over the Milwaukee Bucks.

=== Orlando Magic (2017–2023) ===
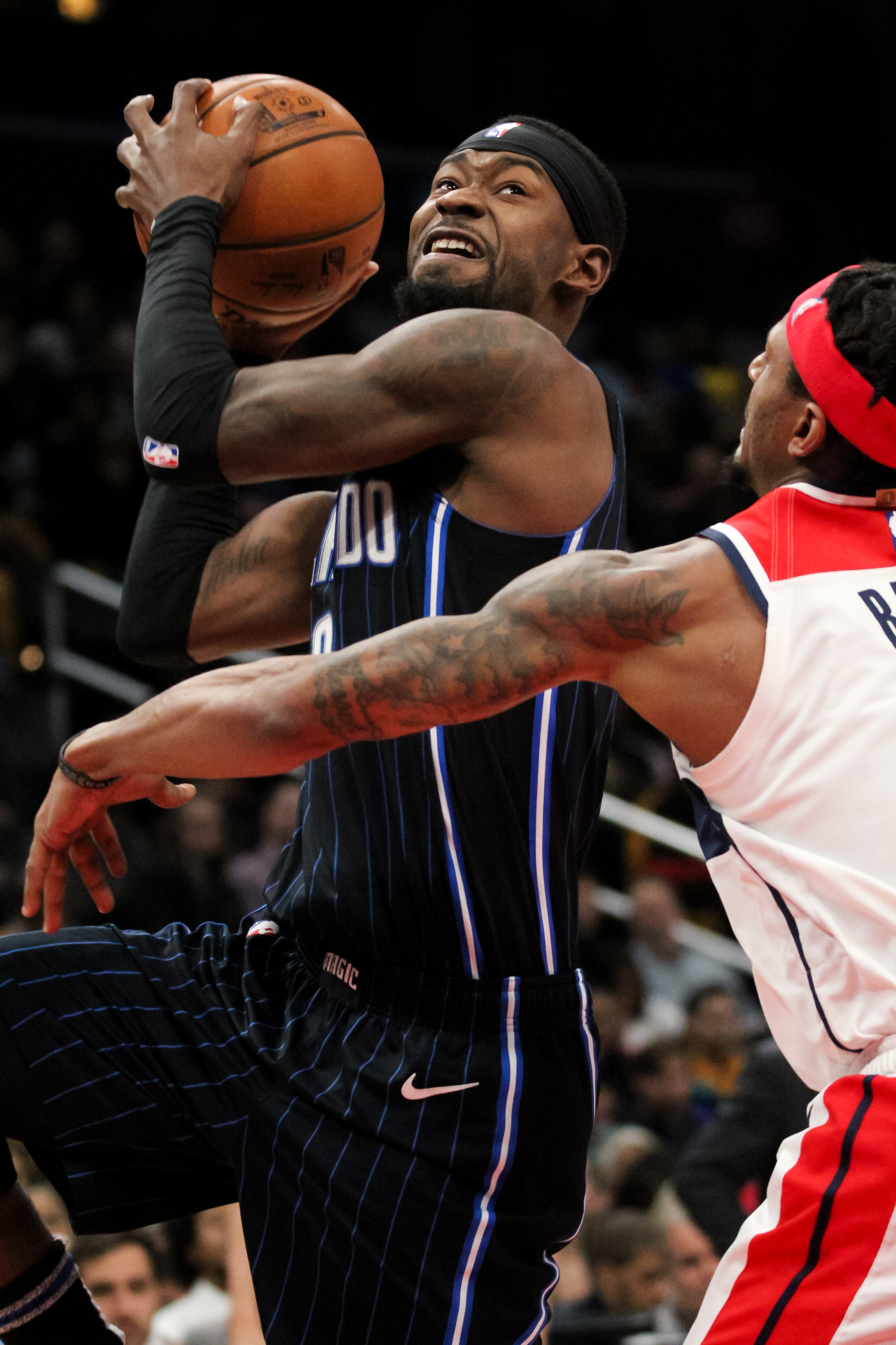
Ross in 2019 with the Magic

On February 14, 2017, Ross was traded, along with a 2017 first-round draft pick, to the Orlando Magic in exchange for Serge Ibaka. He made his debut for the Magic on February 23, recording 13 points on 4-of-17 shooting, which included a 2-for-8 showing from three-point range, in a 112–103 loss to the Portland Trail Blazers. Two days later, he scored a game-high 24 points in a 105–86 win over the Atlanta Hawks. On April 8, he scored a season-high 29 points in a 127–112 loss to the Indiana Pacers.

On November 22, 2017, Ross scored a season-high 22 points in a 124–118 loss to the Minnesota Timberwolves. On the 30th, he was ruled out indefinitely after being diagnosed with a sprained right medial collateral ligament (MCL) and a non-displaced fracture of his right tibial plateau. He suffered the injury the night before against the Oklahoma City Thunder. Ross returned to action on April 8, 2018, after missing more than four months. He scored three points in 10 minutes in the Magic's 112–101 loss to the Raptors.

On February 7, 2019, Ross scored 32 points and hit six 3-pointers in a 122–112 win over the Timberwolves. On March 22, he scored a game-high 31 points and made a season-high eight 3-pointers in a 123–119 overtime win over the Memphis Grizzlies. On April 10, in the Magic's regular-season finale, Ross scored a season-high 35 points in a 122–114 win over the Charlotte Hornets. On June 30, Ross was re-signed by the Magic for a four-year, $54 million deal.

On March 4, 2020, in a 116–113 loss to the Miami Heat, Ross scored 35 points behind eight three-pointers, both season highs, while not recording a single rebound, assist, block, or steal.

On February 11, 2023, Ross and the Magic reached a contract buyout agreement.

=== Phoenix Suns and retirement (2023) ===
On February 15, 2023, Ross signed with the Phoenix Suns. On December 1, 2023, Ross announced his retirement from the NBA.

== Career statistics ==
Legend
GP	Games played	GS	Games started	MPG	Minutes per game
FG%	Field goal percentage	3P%	3-point field goal percentage	FT%	Free throw percentage
RPG	Rebounds per game	APG	Assists per game	SPG	Steals per game
BPG	Blocks per game	PPG	Points per game	**Bold**	Career high

=== NBA ===
==== Regular season ====
Year	Team	GP	GS	MPG	FG%	3P%	FT%	RPG	APG	SPG	BPG	PPG
2012–13	Toronto	73	2	17.0	.407	.332	.714	2.0	.7	.6	.2	6.4
2013–14	Toronto	81	**62**	26.7	.423	**.395**	.837	3.1	1.0	.8	.3	10.9
2014–15	Toronto	**82**	61	25.5	.410	.372	.786	2.8	1.0	.6	.3	9.8
2015–16	Toronto	73	7	23.9	.431	.386	.790	2.5	.8	.7	.3	9.9
2016–17	Toronto	54	0	22.4	**.441**	.375	.820	2.6	.8	1.0	.4	10.4
2016–17	Orlando	24	24	**31.2**	.431	.341	.852	2.8	1.8	**1.4**	**.5**	12.5
2017–18	Orlando	24	20	25.0	.398	.323	.750	3.0	1.6	1.1	**.5**	8.7
2018–19	Orlando	81	0	26.5	.428	.383	**.875**	**3.5**	1.7	.9	.4	15.1
2019–20	Orlando	69	0	27.4	.403	.351	.853	3.2	1.2	1.1	.3	14.7
2020–21	Orlando	46	2	29.3	.412	.337	.870	3.4	**2.3**	1.0	**.5**	**15.6**
2021–22	Orlando	63	0	23.0	.397	.292	.862	2.6	1.8	.4	.2	10.0
2022–23	Orlando	42	9	22.5	.431	.381	.750	2.0	1.3	.6	.2	8.0
2022–23	Phoenix	21	0	18.4	.428	.347	.857	3.3	2.0	.5	.1	9.0
Career		733	187	24.5	.418	.362	.837	2.8	1.3	.8	.3	11.0

==== Playoffs ====
Year	Team	GP	GS	MPG	FG%	3P%	FT%	RPG	APG	SPG	BPG	PPG
2014	Toronto	7	**7**	22.6	.298	.167	.600	2.0	.3	.9	.4	5.0
2015	Toronto	4	4	26.8	.379	.333	—	1.5	1.0	.8	**1.0**	7.0
2016	Toronto	**20**	0	16.8	.387	.328	.650	1.6	.6	.7	.3	6.3
2019	Orlando	5	0	**29.2**	.370	**.343**	.824	3.6	**1.4**	**1.2**	.4	13.2
2020	Orlando	5	0	27.0	**.469**	.333	**.857**	**4.4**	1.0	.8	.2	**16.4**
2023	Phoenix	6	0	11.5	.296	.273	—	1.3	.2	.2	.3	3.7
Career		47	11	20.2	.379	.306	.750	2.1	.6	.7	.4	7.6

=== College ===
Year	Team	GP	GS	MPG	FG%	3P%	FT%	RPG	APG	SPG	BPG	PPG
2010–11	Washington	34	4	17.4	.443	.352	.758	2.8	1.0	.6	.4	8.0
2011–12	Washington	**35**	**35**	**31.1**	**.457**	**.371**	**.766**	**6.4**	**1.4**	**1.3**	**.9**	**16.4**
Career		69	39	24.4	.453	.364	.764	4.7	1.2	.9	.7	12.3

== Personal life ==
Ross and his wife, Matijana, have two children.

Ross' sister, Taelor, played college basketball for Seattle University.

Ross briefly dated model Amber Rose in 2016.
