= Graham Betchart =

American psychologist

- Born: April 30, 1978 (age 47)
- Scientific career
- Fields: Sport psychology, sports coaching

Graham Betchart (born April 30, 1978) is a mental skills coach for the Sacramento Kings of the National Basketball Association (NBA). He is known for the concept "Play Present," which teaches that an athlete needs to stay focused on the task at hand and immediately move on to the next play despite results or outcomes. He is also noted for the "MVP" program (Mediate, Visualize, Positive affirmation), a sports psychology mental training tool, as well as "WIN" (What is Important Now), which asserts that a player can only control attitude, effort, and focus.
