= Aaron Gordon =

American basketball player (born 1995)

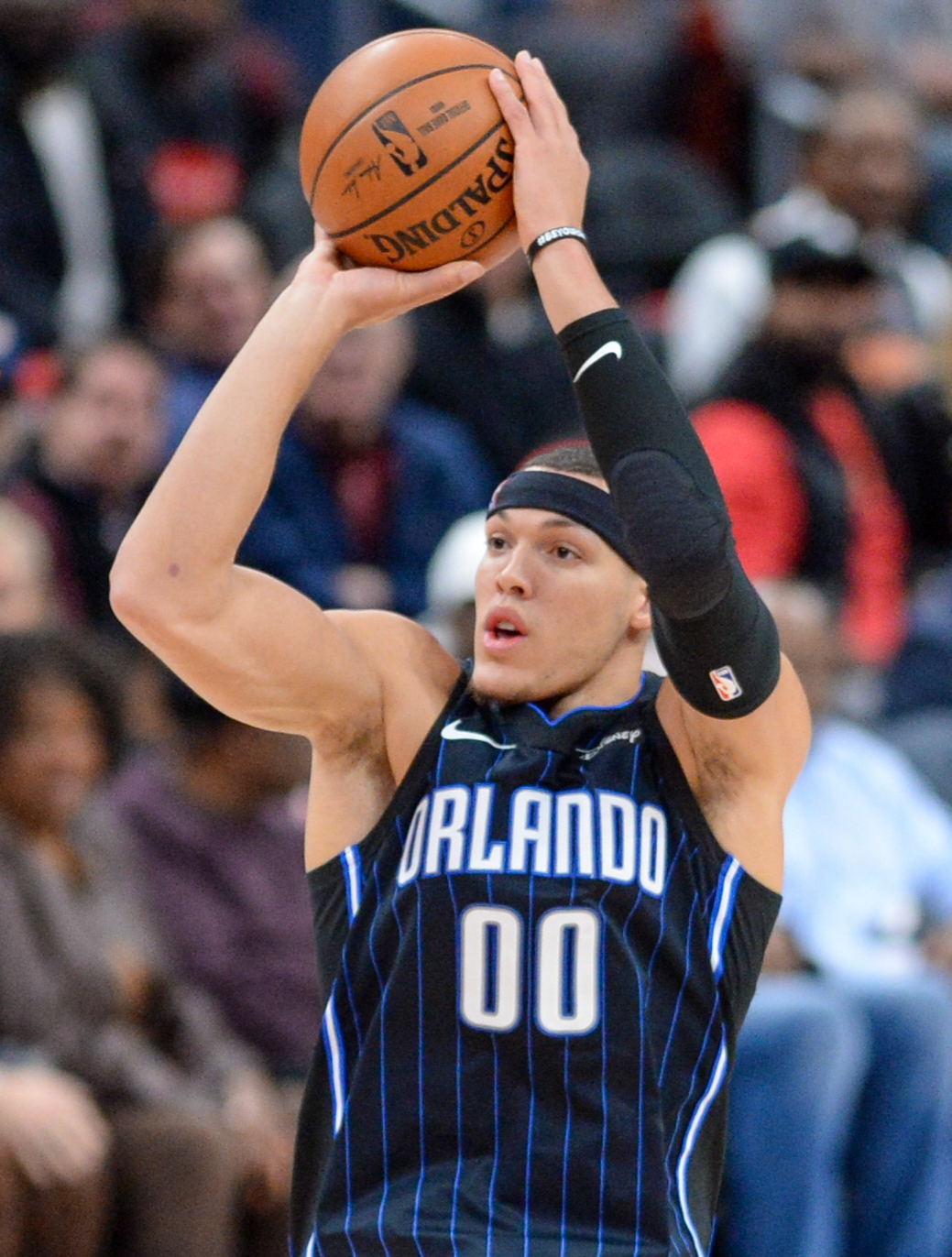
- Gordon with the Orlando Magic in 2019

No. 32 – Denver Nuggets
- Position: Power forward / small forward
- League: NBA

Personal information
- Born: September 16, 1995 (age 31) San Jose, California, U.S.
- Listed height: 6 ft 8 in (2.03 m)
- Listed weight: 235 lb (107 kg)

Career information
- High school: Archbishop Mitty (San Jose, California)
- College: Arizona (2013–2014)
- NBA draft: 2014: 1st round, 4th overall pick
- Drafted by: Orlando Magic
- Playing career: 2014–present

Career history
- 2014–2021: Orlando Magic
- 2021–present: Denver Nuggets

Career highlights
- NBA champion (2023); Third-team All-American – SN (2014); First-team All-Pac-12 (2014); Pac-12 Freshman of the Year (2014); McDonald's All-American Game MVP (2013); First-team Parade All-American (2013); 2× California Mr. Basketball (2012, 2013); USA Basketball Male Athlete of the Year (2013); FIBA Under-19 World Cup MVP (2013)
- Stats at NBA.com
- Stats at Basketball Reference
Medals
Men's basketball
Representing the United States
FIBA World U19 Cup
Gold medal – first place	2013 Czech Republic	U.S. National team

Aaron Addison Gordon (born September 16, 1995) is an American professional basketball player for the Denver Nuggets of the National Basketball Association (NBA). Born in San Jose, California, Gordon attended Archbishop Mitty High School where he led his team to two state championships and was named California Mr. Basketball in his junior and senior years. Gordon then played one year of college basketball with the Arizona Wildcats, during which they won the Pac-12 regular season title and reached the Elite Eight of the 2014 NCAA tournament.

Gordon was selected by the Orlando Magic as the fourth overall pick in the 2014 NBA draft. Gordon has twice been a runner-up in the NBA Slam Dunk Contest, losing close matchups to Zach LaVine in 2016 and Derrick Jones Jr. in 2020. After being traded to the Nuggets in 2021, Gordon won his first NBA championship in 2023.

== Early life ==
Gordon was born in San Jose, California, to former San Diego State basketball player Ed Gordon and Shelly Davis Gordon. Gordon has claimed that his paternal great-great-grandfather was a 7-foot-tall (2.1 m) Osage Indian. His father is black and his mother is white. After going undrafted by the NBA, Gordon's father tried out as a tight end for the National Football League's New England Patriots with no prior football experience. After being cut in the preseason, he played a year of pro basketball in Mexico. Gordon's older brother, Drew, also became a pro basketball player while his older sister, Elise, played collegiately for the Harvard women's basketball team.

Gordon attended Archbishop Mitty High School in San Jose. As a freshman in 2009–10, Gordon started in 28 of 41 games and averaged 11.8 points, 10.1 rebounds and 2.1 blocks per game. He also competed on the school's track and field team as a thrower and played summer basketball for the Oakland Soldiers.

As a sophomore in 2010–11, Gordon helped his team win the CIF Division II title which was Mitty's first state title in boys' basketball. Mitty finished with a 32–2 record with Gordon playing all 34 games, averaging 16.4 points, 12.5 rebounds and 3.6 blocks per game. In the 2011 title game, Gordon scored 17 points and broke the state championship record by gathering 21 rebounds.

As a junior in 2011–12, Gordon led his team to their second CIF Division II state title after defeating La Costa Canyon 78–57 in the finals. Gordon finished the game with 33 points and 20 rebounds. For the season, Gordon averaged 22.9 points, 12.8 rebounds, 2.6 assists and 2.3 blocks per game and was chosen as the California Mr. Basketball Player of the Year.

As a senior in 2012–13, Gordon averaged 21.6 points, 15.7 rebounds and 3.3 blocks per game and lead Archbishop Mitty to a 28–6 record. With this record, Archbishop Mitty reached the CIF Open Division finals where they lost against Mater Dei High School 50–45 with Gordon finishing the game with 22 points and 20 rebounds. Gordon was again chosen as the California Mr. Basketball Player of the year during his senior year.

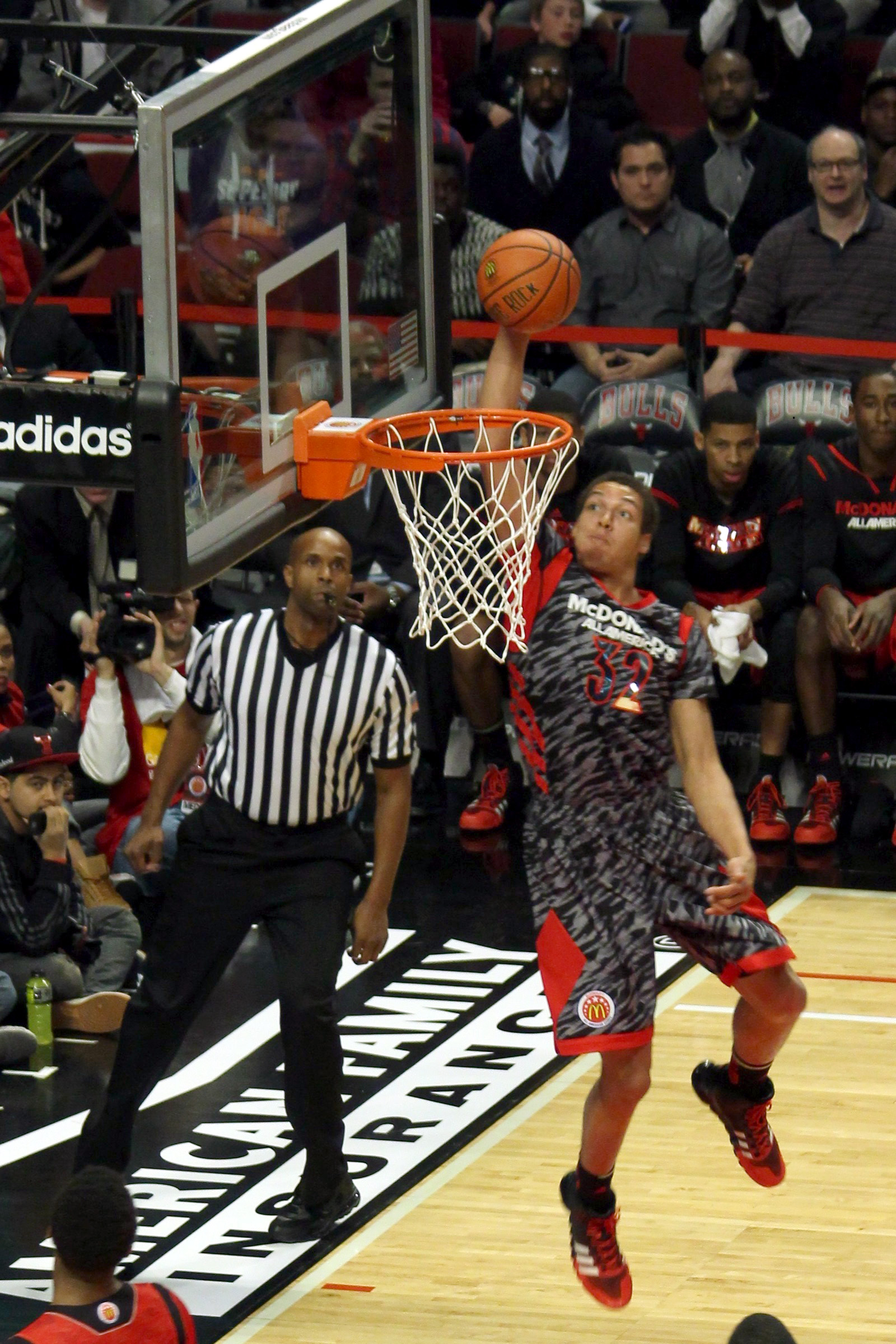
Gordon completing an alley oop at the 2013 McDonald's All-American Boys Game

Gordon committed to the University of Arizona on April 2, 2013, announcing his decision in a news conference before the 2013 McDonald's All-American Game. After a 24-point, 8-rebound performance leading the West to a 110–99 victory, Gordon was named the game's MVP.

On January 17, 2020, Archbishop Mitty retired Gordon's number 32.

College recruiting
Name	Hometown	School	Height	Weight	Commit date
Aaron Gordon; F	San Jose, CA	Archbishop Mitty High School	6 ft 9 in (2.06 m)	210 lb (95 kg)	Apr 2, 2013
Aaron Gordon; F	Recruit ratings: Scout: Rivals: (96)				
Overall recruit ranking: Scout: #4 Rivals: #3 ESPN: #4
Note: In many cases, Scout, Rivals, 247Sports, On3, and ESPN may conflict in their listings of height and weight.; In these cases, the average was taken. ESPN grades are on a 100-point scale.; Sources: "2013 Arizona Basketball Commits". Scout.; "ESPN". ESPN.; "Scout.com Team Recruiting Rankings". Scout.; "2013 Team Ranking". Rivals.

== College career ==
Gordon made his college debut for the Arizona Wildcats on November 8, 2013, in a 73–62 win against Cal Poly in which he recorded 13 points, 10 rebounds and 4 blocks while seeing 33 minutes of play. On February 22, 2014, Gordon scored a season-high, and game-high, 23 points in a win against Colorado scoring 21 points in the second half. On March 2, 2014, Gordon led his team to a Pac-12 regular season title after a 79–66 victory over Stanford where he scored 19 points and achieved a career-high 15 rebounds. On March 8, 2014, in the final game of the regular season, Gordon contributed 21 points in a 64–47 win against Oregon finishing the season with a 28–3 record. on March 13, 2014, during the 2014 Pac-12 tournament, Arizona defeated Utah in the quarterfinals 71–39 with Gordon scoring 11 points and grabbing 7 rebounds. On March 14, 2014, Gordon led his team to a 63-43 semifinal victory against Colorado during which Gordon scored 9 points and grabbed 9 rebounds. Arizona ultimately lost in the finals of the tournament to UCLA 71–75 with Gordon scoring 11 points.

In the 2014 NCAA tournament Gordon scored 16 points in a 68–59 victory over Weber State Arizona advanced to the Sweet 16 after defeating Gonzaga 84–61 with Gordon adding 18 points, 6 rebounds and 6 assists. Gordon scored 15 points in his team's 70–64 win against San Diego State before ultimately dropping out of the tournament in a close loss (63–64) to Wisconsin in the Elite Eight. Gordon scored 8 points and grabbed 18 rebounds.

On February 13, 2014, Gordon was named one of the 30 finalists for the Naismith College Player of the Year. He was named to the All-Pac-12 first team, as well as earning Pac-12 Freshman of the Year and Pac-12 All-Freshman team honors. Gordon finished his freshman year with a record-breaking 303 rebounds and on April 15, 2014, he declared for the NBA draft, forgoing his final three years of college eligibility.

== Professional career ==
=== Orlando Magic (2014–2021) ===
==== 2014–15 season ====
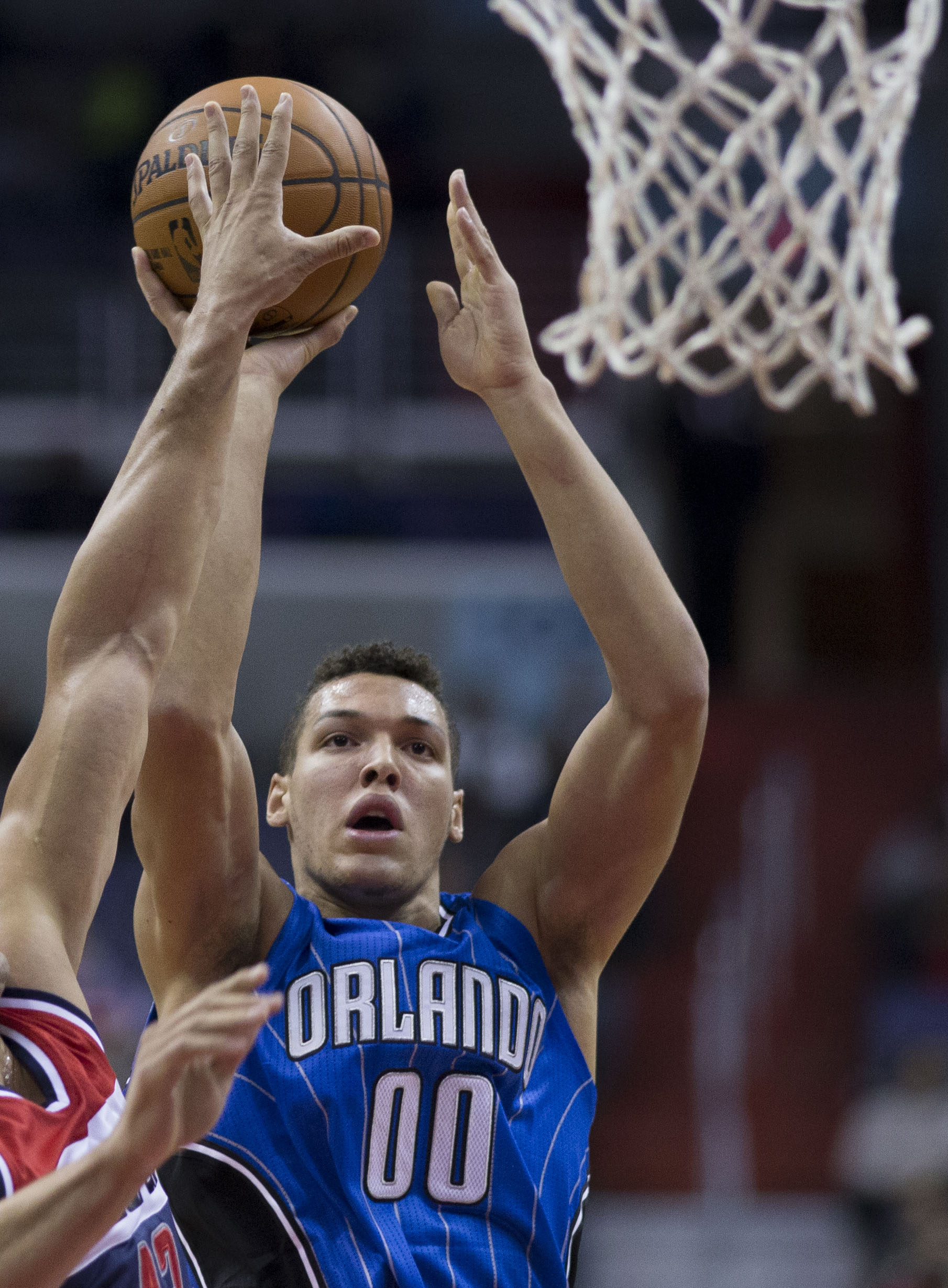
Gordon with the Magic in 2014

On June 26, 2014, Gordon was selected with the fourth overall pick in the 2014 NBA draft by the Orlando Magic. On July 2, he signed with the Magic and joined them for the 2014 NBA Summer League. After appearing in the first 11 games of the 2014–15 season, Gordon was ruled out indefinitely on November 16 after he fractured a bone in his left foot in the Magic's loss to the Washington Wizards the night before. He returned to action on January 18, 2015, against the Oklahoma City Thunder after missing 32 games. On April 4, he recorded his first career double-double with 10 points and 12 rebounds in a 97–90 win over the Milwaukee Bucks.

==== 2015–16 season ====
In July 2015, Gordon re-joined the Magic for the 2015 NBA Summer League, where he averaged 21.7 points, 11.7 rebounds, 2.7 assists, 1.3 steals and 1.7 blocks in three games. On November 4, 2015, he scored a then career-high 19 points in a loss to the Houston Rockets. On January 31, 2016, he tied his then career high of 19 points and grabbed 14 rebounds in a 119–114 win over the Boston Celtics. He went on to record 12 points and a career-high 16 rebounds the following night against the San Antonio Spurs. During the 2016 NBA All-Star Weekend, Gordon was the runner-up to Zach LaVine in the Slam Dunk Contest. Their battle through two tie-breakers in the final round drew comparisons to the showdown between Michael Jordan and Dominique Wilkins in 1988. Gordon utilised Stuff the Magic Dragon, his team's 6½-ft tall mascot, in his dunks; his final dunk involved him jumping over Stuff while passing the ball under both legs. On February 25, he had another 19-point outing in a 130–114 loss to the Golden State Warriors. Three days later, he set a then career high with 22 points in a 130–116 win over the Philadelphia 76ers. On April 13, in the Magic's season finale, Gordon tied his then career high of 22 points in a 117–103 loss to the Charlotte Hornets.

==== 2016–17 season ====
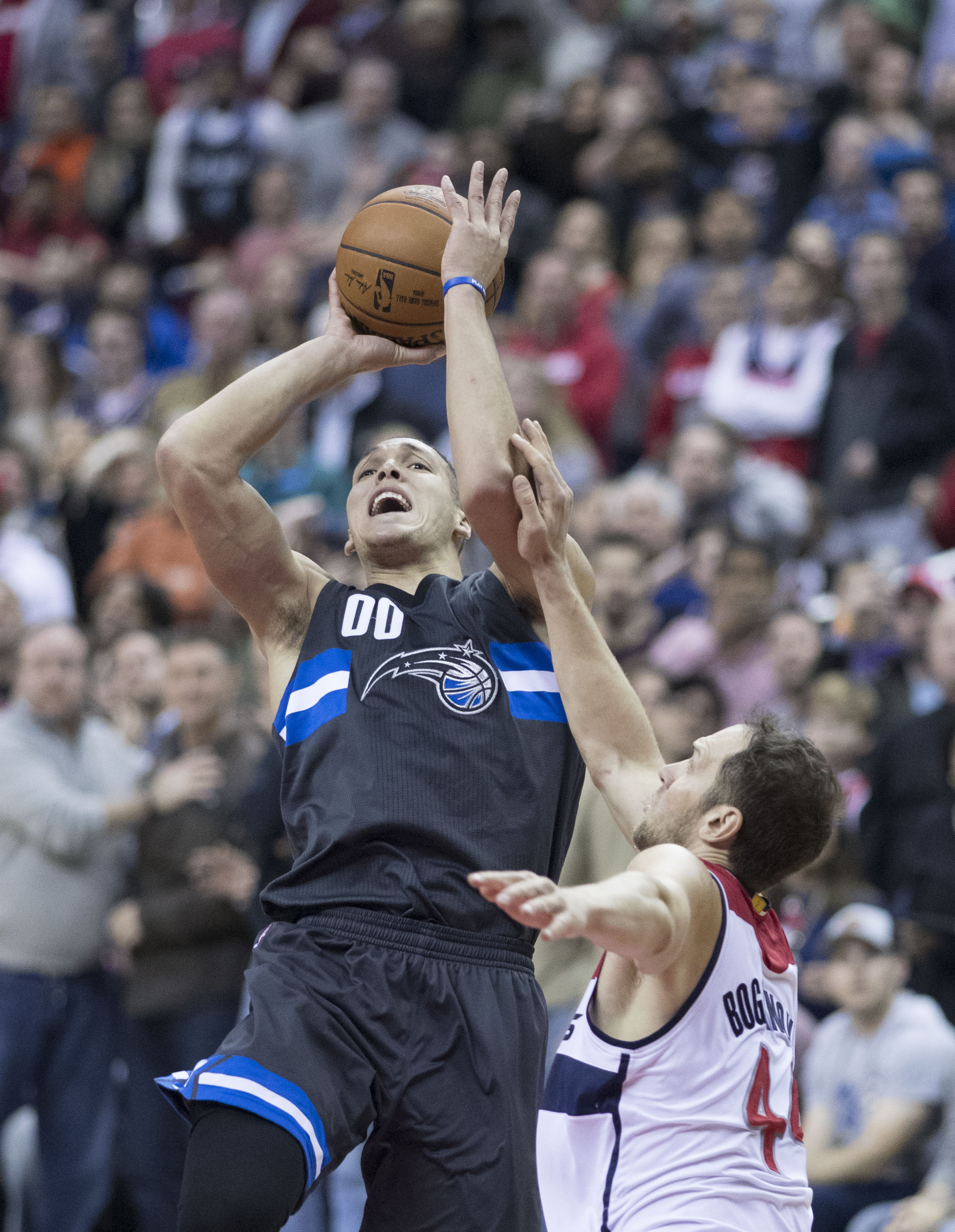
Gordon with the Magic in March 2017

On December 14, 2016, Gordon scored a then career-high 33 points in a 113–108 loss to the Los Angeles Clippers. On February 18, 2017, he participated in his second consecutive Slam Dunk Contest, but failed to make it past the first round. On March 31, 2017, he scored 20 of his 32 points in the first half of the Magic's 117–116 loss to the Boston Celtics. He also had 16 rebounds in the game. In the Magic's season finale on April 12, Gordon had 32 points and 12 rebounds in a 113–109 win over the Detroit Pistons.

==== 2017–18 season ====
On October 24, 2017, Gordon scored a then career-high 41 points, including the go-ahead 3-pointer with 36 seconds remaining, to lift the Magic to a 125–121 win over the Brooklyn Nets. On November 29, 2017, he had 40 points and 15 rebounds to help Orlando end a nine-game losing streak with a 121–108 win over the Oklahoma City Thunder. On December 30, 2017, he had a 39-point effort in a 117–111 loss to the Miami Heat. Gordon missed nine games in February, including the All-Star Slam Dunk contest, with a strained left hip flexor. On March 24, 2018, he had 29 points, 11 rebounds and a then career-high eight assists in a 105–99 win over the Phoenix Suns.

==== 2018–19 season ====
On July 6, 2018, Gordon re-signed with the Magic on a four-year, $80 million contract. In the Magic's season opener on October 17, Gordon had 26 points and 16 rebounds in a 104–101 win over the Miami Heat. On November 18, he scored 20 of his 31 points in the first quarter of the Magic's 131–117 win over the New York Knicks. On January 2, 2019, Gordon had a then career-high nine assists in a 112–84 win over the Chicago Bulls. Thanks to a 42–40 record, the Magic qualified for the postseason for the first time since 2012 and faced the Toronto Raptors during their first round series. On April 13, 2019, Gordon made his playoff debut, recording ten points, ten rebounds, three assists and three steals in a 104–101 Game 1 win. The Magic ended up losing the series in five games, as the Raptors went on to win the NBA Finals.

==== 2019–20 season ====
On December 4, 2019, Gordon scored a season-high 32 points, alongside five rebounds and five assists, in a 128–114 win over the Phoenix Suns. Gordon was runner-up in the Slam Dunk Contest to Derrick Jones Jr. during the 2020 NBA All-Star Weekend. They both had perfect scores in their first two dunks in the second round, forcing an overtime round. After they both earned perfect scores on their initial dunks, Jones won by scoring a 48 after taking off just past the free throw line to complete a windmill dunk; Gordon received a 47 after dunking over 7-foot-5-inch (2.26 m) Tacko Fall. On February 28, Gordon recorded his first career triple-double with 17 points, 11 rebounds and 12 assists in a 136–125 win over the Minnesota Timberwolves. Despite the Magic qualifying for the playoffs for a second straight season, Gordon did not play in the team's first round series due to a hamstring injury he suffered in the NBA Bubble. The Magic were eliminated by the Milwaukee Bucks in the first round of the playoffs.

==== 2020–21 season ====
On March 19, 2021, Gordon posted a season-high 38 points, 6 rebounds and 4 assists in a 121–113 victory against the Brooklyn Nets, ending the Magics' nine-game losing streak and stopping the Nets' winning streak at six games. In his efforts, Gordon knocked down a career-high seven 3-pointers. On March 22, it was reported that Gordon had requested a trade from the Magic.

=== Denver Nuggets (2021–present) ===
==== 2020–21 season ====
On March 25, 2021, Gordon and Gary Clark were traded to the Denver Nuggets in exchange for Gary Harris, R. J. Hampton, and a future first-round pick. Gordon had played and started in 25 games and was averaging 14.6 points, 6.6 rebounds and 4.2 assists in 29 minutes of action while shooting 37.5% from three-point range with the Magic for the season. On March 28, he made his Nuggets debut in a 126–102 win against the Atlanta Hawks, logging 13 points and two rebounds in 21 minutes of action. The Nuggets qualified for the playoffs, but they lost in four games to the Phoenix Suns during the Western Conference Semifinals.

==== 2021–22 season ====
On September 27, 2021, Gordon signed a four-year, $92 million extension through the 2025–26 season. On January 11, 2022, Gordon scored a season-high 30 points, alongside 12 rebounds, in a 85–87 loss to the Los Angeles Clippers. During the first round of the playoffs, the Nuggets lost in five games to the eventual champions, the Golden State Warriors.

==== 2022–23 season ====
During the 2022–23 season, Gordon was discussed as a potential NBA All-Star selection. However, he ultimately wasn't selected. In Game 1 of the Western Conference Semifinals, Gordon scored 23 points on 9-of-13 shooting, 3-of-4 from three, 2-of-2 from the free throw line in a 125–107 win over the Phoenix Suns. In Game 4 of the 2023 NBA Finals, Gordon scored a then playoff career-high 27 points on 11-of-15 shooting in a 108–95 victory over the Miami Heat. The Nuggets went on to win 94–89 in Game 5 to make Gordon an NBA champion. Just hours after the victory, Gordon was seen celebrating with fans in the streets of downtown Denver just miles away from Ball Arena, and walked with many for several blocks.

==== 2023–24 season ====
The following season saw him miss multiple games after being bitten by a dog in his face and hands. In Game 3 of the Nuggets' first round playoffs series against the Los Angeles Lakers, Gordon posted playoff career-highs with 29 points and 15 rebounds in a 112–105 win. In Game 4 of the Western Conference Semifinals against the Minnesota Timberwolves, Gordon logged 27 points on 11-for-12 shooting, two shy of matching his playoff career-high, alongside six rebounds and six assists, in a winning effort. Denver would go on to lose to Minnesota in seven games.

==== 2024–25 season ====
Prior to the 2024–25 season, Gordon switched his jersey number from 50 to 32 to honor his late older brother Drew Gordon, who wore No. 32 before he died in a May 2024 car accident. On October 21, 2024, Gordon and the Nuggets agreed to a four–year, $133 million contract extension.

On March 7, 2025, Gordon made a career-high seven 3-pointers and had 27 points in a 149–141 overtime win over the Phoenix Suns. On April 26, Gordon scored 14 points and a game-winning, buzzer-beating dunk, the first in NBA playoff history, in a 101–99 victory against the Los Angeles Clippers in Game 4 of the first round. On May 5, he logged a double-double of 22 points and 14 rebounds, and hit the game-winning three-pointer, in a 121–119 victory against the Oklahoma City Thunder in Game 1 of the second round. On May 9, Gordon had 22 points, including a game-tying three late in regulation, allowing the Nuggets to go up 2–1 in their series. Despite his clutch efforts, Denver ultimately lost the series to Oklahoma in seven games.

==== 2025–26 season ====
On October 23, 2025, Gordon put up a career-high 50 points on 10-of-11 three-point shooting in a 137–131 overtime loss to the Golden State Warriors. His 10 three-pointers made tied Terry Rozier's record for the most three-pointers made in a season-opening game and his 50 points surpassed Alex English's previous record (47) for the most points in a season-opening game in Nuggets franchise history. On November 23, Gordon was ruled out for 4-to-6 weeks after being diagnosed with a Grade 2 right hamstring strain. On January 29, 2026, Gordon was ruled out for another 4-to-6 weeks after re-injuring the hamstring in a game against the Milwaukee Bucks. He returned to action on March 6, recording three points, three rebounds, and three assists in a loss to the New York Knicks.

== National team career ==
Gordon led Team USA to the 2011 FIBA Americas Under-16 Championship gold medal, with team-highs of 17.0 points, 11.2 rebounds and 3.2 blocks per game. He went on to earn MVP honors, while leading the United States to a gold medal at the 2013 FIBA Under-19 World Cup, in Prague, where he averaged team highs of 16.2 points and 6.2 rebounds per game, in addition to shooting 61.2 percent from the field. He was also named to the 2011–12 USA Developmental National Team, and participated at the 2010 USA Basketball Developmental National Team mini-camp.

== Off the court ==
In 2016, Gordon was appointed president of athlete acquisition for Lucid, a sports psychology app developed by mental skills coach Graham Betchart.

In 2020, Gordon signed a partnership agreement with Chinese sports brand 361 Degrees. The same year, Gordon donated to the Homeless Education Fund at the Foundation for Orange County Public Schools of Florida. The goal of the Fund was to help children who were adversely affected by school districts canceling classes during the coronavirus pandemic.

In 2018, Gordon made his acting debut as Casper in Uncle Drew. In 2020, he released a single "Pull Up" with rap artist Moe.

== Career statistics ==
Legend
GP	Games played	GS	Games started	MPG	Minutes per game
FG%	Field goal percentage	3P%	3-point field goal percentage	FT%	Free throw percentage
RPG	Rebounds per game	APG	Assists per game	SPG	Steals per game
BPG	Blocks per game	PPG	Points per game	**Bold**	Career high
†	Won an NBA championship

=== NBA ===
==== Regular season ====
Year	Team	GP	GS	MPG	FG%	3P%	FT%	RPG	APG	SPG	BPG	PPG
2014–15	Orlando	47	8	17.0	.447	.271	.721	3.6	.7	.4	.5	5.2
2015–16	Orlando	78	37	23.9	.473	.296	.668	6.5	1.6	.8	.7	9.2
2016–17	Orlando	**80**	72	28.7	.454	.288	.719	5.1	1.9	.8	.5	12.7
2017–18	Orlando	58	57	32.9	.434	.336	.698	**7.9**	2.3	**1.0**	**.8**	**17.6**
2018–19	Orlando	78	**78**	**33.8**	.449	.349	.731	7.4	3.7	.7	.7	16.0
2019–20	Orlando	62	62	32.5	.437	.308	.674	7.7	3.7	.8	.6	14.4
2020–21	Orlando	25	25	29.4	.437	.375	.629	6.6	**4.2**	.6	**.8**	14.6
2020–21	Denver	25	25	25.9	.500	.266	.705	4.7	2.2	.7	.6	10.2
2021–22	Denver	75	75	31.7	.520	.335	.743	5.9	2.5	.6	.6	15.0
2022–23^{†}	Denver	68	68	30.2	**.564**	.347	.608	6.6	3.0	.8	**.8**	16.3
2023–24	Denver	73	73	31.5	.556	.290	.658	6.5	3.5	.8	.6	13.9
2024–25	Denver	51	42	28.4	.531	**.436**	**.810**	4.8	3.2	.5	.3	14.7
2025–26	Denver	36	33	27.9	.497	.389	.767	5.8	2.7	.6	.3	16.2
Career		756	655	29.2	.485	.335	.698	6.2	2.7	.7	.6	13.7

==== Playoffs ====
Year	Team	GP	GS	MPG	FG%	3P%	FT%	RPG	APG	SPG	BPG	PPG
2019	Orlando	5	5	32.8	.468	.400	.526	7.2	3.6	**1.2**	.2	15.2
2021	Denver	10	10	29.9	.434	.391	.640	5.4	2.0	.5	.3	11.1
2022	Denver	5	5	32.0	.426	.200	.714	7.2	2.6	.4	**1.2**	13.8
2023^{†}	Denver	**20**	**20**	35.6	.518	.391	.652	6.0	2.6	.6	.7	13.3
2024	Denver	12	12	37.1	**.585**	**.407**	.821	7.3	**4.4**	.8	.6	14.3
2025	Denver	14	14	**37.3**	.485	.379	**.860**	**7.6**	2.7	.6	.4	**16.2**
2026	Denver	3	3	29.7	.400	.214	.700	5.3	2.3	.0	.3	11.3
Career		69	69	34.7	.494	.365	.716	6.6	2.9	.6	.5	13.8

=== College ===
Year	Team	GP	GS	MPG	FG%	3P%	FT%	RPG	APG	SPG	BPG	PPG
2013–14	Arizona	38	38	31.2	.495	.356	.422	8.0	2.0	.9	1.0	12.4

== Awards and honors ==
High school

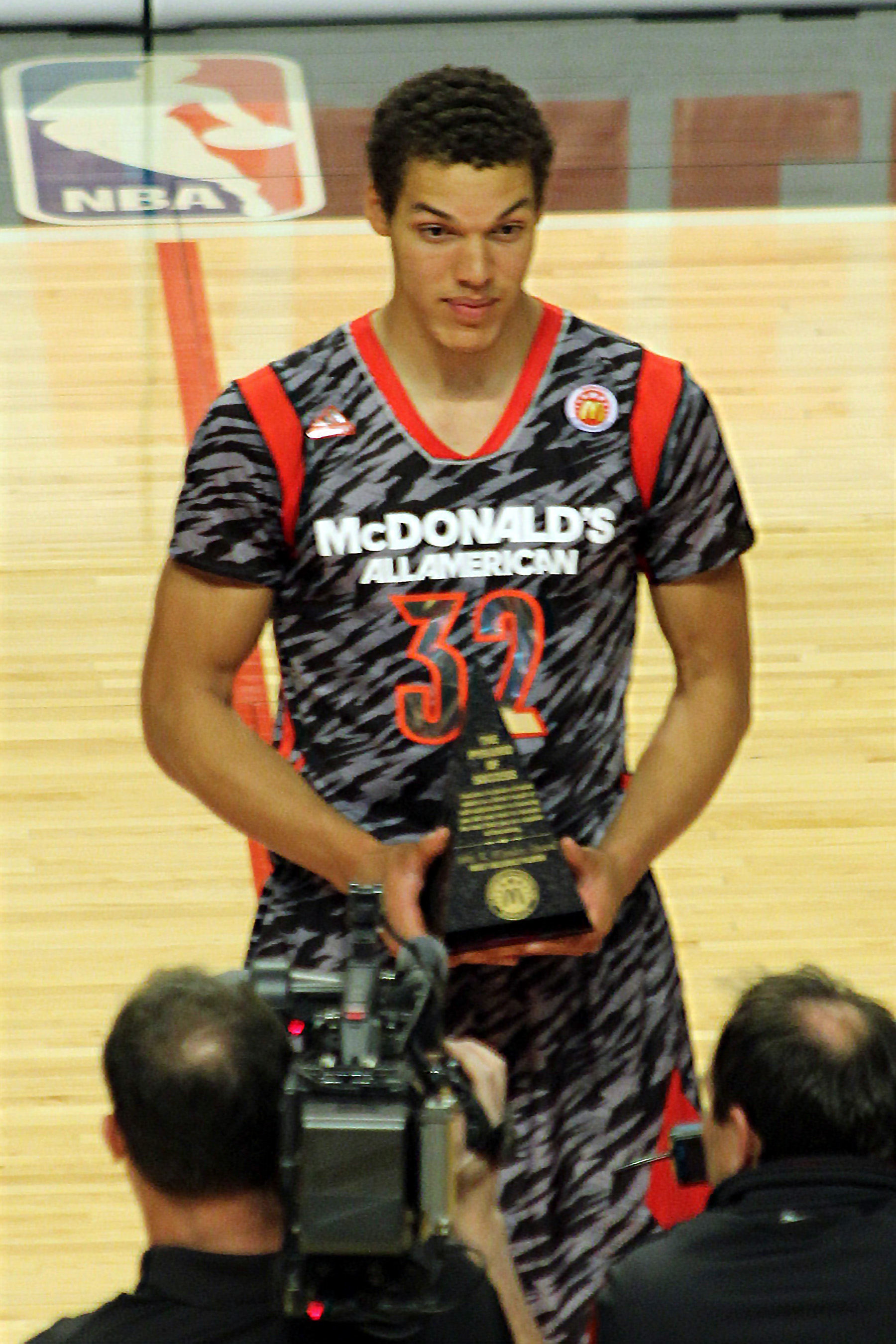
Gordon was MVP of the 2013 McDonald's All-American Boys Game.

- 2013: USA Basketball Male Athlete of the Year
- 2013: FIBA Under-19 World Cup MVP
- 2013: McDonald's All-American Game MVP
- Jordan Brand All-American (2013)
- 2× California Mr. Basketball (2012, 2013)
- 2× CIF State champion (2011, 2012)
- 2× CIF State Division II champion (2011, 2012)
- 3× CIF Northern California champion (2011–2013)
- CIF Northern California Open Division champion (2013)
- 2× CIF Northern California Division II champion (2011, 2012)
- 4× CIF CCS champion (2010–2013)
- CIF CCS Open Division champion (2013)
- 3× CIF CCS Division II champion (2010–2012)
- MaxPreps.com All-American First Team (2013)
- San Jose Mercury News Player of the Year (2013)
- San Jose Mercury News First Team (2013)
- Cal-Hi Sports Bay Area CCS Player of the Year (2013)
- 3× WCAL champion (2011–2013)
- 3× Ed Fennelly WCAL Player of the Year Award (2011–2013)
- 3× All-WCAL First Team (2011–2013)
- All-WCAL Second Team (2010)

College

- Pac-12 Freshman Student-Athlete of the Year (2014)
- Pac-12 All-Tournament Team (2014)
- AP Honorable Mention (2014)
- NCAA tournament's West Regional All-Tournament Team (2014)
- Third team All-America – Sporting News (2014)
- USBWA All-District Team (2014)
- NABC All-District Second Team (2014)
- All-Pac-12 First Team (2014)
- Pac-12 All-Freshman Team (2014)
- Pac-12 Freshman of the Year (2014)
- Pac-12 All-Rookie First Team (2014)
