= Melvin Frazier =

American basketball player (born 1996)

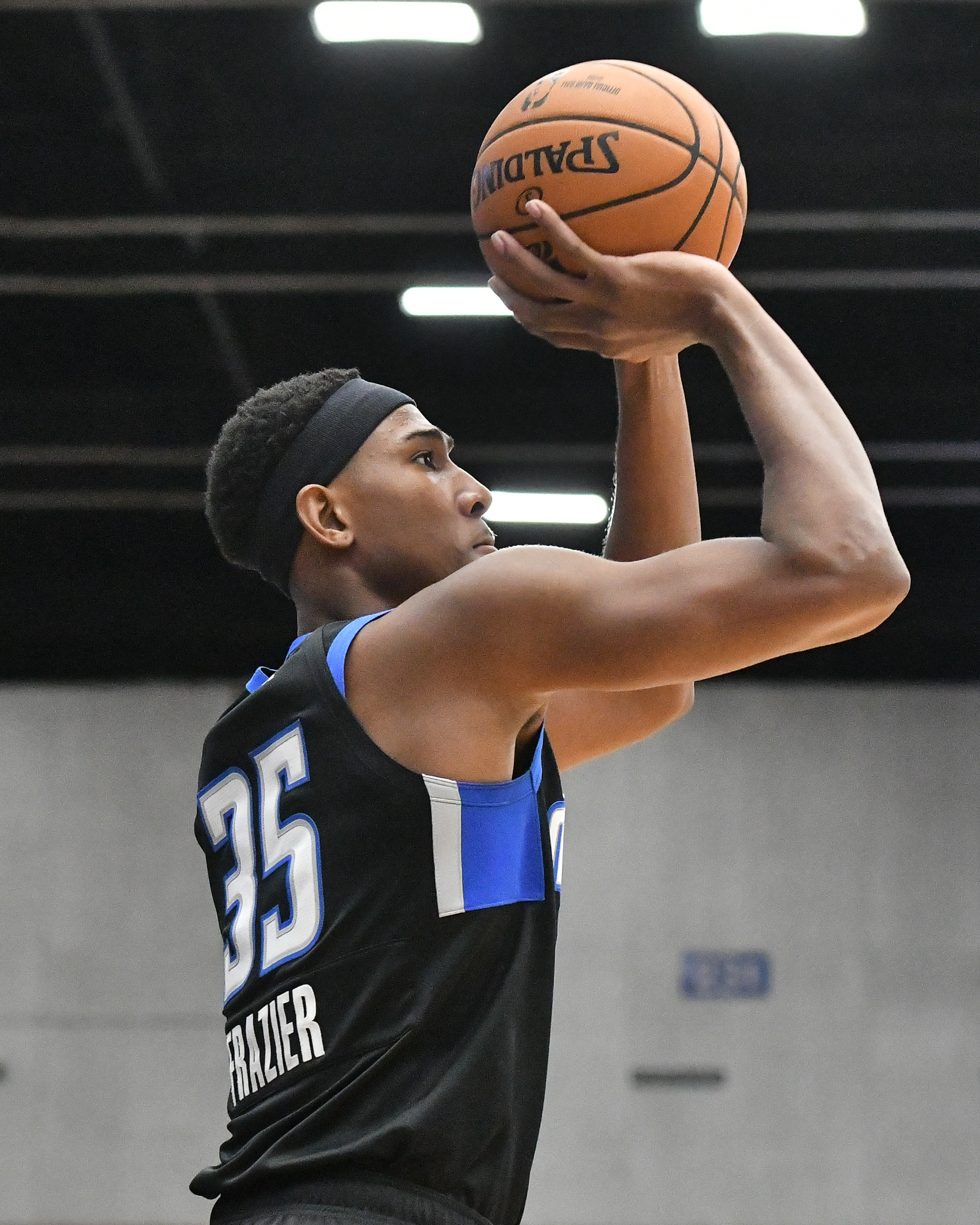

No. 55 – Jiangxi Ganchi
- Position: Shooting guard / small forward
- League: National Basketball League

Personal information
- Born: August 30, 1996 (age 30) New Orleans, Louisiana, U.S.
- Listed height: 6 ft 5 in (1.96 m)
- Listed weight: 215 lb (98 kg)

Career information
- High school: L. W. Higgins (Marrero, Louisiana)
- College: Tulane (2015–2018)
- NBA draft: 2018: 2nd round, 35th overall pick
- Drafted by: Orlando Magic
- Playing career: 2018–present

Career history
- 2018–2020: Orlando Magic
- 2018–2020: →Lakeland Magic
- 2021–2022: Oklahoma City Blue
- 2022: Iowa Wolves
- 2022: Oklahoma City Thunder
- 2022: →Oklahoma City Blue
- 2022: Raptors 905
- 2022–2023: Westchester Knicks
- 2023–2024: Delaware Blue Coats
- 2024: Al-Ahly Ly
- 2025–present: Jiangxi Ganchi

Career highlights
- Second-team All-AAC (2018); AAC Most Improved Player (2018)
- Stats at NBA.com
- Stats at Basketball Reference

Melvin Jamon Frazier Jr. (born August 30, 1996) is an American professional basketball player for Al-Ahly Ly of the Libyan Division I Basketball League (LBL) and the Basketball Africa League (BAL). He played college basketball for the Tulane Green Wave.

== Early life ==
Frazier attended L. W. Higgins High School. He played AAU basketball for Team NOLA and Wings Elite, where he was a defensive force but secondary scorer to Marlain Veal. Frazier was ranked the fourth best prospect in Louisiana by The Times-Picayune as a senior. He chose Tulane over offers from Arkansas, Oklahoma and Oklahoma State.

== College career ==
Frazier was coach Ed Conroy's highest-rated recruit but had a relatively quiet freshman season, averaging 5.2 points per game. When Mike Dunleavy Sr. arrived as coach in his sophomore season, he worked to improve Frazier's shooting mechanics and dribbling skills. Frazier averaged 11.5 points per game as a sophomore. He was named AAC player of the week for the first time on November 20, 2017. As a junior, Frazier had 10 games where he scored at least 20 points, including a career-high 28 points against Memphis. He sustaining a chest contusion early in the game against Temple on February 4 and missed a game. Frazier was named to the Second Team All-AAC as well as the Most Improved Player. He averaged 15.9 points, 5.5 rebounds, and 2.1 steals per game as a junior, while shooting 55.8 percent from the floor and 39 percent from behind the arc. After the season he declared for the 2018 NBA draft but did not immediately hire an agent. He was considered to be a borderline first round prospect. In May, Frazier signed with Thad Foucher of Wasserman Media Group, thus ending his collegiate eligibility.

== Professional career ==
On June 21, 2018, Frazier was drafted by the Orlando Magic with the 35th overall selection in the 2018 NBA draft. On July 6, 2018, the Magic announced that they had signed Frazier.

On December 3, 2020, Frazier signed with the Oklahoma City Thunder, but was waived three days later. He joined the Oklahoma City Blue in 2021.

On February 21, 2022, Frazier was traded to the Iowa Wolves in exchange for Robert Woodard II.

On April 6, 2022, Frazier signed a two-way contract with the Oklahoma City Thunder.

For the 2022–23 season, Frazier joined Raptors 905.

On December 28, 2022, Frazier was later traded to the Westchester Knicks in exchange for Jeremiah Tilmon.

On October 29, 2023, Frazier joined the Delaware Blue Coats.

On June 18, 2024, Frazier signed with Al-Ahly Ly of the Libyan Division I Basketball League.

== Career statistics ==
Legend
GP	Games played	GS	Games started	MPG	Minutes per game
FG%	Field goal percentage	3P%	3-point field goal percentage	FT%	Free throw percentage
RPG	Rebounds per game	APG	Assists per game	SPG	Steals per game
BPG	Blocks per game	PPG	Points per game	**Bold**	Career high

=== NBA ===
==== Regular season ====
Year	Team	GP	GS	MPG	FG%	3P%	FT%	RPG	APG	SPG	BPG	PPG
2018–19	Orlando	10	0	4.4	.333	.000	.250	.5	.1	.1	.0	1.5
2019–20	Orlando	**19**	0	6.6	**.441**	**.500**	.500	.5	.2	**.5**	**.1**	2.1
2021–22	Oklahoma City	3	0	**40.0**	.271	.048	**.714**	**4.3**	**.5**	.3	.0	**10.7**
Career		32	0	9.1	.340	.209	.533	.9	.2	.3	.1	2.7

==== Playoffs ====
Year	Team	GP	GS	MPG	FG%	3P%	FT%	RPG	APG	SPG	BPG	PPG
2019	Orlando	3	0	5.0	.400	–	.500	1.3	.0	.3	.0	1.7

=== College ===
Year	Team	GP	GS	MPG	FG%	3P%	FT%	RPG	APG	SPG	BPG	PPG
2015–16	Tulane	**34**	11	19.5	.401	.286	.516	3.1	.7	.9	.3	5.2
2016–17	Tulane	30	28	30.2	.438	.264	.667	4.6	1.5	1.9	.5	11.5
2017–18	Tulane	30	**30**	**34.4**	**.556**	**.385**	**.712**	**5.6**	**2.9**	**2.2**	**.7**	**15.9**
Career		94	69	27.7	.481	.312	.653	4.4	1.7	1.6	.5	10.6
