= 2018–19 Atlanta Hawks season =

Season of National Basketball Association team the Atlanta Hawks

- Head coach: Lloyd Pierce
- General manager: Travis Schlenk
- Owners: Tony Ressler
- Arena: State Farm Arena

Results
- Record: 29–53 (.354)
- Place: Division: 5th (Southeast); Conference: 12th (Eastern)
- Playoff finish: Did not qualify
- Stats at Basketball Reference

Local media
- Television: Fox Sports South
- Radio: 92.9 FM "The Game"

The 2018–19 Atlanta Hawks season was the 70th season of the franchise in the National Basketball Association (NBA) and the 51st in Atlanta. On April 25, 2018, the Hawks and Mike Budenholzer mutually agreed to part ways. On May 11, 2018, the Hawks hired Lloyd Pierce as head coach. Four days later, the Hawks won the #3 pick in the 2018 NBA draft (though they later traded down to #5 on the night of the draft), as well as enter draft night with four total draft picks over a month later in June.

During the offseason, the Hawks signed veteran Vince Carter, the 8th team that he has played for in his 21-year career. Carter signed with the Hawks despite massive speculation he would make a return to his two original teams; the Toronto Raptors (where Carter played his first 7 seasons with) or the Golden State Warriors (whom drafted Carter in 1998). This season also produced the team's highest scoring game with 161 points in a 168–161 quadruple overtime loss to the Chicago Bulls on March 1, 2019. It was also the third-highest scoring game in NBA history at the time, as well as the third game where both teams scoring broke through the 160-point barrier in the same game. However, this brought the Hawks to another losing season as they missed the playoffs for the second consecutive season after a loss to the Houston Rockets on March 19.

== Draft picks ==
Round	Pick	Player	Position	Nationality	College / Club
1	3	Luka Dončić	SG	Slovenia	(Spain) Real Madrid
1	19	Kevin Huerter	SF	United States	Maryland
1	30	Omari Spellman	PF	United States	Villanova
1	34	Devonte' Graham	PG	United States	Kansas

Entering draft night, the Hawks would have four draft picks, three of which being in the first round. Their first of three first-round picks rose up into the Top 3 of the NBA Draft after tying the Dallas Mavericks with the third-worst record of the season the previous season. The next first-round pick was trading Adreian Payne to the Minnesota Timberwolves in exchange for their lottery-protected first-round pick, which barely conveyed to them that season thanks to a do-or-die game at the end of that season against the Denver Nuggets. After that, their last first-round pick was trading with the Los Angeles Clippers and Denver Nuggets, acquiring the Houston Rockets' first-round pick from this season in relation to the Clippers' blockbuster trade in their removal of Chris Paul, as well as Jamal Crawford, Diamond Stone, and cash considerations from the Clippers and giving up the Washington Wizards' 2019 second-round pick to Denver. Finally, their sole second-round pick would be had by losing their first round tiebreaker with Dallas.

Ironically, the Hawks would trade their third pick (which became Luka Dončić) to the Dallas Mavericks in exchange for a protected 2019 first-round pick and the fifth pick of the draft, which became Trae Young from the University of Oklahoma. Young was a player that, before the start of the previous season, was projected to be a second-round pick. However, Young grew to be a star point guard for the Sooners, to the point where he became the first ever player in NCAA history to lead the league in both points and assists in the same season in his sole season with Oklahoma. For their second first-round pick of the draft, the Hawks drafted sophomore shooting guard Kevin Huerter from the University of Maryland as the 19th pick of the draft. Finally, with their last first-round pick of the year, the Hawks selected freshman power forward Omari Spellman from Villanova University, who was a prominent member of the team under their championship run last season.

== Roster ==
2018–19 Atlanta Hawks roster
Players

Pos.	No.	Player	Height	Weight	DOB	From
G	10	Jaylen Adams	6 ft 2 in (1.88 m)	190 lb (86 kg)	1996–05–04	St. Bonaventure
G/F	1	Justin Anderson	6 ft 6 in (1.98 m)	230 lb (104 kg)	1993–11–19	Virginia
G	24	Kent Bazemore	6 ft 5 in (1.96 m)	201 lb (91 kg)	1989–07–01	Old Dominion
F	95	DeAndre' Bembry	6 ft 6 in (1.98 m)	210 lb (95 kg)	1994–07–04	Saint Joseph's
G/F	15	Vince Carter	6 ft 6 in (1.98 m)	220 lb (100 kg)	1977–01–26	North Carolina
F/C	20	John Collins	6 ft 10 in (2.08 m)	235 lb (107 kg)	1997–09–23	Wake Forest
F	4	Deyonta Davis	6 ft 11 in (2.11 m)	237 lb (108 kg)	1996–12–26	Michigan State
C	14	Dewayne Dedmon	7 ft 0 in (2.13 m)	245 lb (111 kg)	1989–08–12	USC
G	3	Kevin Huerter	6 ft 7 in (2.01 m)	190 lb (86 kg)	1998–08–27	Maryland
C	8	Isaac Humphries	7 ft 0 in (2.13 m)	260 lb (118 kg)	1998–01–05	Kentucky
C	25	Alex Len	7 ft 1 in (2.16 m)	250 lb (113 kg)	1993–06–16	Maryland
C	18	Miles Plumlee (injured)	6 ft 11 in (2.11 m)	249 lb (113 kg)	1988–09–01	Duke
F	22	Alex Poythress (injured) (TW)	6 ft 9 in (2.06 m)	235 lb (107 kg)	1993–09–06	Kentucky
F	12	Taurean Prince	6 ft 8 in (2.03 m)	220 lb (100 kg)	1994–03–22	Baylor
F	6	Omari Spellman (injured)	6 ft 9 in (2.06 m)	245 lb (111 kg)	1997–07–21	Villanova
G	11	Trae Young	6 ft 2 in (1.88 m)	180 lb (82 kg)	1998–09–19	Oklahoma

Coaches
Head coach
- Lloyd Pierce
Assistant(s)
- Greg Foster
- Marlon Garnett
- Matt Hill
- Melvin Hunt
- Chris Jent
- Pete Radulovic (player development)

Legend
- (DP) Unsigned draft pick
- (FA) Free agent
- (S) Suspended
- (GL) On assignment to G League affiliate
- (TW) Two-way affiliate player
- Injured

Roster
Updated: 2019–03–08

== Standings ==
=== Division ===
Southeast Division	W	L	PCT	GB	Home	Road	Div	GP
y – Orlando Magic	42	40	.512	–	25‍–‍16	17‍–‍24	10–6	82
Charlotte Hornets	39	43	.476	3.0	25‍–‍16	14‍–‍27	10–6	82
Miami Heat	39	43	.476	3.0	19‍–‍22	20‍–‍21	7–9	82
Washington Wizards	32	50	.390	10.0	22‍–‍19	10‍–‍31	7–9	82
Atlanta Hawks	29	53	.354	13.0	17‍–‍24	12‍–‍29	6–10	82

=== Conference ===
Eastern Conference
#	Team	W	L	PCT	GB	GP
1	z – Milwaukee Bucks *	60	22	.732	–	82
2	y – Toronto Raptors *	58	24	.707	2.0	82
3	x – Philadelphia 76ers	51	31	.622	9.0	82
4	x – Boston Celtics	49	33	.598	11.0	82
5	x – Indiana Pacers	48	34	.585	12.0	82
6	x – Brooklyn Nets	42	40	.512	18.0	82
7	y – Orlando Magic *	42	40	.512	18.0	82
8	x – Detroit Pistons	41	41	.500	19.0	82
9	Charlotte Hornets	39	43	.476	21.0	82
10	Miami Heat	39	43	.476	21.0	82
11	Washington Wizards	32	50	.390	28.0	82
12	Atlanta Hawks	29	53	.354	31.0	82
13	Chicago Bulls	22	60	.268	38.0	82
14	Cleveland Cavaliers	19	63	.232	41.0	82
15	New York Knicks	17	65	.207	43.0	82

== Game log ==
=== Preseason ===
2018 preseason game log
Total: 2–3 (Home: 2–0; Road: 0–3)
Preseason: 2–3 (home: 2–0; road: 0–3)

Game	Date	Team	Score	High points	High rebounds	High assists	Location Attendance	Record
1	October 1	New Orleans	W 116–102	DeAndre' Bembry (20)	Alex Len (8)	Trae Young (8)	McCamish Pavilion; 6,619	1–0
2	October 5	@ Memphis	L 110–120	Tyler Dorsey (18)	Omari Spellman (9)	Trae Young (5)	FedEx Forum; 10,492	1–1
3	October 7	@ Oklahoma City	L 94–113	Alex Len (18)	Omari Spellman (7)	Taurean Prince (4)	Chesapeake Energy Arena; 14,470	1–2
4	October 10	San Antonio	W 130–127	Taurean Prince (25)	Alex Len (10)	Trae Young (7)	McCamish Pavilion; 7,433	2–2
5	October 12	@ Miami	L 113–119	Jeremy Lin (20)	Alex Poythress (8)	Trae Young (5)	American Airlines Arena; 19,600	2–3

2018–19 season schedule

=== Regular season ===
2018–19 game log
Total: 29–53 (Home: 17–24; Road: 12–29)
October: 2–5 (home: 1–1; road: 1–4)

Game	Date	Team	Score	High points	High rebounds	High assists	Location Attendance	Record
1	October 17	@ New York	L 107–126	Taurean Prince (21)	Bazemore, Prince, Young (6)	Taurean Prince (6)	Madison Square Garden; 18,249	0–1
2	October 19	@ Memphis	L 117–131	Taurean Prince (28)	Kent Bazemore (8)	Trae Young (9)	FedExForum; 17,019	0–2
3	October 21	@ Cleveland	W 133–111	Trae Young (35)	Alex Len (11)	Trae Young (11)	Quicken Loans Arena; 19,432	1–2
4	October 24	Dallas	W 111–104	Kent Bazemore (32)	DeAndre' Bembry (16)	Kent Bazemore (7)	State Farm Arena; 16,705	2–2
5	October 27	Chicago	L 85–97	Taurean Prince (16)	Dewayne Dedmon (13)	Young, Spellman (4)	State Farm Arena; 15,549	2–3
6	October 29	@ Philadelphia	L 92–113	Kent Bazemore (18)	DeAndre' Bembry (7)	Trae Young (8)	Wells Fargo Center; 20,269	2–4
7	October 30	@ Cleveland	L 114–136	Trae Young (24)	Alex Len (9)	Jeremy Lin (8)	Quicken Loans Arena; 19,432	2–5

November : 3–13 (home: 2–6; road: 1–7)

Game	Date	Team	Score	High points	High rebounds	High assists	Location Attendance	Record
8	November 1	Sacramento	L 115–146	Jeremy Lin (23)	Taurean Prince (7)	Trae Young (10)	State Farm Arena; 12,095	2–6
9	November 3	Miami	W 123–118	Trae Young (24)	Dewayne Dedmon (13)	Trae Young (15)	State Farm Arena; 16,303	3–6
10	November 6	@ Charlotte	L 102–113	Jeremy Lin (19)	Bembry, Dedmon (6)	Trae Young (10)	Spectrum Center; 13,955	3-7
11	November 7	New York	L 107–112	Omari Spellman (18)	Omari Spellman (10)	Trae Young (8)	State Farm Arena; 12,412	3–8
12	November 9	Detroit	L 109–124	Jeremy Lin (19)	Omari Spellman (10)	Trae Young (8)	State Farm Arena; 14,759	3–9
13	November 11	@ LA Lakers	L 106–107	Taurean Prince (23)	Alex Len (11)	Trae Young (12)	Staples Center; 18,997	3–10
14	November 13	@ Golden State	L 103–110	Taurean Prince (22)	Alex Poythress (8)	Trae Young (5)	Oracle Arena; 19,596	3–11
15	November 15	@ Denver	L 93–138	Jeremy Lin (16)	Omari Spellman (10)	Lin, Young (5)	Pepsi Center; 15,103	3–12
16	November 17	@ Indiana	L 89–97	Jeremy Lin (16)	Dewayne Dedmon (7)	Lin, Young, Len, Bazemore (4)	Bankers Life Fieldhouse; 17,491	3–13
17	November 19	LA Clippers	L 119–127	Trae Young (25)	Alex Len (12)	Trae Young (17)	State Farm Arena; 14,323	3–14
18	November 21	Toronto	L 108–124	Jeremy Lin (26)	Dewayne Dedmon (7)	Trae Young (5)	State Farm Arena; 15,058	3–15
19	November 23	Boston	L 96–114	Jeremy Lin (19)	Bembry, Dedmon, Collins (7)	Jeremy Lin (10)	State Farm Arena; 15,017	3–16
20	November 25	Charlotte	W 124–123	John Collins (23)	John Collins (11)	DeAndre' Bembry (6)	State Farm Arena; 12,977	4–16
21	November 27	@ Miami	W 115–113	Taurean Prince (18)	Alex Len (7)	Trae Young (10)	American Airlines Arena; 19,600	5–16
22	November 28	@ Charlotte	L 94–108	Trae Young (18)	John Collins (10)	Young, Huerter, Collins (4)	Spectrum Center; 12,971	5–17
23	November 30	@ Oklahoma City	L 109–124	Len, Collins (19)	John Collins (11)	Trae Young (8)	Chesapeake Energy Arena; 18,203	5–18

December : 6–7 (home: 3–3; road: 3–4)

Game	Date	Team	Score	High points	High rebounds	High assists	Location Attendance	Record
24	December 3	Golden State	L 111–128	John Collins (24)	John Collins (11)	Jeremy Lin (5)	State Farm Arena; 16,631	5–19
25	December 5	Washington	L 117–131	John Collins (26)	John Collins (14)	Young, Bembry, Bazemore (6)	State Farm Arena; 12,551	5–20
26	December 8	Denver	W 106–98	John Collins (30)	John Collins (12)	Kent Bazemore (8)	State Farm Arena; 14,409	6–20
27	December 12	@ Dallas	L 107–114	Trae Young (24)	John Collins (17)	Trae Young (10)	American Airlines Center; 19,643	6–21
28	December 14	@ Boston	L 108–129	Kevin Huerter (19)	John Collins (14)	Kent Bazemore (7)	TD Garden; 18,624	6–22
29	December 16	@ Brooklyn	L 127–144	John Collins (29)	Dewayne Dedmon (12)	Trae Young (10)	Barclays Center; 13,955	6–23
30	December 18	Washington	W 118–110	John Collins (26)	John Collins (14)	Young, Lin (4)	State Farm Arena; 16,489	7–23
31	December 21	@ New York	W 114–107	Kent Bazemore (22)	John Collins (16)	Trae Young (10)	Madison Square Garden; 19,080	8–23
32	December 23	@ Detroit	W 98–95	Vince Carter (18)	Alex Len (17)	Trae Young (6)	Little Caesars Arena; 16,532	9–23
33	December 26	Indiana	L 121–129	Kent Bazemore (32)	Dewayne Dedmon (15)	Trae Young (9)	State Farm Arena; 15,026	9–24
34	December 28	@ Minnesota	W 123–120 (OT)	Kent Bazemore (23)	Dewayne Dedmon (13)	Trae Young (11)	Target Center; 18,978	10–24
35	December 29	Cleveland	W 111–108	Carter, Young (21)	John Collins (12)	Trae Young (9)	State Farm Arena; 16,460	11–24
36	December 31	@ Indiana	L 108–116	Huerter, Collins (22)	John Collins (16)	Trae Young (7)	Bankers Life Fieldhouse; 17,923	11–25

January : 5–9 (home: 2–3; road: 3–6)

Game	Date	Team	Score	High points	High rebounds	High assists	Location Attendance	Record
37	January 2	@ Washington	L 98–114	John Collins (21)	Alex Len (11)	Trae Young (7)	Capital One Arena; 15,324	11–26
38	January 4	@ Milwaukee	L 112–144	DeAndre' Bembry (19)	Alex Len (8)	Trae Young (10)	Fiserv Forum; 17,632	11–27
39	January 6	Miami	W 106–82	Trae Young (19)	John Collins (13)	Kevin Huerter (7)	State Farm Arena; 16,630	12–27
40	January 8	@ Toronto	L 101–104	John Collins (21)	John Collins (14)	Trae Young (9)	Scotiabank Arena; 19,800	12–28
41	January 9	@ Brooklyn	L 100–116	John Collins (30)	John Collins (14)	Trae Young (7)	Barclays Center; 14,531	12–29
42	January 11	@ Philadelphia	W 123–121	Kevin Huerter (29)	John Collins (9)	Dewayne Dedmon (7)	Wells Fargo Center; 20,487	13–29
43	January 13	Milwaukee	L 114–133	Trae Young (26)	John Collins (11)	Jeremy Lin (5)	State Farm Arena; 16,292	13–30
44	January 15	Oklahoma City	W 142–126	John Collins (26)	Alex Len (11)	Trae Young (11)	State Farm Arena; 15,045	14–30
45	January 19	Boston	L 105–113	Kevin Huerter (18)	John Collins (11)	Huerter, Young (7)	State Farm Arena; 16,626	14–31
46	January 21	Orlando	L 103–122	Dewayne Dedmon (24)	John Collins (10)	DeAndre' Bembry (7)	State Farm Arena; 16,611	14–32
47	January 23	@ Chicago	W 121–101	John Collins (35)	Alex Len (10)	Trae Young (12)	United Center; 18,223	15–32
48	January 26	@ Portland	L 111–120	Trae Young (30)	Collins, Prince (6)	Trae Young (8)	Moda Center; 19,629	15–33
49	January 28	@ LA Clippers	W 123–118	Trae Young (26)	Dewayne Dedmon (10)	Trae Young (8)	Staples Center; 17,382	16–33
50	January 30	@ Sacramento	L 113–135	Trae Young (23)	Dewayne Dedmon (9)	Trae Young (8)	Golden 1 Center; 17,583	16–34

February : 5–7 (home: 3–5; road: 2–2)

Game	Date	Team	Score	High points	High rebounds	High assists	Location Attendance	Record
51	February 1	@ Utah	L 112–128	Trae Young (28)	DeAndre' Bembry (8)	Trae Young (9)	Vivint Smart Home Arena; 18,306	16–35
52	February 2	@ Phoenix	W 118–112	John Collins (35)	John Collins (16)	Trae Young (8)	Talking Stick Resort Arena; 15,534	17–35
53	February 4	@ Washington	W 137–129	Taurean Prince (21)	John Collins (11)	Trae Young (10)	Capital One Arena; 15,025	18–35
54	February 7	Toronto	L 101–119	Prince, Young (19)	John Collins (12)	Huerter, Young (5)	State Farm Arena; 16,038	18–36
55	February 9	Charlotte	L 120–129	Trae Young (20)	Len, Dedmon (7)	Trae Young (11)	State Farm Arena; 15,048	18–37
56	February 10	Orlando	L 108–124	Alex Len (16)	Dewayne Dedmon (6)	Trae Young (7)	State Farm Arena; 13,370	18–38
57	February 12	LA Lakers	W 117–113	Young, Collins (22)	John Collins (8)	Trae Young (14)	State Farm Arena; 16,824	19–38
58	February 14	New York	L 91–106	Dewayne Dedmon (21)	Omari Spellman (9)	Trae Young (11)	State Farm Arena; 14,179	19–39
59	February 22	Detroit	L 122–125	Trae Young (30)	Dewayne Dedmon (10)	Trae Young (10)	State Farm Arena; 14,067	19–40
60	February 23	Phoenix	W 120–112	Young, Bazemore (23)	John Collins (14)	Trae Young (8)	State Farm Arena; 15,214	20–40
61	February 25	@ Houston	L 111–119	Trae Young (36)	John Collins (12)	Trae Young (8)	Toyota Center; 18,055	20–41
62	February 27	Minnesota	W 131–123 (OT)	Trae Young (36)	Dewayne Dedmon (10)	Trae Young (10)	State Farm Arena; 14,101	21–41

March : 7–8 (home: 5–5; road: 2–3)

Game	Date	Team	Score	High points	High rebounds	High assists	Location Attendance	Record
63	March 1	Chicago	L 161–168 (4OT)	Trae Young (49)	Dewayne Dedmon (12)	Trae Young (16)	State Farm Arena; 15,267	21–42
64	March 3	@ Chicago	W 123–118	Alex Len (28)	Dewayne Dedmon (12)	DeAndre' Bembry (7)	United Center; 20,526	22–42
65	March 4	@ Miami	L 113–114	Vince Carter (21)	Dedmon, Poythress (6)	Trae Young (8)	American Airlines Arena; 19,600	22–43
66	March 6	San Antonio	L 104–111	Trae Young (22)	John Collins (10)	Kevin Huerter (5)	State Farm Arena; 15,208	22–44
67	March 9	Brooklyn	L 112–114	John Collins (33)	John Collins (20)	Trae Young (11)	State Farm Arena; 16,527	22–45
68	March 10	New Orleans	W 128–116	Kevin Huerter (27)	John Collins (10)	Trae Young (10)	State Farm Arena; 14,337	23–45
69	March 13	Memphis	W 132–111	John Collins (27)	John Collins (12)	Trae Young (8)	State Farm Arena; 15,169	24–45
70	March 16	@ Boston	L 120–129	Trae Young (26)	Dewayne Dedmon (13)	John Collins (6)	TD Garden; 18,624	24–46
71	March 17	@ Orlando	L 91–101	Trae Young (20)	Dewayne Dedmon (14)	Trae Young (5)	Amway Center; 18,045	24–47
72	March 19	Houston	L 105–121	Trae Young (21)	John Collins (10)	Trae Young (12)	State Farm Arena; 16,293	24–48
73	March 21	Utah	W 117–114	Trae Young (23)	Dewayne Dedmon (9)	Trae Young (11)	State Farm Arena; 15,569	25–48
74	March 23	Philadelphia	W 129–127	Trae Young (32)	John Collins (9)	Trae Young (11)	State Farm Arena; 16,640	26–48
75	March 26	@ New Orleans	W 130–120	Trae Young (33)	Dewayne Dedmon (9)	Trae Young (12)	Smoothie King Center; 14,751	27–48
76	March 29	Portland	L 98–118	Trae Young (26)	Trae Young (9)	Trae Young (7)	State Farm Arena; 16,182	27–49
77	March 31	Milwaukee	W 136–135 (OT)	Justin Anderson (24)	Justin Anderson (12)	Trae Young (16)	State Farm Arena; 16,660	28–49

April : 1–4 (home: 1–1; road: 0–3)

Game	Date	Team	Score	High points	High rebounds	High assists	Location Attendance	Record
78	April 2	@ San Antonio	L 111–117	Kent Bazemore (26)	Dewayne Dedmon (10)	Trae Young (6)	AT&T Center; 18,354	28–50
79	April 3	Philadelphia	W 130–122	Trae Young (33)	John Collins (8)	Trae Young (12)	State Farm Arena; 16,638	29–50
80	April 5	@ Orlando	L 113–149	Trae Young (22)	DeAndre' Bembry (10)	Trae Young (6)	Amway Center; 18,999	29–51
81	April 7	@ Milwaukee	L 107–115	Alex Len (33)	Vince Carter (9)	Kevin Huerter (6)	Fiserv Forum; 17,775	29–52
82	April 10	Indiana	L 134–135	Trae Young (23)	John Collins (25)	Trae Young (11)	State Farm Arena; 17,143	29–53

2018–19 season schedule

== Player statistics ==
Player	Pos.	GP	GS	MP	Reb.	Ast.	Stl.	Blk.	Pts.
Jaylen Adams	PG	34	1	428	60	65	14	5	108
Justin Anderson	SF	48	4	463	84	23	22	13	178
Kent Bazemore	SG	67	35	1,643	261	152	89	42	779
DeAndre' Bembry	SG	82	15	1,931	358	202	105	41	687
Vince Carter	SF	76	9	1,330	194	87	44	27	562
John Collins	PF	61	59	1,829	595	121	22	39	1,188
Deyonta Davis^{‡}	C	9	0	118	36	5	3	5	36
Dewayne Dedmon	C	64	52	1,609	480	90	69	71	693
Tyler Dorsey^{†}	SG	27	0	251	43	17	7	1	90
Daniel Hamilton^{‡}	SG	19	3	204	47	22	6	1	57
Kevin Huerter	SG	75	59	2,048	245	214	65	25	727
Isaac Humphries^{†}	C	5	1	56	11	0	1	0	15
B. J. Johnson^{†}	SF	6	0	43	8	0	2	0	21
Alex Len	C	77	31	1,544	424	86	27	69	854
Jeremy Lin^{‡}	PG	51	1	1,003	119	181	38	7	546
Miles Plumlee	C	18	0	173	39	17	6	4	80
Alex Poythress	PF	21	1	305	76	17	4	10	107
Jordan Sibert	SG	1	0	4	0	0	0	0	3
Omari Spellman	PF	46	11	805	194	47	26	25	272
Taurean Prince	SF	55	47	1,552	199	118	53	19	742
Trae Young	PG	81	81	2,503	301	653	72	15	1,549
Tyler Zeller^{†}	C	2	0	11	6	1	0	0	0

After all games.
^{‡}Waived during the season
^{†}Traded during the season
^{≠}Acquired during the season

== Transactions ==
=== Trades ===
June 21, 2018	To Atlanta Hawks Draft rights to Trae Young; 2019 Dallas protected first-round pick	To Dallas Mavericks Draft rights to (Slovenia) Luka Dončić
June 21, 2018	To Atlanta Hawks 2019 Second Round Pick; 2023 Second Round Pick	To Charlotte Hornets Draft rights to Devonte' Graham
July 13, 2018	To Atlanta Hawks Jeremy Lin; 2025 second-round pick Right to swap 2023 second-round pick	To Brooklyn Nets 2020 protected second-round pick Draft rights to Isaia Cordinier
July 25, 2018	To Atlanta Hawks Carmelo Anthony (from Oklahoma City); Justin Anderson (from Philadelphia); 2022 protected first-round pick (from Oklahoma City)	To Oklahoma City Thunder Dennis Schröder (from Atlanta); Timothé Luwawu-Cabarrot (from Philadelphia)
July 25, 2018	To Philadelphia 76ers Mike Muscala (from Atlanta)	

=== Free agents ===
==== Additions ====
Player	Signed	Former team
Jaylen Adams	Two-way contract	St. Bonaventure Bonnies
Alex Len	August 3, 2018	Phoenix Suns
Daniel Hamilton	August 20, 2018	Oklahoma City Thunder
Alex Poythress	Two-way contract	Indiana Pacers
Vince Carter	August 24, 2018	Sacramento Kings
Thomas Robinson	August 30, 2018	(Russia) BC Khimki
R. J. Hunter	September 7, 2018	Houston Rockets
Cole Aldrich	September 18, 2018	Minnesota Timberwolves
Isaac Humphries	October 8, 2018	(Serbia) KK FMP Beograd
C. J. Anderson	October 9, 2018	UMass Minutemen

==== Subtractions ====
Player	Reason left	New team
Tyler Cavanaugh	Waived	Utah Jazz
Isaiah Taylor	Waived	Cleveland Cavaliers
Damion Lee	Unrestricted free agent	Golden State Warriors
Jaylen Morris	Waived	Milwaukee Bucks
Antonius Cleveland	Waived	Chicago Bulls
Josh Magette	Unrestricted free agent	(Croatia) KK Cedevita
Malcolm Delaney	Unrestricted free agent	(China) Guangdong Southern Tigers
Carmelo Anthony	Waived	Houston Rockets
Cole Aldrich	Waived	(China) Tianjin Gold Lions
Thomas Robinson	Waived	(China) Beikong Fly Dragons
R. J. Hunter	Waived	
C. J. Anderson	Waived	
