= 2019–20 Atlanta Hawks season =

Season of National Basketball Association team the Atlanta Hawks

- Head coach: Lloyd Pierce
- General manager: Travis Schlenk
- Owners: Tony Ressler
- Arena: State Farm Arena

Results
- Record: 20–47 (.299)
- Place: Division: 5th (Southeast); Conference: 14th (Eastern)
- Playoff finish: Did not qualify
- Stats at Basketball Reference

Local media
- Television: Fox Sports South
- Radio: 92.9 FM "The Game"

The 2019–20 Atlanta Hawks season was the 71st season of the franchise in the National Basketball Association (NBA) and the 52nd in Atlanta.

This was the first time since the 2013–14 season that did not include Kent Bazemore on the roster, as he was traded to the Portland Trail Blazers for Evan Turner. This also marks Vince Carter's 22nd and final season in the NBA, becoming the longest-tenured player in NBA history at the time, as well as the first to play in 4 different decades. Carter was also the last remaining active player who was drafted and had played in the 1990s.

The season was suspended by the league officials following the games of March 11 after it was first reported that Rudy Gobert tested positive for COVID-19. Vince Carter would play in what became his final game of his career later that night, hitting a three-pointer in an overtime loss to the New York Knicks at home. On June 4, 2020, it was announced by the NBA Board of Governors approved a plan that would restart the season with 22 teams returning to play in the NBA Bubble on July 31, 2020, which was approved by the National Basketball Players Association the next day. The Hawks, with the league's fourth-worst record at the time of the season's suspension, were not among them, effectively ending the team's season.

== Draft picks ==
Round	Pick	Player	Position	Nationality	School/Club team
1	8	Jaxson Hayes	C	United States	Texas
1	10	Cam Reddish	SF	United States	Duke
2	35	Marcos Louzada Silva	SF	Brazil	Sesi/Franca

The Atlanta Hawks held two first-round pick and three second-round draft picks before entering the NBA draft lottery. On the night of the draft lottery, both their own first-round pick and the pick acquired from the Dallas Mavericks the prior season fell down to become the Hawks' 8th and 10th selections of the draft, respectively. On June 6, the Hawks agreed to also acquire the 17th pick of the draft from the Brooklyn Nets alongside a future first-round pick and Allen Crabbe in exchange for Taurean Prince and a 2020 second-round pick. Before the night of the 2019 NBA draft, the Hawks traded the 44th pick of the draft to the Miami Heat for a conditional 2024 second-round pick and cash considerations.

On the night of the draft, the Hawks agreed to a trade where they gave away picks 8, 17, and 35 to the New Orleans Pelicans in exchange for Solomon Hill, as well as the fourth pick of the draft (which became forward De'Andre Hunter from the University of Virginia), the 57th selection, and a future second-round pick. They also selected small forward Cam Reddish from Duke with their second selection in the top 10, as well as Angolan power forward Bruno Fernando from the University of Maryland with their last selection the Hawks kept.

== Roster ==
2019–20 Atlanta Hawks roster
Players

Pos.	No.	Player	Height	Weight	DOB	From
G/F	95	DeAndre' Bembry	6 ft 5 in (1.96 m)	210 lb (95 kg)	1994–07–04	Saint Joseph's
G	4	Charlie Brown Jr. (TW)	6 ft 6 in (1.98 m)	199 lb (90 kg)	1998–02–02	Saint Joseph's
C	17	Clint Capela	6 ft 10 in (2.08 m)	240 lb (109 kg)	1994–05–18	Switzerland
G/F	15	Vince Carter	6 ft 6 in (1.98 m)	220 lb (100 kg)	1977–01–06	North Carolina
F	20	John Collins	6 ft 10 in (2.08 m)	235 lb (107 kg)	1997–09–23	Wake Forest
C	14	Dewayne Dedmon	7 ft 0 in (2.13 m)	245 lb (111 kg)	1989–08–12	USC
F/C	24	Bruno Fernando	6 ft 10 in (2.08 m)	240 lb (109 kg)	1998–08–15	Maryland
G	0	Brandon Goodwin	6 ft 0 in (1.83 m)	180 lb (82 kg)	1995–10–02	Florida Gulf Coast
G/F	2	Treveon Graham	6 ft 5 in (1.96 m)	219 lb (99 kg)	1993–10–28	VCU
G	3	Kevin Huerter	6 ft 7 in (2.01 m)	190 lb (86 kg)	1998–08–27	Maryland
G/F	12	De'Andre Hunter	6 ft 7 in (2.01 m)	225 lb (102 kg)	1997–12–02	Virginia
C	30	Damian Jones	7 ft 0 in (2.13 m)	245 lb (111 kg)	1995–06–30	Vanderbilt
F	7	Skal Labissière	6 ft 11 in (2.11 m)	235 lb (107 kg)	1996–03–18	Kentucky
G/F	22	Cam Reddish	6 ft 8 in (2.03 m)	218 lb (99 kg)	1999–09–01	Duke
G	00	Jeff Teague	6 ft 3 in (1.91 m)	195 lb (88 kg)	1988–06–10	Wake Forest
G	11	Trae Young	6 ft 1 in (1.85 m)	180 lb (82 kg)	1998–09–19	Oklahoma

Coaches
Head coach
- Lloyd Pierce
Assistant(s)
- Greg Foster
- Marlon Garnett
- Matt Hill
- Melvin Hunt
- Chris Jent

Legend
- (DP) Unsigned draft pick
- (FA) Free agent
- (S) Suspended
- (GL) On assignment to G League affiliate
- (TW) Two-way affiliate player
- Injured

Roster
Updated: 2020–02–05

== Standings ==
=== Division ===
Southeast Division	W	L	PCT	GB	Home	Road	Div	GP
y – Miami Heat	44	29	.603	–	29‍–‍7	15‍–‍22	10–4	73
x – Orlando Magic	33	40	.452	11.0	18‍–‍17	15‍–‍23	9–5	73
Washington Wizards	25	47	.347	18.5	16‍–‍20	9‍–‍27	5–9	72
Charlotte Hornets	23	42	.354	17.0	10‍–‍21	13‍–‍21	2–7	65
Atlanta Hawks	20	47	.299	21.0	14‍–‍20	6‍–‍27	6–7	67

=== Conference ===
Eastern Conference
#	Team	W	L	PCT	GB	GP
1	z – Milwaukee Bucks *	56	17	.767	–	73
2	y – Toronto Raptors *	53	19	.736	2.5	72
3	x – Boston Celtics	48	24	.667	7.5	72
4	x – Indiana Pacers	45	28	.616	11.0	73
5	y – Miami Heat *	44	29	.603	12.0	73
6	x – Philadelphia 76ers	43	30	.589	13.0	73
7	x – Brooklyn Nets	35	37	.486	20.5	72
8	x – Orlando Magic	33	40	.452	23.0	73
9	Washington Wizards	25	47	.347	30.5	72
10	Charlotte Hornets	23	42	.354	29.0	65
11	Chicago Bulls	22	43	.338	30.0	65
12	New York Knicks	21	45	.318	31.5	66
13	Detroit Pistons	20	46	.303	32.5	66
14	Atlanta Hawks	20	47	.299	33.0	67
15	Cleveland Cavaliers	19	46	.292	33.0	65

== Game log ==
=== Preseason ===
2019 preseason game log
Total: 1–4 (Home: 0–2; Road: 1–2)
Preseason: 1–4 (home: 0–2; road: 1–2)

Game	Date	Team	Score	High points	High rebounds	High assists	Location Attendance	Record
1	October 7	New Orleans	L 109–133	DeAndre' Bembry (16)	Collins, Jones, Brown Jr., Parker (5)	Trae Young (11)	State Farm Arena; 15,441	0–1
2	October 9	Orlando	L 88–97	Trae Young (18)	Jabari Parker (9)	Young, Goodwin (5)	State Farm Arena; 10,945	0–2
3	October 14	@ Miami	L 87–120	Trae Young (23)	Jabari Parker (10)	Young, Hunter (4)	American Airlines Arena; 19,600	0–3
4	October 16	@ New York	W 100–96	Trae Young (23)	John Collins (14)	Trae Young (9)	Madison Square Garden; 19,812	1–3
5	October 17	@ Chicago	L 93–111	Jabari Parker (15)	Len (11)	Len, Young, Turner (4)	United Center; 18,277	1–4

2019–20 season schedule

=== Regular season ===
2019–20 game log
Total: 20–47 (Home: 14–20; Road: 6–27)
October: 2–3 (home: 1–2; road: 1–1)

Game	Date	Team	Score	High points	High rebounds	High assists	Location Attendance	Record
1	October 24	@ Detroit	W 117–100	Trae Young (38)	John Collins (10)	Trae Young (9)	Little Caesars Arena; 20,332	1–0
2	October 26	Orlando	W 103–99	Trae Young (39)	John Collins (12)	Trae Young (9)	State Farm Arena; 17,078	2–0
3	October 28	Philadelphia	L 103–105	Trae Young (25)	De'Andre Hunter (9)	Trae Young (9)	State Farm Arena; 14,094	2–1
4	October 29	@ Miami	L 97–112	John Collins (30)	John Collins (7)	Cam Reddish (6)	American Airlines Arena; 19,600	2–2
5	October 31	Miami	L 97–106	Jabari Parker (23)	DeAndre' Bembry (10)	DeAndre' Bembry (8)	State Farm Arena; 16,539	2–3

November : 2–13 (home: 1–5; road: 1–8)

Game	Date	Team	Score	High points	High rebounds	High assists	Location Attendance	Record
6	November 5	San Antonio	W 108–100	Trae Young (29)	Parker, Hunter (8)	Trae Young (13)	State Farm Arena; 14,025	3–3
7	November 6	Chicago	L 93–113	Jabari Parker (18)	Bruno Fernando (6)	DeAndre' Bembry (4)	State Farm Arena; 15,049	3–4
8	November 8	Sacramento	L 109–121	Trae Young (30)	Jabari Parker (8)	Trae Young (12)	State Farm Arena; 16,447	3–5
9	November 10	@ Portland	L 113–124 (OT)	Trae Young (35)	Jabari Parker (11)	Trae Young (10)	Moda Center; 20,041	3–6
10	November 12	@ Denver	W 125–121	Trae Young (42)	Jabari Parker (9)	Trae Young (11)	Pepsi Center; 18,327	4–6
11	November 14	@ Phoenix	L 112–128	Jabari Parker (24)	Alex Len (10)	Trae Young (13)	Talking Stick Resort Arena; 15,143	4–7
12	November 16	@ L. A. Clippers	L 101–150	Trae Young (20)	Jabari Parker (8)	Trae Young (6)	Staples Center; 19,068	4–8
13	November 17	@ L. A. Lakers	L 101–122	Trae Young (31)	Jabari Parker (8)	Trae Young (7)	Staples Center; 18,997	4–9
14	November 20	Milwaukee	L 127–135	De'Andre Hunter (27)	De'Andre Hunter (11)	Trae Young (8)	State Farm Arena; 16,441	4–10
15	November 22	@ Detroit	L 103–128	DeAndre' Bembry (22)	Trae Young (6)	Trae Young (8)	Little Caesars Arena; 15,399	4–11
16	November 23	Toronto	L 116–119	Trae Young (30)	Trae Young (10)	Trae Young (10)	State Farm Arena; 16,931	4–12
17	November 25	Minnesota	L 113–125	Trae Young (37)	Parker, Crabbe (7)	Trae Young (9)	State Farm Arena; 16,218	4–13
18	November 27	@ Milwaukee	L 102–111	Jabari Parker (33)	Jabari Parker (14)	Trae Young (7)	Fiserv Forum; 17,525	4–14
19	November 29	@ Indiana	L 104–105 (OT)	Trae Young (49)	DeAndre' Bembry (12)	Trae Young (6)	Bankers Life Fieldhouse; 15,827	4–15
20	November 30	@ Houston	L 111–158	Trae Young (37)	Bembry, Hunter (5)	Trae Young (7)	Toyota Center; 18,055	4–16

December : 3–11 (home: 1–5; road: 2–6)

Game	Date	Team	Score	High points	High rebounds	High assists	Location Attendance	Record
21	December 2	Golden State	W 104–79	Trae Young (24)	Bembry, Jones (8)	Trae Young (7)	State Farm Arena; 14,278	5–16
22	December 4	Brooklyn	L 118–130	Trae Young (39)	Damian Jones (8)	Trae Young (10)	State Farm Arena; 15,694	5–17
23	December 8	@ Charlotte	W 122–107	Trae Young (30)	Alex Len (10)	Trae Young (9)	Spectrum Center; 15,489	6–17
24	December 10	@ Miami	L 121–135 (OT)	De'Andre Hunter (28)	Parker, Reddish (7)	Trae Young (9)	American Airlines Arena; 19,600	6–18
25	December 11	@ Chicago	L 102–136	Alex Len (17)	Jabari Parker (7)	Trae Young (13)	United Center; 15,084	6–19
26	December 13	Indiana	L 100–110	Trae Young (23)	Alex Len (13)	Trae Young (8)	State Farm Arena; 15,121	6–20
27	December 15	L. A. Lakers	L 96–101	Trae Young (30)	Alex Len (7)	Trae Young (7)	State Farm Arena; 16,962	6–21
28	December 17	@ New York	L 120–143	Trae Young (42)	Len, Parker, Hunter (5)	Trae Young (8)	Madison Square Garden; 18,268	6–22
29	December 19	Utah	L 106–111	Trae Young (30)	Jabari Parker (9)	Trae Young (8)	State Farm Arena; 16,739	6–23
30	December 21	@ Brooklyn	L 112–122	Trae Young (47)	Alex Len (14)	Huerter, Young (6)	Barclays Center; 16,496	6–24
31	December 23	@ Cleveland	L 118–121	Trae Young (30)	John Collins (10)	Trae Young (11)	Rocket Mortgage FieldHouse; 18,007	6–25
32	December 27	Milwaukee	L 86–112	Allen Crabbe (20)	John Collins (16)	Kevin Huerter (3)	State Farm Arena; 17,358	6–26
33	December 28	@ Chicago	L 81–116	John Collins (34)	John Collins (8)	Cam Reddish (6)	United Center; 21,496	6–27
34	December 30	@ Orlando	W 101–93	Brandon Goodwin (21)	Alex Len (12)	Brandon Goodwin (6)	Amway Center; 17,784	7–27

January : 6–9 (home: 5–4; road: 1–5)

Game	Date	Team	Score	High points	High rebounds	High assists	Location Attendance	Record
35	January 3	@ Boston	L 106–109	Trae Young (28)	Collins, Len (8)	Trae Young (10)	TD Garden; 19,156	7–28
36	January 4	Indiana	W 116–111	Trae Young (41)	Alex Len (9)	Trae Young (8)	State Farm Arena; 16,420	8–28
37	January 6	Denver	L 115–123	Trae Young (29)	Kevin Huerter (8)	Trae Young (12)	State Farm Arena; 15,286	8–29
38	January 8	Houston	L 115–122	Trae Young (42)	John Collins (14)	Trae Young (10)	State Farm Arena; 16,514	8–30
39	January 10	@ Washington	L 101–111	Trae Young (19)	John Collins (15)	Trae Young (7)	Capital One Arena; 16,360	8–31
40	January 12	@ Brooklyn	L 86–108	Cam Reddish (20)	Collins, Huerter, Jones (5)	Kevin Huerter (5)	Barclays Center; 15,201	8–32
41	January 14	Phoenix	W 123–110	Trae Young (36)	Kevin Huerter (15)	Trae Young (10)	State Farm Arena; 16,060	9–32
42	January 17	@ San Antonio	W 121–120	Trae Young (31)	John Collins (10)	Trae Young (9)	AT&T Center; 18,354	10–32
43	January 18	Detroit	L 103–136	John Collins (20)	Trae Young (8)	Teague, Young (7)	State Farm Arena; 17,056	10–33
44	January 20	Toronto	L 117–122	Trae Young (42)	John Collins (11)	Trae Young (15)	State Farm Arena; 17,300	10–34
45	January 22	L. A. Clippers	W 102–95	John Collins (33)	John Collins (16)	Jeff Teague (8)	State Farm Arena; 14,338	11–34
46	January 24	@ Oklahoma City	L 111–140	John Collins (28)	Collins, Huerter, Reddish (6)	Trae Young (16)	Chesapeake Energy Arena; 18,203	11–35
47	January 26	Washington	W 152–133	Trae Young (45)	Bruno Fernando (12)	Trae Young (14)	State Farm Arena; 15,567	12–35
48	January 28	@ Toronto	L 114–130	John Collins (28)	John Collins (12)	Trae Young (13)	Scotiabank Arena; 19,800	12–36
49	January 30	Philadelphia	W 127–117	Trae Young (39)	John Collins (20)	Trae Young (18)	State Farm Arena; 15,227	13–36

February : 6–7 (home: 5–2; road: 1–5)

Game	Date	Team	Score	High points	High rebounds	High assists	Location Attendance	Record
50	February 1	@ Dallas	L 100–123	John Collins (26)	Damian Jones (12)	Jeff Teague (8)	American Airlines Center; 20,328	13–37
51	February 3	Boston	L 115–123	Trae Young (34)	John Collins (11)	Trae Young (7)	State Farm Arena; 16,231	13–38
52	February 5	@ Minnesota	W 127–120	Trae Young (38)	John Collins (12)	Trae Young (11)	Target Center; 10,779	14–38
53	February 7	@ Boston	L 107–112	John Collins (30)	John Collins (10)	Kevin Huerter (6)	TD Garden; 19,156	14–39
54	February 9	New York	W 140–135 (2OT)	Trae Young (48)	John Collins (16)	Trae Young (13)	State Farm Arena; 16,309	15–39
55	February 10	@ Orlando	L 126–135	Trae Young (29)	Dewayne Dedmon (9)	Jeff Teague (11)	Amway Center; 17,076	15–40
56	February 12	@ Cleveland	L 105–127	Trae Young (27)	De'Andre Hunter (8)	Trae Young (12)	Rocket Mortgage FieldHouse; 16,200	15–41
57	February 20	Miami	W 129–124	Trae Young (50)	Dewayne Dedmon (8)	Trae Young (8)	State Farm Arena; 17,356	16–41
58	February 22	Dallas	W 111–107	John Collins (35)	John Collins (17)	Trae Young (10)	State Farm Arena; 17,050	17–41
59	February 24	@ Philadelphia	L 112–129	Trae Young (28)	John Collins (9)	Trae Young (10)	Wells Fargo Center; 20,836	17–42
60	February 26	Orlando	L 120–130	Trae Young (37)	De'Andre Hunter (11)	Trae Young (11)	State Farm Arena; 14,967	17–43
61	February 28	Brooklyn	W 141–118	John Collins (33)	John Collins (13)	Trae Young (14)	State Farm Arena; 17,034	18–43
62	February 29	Portland	W 129–117	Trae Young (25)	John Collins (10)	Trae Young (15)	State Farm Arena; 17,765	19–43

March: 1–4 (home: 1–2; road: 0–2)

Game	Date	Team	Score	High points	High rebounds	High assists	Location Attendance	Record
63	March 2	Memphis	L 88–127	Trae Young (19)	Hunter, Jones (7)	Kevin Huerter (4)	State Farm Arena; 16,207	19–44
64	March 6	@ Washington	L 112–118	Cam Reddish (28)	John Collins (10)	Kevin Huerter (11)	Capital One Arena; 17,856	19–45
65	March 7	@ Memphis	L 101–118	John Collins (27)	Dewayne Dedmon (10)	Kevin Huerter (6)	FedExForum; 17,117	19–46
66	March 9	Charlotte	W 143–138 (2OT)	Trae Young (31)	Collins, Hunter (11)	Trae Young (16)	State Farm Arena; 14,399	20–46
67	March 11	New York	L 131–136 (OT)	Trae Young (42)	John Collins (15)	Trae Young (11)	State Farm Arena; 15,393	20–47

Cancelled games

Game	Date	Team	Score	High points	High rebounds	High assists	Location Attendance	Record
68	March 14	Cleveland					State Farm Arena	
69	March 16	@ New Orleans					Smoothie King Center	
70	March 18	Oklahoma City					State Farm Arena	
71	March 20	Washington					State Farm Arena	
72	March 21	@ Philadelphia					Wells Fargo Center	
73	March 25	@ Golden State					Chase Center	
74	March 26	@ Sacramento					Golden 1 Center	
75	March 28	@ Utah					Vivint Smart Home Arena	
76	March 31	New Orleans					State Farm Arena	
77	April 3	Charlotte					State Farm Arena	
78	April 5	@ Charlotte					Spectrum Center	
79	April 7	Detroit					State Farm Arena	
80	April 10	@ Toronto					Scotiabank Arena	
81	April 12	@ Milwaukee					Fiserv Forum	
82	April 15	Cleveland					State Farm Arena	

2019–20 season schedule

== Player statistics ==
Legend
GP	Games played	GS	Games started	MPG	Minutes per game
FG%	Field-goal percentage	3P%	3-point field-goal percentage	FT%	Free-throw percentage
RPG	Rebounds per game	APG	Assists per game	SPG	Steals per game
BPG	Blocks per game	PPG	Points per game

=== Regular season ===
Player	GP	GS	MPG	FG%	3P%	FT%	RPG	APG	SPG	BPG	PPG
De'Andre Hunter	63	62	32.0	.410	.355	.764	4.5	1.8	.7	.3	12.3
Trae Young	60	60	35.3	.437	.361	.860	4.3	9.3	1.1	.1	29.6
Vince Carter	60	0	14.6	.352	.302	.793	2.1	.8	.4	.4	5.0
Cam Reddish	58	34	26.7	.384	.332	.802	3.7	1.5	1.1	.5	10.5
Kevin Huerter	56	48	31.4	.413	.380	.828	4.1	3.8	.9	.5	12.2
Bruno Fernando	56	13	12.7	.518	.135	.569	3.5	.9	.3	.3	4.3
Damian Jones	55	27	16.1	.680	.222	.738	3.7	.6	.5	.7	5.6
DeAndre' Bembry	43	4	21.3	.456	.231	.542	3.5	1.9	1.3	.4	5.8
John Collins	41	41	33.2	.583	.401	.800	10.1	1.5	.8	1.6	21.6
Alex Len^{†}	40	9	18.6	.546	.250	.630	5.8	1.1	.5	.8	8.7
Brandon Goodwin	34	1	12.6	.400	.299	.933	2.1	1.5	.4	.1	6.1
Jabari Parker^{†}	32	23	26.2	.504	.270	.736	6.0	1.8	1.3	.5	15.0
Allen Crabbe^{†}	28	1	18.6	.364	.323	.750	2.3	1.0	.5	.1	5.1
Jeff Teague^{†}	25	4	20.8	.412	.333	.887	2.2	4.0	.8	.2	7.7
Treveon Graham^{†}	22	0	12.1	.373	.351	.474	2.3	.7	.3	.2	3.3
Evan Turner	19	0	13.2	.373	.000	.857	2.0	2.0	.5	.4	3.3
Tyrone Wallace	14	0	11.4	.318	.067	.647	1.6	.9	.5	.1	2.9
Dewayne Dedmon^{†}	10	8	23.3	.393	.222	.875	8.2	.7	1.0	1.5	8.1
Charlie Brown Jr.	10	0	4.0	.316	.333	1.000	.4	.2	.2	.2	2.0
Chandler Parsons	5	0	10.8	.278	.286		1.4	.6	.8	.2	2.8
Paul Watson^{†}	2	0	8.5	.000	.000		1.0	1.5	.5	.0	.0

- ^{†} Denotes player spent time with another team in the season. Stats reflect time with the Hawks only.

== Transactions ==
=== Trades ===
June
June 19	To Atlanta Hawks: 2024 MIA protected second-round pick	To Miami Heat: Draft rights to Bol Bol (#44); Cash considerations
June 20	To Atlanta Hawks: 2024 GSW second-round pick; Cash considerations	To Golden State Warriors: Draft rights to Eric Paschall (#41)
June 24	To Atlanta Hawks: Evan Turner	To Portland Trail Blazers: Kent Bazemore
July 6	To Atlanta Hawks: Allen Crabbe; Draft rights to Nickeil Alexander-Walker (#17); 2020 BKN protected first-round pick (Note: Atlanta will receive the pick if it's #15-30, else it will roll over through 2022 with the same condition.)	To Brooklyn Nets: Taurean Prince; 2021 ATL second-round pick
July 6	To Atlanta Hawks: Solomon Hill; Draft rights To De'Andre Hunter (#4); Draft rights To Jordan Bone (#57); 2023 second-round pick	To New Orleans Pelicans: Draft rights To Jaxson Hayes (#8); Draft rights To Nickeil Alexander-Walker (#17); Draft rights To Marcos Louzada Silva (#35); 2020 protected first-round pick
July 6	To Atlanta Hawks: Draft rights To Bruno Fernando (#34)	To Philadelphia 76ers: Draft rights To Jordan Bone (#57); 2 future second-round picks
July 7	To Atlanta Hawks: Chandler Parsons	To Memphis Grizzlies: Solomon Hill; Miles Plumlee
July 8	To Atlanta Hawks: Damian Jones; 2026 GSW second-round pick	To Golden State Warriors: Omari Spellman
January
January 16	To Atlanta Hawks: Jeff Teague; Treveon Graham	To Minnesota Timberwolves: Allen Crabbe

=== Free agents ===
==== Re-signed ====
Player	Signed
Vince Carter	1 Year, $2.3 Million (September 20)

==== Additions ====
Player	Signed	Former Team
Charlie Brown Jr.	Two-Way Contract (July 1)	Saint Joseph's Hawks
Jabari Parker	2 Year, $13 Million (July 8)	Washington Wizards
Ray Spalding	1 Year, $1.4 Million (July 31)	Phoenix Suns
Brandon Goodwin	Two-Way Contract (August 6)	Denver Nuggets

==== Subtractions ====
Player	Reason left	New team
Deyonta Davis	Waived	Houston Rockets
Dewayne Dedmon	Free Agent	Sacramento Kings
Justin Anderson	Free Agent	Washington Wizards
Isaac Humphries	Free Agent	
Alex Poythress	Free Agent	Jilin Northeast Tigers (China)
Jaylen Adams	Waived	Milwaukee Bucks
