= Lloyd Pierce =

American basketball coach (born 1976)

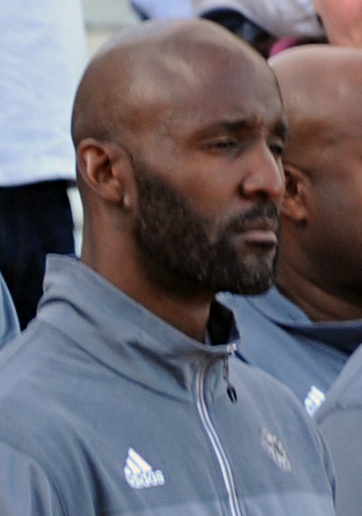
- Pierce in 2016

Indiana Pacers
- Position: Assistant coach
- League: NBA

Personal information
- Born: May 11, 1976 (age 50) San Jose, California, U.S.
- Listed height: 6 ft 1 in (1.85 m)

Career information
- High school: Yerba Buena (San Jose, California)
- College: Santa Clara (1994–1998)
- NBA draft: 1998: undrafted
- Playing career: 1998–2002
- Coaching career: 2003–present

Career history

Playing
- 1998–1999: Billings RimRockers
- 1999: Soles de Jalisco
- 2000: Mount Gambier Pioneers
- 2001–2002: SV 03 Tübingen

Coaching
- 2003–2007: Santa Clara (assistant)
- 2007–2010: Cleveland Cavaliers (assistant)
- 2010–2011: Golden State Warriors (assistant)
- 2011–2013: Memphis Grizzlies (assistant)
- 2013–2018: Philadelphia 76ers (assistant)
- 2018–2021: Atlanta Hawks
- 2021–present: Indiana Pacers (assistant)

Lloyd Daniel Pierce (born May 11, 1976) is an American basketball coach who serves as the lead assistant coach for the Indiana Pacers of the National Basketball Association (NBA). He has previously coached for the Philadelphia 76ers, Memphis Grizzlies, Cleveland Cavaliers, Golden State Warriors, and Atlanta Hawks. In addition to coaching, he has also played internationally.

== Playing career ==
Pierce made the varsity of Yerba Buena High School as a freshman in 1990. He loved playing defense and was considered one of the best-ever players from the San Jose area. He earned a full basketball scholarship to Santa Clara University.

With future NBA players Steve Nash and Marlon Garnett, the Santa Clara Broncos made the NCAA Division I men's basketball tournament three times in four years from 1993 to 1996. Pierce helped guide the Broncos to the 1995 and 1996 NCAA tournaments (his freshman and sophomore seasons), advancing to the NCAA 2nd Round in 1996. He was an honorable mention for all-West Coast Conference and averaged 7.1 points, 3.4 rebounds, 2.0 assists and 1.0 steal per game during his college playing years.

Pierce played professionally for four seasons in Mexico, Australia, Germany, and Turkey.

== Coaching career ==
=== Santa Clara University ===
Pierce started coaching by serving as a volunteer for the position of director of basketball operations at Santa Clara in the 2002–03 season. He was part of Dick Davey's staff until 2007. In 2016, he would become a finalist for the Santa Clara University Broncos head coaching job.

=== Cleveland Cavaliers ===
Pierce served as the coordinator for player development for the Cleveland Cavaliers from 2007 to 2010.

=== Golden State Warriors ===
Pierce was an assistant coach with the Golden State Warriors during the 2010–11 season under head coach Keith Smart.

=== Memphis Grizzlies ===
Pierce began coaching the Memphis Grizzlies in 2011 and worked under head coach Lionel Hollins. He was also part of the player development staff.

=== Philadelphia 76ers ===
Pierce joined the Philadelphia 76ers just before the 2013–14 season. He would be involved with the team throughout the next few seasons, becoming in charge of the team's defense and being involved in playcalling during timeouts.

=== Atlanta Hawks ===
On May 11, 2018, Pierce was hired by the Atlanta Hawks as head coach. The Hawks fired Pierce on March 1, 2021, after the team's 14–20 start to the season.

=== Indiana Pacers ===
Following his departure from Atlanta, Pierce was hired as the lead assistant coach for the Indiana Pacers.

== Head coaching record ==
Legend
Regular season	G	Games coached	W	Games won	L	Games lost	W–L %	Win–loss %
Playoffs	PG	Playoff games	PW	Playoff wins	PL	Playoff losses	PW–L %	Playoff win–loss %

Team	Year	G	W	L	W–L%	Finish	PG	PW	PL	PW–L%	Result
Atlanta	2018–19	82	29	53	.354	5th in Southeast	—	—	—	—	Missed playoffs
Atlanta	2019–20	67	20	47	.299	5th in Southeast	—	—	—	—	Missed playoffs
Atlanta	2020–21	34	14	20	.412	(fired)	—	—	—	—	—
Career		183	63	120	.344		—	—	—	—	

== Personal life ==
Pierce graduated from Santa Clara University with a degree in business management. After graduation, he was a special education teacher for Pinnacle Academy in Santa Clara and also worked for a local financial services firm.

He married his wife Melissa in 2015 and the two first had a child in 2018. Pierce missed three games of the 2020–21 season due to birth of his second child.
