= John Collins (basketball) =

American basketball player (born 1997)

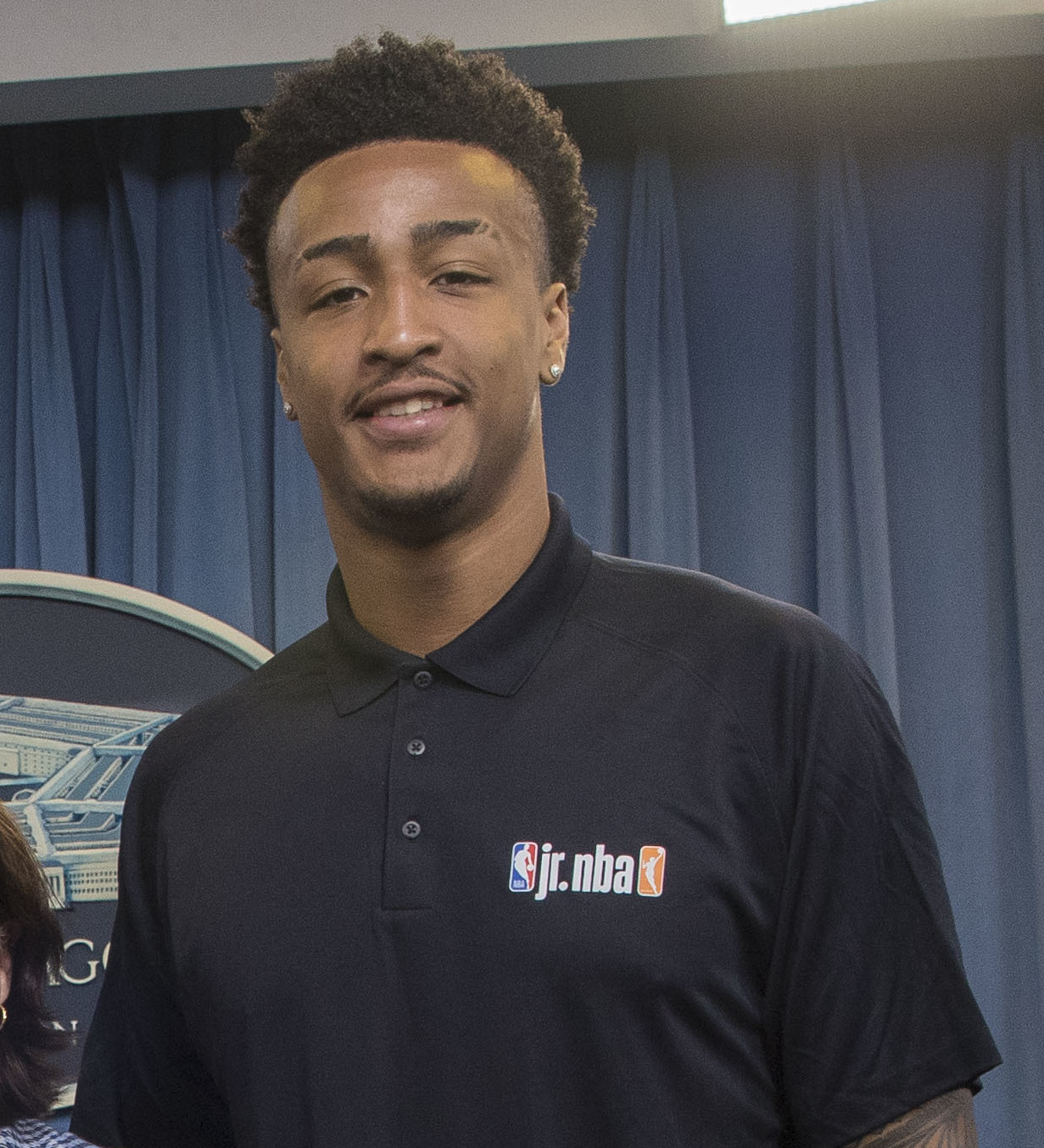
- Collins in 2019

No. 20 – Detroit Pistons
- Position: Power forward / center
- League: NBA

Personal information
- Born: September 23, 1997 (age 29) Layton, Utah, U.S.
- Listed height: 6 ft 9 in (2.06 m)
- Listed weight: 226 lb (103 kg)

Career information
- High school: Cardinal Newman (West Palm Beach, Florida)
- College: Wake Forest (2015–2017)
- NBA draft: 2017: 1st round, 19th overall pick
- Drafted by: Atlanta Hawks
- Playing career: 2017–present

Career history
- 2017–2023: Atlanta Hawks
- 2023–2025: Utah Jazz
- 2025–2026: Los Angeles Clippers
- 2026–present: Detroit Pistons

Career highlights
- NBA All-Rookie Second Team (2018); First-team All-ACC (2017); ACC Most Improved Player (2017)
- Stats at NBA.com
- Stats at Basketball Reference

John Martin Collins III (born September 23, 1997) is an American professional basketball player for the Detroit Pistons of the National Basketball Association (NBA). He played college basketball for the Wake Forest Demon Deacons. Collins was selected with the 19th overall pick by the Atlanta Hawks in the 2017 NBA draft. He has also played for the Utah Jazz and the Los Angeles Clippers.

== Early life ==
Collins was born in Layton, Utah, to John Collins Jr. and Lyria Rissing-Collins. His father served in the Navy and his mother was in the Air Force. As a result, the family moved a lot during Collins' youth, spending time in the Virgin Islands, Guam, and Turkey. He regularly played soccer as a teenager on his mother's military bases. He is a big Premier League football fan, and an avid supporter of London team Chelsea.

Collins attended Cardinal Newman High School in West Palm Beach, Florida. While at Newman, he was a three-time letter winner and was named the Florida Class 4A Player of the Year his senior year. On November 13, 2014, he signed a letter of intent to play college basketball at Wake Forest, joining fellow 2015 prospects Bryant Crawford and Doral Moore.

== College career ==
Collins appeared in all 31 of his team's game during his freshman year. He led the team in field goal accuracy at 54.7%.

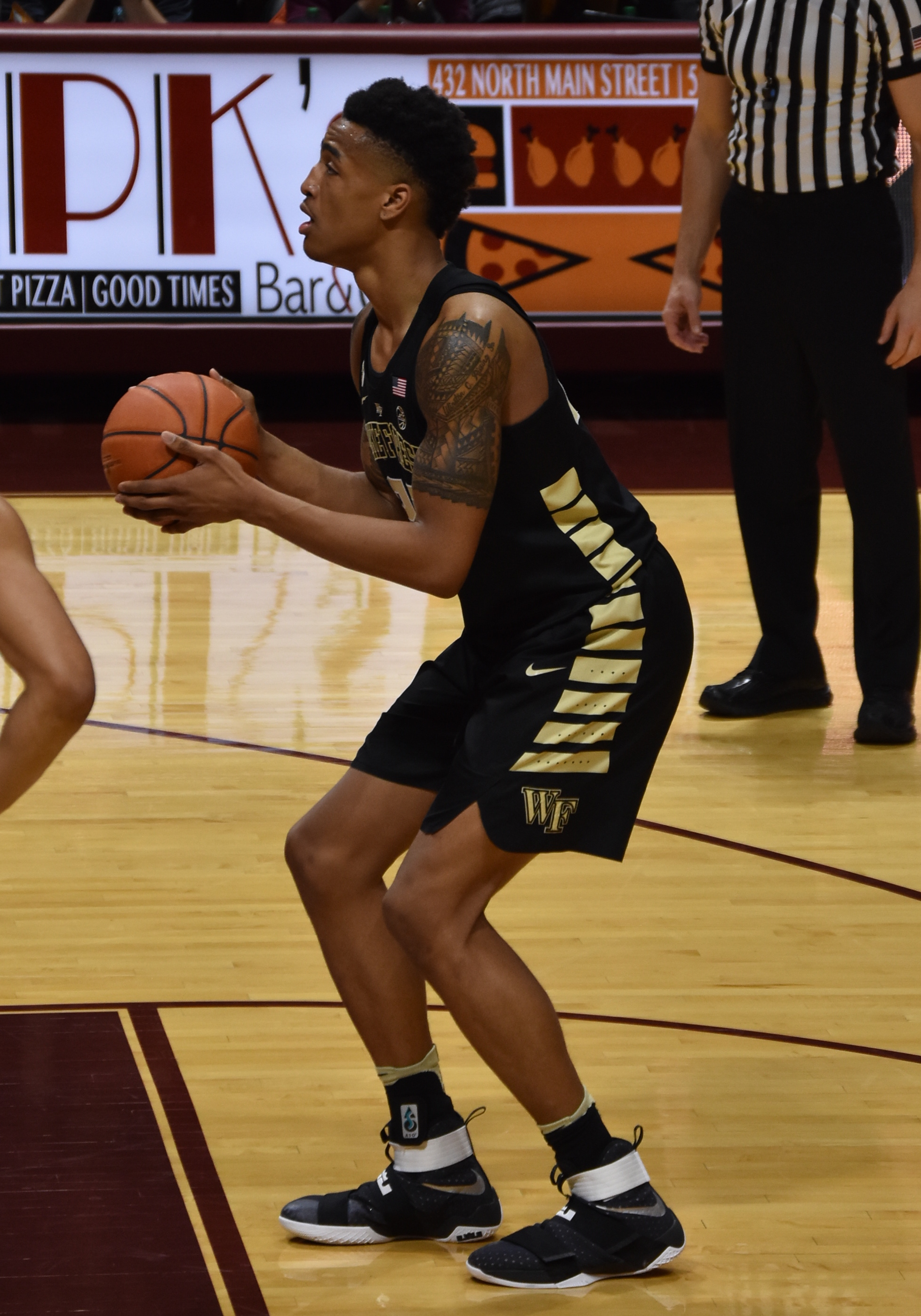
Collins at the free throw line in 2017

On January 18, 2017, Collins scored 27 points and 7 rebounds in a 96–79 win against Miami. On January 21, 2017, Collins scored 21 points and 9 rebounds in a 93–88 win over NC State. On January 23, 2017, Collins was named Atlantic Coast Conference (ACC) player of the week. On January 31, 2017, Collins scored 26 points and 16 rebounds in an 85–80 victory against Boston College. On February 4, 2017, Collins scored a double-double of 20 points and 11 rebounds in an 81–69 win over Georgia Tech. On February 20, 2017, Collins earned ACC Player of the week honors for the second consecutive time. On February 22, 2017, Collins scored 22 points and 13 rebounds in a 63–59 win against Pittsburgh. On March 2, 2017, Collins scored 25 points and 11 rebounds in an 88–81 win against No.8 ranked Louisville. As a starter his sophomore year, Collins led Wake Forest in scoring and rebounding with 19.2 points per game and 9.8 rebounds a game. Collins also led the ACC in field goal percentage and 20 point and 10 rebound games (10). Collins streak of 20 point games for 12 consecutive times is the longest ever by a Wake Forest player, while also becoming the first to score 600 points and 300 in a season since former Demon Deacon and NBA Hall of Famer Tim Duncan did it during the 1996–97 season. His performance earned him recognition as the ACC Most Improved Player and he was named first-team all-ACC.

After the season ended, Collins entered his name in the 2017 NBA draft, forgoing his final two years of eligibility.

== Professional career ==
=== Atlanta Hawks (2017–2023) ===
On June 22, 2017, Collins was selected with the nineteenth overall pick in the 2017 NBA draft by the Atlanta Hawks. On July 1, 2017, he signed a rookie-scaled deal with the Hawks. During the 2017 NBA Summer League, he earned All-Summer League First Team honors due to his performances with the Hawks, which gave him averages of 15.4 points, 9.2 rebounds, and 1.0 assists per game in 23.1 minutes of action in the five games he played there. His highlight play was him dunking on Pelicans center Cheick Diallo. Collins later saw action in all five preseason games for the Hawks, coming off the bench with per game averages of 7.6 points, 7.0 rebounds, and 0.6 assists in 19.2 minutes.

On October 22, 2017, in his third ever NBA game, Collins recorded his first career double-double with 14 points and 13 rebounds in a 116–104 loss to the Brooklyn Nets. He followed it up the very next night with another double-double performance against the Miami Heat, getting 14 points and 11 rebounds in a 104–93 loss.

Due to an injury to Luke Babbitt, Collins played 36 minutes and scored a career high 21 points in a 96–85 losing effort to the San Antonio Spurs on November 20, 2017. With Babbitt still sidelined, Collins drew his first career start two days later against the Los Angeles Clippers. Although the Hawks ended up losing 116–103, he impressed with 14 points, 10 rebounds, 3 assists, and 4 steals in a career high 38 minutes. Late in the November 30 loss against the Cleveland Cavaliers, Collins suffered a shoulder injury and was expected to be out for 2 to 3 weeks. He made his return on December 14 to play the Detroit Pistons, missing a total of six games.

By the trade deadline on February 8, 2018, the Hawks had a losing record of 17–37. With the postseason out of reach, Collins saw an increase in minutes and made his fifth start of the season on February 14 in a rematch with the Pistons. Other than two missed games in March due to an ankle injury, he started for the Hawks the rest of the season. Although Atlanta managed just 24 wins, Collins averaged 10.5 points and 7.3 rebounds per game on 57.6% shooting while tallying 11 double-doubles in his rookie season. On May 22, 2018, he was named to the NBA All-Rookie Second Team.

On January 23, 2019, Collins recorded a career high 35 points in a 121–101 win over the Chicago Bulls. On April 10, 2019, he scored 20 points and recorded a career-high 25 rebounds in a 135–134 loss to the Indiana Pacers in the Hawks' season finale.

On November 5, 2019, Collins was suspended by the NBA for 25 games without pay for violating the league's anti-drug policy. He tested positive for pralmorelin, a growth hormone-releasing peptide 2 (GHRP-2).

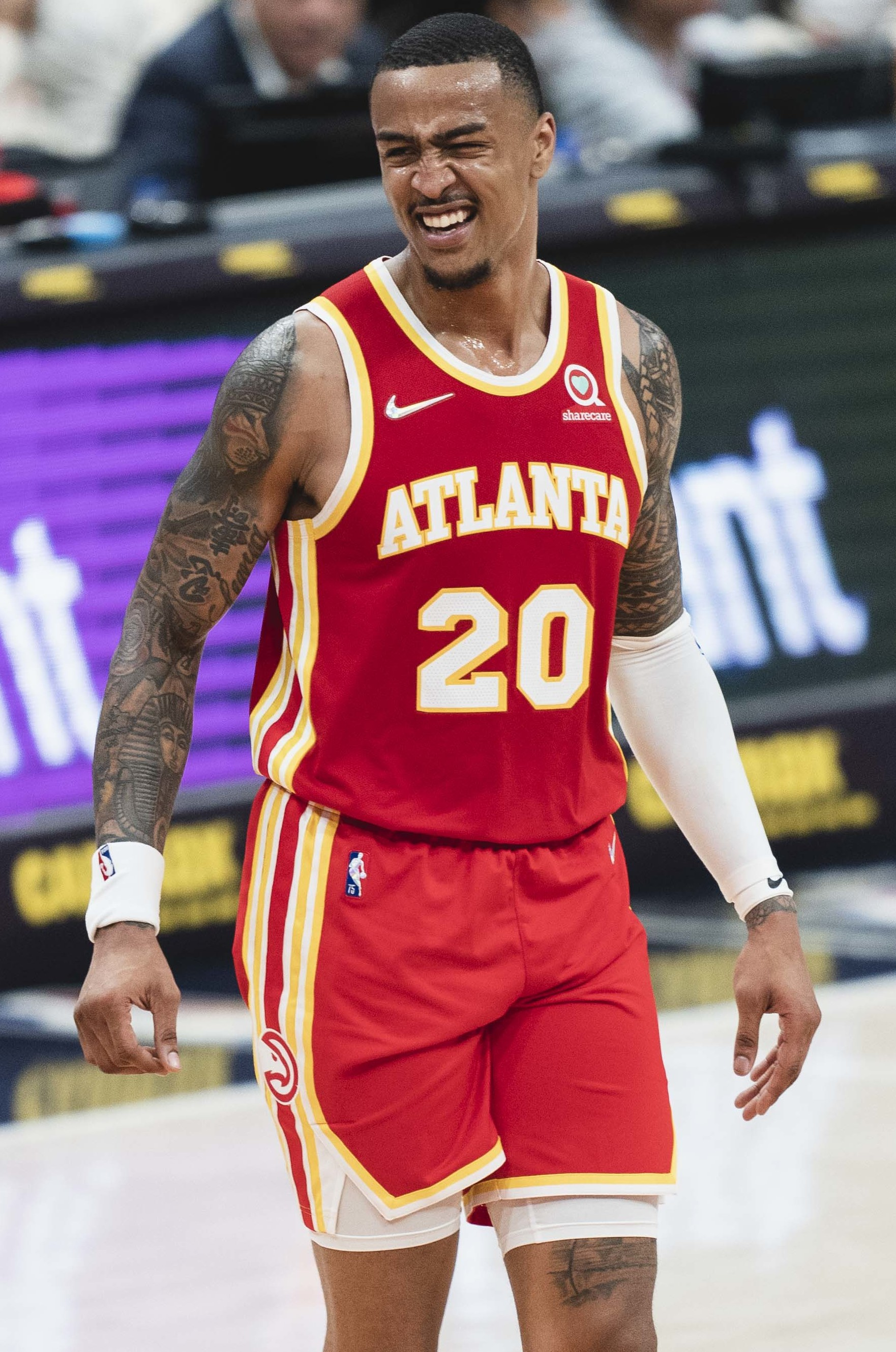
Collins with the Hawks in 2021

On December 23, 2019, Collins returned from his suspension and recorded a double-double scoring 27 points and grabbing 10 rebounds in a 121–118 loss to the Cleveland Cavaliers. On January 22, 2020, Collins scored 33 points and 16 rebounds in a 102–95 victory over the Los Angeles Clippers. On February 5, 2020, Collins put up 27 points and 12 rebounds in a 127–120 win over the Minnesota Timberwolves. On February 22, 2020, he tied his career high in points scoring 35 points and grabbing 17 rebounds in a 111–107 win against the Dallas Mavericks. On March 9, 2020, Collins scored 28 points and grabbed 11 rebounds in a 143–138 double–overtime win against the Charlotte Hornets.

The Atlanta Hawks formally signed Collins to a five-year contract worth $125 million on August 6, 2021.

On January 13, 2023, Collins made a buzzer-beating, game-winning tip-in in a 113–111 win over the Indiana Pacers.

=== Utah Jazz (2023–2025) ===
On July 7, 2023, Collins was traded to his hometown team the Utah Jazz in exchange for Rudy Gay and a future second-round pick.

=== Los Angeles Clippers (2025–2026) ===
On July 7, 2025, two years to the day after being traded to the Utah Jazz, Collins was traded to the Los Angeles Clippers in a three-team transaction. Utah acquired Kevin Love and Kyle Anderson from the Miami Heat, and a 2nd-round pick from the Clippers. Norman Powell was traded from Los Angeles to Miami, and Collins was traded from Utah to Los Angeles.

=== Detroit Pistons (2026–present) ===
On July 8, 2026, Collins signed a three-year, $51 million contract with the Detroit Pistons via a sign-and-trade. The signing came as part of a trade that involved six teams. On October 20, he made his Pistons debut, recording six points and five rebounds in a 121–113 win over the Boston Celtics.

== Career statistics ==
Legend
GP	Games played	GS	Games started	MPG	Minutes per game
FG%	Field goal percentage	3P%	3-point field goal percentage	FT%	Free throw percentage
RPG	Rebounds per game	APG	Assists per game	SPG	Steals per game
BPG	Blocks per game	PPG	Points per game	**Bold**	Career high

=== NBA ===
==== Regular season ====
Year	Team	GP	GS	MPG	FG%	3P%	FT%	RPG	APG	SPG	BPG	PPG
2017–18	Atlanta	**74**	26	24.1	.576	.340	.715	7.3	1.3	.6	1.1	10.5
2018–19	Atlanta	61	59	30.0	.560	.348	.763	9.8	**2.0**	.4	.6	19.5
2019–20	Atlanta	41	41	**33.2**	**.583**	.401	.800	**10.1**	1.5	.8	**1.6**	**21.6**
2020–21	Atlanta	63	63	29.3	.556	.399	.833	7.4	1.2	.5	1.0	17.6
2021–22	Atlanta	54	53	30.8	.526	.364	.793	7.8	1.8	.6	1.0	16.2
2022–23	Atlanta	71	**71**	30.0	.508	.292	.803	6.5	1.2	.6	1.0	13.1
2023–24	Utah	68	66	28.0	.532	.371	.795	8.5	1.1	.6	.9	15.1
2024–25	Utah	40	31	30.5	.527	.399	**.848**	8.2	**2.0**	**1.0**	1.0	19.0
2025–26	L.A. Clippers	69	56	27.1	.552	**.406**	.766	5.3	1.0	.9	.7	13.6
Career		541	466	28.9	.546	.369	.789	7.7	1.4	.6	1.0	15.7

==== Playoffs ====
Year	Team	GP	GS	MPG	FG%	3P%	FT%	RPG	APG	SPG	BPG	PPG
2021	Atlanta	**18**	**18**	**32.0**	**.549**	.357	**.833**	**8.7**	.9	**.4**	.6	**13.9**
2022	Atlanta	5	4	24.3	.487	**.364**	.500	4.6	**1.2**	**.4**	.2	9.4
2023	Atlanta	6	6	27.4	.433	.344	**.833**	4.3	.8	.3	**1.0**	11.3
Career		29	28	29.7	.516	.354	.769	7.1	.9	.4	.6	12.6

=== College ===
Year	Team	GP	GS	MPG	FG%	3P%	FT%	RPG	APG	SPG	BPG	PPG
2015–16	Wake Forest	31	1	14.4	.547	–	.691	3.9	.2	.3	.7	7.3
2016–17	Wake Forest	**33**	**33**	**26.6**	**.622**	.000	**.745**	**9.8**	**.5**	**.6**	**1.6**	**19.2**
Career		64	34	20.7	.601	.000	.729	7.0	.4	.5	1.2	13.4

== Personal life ==
Collins is an avid fan of anime, and has openly spoken on it. His favorite anime is Naruto and his favorite character from the franchise is Kakashi Hatake, he's even dressed up as Kakashi for his tunnel outfits and even has a custom Kakashi pendant which was commissioned from Icebox Jewelers. Furthermore, Collins cited Rock Lee from the franchise as his source of inspiration to do better as a basketball player.

== See also ==
- List of NBA career field goal percentage leaders
- List of people banned or suspended by the NBA
