= Alex Len =

Ukrainian basketball player (born 1993)

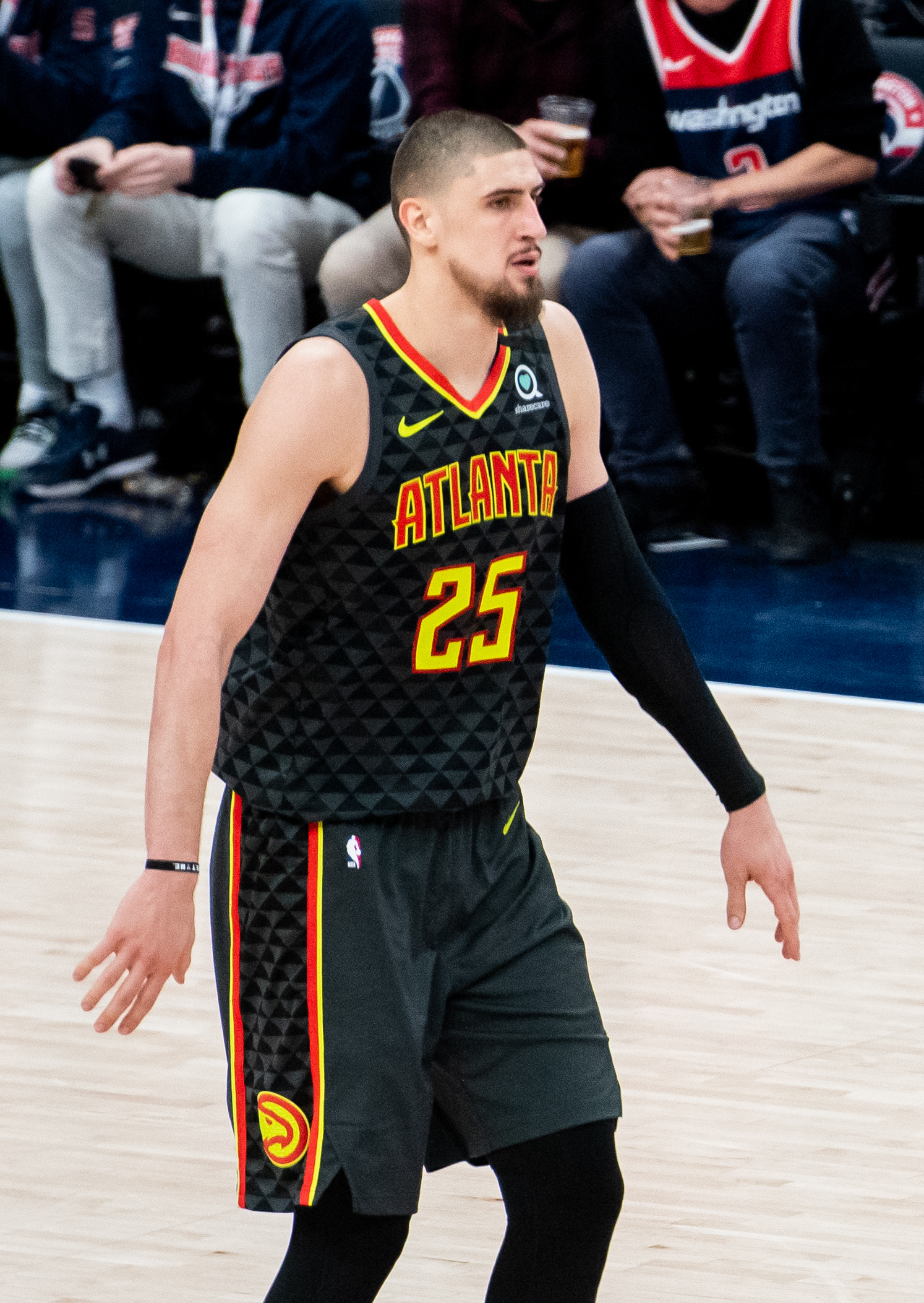
- Len with the Atlanta Hawks in 2020

Free agent
- Position: Center

Personal information
- Born: June 16, 1993 (age 33) Antratsyt, Ukraine
- Listed height: 7 ft 0 in (2.13 m)
- Listed weight: 250 lb (113 kg)

Career information
- High school: Dnipro Higher College (Dnipro, Ukraine)
- College: Maryland (2011–2013)
- NBA draft: 2013: 1st round, 5th overall pick
- Drafted by: Phoenix Suns
- Playing career: 2010–2011; 2013–present

Career history
- 2010–2011: Dnipro
- 2013–2018: Phoenix Suns
- 2018–2020: Atlanta Hawks
- 2020: Sacramento Kings
- 2020–2021: Toronto Raptors
- 2021: Washington Wizards
- 2021–2025: Sacramento Kings
- 2025: Los Angeles Lakers
- 2025–2026: Real Madrid

Career highlights
- Ukrainian Cup winner (2011)
- Stats at NBA.com
- Stats at Basketball Reference

Oleksii Yuriyovych Len (Ukrainian: Олексій Юрійович Лень; born June 16, 1993), commonly known as Alex Len (Ukrainian: Алекс Лень), is a Ukrainian professional basketball player who last played for Real Madrid of the Liga ACB and the EuroLeague. Before being selected in the 2013 NBA draft by the Phoenix Suns, he played two seasons for the Maryland Terrapins (then in the Atlantic Coast Conference) as well as a season with Dnipro. Len has played twelve seasons in the National Basketball Association (NBA).

== Early life ==
Len was born in Antratsyt, Luhansk, Ukraine to a mother named Yuliia, who ran track early in her life. Growing up, Len participated in gymnastics and liked watching Jackie Chan films. As a young gymnast, Len was trained by Oleksii Stepanenko, who had also trained Olympic gold medalist Ihor Korobchynskyi. He started playing basketball at the age of 13 and later attended Dnipro Higher College in Dnipro, Ukraine. He played for the Ukraine national team at the 2009 FIBA Europe Under-16 Championship and the 2010 FIBA Europe Under-18 Championship, where during the 2010 tournament, he was the fourth-best overall scorer, second-best rebounder, and the best shot blocker. Following the tournament, Len joined BC Dnipro of the Ukrainian Basketball SuperLeague for the 2010–11 season.

== College career ==
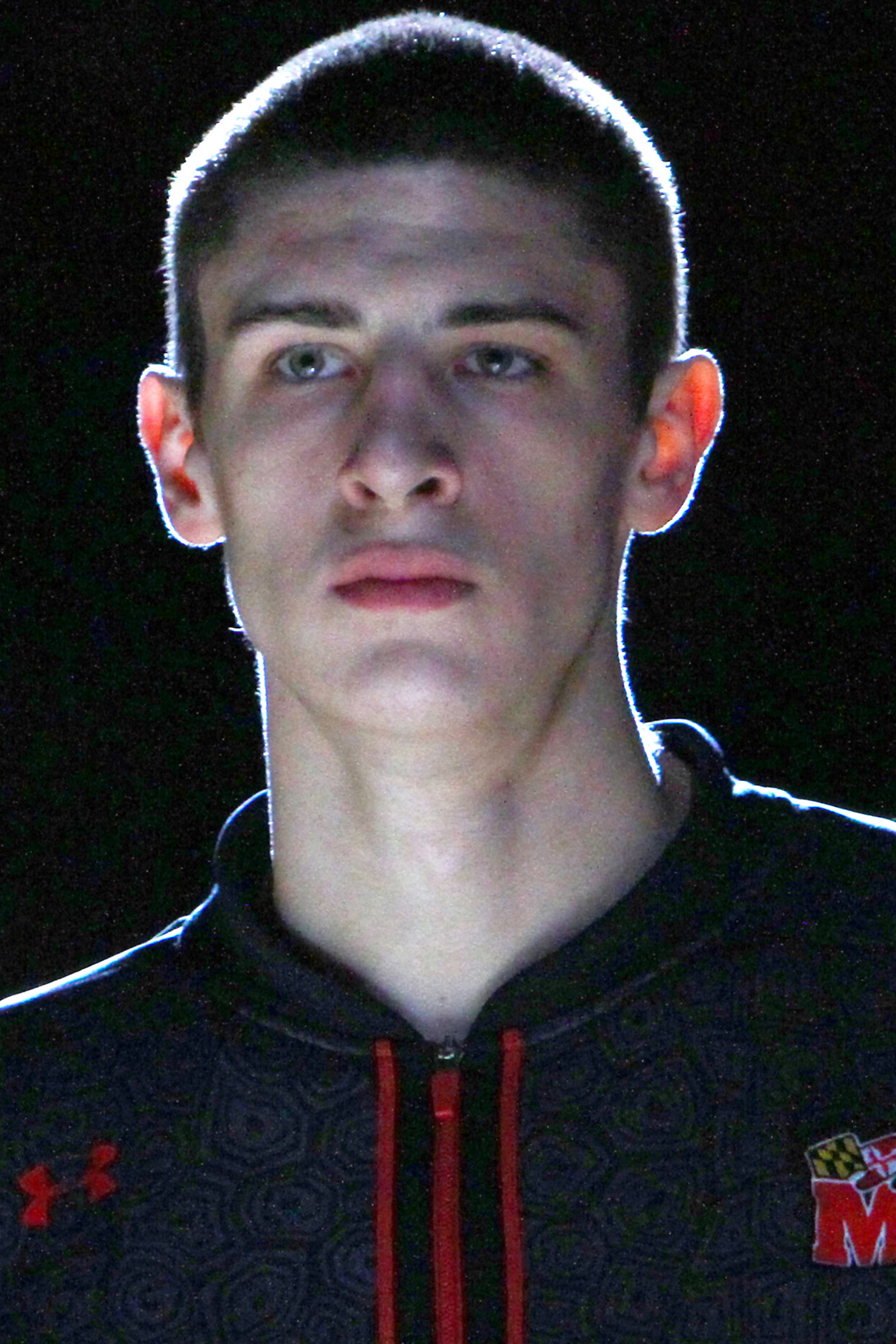
Len in 2012

Len was recruited by then Maryland assistant basketball coach, Scott Spinelli. He was the recipient of an athletic scholarship from the University of Maryland coach Gary Williams, but Williams resigned after the 2010–11 season. Mark Turgeon was hired to take his place. While Williams began recruiting Len, it was Turgeon and Spinelli who eventually lured him to Maryland. Len underachieved in his freshman year, averaging 6 points, 5.5 rebounds, and 2.2 blocks per game, but showed lottery pick potential after serving a ten game suspension at the beginning of the year due to NCAA amateurism issues resulting from his play with BC Dnipro, a European club team from his home nation.

Len opened his sophomore season on November 9, 2012, against the reigning champion Kentucky Wildcats, led by ESPN's #1 player of the 2012 recruiting class, Nerlens Noel. The game was played at the brand-new Barclays Center in Brooklyn. Len overpowered Noel throughout the entire game, scoring 23 points with 12 rebounds and 4 blocks, while holding Noel to just four points, although Kentucky won the game 72–69. Following the game, there was talk that Len could potentially be a top 5 pick in the upcoming draft. On January 16, 2013, Len scored 10 points, including a game-winning shot with 0.9 seconds in the game, upsetting #14 North Carolina State with a 52–50 win. On February 16, 2013, Len played a role in Maryland's 83–81 victory over the top ranked Duke Blue Devils. Len put up 19 points, 9 rebounds and 3 blocks, while holding Duke star senior Mason Plumlee to four points. He went on to average 11.9 points per game in 38 total games that season.

On April 14, 2013, Len decided to declare for the 2013 NBA draft. He was projected to land in the lottery, with some experts projecting Len as the #1 overall pick. On May 3, 2013, Len ended up getting surgery on his left ankle that resulted in him being out for several months, ultimately causing him to sit out from the 2013 NBA Summer League.

== Professional career ==
=== Phoenix Suns (2013–2018) ===
==== 2013–14 season ====
Len was selected fifth overall by the Phoenix Suns in the 2013 NBA draft. Len was the second international-born player to be selected in that draft, behind the first overall selection in Canadian-born Anthony Bennett, as well as the highest-selected Ukrainian-born player to be drafted in the NBA, which was a record previously held by Vitalii Potapenko in 1996. He was also the first Suns player to be taken in the top 5 of an NBA draft since Armen Gilliam in 1987. Due to his ankle surgeries, Len did not join the Suns for the 2013 NBA Summer League. On July 12, 2013, Len had surgery on his right ankle due to a stress fracture. He signed with the Suns on August 29, 2013, and was cleared to practice with them by early September.

Len made his NBA debut on November 1, 2013, at home in a close victory against the Utah Jazz. He sat out seven games before returning on November 19 against the Sacramento Kings. However, a day later, Len re-injured his left knee and missed over six weeks before returning on January 7 against the Chicago Bulls. Len had his first 10-rebound game in a 126–117 win over the Milwaukee Bucks on January 29, 2014.

==== 2014–15 season ====
In July 2014, Len joined the Phoenix Suns for the 2014 NBA Summer League. In the Suns' first game of the Summer League, Len recorded 6 points and 6 rebounds against the Golden State Warriors before fracturing his right pinkie finger and was subsequently ruled out until training camp. On October 7, 2014, a day before the Suns' first pre-season game of 2014 against Brazilian club Flamengo, Len fractured the same pinkie finger again, forcing him to the sidelines once more. He returned to action two weeks later in the Suns' pre-season game against the Los Angeles Clippers on October 22.

On October 31, 2014, Len recorded his first career double-double with career-highs in points and rebounds with 10 and 11, respectively, in the Suns' 94–89 win over the San Antonio Spurs. On November 17, he scored a then career-high 19 points in a 118–114 win over the Boston Celtics. Len started his first game on December 15 against the Milwaukee Bucks and continued to start for the Suns until February 5 when injured his ankle after a failed alley-oop attempt in the third quarter against the Portland Trail Blazers. After missing three games due to the injury, he returned to action on February 20 to record 11 points, 10 rebounds and a career-high six blocks in a loss to the Minnesota Timberwolves. On April 2, he underwent successful surgery to repair his broken nose, an injury he suffered against the Portland Trail Blazers on March 30. He subsequently missed the final seven games of the season.

==== 2015–16 season ====
In July 2015, Len re-joined the Suns for the 2015 NBA Summer League in Las Vegas where in five games, he averaged 10.8 points and 9.8 rebounds per game. Following the conclusion of the Summer League, Len began training with his new teammate Tyson Chandler, as well as rival center and one of Len's personal favorite players, Tim Duncan, throughout the off-season. On December 9, Len recorded a then career-high 20 points and 14 rebounds in a 107–104 win over the Orlando Magic. On January 11, he was ruled out for three games with a left hand sprain. On February 4, he recorded 12 points and a career-high 18 rebounds in a 111–105 loss to the Houston Rockets. On February 21, he recorded a then career-high 23 points and 13 rebounds in a 118–111 loss to the San Antonio Spurs. He went on to set a new career high on March 4, recording 31 points along with 15 rebounds in a 102–84 win over the Orlando Magic. Two days later, Len recorded 19 points, 16 rebounds and a career-high 6 assists in a 109–100 win over the Memphis Grizzlies. On March 17, he recorded his 10th straight game with 10+ rebounds. On April 7, he recorded a career-high seven assists in a 124–115 win over the Houston Rockets. Len appeared in 78 games for the Suns in 2015–16, starting in 46 of them, both career highs. He recorded 19 double-doubles and finished with averages of 9.0 points, 7.6 rebounds and 1.2 assists, all career highs.

==== 2016–17 season ====
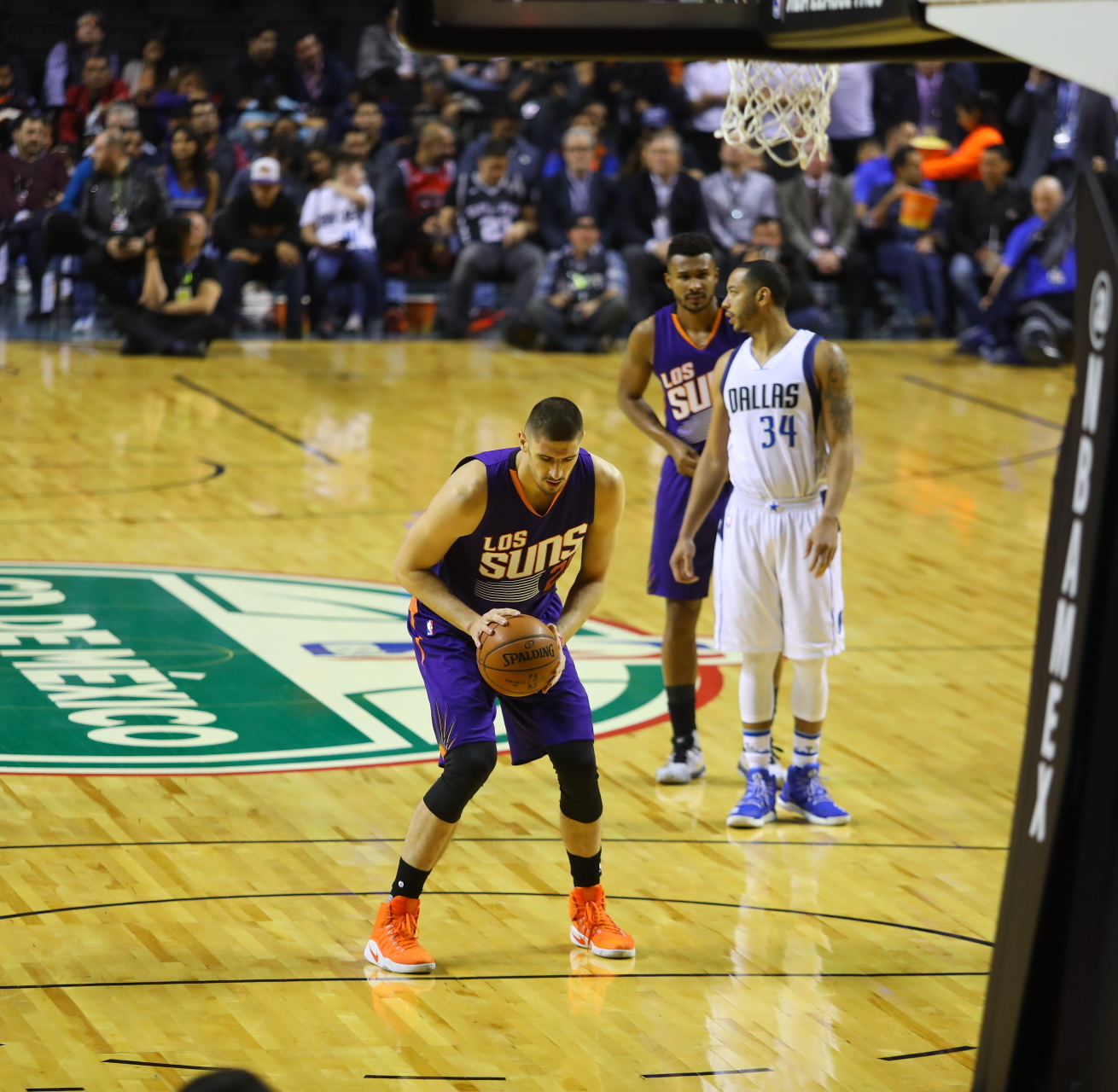
Len preparing to shoot a free throw in January 2017

After going 0–4 to start the season, Len helped the Suns record their first win on November 2 with 18 points in a 118–115 overtime victory over the Portland Trail Blazers. On November 8, he recorded 16 points and a season-high 14 rebounds in a 107–100 win over the Detroit Pistons. On December 9, he recorded 14 points, 13 rebounds and a season-high five blocks off the bench in a 119–115 win over the Los Angeles Lakers. On February 10, 2017, he was suspended one game without pay for leaving the bench area and entering the playing court during an altercation in the Suns' 110–91 loss to the Memphis Grizzlies two days earlier.

==== 2017–18 season ====
Following the 2016–17 season, Len became a restricted free agent. On September 25, 2017, after spending the off-season looking to get a better deal, Len signed a one-year, $4.2 million qualifying offer to return to the Suns. On November 17, 2017, Len had 17 points and 18 rebounds in a 122–113 win over the Los Angeles Lakers. On November 28, 2017, he tied a career high with 18 rebounds in a 104–99 win over the Chicago Bulls. On December 16, 2017, he had 12 points and a career-high 19 rebounds in a 108–106 win over the Minnesota Timberwolves. On March 2, 2018, he had six blocks in a 124–116 loss to the Oklahoma City Thunder.

=== Atlanta Hawks (2018–2020) ===
On August 3, 2018, Len signed a two-year, $8.5 million contract with the Atlanta Hawks. On December 23, 2018, he had 15 points and a season-high 17 rebounds in a 98–95 win over the Detroit Pistons. On March 3, 2019, he scored a then season-high 28 points with a career-high five 3-pointers in a 123–118 win over the Chicago Bulls. On April 7, he scored a career-high 33 points, including a career-best six 3-pointers, in a 115–107 loss to the Milwaukee Bucks.

=== Sacramento Kings (2020) ===
On February 6, 2020, Len and Jabari Parker were traded to the Sacramento Kings in exchange for Dewayne Dedmon and two second round picks.

=== Toronto Raptors (2020–2021) ===
On November 29, 2020, Len signed with the Toronto Raptors. He was waived by the Raptors on January 19, 2021, after 13 regular season games.

=== Washington Wizards (2021) ===
On January 23, 2021, Len signed with the Washington Wizards. In 57 appearances (40 starts) for Washington, he averaged 7.1 points, 4.4 rebounds, and 0.8 assists.

=== Second stint with Kings (2021–2025) ===
On August 13, 2021, Len signed with the Sacramento Kings. On January 7, 2022, Len recorded a season-high 18 points, alongside ten rebounds and two steals, in a 111–121 loss to the Denver Nuggets. He made 39 appearances (10 starts) for Sacramento during the 2021–22 NBA season, averaging 6.0 points, 4.1 rebounds, and 1.2 assists.

Len played in 26 games, including two starts, for the Kings during the 2022–23 NBA season, averaging 1.7 points, 2.3 rebounds, and 0.5 assists. He made 48 appearances for Sacramento in the 2023–24 NBA season, compiling averages of 2.5 points, 2.7 rebounds, and 1.0 assists.

On July 8, 2024, Len re-signed with the Kings. He made 36 appearances (three starts) for Sacramento during the 2024–25 NBA season, averaging 1.4 points, 1.8 rebounds, and 0.8 assists.

=== Los Angeles Lakers (2025) ===
On February 6, 2025, Len was traded back to the Washington Wizards in a multi-team deal. On February 11, Len was waived by the Wizards and later signed with the Los Angeles Lakers. He made 10 appearances (four starts) for Los Angeles, averaging 2.2 points, 3.1 rebounds, and 0.8 assists.

On September 16, 2025, Len signed an Exhibit 9 contract with the New York Knicks. He was waived by the Knicks prior to the start of the regular season on October 18.

=== Real Madrid (2025–2026) ===
On October 30, 2025, Len signed a multi-year contract with Real Madrid of the Liga ACB and the EuroLeague. On November 7, Len made his team debut in a 101–92 win against Barcelona in the EuroLeague. He played in 40 games for the team (21 games in the League ACB, 19 games in the EuroLeague), logging averages of 3.0 points, 2.0 rebounds, and 0.9 blocks. On July 7, 2026, Len and Real Madrid parted ways.

On September 14, 2026, Len signed a two-year deal with Baskonia of the Liga ACB and the EuroLeague. However, just a week later on 23 September 2026, Len and Baskonia agreed to part ways.

== National team career ==
Len played for Ukraine's Under-16 national team during the 2009 FIBA Europe Under-16 Championship. Despite his performance throughout the tournament, which included a 20-point outing against Israel and averaging 8.0 points, 4.8 rebounds, 1.6 assists, and being the second-best shot blocker in the tournament with 2.6 blocks per game, the Under-16 national team was relegated under the Division B section after the tournament for over a year's time. He played with his nation's Under-18 national team for the 2010 FIBA Europe Under-18 Championship. Unlike in the Under-16 Tournament he participated in back in 2009, Len helped the Under-18 team stay in the Division A tournaments for at least another year. His performance throughout the tournament led to the University of Maryland, along with a few other universities like Virginia Tech, gaining enough interest in him to get him on their team.

In August 2018, Len was named to play for the Ukraine national basketball team for the first time at the 2019 FIBA World Cup qualifiers in September. Throughout the qualifiers, he averaged approximately 10.5 points, 6 rebounds, and 1.5 assists per game, playing a key role as the team's starting center. His presence was important in Ukraine's competitive performances to qualify for the World Cup. Len has continued to represent Ukraine in subsequent international competitions, further establishing himself as a core player for the national team.

== Career statistics ==
Legend
GP	Games played	GS	Games started	MPG	Minutes per game
FG%	Field goal percentage	3P%	3-point field goal percentage	FT%	Free throw percentage
RPG	Rebounds per game	APG	Assists per game	SPG	Steals per game
BPG	Blocks per game	PPG	Points per game	**Bold**	Career high

=== NBA ===
==== Regular season ====
Year	Team	GP	GS	MPG	FG%	3P%	FT%	RPG	APG	SPG	BPG	PPG
2013–14	Phoenix	42	3	8.6	.423	—	.645	2.4	.1	.1	.4	2.0
2014–15	Phoenix	69	44	22.0	.507	.333	.702	6.6	.5	**.5**	**1.5**	6.3
2015–16	Phoenix	**78**	**46**	**23.3**	.423	.143	**.728**	**7.6**	**1.2**	**.5**	.8	9.0
2016–17	Phoenix	77	34	20.3	.497	.250	.721	6.6	.6	**.5**	1.3	8.0
2017–18	Phoenix	69	13	20.2	.566	.333	.684	7.5	**1.2**	.4	.9	8.5
2018–19	Atlanta	77	31	20.1	.494	.363	.648	5.5	1.1	.4	.9	**11.1**
2019–20	Atlanta	40	9	18.6	.546	.250	.630	5.8	1.1	**.5**	.8	8.7
2019–20	Sacramento	15	3	15.0	.593	**.667**	.708	6.1	.5	.2	1.0	5.9
2020–21	Toronto	7	2	10.8	.500	.500	.500	1.6	.4	.1	.9	2.3
2020–21	Washington	57	40	15.8	**.619**	.263	.636	4.4	.8	.3	1.0	7.1
2021–22	Sacramento	39	10	15.9	.534	.286	.651	4.1	**1.2**	.3	.6	6.0
2022–23	Sacramento	26	2	6.2	.533	.000	.688	2.3	.5	.2	.4	1.7
2023–24	Sacramento	48	0	9.3	.617	.000	.588	2.7	1.0	.2	.7	2.5
2024–25	Sacramento	36	3	7.2	.537	.167	.538	1.8	.8	.2	.5	1.4
2024–25	L.A. Lakers	10	4	12.2	.455	.333	.250	3.1	.8	.1	.3	2.2
Career		690	244	17.0	.510	.322	.678	5.3	.9	.4	.9	6.7

==== Playoffs ====
Year	Team	GP	GS	MPG	FG%	3P%	FT%	RPG	APG	SPG	BPG	PPG
2021	Washington	5	**3**	**8.4**	.571	—	.571	2.2	**.4**	**.2**	.0	**4.0**
2023	Sacramento	**7**	0	7.8	**.778**	—	**.833**	**2.9**	.1	.0	**.4**	2.7
2025	L.A. Lakers	2	0	2.0	.000	—	—	2.0	.0	.0	.0	.0
Career		14	3	7.1	.625	—	.692	2.5	.2	.1	.2	2.8

=== EuroLeague ===
Year	Team	GP	GS	MPG	FG%	3P%	FT%	RPG	APG	SPG	BPG	PPG	PIR
2025–26	Real Madrid	23	3	9.1	.541	.000	.767	2.0	0.3	0.1	0.6	3.0	3.7

=== College ===
Year	Team	GP	GS	MPG	FG%	3P%	FT%	RPG	APG	SPG	BPG	PPG
2011–12	Maryland	22	11	21.2	**.553**	.000	.587	5.4	.6	**.2**	**2.1**	6.0
2012–13	Maryland	**38**	**37**	**26.4**	.534	**.125**	**.686**	**7.8**	**1.0**	**.2**	**2.1**	**11.9**
Career		60	48	24.5	.538	.111	.663	7.0	.8	.2	2.1	9.7

== Personal life ==
In December 2015, Len and his mother, Yuliia, created the Len-d A Hand Foundation, a charity that helps reach out to the youth in Phoenix, Arizona and other surrounding areas. A strong swimmer, on April 25, 2016 he helped save his friend and a lifeguard from drowning at a beach in the Dominican Republic.
