= DeAndre' Bembry =

American basketball player (born 1994)

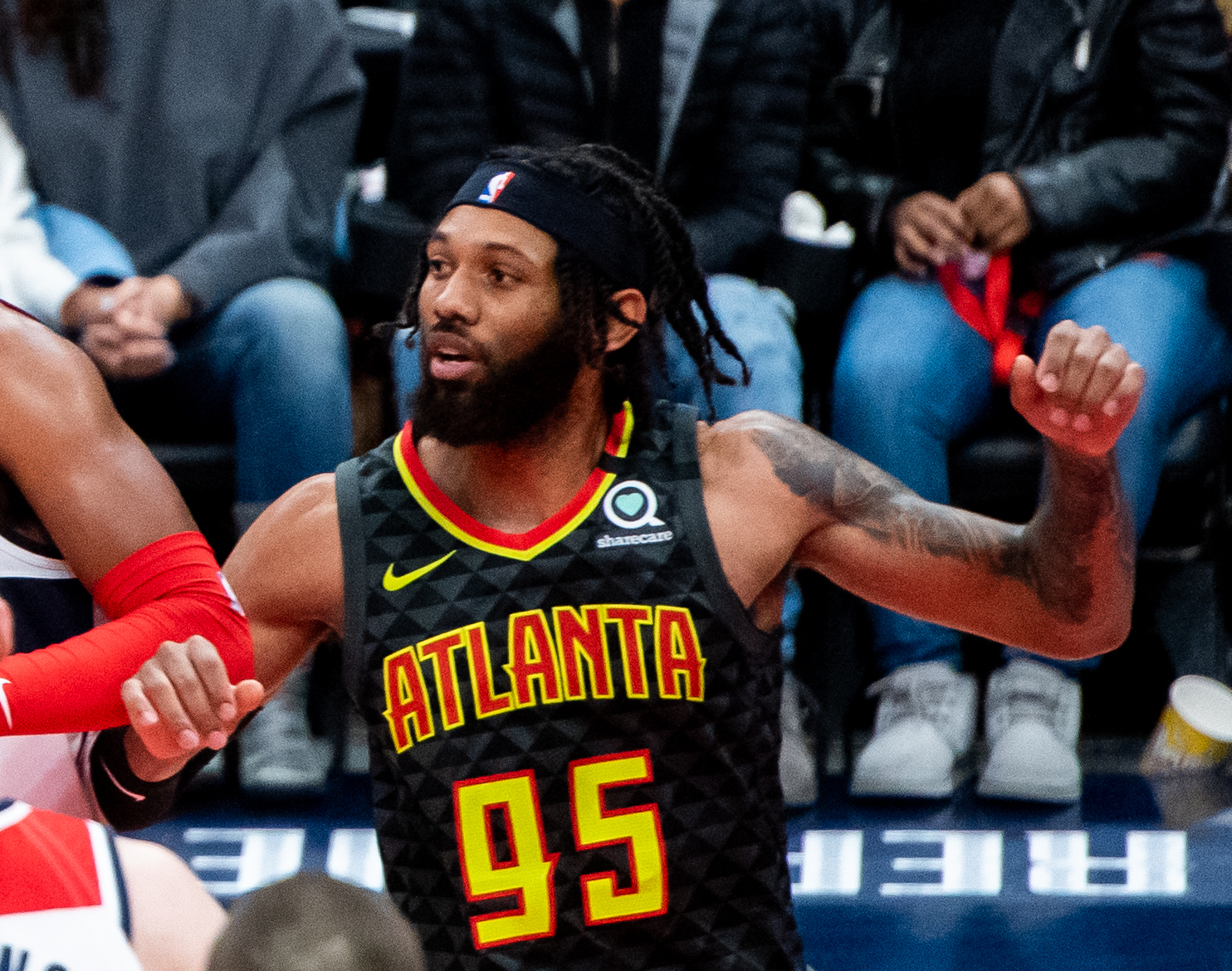
- Bembry with the Atlanta Hawks in 2020

Personal information
- Born: July 4, 1994 (age 32) Charlotte, North Carolina, U.S.
- Listed height: 6 ft 5 in (1.96 m)
- Listed weight: 210 lb (95 kg)

Career information
- High school: Rocky River (Mint Hill, North Carolina); St. Patrick (Elizabeth, New Jersey)
- College: Saint Joseph's (2013–2016)
- NBA draft: 2016: 1st round, 21st overall pick
- Drafted by: Atlanta Hawks
- Playing career: 2016–2022
- Position: Small forward / shooting guard
- Number: 95

Career history
- 2016–2020: Atlanta Hawks
- 2016–2017: →Salt Lake City Stars
- 2017–2018: →Erie BayHawks
- 2020–2021: Toronto Raptors
- 2021–2022: Brooklyn Nets
- 2022: Milwaukee Bucks

Career highlights
- AP Honorable Mention All-American (2016); Atlantic 10 Player of the Year (2016); 2× First-team All-Atlantic 10 (2015, 2016); Atlantic 10 All-Defensive Team (2016); Robert V. Geasey Trophy winner (2016)
- Stats at NBA.com
- Stats at Basketball Reference

DeAndre' Pierre' Bembry (born July 4, 1994) is an American former professional basketball player. He played college basketball for the Saint Joseph's Hawks, where he was named Atlantic 10 Conference Men's Basketball Player of the Year in 2016, becoming the first Hawk to receive the honor since Ahmad Nivins in 2009. Bembry was also named first-team All-Atlantic 10 for the second year in a row and was named to the All-Defensive Team. He was drafted 21st overall in the 2016 NBA draft by the Atlanta Hawks, and played for the Hawks, Toronto Raptors, Brooklyn Nets and Milwaukee Bucks in his NBA career.

== High school career ==
Bembry attended Rocky River High School in Mint Hill, North Carolina before transferring to St. Patrick High School in Elizabeth, New Jersey where he averaged 21.8 points and 9.0 rebounds as a senior, earning a New Jersey All-State First Team selection and being named the 2013 Union County Player of the Year.

== College career ==
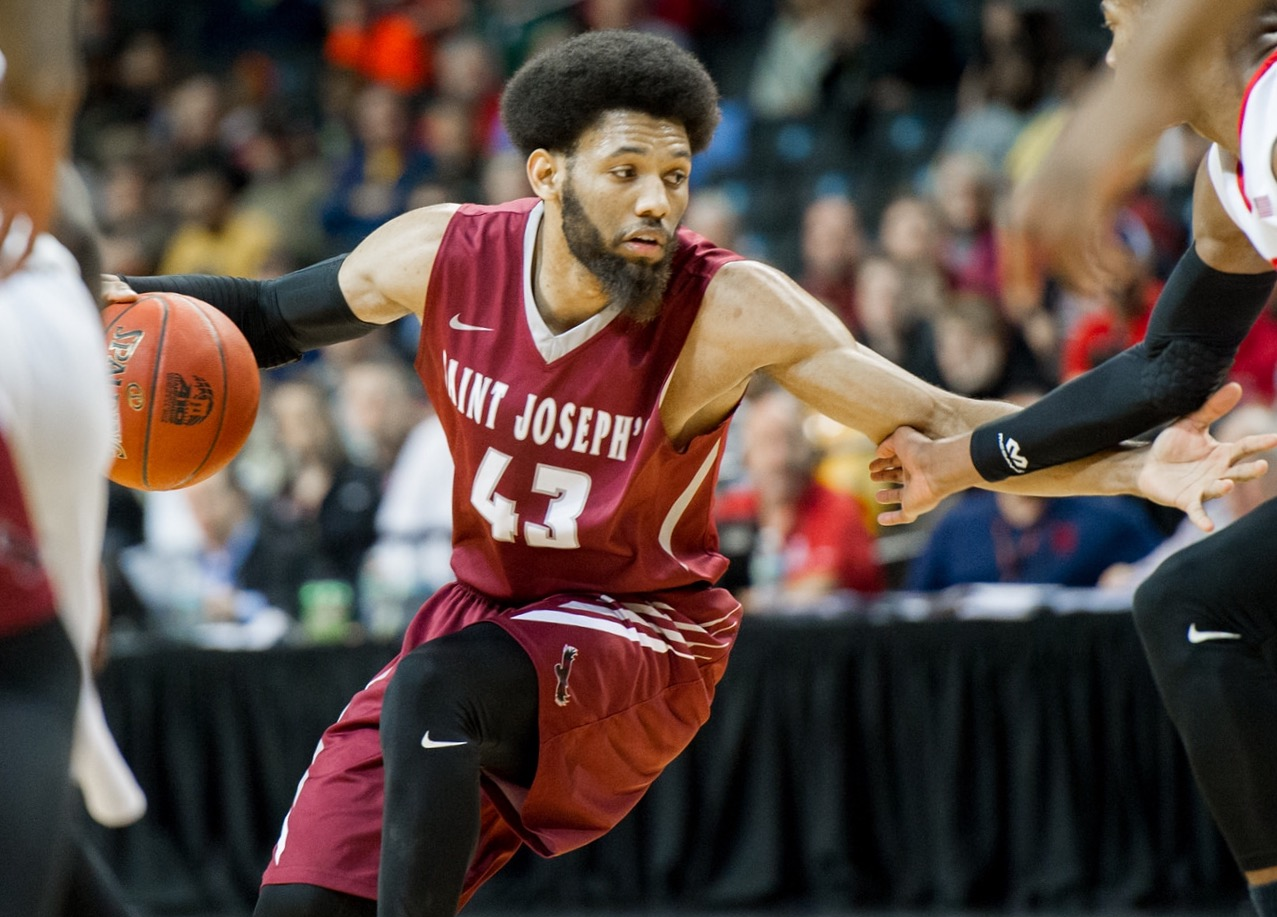
Bembry in the 2016 Atlantic 10 tournament

As a freshman, Bembry won the Atlantic-10 Rookie of the Year award and helped lead the Saint Joseph's Hawks to their first NCAA Tournament berth since 2008 by winning the conference championship. The team also featured future NBA guard Langston Galloway as well as Ronald Roberts and Halil Kanacević.

In Bembry's sophomore season, the Hawks struggled as a result of losing four seniors. However, Bembry was a bright spot as he led the team in scoring (17.7 ppg), rebounds (7.7), assists (3.6), and steals (1.9). He was also named to the A-10's All-Conference First Team.

As a junior, Bembry was again named to the A-10's All-Conference First Team and he won the Atlantic-10 Player of the Year award. He led the Hawks to a second NCAA berth in 3 years after winning the conference championship. In the title game against VCU, Bembry was at his best, scoring 30 points on an extremely efficient 13 for 16 shooting. The Hawks would go on to defeat the Cincinnati Bearcats in the first round before losing a close game to the Oregon Ducks in the Round of 32.

== Professional career ==
=== Atlanta Hawks (2016–2020) ===
On June 23, 2016, Bembry was selected by the Atlanta Hawks with the 21st overall pick in the 2016 NBA draft. On July 15, 2016, he signed his rookie scale contract with the Hawks. He made his NBA debut in the Hawks' 114–99 season-opening win over the Washington Wizards on October 27, 2016, recording two points and one rebound in two minutes off the bench. In February 2017, he twice had a season-high 10 points. During his rookie season, he had multiple assignments with the Salt Lake City Stars of the NBA Development League, pursuant to the flexible assignment rule.

On September 13, 2017, Bembry was ruled out for four-to-six weeks after sustaining a strained right triceps. On January 5, 2018, he suffered a left adductor strain, which ruled him out for the rest of the month.

On October 24, 2018, Bembry grabbed a career-high 16 rebounds in 29 minutes in a 111–104 win over the Dallas Mavericks.

On November 22, 2019, Bembry led the Hawks in scoring with a then season high 22 points, in a 128–103 loss to the Detroit Pistons.

=== Toronto Raptors (2020–2021) ===
On November 29, 2020, Bembry signed a two-year contract with the Toronto Raptors worth $4 million. On January 31, 2021, Bembry scored a season-high 12 points while getting two rebounds and assists in a 115–102 win against the Orlando Magic. On April 8, Bembry was suspended for one game for leaving the bench during an altercation between the Raptors and the Los Angeles Lakers. On August 3, he was waived by the Raptors.

=== Brooklyn Nets (2021–2022) ===
On August 8, 2021, Bembry signed with the Brooklyn Nets. On November 27, Bembry scored a season high 18 points, alongside grabbing 9 rebounds, in a 113–107 loss to the Phoenix Suns. On February 10, 2022, he was waived.

=== Milwaukee Bucks (2022) ===
On February 16, 2022, Bembry signed with the Milwaukee Bucks. On March 12, he suffered a right knee injury during a 109–122 loss to the Golden State Warriors. The next day, he was diagnosed with a torn ACL and MCL in his right knee, meaning he would miss the rest of the season. On April 7, Bembry was waived by the Bucks.

== Personal life ==
Two weeks before the 2016 NBA draft, Bembry's younger brother, Adrian, was shot and killed outside of an apartment building in Charlotte, trying to break up a fight. Bembry wears the jersey number 95 in honor of his brother, who was born in 1995.

He is the nephew of Gary Springer and the cousin of Birmingham Squadron player Jaden Springer who won an NBA Championship as a member of the Boston Celtics in 2024.

In December 2023, Bembry was inducted into the Philadelphia Big 5 Hall of Fame.

== Career statistics ==
Legend
GP	Games played	GS	Games started	MPG	Minutes per game
FG%	Field goal percentage	3P%	3-point field goal percentage	FT%	Free throw percentage
RPG	Rebounds per game	APG	Assists per game	SPG	Steals per game
BPG	Blocks per game	PPG	Points per game	**Bold**	Career high
*	Led the league

=== NBA ===
==== Regular season ====
Year	Team	GP	GS	MPG	FG%	3P%	FT%	RPG	APG	SPG	BPG	PPG
2016–17	Atlanta	38	21	12.8	.480	.056	.375	1.6	.7	.2	.1	2.7
2017–18	Atlanta	26	3	17.5	.414	.367	.576	2.8	1.9	.8	**.5**	5.2
2018–19	Atlanta	**82***	15	**23.5**	.446	.289	.640	**4.4**	**2.5**	**1.3**	**.5**	**8.4**
2019–20	Atlanta	43	4	21.3	.456	.231	.542	3.5	1.9	**1.3**	.4	5.8
2020–21	Toronto	51	12	19.1	.513	.264	**.682**	2.9	2.1	1.0	.4	5.7
2021–22	Brooklyn	48	**20**	19.8	**.568**	**.417**	.600	3.2	1.3	1.0	**.5**	5.8
2021–22	Milwaukee	8	0	9.6	.375	–	–	1.4	.8	.3	.0	.8
Career		296	55	19.2	.474	.283	.611	3.2	1.8	1.0	.4	5.9

=== College ===
Year	Team	GP	GS	MPG	FG%	3P%	FT%	RPG	APG	SPG	BPG	PPG
2013–14	Saint Joseph's	34	34	32.6	.458	**.346**	.583	4.5	2.7	.9	.6	12.1
2014–15	Saint Joseph's	31	31	**38.6**	.432	.327	.638	7.7	3.6	**1.9**	**.9**	**17.7**
2015–16	Saint Joseph's	**36**	**35**	37.3	**.479**	.266	**.657**	**7.8**	**4.5**	1.4	.8	17.5
Career		101	100	36.1	.457	.312	.628	6.7	3.6	1.4	.8	15.7
