= Dewayne Dedmon =

American basketball player (born 1989)

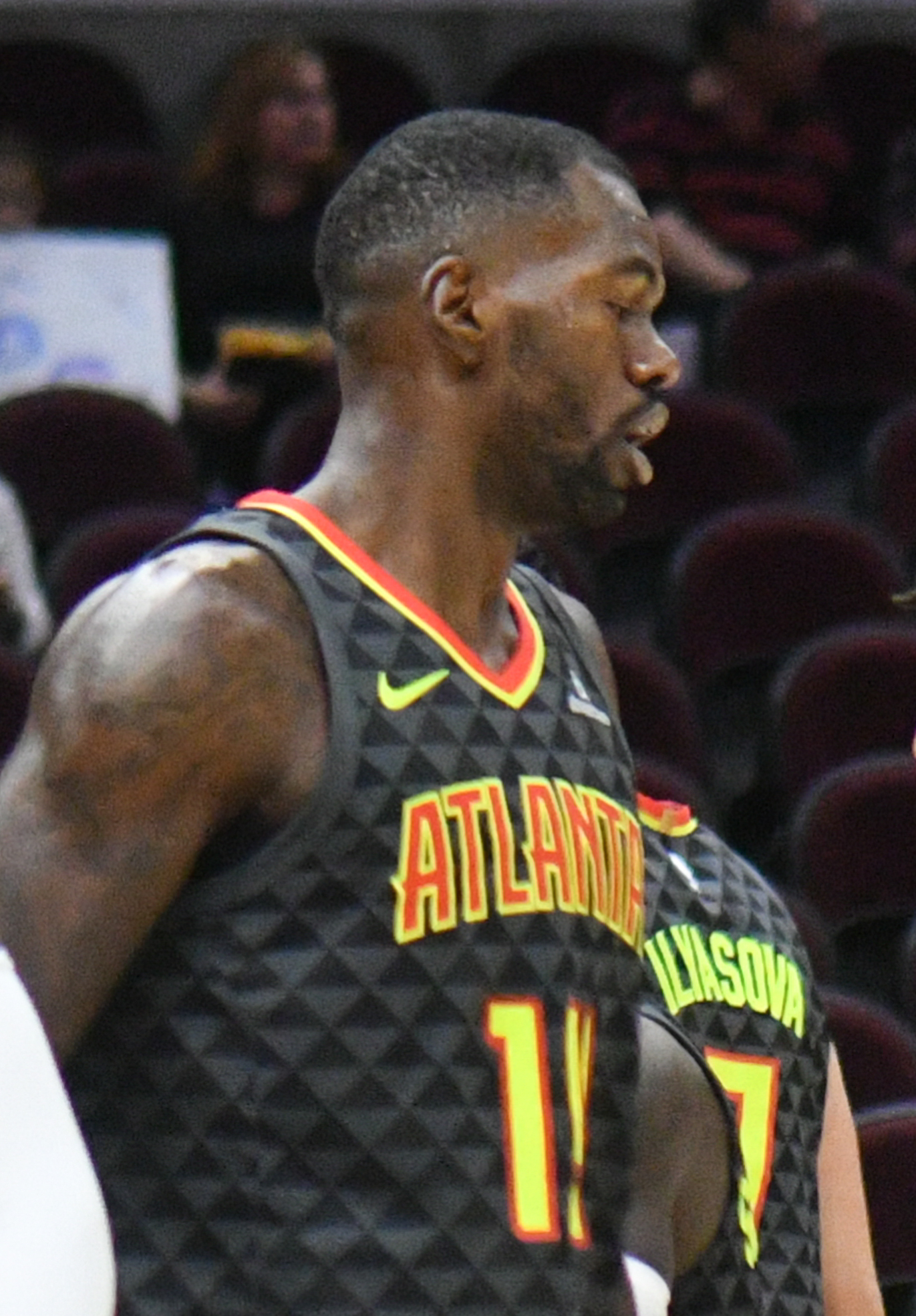
- Dedmon with the Atlanta Hawks in 2017

Personal information
- Born: August 12, 1989 (age 37) Lancaster, California, U.S.
- Listed height: 6 ft 10 in (2.08 m)
- Listed weight: 245 lb (111 kg)

Career information
- High school: Lancaster (Lancaster, California)
- College: Antelope Valley (2009–2010); USC (2011–2013)
- NBA draft: 2013: undrafted
- Playing career: 2013–2024
- Position: Center
- Number: 21, 30, 3, 14, 13, 34

Career history
- 2013: Golden State Warriors
- 2013: →Santa Cruz Warriors
- 2013–2014: Santa Cruz Warriors
- 2014: Philadelphia 76ers
- 2014–2016: Orlando Magic
- 2016: →Erie BayHawks
- 2016–2017: San Antonio Spurs
- 2017–2019: Atlanta Hawks
- 2019–2020: Sacramento Kings
- 2020: Atlanta Hawks
- 2021–2023: Miami Heat
- 2023: Philadelphia 76ers
- 2023–2024: Ontario Clippers

Career highlights
- NBA D-League All-Star (2014)
- Stats at NBA.com
- Stats at Basketball Reference

Dewayne Jamal Dedmon (born August 12, 1989) is an American former professional basketball player, who played for ten seasons in the National Basketball Association (NBA). Nicknamed "the Mechanic", he played college basketball for Antelope Valley College and USC.

== High school and college career ==
=== Lancaster and Antelope Valley ===
Dedmon attended Lancaster High School in Lancaster, California. Although tall and athletic, Dedmon did not play high school basketball until his senior year due to his mother's religious objections. His mother, a devout Jehovah's Witness, refused to allow him to play organized basketball, believing it might affect his religious devotion. After turning 18, Dedmon, who had already grown to 6 ft 8 in (2.03 m), decided to exercise his age of majority rights and begin playing. After graduating from Lancaster in 2008, Dedmon attended Antelope Valley College as a part-time student and did not play basketball during the 2008–09 season.

As a freshman at Antelope Valley in 2009–10, Dedmon, who had grown to 7 ft 0 in (2.13 m) tall, helped the Marauders to a 17–14 record while averaging 6.6 points and 7.8 rebounds per game. He also had 46 blocks and tied the school record with seven blocks against Chaffey College on January 22, 2010. Five days later against Victor Valley, he sustained a broken bone in his forehead and an injured nasal cavity when he was hit by an errant elbow. The injury forced Dedmon to miss the final seven regular season games, but he returned for the playoffs where he recorded 5 points and 13 rebounds in his first game back, a win against Miramar College on February 24.

=== USC ===
On April 14, 2010, Dedmon signed with the University of Southern California and subsequently redshirted the 2010–11 due to NCAA transfer regulations. He completed one final semester at Antelope Valley but did not play for Marauders in order to keep three full seasons of eligibility. He began practicing with USC in the second semester of 2010–11 when he transferred from Antelope Valley.

As a redshirted sophomore for USC in 2011–12, Dedmon battled with numerous injuries which curtailed his development but still managed to average 7.6 points and 5.5 rebounds in 20 games (all starts). He led the team with a .551 shooting percentage and made 50 percent or more of his shots in 14 of his 20 starts. He had a season-high 18 points against Oregon on January 19, 2012, and followed that up with eight points and eight rebounds against Oregon State on January 21. Five days later against Colorado, he suffered a season-ending injury with a torn left MCL.

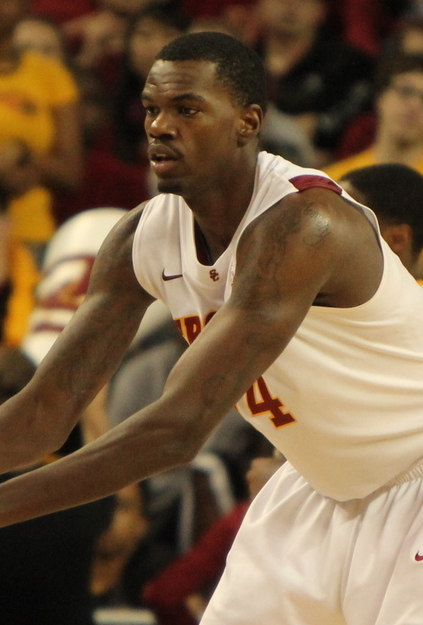
Dedmon with USC in 2012

As a junior for USC in 2012–13, Dedmon led the Trojans with 7.0 rebounds to go with 6.7 points in 31 games (29 starts). After struggling to score in the early part of the season, Dedmon had the best stretch of his career toward the beginning of USC's conference slate, averaging 10.8 points, 8.4 rebounds and three blocks per game in a five-game stretch. He tied his career-high of 18 points against Washington on March 6 but was suspended indefinitely on March 12 following a reported Saturday night incident in downtown Spokane between USC players and local bar patrons. USC lost 69–66 to Utah in the opening round of the Pac-12 tournament, two days after the suspensions were announced, with Dedmon and also-suspended senior center James Blasczyk not making the trip to the tournament. The Trojans finished the season with a 14–18 record. Dedmon also averaged 2.1 blocks per game in 2012–13, good for second in the Pac-12 and the sixth-best single season total in USC history, and finished the season ninth in program history with 85 career blocks.

On April 24, 2013, Dedmon declared for the NBA draft, forgoing his final year of college eligibility.

== Professional career ==
=== Golden State Warriors (2013) ===
After going undrafted in the 2013 NBA draft, Dedmon joined the Miami Heat for the Orlando Summer League and the Dallas Mavericks for the Las Vegas Summer League. On September 23, 2013, he signed with the Golden State Warriors. However, he was later waived by Golden State on October 25 after appearing in five preseason games. On November 1, he was acquired by the Santa Cruz Warriors of the NBA Development League as an affiliate player of Golden State.

On November 18, 2013, Dedmon re-signed with the Golden State Warriors, but was assigned back down to Santa Cruz the next day. He was recalled by Golden State on November 20, reassigned on November 24, and recalled again on November 25. On December 5, he was waived by Golden State after appearing in four games for the team. Five days later, he was reacquired by Santa Cruz.

=== Philadelphia 76ers (2014) ===
On January 14, 2014, Dedmon signed a 10-day contract with the Philadelphia 76ers. The next day, he made his debut for the 76ers. In 14 minutes of action, he recorded 7 rebounds and 2 blocks in a 95–92 win over the Charlotte Bobcats. On January 24, he signed a second 10-day contract with the 76ers. After his second 10-day contract expired on February 2, the 76ers parted ways with Dedmon on February 3 after they elected to not sign him for the rest of the season. That same day, he was named to the Futures All-Star roster for the 2014 NBA D-League All-Star Game. The following day, he was reacquired and deactivated by Santa Cruz.

=== Orlando Magic (2014–2016) ===
On February 25, 2014, Dedmon signed a 10-day contract with the Orlando Magic. He went on to sign a second 10-day contract with the Magic on March 7, and then a multi-year deal on March 17.

In July 2014, Dedmon joined the Magic for the 2014 NBA Summer League. He spent his first full NBA season with the Magic in 2014–15. On March 8, 2015, he had a season-best game with 11 points and 16 rebounds in 103–98 win over the Boston Celtics.

On November 7, 2015, Dedmon scored a then career-high 12 points in a 105–97 win over the Philadelphia 76ers. On March 5, 2016, he was assigned to the Erie BayHawks, the Magic's D-League affiliate. Two days later, he was recalled by the Magic. On March 26, 2016, he recorded a career-high 18 points and a season-high 13 rebounds in 22 minutes as a starter in a 111–89 win over the Chicago Bulls.

=== San Antonio Spurs (2016–2017) ===
On July 14, 2016, Dedmon signed with the San Antonio Spurs. He made his debut for the Spurs on October 25, 2016, recording two points, eight rebounds, one steal and two blocks in 16 minutes off the bench in a 129–100 win over the Golden State Warriors. On February 10, 2017, Dedmon had 17 points and 17 rebounds, setting season highs in both categories, to help the Spurs to a 103–92 victory over the Detroit Pistons. He set a career high in rebounds and finished one point shy of his career high in scoring.

=== Atlanta Hawks (2017–2019) ===
On July 21, 2017, Dedmon signed with the Atlanta Hawks. On November 15, 2017, he scored a career-high 20 points and had 14 rebounds in a 126–80 win over the Sacramento Kings. On November 29, 2017, he was ruled out for three-to-six weeks due to a left tibia stress reaction. He returned to action on January 8 against the Los Angeles Clippers on a minutes restriction after missing 19 games. On February 11, 2018, Dedmon matched his career high with 20 points and had 13 rebounds in a 118–115 win over the Detroit Pistons. On March 20, 2018, he had 15 points and 15 rebounds in a 99–94 win over the Utah Jazz.

On December 16, 2018, Dedmon had 24 points and 12 rebounds in a 144–127 loss to the Brooklyn Nets. On December 26, he had 18 points and a season-best 15 rebounds in a 129–121 loss to the Indiana Pacers. On January 21, 2019, he scored 24 points and made five of seven 3-pointers in a 122–103 loss to the Orlando Magic. On March 31, he was ruled out for the rest of the season with a left ankle injury.

=== Sacramento Kings (2019–2020) ===
On July 8, 2019, the Sacramento Kings signed Dedmon to a three-year, $40 million contract.

Dedmon experienced diminished playing time as Richaun Holmes and Harry Giles moved ahead of him in the rotation. On January 2, 2020, the NBA fined Dedmon $50,000 for publicly requesting a trade.

=== Return to Atlanta (2020) ===
On February 6, 2020, Dedmon was traded back to Atlanta along with two second round picks, in exchange for Jabari Parker and Alex Len. He had a season-high 5 blocks in both his last game before the trade and the first game after, both wins for his team.

On November 20, 2020, Dedmon was traded to the Detroit Pistons in exchange for Tony Snell and Khyri Thomas, but was waived four days later.

=== Miami Heat (2021–2023) ===
On April 8, 2021, Dedmon signed with the Miami Heat. Dedmon re-signed with the Heat on August 6, 2021, on a one-year veteran's minimum contract.

On July 6, 2022, Dedmon re-signed with the Heat on a two-year, $9 million contract. On January 11, 2023, the Heat suspended Dedmon for one game without pay due to an incident during a game with the Oklahoma City Thunder a day earlier. Dedmon had gotten into an argument with Heat head coach Erik Spoelstra and threw a massage gun onto the court, resulting in him being ejected from the game.

On February 7, 2023, Dedmon was traded, alongside a 2028 second-round pick, to the San Antonio Spurs in exchange for cash considerations. On February 9, he was waived by the Spurs.

=== Return to Philadelphia (2023) ===
On February 14, 2023, Dedmon signed with the Philadelphia 76ers.

=== Ontario Clippers (2023–2024) ===
On November 17, 2023, Dedmon signed with the Ontario Clippers of the NBA G League.

In the Tip-Off Tournament, Dedmon averaged 5.4 points and 4.6 rebounds in 13 minutes per game. For the regular season, he would play in 14 of the team's first 20 games and averaged 7.4 points and 6.6 rebounds in 16.6 minutes (winning 8 of the 14 games he played in). However, on February 21, 2024, he was waived by the Clippers.

== Career statistics ==
Legend
GP	Games played	GS	Games started	MPG	Minutes per game
FG%	Field goal percentage	3P%	3-point field goal percentage	FT%	Free throw percentage
RPG	Rebounds per game	APG	Assists per game	SPG	Steals per game
BPG	Blocks per game	PPG	Points per game	**Bold**	Career high

=== NBA ===
==== Regular season ====
Year	Team	GP	GS	MPG	FG%	3P%	FT%	RPG	APG	SPG	BPG	PPG
2013–14	Golden State	4	0	1.4	.000	—	.500	.0	.0	.0	.0	.3
2013–14	Philadelphia	11	0	13.6	.517	—	.538	4.5	.3	.0	.8	3.4
2013–14	Orlando	16	6	14.6	.434	—	.765	4.9	.1	.4	.8	3.7
2014–15	Orlando	59	15	14.3	.562	.000	.531	5.0	.2	.3	.8	3.7
2015–16	Orlando	58	20	12.2	.559	—	.750	3.9	.2	.4	.8	4.4
2016–17	San Antonio	**76**	37	17.5	.622	—	.699	6.5	.6	.5	.8	5.1
2017–18	Atlanta	62	46	24.9	.524	.355	.779	7.9	**1.5**	.6	.8	10.0
2018–19	Atlanta	64	**52**	**25.1**	.492	.382	.814	7.5	1.4	**1.1**	1.1	**10.8**
2019–20	Sacramento	34	10	15.9	.404	.197	.821	4.9	.4	.4	.8	5.1
2019–20	Atlanta	10	8	23.3	.393	.222	**.875**	**8.2**	.7	1.0	**1.5**	8.1
2020–21	Miami	16	0	13.1	**.708**	.200	.741	5.4	.8	.6	.4	7.1
2021–22	Miami	67	15	15.9	.566	.404	.750	5.8	.7	.4	.6	6.3
2022–23	Miami	30	0	11.7	.496	.297	.727	3.6	.5	.2	.5	5.7
2022–23	Philadelphia	8	1	9.5	.591	**.500**	.200	3.1	1.3	.3	.6	3.5
Career		515	210	17.3	.526	.336	.731	5.8	.7	.5	.8	6.3

==== Playoffs ====
Year	Team	GP	GS	MPG	FG%	3P%	FT%	RPG	APG	SPG	BPG	PPG
2017	San Antonio	12	**3**	8.1	**.609**	–	.531	3.9	.3	**.2**	.3	3.8
2021	Miami	4	0	**14.3**	.556	**.333**	.800	**4.5**	**.8**	.0	**.5**	**6.3**
2022	Miami	**14**	0	9.9	.467	.100	**.833**	3.0	.4	.1	.2	3.8
2023	Philadelphia	1	0	5.0	.000	.000	–	1.0	.0	.0	.0	.0
Career		31	3	9.6	.517	.143	.633	3.5	.4	.1	.3	4.0

=== College ===
Year	Team	GP	GS	MPG	FG%	3P%	FT%	RPG	APG	SPG	BPG	PPG
2011–12	USC	20	20	**23.3**	**.551**	.000	.537	5.5	.3	.7	1.0	**7.6**
2012–13	USC	**31**	**29**	22.3	.500	.000	**.681**	**7.0**	**.6**	**1.1**	**2.1**	6.7
Career		51	49	22.7	.520	.000	.614	6.4	.5	.9	1.7	7.1

== Personal life ==
Dedmon is the son of Thomas Dedmon and Gail Lewis, and has two older sisters, Sabrina and Marina. His father died by suicide when Dedmon was just three years old, while his mother is a devout Jehovah's Witness.

Dedmon married Kayla Dedmon on August 21, 2019. The couple has two children.
