= Marlon Garnett =

American basketball player (born 1975)

Windy City Bulls
- Title: Assistant coach
- League: NBA G League

Personal information
- Born: July 3, 1975 (age 51) Los Angeles, California, U.S.
- Listed height: 6 ft 2 in (1.88 m)
- Listed weight: 189 lb (86 kg)

Career information
- High school: Hamilton (Los Angeles, California)
- College: Santa Clara (1993–1997)
- NBA draft: 1997: undrafted
- Playing career: 1999–2013
- Position: Shooting guard
- Number: 20
- Coaching career: 2015–present

Career history

Playing
- 1999: Boston Celtics
- 1999–2000: Grand Rapids Hoops
- 2000: Fort Wayne Fury
- 2000–2002: Estudiantes
- 2002–2003: Olimpia Milano
- 2003–2004: Sicilia Messina
- 2004–2005: Benetton Treviso
- 2005–2006: Whirlpool Varese
- 2006–2007: Estudiantes
- 2007–2008: Split
- 2008: Zadar
- 2009: Cedevita
- 2009–2010: Zob Ahan Isfahan
- 2010–2011: Mahram Tehran
- 2012: Atléticos de San Germán
- 2013: Inter Bratislava

Coaching
- 2015–2016: San Antonio Spurs (assistant)
- 2016–2018: Phoenix Suns (assistant)
- 2018–2021: Atlanta Hawks (assistant)
- 2021–2024: Charlotte Hornets (assistant)
- 2026–present: Windy City Bulls (assistant)

Career highlights
- As player: Slovakian League champion (2013); Iranian League champion (2011); Croatian League champion (2008); Italian Cup champion (2005); WCC Player of the Year (1997); 2× First-team All-WCC (1995, 1997)
- Stats at NBA.com
- Stats at Basketball Reference

Marlon Errol Garnett (born July 3, 1975) is an American-Belizean coach and former professional basketball player. He is currently an assistant coach for the Windy City Bulls of the NBA G League.

== Career ==
Nicknamed "Money G", Garnett played collegiately for the Broncos of Santa Clara University, winning West Coast Conference player of the year honors in 1997.

Garnett entered the National Basketball Association in February 1999, signing with the Boston Celtics as an undrafted free agent. Garnett appeared in 24 games, totaling 51 points, 21 rebounds, and 18 assists. He later played professionally in Europe (Spain, Italy and Croatia), including a stint with Benetton Treviso in which he won the Italian Cup in 2005.

During the 2015–16 NBA season, Garnett would work with the San Antonio Spurs as both a video coordinator and a player development coordinator. On July 27, 2016, Garnett would make his official move into the coaching world for the NBA by being both an assistant head coach and a player development coach for the Phoenix Suns. While he was interested in staying with San Antonio and helping them transition right after Tim Duncan's retirement from the league, Garnett ultimately decided to help out the Suns in order to properly build the team up and assist them moving forward. During his second season with the Suns, Garnett became the head coach for the 2017 NBA Summer League. Garnett would later be promoted to a full-time assistant coach for the Suns on October 23, 2017.

On June 8, 2018, Garnett was hired by the Atlanta Hawks as an assistant coach.

On September 27, 2021, Garnett was hired by the Charlotte Hornets as an assistant coach. Garnett was the summer league coach for the Hornets in 2023.

== See also ==
- List of foreign NBA coaches
- List of foreign NBA players
