= 2016–17 Oklahoma City Thunder season =

NBA professional basketball team season

- Head coach: Billy Donovan
- General manager: Sam Presti
- Owners: Professional Basketball Club LLC
- Arena: Chesapeake Energy Arena

Results
- Record: 47–35 (.573)
- Place: Division: 2nd (Northwest); Conference: 6th (Western)
- Playoff finish: First Round (lost to Rockets 1–4)
- Stats at Basketball Reference

Local media
- Television: Fox Sports Oklahoma
- Radio: KWPN; WWLS-FM

The 2016–17 Oklahoma City Thunder season was the 9th season of the franchise in Oklahoma City and the 51st in the National Basketball Association (NBA). On April 9th, Russell Westbrook broke Oscar Robertson's record for most triple-doubles in a season with 42. Westbrook would go on to be named the League's MVP in June.

The Thunder would finish the regular season with a 47–35 record, securing the 6th seed. In the playoffs, they faced off against the Houston Rockets in the First Round, in which they lost in five games.

This was the Thunder's first season since 2007–08 without Kevin Durant, as he left the Thunder and signed with the Golden State Warriors.

== Previous season ==
The Thunder finished the 2015–16 season 55–27 to finish in first place in the Northwest Division, third in the Western Conference and qualified for the playoffs. Last season featured the Thunder making their fourth conference finals appearance since relocating to Oklahoma City before falling to the Golden State Warriors after leading the series 3–1.

== Offseason ==
=== Draft picks ===
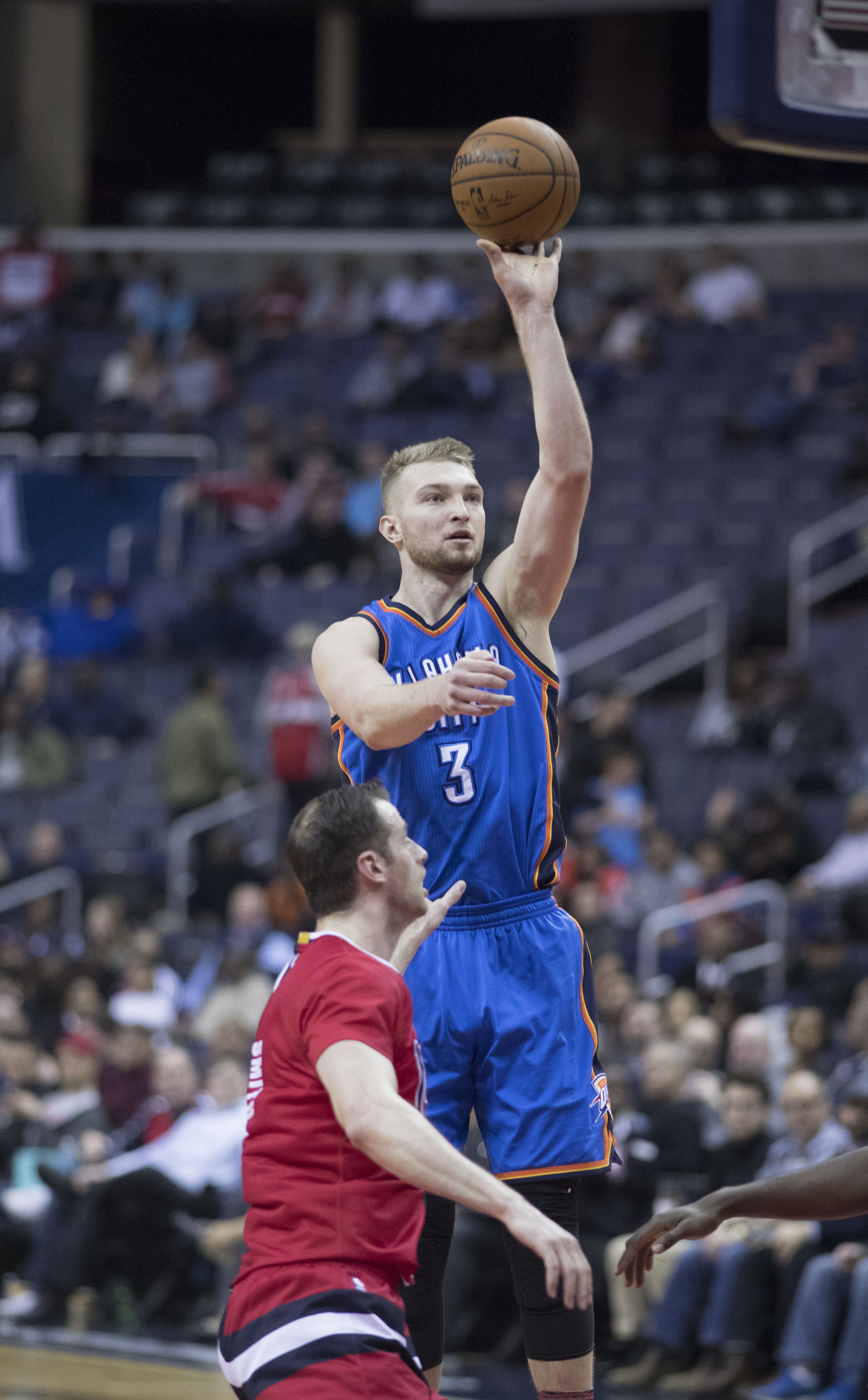
Domantas Sabonis was traded to the Oklahoma City Thunder.

Round	Pick	Player	Position	Nationality	College
Domantas Sabonis and Daniel Hamilton were later traded to the Thunder

The Thunder did not own their first-round pick or second-round pick entering the draft. The Thunder had their 2016 first-round pick conveyed to the Philadelphia 76ers after being originally acquired by the Cleveland Cavaliers in the Dion Waiters trade back in 2015. The Thunder had their 2015 first-round pick protected top 18 however did not convey as the Thunder ended up with the 14th pick. The protections became protected top 15 which rolled over to the Thunder's 2016 first-round pick, ending up as 26th overall. The Thunder also traded their 2016 second-round pick in the Randy Foye trade with the Denver Nuggets in 2016.

On draft night, the Thunder traded Serge Ibaka to the Orlando Magic in exchange for Victor Oladipo, Ersan Ilyasova and the draft rights to Domantas Sabonis, the eleventh pick. The Thunder also traded for the draft rights to Daniel Hamilton, the fifty-sixth pick, from the Denver Nuggets in exchange for cash considerations.

The Thunder ended 2016 NBA draft night with Gonzaga forward Domantas Sabonis, UConn guard Daniel Hamilton as well as Victor Oladipo and Ersan Ilyasova.

=== Trades ===
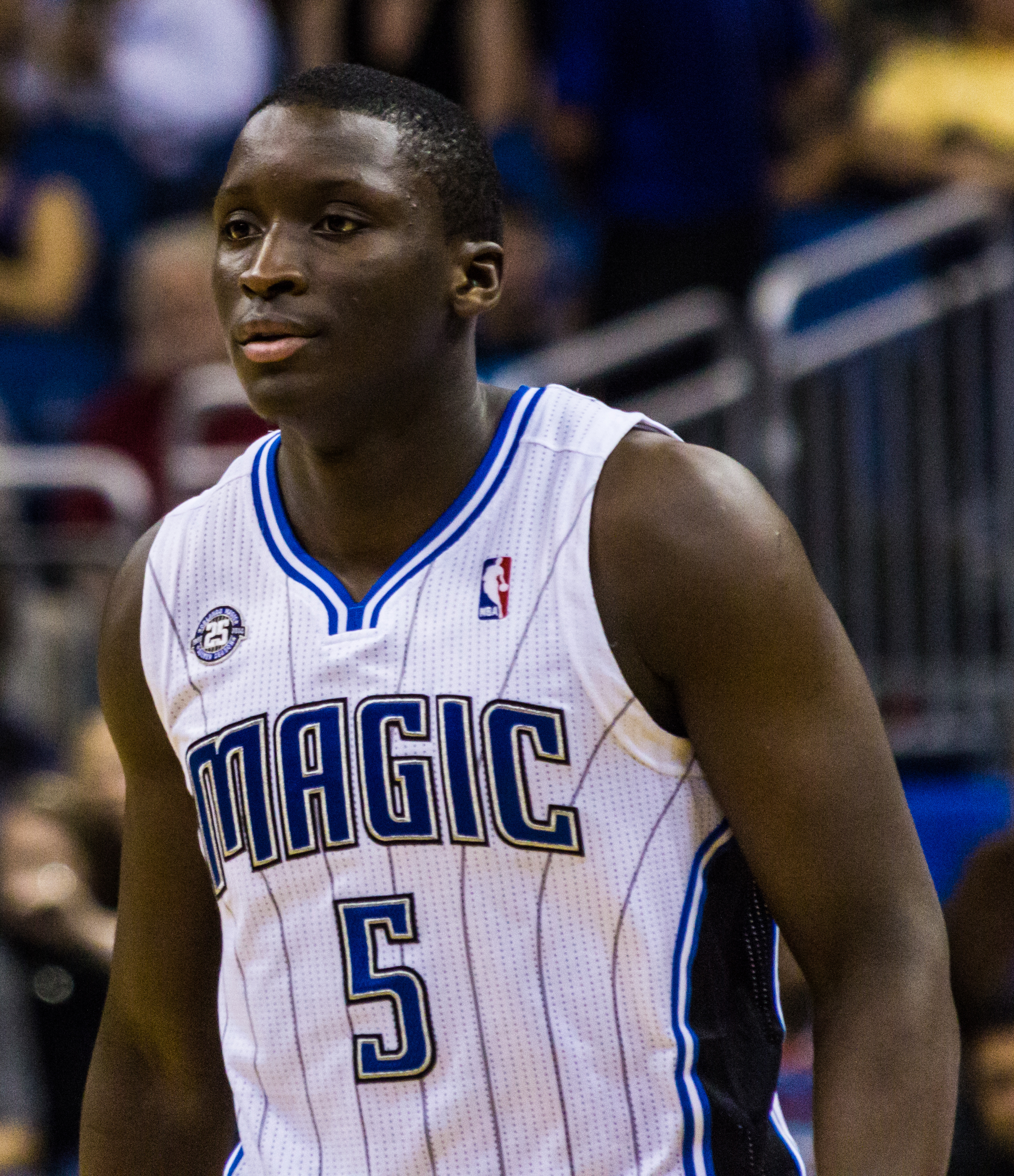
Victor Oladipo was traded to the Thunder.

On June 23, the Thunder traded Serge Ibaka to the Orlando Magic in exchange for Victor Oladipo, Ersan Ilyasova, and the draft rights to Domantas Sabonis, the eleventh pick. Ibaka was set to hit unrestricted free agency following the 2016-17 season and was becoming unsatisfied with his role on the team, particularly his touches on offense. With the growing sentiment that Ibaka would look for another team in free agency as well as Kevin Durant's upcoming free agency, the Thunder decided to gamble to strengthen their position to keep Durant.

Tonight represented an opportunity to build the versatility, depth and skill of our basketball team. Victor, Ersan and Domantas represent the character, work ethic and toughness that we relentlessly pursue with the Thunder. Through the continued emergence and development of our core, we were able to capitalize on the opportunity to acquire three highly skilled professionals. I want to acknowledge Serge for his contributions to the ongoing legacy of the Thunder. He has been integral to our success and growth, has been a great community member and we wish him only the best.

— Sam Presti

Oladipo came to the Thunder as the second overall pick of the 2013 NBA draft with career averages of 15.9 points, 4.4 rebounds, 4.0 assists and 1.6 steals during his three-year stint with the Orlando Magic that saw an All-Rookie First Team selection in 2014. The same day, the Thunder traded cash considerations to the Denver Nuggets in exchange for Daniel Hamilton, the fifty-sixth pick.

On August 30, the Thunder traded two 2017 second-round picks to the Denver Nuggets in exchange for Joffrey Lauvergne.

=== Free agency ===
For this offseason, free agency began on July 1, 2016, while the July moratorium ended on July 6. Kevin Durant, Randy Foye, Nazr Mohammed and Dion Waiters were set to hit unrestricted free agency. On July 4, it was reported that Kevin Durant agreed to a two-year, $54.3 million deal with the Golden State Warriors, which he later signed on July 7. Prior to his decision, Durant met with the Oklahoma City Thunder, Golden State Warriors, San Antonio Spurs, Boston Celtics, Miami Heat and the Los Angeles Clippers. Durant announced his decision to leave the Thunder on The Players' Tribune citing "by far the most challenging few weeks in my professional life." Durant spent all nine seasons with the Thunder organization, one year in Seattle. Durant joined the Warriors as a seven-time All Star, All-NBA First Team honors five times, All-NBA Second Team honors once and named the NBA Most Valuable Player award in 2014. Coming off an injury-riddled 2014-15 season, Durant's final act with the Thunder came off a 55–27 record, defeating the 67-win San Antonio Spurs and nearly defeating the record setting 73-9 Golden State Warriors after leading 3–1 to lose in seven games.

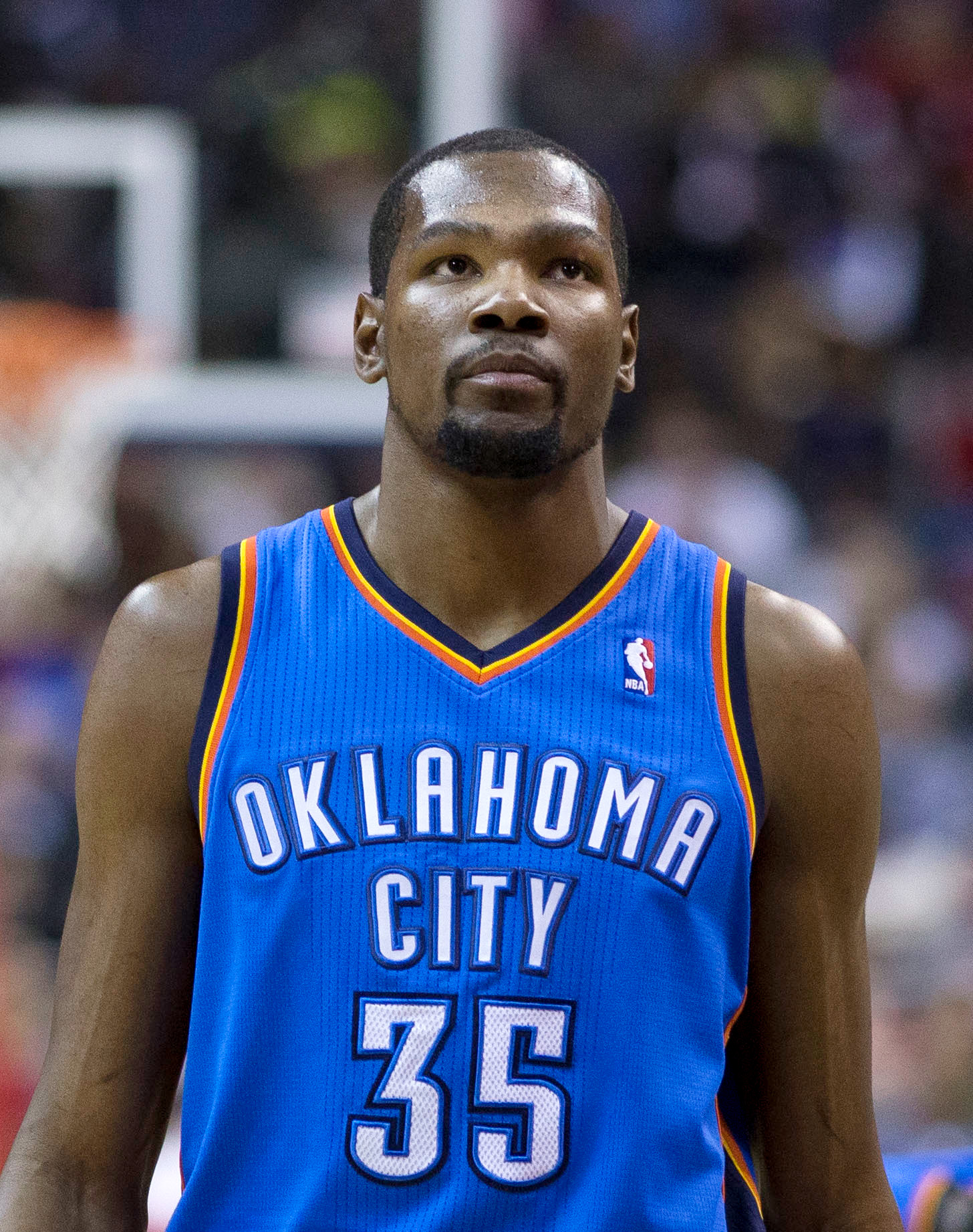
Kevin Durant signed with the Golden State Warriors after nine seasons with the Thunder.

After Durant announced his intentions to sign with the Warriors, Thunder owner Clay Bennett and Thunder general manager Sam Presti released statements commemorating Durant.

Kevin's contributions to our organization during his nine years were profound, on and off the court. He helped the Thunder grow and succeed in immeasurable ways and impacted the community just the same. We thank him for his leadership, his play, and how he represented Oklahoma City and the entire state of Oklahoma.

— Clay Bennett

Kevin made an indelible mark on the Thunder organization and the state of Oklahoma as a founding father of this franchise. We can't adequately articulate what he meant to the foundation of this franchise and our success. While clearly disappointing that he has chosen to move on, the core values that he helped establish only lead to us thanking him for the many tangible and intangible ways that he helped our program.

— Sam Presti

Durant's move to the Warriors was received negatively who viewed his exit as "the easy way out" to winning a championship. The decision was commonly compared to LeBron James joining the Miami Heat back in 2010.

On July 15, Randy Foye signed a deal with the Brooklyn Nets. On July 26, Dion Waiters signed a deal with the Miami Heat after he became an unrestricted free agent. After the signing of Alex Abrines, the Thunder rescinded Waiters' qualifying offer in order to prioritize flexibility.

On July 23, Alex Abrines signed a rookie deal with the Thunder. Abrines was originally selected 32nd overall in the 2013 NBA draft but did not sign a contract in the 2013-14 season, instead playing three seasons with FC Barcelona. On August 11, it was reported that Ronnie Price agreed to a two-year, $5 million deal with the Thunder, which he later signed on August 14. On August 20, Semaj Christon signed a rookie deal with the Thunder. Christon was originally selected 55th overall in the 2014 NBA draft but did not sign a contract in the 2014-15 season, instead playing two seasons with the Oklahoma City Blue. With the emergence of Christon, the Thunder decided to waive Price's guaranteed contract along with Mitch McGary to finalize the regular season roster. McGary was suspended for a total of 15 games to start the season due to a drug violation. Originally picked 21st overall in the 2014 NBA draft, McGary suffered an injury-riddled second season with the Thunder after a promising rookie year.

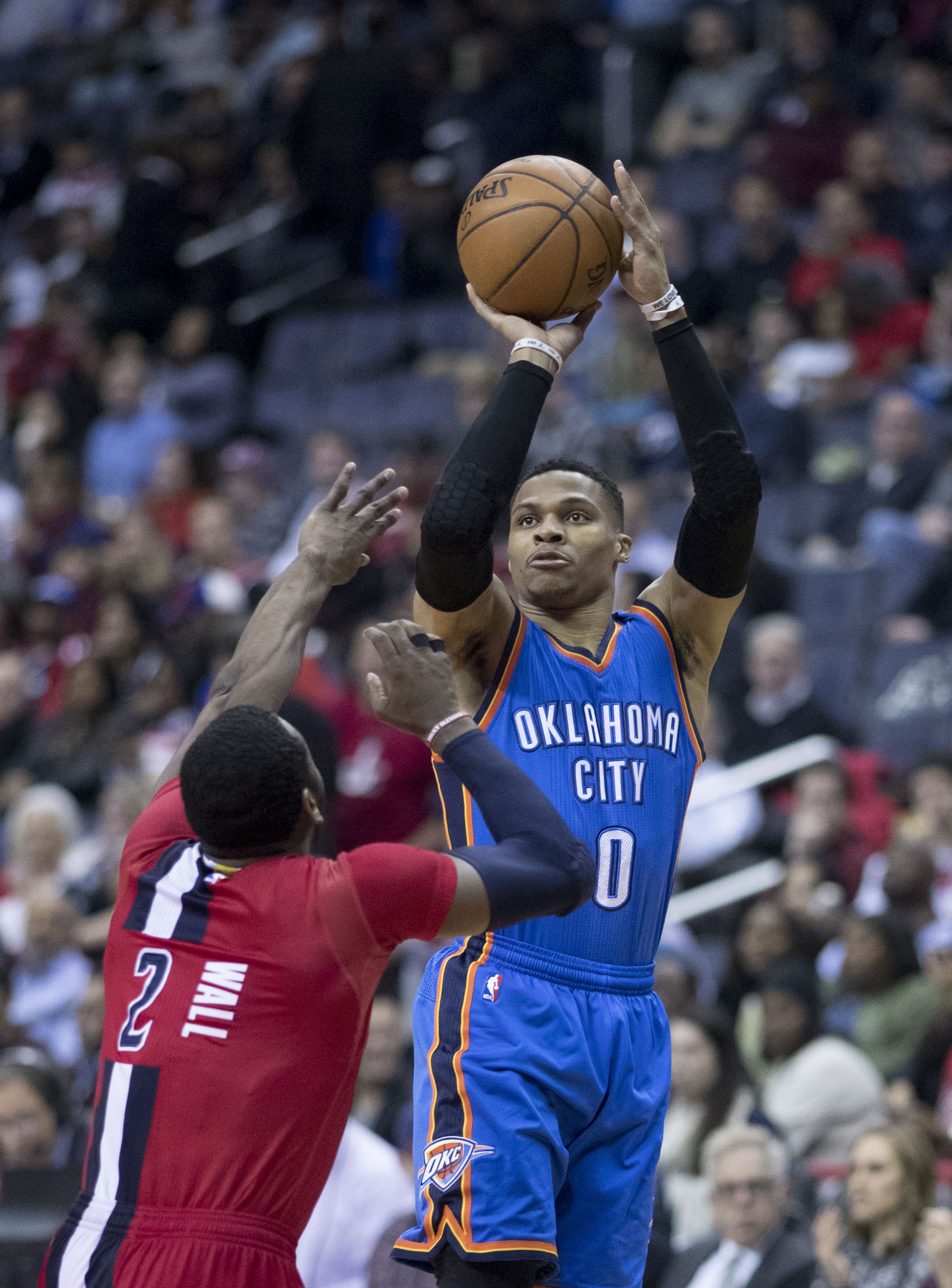
Russell Westbrook was extended to a renegotiated contract.

After Durant's departure, Westbrook's future with the Thunder was speculated with trade rumors. However, on August 4, Russell Westbrook agreed to a renegotiation-and-extension of his contract worth $85.7 million.

I am grateful to extend my contract with the Thunder and continue to play with the only organization that I have played for and have loved being a part of since I was drafted into the NBA. I'm really excited about moving forward with this group of guys and continuing to play in front of the best fans in the world.

— Russell Westbrook

On October 31, the Thunder re-signed Steven Adams and Victor Oladipo to multi-year contract extensions. Playing on their last year of their rookie contracts, both Adams and Oladipo were selected in the 2013 NBA draft. Andre Roberson, who was also in the draft, did not reach a deal with the Thunder. Oladipo agreed to a four-year, $84 million deal while Adams agreed to a four-year, $100 million deal.

=== Front office and coaching changes ===
On June 1, Billy Donovan announced associate head coach Monty Williams would not return to the Thunder for the 2016-17 season. Williams did not return to the Thunder during the 2015-16 season following the death of his wife, Ingrid.

On July 1, the Thunder announced Adrian Griffin, Vin Bhavnani and Royal Ivey as assistant coaches. Griffin joins the Thunder after serving as an assistant coach with the Orlando Magic. Bhavnani joins the coaching staff after serving as the manager of advanced scouting/player development for the Thunder. Ivey joins the coaching staff after serving as a player development assistant for the Thunder.

== Roster ==
2016–17 Oklahoma City Thunder roster
Players

Pos.	No.	Player	Height	Weight	DOB	From
SG	8	Álex Abrines	6 ft 6 in (1.98 m)	200 lb (91 kg)	1993-08-01	Spain
C	12	Steven Adams	6 ft 11 in (2.11 m)	265 lb (120 kg)	1993-07-20	Pittsburgh
PG	6	Semaj Christon	6 ft 3 in (1.91 m)	190 lb (86 kg)	1992-11-01	Xavier
PG	30	Norris Cole	6 ft 2 in (1.88 m)	175 lb (79 kg)	1988-10-13	Cleveland State
PF	4	Nick Collison	6 ft 10 in (2.08 m)	255 lb (116 kg)	1980-10-26	Kansas
PF	22	Taj Gibson	6 ft 9 in (2.06 m)	236 lb (107 kg)	1985-06-24	USC
SF	9	Jerami Grant	6 ft 8 in (2.03 m)	220 lb (100 kg)	1994-03-12	Syracuse
SF	34	Josh Huestis	6 ft 7 in (2.01 m)	230 lb (104 kg)	1991-12-19	Stanford
PF/C	11	Enes Kanter	6 ft 11 in (2.11 m)	260 lb (118 kg)	1992-05-20	Turkey
SF	25	Doug McDermott	6 ft 8 in (2.03 m)	225 lb (102 kg)	1992-01-03	Creighton
SG	5	Victor Oladipo	6 ft 4 in (1.93 m)	210 lb (95 kg)	1992-05-04	Indiana
SF	21	André Roberson	6 ft 7 in (2.01 m)	210 lb (95 kg)	1991-12-04	Colorado
PF	3	Domantas Sabonis	6 ft 11 in (2.11 m)	240 lb (109 kg)	1996-05-03	Gonzaga
SF	15	Kyle Singler	6 ft 8 in (2.03 m)	228 lb (103 kg)	1988-05-04	Duke
PG	0	Russell Westbrook	6 ft 3 in (1.91 m)	200 lb (91 kg)	1988-11-12	UCLA

Coaches
Head coach
- Billy Donovan
Assistant(s)
- Vin Bhavnani
- Mark Bryant
- Maurice Cheeks
- Anthony Grant
- Adrian Griffin
- Royal Ivey
- Darko Rajaković

Legend
- (DP) Unsigned draft pick
- (FA) Free agent
- (S) Suspended
- (DL) On assignment to D-League affiliate
- Injured

Roster
Updated: April 20, 2017

=== Roster notes ===
- Kyle Singler changed his jersey number to #15 while Victor Oladipo chose Singler's former jersey number #5.

== Standings ==
=== Conference ===
Western Conference
#	Team	W	L	PCT	GB	GP
1	z – Golden State Warriors *	67	15	.817	–	82
2	y – San Antonio Spurs *	61	21	.744	6.0	82
3	x – Houston Rockets	55	27	.671	12.0	82
4	x – Los Angeles Clippers	51	31	.622	16.0	82
5	y – Utah Jazz *	51	31	.622	16.0	82
6	x – Oklahoma City Thunder	47	35	.573	20.0	82
7	x – Memphis Grizzlies	43	39	.524	24.0	82
8	x – Portland Trail Blazers	41	41	.500	26.0	82
9	e – Denver Nuggets	40	42	.488	27.0	82
10	e – New Orleans Pelicans	34	48	.415	33.0	82
11	e – Dallas Mavericks	33	49	.402	34.0	82
12	e – Sacramento Kings	32	50	.390	35.0	82
13	e – Minnesota Timberwolves	31	51	.378	36.0	82
14	e – Los Angeles Lakers	26	56	.317	41.0	82
15	e – Phoenix Suns	24	58	.293	43.0	82

=== Division ===
Northwest Division	W	L	PCT	GB	Home	Road	Div	GP
y – Utah Jazz	51	31	.622	–	29‍–‍12	22‍–‍19	8–8	82
x – Oklahoma City Thunder	47	35	.573	4.0	28‍–‍13	19‍–‍22	10–6	82
x – Portland Trail Blazers	41	41	.500	10.0	25‍–‍16	16‍–‍25	11–5	82
e – Denver Nuggets	40	42	.488	11.0	22‍–‍19	18‍–‍23	6–10	82
e – Minnesota Timberwolves	31	51	.378	20.0	20‍–‍21	11‍–‍30	5–11	82

== Game log ==
=== Preseason ===
2016 pre-season game log
Total: 3–3 (home: 2–1; road: 1–2)
Preseason: 3–3 (home: 2–1; road: 1–2)

Game	Date	Team	Score	High points	High rebounds	High assists	Location Attendance	Record
1	October 3	@ Real Madrid	L 137–142 (OT)	Victor Oladipo (34)	Enes Kanter (10)	Victor Oladipo (5)	Barclaycard Center (Madrid); 12,414	0–1
2	October 5	@ FC Barcelona	W 92–89	Enes Kanter (24)	Enes Kanter (8)	Russell Westbrook (5)	Palau Sant Jordi (Barcelona); 16,236	1–1
3	October 11	@ Dallas	L 109–114	Ersan İlyasova (19)	Enes Kanter (13)	Russell Westbrook (7)	American Airlines Center; 18,239	1–2
4	October 13	Memphis	L 94–110	Álex Abrines (19)	Kaleb Tarczewski (10)	Russell Westbrook (4)	BOK Center (Tulsa); 17,022	1–3
5	October 16	Minnesota	W 112–94	Russell Westbrook (26)	Steven Adams (11)	Russell Westbrook (10)	Chesapeake Energy Arena; N/A	2–3
6	October 18	Denver	W 97–87	Steven Adams (17)	Steven Adams (9)	Russell Westbrook (9)	Chesapeake Energy Arena; N/A	3–3

2016–17 pre-season schedule

=== Regular season ===
2016–17 game log
Total: 47–35 (home: 28–13; road: 19–22)
October: 3–0 (home: 2–0; road: 1–0)

Game	Date	Team	Score	High points	High rebounds	High assists	Location Attendance	Record
1	October 26	@ Philadelphia	W 103–97	Russell Westbrook (32)	Russell Westbrook (12)	Russell Westbrook (9)	Wells Fargo Center; 9,420	1–0
2	October 28	Phoenix	W 113–110 (OT)	Russell Westbrook (51)	Russell Westbrook (13)	Russell Westbrook (10)	Chesapeake Energy Arena; 18,203	2–0
3	October 30	L. A. Lakers	W 113–96	Russell Westbrook (33)	Russell Westbrook (12)	Russell Westbrook (16)	Chesapeake Energy Arena; 18,203	3–0

November : 9–8 (home: 6–4; road: 3–4)

Game	Date	Team	Score	High points	High rebounds	High assists	Location Attendance	Record
4	November 2	@ L. A. Clippers	W 85–83	Russell Westbrook (35)	Enes Kanter (12)	Russell Westbrook (5)	Staples Center; 19,060	4–0
5	November 3	@ Golden State	L 96–122	Victor Oladipo (21)	Joffrey Lauvergne (7)	Russell Westbrook (10)	Oracle Arena; 19,596	4–1
6	November 5	Minnesota	W 112–92	Russell Westbrook (28)	Enes Kanter (10)	Russell Westbrook (8)	Chesapeake Energy Arena; 18,203	5–1
7	November 7	Miami	W 97–85	Enes Kanter (24)	Kanter & Sabonis (10)	Russell Westbrook (11)	Chesapeake Energy Arena; 18,203	6–1
8	November 9	Toronto	L 102–112	Russell Westbrook (36)	Steven Adams (12)	Russell Westbrook (7)	Chesapeake Energy Arena; 18,203	6–2
9	November 11	L. A. Clippers	L 108–110	Russell Westbrook (29)	Russell Westbrook (14)	Russell Westbrook (9)	Chesapeake Energy Arena; 18,203	6–3
10	November 13	Orlando	L 117–119	Russell Westbrook (41)	Russell Westbrook (12)	Russell Westbrook (16)	Chesapeake Energy Arena; 18,203	6–4
11	November 14	@ Detroit	L 88–104	Russell Westbrook (33)	Russell Westbrook (15)	Russell Westbrook (8)	Palace of Auburn Hills; 14,172	6–5
12	November 16	Houston	W 105–103	Russell Westbrook (30)	Victor Oladipo (10)	Russell Westbrook (9)	Chesapeake Energy Arena; 18,203	7–5
13	November 18	Brooklyn	W 124–105	Russell Westbrook (30)	Russell Westbrook (11)	Russell Westbrook (13)	Chesapeake Energy Arena; 18,203	8–5
14	November 20	Indiana	L 111–115 (OT)	Russell Westbrook (31)	Russell Westbrook (11)	Russell Westbrook (15)	Chesapeake Energy Arena; 18,203	8–6
15	November 22	@ L. A. Lakers	L 109–111	Russell Westbrook (34)	Russell Westbrook (8)	Russell Westbrook (13)	Staples Center; 18,997	8–7
16	November 23	@ Sacramento	L 101–116	Russell Westbrook (31)	Russell Westbrook (11)	Russell Westbrook (9)	Golden 1 Center; 17,608	8–8
17	November 25	@ Denver	W 132–129 (OT)	Russell Westbrook (36)	Russell Westbrook (12)	Russell Westbrook (18)	Pepsi Center; 14,327	9–8
18	November 26	Detroit	W 106–88	Anthony Morrow (21)	Russell Westbrook (13)	Russell Westbrook (15)	Chesapeake Energy Arena; 18,203	10–8
19	November 28	@ New York	W 112–103	Russell Westbrook (27)	Russell Westbrook (18)	Russell Westbrook (14)	Madison Square Garden; 19,812	11–8
20	November 30	Washington	W 126–115 (OT)	Russell Westbrook (35)	Russell Westbrook (14)	Russell Westbrook (11)	Chesapeake Energy Arena; 18,203	12–8

December : 9–5 (home: 5–2; road: 4–3)

Game	Date	Team	Score	High points	High rebounds	High assists	Location Attendance	Record
21	December 4	New Orleans	W 101–92	Russell Westbrook (28)	Russell Westbrook (17)	Russell Westbrook (12)	Chesapeake Energy Arena; 18,203	13–8
22	December 5	@ Atlanta	W 102–99	Russell Westbrook (32)	Russell Westbrook (13)	Russell Westbrook (12)	Philips Arena; 14,654	14–8
23	December 9	Houston	L 99–102	Russell Westbrook (27)	Russell Westbrook (10)	Russell Westbrook (10)	Chesapeake Energy Arena; 18,203	14–9
24	December 11	Boston	W 99–96	Russell Westbrook (37)	Russell Westbrook (12)	Russell Westbrook (6)	Chesapeake Energy Arena; 18,203	15–9
25	December 13	@ Portland	L 95–114	Russell Westbrook (20)	Domantas Sabonis (9)	Russell Westbrook (6)	Moda Center; 19,505	15–10
26	December 14	@ Utah	L 89–109	Russell Westbrook (25)	Russell Westbrook (6)	Russell Westbrook (5)	Vivint Smart Home Arena; 19,911	15–11
27	December 17	Phoenix	W 114–101	Russell Westbrook (26)	Russell Westbrook (11)	Russell Westbrook (22)	Chesapeake Energy Arena; 18,203	16–11
28	December 19	Atlanta	L 108–110	Russell Westbrook (46)	Russell Westbrook (11)	Russell Westbrook (7)	Chesapeake Energy Arena; 18,203	16–12
29	December 21	@ New Orleans	W 121–110	Russell Westbrook (42)	Enes Kanter (14)	Russell Westbrook (7)	Smoothie King Center; 16,375	17–12
30	December 23	@ Boston	W 117–112	Russell Westbrook (45)	Russell Westbrook (11)	Russell Westbrook (11)	TD Garden; 18,624	18–12
31	December 25	Minnesota	W 112–100	Russell Westbrook (31)	Westbrook, Sabonis (7)	Russell Westbrook (15)	Chesapeake Energy Arena; 18,203	19–12
32	December 27	@ Miami	W 106–94	Russell Westbrook (29)	Russell Westbrook (17)	Russell Westbrook (11)	American Airlines Arena; 19,977	20–12
33	December 29	@ Memphis	L 80–114	Russell Westbrook (21)	Steven Adams (15)	Semaj Christon (4)	FedEx Forum; 18,119	20–13
34	December 31	L. A. Clippers	W 114–88	Enes Kanter (23)	Russell Westbrook (12)	Russell Westbrook (14)	Chesapeake Energy Arena; 18,203	21–13

January : 7–8 (home: 3–0; road: 4–8)

Game	Date	Team	Score	High points	High rebounds	High assists	Location Attendance	Record
35	January 2	@ Milwaukee	L 94–98	Russell Westbrook (30)	Steven Adams (8)	Russell Westbrook (6)	BMO Harris Bradley Center; 17,423	21–14
36	January 4	@ Charlotte	L 112–123	Russell Westbrook (33)	Russell Westbrook (15)	Russell Westbrook (8)	Time Warner Cable Arena; 18,418	21–15
37	January 5	@ Houston	L 116–118	Russell Westbrook (49)	Enes Kanter (13)	Russell Westbrook (5)	Toyota Center; 18,055	21–16
38	January 7	Denver	W 121–106	Russell Westbrook (32)	Russell Westbrook (17)	Russell Westbrook (11)	Chesapeake Energy Arena; 18,203	22–16
39	January 9	@ Chicago	W 109–94	Steven Adams (22)	Enes Kanter (11)	Russell Westbrook (14)	United Center; 21,923	23–16
40	January 11	Memphis	W 103–95	Russell Westbrook (24)	Kanter, Westbrook (13)	Russell Westbrook (12)	Chesapeake Energy Arena; 16,236	24–16
41	January 13	@ Minnesota	L 86–96	Kanter, Westbrook (21)	Russell Westbrook (12)	Russell Westbrook (11)	Target Center; 16,644	24–17
42	January 15	@ Sacramento	W 122–118	Russell Westbrook (36)	Enes Kanter (12)	Russell Westbrook (10)	Golden 1 Center; 17,608	25–17
43	January 16	@ L.A. Clippers	L 98–120	Russell Westbrook (24)	Joffrey Lauvergne (9)	Westbrook, Sabonis (4)	Staples Center; 19,060	25–18
44	January 18	@ Golden State	L 100–121	Russell Westbrook (27)	Russell Westbrook (15)	Russell Westbrook (13)	Oracle Arena; 19,596	25–19
45	January 23	@ Utah	W 97–95	Russell Westbrook (38)	Andre Roberson (11)	Russell Westbrook (10)	Vivint Smart Home Arena; 19,911	26–19
46	January 25	@ New Orleans	W 114–105	Russell Westbrook (27)	Russell Westbrook (12)	Russell Westbrook (10)	Smoothie King Center; 15,277	27–19
47	January 26	Dallas	W 109–98	Russell Westbrook (45)	Westbrook, Roberson (8)	Westbrook, Oladipo (3)	Chesapeake Energy Arena; 18,203	28–19
48	January 29	@ Cleveland	L 91–107	Russell Westbrook (20)	Russell Westbrook (12)	Russell Westbrook (10)	Quicken Loans Arena; 20,562	28–20
49	January 31	@ San Antonio	L 94–108	Russell Westbrook (27)	Steven Adams (12)	Russell Westbrook (14)	AT&T Center; 18,418	28–21

February : 7–4 (home: 7–2; road: 0–2)

Game	Date	Team	Score	High points	High rebounds	High assists	Location Attendance	Record
50	February 1	Chicago	L 100–128	Russell Westbrook (28)	Adams, Roberson (8)	Russell Westbrook (8)	Chesapeake Energy Arena; 18,203	28–22
51	February 3	Memphis	W 114–102	Russell Westbrook (38)	Adams, Westbrook (13)	Russell Westbrook (12)	Chesapeake Energy Arena; 18,203	29–22
52	February 5	Portland	W 105–99	Russell Westbrook (42)	Adams, Oladipo (13)	Russell Westbrook (8)	Chesapeake Energy Arena; 18,203	30–22
53	February 6	@ Indiana	L 90–93	Russell Westbrook (27)	Russell Westbrook (18)	Russell Westbrook (9)	Bankers Life Fieldhouse; 16,123	30–23
54	February 9	Cleveland	W 118–109	Russell Westbrook (29)	Steven Adams (13)	Russell Westbrook (11)	Chesapeake Energy Arena; 18,203	31–23
55	February 11	Golden State	L 114–130	Russell Westbrook (47)	Westbrook, Roberson (11)	Russell Westbrook (8)	Chesapeake Energy Arena; 18,203	31–24
56	February 13	@ Washington	L 98–120	Lauvergne, Westbrook (17)	Steven Adams (11)	Grant, Lauvergne, Westbrook (4)	Verizon Center; 20,356	31–25
57	February 15	New York	W 116–105	Russell Westbrook (38)	Russell Westbrook (14)	Russell Westbrook (12)	Chesapeake Energy Arena; 18,203	32–25
All-Star Break
58	February 24	L.A. Lakers	W 110–93	Russell Westbrook (17)	Russell Westbrook (18)	Russell Westbrook (17)	Chesapeake Energy Arena; 18,203	33–25
59	February 26	New Orleans	W 118–110	Russell Westbrook (41)	Russell Westbrook (11)	Russell Westbrook (11)	Chesapeake Energy Arena; 18,203	34–25
60	February 28	Utah	W 109–106	Russell Westbrook (43)	Russell Westbrook (11)	Russell Westbrook (10)	Chesapeake Energy Arena; 18,203	35–25

March : 8–7 (home: 4–3; road: 4–4)

Game	Date	Team	Score	High points	High rebounds	High assists	Location Attendance	Record
61	March 2	@ Portland	L 109–114	Russell Westbrook (45)	Enes Kanter (10)	Russell Westbrook (4)	Moda Center; 19,875	35–26
62	March 3	@ Phoenix	L 111–118	Russell Westbrook (48)	Russell Westbrook (17)	Russell Westbrook (9)	Talking Stick Resort Arena; 18,055	35–27
63	March 5	@ Dallas	L 89–104	Russell Westbrook (29)	Enes Kanter (10)	Russell Westbrook (5)	American Airlines Center; 20,232	35–28
64	March 7	Portland	L 121–126	Russell Westbrook (58)	Taj Gibson (8)	Russell Westbrook (9)	Chesapeake Energy Arena; 18,203	35–29
65	March 9	San Antonio	W 102–92	Russell Westbrook (23)	Russell Westbrook (13)	Russell Westbrook (13)	Chesapeake Energy Arena; 18,203	36–29
66	March 11	Utah	W 112–104	Russell Westbrook (33)	Russell Westbrook (11)	Russell Westbrook (14)	Chesapeake Energy Arena; 18,203	37–29
67	March 14	@ Brooklyn	W 122–104	Russell Westbrook (25)	Russell Westbrook (12)	Russell Westbrook (19)	Barclays Center; 13,911	38–29
68	March 16	@ Toronto	W 123–102	Russell Westbrook (24)	Russell Westbrook (10)	Russell Westbrook (16)	Air Canada Centre; 19,800	39–29
69	March 18	Sacramento	W 110–94	Russell Westbrook (28)	Steven Adams (13)	Russell Westbrook (10)	Chesapeake Energy Arena; 18,203	40–29
70	March 20	Golden State	L 95–111	Victor Oladipo (17)	Enes Kanter (10)	Russell Westbrook (7)	Chesapeake Energy Arena; 18,203	40–30
71	March 22	Philadelphia	W 122–97	Enes Kanter (24)	Enes Kanter, Westbrook (11)	Russell Westbrook (14)	Chesapeake Energy Arena; 18,203	41–30
72	March 26	@ Houston	L 125–137	Russell Westbrook (39)	Russell Westbrook (11)	Russell Westbrook (13)	Toyota Center; 18,055	41–31
73	March 27	@ Dallas	W 92–91	Russell Westbrook (37)	Russell Westbrook (13)	Russell Westbrook (10)	American Airlines Center; 19,970	42–31
74	March 29	@ Orlando	W 114–106 (OT)	Russell Westbrook (57)	Russell Westbrook (13)	Russell Westbrook (11)	Amway Center; 18,408	43–31
75	March 31	San Antonio	L 95–100	Russell Westbrook (32)	Russell Westbrook (15)	Russell Westbrook (12)	Chesapeake Energy Arena; 18,203	43–32

April : 4–3 (home: 1–2; road: 3–1)

Game	Date	Team	Score	High points	High rebounds	High assists	Location Attendance	Record
76	April 2	Charlotte	L 101–113	Russell Westbrook (40)	Russell Westbrook (13)	Russell Westbrook (10)	Chesapeake Energy Arena; 18,203	43–33
77	April 4	Milwaukee	W 110–79	Enes Kanter (17)	Russell Westbrook (13)	Russell Westbrook (13)	Chesapeake Energy Arena; 18,203	44–33
78	April 5	@ Memphis	W 103–100	Russell Westbrook (45)	Steven Adams (10)	Russell Westbrook (10)	FedEx Forum; 17,298	45–33
79	April 7	@ Phoenix	L 99–120	Russell Westbrook (23)	Russell Westbrook (12)	Russell Westbrook (8)	Talking Stick Resort; 18,055	45–34
80	April 9	@ Denver	W 106–105	Russell Westbrook (50)	Russell Westbrook (16)	Russell Westbrook (10)	Pepsi Center; 19,718	46–34
81	April 11	@ Minnesota	W 100–98	Victor Oladipo (20)	Oladipo, Sabonis (9)	Christon, Oladipo (8)	Target Center; 19,356	47–34
82	April 12	Denver	L 105–111	Grant, Gibson (13)	Taj Gibson (7)	Russell Westbrook (8)	Chesapeake Energy Arena; 18,203	47–35

2016–17 season schedule

=== Playoffs ===
2017 playoff game log
Total: 1–4 (home: 1–1; road: 0–3)
First Round: 1–4 (home: 1–1; road: 0–3)

Game	Date	Team	Score	High points	High rebounds	High assists	Location Attendance	Series
1	April 16	@ Houston	L 87–118	Russell Westbrook (22)	Russell Westbrook (11)	Russell Westbrook (7)	Toyota Center; 18,055	0–1
2	April 19	@ Houston	L 111–115	Russell Westbrook (51)	Russell Westbrook (10)	Russell Westbrook (13)	Toyota Center; 18,055	0–2
3	April 21	Houston	W 115–113	Russell Westbrook (32)	Russell Westbrook (13)	Russell Westbrook (11)	Chesapeake Energy Arena; 18,203	1–2
4	April 23	Houston	L 109–113	Russell Westbrook (35)	Russell Westbrook (14)	Russell Westbrook (14)	Chesapeake Energy Arena; 18,203	1–3
5	April 25	@ Houston	L 99–105	Russell Westbrook (47)	Russell Westbrook (11)	Russell Westbrook (9)	Toyota Center; 18,055	1–4

2017 playoff schedule

== Player statistics ==
Legend
GP	Games played	GS	Games started	MPG	Minutes per game
FG%	Field goal percentage	3P%	3-point field goal percentage	FT%	Free throw percentage
RPG	Rebounds per game	APG	Assists per game	SPG	Steals per game
BPG	Blocks per game	PPG	Points per game	**Bold**	Career high

=== Regular season ===
Oklahoma City Thunder statistics
Player	GP	GS	MPG	FG%	3P%	FT%	RPG	APG	SPG	BPG	PPG
Alex Abrines	68	6	15.5	39.3%	38.1%	89.8%	1.3	0.6	0.5	0.1	6.0
Steven Adams	80	80	29.9	57.1%	0.0%	61.1%	7.7	1.1	1.1	1.0	11.3
Semaj Christon	64	1	15.2	34.5%	19.0%	54.8%	1.4	2.0	0.4	0.1	2.9
Norris Cole ^{≠}	13	0	9.6	30.8%	23.1%	80.0%	0.8	1.1	0.6	0.0	3.3
Nick Collison	20	0	6.4	60.9%	0.0%	62.5%	1.6	0.6	0.1	0.1	1.7
Enes Kanter	72	0	21.3	54.5%	13.2%	78.6%	6.7	0.9	0.4	0.5	14.3
Taj Gibson ^{≠}	23	16	21.2	49.7%	100%	71.8%	4.5	0.6	0.6	0.7	9.0
Jerami Grant ^{≠}	78	4	19.1	46.9%	37.7%	61.9%	2.6	0.6	0.4	1.0	5.4
Josh Huestis	2	0	15.5	54.5%	50.0%	0.0%	4.5	1.5	0.0	1.5	7.0
Ersan Ilyasova ^{†}	3	0	20.7	37.5%	25.0%	-	5.3	0.3	1.0	0.3	5.0
Joffrey Lauvergne ^{†}	50	0	14.8	45.5%	34.6%	63.8%	3.7	1.0	0.4	0.1	5.7
Doug McDermott ^{≠}	22	1	19.5	45.2%	36.2%	70.6%	2.2	0.6	0.1	0.0	6.6
Anthony Morrow ^{†}	40	7	15.7	38.6%	29.4%	88.5%	0.7	0.5	0.6	0.1	5.8
Victor Oladipo	67	67	33.2	44.2%	36.1%	75.3%	4.3	2.6	1.2	0.3	15.9
Cameron Payne ^{†}	20	0	16.0	33.1%	30.8%	100%	1.6	2.0	0.5	0.2	5.3
Andre Roberson	79	79	30.1	46.4%	24.5%	42.3%	5.1	1.0	1.2	1.0	6.6
Domantas Sabonis	81	66	20.1	39.9%	32.1%	65.7%	3.6	1.0	0.5	0.4	5.9
Kyle Singler	32	2	12.0	41.0%	18.9%	76.5%	1.5	0.3	0.2	0.2	2.8
Russell Westbrook	81	81	34.6	42.5%	34.3%	84.5%	10.7	10.4	1.6	0.4	31.6

Led team in statistic

After all games.
^{‡} Waived during the season
^{†} Traded during the season
^{≠} Acquired during the season

=== Playoffs ===
Oklahoma City Thunder statistics
Player	GP	GS	MPG	FG%	3P%	FT%	RPG	APG	SPG	BPG	PPG
Alex Abrines	5	0	16.0	34.8%	29.4%	75.0%	1.8	0.8	0.0	0.0	4.8
Steven Adams	5	5	31.4	64.3%	-	36.4%	6.8	1.4	1.2	1.8	8.0
Semaj Christon	2	0	10.5	40.0%	33.3%	-	1.5	2.5	0.5	0.0	2.5
Norris Cole	4	0	6.3	25.0%	25.0%	-	0.3	0.3	0.0	0.3	1.3
Enes Kanter	5	0	9.0	38.5%	-	100%	1.8	0.2	0.0	0.8	4.8
Taj Gibson	5	5	23.6	60.0%	-	87.5%	3.6	0.6	0.2	0.0	9.8
Jerami Grant	5	0	22.2	61.3%	33.3%	85.7%	3.8	0.8	0.2	0.4	9.2
Doug McDermott	5	0	13.2	50.0%	53.8%	-	1.0	0.2	0.2	0.2	5.0
Victor Oladipo	5	5	36.2	34.4%	24.0%	100%	5.6	2.0	1.4	0.6	10.8
Andre Roberson	5	5	37.0	52.2%	41.2%	14.3%	6.2	1.8	2.4	3.4	11.6
Domantas Sabonis	2	0	3.0	0.0%	0.0%	100%	1.0	0.0	0.5	0.5	2.0
Kyle Singler	1	0	10.0	0.0%	-	-	1.0	0.0	0.0	0.0	0.0
Russell Westbrook	5	5	38.8	38.8%	26.5%	80.0%	11.6	10.8	2.4	0.4	37.4

Led team in statistic

After all games.

=== Individual game highs ===
Category	Player	Statistic
Points	Russell Westbrook	58 vs Trail Blazers on March 7, 2017
Rebounds	Russell Westbrook; Russell Westbrook	18 vs Pacers on February 6, 2017; 20 vs Lakers on February 24, 2017
Assists	Russell Westbrook	22 vs Suns on December 17, 2016
Steals	Andre Roberson; Andre Roberson	5 vs Suns on October 28, 2016; 5 vs Timberwolves on January 13, 2017
Blocks	Jerami Grant	5 vs Pacers on February 6, 2017
Minutes	Victor Oladipo	45:28 vs Wizards on November 30, 2016

Category	Player	Statistic
Field goals made	Russell Westbrook; Russell Westbrook	21 vs Trail Blazers on March 7, 2017; 21 vs Magic on March 29, 2017
Threes made	Russell Westbrook; Russell Westbrook	8 vs Rockets on February 5, 2017; 8 vs Grizzlies on April 5, 2017
Free throws made	Russell Westbrook; Russell Westbrook	17 vs Grizzlies on February 3, 2017; 17 vs Suns on March 3, 2017
Double-doubles	Russell Westbrook	62
Triple-doubles	Russell Westbrook	42

== Awards and records ==
=== Awards ===
Date	Player	Award
October 31, 2016	Russell Westbrook (1/4)	October 25–30 Player of the Week
December 1, 2016	Russell Westbrook (1/2)	October/November Player of the Month
December 5, 2016	Russell Westbrook (2/4)	November 28-December 4 Player of the Week
December 26, 2016	Russell Westbrook (3/4)	December 19–25 Player of the Week
January 26, 2017	Russell Westbrook	All-Star
March 2, 2017	Russell Westbrook (2/2)	March Player of the Month
April 10, 2017	Russell Westbrook (4/4)	April 3–9 Player of the Week
May 18, 2017	Russell Westbrook	All-NBA First Team
June 26, 2017	Andre Roberson	NBA All-Defensive Second Team
June 26, 2017	Russell Westbrook	NBA Most Valuable Player

== Transactions ==
=== Overview ===
Players Added

Via trade

- Ersan Ilyasova
- Victor Oladipo
- Joffrey Lauvergne
- Domantas Sabonis
  (Draft rights)

Via free agency

- Alex Abrines
  (Draft rights)
- Semaj Christon
  (Draft rights)
Players Lost

Via trade

- Serge Ibaka

Via free agency

- Kevin Durant
- Randy Foye
- Nazr Mohammed
- Dion Waiters

Waived

- Mitch McGary

=== Trades ===
June 23, 2016	To Oklahoma City Thunder Victor Oladipo; Ersan Ilyasova; Draft rights to Domantas Sabonis	To Orlando Magic Serge Ibaka
June 23, 2016	To Oklahoma City Thunder Draft rights to Daniel Hamilton	To Denver Nuggets Cash considerations
August 30, 2016	To Oklahoma City Thunder Joffrey Lauvergne	To Denver Nuggets Two 2017 second-round picks
November 1, 2016	To Oklahoma City Thunder Jerami Grant	To Philadelphia 76ers Ersan Ilyasova; 2020 first-round pick
February 23, 2017	To Oklahoma City Thunder Taj Gibson; Doug McDermott; 2018 second-round pick	To Chicago Bulls Joffrey Lauvergne; Anthony Morrow; Cameron Payne

=== Free agency ===
==== Re-signed ====
Date	Player	Contract
August 4, 2016	Russell Westbrook	Multi-Year Extension
October 31, 2016	Steven Adams	Multi-Year Extension
October 31, 2016	Victor Oladipo	Multi-Year Extension

==== Additions ====
Date	Player	Contract	Former team
July 23, 2016	Alex Abrines	Standard	(Spain) FC Barcelona
August 14, 2016	Ronnie Price	Standard	Phoenix Suns
August 20, 2016	Semaj Christon	Standard	Oklahoma City Blue (D-League)
In-Season Additions
March 1, 2017	Norris Cole	Standard	(China) Shandong Golden Stars

==== Subtractions ====
Date	Player	Reason left	New team
July 1, 2016	Nazr Mohammed	Free agent	N/A
July 7, 2016	Kevin Durant	Free agent	Golden State Warriors
July 15, 2016	Randy Foye	Free agent	Brooklyn Nets
July 26, 2016	Dion Waiters	Free agent	Miami Heat
October 24, 2016	Ronnie Price	Waived	Phoenix Suns
October 24, 2016	Mitch McGary	Waived	N/A
