= Steven Adams =

New Zealand basketball player (born 1993)

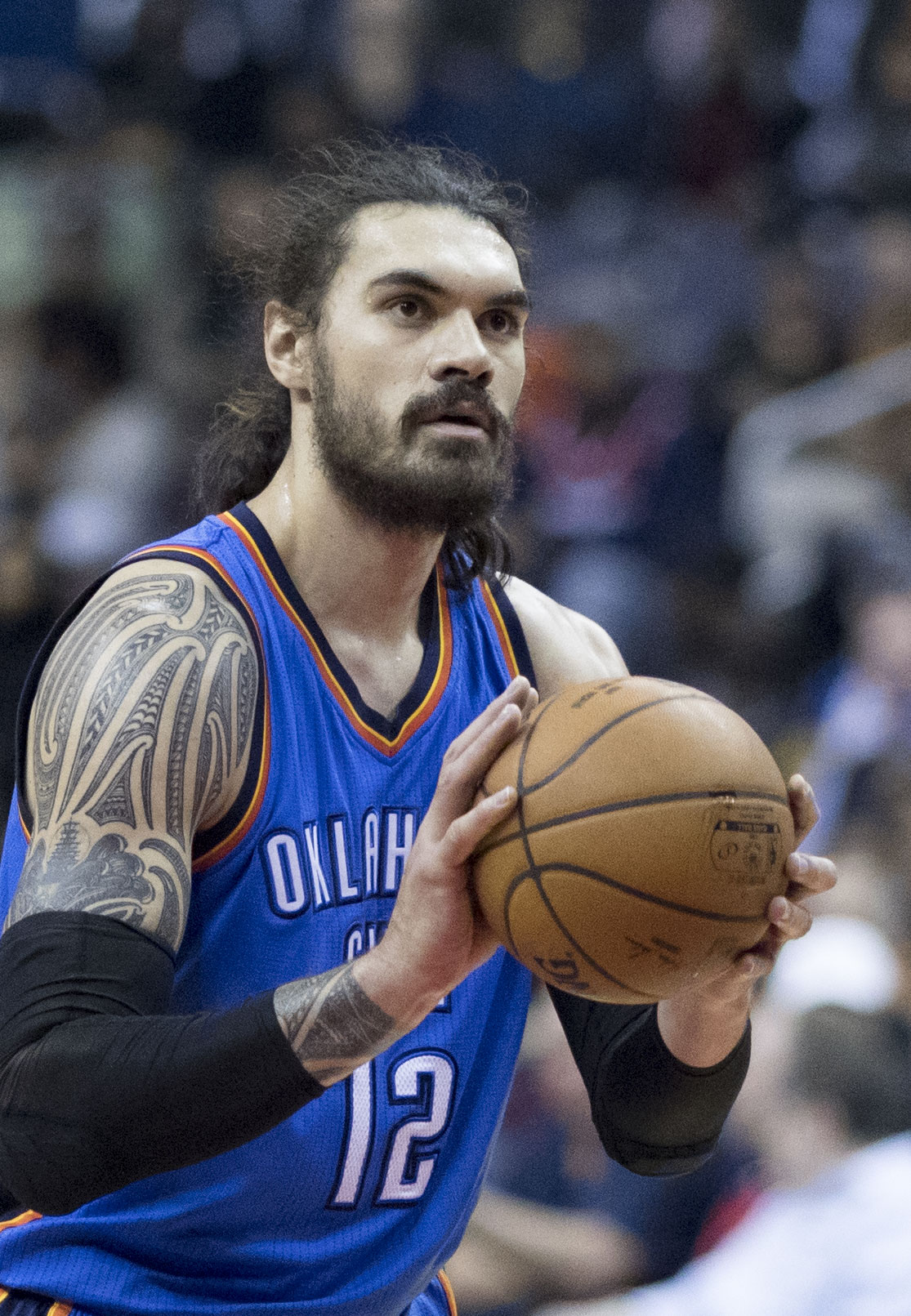
- Adams with the Oklahoma City Thunder in 2017

No. 12 – Houston Rockets
- Position: Center
- League: NBA

Personal information
- Born: 20 July 1993 (age 33) Rotorua, New Zealand
- Listed height: 6 ft 11 in (2.11 m)
- Listed weight: 279 lb (127 kg)

Career information
- High school: Rotorua Lakes (Rotorua, New Zealand); Scots College (Wellington, New Zealand); Notre Dame Prep (Fitchburg, Massachusetts)
- College: Pittsburgh (2012–2013)
- NBA draft: 2013: 1st round, 12th overall pick
- Drafted by: Oklahoma City Thunder
- Playing career: 2013–present

Career history
- 2011: Wellington Saints
- 2013–2020: Oklahoma City Thunder
- 2020–2021: New Orleans Pelicans
- 2021–2024: Memphis Grizzlies
- 2024–present: Houston Rockets

Career highlights
- NBA All-Rookie Second Team (2014); NZNBL champion (2011); NZNBL Rookie of the Year (2011); Big East All-Rookie Team (2013)
- Stats at NBA.com
- Stats at Basketball Reference

Steven Funaki Paea He Ofa Ki Loa Adams (born 20 July 1993) is a New Zealand professional basketball player for the Houston Rockets of the National Basketball Association (NBA). A center, Adams has played for four NBA teams since making his NBA debut in 2013.

After playing one season with the Wellington Saints in New Zealand in 2011, Adams moved to the United States in 2012 to play college basketball for the University of Pittsburgh. He played for the Panthers for one season and was then selected by the Oklahoma City Thunder with the 12th overall pick in the 2013 NBA draft. Following the 2013–14 season, Adams was named to NBA All-Rookie Second Team. In November 2020, after seven years in Oklahoma City, Adams was traded to the New Orleans Pelicans. In August 2021, he was traded to the Memphis Grizzlies, where he played until being traded to the Rockets in 2024. Adams is known for his physical strength.

== Early life ==
Steven Adams was born in Rotorua, New Zealand. His father, Sid Adams, was from Bristol, England and served in the Royal Navy. His mother, Lilika Ngauamo, was a nurse from the South Pacific island of Tonga. Adams is biracial. Sid Adams stood 2.11 metres (6 ft 11 in) tall. Two of Adams' half-sisters are athletes: Dame Valerie Adams is a dual Olympic gold medallist and four-time world champion shot-putter and Lisa Adams is a para athlete who has won gold at the Paralympics in shot-put. His brothers, Warren and Sid Jr., had careers in the New Zealand National Basketball League. Adams' sister, Gabriella Adams-Gavet, has played basketball for the New Zealand national team.

Sid Adams fathered a large number of children. Some sources indicate that he had 18 children by five different women, another states that he had 18 children by six different women, and other reports say he fathered 21 children by six different women. In Steven Adams's autobiography, My Life, My Fight (2018), he wrote, "'No one knows for sure how many kids my dad had. If you ask anyone in the media they’ll say he had 18, or maybe even 20, but they won’t know where that number came from. If you ask my sister Viv, she’ll say it's 16. I always thought there were 14 of us. Whatever the number, there will only ever be one Sid Adams'".

Lilika Ngauamo died of cancer in 2000. Sid Adams died of stomach cancer in 2007, when Adams was 13. Adams has identified his father's death as one of the defining events of his life. In a 2012 interview, Adams recalled:

When I lost my dad, that was a big hit for me. I didn't have that parental guidance, and I kind of took advantage of it because I was a stupid idiot. I decided not to go to school a couple of times, go when I felt like it. I always lied to my brothers and sisters. They'd ask: 'Are you going to school?' I'd say 'yeah'. They eventually found out.

After his father died, Adams left high school and joined a gang known as the Mongrel Mob. Blossom Cameron rescued Adams from the streets of Rotorua and took him to Wellington. Cameron took responsibility for Adams and introduced him to Wellington basketball coach Kenny McFadden. McFadden accepted Adams into his basketball academy, and Blossom Cameron enrolled him in Scots College. The only rule McFadden had for Adams was that he had to attend school every day if he wanted to play basketball. While there was pressure for Adams to turn professional straight out of high school because it was believed he would never be able to qualify for the NCAA, Adams did well at Scots College and passed through the NCAA Clearinghouse after graduating from Scots in December 2011.

== Preparatory school and college ==
After graduating from Scots College in December 2011, Adams enrolled at Notre Dame Preparatory School, a basketball prep school in Fitchburg, Massachusetts, for one semester. It was arranged so that he could acclimate himself to American basketball before enrolling at Pittsburgh in June 2012.

In his lone season at Pittsburgh, Adams was named the Big East Preseason Rookie of the Year and earned Big East All-Rookie Team honours. He started all 32 games during the 2012–13 season and averaged 7.2 points, 6.3 rebounds, and 2.0 blocks per game. Following the season, Adams declared for the NBA draft, forgoing his final three years of college eligibility.

== Professional career ==
=== Wellington Saints (2011) ===
In 2011, Adams played for the Wellington Saints of the National Basketball League. He went unpaid by the Saints in order to keep his college eligibility. Adams was named the New Zealand NBL Rookie of the Year and helped the Saints win the championship. In 15 games for the Saints, he averaged 5.5 points and 4.1 rebounds per game.

=== Oklahoma City Thunder (2013–2020) ===
==== 2013–16: Early years ====
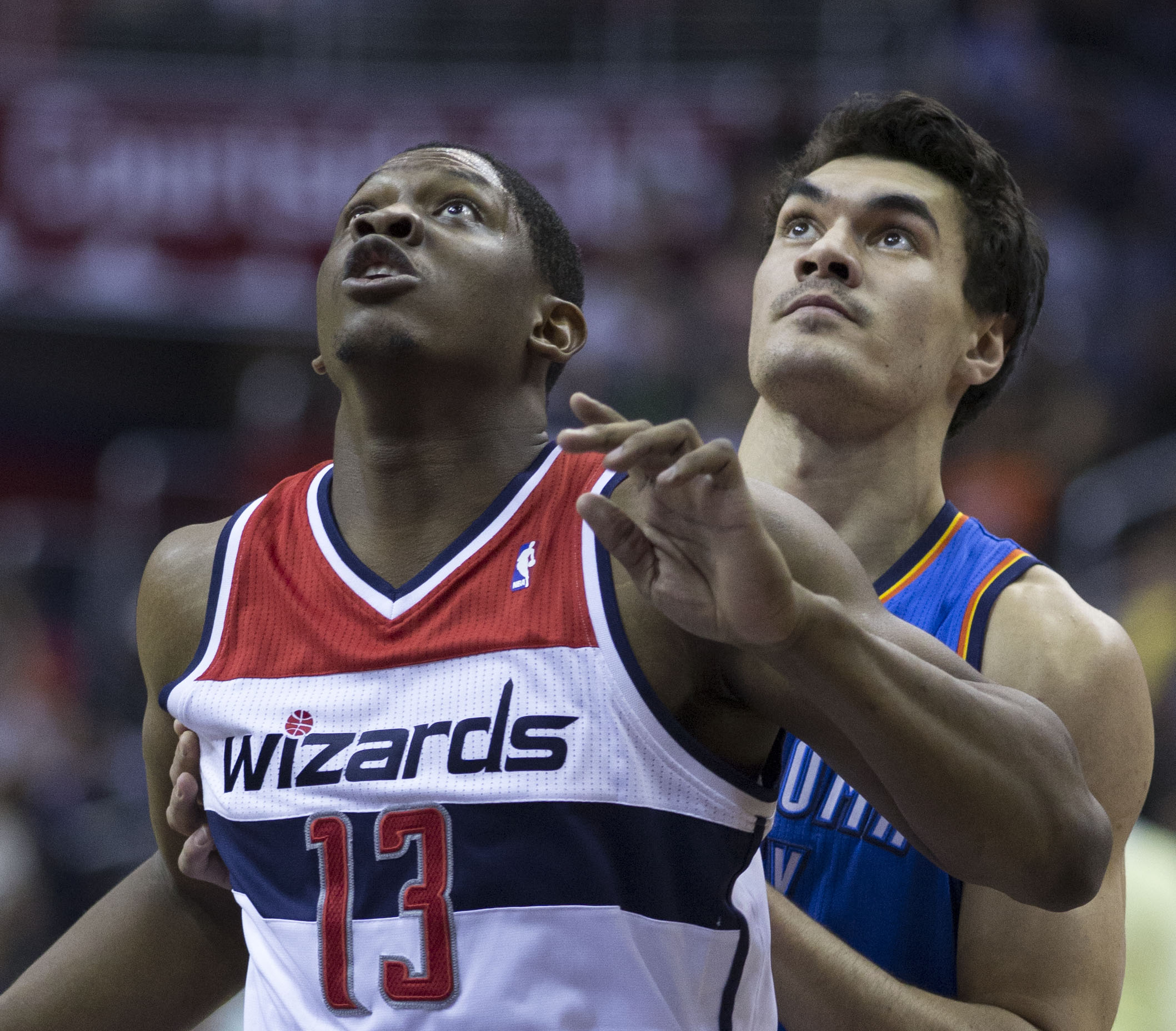
Adams (right) with the Thunder in February 2014, contesting with Kevin Séraphin of the Washington Wizards

On 27 June 2013, Adams was selected with the 12th overall pick in the 2013 NBA draft by the Oklahoma City Thunder, becoming just the second New Zealander to be selected in the NBA draft and the first New Zealander to be selected in the first round. He also became the first player out of Pittsburgh to be selected in the first round since 1999 when Vonteego Cummings was selected by the Indiana Pacers with the 26th overall pick. On 12 July, Adams signed his rookie scale contract with the Thunder.

In his NBA debut on 30 October 2013, Adams recorded two points, three rebounds, one assist and three fouls in 18½ minutes off the bench during a 101–98 victory over the Utah Jazz. Nine days later, in just his fifth NBA game, Adams recorded 17 points and 10 rebounds in a 119–110 victory over the Detroit Pistons. He failed to surpass either mark for the rest of the regular season. Adams appeared in 81 games (20 starts) and averaged 3.3 points, 4.1 rebounds (ninth among NBA rookies) and 0.7 blocks (ninth among NBA rookies) in 14.8 minutes. In Game 6 of the Thunder's second-round playoff series against the Los Angeles Clippers, Adams recorded 10 points and a season-high 11 rebounds. The Thunder reached the Western Conference Finals, where they were defeated by the San Antonio Spurs in six games. At the conclusion of the 2013–14 season, Adams earned NBA All-Rookie Second Team honours.

On 16 November 2014, Adams recorded a career-high six blocks in a 69–65 loss to the Houston Rockets. On 25 December, he recorded a season-high 16 points and a then-career-high 15 rebounds in a 114–106 victory over the San Antonio Spurs. On 21 January 2015, Adams recorded a career-high 20 rebounds in a 105–103 overtime win over the Washington Wizards. He missed 11 straight games over February and March with a broken ring finger on his right hand. Adams scored a season-high 16 points three times during the 2014–15 season.

On 10 January 2016, Adams tied his career high of 17 points in a 115–110 loss to the Portland Trail Blazers. On 12 April, in the regular-season finale, Adams had another 17-point performance in a 102–98 loss to the San Antonio Spurs. In Game 2 of the Thunder's second-round playoff series against the Spurs, Adams recorded 12 points and 17 rebounds in the narrow 98–97 victory. Six days later in Game 4, he scored 16 points as the Thunder won 111–97. Adams helped the Thunder advance to the Western Conference Finals for the second time in three years, where, in Game 1 against the Golden State Warriors, he recorded 16 points and 12 rebounds in the 108–102 victory. In Game 3, Adams was kicked in the testes by Draymond Green, who maintained that the kick was inadvertent. Despite going up 3–1 in the series, the Thunder were defeated in seven games.

==== 2016–20: Increase in production ====
On 31 October 2016, Adams signed a four-year, $100 million contract extension with the Thunder. On 22 November, he scored a career-high 20 points in a 111–109 loss to the Los Angeles Lakers. Adams surpassed that mark on 9 December, scoring 24 points in a 102–99 loss to the Houston Rockets. His 17 points in the first half were a career high for a half.

On 1 December 2017, Adams scored a career-high 27 points on perfect shooting from the field and the free throw line to help the Thunder beat the Minnesota Timberwolves 111–107. On 2 February 2018, he had 23 points and 12 rebounds in a 114–100 loss to the New Orleans Pelicans, reaching 3,000 career points. Adams joined Kevin Durant and Serge Ibaka as the only Thunder players with at least 3,000 career points and 350 career blocks. On 13 February, Adams recorded 22 points and 17 rebounds in a 120–112 loss to the Cleveland Cavaliers. Twelve of his 17 rebounds were offensive, becoming the first ever Thunder player to grab 12 offensive rebounds in a game. In Game 6 of the Thunder's first-round playoff series against the Utah Jazz, Adams recorded 19 points and 16 rebounds in a 96–91 loss as the Thunder bowed out of the playoffs with a 4–2 defeat.

On 17 November 2018, Adams scored 26 points in a 110–100 victory over the Phoenix Suns. On 14 December, he recorded 26 points and 14 rebounds in a 109–98 loss to the Denver Nuggets. Five days later, Adams recorded 20 points and a career-high 23 rebounds in a 132–113 victory over the Sacramento Kings. On 3 March 2019, he recorded 13 points and 22 rebounds in a 99–95 victory over the Memphis Grizzlies.

=== New Orleans Pelicans (2020–2021) ===
On 24 November 2020, Adams was traded to the New Orleans Pelicans. As part of the deal, he signed a two-year, $35 million extension with the Pelicans. On 29 January 2021, Adams scored only four points, but grabbed a season-high 20 rebounds in a 131–126 victory over the Milwaukee Bucks. On 4 March, he scored a season-high 15 points in a 103–93 loss to the Miami Heat.

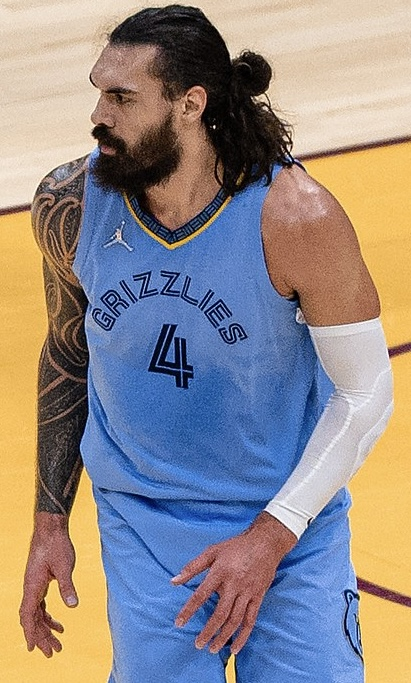
Adams with the Memphis Grizzlies in 2022

=== Memphis Grizzlies (2021–2024) ===
On 7 August 2021, Adams was traded to the Memphis Grizzlies. On 23 October, he scored a season-high 17 points, grabbed nine rebounds, and recorded five assists in a 120–114 victory over the Los Angeles Clippers. On 6 December, Adams helped lead the Grizzlies to a fifth straight win while tying his season high with 17 points scored, alongside grabbing 16 rebounds, in a 105–90 victory over the Miami Heat. On 26 February 2022, Adams scored 12 points and grabbed a season-high 21 rebounds, during a 116–110 victory over the Chicago Bulls.

On 2 October 2022, Adams signed a two-year, $25.2 million contract extension with the Grizzlies. On 18 January 2023, he scored a game-winning tip-in to defeat the Cleveland Cavaliers, 115–114. Four days later, Adams suffered a right knee injury during a 112–110 loss to the Phoenix Suns. On 24 January, the Grizzlies announced that he was diagnosed with a posterior cruciate ligament (PCL) sprain in his right knee and would be sidelined for three-to-five weeks. On 9 March, the Grizzlies announced that Adams had received a stem cell injection the day before and would be re-evaluated in four weeks, ending his regular-season run. Adams' ongoing recovery caused him to miss the playoffs; the second-seeded Grizzlies were eliminated by the seventh-seeded Lakers in the first round in six games.

Adams missed the entire 2023–24 NBA season as he underwent surgery on his PCL, which had not responded to non-operative rehabilitation.

=== Houston Rockets (2024–present) ===
On 1 February 2024, Adams was traded to the Houston Rockets in exchange for Victor Oladipo and three future second-round picks. On 28 October, Adams made his Rockets debut, putting up six points and three rebounds in 14 minutes off the bench in a 106–101 victory over the San Antonio Spurs. On 5 January 2025, after fully recovering from PCL surgery, Adams recorded a near double-double with eight points, nine rebounds, an assist, a block, and a steal in 17 minutes of action off the bench in a 119–115 victory over the Los Angeles Lakers. On 22 January, Adams recorded three points, a season-high 11 rebounds, two assists, and two blocks in 19 minutes off the bench in a narrow 109–108 victory against the Cleveland Cavaliers. Eight days later, Adams made his first start of the season, recording a double-double with 11 points, 10 rebounds, and three assists in a narrow 120–119 loss to his former team, the Memphis Grizzlies.

On 2 May 2025, during the first round of the playoffs, Adams recorded 17 points, five rebounds and three blocks in a 115–107 Game 6 victory over the Golden State Warriors. The Rockets went on to lose the series in seven games.

On 18 June 2025, the Rockets signed Adams to a three-year, $39 million contract extension. He made 32 appearances (11 starts) for Houston during the 2025–26 NBA season, averaging 5.8 points, 8.6 rebounds, and 1.5 assists. Adams suffered an ankle injury during an 18 January 2026 game against the New Orleans Pelicans; he later underwent season-ending surgery to address the malady on 28 January.

== Player profile ==
Adams's playing style is characterised by offensive rebounding, interior defence and physical strength.[72][73][74]

Adams is generally well respected for his sense of humour, down-to-earth personality, and humility. On 14 December 2018, playing against the Denver Nuggets, he received praise for catching his opponent Mason Plumlee after Plumlee jumped to contest a layup and fell over Adams. Despite having an uncontested shot, Adams chose to drop the ball and catch Plumlee, preventing a serious injury.

== Career statistics ==
Legend
GP	Games played	GS	Games started	MPG	Minutes per game
FG%	Field goal percentage	3P%	3-point field goal percentage	FT%	Free throw percentage
RPG	Rebounds per game	APG	Assists per game	SPG	Steals per game
BPG	Blocks per game	PPG	Points per game	**Bold**	Career high

=== NBA ===
==== Regular season ====
Year	Team	GP	GS	MPG	FG%	3P%	FT%	RPG	APG	SPG	BPG	PPG
2013–14	Oklahoma City	**81**	20	14.8	.503	–	.581	4.1	.5	.5	.7	3.3
2014–15	Oklahoma City	70	67	25.3	.544	.000	.502	7.5	.9	.5	**1.2**	7.7
2015–16	Oklahoma City	80	**80**	25.2	.613	–	.582	6.7	.8	.5	1.1	8.0
2016–17	Oklahoma City	80	**80**	29.9	.571	.000	**.611**	7.7	1.1	1.1	1.0	11.3
2017–18	Oklahoma City	76	76	32.7	**.629**	.000	.559	9.0	1.2	1.2	1.0	**13.9**
2018–19	Oklahoma City	80	**80**	**33.4**	.595	.000	.500	9.5	1.6	**1.5**	1.0	**13.9**
2019–20	Oklahoma City	63	63	26.7	.592	**.333**	.582	9.3	2.3	.8	1.1	10.9
2020–21	New Orleans	58	58	27.7	.614	.000	.444	8.9	1.9	.9	.7	7.6
2021–22	Memphis	76	75	26.3	.547	.000	.543	10.0	**3.4**	.9	.8	6.9
2022–23	Memphis	42	42	27.0	.597	.000	.364	**11.5**	2.3	.9	1.1	8.6
2024–25	Houston	58	3	13.7	.545	.000	.462	5.6	1.1	.4	.5	3.9
2025–26	Houston	32	11	22.8	.504	–	.580	8.6	1.5	.7	.6	5.8
Career		796	655	25.7	.584	.059	.534	8.0	1.5	.8	.9	8.7

==== Playoffs ====
Year	Team	GP	GS	MPG	FG%	3P%	FT%	RPG	APG	SPG	BPG	PPG
2014	Oklahoma City	**18**	0	18.4	**.689**	—	.348	4.1	.2	.1	1.3	3.9
2016	Oklahoma City	**18**	**18**	30.7	.613	.000	.630	9.5	.7	.5	.8	10.1
2017	Oklahoma City	5	5	31.4	.643	—	.364	6.8	1.4	**1.2**	**1.8**	8.0
2018	Oklahoma City	6	6	**33.4**	.587	—	**.692**	7.5	1.5	.7	.7	10.5
2019	Oklahoma City	5	5	31.8	.667	.000	.375	7.2	1.4	1.0	1.0	**11.5**
2020	Oklahoma City	7	7	30.0	.596	.000	.450	**11.6**	1.3	.6	.3	10.1
2022	Memphis	7	5	16.3	.429	—	.545	6.4	**2.1**	.1	.1	3.4
2025	Houston	7	0	22.1	.600	—	.533	6.6	.6	.4	1.1	5.7
Career		73	46	25.7	.614	.000	.534	7.3	.9	.5	.9	7.5

=== College statistics ===
Year	Team	GP	GS	MPG	FG%	3P%	FT%	RPG	APG	SPG	BPG	PPG
2012–13	Pittsburgh	32	32	23.4	.571	.000	.443	6.3	0.6	0.7	2.0	7.2

== Personal life ==
Adams enjoys playing video games; he has said that Dota 2 and Smite are his favourites.

In 2018, Adams published an autobiography entitled Steven Adams: My Life, My Fight. The book was co-written by childhood friend and journalist Madeleine Chapman.

An interview with Adams was featured in the 2022 documentary film Dame Valerie Adams: More than Gold. In the interview, Adams discusses the childhood of his sister, Olympic shot putter Valerie Adams.

== See also ==
- List of NBA career field goal percentage leaders
