= Rachel DeMita =

American basketball player (born 1990)

Rachel Annamarie DeMita (born June 14, 1990), is a sports reporter and former Old Dominion University women's basketball player. DeMita’s sports show, Courtside Club, is syndicated on SiriusXM. DeMita has over 1.5 million followers across her social media profiles, including YouTube, Instagram, and TikTok. DeMita is represented by UTA. She is married to professional basketball player André Roberson.

DeMita has been an NBA digital host for over a decade. DeMita was the NBA 2K first in game video host and production of the weekly NBA 2K show from 2014 to 2018.

DeMita was an official FIFA content creator for the 2026 World Cup, and the most prolific poster among the tournament's top five creators.

== See also ==
- Sports journalism
