= André Roberson =

American basketball player (born 1991)

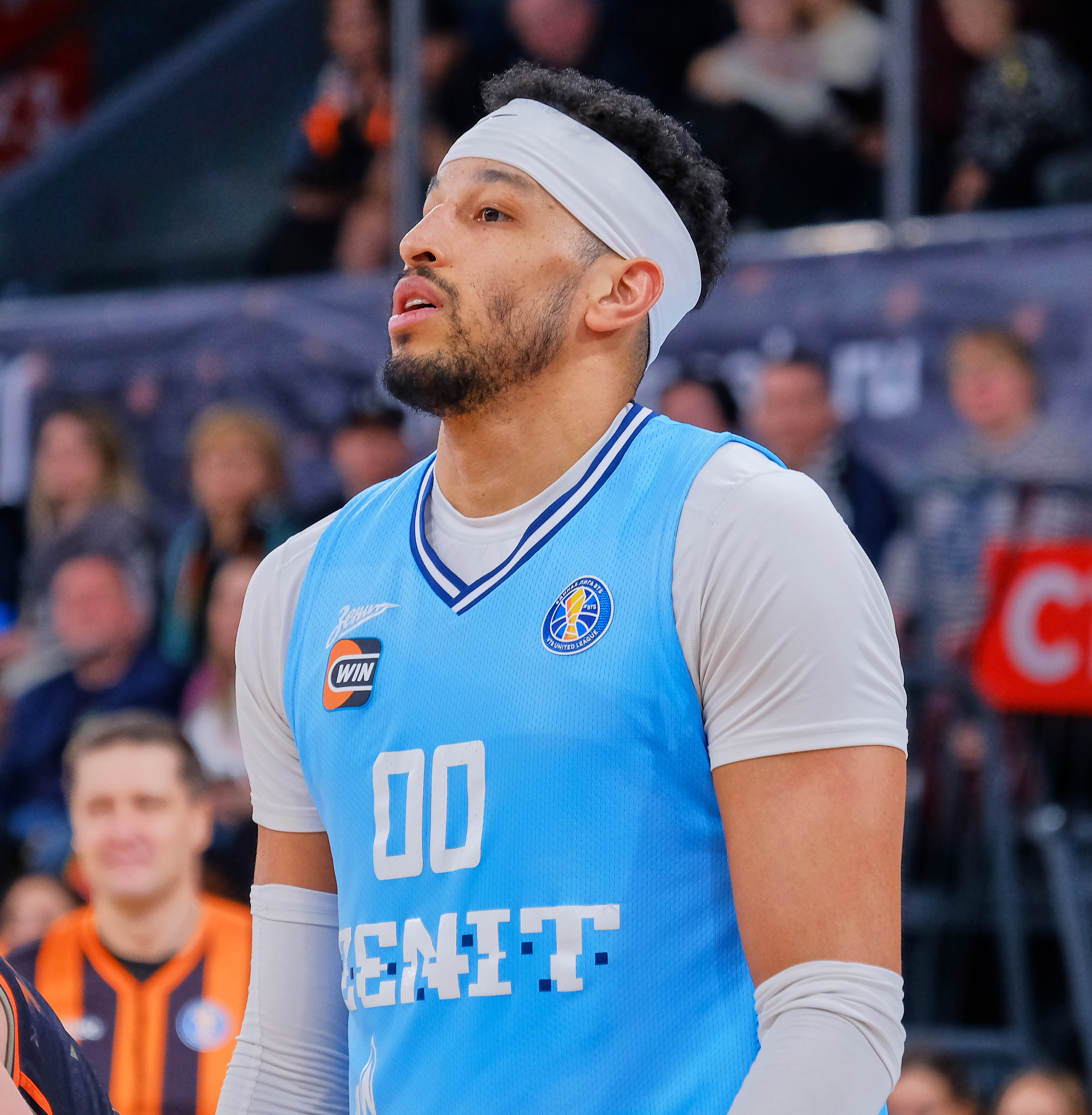
- Roberson with Zenit Saint Petersburg in 2026

No. 21 – Zenit Saint Petersburg
- Position: Small forward / power forward
- League: VTB United League

Personal information
- Born: December 4, 1991 (age 34) Las Cruces, New Mexico, U.S.
- Listed height: 6 ft 7 in (2.01 m)
- Listed weight: 210 lb (95 kg)

Career information
- High school: Wagner (San Antonio, Texas)
- College: Colorado (2010–2013)
- NBA draft: 2013: 1st round, 26th overall pick
- Drafted by: Minnesota Timberwolves
- Playing career: 2013–present

Career history
- 2013–2020: Oklahoma City Thunder
- 2013–2014: →Tulsa 66ers
- 2021: Brooklyn Nets
- 2023: Oklahoma City Blue
- 2024: Cholet
- 2024–2025: ASVEL
- 2025–present: Zenit Saint Petersburg

Career highlights
- NBA All-Defensive Second Team (2017); All-LNB Élite Second Team (2025); 2× First-team All-Pac-12 (2012, 2013); Pac-12 Defensive Player of the Year (2013)
- Stats at NBA.com
- Stats at Basketball Reference

André Lee Roberson (born December 4, 1991) is an American professional basketball player for Zenit Saint Petersburg of the VTB United League. He played college basketball for the Colorado Buffaloes. As a junior in 2013, Roberson earned first-team all-conference honors in the Pac-12 for the second time and was also named the Pac-12 Defensive Player of the Year. He was selected in the first round of the 2013 NBA draft with the 26th overall pick by the Minnesota Timberwolves, but was acquired by the Oklahoma City Thunder in a draft night trade. Roberson was named to the NBA All-Defensive Second Team in 2017.

== High school career ==
Roberson attended Karen Wagner High School on the outskirts of San Antonio. During his senior year, Roberson averaged 15 points, 12 rebounds, and 1.7 blocked shots per game. Considered a three-star recruit by ESPN.com, he was listed as the No. 62 power forward in the nation in 2010.

== College career ==
Roberson played for the Colorado Buffaloes under coach Tad Boyle. In his three seasons at CU, Roberson was one of the country's top rebounders, finishing third in the country in 2011–12 and second in 2012–13. He led the Buffaloes to the NCAA Tournament both years.

As a junior in 2012–13, Roberson averaged 10.9 points and 11.2 rebounds per game. He was named first-team All-Pac-12 and the conference Defensive Player of the Year. At the end of his junior season, Roberson announced that he was forgoing his remaining NCAA eligibility to enter the 2013 NBA draft.

== Professional career ==
=== Oklahoma City Thunder (2013–2020) ===
Roberson was selected with the 26th overall pick in the 2013 NBA draft by the Minnesota Timberwolves, but was later acquired by the Oklahoma City Thunder on draft night. On July 12, he signed with the Thunder after an impressive Summer League performance. During his rookie season, Roberson had multiple assignments with the Tulsa 66ers of the NBA Development League.

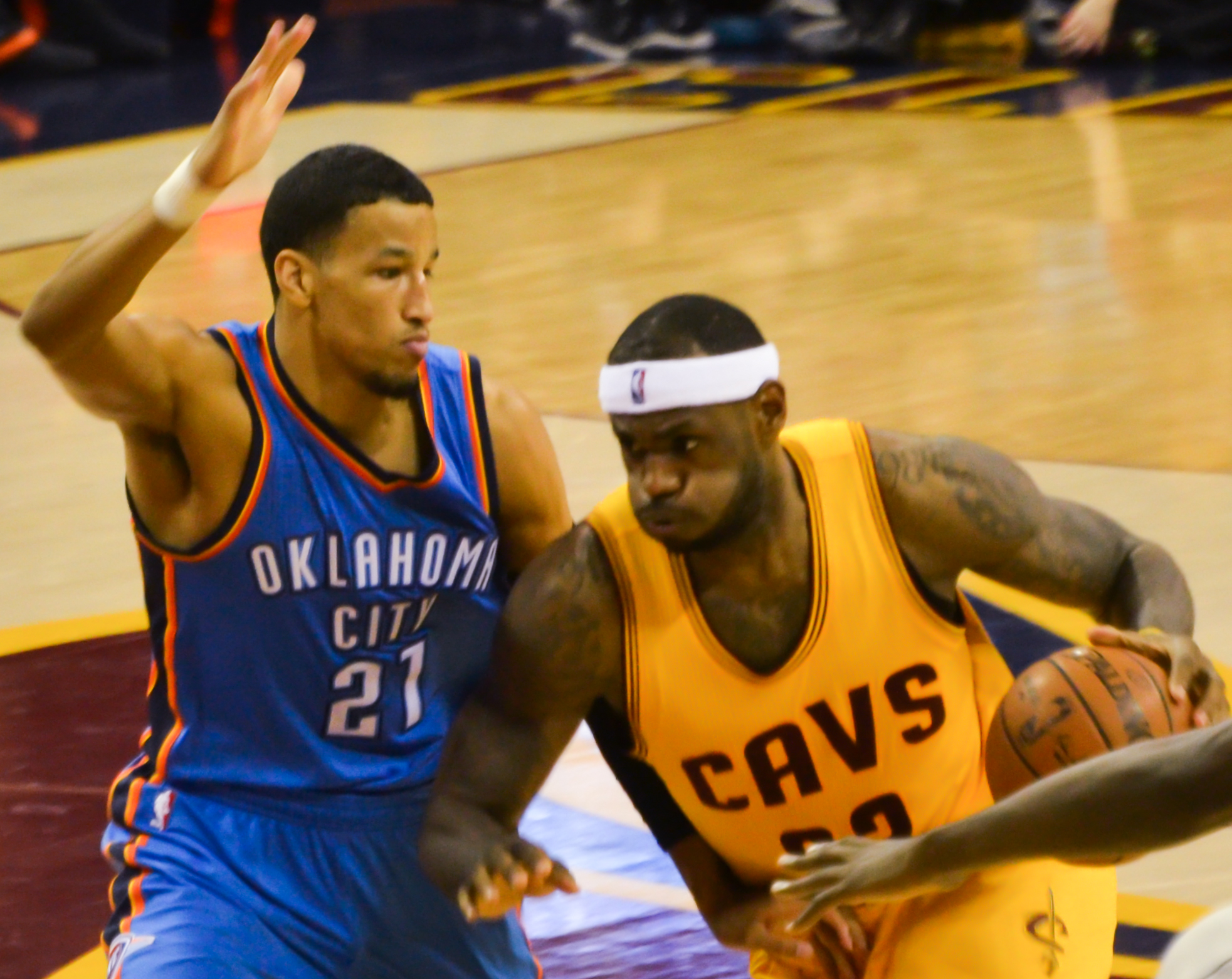
Roberson defends LeBron James in January 2015

In July 2014, Roberson re-joined the Thunder for the 2014 NBA Summer League. On October 22, 2014, the Thunder exercised their third-year team option on Roberson's rookie scale contract, extending the contract through the 2015–16 season. Earning the Thunder's starting shooting guard spot for the 2014–15 season, Roberson recorded his first career double-double (10 points, 12 rebounds) on December 18 against the Golden State Warriors, and scored a then career-high 12 points on February 9 against the Denver Nuggets.

On October 23, 2015, the Thunder exercised their fourth-year team option on Roberson's rookie scale contract, extending the contract through the 2016–17 season. He retained the starting shooting guard spot in 2015–16, and on December 23, Roberson scored a then career-high 15 points in a 120–85 victory over the Los Angeles Lakers. On January 25, 2016, he was ruled out for three weeks with a right knee sprain. Roberson returned to action on February 24 after missing 10 games. In Game 4 of the Western Conference Finals, he scored a career-high 17 points and grabbed 12 rebounds, as the Thunder defeated the Golden State Warriors 118–94 to take a 3–1 lead in the series. However, the Thunder went on to lose the series in seven games.

Roberson was moved to the starting small forward spot for the 2016–17 season due to the loss of Kevin Durant and the acquisition of Victor Oladipo. On February 24, 2017, Roberson set a new career high with 19 points in a 110–93 victory over the Los Angeles Lakers. At the season's end, he was named to the NBA All-Defensive Second Team.

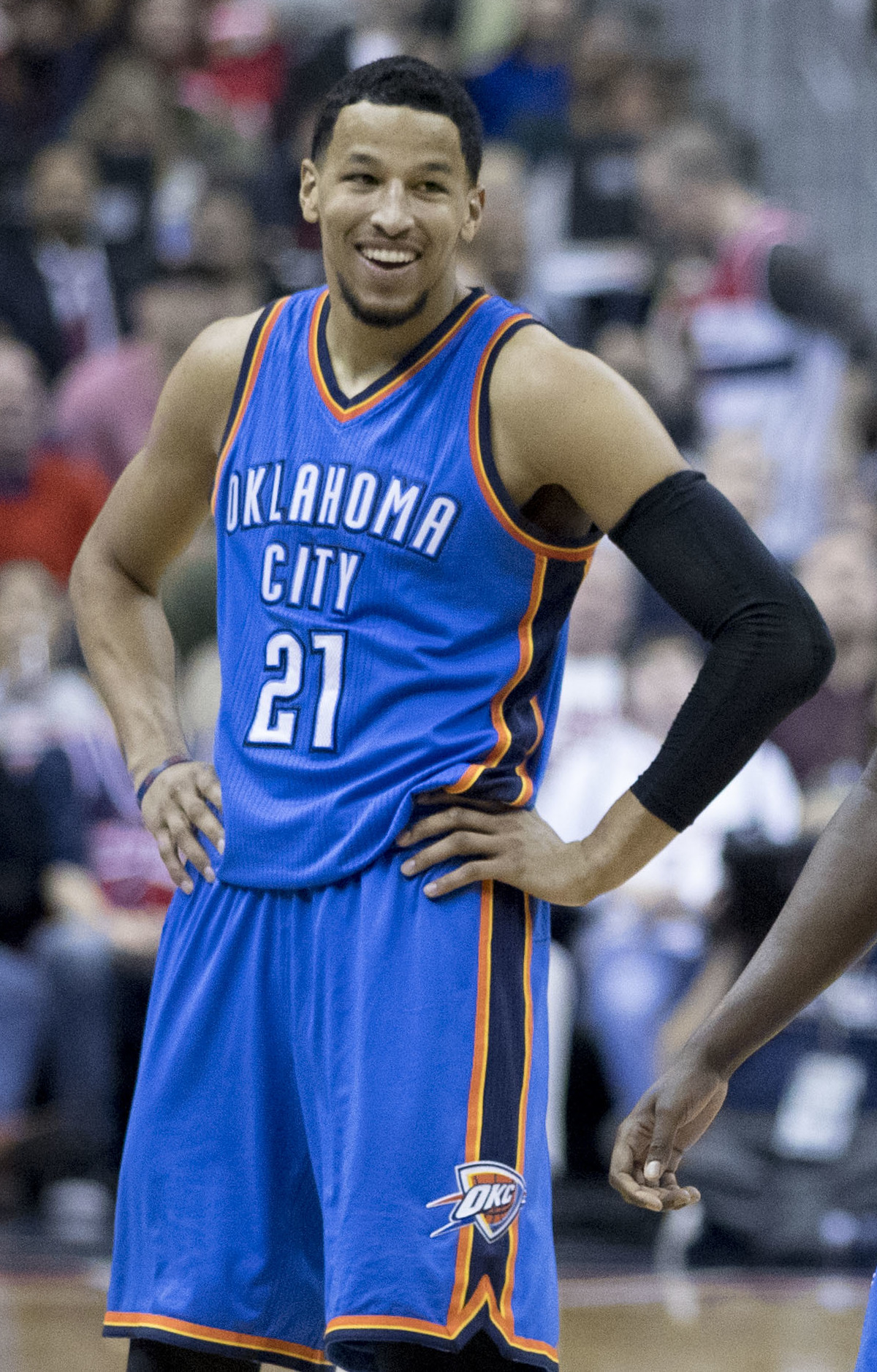
Roberson in 2017

On July 14, 2017, Roberson re-signed with the Thunder to a three-year, $30 million contract. After missing eight games in January 2018 with left patellar tendinitis, he ruptured his left patellar tendon on January 27 against the Detroit Pistons. Roberson underwent surgery the following day and was subsequently ruled out for the rest of the season.

On October 4, 2018, Roberson was ruled out for an additional two months after undergoing a procedure following a setback during his rehab from left knee surgery. In late November, he experienced discomfort after landing from a jump, and an MRI revealed that he had suffered a small avulsion fracture in his knee. Roberson was subsequently ruled out for at least another six weeks.

On August 1, 2020, Roberson played his first NBA game in over two years, logging five minutes in a 110–94 victory over the Utah Jazz.

=== Brooklyn Nets (2021) ===
On February 16, 2021, Roberson signed with the Brooklyn Nets. He played two games for the Nets before being waived on February 23. Three days later, Roberson signed a 10-day contract with the Nets.

=== Oklahoma City Blue (2023) ===
On February 1, 2023, Roberson signed with the Oklahoma City Blue, the Thunder's G League affiliate.

=== Cholet Basket (2024) ===
On September 5, 2024, Roberson signed with Cholet Basket of LNB Pro A.

=== ASVEL (2024–2025) ===
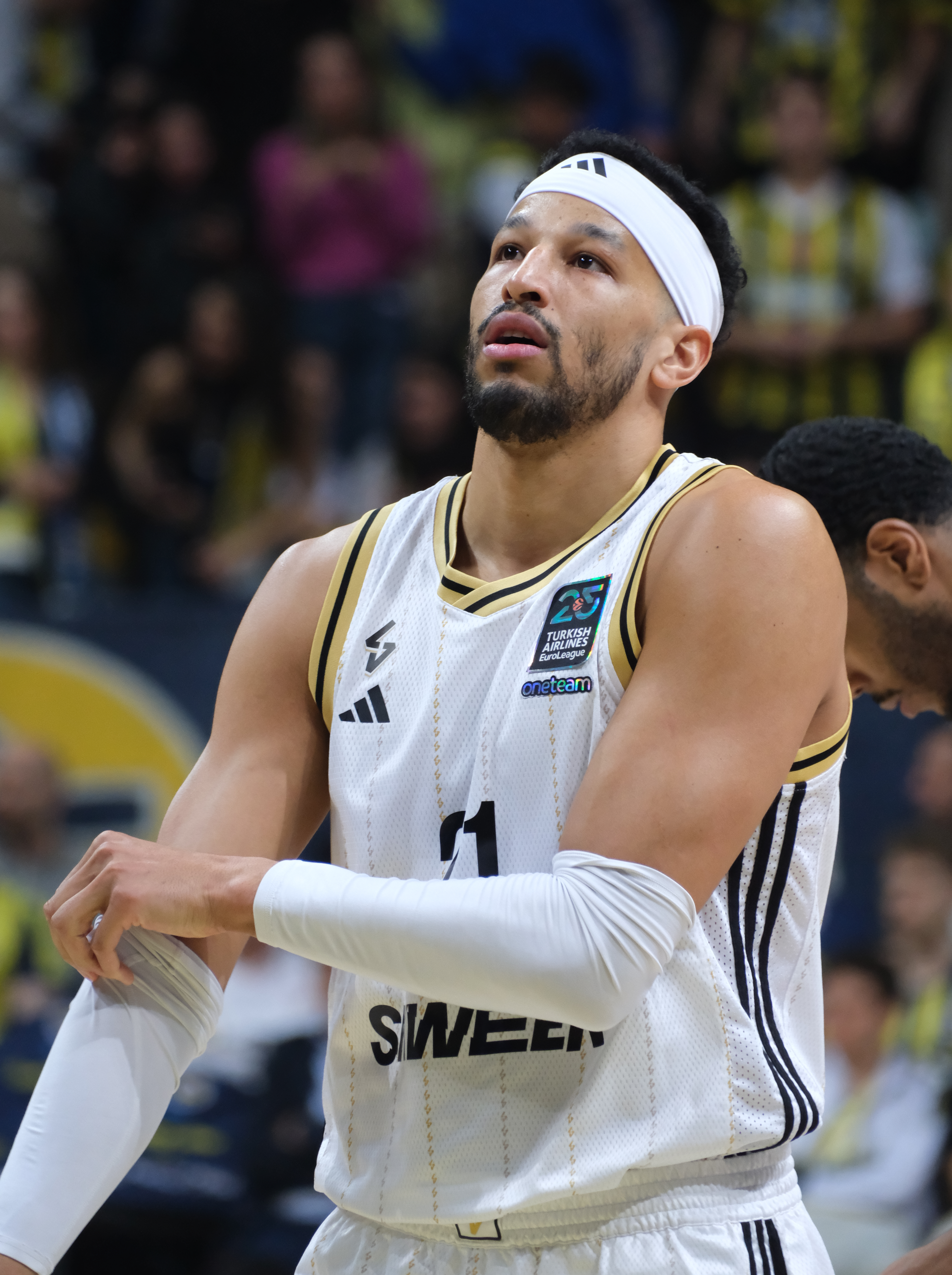
Roberson with ASVEL in 2025

On November 8, 2024, Roberson signed with ASVEL of the LNB Élite (LNB).

=== Zenit St. Petersburg (2025–present) ===
On July 31, 2025, Roberson signed with Zenit Saint Petersburg of the VTB United League. He averaged 9.2 points, 6.8 rebounds, 1.8 assists and 1.2 steals per game. Roberson re-signed with the team on July 11, 2026.

== Career statistics ==
Legend
GP	Games played	GS	Games started	MPG	Minutes per game
FG%	Field goal percentage	3P%	3-point field goal percentage	FT%	Free throw percentage
RPG	Rebounds per game	APG	Assists per game	SPG	Steals per game
BPG	Blocks per game	PPG	Points per game	**Bold**	Career high

=== NBA ===
==== Regular season ====
Year	Team	GP	GS	MPG	FG%	3P%	FT%	RPG	APG	SPG	BPG	PPG
2013–14	Oklahoma City	40	16	10.0	.485	.154	**.700**	2.4	.4	.5	.3	1.9
2014–15	Oklahoma City	67	65	19.2	.458	.247	.479	3.8	1.0	.8	.4	3.4
2015–16	Oklahoma City	70	70	22.2	.496	**.311**	.611	3.6	.7	.8	.6	4.8
2016–17	Oklahoma City	**79**	**79**	**30.1**	.465	.246	.423	**5.1**	1.0	**1.2**	**1.0**	**6.6**
2017–18	Oklahoma City	39	39	26.6	**.537**	.222	.316	4.7	**1.2**	**1.2**	.9	5.0
2019–20	Oklahoma City	7	0	12.4	.276	.214	.500	3.9	.6	.1	.4	2.9
2020–21	Brooklyn	5	0	12.6	.143	.125	.500	3.0	.8	.6	.2	1.2
Career		307	269	22.2	.473	.253	.468	4.0	.9	.9	.6	4.5

==== Playoffs ====
Year	Team	GP	GS	MPG	FG%	3P%	FT%	RPG	APG	SPG	BPG	PPG
2014	Oklahoma City	2	0	4.5	.000	—	—	1.0	.0	.0	.0	.0
2016	Oklahoma City	**18**	**18**	26.2	.465	.324	**.400**	5.6	.8	1.3	1.1	5.6
2017	Oklahoma City	5	5	**37.0**	**.522**	**.412**	.143	**6.2**	**1.8**	**2.4**	**3.4**	**11.6**
2020	Oklahoma City	1	0	3.0	.000	.000	—	.0	.0	.0	.0	.0
Career		26	23	25.7	.471	.345	.268	5.2	.9	1.3	1.4	6.1

=== College ===
Year	Team	GP	GS	MPG	FG%	3P%	FT%	RPG	APG	SPG	BPG	PPG
2010–11	Colorado	**38**	0	22.3	**.580**	.343	.553	7.8	.9	1.3	1.1	6.7
2011–12	Colorado	36	**35**	30.2	.510	**.380**	**.614**	11.1	1.2	1.3	**1.9**	**11.6**
2012–13	Colorado	31	30	**33.4**	.480	.328	.551	**11.2**	**1.4**	**2.2**	1.3	10.9
Career		105	65	28.3	.516	.350	.582	10.0	1.1	1.6	1.4	9.6

== Personal life ==
Roberson comes from a family of athletes. Both of his parents were All-Americans in their respective sports during college at New Mexico State. Roberson has six siblings. All the Roberson children are current or former NCAA Division I athletes.

In August 2025, Roberson married former Old Dominion University women's basketball player and television host, Rachel Annamarie DeMita.
