= 2014–15 Oklahoma City Thunder season =

NBA professional basketball team season

- Head coach: Scott Brooks
- General manager: Sam Presti
- Owners: Professional Basketball Club LLC
- Arena: Chesapeake Energy Arena

Results
- Record: 45–37 (.549)
- Place: Division: 2nd (Northwest); Conference: 9th (Western)
- Playoff finish: Did not qualify
- Stats at Basketball Reference

Local media
- Television: Fox Sports Oklahoma
- Radio: KWPN; WWLS-FM

The 2014–15 Oklahoma City Thunder season was the 7th season of the franchise in Oklahoma City and the 48th in the National Basketball Association (NBA). The Thunder would suffer from injuries, mainly to Kevin Durant, who underwent surgery and was shut down for the rest of the season. Despite this, the Thunder remained in playoff contention, but a four-game losing streak at the beginning of April cost them as they finished 45–37 tied with the New Orleans Pelicans and were eliminated on a head-to-head matchup tie breaker. The Thunder missed the playoffs for the first time since 2009, resulting in Scott Brooks's firing 1 week after the conclusion of the regular season. This was the last time until 2021 that the Thunder missed the playoffs.

== Previous season ==
The Thunder finished the 2013–14 season 59–23 to finish in first place in the Northwest Division, second in the Western Conference and qualified for the playoffs losing to the top-seeded and eventual champion San Antonio Spurs in the Conference Finals in six games. Last season featured Kevin Durant being named the 2014 NBA Most Valuable Player. Durant earned MVP honors after averaging a career-high 32.0 points, 7.4 rebounds, 5.5 assists, and 1.3 steals leading the Thunder to a 59–23 record with Russell Westbrook missing most of the season playing just 46 games.

== Offseason ==
=== Draft picks ===
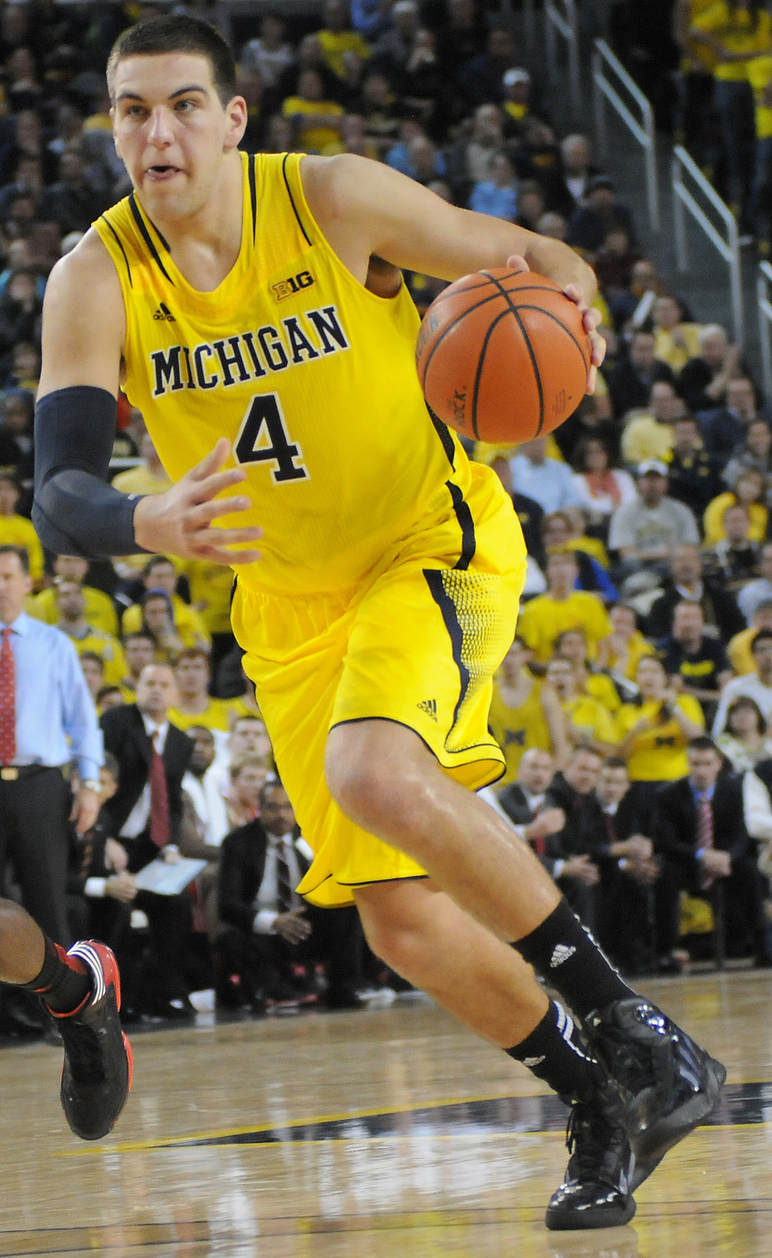
Mitch McGary was selected 21st overall by the Thunder.

Round	Pick	Player	Position	Nationality	College
1	21	Mitch McGary	C	United States	Michigan
1	29	Josh Huestis	SF	United States	Stanford
Semaj Christon was later traded to the Thunder via Charlotte Hornets

The Thunder had two first-round picks entering the draft. The Thunder traded their 2014 second-round pick in the Ronnie Brewer trade from the New York Knicks back in 2013 which was later traded by the Knicks to the Toronto Raptors. The Thunder's other first-round pick was originally acquired from the Houston Rockets as a result of the James Harden trade in 2012.

On draft night, the Thunder traded cash considerations to the Charlotte Hornets in exchange for the draft rights to Semaj Christon, the fifty-fifth pick.

The Thunder ended 2014 NBA draft night with Michigan center Mitch McGary, Stanford forward Josh Huestis and Xavier guard Semaj Christon.

=== Trades ===
On June 27, the Thunder traded cash considerations to the Charlotte Hornets in exchange for the draft rights to Semaj Christon, the fifty-fifth pick.

On July 15, the Thunder signed-and-trade Thabo Sefolosha and the draft rights to Georgios Printezis to the Atlanta Hawks in exchange for the draft rights to Sofoklis Schortsanitis. The Thunder also generated a trade exception worth $4 million. On August 26, the Thunder traded Hasheem Thabeet and cash considerations to the Philadelphia 76ers in exchange for a 2015 protected second-round pick while also generating another trade exception worth $1.25 million.

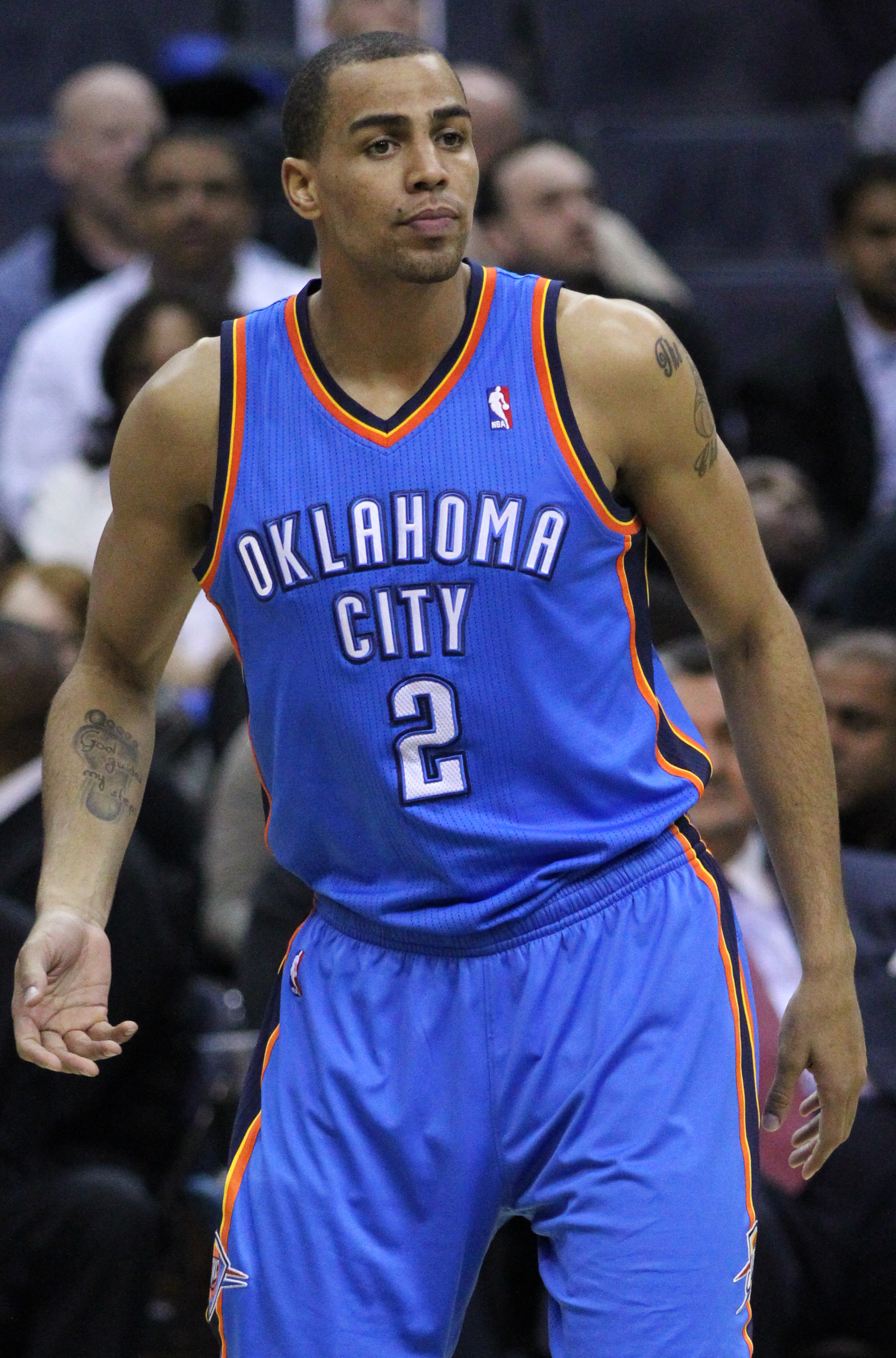
Thabo Sefolosha was signed-and-traded to the Atlanta Hawks after six seasons with the Thunder.

=== Free agency ===
For this offseason, free agency began on July 1, 2014, while the July moratorium ended on July 10. Caron Butler, Derek Fisher and Thabo Sefolosha were set to hit unrestricted free agency while Grant Jerrett was set to hit restricted free agency. Before the start of the 2013-14 season, Fisher announced his plans to retire following the season after 3 seasons with the Thunder. On July 3, it was reported that Thabo Sefolosha agreed to a three-year, $12 million deal with the Atlanta Hawks, which he later signed on July 15. That same day, Caron Butler signed a deal with the Detroit Pistons. On July 16, Grant Jerrett agreed to a deal to stay with the Thunder.

On July 15, Sebastian Telfair signed a deal with the Thunder. Telfair spent nine seasons in the NBA before playing internationally with the Tianjin Ronggang in the CBA. On July 12, it was reported that Anthony Morrow agreed to a three-year, $10 million deal with the Thunder, which he later signed on July 16. Morrow spent the 2013-14 season with the New Orleans Pelicans. On August 14, Lance Thomas signed a deal with the Thunder. Thomas spent three seasons in the NBA, splitting time with the New Orleans Pelicans and the Foshan Dralions in the CBA during the 2013-14 season.

=== Front office and coaching changes ===
On July 5, the Thunder announced Darko Rajaković as an assistant coach. Rajaković joins the Thunder after serving as the head coach of the Tulsa 66ers for the last two seasons.

== Season synopsis ==
=== Regular season ===
On October 12, 2014, Kevin Durant was diagnosed with a fractured right foot after feeling discomfort the day before and was ruled out for 6 to 8 weeks. He went on to miss the first 17 games of the season, and with Russell Westbrook also out for 14 of those 17 games with a fractured hand, the Thunder dropped to a 4–12 record prior to Westbrook's return on November 28 against the New York Knicks. Following Westbrook's return, Durant returned to action the following game on December 2 as he scored 27 points on 9-of-18 shooting in the 104–112 loss to the New Orleans Pelicans. With the duo back to full health, they went on to lead the Thunder on a seven-game winning streak to bring the Thunder back into playoff contention. On December 18, Durant injured his ankle during the second quarter of the streak-breaking 109–114 loss to the Golden State Warriors. Durant scored 30 points on 10-of-13 shooting in the 18 minutes he was on the court before exiting the game with the injury. He subsequently missed the following game the next night against the Los Angeles Lakers. Durant returned on December 31 versus the Phoenix Suns, and played 12 games before spraining the big toe on his left foot versus the Cleveland Cavaliers on January 25. He would play only six more games the rest of the season, having a procedure on February 22 to replace a screw that was causing soreness in his surgically repaired right foot. It was announced on March 21 that the Thunder might be without Durant for the rest of the season. The team then decided to shut down Durant for the remainder of the season after determining that he would need a third surgery on his right foot. Without Durant, the Thunder finished the season just missing the playoffs, missing the 8th seed by tiebreaker to the New Orleans Pelicans.

== Roster ==
2014–15 Oklahoma City Thunder roster
Players

Pos.	No.	Player	Height	Weight	DOB	From
C	12	Steven Adams	6 ft 11 in (2.11 m)	250 lb (113 kg)	1993-07-20	Pittsburgh
PG	14	D. J. Augustin	6 ft 0 in (1.83 m)	183 lb (83 kg)	1987-11-10	Texas
PF	4	Nick Collison	6 ft 10 in (2.08 m)	255 lb (116 kg)	1980-11-26	Kansas
SF	35	Kevin Durant	6 ft 10 in (2.08 m)	240 lb (109 kg)	1988-09-29	Texas
PF	9	Serge Ibaka	7 ft 0 in (2.13 m)	245 lb (111 kg)	1989-09-18	Spain
PF/C	34	Enes Kanter	6 ft 11 in (2.11 m)	247 lb (112 kg)	1992-05-20	Stoneridge PS (CA)
PF	3	Perry Jones	6 ft 11 in (2.11 m)	235 lb (107 kg)	1991–09–24	Baylor
SG	11	Jeremy Lamb	6 ft 5 in (1.96 m)	190 lb (86 kg)	1992-05-30	Connecticut
C	33	Mitch McGary	6 ft 10 in (2.08 m)	255 lb (116 kg)	1992-06-06	Michigan
SG	2	Anthony Morrow	6 ft 5 in (1.96 m)	210 lb (95 kg)	1985-09-27	Georgia Tech
PF	6	Steve Novak	6 ft 10 in (2.08 m)	235 lb (107 kg)	1983-06-13	Marquette
SG	21	André Roberson	6 ft 7 in (2.01 m)	210 lb (95 kg)	1991-12-04	Colorado
SF	5	Kyle Singler	6 ft 8 in (2.03 m)	228 lb (103 kg)	1988-05-04	Duke
SG	23	Dion Waiters	6 ft 4 in (1.93 m)	225 lb (102 kg)	1991-12-10	Syracuse
PG	0	Russell Westbrook	6 ft 3 in (1.91 m)	200 lb (91 kg)	1988-11-12	UCLA

Coaches
Head coach
- Scott Brooks
Assistant(s)
- Mark Bryant
- Rex Kalamian
- Robert Pack
- Darko Rajaković
- Mike Terpstra

Legend
- (DP) Unsigned draft pick
- (FA) Free agent
- (S) Suspended
- (DL) On assignment to D-League affiliate
- Injured

Roster
Updated: February 19, 2015

== Staff ==
Oklahoma City Thunder staff
Front Office: Chairman – Clay Bennett; Executive Vice President & General Manager – Sam Presti; Assistant General Manager – Troy Weaver; Assistant General Manager – Michael Winger; Basketball Operations: Director of Medical Services – Donnie Strack; Director of Basketball Research and Analysis – Jesse Gould	Coaches: Head coach – Scott Brooks; Assistant coach – Mark Bryant; Assistant coach – Rex Kalamian; Assistant coach – Robert Pack; Assistant coach – Darko Rajaković; Assistant coach – Mike Terpstra; Trainer – Joe Sharpe; Broadcasters: Play-by-Play – Brian Davis; Television Analyst – Michael Cage; Broadcast Reporter – Lesley McCaslin; Radio Broadcaster – Matt Pinto; Spanish Radio Broadcaster – Eleno Ornelas; → Staff

== Standings ==
=== Conference ===
Western Conference
#	Team	W	L	PCT	GB	GP
1	z-Golden State Warriors *	67	15	.817	–	82
2	y-Houston Rockets *	56	26	.683	11.0	82
3	x-Los Angeles Clippers	56	26	.683	11.0	82
4	y-Portland Trail Blazers *	51	31	.622	16.0	82
5	x-Memphis Grizzlies	55	27	.671	12.0	82
6	x-San Antonio Spurs	55	27	.671	12.0	82
7	x-Dallas Mavericks	50	32	.610	17.0	82
8	x-New Orleans Pelicans	45	37	.549	22.0	82
9	Oklahoma City Thunder	45	37	.549	22.0	82
10	Phoenix Suns	39	43	.476	28.0	82
11	Utah Jazz	38	44	.463	29.0	82
12	Denver Nuggets	30	52	.366	37.0	82
13	Sacramento Kings	29	53	.354	38.0	82
14	Los Angeles Lakers	21	61	.256	46.0	82
15	Minnesota Timberwolves	16	66	.195	51.0	82

=== Division ===
Northwest Division	W	L	PCT	GB	Home	Road	Div	GP
y-Portland Trail Blazers	51	31	.622	–	32‍–‍9	19‍–‍22	11–5	82
Oklahoma City Thunder	45	37	.549	6.0	29‍–‍12	16‍–‍25	10–6	82
Utah Jazz	38	44	.463	13.0	21‍–‍20	17‍–‍24	9–7	82
Denver Nuggets	30	52	.366	21.0	19‍–‍22	11‍–‍30	6–10	82
Minnesota Timberwolves	16	66	.195	35.0	9‍–‍32	7‍–‍34	4–12	82

== Game log ==
=== Preseason ===
2014 preseason game log
Total: 2–5 (Home: 1–3; Road: 1–2)
Preseason: 2–5 (home: 1–3; road: 1–2)

Game	Date	Team	Score	High points	High rebounds	High assists	Location Attendance	Record
1	October 8	@ Denver	L 101–114	Steven Adams (15)	Adams, Roberson & Zanna (7)	Reggie Jackson (6)	Pepsi Center; 12,081	0–1
2	October 10	@Dallas	W 118–109	Anthony Morrow (21)	Jeremy Lamb (11)	Michael Jenkins (5)	American Airlines Center; 18,397	1–1
3	October 14	Memphis	W 117–107	Jeremy Lamb (23)	Thomas, Adams & Lamb (6)	Russell Westbrook (12)	Chesapeake Energy Arena; N/A	2–1
4	October 16	@New Orleans	L 86–120	Jeremy Lamb (20)	Steven Adams (8)	Telfair & Roberson (3)	Smoothie King Center; 12,202	2–2
5	October 17	Toronto	L 90–109	Russell Westbrook (16)	Andre Roberson (10)	Russell Westbrook (8)	Intrust Bank Arena; 13,161	2–3
6	October 19	Minnesota	L 94–112	Perry Jones (21)	Jones & Thomas (8)	Adams, Jenkins & Talfair (3)	BOK Center; 16,901	2–4
7	October 21	Utah	L 91–105	Perry Jones (20)	Steven Adams (8)	Russell Westbrook (11)	Chesapeake Energy Arena; N/A	2–5

2014–15 season schedule

=== Regular season ===
2014–15 game log
Total: 45–37 (Home: 29–12 Road: 16–25)
October: 0–2 (home: 0–0; road: 0–2)

Game	Date	Team	Score	High points	High rebounds	High assists	Location Attendance	Record
1	October 29	@ Portland	L 89–106	Russell Westbrook (38)	Ibaka & Perkins (8)	Russell Westbrook (6)	Moda Center; 19,411	0–1
2	October 30	@ L.A.Clippers	L 90–93	Perry Jones (32)	Steven Adams (7)	Sebastian Telfair (7)	Staples Center; 19,060	0–2

November : 5–10 (home: 4–5; road: 1–5)

Game	Date	Team	Score	High points	High rebounds	High assists	Location Attendance	Record
3	November 1	Denver	W 102–91	Jones & Ibaka (23)	Roberson & Thomas (8)	Sebastian Telfair (9)	Chesapeake Energy Arena; 18,203	1–2
4	November 3	@ Brooklyn	L 85–116	Reggie Jackson (23)	Ibaka & Adams (9)	Sebastian Telfair (6)	Barclays Center; 17,732	1–3
5	November 4	@ Toronto	L 88–100	Serge Ibaka (25)	Serge Ibaka (11)	Reggie Jackson (14)	Air Canada Centre; 18,877	1–4
6	November 7	Memphis	L 89–91	Reggie Jackson (22)	Steven Adams (11)	Reggie Jackson (8)	Chesapeake Energy Arena; 18,203	1–5
7	November 9	Sacramento	W 101–93	Reggie Jackson (22)	Ibaka & Lamb (9)	Reggie Jackson (6)	Chesapeake Energy Arena; 18,203	2–5
8	November 11	@ Milwaukee	L 78–85	Reggie Jackson (29)	Steven Adams (10)	Reggie Jackson (4)	BMO Harris Bradley Center; 12,390	2–6
9	November 12	@ Boston	W 109–94	Jackson & Morrow (28)	Lance Thomas (13)	Reggie Jackson (8)	TD Garden; 17,043	3–6
10	November 14	Detroit	L 89–96 (OT)	Jeremy Lamb (24)	Ibaka & Lamb (10)	Reggie Jackson (12)	Chesapeake Energy Arena; 18,203	3–7
11	November 16	Houston	L 65–69	Thomas & Jackson (15)	Reggie Jackson (11)	Reggie Jackson (4)	Chesapeake Energy Arena; 18,203	3–8
12	November 18	@ Utah	L 81–98	Jeremy Lamb (19)	Thomas & Adams (8)	Reggie Jackson (7)	Energy Solutions Arena; 17,190	3–9
13	November 19	@ Denver	L 100–107	Serge Ibaka (22)	Serge Ibaka (13)	Reggie Jackson (9)	Pepsi Center; 14,140	3–10
14	November 21	Brooklyn	L 92–94	Reggie Jackson (21)	Serge Ibaka (10)	Reggie Jackson (8)	Chesapeake Energy Arena; 18,203	3–11
15	November 23	Golden State	L 86–91	Reggie Jackson (22)	Anthony Morrow (12)	Reggie Jackson (8)	Chesapeake Energy Arena; 18,203	3–12
16	November 26	Utah	W 97–82	Reggie Jackson (22)	Steven Adams (11)	Reggie Jackson (8)	Chesapeake Energy Arena; 18,203	4–12
17	November 28	New York	W 105–78	Russell Westbrook (32)	Steven Adams (13)	Russell Westbrook (8)	Chesapeake Energy Arena; 18,203	5–12

December: 11–5 (home: 5–2; road: 6–3)

Game	Date	Team	Score	High points	High rebounds	High assists	Location Attendance	Record
18	December 2	@ New Orleans	L 104–112	Kevin Durant (27)	Andre Roberson (9)	Russell Westbrook (7)	Smoothie King Center; 13,903	5–13
19	December 5	@ Philadelphia	W 103–91	Russell Westbrook (27)	Kendrick Perkins (9)	Russell Westbrook (7)	Wells Fargo Center; 15,092	6–13
20	December 7	@ Detroit	W 96–94	Kevin Durant (28)	Serge Ibaka (13)	Russell Westbrook (7)	Palace of Auburn Hills; 13,090	7–13
21	December 9	Milwaukee	W 114–101	Russell Westbrook (28)	Durant & Perkins (9)	Durant & Westbrook (7)	Chesapeake Energy Arena; 18,203	8–13
22	December 11	Cleveland	W 103–94	Russell Westbrook (26)	Steven Adams (10)	Russell Westbrook (8)	Chesapeake Energy Arena; 18,203	9–13
23	December 12	@ Minnesota	W 111–92	Russell Westbrook (34)	Steven Adams (11)	Russell Westbrook (6)	Target Center; 13,557	10–13
24	December 14	Phoenix	W 112–88	Russell Westbrook (28)	Kendrick Perkins (10)	Russell Westbrook (8)	Chesapeake Energy Arena; 18,203	11–13
25	December 16	@ Sacramento	W 104–92	Russell Westbrook (32)	Steven Adams (10)	Russell Westbrook (7)	Sleep Train Arena; 17,317	12–13
26	December 18	@ Golden State	L 109–114	Russell Westbrook (33)	Andre Roberson (12)	Russell Westbrook (8)	Oracle Arena; 19,596	12–14
27	December 19	@ L.A.Lakers	W 104–103	Russell Westbrook (31)	Steven Adams (10)	Russell Westbrook (10)	Staples Center; 18,997	13–14
28	December 21	New Orleans	L 99–101	Russell Westbrook (29)	Steven Adams (10)	Russell Westbrook (8)	Chesapeake Energy Arena; 18,203	13–15
29	December 23	Portland	L 111–115 (OT)	Russell Westbrook (40)	Steven Adams (11)	Russell Westbrook (6)	Chesapeake Energy Arena; 18,203	13–16
30	December 25	@ San Antonio	W 114–106	Russell Westbrook (34)	Steven Adams (15)	Russell Westbrook (11)	AT&T Center; 18,581	14–16
31	December 26	Charlotte	W 98–75	Russell Westbrook (29)	Serge Ibaka (14)	Russell Westbrook (5)	Chesapeake Energy Arena; 18,203	15–16
32	December 28	@ Dallas	L 107–112	Serge Ibaka (26)	Serge Ibaka (10)	Russell Westbrook (9)	American Airlines Center; 20,417	15–17
33	December 31	Phoenix	W 137–134 (OT)	Kevin Durant (44)	Kevin Durant (10)	Kevin Durant (7)	Chesapeake Energy Arena; 18,203	16–17

January: 7–7 (home: 4–0; road: 3–7)

Game	Date	Team	Score	High points	High rebounds	High assists	Location Attendance	Record
34	January 2	Washington	W 109–102	Kevin Durant (34)	Kevin Durant (8)	Reggie Jackson (8)	Chesapeake Energy Arena; 18,203	17–17
35	January 5	@ Golden State	L 91–117	Russell Westbrook (22)	Durant & Morrow(10)	Russell Westbrook (5)	Oracle Arena; 19,596	17–18
36	January 7	@ Sacramento	L 83–104	Kevin Durant (24)	Serge Ibaka (10)	Westbrook & Jackson (4)	Sleep Train Arena; 16,037	17–19
37	January 9	Utah	W 99–94	Kevin Durant (32)	Ibaka & Perkins (7)	Russell Westbrook (12)	Chesapeake Energy Arena; 18,203	18–19
38	January 15	@ Houston	L 101–112	Kevin Durant (24)	Kevin Durant (10)	Russell Westbrook (8)	Toyota Center; 18,315	18–20
39	January 16	Golden State	W 127–115	Kevin Durant (36)	Russell Westbrook (15)	Russell Westbrook (17)	Chesapeake Energy Arena; 18,203	19–20
40	January 18	@ Orlando	W 127–99	Kevin Durant (21)	Kevin Durant (11)	Kevin Durant (8)	Amway Center; 16,128	20–20
41	January 20	@ Miami	W 94–86	Durant & Westbrook (19)	Russell Westbrook (10)	Kevin Durant (8)	American Airlines Arena; 19,735	21–20
42	January 21	@ Washington	W 105–103 (OT)	Kevin Durant (34)	Steven Adams (20)	Russell Westbrook (8)	Verizon Center; 20,356	22–20
43	January 23	@ Atlanta	L 93–103	Russell Westbrook (22)	Serge Ibaka (10)	Russell Westbrook (11)	Philips Arena; 19,203	22–21
44	January 25	@ Cleveland	L 98–108	Kevin Durant (32)	Serge Ibaka (10)	Russell Westbrook (11)	Quicken Loans Arena; 20,562	22–22
45	January 26	Minnesota	W 92–84	Russell Westbrook (18)	Serge Ibaka (19)	Westbrook & Waiters (5)	Chesapeake Energy Arena; 18,203	23–22
46	January 28	@ New York	L 92–100	Russell Westbrook (40)	Serge Ibaka (10)	Westbrook & Jackson (4)	Madison Square Garden; 19,812	23–23
47	January 31	@ Memphis	L 74–85	Kevin Durant (15)	Serge Ibaka (10)	Russell Westbrook (5)	FedEx Forum; 18,119	23–24

February : 9–3 (home: 6–1; road: 3–2)

Game	Date	Team	Score	High points	High rebounds	High assists	Location Attendance	Record
48	February 2	Orlando	W 104–97	Russell Westbrook (25)	Russell Westbrook (11)	Russell Westbrook (14)	Chesapeake Energy Arena; 18,203	24–24
49	February 4	@ New Orleans	W 102–91	Russell Westbrook (45)	Steven Adams (9)	Russell Westbrook (6)	Smoothie King Center; 17,156	25–24
50	February 6	New Orleans	L 113–116	Russell Westbrook (48)	Russell Westbrook (9)	Russell Westbrook (11)	Chesapeake Energy Arena; 18,203	25–25
51	February 8	L.A.Clippers	W 131–108	Kevin Durant (29)	Russell Westbrook (11)	Durant & Jackson (6)	Chesapeake Energy Arena; 18,203	26–25
52	February 9	@ Denver	W 124–114	Kevin Durant (40)	Mitch McGary (10)	Russell Westbrook (9)	Pepsi Center; 16,511	27–25
53	February 11	Memphis	W 105–89	Kevin Durant (26)	Kevin Durant (10)	Russell Westbrook (9)	Chesapeake Energy Arena; 18,203	28–25
All-Star Break
54	February 19	Dallas	W 104–89	Russell Westbrook (34)	Serge Ibaka (22)	Russell Westbrook (10)	Chesapeake Energy Arena; 18,203	29–25
55	February 21	@ Charlotte	W 110–103	Russell Westbrook (33)	Enes Kanter (13)	Russell Westbrook (10)	Time Warner Cable Arena; 19,303	30–25
56	February 22	Denver	W 119–94	Russell Westbrook (21)	Enes Kanter (12)	Russell Westbrook (17)	Chesapeake Energy Arena; 18,203	31–25
57	February 24	Indiana	W 105–92	Serge Ibaka (23)	Russell Westbrook (11)	Russell Westbrook (10)	Chesapeake Energy Arena; 18,203	32–25
58	February 26	@ Phoenix	L 113–117 (OT)	Russell Westbrook (39)	Russell Westbrook (13)	Russell Westbrook (11)	US Airways Center; 17,514	32–26
59	February 27	@ Portland	L 112–115	Russell Westbrook (40)	Russell Westbrook (13)	Russell Westbrook (11)	Moda Center; 19,962	32–27

March : 10–5 (home: 8–1; road: 2–4)

Game	Date	Team	Score	High points	High rebounds	High assists	Location Attendance	Record
60	March 1	@ L.A. Lakers	W 108–101	Ibaka & Augustin (18)	Enes Kanter (15)	Kanter & Augustin (5)	Staples Center; 18,997	33–27
61	March 4	Philadelphia	W 123–118 (OT)	Russell Westbrook (49)	Russell Westbrook (16)	Russell Westbrook (10)	Chesapeake Energy Arena; 18,203	34–27
62	March 5	@ Chicago	L 105–108	Russell Westbrook (43)	Serge Ibaka (9)	Russell Westbrook (7)	United Center; 21,696	34–28
63	March 8	Toronto	W 108–104	Russell Westbrook (30)	Enes Kanter (12)	Russell Westbrook (17)	Chesapeake Energy Arena; 18,203	35–28
64	March 11	L.A. Clippers	L 108–120	Anthony Morrow (26)	Russell Westbrook (9)	Russell Westbrook (7)	Chesapeake Energy Arena; 18,203	35–29
65	March 13	Minnesota	W 113–99	Russell Westbrook (29)	Enes Kanter (15)	Russell Westbrook (12)	Chesapeake Energy Arena; 18,203	36–29
66	March 15	Chicago	W 109–100	Russell Westbrook (36)	Enes Kanter (18)	Russell Westbrook (6)	Chesapeake Energy Arena; 18,203	37–29
67	March 16	@ Dallas	L 115–119	Russell Westbrook (24)	Kanter & McGary (13)	Russell Westbrook (12)	American Airlines Center; 20,231	37–30
68	March 18	Boston	W 122–118	Russell Westbrook (36)	Steven Adams (13)	Russell Westbrook (10)	Chesapeake Energy Arena; 18,203	38–30
69	March 20	Atlanta	W 123–115	Russell Westbrook (36)	Steven Adams (16)	Russell Westbrook (14)	Chesapeake Energy Arena; 18,203	39–30
70	March 22	Miami	W 93–75	Enes Kanter (27)	Enes Kanter (12)	Russell Westbrook (17)	Chesapeake Energy Arena; 18,203	40–30
71	March 24	L.A. Lakers	W 127–117	Russell Westbrook (27)	Enes Kanter (16)	Russell Westbrook (11)	Chesapeake Energy Arena; 18,203	41–30
72	March 25	@ San Antonio	L 91–130	Kanter, Westbrook (16)	Enes Kanter (10)	Russell Westbrook (7)	AT&T Center; 18,581	41–31
73	March 28	@ Utah	L 89–94	Russell Westbrook (37)	Steven Adams (14)	Russell Westbrook (6)	Energy Solutions Arena; 19,911	41–32
74	March 29	@ Phoenix	W 109–97	Russell Westbrook (33)	Steven Adams (16)	Russell Westbrook (7)	US Airways Center; 17,538	42–32

April: 3–5 (home: 2–3; road: 1–2)

Game	Date	Team	Score	High points	High rebounds	High assists	Location Attendance	Record
75	April 1	Dallas	L 131–135	Anthony Morrow (32)	Enes Kanter (16)	Russell Westbrook (10)	Chesapeake Energy Arena; 18,203	42–33
76	April 3	@ Memphis	L 92–100	Enes Kanter (24)	Enes Kanter (17)	Russell Westbrook (7)	FedExForum; 18,119	42–34
77	April 5	Houston	L 112–115	Russell Westbrook (40)	Enes Kanter (17)	Russell Westbrook (13)	Chesapeake Energy Arena; 18,203	42–35
78	April 7	San Antonio	L 88–113	Russell Westbrook (17)	Mitch McGary (9)	DJ Augustin (4)	Chesapeake Energy Arena; 18,203	42–36
79	April 10	Sacramento	W 116–103	Russell Westbrook (27)	Steven Adams (11)	Russell Westbrook (10)	Chesapeake Energy Arena; 18,203	43–36
80	April 12	@ Indiana	L 104–116	Russell Westbrook (54)	Steven Adams (10)	Russell Westbrook (8)	Bankers Life Fieldhouse; 18,165	43–37
81	April 13	Portland	W 101–90	Russell Westbrook (36)	Enes Kanter (13)	Russell Westbrook (7)	Chesapeake Energy Arena; 18,203	44–37
82	April 15	@ Minnesota	W 138–113	Russell Westbrook (37)	Enes Kanter (15)	Russell Westbrook (7)	Target Center; 18,250	45–37

2014–15 season schedule

== Player statistics ==
Legend
GP	Games played	GS	Games started	MPG	Minutes per game
FG%	Field goal percentage	3P%	3-point field goal percentage	FT%	Free throw percentage
RPG	Rebounds per game	APG	Assists per game	SPG	Steals per game
BPG	Blocks per game	PPG	Points per game	**Bold**	Career high

Summer league and preseason statistics

Legend
GP	Games played	GS	Games started	MPG	Minutes per game
FG%	Field-goal percentage	3P%	3-point field-goal percentage	FT%	Free-throw percentage
RPG	Rebounds per game	APG	Assists per game	SPG	Steals per game
BPG	Blocks per game	PPG	Points per game

=== Summer league ===
Oklahoma City Thunder statistics
Player	GP	GS	MPG	FG%	3P%	FT%	RPG	APG	SPG	BPG	PPG
Marcus Lewis	5	0	12.2	.750	.	.	1.2	1.6	1.2	0.0	3.8
Semaj Christon	4	4	26.3	.485	.	.	2.3	2.8	1.3	0.0	11.3
Ron Anderson	5	5	9.6	.000	.	.	2.8	0.6	0.2	0.0	0.8
Mario Little	4	0	19.0	.357	.	.	2.3	3.0	1.3	0.0	10.0
Steven Adams	3	0	9.7	.600	.	.	4.7	0.7	0.3	1.0	9.7
Andre Roberson	4	3	29.0	.483	.	.	8.3	2.0	2.3	0.8	9.5
Josh Huestis	4	0	19.8	.429	.	.	2.3	1.0	0.3	0.5	8.0
Fuquan Edwin	3	0	7.3	.250	.	.	0.3	0.0	1.0	0.0	1.3
Mitch McGary	4	4	26.0	.500	.	.	5.8	1.3	0.8	1.8	14.8
Perry Jones	4	4	27.3	.447	.	.	5.3	0.5	0.8	1.0	12.3
Jeremy Lamb	3	3	31.3	.320	.	.	5.3	2.7	1.3	0.7	17.3
Maurice Sutton	3	0	3.7	.333	.	.	1.0	0.0	0.0	0.0	1.7
Michael Stockton	3	0	10.0	.600	.	.	0.7	2.7	1.0	0.0	3.0

=== Preseason ===
Oklahoma City Thunder statistics
Player	GP	GS	MPG	FG%	3P%	FT%	RPG	APG	SPG	BPG	PPG
Russell Westbrook	6	5	22.3	.369	.100	.920	6.2	4.2	1.8	0.0	12.0
Kevin Durant	2	2	15.0	.500	.333	1.000	2.5	2.5	1.5	0.0	11.5
Serge Ibaka	3	3	23.9	.469	.500	.500	5.7	0.7	0.0	1.7	11.3
Reggie Jackson	2	0	20.1	.412	.429	1.000	2.5	4.5	0.5	0.0	11.0
Steven Adams	7	7	25.7	.684	.000	.500	6.9	1.0	1.1	1.3	12.7
Anthony Morrow	6	3	24.9	.475	.448	.950	2.0	1.3	0.3	0.2	15.0
Lance Thomas	6	2	22.2	.333	.000	.917	4.5	0.2	0.3	0.3	4.8
Sebastian Telfair	5	1	22.9	.261	.222	.100	2.0	3.0	0.3	0.7	4.
Andre Roberson	7	3	28.0	.441	.400	.467	6.1	2.3	1.1	0.9	5.6
Richard Soloman	3	0	11.9	.667	.000	.500	3.3	0.3	1.3	0.7	4.7
Nick Collison	1	0	11.1	1.000	1.000	.000	0.0	1.0	0.0	1.0	5.0
Mitch McGary	1	1	36.0	.500	.000	.000	2.0	4.0	2.0	0.0	14.0
Perry Jones	6	1	23.7	.410	.286	.483	3.5	0.5	0.2	0.5	11.7
Jeremy Lamb	5	1	32.4	.304	.143	.771	5.6	2.6	1.2	0.8	15.8
Talib Zanna	7	0	17.4	.400	.000	.682	5.0	0.3	0.4	0.4	4.4
Michael Jenkins	7	0	17.5	.400	.320	.600	1.7	2.0	0.4	0.0	6.0

=== Regular season ===
Oklahoma City Thunder statistics
Player	GP	GS	MPG	FG%	3P%	FT%	RPG	APG	SPG	BPG	PPG
Steven Adams	70	67	25.3	54.4%	0.0%	50.2%	7.5	0.9	0.5	1.2	7.7
D. J. Augustin ^{≠}	28	1	24.2	37.1%	35.4%	86.1%	2.2	3.1	0.6	0.0	7.3
Nick Collison	66	2	16.7	41.9%	26.7%	69.2%	3.8	1.4	0.5	0.4	4.1
Kevin Durant	27	27	33.8	51.0%	40.3%	85.4%	6.6	4.1	0.9	0.9	25.4
Enes Kanter ^{≠}	26	26	31.1	56.6%	75.0%	77.6%	11.0	1.1	0.5	0.5	18.7
Serge Ibaka	64	64	33.1	47.6%	37.6%	83.6%	7.8	0.9	0.5	2.4	14.3
Reggie Jackson ^{†}	50	13	28.0	43.2%	27.8%	86.1%	4.0	4.3	0.8	0.1	12.8
Grant Jerrett	5	0	5.0	17.6%	7.7%	-	0.8	0.2	0.0	0.4	1.4
Perry Jones	43	13	14.7	39.7%	23.3%	64.9%	1.8	0.4	0.4	0.2	4.3
Jeremy Lamb	47	8	13.5	41.6%	34.2%	89.1%	2.3	0.9	0.4	0.1	6.3
Mitch McGary	32	2	15.2	53.3%	0.0%	62.5%	5.2	0.4	0.5	0.5	6.3
Anthony Morrow	74	0	24.4	46.3%	43.4%	88.8%	2.6	0.8	0.7	0.1	10.7
Steve Novak ^{≠}	13	0	6.8	28.6%	20.0%	-	0.5	0.4	0.0	0.1	1.2
Kendrick Perkins ^{†}	51	3	19.2	44.1%	0.0%	50.7%	5.5	0.8	0.3	0.7	4.0
Andre Roberson	67	65	19.2	45.8%	24.7%	47.9%	3.8	1.0	0.8	0.4	3.4
Kyle Singler ^{≠}	26	18	17.5	33.3%	37.0%	68.8%	2.1	0.7	0.5	0.3	3.7
Ish Smith ^{≠} ^{†}	30	0	5.2	33.3%	20.0%	66.7%	0.9	0.9	0.1	0.0	1.2
Sebastian Telfair ^{‡}	16	1	20.4	36.8%	30.0%	70.6%	1.9	2.8	0.6	0.0	8.4
Lance Thomas ^{†}	22	13	20.5	35.7%	0.0%	69.7%	3.4	0.9	0.5	0.0	5.1
Dion Waiters ^{≠}	47	20	30.3	39.2%	31.9%	62.5%	2.9	1.9	1.0	0.2	12.7
Russell Westbrook	67	67	34.4	42.6%	29.9%	83.5%	7.3	8.6	2.1	0.2	28.1

Led team in statistic

After all games.
^{‡} Waived during the season
^{†} Traded during the season
^{≠} Acquired during the season

=== Individual game highs ===
Category	Player	Statistic
Points	Russell Westbrook	54 vs Pacers on April 12, 2015
Rebounds	Serge Ibaka	22 vs Mavericks on February 19, 2015
Assists	Russell Westbrook; Russell Westbrook; Russell Westbrook	17 vs Nuggets on February 22, 2015; 17 vs Raptors on March 8, 2015; 17 vs Heat on March 22, 2015
Steals	Russell Westbrook	6 vs Spurs on April 7, 2015
Blocks	Serge Ibaka; Serge Ibaka	8 vs Kings on January 7, 2015; 8 vs Nuggets on February 22, 2015
Minutes	Serge Ibaka	45:58 vs Raptors on November 4, 2014

Category	Player	Statistic
Field goals made	Russell Westbrook	21 vs Pacers on April 12, 2015
Threes made	Kevin Durant	7 vs Nuggets on February 9, 2015
Free throws made	Russell Westbrook	19 vs Celtics on March 18, 2015
Double-Doubles	Russell Westbrook	31
Triple-Doubles	Russell Westbrook	11

== Awards and records ==
=== Awards ===
Player	Award	Date awarded	Ref.
Russell Westbrook	All-NBA Second Team	May 21, 2015	
Russell Westbrook	NBA All-Star Game Most Valuable Player Award	February 15, 2015	
Russell Westbrook	Season scoring leader	April 16, 2015	

== Injuries ==
Player	Duration		Injury type	Games missed
Player	Start	End	Injury type	Games missed
Kevin Durant	October 28, 2014	December 7, 2014	Jones fracture	19
Russell Westbrook	October 31, 2014	November 28, 2014	Broken right hand	14
Kevin Durant	December 19, 2014	December 31, 2014	Sprained right ankle	6
Steven Adams	January 24, 2015	January 26, 2015	Migraine	1
Kevin Durant	January 26, 2015	February 6, 2015	Sprained toe	6
Steven Adams	February 9, 2015	March 8, 2015	Broken right hand	8
Kevin Durant	February 21, 2015	April 26, 2015	Sore right foot	24

== Transactions ==
=== Overview ===
Players Added

Via draft

- Mitch McGary

Via free agency

- Anthony Morrow
- Sebastian Telfair
- Lance Thomas
Players Lost

Via trade

- Hasheem Thabeet

Via free agency

- Caron Butler
- Thabo Sefolosha

Via retirement

- Derek Fisher

=== Trades ===
June 27, 2014	To Oklahoma City Thunder Draft rights to Semaj Christon	To Charlotte Hornets Cash considerations
July 15, 2014	To Oklahoma City Thunder Draft rights to Sofoklis Schortsanitis	To Atlanta Hawks Thabo Sefolosha; Draft rights to Georgios Printezis; Cash considerations
August 26, 2014	To Oklahoma City Thunder 2015 protected second-round pick	To Philadelphia 76ers Hasheem Thabeet; Cash considerations
January 5, 2015	To Oklahoma City Thunder Dion Waiters via CLE	To Cleveland Cavaliers Iman Shumpert via NYK; J.R. Smith via NYK; 2016 first-round pick via OKC
January 5, 2015	To New York Knicks Lou Amundson via CLE; Alex Kirk via CLE; Lance Thomas via OKC; 2019 second-round pick via CLE
February 19, 2015	To Oklahoma City Thunder 2016 second-round pick	To New Orleans Pelicans Ish Smith; Draft rights to Latavious Williams; 2015 second-round pick Cash considerations
February 19, 2015	To Oklahoma City Thunder D. J. Augustin via DET; Enes Kanter via UTA; Steve Novak via UTA; Kyle Singler via DET; 2019 second-round pick via DET	To Detroit Pistons Reggie Jackson via OKC
February 19, 2015	To Utah Jazz Grant Jerrett via OKC; Kendrick Perkins via OKC; 2017 second-round pick via DET; 2017 protected first-round pick via OKC; Draft rights to Tibor Pleiss via OKC

=== Free agency ===
==== Re-signed ====
Date	Player	Contract
July 16, 2014	Grant Jerrett	Standard
In-Season Re-Signings
February 3, 2015	Nick Collison	Multi-Year Extension

==== Additions ====
Date	Player	Contract	Former team
July 15, 2014	Sebastian Telfair	Standard	(China) Tianjin Ronggang
July 16, 2014	Anthony Morrow	Multi-Year	New Orleans Pelicans
August 14, 2014	Lance Thomas	Standard	(China) Foshan Dralions
In-Season Additions
November 7, 2014	Ish Smith	Hardship Exception	Phoenix Suns

==== Subtractions ====
Date	Player	Reason left	New team
July 1, 2014	Derek Fisher	Retired	N/A
July 15, 2014	Thabo Sefolosha	Free Agent	Atlanta Hawks
July 15, 2014	Caron Butler	Free Agent	Detroit Pistons
In-Season Subtractions
November 26, 2014	Sebastian Telfair	Waived	(China) Xinjiang Flying Tigers
