= 2017–18 Oklahoma City Thunder season =

NBA professional basketball team season

- Head coach: Billy Donovan
- General manager: Sam Presti
- Owners: Professional Basketball Club LLC
- Arena: Chesapeake Energy Arena

Results
- Record: 48–34 (.585)
- Place: Division: 2nd (Northwest); Conference: 4th (Western)
- Playoff finish: First Round (lost to Jazz 2–4)
- Stats at Basketball Reference

Local media
- Television: Fox Sports Oklahoma
- Radio: KWPN; WWLS-FM

The 2017–18 Oklahoma City Thunder season was the 10th season of the franchise in Oklahoma City and the 52nd in the National Basketball Association (NBA). This season was headlined by the acquisitions of All-Star players Paul George and Carmelo Anthony in trades with the Indiana Pacers and New York Knicks respectively, in addition to the reigning MVP Russell Westbrook signing a five-year extension worth $205 million. The trio was dubbed the "Big Three" as well as "OK3". The Thunder clinched their playoff berth for the eighth time in the last nine seasons with a win over the Miami Heat in a rematch of the 2012 Finals on April 9, 2018.

They finished the regular season with 48–34, which clinched the 4th seed. In the playoffs, the Thunder faced the 5th seeded Utah Jazz in the First Round, a team led by rookie Donovan Mitchell, and lost in six games.

After averaging a then-career low 16.2 points per game during the season, Anthony was traded to the Atlanta Hawks in the offseason, ending the Thunder's Big Three experiment. The season also marked the end of long-time veteran Nick Collison's career, after 14 years. Sometimes referred to as "Mr. Thunder", Collison appeared once in the finals (2012), and following his retirement, became the only player from the 2003 draft to play their entire career with the team that drafted them, and it also left Jeff Green of the Cleveland Cavaliers and Kevin Durant of the Golden State Warriors as the last remaining active players who played for the then-Seattle SuperSonics, with Mark Bryant and Sam Presti being the last remaining staff members that have been with the Thunder since the Sonics' final season in 2007–08.

== Previous season ==
The Thunder finished the 2016–17 season 47–35 to finish in second place in the Northwest Division, sixth in the Western Conference and qualified for the playoffs. Last season featured Russell Westbrook breaking Oscar Robertson's record for most triple doubles in a season with 42. Westbrook was later named the 2016-17 NBA Most Valuable Player. Westbrook earned MVP honors after joining Oscar Roberson as the only player in NBA history to average a triple-double. Westbrook registered a league-best 31.6 points, 10.7 rebounds (10th in the NBA), 10.4 assists (third in the NBA) and 1.63 steals in 34.6 minutes per game.

== Offseason ==
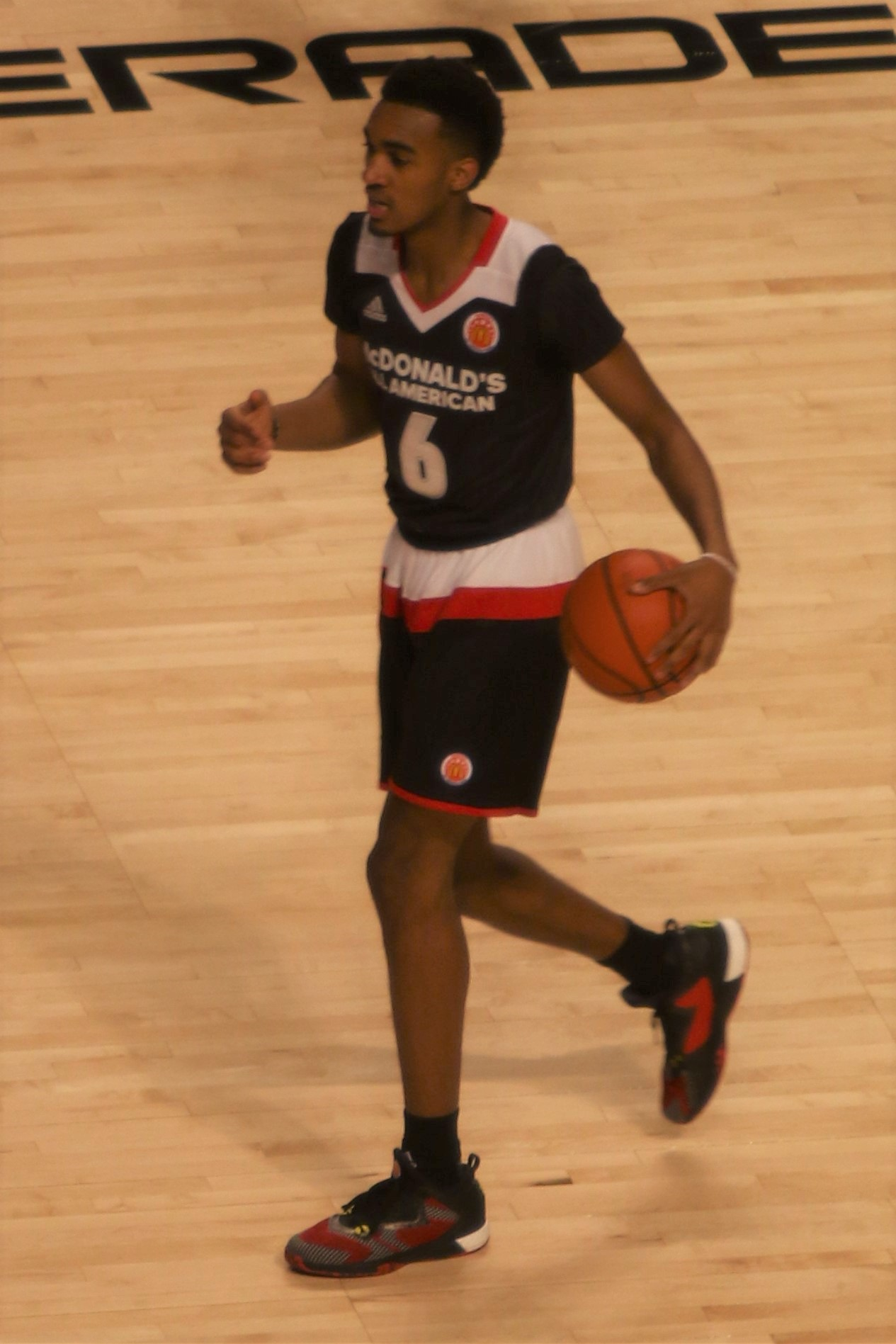
Terrance Ferguson was selected 21st overall by the Oklahoma City Thunder.

=== Draft picks ===
| Round | Pick | Player | Position | Nationality | Club team |
|---|---|---|---|---|---|
| 1 | 21 | Terrance Ferguson | SG | United States | (Australia) Adelaide 36ers (NBL) |

The Thunder had only their own first-round pick entering the draft. The Thunder traded their 2017 second-round pick in the Joffrey Lauvergne trade to the Denver Nuggets back in 2016. The Thunder ended 2017 NBA draft night with Australia's NBL Terrance Ferguson.

=== Trades ===
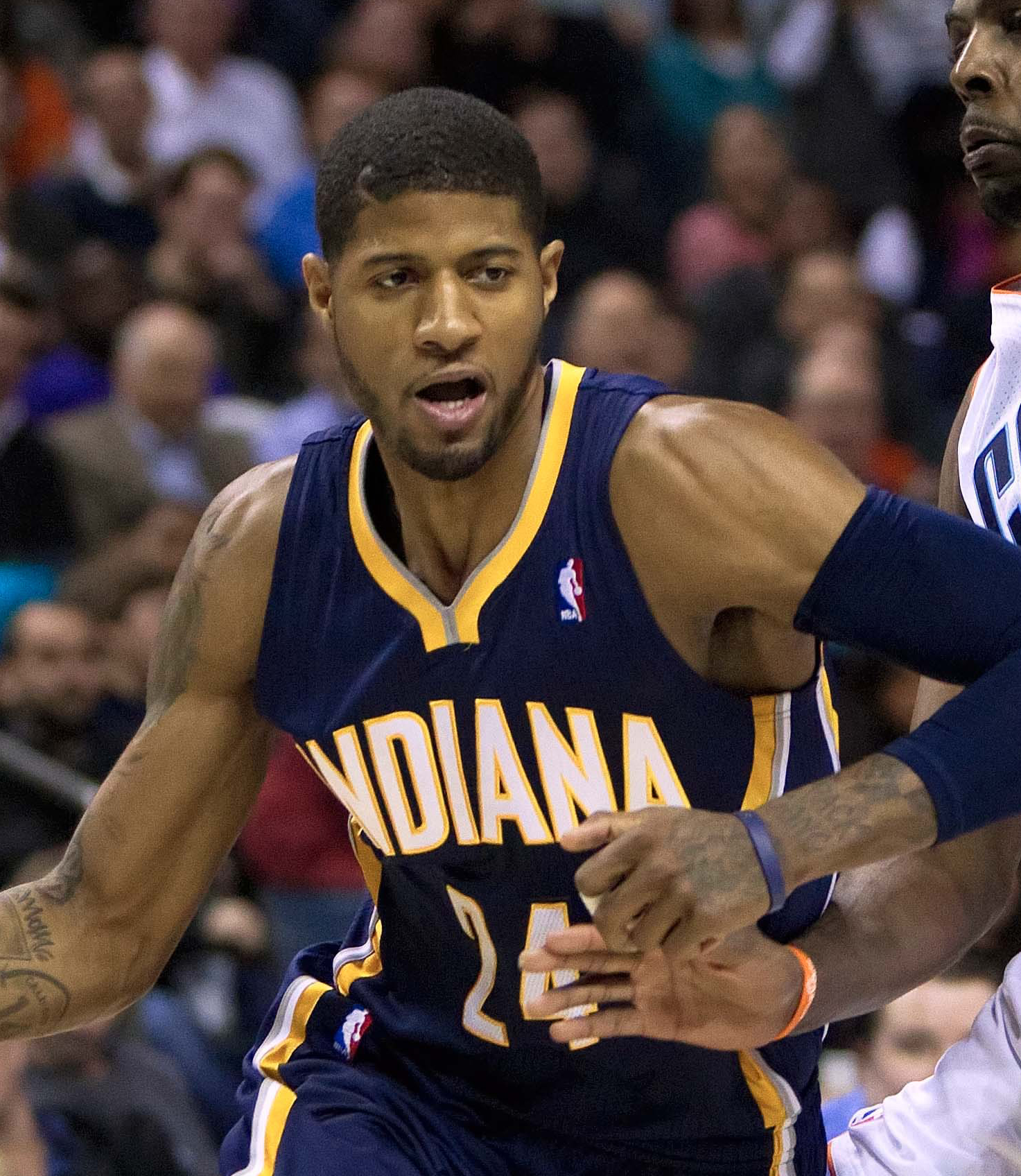
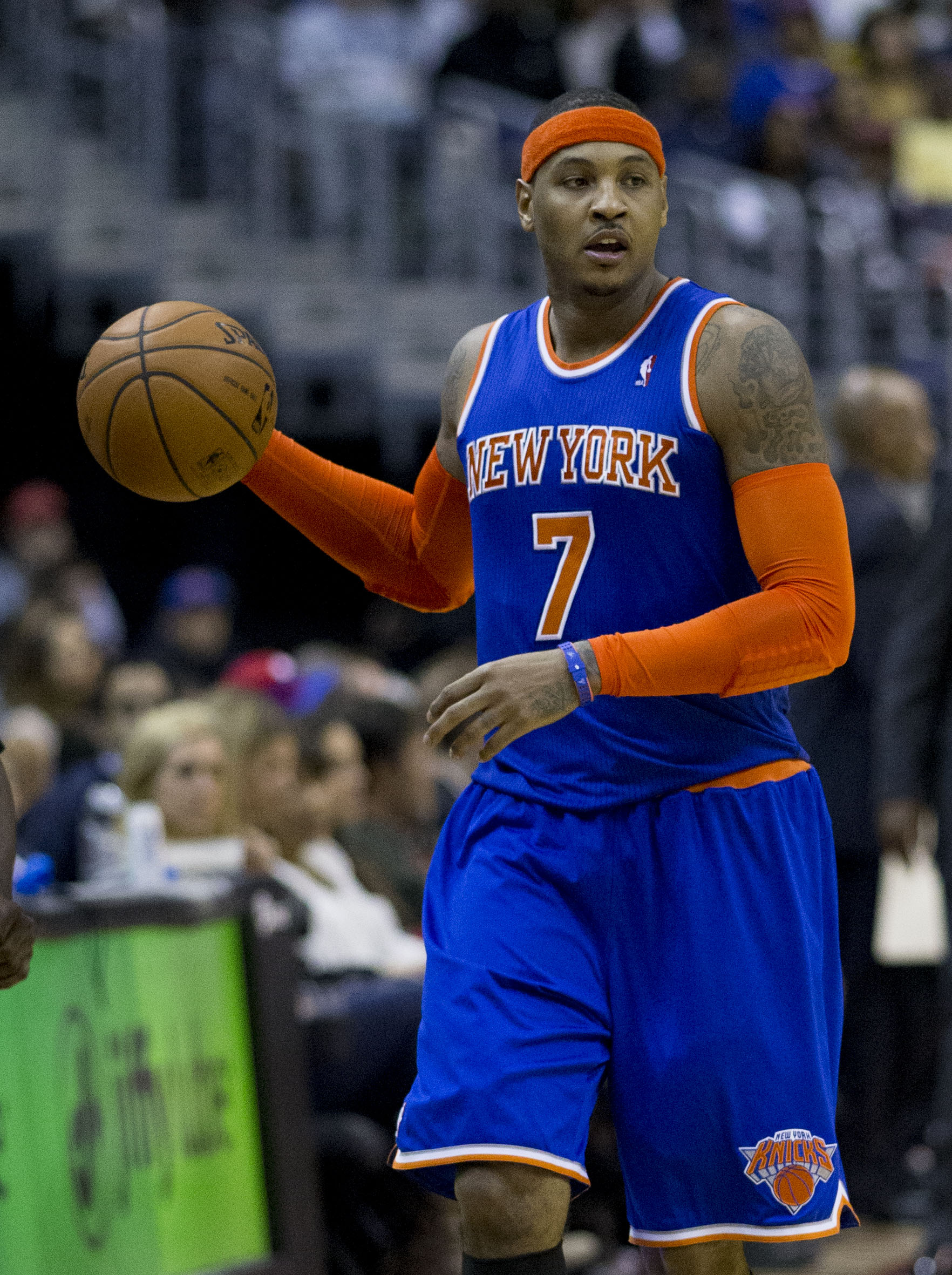
Paul George and Carmelo Anthony were traded to the Thunder.

On July 6, the Thunder traded Victor Oladipo and Domantas Sabonis to the Indiana Pacers in exchange for Paul George. George was traded by the Pacers after rumors of George wanting to leave in free agency for the Los Angeles Lakers. The Thunder decided to trade and gamble that a season with George on the roster will entice him to re-sign long term. George came to the Thunder as a four-time All Star, winner of the 2012–13 season Most Improved Player Award, All-NBA Third team honors three times, NBA All-Defensive First Team once and All-Defensive Second team twice.

On September 25, the Thunder traded Enes Kanter, Doug McDermott and a 2018 second-round pick via CHI to the New York Knicks in exchange for Carmelo Anthony. Anthony had been the focal point of intense trade speculation throughout the offseason while owning a no-trade clause in his contract. Both Russell Westbrook and Paul George "played an immense part" in convincing Anthony to waive his no-trade clause to join the Thunder. Anthony came to the Thunder as a 10-time All Star, All-NBA Second team honors two times, All-NBA Third team honors four times and a three-time Olympic gold medalist.

=== Free agency ===
For this offseason, free agency began on July 1, 2017, while the July moratorium ended on July 6. Norris Cole, Nick Collison and Taj Gibson were set to hit unrestricted free agency while Andre Roberson was set to hit restricted free agency. On July 2, it was reported that Taj Gibson agreed to a two-year, $28 million deal with the Minnesota Timberwolves, which he later signed on July 10. On July 5, it was reported that Andre Roberson agreed to a three-year, $30 million contract extension to stay with the Thunder, which he later signed on July 14. On July 21, Nick Collison agreed to a new contract to stay with the Thunder. Sam Presti called Collison "one of the founding members of our organization and culture, it goes without saying that he has helped set internal standards and built a legacy that Thunder fans will remain indebted to for years to come." Cole, who was not re-signed, signed a one-year deal with the Israeli team Maccabi Tel Aviv of the EuroLeague.

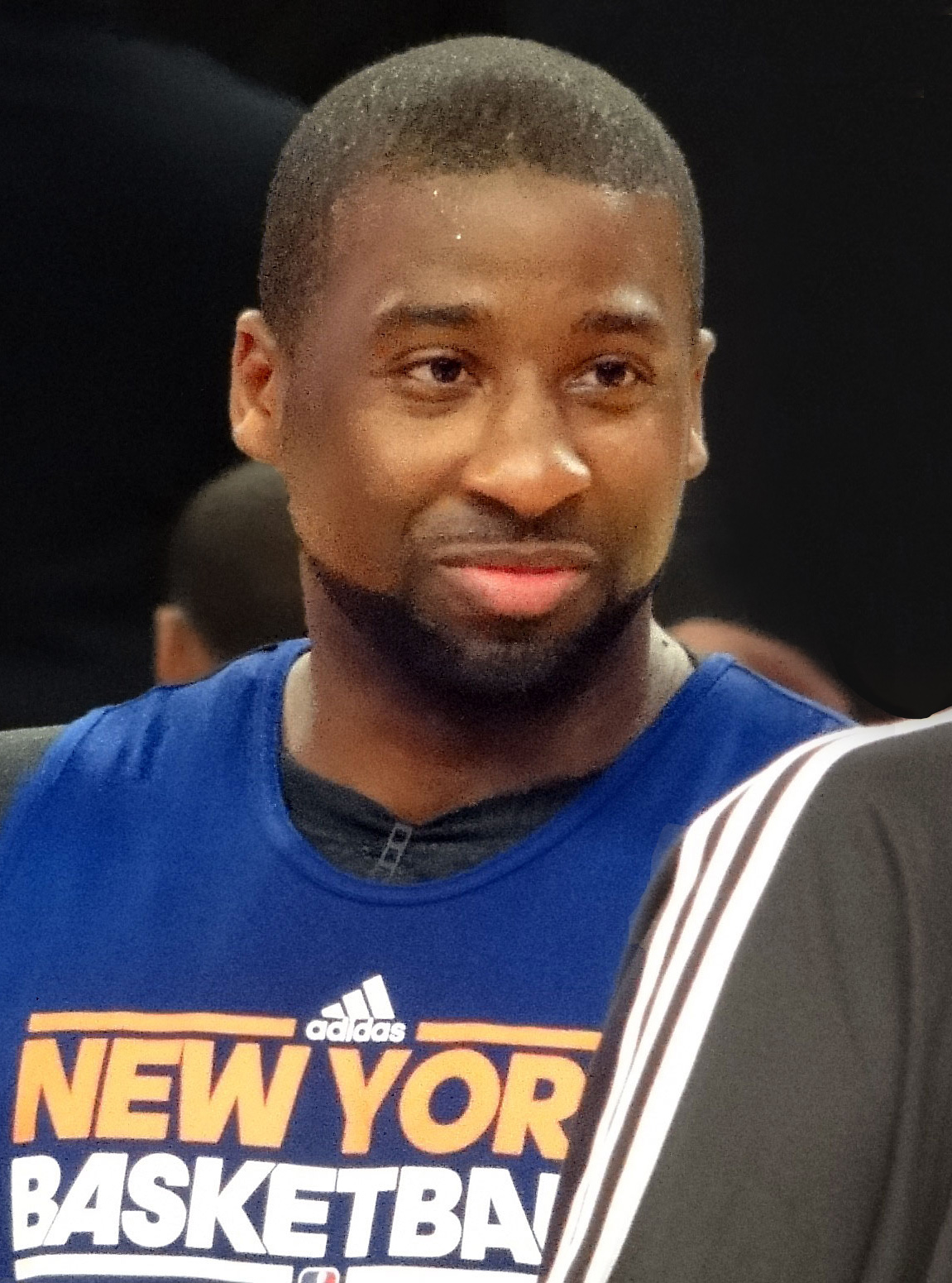
Raymond Felton

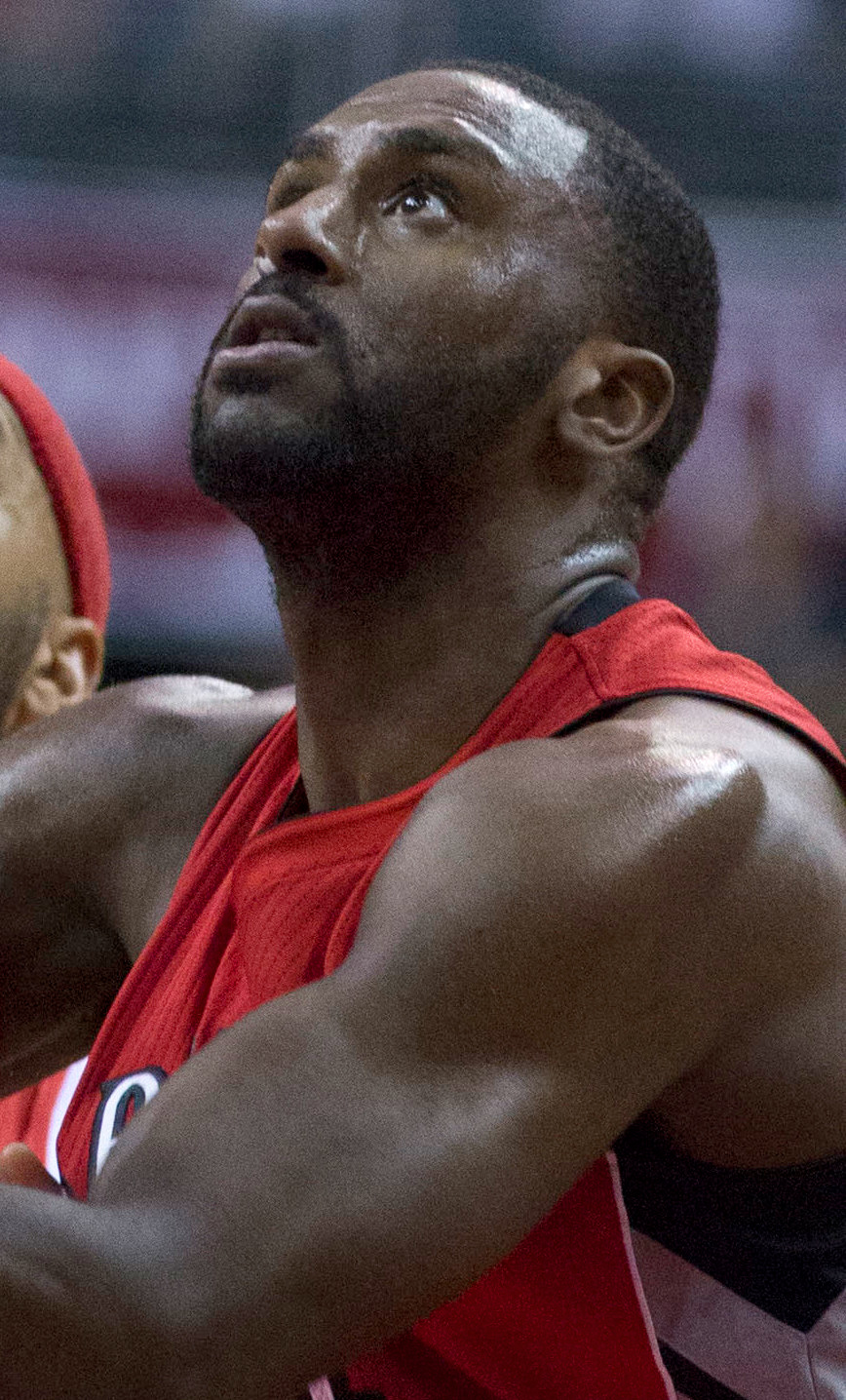
Patrick Patterson

On July 7, it was reported that Raymond Felton agreed to a one-year, $2.3 million deal with the Thunder, which he later signed on July 10. Felton spent the 2016–17 season with the Los Angeles Clippers. A day after losing Taj Gibson, on July 4, it was reported that Patrick Patterson agreed to a three-year, $16.4 million deal with the Thunder, which he later signed on July 10. Patterson spent the 2016–17 season with the Toronto Raptors.

On July 22, Dakari Johnson signed a deal with the Thunder. Johnson was originally selected 48th overall in the 2015 NBA draft but did not a sign a contract in the 2015–16 season, instead playing two seasons with the Oklahoma City Blue.

Starting in the 2017–18 season, each team is allowed two players on two-way contracts, in addition to the standard 15 players on the roster. On August 3, Daniel Hamilton signed a two-way contract with the Thunder, splitting time with the Thunder and the Oklahoma City Blue. Hamilton spent the 2016-17 season with the Blue. To fill in the other slot, PJ Dozier signed a two-way contract with the Thunder on October 17. Dozier came undrafted out of South Carolina.

On October 14, Semaj Christon was waived by the Thunder as his $1.3 million salary would have become fully guaranteed for the season. The Thunder opted for 14 guaranteed roster spots rather than 15.

On September 29, Russell Westbrook agreed to a five-year, $205 million contract extension with the Thunder. Westbrook's deal was the biggest guaranteed contract at the time in 2017.

I’ve said it before, and I’ll say it again, there is no place I would rather be than Oklahoma City. I am so honored to have the opportunity to continue my career here with the Thunder. From day one the support that Mr. Bennett, Sam, Troy and the entire organization have given me and my family has been incredible, and we are so grateful. When you play in Oklahoma City you play in front of the best fans in the world, I’m looking forward to bringing everything I’ve got, for them, this city and for this organization. WHY NOT?

— Russell Westbrook

=== Front office and coaching changes ===
On May 15, Thunder assistant Anthony Grant was hired as the head coach of the Dayton Flyers. Coming over when Billy Donovan was hired, Grant served as an assistant coach for the Thunder for two seasons.

On October 2, the Thunder announced Rob Hennigan as Vice President of Insight & Foresight. Hennigan rejoins the Thunder after serving as the general manager of the Orlando Magic for five seasons.

== Roster ==
2017–18 Oklahoma City Thunder roster
Players

| Pos. | No. | Player | Height | Weight | DOB | From |
|---|---|---|---|---|---|---|
| SG | 8 | Álex Abrines | 6 ft 6 in (1.98 m) | 190 lb (86 kg) | 1993-08-01 | Spain |
| C | 12 | Steven Adams | 6 ft 11 in (2.11 m) | 255 lb (116 kg) | 1993-07-20 | Pittsburgh |
| PF | 7 | Carmelo Anthony | 6 ft 7 in (2.01 m) | 240 lb (109 kg) | 1984-05-29 | Syracuse |
| SG | 3 | Corey Brewer | 6 ft 9 in (2.06 m) | 186 lb (84 kg) | 1986-03-05 | Florida |
| PF | 4 | Nick Collison | 6 ft 10 in (2.08 m) | 255 lb (116 kg) | 1980-10-26 | Kansas |
| PG | 35 | PJ Dozier (TW) | 6 ft 6 in (1.98 m) | 205 lb (93 kg) | 1996-10-25 | South Carolina |
| PG | 2 | Raymond Felton | 6 ft 1 in (1.85 m) | 205 lb (93 kg) | 1984-06-26 | North Carolina |
| SG | 23 | Terrance Ferguson | 6 ft 7 in (2.01 m) | 184 lb (83 kg) | 1998-05-17 | Advanced Prep International (TX) |
| SF | 13 | Paul George | 6 ft 8 in (2.03 m) | 220 lb (100 kg) | 1990-05-02 | Fresno State |
| PF | 9 | Jerami Grant | 6 ft 8 in (2.03 m) | 220 lb (100 kg) | 1994-03-12 | Syracuse |
| SG | 25 | Daniel Hamilton (TW) | 6 ft 7 in (2.01 m) | 195 lb (88 kg) | 1995-08-08 | Connecticut |
| PF | 34 | Josh Huestis | 6 ft 7 in (2.01 m) | 230 lb (104 kg) | 1991-12-19 | Stanford |
| C | 44 | Dakari Johnson | 7 ft 0 in (2.13 m) | 255 lb (116 kg) | 1995-09-22 | Kentucky |
| PF | 54 | Patrick Patterson | 6 ft 9 in (2.06 m) | 230 lb (104 kg) | 1989-03-14 | Kentucky |
| SG | 21 | André Roberson | 6 ft 7 in (2.01 m) | 210 lb (95 kg) | 1991-12-04 | Colorado |
| SF | 15 | Kyle Singler | 6 ft 8 in (2.03 m) | 228 lb (103 kg) | 1988-05-04 | Duke |
| PG | 0 | Russell Westbrook | 6 ft 3 in (1.91 m) | 200 lb (91 kg) | 1988-11-12 | UCLA |

Coaches
Head coach
- Billy Donovan
Assistant(s)
- Vin Bhavnani
- Mark Bryant
- Maurice Cheeks
- Adrian Griffin
- Royal Ivey
- Darko Rajaković

Legend
- (DP) Unsigned draft pick
- (FA) Free agent
- (S) Suspended
- (GL) On assignment to G League affiliate
- (TW) Two-way affiliate player
- Injured

Roster
Updated: March 30, 2018

== Standings ==
=== Conference ===
Western Conference
| # | Team | W | L | PCT | GB | GP |
|---|---|---|---|---|---|---|
| 1 | z – Houston Rockets * | 65 | 17 | .793 | – | 82 |
| 2 | y – Golden State Warriors * | 58 | 24 | .707 | 7.0 | 82 |
| 3 | y – Portland Trail Blazers * | 49 | 33 | .598 | 16.0 | 82 |
| 4 | x – Oklahoma City Thunder | 48 | 34 | .585 | 17.0 | 82 |
| 5 | x – Utah Jazz | 48 | 34 | .585 | 17.0 | 82 |
| 6 | x – New Orleans Pelicans | 48 | 34 | .585 | 17.0 | 82 |
| 7 | x – San Antonio Spurs | 47 | 35 | .573 | 18.0 | 82 |
| 8 | x – Minnesota Timberwolves | 47 | 35 | .573 | 18.0 | 82 |
| 9 | Denver Nuggets | 46 | 36 | .561 | 19.0 | 82 |
| 10 | Los Angeles Clippers | 42 | 40 | .512 | 23.0 | 82 |
| 11 | Los Angeles Lakers | 35 | 47 | .427 | 30.0 | 82 |
| 12 | Sacramento Kings | 27 | 55 | .329 | 38.0 | 82 |
| 13 | Dallas Mavericks | 24 | 58 | .293 | 41.0 | 82 |
| 14 | Memphis Grizzlies | 22 | 60 | .268 | 43.0 | 82 |
| 15 | Phoenix Suns | 21 | 61 | .256 | 44.0 | 82 |

=== Division ===
| Northwest Division | W | L | PCT | GB | Home | Road | Div | GP |
|---|---|---|---|---|---|---|---|---|
| y – Portland Trail Blazers | 49 | 33 | .598 | – | 28‍–‍13 | 21‍–‍20 | 9–7 | 82 |
| x – Oklahoma City Thunder | 48 | 34 | .585 | 1.0 | 27‍–‍14 | 21‍–‍20 | 5–11 | 82 |
| x – Utah Jazz | 48 | 34 | .585 | 1.0 | 28‍–‍13 | 20‍–‍21 | 7–9 | 82 |
| x – Minnesota Timberwolves | 47 | 35 | .573 | 2.0 | 30‍–‍11 | 17‍–‍24 | 10–6 | 82 |
| Denver Nuggets | 46 | 36 | .561 | 3.0 | 31‍–‍10 | 15‍–‍26 | 9–7 | 82 |

== Game log ==
=== Preseason ===
2017 pre-season game log
Total: 3–1 (home: 2–1; road: 1–0)
Pre-season: 3–1 (home: 2–1; road: 1–0)

| Game | Date | Team | Score | High points | High rebounds | High assists | Location Attendance | Record |
|---|---|---|---|---|---|---|---|---|
| 1 | October 3 | Houston | L 97–104 | Carmelo Anthony (19) | Josh Huestis (7) | Isaiah Canaan (6) | BOK Center; 17,733 | 0–1 |
| 2 | October 6 | New Orleans | W 102–91 | Paul George (25) | Daniel Hamilton (8) | Daniel Hamilton (5) | Chesapeake Energy Arena; N/A | 1–1 |
| 3 | October 8 | Melbourne | W 86–85 | Paul George (22) | Steven Adams (10) | Russell Westbrook(7) | Chesapeake Energy Arena; N/A | 2–1 |
| 4 | October 10 | @ Denver | W 96–86 | Russell Westbrook(20) | Paul George (11) | Russell Westbrook(7) | Pepsi Center; 10,000 | 3–1 |

2017–18 season schedule

=== Regular season ===
2017–18 game log
Total: 48–34 (home: 27–14; road: 21–20)
October: 4–3 (home: 2–1; road: 2–2)

| Game | Date | Team | Score | High points | High rebounds | High assists | Location Attendance | Record |
|---|---|---|---|---|---|---|---|---|
| 1 | October 19 | New York | W 105–84 | Paul George (28) | Russell Westbrook (10) | Russell Westbrook (16) | Chesapeake Energy Arena; 18,203 | 1–0 |
| 2 | October 21 | @ Utah | L 87–96 | Carmelo Anthony (26) | Russell Westbrook (10) | Russell Westbrook (16) | Vivint Smart Home Arena; 18,300 | 1–1 |
| 3 | October 22 | Minnesota | L 113–115 | Russell Westbrook (31) | Steven Adams (13) | Russell Westbrook (10) | Chesapeake Energy Arena; 18,203 | 1–2 |
| 4 | October 25 | Indiana | W 114–96 | Anthony, Westbrook (28) | Steven Adams (13) | Russell Westbrook (16) | Chesapeake Energy Arena; 18,203 | 2–2 |
| 5 | October 27 | @ Minnesota | L 116–119 | Russell Westbrook (27) | Adams, Westbrook (8) | Russell Westbrook (9) | Target Center; 17,620 | 2–3 |
| 6 | October 28 | @ Chicago | W 101–69 | Carmelo Anthony (21) | Russell Westbrook (13) | Russell Westbrook (13) | United Center; 21,706 | 3–3 |
| 7 | October 31 | @ Milwaukee | W 110–91 | Paul George (28) | Steven Adams (11) | Russell Westbrook (9) | Bradley Center; 16,713 | 4–3 |

November : 4–9 (home: 4–2; road: 0–7)

| Game | Date | Team | Score | High points | High rebounds | High assists | Location Attendance | Record |
|---|---|---|---|---|---|---|---|---|
| 8 | November 3 | Boston | L 94–101 | Paul George (25) | Carmelo Anthony (14) | Russell Westbrook (11) | Chesapeake Energy Arena; 18,203 | 4–4 |
| 9 | November 5 | @ Portland | L 99–103 | Paul George (27) | Jerami Grant (7) | Russell Westbrook (9) | Moda Center; 19,393 | 4–5 |
| 10 | November 7 | @ Sacramento | L 86–94 | Russell Westbrook (20) | Russell Westbrook (12) | Russell Westbrook (6) | Golden 1 Center; 17,583 | 4–6 |
| 11 | November 9 | @ Denver | L 94–102 | Carmelo Anthony (28) | Steven Adams (11) | Roberson, Westbrook (5) | Pepsi Center; 19,520 | 4–7 |
| 12 | November 10 | LA Clippers | W 120–111 | Paul George (42) | Andre Roberson (11) | Russell Westbrook (8) | Chesapeake Energy Arena; 18,203 | 5–7 |
| 13 | November 12 | Dallas | W 112–99 | Paul George (37) | George, Grant (8) | Felton, George, Westbrook (5) | Chesapeake Energy Arena; 18,203 | 6–7 |
| 14 | November 15 | Chicago | W 92–79 | Russell Westbrook (21) | Carmelo Anthony (11) | Russell Westbrook (7) | Chesapeake Energy Arena; 18,203 | 7–7 |
| 15 | November 17 | @ San Antonio | L 101–104 | Carmelo Anthony (20) | Russell Westbrook (9) | Russell Westbrook (9) | AT&T Center; 18,418 | 7–8 |
| 16 | November 20 | @ New Orleans | L 107–114 | Paul George (37) | Russell Westbrook (16) | Russell Westbrook (12) | Smoothie King Center; 16,765 | 7–9 |
| 17 | November 22 | Golden State | W 108–91 | Russell Westbrook (34) | Steven Adams (12) | Russell Westbrook (9) | Chesapeake Energy Arena; 18,203 | 8–9 |
| 18 | November 24 | Detroit | L 98–99 | Russell Westbrook (27) | Steven Adams (12) | Russell Westbrook (11) | Chesapeake Energy Arena; 18,203 | 8–10 |
| 19 | November 25 | @ Dallas | L 81–97 | Russell Westbrook (28) | Russell Westbrook (12) | Paul George (10) | American Airlines Center; 20,340 | 8–11 |
| 20 | November 29 | @ Orlando | L 108–121 | Russell Westbrook (37) | Russell Westbrook (11) | George, Westbrook (5) | Amway Center; 17,797 | 8–12 |

December : 12–5 (home: 8–3; road: 4–2)

| Game | Date | Team | Score | High points | High rebounds | High assists | Location Attendance | Record |
|---|---|---|---|---|---|---|---|---|
| 21 | December 1 | Minnesota | W 111–107 | Paul George (36) | Russell Westbrook (9) | Russell Westbrook (12) | Chesapeake Energy Arena; 18,203 | 9–12 |
| 22 | December 3 | San Antonio | W 90–87 | Russell Westbrook (22) | Adams, Westbrook (10) | Russell Westbrook (10) | Chesapeake Energy Arena; 18,203 | 10–12 |
| 23 | December 5 | Utah | W 100–94 | Russell Westbrook (34) | Russell Westbrook (13) | Russell Westbrook (14) | Chesapeake Energy Arena; 18,203 | 11–12 |
| 24 | December 7 | @ Brooklyn | L 95–100 | Russell Westbrook (31) | Steven Adams (14) | Russell Westbrook (6) | Mexico City Arena; 20,562 | 11–13 |
| 25 | December 9 | @ Memphis | W 102–101 (OT) | Adams, Anthony (21) | Russell Westbrook (11) | Russell Westbrook (14) | FedEx Forum; 17,794 | 12–13 |
| 26 | December 11 | Charlotte | L 103–116 | Russell Westbrook (30) | Steven Adams (10) | Russell Westbrook (7) | Chesapeake Energy Arena; 18,203 | 12–14 |
| 27 | December 13 | @ Indiana | W 100–95 | Steven Adams (23) | Russell Westbrook (17) | Russell Westbrook (12) | Bankers Life Fieldhouse; 17,923 | 13–14 |
| 28 | December 15 | @ Philadelphia | W 119–117 (3OT) | Russell Westbrook (27) | Russell Westbrook (18) | Russell Westbrook (15) | Wells Fargo Center; 20,612 | 14–14 |
| 29 | December 16 | @ New York | L 96–111 | Russell Westbrook (25) | Paul George (9) | Russell Westbrook (7) | Madison Square Garden; 19,812 | 14–15 |
| 30 | December 18 | Denver | W 95–94 | Russell Westbrook (38) | Russell Westbrook (9) | Russell Westbrook (6) | Chesapeake Energy Arena; 18,203 | 15–15 |
| 31 | December 20 | Utah | W 107–79 | Russell Westbrook (24) | Russell Westbrook (10) | Russell Westbrook (7) | Chesapeake Energy Arena; 18,203 | 16–15 |
| 32 | December 22 | Atlanta | W 120–117 | Russell Westbrook (30) | Steven Adams (10) | Russell Westbrook (15) | Chesapeake Energy Arena; 18,203 | 17–15 |
| 33 | December 23 | @ Utah | W 103–89 | Russell Westbrook (27) | Russell Westbrook (10) | Russell Westbrook (10) | Vivint Smart Home Arena; 18,306 | 18–15 |
| 34 | December 25 | Houston | W 112–107 | Russell Westbrook (31) | Steven Adams (10) | Russell Westbrook (11) | Chesapeake Energy Arena; 18,203 | 19–15 |
| 35 | December 27 | Toronto | W 124–107 | Paul George (33) | Andre Roberson (10) | Russell Westbrook (13) | Chesapeake Energy Arena; 18,203 | 20–15 |
| 36 | December 29 | Milwaukee | L 95–97 | Russell Westbrook (40) | Russell Westbrook (14) | Russell Westbrook (9) | Chesapeake Energy Arena; 18,203 | 20–16 |
| 37 | December 31 | Dallas | L 113–116 | Russell Westbrook (38) | Russell Westbrook (15) | Russell Westbrook (11) | Chesapeake Energy Arena; 18,203 | 20–17 |

January : 10–4 (home: 5–1; road: 5–3)

| Game | Date | Team | Score | High points | High rebounds | High assists | Location Attendance | Record |
|---|---|---|---|---|---|---|---|---|
| 38 | January 3 | @ LA Lakers | W 133–96 | Terrance Ferguson (24) | Josh Huestis (9) | Russell Westbrook (12) | Staples Center; 18,997 | 21–17 |
| 39 | January 4 | @ LA Clippers | W 127–117 | Paul George (31) | Russell Westbrook (12) | Russell Westbrook (11) | Staples Center; 19,068 | 22–17 |
| 40 | January 7 | @ Phoenix | L 100–114 | Russell Westbrook (26) | Russell Westbrook (10) | Russell Westbrook (11) | Talking Stick Resort Arena; 18,055 | 22–18 |
| 41 | January 9 | Portland | L 106–117 | George, Westbrook (22) | Russell Westbrook (9) | Russell Westbrook (12) | Chesapeake Energy Arena; 18,203 | 22–19 |
| 42 | January 10 | @ Minnesota | L 88–104 | Russell Westbrook (38) | Russell Westbrook (10) | Russell Westbrook (5) | Target Center; 18,978 | 22–20 |
| 43 | January 13 | @ Charlotte | W 101–91 | Russell Westbrook (25) | Steven Adams (11) | Russell Westbrook (7) | Spectrum Center; 19,624 | 23–20 |
| 44 | January 15 | Sacramento | W 95–88 | Paul George (20) | Russell Westbrook (16) | Russell Westbrook (9) | Chesapeake Energy Arena; 18,203 | 24–20 |
| 45 | January 17 | LA Lakers | W 114–90 | Carmelo Anthony (27) | Steven Adams (10) | Russell Westbrook (7) | Chesapeake Energy Arena; 18,203 | 25–20 |
| 46 | January 20 | @ Cleveland | W 148–124 | Paul George (36) | Carmelo Anthony (10) | Russell Westbrook (20) | Quicken Loans Arena; 20,562 | 26–20 |
| 47 | January 23 | Brooklyn | W 109–108 | Russell Westbrook (32) | Steven Adams (14) | Russell Westbrook (6) | Chesapeake Energy Arena; 18,203 | 27–20 |
| 48 | January 25 | Washington | W 121–112 | Russell Westbrook (46) | Steven Adams (10) | Russell Westbrook (6) | Chesapeake Energy Arena; 18,203 | 28–20 |
| 49 | January 27 | @ Detroit | W 121–108 | Russell Westbrook (31) | Russell Westbrook (11) | Russell Westbrook (13) | Little Caesars Arena; 20,491 | 29–20 |
| 50 | January 28 | Philadelphia | W 122–112 | Russell Westbrook (37) | Steven Adams (13) | Russell Westbrook (14) | Chesapeake Energy Arena; 18,203 | 30–20 |
| 51 | January 30 | @ Washington | L 96–102 | Paul George (28) | Steven Adams (12) | Russell Westbrook (10) | Capital One Arena; 20,356 | 30–21 |

February : 6–6 (home: 2–3; road: 4–3)

| Game | Date | Team | Score | High points | High rebounds | High assists | Location Attendance | Record |
|---|---|---|---|---|---|---|---|---|
| 52 | February 1 | @ Denver | L 124–127 | Paul George (43) | Russell Westbrook (9) | Russell Westbrook (21) | Pepsi Center; 18,407 | 30–22 |
| 53 | February 2 | New Orleans | L 100–114 | Steven Adams (23) | Steven Adams (12) | Russell Westbrook (14) | Chesapeake Energy Arena; 18,203 | 30–23 |
| 54 | February 4 | L.A. Lakers | L 104–108 | Russell Westbrook (36) | Carmelo Anthony (13) | Russell Westbrook (9) | Chesapeake Energy Arena; 18,203 | 30–24 |
| 55 | February 6 | @ Golden State | W 125–105 | Paul George (38) | Steven Adams (10) | Russell Westbrook (9) | Oracle Arena; 19,596 | 31–24 |
| 56 | February 8 | @ L.A. Lakers | L 81–106 | Paul George (29) | Adams, George (9) | George, Felton, Hamilton (3) | Staples Center; 18,997 | 31–25 |
| 57 | February 11 | Memphis | W 110–92 | Paul George (33) | Steven Adams (9) | Felton, George (8) | Chesapeake Energy Arena; 18,203 | 32–25 |
| 58 | February 13 | Cleveland | L 112–120 | Paul George (25) | Steven Adams (17) | Russell Westbrook (12) | Chesapeake Energy Arena; 18,203 | 32–26 |
| 59 | February 14 | @ Memphis | W 121–114 | Paul George (28) | Russell Westbrook (13) | Russell Westbrook (15) | FedEx Forum; 16,012 | 33–26 |
All-Star Break
| 60 | February 22 | @ Sacramento | W 110–107 | Paul George (26) | Russell Westbrook (15) | Russell Westbrook (11) | Golden 1 Center; 17,583 | 34–26 |
| 61 | February 24 | @ Golden State | L 80–112 | Russell Westbrook (17) | Russell Westbrook (12) | Russell Westbrook (7) | Oracle Arena; 19,596 | 34–27 |
| 62 | February 26 | Orlando | W 112–105 | Paul George (26) | Russell Westbrook (12) | Russell Westbrook (11) | Chesapeake Energy Arena; 18,203 | 35–27 |
| 63 | February 28 | @ Dallas | W 111–110 (OT) | Russell Westbrook (30) | Steven Adams (12) | Russell Westbrook (7) | American Airlines Center; 20,202 | 36–27 |

March : 8–6 (home: 5–3; road: 3–3)

| Game | Date | Team | Score | High points | High rebounds | High assists | Location Attendance | Record |
|---|---|---|---|---|---|---|---|---|
| 64 | March 2 | @ Phoenix | W 124–116 | Russell Westbrook (43) | Russell Westbrook (14) | Russell Westbrook (8) | Talking Stick Resort Arena; 18,055 | 37–27 |
| 65 | March 3 | @ Portland | L 100–108 | Russell Westbrook (30) | Russell Westbrook (11) | Russell Westbrook (6) | Moda Center; 20,063 | 37–28 |
| 66 | March 6 | Houston | L 112–122 | Russell Westbrook (32) | Steven Adams (8) | Russell Westbrook (7) | Chesapeake Energy Arena; 18,203 | 37–29 |
| 67 | March 8 | Phoenix | W 115–87 | Russell Westbrook (27) | Steven Adams (9) | Russell Westbrook (9) | Chesapeake Energy Arena; 18,203 | 38–29 |
| 68 | March 10 | San Antonio | W 104–94 | Russell Westbrook (21) | Russell Westbrook (12) | Russell Westbrook (10) | Chesapeake Energy Arena; 18,203 | 39–29 |
| 69 | March 12 | Sacramento | W 106–101 | Anthony, George (21) | Russell Westbrook (10) | Russell Westbrook (11) | Chesapeake Energy Arena; 18,203 | 40–29 |
| 70 | March 13 | @ Atlanta | W 119–107 | Russell Westbrook (32) | Russell Westbrook (12) | Russell Westbrook (12) | Philips Arena; 16,739 | 41–29 |
| 71 | March 16 | L.A. Clippers | W 121–113 | Corey Brewer (24) | Steven Adams (14) | Russell Westbrook (11) | Chesapeake Energy Arena; 18,203 | 42–29 |
| 72 | March 18 | @ Toronto | W 132–125 | Russell Westbrook (37) | Russell Westbrook (13) | Russell Westbrook (14) | Air Canada Centre; 19,800 | 43–29 |
| 73 | March 20 | @ Boston | L 99–100 | Russell Westbrook (27) | Paul George (13) | Russell Westbrook (7) | TD Garden; 18,624 | 43–30 |
| 74 | March 23 | Miami | W 105–99 | Russell Westbrook (29) | Russell Westbrook (13) | Russell Westbrook (8) | Chesapeake Energy Arena; 18,203 | 44–30 |
| 75 | Marsh 25 | Portland | L 105–108 | Russell Westbrook (23) | Steven Adams (10) | Russell Westbrook (9) | Chesapeake Energy Arena; 18,203 | 44–31 |
| 76 | March 29 | @ San Antonio | L 99–103 | Paul George (26) | Steven Adams (13) | Paul George (6) | AT&T Center; 18,203 | 44–32 |
| 77 | March 30 | Denver | L 125–126 (OT) | Russell Westbrook (33) | Steven Adams (10) | Russell Westbrook (13) | Chesapeake Energy Arena; 18,203 | 44–33 |

April : 4–1 (home: 1–1; road: 3–0)

| Game | Date | Team | Score | High points | High rebounds | High assists | Location Attendance | Record |
|---|---|---|---|---|---|---|---|---|
| 78 | April 1 | @ New Orleans | W 109–104 | Russell Westbrook (26) | Russell Westbrook (15) | Russell Westbrook (13) | Smoothie King Center; 18,500 | 45–33 |
| 79 | April 3 | Golden State | L 107–111 | Russell Westbrook (44) | Russell Westbrook (16) | Russell Westbrook (6) | Chesapeake Energy Arena; 18,203 | 45–34 |
| 80 | April 7 | @ Houston | W 108–102 | George, Westbrook (24) | Steven Adams (8) | Russell Westbrook (10) | Toyota Center; 18,055 | 46–34 |
| 81 | April 9 | @ Miami | W 115–93 | Russell Westbrook (23) | Russell Westbrook (18) | Russell Westbrook (13) | American Airlines Arena; 19,600 | 47–34 |
| 82 | April 11 | Memphis | W 137–123 | Paul George (40) | Russell Westbrook (20) | Russell Westbrook (19) | Chesapeake Energy Arena; 18,203 | 48–34 |

2017–18 season schedule

=== Playoffs ===
2018 playoff game log
Total: 2–4 (home: 2–1; road: 0–3)
First Round: 2–4 (home: 2–1; road: 0–3)

| Game | Date | Team | Score | High points | High rebounds | High assists | Location Attendance | Series |
|---|---|---|---|---|---|---|---|---|
| 1 | April 15 | Utah | W 116–108 | Paul George (36) | Russell Westbrook (13) | Russell Westbrook (8) | Chesapeake Energy Arena; 18,203 | 1–0 |
| 2 | April 18 | Utah | L 95–102 | Russell Westbrook (19) | Paul George (10) | Russell Westbrook (13) | Chesapeake Energy Arena; 18,203 | 1–1 |
| 3 | April 21 | @ Utah | L 102–115 | Paul George (23) | Russell Westbrook (11) | Russell Westbrook (9) | Vivint Smart Home Arena; 18,306 | 1–2 |
| 4 | April 23 | @ Utah | L 96–113 | Paul George (32) | Russell Westbrook (14) | Russell Westbrook (3) | Vivint Smart Home Arena; 18,306 | 1–3 |
| 5 | April 25 | Utah | W 107–99 | Russell Westbrook (45) | Russell Westbrook (15) | Russell Westbrook (7) | Chesapeake Energy Arena; 18,203 | 2–3 |
| 6 | April 27 | @ Utah | L 91–96 | Russell Westbrook (46) | Steven Adams (15) | Paul George (8) | Vivint Smart Home Arena; 18,306 | 2–4 |

2018 playoff schedule

== Player statistics ==
Legend
| GP | Games played | GS | Games started | MPG | Minutes per game |
| FG% | Field goal percentage | 3P% | 3-point field goal percentage | FT% | Free throw percentage |
| RPG | Rebounds per game | APG | Assists per game | SPG | Steals per game |
| BPG | Blocks per game | PPG | Points per game | **Bold** | Career high |

=== Regular season ===
Oklahoma City Thunder statistics
| Player | GP | GS | MPG | FG% | 3P% | FT% | RPG | APG | SPG | BPG | PPG |
|---|---|---|---|---|---|---|---|---|---|---|---|
| Alex Abrines | 75 | 8 | 15.1 | 39.5% | 38.0% | 84.8% | 1.5 | 0.4 | 0.5 | 0.1 | 4.7 |
| Steven Adams | 76 | 76 | 32.7 | 62.9% | 0.0% | 55.9% | 9.0 | 1.2 | 1.2 | 1.0 | 13.9 |
| Carmelo Anthony | 78 | 78 | 32.1 | 40.4% | 35.7% | 76.7% | 5.8 | 1.3 | 0.6 | 0.6 | 16.2 |
| Corey Brewer ^{≠} | 18 | 16 | 28.6 | 44.4% | 34.3% | 79.5% | 3.4 | 1.3 | 2.1 | 0.3 | 10.1 |
| Nick Collison | 15 | 0 | 5.0 | 68.4% | - | 38.5% | 1.3 | 0.3 | 0.0 | 0.0 | 2.1 |
| PJ Dozier | 2 | 0 | 1.5 | 50.0% | - | - | 0.5 | 0.0 | 0.0 | 0.0 | 1.0 |
| Raymond Felton | 82 | 2 | 16.6 | 40.6% | 35.2% | 81.8% | 1.9 | 2.5 | 0.6 | 0.2 | 6.9 |
| Terrance Ferguson | 61 | 12 | 12.5 | 41.4% | 33.3% | 90.0% | 0.8 | 0.3 | 0.4 | 0.2 | 3.1 |
| Paul George | 79 | 79 | 36.6 | 43.0% | 40.1% | 82.2% | 5.7 | 3.3 | 2.0 | 0.5 | 21.9 |
| Jerami Grant | 81 | 1 | 20.3 | 53.5% | 29.1% | 67.5% | 3.9 | 0.7 | 0.4 | 1.0 | 8.4 |
| Daniel Hamilton | 6 | 0 | 4.7 | 45.5% | 40.0% | - | 0.8 | 1.3 | 0.2 | 0.0 | 2.0 |
| Josh Huestis | 69 | 10 | 14.2 | 33.0% | 28.7% | 30.0% | 2.3 | 0.3 | 0.2 | 0.6 | 2.3 |
| Dakari Johnson | 31 | 6 | 5.2 | 56.4% | - | 55.0% | 1.1 | 0.3 | 0.2 | 0.3 | 1.8 |
| Patrick Patterson | 82 | 3 | 15.5 | 39.8% | 38.6% | 87.0% | 2.4 | 0.7 | 0.6 | 0.3 | 3.9 |
| Andre Roberson | 39 | 39 | 26.6 | 53.7% | 22.2% | 31.6% | 4.7 | 1.2 | 1.2 | 0.9 | 5.0 |
| Kyle Singler | 12 | 0 | 4.9 | 33.3% | 40.0% | 53.8% | 0.8 | 0.2 | 0.1 | 0.0 | 1.9 |
| Russell Westbrook | 80 | 80 | 36.4 | 44.9% | 29.8% | 73.7% | 10.1 | 10.3 | 1.8 | 0.3 | 25.4 |

Led team in statistic

After all games.
^{‡} Waived during the season
^{†} Traded during the season
^{≠} Acquired during the season

=== Playoffs ===
Oklahoma City Thunder statistics
| Player | GP | GS | MPG | FG% | 3P% | FT% | RPG | APG | SPG | BPG | PPG |
|---|---|---|---|---|---|---|---|---|---|---|---|
| Alex Abrines | 6 | 0 | 18.3 | 40.0% | 46.2% | 100% | 2.7 | 0.3 | 0.8 | 0.3 | 4.0 |
| Steven Adams | 6 | 6 | 33.3 | 58.7% | - | 69.2% | 7.5 | 1.5 | 0.7 | 0.7 | 10.5 |
| Carmelo Anthony | 6 | 6 | 32.3 | 37.5% | 21.4% | 73.3% | 5.7 | 0.3 | 1.7 | 0.7 | 11.8 |
| Corey Brewer | 6 | 6 | 25.2 | 52.0% | 45.5% | 100% | 2.2 | 0.8 | 1.2 | 0.8 | 6.2 |
| Raymond Felton | 6 | 0 | 13.2 | 38.7% | 50.0% | 0.0% | 2.2 | 1.5 | 0.7 | 0.3 | 5.2 |
| Terrance Ferguson | 3 | 0 | 2.0 | 100% | 100% | - | 0.3 | 0.3 | 0.0 | 0.0 | 1.0 |
| Paul George | 6 | 6 | 41.8 | 40.8% | 36.5% | 86.1% | 6.0 | 2.7 | 1.3 | 0.7 | 24.7 |
| Jerami Grant | 6 | 0 | 22.2 | 51.4% | 25.0% | 45.5% | 3.3 | 1.0 | 0.7 | 0.5 | 7.2 |
| Josh Huestis | 4 | 0 | 4.8 | 50.0% | - | 50.0% | 0.8 | 0.0 | 0.3 | 0.3 | 0.8 |
| Dakari Johnson | 2 | 0 | 1.5 | - | - | - | 0.0 | 0.0 | 0.0 | 0.0 | 0.0 |
| Patrick Patterson | 6 | 0 | 9.7 | 50.0% | 50.0% | - | 1.8 | 0.5 | 0.2 | 0.0 | 1.3 |
| Russell Westbrook | 6 | 6 | 39.2 | 39.8% | 35.7% | 82.5% | 12.0 | 7.5 | 1.5 | 0.0 | 29.3 |

Led team in statistic

After all games.

=== Individual game highs ===
| Category | Player | Statistic |
|---|---|---|
| Points | Russell Westbrook | 46 vs Wizards on January 25, 2018 |
| Rebounds | Russell Westbrook | 20 vs Grizzlies on April 11, 2018 |
| Assists | Russell Westbrook | 21 vs Nuggets on February 1, 2018 |
| Steals | Paul George; Corey Brewer | 6 vs Warriors on February 6, 2018; 6 vs Clippers on March 16, 2018 |
| Blocks | Steven Adams | 5 vs Clippers on March 16, 2018 |
| Minutes | Russell Westbrook | 52:08 vs 76ers on December 15, 2017 |

| Category | Player | Statistic |
|---|---|---|
| Field goals made | Russell Westbrook; Paul George | 19 vs Wizards on January 25, 2018; 19 vs Nuggets on February 1, 2018 |
| Threes made | Paul George | 8 vs Grizzlies on April 11, 2018 |
| Free throws made | Paul George; Russell Westbrook | 12 vs Clippers on November 10, 2017; 12 vs Mavericks on November 12, 2017 |
| Double-doubles | Russell Westbrook | 59 |
| Triple-doubles | Russell Westbrook | 25 |

== Awards and records ==
=== Awards ===
| Date | Player | Award |
|---|---|---|
| December 26, 2017 | Russell Westbrook (1/2) | December 18–24 Player of the Week (Note: Westbrook helped lead the Thunder to a perfect 4-0 week while posting averages of 29.8 points on .598 percent shooting (49-82 FGs) to go along with 9.0 rebounds, 9.5 assists and 2.50 steals in 34.5 minutes. Westbrook’s triple-double on Dec. 23 at Utah represented the 11th of the season (OKC 9-2 in those games) and the 90th of his career.) |
| January 4, 2018 | Russell Westbrook (1/1) | December Player of the Month (Note: The reigning NBA MVP led Oklahoma City to a 12-5 record in December, third-best in the league, while averaging a triple-double of 27.8 points, 10.2 rebounds and 10.6 assists. He also accumulated the most points (472), assists (181) and steals (31) of any NBA player last month while holding the highest assist percentage (.497) and most fast break points per game (5.8).) |
| January 23, 2018 | Russell Westbrook | All-Star (Note: A two-time NBA All-Star game MVP, Westbrook is now scheduled to make his seventh career All-Star appearance.) |
| January 27, 2018 | Paul George | All-Star (Note: George is slated to make his fifth All-Star appearance, joining teammate Russell Westbrook on Team LeBron, replacing New Orleans’ DeMarcus Cousins.) |
| March 19, 2018 | Russell Westbrook (1/2) | March 12–18 Player of the Week (Note: The reigning NBA MVP led Oklahoma City to a 4-0 week as the Thunder has now won six consecutive games overall after last night’s victory in Toronto over the Eastern Conference-leading Raptors. Westbrook registered a triple-double in each contest this past week while averaging 25.5 points, 11.3 rebounds and 12.0 assists on .526 (41-78 FGs) shooting from the field.) |
| May 24, 2018 | Russell Westbrook | All-NBA Second Team (Note: This is Westbrook’s 7th selection to the All-NBA team in his career, commemorating yet another historic season in which Westbrook rose to fourth on the all-time triple-doubles list and averaged a triple-double for the season. One year after becoming just the second player besides Oscar Robertson to ever achieve that milestone, Westbrook finished with an average of 25.4 points, 10.3 assists and 10.1 rebounds per game while helping get a brand new group of teammates together to land the fourth seed in the Western Conference. Westbrook also became the Thunder’s all-time leader in total points scored and led the NBA in assists per game this past season.) |
| May 24, 2018 | Paul George | All-NBA Third Team (Note: In his first season in Oklahoma City, Paul George made his 4th career All-NBA team by averaging 21.9 points (the third most in his career) while shooting 40.1 percent from 3-point range (the second-best mark in his career). George made more three pointers in 2017-18 (244) than any other season in his career, while also providing his impressive, high-IQ defense. Finishing 2nd in the NBA in steals helped him receive 22 First Team votes and finishing 12th in voting totals for the All-Defensive Team.) |

== Transactions ==
=== Overview ===
Players Added

Via draft

- Terrance Ferguson

Via trade

- Carmelo Anthony
- Paul George

Via free agency

- PJ Dozier
- Raymond Felton
- Daniel Hamilton
- Dakari Johnson
- Patrick Patterson
Players Lost

Via trade

- Enes Kanter
- Doug McDermott
- Victor Oladipo
- Domantas Sabonis

Via free agency

- Norris Cole
- Taj Gibson

Waived

- Semaj Christon

=== Trades ===
| July 6, 2017 | To Oklahoma City Thunder Paul George | To Indiana Pacers Victor Oladipo; Domantas Sabonis |
| September 25, 2017 | To Oklahoma City Thunder Carmelo Anthony | To New York Knicks Doug McDermott; Enes Kanter; 2018 second-round pick |

=== Free agency ===
==== Re-signed ====
| Date | Player | Contract |
|---|---|---|
| July 14, 2017 | Andre Roberson | Multi-Year Extension |
| July 21, 2017 | Nick Collison | Standard |
| September 29, 2017 | Russell Westbrook | Multi-Year Extension |

==== Additions ====
| Date | Player | Contract | Former team |
|---|---|---|---|
| July 10, 2017 | Raymond Felton | Standard | Los Angeles Clippers |
| July 10, 2017 | Patrick Patterson | Standard | Toronto Raptors |
| July 22, 2017 | Dakari Johnson | Standard | Oklahoma City Blue (D-League) |
| August 3, 2017 | Daniel Hamilton | Two-Way | Oklahoma City Blue (D-League) |
| October 17, 2017 | PJ Dozier | Two-Way | South Carolina (NCAA) |
In-Season Additions
| March 3, 2018 | Corey Brewer | Standard | Los Angeles Lakers |

==== Subtractions ====
| Date | Player | Reason left | New team |
|---|---|---|---|
| July 10, 2017 | Taj Gibson | Free Agent | Minnesota Timberwolves |
| August 15, 2017 | Norris Cole | Free Agent | (Israel) Maccabi Tel Aviv |
| October 14, 2017 | Semaj Christon | Waived | (China) Guangzhou Long-Lions |
