= Josh Huestis =

American basketball player (born 1991)

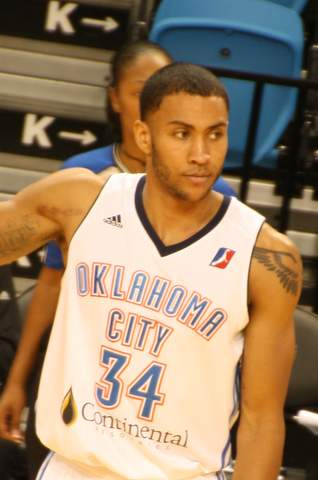
- Huestis with the Oklahoma City Blue in 2016

Personal information
- Born: December 19, 1991 (age 34) Webster, Texas, U.S.
- Listed height: 6 ft 7 in (2.01 m)
- Listed weight: 230 lb (104 kg)

Career information
- High school: C. M. Russell (Great Falls, Montana)
- College: Stanford (2010–2014)
- NBA draft: 2014: 1st round, 29th overall pick
- Drafted by: Oklahoma City Thunder
- Playing career: 2014–2022
- Position: Small forward / power forward
- Number: 34

Career history
- 2014–2015: Oklahoma City Blue
- 2015–2018: Oklahoma City Thunder
- 2015–2017: →Oklahoma City Blue
- 2018–2019: Austin Spurs
- 2019–2020: Bayern Munich
- 2021: Rio Grande Valley Vipers
- 2021–2022: Cleveland Charge

Career highlights
- 2× Pac-12 All-Defensive Team (2013, 2014)
- Stats at NBA.com
- Stats at Basketball Reference

Joshua Sutton Huestis (born December 19, 1991) is an American former professional basketball player who played for the Oklahoma City Thunder of the National Basketball Association (NBA). He played college basketball for Stanford University.

== Early life ==
Considered a three-star recruit by ESPN.com, Huestis was listed as the No. 48 power forward in the nation in 2010. Huestis attended Charles M. Russell High School in Great Falls, MT.

== College career ==
Huestis spent four seasons at Stanford and averaged 7.5 points, 6.2 rebounds and 1.4 blocks in 135 career games. During both his junior and senior seasons, Huestis was named to the Pac-12 Defensive Team and at the conclusion of his sophomore season, he received Pac-12 Defensive Team Honorable Mention honors. Huestis was 2014 Pac-12 Defensive Player of the Year. In 2013–14, Huestis scored in double-figures on 19 occasions while leading Stanford in rebounding (8.2 rpg) and blocks (1.9 bpg). He concluded his collegiate career as the all-time leading shot blocker in Cardinal history.

== Professional career ==
=== Oklahoma City Blue (2014–2015) ===
On June 26, 2014, Huestis was selected with the 29th overall pick in the 2014 NBA draft by the Oklahoma City Thunder. He later joined the Thunder for the 2014 NBA Summer League. On November 4, 2014, he was acquired by the Oklahoma City Blue of the NBA Development League. On November 14, he made his professional debut in a 111–105 loss to the Maine Red Claws, recording 10 points, nine rebounds and two assists in 37 minutes. In 46 games for the Blue in 2014–15, he averaged 10.2 points, 5.6 rebounds, 1.1 assists and 1.5 blocks per game. He would not play a single game for the Thunder that season.

=== Oklahoma City Thunder (2015–2018) ===
On July 30, 2015, Huestis signed with the Thunder. On March 24, 2016, he made his NBA debut in a 113–91 win over the Utah Jazz, recording three points in five minutes off the bench. On April 16, Huestis made his debut in the playoffs, recording one rebound in eight minutes off the bench in a Game 1 victory over the Dallas Mavericks.

During his rookie and sophomore seasons, Huestis received multiple assignments to the Oklahoma City Blue. He was one of the first domestic draft-and-stash prospects, playing for the Blue instead of heading overseas to develop. Huestis saw a vast increase in his minutes during the 2017–18 season, playing in 69 games and becoming a regular part of the player rotation.

=== Austin Spurs (2018–2019) ===
On October 9, 2018, Huestis signed with the San Antonio Spurs, but was later waived by the Spurs on October 11. Later Huestis was reported to have signed with their G League affiliate the Austin Spurs on October 17. On October 22, Huestis was included in Austin's training camp roster, and on October 31, Huestis was included in Austin's opening night roster.

On December 31, 2019, the Rio Grande Valley Vipers acquired the returning right to Huestis from the Austin Spurs for Ángel Rodríguez.

=== Bayern Munich (2019–2020) ===
On July 24, 2019, Bayern Munich announced the addition of Huestis. On March 10, 2020, Bayern Munich parted ways with Huestis.

=== Cleveland Charge (2021–2022) ===
On October 23, 2021, Huestis signed with the Cleveland Charge.

== NBA career statistics ==
Legend
GP	Games played	GS	Games started	MPG	Minutes per game
FG%	Field goal percentage	3P%	3-point field goal percentage	FT%	Free throw percentage
RPG	Rebounds per game	APG	Assists per game	SPG	Steals per game
BPG	Blocks per game	PPG	Points per game	**Bold**	Career high

=== Regular season ===
Year	Team	GP	GS	MPG	FG%	3P%	FT%	RPG	APG	SPG	BPG	PPG
2015–16	Oklahoma City	5	0	11.0	.417	**.667**	.000	2.0	.0	**.2**	.4	2.8
2016–17	Oklahoma City	2	0	**15.5**	**.545**	.500	.000	**4.5**	**1.5**	.0	**1.5**	**7.0**
2017–18	Oklahoma City	**69**	**10**	14.2	.330	.287	**.300**	2.3	.3	**.2**	.6	2.3
Career		76	10	14.1	.346	.312	.240	2.4	0.3	0.2	0.6	2.5

=== Playoffs ===
Year	Team	GP	GS	MPG	FG%	3P%	FT%	RPG	APG	SPG	BPG	PPG
2016	Oklahoma City	2	0	**5.1**	.333	**.500**	.000	**1.5**	.0	.0	.0	**1.5**
2018	Oklahoma City	**4**	0	4.8	**.500**	.000	**.500**	.8	.0	**.3**	**.3**	.8
Career		6	0	4.9	.400	.500	.500	1.0	.0	.2	.2	1.0

== Personal life ==
Huestis has worked on an online blog, Through the Lens. He has discussed dealing with depression and existential crises.
