= Kyle Singler =

American basketball player (born 1988)

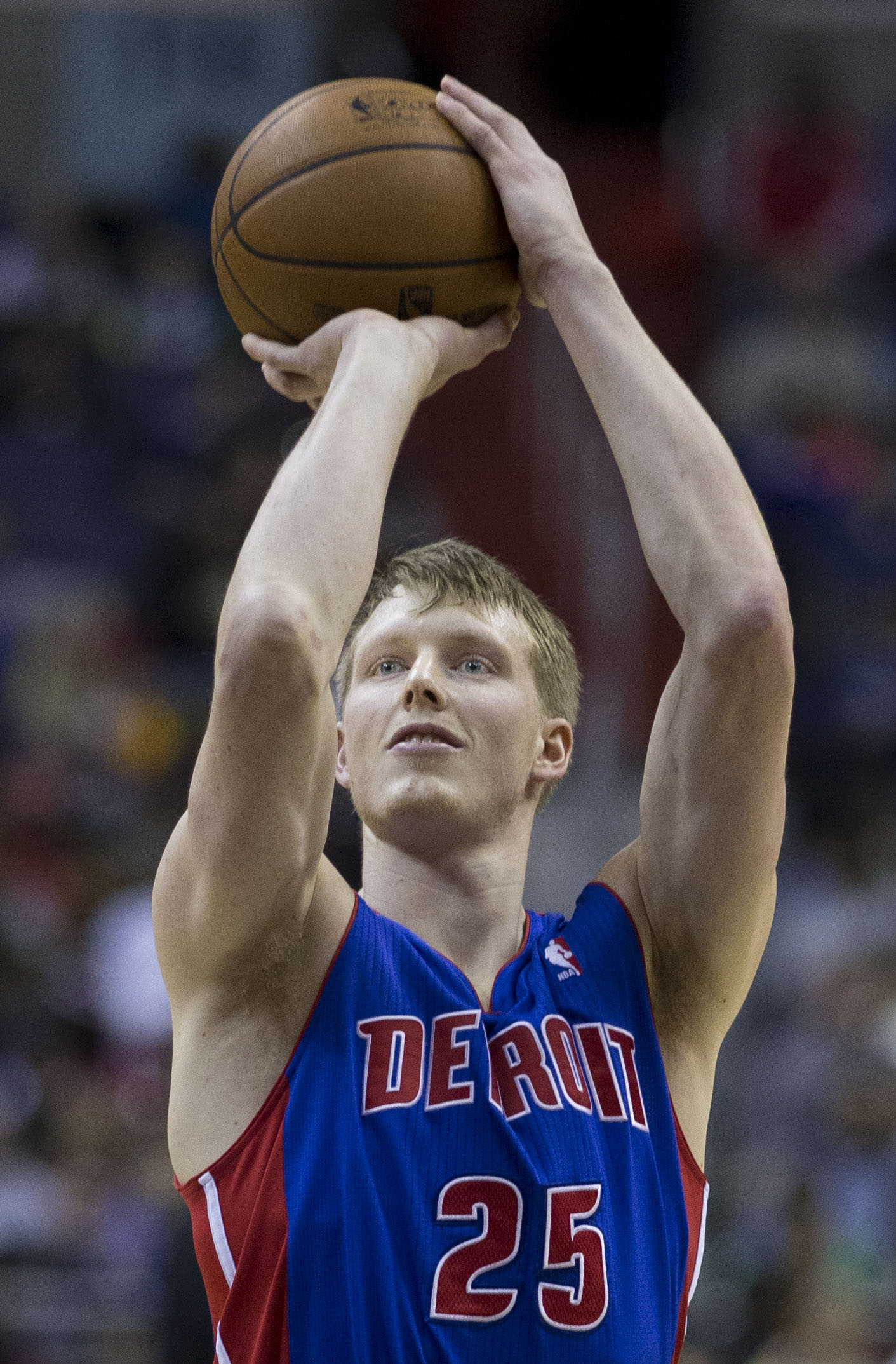
- Singler with the Detroit Pistons in 2014

Personal information
- Born: May 4, 1988 (age 38) Medford, Oregon, U.S.
- Listed height: 6 ft 8 in (2.03 m)
- Listed weight: 228 lb (103 kg)

Career information
- High school: South Medford (Medford, Oregon)
- College: Duke (2007–2011)
- NBA draft: 2011: 2nd round, 33rd overall pick
- Drafted by: Detroit Pistons
- Playing career: 2011–2019
- Position: Small forward
- Number: 25, 5, 15

Career history
- 2011: Lucentum Alicante
- 2011–2012: Real Madrid
- 2012–2015: Detroit Pistons
- 2015–2018: Oklahoma City Thunder
- 2018–2019: Obradoiro CAB
- 2019: CB Canarias

Career highlights
- NBA All-Rookie Second Team (2013); Spanish King's Cup (2012); NCAA champion (2010); NCAA Final Four Most Outstanding Player (2010); SN College Athlete of the Year (2010); Second-team All-American – NABC (2011); 2× First-team All-ACC (2010, 2011); Second-team All-ACC (2009); Third-team All-ACC (2008); ACC Rookie of the Year (2008); McDonald's All-American (2007); First-team Parade All-American (2007); Second-team Parade All-American (2006)
- Stats at NBA.com
- Stats at Basketball Reference
Medals
Men's basketball
Representing United States
FIBA Americas U18 Championship
Gold medal – first place	2006 San Antonio	Team competition

Kyle Colby Singler (born May 4, 1988) is an American former professional basketball player. Singler was a four-year starter for the Duke men's basketball team and was instrumental in their 2010 NCAA championship run, and was named the NCAA Tournament's Most Outstanding Player. In the 2011 NBA draft, the Detroit Pistons selected Singler in the second round with the overall 33rd pick. His professional career spanned from 2011 to 2019.

== High school ==
Singler attended South Medford High School in Medford, Oregon. In high school, he averaged 29.3 points per game and 10.6 rebounds per game as a senior.

In 2006, Singler played against Brandon Jennings in the championship game of The Les Schwab Invitational. Singler was also named to the 2006 U18 USA Junior National team, alongside fellow top prospects Michael Beasley, Jerryd Bayless, and 2006 star recruit Spencer Hawes. Singler is also one of eight players featured in Gunnin' for That#1 Spot, a 2008 documentary directed by Adam Yauch of the Beastie Boys which was filmed in 2006.

In October 2006, he signed a letter of intent to play college basketball at Duke University.

In 2007, Singler led South Medford to its first-ever state basketball championship, winning 58–54 over defending champion Lake Oswego and national standout Kevin Love. A year earlier, Love and Lake Oswego had defeated Singler and South Medford for the state championship.

Singler was a member of the Legends AAU team, along with future UCLA player Kevin Love, and participated in many prestigious all-American camps, including the Nike All-American Camp (Indianapolis), the Nike Peach Jam (Augusta), and the Main Event (Las Vegas).

=== Awards and honors ===
- 2006 Elite 24 Hoops Classic
- 2006 Second-team Parade All-American
- 2007 Oregon Co-Player of the Year
- 2007 First-team Parade All-American
- 2007 McDonald's All American
- 2007 Jordan Brand All-American
- 2007 Oregon Southwest Conference Player of the Year
- 2007 OSAA 6A All Tournament Team
- 2007 OSAA 6A State Champion

== College career ==
=== Freshman season (2007–2008) ===
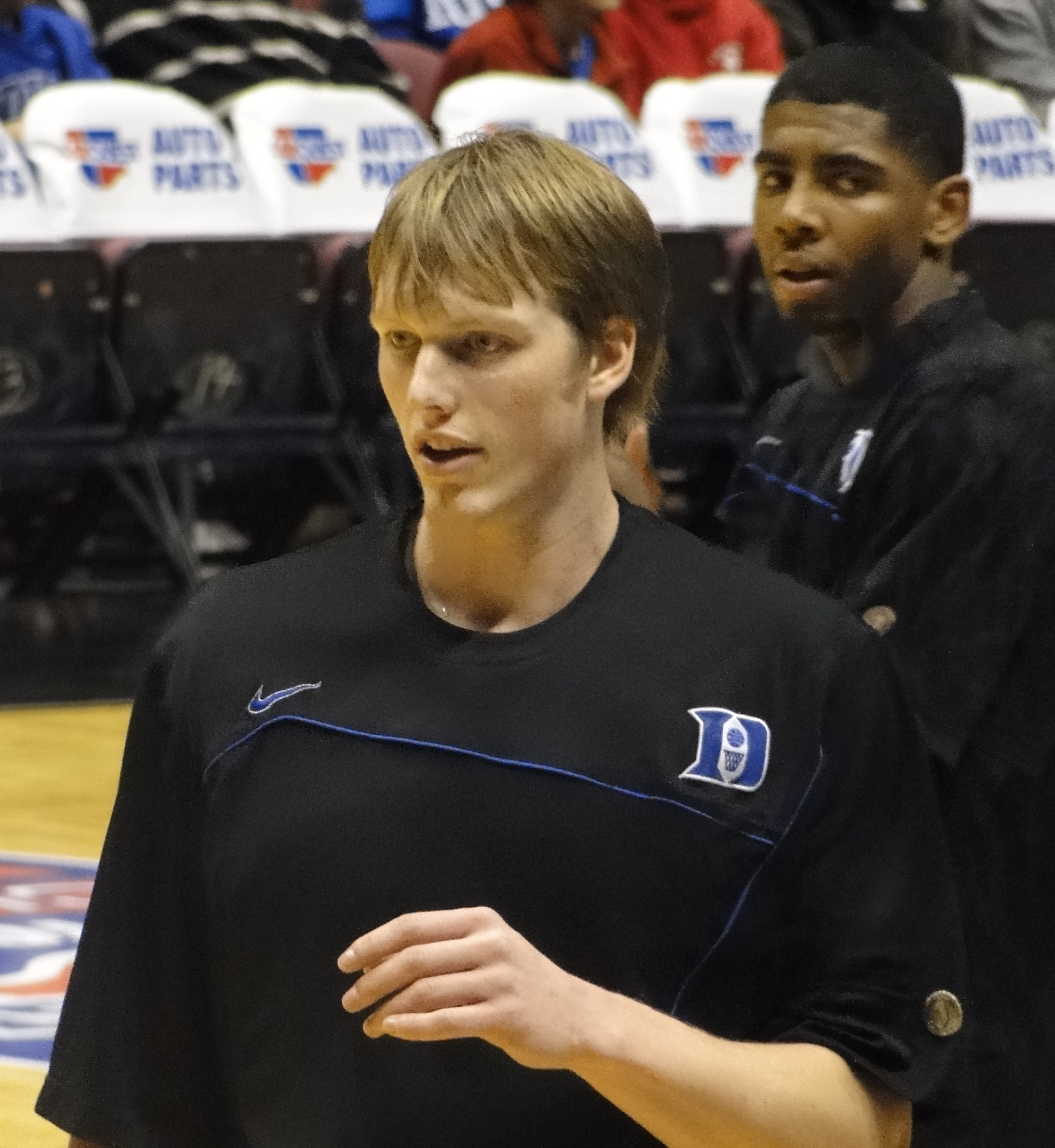
Singler during his tenure with Duke

Singler started at power forward as a freshman and finished the 2007–08 season with averages of 13.3 points per game and 5.9 rebounds per game, helping lead Duke to a 28–6 record. Singler put to rest any speculation that he might enter the 2008 NBA draft, saying:

I didn't give the NBA any thought; I know I'm not ready. I need to mature both physically and mentally. I want to get stronger and quicker, and I want to work on learning how to play the game. I'm at a great place for that.

=== Sophomore season (2008–2009) ===
In January 2009, he had a career-high 16 rebounds against Georgetown, a game in which Duke won 76–67. Singler ended the 2009 season as the top scorer for Duke. At the end of the season, Singler was averaging a team-high 16.5 points per game in 37 games played.

=== Junior season (2009–2010) ===
In February 2010, Singler scored a career-high 30 points against Georgia Tech, hitting a career-high 8 three-pointers in 10 attempts. In the ACC Tournament Final (playing Georgia Tech again), he hit a career-high 14 free throws.

On March 28, 2010, in an Elite Eight NCAA game, as Duke beat Baylor and advanced to the Final Four, Singler (667 points), Jon Scheyer (690 points), and Nolan Smith (628 points) became the second trio in the history of the school to score at least 600 points each in the same season. Jason Williams, Carlos Boozer, and Mike Dunleavy Jr. first accomplished that feat for Duke in 2001–02. Singler scored 19 points in the national championship game to reach 707 for the season, joining Scheyer (728) as the two became the second duo in Duke history to score over 700 points each in one season, following in the footsteps of Jason Williams (841) and Shane Battier (778), who did so for Duke's 2001 national championship team.

Through the 2009–10 season, Singler was also 6th on Duke's all-time list in offensive rebounds (272), and 7th in defensive rebounds (490). For the season, he averaged 17.7 points and 7.0 rebounds per game. He was 3rd in the ACC in 3-point field goal percentage (.399), 4th in scoring, 3-point field goals made (2.1 per game; his 8 against Georgia Tech were the most in the ACC in a single game for the season), and minutes (35.9 per game), and 7th in free throw percentage (.798).

Singler was instrumental in Duke winning its fourth national championship; he was named NCAA Final Four Most Outstanding Player after averaging 20.0 points, 9.0 rebounds and 3.5 assists per game in wins over West Virginia and Butler. Scheyer called him "the toughest player I've ever played with."

=== Senior season (2010–2011) ===
Following the national championship, Singler considered entering the 2010 NBA draft, but ultimately decided to return for his senior season at Duke. Singler was named the pre-season Atlantic Coast Conference player of the year, pre-season first team All-ACC, and was named a pre-season first team All-American. On November 27, 2010, Singler tied his career-high 30 points against his brother E. J. Singler and the Oregon Ducks. Singler was also voted to the Atlantic Coast Conference first team. For the 2010–2011 season, Singler averaged 16.9 points, 6.8 rebounds, and 1.6 assists in 34.8 minutes per game for the Blue Devils. The Blue Devils were eliminated in the Sweet 16 in the tournament against the Arizona Wildcats by the score of 93–77. Singler had 18 points in the defeat.

=== Awards and honors ===
- 4th-leading scorer in Duke history (2,392 points)
- NABC All-American Second Team (2011)
- NCAA champion (2010)
- NCAA basketball tournament Most Outstanding Player (2010)
- Sporting News College Athlete of the Year (2010)
- Sporting News All-American Fifth Team (2010)
- NCAA Final Four All-Tournament Team (2010)
- ACC tournament MVP (2010)
- 2x All-ACC First Team (2010–2011)
- 3x ACC All-Tournament First Team (2009–2011)
- All-ACC Second Team (2009)
- ACC Rookie of the Year (2008)
- All-ACC Third Team (2008)
- ACC All-Freshman Team (2008)
- Maui Invitational All-Tournament Team (2008)
- Maui Invitational MVP (2008)

== Professional career ==
=== Lucentum Alicante (2011) ===
Singler was selected with the 33rd overall pick in the 2011 NBA draft by the Detroit Pistons. On August 23, 2011, he signed with CB Lucentum Alicante of the Liga ACB. The contract had an NBA out-clause for when the NBA lockout ended. In his Liga ACB debut, he won the MVP of the first match day with 23 points, 4 rebounds and 3 assists. Following the conclusion of the lockout, Singler exercised his option to leave the club. In 10 appearances with Alicante, Singler helped them win 7 games while averaging 14.4 points, 3.4 rebounds and 1.1 steals.

=== Real Madrid (2011–2012) ===
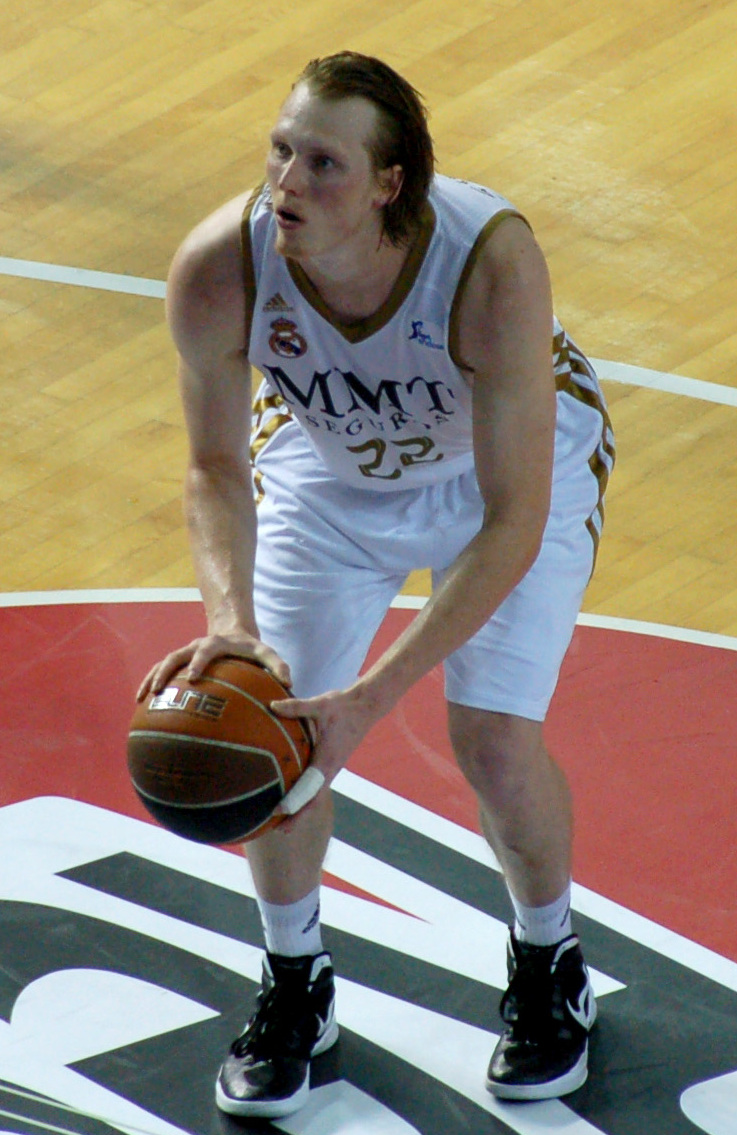
Singler with Real Madrid in 2012

Singler chose to join Real Madrid on November 30, 2011, after the two clubs agreed on a transfer fee. He went on to help Real Madrid defeat Barcelona to win the 2012 Spanish King's Cup.

=== Detroit Pistons (2012–2015) ===
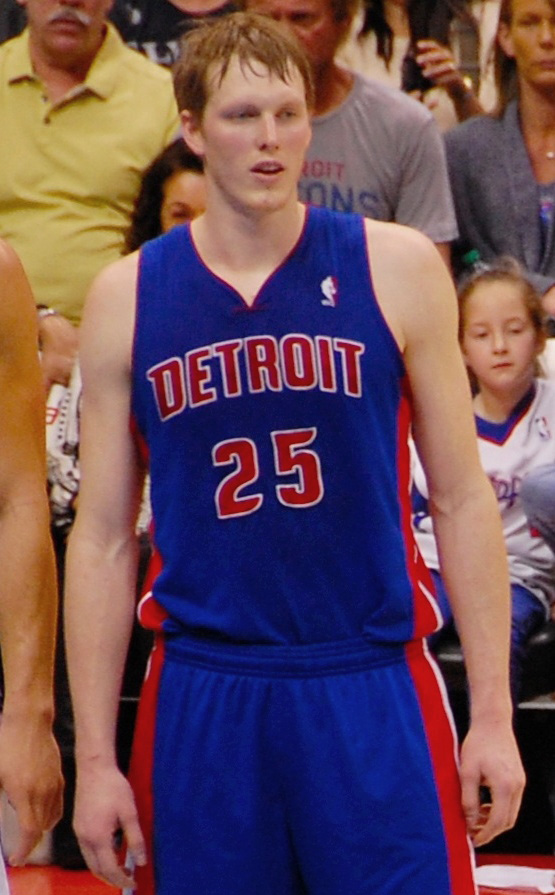
Singler with the Detroit Pistons in 2013

On July 11, 2012, Singler signed with the Detroit Pistons. He went on to earn All-Rookie second team honors in 2012–13, averaging 8.8 points and 4.0 rebounds after playing in all 82 games.

On November 22, 2013, Singler scored a career-high 22 points in an 89–96 loss to the Atlanta Hawks. Singler again played in all 82 games (including 36 starts) for Detroit during the 2013–14 NBA season, averaging 9.6 points and 3.7 rebounds.

Singler played in 58 games for the Pistons during the 2014–15 season, recording averages of 7.1 points, 2.6 rebounds, and 1.2 assists.

=== Oklahoma City Thunder (2015–2018) ===
On February 19, 2015, Singler was traded to the Oklahoma City Thunder in a three-team deal that also involved the Utah Jazz. He made 26 appearances (18 starts) for Oklahoma City down the stretch, averaging 3.7 points and 2.1 rebounds.

On July 9, 2015, Singler re-signed with the Thunder on a multi–year contract. For much of the first two months of the 2015–16 season, he was a seldom-used, third-string forward off the bench. Between November 24 and New Year's Eve, Singler sat out eight games and twice played less than 60 seconds. Over the team's first 32 games of the season, Singler had made just six of his 31 three-point shots. He began to receive more game time in mid-January, and on January 20 against the Charlotte Hornets, Singler scored a season-high 11 points and hit 3–of–3 from three-point range. In 68 appearances for the team, he posted averages of 3.4 points and 2.1 rebounds.

On April 9, 2017, Singler recorded eight points, four rebounds, three assists, and three steals during Russell Westbrook's record-breaking 50-point triple-double game (Westbrook became the NBA's all-time leader in single season triple-doubles), a 106–105 win over the Denver Nuggets. Singler made 32 appearances (including two starts) for Oklahoma City during the 2016–17 season, averaging 2.8 points and 1.5 rebounds.

In the 2017–18 season, Singler made 12 appearances for the Thunder as a reserve, recording averages of 1.9 points, 0.8 rebounds, and 0.2 assists. On August 30, 2018, Singler was waived by the Thunder using the stretch provision with two years remaining on his contract, meaning his salary stayed on the Thunder's payroll until 2022, long after his professional career ended in 2019.

=== Obradoiro (2018–2019) ===
On September 30, 2018, Singler returned to Spain for a second stint, signing a one-year deal with Monbus Obradoiro.

=== Tenerife (2019) ===
On June 27, 2019, Singler signed a one-year deal with Iberostar Tenerife. On October 17, Singler announced his retirement from professional basketball for personal reasons.

== Career statistics ==
Legend
GP	Games played	GS	Games started	MPG	Minutes per game
FG%	Field goal percentage	3P%	3-point field goal percentage	FT%	Free throw percentage
RPG	Rebounds per game	APG	Assists per game	SPG	Steals per game
BPG	Blocks per game	PPG	Points per game	**Bold**	Career high
*	Led the league

=== NBA ===
==== Regular season ====
Year	Team	GP	GS	MPG	FG%	3P%	FT%	RPG	APG	SPG	BPG	PPG
2012–13	Detroit	**82***	**74**	28.0	.428	.350	.806	**4.0**	.9	**.7**	**.5**	8.8
2013–14	Detroit	**82**	36	**28.5**	**.447**	.382	**.826**	3.7	.9	**.7**	**.5**	**9.6**
2014–15	Detroit	54	40	23.8	.400	**.406**	.806	2.6	**1.2**	.6	.3	7.1
2014–15	Oklahoma City	26	18	17.5	.333	.370	.688	2.1	.7	.5	.3	3.7
2015–16	Oklahoma City	77	9	14.9	.389	.309	.659	2.1	.4	.4	.1	3.4
2016–17	Oklahoma City	32	2	12.0	.410	.189	.765	1.5	.3	.2	.2	2.8
2017–18	Oklahoma City	12	0	4.9	.333	.400	.538	.8	.2	.1	.0	1.9
Career		356	172	21.9	.418	.362	.786	2.9	.8	.6	.3	6.5

==== Playoffs ====
Year	Team	GP	GS	MPG	FG%	3P%	FT%	RPG	APG	SPG	BPG	PPG
2016	Oklahoma City	**6**	0	8.4	**.333**	**.500**	.000	**1.2**	.0	**.2**	.0	**1.3**
2017	Oklahoma City	1	0	**10.4**	.000	.000	.000	1.0	.0	.0	.0	.0
Career		7	0	8.7	.300	.500	.000	1.1	.0	.1	.0	1.1

=== EuroLeague ===
Year	Team	GP	GS	MPG	FG%	3P%	FT%	RPG	APG	SPG	BPG	PPG
2011–12	Real Madrid	8	7	23.1	.463	.385	.625	4.3	0.8	0.4	0.4	8.1

=== Basketball Champions League ===
Year	Team	GP	GS	MPG	FG%	3P%	FT%	RPG	APG	SPG	BPG	PPG
2019-20	CB Canarias	1	1	14.1	.333	.000	.000	3.0	1.0	0.0	0.0	2.0

=== Liga Endesa ===
Year	Team	GP	GS	MPG	FG%	3P%	FT%	RPG	APG	SPG	BPG	PPG
2011–12	Alicante	10	10	31.1	.445	.400	.744	3.4	0.9	1.1	0.2	14.4
2011–12	Real Madrid	36	29	20.3	.507	.431	.750	2.4	0.9	0.5	0.3	8.0
2018–19	Obradoiro	31	25	21.8	.456	.241	.781	3.7	1.1	0.5	0.3	10.2
2019–20	CB Canarias	2	0	20.4	.786	.500	.333	2.5	0.5	1.5	0.0	12.0

=== Copa del Rey ===
Year	Team	GP	GS	MPG	FG%	3P%	FT%	RPG	APG	SPG	BPG	PPG
2011-12	Real Madrid	3	3	16.5	.643	.750	.000	2.0	1.0	0.7	0.7	7.0

=== College ===
Year	Team	GP	GS	MPG	FG%	3P%	FT%	RPG	APG	SPG	BPG	PPG
2007–08	Duke	34	34	28.6	**.457**	.340	.774	5.8	1.4	1.1	.7	13.3
2008–09	Duke	37	36	32.2	.441	.383	.713	**7.7**	**2.4**	**1.5**	**1.0**	16.5
2009–10	Duke	**40**	**40**	**35.9**	.415	**.399**	.798	7.0	**2.4**	1.0	.8	**17.7**
2010–11	Duke	37	37	34.8	.430	.321	**.806**	6.8	1.6	.9	.3	16.9
Career		148	147	33.0	.433	.363	.773	6.9	2.0	1.1	.7	16.2

== See also ==
- 2006 high school boys basketball All-Americans
- 2009–10 Duke Blue Devils men's basketball team
- 2010 NCAA Men's Basketball All-Americans
- List of NCAA Division I men's basketball players with 145 games played
- List of NCAA Division I men's basketball players with 2,000 points and 1,000 rebounds
