= 2015–16 Oklahoma City Thunder season =

NBA professional basketball team season

- Division champions
- Head coach: Billy Donovan
- General manager: Sam Presti
- Owners: Professional Basketball Club LLC
- Arena: Chesapeake Energy Arena

Results
- Record: 55–27 (.671)
- Place: Division: 1st (Northwest); Conference: 3rd (Western)
- Playoff finish: Western Conference Finals (lost to Warriors 3–4)
- Stats at Basketball Reference

Local media
- Television: Fox Sports Oklahoma
- Radio: KWPN; WWLS-FM

The 2015–16 Oklahoma City Thunder season was the 8th season of the franchise in Oklahoma City and the 50th in the National Basketball Association (NBA), and the first under head coach Billy Donovan. After coming just short of making the playoffs the previous season, the Thunder won the Northwest Division and clinched the third seed in the Western Conference. In the playoffs, the Thunder defeated the Dallas Mavericks in five games in the First Round, and the San Antonio Spurs in six games in the Semifinals (which was also Tim Duncan's final NBA game) before reaching the Western Conference finals for the fourth time in a span of six seasons, but were eliminated by the defending NBA champion Golden State Warriors in seven games after leading the series 3–1.

After almost pulling what would've been one of the biggest upsets in professional sports history over the 73–9 Warriors, the Thunder missed out on what would’ve been their first Finals appearance since 2012. The Warriors would go on to lose in seven games against the Cleveland Cavaliers in the NBA Finals after they too led the series 3–1. After the season, Kevin Durant controversially left the team in free agency for the Golden State Warriors.

After this season, the Thunder did not reach the Western Conference Finals again until 2025, where they would win the conference and the NBA Championship.

== Previous season ==
The Thunder finished the 2014–15 season 45–37 to finish in second place in the Northwest Division, ninth in the Western Conference and failed to qualify for the playoffs. This marks the second season that the Thunder failed to qualify for the playoffs since moving to Oklahoma City. Following the season, head coach Scott Brooks was fired on April 22, 2015.

== Offseason ==
=== Draft picks ===
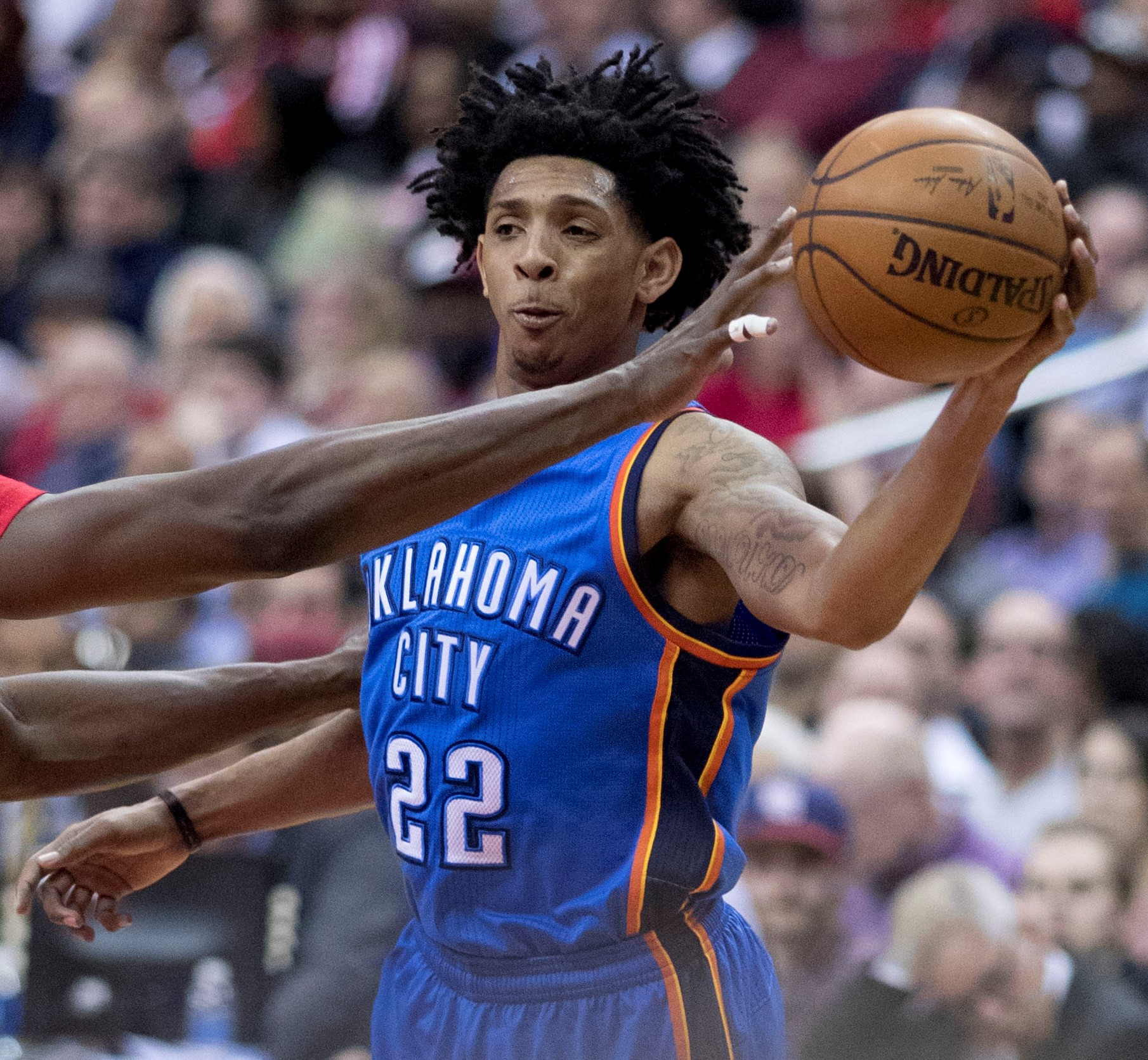
Cameron Payne was selected 14th overall by the Oklahoma City Thunder.

Round	Pick	Player	Position	Nationality	College
1	14	Cameron Payne	PG	United States	Murray State
2	48	Dakari Johnson	C	United States	Kentucky

The Thunder had their own first-round pick and second-round pick entering the draft. The Thunder ended 2015 NBA draft night with Murray State guard Cameron Payne and Kentucky center Dakari Johnson.

=== Trades ===
On June 25, the Thunder traded Jeremy Lamb to the Charlotte Hornets in exchange for Luke Ridnour and a future 2016 second-round pick in an effort for payroll relief. Lamb was originally acquired in the James Harden trade back in 2012. Five days later, Ridnour was traded again along with cash considerations to the Toronto Raptors in exchange for the draft rights to Tomislav Zubcic and a trade exception.

On July 14, the Thunder traded Perry Jones, a 2019 second-round pick, and cash considerations to the Boston Celtics in exchange for a protected 2018 second-round pick and a trade exception in another effort for payroll relief. By trading Jones' $2 million, the Thunder cleared $5 million in luxury tax payments.

=== Free agency ===
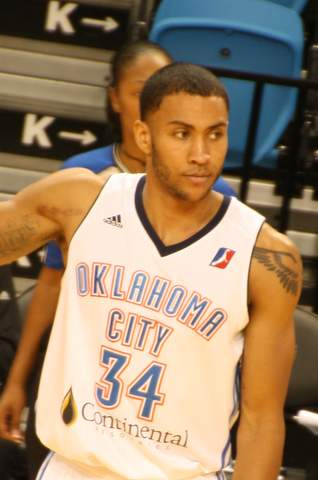
Josh Huestis was signed to a rookie deal after being the first "domestic draft-and-stash."

For this offseason, free agency began on July 1, 2015, while the July moratorium ended on July 7. Enes Kanter and Kyle Singler were set to hit restricted free agency. On July 1, it was reported that Kyle Singler agreed to a five-year, nearly $25 million deal to stay with the Thunder, which he later signed on July 9. On July 9, Enes Kanter signed a four-year, $70 million deal with the Portland Trail Blazers. However, on July 12, the Thunder exercised its right of first refusal and matched the Trail Blazer's offer sheet to re-sign Kanter.

On July 30, Josh Huestis signed a rookie deal with the Thunder. Huestis was originally selected 29th overall in the 2014 NBA draft but became the first "domestic draft-and-stash" after working out a predraft arrangement with the Thunder to not sign his guaranteed rookie-scale deal. Huestis spent the 2014-15 NBA season with the Oklahoma City Blue.

=== Front office and coaching changes ===
After the Thunder failed to make the 2015 NBA Playoffs, head coach Scott Brooks was fired on April 22, 2015, after seven seasons with the team. Brooks was named head coach of the Thunder on April 15, 2009, taking over for P.J. Carlesimo after serving as interim head coach during the 2008–09 season. Brooks accumulated a 338-207 (.620) record, named the 2009–10 season NBA Coach of the Year, made three appearances in the Western Conference finals (2011, 2012, 2014) and an appearance in the 2012 NBA Finals.

On April 30, the Thunder hired Billy Donovan, formerly with the Florida Gators, as head coach. Donovan became the third head coach of the Thunder since moving to Oklahoma City. Donovan led the Gators to two national championships, four trips to the Final Four, and accumulated a 467-186 (.715) record.

On June 29, the Thunder announced Monty Williams, Maurice Cheeks, and Anthony Grant as assistant coaches and Billy Schmidt as quality control coach. Williams joins the Thunder after serving five seasons as the head coach of the New Orleans Pelicans leading the Pelicans to a playoff appearance in the 2014–15 season. Cheeks re-joined the Thunder after serving as the head coach of the Detroit Pistons during the 2013–14 season. Grant joins the Thunder after serving six seasons as the head coach of the Alabama Crimson Tide. Schmidt joins the Thunder after serving last season under Billy Donovan at the University of Florida.

== Roster ==
2015–16 Oklahoma City Thunder roster
Players

Pos.	No.	Player	Height	Weight	DOB	From
C	12	Steven Adams	6 ft 11 in (2.11 m)	255 lb (116 kg)	1993-07-20	Pittsburgh
PF	4	Nick Collison	6 ft 10 in (2.08 m)	255 lb (116 kg)	1980-10-26	Kansas
SF	35	Kevin Durant	6 ft 10 in (2.08 m)	240 lb (109 kg)	1988-09-29	Texas
SG	6	Randy Foye	6 ft 4 in (1.93 m)	213 lb (97 kg)	1983-09-24	Villanova
SF	34	Josh Huestis	6 ft 7 in (2.01 m)	230 lb (104 kg)	1991-12-19	Stanford
PF	9	Serge Ibaka	7 ft 0 in (2.13 m)	245 lb (111 kg)	1989-09-18	Spain
PF/C	11	Enes Kanter	6 ft 11 in (2.11 m)	260 lb (118 kg)	1992-05-20	Turkey
C	33	Mitch McGary	6 ft 10 in (2.08 m)	255 lb (116 kg)	1992-06-06	Michigan
C	13	Nazr Mohammed	6 ft 10 in (2.08 m)	250 lb (113 kg)	1977-09-05	Kentucky
SG	2	Anthony Morrow	6 ft 5 in (1.96 m)	210 lb (95 kg)	1985-09-27	Georgia Tech
PG	22	Cameron Payne	6 ft 3 in (1.91 m)	185 lb (84 kg)	1994-08-08	Murray State
SG	21	André Roberson	6 ft 7 in (2.01 m)	210 lb (95 kg)	1991-12-04	Colorado
SF	5	Kyle Singler	6 ft 8 in (2.03 m)	228 lb (103 kg)	1988-05-04	Duke
SG	3	Dion Waiters	6 ft 4 in (1.93 m)	220 lb (100 kg)	1991-12-10	Syracuse
PG	0	Russell Westbrook	6 ft 3 in (1.91 m)	200 lb (91 kg)	1988-11-12	UCLA

Coaches
Head coach
- Billy Donovan
Assistant(s)
- Mark Bryant
- Maurice Cheeks
- Anthony Grant
- Darko Rajaković
- Monty Williams (associate HC)

Legend
- (DP) Unsigned draft pick
- (FA) Free agent
- (S) Suspended
- (DL) On assignment to D-League affiliate
- Injured

Roster
Updated: April 2, 2016

=== Roster notes ===
- Enes Kanter changed his jersey number to #11 while Josh Huestis chose Kanter's former jersey number #34.

=== Salaries ===
Player	Salary
Kevin Durant	$20,158,622
Russell Westbrook	$16,744,218
Enes Kanter	$16,400,000
Serge Ibaka	$12,350,000
Dion Waiters	$5,138,430
Kyle Singler	$5,000,000
Nick Collison	$3,750,000
Anthony Morrow	$3,344,000
Randy Foye	$3,270,000
Steven Adams	$2,279,040
Cameron Payne	$2,021,520
Mitch McGary	$1,463,040
Andre Roberson	$1,210,800
Josh Huestis	$1,140,240
Nazr Mohammed	$352,750
Total	$94,622,660

All 2015-16 salaries.
^{‡} Waived with guaranteed money

== Staff ==
Oklahoma City Thunder staff
Front Office: Chairman – Clay Bennett; Executive Vice President & General Manager – Sam Presti; Assistant General Manager – Troy Weaver; Assistant General Manager – Michael Winger	Coaches: Head coach – Billy Donovan; Associate Head Coach – Monty Williams; Assistant coach – Mark Bryant; Assistant coach – Maurice Cheeks; Assistant coach – Anthony Grant; Assistant coach – Darko Rajaković; Quality Control Coach – Billy Schmidt; Trainer – Joe Sharpe; → Staff

== Standings ==
=== Conference ===
Western Conference
#	Team	W	L	PCT	GB	GP
1	z – Golden State Warriors *	73	9	.890	–	82
2	y – San Antonio Spurs *	67	15	.817	6.0	82
3	y – Oklahoma City Thunder *	55	27	.671	18.0	82
4	x – Los Angeles Clippers	53	29	.646	20.0	82
5	x – Portland Trail Blazers	44	38	.537	29.0	82
6	x – Dallas Mavericks	42	40	.512	31.0	82
7	x – Memphis Grizzlies	42	40	.512	31.0	82
8	x – Houston Rockets	41	41	.500	32.0	82
9	e – Utah Jazz	40	42	.488	33.0	82
10	e – Sacramento Kings	33	49	.402	40.0	82
11	e – Denver Nuggets	33	49	.402	40.0	82
12	e – New Orleans Pelicans	30	52	.366	43.0	82
13	e – Minnesota Timberwolves	29	53	.354	44.0	82
14	e – Phoenix Suns	23	59	.280	50.0	82
15	e – Los Angeles Lakers	17	65	.207	56.0	82

=== Division ===
Northwest Division	W	L	PCT	GB	Home	Road	Div	GP
y – Oklahoma City Thunder	55	27	.671	–	32‍–‍9	23‍–‍18	13–3	82
x – Portland Trail Blazers	44	38	.537	11.0	28‍–‍13	16‍–‍25	11–5	82
e – Utah Jazz	40	42	.488	15.0	24‍–‍17	16‍–‍25	8–8	82
e – Denver Nuggets	33	49	.402	22.0	18‍–‍23	15‍–‍26	4–12	82
e – Minnesota Timberwolves	29	53	.354	26.0	14‍–‍27	15‍–‍26	4–12	82

== Game log ==
=== Preseason ===
2015 pre-season game log
Total: 5–1 (home: 4–0; road: 2–1)
Pre-season: 5–1 (home: 3–0; road: 2–1)

Game	Date	Team	Score	High points	High rebounds	High assists	Location Attendance	Record
1	October 7	@ Minnesota	W 122–99	Serge Ibaka (18)	Russell Westbrook (8)	Russell Westbrook (13)	Target Center; 8,601	1–0
2	October 9	Fenerbahçe	W 111–81	Dion Waiters (19)	Steven Adams (8)	Durant & Westbrook (5)	Chesapeake Energy Arena; N/A	2–0
3	October 13	Dallas	W 100–88	Russell Westbrook (19)	Enes Kanter (11)	D. J. Augustin (8)	BOK Center; 17,978	3–0
4	October 16	@ Memphis	L 78–94	Anthony Morrow (16)	Roberson & Adams (7)	Cameron Payne (6)	FedEx Forum; 14,996	3–1
5	October 18	Denver	W 111–98	Kevin Durant (23)	Enes Kanter (11)	Russell Westbrook (12)	Chesapeake Energy Arena; N/A	4–1
6	October 20	@ Utah	W 113–102	Kevin Durant (29)	Adams & Westbrook (10)	Russell Westbrook (10)	Energy Solutions Arena; 17,806	5–1

2015–16 pre-season schedule

=== Regular season ===
2015–16 game log
Total: 55–27 (home: 32–9; road: 23–18)
October: 2–0 (home: 1–0; road: 1–0)

Game	Date	Team	Score	High points	High rebounds	High assists	Location Attendance	Record
1	October 28	San Antonio	W 112–106	Russell Westbrook (33)	Enes Kanter (16)	Russell Westbrook (10)	Chesapeake Energy Arena; 18,203	1–0
2	October 30	@ Orlando	W 139–136 (2OT)	Russell Westbrook (48)	Durant & Ibaka (12)	Russell Westbrook (8)	Amway Center; 18,846	2–0

November : 9–7 (home: 7–3; road: 2–4)

Game	Date	Team	Score	High points	High rebounds	High assists	Location Attendance	Record
3	November 1	Denver	W 117–93	Kevin Durant (25)	Enes Kanter (10)	Russell Westbrook (8)	Chesapeake Energy Arena; 18,203	3–0
4	November 2	@ Houston	L 105–110	Kevin Durant (29)	Serge Ibaka (14)	Russell Westbrook (11)	Toyota Center; 17,224	3–1
5	November 4	Toronto	L 98–103	Kevin Durant (27)	Durant & Adams (7)	Russell Westbrook (16)	Chesapeake Energy Arena; 18,203	3–2
6	November 5	@ Chicago	L 98–104	Kevin Durant (33)	Enes Kanter (8)	Russell Westbrook (10)	United Center; 21,861	3–3
7	November 8	Phoenix	W 124–103	Kevin Durant (32)	Kevin Durant (11)	Russell Westbrook (13)	Chesapeake Energy Arena; 18,203	4–3
8	November 10	@Washington	W 125–101	Dion Waiters (25)	Russell Westbrook (11)	Russell Westbrook (11)	Verizon Center; 20,356	5–3
9	November 13	Philadelphia	W 102–85	Russell Westbrook (21)	Russell Westbrook (17)	Russell Westbrook (11)	Chesapeake Energy Arena; 18,203	6–3
10	November 15	Boston	L 85–100	Russell Westbrook (27)	Serge Ibaka (10)	Russell Westbrook (5)	Chesapeake Energy Arena; 18,203	6–4
11	November 16	@ Memphis	L 114–122	Russell Westbrook (40)	Serge Ibaka (9)	Russell Westbrook (14)	FedEx Forum; 17,270	6–5
12	November 18	New Orleans	W 110–103	Russell Westbrook (43)	Enes Kanter (11)	Russell Westbrook (8)	Chesapeake Energy Arena; 18,203	7–5
13	November 20	New York	L 90–93	Russell Westbrook (34)	Enes Kanter (13)	Russell Westbrook (7)	Chesapeake Energy Arena; 18,203	7–6
14	November 22	Dallas	W 117–114	Russell Westbrook (31)	Serge Ibaka (9)	Russell Westbrook (11)	Chesapeake Energy Arena; 18,203	8–6
15	November 23	@ Utah	W 111–89	Kevin Durant (27)	Russell Westbrook (7)	Russell Westbrook (9)	Vivint Smart Home Arena; 19,911	9–6
16	November 25	Brooklyn	W 110–99	Kevin Durant (30)	Enes Kanter (9)	Russell Westbrook (13)	Chesapeake Energy Arena; 18,203	10–6
17	November 27	Detroit	W 103–87	Kevin Durant (34)	Durant & Adams (13)	Kevin Durant (5)	Chesapeake Energy Arena; 18,203	11–6
18	November 30	@ Atlanta	L 100–106	Russell Westbrook (34)	Russell Westbrook (11)	Russell Westbrook (7)	Philips Arena; 17,768	11–7

December : 12–3 (home: 8–1; road: 4–2)

Game	Date	Team	Score	High points	High rebounds	High assists	Location Attendance	Record
19	December 3	@ Miami	L 95–97	Durant & Westbrook (25)	Durant & Roberson (9)	Russell Westbrook (7)	American Airlines Arena; 19,600	11–8
20	December 6	Sacramento	W 98–95	Kevin Durant (20)	Steven Adams (12)	Russell Westbrook (10)	Chesapeake Energy Arena; 18,203	12–8
21	December 8	@ Memphis	W 125–88	Kevin Durant (32)	Kevin Durant (10)	Russell Westbrook (16)	FedEx Forum; 16,415	13–8
22	December 10	Atlanta	W 107–94	Kevin Durant (25)	Kevin Durant (12)	Durant & Westbrook (10)	Chesapeake Energy Arena; 18,203	14–8
23	December 11	@ Utah	W 94–90	Russell Westbrook (24)	Durant & Ibaka (8)	Russell Westbrook (7)	Energy Solutions Arena; 19,911	15–8
24	December 13	Utah	W 104–98 (OT)	Kevin Durant (31)	Russell Westbrook (11)	Kevin Durant (6)	Chesapeake Energy Arena; 18,203	16–8
25	December 16	Portland	W 106–90	Kevin Durant (24)	Enes Kanter (13)	Russell Westbrook (5)	Chesapeake Energy Arena; 18,203	17–8
26	December 17	@ Cleveland	L 100–104	Kevin Durant (27)	Serge Ibaka (9)	Russell Westbrook (10)	Quicken Loans Arena; 20,562	17–9
27	December 19	L.A. Lakers	W 118–78	Kevin Durant (22)	Enes Kanter (14)	Russell Westbrook (11)	Chesapeake Energy Arena; 18,203	18–9
28	December 21	@ L.A. Clippers	W 100–99	Russell Westbrook (33)	Steven Adams (11)	Durant, Westbrook (7)	Staples Center; 19,415	19–9
29	December 23	@ L.A. Lakers	W 120–85	Russell Westbrook (23)	Enes Kanter (10)	Russell Westbrook (8)	Staples Center; 18,997	20–9
30	December 25	Chicago	L 96–105	Kevin Durant (29)	Enes Kanter (11)	Russell Westbrook (8)	Chesapeake Energy Arena; 18,203	20–10
31	December 27	Denver	W 122–112	Russell Westbrook (30)	Russell Westbrook (9)	Russell Westbrook (12)	Chesapeake Energy Arena; 18,203	21–10
32	December 29	Milwaukee	W 131–123	Russell Westbrook (27)	Enes Kanter (8)	Kevin Durant (8)	Chesapeake Energy Arena; 18,203	22–10
33	December 31	Phoenix	W 110–106	Russell Westbrook (36)	Steven Adams (8)	Russell Westbrook (12)	Chesapeake Energy Arena; 18,203	23–10

January: 13–3 (home: 6–1; road: 7–2)

Game	Date	Team	Score	High points	High rebounds	High assists	Location Attendance	Record
34	January 2	@ Charlotte	W 109–90	Kevin Durant (29)	Kevin Durant (11)	Russell Westbrook (7)	Time Warner Cable Arena; 19,387	24–10
35	January 4	Sacramento	L 104–116	Serge Ibaka (25)	Steven Adams (10)	Russell Westbrook (15)	Chesapeake Energy Arena; 18,203	24–11
36	January 6	Memphis	W 112–94	Kevin Durant (26)	Kevin Durant (17)	Russell Westbrook (7)	Chesapeake Energy Arena; 18,203	25–11
37	January 8	@ L.A. Lakers	W 117–113	Russell Westbrook (36)	Russell Westbrook (12)	Russell Westbrook (7)	Staples Center; 18,997	26–11
38	January 10	@ Portland	L 110–115	Kevin Durant (28)	Steven Adams (10)	Russell Westbrook (15)	Moda Center; 19,393	26–12
39	January 12	@ Minnesota	W 101–96	Kevin Durant (30)	Serge Ibaka (8)	Russell Westbrook (11)	Target Center; 14,791	27–12
40	January 13	Dallas	W 108–89	Kevin Durant (29)	Serge Ibaka (11)	Russell Westbrook (8)	Chesapeake Energy Arena; 18,203	28–12
41	January 15	Minnesota	W 113–93	Kevin Durant (21)	Russell Westbrook (11)	Russell Westbrook (10)	Chesapeake Energy Arena; 18,203	29–12
42	January 17	Miami	W 99–74	Kevin Durant (24)	Kevin Durant & Russell Westbrook (10)	Russell Westbrook (15)	Chesapeake Energy Arena; 18,203	30–12
43	January 19	@ Denver	W 110–104	Kevin Durant (30)	Kevin Durant (12)	Russell Westbrook (12)	Pepsi Center; 12,844	31–12
44	January 20	Charlotte	W 109–95	Kevin Durant (26)	Steven Adams (10)	Russell Westbrook (15)	Chesapeake Energy Arena; 18,203	32–12
45	January 22	@ Dallas	W 109–106	Kevin Durant (24)	Nick Collison (11)	Kevin Durant & Russell Westbrook (7)	American Airlines Center; 20,284	33–12
46	January 24	@ Brooklyn	L 106–116	Kevin Durant (32)	Russell Westbrook (11)	Kevin Durant & Russell Westbrook (7)	Barclays Center; 16,019	33–13
47	January 26	@ New York	W 128–122 (OT)	Kevin Durant (44)	Serge Ibaka (17)	Russell Westbrook (10)	Madison Square Garden; 19,812	34–13
48	January 27	@ Minnesota	W 126–123	Kevin Durant (27)	Enes Kanter (10)	Russell Westbrook (15)	Target Center; 13,337	35–13
49	January 29	Houston	W 116–108	Kevin Durant (33)	Kevin Durant (12)	Russell Westbrook (14)	Chesapeake Energy Arena; 18,203	36–13

February : 6–5 (home: 3–3; road: 3–2)

Game	Date	Team	Score	High points	High rebounds	High assists	Location Attendance	Record
50	February 1	Washington	W 114–98	Kevin Durant (28)	Russell Westbrook (13)	Russell Westbrook (11)	Chesapeake Energy Arena; 18,203	37–13
51	February 3	Orlando	W 117–114	Kevin Durant (37)	Russell Westbrook (19)	Russell Westbrook (14)	Chesapeake Energy Arena; 18,203	38–13
52	February 6	@ Golden State	L 108–116	Kevin Durant (40)	Enes Kanter (15)	Russell Westbrook (12)	Oracle Arena; 19,596	38–14
53	February 8	@ Phoenix	W 122–106	Kevin Durant (32)	Russell Westbrook (8)	Russell Westbrook (8)	Talking Stick Resort Arena; 16,316	39–14
54	February 11	New Orleans	W 121–95	Durant & Westbrook (23)	Enes Kanter (12)	Russell Westbrook (10)	Chesapeake Energy Arena; 18,203	40–14
All-Star Break
55	February 19	Indiana	L 98–101	Kevin Durant (31)	Serge Ibaka (11)	Russell Westbrook (18)	Chesapeake Energy Arena; 18,203	40–15
56	February 21	Cleveland	L 92–115	Kevin Durant (26)	Adams & Westbrook (9)	Russell Westbrook (11)	Chesapeake Energy Arena; 18,203	40–16
57	February 24	@ Dallas	W 116–103	Durant & Westbrook (24)	Enes Kanter (9)	Russell Westbrook (13)	American Airlines Center; 19,805	41–16
58	February 25	@ New Orleans	L 119–123	Russell Westbrook (44)	Kevin Durant (14)	Russell Westbrook (9)	Smoothie King Center; 16,974	41–17
59	February 27	Golden State	L 118–121 (OT)	Kevin Durant (37)	Serge Ibaka (20)	Russell Westbrook (13)	Chesapeake Energy Arena; 18,203	41–18
60	February 29	@ Sacramento	W 131–116	Kevin Durant (27)	Russell Westbrook (13)	Russell Westbrook (15)	Sleep Train Arena; 17,317	42–18

March : 11–5 (home: 6–1; road: 5–4)

Game	Date	Team	Score	High points	High rebounds	High assists	Location Attendance	Record
61	March 2	@ L.A. Clippers	L 98–103	Kevin Durant (30)	Durant & Ibaka (11)	Russell Westbrook (12)	Staples Center; 19,304	42–19
62	March 3	@ Golden State	L 106–121	Kevin Durant (32)	André Roberson (11)	Kevin Durant (9)	Oracle Arena; 19,596	42–20
63	March 6	@ Milwaukee	W 104–96	Kevin Durant (32)	Enes Kanter (12)	Russell Westbrook (11)	BMO Harris Bradley Center; 16,565	43–20
64	March 9	L.A. Clippers	W 120–108	Kevin Durant (30)	Kevin Durant (12)	Russell Westbrook (20)	Chesapeake Energy Arena; 18,203	44–20
65	March 11	Minnesota	L 96–99	Kevin Durant (28)	Steven Adams (13)	Russell Westbrook (8)	Chesapeake Energy Arena; 18,203	44–21
66	March 12	@ San Antonio	L 85–93	Kevin Durant (28)	Serge Ibaka (12)	Kevin Durant (8)	AT&T Center; 18,418	44–22
67	March 14	Portland	W 128–94	Enes Kanter (26)	Russell Westbrook (10)	Russell Westbrook (16)	Chesapeake Energy Arena; 18,203	45–22
68	March 16	@ Boston	W 130–109	Kevin Durant (28)	Enes Kanter (12)	Kevin Durant (9)	TD Garden; 18,624	46–22
69	March 18	@ Philadelphia	W 111–97	Kevin Durant (26)	Russell Westbrook (15)	Russell Westbrook (10)	Wells Fargo Center; 20,388	47–22
70	March 19	@ Indiana	W 115–111	Kevin Durant (33)	Kevin Durant (12)	Russell Westbrook (11)	Bankers Life Fieldhouse; 18,165	48–22
71	March 22	Houston	W 111–107	Kevin Durant (23)	Russell Westbrook (13)	Russell Westbrook (15)	Chesapeake Energy Arena; 18,203	49–22
72	March 24	Utah	W 113–91	Kevin Durant (20)	Kevin Durant (8)	Russell Westbrook (9)	Chesapeake Energy Arena; 18,203	50–22
73	March 26	San Antonio	W 111–92	Kevin Durant (31)	Kevin Durant (10)	Russell Westbrook (8)	Chesapeake Energy Arena; 18,203	51–22
74	March 28	@ Toronto	W 119–100	Kevin Durant (34)	Russell Westbrook (11)	Russell Westbrook (12)	Air Canada Centre; 19,800	52–22
75	March 29	@ Detroit	L 82–88	Russell Westbrook (24)	Enes Kanter (14)	Russell Westbrook (6)	The Palace of Auburn Hills; 18,201	52–23
76	March 31	L.A. Clippers	W 119–117	Kevin Durant (31)	Ibaka (9)	Russell Westbrook (11)	Chesapeake Energy Arena; 18,203	53–23

April : 2–4 (home: 1–0; road: 1–4)

Game	Date	Team	Score	High points	High rebounds	High assists	Location Attendance	Record
77	April 3	@ Houston	L 110–118	Kevin Durant (33)	Russell Westbrook (12)	Russell Westbrook (8)	Toyota Center; 18,462	53–24
78	April 5	@ Denver	W 124–102	Kevin Durant (26)	Russell Westbrook (14)	Russell Westbrook (12)	Pepsi Center; 12,611	54–24
79	April 6	@ Portland	L 115–120	Enes Kanter (33)	Enes Kanter (20)	Cameron Payne (6)	Moda Center; 19,399	54–25
80	April 9	@ Sacramento	L 112–114	Kevin Durant (31)	Ibaka & Adams (8)	Russell Westbrook (10)	Sleep Train Arena; 17,317	54–26
81	April 11	L.A. Lakers	W 112–79	Kevin Durant (34)	Steven Adams (15)	Russell Westbrook (14)	Chesapeake Energy Arena; 18,203	55–26
82	April 12	@ San Antonio	L 98–102 (OT)	Adams, Waiters, Payne & Kanter (17)	Enes Kanter (16)	Cameron Payne (7)	AT&T Center; 18,765	55–27

2015–16 season schedule

=== Playoffs ===
2016 playoff game log
Total: 11–7 (home: 6–3; road: 5–4)
First Round: 4–1 (home: 2–1; road: 2–0)

Game	Date	Team	Score	High points	High rebounds	High assists	Location Attendance	Series
1	April 16	Dallas	W 108–70	Russell Westbrook (24)	Enes Kanter (11)	Russell Westbrook (11)	Chesapeake Energy Arena; 18,203	1–0
2	April 18	Dallas	L 84–85	Kevin Durant (21)	Russell Westbrook (14)	Russell Westbrook (6)	Chesapeake Energy Arena; 18,203	1–1
3	April 21	@ Dallas	W 131–102	Kevin Durant (34)	Enes Kanter (8)	Russell Westbrook (15)	American Airlines Center; 20,150	2–1
4	April 23	@ Dallas	W 119–108	Enes Kanter (28)	Roberson, Adams (8)	Russell Westbrook (15)	American Airlines Center; 20,516	3–1
5	April 25	Dallas	W 118–104	Russell Westbrook (36)	Russell Westbrook (12)	Russell Westbrook (9)	Chesapeake Energy Arena; 18,203	4–1

Conference Semifinals: 4–2 (home: 2–1; road: 2–1)

Game	Date	Team	Score	High points	High rebounds	High assists	Location Attendance	Series
1	April 30	@ San Antonio	L 92–124	Serge Ibaka (19)	Serge Ibaka (10)	Russell Westbrook (9)	AT&T Center; 18,418	0–1
2	May 2	@ San Antonio	W 98–97	Russell Westbrook (29)	Steven Adams (17)	Russell Westbrook (10)	AT&T Center; 18,418	1–1
3	May 6	San Antonio	L 96–100	Russell Westbrook (31)	Steven Adams (11)	Russell Westbrook (8)	Chesapeake Energy Arena; 18,203	1–2
4	May 8	San Antonio	W 111–97	Kevin Durant (41)	Steven Adams (10)	Russell Westbrook (15)	Chesapeake Energy Arena; 18,203	2–2
5	May 10	@ San Antonio	W 95–91	Russell Westbrook (35)	Enes Kanter (13)	Russell Westbrook (9)	AT&T Center; 18,418	3–2
6	May 12	San Antonio	W 113–99	Kevin Durant (37)	Steven Adams (11)	Russell Westbrook (12)	Chesapeake Energy Arena; 18,203	4–2

Conference Finals: 3–4 (home: 2–1; road: 1–3)

Game	Date	Team	Score	High points	High rebounds	High assists	Location Attendance	Series
1	May 16	@ Golden State	W 108–102	Russell Westbrook (27)	Steven Adams (12)	Russell Westbrook (12)	Oracle Arena; 19,596	1–0
2	May 18	@ Golden State	L 91–118	Kevin Durant (29)	Steven Adams (10)	Russell Westbrook (12)	Oracle Arena; 19,596	1–1
3	May 22	Golden State	W 133–105	Kevin Durant (33)	Enes Kanter (9)	Russell Westbrook (12)	Chesapeake Energy Arena; 18,203	2–1
4	May 24	Golden State	W 118–94	Russell Westbrook (36)	Andre Roberson (12)	Russell Westbrook (11)	Chesapeake Energy Arena; 18,203	3–1
5	May 26	@ Golden State	L 111–120	Kevin Durant (40)	Steven Adams (10)	Russell Westbrook (8)	Oracle Arena; 19,596	3–2
6	May 28	Golden State	L 101–108	Kevin Durant (29)	Ibaka, Adams & Westbrook (9)	Russell Westbrook (11)	Chesapeake Energy Arena; 18,203	3–3
7	May 30	@ Golden State	L 88–96	Kevin Durant (27)	Andre Roberson (12)	Russell Westbrook (13)	Oracle Arena; 19,596	3–4

2016 playoff schedule

== Player statistics ==
Legend
GP	Games played	GS	Games started	MPG	Minutes per game
FG%	Field goal percentage	3P%	3-point field goal percentage	FT%	Free throw percentage
RPG	Rebounds per game	APG	Assists per game	SPG	Steals per game
BPG	Blocks per game	PPG	Points per game	**Bold**	Career high

=== Regular season ===
Oklahoma City Thunder statistics
Player	GP	GS	MPG	FG%	3P%	FT%	RPG	APG	SPG	BPG	PPG
Steven Adams	80	80	25.2	61.3%	-	58.2%	6.7	0.8	0.5	1.1	8.0
D. J. Augustin ^{†}	34	0	15.3	38.0%	39.3%	76.5%	1.3	1.9	0.4	0.1	4.2
Nick Collison	59	4	11.8	45.9%	0.0%	69.7%	2.9	0.9	0.3	0.3	2.1
Kevin Durant	72	72	35.8	50.5%	38.7%	89.8%	8.2	5.0	1.0	1.2	28.2
Randy Foye ^{≠}	27	1	21.2	34.9%	30.9%	81.5	1.9	1.8	0.5	0.5	5.6
Enes Kanter	82	1	21.0	57.6%	47.6%	79.7%	8.1	0.4	0.3	0.4	12.7
Josh Huestis	5	0	11.0	41.7%	66.7%	0.0%	2.0	0.0	0.2	0.4	2.8
Serge Ibaka	78	78	32.1	47.9%	32.6%	75.2%	6.8	0.8	0.5	1.9	12.6
Mitch McGary	20	0	3.6	47.8%	0.0%	40.0%	0.9	0.2	0.1	0.1	1.3
Nazr Mohammed ^{≠}	5	0	3.8	60.0%	-	100%	0.8	0.0	0.0	0.0	1.6
Anthony Morrow	68	6	13.6	40.8%	38.7%	74.4%	0.9	0.4	0.3	0.1	5.6
Steve Novak ^{†}	7	0	3.4	50.0%	55.6%	-	0.6	0.0	0.0	0.0	2.4
Cameron Payne	57	1	12.2	41.0%	32.4%	79.2%	1.5	1.9	0.6	0.1	5.0
Andre Roberson	70	70	22.2	49.6%	31.1%	61.1%	3.6	0.7	0.8	0.6	4.8
Kyle Singler	68	2	14.4	38.9%	30.9%	65.9%	2.1	0.4	0.4	0.1	3.4
Dion Waiters	78	15	27.6	39.9%	35.8%	71.3%	2.6	2.0	1.0	0.2	9.8
Russell Westbrook	80	80	34.4	45.4%	29.6%	81.2%	7.8	10.4	2.0	0.3	23.5

Led team in statistic

After all games.
^{‡} Waived during the season
^{†} Traded during the season
^{≠} Acquired during the season

=== Playoffs ===
Oklahoma City Thunder statistics
Player	GP	GS	MPG	FG%	3P%	FT%	RPG	APG	SPG	BPG	PPG
Steven Adams	18	18	30.7	61.3%	0.0%	63.0%	9.5	0.7	0.5	0.8	10.1
Nick Collison	9	0	8.8	66.7%	-	50.0%	1.2	1.6	0.9	0.0	1.0
Kevin Durant	18	18	40.3	43.0%	28.2%	89.0%	7.1	3.3	1.0	1.0	28.4
Randy Foye	16	0	11.9	34.1%	30.8%	100%	1.3	0.8	0.1	0.2	2.5
Enes Kanter	18	0	17.9	55.1%	14.3%	84.4%	6.2	0.3	0.3	0.6	9.4
Josh Huestis	2	0	5.0	33.3%	50.0%	-	1.5	0.0	0.0	0.0	1.5
Serge Ibaka	18	18	33.4	52.1%	44.9%	75.0%	6.3	0.6	0.8	1.3	12.0
Nazr Mohammed	5	0	2.0	50.0%	-	-	0.6	0.0	0.0	0.2	0.4
Anthony Morrow	14	0	5.4	45.8%	35.7%	100%	0.1	0.1	0.1	0.0	2.6
Cameron Payne	10	0	6.4	26.9%	20.0%	50.0%	0.4	0.8	0.2	0.2	1.8
Andre Roberson	18	18	26.2	46.5%	32.4%	40.0%	5.6	0.8	1.3	1.1	5.6
Kyle Singler	6	0	8.5	33.3%	50.0%	0.0%	1.2	0.0	0.2	0.0	1.3
Dion Waiters	18	0	27.3	41.7%	37.5%	66.7%	2.6	2.3	0.6	0.2	8.4
Russell Westbrook	18	18	37.4	40.5%	32.4%	82.9%	6.9	11.0	2.6	0.1	26.0

Led team in statistic

After all games.

=== Individual game highs ===
Category	Player	Statistic
Points	Russell Westbrook	48 vs Magic on October 30, 2015
Rebounds	Serge Ibaka; Enes Kanter	20 vs Warriors on February 27, 2016; 20 vs Trail Blazers on April 6, 2016
Assists	Russell Westbrook	19 vs Clippers on March 9, 2016
Steals	Russell Westbrook	6 vs Bulls on December 25, 2015
Blocks	Serge Ibaka	7 vs 76ers on November 13, 2015
Minutes	Kevin Durant	53:32 vs Magic on October 30, 2015

Category	Player	Statistic
Field goals made	Russell Westbrook	17 vs Magic on October 30, 2015
Threes made	Kevin Durant	7 vs Warriors on February 27, 2016
Free throws made	Kevin Durant	16 vs Knicks on January 26, 2016
Double-doubles	Russell Westbrook	54
Triple-doubles	Russell Westbrook	18

== Awards and records ==
=== Awards ===
Date	Player	Award
Player of the Week
November 30, 2015	Kevin Durant (1/5)	November 23–29 Player of the Week (Note: Kevin Durant led the Thunder to an undefeated 3-0 week with averages of 30.3 points, 8.3 rebounds, 3.7 assists and 2.3 blocks.)
December 14, 2015	Kevin Durant (2/5)	December 7–13 Player of the Week (Note: Durant led the Thunder to an undefeated 4-0 week with averages of 27.3 points, 8.8 rebounds, 6.3 assists and 1.8 steals. He recorded his first triple-double of the season with 25 points, 12 rebounds and 10 assists against Atlanta.)
December 28, 2015	Russell Westbrook (1/1)	December 21–27 Player of the Week (Note: Russell Westbrook led the Thunder to a 3-1 week with averages of 28.0 points, 7.3 rebounds, 8.8 assists and 3.0 steals.)
January 18, 2016	Kevin Durant (3/5)	January 11–17 Player of the Week (Note: Durant led the Thunder to an undefeated 4-0 week with averages of 26.0 points, 8.3 rebounds and 4.3 assists.)
February 1, 2016	Kevin Durant (4/5)	January 25–31 Player of the Week (Note: Durant led the Thunder to an undefeated 3-0 week with averages of 34.7 points, 11.7 rebounds and 4.3 assists. He had a 44-point, 14-rebound outing against New York.)
March 21, 2016	Kevin Durant (5/5)	March 14–20 Player of the Week (Note: Durant led the Thunder to an undefeated 4-0 with averages of 26.8 points, 9.5 rebounds and 7.5 assists.)
Player of the Month
January 4, 2016	Kevin Durant (1/2); Russell Westbrook (1/2)	December Players of the Month (Note: Durant and Westbrook led the Thunder to a 12-3 record in December. Durant had averages of 24.9 points, 7.2 rebounds, 5.7 assists reaching the 20-point mark in all 15 games. Westbrook had averages of 23.8 points, 5.9 rebounds, 8.9 assists and 2.73 steals.)
February 2, 2016	Kevin Durant (2/2)	February Player of the Month (Note: Durant led the Thunder to a 13-3 record in February with averages of 28.5 points, 9.3 rebounds and 4.3 assists.)
April 5, 2016	Russell Westbrook (2/2)	March Player of the Month (Note: Westbrook led the Thunder to a 11-5 record in March. Westbrook had averages of 21.7 points, 8.3 rebounds and 10.6 assists. He logged seven triple-doubles in March, the most since Michael Jordan had seven in April 1989.)

Date	Player	Award
January 21, 2016	Kevin Durant	All-Star
January 21, 2016	Russell Westbrook	All-Star
May 26, 2016	Russell Westbrook	All-NBA First Team
May 26, 2016	Kevin Durant	All-NBA Second Team

=== Records ===
- After a win against the Denver Nuggets on November 1, 2015, the Thunder won their first three games for the first time since the 2011-12 season.
- On December 3, 2015, the Thunder did not attempt a single three-pointer in the first quarter, the first time that happened this season.
- On December 27, 2015, Kevin Durant and Russell Westbrook became the first teammates since John Stockton and Karl Malone to record at least 25 points and 10 assists in a regulation game. Durant had 26 points and 10 assists while Westbrook had 30 points and 12 assists against the Denver Nuggets.
- On January 20, 2016, Westbrook became the fourth player to record at least 15 points, 15 assists, five rebounds and five steals in a game against the Charlotte Hornets.
- On February 3, 2016, Westbrook recorded a career high 19 rebounds, the most by a point guard since Jason Kidd in 2007.
- On February 3, 2016, Durant moved into 91st place on the NBA's all-time scoring list passing Latrell Sprewell with 16,744 points.
- On March 9, 2016, Westbrook recorded 25 points, a career high 20 assists and 11 rebounds becoming the first player since Magic Johnson to have a triple-double with at least 25 points, 20 assists, and 10 rebounds since 1988. It also was the first triple-double with at least 20 points and 20 assists since Rod Strickland in 1998.
- On March 18, 2016, Westbrook's 13th triple double of the season ties Grant Hill and Jason Kidd for most in a season over the last 25 years.
- On March 22, 2016, Westbrook had his sixth triple double in March, the most in a calendar month since Michael Jordan with seven in April 1989.
- On March 22, 2016, Durant moved into 81st place on the NBA's all-time scoring list passing Michael Finley with 17,326 points.
- On March 28, 2016, Durant moved into 79th place on the NBA's all-time scoring list passing Steve Nash with 17,387 points.
- On March 28, 2016, Durant and Westbrook extended their NBA single-season record for most games with at least 20 points, five rebounds and five assists by a pair of teammates to 22 times.
- On April 6, 2016, Enes Kanter recorded the first 30-point, 20-rebound game in Thunder history. Kanter finished with 33 points, 20 rebounds against the Portland Trail Blazers.
- On April 11, 2016, Westbrook recorded a triple-double before halftime since it began keeping track since the 2002-03 season. Westbrook finished the first half with 11 points, 10 rebounds and 10 assists.
- On April 16, 2016, the Thunder's 108–70, 38 point win against the Dallas Mavericks was its largest victory margin in a playoff game since moving from Seattle as well as the lowest point total allowed in Seattle or Oklahoma City.

== Injuries ==
Player	Duration		Injury	Games missed
Player	Start	End	Injury	Games missed
Kevin Durant	November 13, 2015	November 23, 2015	Left hamstring strain	6
Andre Roberson	November 16, 2015	November 18, 2015	Illness	1
Anthony Morrow	December 17, 2015	December 19, 2015	Personal reasons	1
Kevin Durant	January 4, 2016	January 6, 2016	Right toe sprain	1
Steven Adams	January 22, 2016	January 26, 2016	Right elbow sprain	2
Andre Roberson	January 26, 2016	February 24, 2016	Right knee sprain	10
Cameron Payne	January 29, 2016	February 1, 2016	Concussion	1
Dion Waiters	March 9, 2016	March 16, 2016	Personal reasons	4
Kyle Singler	March 22, 2016	March 26, 2016	Low back soreness	2

== Transactions ==
=== Overview ===
Players Added

Via draft

- Cameron Payne

Via free agency

- Josh Huestis
  (Draft rights)
Players Lost

Via trade

- Jeremy Lamb
- Perry Jones

=== Trades ===
June 25, 2015	To Oklahoma City Thunder Luke Ridnour; 2016 second-round pick	To Charlotte Hornets Jeremy Lamb
June 30, 2015	To Oklahoma City Thunder Draft rights to Tomislav Zubcic	To Toronto Raptors Luke Ridnour; Cash considerations
July 14, 2015	To Oklahoma City Thunder 2018 second-round pick	To Boston Celtics Perry Jones; 2019 second-round pick Cash considerations
February 18, 2016	To Oklahoma City Thunder Randy Foye	To Denver Nuggets D. J. Augustin; Steve Novak; Two 2016 second-round picks Cash considerations

=== Free agency ===
==== Re-signed ====
Date	Player	Contract
July 9, 2015	Kyle Singler	Multi-Year Contract
July 12, 2015	Enes Kanter	Multi-Year Contract

==== Additions ====
Date	Player	Contract	Former team
July 30, 2015	Josh Huestis	Standard	Oklahoma City Blue (D-League)
In-Season Additions
March 5, 2016	Nazr Mohammed	Standard	Chicago Bulls

==== Subtractions ====
Date	Player	Reason left	New team
