= Vin Bhavnani =

American basketball coach

Toronto Raptors
- Position: Assistant coach
- League: NBA

Personal information
- Born: August 7, 1980 (age 46) Los Angeles, California, U.S.

Career information
- College: University of Southern California
- Coaching career: 2006–present

Career history

Coaching
- 2006–2008: San Antonio Spurs (assistant)
- 2008–2019: Oklahoma City Thunder (assistant)
- 2023–present: Toronto Raptors (assistant)

Vinay M Bhavnani (born August 7, 1980) is an American professional basketball coach who is an assistant coach of the Toronto Raptors of the NBA. He is also the only male assistant coach of Indian descent in the NBA.

== Coaching career ==
Bhavnani, born and raised in Los Angeles, majored in biomedical engineering from the University of Southern California and spent one season as an assistant coach for the women's basketball team at Santa Monica Junior College. An acquaintance from University of Southern California got him in touch with a scout working with the Denver Nuggets, helped Bhavnani get an internship with the Los Angeles Clippers in 2004 where he was an unpaid intern in the video department for 3 years. James Borrego, who back then worked with Bhavnani at the Clippers, offered him a job with the San Antonio Spurs in 2006 where he was hired as the assistant video coordinator with the Spurs. He was then hired by the Oklahoma City Thunder in 2008 as head video coordinator. He then became the manager of advance scouting/player development for five seasons, and was then hired to be an assistant coach with the Thunder. In 2023 he was hired as an assistant coach as a part of new head coach Darko Rajaković’s staff with the Toronto Raptors. Rajaković previously worked with Bhavnani when they were both assistant coaches for the Oklahoma City Thunder.
