= Paul George =

American basketball player (born 1990)

- George with the Philadelphia 76ers in 2026

No. 13 – Boston Celtics
- Position: Small forward / power forward
- League: NBA

Personal information
- Born: May 2, 1990 (age 36) Palmdale, California, U.S.
- Listed height: 6 ft 8 in (2.03 m)
- Listed weight: 230 lb (104 kg)

Career information
- High school: Knight (Palmdale, California)
- College: Fresno State (2008–2010)
- NBA draft: 2010: 1st round, 10th overall pick
- Drafted by: Indiana Pacers
- Playing career: 2010–present

Career history
- 2010–2017: Indiana Pacers
- 2017–2019: Oklahoma City Thunder
- 2019–2024: Los Angeles Clippers
- 2024–2026: Philadelphia 76ers
- 2026–present: Boston Celtics

Career highlights
- 9× NBA All-Star (2013, 2014, 2016–2019, 2021, 2023, 2024); All-NBA First Team (2019); 5× All-NBA Third Team (2013, 2014, 2016, 2018, 2021); 2× NBA All-Defensive First Team (2014, 2019); 2× NBA All-Defensive Second Team (2013, 2016); NBA All-Rookie Second Team (2011); NBA Most Improved Player (2013); NBA steals leader (2019); Second-team All-WAC (2010); No. 24 retired by Fresno State Bulldogs
- Stats at NBA.com
- Stats at Basketball Reference
Medals
Men's basketball
Representing the United States
Olympic Games
Gold medal – first place	2016 Rio de Janeiro	Team

Paul Clifton Anthony George Sr. (born May 2, 1990) is an American professional basketball player for the Boston Celtics of the National Basketball Association (NBA). Nicknamed "PG-13", he is a nine-time NBA All-Star and six-time member of the All-NBA Team, as well as a four-time member of the NBA All-Defensive Team.

George played high school basketball for Knight High School before playing two seasons of college basketball for the Fresno State Bulldogs. He was selected by the Indiana Pacers with the 10th overall pick of the 2010 NBA draft, and earned NBA All-Rookie Second Team honors. He was named the NBA Most Improved Player in 2013, when he also earned his first All-Star selection and led the team to their first Eastern Conference Finals trip since 2004.

George suffered a broken leg in 2014 while competing for a roster spot on the United States national team for the FIBA Basketball World Cup. He missed most of the 2014–15 season, but recovered to become an All-Star again in 2016, when he also won an Olympic gold medal. He was traded to the Oklahoma City Thunder in 2017, and played two seasons for the Thunder before he was traded to the Los Angeles Clippers in 2019. The Clippers appeared in the playoffs four times during his tenure, including their first trip to the Conference Finals in 2021. George signed with the Philadelphia 76ers in 2024, where he played until he was traded to the Boston Celtics in 2026.

== Early life ==
George was born in Los Angeles County in Palmdale, California, and is the son of Paul George and Paulette George. He grew up with two older sisters: Teiosha, who played basketball at Pepperdine, and Portala, who played volleyball at CSU-San Bernardino. George idolized Lakers star Kobe Bryant, and he grew up rooting for the Los Angeles Lakers and Los Angeles Clippers. George spent most of his free time playing basketball at the park or one-on-one against his older sister Teiosha. He attended Knight High School and played for Pump and Run of the Amateur Athletic Union (AAU) where he played with Jrue Holiday.

== High school career ==
George attended Knight High School in Palmdale. As a sophomore, he began the season on the JV team and was moved up to varsity after the season started. Recruiters began noticing George during the summer of 2007, when he competed in AAU tournaments. Sensing George's potential, his coach handed him a leading role his senior season. That year, George led Knight to the Golden League championship, and was named the Golden League Most Valuable Player, the Antelope Valley Press Player of the Year, and a member of the Daily News 2007–08 All-Area Boys' basketball team. He ended his senior year averaging 23.2 points and 11.2 rebounds.

George was not considered a major prospect by colleges. Rivals.com labeled him as a three-star recruit and ranked him 20th among a class of California prospects that was highlighted by Jrue Holiday and DeMar DeRozan. George verbally committed to Santa Clara, the first school that offered him a scholarship, but he later de-committed from them because his high school coach thought he should keep his options open. After a positive experience attending Teiosha's Midnight Madness event at Pepperdine University, George committed to Pepperdine on August 9, 2007. Midway through his senior season, he de-committed from Pepperdine after coach Vance Walberg resigned from the program. He ultimately chose Fresno State over offers from schools like Georgetown and Penn State because it was closer to home which allowed for his family to watch his games and because he liked the campus.

== College career ==
George played two years at California State University, Fresno, more commonly known as Fresno State. In his first game with the Bulldogs, he scored 14 points in a winning effort against Sacramento State. The following game, George recorded 25 points and 10 rebounds in a losing effort against Saint Mary's. Despite the loss, he made an impression with his one-handed slam dunk over Mickey McConnell that earned him SportsCenter's number 1 "Play of the Day" for November 18, 2008. On February 9, 2009, he scored a then career-high 29 points to lead the Bulldogs to an 88–82 victory over Boise State. In the 2009 WAC tournament, the Bulldogs were matched up against Hawaii and advanced to the quarterfinal against the top-seeded Utah State Aggies. During the game, he forced a career-high 5 steals and finished with a team-high 16 points in a loss against the Bulldogs to a score of 85–68. With a 13–21 record, the team failed to qualify for the 2009 NCAA tournament. He led the Western Athletic Conference (WAC) in minutes played (1,176) and finished second in 3-point shooting (44.7%), steals (59) and steals per game (1.74). His 3-point field goal percentage was the third-best in the Fresno State Bulldogs men's basketball program. He started all 34 games and finished the season averaging 14.3 points, 6.2 rebounds, 2.0 assists and 1.7 steals per game on 47.0% from the field.

Entering his sophomore season, he was named the most entertaining player in the West region and the eighth most entertaining player in college basketball by Sports Illustrated in their list of the "Top 16 Most Entertaining Players in College Basketball". On January 21, 2010, he sprained his right ankle against Utah State and missed the next four games. He made his return on February 11, scoring a career-high 30 points in a winning effort over eventual WAC tournament champion New Mexico State. During the 2010 WAC tournament, he recorded 22 points and 11 rebounds, in a loss against Louisiana Tech in the quarterfinals. The team finished the season 15–18, with George averaging 16.8 points, 7.2 rebounds, 3.0 assists, and 2.2 steals while shooting 42.4 percent from the field and 90.9 percent from the line. He was named All-WAC Second-Team and ranked second in the WAC in free throw percentage (90.9%), steals (64) and steals per game (2.2).

On November 10, 2019, George's number 24 was retired by Fresno State.

== Professional career ==
=== Indiana Pacers (2010–2017) ===
==== Pre-draft and rookie season ====
On March 31, 2010, George announced that he would forgo his final two seasons of college eligibility at Fresno State and enter the 2010 NBA draft. He made his first appearance on a 2010 mock draft on Draft Express a month into his sophomore season. By May 2010, mock drafts such as Draft Express, ESPN.com, and The Hoops Report predicted that George would be selected 12th overall by the Memphis Grizzlies. Two days before the draft, Marc J. Spears from Yahoo! Sports wrote an article about an anonymous Eastern Conference scout stating that "in five years, Paul George will be the best player to come out of this draft". Hoping to draft Derrick Favors, the Pacers had discussed a draft trade with the Nets that would have sent Danny Granger and the 10th pick to the Nets for Devin Harris, Yi Jianlian and the 3rd overall pick, but the deal fell through. George was invited to sit in the green room during the draft and was selected tenth overall by the Indiana Pacers. He became the highest NBA draft pick in Fresno State history. On July 1, 2010, he signed his rookie contract with the Pacers; a two-year guaranteed deal worth $3.9 million, with team options for a third and fourth year.

On October 27, George made his NBA debut against the San Antonio Spurs, playing 23 minutes and scoring 4 points on 1–5 shooting. In a game against the Washington Wizards, he knocked down five three-pointers and finished with a then-career-high 23 points. George averaged 7.8 points, 3.7 rebounds, 1.1 assists on 45% shooting in his first season, starting 19 of his 61 games. For the 2011 Playoffs, George was one of only two rookies from the 2010 NBA Draft to be in the starting lineup for his team, the other being Landry Fields for the New York Knicks. In the playoffs, the Pacers lost in five games to the Chicago Bulls, led by Derrick Rose. Upon completion of his inaugural season, George was named to the 2011 NBA All-Rookie Second Team.

==== 2011–12 season ====
On February 3, 2012, George recorded 30 points, 7 three-pointers made, 9 rebounds, 5 assists, 5 steals, and 1 blocked shot in a win against the Dallas Mavericks. George was selected to compete in the Slam Dunk Contest and Rising Stars Challenge during the 2012 NBA All-Star Weekend. In the Slam Dunk Contest, George completed a 360° windmill dunk in the dark and dunked over teammates Dahntay Jones and Roy Hibbert. The windmill dunk is when a player brings the ball below their waist and with an outstretched arm swings the ball into the rim. However, he lost the contest to Jeremy Evans. He finished the 2011–12 lockout-shortened season with averages of 12.1 points, 5.6 rebounds and 2.4 assists on 44% shooting; George started all 66 games for the Pacers in the season. After beating the Orlando Magic, who were without Dwight Howard, in five games in the first round, the Pacers lost to the eventual NBA champions, the Miami Heat, 4–2 in the Eastern Conference Semifinals, with George making just 19 of 52 field goals.

==== 2012–13 season ====
During his first two seasons in the NBA, George played mostly the shooting guard position. However, with Danny Granger missing nearly the entire season due to knee and calf injuries, George began playing the small forward position and became the go-to offensive option for the Pacers in his third season. On November 21, 2012, George made nine three-pointers en route to a career-high 37 points in a victory against the New Orleans Hornets. The nine 3-pointers broke the franchise record for most 3-pointers made in a single game, surpassing Hall of Famer Reggie Miller. George was named the NBA's Player of the Week for the first time in his career in December, winning three straight games against Cleveland, Philadelphia, and Detroit. He recorded his first career triple-double in a victory over the Charlotte Bobcats on February 13, 2013, finishing with 23 points, 12 rebounds, 12 assists and 2 steals. That same season, George was selected to play in the 2013 NBA All-Star Game in Houston for the first All-Star selection of his career. He recorded 17 points, 3 rebounds and 4 assists on 7-of-13 shooting in 20 minutes for the East in a loss against the West, 143–138. George averaged career highs of 17.4 points, 7.6 rebounds and 4.1 assists, and was the only player in the league with at least 140 steals and 50 blocks. At the conclusion of the regular season, he was named the NBA Most Improved Player.

In Game 1 of the Pacers' 2013 NBA playoffs first-round series versus the Atlanta Hawks, George recorded his first career playoff triple-double, tallying 23 points, 11 rebounds and 12 assists in a 107–90 win. It was the first postseason triple-double by a Pacers player since Mark Jackson had one in the 1998 playoffs. On May 13, 2013, George was named to the NBA All-Defensive Second Team. George led the Pacers with 18 points, 14 rebounds and 7 assists in Game 4 of the Eastern Conference semifinals against the Knicks on May 14, 2013, in a 93–82 victory. In Game 1 of the 2013 Eastern Conference Finals against the Miami Heat, George made a three-point field goal at the end of the fourth quarter to tie the game and force an overtime period. During overtime, Dwyane Wade fouled George with 2.2 seconds remaining. Despite George making all 3 free-throws and putting his team up 102–101, the Pacers ultimately lost as LeBron James drove in for a buzzer-beater lay-up. The Pacers lost to the Heat in 7 games. To cap off a great 2012–13 campaign, George was named to the All-NBA Third Team.

==== 2013–14 season ====
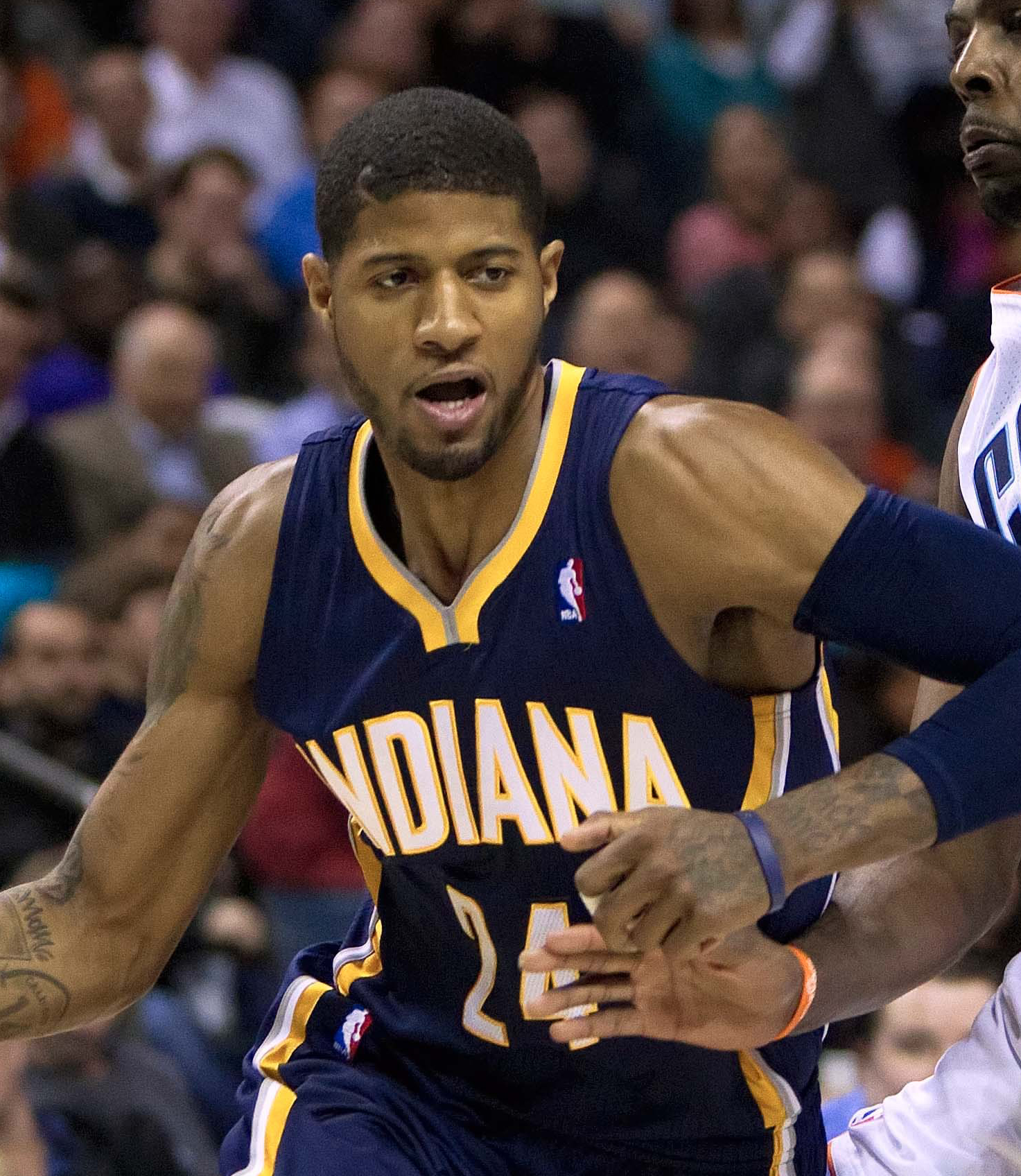
George with the Pacers in 2014

On September 25, 2013, the Indiana Pacers extended George's contract, electing him to be their designated player. The extension, which would start at the end of his rookie contract in 2014, was a "5/30" designated player extension (5 years and 30% of the salary cap), subject to passing the "Derrick Rose" test. George had to be elected to one further All-NBA team (at any level) or be the MVP during the 2013–14 season to qualify for the 30% extension. If he met either of these criteria, the 30% extension was estimated to be worth around $90 million over the 5-year deal. If he had failed to meet the criteria, he would be contracted at 25% of the salary cap.

The Pacers started the 2013–14 season 9–0 for the first time in franchise history. George finished with 31 points, 10 rebounds, 4 assists, and 4 steals in a 99–91 victory over the Detroit Pistons. He then posted 23 points, 8 rebounds and 6 assists during a 91–84 win over the Toronto Raptors on November 8. The following day he scored 24 points and added 6 rebounds in a 96–91 victory over the Brooklyn Nets. For his efforts, he was named Eastern Conference Player of the Week. With nine wins to start the season, Indiana became the first NBA team to start the season 9–0 since the Dallas Mavericks in the 2002–03 season. The Pacers undefeated streak ended at 9–0 against the Bulls on November 16. On December 2, 2013, he scored a career-high 43 points, along with 3 rebounds and 3 assists, in a 106–102 loss to the Portland Trail Blazers. The following day, George was named Eastern Conference Player of the Month, the first time in his career, for the month of November while leading the Pacers to a 15–1 record. The Pacers finished the regular season with an incredible 56–26 record. In the 2014 playoffs, the Pacers eliminated the Atlanta Hawks and the Washington Wizards in the first two rounds. In game 4 against the Wizards, George scored a then playoff career-high 39 points. The Pacers were eliminated in the Eastern Conference Finals against the Miami Heat for the third straight year. For his efforts, George was named to the All-NBA third team, which qualified him for the full 30% extension and All-Defensive First Team.

==== 2014–15 season: off-season injury ====
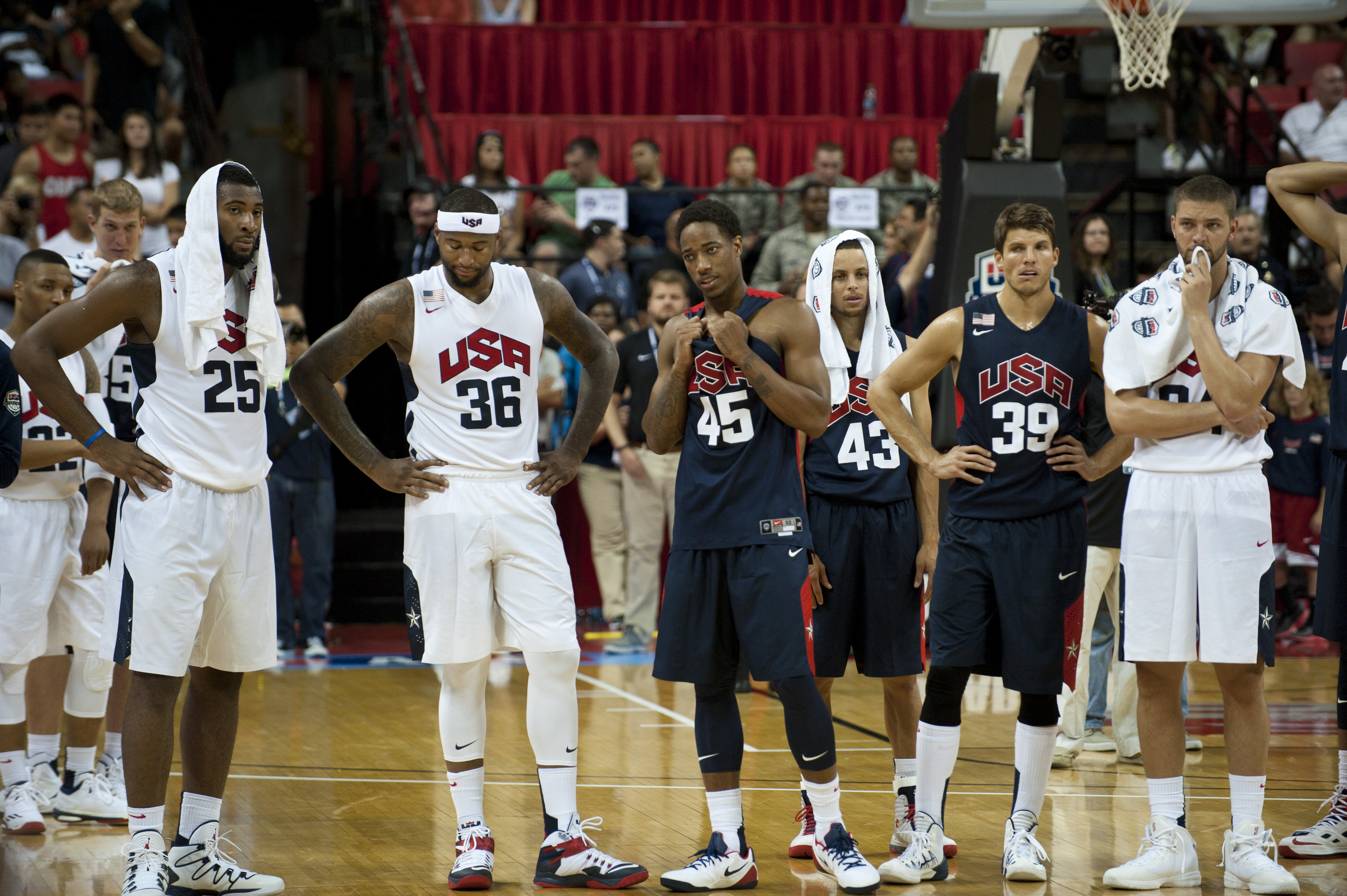
Players on the US national team react after George suffered a serious leg injury during the fourth quarter of an intra-squad scrimmage on August 1, 2014

During the 2014 off-season, George was named to the training camp roster for the US national team that would represent the country at the 2014 FIBA Basketball World Cup in Spain. George had been considered a virtual lock to make the roster, but he landed awkwardly at the base of a basket stanchion after fouling James Harden during a Las Vegas scrimmage on August 1, and suffered a compound fracture of both bones in his lower right leg. After George was carted off the court, head coach Mike Krzyzewski addressed the arena stating the scrimmage would not continue out of respect to George and his family. George quickly went into surgery for the fracture, with a pin being inserted in the leg. While no official prognosis was initially given, he was considered likely to miss the entire 2014–15 season. George, who had said he wanted to play at some time during the season, was cleared to put weight on the leg in late September, and was shooting jumpers in practice in late October. He participated in his first full practice of the season on February 26, three days earlier than expected, and was ruled a possibility to play within a week on March 20. On April 5, George made his return to the Pacers line-up for the first time since sustaining his leg injury with Team USA. He scored 13 points in 15 minutes and made two key three-pointers early in the fourth quarter, helping the Pacers defeat the Miami Heat 112–89. He played out the final six games of the season for Indiana, averaging 8.8 points and 3.7 rebounds per game.

==== 2015–16 season ====
In the Pacers' 2015–16 season opener against the Toronto Raptors on October 28, George recorded 17 points on 4-of-17 shooting and 12 rebounds in a 106–99 loss. He publicly criticized the referees after the game, drawing a $10,000 fine. On November 6, he scored 36 points in a 90–87 win over the Miami Heat. Three days later, he scored 27 points, including a career-high 19 points in the first quarter, to lead the Pacers to a 97–84 win over the Orlando Magic. On November 24, George scored 40 points and made seven three-pointers, part of a franchise-record 19 by the Pacers in a 123–106 victory over the Washington Wizards. On December 3, he was named the Eastern Conference Player of the Month for games played in October and November. George led the Eastern Conference and ranked fourth in the NBA in scoring (27.2 ppg), helping the Pacers win 11 of 13 games after an 0–3 start. Two days later, he scored a career-high 48 points in a 122–119 overtime loss to the Utah Jazz. George competed for the Eastern Conference in the 2016 NBA All-Star Game in Toronto, where he started and was the game's leading scorer with 41 points, finishing one point shy of the All-Star game record set by Wilt Chamberlain (42) in 1962. On March 19, he had a 45-point game in a 115–111 loss to the Oklahoma City Thunder. George helped the Pacers return to the playoffs in 2016, finishing as the seventh seed in the Eastern Conference with a 45–37 record.

On April 16, 2016, George played in his first playoff game since 2014, as he scored 33 points in a Game 1 victory over the second-seeded Toronto Raptors. In Game 5 of the series, George scored 39 points in a losing effort, as the Pacers fell behind 3–2. The Pacers went on to lose the series in seven games.

After the 2015–16 season, George joined the United States national team for the 2016 Summer Olympics.

==== 2016–17 season ====
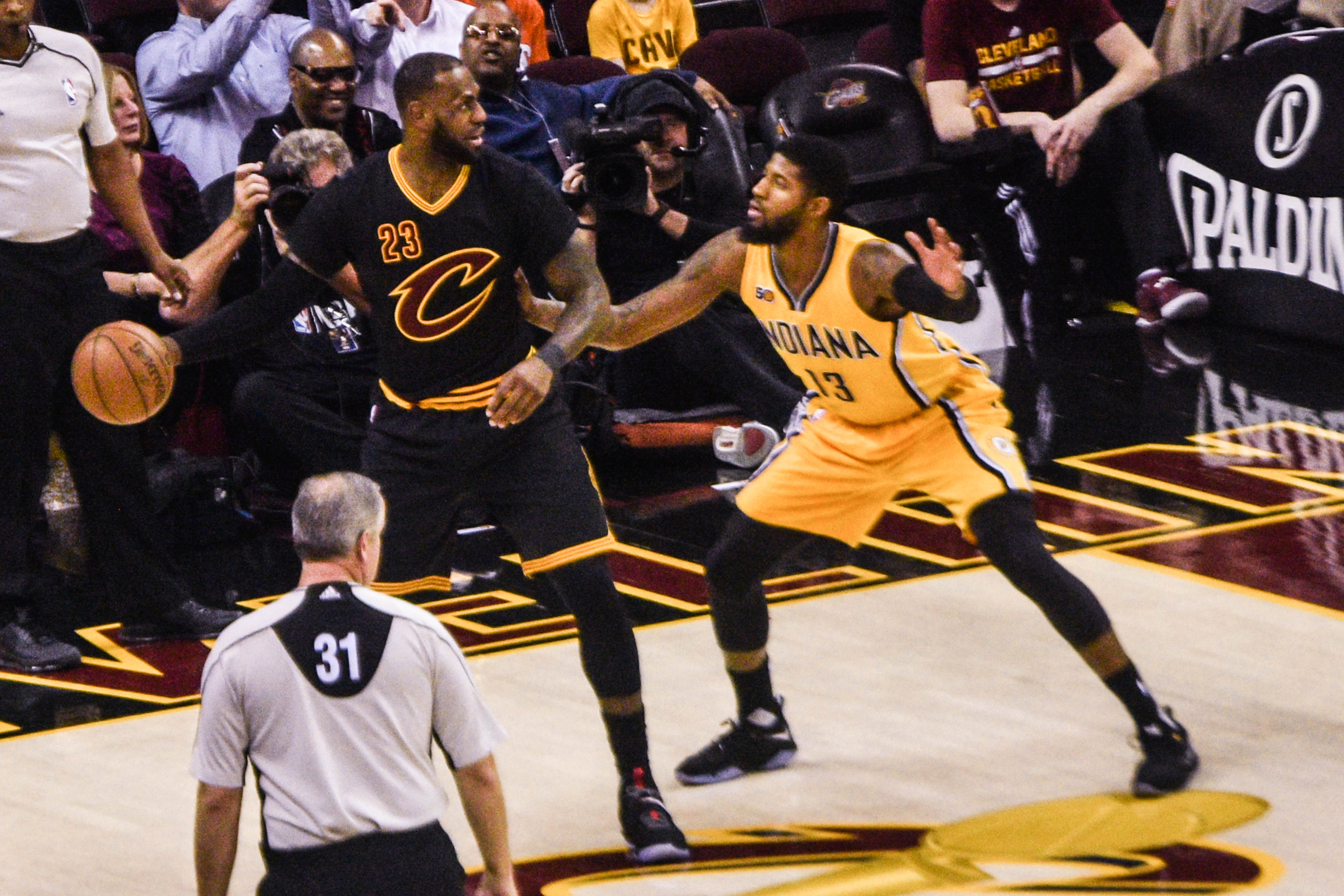
George defending LeBron James in 2017

In the Pacers' season opener on October 26, 2016, George scored 25 points in a 130–121 overtime win over the Dallas Mavericks. On November 1, he scored 30 points, including Indiana's final 12 of the game, to rally the Pacers to a 115–108 win over the Los Angeles Lakers. On December 10, he scored a then season-high 37 points, including 13 straight in the fourth quarter, to lead the Pacers to a 118–111 win over the Portland Trail Blazers. On January 29, 2017, he scored 33 points in a 120–101 win over the Houston Rockets, matching a career high by topping the 30-point mark for the fourth straight game. On March 15, 2017, he made six three-pointers and scored 27 of his season-high 39 points in the second half of the Pacers' 98–77 win over the Charlotte Hornets. On April 2, 2017, he had a 43-point effort in a 135–130 double overtime loss to the Cleveland Cavaliers. On April 14, 2017, he was named Eastern Conference Player of the Month for games played in April in which he averaged an NBA-high 32.8 points, 8.2 rebounds and 4.5 assists. The Pacers went 5-1 during this stretch and were able to get a spot in the playoffs for the sixth time in the last seven seasons.

In Game 3 of the Pacers' first-round playoff match-up with Cleveland on April 20, George scored 36 points, grabbed a playoff career-high 15 rebounds and finished with nine assists, one short of his second postseason triple-double. After leading 74–49 at halftime, the Pacers went on to lose the game 119–114 to go down 3–0 in the series.

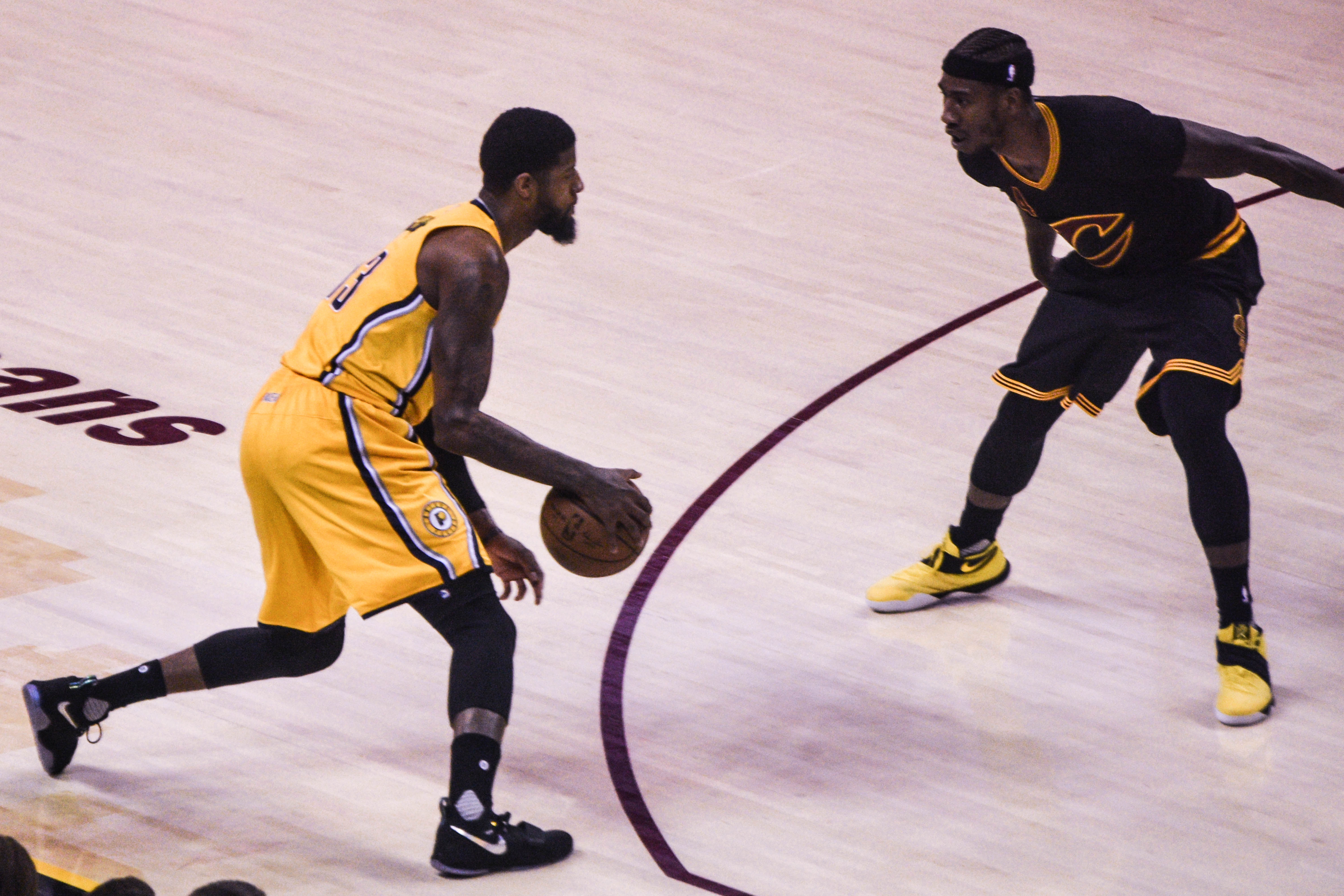
Iman Shumpert defending Paul George in 2017

=== Oklahoma City Thunder (2017–2019) ===
==== 2017–18 season ====
On July 6, 2017, George was traded to the Oklahoma City Thunder for Victor Oladipo and Domantas Sabonis. The Thunder acquired him in spite of his pending free agent status the following year and George's stated preference to join the Los Angeles Lakers in his native Southern California. In his debut for the Thunder in their season opener on October 19, 2017, George scored a team-high 28 points in a 105–84 win over the New York Knicks. On November 10, 2017, he scored a season-high 42 points in a 120–111 win over the Los Angeles Clippers. He made 13 of 22 shots and had nine rebounds and seven assists. After starting the season with an 8–12 record, the Thunder improved to 20–15 with a 124–107 win over the Toronto Raptors on December 27. George scored 33 points against the Raptors and went 7 of 10 from 3-point range, tying the Thunder record for 3-pointers in a game.

On January 20, 2018, he had a 36-point effort in a 148–124 win over the Cleveland Cavaliers. On January 27, 2018, George was named as a replacement for the injured DeMarcus Cousins on Team LeBron for the 2018 NBA All-Star Game. On February 1, 2018, he scored a season-high 43 points in a 127–124 loss to the Denver Nuggets. In the Thunder's regular season finale on April 11, 2018, George scored 40 points in a 137–123 win over the Memphis Grizzlies. He went 13 of 20 from the field, including eight of 14 3-pointers.

In Game 1 of the Thunder's first-round playoff series against the Utah Jazz, George scored 36 points in a 116–108 win. He set an Oklahoma City playoff record with eight 3-pointers, making eight of 11 shots from long range, and 13 of 20 shots overall. In Game 4, George scored a team-high 32 points in a 113–96 loss. In Game 5, George recorded 34 points and eight rebounds, as the Thunder rallied from 25 points down in the second half to fight off elimination and beat the Jazz 107–99. The Thunder went on to lose Game 6 to bow out of the playoffs with a 4–2 defeat; George recorded a game-high eight assists in Game 6, with a scoring total of five points on 2-of-16 shooting.

==== 2018–19 season ====
While he still wanted to return to Southern California, George also "loved the situation" with Oklahoma City. He decided weeks before free agency began on July 1, 2018, that he would stay with the Thunder, and never arranged a meeting with the Lakers. On July 6, George re-signed with the Thunder to a reported four-year, $137 million contract. On November 8, he had 20 points, 11 rebounds, six assists and six steals in a 98–80 win over the Houston Rockets, helping the Thunder win seven straight after starting the season 0–4. On November 14, he scored a then season-high 35 points in a 128–103 win over the New York Knicks. On December 5, he scored 25 of his 47 points in the fourth quarter, including a go-ahead 3-pointer with 3.1 seconds left that gave the Thunder a 114–112 victory over the Brooklyn Nets. On December 19, he recorded 43 points and 12 rebounds in a 132–113 win over the Sacramento Kings. On December 22, he had 43 points and 14 rebounds in a 107–106 win over the Jazz.

On January 29, he scored 31 of his 37 points in the first half of the Thunder's 126–117 win over the Orlando Magic. On February 1, he scored 43 points and had a career-high 10 3-pointers in a 118–102 win over the Miami Heat. On February 5, he scored 39 points in a 132–122 win over the Magic, thus scoring at least 37 points for the fifth straight game. On February 9, he scored 45 points in a 117–112 win over the Rockets. On February 11, he recorded his third career triple-double with 47 points, 12 rebounds and 10 assists in a 120–111 win over the Portland Trail Blazers. On February 22, he scored 45 points and hit the game-winning floater with 0.8 seconds left in the second overtime to lift the Thunder to a 148–147 win over the Jazz. On February 26, George injured his shoulder against the Denver Nuggets which led to his three-point percentages decreasing from 40.2% to 33.8% on 9.7 attempts per game. Despite this, he was named Western Conference Player of the Month for February and subsequently finished the season third in both MVP and DPOY voting. The Thunder were eliminated in the first round of the playoffs by the Trail Blazers in five games, with George scoring 36 points in Game 5. George had two surgeries on his shoulder from the game on February 26 during the off-season, with the first surgery being on a partially torn tendon and the other on his labrum.

=== Los Angeles Clippers (2019–2024) ===
==== 2019–20 season ====
On July 10, 2019, George was sent from the Thunder to the Clippers for Shai Gilgeous-Alexander, Danilo Gallinari, five first-round draft picks, and the rights to swap two other first-round picks, in a trade which helped the Clippers sign top free agent Kawhi Leonard that offseason. After missing the first eleven games of the regular season recovering from two shoulder surgeries. George made his Clippers debut on November 14, 2019, against the New Orleans Pelicans, scoring 33 points in a 132–127 loss. Two days later, in his home debut against the Atlanta Hawks, George put up 37 points in just 20 minutes in a 150–101 victory. On December 9, George made his return to Indiana and recorded 36 points and nine rebounds in a 110–99 win over his former team in the Indiana Pacers. Four days later, George scored a season-high 46 points in a 124–117 win over the Minnesota Timberwolves, as he and Kawhi Leonard became the first duo in Clippers history to each score 40 points in a single game with Leonard scoring 42.

During the 2020 NBA Playoffs in Orlando, Florida, after the abrupt halt of the season due to the COVID-19 pandemic, George drew frequent criticism from NBA fans and media for his inconsistent performance. In 13 playoff games, George averaged 20.2 points per game, marking his lowest postseason scoring average since his third season in the NBA. He shot 39.8% from the field, which was the fourth occasion in his career that he finished a playoff series with a shooting percentage below 40%. George in particular was blamed for the Clippers' second round loss to the Denver Nuggets, in which the team squandered a 3–1 series lead, becoming the 12th team in NBA history to do so. In Game 7 against the Nuggets, George only scored 10 points on 25% shooting and failed to score in the 4th quarter. George's dismal performance in Game 7 included one memorable miss on a three-point shot attempt in which the ball hit the side of the backboard. In online forums, such as the social media website Twitter, George garnered the nickname "Pandemic P," which is an ironic reference to the "Playoff P" nickname that George infamously christened himself with a few years prior.

==== 2020–21 season ====
On December 10, 2020, George signed a four-year, $190 million contract extension with the Clippers. On December 22, George scored 33 points, of which 26 were in the second half, to lead the Clippers to a 116–109 season-opening victory over the defending champion Los Angeles Lakers. In Game 6 of the Conference Semifinals against the Utah Jazz, George recorded 28 points, nine rebounds, seven assists, and three steals in a 131–119 victory, leading the Clippers to the Western Conference Finals for the first time in franchise history. Playing against the Phoenix Suns in his third career Conference Finals, George scored a playoff career-high 41 points, alongside 13 rebounds and six assists in a crucial 116–102 Game 5 victory. The Clippers lost to the Suns in six games.

==== 2021–22 season ====
On October 29, 2021, George scored a season-high 42 points and grabbed eight rebounds in a 92–111 loss to the Portland Trail Blazers. On December 6, during a 102–90 win over the Trail Blazers, George sprained his elbow and missed the next five games before returning to the lineup in a 92–116 loss to the San Antonio Spurs on December 20. On December 25, the Clippers announced that George had suffered a torn ulnar collateral ligament (UCL) in his right elbow. On March 29, 2022, his first game back from injury, George scored 34 points, with six assists and four steals, in a 121–115 comeback victory over the Utah Jazz. On April 9, George tied his career best with 12 assists and added 23 points, 8 rebounds and 2 steals in a 117–98 win over the Sacramento Kings.

==== 2022–23 season ====
On October 22, 2022, George scored 40 points, grabbed 6 rebounds, and had 6 assists in an 111–109 win over the Sacramento Kings. It was the 20th time in his career, including playoffs, where he scored at least 40 points, and his fifth as a member of the Clippers. On October 31, George put up 35 points, nine rebounds, eight assists, six steals, and two blocks, alongside a game-winner in a 95–93 win over the Houston Rockets. On December 14, George recorded his 4th career triple-double with 17 points, 11 rebounds and 11 assists in a 99–88 win over the Minnesota Timberwolves. On December 31, George scored a season-high 45 points, along with 9 rebounds, 4 assists and 3 steals in a 131–130 loss against his former team, the Indiana Pacers.

On March 5, 2023, George posted 42 points and 11 rebounds in a 135–129 win over the Memphis Grizzlies. On March 21, he suffered a right leg injury in a 101–100 loss against the Oklahoma City Thunder with 4:38 remaining in the game. The next day, the Clippers announced that George was diagnosed with a right knee sprain and would be re-evaluated in two-to-three weeks, ending his regular season run.

==== 2023–24 season ====
On October 28, 2023, George scored 36 points and went 15 for 15 from the free-throw line in a 120–118 loss against the Utah Jazz. On December 2, George recorded 25 points, six rebounds, six assists, and a game-winning three-pointer in a 113–112 win over the Golden State Warriors.

On January 12, 2024, George scored 37 points on 12-of-18 shooting, 7-of-10 from three, 6-of-6 from the free throw line in a 128–119 win over the Memphis Grizzlies. On January 16, George scored a then season-high 38 points on 15-of-24 shooting and 6-of-12 from three with seven rebounds, five assists, three steals and zero turnovers in a 128–117 win over the Oklahoma City Thunder. The Clippers were trailing by 13 by the start of the third quarter, and George scored 11 out of the final 14 points for the Clippers.

On April 1, George scored a season-high 41 points against the Charlotte Hornets on 14-of-21 shooting, going 8-of-12 from three and 5-of-5 from the free throw line in a 130–118 win. On April 7, George scored 39 points with 23 in the fourth quarter, along with 11 rebounds and seven assists in a 120–118 win with George making the go-ahead bucket followed by a block in the final play. The Clippers were trailing by 26 points which marked the greatest comeback in franchise history.

In game 3 of the first round of the 2024 playoffs against the Dallas Mavericks, George shot 3-of-11 and ended the game with 7 points with 5 fouls in a loss. In the following game, George had 33 points, 6 rebounds, 8 assists and 4 steals with 26 points during the first half, and a go-ahead corner 3-pointer in the late fourth quarter. The Clippers lost the series to the Mavericks 4–2.

On June 29, 2024, George opted out of his player option in his $48.7 million contract with the Clippers for the 2024–25 season, becoming a free agent.

=== Philadelphia 76ers (2024–2026) ===
==== 2024–25 season ====
On July 6, 2024, George, then 34 years old, signed a four-year, $212 million contract with the Philadelphia 76ers. With each of his previous jersey numbers, 24 and 13, retired by the franchise, George wore jersey number 8 as a tribute to Philadelphia native Kobe Bryant. The George signing gave the 76ers a star trio of George, center Joel Embiid, and guard Tyrese Maxey. The 76ers were expected to be contenders for the 2025 NBA championship.

George struggled with injuries and ineffectiveness in the 2024–2025 season. He missed the first five games of the season after being diagnosed with a bone bruise from a hyperextended knee during the preseason. On November 4, 2024, he made his 76ers debut, putting up 15 points, five rebounds, and four assists in a 118–116 loss to the Phoenix Suns. On December 16, 2024, George put up 33 points, five rebounds, eight assists, two steals, and one block in a 121–108 win over the Charlotte Hornets. On December 28, 2024, against the Utah Jazz, George surpassed Vince Carter for ninth in all-time three-pointers made with 2,291.

On March 17, 2025, it was announced that George would miss the remainder of the season due to adductor and knee injuries. In 41 games, George averaged 16.2 points, 5.3 rebounds, and 4.3 assists per game. At the time the announcement was made, the 76ers had a 23–45 record. George's season was described as "disappointing" and "disastrous".

==== 2025–26 season ====
Prior to the season, George underwent an arthroscopic procedure on his left knee to treat an injury suffered during a workout. On January 31, 2026, George was suspended for 25 games for violating the NBA's anti-drug policy by taking "improper medication". On April 1, George scored 39 points in a 153–131 victory over the Washington Wizards, his highest scoring total since joining the 76ers. In 37 total appearances for Philadelphia during the 2025–26 season, George averaged 17.3 points, 5.3 rebounds, and 3.6 assists.

=== Boston Celtics (2026–present) ===
On July 6, 2026, George was traded to the Boston Celtics alongside a 2028 NBA draft first-round selection, a 2031 NBA draft first-round selection, a 2028 second-round pick and a 2030 NBA draft second-round pick in exchange for Jaylen Brown.

On October 20, George made his Celtics debut, putting up 38 points, five rebounds, five steals, and three assists in a 121–113 loss to the Detroit Pistons. His 38 points surpassed the previous record set by Kristaps Porziņģis for the most points scored in a debut in Celtics franchise history. He became the first player to record at least 35 points and five steals in his debut for a new team since the NBA began tracking steals in the 1973–74 season. George also surpassed Kyle Korver for eighth place on the NBA's all-time three-pointers made list, bringing his career total to 2,456. On November 10, George scored 36 points in his first game against the Philadelphia 76ers since being traded to the Celtics, including 14 consecutive points in the fourth quarter to help seal a 123–101 victory.

== Player profile ==
NBA.com lists George's height as 6 feet 8 inches (2.03 m), while The Indianapolis Star reported in December 2011 that he grew 2 inches (5.1 cm) to 6 feet 10 inches (2.08 m). He entered the league as a shooting guard but was later moved to the small forward position, with the emergence of Pacers shooting guard Lance Stephenson. Stephenson's improvement as a facilitator and distributor in the backcourt allowed George to play off the ball more often during games. Early in his career, he was unable to create shots for himself and lacked a great deal of ball handle, something he worked on with trainer Jerry Powell during the 2012 off-season. With All-Star swingman Danny Granger injured during the 2012–13 season, George took on a larger offensive responsibility, which resulted in the NBA Most Improved Player Award.

George has established himself as one of the best perimeter defenders in the NBA. In addition to his athleticism, he has developed a reputation as a high-flyer by participating in the 2012 and 2014 Slam Dunk Contest. After the Pacers' win over the Denver Nuggets on February 10, 2014, Nuggets head coach Brian Shaw called George "the best two-way player in the game". George's rapid improvement led Pablo Torre of ESPN to dub him the NBA's most anomalous superstar, while stating: "Has anyone in the NBA ever become better, faster than Paul George?"

In August 2014, George changed his uniform number from 24 to 13, giving him the more marketable moniker of PG-13. He donated his old jerseys to his high school in Palmdale, California.

== Awards and honors ==
NBA

- 9× NBA All-Star: 2013, 2014, 2016–2019, 2021, 2023, 2024
- 6× All-NBA Team selections:
  - All-NBA First Team: 2019
  - 5× All-NBA Third Team: 2013, 2014, 2016, 2018, 2021
- 4× NBA All-Defensive Team selections:
  - 2× NBA All-Defensive First Team: 2014, 2019
  - 2× NBA All-Defensive Second Team: 2013, 2016
- NBA All-Rookie Second Team: 2011
- NBA Most Improved Player: 2013
- NBA steals leader: 2019

USA Basketball

- Olympics gold medalist: 2016

== Career statistics ==
Legend
GP	Games played	GS	Games started	MPG	Minutes per game
FG%	Field goal percentage	3P%	3-point field goal percentage	FT%	Free throw percentage
RPG	Rebounds per game	APG	Assists per game	SPG	Steals per game
BPG	Blocks per game	PPG	Points per game	**Bold**	Career high
*	Led the league

=== NBA ===
==== Regular season ====
Year	Team	GP	GS	MPG	FG%	3P%	FT%	RPG	APG	SPG	BPG	PPG
2010–11	Indiana	61	19	20.7	.453	.297	.762	3.7	1.1	1.0	.4	7.8
2011–12	Indiana	66*	66*	29.7	.440	.385	.802	5.6	2.4	1.6	**.6**	12.1
2012–13	Indiana	79	79	**37.6**	.419	.362	.807	7.6	4.1	1.8	**.6**	17.4
2013–14	Indiana	80	80	36.2	.424	.364	.864	6.8	3.5	1.9	.3	21.7
2014–15	Indiana	6	0	15.2	.367	.409	.727	3.7	1.0	.8	.2	8.8
2015–16	Indiana	**81**	**81**	34.8	.418	.372	.860	7.0	4.1	1.9	.4	23.1
2016–17	Indiana	75	75	35.9	.461	.394	.898	6.6	3.3	1.6	.4	23.7
2017–18	Oklahoma City	79	79	36.6	.430	.401	.822	5.7	3.3	2.0	.5	21.9
2018–19	Oklahoma City	77	77	36.9	.438	.386	.839	**8.2**	4.1	**2.2***	.4	**28.0**
2019–20	L.A Clippers	48	48	29.6	.439	.412	.876	5.2	3.9	1.4	.4	21.5
2020–21	L.A Clippers	54	54	33.7	.467	.411	.868	6.6	5.2	1.1	.4	23.3
2021–22	L.A Clippers	31	31	34.8	.421	.354	.858	6.9	**5.7**	**2.2**	.4	24.3
2022–23	L.A Clippers	56	56	34.6	.457	.371	.871	6.1	5.1	1.5	.4	23.8
2023–24	L.A Clippers	74	74	33.8	**.471**	**.413**	**.907**	5.2	3.5	1.5	.5	22.6
2024–25	Philadelphia	41	41	32.5	.430	.358	.814	5.3	4.3	1.8	.5	16.2
2025–26	Philadelphia	37	37	30.7	.439	.392	.820	5.3	3.6	1.7	.4	17.3
Career		945	897	33.5	.440	.384	.852	6.2	3.7	1.7	.4	20.5
All-Star		9	3	23.2	.496	.380	1.000	3.3	3.0	1.3	.1	18.0

==== Playoffs ====
Year	Team	GP	GS	MPG	FG%	3P%	FT%	RPG	APG	SPG	BPG	PPG
2011	Indiana	5	5	26.6	.303	.231	.875	5.0	1.0	1.4	**2.0**	6.0
2012	Indiana	11	11	33.7	.389	.268	.786	6.6	2.4	1.6	.4	9.7
2013	Indiana	**19**	**19**	41.0	.430	.327	.727	7.4	5.1	1.3	.5	19.2
2014	Indiana	**19**	**19**	41.1	.438	.403	.789	7.6	3.8	**2.2**	.4	22.6
2016	Indiana	7	7	39.3	.455	.419	**.953**	7.6	4.3	2.0	.7	27.3
2017	Indiana	4	4	**42.9**	.386	.429	.867	8.8	**7.3**	1.8	.5	28.0
2018	Oklahoma City	6	6	41.9	.408	.365	.861	6.0	2.7	1.3	.7	24.7
2019	Oklahoma City	5	5	40.8	.436	.319	.816	8.6	3.6	1.4	.2	**28.6**
2020	L.A. Clippers	13	13	36.8	.398	.333	.909	6.1	3.8	1.5	.5	20.2
2021	L.A. Clippers	**19**	**19**	40.9	.441	.336	.844	**9.6**	5.4	1.0	.5	26.9
2024	L.A. Clippers	6	6	37.1	.411	.367	.840	6.8	4.8	1.2	.5	19.5
2026	Philadelphia	11	11	35.8	**.458**	**.493**	.750	3.9	3.0	1.3	.5	16.4
Career		125	125	38.7	.425	.364	.823	7.2	4.0	1.5	.5	20.8

=== College ===
Year	Team	GP	GS	MPG	FG%	3P%	FT%	RPG	APG	SPG	BPG	PPG
2008–09	Fresno State	**34**	**34**	**34.6**	**.470**	**.447**	.697	6.2	1.9	1.7	**1.0**	14.3
2009–10	Fresno State	29	29	33.2	.424	.353	**.909**	**7.2**	**3.0**	**2.2**	.8	**16.8**
Career		63	63	33.9	.447	.396	.803	6.7	2.4	2.0	.9	15.5

== Personal life ==
George is married to former stripper Daniela Rajic. He once dated the daughter of coach Doc Rivers, who he later cheated on with Rajic. They were engaged in November 2020, and got married in June 2022. Together they have two daughters and a son named after him.

George is the co-host of a podcast called "Podcast P with Paul George" with actor Jackie Long and AAU teammate Dallas Rutherford, with NBA players such as Jalen Green, DeMar DeRozan, Karl-Anthony Towns, and Alperen Şengün making guest appearances on the show.

George signed with Nike as a rookie and had a signature footwear and apparel line from 2017 to 2022. In 2024, George announced that Nike would re-release his earlier sneaker models.

== See also ==
- List of NBA career steals leaders
- List of NBA career 3-point scoring leaders
- List of NBA career playoff 3-point scoring leaders
- List of NBA single-season 3-point scoring leaders
