= Deonte Burton (basketball, born 1994) =

American basketball player (born 1994)

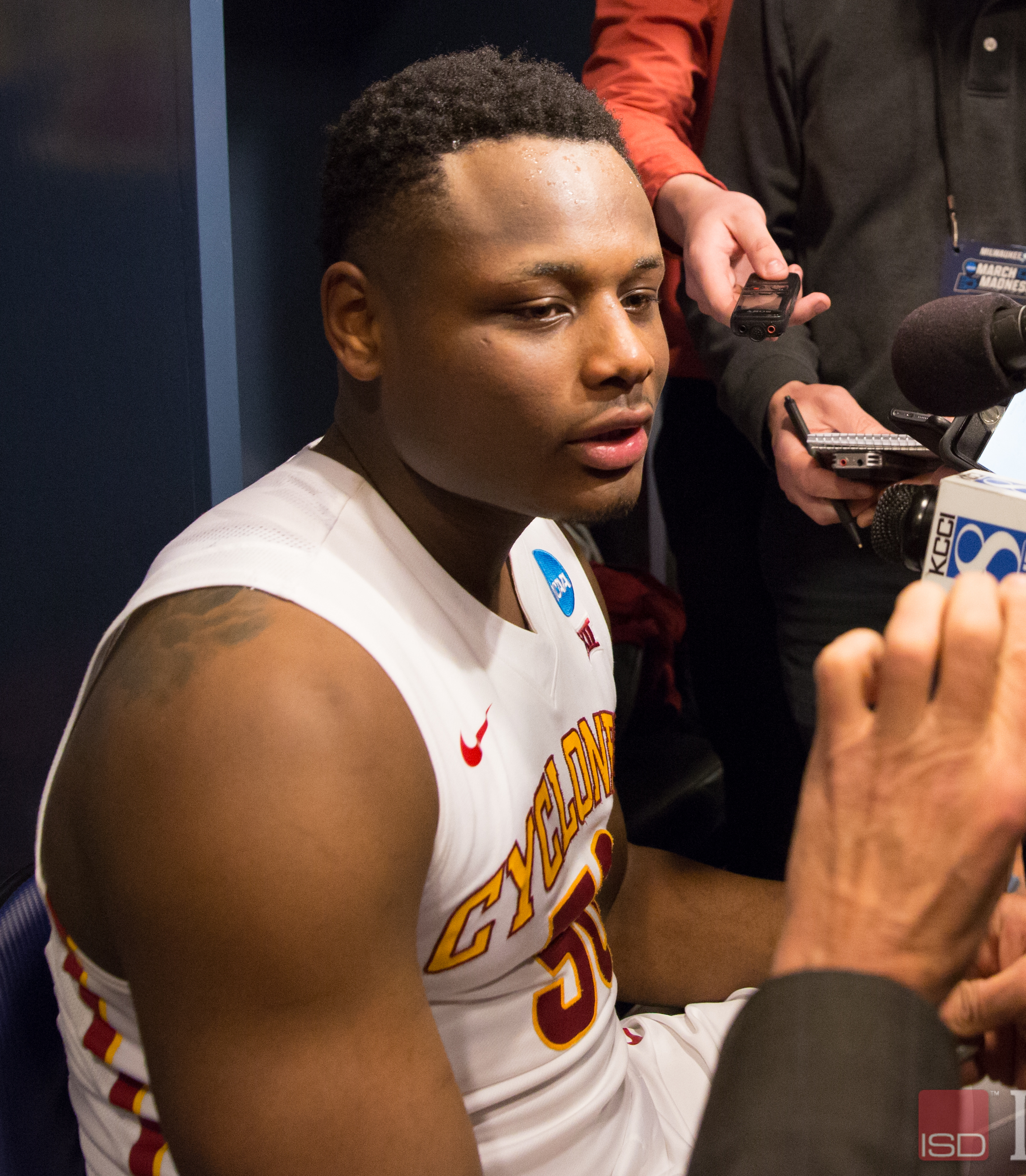
- Burton with the Iowa State Cyclones in 2017

No. 23 – NLEX Road Warriors
- Position: Small forward / power forward
- League: PBA

Personal information
- Born: January 31, 1994 (age 32) Milwaukee, Wisconsin, U.S.
- Listed height: 6 ft 4 in (1.93 m)
- Listed weight: 240 lb (109 kg)

Career information
- High school: Harold S. Vincent (Milwaukee, Wisconsin)
- College: Marquette (2013–2015); Iowa State (2015–2017)
- NBA draft: 2017: undrafted
- Playing career: 2017–present

Career history
- 2017–2018: Wonju DB Promy
- 2018–2020: Oklahoma City Thunder
- 2018–2019: →Oklahoma City Blue
- 2021–2022: Maine Celtics
- 2022–2023: Stockton Kings
- 2023: Sacramento Kings
- 2023–2024: Stockton Kings
- 2024: Mets de Guaynabo
- 2024: NBA G League United
- 2024–2025: Busan KCC Egis
- 2025: Anyang Jung Kwan Jang Red Boosters
- 2025: Osos de Manatí
- 2026: Guangzhou Loong Lions
- 2026–present: NLEX Road Warriors

Career highlights
- KBL Foreign MVP (2018); Second-team All-Big 12 (2017); Big 12 Newcomer of the Year (2016); Big East All-Rookie Team (2014)
- Stats at NBA.com
- Stats at Basketball Reference

Deonte DeAngelo Burton (born January 31, 1994) is an American professional basketball player for the NLEX Road Warriors of the Philippine Basketball Association (PBA). He played college basketball for the Marquette Golden Eagles and the Iowa State Cyclones.

== Early life ==
Deonte was born in Milwaukee, Wisconsin to Charles Burton and the late Barbara Malone. He has five brothers, Demario Burton, Omar Burton, Charles Grafton, Prentiss Grafton and Keylow Rogers and one sister Nicole Grafton.

After his freshman year at Harold S. Vincent, and when Deonte's mother was diagnosed with cancer he transferred back to Vincent to be close to family. After being recruited by Memphis, Rutgers, and others, Burton ultimately accepted a scholarship from Marquette to again stay close to home.

College recruiting
Name	Hometown	School	Height	Weight	Commit date
Deonte Burton; F	Milwaukee, WI	Centennial High School (Compton, CA) Vincent High School (WI)	6 ft 4 in (1.93 m)	228 lb (103 kg)	Sep 2, 2011
Deonte Burton; F	Recruit ratings: Scout: Rivals: 247Sports: ESPN: (88)				
Overall recruit ranking: Rivals: 52 11 (F) ESPN: 39, 2 (WI), 9 (F)
Note: In many cases, Scout, Rivals, 247Sports, On3, and ESPN may conflict in their listings of height and weight.; In these cases, the average was taken. ESPN grades are on a 100-point scale.; Sources: "Iowa State 2013 Basketball Commitments". Rivals.; "2013 Iowa State Basketball Commits". Scout.; "ESPN". ESPN.; "Scout.com Team Recruiting Rankings". Scout.; "2013 Team Ranking". Rivals.

== College career ==
=== Freshman season ===
As a freshman Burton was a rotation player off the bench. He averaged 6.9 points per game while earning a spot on the Big East All-Rookie team. He scored a season high 23 points against Xavier and scored in double figures in 13 games during the season.

=== Sophomore season ===
Burton only played in eight games at Marquette before deciding to transfer. During that time, he averaged 6.4 points and 40% from beyond the three-point arc. He transferred to Iowa State mid-season.

=== Junior season ===
After transferring mid-season, Burton had to sit out the first half of the 2015–16 season becoming eligible on December 19. During his 26 games and seven starts, Burton had an up and down season. He averaged 9.7 points and 3.9 rebounds and was able to secure 24 steals and 16 blocks. He was also named the Big 12 Newcomer of the Year. At the conclusion of the season Burton entered the NBA draft for evaluation but ultimately withdrew his name.

=== Senior season ===
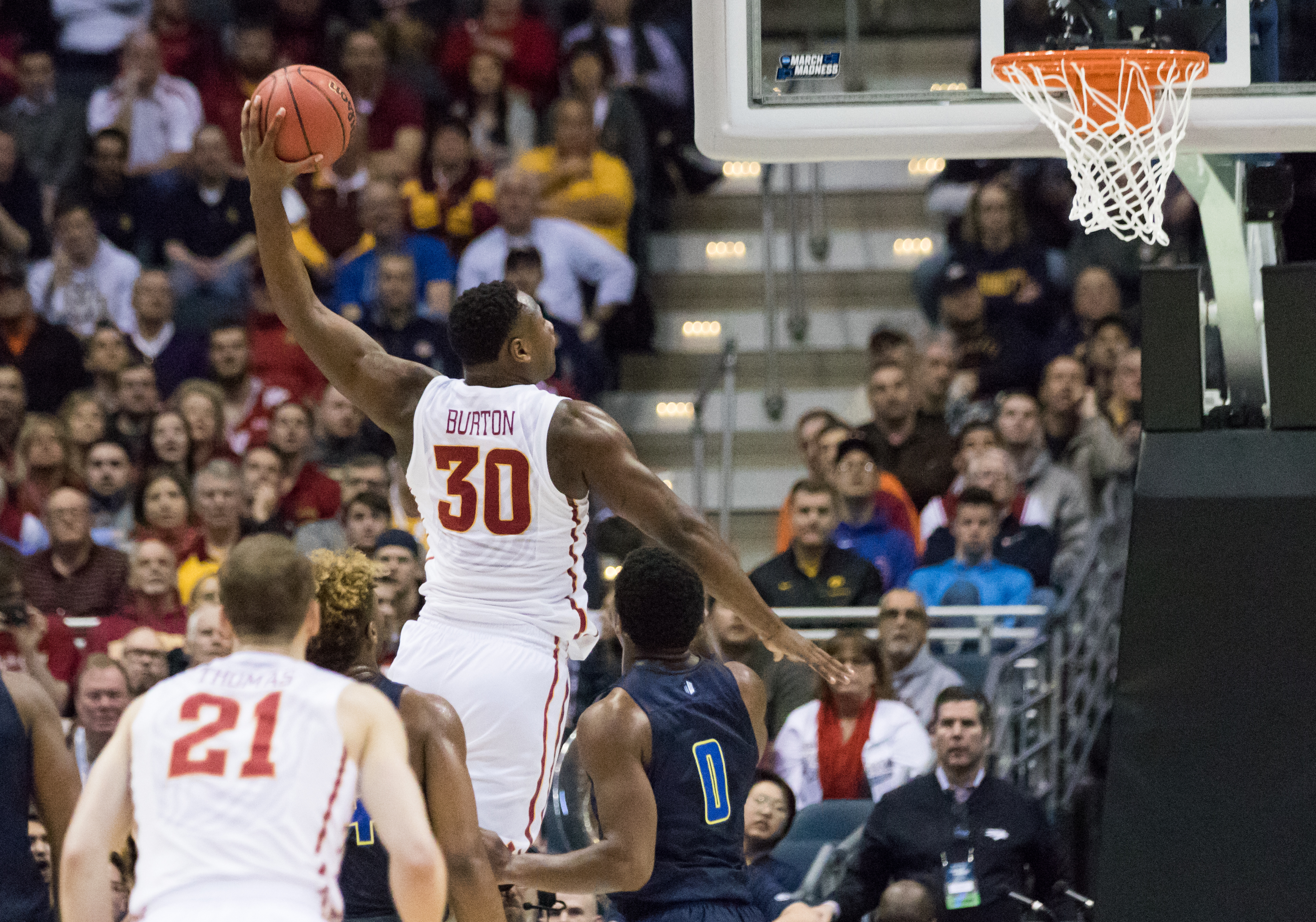
Burton dunking the ball in the 2017 NCAA Tournament

Burton's breakout season was his senior season. He started all 35 games for the Cyclones en route to averaging 15.1 points and 6.2 rebounds. His 60 steals tie for 16th most by a Cyclone in a single season. He scored a career high 31 points against Oklahoma. Burton scored 29 and hit a career best 7–9 three-pointers in a win at Kansas. At the conclusion of the season He was named to the Second-team All-Big 12. After the season he participated in the NABC's Reese's College All-Star game and the Portsmouth Invitational.

== Professional career ==
=== Wonju DB Promy (2017–2018) ===
Burton went undrafted in the 2017 NBA draft, but signed with the Minnesota Timberwolves for Summer League. He later signed with the Wonju DB Promy in South Korea's Korean Basketball League. In Burton's single season in Korea he averaged 23.8 Points, 3.8 Assists and 7 Rebounds, which earned him the K.B.L. Foreign MVP Award.

=== Oklahoma City Thunder (2018–2020) ===
Burton agreed to a two-way deal with the Oklahoma City Thunder on July 7, 2018.

On March 10, 2019, Burton was signed to a standard NBA contract.

=== Maine Celtics (2021–2022) ===
On December 21, 2021, Burton was acquired by the Maine Celtics of the NBA G League.

=== Sacramento / Stockton Kings (2022–2024) ===
On November 3, 2022, Burton was named to the opening night roster for the Stockton Kings.

On January 30, 2023, Burton signed a 10-day contract with the Sacramento Kings. However, the Kings waived him on February 8, and he was re-acquired by Stockton.

On October 2, 2023, Burton re-signed with Sacramento, but was waived on October 12. On November 9, he was named to the opening night roster for the Stockton Kings.

=== Mets de Guaynabo (2024) ===
On April 26, 2024, Burton signed with the Mets de Guaynabo of the Baloncesto Superior Nacional.

=== Busan KCC Egis (2024–2025) ===
On August 21, 2024, Burton signed with the Busan KCC Egis of the Korean Basketball League (KBL).

=== Anyang Jung Kwan Jang Red Boosters (2025) ===
On January 10, 2025, Burton was traded to the Anyang Jung Kwan Jang Red Boosters in exchange for Cady Lalanne.

== Career statistics ==
=== NBA ===
==== Regular season ====
Year	Team	GP	GS	MPG	FG%	3P%	FT%	RPG	APG	SPG	BPG	PPG
2018–19	Oklahoma City	32	0	7.5	.402	.296	.667	.9	.3	.2	.3	2.6
2019–20	Oklahoma City	39	0	9.1	.344	.189	.571	1.5	.4	.2	.3	2.7
2022–23	Sacramento	2	0	3.0	.000	.000	—	.0	.0	.0	.0	.0
Career		73	0	8.2	.364	.222	.615	1.2	.4	.2	.2	2.5

==== Playoffs ====
Year	Team	GP	GS	MPG	FG%	3P%	FT%	RPG	APG	SPG	BPG	PPG
2019	Oklahoma City	3	0	1.3	.200	.000	—	.7	.0	.0	.0	.7
2020	Oklahoma City	1	0	2.0	—	—	—	.0	.0	.0	.0	.0
Career		4	0	1.5	.200	.000	—	.5	.0	.0	.0	.5

=== College statistics ===
Year	Team	GP	GS	MPG	FG%	3P%	FT%	RPG	APG	SPG	BPG	PPG
2013–14	Marquette	32	3	12.6	.477	.500	.647	2.2	0.5	1.1	0.4	6.9
2014–15	Marquette	8	8	16.1	.500	.400	.765	1.4	0.3	1.3	0.4	6.4
2015–16	Iowa State	26	7	18.8	.533	.474	.635	3.9	1.0	0.9	0.6	9.7
2016–17	Iowa State	35	35	29.5	.456	.375	.675	6.2	1.8	1.7	1.4	15.1
Career		101	53	20.3	.478	.405	.664	4.0	1.1	1.3	0.8	10.4
