= 2018–19 Oklahoma City Thunder season =

NBA professional basketball team season

- Head coach: Billy Donovan
- General manager: Sam Presti
- Owners: Professional Basketball Club LLC
- Arena: Chesapeake Energy Arena

Results
- Record: 49–33 (.598)
- Place: Division: 4th (Northwest); Conference: 6th (Western)
- Playoff finish: First round (lost to Trail Blazers 1–4)
- Stats at Basketball Reference

Local media
- Television: Fox Sports Oklahoma
- Radio: KWPN; WWLS-FM

The 2018–19 Oklahoma City Thunder season was the 11th season of the franchise in Oklahoma City and the 53rd in the National Basketball Association (NBA). Nick Collison (who had been with the franchise since it was based in Seattle), retired in May 2018 and was not on the roster for the first time since the 2002–03 season. The only remaining former SuperSonics' active players are Jeff Green and Kevin Durant, both of whom played their rookie seasons with the team in Seattle. Collison's retirement also left Russell Westbrook as the longest tenured Thunder player and last remaining player on the roster from the 2011–12 season in which they won the Western Conference and went to the NBA Finals. On March 20, 2019, the Thunder retired Collison's No. 4 jersey, becoming the first Thunder player and the last former Sonic player to have their jersey retired. The Thunder had the fourth best team defensive rating in the NBA.

Despite speculation that Paul George would sign with his hometown team, the Los Angeles Lakers, in the off-season, George instead re-signed with the Thunder on June 30, 2018, exactly a year after he was traded to the team from the Indiana Pacers. The Thunder then clinched another playoff season due to the Kings loss to the Rockets on March 30.

In the playoffs, the Thunder were eliminated by the Portland Trail Blazers in the First Round thanks to a Damian Lillard series-clinching three pointer over Paul George in Game 5. This marked the third consecutive season the Thunder was eliminated in the First Round. After 11 years, this season also marked the end of an era as Russell Westbrook was traded to the Houston Rockets following this season, and reunited him with former Thunder teammate James Harden, whom had played for the team from the 2009 to 2012 seasons.

== Previous season ==
The Thunder finished the 2017–18 season 48–34 to finish in second place in the Northwest Division, fourth in the Western Conference and qualified for the playoffs. Last season featured the acquisitions of Paul George and Carmelo Anthony to a form a "Big Three" with reigning MVP Russell Westbrook. The Thunder however fell in the first round to the Utah Jazz in six games.

== Offseason ==
=== Draft picks ===
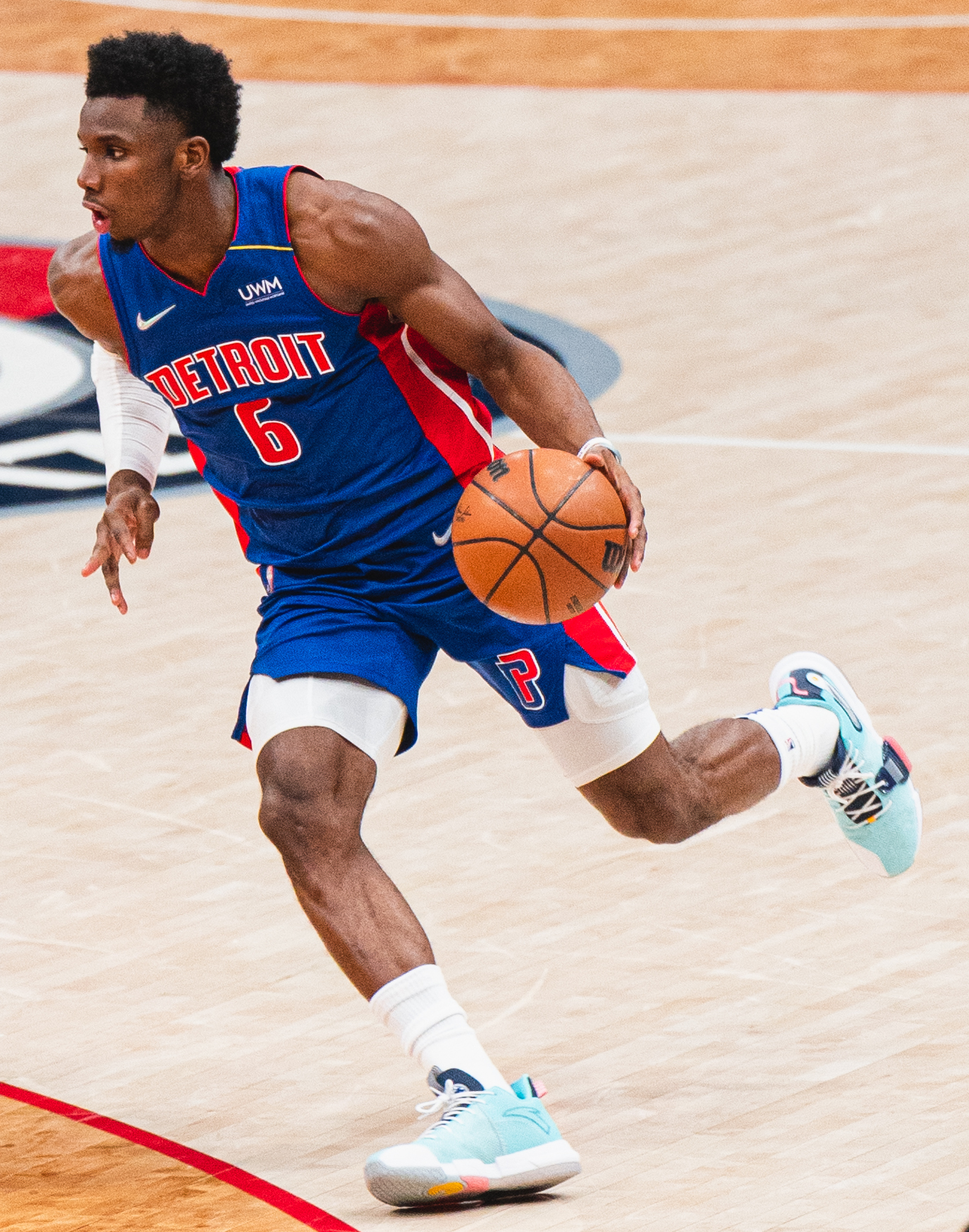
Hamidou Diallo was traded to the Oklahoma City Thunder.

Round	Pick	Player	Position	Nationality	College
2	53	Devon Hall	SG	United States	Virginia
2	57	Kevin Hervey	PF	United States	UT Arlington
Hamidou Diallo was later traded to the Thunder via Charlotte Hornets

The Thunder had two second-round picks entering the draft. The Thunder traded their 2018 first-round pick in the Enes Kanter trade to the Utah Jazz back in 2015 which was later traded by the Jazz to the Minnesota Timberwolves. The Thunder's other second-round pick was originally acquired from the Boston Celtics as a result of the Perry Jones trade in 2015.

On draft night, the Thunder traded a 2019 second-round pick and cash considerations to the Charlotte Hornets in exchange for the draft rights to Hamidou Diallo, the forty-fifth pick. The trade was later finalized on July 6.

The Thunder, after the 2018 NBA draft night and the conclusion of player acquisitions and transactions, ended with Kentucky guard Hamidou Diallo, Virginia guard Devon Hall and Texas-Arlington forward Kevin Hervey.

=== Trades ===
On July 20, the Thunder traded Dakari Johnson and cash considerations to the Orlando Magic in exchange for Rodney Purvis in an effort for payroll relief. By trading Johnson's guaranteed contract for Purvis's non-guaranteed contract, the Thunder saved nearly $6.6 million in luxury tax savings. On July 23, the Thunder then traded Rodney Purvis to the Boston Celtics in exchange for Abdel Nader and cash considerations.

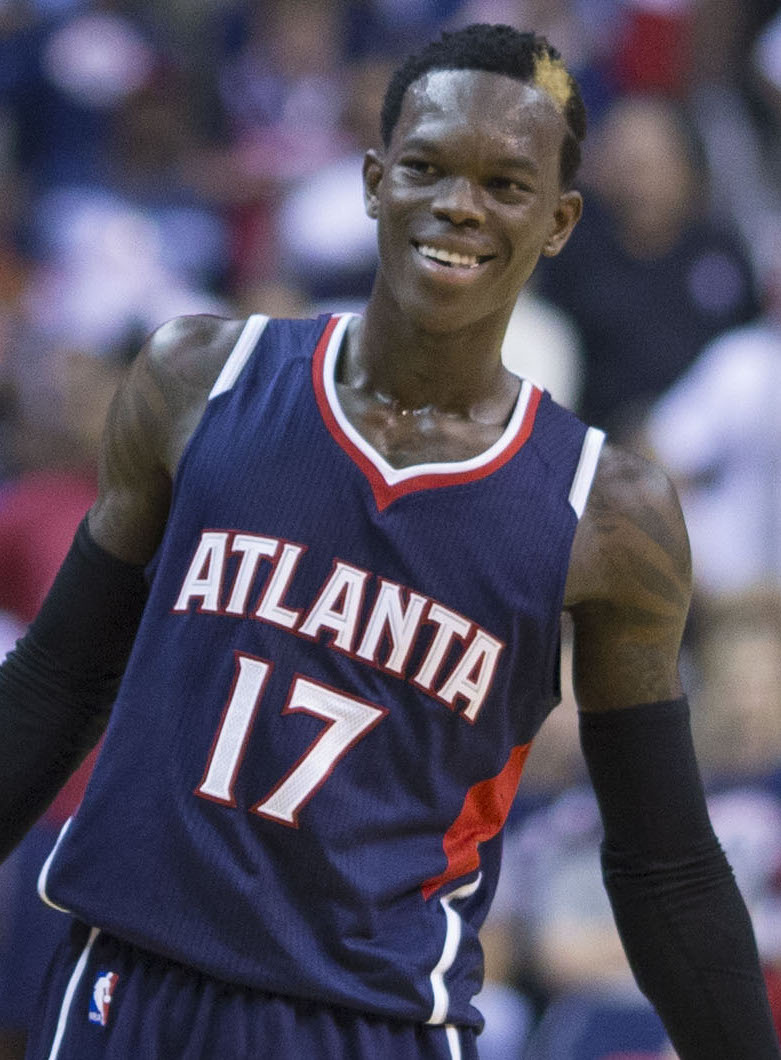
Dennis Schröder was traded to the Thunder.

On July 25, the Thunder traded Carmelo Anthony and a 2022 protected first-round pick to the Atlanta Hawks in a three team trade, for Dennis Schröder from Atlanta and Timothé Luwawu-Cabarrot from Philadelphia. Coming off his lowest scoring season, Anthony saw his role and playing time dwindle during the season and playoffs. After the season ended, Anthony rejected the idea of coming off the bench, saying it was "out of the question", while preferring to play with the ball in his hands more. Following the Thunder's defeat against the Utah Jazz, Anthony was the focal point of trade talks in order to save on the luxury tax bill for next season.

I want to take this opportunity to thank Carmelo Anthony and acknowledge his professionalism and contributions during his time with the Thunder. Although his tenure was only one year, the fact that Melo is a part of our history is important to us. We appreciate Carmelo and his agent Leon Rose for their collaboration and communication as we worked to resolve the situation in a fashion that was suitable to everyone. We wish Melo and his family nothing but the best in the future.

— Sam Presti

In exchange for Anthony, the Thunder received Dennis Schröder and Timothé Luwawu-Cabarrot. Schröder came off the 2017-18 season as the leading scorer for the Hawks, averaging 19.4 points. The past two seasons, Schröder had developed into a starter leading the Hawks to a playoff appearance in 2017. Luwawu-Cabarrot came to the Thunder after two seasons with the 76ers since being selected 24th overall in the 2016 NBA draft.

=== Free agency ===
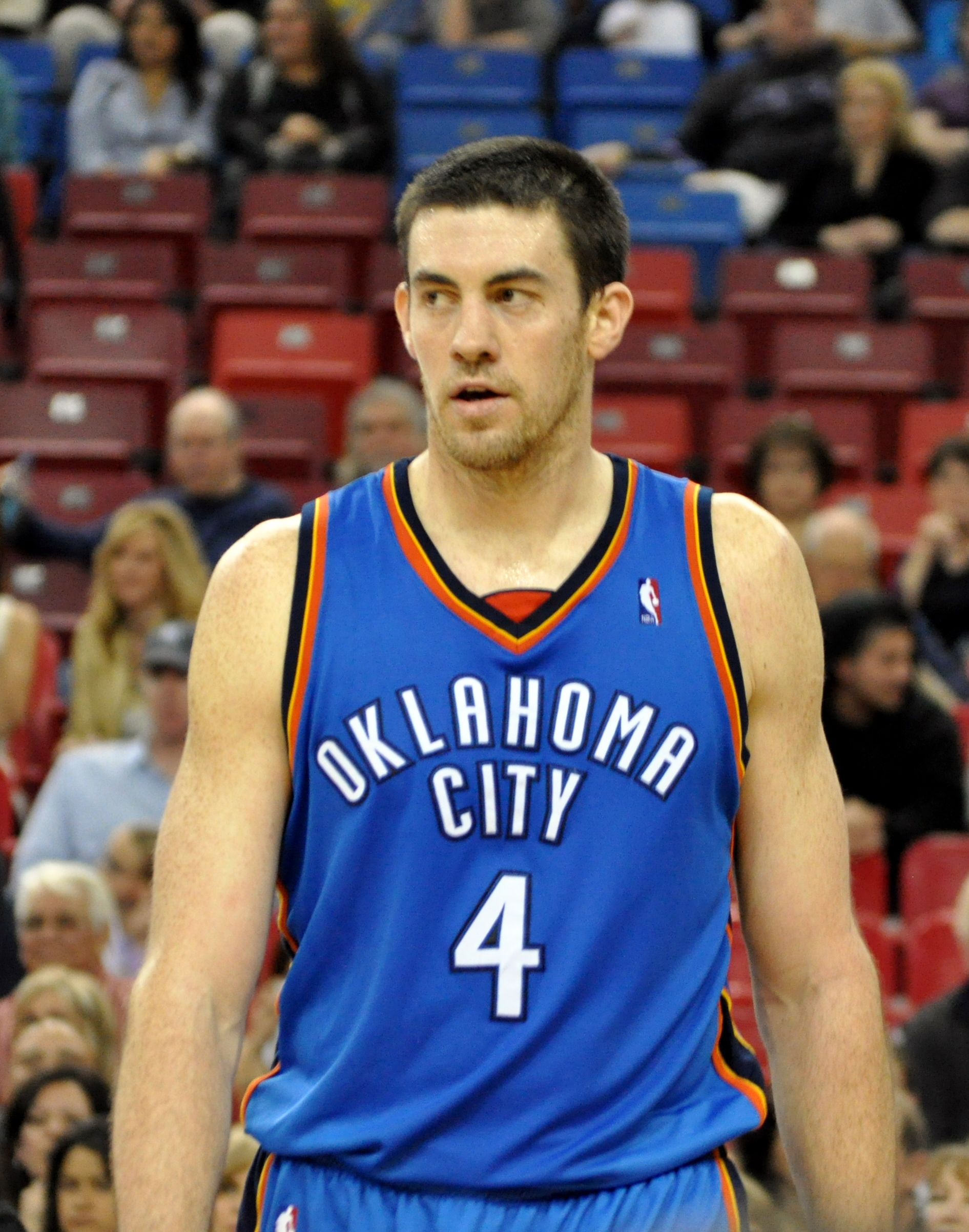
Nick Collison spent 15 seasons with the Thunder.

For this offseason, free agency began on July 1, 2018, while the July moratorium ended on July 6. Corey Brewer, Nick Collison, Raymond Felton, P.J. Dozier, Paul George, Jerami Grant, Daniel Hamilton and Josh Huestis were set to hit unrestricted free agency. On May 10, Nick Collison announced his retirement after 15 years with the Thunder dating back to the Seattle SuperSonics. Collison appeared in 910 games and 91 playoff games with career averages of 5.9 points, 5.2 rebounds and 1.0 assists.

For the Thunder, Nick Collison was one of those players. Nick has helped define the standards we work by on a day-to-day basis, on and off the court and has become synonymous with the Thunder shield. He is a craftsman; tough, selfless and humble. He brought the best of himself his entire career each day he walked through the door. As result of his consistency and longevity, his contributions to our culture and community will have a lasting effect. That is rare in any industry, but especially professional sports. Many thanks to Nick and his wonderful family for being such an important part to writing our history and helping to set the course. In doing so, he has set the standards for professionalism and consistency for the years ahead and therefore, will always be part of the Thunder.

— Sam Presti

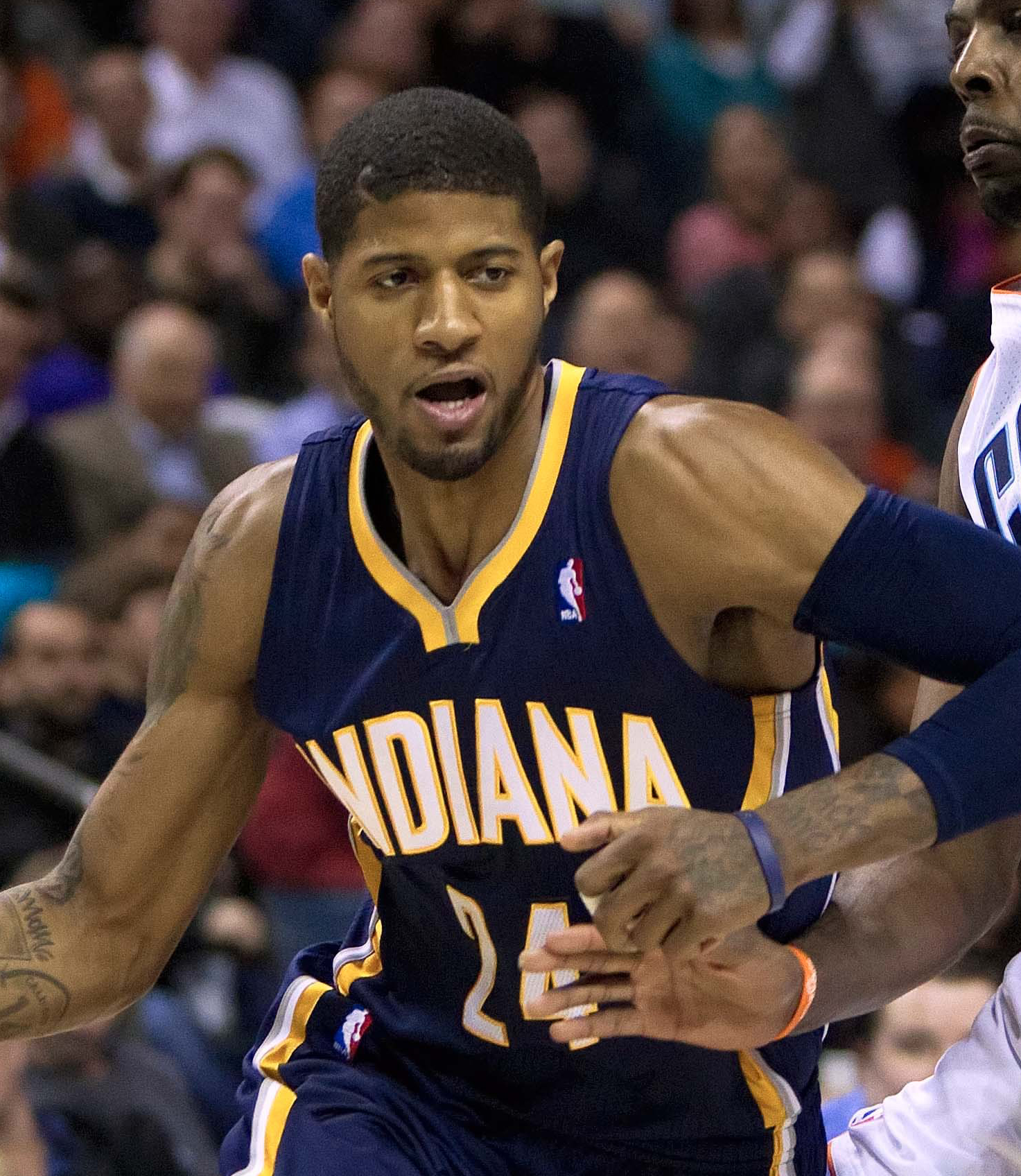
Paul George was re-signed to a multi-year contract.

On June 30, it was reported that Paul George agreed to a four-year, $137 million deal to stay with the Thunder, which he later signed on July 6. After informing the Indiana Pacers that he would not re-sign with them, opting to join the Los Angeles Lakers in free agency, the Thunder spent the year recruiting George to sign long-term after trading for him. Since the 2017-18 season ended, the Thunder convinced George to stay, hinging his trust on Sam Presti and his strong relationship with Russell Westbrook.

Here they have made a huge risk in trading for me, knowing I have one year on my deal. But I felt I didn't finish as strong as I could have. Just knowing you left something on the table, even to this point now, it weighs on me.

— Paul George

The same night on June 30, it was reported that Jerami Grant agreed to a three-year, $27 million deal to stay with the Thunder, which he later signed on July 7. On July 3, it was reported that Raymond Felton agreed to a new contract to stay with the Thunder, which he later signed on July 12. Brewer, Dozier, Hamilton and Huestis, who were not re-signed, joined the Philadelphia 76ers, Boston Celtics, Atlanta Hawks and the Austin Spurs of the NBA G League respectively.

On July 2, it was reported that Nerlens Noel agreed to a two-year, minimum deal with the Thunder, which he later signed on July 6. Noel spent the 2017-18 season with the Dallas Mavericks. On July 7, Deonte Burton signed a two-way contract with the Thunder. Burton spent the 2017–18 season with the Wonju DB Promy in the Korean Basketball League before playing for the Thunder in the 2018 NBA Summer League. To fill in the other slot, Tyler Davis signed a two-way contract with the Thunder on August 13. Davis came undrafted out of Texas A&M.

On August 31, Kyle Singler was waived by the Thunder with the stretch provision. By waiving Singler, the Thunder saved more than $20 million in luxury taxes.

=== Front office and coaching changes ===
On August 20, the Thunder announced Bob Beyer as an assistant coach. Beyer joins the Thunder after serving as an assistant coach with the Detroit Pistons with most recently being the associate head coach for the last two seasons.

== Roster ==
2018–19 Oklahoma City Thunder roster
Players

Pos.	No.	Player	Height	Weight	DOB	From
C	12	Steven Adams	6 ft 11 in (2.11 m)	265 lb (120 kg)	1993-07-20	Pittsburgh
SG	30	Deonte Burton	6 ft 5 in (1.96 m)	245 lb (111 kg)	1994-01-31	Iowa State
SG	6	Hamidou Diallo	6 ft 5 in (1.96 m)	198 lb (90 kg)	1998-07-31	Kentucky
PG	8	Jawun Evans (TW)	6 ft 0 in (1.83 m)	190 lb (86 kg)	1996-07-26	Oklahoma State
PG	2	Raymond Felton	6 ft 1 in (1.85 m)	205 lb (93 kg)	1984-06-26	North Carolina
SG	23	Terrance Ferguson	6 ft 7 in (2.01 m)	190 lb (86 kg)	1998-05-17	Advanced Prep International (TX)
SF	13	Paul George	6 ft 8 in (2.03 m)	220 lb (100 kg)	1990-05-02	Fresno State
PF	9	Jerami Grant	6 ft 9 in (2.06 m)	220 lb (100 kg)	1994-03-12	Syracuse
SF	15	Donte Grantham (TW)	6 ft 8 in (2.03 m)	215 lb (98 kg)	1995-03-19	Clemson
PF	5	Markieff Morris	6 ft 9 in (2.06 m)	245 lb (111 kg)	1989-09-02	Kansas
SF	11	Abdel Nader	6 ft 6 in (1.98 m)	225 lb (102 kg)	1993-09-25	Iowa State
C	3	Nerlens Noel	6 ft 11 in (2.11 m)	230 lb (104 kg)	1994-04-10	Kentucky
PF	54	Patrick Patterson	6 ft 9 in (2.06 m)	230 lb (104 kg)	1989-03-14	Kentucky
SG	21	André Roberson	6 ft 7 in (2.01 m)	210 lb (95 kg)	1991-12-04	Colorado
PG	17	Dennis Schröder	6 ft 1 in (1.85 m)	172 lb (78 kg)	1993-09-15	Germany
PG	0	Russell Westbrook	6 ft 3 in (1.91 m)	200 lb (91 kg)	1988-11-12	UCLA

Coaches
Head coach
- Billy Donovan
Assistant(s)
- Bob Beyer
- Vin Bhavnani
- Mark Bryant
- Maurice Cheeks
- Darko Rajaković

Legend
- (DP) Unsigned draft pick
- (FA) Free agent
- (S) Suspended
- (GL) On assignment to G League affiliate
- (TW) Two-way affiliate player
- Injured

Roster
Updated: March 27, 2019

=== Salaries ===
Player	Salary
Russell Westbrook	$35,654,150
Paul George	$30,560,700
Steven Adams	$24,157,304
Dennis Schroder	$15,500,000
Andre Roberson	$10,000,000
Jerami Grant	$8,653,847
Patrick Patterson	$5,451,600
Alex Abrines ^{‡}	$3,575,183
Raymond Felton	$2,393,887
Terrance Ferguson	$2,118,840
Nerlens Noel	$1,757,429
Abdel Nader	$1,378,242
Kyle Singler ^{‡}	$999,200
Hamidou Diallo	$838,464
Markieff Morris	$573,295
Deonte Burton	$151,587
Scotty Hopson ^{‡}	$85,458
Richard Solomon ^{‡}	$47,371
Total	$134,896,557

All 2018-19 salaries.
^{‡} Waived with guaranteed money

== Standings ==
=== Conference ===
Western Conference
#	Team	W	L	PCT	GB	GP
1	c – Golden State Warriors *	57	25	.695	–	82
2	y – Denver Nuggets *	54	28	.659	3.0	82
3	x – Portland Trail Blazers	53	29	.646	4.0	82
4	y – Houston Rockets *	53	29	.646	4.0	82
5	x – Utah Jazz	50	32	.610	7.0	82
6	x – Oklahoma City Thunder	49	33	.598	8.0	82
7	x – San Antonio Spurs	48	34	.585	9.0	82
8	x – Los Angeles Clippers	48	34	.585	9.0	82
9	Sacramento Kings	39	43	.476	18.0	82
10	Los Angeles Lakers	37	45	.451	20.0	82
11	Minnesota Timberwolves	36	46	.439	21.0	82
12	Memphis Grizzlies	33	49	.402	24.0	82
13	New Orleans Pelicans	33	49	.402	24.0	82
14	Dallas Mavericks	33	49	.402	24.0	82
15	Phoenix Suns	19	63	.232	38.0	82

=== Division ===
Northwest Division	W	L	PCT	GB	Home	Road	Div	GP
y – Denver Nuggets	54	28	.659	–	34‍–‍7	20‍–‍21	12–4	82
x – Portland Trail Blazers	53	29	.646	1.0	32‍–‍9	21‍–‍20	6–10	82
x – Utah Jazz	50	32	.610	4.0	29‍–‍12	21‍–‍20	8–8	82
x – Oklahoma City Thunder	49	33	.598	5.0	27‍–‍14	22‍–‍19	9–7	82
Minnesota Timberwolves	36	46	.439	18.0	25‍–‍16	11‍–‍30	5–11	82

== Game log ==
=== Preseason ===
2018 preseason game log
Total: 3–1 (home: 2–1; road: 1–0)
Preseason: 3–1 (home: 2–1; road: 1–0)

Game	Date	Team	Score	High points	High rebounds	High assists	Location Attendance	Record
1	October 3	Detroit	L 91–97	Dennis Schroder (21)	Steven Adams (12)	Dennis Schroder (9)	Chesapeake Energy Arena; 18,203	0–1
2	October 5	@ Minnesota	W 113–101	Paul George (23)	Steven Adams (13)	Dennis Schroder (6)	Target Center; 9,807	1–1
3	October 7	Atlanta	W 113–94	Paul George (22)	Steven Adams (9)	Dennis Schroder (6)	BOK Center; 14,470	2–1
4	October 9	Milwaukee	W 119–115 (OT)	Paul George (26)	Nerlens Noel (14)	Abdul Gaddy (5)	Chesapeake Energy Arena; 18,203	3–1

2018–19 season schedule

=== Regular season ===
2018–19 game log
Total: 49–33 (home: 27–14; road: 22–19)
October: 2–4 (home: 2–2; road: 0–2)

Game	Date	Team	Score	High points	High rebounds	High assists	Location Attendance	Record
1	October 16	@ Golden State	L 100–108	Paul George (27)	Steven Adams (11)	Dennis Schroder (6)	Oracle Arena; 19,596	0–1
2	October 19	@ LA Clippers	L 92–108	Paul George (20)	Steven Adams (18)	Dennis Schroder (8)	Staples Center; 14,816	0–2
3	October 21	Sacramento	L 120–131	Russell Westbrook (32)	Steven Adams (14)	Russell Westbrook (8)	Chesapeake Energy Arena; 18,203	0–3
4	October 25	Boston	L 95–101	Paul George (22)	Russell Westbrook (15)	Russell Westbrook (8)	Chesapeake Energy Arena; 18,203	0–4
5	October 28	Phoenix	W 117–110	Russell Westbrook (23)	Nerlens Noel (15)	Russell Westbrook (7)	Chesapeake Energy Arena; 18,203	1–4
6	October 30	LA Clippers	W 128–110	George & Westbrook (32)	Paul George (12)	Russell Westbrook (9)	Chesapeake Energy Arena; 18,203	2–4

November : 12–3 (home: 7–1; road: 5–2)

Game	Date	Team	Score	High points	High rebounds	High assists	Location Attendance	Record
7	November 1	@ Charlotte	W 111–107	Russell Westbrook (29)	Steven Adams (12)	Russell Westbrook (10)	Spectrum Center; 14,583	3–4
8	November 2	@ Washington	W 134–111	Russell Westbrook (23)	Nerlens Noel (7)	Russell Westbrook (12)	Capital One Arena; 20,409	4–4
9	November 5	New Orleans	W 122–116	Paul George (23)	Steven Adams (8)	Russell Westbrook (9)	Chesapeake Energy Arena; 18,203	5–4
10	November 7	@ Cleveland	W 95–86	Dennis Schroder (28)	Steven Adams (13)	George & Adams & Ferguson & Felton (2)	Quicken Loans Arena; 19,432	6–4
11	November 8	Houston	W 98–80	Paul George (20)	Paul George(11)	Paul George (6)	Chesapeake Energy Arena; 18,203	7–4
12	November 10	@ Dallas	L 96–111	George & Adams (20)	George & Adams (13)	Paul George (6)	American Airlines Center; 19,818	7–5
13	November 12	Phoenix	W 118–101	Paul George (32)	Paul George (8)	Dennis Schroder (9)	Chesapeake Energy Arena; 18,203	8–5
14	November 14	New York	W 128–103	Paul George (35)	Paul George (7)	Dennis Schroder (12)	Chesapeake Energy Arena; 18,203	9–5
15	November 17	@ Phoenix	W 110–100	Paul George (32)	Paul George (11)	Dennis Schroder (7)	Talking Stick Resort Arena; 16,376	10–5
16	November 19	@ Sacramento	L 113–117	Russell Westbrook (29)	Steven Adams (15)	Russell Westbrook (7)	Golden 1 Center; 16,250	10–6
17	November 21	@ Golden State	W 123–95	Dennis Schroder (32)	Adams, Grant, Westbrook (11)	Russell Westbrook (13)	Oracle Arena; 19,596	11–6
18	November 23	Charlotte	W 109–104	Russell Westbrook (30)	Russell Westbrook (12)	Russell Westbrook (8)	Chesapeake Energy Arena; 18,203	12–6
19	November 24	Denver	L 98–105	Paul George (24)	Steven Adams (14)	Russell Westbrook (12)	Chesapeake Energy Arena; 18,203	12–7
20	November 28	Cleveland	W 100–83	Russell Westbrook (23)	Russell Westbrook (18)	Russell Westbrook (15)	Chesapeake Energy Arena; 18,203	13–7
21	November 30	Atlanta	W 124–109	Russell Westbrook (23)	Steven Adams (13)	Russell Westbrook (10)	Chesapeake Energy Arena; 18,203	14–7

December : 9–6 (home: 4–1; road: 5–5)

Game	Date	Team	Score	High points	High rebounds	High assists	Location Attendance	Record
22	December 3	@ Detroit	W 110–83	Steven Adams (21)	Paul George (10)	Schroder, Westbrook (6)	Little Caesars Arena; 14,372	15–7
23	December 5	@ Brooklyn	W 114–112	Paul George (47)	George & Westbrook (15)	Russell Westbrook (17)	Barclays Center; 13,161	16–7
24	December 7	@ Chicago	L 112–114	Russell Westbrook (24)	Russell Westbrook (17)	Russell Westbrook (13)	United Center; 19,842	16–8
25	December 10	Utah	W 122–113	Paul George (31)	Russell Westbrook (11)	Russell Westbrook (10)	Chesapeake Energy Arena; 18,203	17–8
26	December 12	@ New Orleans	L 114–118	Paul George (25)	Paul George (11)	Russell Westbrook (7)	Smoothie King Center; 14,450	17–9
27	December 14	@ Denver	L 98–109	Paul George (32)	Russell Westbrook (14)	Russell Westbrook (8)	Pepsi Center; 19,520	17–10
28	December 15	LA Clippers	W 110–104	Paul George (33)	Russell Westbrook (9)	Russell Westbrook (12)	Chesapeake Energy Arena; 18,203	18–10
29	December 17	Chicago	W 121–96	Paul George (24)	Russell Westbrook (16)	Russell Westbrook (11)	Chesapeake Energy Arena; 18,203	19–10
30	December 19	@ Sacramento	W 132–113	Paul George (43)	Steven Adams (23)	Russell Westbrook (17)	Golden 1 Center; 17,583	20–10
31	December 22	@ Utah	W 107–106	Paul George (43)	Paul George (14)	Russell Westbrook (9)	Vivint Smart Home Arena; 19,111	21–10
32	December 23	Minnesota	L 112–114	Paul George (31)	Paul George (11)	Russell Westbrook (10)	Chesapeake Energy Arena; 18,203	21–11
33	December 25	@ Houston	L 109–113	Paul George (28)	Paul George (14)	Russell Westbrook (9)	Toyota Center; 18,055	21–12
34	December 28	@ Phoenix	W 118–102	Russell Westbrook (40)	Steven Adams (13)	Russell Westbrook (8)	Talking Stick Resort Arena; 18,055	22–12
35	December 30	@ Dallas	L 103–105	Paul George (36)	Westbrook, Adams (9)	Russell Westbrook (8)	American Airlines Center; 20,380	22–13
36	December 31	Dallas	W 122–102	Russell Westbrook (32)	Steven Adams (13)	Russell Westbrook (11)	Chesapeake Energy Arena; 18,203	23–13

January : 9–5 (home: 4–3; road: 5–2)

Game	Date	Team	Score	High points	High rebounds	High assists	Location Attendance	Record
37	January 2	@ LA Lakers	W 107–100	Paul George (37)	Russell Westbrook (16)	Russell Westbrook (10)	Staples Center; 18,997	24–13
38	January 4	@ Portland	W 111–109	Paul George (37)	Steven Adams (12)	Russell Westbrook (7)	Moda Center; 19,393	25–13
39	January 6	Washington	L 98–116	Russell Westbrook (22)	Russell Westbrook (15)	Russell Westbrook (13)	Chesapeake Energy Arena; 18,203	25–14
40	January 8	Minnesota	L 117–119	Paul George (27)	Steven Adams (12)	Russell Westbrook (16)	Chesapeake Energy Arena; 18,203	25–15
41	January 10	@ San Antonio	L 147–154 (2OT)	Paul George (30)	Russell Westbrook (13)	Russell Westbrook (24)	AT&T Center; 18,354	25–16
42	January 12	San Antonio	W 122–112	Russell Westbrook (24)	Paul George (11)	Russell Westbrook (7)	Chesapeake Energy Arena; 18,203	26–16
43	January 15	@ Atlanta	L 126–142	Russell Westbrook (31)	Paul George (11)	Russell Westbrook (8)	State Farm Arena; 15,045	26–17
44	January 17	LA Lakers	L 128–138 (OT)	Paul George (27)	Steven Adams (15)	Russell Westbrook (13)	Chesapeake Energy Arena; 18,203	26–18
45	January 19	@ Philadelphia	W 117–115	Paul George (31)	Russell Westbrook (10)	Russell Westbrook (6)	Wells Fargo Center; 20,646	27–18
46	January 21	@ New York	W 127–109	Paul George (31)	Russell Westbrook (10)	Russell Westbrook (9)	Madison Square Garden; 19,493	28–18
47	January 22	Portland	W 123–114	Russell Westbrook (29)	Russell Westbrook (10)	Russell Westbrook (14)	Chesapeake Energy Arena; 18,203	29–18
48	January 24	New Orleans	W 122–116	Russell Westbrook (23)	Russell Westbrook (17)	Russell Westbrook (16)	Chesapeake Energy Arena; 18,203	30–18
49	January 27	Milwaukee	W 118–112	Paul George (36)	Russell Westbrook, George (13)	Russell Westbrook (11)	Chesapeake Energy Arena; 18,203	31–18
50	January 29	@ Orlando	W 126–117	Paul George (37)	Russell Westbrook (14)	Russell Westbrook (14)	Amway Center; 16,341	32–18

February : 6–5 (home: 4–2; road: 2–3)

Game	Date	Team	Score	High points	High rebounds	High assists	Location Attendance	Record
51	February 1	@ Miami	W 118–102	Paul George (43)	Russell Westbrook (12)	Russell Westbrook (14)	American Airlines Arena; 19,600	33–18
52	February 3	@ Boston	L 129–134	Paul George (37)	Russell Westbrook (12)	Russell Westbrook (16)	TD Garden; 18,624	33–19
53	February 5	Orlando	W 132–122	Paul George (39)	Russell Westbrook (15)	Russell Westbrook (16)	Chesapeake Energy Arena; 18,203	34–19
54	February 7	Memphis	W 117–95	Paul George (27)	Russell Westbrook (13)	Russell Westbrook (15)	Chesapeake Energy Arena; 18,203	35–19
55	February 9	@ Houston	W 117–112	Paul George (45)	Russell Westbrook (12)	Russell Westbrook (11)	Toyota Center; 18,061	36–19
56	February 11	Portland	W 120–111	Paul George (47)	Russell Westbrook (14)	Russell Westbrook (11)	Chesapeake Energy Arena; 18,203	37–19
57	February 14	@ New Orleans	L 122–131	Russell Westbrook (44)	Russell Westbrook (14)	Russell Westbrook (11)	Smoothie King Center; 15,686	37–20
All-Star Break
58	February 22	Utah	W 148–147 (2OT)	Paul George (45)	Russell Westbrook (15)	Russell Westbrook (8)	Chesapeake Energy Arena; 18,203	38–20
59	February 23	Sacramento	L 116–119	Russell Westbrook (41)	Paul George (13)	Paul George (5)	Chesapeake Energy Arena; 18,203	38–21
60	February 26	@ Denver	L 112–121	Paul George (25)	Russell Westbrook (14)	Russell Westbrook (9)	Pepsi Center; 18,378	38–22
61	February 28	Philadelphia	L 104–108	Grant, Westbrook (23)	Steven Adams (14)	Russell Westbrook (11)	Chesapeake Energy Arena; 18,203	38–23

March : 6–10 (home: 3–5; road: 3–5)

Game	Date	Team	Score	High points	High rebounds	High assists	Location Attendance	Record
62	March 2	@ San Antonio	L 102–116	Russell Westbrook (19)	Steven Adams (13)	Russell Westbrook (8)	AT&T Center; 18,439	38–24
63	March 3	Memphis	W 99–95	Russell Westbrook (22)	Steven Adams (26)	Dennis Schroder (6)	Chesapeake Energy Arena; 18,203	39–24
64	March 5	@ Minnesota	L 120–131	Paul George (25)	Russell Westbrook (13)	Russell Westbrook (6)	Target Center; 15,728	39–25
65	March 7	@ Portland	W 129–121 (OT)	Russell Westbrook (37)	Paul George (14)	Paul George (6)	Moda Center; 20,037	40–25
66	March 8	@ LA Clippers	L 110–118	Russell Westbrook (32)	Steven Adams (10)	Russell Westbrook (7)	Staples Center; 17,915	40–26
67	March 11	@ Utah	W 98–89	Dennis Schroder (24)	George, Westbrook (11)	Russell Westbrook (8)	Vivint Smart Home Arena; 18,306	41–26
68	March 13	Brooklyn	W 108–96	Russell Westbrook (31)	Russell Westbrook (12)	Russell Westbrook (11)	Chesapeake Energy Arena; 18,203	42–26
69	March 14	@ Indiana	L 106–108	Paul George (36)	Russell Westbrook (14)	Russell Westbrook (11)	Bankers Life Fieldhouse; 16,656	42–27
70	March 16	Golden State	L 88–110	Paul George (29)	Paul George (13)	Russell Westbrook (9)	Chesapeake Energy Arena; 18,203	42–28
71	March 18	Miami	L 107–116	Paul George (31)	Steven Adams (12)	Dennis Schroder (6)	Chesapeake Energy Arena; 18,203	42–29
72	March 20	Toronto	L 114–123 (OT)	Russell Westbrook (42)	Jerami Grant (14)	Russell Westbrook (6)	Chesapeake Energy Arena; 18,203	42–30
73	March 22	@ Toronto	W 116–109	Paul George (28)	Russell Westbrook (12)	Russell Westbrook (13)	Scotiabank Arena; 20,014	43–30
74	March 25	@ Memphis	L 103–115	Paul George (30)	Paul George (12)	Russell Westbrook (7)	FedExForum; 15,144	43–31
75	March 27	Indiana	W 107–99	Steven Adams (25)	Steven Adams (12)	Russell Westbrook (12)	Chesapeake Energy Arena; 18,203	44–31
76	March 29	Denver	L 105–115	Russell Westbrook (27)	George, Westbrook (9)	Russell Westbrook (9)	Chesapeake Energy Arena; 18,203	44–32
77	March 31	Dallas	L 103–106	Paul George (27)	Steven Adams (15)	Russell Westbrook (11)	Chesapeake Energy Arena; 18,203	44–33

April : 5–0 (home: 3–0; road: 2–0)

Game	Date	Team	Score	High points	High rebounds	High assists	Location Attendance	Record
78	April 2	LA Lakers	W 119–103	Jerami Grant (22)	Russell Westbrook (20)	Russell Westbrook (21)	Chesapeake Energy Arena; 18,203	45–33
79	April 5	Detroit	W 123–110	Paul George (30)	Steven Adams (14)	Russell Westbrook (15)	Chesapeake Energy Arena; 18,203	46–33
80	April 7	@ Minnesota	W 132–126	George, Westbrook (27)	Russell Westbrook (10)	Russell Westbrook (15)	Target Center; 18,978	47–33
81	April 9	Houston	W 112–111	Russell Westbrook (29)	Steven Adams (13)	Russell Westbrook (10)	Chesapeake Energy Arena; 18,203	48–33
82	April 10	@ Milwaukee	W 127–116	Dennis Schroder (32)	Russell Westbrook (11)	Russell Westbrook (17)	Fiserv Forum; 18,082	49–33

2018–19 season schedule

=== Playoffs ===
2019 playoff game log
First Round: 1–4 (home: 1–1; road: 0–3)

Game	Date	Team	Score	High points	High rebounds	High assists	Location Attendance	Series
1	April 14	@ Portland	L 99–104	Paul George (26)	George, Westbrook (10)	Russell Westbrook (10)	Moda Center; 19,886	0–1
2	April 16	@ Portland	L 94–114	Paul George (27)	Adams, Westbrook (9)	Russell Westbrook (11)	Moda Center; 20,041	0–2
3	April 19	Portland	W 120–108	Russell Westbrook (33)	Steven Adams (7)	Russell Westbrook (11)	Chesapeake Energy Arena; 18,203	1–2
4	April 21	Portland	L 98–111	Paul George (32)	Paul George (10)	Russell Westbrook (7)	Chesapeake Energy Arena; 18,203	1–3
5	April 23	@ Portland	L 115–118	Paul George (36)	Russell Westbrook (11)	Russell Westbrook (14)	Moda Center; 20,241	1–4

2019 playoff schedule

== Player statistics ==
Legend
GP	Games played	GS	Games started	MPG	Minutes per game
FG%	Field goal percentage	3P%	3-point field goal percentage	FT%	Free throw percentage
RPG	Rebounds per game	APG	Assists per game	SPG	Steals per game
BPG	Blocks per game	PPG	Points per game	**Bold**	Career high

=== Regular season ===
Oklahoma City Thunder statistics
Player	GP	GS	MPG	FG%	3P%	FT%	RPG	APG	SPG	BPG	PPG
Alex Abrines ^{‡}	31	2	19.0	35.7%	32.3%	92.3%	1.5	0.6	0.5	0.2	5.3
Steven Adams	80	80	33.4	59.5%	0.0%	50.0%	9.5	1.6	1.5	1.0	13.9
Deonte Burton	32	0	7.5	40.2%	29.6%	66.7%	0.9	0.3	0.2	0.3	2.6
Tyler Davis ^{‡}	1	0	1.0	0.0%	-	-	1.0	0.0	0.0	0.0	0.0
Hamidou Diallo	51	3	10.3	45.5%	16.7%	61.0%	1.9	0.3	0.4	0.2	3.7
Jawun Evans ^{≠}	1	0	1.0	0.0%	0.0%	-	0.0	0.0	0.0	0.0	0.0
Raymond Felton	33	0	11.5	40.7%	32.8%	92.3%	1.0	1.6	0.3	0.2	4.3
Terrance Ferguson	74	74	26.1	42.9%	36.6%	72.5%	1.9	1.0	0.5	0.2	6.9
Paul George	77	77	36.9	43.8%	38.6%	83.9%	8.2	4.1	2.2	0.4	28.0
Jerami Grant	80	77	32.7	49.7%	39.2%	71.0%	5.2	1.0	0.8	1.3	13.6
Donte Grantham ^{≠}	3	0	0.7	0.0%	0.0%	-	0.0	0.0	0.0	0.0	0.0
Timothé Luwawu-Cabarrot ^{†}	21	1	5.9	30.2%	22.7%	66.7%	0.9	0.2	0.2	0.0	1.7
Markieff Morris ^{≠}	24	1	16.1	39.1%	33.9%	73.7%	3.8	0.8	0.5	0.1	6.5
Abdel Nader	61	1	11.4	42.3%	32.0%	75.0%	1.9	0.3	0.3	0.2	4.0
Nerlens Noel	77	2	13.7	58.7%	-	68.4%	4.2	0.6	0.9	1.2	4.9
Patrick Patterson	63	5	13.7	37.4%	33.6%	63.3%	2.3	0.5	0.3	0.2	3.6
André Roberson	-	-	-	-	-	-	-	-	-	-	-
Dennis Schröder	79	14	29.3	41.4%	34.1%	81.9%	3.6	4.1	0.8	0.2	15.5
Russell Westbrook	73	73	36.0	42.8%	29.0%	65.6%	11.1	10.7	1.9	0.5	22.9

Led team in statistic

After all games.
^{‡} Waived during the season
^{†} Traded during the season
^{≠} Acquired during the season

=== Playoffs ===
Oklahoma City Thunder statistics
Player	GP	GS	MPG	FG%	3P%	FT%	RPG	APG	SPG	BPG	PPG
Steven Adams	5	5	31.8	66.7%	0.0%	37.5%	7.2	1.4	1.0	1.0	11.8
Deonte Burton	3	0	1.3	20.0%	0.0%	-	0.7	0.0	0.0	0.0	0.7
Raymond Felton	5	0	11.4	30.8%	25.0%	50.0%	0.6	0.6	0.8	0.2	2.2
Terrance Ferguson	5	5	25.6	36.0%	38.9%	-	2.4	1.2	0.4	0.0	5.0
Paul George	5	5	40.8	43.6%	31.9%	81.6%	8.6	3.6	1.4	0.2	28.6
Jerami Grant	5	5	35.2	50.0%	45.0%	69.2%	5.6	0.8	0.6	2.0	11.6
Markieff Morris	5	0	11.8	31.3%	28.6%	77.8%	2.6	1.0	0.2	0.6	3.8
Abdel Nader	3	0	1.7	50.0%	-	-	0.0	0.0	0.0	0.3	0.7
Nerlens Noel	5	0	12.0	60.0%	-	0.0%	3.8	0.0	0.4	0.6	4.8
Dennis Schröder	5	0	30.2	45.5%	30.0%	72.2%	3.2	3.4	0.8	0.0	13.8
Russell Westbrook	5	5	39.4	36.0%	32.4%	88.5%	8.8	10.6	1.0	0.6	22.8

Led team in statistic

After all games.

=== Individual game highs ===
Category	Player	Statistic
Points	Paul George; Paul George	47 vs Nets on December 5, 2018; 47 vs Trail Blazers on February 11, 2019
Rebounds	Steven Adams	23 vs Kings on December 19, 2018
Assists	Russell Westbrook	24 vs Spurs on January 10, 2019
Steals	Paul George; Russell Westbrook; Russell Westbrook; Russell Westbrook; Paul George	6 vs Rockets on November 8, 2018; 6 vs Clippers on December 15, 2018; 6 vs Kings on December 19, 2018; 6 vs Mavericks on December 30, 2018; 6 vs Nuggets on February 26, 2019
Blocks	Jerami Grant; Nerlens Noel; Steven Adams	5 vs Bucks on January 27, 2019; 5 vs Magic on January 29, 2019; 5 vs Lakers on April 2, 2019
Minutes	Paul George	50:26 vs Jazz on February 22, 2019

Category	Player	Statistic
Field goals made	Russell Westbrook	18 vs Pelicans on February 14, 2019
Threes made	Paul George	10 vs Heat on February 1, 2019
Free throws made	Paul George	17 vs Trail Blazers on March 7, 2019
Double-Doubles	Russell Westbrook	57
Triple-Doubles	Russell Westbrook	34

== Transactions ==
=== Overview ===
Players Added

Via trade

- Hamidou Diallo
  (Draft rights)
- Abdel Nader
- Dennis Schröder
- Timothé Luwawu-Cabarrot

Via free agency

- Deonte Burton
- Tyler Davis
- Nerlens Noel
Players Lost

Via trade

- Carmelo Anthony
- Dakari Johnson

Via free agency

- Corey Brewer
- Daniel Hamilton
- Josh Huestis
- PJ Dozier

Via retirement

- Nick Collison

Waived

- Kyle Singler

=== Trades ===
July 6, 2018	To Oklahoma City Thunder Draft rights to Hamidou Diallo	To Charlotte Hornets 2019 second-round pick Cash considerations
July 20, 2018	To Oklahoma City Thunder Rodney Purvis	To Orlando Magic Dakari Johnson; Cash considerations
July 23, 2018	To Oklahoma City Thunder Abdel Nader; Cash considerations	To Boston Celtics Rodney Purvis
July 25, 2018	To Oklahoma City Thunder Timothé Luwawu-Cabarrot via PHI; Dennis Schröder via ATL	To Atlanta Hawks Justin Anderson via PHI; Carmelo Anthony via OKC; 2022 first-round pick via OKC
July 25, 2018	To Philadelphia 76ers Mike Muscala via ATL
February 1, 2019	To Oklahoma City Thunder 2020 protected second-round pick	To Chicago Bulls Timothé Luwawu-Cabarrot; Cash considerations

=== Free agency ===
==== Re-signed ====
Date	Player	Contract
July 6, 2018	Paul George	Multi-Year
July 7, 2018	Jerami Grant	Multi-Year
July 12, 2018	Raymond Felton	Standard
In-Season Re-Signings
March 10, 2019	Deonte Burton	Multi-Year

==== Additions ====
Date	Player	Contract	Former team
July 6, 2018	Nerlens Noel	Standard	Dallas Mavericks
July 7, 2018	Deonte Burton	Two-Way	(South Korea) Wonju DB Promy
August 13, 2018	Tyler Davis	Two-Way	Texas A&M (NCAA)
In-Season Additions
December 28, 2018	Donte Grantham	Two-Way	Oklahoma City Blue (G League)
February 14, 2019	Scotty Hopson	10-Day	Oklahoma City Blue (G League)
February 14, 2019	Richard Solomon	10-Day	Oklahoma City Blue (G League)
February 20, 2019	Markieff Morris	Standard	Washington Wizards
March 25, 2019	Jawun Evans	Two-Way	Phoenix Suns

==== Subtractions ====
Date	Player	Reason left	New team
May 10, 2018	Nick Collison	Retired	N/A
August 20, 2018	Daniel Hamilton	Free Agent	Atlanta Hawks
August 21, 2018	PJ Dozier	Free Agent	Boston Celtics
August 31, 2018	Kyle Singler	Waived	(Spain) Obradoiro CAB
October 22, 2018	Josh Huestis	Free Agent	Austin Spurs (G League)
January 15, 2019	Corey Brewer	Free Agent	Philadelphia 76ers
In-Season Subtractions
December 27, 2018	Tyler Davis	Waived	(China) Xinjiang Flying Tigers
February 9, 2019	Alex Abrines	Waived	(Spain) FC Barcelona

== Awards, records and milestones ==
=== Awards ===
Player	Award	Date awarded	Ref.
Russell Westbrook	Western Conference Player of the Week	November 5, 2018	
Paul George	Western Conference Player of the Week	December 24, 2018	
Paul George	NBA All-Star starter (6th appearance)	January 24, 2019	
Paul George	Western Conference Player of the Week	January 28, 2019	
Russell Westbrook	NBA All-Star reserve (8th appearance)	January 31, 2019	
Paul George	Western Conference Player of the Week	February 11, 2019	
Hamidou Diallo	NBA Slam Dunk Contest champion	February 16, 2019	
Paul George	Western Conference Player of the Month (February)	March 1, 2019	
Russell Westbrook	Western Conference Player of the Week	April 8, 2019	
Paul George	NBA steals leader	April 10, 2019	
Russell Westbrook	NBA assists leader (2nd time)	April 10, 2019	
Paul George	All-Defensive First Team	May 23, 2019	
Paul George	All-NBA First Team	May 23, 2019	
Russell Westbrook	All-NBA Third Team	May 23, 2019	
