= Terrance Ferguson (basketball) =

American basketball player (born 1998)

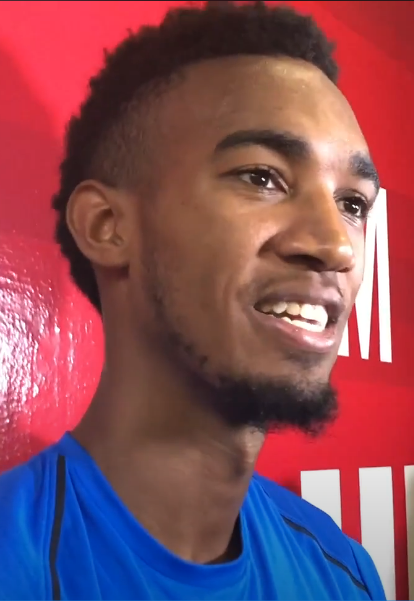
- Ferguson at the 2018 NBA Summer League

Free agent
- Position: Shooting guard / small forward

Personal information
- Born: May 17, 1998 (age 28) Tulsa, Oklahoma, U.S.
- Listed height: 6 ft 6 in (1.98 m)
- Listed weight: 190 lb (86 kg)

Career information
- High school: Prime Prep Academy (Dallas, Texas); Advanced Preparatory International (Dallas, Texas)
- NBA draft: 2017: 1st round, 21st overall pick
- Drafted by: Oklahoma City Thunder
- Playing career: 2016–present

Career history
- 2016–2017: Adelaide 36ers
- 2017–2020: Oklahoma City Thunder
- 2017–2018: →Oklahoma City Blue
- 2020–2021: Philadelphia 76ers
- 2021–2022: Lavrio
- 2022: Rio Grande Valley Vipers
- 2022–2023: GTK Gliwice
- 2023–2024: Cape Town Tigers
- 2024: Bashkimi
- 2025: Venados de Mazatlán
- 2025: Santos del Potosí
- 2026: Club Atlético Welcome

Career highlights
- NBA G League champion (2022); McDonald's All-American (2016)
- Stats at NBA.com
- Stats at Basketball Reference
Medals
Men's basketball
Representing United States
FIBA U19 World Championship
Gold medal – first place	2015 Greece	National team
FIBA U17 World Championship
Gold medal – first place	2014 Dubai	National team
FIBA Americas U16 Championship
Gold medal – first place	2013 Uruguay	National team

Terrance Eugene Ferguson Jr. (born May 17, 1998) is an American professional basketball player who last played for Bashkimi Prizren. He completed high school at Advanced Preparatory International in Dallas, Texas, where he was a top-20 player in the Class of 2016. Ferguson made separate commitments to both Alabama and Arizona before deciding to skip college and play overseas in 2016–17. He is a three-time gold medalist with Team USA, and in 2016, he participated in the McDonald's All-American Game and the Nike Hoop Summit, winning the MVP award at the latter.

Ferguson was selected with the 21st overall pick of the 2017 NBA draft by the Oklahoma City Thunder, where he spent three seasons before being traded to the Philadelphia 76ers in December 2020.

== High school career ==
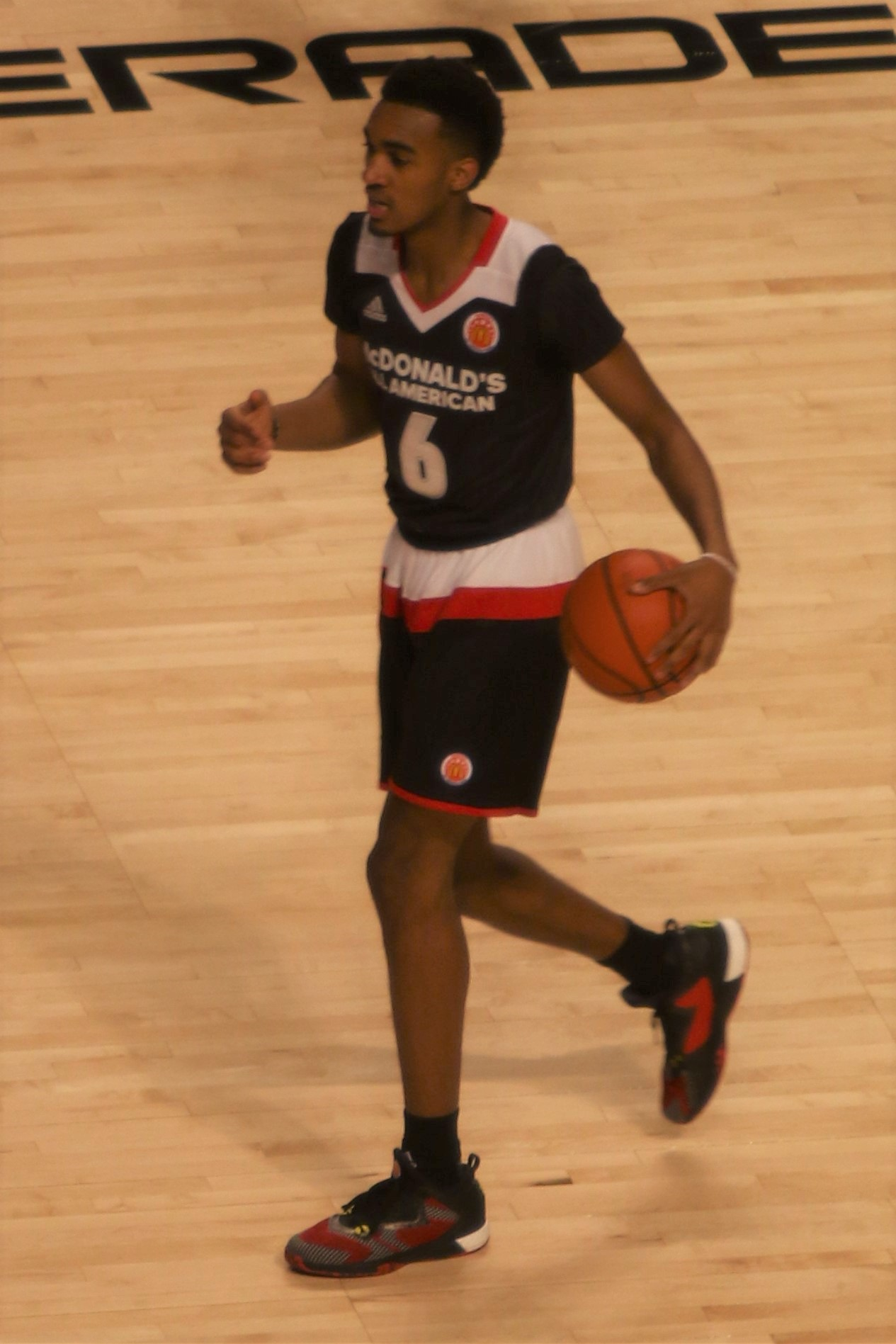
Ferguson in the 2016 McDonald's All-American Game

Born in Tulsa, Oklahoma, Ferguson moved to Dallas, Texas as a youth and enrolled at Prime Prep Academy. He joined the school's basketball team and played for coach Ray Forsett. As a freshman in 2012–13, Ferguson averaged 10 points per game and helped his team to a 38–2 record, the 2013 NACA Division I Tournament title, and the 2013 National High School Invitational semifinals. He was named to the NACA All-Tournament Team and earned NACA Tournament MVP honors.

In January 2015, halfway through his junior year at Prime Prep Academy, the school closed amid allegations of theft and the mishandling of funds. In September 2015, a new institution known as Advanced Preparatory International opened in place of Prime Prep. Coach Ray Forsett subsequently joined the ranks at Advanced Prep, while four players, including Ferguson, moved over from Prime Prep with Forsett to play for Advanced Prep in 2015–16.

Heading into his senior year of high school, Ferguson was ranked No. 11 overall in the Class of 2016's ESPN 100. He averaged 17.0 points, 3.5 rebounds and 2.0 assists per game for Advanced Prep in 2015–16, earning a trip to the McDonald's All-American Game. As a starter for the East team, he scored 10 points in a 114–107 loss to the West.

On April 9, 2016, he scored 21 points, all on three-pointers, to help the USA Junior National Select Team defeat the World Select Team 101–67 at the Moda Center. It was the most lopsided victory in Nike Hoop Summit history. Ferguson's seven threes broke the Nike Hoop Summit record for threes made; the previous record of six was shared by Xavier Henry (2009) and Casey Jacobsen (1999). He subsequently earned MVP honors. Prior to the Nike Hoop Summit, Ferguson boasted a 19–0 record with Team USA; he made it 20–0 with USA's Summit win. On April 30, he won the Ballislife All-American Game dunk contest after performing a free throw line dunk.

=== Recruitment ===
In January 2015, coach Rick Pitino of the University of Louisville began heavily recruiting Ferguson. Other teams showing interest in him at the time were Kansas, Baylor, Oklahoma State, Oklahoma, Arizona, North Carolina, Wichita State, Iowa State, UCLA, Wake Forest, Arkansas and Maryland.

In August 2015, he committed to play for Alabama in 2016–17. However, he never signed a letter of intent, and when the early signing period passed in November without Ferguson signing, other schools began contacting him. This led to him decommitting from Alabama on March 1, 2016. On April 13, he committed to Arizona, the first day of the spring signing period, but did not sign a letter of intent despite indications he would, eventually signing non-binding financial aid papers.

His commitment to Arizona lasted until early June, when rumors emerged that Ferguson had decided to skip college for a chance to play overseas in 2016–17. On June 6, Australia was deemed the most likely destination, with the Adelaide 36ers rumored to be close to formalizing a deal with Ferguson. By the end of the month, he had informed Wildcats coach Sean Miller of his decision to pursue professional opportunities instead of attending Arizona.

== Professional career ==
=== Adelaide 36ers (2016–2017) ===
On July 1, 2016, Ferguson signed with the Adelaide 36ers for the 2016–17 NBL season. On October 7, 2016, he made his debut for the 36ers in their season opener against the Illawarra Hawks. In 17½ minutes off the bench, he scored 10 points on 4-of-9 shooting in a 122–88 loss. On October 14, 2016, he scored 13 points in a 98–87 loss to Melbourne United. On October 24, 2016, he was handed a two-game suspension for striking following the 36ers' Round 3 game against the Cairns Taipans on October 21. The incident occurred during the first quarter and involved Taipans' player Mark Worthington. By accepting the charge via an early guilty plea, only a one-game suspension was imposed. On January 19, 2017, he tied his season high with 13 points in a 101–68 win over the Brisbane Bullets. The 36ers finished the regular season in first place with a 17–11 record, but were knocked out in the semi-finals by the fourth-seeded Illawarra Hawks, losing the best-of-three series 2–1. Ferguson appeared in 30 of the team's 31 games in 2016–17, averaging 4.6 points and 1.2 rebounds in 15.2 minutes per game. Following the conclusion of the season, he returned to the U.S. to begin preparations for the 2017 NBA draft.

=== Oklahoma City Thunder (2017–2020) ===
On June 22, 2017, Ferguson was selected by his hometown team, the Oklahoma City Thunder, with the 21st overall pick in the 2017 NBA draft. On July 29, 2017, he signed a 4-year, $10.3 million rookie-scale contract with the Thunder. On November 14, 2017, he was assigned to the Oklahoma City Blue of the NBA G League. He was recalled the next day. On January 3, 2018, in his first career start, Ferguson scored a career-high 24 points in a 133–96 win over the Los Angeles Lakers.

On October 29, 2018, the Thunder exercised Ferguson's $2.5 million team option for the 2019–20 season.

On October 18, 2019, the Thunder exercised Ferguson's $3.9 million team option for the 2020–21 season.

=== Philadelphia 76ers (2020–2021) ===
On December 8, 2020, Ferguson, along with Danny Green and Vincent Poirier, were traded to the Philadelphia 76ers in exchange for Al Horford, the draft rights to Théo Maledon and Vasilije Micić, and a 2025 protected first-round pick.

On March 25, 2021, Ferguson was traded to the New York Knicks in a three-way trade involving the Oklahoma City Thunder and was waived four days later.

=== Lavrio (2021–2022) ===
On December 14, 2021, Ferguson signed with his first European club, Lavrio of the Greek Basket League and the Basketball Champions League, after having been in preliminary talks with other Greek teams, such as AEK Athens and Ionikos Nikaias, since the beginning of the 2021–22 season. Less than a month later, on January 10, 2022, he parted ways with the Greek club in order to return to the U.S., signing an NBA G League contract. In three Greek Basket League games, he averaged 2 points and 1 rebound per contest, shooting with 25% from the field and 20% from beyond the three-point arc.

=== Rio Grande Valley Vipers (2022) ===
On January 11, 2022, Ferguson was acquired via waivers by the Rio Grande Valley Vipers. He was released by the team on January 24, but was re-acquired on February 3.

=== GTK Gliwice (2022–2023) ===
On August 27, 2022, he has signed with GTK Gliwice of the Polish Basketball League (PLK).

=== Cape Town Tigers (2023–2024) ===
In September 2023, the South African club Cape Town Tigers announced they had signed Ferguson on their Instagram account. He made his Tigers debut on November 21, 2023, with 11 points in a 76–61 win over Dynamo in the Road to BAL.

=== Bashkimi (2024) ===
In February 2024, the Kosovan club Bashkimi of the Kosovo Superleague announced they had signed Ferguson. He parted ways with Bashkimi after just one league game in March 2024.

== National team career ==
Ferguson was a member of the USA Basketball Men's U16 National Team that posted a 5–0 record en route to winning gold at the 2013 FIBA Americas Under-16 Championship in Maldonado, Uruguay. He played in all five games and averaged 5.8 points, 3.8 rebounds and 2.0 assists per game. The following year, he was a member of the USA U17 World Championship Team that posted a 7–0 record and captured the 2014 FIBA Under-17 World Championship gold medal in Dubai. Ferguson played in all seven games (with four starts) and averaged 9.0 points, 1.3 rebounds and 1.6 assists per game.

In July 2015, Ferguson won his third gold medal in as many years after helping Team USA go 7–0 at the 2015 FIBA Under-19 World Championship in Heraklion, Greece. He played in all seven games and averaged 6.1 points, 1.6 rebounds and 1.0 assists per game.

== Personal life ==
Ferguson is the son of Rachelle Holdman. He has one brother, Brandon, and one sister, Brittnay.

== Career statistics ==
Legend
GP	Games played	GS	Games started	MPG	Minutes per game
FG%	Field goal percentage	3P%	3-point field goal percentage	FT%	Free throw percentage
RPG	Rebounds per game	APG	Assists per game	SPG	Steals per game
BPG	Blocks per game	PPG	Points per game	**Bold**	Career high

=== NBA ===
==== Regular season ====
Year	Team	GP	GS	MPG	FG%	3P%	FT%	RPG	APG	SPG	BPG	PPG
2017–18	Oklahoma City	61	12	12.5	.414	.333	**.900**	.8	.3	.4	.2	3.1
2018–19	Oklahoma City	**74**	**74**	**26.1**	**.429**	**.366**	.725	**1.9**	**1.0**	**.5**	.2	**6.9**
2019–20	Oklahoma City	56	38	22.4	.355	.292	.750	1.3	.9	**.5**	**.3**	3.9
2020–21	Philadelphia	13	0	3.8	.143	.000	–	.1	.2	.1	.0	.2
Career		204	124	19.6	.404	.334	.753	1.3	.7	.5	.2	4.5

==== Playoffs ====
Year	Team	GP	GS	MPG	FG%	3P%	FT%	RPG	APG	SPG	BPG	PPG
2018	Oklahoma City	3	0	2.0	**1.000**	**1.000**	—	.3	.3	.0	.0	1.0
2019	Oklahoma City	**5**	**5**	**25.6**	.360	.389	—	**2.4**	**1.2**	**0.4**	.0	**5.0**
2020	Oklahoma City	4	1	10.5	.182	.200	—	1.0	.3	.3	.0	1.5
Career		12	6	14.7	.324	.345	—	1.4	.7	.3	.0	2.8

=== NBL ===
Year	Team	GP	GS	MPG	FG%	3P%	FT%	RPG	APG	SPG	BPG	PPG
2016–17	Adelaide	30	17	15.2	.381	.313	.600	1.1	.6	.2	.3	4.6
Career		30	17	15.2	.381	.313	.600	1.1	.6	.2	.3	4.6
