= 2009 FIBA Europe Under-18 Championship =

International basketball competition

2009 FIBA U18 European Championship
26th FIBA Under-18 European Basketball Championship

Tournament details
- Host country: France
- Dates: 23 July-2 August 2009
- Teams: 16 (from 1 federation)
- Venues: 3 (in 2 host cities)

Final positions
- Champions: Serbia (8th title)

Tournament statistics
- MVP: (Turkey) Enes Kanter
- Top scorer: (Croatia) Toni Prostran (20.9)
- Top rebounds: (Turkey) Enes Kanter (16.4)
- Top assists: (Croatia) Toni Prostran (7.9)
- PPG (Team): Lithuania (81.7)
- RPG (Team): Lithuania (46.9)
- APG (Team): Spain (18.0)

Official website
- Official website (archive)

The 2009 FIBA Europe Under-18 Championship was the 26th edition of the FIBA Europe Under-18 Championship. The competition was held in Metz and nearby Hagondange, France, from July 23 to August 2 and featured 16 teams. Serbia won the title after beating France in the final.

== Participating teams ==
Group A	Group B	Group C	Group D
Czech Republic; France; Slovenia; Serbia	Croatia; Germany; Spain; Ukraine	Bulgaria; Greece; Latvia; Turkey	Israel; Italy; Lithuania; Russia

== Venues ==
Metz Les Arènes (cap. : 4500)

Metz Palais des sports Saint Symphorien (cap. : 1800)

Hagondange Salle Paul Lamm (cap. :1500)

== Preliminary round ==
In this round, the sixteen teams were allocated in four groups of four teams each. The top three qualified for the qualifying round. The last team of each group played for the 13th–16th place in the classification games.

Team advances to qualifying round
Team will compete in 13–16th playoffs

=== Group A ===
Team	Pld	W	L	PF	PA	PD	Pts	Tiebreaker
Serbia	3	2	1	207	174	+33	5	1–1, +14
France	3	2	1	227	213	+24	5	1–1, +3
Slovenia	3	2	1	207	221	−14	5	1–1; −17
Czech Republic	3	0	3	194	227	−33	3	

=== Group B ===
Team	Pld	W	L	PF	PA	PD	Pts	Tiebreaker
Croatia	3	3	0	228	198	+30	6	
Spain	3	2	1	258	212	+46	5	
Germany	3	1	2	207	233	−26	4	
Ukraine	3	0	3	220	270	−50	3	

=== Group C ===
Team	Pld	W	L	PF	PA	PD	Pts	Tiebreaker
Turkey	3	3	0	237	182	+55	6	
Latvia	3	1	2	181	203	−22	4	1–1, +13
Bulgaria	3	1	2	170	192	−22	4	1–1, −6
Greece	3	1	2	200	211	−11	4	1–1, −7

=== Group D ===
Team	Pld	W	L	PF	PA	PD	Pts	Tiebreaker
Lithuania	3	3	0	254	207	+47	6	
Italy	3	1	2	205	198	+7	4	1–1, +8
Russia	3	1	2	186	193	−7	4	1–1, −0
Israel	3	1	2	173	220	−47	4	1–1, −8

== Qualifying round ==
The twelve teams remaining were allocated in two groups of six teams each. The four top teams advanced to the quarterfinals. The last two teams of each group played for the 9th–12th place.

Team advances to quarterfinals
Team will compete in 9th–12th playoffs

=== Group E ===
Team	Pld	W	L	PF	PA	PD	Pts	Tiebreaker
Spain	5	4	1	375	334	+41	9	
France	5	3	2	356	341	+15	8	2–0
Serbia	5	3	2	358	321	+37	8	1–1
Croatia	5	3	2	376	357	+19	8	0–2
Germany	5	1	4	310	387	−77	6	1–0
Slovenia	5	1	4	355	390	−35	6	0–1

=== Group F ===
Team	Pld	W	L	PF	PA	PD	Pts	Tiebreaker
Lithuania	5	5	0	432	335	+97	10	
Italy	5	3	2	351	316	+35	8	1–1, +8
Russia	5	3	2	361	317	+44	8	1–1, −1
Turkey	5	3	2	373	338	+35	8	1–1, −7
Latvia	5	1	4	289	359	−70	6	1–0
Bulgaria	5	0	5	258	399	−141	5	0–1

== Championship ==
Quarter-finals
July 31 – Metz
Turkey	76
Spain	62
July 31 – Metz
Serbia	82
Italy	74
July 31 – Metz
Lithuania	74
Croatia	55
July 31 – Metz
France	74
Russia	61

Semi-finals
August 1 – Metz
Serbia	66
Turkey	61
August 1 – Metz
France	68
Lithuania	63

Final
August 2 – Metz
Serbia	78
France	72
Third place
August 2 – Metz
Turkey	95
Lithuania	74

== Final standings ==
Rank	Team
1st place, gold medalist(s)	Serbia
2nd place, silver medalist(s)	France
3rd place, bronze medalist(s)	Turkey
4th	Lithuania
5th	Spain
6th	Russia
7th	Italy
8th	Croatia
9th	Latvia
10th	Bulgaria
11th	Germany
12th	Slovenia
13th	Greece
14th	Ukraine
15th	Israel
16th	Czech Republic

2009 FIBA Europe U-18 Championship

Serbia
Third title

Team roster

Nemanja Jaramaz, Aleksandar Ponjavić, Petar Torlak, Miloš Tripković, Nikola Vukasović, Milić Blagojević, Danilo Anđušić, Lazar Radosavljević, Nemanja Bešović, Nikola Rondović, Branislav Đekić, and Dejan Musli. Head coach: Vlada Jovanović.

Team is relegated to Division B.

=== All Tournament Team ===
Player	Position	Team
Enes Kanter	F/C	Turkey
Jonas Valančiūnas	F/C	Lithuania
Dejan Musli	C	Serbia
Evan Fournier	G	France
Toni Prostran	PG	Croatia

== See also ==
- European Under-18 All-Star Game 2009
