= Enes Kanter Freedom =

American basketball player and activist (born 1992)

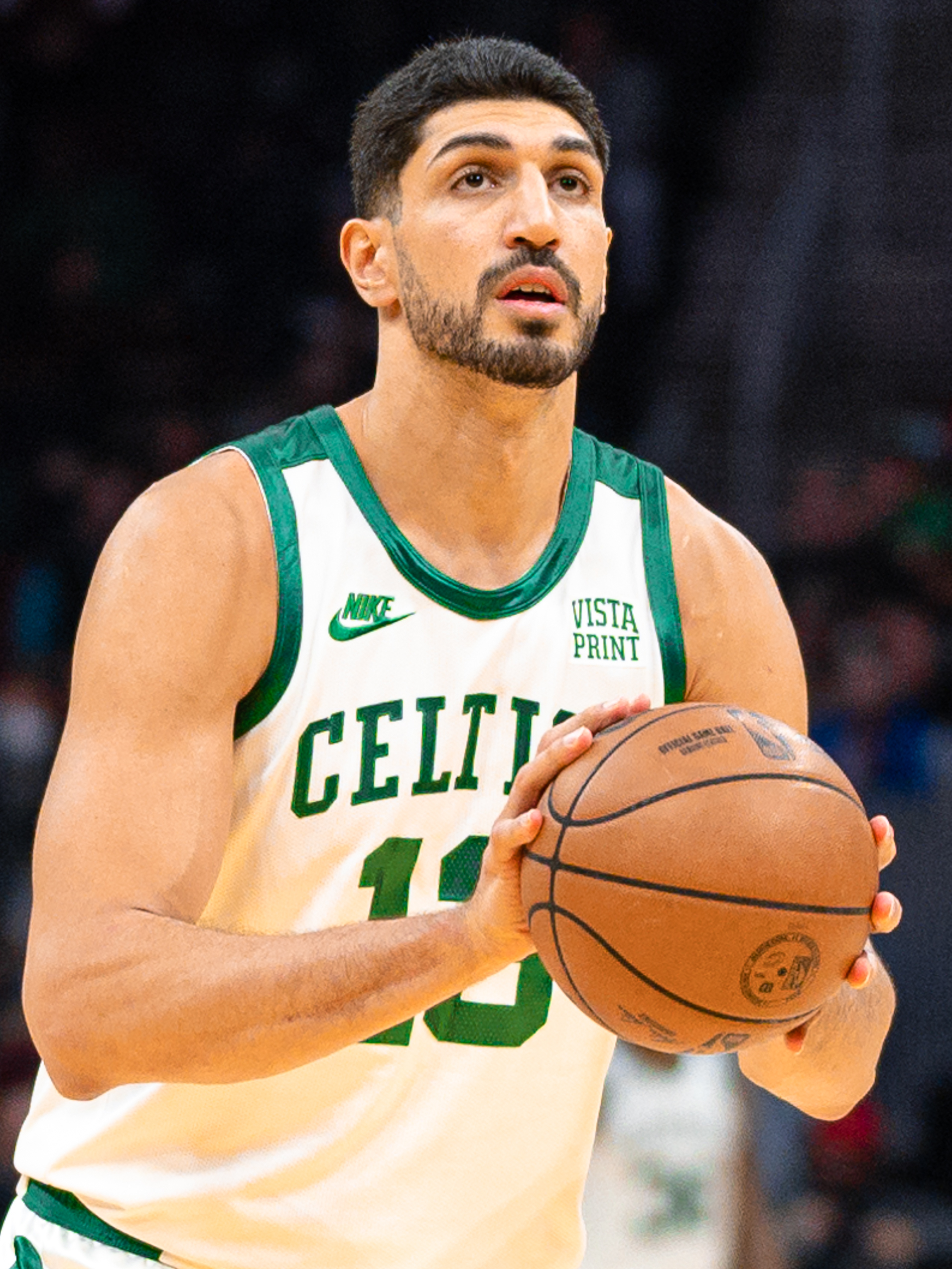
- Kanter with the Boston Celtics in 2021

Personal information
- Born: May 20, 1992 (age 34) Zurich, Switzerland
- Listed height: 6 ft 10 in (2.08 m)
- Listed weight: 250 lb (113 kg)

Career information
- High school: Stoneridge Preparatory School (Simi Valley, California)
- NBA draft: 2011: 1st round, 3rd overall pick
- Drafted by: Utah Jazz
- Playing career: 2008–2009; 2011–2022
- Position: Center
- Number: 0, 34, 11, 00, 13

Career history
- 2008–2009: Fenerbahçe
- 2011–2015: Utah Jazz
- 2015–2017: Oklahoma City Thunder
- 2017–2019: New York Knicks
- 2019: Portland Trail Blazers
- 2019–2020: Boston Celtics
- 2020–2021: Portland Trail Blazers
- 2021–2022: Boston Celtics

Career highlights
- Nike Hoop Summit (2010); FIBA Europe U18 Championship MVP (2009); Albert Schweitzer Tournament Most Talented Player (2008)

Career NBA statistics
- Points: 8,349 (11.2 ppg)
- Rebounds: 5,822 (7.8 rpg)
- Assists: 638 (0.9 apg)
- Stats at NBA.com
- Stats at Basketball Reference
Medals
Men's basketball
Representing Turkey
FIBA Europe U18 Championship
Bronze medal – third place	2009 France	Team

Enes Kanter Freedom (Turkish pronunciation: [eˈnes kanˈtæɾ fɾiˈdom]; born Enes Kanter; May 20, 1992) is a Turkish and American former professional basketball player who played 11 seasons in the National Basketball Association (NBA). Born in Switzerland to parents from Turkey, he was raised in Turkey and moved to the United States as a teenager. Freedom was selected as the third overall pick of the 2011 NBA draft by the Utah Jazz, and primarily played the center position.

== Early life and youth career ==
Enes Kanter Freedom was born on May 20, 1992, in Zürich, Switzerland as Enes Kanter. Kanter's parents immigrated to Switzerland from Turkey, and he is of Kurdish descent on his father’s side. His father, Mehmet Kanter, received his M.D. from the University of Zurich. The family then returned to Van, Turkey, where Kanter grew up. Mehmet Kanter became a professor of histology and genetics at Trakya University. Kanter's mother, Gülsüm Kanter, is a nurse. Kanter has three younger siblings: two brothers (including basketball player Kerem Kanter) and one sister.

Starting in second grade, Kanter attended Hizmet-affiliated schools, part of the Gülen movement in Turkey, for which he later became an outspoken supporter. He lived in Ankara and then moved to Istanbul to play professional basketball as a teen.

At the age of 17, Kanter moved to the United States to play basketball. He attended Findlay Prep in Henderson, Nevada, and then Mountain State Academy in Beckley, West Virginia; neither school allowed him to play high school basketball because he had already played basketball professionally. Kanter then attended Stoneridge Preparatory School in Simi Valley, California, where he was able to play basketball for a season.

== Professional career ==
=== Fenerbahçe (2008–2009) ===
Before moving to the United States, Kanter played under Serdar Apaydın's management for the Fenerbahçe youth squad between 2006 and 2008 and then, during the 2008–09 season, Kanter was a seldom-used reserve for the Fenerbahçe senior team. He played in at least nine games with the team: four in the EuroLeague and five in the Turkish Super League. Fenerbahçe and the Greek League basketball team Olympiacos both offered Kanter professional contracts, but he declined because he wanted to play high school and college basketball in the United States.

In 2009, Kanter moved to the United States, where he enrolled at Stoneridge Preparatory School in Simi Valley, California, and played for the basketball team in 2009–10. At the 2010 Nike Hoop Summit, Kanter played for the international team, recording 34 points and 13 rebounds. His point total was a record for the event, breaking Dirk Nowitzki's record set in the 1998 game. Both Rivals.com and Scout.com (now known as 247Sports.com) rated Kanter as a five-star prospect, the highest possible rating.

In November 2009 Kanter verbally committed to play for the Washington Huskies. Kanter chose Washington over UCLA, USC, Indiana and UNLV. However, he re-opened his recruitment in February 2010, and on April 14, Kanter signed a National Letter of Intent to play college basketball for Kentucky.

However, despite signing with the Kentucky Wildcats, the NCAA declared him permanently ineligible as a collegiate athlete because he received approximately $33,000 from Fenerbahçe in excess benefits. The NCAA ruled that this amount was above and beyond what was considered acceptable. On January 7, 2011, the NCAA denied Kentucky's appeal, upholding that Kanter was permanently ineligible.

=== Utah Jazz (2011–2015) ===
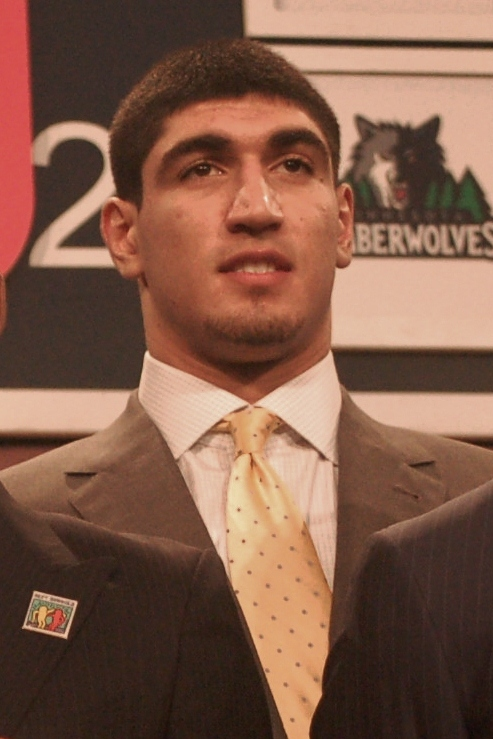
Kanter at the 2011 NBA draft

Kanter, a center, was drafted third overall by the Utah Jazz in the 2011 NBA draft. Upon being drafted, he said "I'm so happy, I'm so excited. I know the Utah Jazz fans are crazy and I love them. I will bring the team toughness and post moves, rebounding, everything. I will try to do everything to make the playoffs." On December 9, 2011, he signed his rookie scale contract with the Jazz following the conclusion of the NBA lockout. In 2011–12, he became the 10th Jazz rookie in franchise history to appear in every regular-season game. He also recorded the most rebounds for a Jazz rookie in debut with 11 against the Los Angeles Lakers on December 27. In the season, he averaged 4.6 points and 4.2 rebounds in 66 games.

In 2012–13, Kanter improved his averages in every major statistical category, led the team in scoring three times and rebounding four times, and scored in double-figures 22 times. In 70 games (two starts), he averaged 7.2 points and 4.3 rebounds per game. On March 1, 2013, Kanter had the first 20–20 game of his career with career-highs of 23 points and 22 rebounds to lead the Jazz to a 98–68 victory over the Charlotte Bobcats. He later missed the final 10 games of the season due to a dislocated left shoulder.

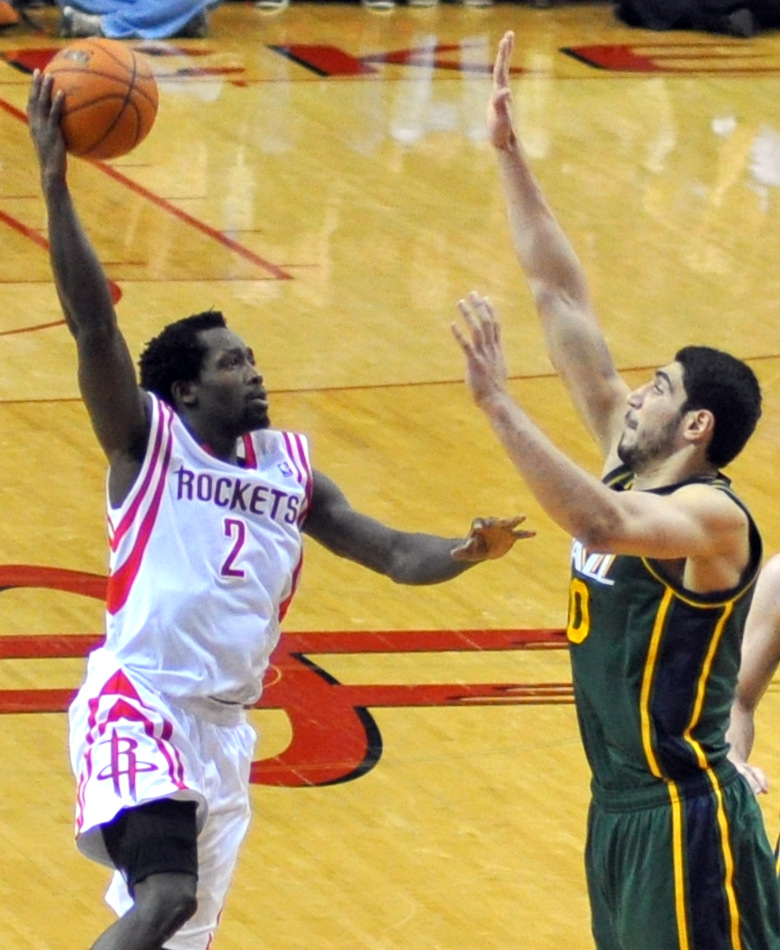
Kanter contests Patrick Beverley's shot during a game in March 2014

In 2013–14, Kanter appeared in 80 games (37 starts), averaging 12.3 points and 7.5 rebounds per game. On March 3, 2014, he scored a then career-high 27 points in a 114–88 loss to the Milwaukee Bucks.

On December 16, 2014, Kanter scored a then career-high 29 points in a 119–111 loss to the New Orleans Pelicans.

=== Oklahoma City Thunder (2015–2017) ===
On February 19, 2015, Kanter was traded to the Oklahoma City Thunder in a three-team deal that involved the Detroit Pistons. Two days later, he made his debut for the Thunder, recording a double-double with 10 points and 13 rebounds in a 110–103 win over the Charlotte Hornets. On April 1, 2015, he scored a then career-high 30 points in a 135–131 loss to the Dallas Mavericks.

After the 2014–15 season, Kanter became a restricted free agent. On July 9, 2015, he received a four-year, $70 million offer sheet from the Portland Trail Blazers. However, three days later, the Thunder exercised their right of first refusal and matched the offer sheet extended to Kanter by the Trail Blazers. On March 14, 2016, he scored a then season-high 26 points in a 128–94 win over the Portland Trail Blazers. On April 6, he recorded a career-high 33 points and 20 rebounds in a 120–115 loss to the Portland Trail Blazers, becoming the first player in Thunder history to score at least 30 points and grab 20 rebounds in a game. In Game 3 of the Thunder's first-round playoff series against the Dallas Mavericks, Kanter recorded a playoff career-high 21 points and a game-high eight rebounds in a 131–102 win, claiming a 2–1 series lead. In Game 4 of the series, Kanter helped the Thunder go up 3–1 with 28 points on 12-of-13 shooting, setting a playoff career high for the second straight game. During his time in Oklahoma City, Enes was a beloved member of the "Stache Bros" which was the nickname for former Oklahoma City Thunder centers Steven Adams and Enes Kanter, who developed a close friendship and matching mustaches while teammates from 2015–2017. Known for their comedic on-court partnership, similar personalities, and shared love for charity, they became a beloved duo during their time with the team.

On November 28, 2016, Kanter recorded a season-high 27 points and 10 rebounds in a 112–103 win over the New York Knicks. On January 26, 2017, he sustained a fractured forearm after punching a chair on the Thunder's bench during their game against the Dallas Mavericks. He was subsequently ruled out for six to eight weeks. He returned to action on February 24, 2017, against the Los Angeles Lakers after missing nine games. He finished with four points on 2-for-12 shooting.

=== New York Knicks (2017–2019) ===
On September 25, 2017, Kanter was traded, along with Doug McDermott and a 2018 second-round pick, to the New York Knicks in exchange for Carmelo Anthony. In his debut for the Knicks in their season opener on October 19, 2017, Kanter had 10 points and seven rebounds in a 105–84 loss to his former team, the Oklahoma City Thunder. Five days later, he recorded 16 points and 19 rebounds in a 110–89 loss to the Boston Celtics. On November 29, 2017, after missing three games with back spasms, Kanter had 22 points and 14 rebounds in a 115–86 win over the Miami Heat. On December 25, 2017, he had a season-high 31 points and tied a career best with 22 rebounds in a 105–98 loss to the Philadelphia 76ers. He joined Wilt Chamberlain, Bill Russell, and Bob Lanier as the only players with a 30–20 game on Christmas. On January 30, 2018, he recorded 20 points, 20 rebounds and five assists in a 111–95 win over the Brooklyn Nets. On February 6, 2018, in a 103–89 loss to the Milwaukee Bucks, Kanter recorded 19 points and 16 rebounds for his sixth consecutive double-double, marking the longest streak by any Knick since David Lee had seven straight from February 9–26, 2010. On March 6, 2018, he had 18 points and 11 rebounds in a 111–87 loss to the Portland Trail Blazers. It was Kanter's 32nd double-double of the season, a career high.

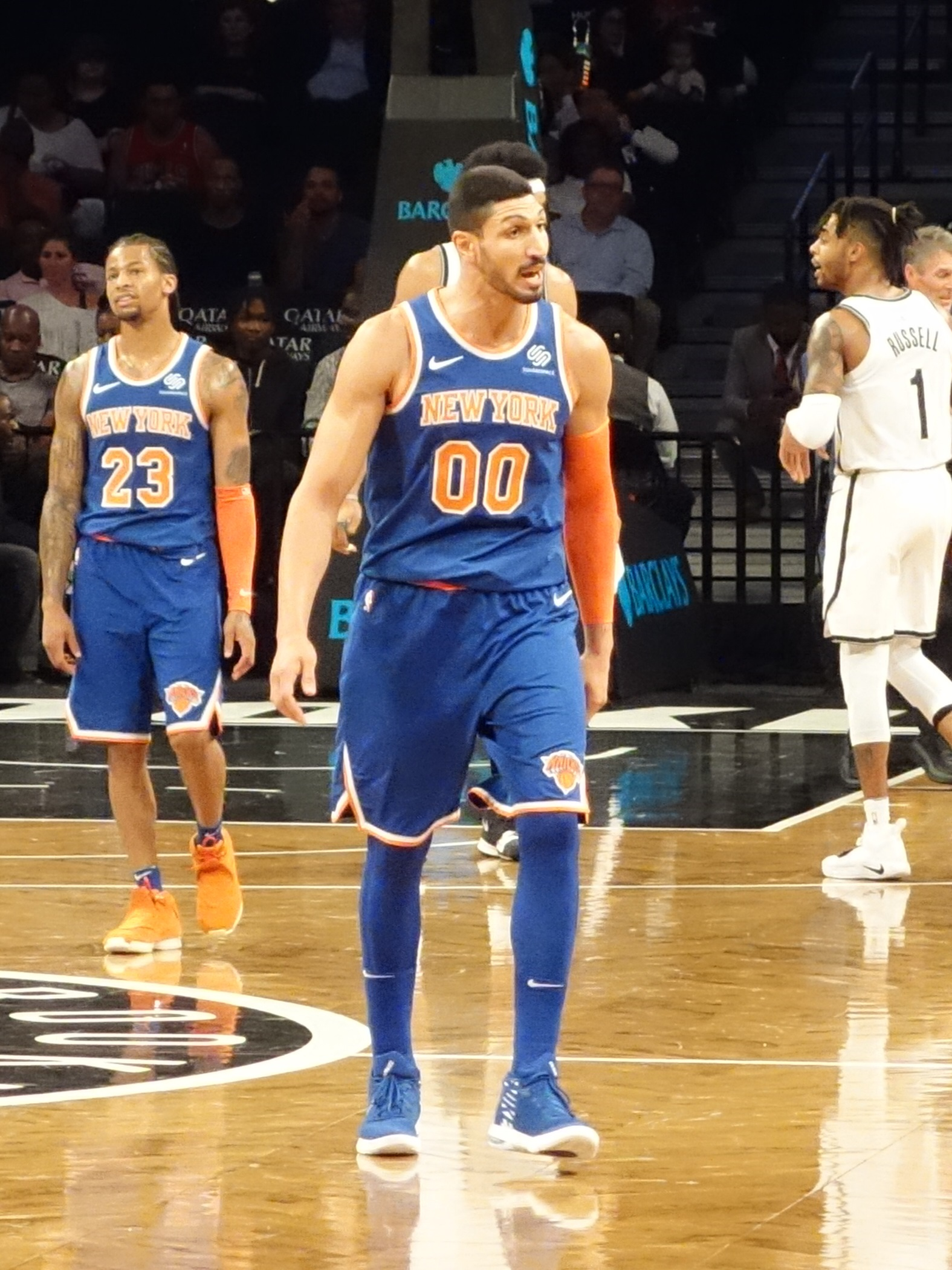
Kanter with the New York Knicks in 2018

On October 19, 2018, Kanter scored 29 points in a 107–105 loss to the Nets. A day later, he recorded 17 points and 15 rebounds in a 103–101 loss to the Celtics, becoming the first Knick since Zach Randolph (2007–08) to start the season with three straight double-doubles. On November 5 he recorded 23 points and 24 rebounds in a 116–115 double-overtime loss to the Chicago Bulls. On November 11, he notched his fifth straight double-double with 16 points and 15 rebounds in a 115–89 loss to the Orlando Magic. On November 25, recorded 21 points and a career-high 26 rebounds in a 103–98 win over the Memphis Grizzlies. In late December, Kanter was demoted to a reduced role off the bench. Kanter was waived by the Knicks on February 7, 2019. During his last game at Madison Square Garden, Kanter ran out and kissed the court goodbye.

=== Portland Trail Blazers (2019) ===
On February 13, 2019, Kanter signed with the Portland Trail Blazers. He made his debut for the Trail Blazers on February 21, recording 18 points and nine rebounds off the bench in a 113–99 win over the Brooklyn Nets. In game one of the Trail Blazers' first-round playoff series against the Oklahoma City Thunder, Kanter had 20 points and a career playoff-high 18 rebounds in a 104–99 win, becoming just the third player in team history with at least 20 points and 18 rebounds in playoff game: Bill Walton did it three times and LaMarcus Aldridge once.

=== Boston Celtics (2019–2020) ===
When free agency opened on July 1, 2019, Kanter and the Boston Celtics agreed to a two-year, $10 million contract. He was officially signed on July 17. With the Celtics, Kanter averaged 8.1 points, 7.4 rebounds, and 1 assist. His season highs were 22 points, 6 blocks, and 19 rebounds. In the playoffs, he scored a total of 50 points in 11 games, averaging 4.5 points per game.

=== Return to Portland (2020–2021) ===
On November 20, 2020, Kanter was traded back to the Portland Trail Blazers in a three-team trade that also included the Memphis Grizzlies. On April 10, 2021, in a 118–103 win over the Detroit Pistons, Kanter set a career high and franchise record 30 rebounds, breaking Sidney Wicks record of 27 which he set in 1975. He also scored 24 points in the game, in which he became just the third player in the past 20 years to deliver a 20-point, 30-rebound performance.

=== Return to Boston (2021–2022) ===
On August 13, 2021, Kanter signed a one-year, worth $2.7 million veteran's minimum contract with the Boston Celtics. Following his American citizen status approval and legal name change later that year on November 29, he would change his jersey name from Kanter to Freedom going forward with the season.

On February 10, 2022, Freedom was traded, along with Dennis Schröder and Bruno Fernando, to the Houston Rockets in exchange for Daniel Theis. On February 14, the Rockets waived Freedom. Freedom believed he was waived because of his views about the Chinese government. NBA Commissioner Adam Silver denied this claim, saying "I made it absolutely clear to [Freedom] that it was completely within his right to speak out on issues that he was passionate about."

== National team career ==
Kanter made his debut for the Turkish national basketball team at the 2008 FIBA Europe Under-16 Championship in Italy. He dominated throughout the tournament, averaging 22.9 points, 16.5 rebounds and 1.5 blocks in 34.6 minutes per game. However, Jonas Valančiūnas was chosen as the MVP after he averaged 14.3 points, 11.1 rebounds and 2.3 blocks in 23.5 minutes. Kanter went on to earn MVP honors at the 2009 FIBA Europe Under-18 Championship after averaging 18.6 points and 16.4 rebounds while leading Turkey's junior national team to the bronze medal. He declined to play for the senior national team at the 2010 FIBA World Championship which was being held in Turkey as the team went on to win the silver medal. His father claimed he did this in order not to miss the first month of classes at Kentucky.

Kanter played with the Turkish senior team for the first time at the 2011 EuroBasket where he was the youngest player to make the team. He appeared in eight games and averaged 9.6 points and 3.9 rebounds per game. Kanter was left off the team's roster for EuroBasket 2015. Kanter alleged that the omission was due to his relationship with Fethullah Gülen and his support of the Gülen movement while coach Ergin Ataman said that Kanter was excluded because "he did not apologize to teammates for past incidents". Kanter also believes that if he were to go to Turkey to play he would end up jailed or surrepetitously killed by the Turkish government.

== Career statistics ==
Legend
GP	Games played	GS	Games started	MPG	Minutes per game
FG%	Field-goal percentage	3P%	3-point field-goal percentage	FT%	Free-throw percentage
RPG	Rebounds per game	APG	Assists per game	SPG	Steals per game
BPG	Blocks per game	PPG	Points per game	PIR	Performance index rating
**Bold**	Career high	*	Led the league

=== NBA ===
==== Regular season ====
Year	Team	GP	GS	MPG	FG%	3P%	FT%	RPG	APG	SPG	BPG	PPG
2011–12	Utah	66*	0	13.2	.496	.000	.667	4.2	.1	.3	.3	4.6
2012–13	Utah	70	2	15.4	.544	**1.000**	.795	4.3	.4	.4	.5	7.2
2013–14	Utah	80	37	26.7	.491	.000	.730	7.5	.9	.4	.5	12.3
2014–15	Utah	49	48	27.1	.491	.317	.788	7.8	.5	.5	.3	13.8
2014–15	Oklahoma City	26	26	**31.1**	.566	.750	.776	**11.0**	1.1	.5	.5	**18.7**
2015–16	Oklahoma City	**82***	1	21.0	.576	.476	.797	8.1	.4	.3	.4	12.7
2016–17	Oklahoma City	72	0	21.3	.545	.132	.786	6.7	.9	.4	.5	14.3
2017–18	New York	71	**71**	25.8	.592	.000	.848	**11.0**	1.5	.5	.5	14.1
2018–19	New York	44	23	25.6	.536	.318	.814	10.5	**1.9**	.4	.4	14.0
2018–19	Portland	23	8	22.3	.577	.250	.735	8.6	1.4	**.6**	.4	13.1
2019–20	Boston	58	7	16.9	.572	.143	.707	7.4	1.0	.4	**.7**	8.1
2020–21	Portland	72*	35	24.4	**.604**	.250	.774	**11.0**	1.2	.5	**.7**	11.2
2021–22	Boston	35	1	11.7	.526	.400	**.857**	4.6	.2	.1	.4	3.7
Career		748	259	21.5	.548	.289	.777	7.8	.9	.4	.5	11.2

==== Playoffs ====
Year	Team	GP	GS	MPG	FG%	3P%	FT%	RPG	APG	SPG	BPG	PPG
2012	Utah	4	0	10.8	.438	—	.000	4.0	.3	.0	**1.0**	3.5
2016	Oklahoma City	**18**	0	18.0	**.551**	.143	.844	6.2	.3	.3	.6	9.4
2017	Oklahoma City	5	0	9.1	.385	—	**1.000**	1.8	.2	.0	.8	4.8
2019	Portland	16	**14**	**28.8**	.514	.250	.756	**9.7**	**1.2**	**.7**	.6	**11.4**
2020	Boston	11	0	9.3	.524	**1.000**	.500	3.9	.6	.0	.0	4.5
2021	Portland	5	0	11.2	.500	—	**1.000**	2.6	.0	.0	.4	2.0
Career		59	14	17.5	.514	.211	.777	5.9	.6	.3	.5	7.6

=== EuroLeague ===
Year	Team	GP	GS	MPG	FG%	3P%	FT%	RPG	APG	SPG	BPG	PPG	PIR
2008–09	Fenerbahçe	4	0	7.8	.429	.000	.667	1.5	.0	.3	.0	2.0	1.8

== Professional wrestling involvement ==
Kanter is a professional wrestling fan and has previously expressed interest in pursuing a professional wrestling career. Kanter has had online feuds with professional wrestlers including All Elite Wrestling's MJF.

On September 9, 2019, Kanter made a special appearance at a WWE Monday Night Raw event at Madison Square Garden, where prior to Raw going on the air he defeated WWE 24/7 Champion R-Truth to win the title, though he would lose it back to R-Truth moments later (all of which was shown later during the Raw broadcast). Kanter established himself as a heel during the segment, when he revealed his Celtics jersey to the New York City crowd.

=== Championships and accomplishments ===
- WWE
  - WWE 24/7 Championship (1 time)

== Awards and achievements ==
=== Human rights awards ===
- Most Valuable Patriot Of The Year
- Warrior for Truth Award
- Freedom Award

=== Basketball awards ===
- Maurice Lucas The Enforcer Award
- 2009 FIBA Europe Under-18 Championship MVP
- 2008 Albert Schweitzer Tournament Most Talented Player

=== Basketball achievements ===
- Portland Trail Blazers franchise record of 30 rebounds in a single game (against Detroit on April 10, 2021).

== Politics and activism ==
"I hope people around the world will open their eyes to the human rights abuses. Things have gotten very bad over the last year. This is not my opinion. We don't know everything that is happening inside Turkey, but we do know some facts. Newspapers and media have been restricted. Academics have been fired. Peaceful protesting is not allowed. Many people have been imprisoned without any real charges. There are reports of torture and rape and worse."
—Enes Kanter, The Players' Tribune, May 23, 2017

=== Turkey ===
Kanter received primary and secondary education at Hizmet schools in Turkey and reconnected with the movement's volunteers when Kanter arrived in the United States, even forming a personal relationship with the movement's founder, Fethullah Gülen. With regard to Gülen, Kanter has said, "His views on my religion, as well as ways to solve today's problems, were attractive to me. Gülen is promoting an Islam that highlights justice, respect and love for those who aren't like us. He believes that being a Muslim comes with some kind of duty, and that is to help others. These are principles that I feel strongly about."

Kanter said he became publicly critical of president Recep Tayyip Erdoğan in 2013 due to the corruption scandal in Turkey. After the failed 2016 coup d'état attempt, Kanter criticised Turkish president Erdoğan on Twitter, calling him the "Hitler of our century". Soon after the coup attempt in July, his father and his family publicly disowned him due to his political views and his support for Gülen, imploring him to change his surname, on August 8. Kanter stated that he loves Gülen "more than his family", informally changing his name to Enes Gülen. His father was dismissed from his university position a few weeks later, via government decree numbered 272 on September 1, as part of the 2016–17 Turkish purges. Kanter also received backlash from former NBA player Hedo Türkoğlu. Turkoglu called Kanter's comments "irrational".

In Turkey, Kanter's father was charged as a member of a terrorist group in 2018 along with 127,000 other Turkish citizens. He was arrested, then was released after being detained for five days. Kanter believed his father was targeted by the Turkish government and could face many years in prison. Kanter was unable to contact his friends and family back in Turkey because he feared the conversations would be taped and they would be harmed. Six days after the cancellation of his passport, the Turkish government issued an arrest warrant for Kanter due to his membership in Hizmet, a faith-based civil society inspired by Turkish cleric Fethullah Gülen, focusing on promoting interfaith dialogue and education throughout the world. Turkey said that charged citizens who fail to come to Turkey during September 2017 face revocation of citizenship; in September 2017, Kanter described himself as stateless. According to Sports Illustrated, "Although Kanter might dismiss the Turkish arrest warrant as toothless, he faces the more impactful problem of being a man without a country." In December 2017, the Associated Press reported that Turkish prosecutors were seeking more than four years in prison for Kanter, who would be tried in absentia.

Also in January 2019, Turkey put an extradition request on Kanter and requested that Interpol put a red notice for his arrest. However, according to Interpol's website, no red notice was issued. U.S. Senator Ron Wyden of Oregon took up Kanter's cause, stating "The United States must not stay silent in the face of such a blatant attack on free thought and expression." Kanter later credited the bond he and Wyden had forged as part of the reason he sacrificed salary to facilitate a trade back to Portland in 2020.

It was reported on January 19, 2023, the Turkish government placed a ₺500,000 bounty on Enes Kanter and his name was added to the "Grey Tier", the lowest of the Turkish Interior Ministry's five-tiered wanted terrorist list. In response, Kanter said "The only thing I terrorize is the basketball rim."

=== Travel disruptions ===
In May 2017, while on a tour hosting basketball camps in Hong Kong and Japan and other parts of Asia, Kanter was in Jakarta, Indonesia. At 2:30 am, Kanter's manager knocked on his door with alarming information. He was told that two men identifying themselves as Indonesian government officials had visited the camp and wanted to find out if Kanter was sleeping at the camp, which he often did. Kanter, staying at a hotel with his manager, instead immediately left Indonesia, traveling to Singapore, then Bucharest, Romania via Frankfurt, Germany. On May 20, 2017, when trying to fly into Romania – where another camp was planned to be held – Kanter was not allowed into the country and was told by officials there that his passport had been cancelled by the Turkish embassy. Kanter was temporarily stranded in Romania, but eventually flew to London and then back to the United States. While stuck in Romania, Kanter took to Twitter to explain his situation and the hashtag #FreeEnes went viral. Upon landing in the US, Kanter said the first thing he did was pray.

In January 2019, he decided against traveling to London with the Knicks, fearing that his life could be in danger if he traveled to Europe. Kanter did not travel to Toronto with the Portland Trail Blazers in March 2019 for the same reason. According to a 2019 ESPN story, FBI agents issued him a communications device that allows him to contact the organization at a moment's notice due to credible threats against his life.

=== Palestine and Israel ===
Kanter was listed in April 2021 as "one of the leading pro-Israel influencers online". He attended an event hosted by diplomats from the US, UAE, Bahrain, and Israel on September the same year celebrating the anniversary of the Abraham Accords, which marked normalisation of relations between Israel and the two Arab countries. In November 2020, Kanter also met with Israeli diplomat Gilad Erdan and talked of joining forces to combat antisemitism.

Following the October 7 attack on Israel, Kanter condemned Hamas for their actions. He criticized Erdogan for not calling Hamas a terrorist group and stated the slogan "From the river to the sea" meant supporting the destruction of Israel and called college protestors using it brainwashed.

=== China ===
In 2019, Kanter was the subject of an E:60 ESPN documentary called Enemy of the State. In October 2021, he condemned Xi Jinping, the Chinese paramount leader, as a "brutal dictator" and expressed his support for the Free Tibet movement on Twitter. In retaliation, the Chinese government stopped streaming all Boston Celtics games. Also in October, he led a rally in Washington, D.C., urging the U.S. Congress to pass the Uyghur Forced Labor Prevention Act, a law that would limit imports from the alleged areas where China has oppressed Uyghurs, Kazakhs, and Kyrgyz minorities.

On October 25, 2021, Kanter wore a pair of shoes emblazoned with the words "Free China" and featuring Winnie the Pooh. The shoes had been designed together with the Shanghai-born, Australia-based dissident cartoonist Badiucao. Earlier during the week, Kanter had worn other shoes with the messages "Free Tibet" and "Free Uyghur".

In November 2021, Kanter appeared in interviews on Fox News and CNN advocating for the boycott of the 2022 Winter Olympic Games in China. On December 6, 2021, the United States announced a diplomatic boycott of the games, meaning that athletes may still participate but no "diplomatic or official representation" will be sent from the United States government.

After Kanter was waived out of his most recent contract, he claimed he was pushed out of the NBA to appease the Chinese state. Adam Silver and the NBA have denied that Kanter's activism led to him being blackballed.

In June 2022, Kanter took part in a press conference with Canadian Senator Leo Housakos and Canadian MP Garnett Genuis. In this press conference, Kanter spoke about how his interest in the Uighurs in China began. The Canadian Government was called upon to halt the importation of goods that were made with forced labor from the province of Xinjiang.

In January 2023, Kanter sat down with journalist John Stossel in an interview titled, "The FULL Enes Kanter Freedom: On China, NBA Hypocrisy, LeBron & Cena", where he summarized his experiences pushing back against countries, including China, that don't allow freedom of speech for their citizens, and criticized LeBron James and John Cena for their China ties.

=== United States ===
Kanter has also met with several US congressional members, including former Democratic speaker Nancy Pelosi and current Republican speaker Mike Johnson, attending the 2024 State of the Union as a guest of the latter. He then stated he plans to run for Congress in 2028, when he will have been a US citizen for 7 years and eligible to do so.

On April 16, 2024, Kanter testified before Congress about Turkey’s human rights abuses, attacks on him and his family, including imprisonment of his father.

=== Women's basketball ===
On August 7, 2026, Kanter announced that he had officially declared for the 2027 WNBA draft to challenge the concept of transgender women playing in the WNBA despite there having never been a trans woman in the league. He claimed that he meets the eligibility guidelines through self identification. At about the same time, Republican politician and former NBA player Royce White announced his own candidacy for playing in women's professional basketball.

The move created significant controversy. In response, the WNBA players' union stated, "We embrace justice, equity, diversity and inclusion. Those are the values that unite this Union and allow it to protect women's sports while creating transformational change", adding that "hate, abuse, and demonization of any person or group of people, including transgender people, only fuel fear, division, and harm". The WNBA's statement went on the declare that the players "will not be used as political pawns".

On August 23, 2026, Kanter attended a game between the Chicago Sky and the Indiana Fever (without a ticket having been purchased in his name) and was involved in an altercation with Natasha Cloud before being escorted out of the arena.

== Personal life ==
In 2019, he wrote in The Washington Post about the challenge of observing Ramadan during the NBA playoffs, which includes daytime fasting while still playing NBA basketball games.

He has said that he learned English during college by watching SpongeBob SquarePants and Jersey Shore.

He began following a plant-based diet in 2020, with the goal of switching to a vegan lifestyle.

Kanter became an American citizen on November 29, 2021, and also legally changed his name to Enes Kanter Freedom at the same time to mark the occasion.

== Philanthropy ==
During the summer of 2018, Kanter held 16 free basketball camps in the United States. Also in the same year, Kanter started a fundraiser for wildfire victims in Greece. In the summer of 2019, 40 free basketball camps were initially scheduled, but he ultimately hosted 50. Another 50 free camps were planned for the summer of 2020.

=== Abrahamic Accords Basketball School ===
In December 2023, Freedom announced his plans to create basketball schools all over the world that brings Christians, Muslims and Jews together to play basketball.

== Works and publications ==
- Kanter, Enes (May 23, 2017). "They Can Take Away Your Country, Just Like That". The Players' Tribune.
- Kanter, Enes (May 9, 2019). "Enes Kanter: When Ramadan and the NBA playoffs collide, my faith is my strength". The Washington Post.
- Kanter, Enes (November 20, 2021). "Enes Kanter: Move the Olympics for Peng Shuai's Sake". The Wall Street Journal.
- Freedom Kanter, Enes (Oct 7, 2025). "In the Name of Freedom: A Political Dissident's Fight for Human Rights in the NBA and Around the World".

== See also ==
- List of NBA career field goal percentage leaders
- List of NBA single-game rebounding leaders
- List of youngest EuroLeague players
