= 2019 NBA playoffs =

Professional basketball tournament to determine the 2019 champion of the NBA

Tournament details
- Dates: April 13 – June 13, 2019
- Season: 2018–19
- Teams: 16

Final positions
- Champions: Toronto Raptors (1st title)
- Runners-up: Golden State Warriors
- Semifinalists: Portland Trail Blazers; Milwaukee Bucks

Tournament statistics
- Scoring leader(s): Kawhi Leonard (Raptors) (30.5 PPG)

Awards
- MVP: Kawhi Leonard (Raptors)

The 2019 NBA playoffs was the postseason tournament of the National Basketball Association's (NBA) 2018–19 season. The playoffs began on April 13 and ended on June 13 with the Toronto Raptors defeating the two-time defending champions Golden State Warriors in the 2019 NBA Finals. It was Toronto's first NBA championship in franchise history. Game 6 of the Finals was the last game to be played at the Oracle Arena in Oakland before moving to the Chase Center in San Francisco for the 2019–20 season.

The Los Angeles Clippers set the record for the largest comeback in NBA playoff history, overcoming a 31-point deficit against the Warriors. The Portland Trail Blazers' quadruple-overtime victory in game 3 of the conference semifinals against the Denver Nuggets was the longest NBA playoff game since 1953. The Raptors' Kawhi Leonard made the first ever game-winning buzzer beater in a game seven, which he did against the Philadelphia 76ers in the second round.

Due to the COVID-19 pandemic, this was the last postseason until 2022 to be played in its traditional April through June schedule. This was also the last NBA Finals featuring coaches wearing formal business attire, as the business attire for coaches was completely abandoned following the 2020 pandemic.

== Overview ==
=== Western Conference ===
- The Denver Nuggets made the playoffs for the first time in six years.
- The Golden State Warriors entered the postseason for the seventh straight year, a new franchise record. This was also their final season at Oracle Arena, as they moved to the new Chase Center the following season. They won the championship in 2015, 2017 and 2018.
- The San Antonio Spurs made the playoffs for the 22nd consecutive season; they have not missed the playoffs since drafting Tim Duncan, who retired in 2016. Until 2026, this was their most recent postseason appearance.
- The Los Angeles Clippers made the playoffs for the first time since 2017, featuring a roster without Blake Griffin, Chris Paul, or DeAndre Jordan.
- The Los Angeles Lakers missed the playoffs for the sixth year in a row despite the addition of LeBron James. This was also the first NBA Playoffs to not feature James since 2005.

=== Eastern Conference ===
- The Milwaukee Bucks entered the postseason with a 60–win season, their first since 1980–81, and with the best record in the league, the first time that has occurred since 1973–74.
- The Orlando Magic made the playoffs for the first time since 2012, breaking the longest Eastern Conference playoff appearance drought to date.
- The Brooklyn Nets made the playoffs for the first time in four years.
- The Detroit Pistons made the playoffs for the first time since 2016.
- The Cleveland Cavaliers, despite being the four-time defending Eastern Conference Champions, missed the playoffs for the first time since 2014, largely due to the departure of LeBron James to the Los Angeles Lakers.
- The Miami Heat missed the playoffs for the third time in five years.

=== First round ===
- In Game 2 of their series against the reigning champion Golden State Warriors, the Los Angeles Clippers completed the largest comeback in NBA playoff history, overcoming a 31–point deficit.
- Game 3 of the Bucks–Pistons series was the first playoff game played in the city of Detroit since Game 6 of the 1985 Eastern Conference semifinals, which took place at Joe Louis Arena. Postseason games featuring the Pistons had previously been held in the Palace of Auburn Hills and the Pontiac Silverdome.
- The Boston Celtics swept the Indiana Pacers in the first round, marking the 43rd straight year a sweep occurred in the NBA playoffs. The last year a sweep did not occur in the playoffs was 1976. It was also the Celtics’ first playoff sweep since 2011.
- With their first round sweep of the Detroit Pistons, the Milwaukee Bucks won their first series since 2001 when they defeated the Charlotte Hornets in the conference semifinals.
- Game 5 of the Trail Blazers–Thunder series was extremely notable thanks to Damian Lillard's 37 foot series winning 3–pointer over Paul George, capping a 118–115 victory for the Portland Trail Blazers. It was the second series winning three pointer made by Damian Lillard (the other being in 2014 against the Houston Rockets). It would also be Paul George's and Russell Westbrook's final game as members of the Oklahoma City Thunder.
- The Nuggets–Spurs series was the first of the 2019 playoffs to have a Game 7, making it the 20th consecutive NBA postseason with a Game 7. The last time a Game 7 did not take place in the playoffs was in 1999.
- All of the top seeds won the first round for the first time since 2008.

=== Conference semifinals ===
- Game 3 of the Trail Blazers–Nuggets series was the first quadruple overtime game played in the playoffs since 1955 (and second overall), as well as the first quadruple overtime game ever played during the shot clock era.
- With their conference semifinals victory over the Boston Celtics, the Milwaukee Bucks made the Eastern Conference finals for the first time since 2001. In addition, this was the first time since 1983 that the Bucks defeated the Celtics in a playoff series.
- Kawhi Leonard scored the first Game 7 buzzer-beater in NBA history, helping the Toronto Raptors defeat the Philadelphia 76ers 92–90 in the second round.
- Game 7 of the Nuggets–Blazers series was extremely notable for CJ McCollum's block on Jamal Murray, evoking memories of a similar block in 2016.
- With their Game 7 victory Portland Trail Blazers advanced to the Western Conference finals for the first time since 2000. They also won a Game 7 on the road for the first time in franchise history.
- The Warriors–Rockets series is notable for Stephen Curry's 33–point second half. With their series victory, they advanced to the Western Conference finals for the fifth consecutive season.

=== Conference finals ===
- Stephen Curry (Warriors) and Seth Curry (Portland Trail Blazers) played each other in the Western Conference finals, becoming the first set of brothers to face each other in an NBA playoff series.
- With their Western Conference finals sweep against the Portland Trail Blazers, the Golden State Warriors earned their fifth consecutive trip to the NBA Finals, making them the second franchise in the NBA postseason history to do so after the Boston Celtics did it in ten consecutive years, starting from 1957 to 1966.
- The Portland Trail Blazers earned the dubious distinction of losing three straight games to the Golden State Warriors despite posting double digit leads in Games 2, 3, and 4.
- With their Eastern Conference finals victory over the Milwaukee Bucks, the Toronto Raptors advanced on to the NBA Finals for the first time in franchise history.
- Stephen Curry surpassed Shaquille O'Neal for most points in a sweep with 146 points.

=== NBA Finals ===
- The Toronto Raptors won the NBA Championship for the first time in franchise history, defeating the Golden State Warriors in six games in the 2019 NBA Finals.
- Game 1 was the first ever NBA Finals game played outside the US.
- Kawhi Leonard joined Kareem Abdul-Jabbar and LeBron James as the only players to win Finals MVP with more than one team, and became the first Finals MVP winner from both conferences.
- Game 6 of the 2019 NBA Finals was the last NBA game ever played at Oracle Arena, as well as the final NBA game ever played in Oakland.
- Game 5 of the Warriors–Raptors series was extremely notable as Kevin Durant ruptured his Achilles in an attempt to return to the playoffs, previously injuring it whilst playing the Clippers.

== Format ==
Within each conference, the eight teams with the most wins qualified for the playoffs. The seedings were based on each team's record.

Each conference's bracket was fixed; there was no reseeding. All rounds were best-of-seven series; the series ended when one team won four games, and that team advanced to the next round. All rounds, including the NBA Finals, were in a 2–2–1–1–1 format. In the conference playoffs, home court advantage went to the higher-seeded team (number one being the highest). Seeding was based on each team's regular season record within a conference; if two teams had the same record, standard tiebreaker rules were used. Conference seedings were ignored for the NBA Finals: Home court advantage went to the team with the better regular season record, and, if needed, ties were broken based on head-to-head record, followed by intra-conference record.

== Playoff qualifying ==
On March 1, 2019, the Milwaukee Bucks became the first team to clinch a playoff spot.

=== Eastern Conference ===
Seed	Team	Record	Clinched			
Seed	Team	Record	Playoff berth	Division title	Best record in conference	Best record in NBA
1	Milwaukee Bucks	60–22	March 1	March 21	April 4	April 4
2	Toronto Raptors	58–24	March 9	April 1	—	—
3	Philadelphia 76ers	51–31	March 17	—	—	—
4	Boston Celtics	49–33	March 26	—	—	—
5	Indiana Pacers	48–34	March 22	—	—	—
6	Brooklyn Nets (Note: Brooklyn clinched #6 seed over Orlando based on 2–1 head-to-head record.)	42–40	April 7	—	—	—
7	Orlando Magic	42–40	April 7	April 7	—	—
8	Detroit Pistons	41–41	April 10	—	—	—

=== Western Conference ===
Seed	Team	Record	Clinched			
Seed	Team	Record	Playoff berth	Division title	Best record in conference	Best record in NBA
1	Golden State Warriors	57–25	March 16	March 31	April 7	—
2	Denver Nuggets	54–28	March 18	April 5	—	—
3	Portland Trail Blazers (Note: Portland clinched #3 seed over Houston based on 2–1 head-to-head record.)	53–29	March 25	—	—	—
4	Houston Rockets	53–29	March 24	March 31	—	—
5	Utah Jazz	50–32	March 28	—	—	—
6	Oklahoma City Thunder	49–33	March 30	—	—	—
7	San Antonio Spurs (Note: San Antonio clinched #7 seed over L.A. Clippers based on 30–22 record against teams in Western Conference (as opposed to L.A. Clippers 28–24 record).)	48–34	March 30	—	—	—
8	Los Angeles Clippers	48–34	March 26	—	—	—

== Bracket ==
Teams in bold advanced to the next round. The numbers to the left of each team indicate the team's seeding in its conference, and the numbers to the right indicate the number of games the team won in that round. The division champions are marked by an asterisk. Teams with home-court advantage, the higher-seeded team, are shown in italics.

First round	Second round
**E1**	**Milwaukee***	**4**
E8	Detroit	0
**E1**	**Milwaukee***	**4**
E4	Boston	1
**E4**	**Boston**	4
E5	Indiana	0
**Eastern Conference**
**E3**	**Philadelphia**	**4**
E6	Brooklyn	1
E3	Philadelphia	3
**E2**	**Toronto***	**4**
**E2**	**Toronto***	**4**
E7	Orlando*	1
**W1**	**Golden State***	**4**
W8	LA Clippers	2
**W1**	**Golden State***	**4**
W4	Houston*	2
**W4**	**Houston***	**4**
W5	Utah	1
**Western Conference**
**W3**	**Portland**	**4**
W6	Oklahoma City	1
**W3**	**Portland**	**4**
W2	Denver*	3
**W2**	**Denver***	**4**
W7	San Antonio	3

Conference finals
E1	Milwaukee*	2
**E2**	**Toronto***	**4**
**W1**	**Golden State***	**4**
W3	Portland	0

NBA Finals
**E2**	**Toronto***	**4**
W1	Golden State*	2

- * Division winner
- **Bold** Series winner
- Italic Team with home-court advantage

== First round ==
Note: Times are EDT (UTC−4) as listed by the NBA. If the venue is located in a different time zone, the local time is also given.

=== Eastern Conference first round ===
==== (1) Milwaukee Bucks vs. (8) Detroit Pistons ====
TNT

April 14
7:00pm (6:00 pm CDT)

Box score

Detroit Pistons 86, Milwaukee Bucks 121
Scoring by quarter: 18–38, 25–32, 18–27, 25–24
Pts: Luke Kennard 21; Rebs: Andre Drummond 12; Asts: Ish Smith 6	Pts: Giannis Antetokounmpo 24; Rebs: Giannis Antetokounmpo 17; Asts: Sterling Brown 7
Milwaukee leads series, 1–0

Fiserv Forum, Milwaukee, Wisconsin
Attendance: 17,529
Referees: Tony Brothers, Pat Fraher, Kevin Cutler

NBA TV

April 17
8:00pm (7:00 pm CDT)

Box score

Detroit Pistons 99, Milwaukee Bucks 120
Scoring by quarter: 27–38, 32–20, 17–35, 23–27
Pts: Luke Kennard 19; Rebs: Andre Drummond 16; Asts: Reggie Jackson 8	Pts: Eric Bledsoe 27; Rebs: Giannis Antetokounmpo 12; Asts: Khris Middleton 8
Milwaukee leads series, 2–0

Fiserv Forum, Milwaukee, Wisconsin
Attendance: 17,513
Referees: Eric Lewis, Mike Callahan, Rodney Mott

ESPN

April 20
8:00pm

Box score

Milwaukee Bucks 119, Detroit Pistons 103
Scoring by quarter: 32–24, 35–30, 33–24, 19–25
Pts: Khris Middleton 20; Rebs: Giannis Antetokounmpo 10; Asts: Bledsoe, Hill 5 each	Pts: Blake Griffin 27; Rebs: Andre Drummond 12; Asts: Reggie Jackson 8
Milwaukee leads series, 3–0

Little Caesars Arena, Detroit, Michigan
Attendance: 20,520
Referees: James Capers, Kane Fitzgerald, Curtis Blair

TNT

April 22
8:00pm

Box score

Milwaukee Bucks 127, Detroit Pistons 104
Scoring by quarter: 26–28, 30–34, 39–23, 32–19
Pts: Giannis Antetokounmpo 41; Rebs: Sterling Brown 13; Asts: Sterling Brown 6	Pts: Reggie Jackson 26; Rebs: Andre Drummond 12; Asts: Reggie Jackson 7
Milwaukee wins series, 4–0

Little Caesars Arena, Detroit, Michigan
Attendance: 20,332
Referees: Ken Mauer, Tony Brown, Derrick Collins

Regular-season series
Milwaukee won 4–0 in the regular-season series

December 5, 2018

Recap

Detroit Pistons 92, Milwaukee Bucks 115

Fiserv Forum, Milwaukee, Wisconsin

December 17, 2018

Recap

Milwaukee Bucks 107, Detroit Pistons 104

Little Caesars Arena, Detroit, Michigan

January 1, 2019

Recap

Detroit Pistons 98, Milwaukee Bucks 121

Fiserv Forum, Milwaukee, Wisconsin

January 29, 2019

Recap

Milwaukee Bucks 115, Detroit Pistons 105

Little Caesars Arena, Detroit, Michigan

This was the fifth playoff meeting between these two teams, with the Pistons winning all four of the previous meetings. This was the Bucks first playoff win since 2001.

Previous playoffs series
Detroit leads 4–0 in all-time playoff series

1976

Milwaukee Bucks 1, Detroit Pistons 2

1976 Western Conference First Round

1989

Detroit Pistons 4, Milwaukee Bucks 0

1989 Eastern Conference semifinals

2004

Detroit Pistons 4, Milwaukee Bucks 1

2004 Eastern Conference First Round

2006

Detroit Pistons 4, Milwaukee Bucks 1

2006 Eastern Conference First Round

==== (2) Toronto Raptors vs. (7) Orlando Magic ====
ESPN, SN1

April 13
5:00pm

Box score

Orlando Magic 104, Toronto Raptors 101
Scoring by quarter: 25–30, 32–19, 18–27, 29–25
Pts: D. J. Augustin 25; Rebs: Aaron Gordon 10; Asts: D. J. Augustin 6	Pts: Kawhi Leonard 25; Rebs: Pascal Siakam 8 Asts: Kyle Lowry 8
Orlando leads series, 1–0

Scotiabank Arena, Toronto, Ontario
Attendance: 19,937
Referees: Mike Callahan, Eric Lewis, Ben Taylor

- In Game 1, D. J. Augustin hit the game-winning three-point shot with 3.4 seconds left.

TNT, TSN

April 16
8:00pm

Box score

Orlando Magic 82, Toronto Raptors 111
Scoring by quarter: 18–26, 21–25, 27–39, 16–21
Pts: Aaron Gordon 20; Rebs: Michael Carter-Williams 9 Asts: D. J. Augustin 4	Pts: Kawhi Leonard 37; Rebs: Pascal Siakam 10; Asts: Kyle Lowry 7
Series tied, 1–1

Scotiabank Arena, Toronto, Ontario
Attendance: 19,964
Referees: Marc Davis, John Goble, Kevin Cutler

ESPN, SN1

April 19
7:00pm

Box score

Toronto Raptors 98, Orlando Magic 93
Scoring by quarter: 26–21, 22–24, 28–20, 22–28
Pts: Pascal Siakam 30; Rebs: Pascal Siakam 11; Asts: Kyle Lowry 10	Pts: Terrence Ross 24; Rebs: Nikola Vučević 14; Asts: Aaron Gordon 7
Toronto leads series, 2–1

Amway Center, Orlando, Florida
Attendance: 19,367
Referees: Tony Brothers, Sean Wright, Michael Smith

TNT, TSN

April 21
7:00pm

Box score

Toronto Raptors 107, Orlando Magic 85
Scoring by quarter: 28–26, 30–16, 24–28, 25–15
Pts: Kawhi Leonard 34; Rebs: Serge Ibaka 8 Asts: Kyle Lowry 9	Pts: Aaron Gordon 25; Rebs: Aaron Gordon 7 Asts: Aaron Gordon 5
Toronto leads series, 3–1

Amway Center, Orlando, Florida
Attendance: 19,087
Referees: Zach Zarba, Tom Washington, Karl Lane

NBA TV, TSN

April 23
7:00pm

Box score

Orlando Magic 96, Toronto Raptors 115
Scoring by quarter: 19–35, 28–32, 23–32, 26–16
Pts: D. J. Augustin 15; Rebs: Khem Birch 11; Asts: Michael Carter-Williams 5	Pts: Kawhi Leonard 27; Rebs: Marc Gasol 9 Asts: Fred VanVleet 10
Toronto wins series, 4–1

Scotiabank Arena, Toronto, Ontario
Attendance: 19,800
Referees: Scott Foster, Jason Phillips, Tyler Ford

Regular-season series
Tied 2–2 in the regular-season series

November 20, 2018

Recap

Toronto Raptors 93, Orlando Magic 91

Amway Center, Orlando, Florida

December 28, 2018

Recap

Toronto Raptors 87, Orlando Magic 116

Amway Center, Orlando, Florida

February 24, 2019

Recap

Orlando Magic 113, Toronto Raptors 98

Scotiabank Arena, Toronto, Ontario

April 1, 2019

Recap

Orlando Magic 109, Toronto Raptors 121

Scotiabank Arena, Toronto, Ontario

This was the second playoff meeting between these two teams, with the Magic winning the first meeting.

Previous playoffs series
Orlando leads 1–0 in all-time playoff series

2008

Orlando Magic 4, Toronto Raptors 1

2008 Eastern Conference First Round

==== (3) Philadelphia 76ers vs. (6) Brooklyn Nets ====
ESPN

April 13
2:30pm

Box score

Brooklyn Nets 111, Philadelphia 76ers 102
Scoring by quarter: 31–22, 31–32, 31–28, 18–20
Pts: D'Angelo Russell 26; Rebs: Ed Davis 16; Asts: Dudley, Russell 4 each	Pts: Jimmy Butler 36; Rebs: Joel Embiid 15; Asts: Tobias Harris 6
Brooklyn leads series, 1–0

Wells Fargo Center, Philadelphia, Pennsylvania
Attendance: 20,437
Referees: Scott Foster, Jason Phillips, Tyler Ford

TNT

April 15
8:00pm

Box score

Brooklyn Nets 123, Philadelphia 76ers 145
Scoring by quarter: 28–34, 36–31, 23–51, 36–29
Pts: Spencer Dinwiddie 19; Rebs: Jarrett Allen 6 Asts: Jarrett Allen 4	Pts: Joel Embiid 23; Rebs: Embiid, Simmons 10 each Asts: Ben Simmons 12
Series tied, 1–1

Wells Fargo Center, Philadelphia, Pennsylvania
Attendance: 20,591
Referees: Mike Callahan, Kevin Scott, Gediminas Petraitis

TNT

April 18
8:00pm

Box score

Philadelphia 76ers 131, Brooklyn Nets 115
Scoring by quarter: 32–24, 33–35, 32–31, 34–25
Pts: Ben Simmons 31; Rebs: Tobias Harris 16; Asts: Ben Simmons 9	Pts: D'Angelo Russell 26; Rebs: Caris LeVert 7 Asts: Russell, Hollis-Jefferson 4 each
Philadelphia leads series, 2–1

Barclays Center, Brooklyn, New York City
Attendance: 17,732
Referees: James Capers, Courtney Kirkland, Scott Wall

TNT

April 20
3:00pm

Box score

Philadelphia 76ers 112, Brooklyn Nets 108
Scoring by quarter: 24–33, 33–30, 28–28, 27–17
Pts: Joel Embiid 31; Rebs: Joel Embiid 16; Asts: Ben Simmons 8	Pts: Caris LeVert 25; Rebs: Jarrett Allen 8 Asts: LeVert, Russell 6 each
Philadelphia leads series, 3–1

Barclays Center, Brooklyn, New York City
Attendance: 17,732
Referees: Ed Malloy, David Guthrie, Ben Taylor

TNT

April 23
8:00pm

Box score

Brooklyn Nets 100, Philadelphia 76ers 122
Scoring by quarter: 15–32, 16–28, 33–35, 36–27
Pts: Rondae Hollis-Jefferson 21; Rebs: Jarrett Allen 9 Asts: Shabazz Napier 10	Pts: Joel Embiid 23; Rebs: Joel Embiid 13; Asts: T. J. McConnell 7
Philadelphia wins series, 4–1

Wells Fargo Center, Philadelphia, Pennsylvania
Attendance: 20,595
Referees: Zach Zarba, Tom Washington, Brian Forte

Regular-season series
Tied 2–2 in the regular-season series

November 4, 2018

Recap

Philadelphia 76ers 97, Brooklyn Nets 122

Barclays Center, Brooklyn, New York City

November 25, 2018

Recap

Philadelphia 76ers 127, Brooklyn Nets 125

Barclays Center, Brooklyn, New York City

December 12, 2018

Recap

Brooklyn Nets 127, Philadelphia 76ers 124

Wells Fargo Center, Philadelphia, Pennsylvania

March 28, 2019

Recap

Brooklyn Nets 110, Philadelphia 76ers 123

Wells Fargo Center, Philadelphia, Pennsylvania

This was the third playoff meeting between these two teams, but the first since the New Jersey Nets relocated to Brooklyn and became the Brooklyn Nets in 2012, with each team winning one series.

Previous playoffs series
Tied 1–1 in all-time playoff series

1979

Philadelphia 76ers 2, New Jersey Nets 0

1979 Eastern Conference First Round

1984

Philadelphia 76ers 2, New Jersey Nets 3

1984 Eastern Conference First Round

==== (4) Boston Celtics vs. (5) Indiana Pacers ====
TNT

April 14
1:00pm

Box score

Indiana Pacers 74, Boston Celtics 84
Scoring by quarter: 20–20, 25–18, 8–26, 21–20
Pts: Cory Joseph 14; Rebs: Domantas Sabonis 9 Asts: Thaddeus Young 6	Pts: Irving, Morris 20 each Rebs: Al Horford 11; Asts: Kyrie Irving 7
Boston leads series, 1–0

TD Garden, Boston, Massachusetts
Attendance: 18,624
Referees: James Capers, Kane Fitzgerald, Brian Forte

TNT

April 17
7:00pm

Box score

Indiana Pacers 91, Boston Celtics 99
Scoring by quarter: 33–29, 17–23, 29–16, 12–31
Pts: Bojan Bogdanović 23; Rebs: Bojan Bogdanović 8 Asts: Sabonis, Matthews 5 each	Pts: Kyrie Irving 37; Rebs: Al Horford 10; Asts: Kyrie Irving 7
Boston leads series, 2–0

TD Garden, Boston, Massachusetts
Attendance: 18,624
Referees: Sean Wright, Tony Brothers, Kevin Scott

ABC

April 19
8:30pm

Box score

Boston Celtics 104, Indiana Pacers 96
Scoring by quarter: 41–28, 18–33, 21–12, 24–23
Pts: Jaylen Brown 23; Rebs: Al Horford 8 Asts: Kyrie Irving 10	Pts: Tyreke Evans 19; Rebs: Thaddeus Young 9 Asts: Domantas Sabonis 6
Boston leads series, 3–0

Bankers Life Fieldhouse, Indianapolis, Indiana
Attendance: 17,923
Referees: Zach Zarba, Pat Fraher, Tyler Ford

ABC

April 21
1:00pm

Box score

Boston Celtics 110, Indiana Pacers 106
Scoring by quarter: 21–23, 26–26, 26–23, 37–34
Pts: Gordon Hayward 20; Rebs: Al Horford 12; Asts: Kyrie Irving 7	Pts: Bojan Bogdanović 22; Rebs: Thaddeus Young 9 Asts: Darren Collison 5
Boston wins series, 4–0

Bankers Life Fieldhouse, Indianapolis, Indiana
Attendance: 17,923
Referees: Marc Davis, John Goble, Courtney Kirkland

Regular-season series
Boston won 3–1 in the regular-season series

November 3, 2018

Recap

Boston Celtics 101, Indiana Pacers 102

Bankers Life Fieldhouse, Indianapolis, Indiana

January 9, 2019

Recap

Indiana Pacers 108, Boston Celtics 135

TD Garden, Boston, Massachusetts

March 29, 2019

Recap

Indiana Pacers 112, Boston Celtics 114

TD Garden, Boston, Massachusetts

April 5, 2019

Recap

Boston Celtics 117, Indiana Pacers 97

Bankers Life Fieldhouse, Indianapolis, Indiana

This was the sixth playoff meeting between these two teams, with the Celtics winning three of the first five meetings.

Previous playoffs series
Boston leads 3–2 in all-time playoff series

1991

Boston Celtics 3, Indiana Pacers 2

1991 Eastern Conference First Round

1992

Boston Celtics 3, Indiana Pacers 0

1992 Eastern Conference First Round

2003

Indiana Pacers 2, Boston Celtics 4

2003 Eastern Conference First Round

2004

Indiana Pacers 4, Boston Celtics 0

2004 Eastern Conference First Round

2005

Boston Celtics 3, Indiana Pacers 4

2005 Eastern Conference First Round

- This is the most recent playoff series between the Celtics & Pacers until 2024.

=== Western Conference first round ===
==== (1) Golden State Warriors vs. (8) Los Angeles Clippers ====
ABC

April 13
8:00 pm (5:00 pm PDT)

Box score

Los Angeles Clippers 104, Golden State Warriors 121
Scoring by quarter: 27–36, 29–33, 23–29, 25–23
Pts: Montrezl Harrell 26; Rebs: Danilo Gallinari 8 Asts: Lou Williams 9	Pts: Stephen Curry 38; Rebs: Stephen Curry 15; Asts: Curry, Green 7 each
Golden State leads series, 1–0

Oracle Arena, Oakland, California
Attendance: 19,596
Referees: Ed Malloy, Courtney Kirkland, Mark Lindsay

TNT

April 15
10:30pm (7:30 pm PDT)

Box score

Los Angeles Clippers 135, Golden State Warriors 131
Scoring by quarter: 25–33, 25–40, 44–35, 41–23
Pts: Lou Williams 36; Rebs: Montrezl Harrell 10; Asts: Lou Williams 11	Pts: Stephen Curry 29; Rebs: Andrew Bogut 9 Asts: Draymond Green 9
Series tied, 1–1

Oracle Arena, Oakland, California
Attendance: 19,596
Referees: Ken Mauer, Josh Tiven, Nick Buchert

The Clippers trailed 94–63 with 7:31 remaining in the third quarter of Game 2. They would go on to outscore Golden State 72–37 en route to overcoming a 31-point deficit, the largest comeback in NBA playoff history.

TNT

April 18
10:30pm (7:30 pm PDT)

Box score

Golden State Warriors 132, Los Angeles Clippers 105
Scoring by quarter: 41–24, 32–28, 36–24, 23–29
Pts: Kevin Durant 38; Rebs: Andrew Bogut 14; Asts: Draymond Green 10	Pts: Ivica Zubac 18; Rebs: Ivica Zubac 15; Asts: Lou Williams 6
Golden State leads series, 2–1

Staples Center, Los Angeles, California
Attendance: 19,068
Referees: Scott Foster, Jason Phillips, Scott Twardoski

ABC

April 21
3:30pm (12:30 pm PDT)

Box score

Golden State Warriors 113, Los Angeles Clippers 105
Scoring by quarter: 32–22, 30–32, 25–30, 26–21
Pts: Kevin Durant 33; Rebs: Bogut, Curry 10 each Asts: Stephen Curry 7	Pts: Shai Gilgeous-Alexander 25; Rebs: Patrick Beverley 10; Asts: Patrick Beverley 5
Golden State leads series, 3–1

Staples Center, Los Angeles, California
Attendance: 19,068
Referees: Tony Brothers, Sean Wright, Brent Barnaky

TNT

April 24
10:30pm (7:30 pm PDT)

Box score

Los Angeles Clippers 129, Golden State Warriors 121
Scoring by quarter: 37–41, 34–22, 33–31, 25–27
Pts: Lou Williams 33; Rebs: Patrick Beverley 14; Asts: Lou Williams 10	Pts: Kevin Durant 45; Rebs: Green, Looney 7 each Asts: Andre Iguodala 8
Golden State leads series, 3–2

Oracle Arena, Oakland, California
Attendance: 19,596
Referees: Marc Davis, John Goble, Pat Fraher

ESPN

April 26
10:00pm (7:00 pm PDT)

Box score

Golden State Warriors 129, Los Angeles Clippers 110
Scoring by quarter: 35–31, 37–22, 30–25, 27–32
Pts: Kevin Durant 50; Rebs: Draymond Green 14; Asts: Draymond Green 10	Pts: Danilo Gallinari 29; Rebs: Patrick Beverley 14; Asts: Beverley, Williams 7 each
Golden State wins series, 4–2

Staples Center, Los Angeles, California
Attendance: 19,068
Referees: Mike Callahan, David Guthrie, Kevin Scott

Regular-season series
Golden State won 3–1 in the regular-season series

November 12, 2018

Recap

Golden State Warriors 116, Los Angeles Clippers 121 (OT)

Staples Center, Los Angeles, California

December 23, 2018

Recap

Los Angeles Clippers 127, Golden State Warriors 129

Oracle Arena, Oakland, California

January 18, 2019

Recap

Golden State Warriors 112, Los Angeles Clippers 94

Staples Center, Los Angeles, California

April 7, 2019

Recap

Los Angeles Clippers 104, Golden State Warriors 131

Oracle Arena, Oakland, California

This was the second playoff meeting between these two teams, with the Clippers winning the first meeting.

Previous playoffs series
L.A. Clippers leads 1–0 in all-time playoff series

2014

Los Angeles Clippers 4, Golden State Warriors 3

2014 Western Conference First Round

==== (2) Denver Nuggets vs. (7) San Antonio Spurs ====
ESPN

April 13
10:30pm (8:30 pm MDT)

Box score

San Antonio Spurs 101, Denver Nuggets 96
Scoring by quarter: 25–20, 34–31, 13–17, 29–28
Pts: DeMar DeRozan 18; Rebs: DeMar DeRozan 12; Asts: DeMar DeRozan 6	Pts: Gary Harris 20; Rebs: Nikola Jokić 14; Asts: Nikola Jokić 14
San Antonio leads series, 1–0

Pepsi Center, Denver, Colorado
Attendance: 19,520
Referees: Ken Mauer, Josh Tiven, Tom Washington

NBA TV

April 16
9:00pm (7:00 pm MDT)

Box score

San Antonio Spurs 105, Denver Nuggets 114
Scoring by quarter: 26–21, 33–28, 23–26, 23–39
Pts: DeMar DeRozan 31; Rebs: Rudy Gay 9 Asts: Patty Mills 5	Pts: Jamal Murray 24; Rebs: Nikola Jokić 13; Asts: Nikola Jokić 8
Series tied, 1–1

Pepsi Center, Denver, Colorado
Attendance: 19,520
Referees: James Capers, Kane Fitzgerald, Derrick Collins

NBA TV

April 18
9:00pm (8:00 pm CDT)

Box score

Denver Nuggets 108, San Antonio Spurs 118
Scoring by quarter: 22–31, 36–30, 26–27, 24–30
Pts: Nikola Jokić 22; Rebs: Malik Beasley 9 Asts: three players 7 each	Pts: Derrick White 36; Rebs: Aldridge, Gay 11 each Asts: three players 5 each
San Antonio leads series, 2–1

AT&T Center, San Antonio, Texas
Attendance: 18,354
Referees: Ed Malloy, David Guthrie, Mark Lindsay

TNT

April 20
5:30pm (4:30 pm CDT)

Box score

Denver Nuggets 117, San Antonio Spurs 103
Scoring by quarter: 22–34, 32–20, 37–25, 26–24
Pts: Nikola Jokić 29; Rebs: Nikola Jokić 12; Asts: Nikola Jokić 8	Pts: LaMarcus Aldridge 24; Rebs: Aldridge, Pöltl 9 each Asts: DeRozan, White 5 each
Series tied, 2–2

AT&T Center, San Antonio, Texas
Attendance: 18,354
Referees: Scott Foster, Rodney Mott, Brian Forte

NBA TV

April 23
9:30pm (7:30 pm MDT)

Box score

San Antonio Spurs 90, Denver Nuggets 108
Scoring by quarter: 19–26, 23–27, 21–32, 27–23
Pts: Aldridge, DeRozan 17 each Rebs: LaMarcus Aldridge 10; Asts: Jakob Pöltl 4	Pts: Jamal Murray 23; Rebs: Nikola Jokić 11; Asts: Nikola Jokić 8
Denver leads series, 3–2

Pepsi Center, Denver, Colorado
Attendance: 19,520
Referees: Mike Callahan, Eric Lewis, Kevin Scott

TNT

April 25
8:00pm (7:00 pm CDT)

Box score

Denver Nuggets 103, San Antonio Spurs 120
Scoring by quarter: 24–34, 36–30, 25–26, 18–30
Pts: Nikola Jokić 43; Rebs: Nikola Jokić 12; Asts: Nikola Jokić 9	Pts: LaMarcus Aldridge 26; Rebs: LaMarcus Aldridge 10; Asts: DeMar DeRozan 7
Series tied, 3–3

AT&T Center, San Antonio, Texas
Attendance: 18,354
Referees: Zach Zarba, Josh Tiven, Tony Brown

TNT

April 27
10:00pm (8:00 pm MDT)

Box score

San Antonio Spurs 86, Denver Nuggets 90
Scoring by quarter: 13–23, 21–24, 27–25, 25–18
Pts: Rudy Gay 21; Rebs: LaMarcus Aldridge 11; Asts: DeMar DeRozan 6	Pts: Jamal Murray 23; Rebs: Nikola Jokić 15; Asts: Nikola Jokić 10
Denver wins series, 4–3

Pepsi Center, Denver, Colorado
Attendance: 19,725
Referees: Marc Davis, Tony Brothers, John Goble

Regular-season series
Series tied 2–2 in the regular-season

December 26, 2018

Recap

Denver Nuggets 103, San Antonio Spurs 111

AT&T Center, San Antonio, Texas

December 28, 2018

Recap

San Antonio Spurs 99, Denver Nuggets 102

Pepsi Center, Denver, Colorado

March 4, 2019

Recap

Denver Nuggets 103, San Antonio Spurs 104

AT&T Center, San Antonio, Texas

April 3, 2019

Recap

San Antonio Spurs 85, Denver Nuggets 113

Pepsi Center, Denver, Colorado

This was the seventh playoff meeting between these two teams, with the Spurs winning five of the first six meetings.

Previous playoffs series
San Antonio leads 5–1 in all-time playoff series

1983

San Antonio Spurs 4, Denver Nuggets 1

1983 Western Conference semifinals

1985

Denver Nuggets 3, San Antonio Spurs 2

1985 Western Conference First Round

1990

San Antonio Spurs 3, Denver Nuggets 0

1990 Western Conference First Round

1995

San Antonio Spurs 3, Denver Nuggets 0

1995 Western Conference First Round

2005

San Antonio Spurs 4, Denver Nuggets 1

2005 Western Conference First Round

2007

San Antonio Spurs 4, Denver Nuggets 1

2007 Western Conference First Round

==== (3) Portland Trail Blazers vs. (6) Oklahoma City Thunder ====
ABC

April 14
3:30pm (12:30 pm PDT)

Box score

Oklahoma City Thunder 99, Portland Trail Blazers 104
Scoring by quarter: 25–39, 23–15, 21–22, 30–28
Pts: Paul George 26; Rebs: Westbrook, George 10 each Asts: Russell Westbrook 10	Pts: Damian Lillard 30; Rebs: Enes Kanter 18; Asts: Damian Lillard 4
Portland leads series, 1–0

Moda Center, Portland, Oregon
Attendance: 19,886
Referees: Zach Zarba, Rodney Mott, Tre Maddox

TNT

April 16
10:30pm (7:30 pm PDT)

Box score

Oklahoma City Thunder 94, Portland Trail Blazers 114
Scoring by quarter: 31–26, 23–28, 21–37, 19–23
Pts: Paul George 27; Rebs: Adams, Westbrook 9 each Asts: Russell Westbrook 11	Pts: CJ McCollum 33; Rebs: Maurice Harkless 9 Asts: Damian Lillard 6
Portland leads series, 2–0

Moda Center, Portland, Oregon
Attendance: 20,041
Referees: Scott Foster, Jason Phillips, Karl Lane

ESPN

April 19
9:30pm (8:30 pm CDT)

Box score

Portland Trail Blazers 108, Oklahoma City Thunder 120
Scoring by quarter: 22–21, 17–28, 43–37, 26–34
Pts: Damian Lillard 32; Rebs: Al-Farouq Aminu 9 Asts: CJ McCollum 7	Pts: Russell Westbrook 33; Rebs: Steven Adams 7 Asts: Russell Westbrook 11
Portland leads series, 2–1

Chesapeake Energy Arena, Oklahoma City, Oklahoma
Attendance: 18,203
Referees: Marc Davis, Tony Brown, Nick Buchert

TNT

April 21
9:30pm (8:30 pm CDT)

Box score

Portland Trail Blazers 111, Oklahoma City Thunder 98
Scoring by quarter: 26–24, 24–22, 29–22, 32–30
Pts: CJ McCollum 27; Rebs: Harkless, Kanter 10 each Asts: Damian Lillard 8	Pts: Paul George 32; Rebs: Paul George 10; Asts: Russell Westbrook 7
Portland leads series, 3–1

Chesapeake Energy Arena, Oklahoma City, Oklahoma
Attendance: 18,203
Referees: Mike Callahan, Eric Lewis, Mark Lindsay

TNT

April 23
10:30pm (7:30 pm PDT)

Box score

Oklahoma City Thunder 115, Portland Trail Blazers 118
Scoring by quarter: 37–29, 23–32, 30–27, 25–30
Pts: Paul George 36; Rebs: Russell Westbrook 11; Asts: Russell Westbrook 14	Pts: Damian Lillard 50; Rebs: Enes Kanter 13; Asts: Damian Lillard 6
Portland wins series, 4–1

Moda Center, Portland, Oregon
Attendance: 20,241
Referees: James Capers, Kane Fitzgerald, Courtney Kirkland

Damian Lillard scored 50 points in Game 5 and finished off the series by hitting a 37-foot three at the buzzer to break a 115–115 tie, sending the Blazers through to the conference semifinals. This was Lillard's second series-winning 3-pointer; his first came against Houston in 2014. He is the only player besides Michael Jordan to hit two series-winning field goals. This was also the last Thunder game to feature both Russell Westbrook and Paul George.

Regular-season series
Oklahoma City won 4–0 in the regular-season series

January 4, 2019

Recap

Oklahoma City Thunder 111, Portland Trail Blazers 109

Moda Center, Portland, Oregon

January 22, 2019

Recap

Portland Trail Blazers 114, Oklahoma City Thunder 123

Chesapeake Energy Arena, Oklahoma City, Oklahoma

February 11, 2019

Recap

Portland Trail Blazers 111, Oklahoma City Thunder 120

Chesapeake Energy Arena, Oklahoma City, Oklahoma

March 7, 2019

Recap

Oklahoma City Thunder 129, Portland Trail Blazers 121 (OT)

Moda Center, Portland, Oregon

This was the fifth playoff meeting between the SuperSonics/Thunder and the Blazers, but the first since the Seattle SuperSonics relocated to Oklahoma City and became the Thunder in 2008. The two teams have split their previous four playoff matchups.

Previous playoffs series
Series tied 2–2 in all-time playoff series

1978

Portland Trail Blazers 2, Seattle SuperSonics 4

1978 Western Conference semifinals

1980

Seattle SuperSonics 2, Portland Trail Blazers 1

1980 Western Conference First Round

1983

Seattle SuperSonics 0, Portland Trail Blazers 2

1983 Western Conference First Round

1991

Portland Trail Blazers 3, Seattle SuperSonics 2

1991 Western Conference First Round

==== (4) Houston Rockets vs. (5) Utah Jazz ====
TNT

April 14
9:30pm (8:30 pm CDT)

Box score

Utah Jazz 90, Houston Rockets 122
Scoring by quarter: 24–31, 20–28, 27–24, 19–39
Pts: Rudy Gobert 22; Rebs: Rudy Gobert 12; Asts: Ricky Rubio 6	Pts: James Harden 29; Rebs: Clint Capela 12; Asts: James Harden 10
Houston leads series, 1–0

Toyota Center, Houston, Texas
Attendance: 18,055
Referees: Marc Davis, John Goble, Michael Smith

TNT

April 17
9:30pm (8:30 pm CDT)

Box score

Utah Jazz 98, Houston Rockets 118
Scoring by quarter: 19–39, 25–31, 23–25, 31–23
Pts: Rubio, O'Neale 17 each Rebs: Gobert, Favors 12 each Asts: Ricky Rubio 9	Pts: James Harden 32; Rebs: James Harden 13; Asts: James Harden 10
Houston leads series, 2–0

Toyota Center, Houston, Texas
Attendance: 18,055
Referees: Tony Brown, Zach Zarba, Tom Washington

ESPN

April 20
10:30pm (8:30 pm MDT)

Box score

Houston Rockets 104, Utah Jazz 101
Scoring by quarter: 28–30, 22–25, 24–21, 30–25
Pts: James Harden 22; Rebs: Clint Capela 14; Asts: James Harden 10	Pts: Donovan Mitchell 34; Rebs: Gobert, Ingles 8 each Asts: Ricky Rubio 6
Houston leads series, 3–0

Vivint Smart Home Arena, Salt Lake City, Utah
Attendance: 18,306
Referees: Ken Mauer, Josh Tiven, Kevin Scott

TNT

April 22
10:30pm (8:30 pm MDT)

Box score

Houston Rockets 91, Utah Jazz 107
Scoring by quarter: 24–32, 23–21, 32–23, 12–31
Pts: James Harden 30; Rebs: Chris Paul 8 Asts: Chris Paul 7	Pts: Donovan Mitchell 31; Rebs: Favors, O'Neale 11 each Asts: Ricky Rubio 11
Houston leads series, 3–1

Vivint Smart Home Arena, Salt Lake City, Utah
Attendance: 18,306
Referees: Tony Brothers, David Guthrie, Pat Fraher

TNT

April 24
8:00pm (7:00 pm CDT)

Box score

Utah Jazz 93, Houston Rockets 100
Scoring by quarter: 20–20, 22–26, 27–29, 24–25
Pts: Royce O'Neale 18; Rebs: Crowder, Gobert 10 each Asts: Ricky Rubio 11	Pts: James Harden 26; Rebs: Clint Capela 10; Asts: James Harden 6
Houston wins series, 4–1

Toyota Center, Houston, Texas
Attendance: 18,055
Referees: Ed Malloy, Sean Wright, Rodney Mott

Regular-season series
Series tied 2–2 in the regular-season series

October 24, 2018

Recap

Utah Jazz 100, Houston Rockets 89

Toyota Center, Houston, Texas

December 6, 2018

Recap

Houston Rockets 91, Utah Jazz 118

Vivint Smart Home Arena, Salt Lake City, Utah

December 17, 2018

Recap

Utah Jazz 97, Houston Rockets 102

Toyota Center, Houston, Texas

February 2, 2019

Recap

Houston Rockets 125, Utah Jazz 98

Vivint Smart Home Arena, Salt Lake City, Utah

This was the ninth playoff meeting between these two teams, with the Jazz winning five of the first eight meetings.

Previous playoffs series
Utah leads 5–3 in all-time playoff series

1985

Houston Rockets 2, Utah Jazz 3

1985 Western Conference First Round

1994

Houston Rockets 4, Utah Jazz 1

1994 Western Conference finals

1995

Houston Rockets 3, Utah Jazz 2

1995 Western Conference First Round

1997

Houston Rockets 2, Utah Jazz 4

1997 Western Conference finals

1998

Houston Rockets 2, Utah Jazz 3

1998 Western Conference First Round

2007

Utah Jazz 4, Houston Rockets 3

2007 Western Conference First Round

2008

Utah Jazz 4, Houston Rockets 2

2008 Western Conference First Round

2018

Houston Rockets 4, Utah Jazz 1

2018 Western Conference semifinals

== Conference semifinals ==
Note: Times are EDT (UTC−4) as listed by the NBA. If the venue is located in a different time zone, the local time is also given.

=== Eastern Conference semifinals ===
==== (1) Milwaukee Bucks vs. (4) Boston Celtics ====
ABC

April 28
1:00pm (12:00 pm CDT)

Box score

Boston Celtics 112, Milwaukee Bucks 90
Scoring by quarter: 26–17, 26–33, 36–21, 24–19
Pts: Kyrie Irving 26; Rebs: Al Horford 11; Asts: Kyrie Irving 11	Pts: Giannis Antetokounmpo 22; Rebs: Khris Middleton 10; Asts: Khris Middleton 6
Boston leads series, 1–0

Fiserv Forum, Milwaukee, Wisconsin
Attendance: 17,341
Referees: James Capers, Ed Malloy, Tyler Ford

TNT

April 30
8:00pm (7:00 pm CDT)

Box score

Boston Celtics 102, Milwaukee Bucks 123
Scoring by quarter: 30–25, 25–34, 18–39, 29–25
Pts: Marcus Morris 17; Rebs: Horford, Rozier 8 each Asts: Kyrie Irving 4	Pts: Giannis Antetokounmpo 29; Rebs: Pat Connaughton 11; Asts: Eric Bledsoe 5
Series tied, 1–1

Fiserv Forum, Milwaukee, Wisconsin
Attendance: 17,536
Referees: Marc Davis, Tony Brothers, Tom Washington

ESPN

May 3
8:00pm

Box score

Milwaukee Bucks 123, Boston Celtics 116
Scoring by quarter: 25–30, 30–26, 40–31, 28–29
Pts: Giannis Antetokounmpo 32; Rebs: Giannis Antetokounmpo 13; Asts: Giannis Antetokounmpo 8	Pts: Kyrie Irving 29; Rebs: Jayson Tatum 11; Asts: Kyrie Irving 6
Milwaukee leads series, 2–1

TD Garden, Boston, Massachusetts
Attendance: 18,624
Referees: Ken Mauer, Kane Fitzgerald, Tony Brown

TNT

May 6
7:00pm

Box score

Milwaukee Bucks 113, Boston Celtics 101
Scoring by quarter: 22–30, 25–19, 33–23, 33–29
Pts: Giannis Antetokounmpo 39; Rebs: Giannis Antetokounmpo 16; Asts: Khris Middleton 7	Pts: Kyrie Irving 23; Rebs: Marcus Morris 14; Asts: Kyrie Irving 10
Milwaukee leads series, 3–1

TD Garden, Boston, Massachusetts
Attendance: 18,624
Referees: Zach Zarba, John Goble, Pat Fraher

TNT

May 8
8:00pm (7:00 pm CDT)

Box score

Boston Celtics 91, Milwaukee Bucks 116
Scoring by quarter: 19–22, 20–30, 23–28, 29–36
Pts: Kyrie Irving 15; Rebs: Marcus Morris 11; Asts: Al Horford 6	Pts: Giannis Antetokounmpo 20; Rebs: Mirotić, Connaughton 11 each Asts: Giannis Antetokounmpo 8
Milwaukee wins series, 4–1

Fiserv Forum, Milwaukee, Wisconsin
Attendance: 17,701
Referees: Mike Callahan, David Guthrie, Rodney Mott

Regular-season series
Milwaukee won 2–1 in the regular-season series

November 1, 2018

Recap

Milwaukee Bucks 113, Boston Celtics 117

TD Garden, Boston, Massachusetts

December 21, 2018

Recap

Milwaukee Bucks 120, Boston Celtics 107

TD Garden, Boston, Massachusetts

February 21, 2019

Recap

Boston Celtics 97, Milwaukee Bucks 98

Fiserv Forum, Milwaukee, Wisconsin

This was the seventh playoff meeting between these two teams, with the Celtics winning five of the first six meetings.

Previous playoffs series
Boston leads 5–1 in all-time playoff series

1974

Milwaukee Bucks 3, Boston Celtics 4

1974 NBA Finals

1983

Boston Celtics 0, Milwaukee Bucks 4

1983 Eastern Conference semifinals

1984

Boston Celtics 4, Milwaukee Bucks 1

1984 Eastern Conference finals

1986

Boston Celtics 4, Milwaukee Bucks 0

1986 Eastern Conference finals

1987

Boston Celtics 4, Milwaukee Bucks 3

1987 Eastern Conference semifinals

2018

Boston Celtics 4, Milwaukee Bucks 3

2018 Eastern Conference First Round

- This is the most recent playoff series between the Celtics & Bucks until 2022.

==== (2) Toronto Raptors vs. (3) Philadelphia 76ers ====
TNT, SN1

April 27
7:30pm

Box score

Philadelphia 76ers 95, Toronto Raptors 108
Scoring by quarter: 31–39, 21–22, 29–31, 14–16
Pts: JJ Redick 17; Rebs: Tobias Harris 15; Asts: Tobias Harris 6	Pts: Kawhi Leonard 45; Rebs: Kawhi Leonard 11; Asts: Kyle Lowry 8
Toronto leads series, 1–0

Scotiabank Arena, Toronto, Ontario
Attendance: 19,800
Referees: Ken Mauer, Kane Fitzgerald, Nick Buchert

TNT, TSN

April 29
8:00pm

Box score

Philadelphia 76ers 94, Toronto Raptors 89
Scoring by quarter: 26–17, 25–21, 18–25, 25–26
Pts: Jimmy Butler 30; Rebs: Butler, Harris 11 each Asts: three players 5 each	Pts: Kawhi Leonard 35; Rebs: three players 7 each Asts: Kawhi Leonard 6
Series tied, 1–1

Scotiabank Arena, Toronto, Ontario
Attendance: 19,800
Referees: Mike Callahan, David Guthrie, Scott Wall

ESPN, SN1

May 2
8:00pm

Box score

Toronto Raptors 95, Philadelphia 76ers 116
Scoring by quarter: 29–32, 24–32, 28–25, 14–27
Pts: Kawhi Leonard 33; Rebs: Gasol, Green 6 each Asts: Kyle Lowry 5	Pts: Joel Embiid 33; Rebs: Joel Embiid 10; Asts: Jimmy Butler 9
Philadelphia leads series, 2–1

Wells Fargo Center, Philadelphia, Pennsylvania
Attendance: 20,658
Referees: Scott Foster, Jason Phillips, Tre Maddox

ABC, TSN/CTV

May 5
3:30pm

Box score

Toronto Raptors 101, Philadelphia 76ers 96
Scoring by quarter: 24–21, 23–24, 28–30, 26–21
Pts: Kawhi Leonard 39; Rebs: Kawhi Leonard 14; Asts: Kyle Lowry 7	Pts: Jimmy Butler 29; Rebs: Jimmy Butler 11; Asts: Joel Embiid 7
Series tied, 2–2

Wells Fargo Center, Philadelphia, Pennsylvania
Attendance: 20,639
Referees: Marc Davis, Tony Brothers, Josh Tiven

TNT, SN1

May 7
8:00pm

Box score

Philadelphia 76ers 89, Toronto Raptors 125
Scoring by quarter: 26–27, 17–37, 27–28, 19–33
Pts: Jimmy Butler 22; Rebs: Ben Simmons 7 Asts: Jimmy Butler 7	Pts: Pascal Siakam 25; Rebs: Kawhi Leonard 13; Asts: Kyle Lowry 5
Toronto leads series, 3–2

Scotiabank Arena, Toronto, Ontario
Attendance: 20,287
Referees: James Capers, Eric Lewis, Sean Wright

ESPN, TSN

May 9
8:00pm

Box score

Toronto Raptors 101, Philadelphia 76ers 112
Scoring by quarter: 21–29, 22–29, 24–29, 34–25
Pts: Kawhi Leonard 29; Rebs: Kawhi Leonard 12; Asts: Kyle Lowry 6	Pts: Jimmy Butler 25; Rebs: Joel Embiid 12; Asts: Jimmy Butler 8
Series tied, 3–3

Wells Fargo Center, Philadelphia, Pennsylvania
Attendance: 20,525
Referees: Zach Zarba, John Goble, Tom Washington

TNT, SN1

May 12
7:00pm

Box score

Philadelphia 76ers 90, Toronto Raptors 92
Scoring by quarter: 13–18, 27–26, 24–23, 26–25
Pts: Joel Embiid 21; Rebs: Joel Embiid 11; Asts: Ben Simmons 5	Pts: Kawhi Leonard 41; Rebs: Siakam, Gasol 11 each Asts: Kyle Lowry 6
Toronto wins series, 4–3

Scotiabank Arena, Toronto, Ontario
Attendance: 20,917
Referees: Scott Foster, Tony Brothers, Jason Phillips

As Game 7 came down to the final seconds, Joel Embiid cut a three-point Raptors lead to one with two free throws, then after Kawhi Leonard split his free throws, Jimmy Butler led the fast break and made a layup with 4.2 seconds left to tie the game. After a Toronto timeout, Leonard was given the ball, dribbled around the perimeter and shot it from the baseline, just inside the three-point arc. The shot bounced four times on the rim before going in to give the Raptors the series win. It was the first buzzer-beater to win a Game 7 in NBA history, and only the second such shot in a winner-take-all playoff game, after Michael Jordan's shot to win the Chicago Bulls' 1989 first-round series against the Cleveland Cavaliers. (In 1989, first-round playoff series were best-of-5 instead of the current best-of-7.)

Regular-season series
Toronto won 3–1 in the regular-season series

October 30, 2018

Recap

Philadelphia 76ers 112, Toronto Raptors 129

Scotiabank Arena, Toronto, Ontario

December 5, 2018

Recap

Philadelphia 76ers 102, Toronto Raptors 113

Scotiabank Arena, Toronto, Ontario

December 22, 2018

Recap

Toronto Raptors 101, Philadelphia 76ers 126

Wells Fargo Center, Philadelphia, Pennsylvania

February 5, 2019

Recap

Toronto Raptors 119, Philadelphia 76ers 107

Wells Fargo Center, Philadelphia, Pennsylvania

This was the second playoff meeting between these two teams, with Philadelphia winning the first meeting in the 2001 Eastern Conference semifinals.

Previous playoffs series
Philadelphia leads 1–0 in all-time playoff series

2001

Philadelphia 76ers 4, Toronto Raptors 3

2001 Eastern Conference semifinals

- This is the most recent playoff series between the 76ers & Raptors until 2022.

=== Western Conference semifinals ===
==== (1) Golden State Warriors vs. (4) Houston Rockets ====
ABC

April 28
3:30pm (12:30 pm PDT)

Box score

Houston Rockets 100, Golden State Warriors 104
Scoring by quarter: 19–28, 34–25, 23–30, 24–21
Pts: James Harden 35; Rebs: Clint Capela 6 Asts: James Harden 6	Pts: Kevin Durant 35; Rebs: Draymond Green 9 Asts: Draymond Green 9
Golden State leads series, 1–0

Oracle Arena, Oakland, California
Attendance: 19,596
Referees: Zach Zarba, Josh Tiven, Courtney Kirkland

TNT

April 30
10:30pm (7:30 pm PDT)

Box score

Houston Rockets 109, Golden State Warriors 115
Scoring by quarter: 20–29, 29–29, 26–24, 34–33
Pts: James Harden 29; Rebs: Tucker, Capela 10 each Asts: Chris Paul 6	Pts: Kevin Durant 29; Rebs: Draymond Green 12; Asts: Draymond Green 7
Golden State leads series, 2–0

Oracle Arena, Oakland, California
Attendance: 19,596
Referees: Scott Foster, Ed Malloy, Eric Lewis

ABC

May 4
8:30pm (7:30 pm CDT)

Box score

Golden State Warriors 121, Houston Rockets 126 (OT)
Scoring by quarter: 26–25, 23–33, 35–33, 28–21, Overtime: 9–14
Pts: Kevin Durant 46; Rebs: Draymond Green 11; Asts: Draymond Green 10	Pts: James Harden 41; Rebs: P. J. Tucker 12; Asts: Chris Paul 7
Golden State leads series, 2–1

Toyota Center, Houston, Texas
Attendance: 18,169
Referees: James Capers, John Goble, Sean Wright

TNT

May 6
9:30pm (8:30 pm CDT)

Box score

Golden State Warriors 108, Houston Rockets 112
Scoring by quarter: 28–25, 26–36, 30–32, 24–19
Pts: Kevin Durant 34; Rebs: Draymond Green 10; Asts: Stephen Curry 8	Pts: James Harden 38; Rebs: Harden, Tucker 10 each Asts: Chris Paul 5
Series tied, 2–2

Toyota Center, Houston, Texas
Attendance: 18,055
Referees: Mike Callahan, David Guthrie, Kevin Scott

TNT

May 8
10:30pm (7:30 pm PDT)

Box score

Houston Rockets 99, Golden State Warriors 104
Scoring by quarter: 17–31, 26–26, 29–15, 27–32
Pts: James Harden 31; Rebs: Clint Capela 14; Asts: James Harden 8	Pts: Klay Thompson 27; Rebs: Draymond Green 12; Asts: Draymond Green 11
Golden State leads series, 3–2

Oracle Arena, Oakland, California
Attendance: 19,596
Referees: Ken Mauer, Jason Phillips, Kane Fitzgerald

ESPN

May 10
9:00pm (8:00 pm CDT)

Box score

Golden State Warriors 118, Houston Rockets 113
Scoring by quarter: 27–28, 30–29, 25–30, 36–26
Pts: Stephen Curry 33; Rebs: Draymond Green 10; Asts: Draymond Green 7	Pts: James Harden 35; Rebs: Chris Paul 11; Asts: Chris Paul 6
Golden State wins series, 4–2

Toyota Center, Houston, Texas
Attendance: 18,055
Referees: Marc Davis, Eric Lewis, Pat Fraher

All 6 games in the series finished with a differential of less than or exactly 6 points, making it the first playoff series in NBA history to accomplish this feat.

Regular-season series
Houston won 3–1 in the regular-season series

November 15, 2018

Recap

Golden State Warriors 86, Houston Rockets 107

Toyota Center, Houston, Texas

January 3, 2019

Recap

Houston Rockets 135, Golden State Warriors 134

Oracle Arena, Oakland, California

February 23, 2019

Recap

Houston Rockets 118, Golden State Warriors 112

Oracle Arena, Oakland, California

March 13, 2019

Recap

Golden State Warriors 106, Houston Rockets 104

Toyota Center, Houston, Texas

This was the fourth playoff meeting between these two teams, with Golden State winning the previous three meetings.

Previous playoffs series
Golden State leads 3–0 in all-time playoff series

2015

Golden State Warriors 4, Houston Rockets 1

2015 Western Conference finals

2016

Golden State Warriors 4, Houston Rockets 1

2016 Western Conference First Round

2018

Houston Rockets 3, Golden State Warriors 4

2018 Western Conference finals

- This is the most recent playoff series between the Warriors & Rockets until 2025.

==== (2) Denver Nuggets vs. (3) Portland Trail Blazers ====
TNT

April 29
10:30pm (8:30pm MDT)

Box score

Portland Trail Blazers 113, Denver Nuggets 121
Scoring by quarter: 32–32, 23–26, 29–35, 29–28
Pts: Damian Lillard 39; Rebs: Aminu, Turner 8 each Asts: Damian Lillard 6	Pts: Nikola Jokić 37; Rebs: Nikola Jokić 9 Asts: Jamal Murray 8
Denver leads series, 1–0

Pepsi Center, Denver, Colorado
Attendance: 19,520
Referees: Ken Mauer, Sean Wright, Ben Taylor

TNT

May 1
9:00pm (7:00pm MDT)

Box score

Portland Trail Blazers 97, Denver Nuggets 90
Scoring by quarter: 28–23, 22–12, 28–29, 19–26
Pts: CJ McCollum 20; Rebs: Al-Farouq Aminu 10; Asts: CJ McCollum 6	Pts: Nikola Jokić 16; Rebs: Nikola Jokić 14; Asts: Nikola Jokić 7
Series tied, 1–1

Pepsi Center, Denver, Colorado
Attendance: 19,520
Referees: James Capers, Pat Fraher, Michael Smith

ESPN

May 3
10:30pm (7:30pm PDT)

Box score

Denver Nuggets 137, Portland Trail Blazers 140 (4OT)
Scoring by quarter: 17–23, 30–25, 29–33, 26–21, Overtime: 7–7, 9–9, 11–11, 8–11
Pts: Jamal Murray 34; Rebs: Nikola Jokić 18; Asts: Nikola Jokić 14	Pts: CJ McCollum 41; Rebs: Enes Kanter 15; Asts: Damian Lillard 8
Portland leads series, 2–1

Moda Center, Portland, Oregon
Attendance: 20,193
Referees: Mike Callahan, Eric Lewis, Rodney Mott

TNT

May 5
7:00pm (4:00pm PDT)

Box score

Denver Nuggets 116, Portland Trail Blazers 112
Scoring by quarter: 29–33, 28–30, 27–14, 32–35
Pts: Jamal Murray 34; Rebs: Nikola Jokić 12; Asts: Nikola Jokić 11	Pts: CJ McCollum 29; Rebs: Enes Kanter 10; Asts: Damian Lillard 7
Series tied, 2–2

Moda Center, Portland, Oregon
Attendance: 20,146
Referees: Scott Foster, Jason Phillips, Derrick Collins

TNT

May 7
10:30pm (8:30pm MDT)

Box score

Portland Trail Blazers 98, Denver Nuggets 124
Scoring by quarter: 25–31, 22–34, 18–28, 33–31
Pts: Damian Lillard 22; Rebs: Enes Kanter 8 Asts: Damian Lillard 4	Pts: Nikola Jokić 25; Rebs: Nikola Jokić 19; Asts: Jamal Murray 9
Denver leads series, 3–2

Pepsi Center, Denver, Colorado
Attendance: 19,520
Referees: Marc Davis, Tony Brothers, Josh Tiven

ESPN

May 9
10:30pm (7:30pm PDT)

Box score

Denver Nuggets 108, Portland Trail Blazers 119
Scoring by quarter: 34–26, 20–32, 26–29, 28–32
Pts: Nikola Jokić 29; Rebs: Nikola Jokić 12; Asts: Nikola Jokić 8	Pts: Damian Lillard 32; Rebs: Enes Kanter 14; Asts: Evan Turner 7
Series tied, 3–3

Moda Center, Portland, Oregon
Attendance: 20,022
Referees: James Capers, Ed Malloy, Sean Wright

ABC

May 12
3:30pm (1:30pm MDT)

Box score

Portland Trail Blazers 100, Denver Nuggets 96
Scoring by quarter: 17–29, 22–19, 32–24, 29–24
Pts: CJ McCollum 37; Rebs: Enes Kanter 13; Asts: Damian Lillard 8	Pts: Nikola Jokić 29; Rebs: Nikola Jokić 13; Asts: Jamal Murray 5
Portland wins series, 4–3

Pepsi Center, Denver, Colorado
Attendance: 19,725
Referees: Mike Callahan, John Goble, David Guthrie

Game three became the second playoff game in NBA history to go into quadruple-overtime, joining a 1953 game between the Boston Celtics and Syracuse Nationals.

Regular-season series
Denver won 3–1 in the regular-season series

November 30, 2018

Recap

Denver Nuggets 113, Portland Trail Blazers 112

Moda Center, Portland, Oregon

January 13, 2019

Recap

Portland Trail Blazers 113, Denver Nuggets 116

Pepsi Center, Denver, Colorado

April 5, 2019

Recap

Portland Trail Blazers 110, Denver Nuggets 119

Pepsi Center, Denver, Colorado

April 7, 2019

Recap

Denver Nuggets 108, Portland Trail Blazers 115

Moda Center, Portland, Oregon

This was the third playoff meeting between these two teams, with each team winning one series.

Previous playoffs series
Series tied 1–1 in all-time playoff series

1977

Denver Nuggets 2, Portland Trail Blazers 4

1977 Western Conference semifinals

1986

Denver Nuggets 3, Portland Trail Blazers 1

1986 Western Conference First Round

== Conference finals ==
Note: Times are EDT (UTC−4) as listed by the NBA. If the venue is located in a different time zone, the local time is also given.

=== Eastern Conference finals ===
==== (1) Milwaukee Bucks vs. (2) Toronto Raptors ====
TNT, SN1

May 15
8:30pm (7:30 pm CDT)

Box score

Toronto Raptors 100, Milwaukee Bucks 108
Scoring by quarter: 34–23, 25–28, 24–25, 17–32
Pts: Kawhi Leonard 31; Rebs: Marc Gasol 12; Asts: Marc Gasol 5	Pts: Brook Lopez 29; Rebs: Giannis Antetokounmpo 14; Asts: Giannis Antetokounmpo 6
Milwaukee leads series, 1–0

Fiserv Forum, Milwaukee, Wisconsin
Attendance: 17,345
Referees: Zach Zarba, John Goble, Sean Wright

TNT, TSN

May 17
8:30pm (7:30 pm CDT)

Box score

Toronto Raptors 103, Milwaukee Bucks 125
Scoring by quarter: 21–35, 18–29, 39–31, 25–30
Pts: Kawhi Leonard 31; Rebs: Serge Ibaka 10; Asts: Kyle Lowry 4	Pts: Giannis Antetokounmpo 30; Rebs: Giannis Antetokounmpo 17; Asts: Eric Bledsoe 7
Milwaukee leads series, 2–0

Fiserv Forum, Milwaukee, Wisconsin
Attendance: 17,570
Referees: Mike Callahan, Eric Lewis, Rodney Mott

TNT, SN1

May 19
7:00pm

Box score

Milwaukee Bucks 112, Toronto Raptors 118 (2OT)
Scoring by quarter: 21–30, 30–28, 24–19, 21–19, Overtime: 7–7, 9–15
Pts: George Hill 24; Rebs: Giannis Antetokounmpo 23; Asts: Giannis Antetokounmpo 7	Pts: Kawhi Leonard 36; Rebs: Marc Gasol 12; Asts: Marc Gasol 7
Milwaukee leads series, 2–1

Scotiabank Arena, Toronto, Ontario
Attendance: 19,923
Referees: Scott Foster, Ed Malloy, Tom Washington

TNT, TSN

May 21
8:30pm

Box score

Milwaukee Bucks 102, Toronto Raptors 120
Scoring by quarter: 31–32, 24–33, 26–29, 21–26
Pts: Khris Middleton 30; Rebs: Giannis Antetokounmpo 10; Asts: Khris Middleton 7	Pts: Kyle Lowry 25; Rebs: Serge Ibaka 13; Asts: Marc Gasol 7
Series tied, 2–2

Scotiabank Arena, Toronto, Ontario
Attendance: 20,237
Referees: James Capers, Ken Mauer, Kane Fitzgerald

TNT, TSN

May 23
8:30pm (7:30 pm CDT)

Box score

Toronto Raptors 105, Milwaukee Bucks 99
Scoring by quarter: 22–32, 24–17, 26–26, 33–24
Pts: Kawhi Leonard 35; Rebs: Pascal Siakam 13; Asts: Kawhi Leonard 9	Pts: Giannis Antetokounmpo 24; Rebs: Malcolm Brogdon 11; Asts: Khris Middleton 10
Toronto leads series, 3–2

Fiserv Forum, Milwaukee, Wisconsin
Attendance: 17,384
Referees: Marc Davis, Tony Brothers, Pat Fraher

TNT, SN1

May 25
8:30pm

Box score

Milwaukee Bucks 94, Toronto Raptors 100
Scoring by quarter: 31–18, 19–25, 26–28, 18–29
Pts: Giannis Antetokounmpo 21; Rebs: Giannis Antetokounmpo 11; Asts: Eric Bledsoe 7	Pts: Kawhi Leonard 27; Rebs: Kawhi Leonard 17; Asts: Kyle Lowry 8
Toronto wins series, 4–2

Scotiabank Arena, Toronto, Ontario
Attendance: 20,478
Referees: Mike Callahan, David Guthrie, Eric Lewis

Regular-season series
Milwaukee won 3–1 in the regular-season series

October 29, 2018

Recap

Toronto Raptors 109, Milwaukee Bucks 124

Fiserv Forum, Milwaukee, Wisconsin

December 9, 2018

Recap

Milwaukee Bucks 104, Toronto Raptors 99

Scotiabank Arena, Toronto, Ontario

January 5, 2019

Recap

Toronto Raptors 123, Milwaukee Bucks 116

Fiserv Forum, Milwaukee, Wisconsin

January 31, 2019

Recap

Milwaukee Bucks 105, Toronto Raptors 92

Scotiabank Arena, Toronto, Ontario

This was the first Eastern Conference finals game since 2014 that Cleveland Cavaliers were not played and for first time since 2010 that LeBron James was not playing in Eastern Conference finals. This was the second playoff meeting between these two teams, with the Raptors winning the first meeting in 2017.

Previous playoffs series
Toronto leads 1–0 in all-time playoff series

2017

Toronto Raptors 4, Milwaukee Bucks 2

2017 Eastern Conference First Round

=== Western Conference finals ===
==== (1) Golden State Warriors vs. (3) Portland Trail Blazers ====
ESPN

May 14
9:00pm (6:00 pm PDT)

Box score

Portland Trail Blazers 94, Golden State Warriors 116
Scoring by quarter: 23–27, 22–27, 26–23, 23–39
Pts: Damian Lillard 19; Rebs: Enes Kanter 16; Asts: Damian Lillard 6	Pts: Stephen Curry 36; Rebs: Draymond Green 10; Asts: Stephen Curry 7
Golden State leads series, 1–0

Oracle Arena, Oakland, California
Attendance: 19,596
Referees: Marc Davis, Tony Brothers, Tony Brown

ESPN

May 16
9:00pm (6:00 pm PDT)

Box score

Portland Trail Blazers 111, Golden State Warriors 114
Scoring by quarter: 31–29, 34–21, 24–39, 22–25
Pts: Damian Lillard 23; Rebs: Aminu, Leonard 6 each Asts: Damian Lillard 10	Pts: Stephen Curry 37; Rebs: Draymond Green 10; Asts: Stephen Curry 8
Golden State leads series, 2–0

Oracle Arena, Oakland, California
Attendance: 19,596
Referees: James Capers, Ken Mauer, Josh Tiven

ESPN

May 18
9:00pm (6:00 pm PDT)

Box score

Golden State Warriors 110, Portland Trail Blazers 99
Scoring by quarter: 27–29, 26–37, 29–13, 28–20
Pts: Stephen Curry 36; Rebs: Draymond Green 13; Asts: Draymond Green 12	Pts: CJ McCollum 23; Rebs: Zach Collins 8 Asts: Damian Lillard 6
Golden State leads series, 3–0

Moda Center, Portland, Oregon
Attendance: 20,214
Referees: Zach Zarba, David Guthrie, Pat Fraher

ESPN

May 20
9:00pm (6:00 pm PDT)

Box score

Golden State Warriors 119, Portland Trail Blazers 117 (OT)
Scoring by quarter: 36–35, 29–34, 22–26, 24–16, Overtime: 8–6
Pts: Stephen Curry 37; Rebs: Green, Looney 14 each Asts: Curry, Green 11 each	Pts: Meyers Leonard 30; Rebs: Meyers Leonard 12; Asts: Damian Lillard 12
Golden State wins series, 4–0

Moda Center, Portland, Oregon
Attendance: 20,064
Referees: Mike Callahan, Jason Phillips, Kevin Scott

Regular-season series
Series tied 2–2 in the regular-season series

November 23, 2018

Recap

Portland Trail Blazers 97, Golden State Warriors 125

Oracle Arena, Oakland, California

December 27, 2018

Recap

Portland Trail Blazers 110, Golden State Warriors 109 (OT)

Oracle Arena, Oakland, California

December 29, 2018

Recap

Golden State Warriors 115, Portland Trail Blazers 110

Moda Center, Portland, Oregon

February 13, 2019

Recap

Golden State Warriors 107, Portland Trail Blazers 129

Moda Center, Portland, Oregon

This was the third playoff meeting between these two teams, with Golden State winning the first two meetings.

Previous playoffs series
Golden State leads 2–0 in all-time playoff series

2016

Golden State Warriors 4, Portland Trail Blazers 1

2016 Western Conference semifinals

2017

Golden State Warriors 4, Portland Trail Blazers 0

2017 Western Conference First Round

== NBA Finals: (E2) Toronto Raptors vs. (W1) Golden State Warriors ==
Note: Times are EDT (UTC−4) as listed by the NBA. If the venue is located in a different time zone, the local time is also given.

ABC, SN1

May 30
9:00pm

Box score

Golden State Warriors 109, Toronto Raptors 118
Scoring by quarter: 21–25, 28–34, 32–29, 28–30
Pts: Stephen Curry 34; Rebs: Draymond Green 10; Asts: Draymond Green 10	Pts: Pascal Siakam 32; Rebs: Leonard, Siakam 8 each Asts: Kyle Lowry 9
Toronto leads series, 1–0

Scotiabank Arena, Toronto, Ontario
Attendance: 19,983
Referees: James Capers, Jason Phillips, John Goble, (Alternate) Josh Tiven

ABC, TSN

June 2
8:00pm

Box score

Golden State Warriors 109, Toronto Raptors 104
Scoring by quarter: 26–27, 28–32, 34–21, 21–24
Pts: Klay Thompson 25; Rebs: Cousins, Green 10 each Asts: Draymond Green 9	Pts: Kawhi Leonard 34; Rebs: Kawhi Leonard 14; Asts: Pascal Siakam 4
Series tied, 1–1

Scotiabank Arena, Toronto, Ontario
Attendance: 20,014
Referees: Scott Foster, Tony Brothers, Ed Malloy, (Alternate) Josh Tiven

ABC, SN1

June 5
9:00pm (6:00 pm PDT)

Box score

Toronto Raptors 123, Golden State Warriors 109
Scoring by quarter: 36–29, 24–23, 36–31, 27–26
Pts: Kawhi Leonard 30; Rebs: Pascal Siakam 9 Asts: Kyle Lowry 9	Pts: Stephen Curry 47; Rebs: Stephen Curry 8 Asts: Stephen Curry 7
Toronto leads series, 2–1

Oracle Arena, Oakland, California
Attendance: 19,596
Referees: Marc Davis, David Guthrie, Kane Fitzgerald, (Alternate) Sean Wright

ABC, TSN

June 7
9:00pm (6:00 pm PDT)

Box score

Toronto Raptors 105, Golden State Warriors 92
Scoring by quarter: 17–23, 25–23, 37–21, 26–25
Pts: Kawhi Leonard 36; Rebs: Kawhi Leonard 12; Asts: Kyle Lowry 7	Pts: Klay Thompson 28; Rebs: Draymond Green 9 Asts: Draymond Green 12
Toronto leads series, 3–1

Oracle Arena, Oakland, California
Attendance: 19,596
Referees: Mike Callahan, Zach Zarba, Eric Lewis, (Alternate) Sean Wright

ABC, SN1

June 10
9:00pm

Box score

Golden State Warriors 106, Toronto Raptors 105
Scoring by quarter: 34–28, 28–28, 22–22, 22–27
Pts: Stephen Curry 31; Rebs: Draymond Green 10; Asts: Draymond Green 8	Pts: Kawhi Leonard 26; Rebs: Kawhi Leonard 12; Asts: Leonard, Lowry 6 each
Toronto leads series, 3–2

Scotiabank Arena, Toronto, Ontario
Attendance: 20,144
Referees: James Capers, Jason Phillips, Ed Malloy, (Alternate) Kane Fitzgerald

ABC, TSN

June 13
9:00pm (6:00 pm PDT)

Box score

Toronto Raptors 114, Golden State Warriors 110
Scoring by quarter: 33–32, 27–25, 26–31, 28–22
Pts: Lowry, Siakam 26 each Rebs: Pascal Siakam 10; Asts: Kyle Lowry 10	Pts: Klay Thompson 30; Rebs: Draymond Green 19; Asts: Draymond Green 13
Toronto wins series, 4–2

Oracle Arena, Oakland, California
Attendance: 19,596
Referees: Marc Davis, David Guthrie, John Goble, (Alternate) Eric Lewis

Regular-season series
Toronto won 2–0 in the regular-season series

November 29, 2018

Recap

Golden State Warriors 128, Toronto Raptors 131 (OT)

Scotiabank Arena, Toronto, Ontario

December 12, 2018

Recap

Toronto Raptors 113, Golden State Warriors 93

Oracle Arena, Oakland, California

This was the first NBA finals game since 2014 that Cleveland Cavaliers were not played and for first time since 2010 that LeBron James was not playing in NBA finals. This was the first meeting in the NBA Finals between these two teams.

== Statistical leaders ==
Category	Game high			Average			
Category	Player	Team	High	Player	Team	Avg.	GP
Points	Damian Lillard; Kevin Durant	Portland Trail Blazers; Golden State Warriors	50	Kevin Durant	Golden State Warriors	32.3	12
Rebounds	Giannis Antetokounmpo	Milwaukee Bucks	23	Nikola Jokić; Andre Drummond	Denver Nuggets; Detroit Pistons	13.0	14; 4
Assists	Nikola Jokić; Russell Westbrook	Denver Nuggets; Oklahoma City Thunder	14	Russell Westbrook	Oklahoma City Thunder	10.6	5
Steals	James Harden	Houston Rockets	6	Thaddeus Young	Indiana Pacers	2.8	4
Blocks	Rudy Gobert	Utah Jazz	7	Rudy Gobert	Utah Jazz	2.6	5

== Media coverage ==
=== Television ===
ESPN, TNT, ABC, and NBA TV broadcast the playoffs nationally in the United States. During the first two rounds, games were split between TNT, ESPN, and ABC regardless of conference. TNT primarily aired games on Saturday through Wednesday, while ESPN on Friday and Saturday. For Thursday games, TNT had them in the first round and ESPN in the second round. ABC then aired selected first and second-round games on Friday through Sunday. NBA TV also televised selected games in the first round on Tuesday through Thursday. Also in the first round, regional sports networks affiliated with the teams could also broadcast the games, except for weekend games televised on ABC. (Note: Game 3 of the Celtics–Pacers first round series aired nationally on ABC and co-existed with the teams' respective regional sports networks.) The Western Conference finals were televised on ESPN, while TNT televised the Eastern Conference finals. ABC had exclusive television rights to the 2019 NBA Finals, which was the 17th consecutive year for the network.

In Canada, the home market of the Toronto Raptors, national broadcast rights were split approximately equally between the Sportsnet and TSN groups of channels, with some conflicting non-Raptors games airing on NBA TV Canada. Separate Canadian broadcasts were produced for all games involving the Raptors regardless of round or U.S. broadcaster. One TSN telecast of a conference semifinal game involving the Raptors was simulcast over the co-owned CTV broadcast network. For the NBA Finals, in addition to the Canadian cable telecasts, most games also aired on either Citytv, CTV, or CTV 2 (broadcast networks co-owned with Sportsnet and TSN respectively), using the ABC feed for simultaneous substitution purposes.
