= European Under-18 All-Star Game 2009 =

Blue Team	White Team
77	75
- Date: September 18, 2009
- Venue: Spodek, Katowice
- MVP: (Lithuania) Jonas Valančiūnas
- Attendance: ?

European Under-18 All-Star Game 2009 was held on September 18, 2009 in Spodek Arena. Blue Team played against White Team. Both teams consisted of the best European players, which has not more than 18 years.

== Rosters ==
Blue Team
No.	Player	Position	Height
4.	(Italy) Andrea De Nicolao	PG	1.87 m.
5.	(Lithuania) Augustas Pečiukevičius	PG/SG	1.90 m.
6.	(Serbia) Nemanja Nedović	PG/SG	1.87 m.
7.	(Poland) S. Szymanski	SG	1.86 m.
8.	(Serbia) Lazar Radosavljević	SF	2.03 m.
9.	(Greece) L. Chrysikopoulos	SF	2.03 m.
10.	(Slovenia) Edo Murić	PF	2.02 m.
11.	(Russia) P. Antipov	PF	2.00 m.
12.	(Montenegro) Nemanja Radović	PF/C	2.06 m.
14.	(Lithuania) Jonas Valančiūnas	C	2.11 m.
15.	(Latvia) Mārtiņš Meiers	C	2.06 m.

White Team
No.	Player	Position	Height
4.	(Croatia) Toni Prostran	PG	1.85 m.
5.	(Sweden) A. Person	PG	1.87 m.
6.	(Serbia) Danilo Anđušić	SG	1.95 m.
7.	(Bulgaria) E. Binev	SF	1.98 m.
8.	(Sweden) C. Czerapowicz	SF	1.97 m.
9.	(Lithuania) Saulius Kulvietis	SF/PF	1.99 m.
10.	(Hungary) J. Eilingsfeld	PF	1.98 m.
11.	(Serbia) Branislav Đekić	PF	2.05 m.
14.	(Germany) P. Neumann	C	2.10 m.
15.	(Serbia) Dejan Musli	C	2.13 m.

== Coaches ==
The Blue Team coaches was Damian Jennings ( (Wales) ) and Sven Van Camp ( (Belgium) ), the White Team coaches was Jyri Lohikoski ( (Finland) ) and Željko Đokić ( (Serbia) ).

== See also ==
- EuroBasket 2009
