= ABQ Uptown =

Coordinates: 35.103°N 106.567°W

ABQ Uptown Shopping Center
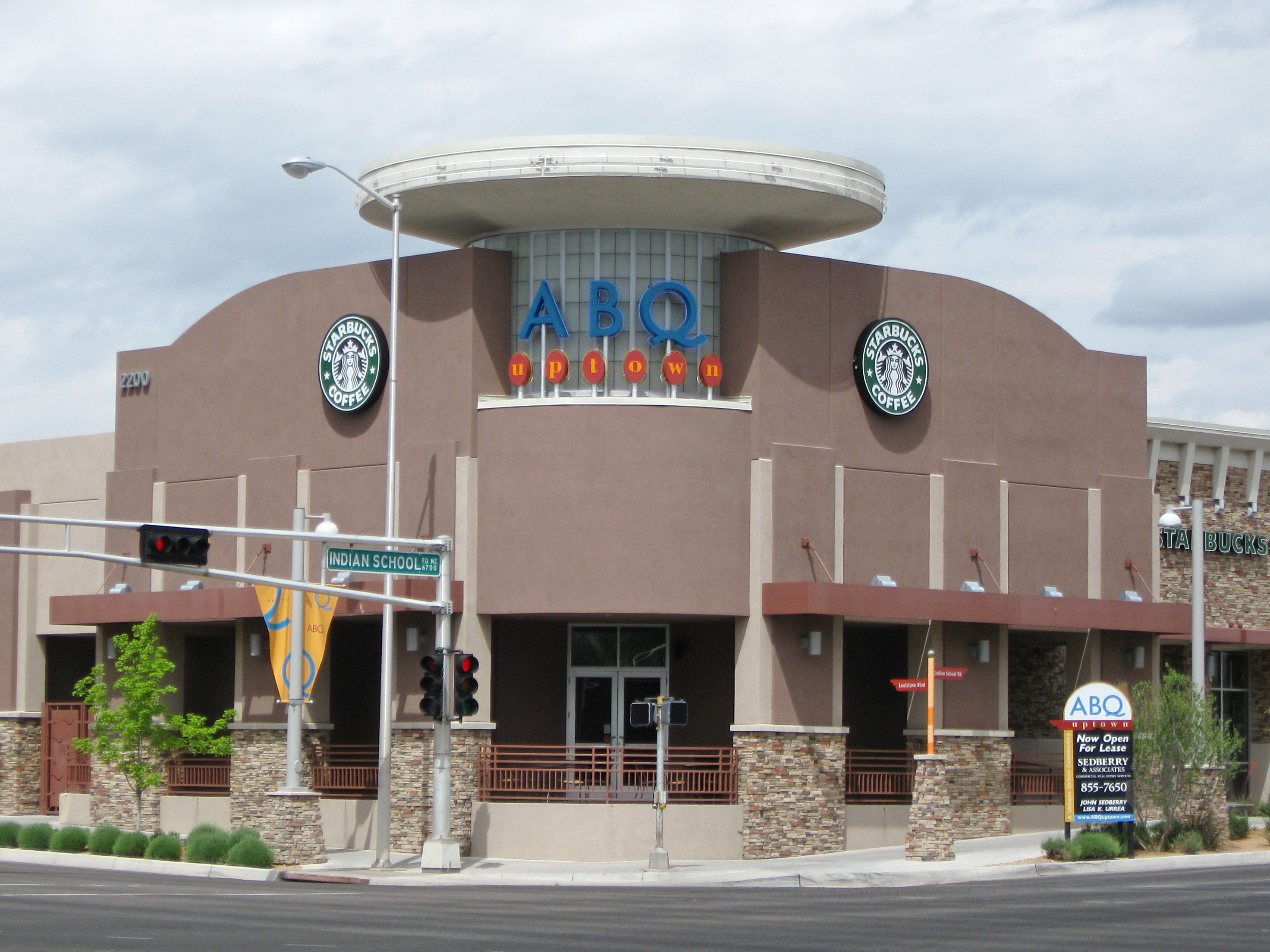
- Southwest Corner
- Location: Albuquerque, New Mexico, United States
- Opened: November 2006
- Developer: Hunt Development Group
- Manager: Simon Property Group
- Owner: Simon Property Group
- Architect: Dekker/Perich/Sabatini
- Num. of stores: 48
- Num. of anchor tenants: 3
- Floor area: 230,026 square feet (21,370.1 m^{2})
- Floors: 2 (Toni and Guy and The Melting Pot) 1 (other stores)
- Parking: 750 spaces
- Website: simon.com/mall/abq-uptown

ABQ Uptown is an outdoor shopping mall owned by Simon Property Group in Albuquerque, New Mexico, one of four malls located in the Albuquerque area . Anchor tenants include Pottery Barn, The North Face, and Lush, as well as the only Apple Store in New Mexico. The outdoor environment of this mall includes music, lights and seasonal decorations.

== Background ==
ABQ Uptown opened in 2006 as an open air "lifestyle center". It was developed by Hunt Development Group and designed by Dekker/Perich/Sabatini.

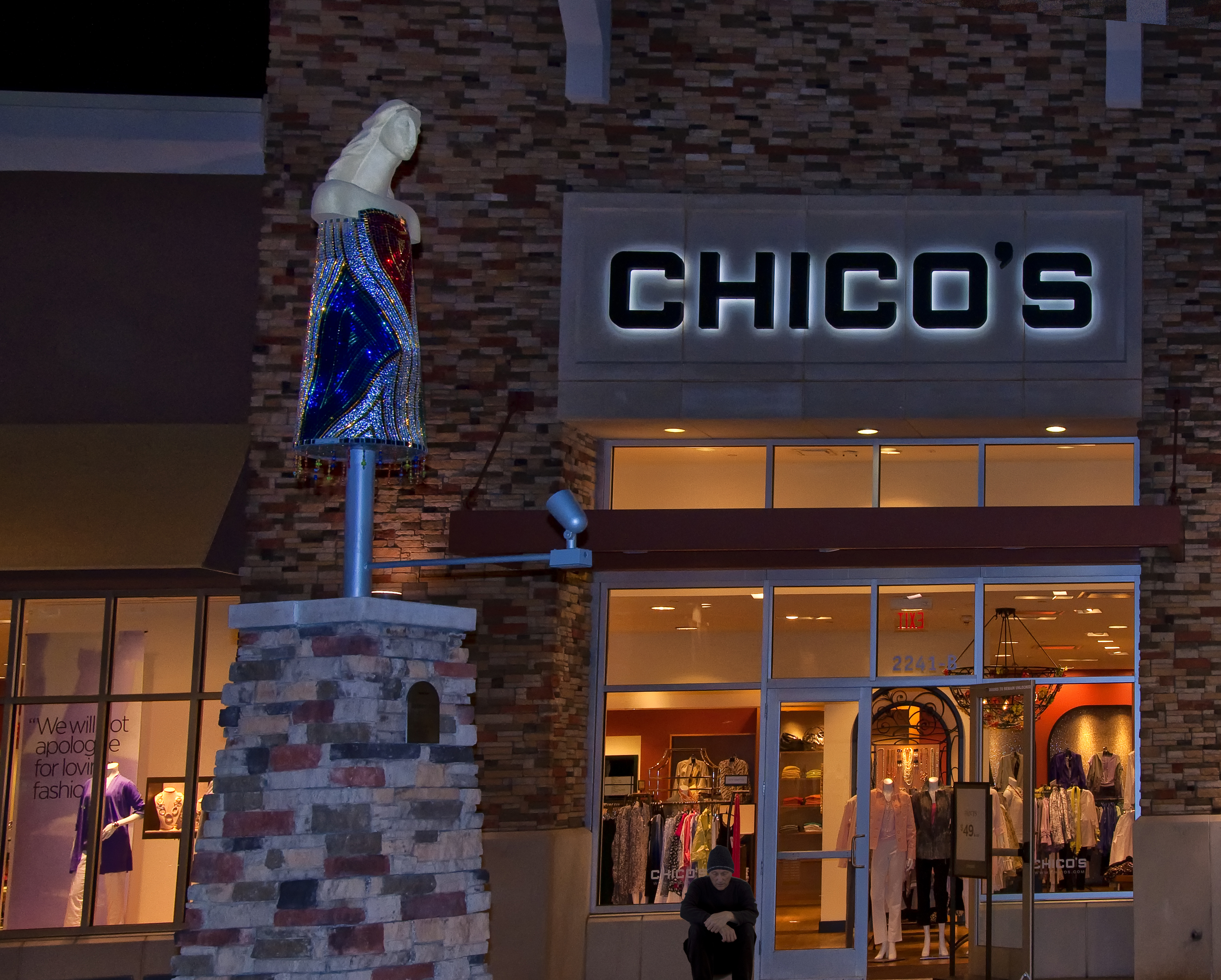
A Storefront and a statue

=== History ===
The brownfield site was a vacant 20 acre lot between Coronado and Winrock Malls, originally the site of St. Pius X High School. The school was razed in the late 1980s to make room for an ambitious mixed-use development called The Commons, which would have included two 22-story office towers and a 14-story hotel. However, this project fell apart and the land remained vacant. Below the infill site, a three level, 300 space parking garage was built to facilitate extra parking.

=== Today ===
ABQ Uptown opened in two phases. Phase one opened in November 2006, and included the shopping centers, parking garage, and the realignment of roads and utilities in the area. Phase two was the development and construction of housing, and opened in 2008. Simon Property Group, who used to own Cottonwood Mall (the fourth mall in the metropolitan area, and the only one not in the uptown area), purchased ABQ Uptown from Hunt Building Corporation in 2012. The businesses currently hosted include Anthropologie, Apple, AT&T, Banana Republic, Eddie Bauer, GAP, Lucky Brand Jeans, Lululemon Athletica, Lush, MAC Cosmetics, Michael Kors, Pottery Barn, Soma, Starbucks, Sunglass Hut, The North Face, T-Mobile, White House Black Market, and Williams Sonoma.

=== Apartments ===
Apartments were added across the street from the ABQ Uptown shopping center. The 198-unit building opened in 2008.
