= 2019–20 Washington Wizards season =

Season of National Basketball Association team the Washington Wizards

- Head coach: Scott Brooks
- General manager: Tommy Sheppard
- Owners: Ted Leonsis
- Arena: Capital One Arena

Results
- Record: 25–47 (.347)
- Place: Division: 3rd (Southeast); Conference: 9th (Eastern)
- Playoff finish: Did not qualify
- Stats at Basketball Reference

Local media
- Television: NBC Sports Washington; NBC 4
- Radio: Federal News Radio; 106.7 The Fan

The 2019–20 Washington Wizards season was the 59th season of the franchise in the National Basketball Association (NBA) and 47th in the Washington, D.C. area. The Wizards made front office changes, most notably firing former general manager Ernie Grunfeld late last season, replacing him with his longtime assistant, Tommy Sheppard.

The season was suspended by the league officials following the games of March 11 after it was reported that Rudy Gobert tested positive for COVID-19.

On June 4, the Wizards were one of 22 teams invited to the NBA Bubble.

== Draft picks ==
Round	Pick	Player	Position	Nationality	College
1	9	Rui Hachimura	PF	Japan	Gonzaga

With their sole natural selection of the draft in the first round, the Wizards selected Japanese born power forward Rui Hachimura from Gonzaga University. The team later acquired the rights to the Philadelphia 76ers 42nd pick, small forward Admiral Schofield, in a trade.

== Roster ==
2019–20 Washington Wizards roster
Players

Pos.	No.	Player	Height	Weight	DOB	From
G	3	Bradley Beal	6 ft 3 in (1.91 m)	207 lb (94 kg)	1993–06–28	Florida
F	42	Dāvis Bertāns	6 ft 10 in (2.08 m)	225 lb (102 kg)	1992–11–12	Latvia
G	17	Isaac Bonga	6 ft 8 in (2.03 m)	180 lb (82 kg)	1999–11–08	Germany
G/F	6	Troy Brown	6 ft 6 in (1.98 m)	215 lb (98 kg)	1999–07–28	Oregon
F/C	13	Thomas Bryant	6 ft 10 in (2.08 m)	248 lb (112 kg)	1997–07–31	Indiana
G	22	Jerian Grant	6 ft 4 in (1.93 m)	198 lb (90 kg)	1997–07–31	Notre Dame
F	8	Rui Hachimura	6 ft 8 in (2.03 m)	230 lb (104 kg)	1998–02–08	Gonzaga
C	28	Ian Mahinmi	6 ft 11 in (2.11 m)	262 lb (119 kg)	1986–11–05	France
G	24	Garrison Mathews (TW)	6 ft 5 in (1.96 m)	215 lb (98 kg)	1996–10–24	Lipscomb
G	5	Shabazz Napier	6 ft 0 in (1.83 m)	175 lb (79 kg)	1991–07–14	Connecticut
F/C	18	Anžejs Pasečņiks	7 ft 2 in (2.18 m)	229 lb (104 kg)	1995–12–20	Latvia
G	20	Gary Payton	6 ft 3 in (1.91 m)	195 lb (88 kg)	1992–12–01	Oregon State
G	12	Jerome Robinson	6 ft 4 in (1.93 m)	190 lb (86 kg)	1997–02–22	Boston College
G/F	1	Admiral Schofield	6 ft 5 in (1.96 m)	241 lb (109 kg)	1997–03–30	Tennessee
G	14	Ish Smith	6 ft 0 in (1.83 m)	175 lb (79 kg)	1988–07–05	Wake Forest
F	7	Jarrod Uthoff	6 ft 9 in (2.06 m)	220 lb (100 kg)	1993–05–19	Iowa
F/C	21	Moritz Wagner	6 ft 11 in (2.11 m)	245 lb (111 kg)	1997–04–26	Michigan
G	2	John Wall	6 ft 4 in (1.93 m)	210 lb (95 kg)	1990–09–06	Kentucky

Coaches
Head coach
- Scott Brooks
Assistant(s)
- Tony Brown
- Jarell Christian
- Corey Gaines
- Mike Longabardi
- Robert Pack
- Mike Terpstra

Legend
- (DP) Unsigned draft pick
- (FA) Free agent
- (S) Suspended
- (GL) On assignment to G League
- (TW) Two-way affiliate player
- Injured

Roster
Updated: 2020–07–17

== Standings ==
=== Division ===
Southeast Division	W	L	PCT	GB	Home	Road	Div	GP
y – Miami Heat	44	29	.603	–	29‍–‍7	15‍–‍22	10–4	73
x – Orlando Magic	33	40	.452	11.0	18‍–‍17	15‍–‍23	9–5	73
Washington Wizards	25	47	.347	18.5	16‍–‍20	9‍–‍27	5–9	72
Charlotte Hornets	23	42	.354	17.0	10‍–‍21	13‍–‍21	2–7	65
Atlanta Hawks	20	47	.299	21.0	14‍–‍20	6‍–‍27	6–7	67

=== Conference ===
Eastern Conference
#	Team	W	L	PCT	GB	GP
1	z – Milwaukee Bucks *	56	17	.767	–	73
2	y – Toronto Raptors *	53	19	.736	2.5	72
3	x – Boston Celtics	48	24	.667	7.5	72
4	x – Indiana Pacers	45	28	.616	11.0	73
5	y – Miami Heat *	44	29	.603	12.0	73
6	x – Philadelphia 76ers	43	30	.589	13.0	73
7	x – Brooklyn Nets	35	37	.486	20.5	72
8	x – Orlando Magic	33	40	.452	23.0	73
9	Washington Wizards	25	47	.347	30.5	72
10	Charlotte Hornets	23	42	.354	29.0	65
11	Chicago Bulls	22	43	.338	30.0	65
12	New York Knicks	21	45	.318	31.5	66
13	Detroit Pistons	20	46	.303	32.5	66
14	Atlanta Hawks	20	47	.299	33.0	67
15	Cleveland Cavaliers	19	46	.292	33.0	65

== Game log ==
=== Regular season ===
2019–20 game log
Total: 25–47 (Home: 16–20; Road: 9–27)
October: 1–3 (home: 0–1; road: 1–2)

Game	Date	Team	Score	High points	High rebounds	High assists	Location Attendance	Record
1	October 23	@ Dallas	L 100–108	Bradley Beal (19)	Thomas Bryant (11)	Bradley Beal (9)	American Airlines Center; 19,816	0–1
2	October 25	@ Oklahoma City	W 97–85	Thomas Bryant (21)	Thomas Bryant (11)	Ish Smith (5)	Chesapeake Energy Arena; 18,203	1–1
3	October 26	@ San Antonio	L 122–124	Bradley Beal (25)	Rui Hachimura (8)	Bradley Beal (11)	AT&T Center; 18,354	1–2
4	October 30	Houston	L 158–159	Bradley Beal (46)	Thomas Bryant (10)	Isaiah Thomas (10)	Capital One Arena; 20,476	1–3

November: 5–8 (home: 3–3; road: 2–5)

Game	Date	Team	Score	High points	High rebounds	High assists	Location Attendance	Record
5	November 2	Minnesota	L 109–131	Bradley Beal (30)	Thomas Bryant (10)	Isaiah Thomas (7)	Capital One Arena; 15,150	1–4
6	November 4	Detroit	W 115–99	Bradley Beal (26)	Troy Brown Jr. (10)	Thomas, Beal (6)	Capital One Arena; 13,052	2–4
7	November 6	@ Indiana	L 106–121	Bradley Beal (30)	Thomas Bryant (11)	Ish Smith (7)	Bankers Life Fieldhouse; 16,171	2–5
8	November 8	Cleveland	L 100–113	Thomas Bryant (23)	Bryant, Wagner (8)	Bradley Beal (9)	Capital One Arena; 16,946	2–6
9	November 13	@ Boston	L 133–140	Bradley Beal (44)	Dāvis Bertāns (10)	Isaiah Thomas (7)	TD Garden; 19,156	2–7
10	November 15	@ Minnesota	W 137–116	Bradley Beal (44)	Moritz Wagner (15)	Bradley Beal (10)	Target Center; 12,716	3–7
11	November 17	@ Orlando	L 121–125	Bradley Beal (34)	Dāvis Bertāns (8)	Bradley Beal (8)	Amway Center; 16,344	3–8
12	November 20	San Antonio	W 138–132	Bradley Beal (33)	Rui Hachimura (7)	Bryant, Thomas (6)	Capital One Arena; 14,579	4–8
13	November 22	Charlotte	W 125–118	Bradley Beal (30)	Thomas Bryant (11)	Bradley Beal (12)	Capital One Arena; 15,053	5–8
14	November 24	Sacramento	L 106–113	Bradley Beal (20)	Moritz Wagner (11)	Bradley Beal (8)	Capital One Arena; 15,885	5–9
15	November 26	@ Denver	L 104–117	Jordan McRae (21)	Thomas Bryant (8)	Bradley Beal (6)	Pepsi Center; 18,673	5–10
16	November 27	@ Phoenix	W 140–132	Bradley Beal (35)	Thomas Bryant (9)	Ish Smith (7)	Talking Stick Resort Arena; 14,123	6–10
17	November 29	@ L. A. Lakers	L 103–125	Bradley Beal (18)	Wagner, Hachimura (8)	Bradley Beal (9)	Staples Center; 18,997	6–11

December: 4–11 (home: 2–4; road: 2–7)

Game	Date	Team	Score	High points	High rebounds	High assists	Location Attendance	Record
18	December 1	@ L. A. Clippers	L 125–150	Rui Hachimura (30)	Rui Hachimura (9)	Bradley Beal (11)	Staples Center; 19,068	6–12
19	December 3	Orlando	L 120–127	Bradley Beal (42)	Troy Brown Jr. (8)	Isaiah Thomas (7)	Capital One Arena; 13,159	6–13
20	December 5	Philadelphia	W 119–113	Rui Hachimura (27)	Moritz Wagner (11)	Ish Smith (8)	Capital One Arena; 16,554	7–13
21	December 6	@ Miami	L 103–112	Bradley Beal (23)	Dāvis Bertāns (10)	Smith, Beal (8)	American Airlines Arena; 19,600	7–14
22	December 8	L. A. Clippers	L 119–135	Dāvis Bertāns (25)	Rui Hachimura (7)	Chris Chiozza (6)	Capital One Arena; 15,946	7–15
23	December 10	@ Charlotte	L 107–114	Dāvis Bertāns (32)	Rui Hachimura (12)	Bradley Beal (9)	Spectrum Center; 10,626	7–16
24	December 14	@ Memphis	L 111–128	Bradley Beal (29)	Bradley Beal (10)	Troy Brown Jr. (5)	FedExForum; 15,631	7–17
25	December 16	@ Detroit	W 133–119	Bradley Beal (35)	Ian Mahinmi (8)	Bradley Beal (10)	Little Caesars Arena; 14,632	8–17
26	December 18	Chicago	L 109–110 (OT)	Bradley Beal (26)	Anžejs Pasečņiks (8)	Bradley Beal (7)	Capital One Arena; 14,987	8–18
27	December 20	@ Toronto	L 118–122	Bradley Beal (37)	Dāvis Bertāns (8)	Bradley Beal (6)	Scotiabank Arena; 19,800	8–19
28	December 21	@ Philadelphia	L 108–125	Bradley Beal (36)	Dāvis Bertāns (9)	Bradley Beal (6)	Wells Fargo Center; 20,529	8–20
29	December 23	@ New York	W 121–115	Bradley Beal (30)	Gary Payton II (11)	Troy Brown Jr. (7)	Madison Square Garden; 19,413	9–20
30	December 26	@ Detroit	L 102–132	Anžejs Pasečņiks (17)	Johnathan Williams (8)	Gary Payton II (5)	Little Caesars Arena; 17,188	9–21
31	December 28	New York	L 100–107	Thomas, McRae (20)	Ian Mahinmi (10)	Isaiah Thomas (4)	Capital One Arena; 19,033	9–22
32	December 30	Miami	W 123–105	Jordan McRae (29)	Anžejs Pasečņiks (10)	Jordan McRae (8)	Capital One Arena; 20,476	10–22

January: 6–9 (home: 5–2; road: 1–7)

Game	Date	Team	Score	High points	High rebounds	High assists	Location Attendance	Record
33	January 1	Orlando	L 101–122	Bradley Beal (27)	Anžejs Pasečņiks (10)	Bradley Beal (5)	Capital One Arena; 14,921	10–23
34	January 3	Portland	L 103–122	Jordan McRae (35)	Anžejs Pasečņiks (9)	Ish Smith (5)	Capital One Arena; 17,945	10–24
35	January 4	Denver	W 128–114	Ish Smith (32)	Troy Brown Jr. (14)	Ish Smith (8)	Capital One Arena; 16,233	11–24
36	January 6	Boston	W 99–94	Ish Smith (27)	Troy Brown Jr. (9)	Smith, Mahinmi (4)	Capital One Arena; 17,963	12–24
37	January 8	@ Orlando	L 89–123	Schofield, Brown Jr. (18)	Troy Brown Jr. (11)	Troy Brown Jr. (5)	Amway Center; 16,013	12–25
38	January 10	Atlanta	W 111–101	Jordan McRae (29)	Troy Brown Jr. (10)	Ish Smith (9)	Capital One Arena; 16,360	13–25
39	January 12	Utah	L 116–127	Bradley Beal (25)	Isaac Bonga (7)	Smith, Mahinmi (7)	Capital One Arena; 15,953	13–26
40	January 15	@ Chicago	L 106–115	Bradley Beal (23)	Ian Mahinmi (7)	Ish Smith (5)	United Center; 19,382	13–27
41	January 17	@ Toronto	L 111–140	Troy Brown Jr. (22)	Isaac Bonga (10)	Ish Smith (8)	Scotiabank Arena; 19,800	13–28
42	January 20	Detroit	W 106–100	Bradley Beal (29)	Jordan McRae (8)	Smith, Beal (6)	Capital One Arena; 17,305	14–28
43	January 22	@ Miami	L 129–134 (OT)	Bradley Beal (38)	Ian Mahinmi (10)	Beal, McRae (5)	American Airlines Arena; 19,600	14–29
44	January 23	@ Cleveland	W 124–112	Bradley Beal (36)	Troy Brown Jr. (8)	Bradley Beal (8)	Rocket Mortgage FieldHouse; 16,689	15–29
45	January 26	@ Atlanta	L 133–152	Bradley Beal (40)	Jordan McRae (7)	Bradley Beal (6)	State Farm Arena; 15,567	15–30
46	January 28	@ Milwaukee	L 131–151	Bradley Beal (47)	Thomas Bryant (10)	Beal, Bryant, Smith (6)	Fiserv Forum; 17,681	15–31
47	January 30	Charlotte	W 121–107	Bradley Beal (34)	Bradley Beal (9)	Bradley Beal (9)	Capital One Arena; 15,013	16–31

February: 5–6 (home: 4–4; road: 1–2)

Game	Date	Team	Score	High points	High rebounds	High assists	Location Attendance	Record
48	February 1	Brooklyn	W 113–107	Bradley Beal (34)	Thomas Bryant (10)	Ish Smith (4)	Capital One Arena; 18,196	17–31
49	February 3	Golden State	L 117–125	Bradley Beal (43)	Rui Hachimura (8)	Beal, Smith (6)	Capital One Arena; 17,120	17–32
50	February 7	Dallas	W 119–118	Bradley Beal (29)	Dāvis Bertāns (8)	Bradley Beal (8)	Capital One Arena; 20,476	18–32
51	February 9	Memphis	L 99–106	Bradley Beal (26)	Rui Hachimura (11)	Shabazz Napier (6)	Capital One Arena; 17,251	18–33
52	February 11	Chicago	W 126–114	Bradley Beal (30)	Jerome Robinson (9)	Ish Smith (9)	Capital One Arena; 15,135	19–33
53	February 12	@ New York	W 114–96	Bradley Beal (30)	Ian Mahinmi (10)	Troy Brown Jr. (6)	Madison Square Garden; 18,835	20–33
54	February 21	Cleveland	L 108–113	Bradley Beal (26)	Dāvis Bertāns (8)	Ish Smith (6)	Capital One Arena; 18,895	20–34
55	February 23	@ Chicago	L 117–126	Bradley Beal (53)	Rui Hachimura (8)	Ish Smith (5)	United Center; 18,024	20–35
56	February 24	Milwaukee	L 134–137 (OT)	Bradley Beal (55)	Moritz Wagner (10)	Napier, Smith (7)	Capital One Arena; 16,580	20–36
57	February 26	Brooklyn	W 110–106	Bradley Beal (30)	Thomas Bryant (7)	Beal, Napier, Smith (5)	Capital One Arena; 15,021	21–36
58	February 28	@ Utah	L 119–129	Bradley Beal (42)	Rui Hachimura (7)	Bradley Beal (10)	Vivint Smart Home Arena; 18,306	21–37

March: 3–3 (home: 2–1; road: 1–2)

Game	Date	Team	Score	High points	High rebounds	High assists	Location Attendance	Record
59	March 1	@ Golden State	W 124–110	Bradley Beal (34)	Rui Hachimura (8)	Bradley Beal (8)	Chase Center; 18,064	22–37
60	March 3	@ Sacramento	L 126–133	Bradley Beal (35)	Davis Bertans (7)	Bradley Beal (8)	Golden 1 Center; 16,419	22–38
61	March 4	@ Portland	L 104–125	Bradley Beal (29)	Moritz Wagner (9)	Bradley Beal (6)	Moda Center; 19,393	22–39
62	March 6	Atlanta	W 118–112	Bradley Beal (35)	Rui Hachimura (8)	Shabazz Napier (6)	Capital One Arena; 17,856	23–39
63	March 8	Miami	L 89–100	Shabazz Napier (27)	Brown Jr., Hachimura (6)	Shabazz Napier (7)	Capital One Arena; 18,135	23–40
64	March 10	New York	W 122–115	Bradley Beal (40)	Thomas Bryant (10)	Bradley Beal (7)	Capital One Arena; 15,048	24–40

Seeding games: 1–7 (home: 0–4; road: 1–3)

Game	Date	Team	Score	High points	High rebounds	High assists	Location Attendance	Record
65	July 31	Phoenix	L 112–125	Rui Hachimura (21)	Rui Hachimura (8)	Ish Smith (7)	Visa Athletic Center; No In-Person Attendance	24–41
66	August 2	@ Brooklyn	L 110–118	Thomas Bryant (30)	Thomas Bryant (13)	Troy Brown Jr. (8)	HP Field House; No In-Person Attendance	24–42
67	August 3	Indiana	L 100–111	Thomas Bryant (20)	Brown Jr., Bryant (7)	Thomas Bryant (11)	Visa Athletic Center; No In-Person Attendance	24–43
68	August 5	Philadelphia	L 98–107	Bryant, Robinson (19)	Thomas Bryant (10)	Ish Smith (6)	The Arena; No In-Person Attendance	24–44
69	August 7	@ New Orleans	L 107–118	Rui Hachimura (23)	Troy Brown Jr. (10)	Ish Smith (5)	Visa Athletic Center; No In-Person Attendance	24–45
70	August 9	@ Oklahoma City	L 103–121	Jerome Robinson (19)	three players (8)	Jerome Robinson (6)	The Arena; No In-Person Attendance	24–46
71	August 11	Milwaukee	L 113–126	Rui Hachimura (20)	Thomas Bryant (8)	Jerome Robinson (7)	Visa Athletic Center; No In-Person Attendance	24–47
72	August 13	@ Boston	W 96–90	Thomas Bryant (26)	Johnathan Williams (16)	Ish Smith (8)	The Arena; No In-Person Attendance	25–47

Cancelled games

Game	Date	Team	Score	High points	High rebounds	High assists	Location Attendance	Record
65	March 13	@ Boston					TD Garden	
66	March 15	Oklahoma City					Capital One Arena	
67	March 16	@ Philadelphia					Wells Fargo Center	
68	March 18	@ Brooklyn					Barclays Center	
69	March 20	@ Atlanta					State Farm Arena	
70	March 21	Milwaukee					Capital One Arena	
71	March 23	Boston					Capital One Arena	
72	March 25	Phoenix					Capital One Arena	
73	March 27	@ Milwaukee					Fiserv Forum	
74	March 28	LA Lakers					Capital One Arena	
75	April 1	New Orleans					Capital One Arena	
76	April 3	Philadelphia					Capital One Arena	
77	April 5	@ Indiana					Bankers Life Fieldhouse	
78	April 7	Toronto					Capital One Arena	
79	April 10	@ Houston					Toyota Center	
80	April 11	@ Charlotte					Spectrum Center	
81	April 13	@ New Orleans					Smoothie King Center	
82	April 15	Indiana					Capital One Arena	

2019–20 season schedule

== Player statistics ==
Legend
GP	Games played	GS	Games started	MPG	Minutes per game
FG%	Field-goal percentage	3P%	3-point field-goal percentage	FT%	Free-throw percentage
RPG	Rebounds per game	APG	Assists per game	SPG	Steals per game
BPG	Blocks per game	PPG	Points per game

=== Regular season ===
Washington Wizards statistics
Player	GP	GS	MPG	FG%	3P%	FT%	RPG	APG	SPG	BPG	PPG
Troy Brown Jr.	69	22	25.8	.439	.341	.784	5.6	2.6	1.2	.1	10.4
Ish Smith	68	23	26.3	.447	.367	.721	3.2	4.9	.9	.4	10.9
Isaac Bonga	66	49	18.9	.504	.352	.812	3.4	1.2	.7	.3	5.0
Bradley Beal	57	57	36.0	.455	.353	.842	4.2	6.1	1.2	.4	30.5
Dāvis Bertāns	54	4	29.3	.434	.424	.852	4.5	1.7	.7	.6	15.4
Rui Hachimura	48	48	30.1	.466	.287	.829	6.1	1.8	.8	.2	13.5
Thomas Bryant	46	36	24.9	.581	.407	.741	7.2	1.8	.5	1.1	13.2
Moritz Wagner	45	5	18.6	.545	.313	.821	4.9	1.2	.6	.4	8.7
Isaiah Thomas	40	37	23.1	.408	.413	.816	1.7	3.7	.3	.2	12.2
Ian Mahinmi	38	35	21.3	.495	.192	.619	5.7	1.3	.8	1.2	7.4
Admiral Schofield	33	2	11.2	.380	.311	.667	1.4	.5	.2	.1	3.0
Gary Payton II	29	17	14.9	.414	.283	.500	2.8	1.7	1.1	.2	3.9
Jordan McRae^{†}	29	4	22.6	.420	.377	.771	3.6	2.8	.7	.5	12.8
Anžejs Pasečņiks	27	0	16.2	.526	.000	.586	4.0	.7	.3	.4	5.8
Jerome Robinson^{†}	21	5	24.0	.397	.349	.763	3.3	2.0	.7	.4	9.4
Shabazz Napier^{†}	20	10	24.4	.428	.358	.831	2.4	3.8	1.5	.2	11.6
Garrison Mathews	18	0	12.6	.429	.413	.912	1.3	.6	.4	.1	5.4
Johnathan Williams	15	6	12.0	.559	.000	.538	4.3	.5	.1	.5	3.0
C. J. Miles	10	0	16.1	.322	.314	.750	1.2	1.2	1.0	.4	6.4
Chris Chiozza^{†}	10	0	12.3	.294	.438		1.5	2.8	1.0	.2	2.7
Justin Robinson	9	0	5.4	.417	.600		.6	.8	.0	.1	1.4
Jerian Grant	6	0	13.3	.370	.250	.714	1.0	1.5	.2	.2	4.5
Jarrod Uthoff^{†}	3	0	13.0	.545	.600		1.7	.0	.0	.0	5.0

- ^{†} Denotes player spent time with another team in the season. Stats reflect time with the Wizards only.

== Transactions ==
=== Trades ===
June 20, 2019	To Washington Wizards: Draft rights to Admiral Schofield (#42); Jonathon Simmons	To Philadelphia 76ers: Cash Considerations	
July 1, 2019	To Washington Wizards: Second-round pick in the 2020 NBA draft; Further draft considerations	To Chicago Bulls: Tomas Satoransky	
July 5, 2019	To Washington Wizards: C.J. Miles	To Memphis Grizzlies: Dwight Howard	
July 6, 2019	To Washington Wizards: Dāvis Bertāns (from San Antonio)	To San Antonio Spurs: DeMarre Carroll (from Brooklyn)	To Brooklyn Nets: Draft rights to Aaron White (from Washington); Draft rights to Nemanja Dangubic (from San Antonio)
July 7, 2019	To Washington Wizards: Moritz Wagner (from L.A. Lakers); Isaac Bonga (from L.A. Lakers); Jemerrio Jones (from L.A. Lakers); Second-round pick in 2022 NBA draft (from L.A. Lakers)	To Los Angeles Lakers: Anthony Davis (with waiver of $4M Trade Kicker) (from New Orleans); First-round pick in the 2023 NBA draft (from New Orleans)	To New Orleans Pelicans: Lonzo Ball (from L.A. Lakers); Brandon Ingram (from L.A. Lakers); Josh Hart (from L.A. Lakers); Draft rights to De'Andre Hunter (#4) (from L.A. Lakers); Protected First-round pick in the 2021 NBA draft (from L.A. Lakers); First-round pick in the 2023 NBA draft (from L.A. Lakers); First-round pick in the 2024 NBA draft (from L.A. Lakers); Cash Considerations ($1.1M, from Washington)
February 6, 2020	To Washington Wizards: Jerome Robinson (from L.A. Clippers)	To Los Angeles Clippers: Isaiah Thomas (from Washington); Marcus Morris (from New York)	To New York Knicks: Maurice Harkless (from L.A. Clippers); 2020 LAC first-round pick; 2021 LAC protected first-round pick; 2021 DET second-round pick; Draft rights to Issuf Sanon (from Washington)
February 6, 2020	To Washington Wizards: Shabazz Napier	To Denver Nuggets: Jordan McRae	

=== Re-signed ===
Player	Date Signed	Contract	Ref.
Thomas Bryant	June 30, 2019	3 years, $25M	
Bradley Beal	October 17, 2019	2 years, $72M (extension)	

=== Additions ===
Player	Date Signed	Contract	Former Team	Ref.
Ish Smith	July 1, 2019	2 years, $12M	Detroit Pistons	
Isaiah Thomas	July 2, 2019	1 year, $2.3M	Denver Nuggets	
Garrison Mathews	July 3, 2019	Two-way contract	Lipscomb Bisons (Note: Player signed as an Undrafted Free Agent (UDFA) out of college.)	
Justin Robinson	July 13, 2019	3 years, $4.2M (MLE)	Virginia Tech Hokies	
Chris Chiozza	October 21, 2019	Two-way contract	Houston Rockets	
Anžejs Pasečņiks	December 17, 2019	Two-way contract (Note: Pasečņiks' contract was converted to a standard NBA contract on January 12, 2020.)	Capital City Go-Go	
Gary Payton II	December 23, 2019	Hardship Exception	South Bay Lakers	
Johnathan Williams	December 26, 2019	Hardship Exception (Note: Williams was waived January 4, 2020, but was re-signed to a Two-Way Contract on January 12, 2020.)	(Israel) Maccabi Rishon LeZion	
Jerian Grant	July 1, 2020	Substitute Contract	Capital City Go-Go	
Jarrod Uthoff	July 17, 2020	Substitute Contract	Memphis Hustle	

=== Subtractions ===
Player	Date Left	Reason Left	New Team	Ref.
Sam Dekker	June 29, 2019	RFA, no offer	(Russia) Lokomotiv Kuban	
Chasson Randle	June 29, 2019	RFA, no offer		
Trevor Ariza	June 30, 2019	UFA	Sacramento Kings	
Bobby Portis	July 1, 2019	RFA, rescinded offer	New York Knicks	
Tomas Satoransky	July 1, 2019	RFA, Sign and trade	Chicago Bulls	
Jeff Green	July 2, 2019	UFA	Utah Jazz	
Jonathon Simmons	July 7, 2019	Waived		
Jabari Parker	July 8, 2019	UFA	Atlanta Hawks	
Tarik Phillip	August 15, 2019	Waived	(Turkey) Tofaş	
Jemerrio Jones	October 16, 2019	Waived	Milwaukee Bucks	
Chris Chiozza	December 17, 2019	Waived	Brooklyn Nets	
Justin Robinson	January 5, 2020	Waived	Delaware Blue Coats	
C.J. Miles	January 12, 2020	Waived		
