= Thomas Bryant =

American basketball player (born 1997)

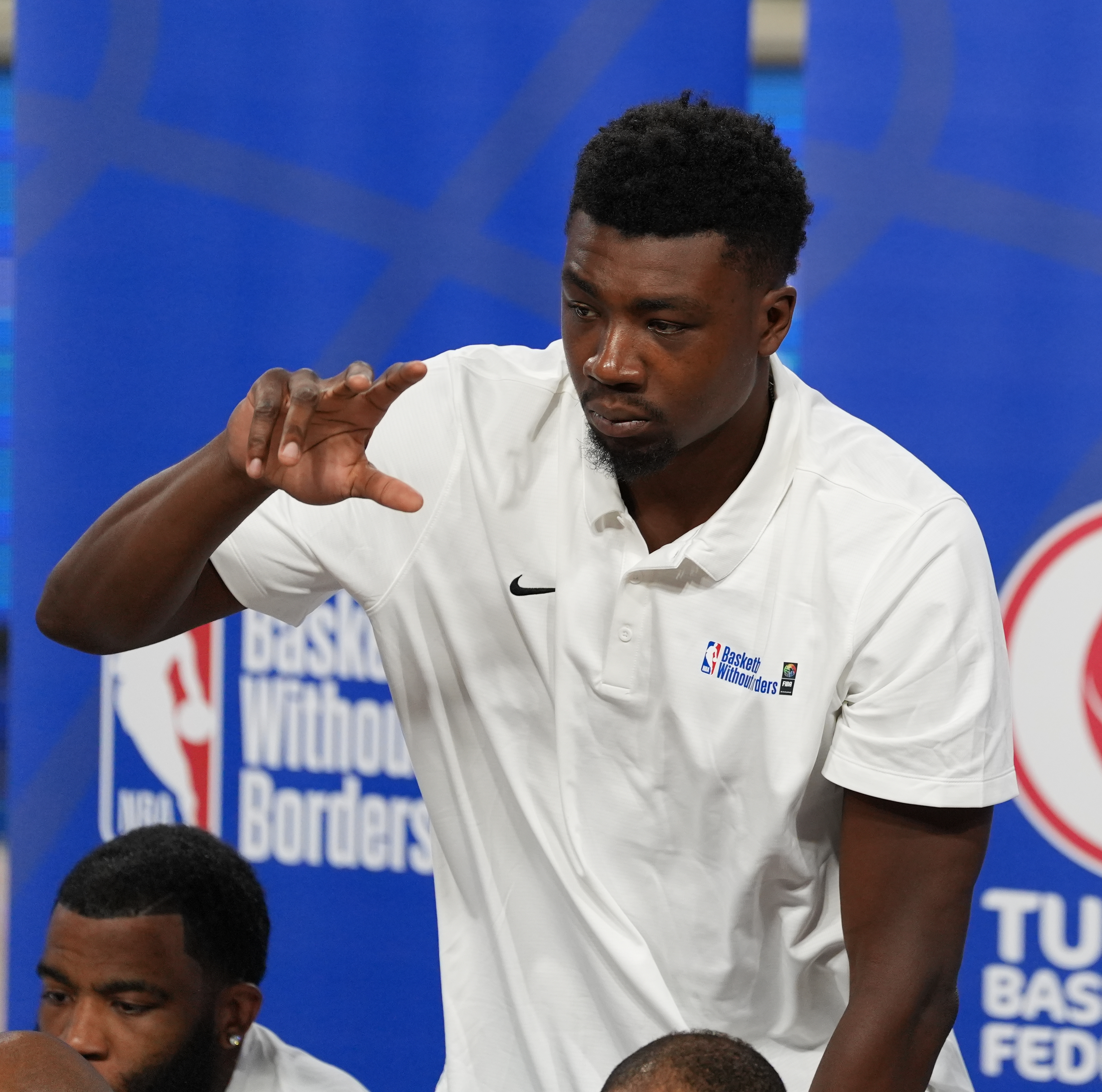
- Bryant in 2026

No. 3 – Cleveland Cavaliers
- Position: Center / power forward
- League: NBA

Personal information
- Born: July 31, 1997 (age 29) Rochester, New York, U.S.
- Listed height: 6 ft 9 in (2.06 m)
- Listed weight: 260 lb (118 kg)

Career information
- High school: Bishop Kearney (Irondequoit, New York); Huntington Prep (Huntington, West Virginia)
- College: Indiana (2015–2017)
- NBA draft: 2017: 2nd round, 42nd overall pick
- Drafted by: Utah Jazz
- Playing career: 2017–present

Career history
- 2017–2018: Los Angeles Lakers
- 2017–2018: →South Bay Lakers
- 2018–2022: Washington Wizards
- 2022–2023: Los Angeles Lakers
- 2023: Denver Nuggets
- 2023–2024: Miami Heat
- 2024–2025: Indiana Pacers
- 2025–present: Cleveland Cavaliers

Career highlights
- NBA champion (2023); First-team All NBA G League (2018); NBA G League All-Rookie Team (2018); 2× Third-team All-Big Ten (2016, 2017); Big Ten All-Freshman team (2016); McDonald's All-American (2015)
- Stats at NBA.com
- Stats at Basketball Reference

Thomas Jermaine Bryant (born July 31, 1997) is an American professional basketball player for the Cleveland Cavaliers of the National Basketball Association (NBA). He played college basketball for the Indiana Hoosiers from 2015 to 2017. Bryant was a member of the Denver Nuggets team that won the 2023 NBA Finals.

== High school career ==
Bryant played basketball at Bishop Kearney, where as a sophomore he led his team to a 17–8 record, the 2013 New York Class AA Tournament crown, and the New York Federation Tournament of Champions.

After his sophomore year, Bryant transferred to Huntington Prep School in Huntington, West Virginia during the 2014 school year. As a junior, he averaged 13.9 points, 12.9 rebounds and 2.8 blocks per game. While there, he played on the AAU team, Team SCAN on the Nike Elite Youth Basketball League Circuit. On January 3, 2015, Bryant scored 23 points and 12 rebounds in a 89–49 win over Whitney Young. As a senior, Bryant averaged 17.3 points, 11.6 rebounds, 4.5 blocks and 2.5 steals per game. He was ranked the 20th-best recruit in the 2015 class by ESPN and was recruited heavily by many schools, including Indiana, Kentucky, Syracuse, UCLA and other power conference schools. However, his final decision came down to Indiana and Syracuse. According to Bryant's mother, who was heavily in favor of Syracuse, " [he] picked Indiana because Syracuse's basketball program was in chaos." While Bryant was trying to decide which school to attend, Syracuse was in the middle of an NCAA investigation, which eventually led to the loss of 12 scholarships over the next four years, 108 vacated wins, and Jim Boeheim being suspended for the first 9 games of the 2015–16 ACC season.

Bryant's final verbal commitment to Indiana was televised live on April 4, 2015, during the Dick's Sporting Goods National Tournament on ESPN.

During the McDonald's All-American Game, Bryant scored 9 points and grabbed 3 rebounds in 16 minutes of play for the East team. He was the fifth consecutive McDonald's All-American Tom Crean was able to recruit to play at IU.

== College career ==
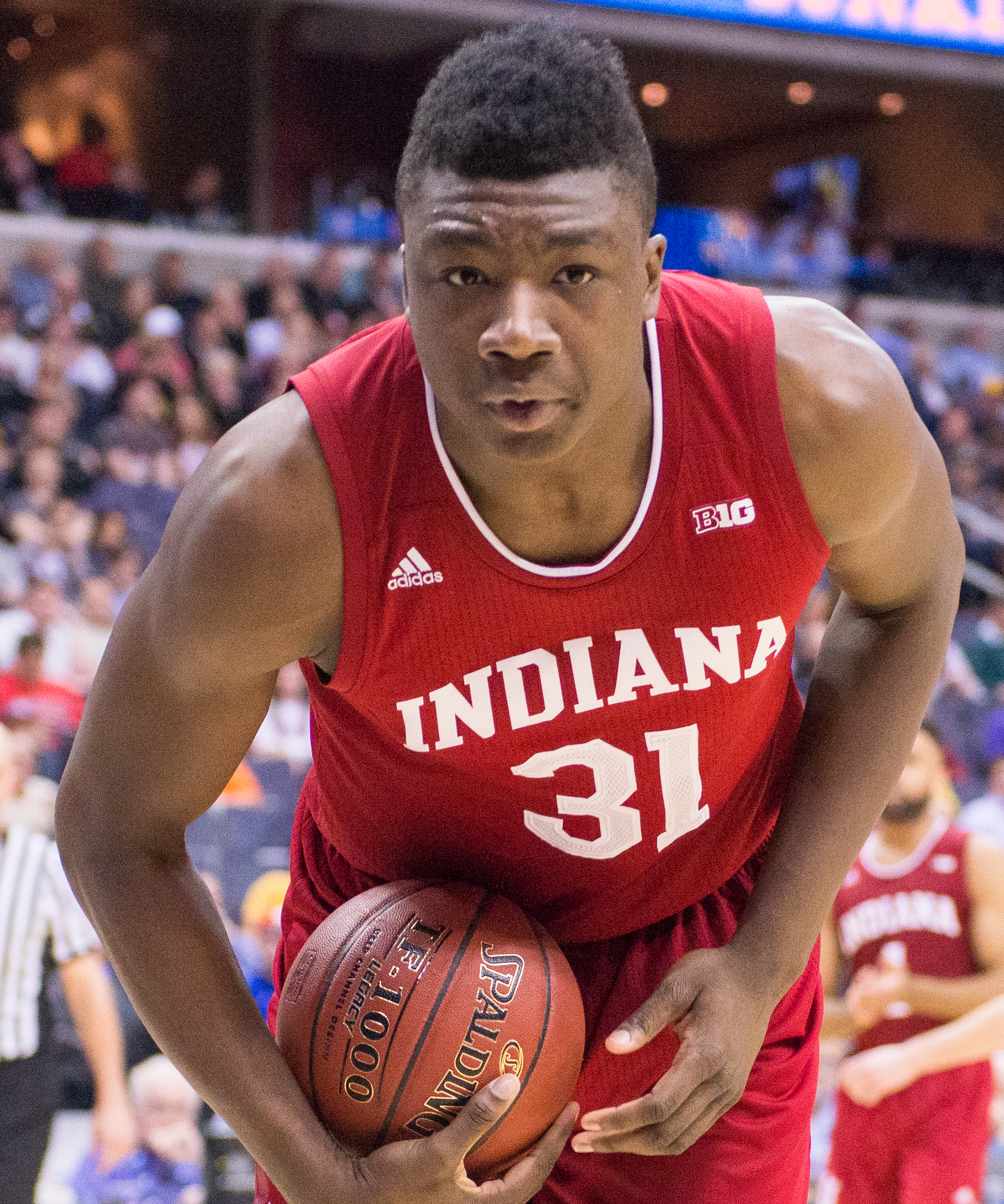
Bryant in 2017

Bryant had a break out performance in an 86–65 win against Creighton. He recorded 17 points, 7 rebounds and 4 blocks in the Hoosiers win. Bryant contributed 19 points and five rebounds in a win over Kentucky in the NCAA tournament. Bryant averaged 11.9 points and 5.8 rebounds per game as a freshman. After the season, Bryant was named both Big Ten All-Freshman team as well as third-team All-Big Ten.

Bryant announced his return for his sophomore year. His shooting percentage declined as a sophomore, but Bryant averaged 12.6 points, 6.6 rebounds and 1.5 blocks per game. Bryant was projected as a possible top 5 pick in the 2017 NBA draft heading into the season along with teammate OG Anunoby.

== Professional career ==
=== Los Angeles / South Bay Lakers (2017–2018) ===
On June 22, 2017, Bryant was drafted 42nd overall in the 2017 NBA draft by the Utah Jazz. He was later traded along with the 30th pick, Josh Hart, to the Los Angeles Lakers in exchange for the Lakers' 28th pick, Tony Bradley. On July 30, 2017, Bryant signed his rookie-scale contract with the Lakers. After his one season with the team, on June 30, 2018, the Lakers waived Bryant.

The Lakers frequently assigned Bryant to their G League affiliate, the South Bay Lakers, during the season. Following the 2017–18 season, he was named to the All-NBA G League First Team.

=== Washington Wizards (2018–2022) ===
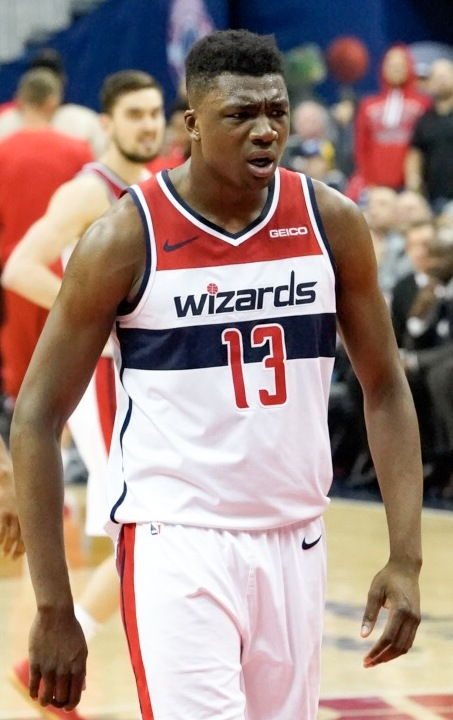
Bryant with the Wizards in 2019

On July 2, 2018, Bryant was claimed off waivers by the Washington Wizards.

On December 22, 2018, Bryant shot 14 of 14 and scored a career-high 31 points against the Phoenix Suns, tying for the fourth-most field goals made without a miss in NBA history, with only Wilt Chamberlain exceeding the 14-field-goal mark.

On July 7, 2019, Bryant re-signed with the Wizards on a three-year, $25 million contract. On February 19, 2020, Bleacher Report named Bryant the worst defensive center in the NBA. On August 2, Bryant recorded season highs of 30 points and 13 rebounds in a 110–118 loss to the Brooklyn Nets.

On January 10, 2021, the Wizards announced that Bryant had suffered a partially torn anterior cruciate ligament in his left knee during a 124–128 loss to Miami Heat a day before. The injury ended his season, with Bryant only having played ten games.

On January 12, 2022, Bryant made his return for the Wizards, scoring six points in a 112–106 win over the Orlando Magic.

=== Return to the Lakers (2022–2023) ===
On July 6, 2022, Bryant signed with the Los Angeles Lakers on a one-year contract. On December 18, he made a game-winning dunk in a 119–117 win over his former team, the Washington Wizards. On January 22, 2023, Bryant tied his career high of 31 points, alongside 14 rebounds, in a 121–112 win over the Portland Trail Blazers.

=== Denver Nuggets (2023) ===
On February 9, 2023, Bryant was traded to the Denver Nuggets in a four-team trade involving the Los Angeles Clippers and Orlando Magic. The Nuggets defeated the Miami Heat in the NBA Finals in five games to give Bryant his first NBA championship.

=== Miami Heat (2023–2024) ===
On July 2, 2023, Bryant signed a reported two-year, $5.4 million contract with the Miami Heat and on July 3, 2024, he re-signed with the Heat.

=== Indiana Pacers (2024–2025) ===
On December 15, 2024, Bryant was traded to the Indiana Pacers in exchange for the right to swap second-round picks in the 2031 NBA draft. With the Pacers, he reached the 2025 NBA Finals, losing to the Oklahoma City Thunder in seven games.

=== Cleveland Cavaliers (2025–present) ===
On September 23, 2025, Bryant signed a one-year contract with the Cleveland Cavaliers. He made 60 appearances (including one start) for Cleveland during the 2025–26 season, recording averages of 6.2 points and 3.4 rebounds.

On June 29, 2026, Bryant re-signed with the Cavaliers on a one-year, $3.5 million contract.

== Career statistics ==
Legend
GP	Games played	GS	Games started	MPG	Minutes per game
FG%	Field goal percentage	3P%	3-point field goal percentage	FT%	Free throw percentage
RPG	Rebounds per game	APG	Assists per game	SPG	Steals per game
BPG	Blocks per game	PPG	Points per game	**Bold**	Career high
†	Won an NBA championship

=== NBA ===
==== Regular season ====
Year	Team	GP	GS	MPG	FG%	3P%	FT%	RPG	APG	SPG	BPG	PPG
2017–18	L.A. Lakers	15	0	4.8	.381	.100	.556	1.1	.4	.1	.1	1.5
2018–19	Washington	**72**	**53**	20.8	.616	.333	.781	6.3	1.3	.3	.9	10.5
2019–20	Washington	46	36	24.9	.581	.407	.741	**7.2**	**1.8**	**.5**	**1.1**	13.2
2020–21	Washington	10	10	**27.1**	.648	.429	.667	6.1	1.5	.4	.8	**14.3**
2021–22	Washington	27	9	16.3	.520	.286	.875	4.0	.9	.2	.8	7.4
2022–23^{†}	L.A. Lakers	41	25	21.4	**.654**	.440	.741	6.8	.7	.3	.6	12.1
2022–23^{†}	Denver	18	1	11.4	.485	**.444**	.722	3.3	.1	.1	.4	4.6
2023–24	Miami	38	4	11.6	.577	.182	.872	3.7	.6	.3	.4	5.7
2024–25	Miami	10	0	11.5	.429	.353	**1.000**	3.2	.4	.1	.9	4.1
2024–25	Indiana	56	8	15.1	.515	.321	.830	3.9	.9	**.5**	.6	6.9
2025–26	Cleveland	60	1	12.2	.506	.359	.803	3.4	.6	.3	.4	6.2
Career		393	147	16.9	.573	.348	.781	4.9	.9	.3	.7	8.5

==== Playoffs ====
Year	Team	GP	GS	MPG	FG%	3P%	FT%	RPG	APG	SPG	BPG	PPG
2023^{†}	Denver	1	0	.5	—	—	—	.0	.0	.0	.0	.0
2024	Miami	2	0	**8.9**	**.714**	.000	.667	**2.5**	**.5**	.0	.0	**6.0**
2025	Indiana	**20**	0	8.4	.485	**.500**	.786	1.4	.2	**.2**	**.3**	2.6
2026	Cleveland	9	0	4.6	.286	.167	**1.000**	1.2	.2	**.2**	.1	1.9
Career		32	0	7.1	.443	.344	.800	1.3	.2	.2	.2	2.5

=== College ===
Year	Team	GP	GS	MPG	FG%	3P%	FT%	RPG	APG	SPG	BPG	PPG
2015–16	Indiana	**35**	**35**	22.6	**.683**	.333	.706	5.8	1.0	.5	.9	11.9
2016–17	Indiana	34	34	**28.1**	.519	**.383**	**.730**	**6.6**	**1.5**	**.8**	**1.5**	**12.6**
Career		69	69	25.3	.592	.373	.718	6.2	1.2	.6	1.2	12.2
