= St. Pius X High School (Albuquerque) =

High School in Albuquerque, New Mexico

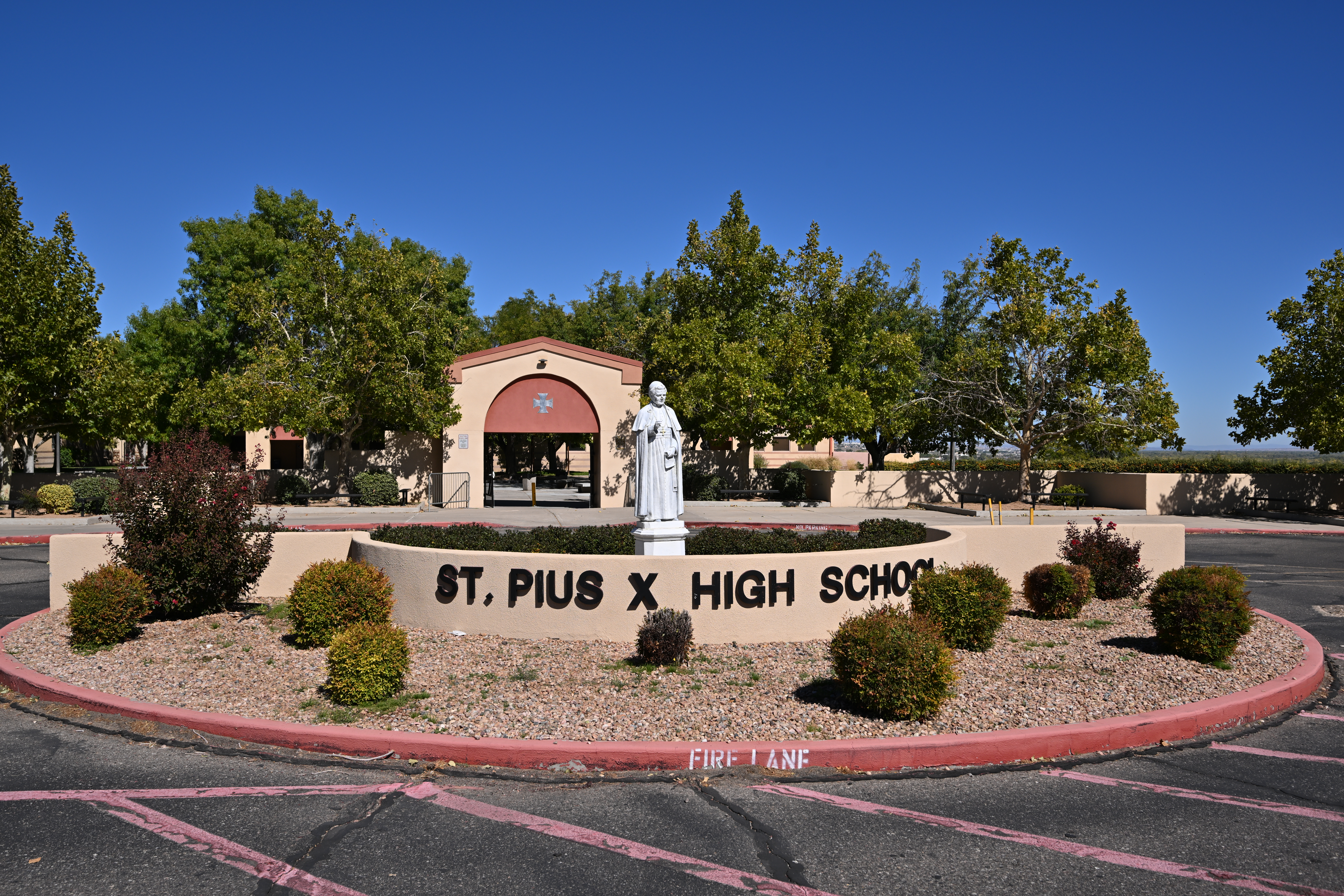

Location
- 5301 Saint Joseph's Drive NW; Albuquerque, New Mexico, (Bernalillo County) 87120; United States
- Coordinates: 35°7′49″N 106°41′53″W

Information
- Type: Private, coeducational middle and high school
- Motto: "Teach me goodness, discipline, and knowledge"
- Religious affiliation: Roman Catholic
- Established: 1956
- Head teacher: Michael Deely
- Chaplain: Fr. John Trambley
- Grades: 6-12
- Enrollment: 936 (2009)
- Language: English
- Campus type: Suburban
- Colors: Black, gold, white
- Fight song: Sartan Chant
- Athletics conference: NMAA, AAAA Dist. 5
- Mascot: Sarto
- Team name: Sartan
- Rival: Albuquerque Academy
- Accreditation: North Central Association of Colleges and Schools
- Newspaper: "Connections, Est. 1956"
- Yearbook: "Chi-Ro"
- Website: www.saintpiusx.com

St. Pius X High School is a private, Roman Catholic middle and high school in Albuquerque, New Mexico. It was established in 1956. It is administered in the Roman Catholic Archdiocese of Santa Fe.

The school is located on Albuquerque's west side, on the campus that was formerly the location of the University of Albuquerque. St. Pius X is a co-educational institution that serves over 900 students in grades six through twelve.

== History ==
St. Pius X High School was founded in 1956 with 116 freshmen composing its first class. St. Pius was initially housed at St Charles Elementary School until the completion of a new campus in the Northeast Heights in the fall of 1959. In 1986, the Archdiocese of Santa Fe announced that St. Pius X would be moved to Albuquerque's west side to occupy the site of the University of Albuquerque, scheduled to close that year. The former St. Pius campus was razed to make way for a mixed-use development called The Commons; however, this project fell apart and the land remained vacant until the ABQ Uptown shopping mall was built there in 2005–06.

Upon moving to the west side campus, St. Pius renovated the existing buildings of Assumption Hall and St. Francis Hall and completed construction of a new science building, gymnasium, and St. Basil Hall (2000). The new 40-acre campus welcomed its first students in the fall of 1988.

== Mascot ==
The name is a contraction of Pope Pius X's name Giuseppe Sarto. It is used because the patron saint embodied the characteristics of charity, good humor, fair play, and faithfulness—the same high ideals that St. Pius X High School hopes to instill in its students. In Italian, Sarto is translated as “Tailor.” Thus a Sartan is one who tailors his life after these ideals and actively supports his motto: “To restore all things in Christ.”

== Student body statistics ==
St. Pius High School has a student body that slightly mirrors the ethnic makeup of Albuquerque. 55% Hispanic, 40% White, 5% Native American, 1% African American and 3% Asian. Though the vast majority of students at St. Pius X are Catholic, the school is open to students of all faiths, offering a college prep education, along with total, supportive Christian spiritual formation. Tuition has risen steadily over the years to reach around $13,000 for the 2020–2021 school year. St. Pius X is Albuquerque's only Roman Catholic high school, and one of the few private institutions.

== Notable alumni ==
- Mike Mullane, NASA astronaut, veteran of three Space Shuttle missions.
- Dennis Jett, former U.S. Ambassador to Peru
- John Cameron Mitchell, actor and filmmaker (Hedwig and the Angry Inch, Shortbus, Rabbit Hole).
- Jesse Tyler Ferguson, actor (Modern Family).
- Mike Judge, Director, best known as the creator and star of the popular animated television series Beavis and Butt-Head (1993–1997, 2011), King of the Hill (1997–2010), and The Goode Family (2009).
- Tim Keller, former New Mexico state auditor and current mayor of Albuquerque.
- Cisco McSorley, Democratic member of the New Mexico Senate, representing the 16th District since 1997.
- Jacob Candelaria, Democratic member of the New Mexico Senate, representing the 26th District since 2012.
- Patrick D. Gallagher, physicist, former director of the U.S. Department of Commerce's National Institute of Standards and Technology (NIST) and current chancellor of the University of Pittsburgh.
- Tommy Sheppard, general manager of the NBA's Washington Wizards

== State championships ==
The Sartans compete in District 2/5 Class AAAA in New Mexico

Boys

- Football (3) - 1973, 1999, 2016
- Soccer (18) - 1988, 1990, 1993, 1994, 1995, 1996, 1997, 1998, 1999, 2000, 2002, 2003, 2004, 2005, 2006, 2007, 2008, 2023
- Basketball (7) - 1980, 1982, 1985, 2006, 2007, 2008, 2013
- Golf (2) - 1981, 2016
- Baseball (13) - 1964, 1977, 1979, 1981, 1983, 1984, 1988, 2003, 2013, 2019, 2021, 2022, 2023
- Tennis (1) - 2002

Girls

- Volleyball (8) - 1994, 1997, 1999, 2002, 2003, 2012, 2016, 2020, 2023, 2024
- Soccer (10) - 1999, 2004, 2005, 2006, 2007, 2013, 2014, 2015, 2020, 2021
- Basketball (4) - 1979, 2006, 2008, 2009
- Softball (1) - 1986
- Golf (1) - 2018
- Tennis (1) - 1999
- Cheerleading (1) - 2001

== Academic Decathlon ==
The Saint Pius X Academic Decathlon team competes in USAD (United States Academic Decathlon). At the National Level the team frequently competes in Division III since divisions began in 1999.

- State Championships (24) - 1998, 1999, 2000, 2001, 2004, 2005, 2007, 2008, 2010, 2011, 2012, 2013, 2014, 2015, 2016, 2017, 2018, 2019, 2020, 2021, 2022, 2023, 2024, 2025
- National Championship: Small School Division (1) - 1999
- Top Three Placement at National Finals: Small School Division (5) - 1999, 2001, 2021, 2022, 2023
- National Championship of Super Quiz in Division: (2) - 1998, 2025
- Top Three Placement at National Super Quiz: (7) - 1998, 1999, 2001, 2019, 2021, 2022, 2025
- National Gold Medal, Speech Showcase (4) - 1999, 2001, 2004, 2010
