= Troy Brown Jr. =

American basketball player (born 1999)

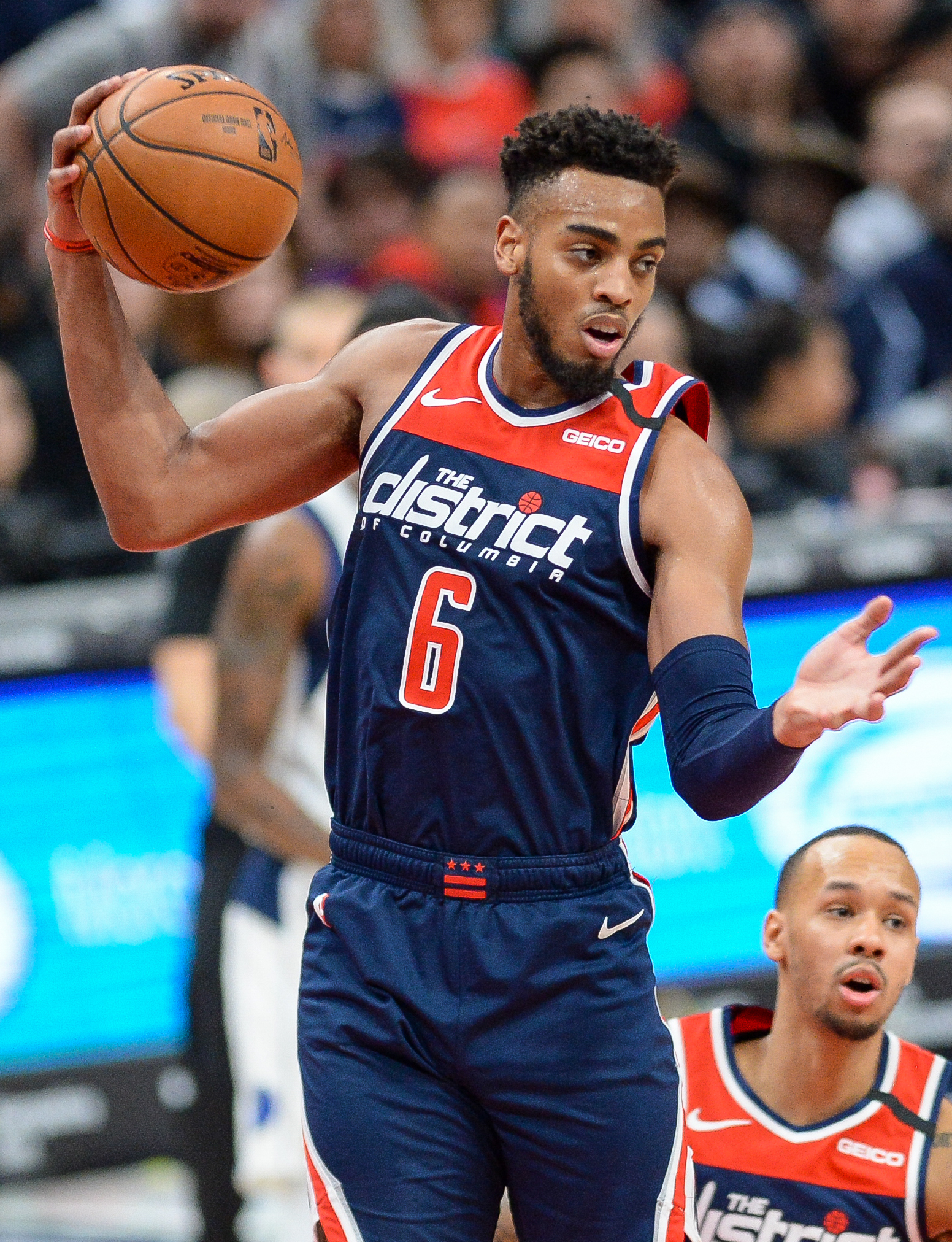
- Brown with the Washington Wizards in 2020

Free agent
- Position: Small forward / shooting guard

Personal information
- Born: July 28, 1999 (age 27) Las Vegas, Nevada, U.S.
- Listed height: 6 ft 7 in (2.01 m)
- Listed weight: 215 lb (98 kg)

Career information
- High school: Centennial (Las Vegas, Nevada)
- College: Oregon (2017–2018)
- NBA draft: 2018: 1st round, 15th overall pick
- Drafted by: Washington Wizards
- Playing career: 2018–present

Career history
- 2018–2021: Washington Wizards
- 2018–2019: →Capital City Go-Go
- 2021–2022: Chicago Bulls
- 2022–2023: Los Angeles Lakers
- 2023–2024: Minnesota Timberwolves
- 2024: Detroit Pistons
- 2024: Manisa Basket
- 2025: Santurce Crabbers
- 2025–2026: Adelaide 36ers

Career highlights
- McDonald's All-American (2017)
- Stats at NBA.com
- Stats at Basketball Reference
Medals
Men's basketball
Representing the United States
FIBA U17 World Championship
| Gold medal – first place | 2016 Spain | National team |

Troy Randall Brown Jr. (born July 28, 1999) is an American professional basketball player who last played for the Adelaide 36ers of the Australian National Basketball League (NBL). He played one season of college basketball for the Oregon Ducks before being selected with the 15th overall pick by the Washington Wizards in the 2018 NBA draft.

== Early life ==
Brown's mother (track) and father (basketball) competed collegiately at Texas A&M University-Kingsville. His sister, Jada, also played basketball at the University of Kansas.

In his senior year of high school, Brown was named a 2017 McDonald's All-American.

=== Recruiting ===
Brown Jr. was considered one of the best players in the 2017 recruiting class by Scout.com, Rivals.com and ESPN. On November 7, 2016, he committed to playing with the Oregon Ducks. He was one of their top prospects going into his freshman season and continued to uphold this reputation all throughout his college career.

College recruiting
| Name | Hometown | School | Height | Weight | Commit date |
|---|---|---|---|---|---|
| Troy Brown Jr. SF | Las Vegas, NV | Centennial High School (NV) | 6 ft 7 in (2.01 m) | 210 lb (95 kg) | Nov 7, 2016 |
| Troy Brown Jr. SF | Recruit ratings: Rivals: 247Sports: ESPN: (93) | | | | |
Overall recruit ranking: Rivals: 13 247Sports: 13 ESPN: 15
Note: In many cases, Scout, Rivals, 247Sports, On3, and ESPN may conflict in their listings of height and weight.; In these cases, the average was taken. ESPN grades are on a 100-point scale.; Sources: "Oregon 2017 Basketball Commitments". Rivals.; "2017 Team Ranking". Rivals.

== College career ==
Brown made his collegiate debut on November 10, 2017, recording 18 points in a win against Coppin State University. Three days later, he recorded 17 points, 9 rebounds, and 4 assists in a win over Prairie View A&M University. Brown would get his first double-double of the season by recording 12 points and 10 rebounds in a win against Colorado State University on December 8. Three days later, he would record a season-high 12 rebounds to go with 10 points in a win against Texas Southern University. On December 13, Brown recorded a near triple-double with 10 points, 10 rebounds, and a season-high 9 assists in a win over Portland State University. On New Year's Eve, he would record a season-high 21 points in a win against the University of Colorado. He would later match that season-high with points scored on February 18, 2018, in their win against the University of Washington. Because of his immediate success with Oregon, after the end of his freshman season, Brown declared entry for the 2018 NBA draft.

In his lone season at Oregon, Brown averaged 11.3 points, 6.2 rebounds and 3.2 assists per game.

Brown appeared in 35 games for the Ducks, averaging 11.3 points, 6.2 rebounds and 3.2 assists in 31.2 minutes per game. Oregon's leading rebounder, Brown was also second on the team in assists and he shot 44.4 percent from the field, 29.1 percent from three and 74.3 percent from the foul line.

== Professional career ==
=== Washington Wizards (2018–2021) ===
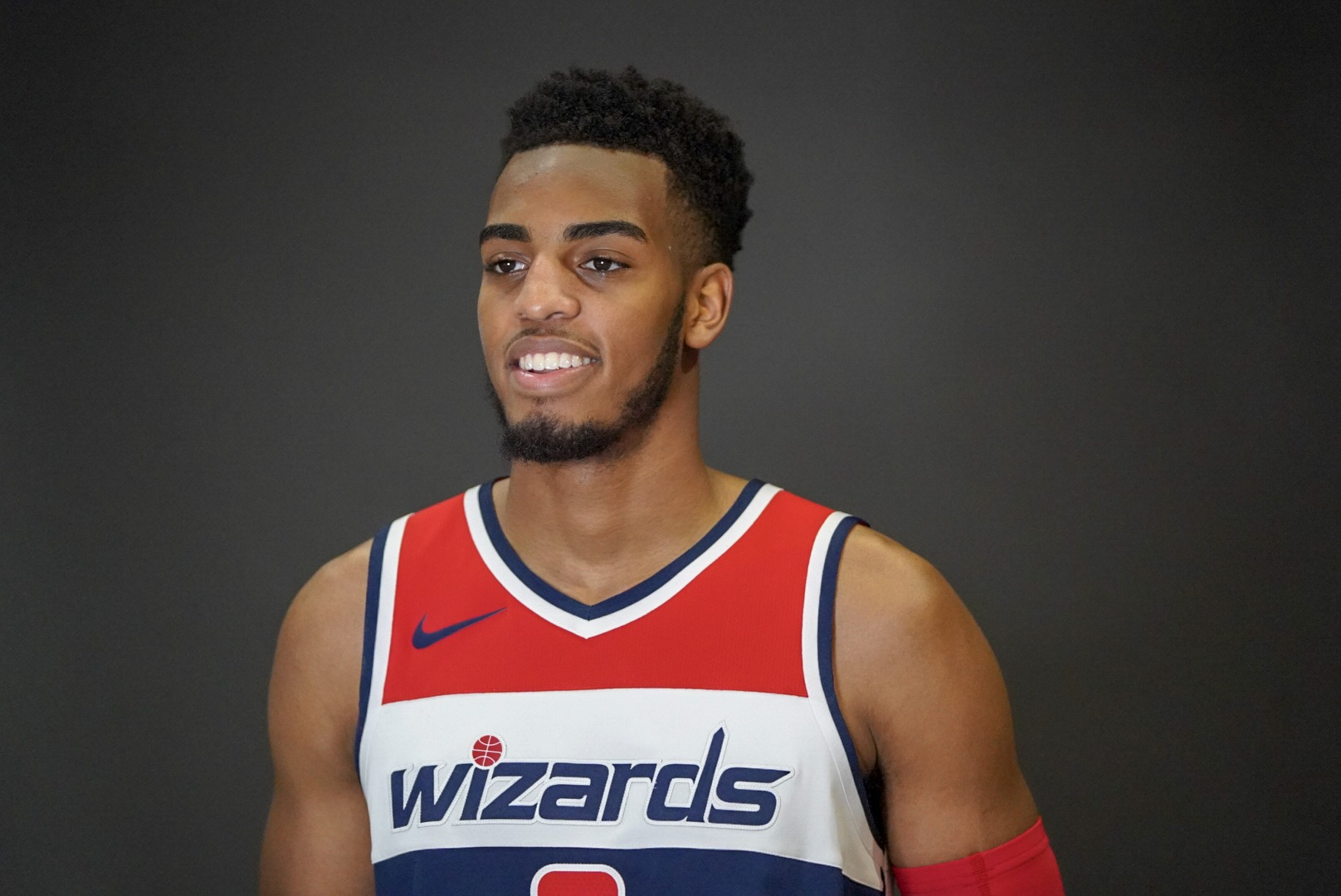
Brown in 2018

On June 21, 2018, Brown was selected with the 15th overall pick by the Washington Wizards in the 2018 NBA draft. On July 5, he signed his rookie scale contract with the Wizards. On October 24, Brown made his NBA debut, scoring four points in a 122–144 loss to the Golden State Warriors. On March 31, 2019, he logged a season-high 24 points, alongside seven rebounds, in a 95–90 win over the Denver Nuggets.

On December 23, 2019, Brown logged a career-high 26 points, alongside nine rebounds and seven assists, in a 121–115 win over the New York Knicks. On January 4, 2020, he grabbed a career-high 14 rebounds in a 128–114 win over the Denver Nuggets.

=== Chicago Bulls (2021–2022) ===
On March 25, 2021, Brown was traded to the Chicago Bulls in a three-team trade involving the Boston Celtics.

On January 11, 2022, Brown recorded a career-high six steals, alongside seven points, seven rebounds and five assists, in a 133–87 win over the Detroit Pistons. On April 10, he logged a season-high 17 points, alongside 11 rebounds, four assists and two steals, in a 124–120 win over the Minnesota Timberwolves.

=== Los Angeles Lakers (2022–2023) ===
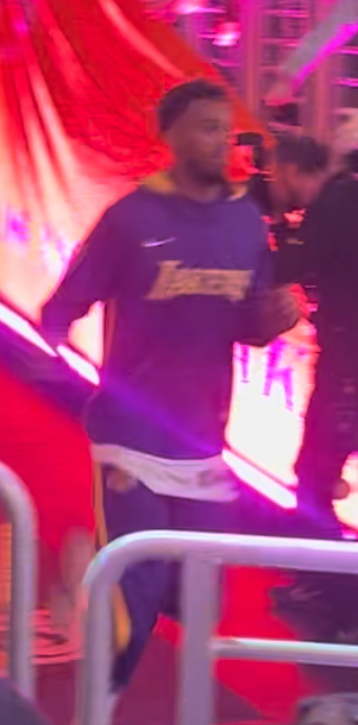
Brown in 2023

On July 1, 2022, Brown signed with the Los Angeles Lakers.

=== Minnesota Timberwolves (2023–2024) ===
On July 9, 2023, Brown signed with the Minnesota Timberwolves.

=== Detroit Pistons (2024) ===
On February 7, 2024, Brown was traded, alongside Shake Milton and a 2030 second-round pick, in exchange for Monté Morris. On June 29, he was waived by the Pistons.

=== Manisa Basket (2024) ===
On October 11, 2024, Brown signed with Manisa Basket of the Basketbol Süper Ligi (BSL).

=== Santurce Crabbers (2025) ===
On February 7, 2025, Brown signed with the Santurce Crabbers of the Baloncesto Superior Nacional (BSN).

=== Adelaide 36ers (2025–2026) ===
On November 14, 2025, Brown signed with the Adelaide 36ers of the Australian National Basketball League (NBL) for the rest of the 2025–26 season. He parted ways with the 36ers on January 12, 2026, due to personal reasons.

== National team career ==
Brown won a gold medal with USA Basketball at the 2016 FIBA Under-17 World Championship.

== Career statistics ==
Legend
| GP | Games played | GS | Games started | MPG | Minutes per game |
| FG% | Field goal percentage | 3P% | 3-point field goal percentage | FT% | Free throw percentage |
| RPG | Rebounds per game | APG | Assists per game | SPG | Steals per game |
| BPG | Blocks per game | PPG | Points per game | **Bold** | Career high |

=== NBA ===
==== Regular season ====
| Year | Team | GP | GS | MPG | FG% | 3P% | FT% | RPG | APG | SPG | BPG | PPG |
|---|---|---|---|---|---|---|---|---|---|---|---|---|
| 2018–19 | Washington | 52 | 10 | 14.0 | .415 | .319 | .681 | 2.8 | 1.5 | .4 | .1 | 4.8 |
| 2019–20 | Washington | 69 | 22 | **25.8** | .439 | .341 | .784 | **5.6** | **2.6** | **1.2** | .1 | **10.4** |
| 2020–21 | Washington | 21 | 0 | 13.7 | .371 | .304 | .667 | 2.9 | .9 | .1 | **.2** | 4.3 |
| 2020–21 | Chicago | 13 | 0 | 18.2 | **.527** | .333 | .833 | 3.4 | .8 | .5 | **.2** | 5.5 |
| 2021–22 | Chicago | 66 | 7 | 16.0 | .419 | .353 | .769 | 3.1 | 1.0 | .5 | .1 | 4.3 |
| 2022–23 | L.A. Lakers | **76** | **45** | 24.5 | .430 | **.381** | **.872** | 4.1 | 1.3 | .8 | **.2** | 7.1 |
| 2023–24 | Minnesota | 37 | 3 | 11.1 | .441 | .369 | .864 | 1.9 | .9 | .2 | .1 | 4.2 |
| 2023–24 | Detroit | 22 | 12 | 18.9 | .296 | .281 | .867 | 3.3 | 1.1 | .7 | .0 | 4.2 |
| Career | | 356 | 99 | 19.0 | .423 | .351 | .783 | 3.6 | 1.4 | .7 | .1 | 6.2 |

==== Playoffs ====
| Year | Team | GP | GS | MPG | FG% | 3P% | FT% | RPG | APG | SPG | BPG | PPG |
|---|---|---|---|---|---|---|---|---|---|---|---|---|
| 2022 | Chicago | 3 | 0 | **12.3** | .294 | **.182** | — | **2.7** | **1.0** | **.7** | .0 | **4.0** |
| 2023 | L.A. Lakers | **12** | 0 | 10.3 | **.357** | .133 | — | 2.0 | .9 | .2 | **.1** | 1.8 |
| Career | | 15 | 0 | 10.7 | .333 | .154 | — | 2.1 | .9 | .3 | .1 | 2.3 |

=== College ===
| Year | Team | GP | GS | MPG | FG% | 3P% | FT% | RPG | APG | SPG | BPG | PPG |
|---|---|---|---|---|---|---|---|---|---|---|---|---|
| 2017–18 | Oregon | 35 | 35 | 31.2 | .444 | .291 | .743 | 6.2 | 3.2 | 1.6 | .2 | 11.3 |
