= Admiral Schofield =

American basketball player (born 1997)

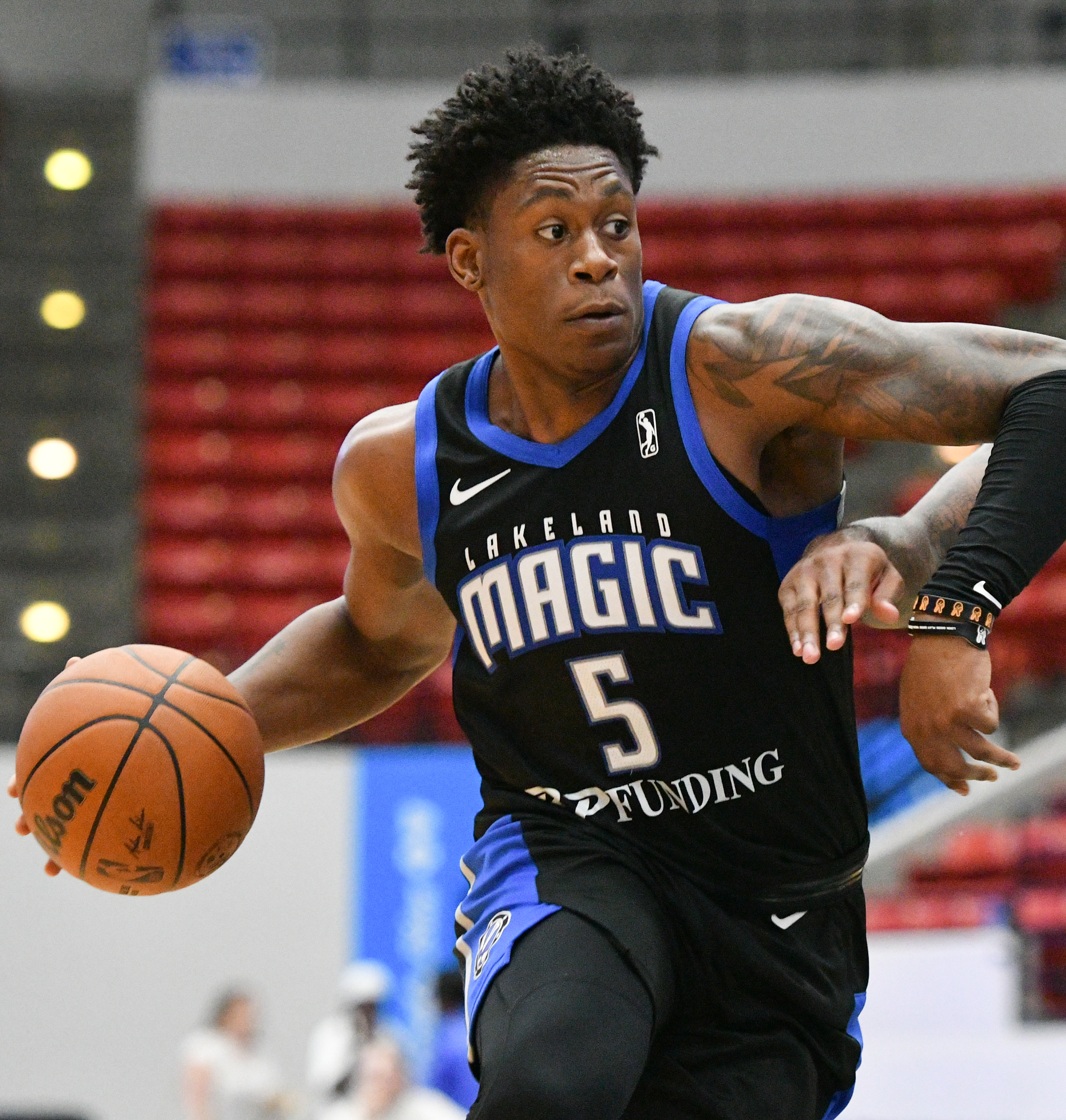
- Schofield with the Lakeland Magic in 2021

Free agent
- Position: Small forward / power forward

Personal information
- Born: March 30, 1997 (age 29) London, England
- Listed height: 6 ft 6 in (1.98 m)
- Listed weight: 240 lb (109 kg)

Career information
- High school: Zion-Benton Township (Zion, Illinois)
- College: Tennessee (2015–2019)
- NBA draft: 2019: 2nd round, 42nd overall pick
- Drafted by: Philadelphia 76ers
- Playing career: 2019–present

Career history
- 2019–2020: Washington Wizards
- 2019–2020: →Capital City Go-Go
- 2021: Greensboro Swarm
- 2021: Lakeland Magic
- 2021–2024: Orlando Magic
- 2022–2023: →Lakeland Magic
- 2024: LDLC ASVEL
- 2025–2026: Cairns Taipans

Career highlights
- AP Honorable Mention All-American (2019); First-team All-SEC (2019); Second-team All-SEC (2018)
- Stats at NBA.com
- Stats at Basketball Reference

Admiral Donovhan Schofield (born March 30, 1997) is an American professional basketball player who last played for the Cairns Taipans of the National Basketball League (NBL). He played college basketball for the Tennessee Volunteers.

== Early life ==
Schofield, the son of Anthony and Dawn Schofield, was born at St Mary's Hospital in London. His father served in the United States Navy which required his family to travel. His brother O'Brien Schofield is a linebacker who won a Super Bowl with the Seattle Seahawks. He has another brother General and a sister Octavia; one other brother, Joshua, drowned in Lake Michigan in 2007.

Schofield moved with his family to Illinois as a one-year-old. Schofield attended Zion-Benton High School where he played center. In his final high school game, he recorded 23 points with 18 rebounds against Stevenson in the Class 4A regional championship. In AAU play, he competed for Dickey Simpkins' Team NLP. Donnie Tyndall recruited him to Tennessee, but Schofield decided to stay after Tyndall was fired.

== College career ==
Schofield averaged 7.6 points and 4.0 rebounds per game as a freshman. He missed three games as a sophomore while he was suspended for violating team rules. He only scored 3.5 points per game in nonconference play, but began to break out during the conference season and had his first double-double of 18 points and 10 rebounds in a loss to Florida. As a sophomore at Tennessee, Schofield averaged 8.2 points and 4.4 rebounds per game.

Schofield was named to the SEC All-Tournament Team as a junior due to a 22-point effort in the SEC Title game loss to Kentucky. As a junior, Schofield averaged 13.9 points and 6.5 rebounds per game. He helped Tennessee to a 26–9 record and the second round of the NCAA tournament. In the first round win over Wright State, Schofield had 15 points and 12 rebounds. Schofield was named to the Second Team All-SEC. Following the season, he declared for the 2018 NBA draft but did not hire an agent, thus leaving open the possibility of returning to the Volunteers. Schofield announced his return to Tennessee on May 29.

As a senior, Schofield averaged 16.5 points and 6.1 rebounds per game. He was named to the First Team All-SEC. He led Tennessee to a 31–6 record and the Sweet 16 of the NCAA tournament. In his final career game, a 99–94 overtime loss to Purdue, Schofield finished with 21 points.

== Professional career ==
=== Washington Wizards (2019–2020) ===
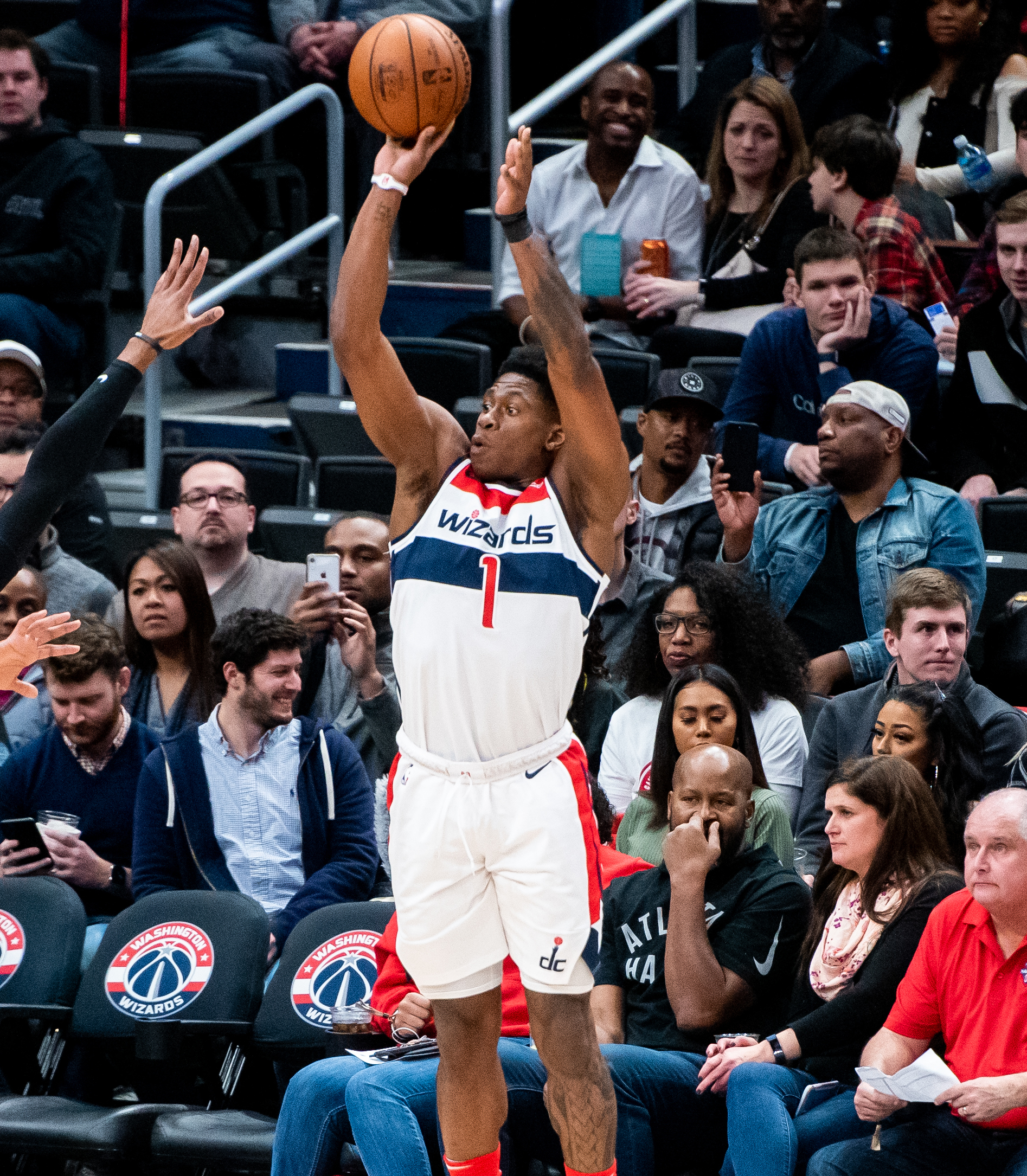
Schofield in 2020

Schofield was selected in the second round of the 2019 NBA draft by the Philadelphia 76ers, then immediately traded to the Washington Wizards. He signed a three-year, $4.3 million contract with the Wizards in July. Schofield became a pitchman for Hulu Sports in August. Schofield was assigned to the NBA G League team the Capital City Go-Go. On December 4, he became the first player in the Wizards organization to play a game for the Go-Go and Wizards in the same day. On January 8, 2020, Schofield had 18 points, six rebounds and two assists off the bench in a 123–89 loss to the Orlando Magic. Prior to the stoppage of the NBA season, Schofield played 27 games for the Wizards, averaging 3.1 points and 1.3 rebounds in 10.9 minutes per game, shooting 40.0 percent from the floor. In the G League, he started all 33 games for the Go-Go, averaging 16.0 points, 5.5 rebounds and 2.0 assists in 30.9 minutes per game.

=== Greensboro Swarm (2021) ===
On November 19, 2020, Schofield was traded to the Oklahoma City Thunder along with Vít Krejčí for Cassius Winston and a 2024 second-round pick. However, he was waived by the Thunder at the end of the preseason. On January 11, 2021, he was selected by the Greensboro Swarm with the first overall pick of the NBA G League draft. In 14 games, he averaged 10.1 points, 5.7 rebounds and 2.1 assists in 26.2 minutes per game.

=== Lakeland Magic (2021) ===
In August 2021, Schofield joined the Atlanta Hawks for the 2021 NBA Summer League, recording no points on 0-3 shooting, 7 rebounds and 4 assists in 25 minutes at his debut, a 85–83 loss against the Boston Celtics. On September 21, 2021, he signed with the Orlando Magic, but was waived at the end of training camp. On October 28, he joined the Lakeland Magic and played 12 games, averaging 14.4 points, 7.2 rebounds and 1.8 assists in 33.0 minutes per game.

=== Orlando / Lakeland Magic (2021–2024) ===
On December 17, 2021, Schofield signed a 10-day contract with the Orlando Magic. He signed a second 10-day contract with the team on December 27. On January 6, 2022, he was signed to a two-way contract. On April 9, Schofield was fined $20,000 by the NBA for his role in an on-court altercation during a game against the Charlotte Hornets two days later.

On July 22, 2022, Schofield signed another two-way contract with the Magic. On December 29, he was suspended by the NBA for one game without pay due to coming off the bench during an altercation in a game against the Detroit Pistons the day before. On February 21, 2023, the Magic converted Schofield's deal to a standard NBA contract.

On July 20, 2023, Schofield signed another two-way contract with Orlando.

=== LDLC ASVEL (2024) ===
On June 28, 2024, Schofield signed with LDLC ASVEL of the LNB Élite. He left in November 2024.

=== Cairns Taipans (2025–2026) ===
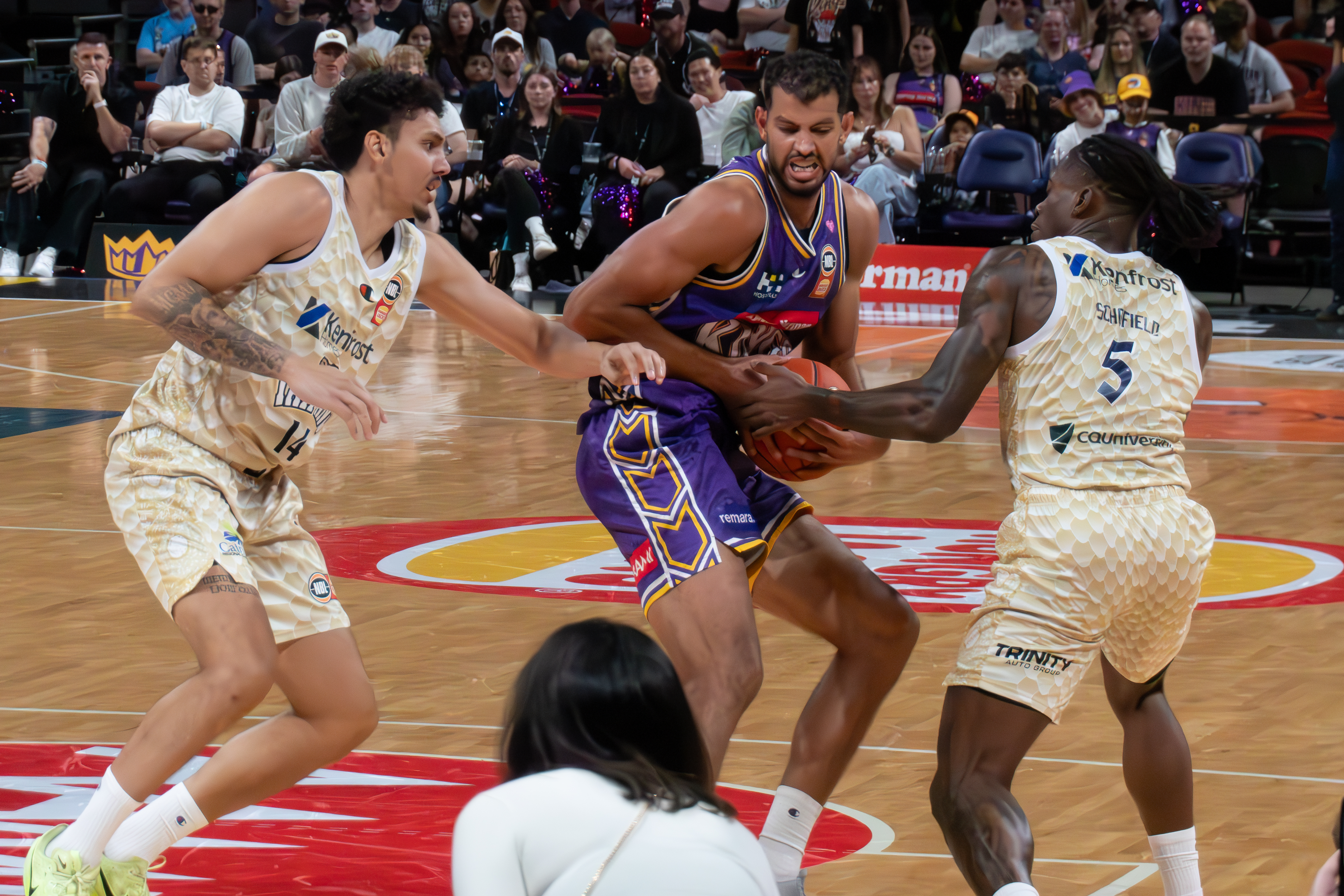
Schofield (right) and Cairns Taipans teammate Kyrin Galloway guard Tim Soares of the Sydney Kings in 2025

On August 13, 2025, Schofield signed with the Cairns Taipans of the National Basketball League (NBL) for the 2025–26 season.

== Career statistics ==
Legend
| GP | Games played | GS | Games started | MPG | Minutes per game |
| FG% | Field goal percentage | 3P% | 3-point field goal percentage | FT% | Free throw percentage |
| RPG | Rebounds per game | APG | Assists per game | SPG | Steals per game |
| BPG | Blocks per game | PPG | Points per game | **Bold** | Career high |

=== NBA ===
==== Regular season ====
| Year | Team | GP | GS | MPG | FG% | 3P% | FT% | RPG | APG | SPG | BPG | PPG |
|---|---|---|---|---|---|---|---|---|---|---|---|---|
| 2019–20 | Washington | 33 | **2** | 11.2 | .380 | .311 | .667 | 1.4 | .5 | **.2** | **.1** | 3.0 |
| 2021–22 | Orlando | **38** | 1 | **12.3** | .419 | .329 | .800 | **2.3** | .7 | .1 | **.1** | 3.8 |
| 2022–23 | Orlando | 37 | 0 | 12.2 | **.451** | .324 | **.913** | 1.7 | **.8** | **.2** | **.1** | **4.2** |
| 2023–24 | Orlando | 23 | 0 | 3.7 | .385 | **.375** | .000 | .7 | .3 | .0 | .0 | 1.1 |
| Career | | 131 | 3 | 10.5 | .417 | .326 | .782 | 1.6 | .6 | .2 | .1 | 3.3 |

=== College ===
| Year | Team | GP | GS | MPG | FG% | 3P% | FT% | RPG | APG | SPG | BPG | PPG |
|---|---|---|---|---|---|---|---|---|---|---|---|---|
| 2015–16 | Tennessee | 32 | 22 | 18.7 | .444 | .301 | **.897** | 4.0 | .9 | .4 | .3 | 7.6 |
| 2016–17 | Tennessee | 28 | 2 | 19.0 | .453 | .389 | .779 | 4.4 | .8 | .3 | .2 | 8.2 |
| 2017–18 | Tennessee | 35 | 34 | 28.1 | .447 | .395 | .756 | **6.4** | 1.5 | **1.0** | .4 | 13.9 |
| 2018–19 | Tennessee | **37** | **37** | **31.8** | **.474** | **.418** | .698 | 6.1 | **2.0** | .9 | **.5** | **16.5** |
| Career | | 132 | 95 | 24.9 | .458 | .387 | .763 | 5.3 | 1.3 | .7 | .4 | 11.9 |
