= Cottonwood Mall (Albuquerque, New Mexico) =

Coordinates: 35.198°N 106.658°W

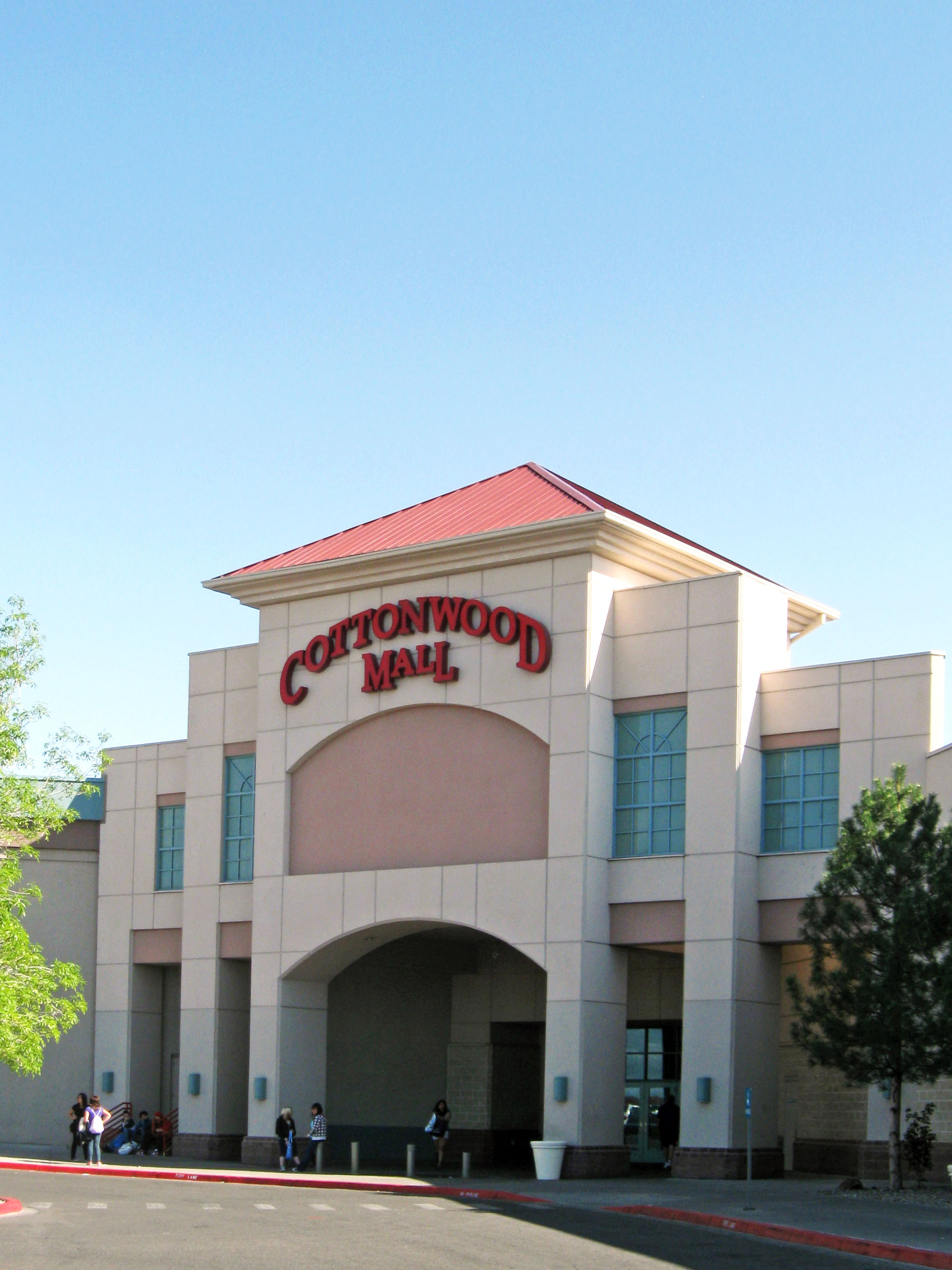
- Location: Albuquerque, New Mexico, United States
- Opened: July 1996; 30 years ago
- Developer: Simon DeBartolo Group
- Manager: Spinoso Real Estate Group
- Num. of stores: 130+
- Num. of anchor tenants: 10 (9 open, 1 vacant)
- Floor area: 1,041,680 sq ft (96,775 m^{2}).
- Floors: 2
- Website: cottonwoodmall.com

Cottonwood Mall is a shopping mall located in Albuquerque, New Mexico, United States. The mall's anchor stores are Hobby Lobby, Mor Furniture, JCPenney, Dillard's, Regal Cinemas, Conn's, Kids Empire Albuquerque, and HomeLife Furniture. There is 1 vacant anchor store that was once Sears. The mall is the second largest mall in the state of New Mexico, after Coronado Center, with a gross leasable area of 1,041,680 square feet (96,775 m^{2}); the mall's food court features a diorama ceiling depicting the city of Albuquerque. The mall is also a regular filming location on several productions, including Better Call Saul and Daybreak. It features over 100 stores and restaurants, as well as a Regal Cinemas (formerly United Artists) Theater. Cottonwood Mall was managed by Washington Prime Group. As of March 2022, the mall is leased and managed by court-appointed receiver “Spinoso Real Estate Group”. The mall's parking area has several dining establishments, including BJ's Restaurant & Brewery, Buffalo Wild Wings, Red Robin, Texas Roadhouse, and New Mexican cuisine restaurants like Garduños, Los Cuates, and Range Cafe.

In May 2014, as part of Simon Property Group's spinoff of smaller malls, ownership of the mall was transferred to Simon spinoff Washington Prime Group, although Simon was retained as the mall's manager until early 2016. Washington Prime would later become WP Glimcher, and take over management of the mall. However in that same year WP Glimcher was renamed back to Washington Prime Group. In June 2021, Washington Prime Group filed for Chapter 11 bankruptcy protection. At the time, the real estate company owned 100 malls — including Cottonwood Mall. According to loan-servicer notes, Washington Prime at that point deemed Cottonwood Mall a "non- core" asset and requested the court appoint a receiver. In August 2021, Washington Prime Group indicated it would not seek to retain ownership of Cottonwood Mall, according to financial filings.

Former tenants include Sega City amusement arcade, Sears which was prior a Montgomery Ward, and Macy's which was once a Foley's, and a Mervyn's. Hobby Lobby, Conn's, and Mor Furniture have since replaced Macy's and Mervyns. Sega City was converted into a second story for Regal Cinemas.

== History ==
Cottonwood Mall was built on part of an 89,000-acre (360 km^{2}) parcel of land given by King Philip IV of Spain in 1710 to Francisco Montes Vigil, who later sold the land, which included only some farmland along the Rio Grande, to Captain Juan Gonzales of the Spanish Army. The land grant is known as the "Alameda Land Grant" (alameda means "cottonwood grove" in Spanish). In 1929, 20,500 acres were purchased by Albert F. Black who established the Seven Bar Ranch. The Black family built an adobe home and in 1947 a small airport which was known as the Seven Bar Airport, and later the Alameda Airport. Surrounded by growing urban areas, the Black family sold off much of the remaining ranch for the development of new residential subdivisions. The Alameda Airport remained in operation until 1986. Cottonwood Mall opened in 1996 on the site of the airport.

When Cottonwood Mall opened in July 1996, it was the first regional mall to open in Albuquerque in thirty years. To this day, and with the exception of a new mall under construction in the South Valley, it is the newest completed enclosed shopping mall in New Mexico. Original anchors included Dillard's, Foley's, JCPenney, Mervyn's, and Montgomery Ward. The Montgomery Ward store closed due to bankruptcy, and it was replaced by Sears, and following the closure of Mervyns in 2008 due to liquidation, its lower level became Conn's in 2013. Foley's became Macy's in 2006 as part of Federated Department Stores (now Macy's inc) consolidating May's Department Stores brands which also includes Foley's, However, Macy's closed in 2017.

In 1999, Cottonwood Mall was one of three New Mexico malls (with the two others being Winrock Center and Coronado Center) involved in a federal lawsuit regarding free speech. The malls had their rights of activity regulation challenged after protesters attempted to hand out leaflets at the malls. The case was dismissed. The 1972 case Lloyd Corp. v. Tanner states that shopping malls may limit speech activities (such as distribution of pamphlets) on premises.

On May 31, 2018, it was announced that Sears would be closing as part of a plan to close 72 stores nationwide. The store closed in September 2018. The former Macy's was partially converted to Hobby Lobby in 2018. HomeLife Furniture and Mor Furniture took the rest of the space in 2019.

== Food court ==
The mall's food court features a diorama of Albuquerque, the Rio Grande, Sandia Mountains, West Mesa, and the mall itself. The chain restaurants in the food court include a Burger King, Charleys Philly Steaks, Keva Juice, and Potato Corner. Other restaurants include Fuji Japan (formerly Edo Japan), Paleta Bar, and Sushi Roller.

== Book Co-Op ==
From Thanksgiving Day to New Year's Day every year, Cottonwood Mall is also home to New Mexico Book Co-Op, a locally owned bookstore which sells only local books and products; such books and products are ordinarily not found in traditional bookstores.
