= Tommy Sheppard (basketball) =

American basketball executive (born 1969)

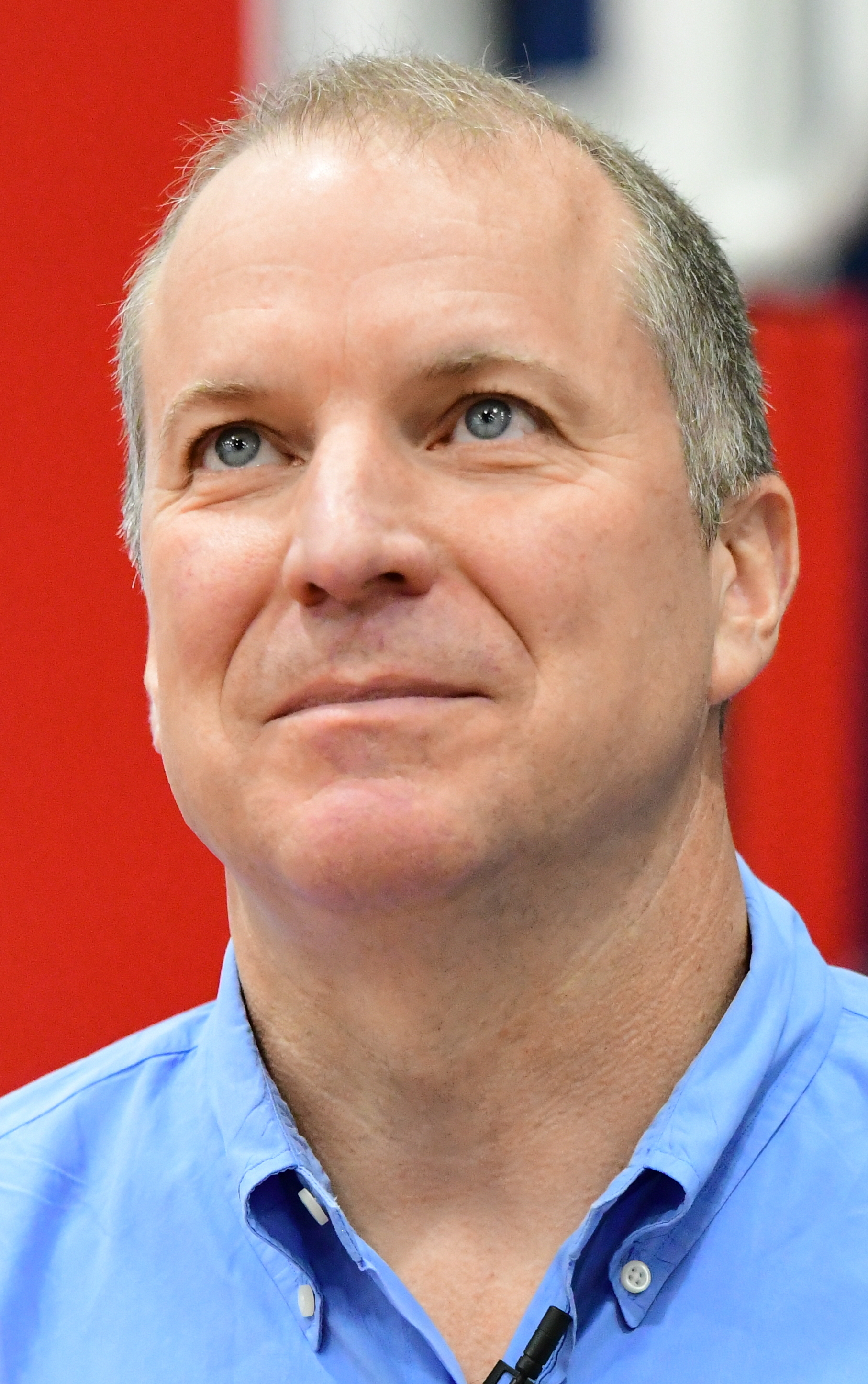
- Sheppard in 2019

Personal information
- Born: May 23, 1969 (age 57) Albuquerque, New Mexico, U.S.

Career information
- High school: St. Pius X (Albuquerque)
- College: New Mexico State

Thomas F. Sheppard (born May 23, 1969) is an American basketball executive. A native of New Mexico, he attended New Mexico State University and played for their football team before graduating in 1991. Sheppard joined the public relations department of the National Basketball Association's (NBA) Denver Nuggets in 1994. He later joined the NBA's Washington Wizards as an assistant executive under general manager Ernie Grunfeld in 2003, and served as their general manager and team president from 2019 to 2023.

== Early life and career ==
Sheppard was born in Albuquerque, New Mexico, where he attended St. Pius X High School. Sheppard attended New Mexico State University, where he played three years for the New Mexico State Aggies football team, before graduating in 1991. Sheppard started his career in sports management, when he accepted a job with the Aggies as a graduate assistant to the sports information director.

Sheppard would later move to the University of Nevada-Las Vegas, where he served as the sports information director for the UNLV Rebels for three seasons.

== Executive career ==
=== Denver Nuggets ===
Sheppard was hired by the Denver Nuggets in 1994 as the team's senior director of team services and player relations. Sheppard was responsible for overseeing the team's public relations department, in addition to scouting players in the high school, college and international ranks.

=== Washington Wizards ===
Sheppard was hired by the Wizards in 2003, serving as the team's vice-president of basketball operations under the newly hired president and general manager Ernie Grunfeld.

Sheppard served in various capacities with the franchise and was responsible for the team's rebuilding efforts, which saw the Wizards move on from Gilbert Arenas and placing a greater emphasis on drafting and developing players. Sheppard was considered influential in the team's decision to build around both John Wall and Bradley Beal.

Sheppard was appointed the interim general manager of the Wizards following Grunfeld's dismissal on April 2, 2019. He was later named to the position full-time on July 19, 2019. In November 2021, he signed a multi-year contract extension and was also given the title of team president. He was fired on April 19, 2023, after the Wizards had missed the playoffs for two consecutive years.

== Personal life ==
Sheppard has served as an adjunct professor of sports management at Georgetown University.
