= Coronado Center =

Coordinates: 35°06′25.5″N 106°34′21″W

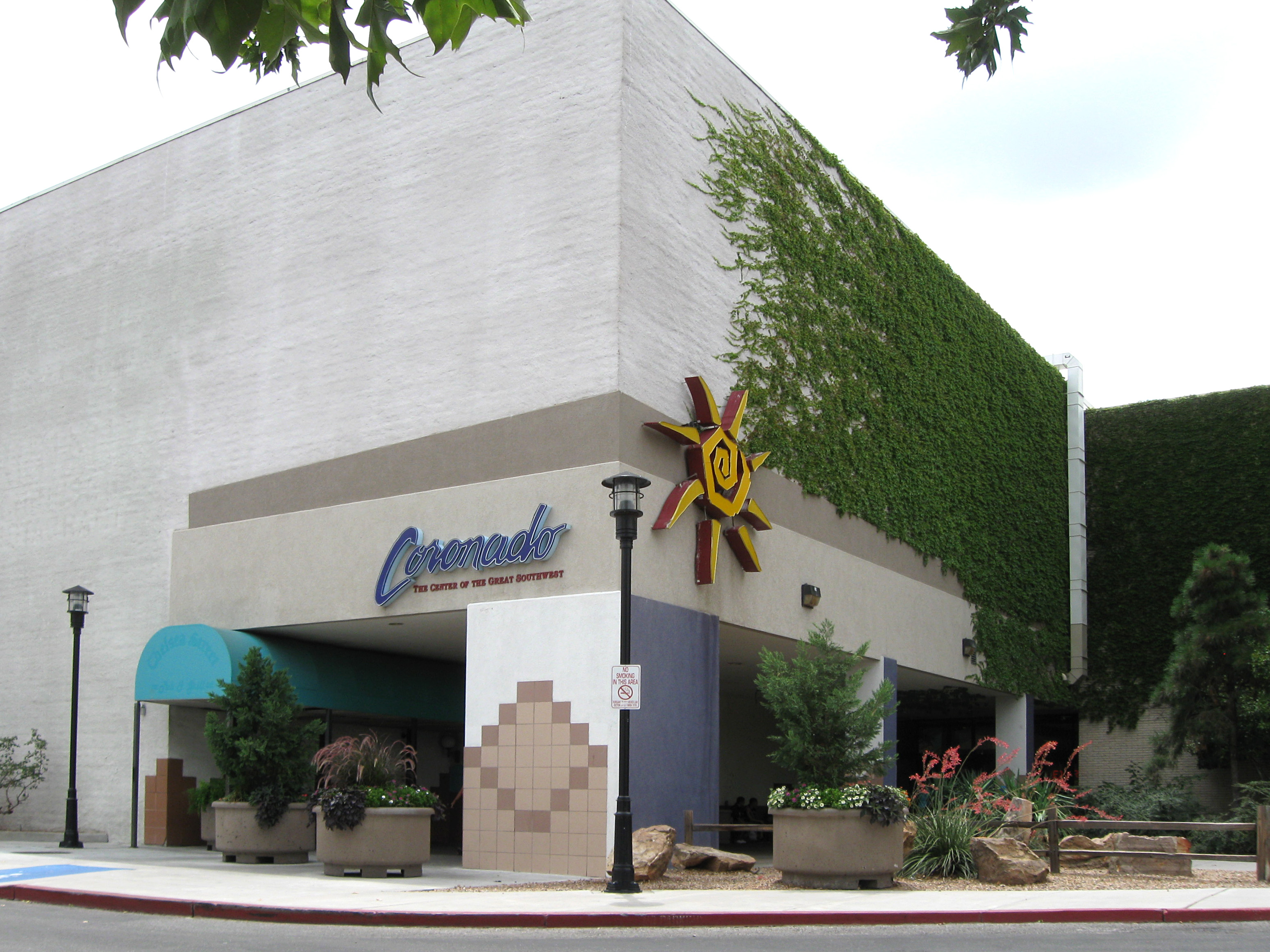
- Northwest entrance
- Location: Albuquerque, New Mexico, United States
- Opened: March 1965; 61 years ago
- Developer: Homart Development Company
- Manager: GGP
- Owner: GGP
- Architect: Loebl, Schlossman & Bennett
- Num. of stores: 150
- Num. of anchor tenants: 6 (4 open, 2 vacant)
- Floor area: 1,154,000 square feet (107,200 m^{2})
- Floors: 1-2
- Parking: 5,000 spaces
- Website: www.coronadocenter.com/en.html

Coronado Center is a shopping mall in Albuquerque, New Mexico, United States. Built in 1965 by the Homart Development Company, a defunct real-estate division of the department store Sears, the mall has undergone several renovations and expansions in its history which have led to it becoming the largest building by area in New Mexico. Its anchor stores include Macy's, J. C. Penney, Dick's Sporting Goods, Round One Entertainment, with two vacancies formerly occupied by Sears and Kohl's. Other major tenants include Barnes & Noble, H&M, Forever 21, The Container Store, The Cheesecake Factory, and Boot Barn. The mall features over 150 stores, including a food court, and is operated by GGP, a subsidiary of Brookfield Properties.

== Background ==
Coronado Center opened in March 1965 as an open-air mall, and was developed by Homart Development Company, the mall-building subsidiary of Sears. It was remodeled in 1975-1976 (when it became an enclosed mall), 1984, 1992, and 1995.

=== History ===
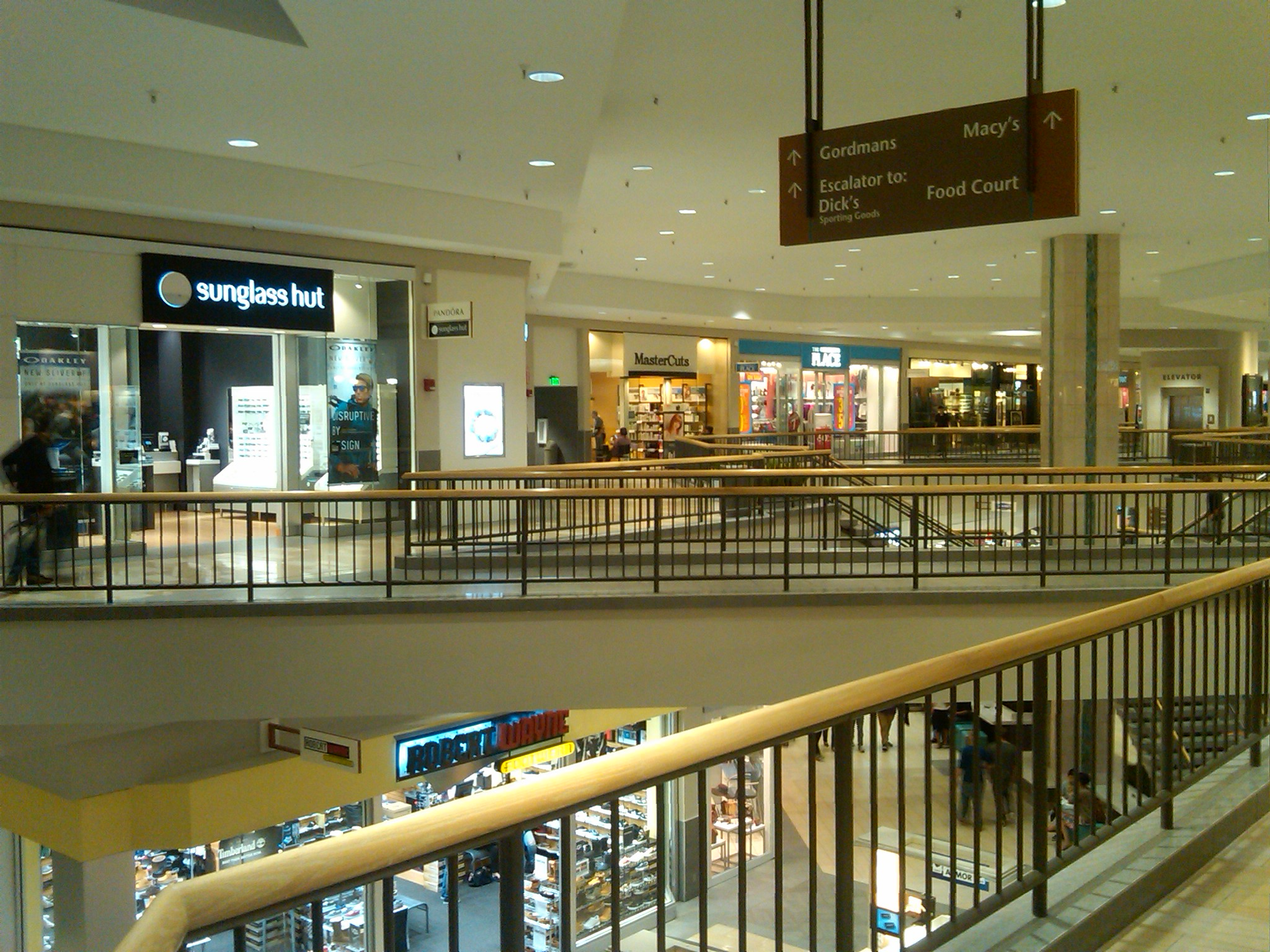
Inside Coronado Center, 2014

When Coronado Center first opened in 1965, the mall's original anchor tenants included Sears and Rhodes Brothers. Sears was the first store to open, opening in September 1964. Rhodes Brothers opened in October 1965. The mall and its anchors were designed by a group of architects consisting of Lobel, Schlossman & Bennett of Chicago, George L. Dahl of Dallas for Sears and Wood & Sibeck of Dallas with Chaix & Johnson of Los Angeles for Rhodes. George A Rutherford, Albuquerque was general contractor. In 1974, Rhodes Brothers was re-branded as Liberty House. In the mall's 1975-1976 expansion, two new anchor stores (Goldwater's and The Broadway) were added. The new stores were designed by Chaix & Johnson for Goldwater's and Chaix, Pujdak, Bielski, Takeuchi, Daggett Associated Architects & Planers for The Broadway, with George A. Rutherford Inc. and Bradbury & Stamm Construction Co. serving as general contractors for Goldwater's and The Broadway respectively. In 1984 a fifth anchor store (Sanger-Harris) was added. In the late 1970s, Liberty House closed and was replaced by Mervyn's shortly afterward. Goldwater's re-branded as May D&F in 1989. Sanger-Harris was re-branded as Foley's in 1987, but in 1988, Foley's closed this location.

In 1990, JCPenney opened at the former Sanger-Harris/Foley's store area. May D&F was re-branded as Foley's in 1993, signifying Foley's return to the mall. The Broadway was re-branded as Macy's in 1996.

In 2006, Foley's was rebranded as Macy's, and Macy's vacated the former The Broadway store area, which has now been taken over by Gordmans upstairs and Dick's Sporting Goods downstairs. Mervyn's closed all stores due to bankruptcy in 2008, and the store area was remodeled for Kohl's, which opened in 2010.

In 2014, parts of the mall were remodeled in recognition of the 50th anniversary of the mall and the opening of the popular European clothing retailer H&M.

In the following years, the shopping center has seen the addition of more popular food and entertainment enterprises, including California-based eateries such as The Cheesecake Factory and Blaze Pizza. Other restaurants and sweets shops include Albuquerque-based Boba Tea Company, Jimmy John's, Cinnabon, Lolli and Pops, Sees Candies, Seasons 52 Grill, and Fuddruckers.

In 2017, Dallas-based specialty retail chain The Container Store opened its doors at Coronado Center. Also in 2017, Gordmans closed its store after filing for Chapter 11 bankruptcy. The former Gordmans is now Round 1.

On October 15, 2018, it was announced that Sears would be closing as part of a plan to close 142 stores nationwide.

In 2019, the Albuquerque location of the hipster clothing retailer Urban Outfitters left their previous Nob Hill premises to a new space on the main upper level of the shopping center.

Other notable businesses include Barnes & Noble, T-Mobile, Wells Fargo, Bank of America, Yankee Candle, Escape the Room, The Buckle, Express, Bath & Body Works, Hollister Co., Hot Topic, American Eagle Outfitters, Sephora, and Forever 21.

In September 2023, it was announced that Kohl's would shutter.

On November 24, 2023, a gunshot was heard outside of the mall after an altercation between two teenage boys. Albuquerque Police Department was alerted and investigated the scene. They determined that there were no injuries, and proceeded to evacuate the building. After a short investigation, 14 year old Isaiah Montoya was identified and charged as the suspect.

=== Legal Issues ===
In 1999, Coronado Center was among three New Mexico shopping malls (the two others being Winrock Town Center and Cottonwood Mall) involved in a free speech lawsuit. Their policies on activity regulation were challenged by the SouthWest Organizing Project and ACLU after protesters attempted to hand out leaflets at the malls. This case was dismissed. The 1972 case Lloyd Corp. v. Tanner states that shopping malls may limit speech activities (such as distribution of pamphlets) on premises.
