= Winrock Town Center =

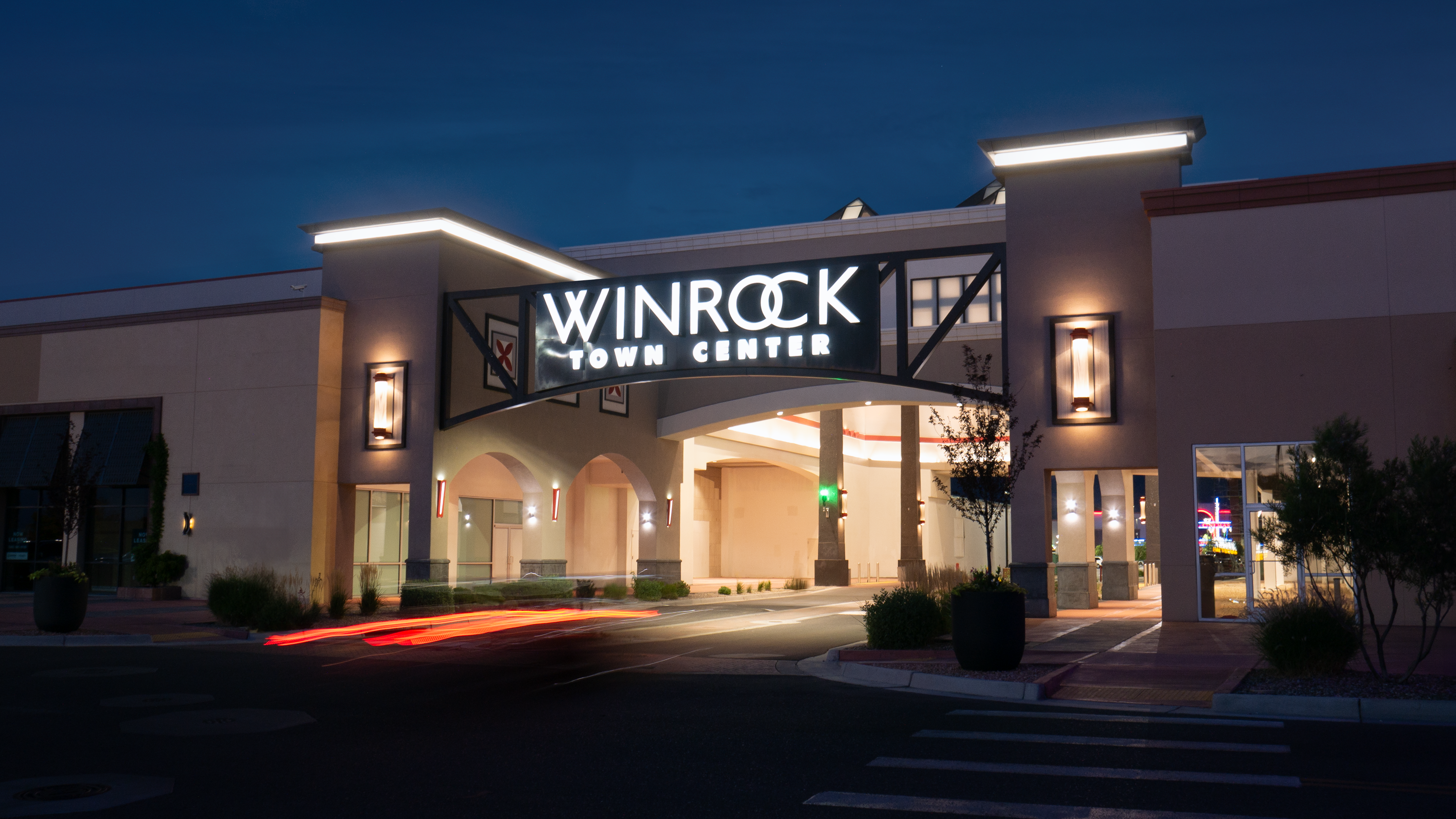
- Main entrance in Albuquerque, NM circa 2024
- Location: Albuquerque, New Mexico, United States
- Coordinates: 35°5′54″N 106°33′52″W
- Opened: March 1, 1961 (original indoor mall), 2020 (outdoor shopping center)
- Closed: 2016 (original indoor mall)(outdoor shopping center was still open)
- Previous names: Winrock Center
- Developer: Winthrop Rockefeller and the University of New Mexico
- Manager: Goodman Realty Group
- Owner: Winrock Partners, LLC
- Architect: Victor Gruen
- Num. of stores: 40 (2025)
- Website: winrocktowncenter.com

Winrock Town Center is a mixed-use development located in Albuquerque, New Mexico, United States. The center spans approximately 740,000 square feet (68,748 m^{2}) of retail, medical, wellness, entertainment, and office space. The property also features a 2.5-acre park with an amphitheater, water feature, playground, event lawn, markets, and community programs. The town center is located on the site of the original Winrock Center, developed by Winthrop Rockefeller and designed by Victor Gruen, which opened in 1961 as the first regional shopping mall in New Mexico.

== Pre-Winrock history (1920–1961) ==
In June 1920, the University of New Mexico purchased a 480-acre (190 ha) lot on what was then known as Albuquerque's East Mesa. The original intent UNM had with purchasing this lot was to transform it into a garden to produce vegetables for residential students. However, this idea was scrapped and the lot was left empty.

About three decades later, the University of New Mexico began to sell off plots of its East Mesa site to residential developers, with the first 160 acres (65 ha) going to Ed Snow in 1953 and another 160 acres (65 ha) to Dale Bellemah in 1956. This paved the way for new subdivisions and a new large population movement to this new part of Albuquerque. Soon enough, this would result in the need for the establishment of a retail area. This led to a 1958 meeting between then-UNM President Tom Popejoy and Winthrop Rockefeller, where they negotiated building a new regional shopping mall to be built on some of the last plots of UNM's East Mesa land.

== Winrock Center (1961–2016) ==
Winrock Center opened on March 1, 1961, on a 71-acre (29 ha) lot near the planned Coronado Freeway. The $10 million project was a joint venture between the University of New Mexico, which owned the land, and soon-to-be Arkansas governor Winthrop Rockefeller, who was also responsible for construction of the Bank of New Mexico Building around the same time. Architect Victor Gruen, who was a refugee from Nazi-occupied Austria, designed the mall. Winrock was New Mexico's first regional shopping center and was viewed as a symbol of progress and modernity, attracting around 30,000 visitors on its first day of operation. The original tenants included Montgomery Ward, JCPenney, S.S. Kresge, and Safeway, with a Fedway store opening shortly afterward. Fox Winrock Theater, a freestanding movie theater off of Indian School Road, and an attached motor hotel opened in 1963.

In March 1965, the rival Coronado Center was dedicated a short distance away. However, Winrock remained profitable for many years. Dillard's established their first store there in late 1971, when they rebranded the existing Fedway location. Soon after, a new store was built as a replacement. In 1971, Winrock was featured in the American International Pictures release Bunny O'Hare, which starred Bette Davis and Ernest Borgnine. In the film, the two ride a motorcycle through the mall while escaping from a bank robbery.

Winrock was built as an open-air mall with a screened canopy roof to protect shoppers from the elements, a first for New Mexico. It was later completely enclosed in 1975, by which time it had grown to more than 900,000 square feet (84,000 m^{2}) and around 70 stores. This renovation also added the distinctive burnt-orange pyramid at the east end of the mall. Other significant expansions took place in 1967, 1972, and 1981, and 1984, which brought an upper floor to Winrock. At its peak in the mid-1980s, the mall had 1,000,000 square feet (93,000 m^{2}) of gross leasable area and 130 stores.

Bealls was added in 1985. This space later became Oshman's and, later, Sports Authority. Also, the Fox Winrock Theater was demolished to make way for a new freestanding movie theater on the site, known as the Winrock 6, which opened on October 3, 1986.

Winrock received its largest renovation in 1990 to 1994, remodeling the east atrium and Montgomery Ward store, demolishing an underused wing at the west end of the mall, and adding a second Dillard's on the site of the former JCPenney store (vacated in 1990). The new Dillard's location housed men's and children's clothing, electronics, and housewares, while the women's clothing and cosmetics departments were kept at the original store.

Beginning in the late 1990s, the mall began a steep decline and vacancy rates began to climb. By 2005, tenants' leases were not renewed in anticipation of redevelopment of the property. That same year, the attached motor hotel Winrock Inn closed. By the turn of the century, the mall was clearly dead and decaying rapidly. The only remaining stores were the two Dillard's, Bed, Bath and Beyond, and a Sports Authority, each of which owned their respective spaces.

In 1999, Winrock Center was among the three New Mexico shopping malls, with the two others being Coronado Center and Cottonwood Mall, involved in a free speech lawsuit. Their policies on activity regulation were challenged by the SouthWest Organizing Project and ACLU after protesters attempted to hand out leaflets at the malls. This case was dismissed. The 1972 case Lloyd Corp. v. Tanner states that shopping malls may limit speech activities (such as distribution of pamphlets) on premises.

The mostly abandoned shopping center was used as a set for the filming of the 2009 American comedy film Observe and Report and the 2013 American mystery/thriller Odd Thomas.

== Redevelopment ==
=== 2002–2011 (Pre-Winrock Town Center) ===
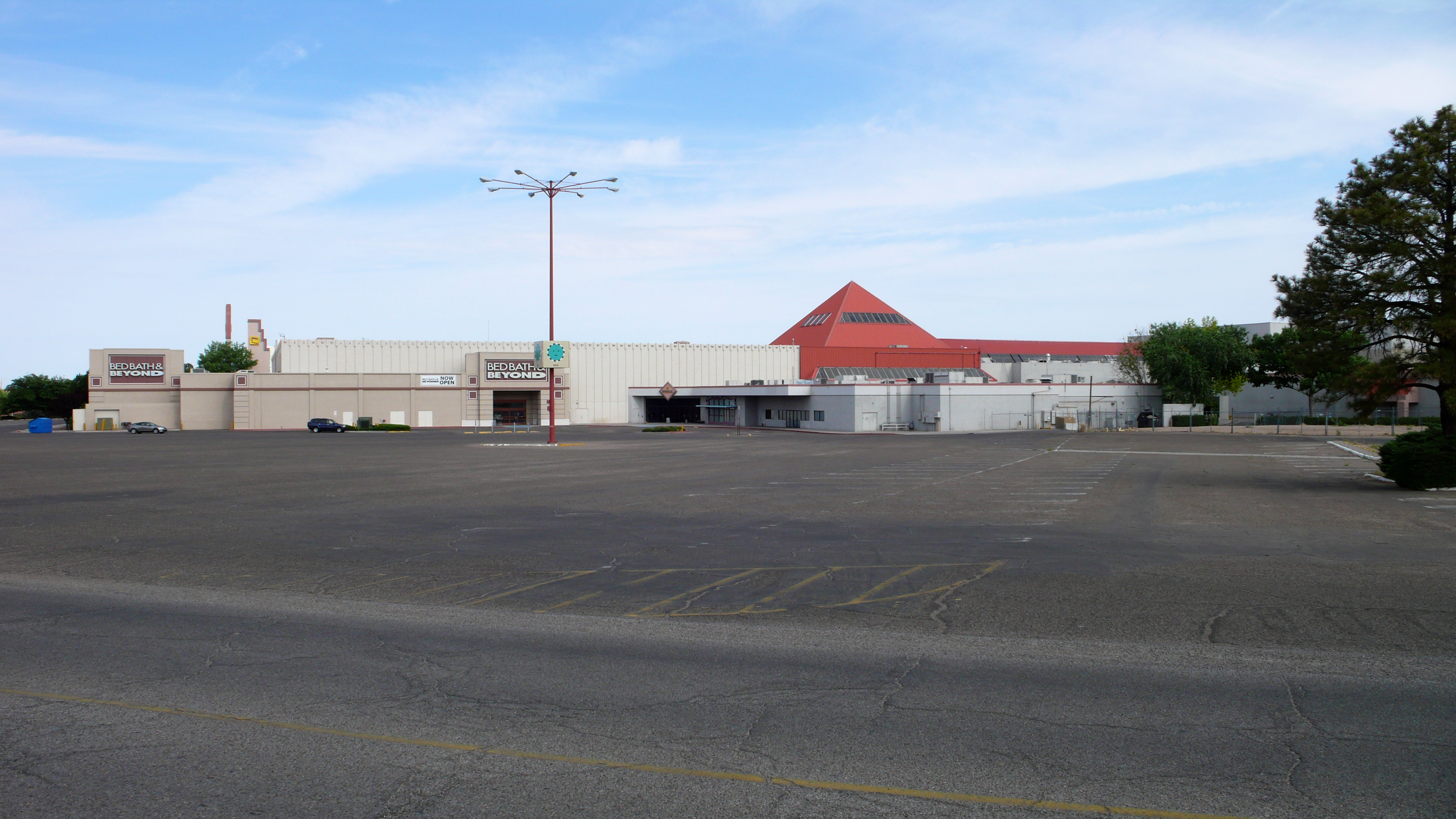
The mostly empty mall in 2008

In July 2002, New Jersey based PruWinrock LLC, the firm that owned the property, announced new development and proposed “an open-air large-format community center.” This failed incarnation would have included high-end retail, a movie theater, and apartment condos. The new center would have included 450,000 square feet (42,000 m^{2}) of retail space. Groundbreaking for phase I was to begin in 2003 and be completed two years later. PruWinrock's approval was denied by the planning commission for additional on and off-ramps to neighboring I-40 on the grounds that they had not completed a required traffic study.

Over the following years there were numerous false starts. Increasing construction and material costs were cited as a major factor in the delays. In 2007, PruWinrock sold the property to Albuquerque-based Goodman Realty Group for an undisclosed amount. Progress on the redevelopment project was slow. The new developers held community meetings to showcase the new plans in an effort to garner their approval and ask for their support. The presented master plan included 1,500,000 square feet (140,000 m^{2}) of new office, retail, restaurant, residential units, and a hotel. Also included were a 70,000-square-foot (6,500 m^{2}) movie theater (including IMAX), a grocery store, parks, plazas, and over 6000 parking spaces.

=== 2012–2017 (early redevelopment) ===
In February 2012, Goodman Realty Group announced that it had signed long-term leases with three major restaurants – Genghis Grill, BJ's Restaurant and Brewhouse, and Dave and Busters – to begin construction in the spring. Demolition of the Winrock Center mall began in May 2012. Winrock Inn was the first part of the mall to be demolished because it attracted criminal activity. Winrock 6, then branded as a United Artists theater under the ownership of Regal Entertainment Group, closed its doors in 2013 and was demolished that same year. BJ's and Genghis Grill both opened in 2012, while Dave and Buster's, which took over the site of the original Winrock 6, opened on November 3, 2014. Adjacent to BJ's, a Joe's Crab Shack was proposed, which would've been their first location in New Mexico. However, they withdrew in 2015. Instead, a Red Robin opened there in March 2017.

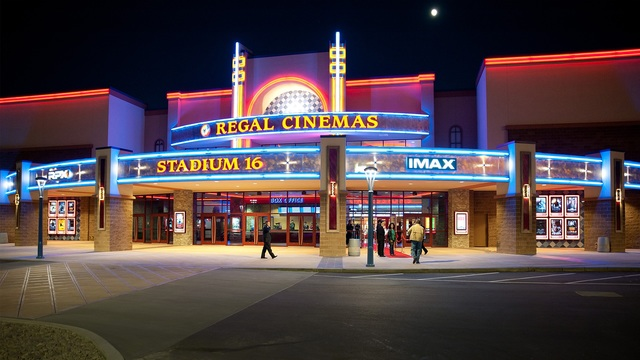
Regal Winrock Stadium 16 IMAX & RPX during nighttime

The first phase of the project, a Regal 16-screen IMAX and RPX Theatre, had its grand opening on November 15, 2013. Nordstrom Rack, DSW Shoe Warehouse, and other stores opened in Fall 2016. PetSmart opened a store adjacent to Ulta Beauty in November 2017.

The Corner at Winrock, a 22,000-square-foot building located on the southeast corner of Indian School and Uptown Loop behind Garduno's and Genghis Grill, began construction in 2016 and was completed in 2017. Sauce Pizza & Wine, a Scottsdale, Arizona–based chain, was the first tenant to open at The Corner in July 2017. A new Firehouse Subs location adjacent to Sauce Pizza & Wine opened on September 4, 2017. Takumi Restaurant, a new upscale Japanese restaurant from the people behind Azuma Sushi & Teppan, opened in November 2017, along with a Mark Pardo Salon Spa.

=== 2018–2025 (Winrock Park & continued redevelopment) ===
Between 2016 and 2025, Winrock Town Center continued its transformation into a mixed-use destination through the addition of several new tenants, public amenities, and event programming. Several nationally and locally recognized businesses opened during this period, including Ethan Allen, Presbyterian Health Plan Place, FarmaKeio NM, Hyena's Comedy Clubs, Bath & Body Works, Chicken Salad Chick, and Fidelity Investments, broadening the property's mix of retail, dining, healthcare, and entertainment.

A major milestone came with the grand opening of Winrock Park, a 2.5-acre landscaped green space featuring a performance stage, water feature, playground, and event lawn. Since opening, the park has become a central venue for community programming, hosting events such as the annual Winrock Wonderland holiday celebration, seasonal farmers and artisan markets, and a free outdoor concert series Live @ Winrock featuring local and touring acts.

In July 2024, a 150-room dual-branded TownePlace Suites & Fairfield Inn by Marriott hotel, built and operated by Sun Capital Hotels, opened on the northeast corner of the center, operating as the first dual-brand prototype hotel of its kind.

The following year, Regal Winrock completed major upgrades, debuting New Mexico’s first 4DX auditorium and installing luxury recliner seating across multiple auditoriums in July 2025.

The redevelopment also expanded into office space with the completion of the Portland Building, a three-story, Class A office and retail complex. Located directly adjacent to the park, the building welcomed new tenants including developers Goodman Realty Group, and RS21, a data science and analytics company, which announced plans to relocate its headquarters there in late 2025.

Future developments at Winrock Town Center is expected to include additional phases of mixed-use construction, such as a new food hall, park bar and restaurant, residential units, expanded office space, another hotel, and further retail and entertainment offerings.
