= Michael Malone =

American basketball coach (born 1971)

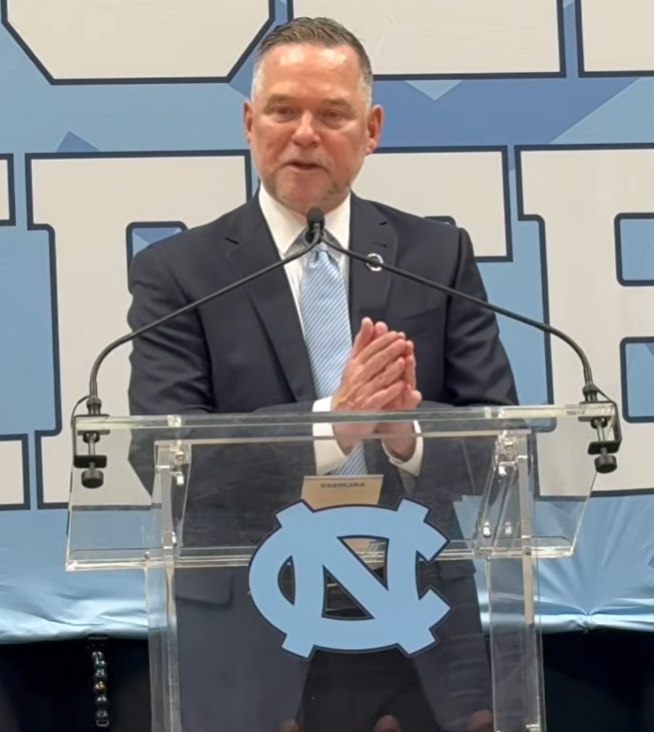
- Malone in 2026

Current position
- Title: Head coach
- Team: North Carolina
- Conference: ACC
- Record: 3–0 (1.000)
- Annual salary: $8.4 million

Biographical details
- Born: September 15, 1971 (age 55); Queens, New York, U.S.
- Height: 6 ft 2 in (188 cm)

Playing career
- 1989–1993: Loyola (Maryland)
- Position: Guard

Coaching career (HC unless noted)
- 1993–1994: Friends School of Baltimore (assistant)
- 1994–1995: Oakland (assistant)
- 1995–1998: Providence (assistant)
- 1999–2001: Manhattan (assistant)
- 2001–2005: New York Knicks (assistant)
- 2005–2010: Cleveland Cavaliers (assistant)
- 2010–2011: New Orleans Hornets (assistant)
- 2011–2013: Golden State Warriors (assistant)
- 2013–2014: Sacramento Kings
- 2015–2025: Denver Nuggets
- 2026–present: North Carolina

Accomplishments and honors

Championships
- NBA champion (2023)

Awards
- 2× NBA All-Star Game head coach (2019, 2023)

Michael Malone (born September 15, 1971) is an American basketball coach who is the head coach of the North Carolina Tar Heels men's basketball team. He previously coached in the National Basketball Association (NBA), where he was the head coach of the Sacramento Kings from 2013 to 2014 and the Denver Nuggets from 2015 to 2025. With the Nuggets, Malone won the 2023 NBA Finals, the franchise's first championship.

== Early life and education ==
Born in the Astoria neighborhood of the New York City borough Queens, Malone is the son of Brendan Malone, a former NBA head coach. Malone began his high school playing career at Bishop Hendricken in Warwick, Rhode Island, from 1984–1986 while his father was head coach at the University of Rhode Island. He transferred to Seton Hall Preparatory School after his father joined the New York Knicks coaching staff as an assistant. Following graduation from Seton Hall, Malone attended prep school at Worcester Academy during the 1988–89 school year. He then attended Loyola University Maryland, playing on the Loyola Greyhounds men's basketball team from 1989 to 1993. He appeared in 107 games and started 39 of them as a point guard. He graduated in 1994 with a degree in history. During his four seasons with the Greyhounds, Malone totaled 370 points, 279 assists, and 79 steals in 18.5 minutes per game. He was inducted to the Loyola Athletics Hall of Fame in March 2026.

== Coaching career ==
=== College (1994–2001) ===
While completing his degree at Loyola, Malone was an assistant high school basketball coach at Friends School of Baltimore. After graduating from Loyola, Malone joined Oakland University as an assistant coach for Golden Grizzlies men's basketball under coach Greg Kampe. Malone was about to start training to join the Michigan State Police before getting a job offer from Providence College coach Pete Gillen. Malone was an assistant coach for Providence Friars men's basketball from 1995 to 1998. In the 1998–99 season, Malone was director of men's basketball administration at the University of Virginia.

=== Early NBA years (2001–2011) ===
He later moved up to the NBA in 2001 as a coaching associate with the New York Knicks who worked with players, coaching staff, personnel and the video coordinator and edited scouting reports. The Knicks promoted Malone to assistant coach in 2003. Malone later served as an assistant coach for the Cleveland Cavaliers from 2005 to 2010. With Cleveland, Malone helped coach the Cavaliers to five consecutive playoff appearances, including the 2007 Finals, and a franchise-record, league-best 66–16 season in the 2008–09 season. Malone was an assistant coach with the New Orleans Hornets in the 2010–11 season. Allowing a league-best 8.7 fewer points per game than the previous season, the Hornets had the most improved defense with Malone as assistant and made the 2011 Playoffs.

=== Golden State Warriors (2011–2013) ===
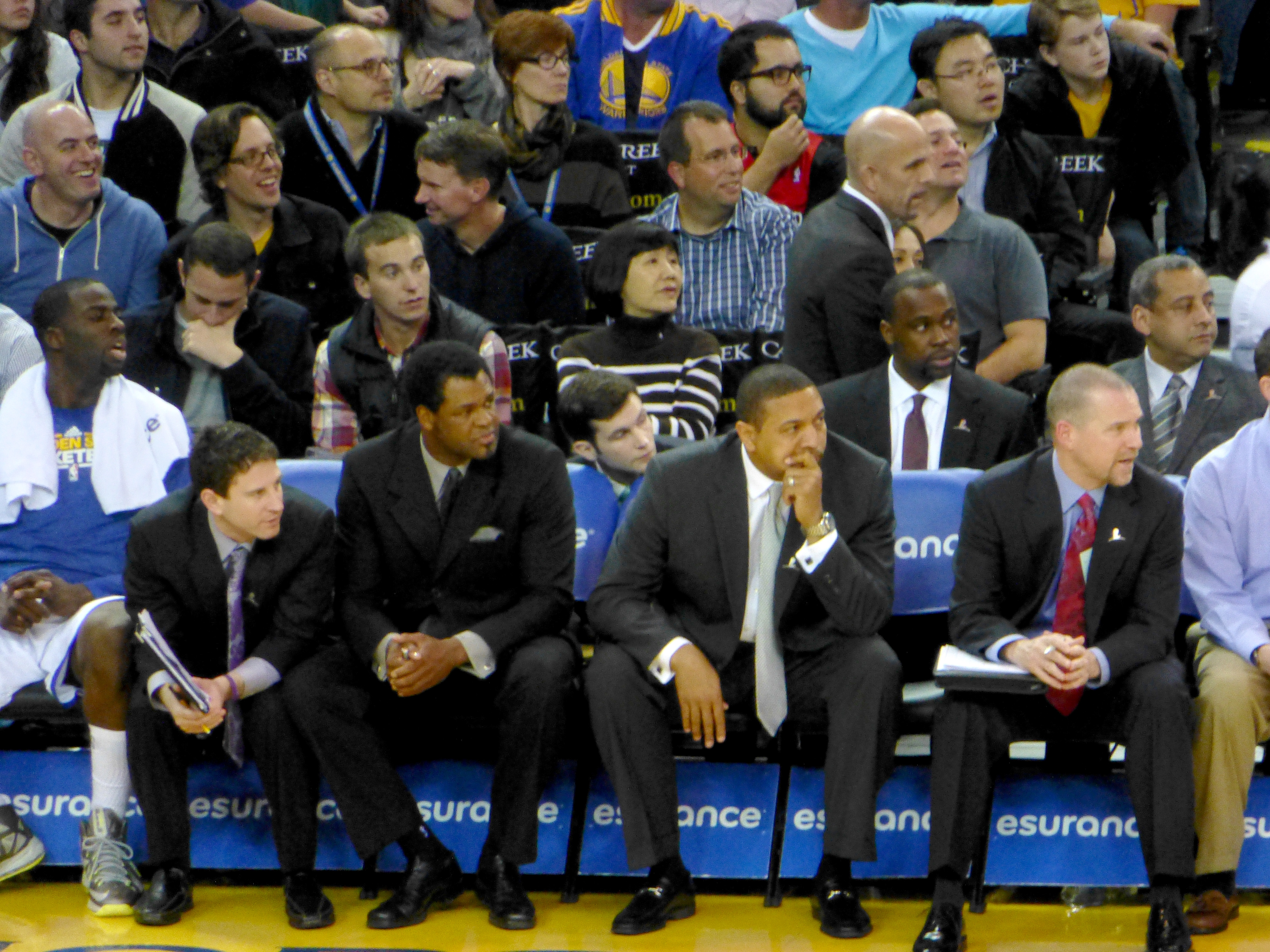
Malone (far right) as an assistant coach with the Golden State Warriors in 2013

The Golden State Warriors hired Malone in the summer of 2011 as an assistant coach under Mark Jackson. In the 2012–13 season, the Warriors improved from a 23–43 record to finish 47–35 and earn the team's first playoff berth since 2007. As the sixth seed in the 2013 playoffs, the Warriors upset the third-seed Denver Nuggets in the first round and lost to the eventual Western Conference champion San Antonio Spurs in six games the next round. Malone was reportedly the highest-paid NBA assistant coach in the 2011–12 season. In 2012, Malone was named the best assistant coach by the NBA general managers. After his departure, several Warriors, including Draymond Green and Stephen Curry, credited Malone as being a huge part of the team's success.

=== Sacramento Kings (2013–2014) ===
On June 3, 2013, Malone was hired by majority owner Vivek Ranadivé as the new head coach of the Sacramento Kings. With the hiring, Malone and his father became the second father-son duo in NBA history, after Bill Musselman and Eric Musselman, to head coach an NBA team. On December 15, 2014, he was fired by the Kings after starting the 2014–15 season with an 11–13 win–loss record.

=== Denver Nuggets (2015–2025) ===
On June 15, 2015, Malone was named the new head coach of the Denver Nuggets. In the 2018–19 season, he led the Nuggets to the second seed in the Western Conference, behind the Golden State Warriors, with a 54–28 record. In the Nuggets first playoff berth in six seasons, Denver defeated the San Antonio Spurs in the first round in seven games, before being eliminated in the semifinals by the Portland Trail Blazers, also in seven games. On December 24, 2019, the Nuggets announced that they had agreed to a contract extension with Malone. During the 2020 playoffs in the NBA Bubble, the Nuggets would become the first team in league history to overcome multiple 3–1 deficits in a single postseason, defeating the Utah Jazz and Los Angeles Clippers in the first round and semifinals, respectively. Despite the historic feat, Denver would be eliminated in the Western Conference finals by the eventual NBA champion, the Los Angeles Lakers, in five games.

On March 23, 2022, Malone and the Nuggets reached an agreement on a multi-year contract extension. In the 2022–23 season, outside of a few instances of being tied with the Memphis Grizzlies, the Nuggets held sole position of the top seed in the Western Conference from December 20 until the end of the regular season, earning Malone a second All-Star Game coaching gig in five years in the process. The Nuggets defeated the Minnesota Timberwolves in five games in the first round before needing six games to outlast Devin Booker, newly acquired Kevin Durant and the Phoenix Suns in the conference semifinals to advance to their second Conference Finals in four seasons. As in 2020, they were again be matched up with LeBron James, Anthony Davis, and the Los Angeles Lakers. Denver went on to sweep the Lakers and advance to their first NBA Finals in franchise history. It was also the first time a Nuggets team had ever swept an opponent in postseason history.

In the 2023 Finals, Denver faced the Miami Heat, the first eighth seed to reach the Finals since the 1998–99 New York Knicks. Holding a 3–1 series advantage heading into Game 5, the Nuggets, who entered the game with a series shooting average of 37.6% from three-point range, shot a historically poor 6.7% from distance in the first half. Additionally, Denver committed 10 turnovers in the first half and missed 10 of their first 19 free throws. Despite their shooting struggles, the Nuggets came back from an early 10-point deficit to take an 83–76 lead with 4:43 left in the fourth quarter and would ultimately defeat Miami 94–89 at home to clinch the first championship title in their 47-year history. Nikola Jokić was named the Finals MVP. On November 24, 2024, with a 127–102 win over the Los Angeles Lakers, Malone recorded his 433rd win with the Nuggets, surpassing Doug Moe for the most wins in franchise history. On April 8, 2025, after four consecutive losses, the Nuggets fired Malone and announced that they would not extend general manager Calvin Booth's contract. Malone's dismissal, 79 games into the season, tied the latest in-season change by any team in NBA history, and became the latest for a playoff team.

=== North Carolina Tar Heels (2026–present) ===
On April 7, 2026, Malone was announced as the 20th head coach of the North Carolina Tar Heels men's basketball team, signing a six-year contract worth a total of $50 million plus incentives. Malone's hiring marked the first time since the appointment of Frank McGuire in 1952 that North Carolina had selected a head coach with no previous ties to the program; McGuire was replaced in 1961 by his assistant Dean Smith, and all subsequent coaches either played for or coached alongside Smith.

== National team coaching career ==
In January 2020, Malone joined the Serbian national team coaching staff as a consultant for the Olympic Qualifying Tournament.

== Broadcasting career ==
After being fired by the Nuggets, Malone was named as a studio analyst for ABC/ESPN. He later joined as the studio analyst for NBA Countdown, replacing Bob Myers.

== Personal life ==
Malone and his wife Jocelyn have two daughters; the younger of whom, Bridget, plays volleyball at North Carolina.

== Head coaching record ==
=== NBA ===
Legend
Regular season	G	Games coached	W	Games won	L	Games lost	W–L %	Win–loss %
Playoffs	PG	Playoff games	PW	Playoff wins	PL	Playoff losses	PW–L %	Playoff win–loss %

Team	Year	G	W	L	W–L%	Finish	PG	PW	PL	PW–L%	Result
Sacramento	2013–14	82	28	54	.341	4th in Pacific	—	—	—	—	Missed playoffs
Sacramento	2014–15	24	11	13	.458	(fired)	—	—	—	—	—
Denver	2015–16	82	33	49	.402	4th in Northwest	—	—	—	—	Missed playoffs
Denver	2016–17	82	40	42	.488	4th in Northwest	—	—	—	—	Missed playoffs
Denver	2017–18	82	46	36	.561	5th in Northwest	—	—	—	—	Missed playoffs
Denver	2018–19	82	54	28	.659	1st in Northwest	14	7	7	.500	Lost in conference semifinals
Denver	2019–20	73	46	27	.630	1st in Northwest	19	9	10	.474	Lost in conference finals
Denver	2020–21	72	47	25	.653	2nd in Northwest	10	4	6	.400	Lost in conference semifinals
Denver	2021–22	82	48	34	.585	2nd in Northwest	5	1	4	.200	Lost in first round
Denver	2022–23	82	53	29	.646	1st in Northwest	20	16	4	.800	Won NBA championship
Denver	2023–24	82	57	25	.695	2nd in Northwest	12	7	5	.583	Lost in conference semifinals
Denver	2024–25	79	47	32	.595	(fired)	—	—	—	—	—
Career		904	510	394	.564		80	44	36	.550	

=== College ===
Record table
Season	Team	Overall	Conference	Standing	Postseason
North Carolina Tar Heels (Atlantic Coast Conference) (2026–present)
2026–27	North Carolina	4–1	0–0		
North Carolina:		4–1 (.800)	0–0 (–)		
Total:		4–1 (.800)			
National champion Postseason invitational champion Conference regular season champion Conference regular season and conference tournament champion Division regular season champion Division regular season and conference tournament champion Conference tournament champion
