= 2019–20 Portland Trail Blazers season =

NBA professional basketball team season

- Head coach: Terry Stotts
- General manager: Neil Olshey
- Owners: Estate of Paul Allen
- Arena: Moda Center

Results
- Record: 35–39 (.473)
- Place: Division: 4th (Northwest); Conference: 8th (Western)
- Playoff finish: First round (lost to Lakers 1–4)
- Stats at Basketball Reference

Local media
- Television: NBC Sports Northwest
- Radio: KPOJ, Portland Trail Blazers Radio

The 2019–20 Portland Trail Blazers season was the franchise's 50th season in the National Basketball Association (NBA). The Trail Blazers entered the season following a playoff defeat from the Golden State Warriors in the Western Conference finals.

The season was suspended by the league officials following the games of March 11 after it was reported that Rudy Gobert tested positive for COVID-19.

On June 4, the Trail Blazers were one of 22 teams invited to the NBA Bubble.

On August 15, the Trail Blazers clinched the 8th seed after defeating the Memphis Grizzlies in a play-in game. With the Blazers clinching a playoff berth, this was the 3rd consecutive season where 4 of 5 teams in the Northwest Division clinched the playoffs.

Despite their first losing season since the 2012–13 season, the Trail Blazers were tied at 7 seasons with the defending champion Toronto Raptors with the 2nd most active playoff streak behind the Houston Rockets.

The Trail Blazers faced off against the Los Angeles Lakers in the first round of the playoffs, marking the first meeting between the two teams in the playoffs since 2002. Despite a strong Game 1 victory, Damian Lillard was forced to leave the bubble after suffering a right knee injury in Game 4, and the Trail Blazers lost the series in 5 games. Like in 2002, the Lakers went on to win the championship.

== Draft picks ==
Round	Pick	Player	Position	Nationality	School / club team
1	25	Nassir Little	SF	United States	North Carolina

== Roster ==
2019–20 Portland Trail Blazers roster
Players

Pos.	No.	Player	Height	Weight	DOB	From
G	10	Jaylen Adams	6 ft 0 in (1.83 m)	225 lb (102 kg)	1996–05–04	St. Bonaventure
F	00	Carmelo Anthony	6 ft 8 in (2.03 m)	240 lb (109 kg)	1984–05–29	Syracuse
F	8	Trevor Ariza	6 ft 8 in (2.03 m)	215 lb (98 kg)	1985–06–30	UCLA
C	4	Moses Brown (TW)	7 ft 1 in (2.16 m)	245 lb (111 kg)	1999–10–13	UCLA
F/C	33	Zach Collins	7 ft 0 in (2.13 m)	235 lb (107 kg)	1997–11–19	Gonzaga
F	35	Wenyen Gabriel	6 ft 9 in (2.06 m)	205 lb (93 kg)	1997–03–26	Kentucky
F	44	Mario Hezonja	6 ft 8 in (2.03 m)	225 lb (102 kg)	1995–02–25	Croatia
F	6	Jaylen Hoard (TW)	6 ft 8 in (2.03 m)	215 lb (98 kg)	1999–03–30	Wake Forest
F	5	Rodney Hood (injured)	6 ft 8 in (2.03 m)	206 lb (93 kg)	1992–10–20	Duke
G	0	Damian Lillard	6 ft 3 in (1.91 m)	195 lb (88 kg)	1990–07–15	Weber State
F	9	Nassir Little	6 ft 6 in (1.98 m)	220 lb (100 kg)	2000–02–11	North Carolina
G	3	CJ McCollum	6 ft 3 in (1.91 m)	190 lb (86 kg)	1991–09–19	Lehigh
C	27	Jusuf Nurkić	7 ft 0 in (2.13 m)	275 lb (125 kg)	1994–08–23	Bosnia and Herzegovina
G	1	Anfernee Simons	6 ft 4 in (1.93 m)	185 lb (84 kg)	1999–06–08	IMG Academy (FL)
F	50	Caleb Swanigan	6 ft 9 in (2.06 m)	260 lb (118 kg)	1997–04–18	Purdue
G	2	Gary Trent	6 ft 6 in (1.98 m)	205 lb (93 kg)	1999–01–18	Duke
C	21	Hassan Whiteside	7 ft 0 in (2.13 m)	265 lb (120 kg)	1989–06–13	Marshall

Coaches
Head coach
- Terry Stotts
Assistant(s)
- John McCullough
- Jim Moran
- Dale Osbourne
- Jannero Pargo
- Nate Tibbetts (Associate HC)

Legend
- (DP) Unsigned draft pick
- (FA) Free agent
- (S) Suspended
- (GL) On assignment to G League
- (TW) Two-way affiliate player
- Injured

Roster
Updated: 2020–01–20

== Standings ==
=== Division ===
Northwest Division	W	L	PCT	GB	Home	Road	Div	GP
y – Denver Nuggets	46	27	.630	–	26‍–‍11	20‍–‍16	12–2	73
x – Oklahoma City Thunder	44	28	.611	1.5	23‍–‍14	21‍–‍14	8–5	72
x – Utah Jazz	44	28	.611	1.5	23‍–‍12	21‍–‍16	5–7	72
x – Portland Trail Blazers	35	39	.473	11.5	21‍–‍15	14‍–‍24	5–8	74
Minnesota Timberwolves	19	45	.297	22.5	8‍–‍24	11‍–‍21	2–10	64

=== Conference ===
Western Conference
#	Team	W	L	PCT	GB	GP
1	c – Los Angeles Lakers *	52	19	.732	–	71
2	x – Los Angeles Clippers	49	23	.681	3.5	72
3	y – Denver Nuggets *	46	27	.630	7.0	73
4	y – Houston Rockets *	44	28	.611	8.5	72
5	x – Oklahoma City Thunder	44	28	.611	8.5	72
6	x – Utah Jazz	44	28	.611	8.5	72
7	x – Dallas Mavericks	43	32	.573	11.0	75
8	x – Portland Trail Blazers	35	39	.473	18.5	74
9	pi – Memphis Grizzlies	34	39	.466	19.0	73
10	Phoenix Suns	34	39	.466	19.0	73
11	San Antonio Spurs	32	39	.451	20.0	71
12	Sacramento Kings	31	41	.431	21.5	72
13	New Orleans Pelicans	30	42	.417	22.5	72
14	Minnesota Timberwolves	19	45	.297	29.5	64
15	Golden State Warriors	15	50	.231	34.0	65

== Game log ==
=== Preseason ===
The preseason schedule was announced on July 29, 2019.

2019 preseason game log
Total: 2–3 (home: 1–2; road: 1–1)
Preseason: 2–3 (home: 1–2; road: 1–1)

Game	Date	Team	Score	High points	High rebounds	High assists	Location Attendance	Record
1	October 8	Denver	L 94–105	Mario Hezonja (12)	Skal Labissière (12)	Lillard, McCollum, Labissière, Hezonja, Simons (2)	Veterans Memorial Coliseum; 10,942	0–1
2	October 10	Maccabi Haifa	W 104–68	Anfernee Simons (22)	Skal Labissière (15)	London Perrantes (6)	Moda Center; 12,157	1–1
3	October 12	Phoenix	L 118–134	CJ McCollum (27)	Skal Labissière (8)	Hezonja, Collins (5)	Moda Center; 18,468	1–2
4	October 16	@ Utah	W 126–118	CJ McCollum (28)	Hassan Whiteside (11)	Lillard, McCollum (4)	Vivint Smart Home Arena; 17,513	2–2
5	October 17	@ Denver	L 104–110	Mario Hezonja (18)	Zach Collins (11)	Mario Hezonja (6)	Pepsi Center; 14,484	2–3

2019–20 season schedule

=== Regular season ===
2019–20 game log
Total: 35–39 (home: 21–15; road: 14–24)
October: 3–2 (home: 0–1; road: 3–1)

Game	Date	Team	Score	High points	High rebounds	High assists	Location Attendance	Record
1	October 23	Denver	L 100–108	Damian Lillard (32)	Hassan Whiteside (19)	Damian Lillard (8)	Moda Center; 19,991	0–1
2	October 25	@ Sacramento	W 122–112	Damian Lillard (35)	Hassan Whiteside (9)	Lillard, Collins, Bazemore (5)	Golden 1 Center; 17,583	1–1
3	October 27	@ Dallas	W 121–119	CJ McCollum (35)	Hassan Whiteside (14)	Damian Lillard (5)	American Airlines Center; 19,707	2–1
4	October 28	@ San Antonio	L 110–113	Damian Lillard (28)	Anthony Tolliver (10)	Damian Lillard (7)	AT&T Center; 18,083	2–2
5	October 30	@ Oklahoma City	W 102–99	Damian Lillard (23)	Hassan Whiteside (12)	Damian Lillard (12)	Chesapeake Energy Arena; 18,203	3–2

November: 5–10 (home: 3–3; road: 2–7)

Game	Date	Team	Score	High points	High rebounds	High assists	Location Attendance	Record
6	November 2	Philadelphia	L 128–129	Damian Lillard (33)	Mario Hezonja (12)	Damian Lillard (9)	Moda Center; 19,441	3–3
7	November 4	@ Golden State	L 118–127	Damian Lillard (39)	Hassan Whiteside (11)	CJ McCollum (6)	Chase Center; 18,064	3–4
8	November 7	@ L. A. Clippers	L 101–107	McCollum, Lillard (22)	Hassan Whiteside (19)	Damian Lillard (6)	Staples Center; 19,068	3–5
9	November 8	Brooklyn	L 115–119	Damian Lillard (60)	Hassan Whiteside (15)	Damian Lillard (5)	Moda Center; 20,089	3–6
10	November 10	Atlanta	W 124–113 (OT)	Damian Lillard (30)	Hassan Whiteside (12)	Damian Lillard (6)	Moda Center; 20,041	4–6
11	November 12	@ Sacramento	L 99–107	Damian Lillard (27)	Hassan Whiteside (7)	Damian Lillard (5)	Golden 1 Center; 16,358	4–7
12	November 13	Toronto	L 106–114	Rodney Hood (25)	Whiteside, Labissiere (9)	Damian Lillard (10)	Moda Center; 19,544	4–8
13	November 16	@ San Antonio	W 121–116	CJ McCollum (32)	Hassan Whiteside (12)	CJ McCollum (7)	AT&T Center; 18,534	5–8
14	November 18	@ Houston	L 108–132	CJ McCollum (25)	Hassan Whiteside (8)	Damian Lillard (11)	Toyota Center; 18,055	5–9
15	November 19	@ New Orleans	L 104–115	CJ McCollum (22)	Hassan Whiteside (14)	CJ McCollum (5)	Smoothie King Center; 15,021	5–10
16	November 21	@ Milwaukee	L 129–137	CJ McCollum (37)	Skal Labissière (12)	CJ McCollum (10)	Fiserv Forum; 17,385	5–11
17	November 23	@ Cleveland	L 104–110	Damian Lillard (23)	Damian Lillard (8)	Damian Lillard (8)	Rocket Mortgage FieldHouse; 19,432	5–12
18	November 25	@ Chicago	W 117–94	Carmelo Anthony (25)	Hassan Whiteside (12)	Damian Lillard (12)	United Center; 18,776	6–12
19	November 27	Oklahoma City	W 136–119	Damian Lillard (27)	Hassan Whiteside (16)	Damian Lillard (5)	Moda Center; 19,870	7–12
20	November 29	Chicago	W 107–103	Damian Lillard (28)	Hassan Whiteside (15)	Damian Lillard (6)	Moda Center; 20,139	8–12

December: 6–8 (home: 5–5; road: 1–3)

Game	Date	Team	Score	High points	High rebounds	High assists	Location Attendance	Record
21	December 3	@ L. A. Clippers	L 97–117	CJ McCollum (20)	Hassan Whiteside (13)	Damian Lillard (7)	Staples Center; 19,068	8–13
22	December 4	Sacramento	W 127–116	CJ McCollum (33)	Hassan Whiteside (16)	Damian Lillard (10)	Moda Center; 19,393	9–13
23	December 6	L. A. Lakers	L 113–136	Damian Lillard (29)	Hassan Whiteside (10)	Damian Lillard (8)	Moda Center; 19,912	9–14
24	December 8	Oklahoma City	L 96–108	Damian Lillard (26)	Hassan Whiteside (10)	Damian Lillard (7)	Moda Center; 19,393	9–15
25	December 10	New York	W 115–87	Damian Lillard (31)	Hassan Whiteside (15)	Damian Lillard (6)	Moda Center; 19,393	10–15
26	December 12	@ Denver	L 99–114	Hassan Whiteside (33)	Hassan Whiteside (11)	Damian Lillard (11)	Pepsi Center; 18,828	10–16
27	December 16	@ Phoenix	W 111–110	CJ McCollum (30)	Hassan Whiteside (14)	CJ McCollum (6)	Talking Stick Resort Arena; 14,193	11–16
28	December 18	Golden State	W 122–112	Damian Lillard (31)	Hassan Whiteside (23)	Damian Lillard (13)	Moda Center; 19,393	12–16
29	December 20	Orlando	W 118–103	Damian Lillard (36)	Hassan Whiteside (17)	Damian Lillard (6)	Moda Center; 19,393	13–16
30	December 21	Minnesota	W 113–106	Damian Lillard (29)	Hassan Whiteside (22)	Damian Lillard (7)	Moda Center; 19,393	14–16
31	December 23	New Orleans	L 94–102	Carmelo Anthony (23)	Hassan Whiteside (16)	Damian Lillard (7)	Moda Center; 19,499	14–17
32	December 26	@ Utah	L 115–121	Damian Lillard (34)	Anfernee Simons (10)	Damian Lillard (8)	Vivint Smart Home Arena; 18,306	14–18
33	December 28	L. A. Lakers	L 120–128	Damian Lillard (31)	Hassan Whiteside (16)	Damian Lillard (9)	Moda Center; 19,960	14–19
34	December 30	Phoenix	L 116–122	Damian Lillard (33)	Hassan Whiteside (22)	Damian Lillard (7)	Moda Center; 19,896	14–20

January: 8–7 (home: 4–2; road: 4–5)

Game	Date	Team	Score	High points	High rebounds	High assists	Location Attendance	Record
35	January 1	@ New York	L 93–117	Carmelo Anthony (26)	Hassan Whiteside (12)	Damian Lillard (8)	Madison Square Garden; 19,812	14–21
36	January 3	@ Washington	W 122–103	Damian Lillard (35)	Hassan Whiteside (21)	CJ McCollum (6)	Capital One Arena; 17,945	15–21
37	January 5	@ Miami	L 111–122	Damian Lillard (34)	Hassan Whiteside (18)	Damian Lillard (12)	American Airlines Arena; 19,846	15–22
38	January 7	@ Toronto	W 101–99	Carmelo Anthony (28)	Hassan Whiteside (16)	Damian Lillard (9)	Scotiabank Arena; 19,800	16–22
39	January 9	@ Minnesota	L 102–116	Damian Lillard (20)	Hassan Whiteside (14)	Damian Lillard (8)	Target Center; 13,720	16–23
40	January 11	Milwaukee	L 101–122	Damian Lillard (26)	Anthony, Tolliver (11)	McCollum, Lillard (5)	Moda Center; 19,843	16–24
41	January 13	Charlotte	W 115–112	Damian Lillard (30)	Tolliver, Whiteside (11)	Damian Lillard (9)	Moda Center; 19,111	17–24
42	January 15	@ Houston	W 117–107	Damian Lillard (25)	Hassan Whiteside (18)	Damian Lillard (7)	Toyota Center; 18,055	18–24
43	January 17	@ Dallas	L 112–120	Damian Lillard (34)	Hassan Whiteside (18)	Damian Lillard (10)	American Airlines Center; 20,283	18–25
44	January 18	@ Oklahoma City	L 106–119	Damian Lillard (34)	Hassan Whiteside (9)	Damian Lillard (6)	Chesapeake Energy Arena; 18,203	18–26
45	January 20	Golden State	W 129–124 (OT)	Damian Lillard (61)	Hassan Whiteside (21)	Damian Lillard (7)	Moda Center; 19,493	19–26
46	January 23	Dallas	L 125–133	Damian Lillard (47)	Carmelo Anthony (11)	Damian Lillard (8)	Moda Center; 18,574	19–27
47	January 26	Indiana	W 139–129	Damian Lillard (50)	Hassan Whiteside (14)	Damian Lillard (13)	Moda Center; 19,663	20–27
48	January 29	Houston	W 125–112	Damian Lillard (36)	Carmelo Anthony (13)	Damian Lillard (11)	Moda Center; 19,393	21–27
49	January 31	@ L. A. Lakers	W 127–119	Damian Lillard (48)	Hassan Whiteside (13)	Damian Lillard (10)	Staples Center; 18,997	22–27

February: 4–8 (home: 4–2; road: 0–6)

Game	Date	Team	Score	High points	High rebounds	High assists	Location Attendance	Record
50	February 1	Utah	W 124–107	Damian Lillard (51)	Hassan Whiteside (21)	Damian Lillard (12)	Moda Center; 19,603	23–27
51	February 4	@ Denver	L 99–127	Damian Lillard (21)	Caleb Swanigan (10)	Damian Lillard (9)	Pepsi Center; 19,520	23–28
52	February 6	San Antonio	W 125–117	Damian Lillard (26)	Hassan Whiteside (23)	Damian Lillard (10)	Moda Center; 19,653	24–28
53	February 7	@ Utah	L 114–117	Damian Lillard (42)	Caleb Swanigan (11)	Damian Lillard (6)	Vivint Smart Home Arena; 18,306	24–29
54	February 9	Miami	W 115–109	Damian Lillard (33)	Hassan Whiteside (17)	Damian Lillard (8)	Moda Center; 19,726	25–29
55	February 11	@ New Orleans	L 117–138	Lillard, McCollum (20)	Hassan Whiteside (14)	Damian Lillard (6)	Smoothie King Center; 15,739	25–30
56	February 12	@ Memphis	L 104–111	CJ McCollum (23)	Carmelo Anthony (15)	Damian Lillard (10)	FedExForum; 16,889	25–31
All-Star Break
57	February 21	New Orleans	L 115–128	CJ McCollum (27)	Hassan Whiteside (12)	CJ McCollum (10)	Moda Center; 19,946	25–32
58	February 23	Detroit	W 107–104	CJ McCollum (41)	Hassan Whiteside (17)	CJ McCollum (12)	Moda Center; 19,393	26–32
59	February 25	Boston	L 106–118	CJ McCollum (28)	Hassan Whiteside (19)	CJ McCollum (10)	Moda Center; 19,460	26–33
60	February 27	@ Indiana	L 100–106	CJ McCollum (28)	Hassan Whiteside (16)	CJ McCollum (8)	Bankers Life Fieldhouse; 16,872	26–34
61	February 29	@ Atlanta	L 117–129	CJ McCollum (35)	Hassan Whiteside (13)	CJ McCollum (5)	State Farm Arena; 17,765	26–35

March: 3–2 (home: 2–1; road: 1–1)

Game	Date	Team	Score	High points	High rebounds	High assists	Location Attendance	Record
62	March 2	@ Orlando	W 130–107	CJ McCollum (41)	Hassan Whiteside (13)	McCollum, Simons (5)	Amway Center; 18,078	27–35
63	March 4	Washington	W 125–104	Carmelo Anthony (25)	Hassan Whiteside (16)	Lillard, McCollum (5)	Moda Center; 19,393	28–35
64	March 6	@ Phoenix	L 117–127	CJ McCollum (25)	Hassan Whiteside (20)	CJ McCollum (8)	Talking Stick Resort Arena; 15,522	28–36
65	March 7	Sacramento	L 111–123	McCollum, Whiteside (19)	Hassan Whiteside (11)	Lillard, McCollum (6)	Moda Center; 19,691	28–37
66	March 10	Phoenix	W 121–105	Damian Lillard (25)	Hassan Whiteside (14)	Damian Lillard (7)	Moda Center; 19,393	29–37

Seeding games: 6–2 (home: 3–1; road: 3–1)

Game	Date	Team	Score	High points	High rebounds	High assists	Location Attendance	Record
67	July 31	Memphis	W 140–135 (OT)	CJ McCollum (33)	Collins, Nurkic (9)	Damian Lillard (9)	The Arena; No In-Person Attendance	30–37
68	August 2	@ Boston	L 124–128	Lillard, Nurkic (30)	Jusuf Nurkic (9)	Damian Lillard (16)	The Arena; No In-Person Attendance	30–38
69	August 4	Houston	W 110–102	Damian Lillard (21)	Jusuf Nurkic (19)	Damian Lillard (8)	The Arena; No In-Person Attendance	31–38
70	August 6	@ Denver	W 125–115	Damian Lillard (45)	Zach Collins (9)	Damian Lillard (12)	Visa Athletic Center; No In-Person Attendance	32–38
71	August 8	L. A. Clippers	L 117–122	CJ McCollum (29)	Jusuf Nurkic (13)	Jusuf Nurkic (9)	HP Field House; No In-Person Attendance	32–39
72	August 9	Philadelphia	W 124–121	Damian Lillard (51)	Anthony, Hezonja, McCollum (7)	Damian Lillard (7)	Visa Athletic Center; No In-Person Attendance	33–39
73	August 11	@ Dallas	W 134–131	Damian Lillard (61)	Jusuf Nurkic (9)	Damian Lillard (8)	The Arena; No In-Person Attendance	34–39
74	August 13	@ Brooklyn	W 134–133	Damian Lillard (42)	Jusuf Nurkic (10)	Damian Lillard (12)	The Arena; No In-Person Attendance	35–39

Cancelled games

Game	Date	Team	Score	High points	High rebounds	High assists	Location Attendance	Record
67	March 12	Memphis					Moda Center	
68	March 15	Houston					Moda Center	
69	March 17	Minnesota					Moda Center	
70	March 19	Dallas					Moda Center	
71	March 22	@ Minnesota					Target Center	
72	March 24	@ Charlotte					Spectrum Center	
73	March 25	@ Detroit					Little Caesars Arena	
74	March 27	@ Boston					TD Garden	
75	March 29	@ Philadelphia					Wells Fargo Center	
76	March 30	@ Brooklyn					Barclays Center	
77	April 2	Utah					Moda Center	
78	April 5	Memphis					Moda Center	
79	April 7	Cleveland					Moda Center	
80	April 9	Denver					Moda Center	
81	April 13	@ Golden State					Chase Center	
82	April 15	LA Clippers					Moda Center	

2019–20 season schedule

On January 31, 2020, the Trail Blazers played on the road at the Los Angeles Lakers, winning 127–119, behind a 48-point, 10-assist outing from Damian Lillard, in a game aired nationally on ESPN. This was the Lakers’ first game in the aftermath of Kobe Bryant’s death in a helicopter crash five days earlier, which in total took the lives of nine people, including Bryant’s 13-year-old daughter Gianna. The Lakers were to play against the Los Angeles Clippers two days after the accident, however that game was postponed out of respect for Bryant and also due to the Lakers not feeling ready to showcase a game in light of the tragedy. Prior to tipoff, the Lakers conducted a 24-minute long, heavily detailed tribute to Bryant, his daughter and the seven other victims. This game turned out to be the second most watched NBA broadcast ever in ESPN's history, averaging 4.41 million viewers, with the first ever head-to-head meeting between Shaquille O'Neal and Yao Ming in 2003 being the only one with higher viewership.

=== Play-in ===
2020 play-in game log
Play-in Game: 1–0 (home: 1–0; road: 0–0)

Game	Date	Team	Score	High points	High rebounds	High assists	Location Attendance	Record
1	August 15	Memphis	W 126–122	Damian Lillard (31)	Jusuf Nurkic (21)	Damian Lillard (10)	HP Field House; No In-person Attendance	1–0

=== Playoffs ===
2020 playoff game log
First round: 1–4 (home: 0–2; road: 1–2)

Game	Date	Team	Score	High points	High rebounds	High assists	Location Attendance	Series
1	August 18	@ L. A. Lakers	W 100–93	Damian Lillard (34)	Jusuf Nurkic (15)	Anthony, Lillard (5)	The Arena; No In-Person Attendance	1–0
2	August 20	@ L. A. Lakers	L 88–111	Damian Lillard (18)	Hassan Whiteside (9)	CJ McCollum (3)	The Arena; No In-Person Attendance	1–1
3	August 22	L. A. Lakers	L 108–116	Damian Lillard (34)	McCollum, Whiteside (8)	Damian Lillard (7)	The Arena; No In-Person Attendance	1–2
4	August 24	L. A. Lakers	L 115–135	Jusuf Nurkic (20)	Jusuf Nurkic (13)	Anfernee Simons (6)	The Arena; No In-Person Attendance	1–3
5	August 29	@ L. A. Lakers	L 122–131	CJ McCollum (36)	Jusuf Nurkic (10)	CJ McCollum (7)	The Arena; No In-Person Attendance	1–4

2020 playoff schedule

== Player statistics ==
Legend
GP	Games played	GS	Games started	MPG	Minutes per game
FG%	Field-goal percentage	3P%	3-point field-goal percentage	FT%	Free-throw percentage
RPG	Rebounds per game	APG	Assists per game	SPG	Steals per game
BPG	Blocks per game	PPG	Points per game

=== Regular season ===
Portland Trail Blazers statistics
Player	GP	GS	MPG	FG%	3P%	FT%	RPG	APG	SPG	BPG	PPG
CJ McCollum	70	70	36.5	.451	.379	.757	4.2	4.4	.8	.6	22.2
Anfernee Simons	70	4	20.7	.399	.332	.826	2.2	1.4	.4	.1	8.3
Hassan Whiteside	67	61	30.0	.621	.571	.686	13.5	1.2	.4	2.9	15.5
Damian Lillard	66	66	37.5	.463	.401	.888	4.3	8.0	1.1	.3	30.0
Gary Trent Jr.	61	8	21.8	.444	.418	.822	1.6	1.0	.8	.3	8.9
Carmelo Anthony	58	58	32.8	.430	.385	.845	6.3	1.5	.8	.5	15.4
Mario Hezonja	53	4	16.4	.422	.308	.814	3.5	.9	.7	.2	4.8
Nassir Little	48	5	11.9	.430	.237	.636	2.3	.5	.3	.3	3.6
Kent Bazemore^{†}	43	21	25.8	.347	.327	.806	4.0	1.4	1.0	.7	7.9
Anthony Tolliver^{†}	33	9	16.8	.368	.337	.684	3.3	.9	.2	.3	3.9
Skal Labissière	33	1	17.2	.551	.231	.758	5.1	1.3	.2	.9	5.8
Trevor Ariza^{†}	21	21	33.4	.491	.400	.872	4.8	2.0	1.6	.4	11.0
Rodney Hood	21	21	29.5	.506	.493	.778	3.4	1.5	.8	.2	11.0
Caleb Swanigan^{†}	20	1	13.3	.605	.000	.533	4.7	1.5	.1	.3	3.0
Wenyen Gabriel^{†}	19	1	9.2	.484	.417	.750	2.2	.3	.4	.3	2.3
Jaylen Hoard	13	0	7.9	.469	.000	.615	2.5	.3	.4	.0	2.9
Zach Collins	11	11	26.4	.471	.368	.750	6.3	1.5	.5	.5	7.0
Moses Brown	9	0	3.7	.400		.375	1.6	.1	.1	.1	1.2
Jusuf Nurkić	8	8	31.6	.495	.200	.886	10.3	4.0	1.4	2.0	17.6

=== Playoffs ===
Portland Trail Blazers statistics
Player	GP	GS	MPG	FG%	3P%	FT%	RPG	APG	SPG	BPG	PPG
CJ McCollum	5	5	39.2	.444	.371	.682	5.8	3.2	1.2	.4	23.2
Carmelo Anthony	5	5	35.2	.412	.421	.857	5.0	2.0	1.0	.4	15.2
Jusuf Nurkić	5	5	32.2	.439	.273	.783	10.4	3.6	1.4	.2	14.2
Hassan Whiteside	5	3	21.2	.542	1.000	.500	7.0	.4	.2	2.0	6.8
Gary Trent Jr.	5	1	30.6	.356	.417	.857	2.0	.6	.8	.0	9.6
Mario Hezonja	5	0	13.6	.409	.286	.750	3.2	1.2	.6	.0	4.6
Damian Lillard	4	4	35.8	.406	.394	.970	3.5	4.3	.5	.3	24.3
Wenyen Gabriel	4	2	13.3	.600	.400	.500	2.5	1.0	.5	.5	5.3
Anfernee Simons	4	0	20.5	.308	.429	.833	2.8	2.5	1.5	.0	6.8
Jaylen Hoard	3	0	13.7	.583			3.0	.3	.0	.0	4.7
Jaylen Adams	3	0	7.0	.333	.000		1.0	.7	.3	.0	2.0

- ^{†} Denotes player spent time with another team in the season. Stats reflect time with the Trail Blazers only.

== Transactions ==
=== Trades ===
June 24, 2019	To Portland Trail Blazers Kent Bazemore	To Atlanta Hawks Evan Turner
July 6, 2019	To Portland Trail Blazers Hassan Whiteside	To Miami Heat Meyers Leonard; Moe Harkless
January 21, 2020	To Portland Trail Blazers Trevor Ariza; Wenyen Gabriel; Caleb Swanigan	To Sacramento Kings Kent Bazemore; Anthony Tolliver; 2024 second-round pick 2025 second-round pick
February 7, 2020	To Portland Trail Blazers 2024 second-round pick	To Atlanta Hawks Skal Labissière; Cash consideration

=== Free agency ===
==== Re-signed ====
Player	Signed
Rodney Hood	July 6, 2019

==== Additions ====
Player	Signed	Former team
Jaylen Hoard	July 2, 2019	Wake Forest
Mario Hezonja	July 3, 2019	New York Knicks
Anthony Tolliver	July 3, 2019	Minnesota Timberwolves
Pau Gasol	July 25, 2019	Milwaukee Bucks
Moses Brown	October 19, 2019	UCLA
Carmelo Anthony	November 19, 2019	Houston Rockets

==== Subtractions ====
Player	Reason left	New team
Al-Farouq Aminu		Orlando Magic
Jake Layman		Minnesota Timberwolves
Seth Curry		Dallas Mavericks
Enes Kanter		Boston Celtics
Pau Gasol	Waived	
