= Monté Morris =

American basketball player (born 1995)

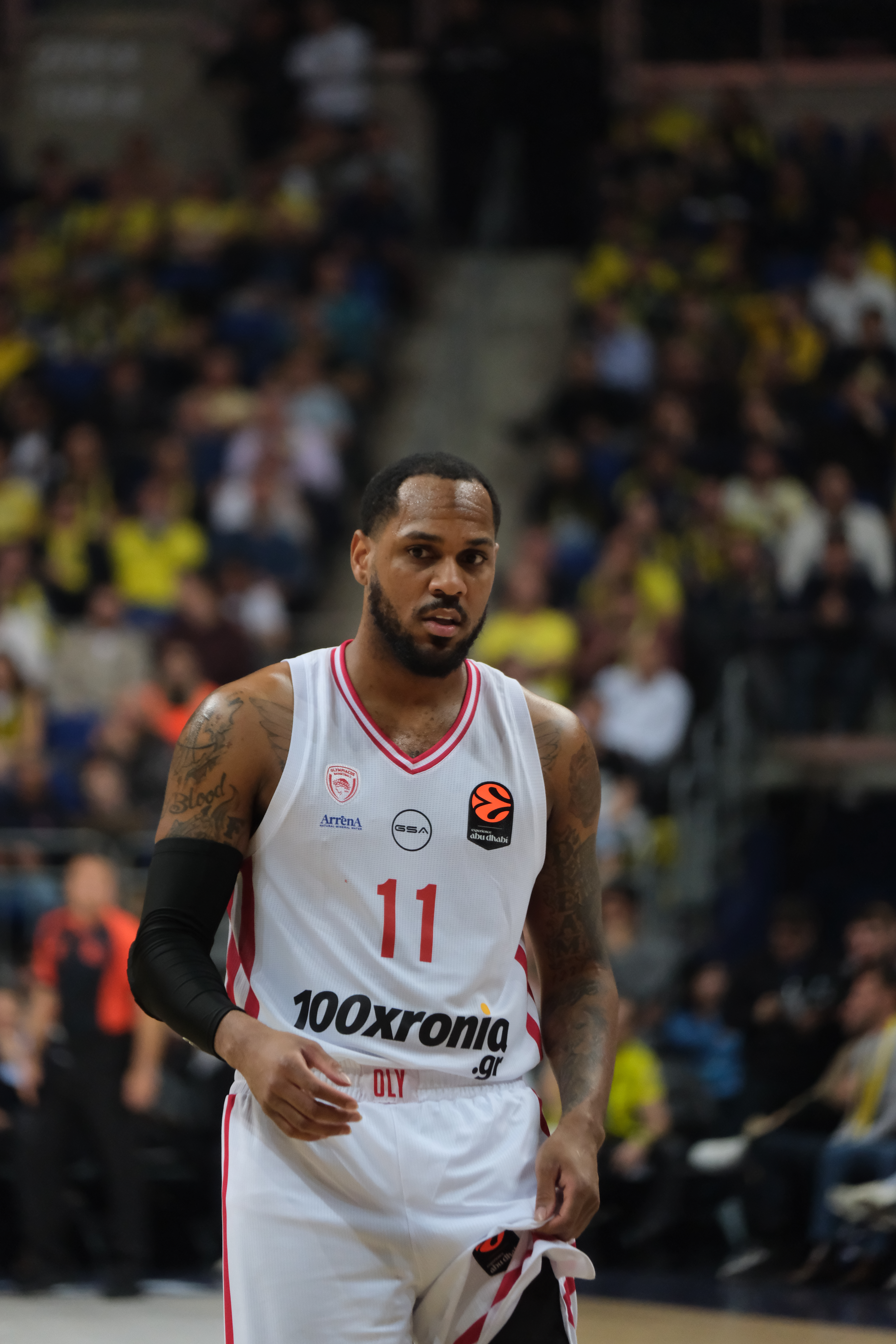
- Morris with Olympiacos in 2026

Free agent
- Position: Point guard

Personal information
- Born: June 27, 1995 (age 31) Grand Rapids, Michigan, U.S.
- Listed height: 6 ft 2 in (1.88 m)
- Listed weight: 183 lb (83 kg)

Career information
- High school: Flint Beecher (Flint, Michigan)
- College: Iowa State (2013–2017)
- NBA draft: 2017: 2nd round, 51st overall pick
- Drafted by: Denver Nuggets
- Playing career: 2017–present

Career history
- 2017–2022: Denver Nuggets
- 2017–2018: →Rio Grande Valley Vipers
- 2022–2023: Washington Wizards
- 2023–2024: Detroit Pistons
- 2024: Minnesota Timberwolves
- 2024–2025: Phoenix Suns
- 2025: Indiana Pacers
- 2025–2026: Olympiacos

Career highlights
- EuroLeague champion (2026); Greek League champion (2026); First-team All-Big 12 (2017); 2× Second-team All-Big 12 (2015, 2016); First-team Parade All-American (2013); Michigan Mr. Basketball (2013)
- Stats at NBA.com
- Stats at Basketball Reference

Monté Robert Morris (/ˈmɒnteɪ/ MON-tay; born June 27, 1995) is an American professional basketball player who last played for Olympiacos of the Greek Basketball League (GBL) and the EuroLeague. He played college basketball for the Iowa State Cyclones.

== Early life ==
Morris was born in Grand Rapids, Michigan and his mother is Latonia Morris. His mother nicknamed him "Man-Man" when he was born. He grew up in Flint, Michigan attending Flint Beecher High School. Morris was childhood friends with future NBA player and later NBA teammate, Kyle Kuzma, as both attended Dailey Elementary School. He was a four-year starter for the Beecher Buccaneers. Morris was a three-time winner of Michigan's Associated Press Class C Player of the Year Award and a three time all-state selection. He led the Buccaneers in scoring, assists, and steals in all four seasons. He led Flint Beecher to back-to-back Class C Michigan state titles in 2012 and 2013. One of the nation's best point guards, Morris won Michigan's Mr. Basketball award in 2013.

He was ranked No. 96 in the final Rivals.com national rankings and No. 89 in the Scout.com ratings as well as being a Parade All-American. Morris was recruited to Butler, Illinois, Indiana, Arizona State, Cincinnati, Georgia Tech, USC, and Iowa State which he ultimately committed to.

College recruiting information
Name	Hometown	School	Height	Weight	Commit date
Monte Morris; G	Flint, MI	Flint Beecher (MI)	6 ft 2 in (1.88 m)	170 lb (77 kg)	Jun 27, 2012
Monte Morris; G	Recruit ratings: Scout: Rivals: 247Sports: ESPN:				
Overall recruit ranking: Rivals: 96, 21 (G) ESPN: 84, 4 (MI), 17 (G)
Note: In many cases, Scout, Rivals, 247Sports, On3, and ESPN may conflict in their listings of height and weight.; In these cases, the average was taken. ESPN grades are on a 100-point scale.; Sources: "Iowa State 2013 Basketball Commitments". Rivals.; "2013 Iowa State Basketball Commits". Scout.; "ESPN". ESPN.; "Scout.com Team Recruiting Rankings". Scout.; "2013 Team Ranking". Rivals.

== College career ==
=== Freshman season ===
Morris started the season on the bench but worked his way into the starting line-up against the Oklahoma Sooners on February 1, 2014, staying there ever since. Morris averaged 6.8 points, 3.7 assists, and 2.6 rebounds and dished out 134 assists, the third most by any freshman in school history. He shot 84.7 percent (61–72) at the free-throw line, the second-best mark by an ISU freshman, and was the only Big 12 freshman to make at least 25 threes (28–69) and shoot over 40 percent. He scored double figures in 13 games, including all three games in the NCAA tournament. Morris tallied a season-high 15 points in the Cyclones' NCAA Tournament win against NCCU and followed that with 13 against the North Carolina Tar Heels. He dished out five or more assists in 12 games and led all Big 12 freshmen with 46 steals, the fifth most by an ISU rookie. His 1.3 steals per game ranked seventh in the Big 12, and he had an ISU freshman record of 12 assists with no turnovers against West Virginia. He played 52 minutes of turnover-free basketball in ISU's triple-OT win at Oklahoma State and had 10 points and five assists, including the game-winning 3-pointer with 43 seconds left in the third overtime against the Cowboys. He broke the NCAA record and led the nation with a 4.79 assist-to-turnover ratio, including a 6.9 assist-to-turnover ratio in Big 12 play.

=== Sophomore season ===
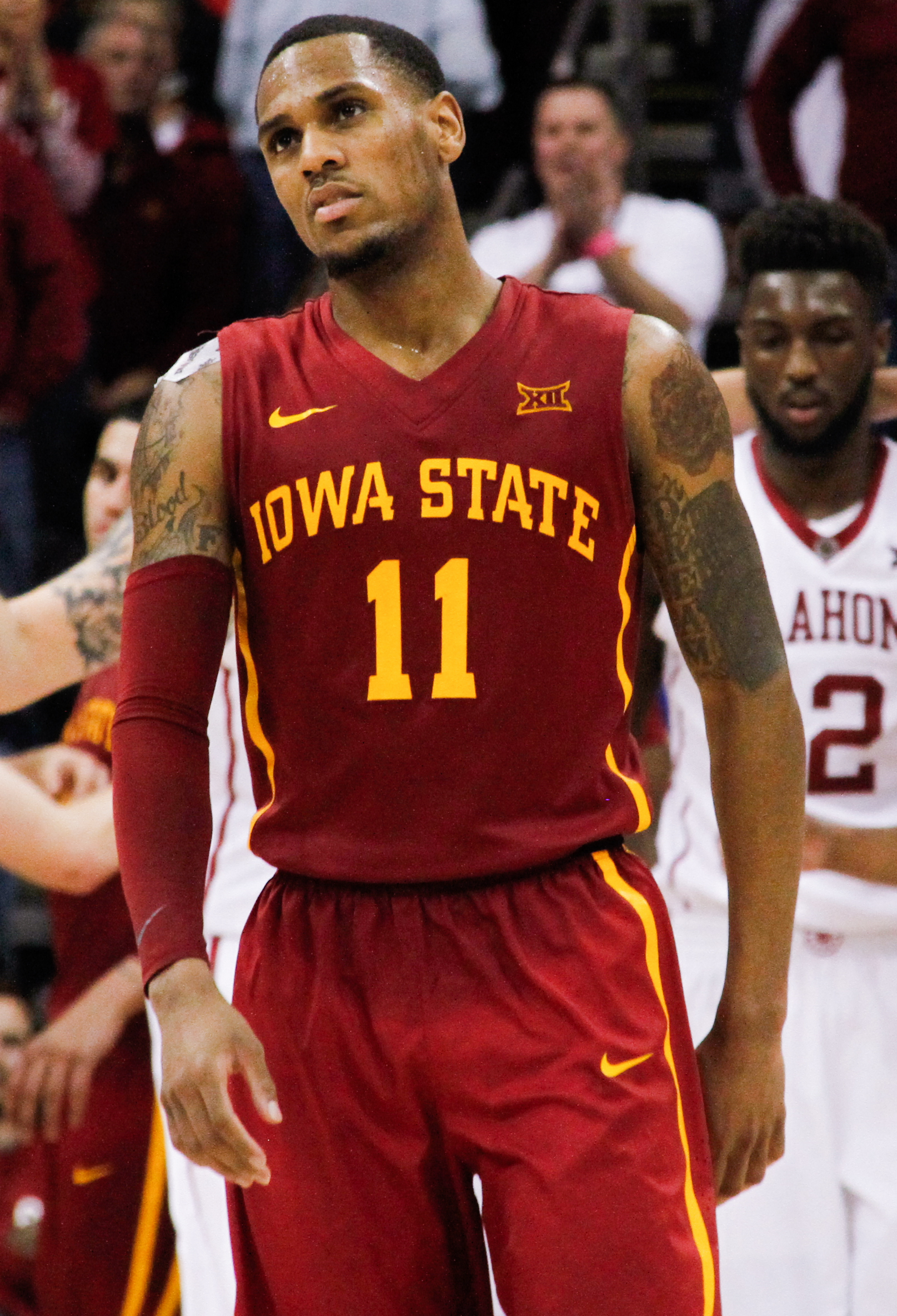
Morris in 2016

Morris started all 34 games and averaged 11.9 points, second on the team. He also posted a Big 12-best 5.2 assists and 3.4 rebounds on his way to earning All-Big 12 Second-Team honors. He had second-most assists of any sophomore and 11th-most by any player in school history. Morris was second in the Big 12 in field goal percentage shooting 50.7 percent from the field, had 64 steals, the second-most by a sophomore and tied for the ninth-most by any player in a single season in school history. His 110 steals in the last two seasons were the most by any Big 12 player. His first-career 20-point game came against Texas Tech, he recorded his first double-double and just missed a triple-double with 11 points, 10 assists and seven rebounds against Kansas. He tallied a career-high 24 points and hit a buzzer-beating 17-foot fadeaway to beat Texas in Big 12 quarterfinals. He averaged 15.3 points to earn Big 12 All-Tournament team honors as the Cyclones won the Big 12 tournament for the second consecutive season and he did not commit a turnover in three games at the Big 12 Championship. He led the nation for the second consecutive season with a 4.63 assist-to-turnover ratio and finished season with 176 assists and just 38 turnovers.

=== Junior season ===
On February 1, 2016, he was named one of 10 finalists for the Bob Cousy Point Guard of the Year Award. He was named to the 35-man midseason watchlist for the Naismith Trophy on February 11.

=== Senior season ===
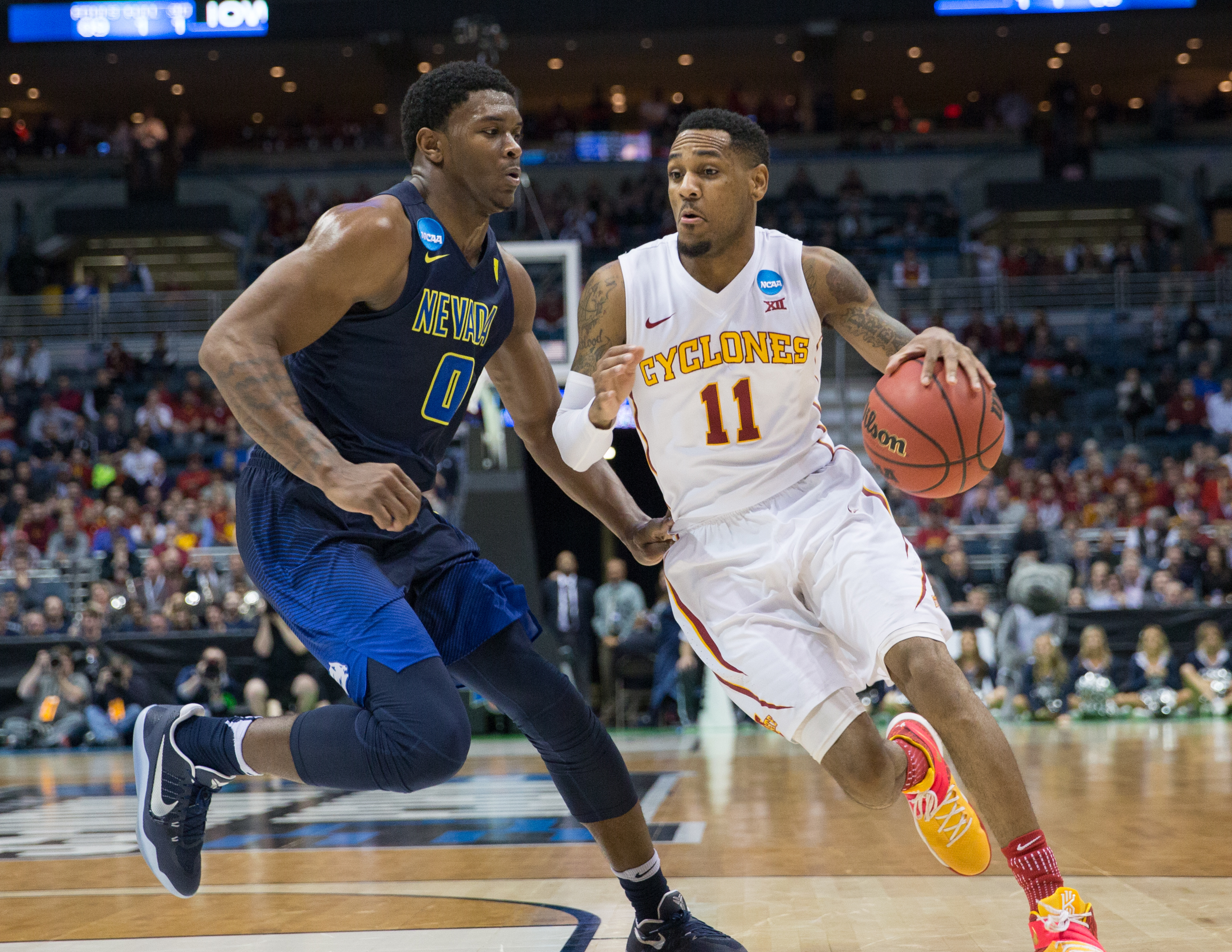
Morris competing against Nevada in the NCAA tournament

Morris received preseason recognition on November 2, 2016, as the Associated Press named him to the preseason All-American team. At the end of his senior season, Morris broke the NCAA record assist-to-turnover ratio from 4.79 he set his freshman year to the new record of 5.21. In 2017, Morris led Iowa State to a 5th seed in the NCAA tournament and got into the second round before losing to Purdue.

== Professional career ==
=== Denver Nuggets (2017–2022) ===
Morris was selected in the second round, 51st pick overall by the Denver Nuggets in the 2017 NBA draft. Following the Summer League he signed a two-way contract with the Nuggets. Under the terms of the deal he would split time between the Nuggets and a G League team that would be best designated for him. For Morris, he was assigned to the Rio Grande Valley Vipers of the NBA G League on October 23, 2017. On December 12, 2017, Morris made his NBA debut against the Detroit Pistons. He recorded an assist in three minutes of action. In three games with the Nuggets, he averaged 3.3 points per game. Morris averaged 18.0 points, 4.5 rebounds, and 6.6 assists per game with Rio Grande Valley. Following the season, Morris would sign a three-year, $4.7 million standard contract.

On December 9, 2020, Morris signed a three-year, $27 million extension through the 2023–24 season.

On December 29, 2020, Morris scored a career-high 24 points in a 125–115 loss to the Sacramento Kings.

On February 16, 2022, Morris scored 13 points, including a game-winning three-point shot as time expired, in a 117–116 win over the Golden State Warriors.

=== Washington Wizards (2022–2023) ===
On July 6, 2022, Morris was traded, alongside Will Barton, to the Washington Wizards in exchange for Kentavious Caldwell-Pope and Ish Smith. Morris made his Wizards debut on October 19, recording seven points, six rebounds, six assists and two steals in a 114–107 win over the Indiana Pacers.

=== Detroit Pistons (2023–2024) ===
On July 6, 2023, Morris was traded to the Detroit Pistons in exchange for a future second-round pick. Due to a lengthy recovery from a quadriceps injury to begin the 2023–24 season, Morris played in just six games for the Pistons before being dealt away at the NBA trade deadline.

=== Minnesota Timberwolves (2024) ===
On February 8, 2024, Morris was traded to the Minnesota Timberwolves in exchange for Troy Brown Jr., Shake Milton and a 2030 second-round pick.

=== Phoenix Suns (2024–2025) ===
On July 5, 2024, Morris signed with the Phoenix Suns on a minimum deal. He made 45 appearances for the Suns during the 2024–25 NBA season, averaging 5.2 points, 1.5 rebounds, and 1.6 assists.

=== Indiana Pacers (2025) ===
On September 23, 2025, Morris agreed to a contract with the Indiana Pacers. However, two days later it was announced that the team would not sign Morris due to a calf strain. On November 6, Morris officially signed with the Pacers following the release of Mac McClung. Morris was waived by the Pacers on November 20.

=== Olympiacos (2025–2026) ===
On December 10, 2025, Morris signed with Olympiacos of the Greek Basketball League (GBL) and the EuroLeague until the end of the season. On July 2, 2026, the team officially announced they had parted ways with Morris.

== National team career ==
On March 20, 2021, Morris committed to play for the Nigerian national team as a naturalized player.

== Career statistics ==
Legend
GP	Games played	GS	Games started	MPG	Minutes per game
FG%	Field goal percentage	3P%	3-point field goal percentage	FT%	Free throw percentage
RPG	Rebounds per game	APG	Assists per game	SPG	Steals per game
BPG	Blocks per game	PPG	Points per game	**Bold**	Career high
*	Led the league

=== NBA ===
==== Regular season ====
Year	Team	GP	GS	MPG	FG%	3P%	FT%	RPG	APG	SPG	BPG	PPG
2017–18	Denver	3	0	8.4	**.667**	.000	**1.000**	.7	2.3	**1.0**	.0	3.3
2018–19	Denver	**82***	6	24.0	.493	.414	.802	2.4	3.6	.9	.0	10.4
2019–20	Denver	73	12	22.4	.459	.378	.843	1.9	3.5	.8	.2	9.0
2020–21	Denver	47	13	25.5	.481	.381	.795	2.0	3.2	.7	**.3**	10.2
2021–22	Denver	75	**74**	**29.9**	.484	.396	.869	3.0	4.4	.7	.2	**12.6**
2022–23	Washington	62	61	27.4	.480	.382	.831	**3.4**	**5.3**	.7	.2	10.3
2023–24	Detroit	6	0	11.4	.364	.182	.500	2.0	1.3	.2	.2	4.5
2023–24	Minnesota	27	0	15.1	.417	**.424**	.706	1.7	2.3	.7	**.3**	5.1
2024–25	Phoenix	45	0	12.7	.426	.360	.857	1.5	1.6	.4	.1	5.2
2025–26	Indiana	6	0	10.8	.350	.250	.500	1.2	1.5	.2	.2	3.0
Career		426	166	23.2	.473	.388	.824	2.3	3.6	.7	.2	9.4

==== Playoffs ====
Year	Team	GP	GS	MPG	FG%	3P%	FT%	RPG	APG	SPG	BPG	PPG
2019	Denver	14	0	16.0	.384	.000	.692	1.4	2.6	.4	.1	5.4
2020	Denver	**19**	4	21.4	**.496**	.300	.824	1.5	2.7	.6	.1	9.1
2021	Denver	10	1	28.6	.431	.400	.724	**2.4**	**5.5**	1.0	**.2**	13.7
2022	Denver	5	**5**	**31.1**	.490	**.423**	.750	2.2	5.4	**1.2**	.0	**14.0**
2024	Minnesota	9	0	7.4	.300	.071	**1.000**	.7	1.0	.2	.1	2.3
Career		57	10	20.0	.440	.301	.767	1.6	3.1	.6	.1	8.3

=== College ===
Year	Team	GP	GS	MPG	FG%	3P%	FT%	RPG	APG	SPG	BPG	PPG
2013–14	Iowa State	**36**	17	28.1	.430	**.406**	**.847**	2.6	3.7	1.3	.2	6.8
2014–15	Iowa State	34	**34**	33.9	**.507**	.395	.753	3.4	5.2	**1.9**	**.4**	11.9
2015–16	Iowa State	35	35	**38.0**	.487	.358	.729	3.9	**6.9**	1.8	.3	13.8
2016–17	Iowa State	35	35	35.3	.465	.378	.802	**4.8**	6.2	1.5	.3	**16.4**
Career		140	121	33.8	.476	.381	.780	3.7	5.5	1.6	.3	12.2
