= 2019–20 Denver Nuggets season =

American professional basketball season

- Division champions
- Head coach: Michael Malone
- President: Tim Connelly
- General manager: Artūras Karnišovas (until April 7, 2020); Calvin Booth (from July 7, 2020)
- Owners: Ann Walton Kroenke
- Arena: Pepsi Center

Results
- Record: 46–27 (.630)
- Place: Division: 1st (Northwest); Conference: 3rd (Western)
- Playoff finish: Conference finals (lost to Lakers 1–4)
- Stats at Basketball Reference

Local media
- Television: Altitude Sports and Entertainment
- Radio: KKSE

The 2019–20 Denver Nuggets season was the 44th season of the franchise in the National Basketball Association (NBA), and the franchise's 53rd season of existence overall.

The season was suspended by the league officials following the games of March 11 after it was reported that Rudy Gobert tested positive for COVID-19. On March 19, the Nuggets announced that one person from the team tested positive for COVID-19. The Nuggets were one of the 22 teams invited to the NBA Bubble on June 4.

In the playoffs, the Nuggets became the first team in playoffs history to come back from a 3–1 series deficit twice in the same playoff run. The Nuggets defeated the Utah Jazz in the first round in seven games, recovering from a 3–1 series deficit and advancing to the semifinals against the Los Angeles Clippers, whom they last faced in the playoffs in 2006. The Nuggets defeated the Los Angeles Clippers in the conference semifinals, also recovering from a 3–1 series deficit, where they subsequently advanced to the conference finals. In achieving this feat, the Nuggets became the first team in NBA history to ever recover from two 3–1 series deficits in the same postseason to advance to the next round; no previous team had ever even forced two Game 7s in that situation. The Nuggets advanced to their first Conference Finals since the 2008–09 season and faced the Los Angeles Lakers in a rematch of that series, in which the Lakers won in six games. This time, the Nuggets lost in five games and like 2009, the Lakers went on to win the championship. The Nuggets would eventually get their revenge in the 2023 conference finals, when they swept the Lakers and eventually won an NBA championship of their own.

== Draft ==
The Denver Nuggets did not hold any picks for the 2019 NBA Draft, but traded for the 44th pick from the Miami Heat, who selected center Bol Bol.

== Roster ==
2019–20 Denver Nuggets roster
Players

Pos.	No.	Player	Height	Weight	DOB	From
G	5	Will Barton	6 ft 5 in (1.96 m)	181 lb (82 kg)	1991–01–06	Memphis
F	6	Keita Bates-Diop	6 ft 8 in (2.03 m)	229 lb (104 kg)	1996–01–23	Ohio State
F/C	10	Bol Bol (TW)	7 ft 2 in (2.18 m)	220 lb (100 kg)	1999–11–16	Oregon
F	31	Vlatko Čančar	6 ft 8 in (2.03 m)	236 lb (107 kg)	1997–04–10	Slovenia
F	25	Tyler Cook (TW)	6 ft 8 in (2.03 m)	255 lb (116 kg)	1997–09–23	Iowa
F	3	Torrey Craig	6 ft 7 in (2.01 m)	221 lb (100 kg)	1990–12–19	USC Upstate
G	30	Troy Daniels	6 ft 4 in (1.93 m)	200 lb (91 kg)	1991–06–15	VCU
G/F	35	PJ Dozier	6 ft 6 in (1.98 m)	205 lb (93 kg)	1996–10–25	South Carolina
F	9	Jerami Grant	6 ft 8 in (2.03 m)	210 lb (95 kg)	1994–03–12	Syracuse
G	14	Gary Harris	6 ft 4 in (1.93 m)	210 lb (95 kg)	1994–09–14	Michigan State
C	15	Nikola Jokić	7 ft 0 in (2.13 m)	284 lb (129 kg)	1995–02–19	Serbia
F	4	Paul Millsap	6 ft 7 in (2.01 m)	257 lb (117 kg)	1985–02–10	Louisiana Tech
G	11	Monté Morris	6 ft 2 in (1.88 m)	183 lb (83 kg)	1995–06–27	Iowa State
G	27	Jamal Murray	6 ft 4 in (1.93 m)	215 lb (98 kg)	1997–02–23	Kentucky
F/C	7	Mason Plumlee	6 ft 11 in (2.11 m)	255 lb (116 kg)	1990–03–05	Duke
SF	1	Michael Porter	6 ft 10 in (2.08 m)	218 lb (99 kg)	1998–06–29	Missouri
F/C	32	Noah Vonleh	6 ft 10 in (2.08 m)	257 lb (117 kg)	1995–08–24	Indiana

Coaches
Head coach
- Michael Malone
Assistant(s)
- David Adelman
- Ryan Bowen
- John Beckett
- Jordi Fernández
- Charles Klask
- Ognjen Stojaković
- Wes Unseld Jr.
- Elvis Valcarcel

Legend
- (DP) Unsigned draft pick
- (FA) Free agent
- (S) Suspended
- (GL) On assignment to G League
- (TW) Two-way affiliate player
- Injured

Roster
Updated: 2020–06–26

== Standings ==
=== Division ===
Northwest Division	W	L	PCT	GB	Home	Road	Div	GP
y – Denver Nuggets	46	27	.630	–	26‍–‍11	20‍–‍16	12–2	73
x – Oklahoma City Thunder	44	28	.611	1.5	23‍–‍14	21‍–‍14	8–5	72
x – Utah Jazz	44	28	.611	1.5	23‍–‍12	21‍–‍16	5–7	72
x – Portland Trail Blazers	35	39	.473	11.5	21‍–‍15	14‍–‍24	5–8	74
Minnesota Timberwolves	19	45	.297	22.5	8‍–‍24	11‍–‍21	2–10	64

=== Conference ===
Western Conference
#	Team	W	L	PCT	GB	GP
1	c – Los Angeles Lakers *	52	19	.732	–	71
2	x – Los Angeles Clippers	49	23	.681	3.5	72
3	y – Denver Nuggets *	46	27	.630	7.0	73
4	y – Houston Rockets *	44	28	.611	8.5	72
5	x – Oklahoma City Thunder	44	28	.611	8.5	72
6	x – Utah Jazz	44	28	.611	8.5	72
7	x – Dallas Mavericks	43	32	.573	11.0	75
8	x – Portland Trail Blazers	35	39	.473	18.5	74
9	pi – Memphis Grizzlies	34	39	.466	19.0	73
10	Phoenix Suns	34	39	.466	19.0	73
11	San Antonio Spurs	32	39	.451	20.0	71
12	Sacramento Kings	31	41	.431	21.5	72
13	New Orleans Pelicans	30	42	.417	22.5	72
14	Minnesota Timberwolves	19	45	.297	29.5	64
15	Golden State Warriors	15	50	.231	34.0	65

== Game log ==
=== Preseason ===
The preseason schedule was announced on July 23, 2019.

2019 preseason game log
Total: 4–0 (home: 1–0; road: 3–0)
Preseason: 4–0 (home: 1–0; road: 3–0)

Game	Date	Team	Score	High points	High rebounds	High assists	Location Attendance	Record
1	October 8	@ Portland	W 105–94	Paul Millsap (14)	Millsap, Plumlee, Beasley, Craig, Vanderbilt (5)	Monté Morris (4)	Veterans Memorial Coliseum; 10,942	1–0
2	October 10	@ LA Clippers	W 111–91	Malik Beasley (16)	Nikola Jokić (11)	Mason Plumlee (6)	Staples Center; 15,778	2–0
3	October 14	@ Phoenix	W 107–102	Jerami Grant (22)	Jamal Murray (8)	Murray, Plumlee (6)	Talking Stick Resort Arena; 8,075	3–0
4	October 17	Portland	W 110–104	Millsap, Barton (13)	Mason Plumlee (6)	Jamal Murray (6)	Pepsi Center; 14,424	4–0

2019–20 season schedule

=== Regular season ===
2019–20 game log
Total: 46–27 (home: 26–11; road: 20–16)
October: 3–2 (home: 1–1; road: 2–1)

Game	Date	Team	Score	High points	High rebounds	High assists	Location Attendance	Record
1	October 23	@ Portland	W 108–100	Nikola Jokić (20)	Nikola Jokić (13)	Jamal Murray (6)	Moda Center; 19,991	1–0
2	October 25	Phoenix	W 108–107 (OT)	Jamal Murray (27)	Nikola Jokić (14)	Nikola Jokić (12)	Pepsi Center; 19,557	2–0
3	October 28	@ Sacramento	W 101–94	Jamal Murray (18)	Nikola Jokić (13)	Barton, Murray, Grant, Plumlee (3)	Golden 1 Center; 15,870	3–0
4	October 29	Dallas	L 106–109	Paul Millsap (23)	Will Barton (11)	Nikola Jokić (10)	Pepsi Center; 16,605	3–1
5	October 31	@ New Orleans	L 107–122	Michael Porter Jr. (15)	Mason Plumlee (7)	Murray, Jokić (6)	Smoothie King Center; 16,613	3–2

November: 10–2 (home: 7–1; road: 3–1)

Game	Date	Team	Score	High points	High rebounds	High assists	Location Attendance	Record
6	November 2	@ Orlando	W 91–87	Jamal Murray (22)	Paul Millsap (11)	Harris, Jokić (4)	Amway Center; 17,025	4–2
7	November 5	Miami	W 109–89	Jamal Murray (21)	Will Barton (10)	Monté Morris (8)	Pepsi Center; 18,010	5–2
8	November 8	Philadelphia	W 100–97	Nikola Jokić (26)	Nikola Jokić (11)	Jamal Murray (11)	Pepsi Center; 19,520	6–2
9	November 10	@ Minnesota	W 100–98 (OT)	Nikola Jokić (20)	Will Barton (12)	Nikola Jokić (7)	Target Center; 13,553	7–2
10	November 12	Atlanta	L 121–125	Will Barton (21)	Will Barton (9)	Jamal Murray (8)	Pepsi Center; 18,327	7–3
11	November 14	Brooklyn	W 101–93	Jokić, Millsap (18)	Nikola Jokić (10)	Monté Morris (7)	Pepsi Center; 18,394	8–3
12	November 17	@ Memphis	W 131–114	Jamal Murray (39)	Mason Plumlee (7)	Jokić, Murray (8)	FedEx Forum; 14,227	9–3
13	November 20	Houston	W 105–95	Nikola Jokić (27)	Nikola Jokić (12)	Jamal Murray (9)	Pepsi Center; 17,778	10–3
14	November 22	Boston	W 96–92	Jamal Murray (22)	Nikola Jokić (16)	Nikola Jokić (10)	Pepsi Center; 19,520	11–3
15	November 24	Phoenix	W 116–104	Paul Millsap (23)	Nikola Jokić (13)	Nikola Jokić (5)	Pepsi Center; 19,520	12–3
16	November 26	Washington	W 117–104	Jerami Grant (20)	Nikola Jokić (20)	Will Barton (8)	Pepsi Center; 18,673	13–3
17	November 30	@ Sacramento	L 97–100 (OT)	Gary Harris (25)	Will Barton (12)	Jokić, Murray (6)	Golden 1 Center; 17,583	13–4

December: 10–6 (home: 7–2; road: 3–4)

Game	Date	Team	Score	High points	High rebounds	High assists	Location Attendance	Record
18	December 3	L. A. Lakers	L 96–105	Jamal Murray (22)	Paul Millsap (8)	Nikola Jokić (8)	Pepsi Center; 19,658	13–5
19	December 5	@ New York	W 129–92	Will Barton (17)	Mason Plumlee (11)	Nikola Jokić (8)	Madison Square Garden; 18,171	14–5
20	December 6	@ Boston	L 95–108	Nikola Jokić (30)	Nikola Jokić (10)	Harris, Jokić (4)	TD Garden; 19,156	14–6
21	December 8	@ Brooklyn	L 102–105	Nikola Jokić (24)	Nikola Jokić (11)	Nikola Jokić (6)	Barclays Center; 16,679	14–7
22	December 10	@ Philadelphia	L 92–97	Will Barton (26)	Barton, Jokić (7)	Nikola Jokić (11)	Wells Fargo Center; 20,591	14–8
23	December 12	Portland	W 114–99	Grant, Jokić (20)	Barton, Jokić (11)	Monte Morris (7)	Pepsi Center; 18,828	15–8
24	December 14	Oklahoma City	W 110–102	Nikola Jokić (28)	Nikola Jokić (14)	Nikola Jokić (12)	Pepsi Center; 19,520	16–8
25	December 15	New York	W 111–105	Nikola Jokić (25)	Nikola Jokić (10)	Mason Plumlee (6)	Pepsi Center; 18,867	17–8
26	December 18	Orlando	W 113–104	Jamal Murray (33)	Paul Millsap (12)	Nikola Jokić (12)	Pepsi Center; 18,182	18–8
27	December 20	Minnesota	W 109–100	Jamal Murray (28)	Nikola Jokić (10)	Nikola Jokić (10)	Pepsi Center; 19,520	19–8
28	December 22	@ L. A. Lakers	W 128–104	Paul Millsap (21)	Will Barton (13)	Barton, Harris, Jokić, Murray, Plumlee (5)	Staples Center; 18,997	20–8
29	December 23	@ Phoenix	W 113–111	Jamal Murray (28)	Nikola Jokić (12)	Nikola Jokić (10)	Talking Stick Resort Arena; 16,041	21–8
30	December 25	New Orleans	L 100–112	Nikola Jokić (23)	Nikola Jokić (10)	Monte Morris (6)	Pepsi Center; 19,520	21–9
31	December 28	Memphis	W 119–110	Nikola Jokić (31)	Nikola Jokić (10)	Nikola Jokić (10)	Pepsi Center; 19,697	22–9
32	December 29	Sacramento	W 120–115	Barton, Porter Jr. (19)	Nikola Jokić (8)	Jamal Murray (7)	Pepsi Center; 19,520	23–9
33	December 31	@ Houston	L 104–130	Nikola Jokić (21)	Barton, Millsap (9)	Will Barton (7)	Toyota Center; 18,055	23–10

January: 11–5 (home: 4–2; road: 7–3)

Game	Date	Team	Score	High points	High rebounds	High assists	Location Attendance	Record
34	January 2	@ Indiana	W 124–116	Michael Porter Jr. (25)	Will Barton (10)	Jamal Murray (7)	Bankers Life Fieldhouse; 16,688	24–10
35	January 4	@ Washington	L 114–128	Jamal Murray (39)	Nikola Jokić (10)	Jokić, Murray (4)	Capital One Arena; 16,233	24–11
36	January 6	@ Atlanta	W 123–115	Nikola Jokić (47)	Will Barton (9)	Jamal Murray (8)	State Farm Arena; 15,286	25–11
37	January 8	@ Dallas	W 107–106	Nikola Jokić (33)	Juan Hernangómez (7)	Nikola Jokić (7)	American Airlines Center; 20,314	26–11
38	January 11	Cleveland	L 103–111	Jamal Murray (24)	Nikola Jokić (12)	Nikola Jokić (5)	Pepsi Center; 19,533	26–12
39	January 12	L. A. Clippers	W 114–104	Nikola Jokić (20)	Nikola Jokić (15)	Jokić, Morris (6)	Pepsi Center; 19,520	27–12
40	January 15	Charlotte	W 100–86	Michael Porter Jr. (19)	Jokić, Porter Jr. (8)	Nikola Jokić (8)	Pepsi Center; 19,520	28–12
41	January 16	@ Golden State	W 134–131 (OT)	Will Barton (31)	Mason Plumlee (15)	Nikola Jokić (8)	Chase Center; 18,064	29–12
42	January 19	Indiana	L 107–115	Nikola Jokić (30)	Nikola Jokić (10)	Barton, Morris (5)	Pepsi Center; 19,520	29–13
43	January 20	@ Minnesota	W 107–100	Michael Porter Jr. (20)	Michael Porter Jr. (14)	Monte Morris (8)	Target Center; 12,172	30–13
44	January 22	@ Houston	L 105–121	Nikola Jokić (19)	Nikola Jokić (12)	Nikola Jokić (10)	Toyota Center; 18,055	30–14
45	January 24	@ New Orleans	W 113–106	Nikola Jokić (27)	Nikola Jokić (12)	Nikola Jokić (7)	Smoothie King Center; 16,398	31–14
46	January 26	Houston	W 117–110	Jerami Grant (25)	Nikola Jokić (12)	Nikola Jokić (11)	Pepsi Center; 19,520	32–14
47	January 28	@ Memphis	L 96–104	Nikola Jokić (25)	Nikola Jokić (13)	Monté Morris (6)	FedEx Forum; 14,365	32–15
48	January 30	Utah	W 106–100	Nikola Jokić (28)	Michael Porter Jr. (12)	Nikola Jokić (10)	Pepsi Center; 19,520	33–15
49	January 31	@ Milwaukee	W 127–115	Will Barton (24)	Michael Porter Jr. (11)	Nikola Jokić (9)	Fiserv Forum; 18,141	34–15

February: 6–4 (home: 4–1; road: 2–3)

Game	Date	Team	Score	High points	High rebounds	High assists	Location Attendance	Record
50	February 2	@ Detroit	L 123–128 (OT)	Nikola Jokić (39)	Nikola Jokić (10)	Nikola Jokić (11)	Little Caesars Arena; 15,488	34–16
51	February 4	Portland	W 127–99	Nikola Jokić (29)	Nikola Jokić (13)	Nikola Jokić (9)	Pepsi Center; 19,520	35–16
52	February 5	@ Utah	W 98–95	Jamal Murray (31)	Nikola Jokić (21)	Nikola Jokić (10)	Vivint Smart Home Arena; 18,306	36–16
53	February 8	@ Phoenix	W 117–108	Jamal Murray (36)	Paul Millsap (11)	Nikola Jokić (6)	Talking Stick Resort Arena; 16,843	37–16
54	February 10	San Antonio	W 127–120	Jamal Murray (26)	Nikola Jokić (8)	Nikola Jokić (13)	Pepsi Center; 19,520	38–16
55	February 12	L. A. Lakers	L 116–120 (OT)	Jamal Murray (32)	Nikola Jokić (11)	Jamal Murray (10)	Pepsi Center; 19,860	38–17
All-Star Break
56	February 21	@ Oklahoma City	L 101–113	Nikola Jokić (32)	Will Barton (9)	Barton, Jokić (5)	Chesapeake Energy Arena; 18,203	38–18
57	February 23	Minnesota	W 128–116	Paul Millsap (25)	Jokić, Millsap (7)	4 tied (6)	Pepsi Center; 19,626	39–18
58	February 25	Detroit	W 115–98	Jerami Grant (29)	Michael Porter Jr. (8)	Jamal Murray (8)	Pepsi Center; 19,143	40–18
59	February 28	@ L. A. Clippers	L 103–132	Nikola Jokić (21)	Nikola Jokić (9)	Will Barton (4)	Staples Center; 19,068	40–19

March: 3–3 (home: 2–1; road: 1–2)

Game	Date	Team	Score	High points	High rebounds	High assists	Location Attendance	Record
60	March 1	Toronto	W 133–118	Nikola Jokić (23)	Nikola Jokić (18)	Nikola Jokić (11)	Pepsi Center; 19,777	41–19
61	March 3	Golden State	L 100–116	Barton, Millsap (18)	Nikola Jokić (13)	Nikola Jokić (7)	Pepsi Center; 19,520	41–20
62	March 5	@ Charlotte	W 114–112	Jamal Murray (18)	Nikola Jokić (11)	Nikola Jokić (8)	Spectrum Center; 13,311	42–20
63	March 7	@ Cleveland	L 102–104	Will Barton (22)	Barton, Jokić (8)	Nikola Jokić (8)	Rocket Mortgage FieldHouse; 19,432	42–21
64	March 9	Milwaukee	W 109–95	Jamal Murray (21)	Paul Millsap (10)	Nikola Jokić (7)	Pepsi Center; 19,838	43–21
65	March 11	@ Dallas	L 97–113	Jamal Murray (25)	Nikola Jokić (13)	Nikola Jokić (8)	American Airlines Center; 20,302	43–22

Seeding games: 3–5 (home: 1–3; road: 2–2)

Game	Date	Team	Score	High points	High rebounds	High assists	Location Attendance	Record
66	August 1	Miami	L 105–125	Grant, Jokić (19)	Nikola Jokić (7)	Nikola Jokić (6)	HP Field House; No In-Person Attendance	43–23
67	August 3	@ Oklahoma City	W 121–113 (OT)	Michael Porter Jr. (37)	Jokić, Porter (12)	Nikola Jokić (10)	The Arena; No In-Person Attendance	44–23
68	August 5	@ San Antonio	W 132–126	Michael Porter Jr. (30)	Michael Porter Jr. (15)	Nikola Jokić (11)	Visa Athletic Center; No In-Person Attendance	45–23
69	August 6	Portland	L 115–125	Michael Porter Jr. (27)	Michael Porter Jr. (12)	Nikola Jokić (13)	Visa Athletic Center; No In-Person Attendance	45–24
70	August 8	Utah	W 134–132 (2OT)	Nikola Jokić (30)	Jamal Murray (12)	Jamal Murray (8)	The Arena; No In-Person Attendance	46–24
71	August 10	@ L. A. Lakers	L 121–124	PJ Dozier (18)	Bol Bol (5)	Mason Plumlee (5)	The Arena; No In-Person Attendance	46–25
72	August 12	L. A. Clippers	L 111–124	Jerami Grant (25)	Nikola Jokić (7)	Nikola Jokić (13)	The Arena; No In-Person Attendance	46–26
73	August 14	@ Toronto	L 109–117	PJ Dozier (20)	Bates-Diop, Morris (6)	PJ Dozier (8)	HP Field House; No In-Person Attendance	46–27

Cancelled games

Game	Date	Team	Score	High points	High rebounds	High assists	Location Attendance	Record
-	March 13	@ San Antonio					AT&T Center	
-	March 15	@ L.A. Lakers					Staples Center	
-	March 18	L.A. Clippers					Pepsi Center	
-	March 20	@ Oklahoma City					Chesapeake Energy Arena	
-	March 22	@ Toronto					Scotiabank Arena	
-	March 23	@ Chicago					United Center	
-	March 25	@ Miami					American Airlines Arena	
-	March 27	San Antonio					Pepsi Center	
-	March 30	Oklahoma City					Pepsi Center	
-	March 31	@ Golden State					Chase Center	
-	April 3	Chicago					Pepsi Center	
-	April 5	Utah					Pepsi Center	
-	April 7	Memphis					Pepsi Center	
-	April 9	@ Portland					Moda Center	
-	April 11	Sacramento					Pepsi Center	
-	April 13	Dallas					Pepsi Center	
-	April 14	@ Utah					Vivint Smart Home Arena	

2019–20 season schedule

=== Playoffs ===
2020 playoff game log
Total: 9–10 (home: 5–4; road: 4–6)
First round: 4–3 (home: 3–1; road: 1–2)

Game	Date	Team	Score	High points	High rebounds	High assists	Location Attendance	Series
1	August 17	Utah	W 135–125 (OT)	Jamal Murray (36)	Nikola Jokić (10)	Jamal Murray (9)	HP Field House; No in-person attendance	1–0
2	August 19	Utah	L 105–124	Jokić, Porter (28)	Nikola Jokić (11)	Nikola Jokić (6)	The Arena; No in-person attendance	1–1
3	August 21	@ Utah	L 87–124	Nikola Jokić (15)	Dozier, Plumlee (6)	Jokić, Murray (6)	The Arena; No in-person attendance	1–2
4	August 23	@ Utah	L 127–129	Jamal Murray (50)	Jamal Murray (11)	Jamal Murray (7)	The Arena; No in-person attendance	1–3
5	August 25	Utah	W 117–107	Jamal Murray (42)	Jamal Murray (8)	Jamal Murray (8)	HP Field House; No in-person attendance	2–3
6	August 30	@ Utah	W 119–107	Jamal Murray (50)	Michael Porter Jr. (12)	Nikola Jokić (9)	The Arena; No in-person attendance	3–3
7	September 1	Utah	W 80–78	Nikola Jokić (30)	Nikola Jokić (14)	Monté Morris (5)	The Arena; No in-person attendance	4–3

Conference semifinals: 4–3 (home: 1–2; road: 3–1)

Game	Date	Team	Score	High points	High rebounds	High assists	Location Attendance	Series
1	September 3	@ L. A. Clippers	L 97–120	Nikola Jokić (15)	Paul Millsap (9)	Jamal Murray (6)	AdventHealth Arena; No in-person attendance	0–1
2	September 5	@ L. A. Clippers	W 110–101	Jamal Murray (27)	Nikola Jokić (18)	Jamal Murray (6)	AdventHealth Arena; No in-person attendance	1–1
3	September 7	L. A. Clippers	L 107–113	Nikola Jokić (32)	Nikola Jokić (12)	Jamal Murray (9)	AdventHealth Arena; No in-person attendance	1–2
4	September 9	L. A. Clippers	L 85–96	Nikola Jokić (26)	Nikola Jokić (11)	Jamal Murray (7)	AdventHealth Arena; No in-person attendance	1–3
5	September 11	@ L. A. Clippers	W 111–105	Jamal Murray (26)	Nikola Jokić (14)	Jamal Murray (7)	HP Field House; No in-person attendance	2–3
6	September 13	L. A. Clippers	W 111–98	Nikola Jokić (34)	Nikola Jokić (14)	Nikola Jokić (7)	AdventHealth Arena; No in-person attendance	3–3
7	September 15	@ L. A. Clippers	W 104–89	Jamal Murray (40)	Nikola Jokić (22)	Nikola Jokić (13)	AdventHealth Arena; No in-person attendance	4–3

Conference finals: 1–4 (home: 1–1; road: 0–3)

Game	Date	Team	Score	High points	High rebounds	High assists	Location Attendance	Series
1	September 18	@ L. A. Lakers	L 114–126	Jokić, Murray (21)	Michael Porter Jr. (10)	Jamal Murray (5)	The Arena; No In-Person Attendance	0–1
2	September 20	@ L. A. Lakers	L 103–105	Nikola Jokić (30)	Paul Millsap (8)	Nikola Jokić (9)	The Arena; No In-Person Attendance	0–2
3	September 22	L. A. Lakers	W 114–106	Jamal Murray (28)	Nikola Jokić (10)	Jamal Murray (12)	The Arena; No In-Person Attendance	1–2
4	September 24	L. A. Lakers	L 108–114	Jamal Murray (32)	Michael Porter Jr. (8)	Jamal Murray (8)	The Arena; No In-Person Attendance	1–3
5	September 26	@ L. A. Lakers	L 107–117	Grant, Jokić (20)	Jerami Grant (9)	Jamal Murray (8)	The Arena; No In-Person Attendance	1–4

2020 playoff schedule

== Player statistics ==
Legend
GP	Games played	GS	Games started	MPG	Minutes per game
FG%	Field-goal percentage	3P%	3-point field-goal percentage	FT%	Free-throw percentage
RPG	Rebounds per game	APG	Assists per game	SPG	Steals per game
BPG	Blocks per game	PPG	Points per game

=== Regular season ===
Denver Nuggets statistics
Player	GP	GS	MPG	FG%	3P%	FT%	RPG	APG	SPG	BPG	PPG
Will Barton	58	58	33.0	.450	.375	.767	6.3	3.7	1.1	.5	15.1
Keita Bates-Diop	7	0	14.0	.464	.333	.800	2.4	.0	.3	.6	5.3
Malik Beasley	41	0	18.2	.389	.360	.868	1.9	1.2	.8	.1	7.9
Bol Bol	7	0	12.4	.500	.444	.800	2.7	.9	.3	.9	5.7
Vlatko Čančar	14	0	3.2	.400	.167	1.000	.7	.2	.1	.1	1.2
Tyler Cook	2	0	9.5	.500	.000	1.000	2.0	.0	1.0	.0	2.0
Torrey Craig	58	27	18.5	.461	.326	.611	3.3	.8	.4	.6	5.4
Troy Daniels	6	0	12.7	.357	.300	.000	1.0	.5	.5	.0	4.3
PJ Dozier	29	0	14.2	.414	.347	.724	1.9	2.2	.5	.2	5.8
Jerami Grant	71	24	26.6	.478	.389	.750	3.5	1.2	.7	.8	12.0
Gary Harris	56	55	31.8	.420	.333	.815	2.9	2.1	1.4	.3	10.4
Juan Hernangómez	34	0	12.4	.345	.250	.640	2.8	.6	.1	.1	3.1
Nikola Jokić	73	73	32.0	.528	.314	.817	9.7	7.0	1.2	.6	19.9
Jordan McRae	4	0	8.0	.333	.500	.750	1.3	1.0	.5	.3	2.3
Paul Millsap	51	48	24.3	.482	.435	.816	5.7	1.6	.9	.6	11.6
Monté Morris	73	12	22.4	.459	.378	.843	1.9	3.5	.8	.2	9.0
Jamal Murray	59	59	32.3	.456	.346	.881	4.0	4.8	1.1	.3	18.5
Mason Plumlee	61	1	17.3	.615	.000	.535	5.2	2.5	.5	.6	7.2
Michael Porter	55	8	16.4	.509	.422	.833	4.7	.8	.5	.5	9.3
Jarred Vanderbilt	9	0	4.6	.714	.000	.000	.9	.2	.3	.1	1.1
Noah Vonleh	7	0	4.3	.833	1.000	.500	1.1	.3	.0	.0	1.9

=== Playoffs ===
Denver Nuggets statistics
Player	GP	GS	MPG	FG%	3P%	FT%	RPG	APG	SPG	BPG	PPG
Keita Bates-Diop	5	0	4.8	.200	.000	.500	1.2	.2	.0	.0	.6
Bol Bol	4	0	5.3	.556	.667	.875	1.3	.0	.5	.5	4.8
Tyler Cook	1	4.0	.000	.000	.000	2.0	.0	.0	.0	.0	.0
Torrey Craig	19	3	19.7	.423	.262	.692	3.3	.7	.4	.4	4.5
Troy Daniels	6	0	5.0	.500	.500	.500	.5	.3	.0	.0	2.7
PJ Dozier	12	0	10.4	.424	.250	.571	1.5	1.0	.2	.2	3.2
Jerami Grant	19	16	34.4	.406	.326	.889	3.3	1.3	.6	.8	11.6
Gary Harris	14	12	27.1	.378	.365	.773	2.0	1.7	1.1	.3	7.4
Nikola Jokić	19	19	35.5	.519	.429	.835	9.8	5.7	1.1	.8	24.4
Paul Millsap	19	19	24.2	.398	.341	.796	4.7	1.2	.6	.5	8.0
Monté Morris	19	4	21.4	.496	.300	.824	1.5	2.7	.6	.1	9.1
Jamal Murray	19	19	39.6	.505	.453	.897	4.8	6.6	.9	.3	26.5
Mason Plumlee	19	0	10.9	.487	.000	.667	3.2	1.3	.2	.4	2.4
Michael Porter	19	3	23.8	.476	.382	.743	6.7	.8	.7	.3	11.4
Noah Vonleh	1	0	3.0	.000	.000	.000	.0	.0	.0	.0	.0

== Transactions ==
=== Trades ===
June 20, 2019
To Denver Nuggets

Draft rights to Bol Bol
To Miami Heat

2022 second-round pick
Cash considerations
July 8, 2019
To Denver Nuggets

Jerami Grant
To Oklahoma City Thunder

2020 first-round pick
February 5, 2020
To Denver Nuggets

- Keita Bates-Diop (from Minnesota)
- Shabazz Napier (from Minnesota)
- Noah Vonleh (from Minnesota)
- Gerald Green (from Houston)
- 2020 HOU first-round pick
To Atlanta Hawks

- Clint Capela (from Houston)
- Nene Hilario (from Houston)
To Houston Rockets

- Robert Covington (from Minnesota)
- Jordan Bell (from Minnesota)
- 2024 ATL Second-round pick
To Minnesota Timberwolves

- Malik Beasley (from Denver)
- Juan Hernangómez (from Denver)
- Jarred Vanderbilt (from Denver)
- Evan Turner (from Atlanta)
- 2020 ATL first-round pick
February 6, 2020
To Denver Nuggets

Jordan McRae
To Washington Wizards

Shabazz Napier

=== Contracts ===
==== Re-signed ====
Player	Signed
Jamal Murray	July 24, 2019

==== Additions ====
Player	Signed	Former Team
Vlatko Čančar	August 2, 2019	(Spain) San Pablo Burgos
Tyler Cook	August 13, 2019; Two-way contract	Iowa
PJ Dozier	August 13, 2019; Two-way contract	Boston Celtics
Bol Bol	September 6, 2019; Two-way contract	Oregon
Troy Daniels	March 5, 2020	Los Angeles Lakers
Tyler Cook	June 30, 2020; Two-way contract	Oklahoma City Blue

==== Subtractions ====
Player	Reason Left	New Team
Isaiah Thomas	Free agent	Washington Wizards
Trey Lyles	Free agent	San Antonio Spurs
Tyler Lydon	Free agent	Sacramento Kings
Thomas Welsh	Waived	Charlotte Hornets
Brandon Goodwin	Free agent	Atlanta Hawks
Tyler Cook	Waived	Cleveland Cavaliers
Gerald Green	Waived	Free agent
Jordan McRae	Waived	Detroit Pistons
