= Tyler Cook =

American basketball player (born 1997)

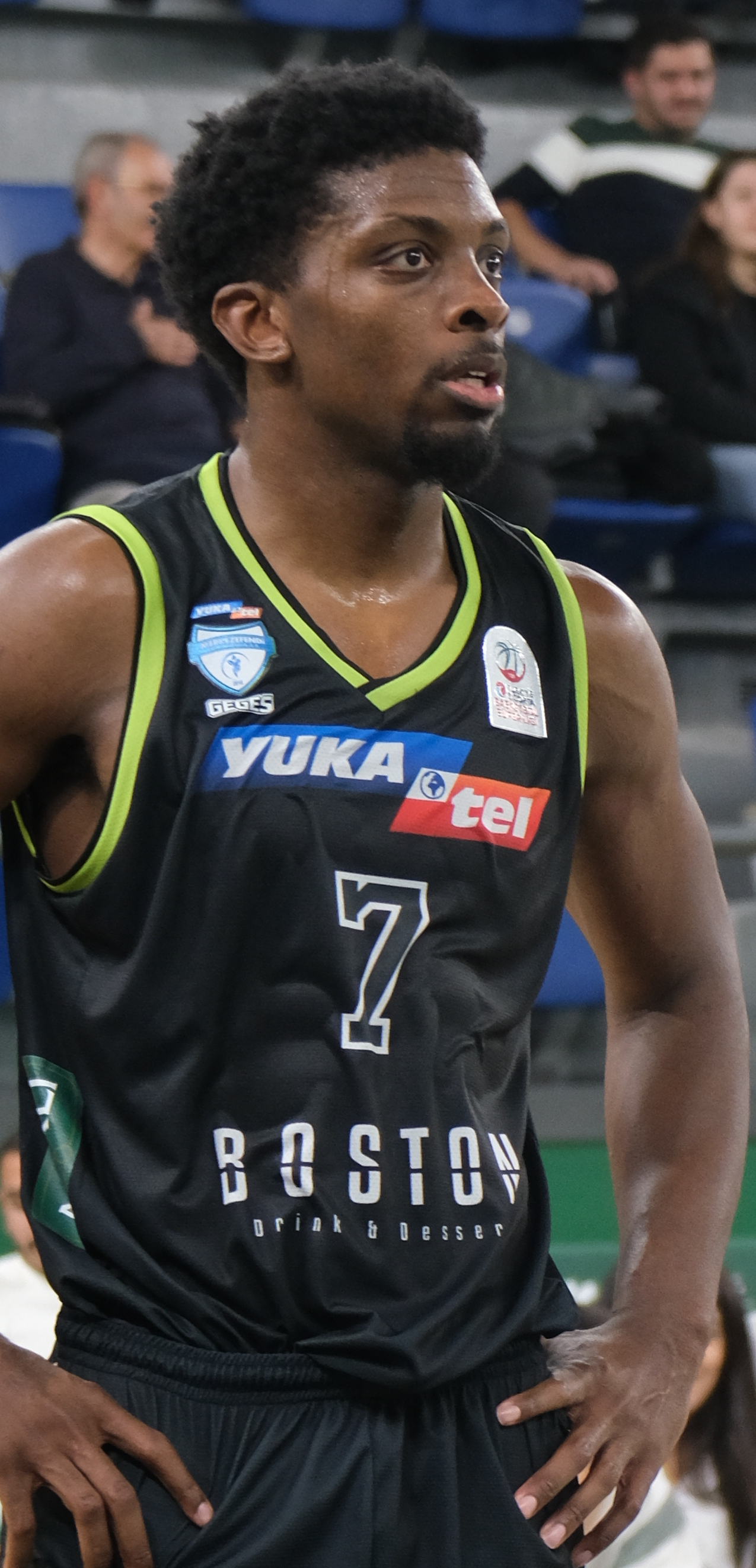
- Cook with Merkezefendi Belediye in 2024

Free agent
- Position: Power forward

Personal information
- Born: September 23, 1997 (age 29) St. Louis, Missouri, U.S.
- Listed height: 6 ft 8 in (2.03 m)
- Listed weight: 245 lb (111 kg)

Career information
- High school: Chaminade (Creve Coeur, Missouri)
- College: Iowa (2016–2019)
- NBA draft: 2019: undrafted
- Playing career: 2019–present

Career history
- 2019–2020: Cleveland Cavaliers
- 2019–2020: →Canton Charge
- 2020: Canton Charge
- 2020: Oklahoma City Blue
- 2020: Denver Nuggets
- 2021: Iowa Wolves
- 2021: Brooklyn Nets
- 2021: Detroit Pistons
- 2021–2022: Chicago Bulls
- 2021–2022: →Windy City Bulls
- 2022–2023: Salt Lake City Stars
- 2023: South East Melbourne Phoenix
- 2023–2024: Joventut Badalona
- 2024–2025: Merkezefendi Belediyesi Denizli
- 2025–2026: Ibaraki Robots
- 2026: Osos de Manatí
- 2026: Jilin Northeast Tigers

Career highlights
- NBA G League Next Up Game (2023); All-NBA G League Third Team (2021); Second-team All-Big Ten – Media (2019)
- Stats at NBA.com
- Stats at Basketball Reference

Tyler Calvin Cook (born September 23, 1997) is an American professional basketball player for the Jilin Northeast Tigers of the Chinese Basketball Association (CBA). He played college basketball for the Iowa Hawkeyes.

== Early life ==
Cook has an older brother. Cook played for Chaminade College Preparatory School alongside Jayson Tatum. As a senior, the duo led the team to a state title, where Cook scored 17 points in the championship game. In 2015, Cook announced his intentions to attend the University of Iowa.

== College career ==
He entered the starting lineup straight away during his freshman season but fractured his right index finger in November and missed seven games. He averaged 12.3 points and 5.3 rebounds per game on a team that reached the NIT. During his sophomore season he averaged 15.3 points and 6.8 rebounds per game. In March 2018, Cook submitted paperwork for early entry into the 2018 NBA draft, but did not hire an agent.

Cook scored 26 points as the Hawkeyes defeated Connecticut to win the 2K Classic tournament. He had another 26 as Iowa beat their rivals Iowa State. Cook missed a game against Northwestern on January 9, 2019, with a knee injury, though the team won without him. As a junior, Cook led Iowa to the NCAA tournament and averaged 14.5 points and 7.6 rebounds per game. Cook declared for the NBA draft and hired an agent.

== Professional career ==
=== Cleveland Cavaliers (2019–2020) ===
After going undrafted in the 2019 NBA draft, Cook signed a partially guaranteed contract with the Denver Nuggets. On August 13, 2019, Cook signed a two-way contract with the Nuggets. However, he was later released on October 16, 2019, during training camp. Cook was later claimed off waivers by the Cleveland Cavaliers on October 19. On January 3, 2020, the Cavaliers announced that they had converted the two-way contract with Cook to a standard NBA contract. On January 6, the Cavaliers announced that they had waived Cook. On January 9, Cook was re-signed by the Cavaliers, and immediately assigned to the Canton Charge. On January 20, the Cavaliers announced that they had signed a second 10-day contract with Cook.

=== Canton Charge (2020) ===
Cook's contract was not renewed when the second 10-day deal expired. He rejoined the Charge.

=== Oklahoma City Blue (2020) ===
On February 16, 2020, the Oklahoma City Blue announced that they had acquired Cook with a first-round draft pick and a second-round draft pick in 2020 NBA G League draft from the Canton Charge in exchange of Vincent Edwards and two 2020 first-round draft picks. On February 26, Cook registered 19 points, two rebounds, one assist, one steal and one block in a 128–115 win over the Northern Arizona Suns.

=== Denver Nuggets (2020) ===
On June 30, 2020, the Denver Nuggets announced that they had signed Cook to a two-way contract.

=== Iowa Wolves (2021) ===
On November 30, 2020, the Minnesota Timberwolves announced that they had signed Cook, but on December 19, 2020, the Timberwolves waived Cook. On January 8, 2021, the Iowa Wolves announced that they had acquired the returning right to Cook and the 17th overall pick in the first 2021 NBA G League draft from the Oklahoma City Blue for the returning right to James Webb III and the 7th overall pick in the 2021 draft.

=== Brooklyn Nets (2021) ===
On February 24, 2021, Cook was signed to a 10-day contract by the Brooklyn Nets.

=== Detroit Pistons (2021) ===
On March 19, 2021, Cook was signed to a 10-day contract by the Detroit Pistons, and on March 29, he signed a second 10-day contract. Finally, on April 7, he signed a multi-year contract.

On July 31, 2021, Cook was waived by the Pistons.

=== Chicago Bulls (2021–2022) ===
On September 8, 2021, Cook signed with the Chicago Bulls and on October 18, they converted his deal into a two-way contract with the Windy City Bulls of the NBA G League.

=== Salt Lake City Stars (2022–2023) ===
On October 23, 2022, Cook joined the Salt Lake City Stars training camp roster.

=== South East Melbourne Phoenix (2023) ===
On September 11, 2023, Cook signed with the South East Melbourne Phoenix of the Australian National Basketball League (NBL) as an injury replacement for Alan Williams. He was named the most valuable player of the NBL pre-season tournament. He suffered an eye injury in his third game and subsequently missed the next two. Upon Williams' return from injury on October 18, Cook was released by the Phoenix.

=== Joventut Badalona (2023–2024) ===
On November 16, 2023, he signed with Joventut Badalona of the Spanish Liga ACB.

=== Merkezefendi Belediyesi (2024–2025) ===
On September 26, 2024, Cook signed with Merkezefendi Belediyesi Denizli of the Basketbol Süper Ligi (BSL).

=== Ibaraki Robots (2025–present) ===
On June 17, 2025, Cook signed with the Ibaraki Robots of the Japanese B.League.

== Career statistics ==
Legend
GP	Games played	GS	Games started	MPG	Minutes per game
FG%	Field goal percentage	3P%	3-point field goal percentage	FT%	Free throw percentage
RPG	Rebounds per game	APG	Assists per game	SPG	Steals per game
BPG	Blocks per game	PPG	Points per game	**Bold**	Career high

=== NBA ===
==== Regular season ====
Year	Team	GP	GS	MPG	FG%	3P%	FT%	RPG	APG	SPG	BPG	PPG
2019–20	Cleveland	11	0	3.2	**.700**	—	.833	.9	.1	.1	.0	1.7
2019–20	Denver	2	0	9.5	.500	—	**1.000**	2.0	.0	**1.0**	.0	2.0
2020–21	Brooklyn	4	0	4.3	.333	—	—	.5	**.5**	.0	.0	.5
2020–21	Detroit	**28**	1	**15.0**	.680	**.500**	.486	**3.3**	**.5**	.3	.1	**5.5**
2021–22	Chicago	20	**2**	10.0	.605	—	.656	2.7	.2	.2	**.2**	3.4
Career		65	3	10.6	.654	.500	.600	2.5	.3	.2	.1	3.8

==== Playoffs ====
Year	Team	GP	GS	MPG	FG%	3P%	FT%	RPG	APG	SPG	BPG	PPG
2020	Denver	1	0	4.0	—	—	—	2.0	.0	.0	.0	.0
Career		1	0	4.0	—	—	—	2.0	.0	.0	.0	.0

=== College ===
Year	Team	GP	GS	MPG	FG%	3P%	FT%	RPG	APG	SPG	BPG	PPG
2016–17	Iowa	27	26	24.5	.554	**.250**	.598	5.3	1.0	**.7**	.4	12.3
2017–18	Iowa	**33**	**33**	28.0	**.566**	.143	**.661**	6.8	1.8	.6	**.6**	**15.3**
2018–19	Iowa	**33**	**33**	**30.8**	.510	.000	.644	**7.6**	**2.4**	**.7**	.5	14.5
Career		93	92	28.0	.542	.143	.639	6.7	1.8	.7	.5	14.1
