= 2019–20 Los Angeles Clippers season =

NBA Sports team season

- Head coach: Doc Rivers
- General manager: Michael Winger
- Owners: Steve Ballmer
- Arena: Staples Center

Results
- Record: 49–23 (.681)
- Place: Division: 2nd (Pacific); Conference: 2nd (Western)
- Playoff finish: Conference semifinals (lost to Nuggets 3–4)
- Stats at Basketball Reference

Local media
- Television: KCOP-TV; Fox Sports West and Prime Ticket
- Radio: KLAC

The 2019–20 Los Angeles Clippers season was the 50th season of the franchise in the National Basketball Association (NBA), their 42nd season in Southern California, and their 36th season in Los Angeles.

On July 5, 2019, 2-time NBA champion, Finals MVP, and Defensive Player of the Year Kawhi Leonard agreed to join the Clippers, on the condition that the team trade for 6-time NBA All-Star Paul George from the Oklahoma City Thunder. Also during the offseason, they re-signed two-time NBA All-Defensive Team selection Patrick Beverley and three-time Sixth Man of the Year award winner Lou Williams. Entering the season, many analysts expected the Clippers to contend for an NBA championship.

Despite a nagging shoulder injury and "load management" policy that caused stars Paul George and Kawhi Leonard, respectively, to sit out multiple games, the Clippers were consistently at the top of the Western Conference standings. The Clippers improved on their 48–34 record last year after making the 8th seed in the Western Conference standings, finishing with a record of 49–23 (the equivalent of 56–26 in a full season) as the 2nd seed in the Western Conference, their highest seeded placement in franchise history. Kawhi Leonard was named a starter for the 2020 NBA All-Star Game by fans, current players, and media, and was later named the game's MVP. Montrezl Harrell won the 2019-20 NBA Sixth Man of the Year Award, joining Jamal Crawford and teammate Lou Williams as one of three players to win the award as members of the Clippers.

The season was suspended by the league officials following the games of March 11 after it was reported that Rudy Gobert tested positive for COVID-19. On July 5, the NBA announced a return of the season which would involve 22 teams playing in the NBA Bubble at the ESPN Wide World of Sports Complex at the Walt Disney World Resort in Florida. Each of the remaining 22 teams played eight seeding games to determine positioning for the NBA playoffs. Play resumed on July 30.

The Clippers had a 5–3 record for their bubble seeding games to earn the 2nd seed in the Western Conference and then faced off against the Dallas Mavericks in the first round of the playoffs. It was the first ever meeting between the two teams in the playoffs. The Clippers defeated the Mavericks in six games to win their first playoff series since 2015, advancing to the semifinals. In Game 5 of the series, the Clippers set a franchise record for scoring 154 points in the NBA Playoffs. The 154-point mark was the third most of any team in NBA playoff history. In the conference semifinals against the 3rd-seeded Denver Nuggets, the Clippers took a 3–1 series lead before ultimately losing in 7 games. The Clippers failed to hold double-digit leads in all three potential closeout games. Their elimination extends their drought of failing to reach the conference finals to 50 years, the longest amongst the four major professional sports leagues.

Following the Clippers' elimination from the playoffs, the team was roundly mocked on social media for their failure to win the championship. The 2019–20 Clippers team has since been viewed as having one of the greatest postseason collapses in NBA history.

The ensuing fallout from the Nuggets series caused Rivers to lose his position as head coach on September 28.

== Draft ==
Round	Pick	Player	Position	Nationality	College
2	48	Terance Mann	SF	United States	Florida State
2	56	Jaylen Hands	PG	United States	UCLA

The Clippers hold no first-round picks but holds two second-round picks. They had traded their 2019 first-round pick to the Memphis Grizzlies in 2016, before being ultimately held by the Boston Celtics entering the draft night. The 56th pick originally belonged to the Portland Trail Blazers and acquired by the Clippers from the Detroit Pistons as part of the Blake Griffin trade. The pick was eventually used to draft Jaylen Hands, whose rights were traded to the Brooklyn Nets along with a 2020 second-round draft pick for Mfiondu Kabengele.

== Roster ==
2019–20 Los Angeles Clippers roster
Players

Pos.	No.	Player	Height	Weight	DOB	From
G	21	Patrick Beverley	6 ft 1 in (1.85 m)	180 lb (82 kg)	1988–07–12	Arkansas
G/F	7	Amir Coffey (TW)	6 ft 8 in (2.03 m)	210 lb (95 kg)	1997–06–17	Minnesota
G	13	Paul George	6 ft 8 in (2.03 m)	220 lb (100 kg)	1990–05–02	Fresno State
F	4	JaMychal Green	6 ft 9 in (2.06 m)	227 lb (103 kg)	1990–06–21	Alabama
F	5	Montrezl Harrell	6 ft 8 in (2.03 m)	240 lb (109 kg)	1994–01–26	Louisville
G	1	Reggie Jackson	6 ft 3 in (1.91 m)	208 lb (94 kg)	1990–04–16	Boston College
C	25	Mfiondu Kabengele	6 ft 10 in (2.08 m)	250 lb (113 kg)	1997–08–14	Florida State
F	2	Kawhi Leonard	6 ft 7 in (2.01 m)	230 lb (104 kg)	1991–06–29	San Diego State
G/F	14	Terance Mann	6 ft 5 in (1.96 m)	215 lb (98 kg)	1996–10–18	Florida State
G	19	Rodney McGruder	6 ft 4 in (1.93 m)	205 lb (93 kg)	1991–07–29	Kansas State
F	31	Marcus Morris	6 ft 10 in (2.08 m)	235 lb (107 kg)	1989–09–02	Kansas
F	15	Johnathan Motley (TW)	6 ft 10 in (2.08 m)	230 lb (104 kg)	1995–05–04	Baylor
C	55	Joakim Noah	6 ft 11 in (2.11 m)	232 lb (105 kg)	1985–02–25	Florida
F	54	Patrick Patterson	6 ft 9 in (2.06 m)	235 lb (107 kg)	1989–03–14	Kentucky
G	20	Landry Shamet	6 ft 4 in (1.93 m)	190 lb (86 kg)	1997–03–13	Wichita State
G	23	Lou Williams	6 ft 1 in (1.85 m)	175 lb (79 kg)	1986–10–27	South Gwinnett HS (GA)
C	40	Ivica Zubac	7 ft 1 in (2.16 m)	240 lb (109 kg)	1997–03–18	Croatia

Coaches
Head coach
- Doc Rivers
Assistant(s)
- Jeremy Castleberry
- Sam Cassell
- Armond Hill
- Casey Hill
- Rex Kalamian
- Tyronn Lue
- Brendan O'Connor
- John Welch

Legend
- (DP) Unsigned draft pick
- (FA) Free agent
- (S) Suspended
- (GL) On assignment to G League affiliate
- (TW) Two-way affiliate player
- Injured

Roster
Updated: 2020–03–09

== Standings ==
=== Division ===
Pacific Division	W	L	PCT	GB	Home	Road	Div	GP
c – Los Angeles Lakers	52	19	.732	–	25‍–‍10	27‍–‍9	10–3	71
x – Los Angeles Clippers	49	23	.681	3.5	27‍–‍9	22‍–‍14	8–6	72
Phoenix Suns	34	39	.466	19.0	17‍–‍22	17‍–‍17	6–9	73
Sacramento Kings	31	41	.431	21.5	16‍–‍19	15‍–‍22	8–5	72
Golden State Warriors	15	50	.231	34.0	8‍–‍26	7‍–‍24	2–11	65

=== Conference ===
Western Conference
#	Team	W	L	PCT	GB	GP
1	c – Los Angeles Lakers *	52	19	.732	–	71
2	x – Los Angeles Clippers	49	23	.681	3.5	72
3	y – Denver Nuggets *	46	27	.630	7.0	73
4	y – Houston Rockets *	44	28	.611	8.5	72
5	x – Oklahoma City Thunder	44	28	.611	8.5	72
6	x – Utah Jazz	44	28	.611	8.5	72
7	x – Dallas Mavericks	43	32	.573	11.0	75
8	x – Portland Trail Blazers	35	39	.473	18.5	74
9	pi – Memphis Grizzlies	34	39	.466	19.0	73
10	Phoenix Suns	34	39	.466	19.0	73
11	San Antonio Spurs	32	39	.451	20.0	71
12	Sacramento Kings	31	41	.431	21.5	72
13	New Orleans Pelicans	30	42	.417	22.5	72
14	Minnesota Timberwolves	19	45	.297	29.5	64
15	Golden State Warriors	15	50	.231	34.0	65

== Game log ==
=== Regular season ===
2019–20 game log
Total: 49–23 (home: 27–9; road: 22–14)
October: 4–2 (home: 3–0; road: 1–2)

Game	Date	Team	Score	High points	High rebounds	High assists	Location Attendance	Record
1	October 22	L. A. Lakers	W 112–102	Kawhi Leonard (30)	Patrick Beverley (10)	Lou Williams (7)	Staples Center; 19,068	1–0
2	October 24	@ Golden State	W 141–122	Lou Williams (22)	Ivica Zubac (10)	Kawhi Leonard (9)	Chase Center; 18,064	2–0
3	October 26	@ Phoenix	L 122–130	Kawhi Leonard (27)	Kawhi Leonard (10)	Kawhi Leonard (8)	Talking Stick Resort Arena; 15,802	2–1
4	October 28	Charlotte	W 111–96	Kawhi Leonard (30)	Leonard, Harrell (7)	Kawhi Leonard (6)	Staples Center; 19,068	3–1
5	October 30	@ Utah	L 96–110	Lou Williams (24)	Zubac, Green (8)	Terance Mann (5)	Vivint Smart Home Arena; 18,306	3–2
6	October 31	San Antonio	W 103–97	Kawhi Leonard (38)	Kawhi Leonard (12)	L.Williams, Beverley (5)	Staples Center; 19,068	4–2

November: 10–4 (home: 8–1; road: 2–3)

Game	Date	Team	Score	High points	High rebounds	High assists	Location Attendance	Record
7	November 3	Utah	W 105–94	Kawhi Leonard (30)	Zubac, Beverley (9)	Leonard, L.Williams, Beverley (3)	Staples Center; 19,068	5–2
8	November 6	Milwaukee	L 124–129	Harrell, L.Williams (34)	Montrezl Harrell (13)	Lou Williams (11)	Staples Center; 19,068	5–3
9	November 7	Portland	W 107–101	Kawhi Leonard (27)	Leonard, Zubac (13)	Lou Williams (8)	Staples Center; 19,068	6–3
10	November 11	Toronto	W 98–88	Lou Williams (21)	Green, Beverley (12)	Kawhi Leonard (9)	Staples Center; 19,068	7–3
11	November 13	@ Houston	L 93–102	Kawhi Leonard (26)	JaMychal Green (14)	Kawhi Leonard (7)	Toyota Center; 18,055	7–4
12	November 14	@ New Orleans	L 127–132	Paul George (33)	Paul George (9)	Lou Williams (9)	Smoothie King Center; 17,147	7–5
13	November 16	Atlanta	W 150–101	Paul George (37)	Green, Zubac (9)	Terance Mann (8)	Staples Center; 19,068	8–5
14	November 18	Oklahoma City	W 90–88	Montrezl Harrell (28)	Montrezl Harrell (12)	Lou Williams (9)	Staples Center; 19,068	9–5
15	November 20	Boston	W 107–104 (OT)	Lou Williams (27)	Patrick Beverley (16)	Paul George (8)	Staples Center; 19,068	10–5
16	November 22	Houston	W 122–119	Lou Williams (26)	JaMychal Green (9)	Lou Williams (8)	Staples Center; 19,068	11–5
17	November 24	New Orleans	W 134–109	Montrezl Harrell (34)	Montrezl Harrell (12)	Kawhi Leonard (6)	Staples Center; 19,068	12–5
18	November 26	@ Dallas	W 114–99	Kawhi Leonard (28)	Leonard, Green (8)	Lou Williams (6)	American Airlines Center; 20,407	13–5
19	November 27	@ Memphis	W 121–119	Harrell, L.Williams (24)	Montrezl Harrell (10)	Lou Williams (13)	FedExForum; 16,721	14–5
20	November 29	@ San Antonio	L 97–107	Kawhi Leonard (19)	George, Green (8)	Leonard, L.Williams (7)	AT&T Center; 18,354	14–6

December: 10–5 (home: 3–2; road: 7–3)

Game	Date	Team	Score	High points	High rebounds	High assists	Location Attendance	Record
21	December 1	Washington	W 150–125	Kawhi Leonard (34)	Montrezl Harrell (15)	Lou Williams (8)	Staples Center; 19,068	15–6
22	December 3	Portland	W 117–97	Montrezl Harrell (26)	Leonard, Harrell (9)	Lou Williams (7)	Staples Center; 19,068	16–6
23	December 6	@ Milwaukee	L 91–119	Kawhi Leonard (17)	Ivica Zubac (12)	Kawhi Leonard (4)	Fiserv Forum; 17,732	16–7
24	December 8	@ Washington	W 135–119	Kawhi Leonard (34)	Kawhi Leonard (11)	George, L.Williams (6)	Capital One Arena; 15,946	17–7
25	December 9	@ Indiana	W 110–99	Paul George (36)	Maurice Harkless (14)	Lou Williams (6)	Bankers Life Fieldhouse; 14,644	18–7
26	December 11	@ Toronto	W 112–92	Kawhi Leonard (23)	Ivica Zubac (8)	Lou Williams (8)	Scotiabank Arena; 20,144	19–7
27	December 13	@ Minnesota	W 124–117	Paul George (46)	Kawhi Leonard (11)	Paul George (7)	Target Center; 17,585	20–7
28	December 14	@ Chicago	L 106–109	Montrezl Harrell (30)	Montrezl Harrell (7)	Paul George (6)	United Center; 18,426	20–8
29	December 17	Phoenix	W 120–99	Paul George (24)	Rodney McGruder (11)	Lou Williams (8)	Staples Center; 19,068	21–8
30	December 19	Houston	L 117–122	Paul George (34)	George, Leonard (9)	Patrick Beverley (7)	Staples Center; 19,068	21–9
31	December 21	@ San Antonio	W 134–109	Kawhi Leonard (26)	Montrezl Harrell (8)	Kawhi Leonard (9)	AT&T Center; 18,354	22–9
32	December 22	@ Oklahoma City	L 112–118	Lou Williams (22)	Harrell, Zubac (8)	Lou Williams (7)	Chesapeake Energy Arena; 18,203	22–10
33	December 25	@ L. A. Lakers	W 111–106	Kawhi Leonard (35)	Kawhi Leonard (12)	Lou Williams (7)	Staples Center; 18,997	23–10
34	December 28	Utah	L 107–120	Paul George (20)	Ivica Zubac (12)	Lou Williams (9)	Staples Center; 19,068	23–11
35	December 31	@ Sacramento	W 105–87	Kawhi Leonard (24)	Ivica Zubac (13)	Paul George (9)	Golden 1 Center; 16,231	24–11

January: 9–4 (home: 5–2; road: 4–2)

Game	Date	Team	Score	High points	High rebounds	High assists	Location Attendance	Record
36	January 2	Detroit	W 126–112	Montrezl Harrell (23)	JaMychal Green (11)	Shamet, Leonard, L.Williams (5)	Staples Center; 19,068	25–11
37	January 4	Memphis	L 114–140	Montrezl Harrell (28)	Ivica Zubac (11)	Lou Williams (7)	Staples Center; 19,068	25–12
38	January 5	New York	W 135–132	Montrezl Harrell (34)	JaMychal Green (10)	Lou Williams (9)	Staples Center; 19,068	26–12
39	January 10	Golden State	W 109–100	Kawhi Leonard (36)	Patrick Beverley (11)	Patrick Beverley (9)	Staples Center; 19,068	27–12
40	January 12	@ Denver	L 104–114	Kawhi Leonard (30)	Ivica Zubac (9)	Patrick Beverley (7)	Pepsi Center; 19,520	27–13
41	January 14	Cleveland	W 128–103	Kawhi Leonard (43)	Maurice Harkless (11)	Patrick Beverley (9)	Staples Center; 19,068	28–13
42	January 16	Orlando	W 122–95	Kawhi Leonard (32)	JaMychal Green (13)	Patrick Beverley (7)	Staples Center; 19,068	29–13
43	January 18	@ New Orleans	W 133–130	Kawhi Leonard (39)	Leonard, Beverley (6)	Leonard, Beverley (6)	Smoothie King Center; 17,959	30–13
44	January 21	@ Dallas	W 110–107	Kawhi Leonard (36)	Kawhi Leonard (11)	L.Williams, Beverley (4)	American Airlines Center; 19,783	31–13
45	January 22	@ Atlanta	L 95–102	Montrezl Harrell (30)	Montrezl Harrell (7)	Lou Williams (7)	State Farm Arena; 14,338	31–14
46	January 24	@ Miami	W 122–117	Kawhi Leonard (33)	Montrezl Harrell (11)	Kawhi Leonard (10)	American Airlines Arena; 19,632	32–14
47	January 26	@ Orlando	W 112–97	Kawhi Leonard (31)	Kawhi Leonard (14)	Kawhi Leonard (7)	Amway Center; 15,427	33–14
—	January 28	@ LA Lakers	Postponed due to the Death of Kobe Bryant. Makeup date July 30 (Originally April 9).					
48	January 30	Sacramento	L 103–124	Lou Williams (22)	Ivica Zubac (10)	Lou Williams (6)	Staples Center; 19,068	33–15

February: 7–4 (home: 5–1; road: 2–3)

Game	Date	Team	Score	High points	High rebounds	High assists	Location Attendance	Record
49	February 1	Minnesota	W 118–106	Kawhi Leonard (31)	Ivica Zubac (10)	Lou Williams (6)	Staples Center; 19,068	34–15
50	February 3	San Antonio	W 108–105	Kawhi Leonard (22)	Paul George (12)	Paul George (8)	Staples Center; 19,068	35–15
51	February 5	Miami	W 128–111	George, Shamet (23)	Ivica Zubac (8)	Paul George (10)	Staples Center; 19,068	36–15
52	February 8	@ Minnesota	L 115–142	Kawhi Leonard (29)	Ivica Zubac (8)	Mann, L.Williams (5)	Target Center; 18,978	36–16
53	February 9	@ Cleveland	W 133–92	Lou Williams (25)	Montrezl Harrell (9)	George, McGruder, Zubac (4)	Rocket Mortgage FieldHouse; 17,240	37–16
54	February 11	@ Philadelphia	L 103–110	Kawhi Leonard (30)	Paul George (12)	Kawhi Leonard (9)	Wells Fargo Center; 20,730	37–17
55	February 13	@ Boston	L 133–141 (2OT)	Lou Williams (35)	Montrezl Harrell (13)	Lou Williams (8)	TD Garden; 19,156	37–18
56	February 22	Sacramento	L 103–112	Kawhi Leonard (31)	Ivica Zubac (15)	Kawhi Leonard (5)	Staples Center; 19,068	37–19
57	February 24	Memphis	W 124–97	Kawhi Leonard (25)	Ivica Zubac (10)	Jackson, L.Williams (6)	Staples Center; 19,068	38–19
58	February 26	@ Phoenix	W 102–92	Kawhi Leonard (24)	Kawhi Leonard (14)	Kawhi Leonard (5)	Talking Stick Resort Arena; 15,157	39–19
59	February 28	Denver	W 132–103	Paul George (24)	Montrezl Harrell (10)	Jackson, L.Williams (7)	Staples Center; 19,068	40–19

March: 4–1 (home: 1–1; road: 3–0)

Game	Date	Team	Score	High points	High rebounds	High assists	Location Attendance	Record
60	March 1	Philadelphia	W 136–130	Kawhi Leonard (30)	Montrezl Harrell (9)	Lou Williams (8)	Staples Center; 19,068	41–19
61	March 3	@ Oklahoma City	W 109–94	Kawhi Leonard (25)	Kawhi Leonard (8)	Lou Williams (4)	Chesapeake Energy Arena; 18,203	42–19
62	March 5	@ Houston	W 120–105	Kawhi Leonard (25)	Ivica Zubac (12)	Paul George (7)	Toyota Center; 18,055	43–19
63	March 8	L. A. Lakers	L 103–112	Paul George (31)	Montrezl Harrell (8)	George, Williams (3)	Staples Center; 19,068	43–20
64	March 10	@ Golden State	W 131–107	Kawhi Leonard (23)	Ivica Zubac (12)	Leonard, George, Shamet (5)	Chase Center; 18,064	44–20

Seeding games: 5–3 (home: 2–2; road: 3–1)

Game	Date	Team	Score	High points	High rebounds	High assists	Location Attendance	Record
65	July 30	@ L. A. Lakers	L 101–103	Paul George (30)	Reggie Jackson (6)	Jackson, Leonard (4)	The Arena; No In-Person Attendance	44–21
66	August 1	New Orleans	W 126–103	Paul George (28)	Ivica Zubac (9)	Kawhi Leonard (5)	HP Field House; No In-Person Attendance	45–21
67	August 4	Phoenix	L 115–117	Kawhi Leonard (27)	Ivica Zubac (12)	Lou Williams (6)	The Arena; No In-Person Attendance	45–22
68	August 6	@ Dallas	W 126–111	Kawhi Leonard (29)	Ivica Zubac (15)	Paul George (6)	HP Field House; No In-Person Attendance	46–22
69	August 8	@ Portland	W 122–117	Paul George (21)	Ivica Zubac (12)	Reggie Jackson (5)	HP Field House; No In-Person Attendance	47–22
70	August 9	Brooklyn	L 120–129	Kawhi Leonard (39)	Ivica Zubac (15)	Kawhi Leonard (6)	The Arena; No In-Person Attendance	47–23
71	August 12	@ Denver	W 124–111	Paul George (27)	Ivica Zubac (12)	Lou Williams (7)	The Arena; No In-Person Attendance	48–23
72	August 14	Oklahoma City	W 107–103 (OT)	Terance Mann (25)	Mann, Patterson (14)	Terance Mann (9)	HP Field House; No In-Person Attendance	49–23

Cancelled games

Game	Date	Team	Score	High points	High rebounds	High assists	Location Attendance	Record
65	March 13	Brooklyn					Staples Center	
66	March 14	New Orleans					Staples Center	
67	March 16	Dallas					Staples Center	
68	March 18	@ Denver					Pepsi Center	
69	March 20	Phoenix					Staples Center	
70	March 23	@ New York					Madison Square Garden	
71	March 25	@ Brooklyn					Barclays Center	
72	March 27	@ Detroit					Little Caesars Arena	
73	March 28	@ Charlotte					Spectrum Center	
74	March 30	Indiana					Staples Center	
75	April 2	@ Sacramento					Golden 1 Center	
76	April 4	Oklahoma City					Staples Center	
77	April 6	Chicago					Staples Center	
78	April 7	@ Utah					Vivint Smart Home Arena	
79	April 9	@ LA Lakers					Staples Center	
80	April 11	Golden State					Staples Center	
81	April 13	Minnesota					Staples Center	
82	April 15	@ Portland					Moda Center	

2019–20 season schedule

=== Playoffs ===
2020 playoff game log
Total: 7–6 (home: 3–4; road: 4–2)
First round: 4–2 (home: 2–1; road: 2–1)

Game	Date	Team	Score	High points	High rebounds	High assists	Location Attendance	Series
1	August 17	Dallas	W 118–110	Kawhi Leonard (29)	Kawhi Leonard (12)	Kawhi Leonard (6)	The Arena; No In-Person Attendance	1–0
2	August 19	Dallas	L 114–127	Kawhi Leonard (35)	Leonard, George (10)	Lou Williams (7)	The Arena; No In-Person Attendance	1–1
3	August 21	@ Dallas	W 130–122	Kawhi Leonard (36)	Leonard, George (9)	Kawhi Leonard (8)	The Arena; No In-Person Attendance	2–1
4	August 23	@ Dallas	L 133–135 (OT)	Lou Williams (36)	Kawhi Leonard (9)	Lou Williams (5)	The Arena; No In-Person Attendance	2–2
5	August 25	Dallas	W 154–111	Paul George (35)	Montrezl Harrell (11)	Reggie Jackson (5)	The Arena; No In-Person Attendance	3–2
6	August 30	@ Dallas	W 111–97	Kawhi Leonard (33)	Kawhi Leonard (14)	George, Leonard (7)	The Arena; No In-Person Attendance	4–2

Conference semifinals: 3–4 (home: 1–3; road: 2–1)

Game	Date	Team	Score	High points	High rebounds	High assists	Location Attendance	Series
1	September 3	Denver	W 120–97	Kawhi Leonard (29)	George, Green, Zubac (7)	George, Williams (4)	AdventHealth Arena; No in-person attendance	1–0
2	September 5	Denver	L 101–110	Paul George (22)	JaMychal Green (11)	Kawhi Leonard (8)	AdventHealth Arena; No in-person attendance	1–1
3	September 7	@ Denver	W 113–107	Paul George (32)	Kawhi Leonard (14)	Kawhi Leonard (6)	AdventHealth Arena; No in-person attendance	2–1
4	September 9	@ Denver	W 96–85	Kawhi Leonard (30)	Kawhi Leonard (11)	Kawhi Leonard (9)	AdventHealth Arena; No in-person attendance	3–1
5	September 11	Denver	L 105–111	Kawhi Leonard (36)	Leonard, Zubac (9)	Paul George (6)	HP Field House; No in-person attendance	3–2
6	September 13	@ Denver	L 98–111	Paul George (33)	Ivica Zubac (12)	Kawhi Leonard (5)	AdventHealth Arena; No in-person attendance	3–3
7	September 15	Denver	L 89–104	Montrezl Harrell (20)	Green, Leonard, Morris (6)	Beverley, Leonard, Williams (6)	AdventHealth Arena; No in-person attendance	3–4

2020 playoff schedule

== Player statistics ==
Legend
GP	Games played	GS	Games started	MPG	Minutes per game
FG%	Field-goal percentage	3P%	3-point field-goal percentage	FT%	Free-throw percentage
RPG	Rebounds per game	APG	Assists per game	SPG	Steals per game
BPG	Blocks per game	PPG	Points per game

=== Regular season ===
Player	GP	GS	MPG	FG%	3P%	FT%	RPG	APG	SPG	BPG	PPG
Ivica Zubac	72	70	18.4	.613	.000	.747	7.5	1.1	.2	.9	8.3
Lou Williams	65	8	28.7	.418	.352	.861	3.1	5.6	.7	.2	18.2
Montrezl Harrell	63	2	27.8	.580	.000	.658	7.1	1.7	.6	1.1	18.6
JaMychal Green	63	1	20.7	.429	.387	.750	6.2	.8	.5	.4	6.8
Patrick Patterson	59	18	13.2	.408	.390	.814	2.6	.7	.1	.1	4.9
Kawhi Leonard	57	57	32.4	.470	.378	.886	7.1	4.9	1.8	.6	27.1
Rodney McGruder	56	4	15.6	.398	.270	.559	2.7	.6	.5	.1	3.3
Landry Shamet	53	30	27.4	.404	.375	.855	1.9	1.9	.4	.2	9.3
Patrick Beverley	51	50	26.3	.431	.388	.660	5.2	3.6	1.1	.5	7.9
Maurice Harkless^{†}	50	38	22.8	.516	.370	.571	4.0	1.0	1.0	.6	5.5
Paul George	48	48	29.6	.439	.412	.876	5.7	3.9	1.4	.4	21.5
Jerome Robinson^{†}	42	1	11.3	.338	.284	.579	1.4	1.1	.3	.2	2.9
Terance Mann	41	6	8.8	.468	.350	.667	1.3	1.3	.3	.1	2.4
Derrick Walton^{†}	23	1	9.7	.472	.429	.778	.7	1.0	.2	.0	2.2
Marcus Morris Sr.^{†}	19	19	28.9	.425	.310	.818	4.1	1.4	.7	.7	10.1
Amir Coffey	18	1	8.8	.426	.316	.545	.9	.8	.3	.1	3.2
Reggie Jackson^{†}	17	6	21.3	.453	.413	.905	3.0	3.2	.3	.2	9.5
Johnathan Motley	13	0	3.2	.733	1.000	.714	.8	.6	.2	.0	2.2
Mfiondu Kabengele	12	0	5.3	.438	.450	1.000	.9	.2	.2	.2	3.5
Joakim Noah	5	0	10.0	.500		.750	3.2	1.4	.2	.2	2.8

=== Playoffs ===
Player	GP	GS	MPG	FG%	3P%	FT%	RPG	APG	SPG	BPG	PPG
Kawhi Leonard	13	13	39.3	.489	.329	.862	9.3	5.5	2.3	.8	28.2
Paul George	13	13	36.8	.398	.333	.909	6.1	3.8	1.5	.5	20.2
Marcus Morris Sr.	13	13	29.8	.505	.475	.929	4.8	1.6	.8	.1	11.8
Ivica Zubac	13	13	24.6	.564		.811	7.2	.6	.2	.8	9.1
Landry Shamet	13	4	18.7	.407	.357	.714	1.7	1.3	.5	.2	5.2
Lou Williams	13	0	26.2	.425	.235	.811	3.2	4.2	.8	.2	12.8
Montrezl Harrell	13	0	18.7	.573	.200	.603	2.9	.4	.4	.5	10.5
JaMychal Green	13	0	17.1	.564	.435	.778	3.8	.5	.2	.2	6.1
Terance Mann	13	0	2.1	.400	.000		.5	.1	.1	.0	.3
Reggie Jackson	12	1	14.2	.438	.531		1.8	.9	.2	.1	4.9
Patrick Beverley	8	8	20.8	.513	.364	.500	4.1	2.4	1.0	.4	6.3
Rodney McGruder	5	0	3.2	.600	.667		.8	.4	.0	.0	1.6
Amir Coffey	3	0	2.3	.000	.000	1.000	.0	1.3	.3	.0	.7
Patrick Patterson	2	0	5.0	1.000	1.000		.5	2.0	.0	.0	4.5
Joakim Noah	2	0	1.0				.0	.0	.0	.0	.0

- ^{†} Denotes player spent time with another team in the season. Stats reflect time with the Clippers only.

== Transactions ==
=== Overview ===
Players Added

Draft

- Terance Mann

Trade

- Paul George
- Maurice Harkless

Free agency

- Kawhi Leonard
- Patrick Patterson

Two-way contract

- Amir Coffey
Players Lost

Trade

- Danilo Gallinari
- Shai Gilgeous-Alexander

Free agency

- Garrett Temple
- Wilson Chandler
- Ángel Delgado

Waived

- Tyrone Wallace
- Sindarius Thornwell

=== Trades ===
June 20, 2019	To Los Angeles Clippers Draft rights to Mfiondu Kabengele	To Brooklyn Nets Draft rights to Jaylen Hands; 2020 first-round pick
July 6, 2019	To Los Angeles Clippers Maurice Harkless (from Portland); Draft rights to Mathias Lessort (from Philadelphia); 2023 first-round pick (from Miami)	To Portland Trail Blazers Hassan Whiteside (from Miami)
July 6, 2019	To Philadelphia 76ers Josh Richardson (from Miami)	To Miami Heat Jimmy Butler (from Philadelphia); Meyers Leonard (from Portland); Cash considerations (from Los Angeles)
July 10, 2019	To Los Angeles Clippers Paul George	To Oklahoma City Thunder Danilo Gallinari; Shai Gilgeous-Alexander; 2021 first-round pick (from Miami); 2022 first-round pick 2023 first-round pick (from Miami); 2024 first-round pick 2026 first-round pick Right to swap first-round picks in 2023 and 2025
February 6, 2020	To Los Angeles Clippers Protected 2022 second-round pick	To Atlanta Hawks Derrick Walton, Jr. Cash considerations
February 6, 2020	To Los Angeles Clippers Marcus Morris (from New York); Isaiah Thomas (from Washington)	To New York Knicks Maurice Harkless (from LA Clippers); 2020 LAC first-round pick 2021 LAC first-round pick swap (Note: Top 4 protected.); 2021 DET second-round pick (from LA Clippers); Draft rights to Issuf Sanon (2018 #44) (from Washington)
February 6, 2020	To Washington Wizards Jerome Robinson (from LA Clippers)

=== Free agency ===
==== Re-signed ====
Player	Signed
Ivica Zubac	July 10, 2019
Rodney McGruder	July 10, 2019
Patrick Beverley	July 11, 2019
JaMychal Green	July 18, 2019
Johnathan Motley	July 25, 2019, Two-way contract

==== Additions ====
Player	Signed	Former team
Amir Coffey	July 9, 2019, Two-way contract	Minnesota Golden Gophers
Kawhi Leonard	July 10, 2019, 3-year contract worth $103 million	Toronto Raptors
Patrick Patterson	August 15, 2019	Oklahoma City Thunder
Derrick Walton, Jr.	October 21, 2019, Exhibit 10 contract	(Germany) Alba Berlin
Reggie Jackson	February 20, 2020	Detroit Pistons
Joakim Noah	March 9, 2020, 10-day contract June 28, 2020, signed for rest of the season	Memphis Grizzlies

==== Subtractions ====
Player	Reason left	New team
Tyrone Wallace	Waived, July 6, 2019	Minnesota Timberwolves
Sindarius Thornwell	Waived, July 6, 2019	Cleveland Cavaliers
Garrett Temple	Free agency, July 8, 2019	Brooklyn Nets
Wilson Chandler	Free agency, July 8, 2019	Brooklyn Nets
Angel Delgado	Free agency, August 8, 2019	(China) Beijing Royal Fighters
Isaiah Thomas	Waived, February 8, 2020	New Orleans Pelicans
