= 2019–20 Miami Heat season =

NBA professional basketball team season

- Conference champions
- Division champions
- Head coach: Erik Spoelstra
- President: Pat Riley
- General manager: Andy Elisburg
- Owner: Micky Arison
- Arena: American Airlines Arena

Results
- Record: 44–29 (.603)
- Place: Division: 1st (Southeast); Conference: 5th (Eastern)
- Playoff finish: NBA Finals (lost to Lakers 2–4)
- Stats at Basketball Reference

Local media
- Television: Fox Sports Sun
- Radio: 790 AM, "The Ticket"

The 2019–20 Miami Heat season was the 32nd season of the franchise in the National Basketball Association (NBA). It was the first time since 2016-17 that Dwyane Wade was not on the Miami Heat roster and the NBA's first time without Wade since 2002-03, as he retired from the NBA after playing 16 years in the league. It was the first season for Jimmy Butler on the Heat.

Jimmy Butler and Bam Adebayo were both selected into 2020 NBA All-Star Game.

The season was suspended by the league officials following the games of March 11 after it was reported that Rudy Gobert tested positive for COVID-19.

On June 4, the Heat were one of 22 teams invited to the NBA Bubble.

In the playoffs, the Heat made an unexpectedly deep playoff run by sweeping the Pacers in four straight games in the first round, then surpassing the Bucks who were led by 2020 MVP Giannis Antetokounmpo in five games. It was their first Conference Finals appearance in six years. In the Eastern Conference Finals, they faced off against the third-seeded Boston Celtics in the two teams' first playoff series since 2012 and defeated Boston in six games, winning the Eastern Conference for the 6th time and reaching the NBA Finals for the first time since 2014. They were defeated by the Los Angeles Lakers (who were led by former Heat star LeBron James) in six games.

== Draft picks ==
| Round | Pick | Player | Position | Nationality | School/club team |
|---|---|---|---|---|---|
| 1 | 13 | Tyler Herro | SG | (United States) American | Kentucky |
| 2 | 32 | KZ Okpala | SF | (United States) American | Stanford |
| 2 | 44 | Bol Bol | C | (United States) American | Oregon |

Before entering the 2019 NBA draft, the Miami Heat originally only held their lottery selection for the 2019 NBA Draft. On June 19, the night before the draft began, the Heat acquired the Atlanta Hawks' 44th pick of the draft in exchange for a conditional 2024 second-round pick and cash considerations. With their sole first-round pick of the draft, the Miami Heat selected shooting guard Tyler Herro from the University of Kentucky. On draft night, the Heat agreed to a trade with the Phoenix Suns that saw them obtain the draft rights to forward KZ Okpala from Stanford University. Finally, with the selection the Heat acquired from the Hawks the prior night, Miami selected Sudanese-American center Bol Bol from the University of Oregon. However, the Heat agreed to a trade that sent the draft rights to Bol Bol to the Denver Nuggets for a future conditional second-round pick and $1.88 million cash.

== Roster ==
2019–20 Miami Heat roster
Players

| Pos. | No. | Player | Height | Weight | DOB | From |
|---|---|---|---|---|---|---|
| C | 13 | Bam Adebayo | 6 ft 9 in (2.06 m) | 255 lb (116 kg) | 1997–07–18 | Kentucky |
| PF | 17 | Kyle Alexander (TW) | 6 ft 10 in (2.08 m) | 226 lb (103 kg) | 1996–10–21 | Tennessee |
| SG | 22 | Jimmy Butler | 6 ft 8 in (2.03 m) | 230 lb (104 kg) | 1989–09–14 | Marquette |
| SF | 99 | Jae Crowder | 6 ft 6 in (1.98 m) | 235 lb (107 kg) | 1990–07–06 | Marquette |
| PG | 7 | Goran Dragić | 6 ft 3 in (1.91 m) | 190 lb (86 kg) | 1986–05–06 | Slovenia |
| PF | 40 | Udonis Haslem | 6 ft 8 in (2.03 m) | 235 lb (107 kg) | 1980–06–09 | Florida |
| SG | 14 | Tyler Herro | 6 ft 5 in (1.96 m) | 195 lb (88 kg) | 2000–01–20 | Kentucky |
| SF | 44 | Solomon Hill | 6 ft 7 in (2.01 m) | 226 lb (103 kg) | 1991–03–18 | Arizona |
| SF | 28 | Andre Iguodala | 6 ft 6 in (1.98 m) | 215 lb (98 kg) | 1984–01–28 | Arizona |
| SF | 5 | Derrick Jones | 6 ft 7 in (2.01 m) | 210 lb (95 kg) | 1997–02–15 | UNLV |
| C | 0 | Meyers Leonard | 7 ft 0 in (2.13 m) | 260 lb (118 kg) | 1992–02–27 | Illinois |
| PG | 25 | Kendrick Nunn | 6 ft 2 in (1.88 m) | 190 lb (86 kg) | 1995–08–03 | Oakland |
| SF | 4 | KZ Okpala | 6 ft 9 in (2.06 m) | 215 lb (98 kg) | 1999–04–28 | Stanford |
| PF/C | 9 | Kelly Olynyk | 6 ft 11 in (2.11 m) | 240 lb (109 kg) | 1991–04–19 | Gonzaga |
| SG | 55 | Duncan Robinson | 6 ft 7 in (2.01 m) | 215 lb (98 kg) | 1994–04–22 | Michigan |
| PF | 30 | Chris Silva | 6 ft 10 in (2.08 m) | 234 lb (106 kg) | 1996–09–19 | South Carolina |
| SG | 2 | Gabe Vincent (TW) | 6 ft 3 in (1.91 m) | 200 lb (91 kg) | 1996–06–14 | UC Santa Barbara |

Coaches
Head coach
- Erik Spoelstra
Assistant(s)
- Malik Allen
- Dan Craig
- Octavio De La Grana
- Chris Quinn

Legend
- (DP) Unsigned draft pick
- (FA) Free agent
- (S) Suspended
- (GL) On assignment to G League affiliate
- (TW) Two-way affiliate player
- Injured

Roster
Updated: 2019–11–30

== Standings ==
=== Division ===
| Southeast Division | W | L | PCT | GB | Home | Road | Div | GP |
|---|---|---|---|---|---|---|---|---|
| y – Miami Heat | 44 | 29 | .603 | – | 29‍–‍7 | 15‍–‍22 | 10–4 | 73 |
| x – Orlando Magic | 33 | 40 | .452 | 11.0 | 18‍–‍17 | 15‍–‍23 | 9–5 | 73 |
| Washington Wizards | 25 | 47 | .347 | 18.5 | 16‍–‍20 | 9‍–‍27 | 5–9 | 72 |
| Charlotte Hornets | 23 | 42 | .354 | 17.0 | 10‍–‍21 | 13‍–‍21 | 2–7 | 65 |
| Atlanta Hawks | 20 | 47 | .299 | 21.0 | 14‍–‍20 | 6‍–‍27 | 6–7 | 67 |

=== Conference ===
Eastern Conference
| # | Team | W | L | PCT | GB | GP |
|---|---|---|---|---|---|---|
| 1 | z – Milwaukee Bucks * | 56 | 17 | .767 | – | 73 |
| 2 | y – Toronto Raptors * | 53 | 19 | .736 | 2.5 | 72 |
| 3 | x – Boston Celtics | 48 | 24 | .667 | 7.5 | 72 |
| 4 | x – Indiana Pacers | 45 | 28 | .616 | 11.0 | 73 |
| 5 | y – Miami Heat * | 44 | 29 | .603 | 12.0 | 73 |
| 6 | x – Philadelphia 76ers | 43 | 30 | .589 | 13.0 | 73 |
| 7 | x – Brooklyn Nets | 35 | 37 | .486 | 20.5 | 72 |
| 8 | x – Orlando Magic | 33 | 40 | .452 | 23.0 | 73 |
| 9 | Washington Wizards | 25 | 47 | .347 | 30.5 | 72 |
| 10 | Charlotte Hornets | 23 | 42 | .354 | 29.0 | 65 |
| 11 | Chicago Bulls | 22 | 43 | .338 | 30.0 | 65 |
| 12 | New York Knicks | 21 | 45 | .318 | 31.5 | 66 |
| 13 | Detroit Pistons | 20 | 46 | .303 | 32.5 | 66 |
| 14 | Atlanta Hawks | 20 | 47 | .299 | 33.0 | 67 |
| 15 | Cleveland Cavaliers | 19 | 46 | .292 | 33.0 | 65 |

== Game log ==
=== Preseason ===
2019 preseason game log
Total: 4–1 (home: 2–1; road: 2–0)
Preseason: 4–1 (home: 2–1; road: 2–0)

| Game | Date | Team | Score | High points | High rebounds | High assists | Location Attendance | Record |
|---|---|---|---|---|---|---|---|---|
| 1 | October 8 | San Antonio | W 107–89 | Tyler Herro (18) | Meyers Leonard (11) | Jimmy Butler (5) | AmericanAirlines Arena; 19,600 | 1–0 |
| 2 | October 9 | @ Charlotte | W 108–94 | Dion Waiters (19) | Davon Reed (9) | Kendrick Nunn (7) | Spectrum Center; 8,522 | 2–0 |
| 3 | October 14 | Atlanta | W 120–87 | Tyler Herro (23) | Bam Adebayo (10) | Dragić, Winslow (5) | AmericanAirlines Arena; 19,600 | 3–0 |
| 4 | October 17 | @ Orlando | W 107–98 | Jimmy Butler (23) | Bam Adebayo (13) | Justise Winslow (12) | Amway Center; 17,149 | 4–0 |
| 5 | October 18 | Houston | L 133–144 | Kendrick Nunn (40) | Bam Adebayo (11) | Goran Dragić (7) | American Airlines Arena; 19,600 | 4–1 |

2019–20 season schedule

=== Regular season ===
2019–20 game log
Total: 44–29 (home: 29–7; road: 15–22)
October: 4–1 (home: 2–0; road: 2–1)

| Game | Date | Team | Score | High points | High rebounds | High assists | Location Attendance | Record |
|---|---|---|---|---|---|---|---|---|
| 1 | October 23 | Memphis | W 120–101 | Justise Winslow (27) | Bam Adebayo (11) | Justise Winslow (7) | American Airlines Arena; 19,600 | 1–0 |
| 2 | October 26 | @ Milwaukee | W 131–126 (OT) | Goran Dragic (25) | Adebayo, Winslow (13) | Adebayo, Dragic (8) | Fiserv Forum; 17,467 | 2–0 |
| 3 | October 27 | @ Minnesota | L 109–116 | Kendrick Nunn (25) | Bam Adebayo (9) | Justise Winslow (6) | Target Center; 17,049 | 2–1 |
| 4 | October 29 | Atlanta | W 112–97 | Tyler Herro (29) | Adebayo, Leonard (10) | Adebayo, Dragic, Winslow, Nunn (3) | American Airlines Arena; 19,600 | 3–1 |
| 5 | October 31 | @ Atlanta | W 106–97 | Kendrick Nunn (28) | Jimmy Butler (9) | Jimmy Butler (11) | State Farm Arena; 16,539 | 4–1 |

November: 9–4 (home: 6–0; road: 3–4)

| Game | Date | Team | Score | High points | High rebounds | High assists | Location Attendance | Record |
|---|---|---|---|---|---|---|---|---|
| 6 | November 3 | Houston | W 129–100 | Duncan Robinson (23) | Kelly Olynyk (8) | Jimmy Butler (9) | American Airlines Arena; 19,724 | 5–1 |
| 7 | November 5 | @ Denver | L 89–109 | Jimmy Butler (16) | Bam Adebayo (11) | Goran Dragic (7) | Pepsi Center; 18,010 | 5–2 |
| 8 | November 7 | @ Phoenix | W 124–108 | Jimmy Butler (34) | Bam Adebayo (10) | Bam Adebayo (6) | Talking Stick Resort Arena; 15,498 | 6–2 |
| 9 | November 8 | @ L. A. Lakers | L 80–95 | Jimmy Butler (22) | Bam Adebayo (9) | Goran Dragic (7) | Staples Center; 18,997 | 6–3 |
| 10 | November 12 | Detroit | W 117–108 | Butler, Nunn (20) | Bam Adebayo (14) | Jimmy Butler (13) | American Airlines Arena; 19,600 | 7–3 |
| 11 | November 14 | @ Cleveland | W 108–97 | Kendrick Nunn (23) | Bam Adebayo (15) | Kendrick Nunn (8) | Rocket Mortgage FieldHouse; 17,374 | 8–3 |
| 12 | November 16 | New Orleans | W 109–94 | Kendrick Nunn (22) | Bam Adebayo (14) | Jimmy Butler (13) | American Airlines Arena; 19,600 | 9–3 |
| 13 | November 20 | Cleveland | W 124–100 | Duncan Robinson (29) | Chris Silva (9) | Dragic, Nunn (6) | American Airlines Arena; 19,600 | 10–3 |
| 14 | November 22 | @ Chicago | W 116–108 | Jimmy Butler (27) | Bam Adebayo (14) | Butler, Dragic (7) | United Center; 18,953 | 11–3 |
| 15 | November 23 | @ Philadelphia | L 86–113 | Tyler Herro (20) | Kelly Olynyk (7) | Butler, Silva (3) | Wells Fargo Center; 21,017 | 11–4 |
| 16 | November 25 | Charlotte | W 117–100 | Butler, Adebayo (21) | Kelly Olynyk (16) | Goran Dragić (9) | American Airlines Arena; 19,600 | 12–4 |
| 17 | November 27 | @ Houston | L 108–117 | Tyler Herro (22) | Bam Adebayo (11) | Bam Adebayo (8) | Toyota Center; 18,055 | 12–5 |
| 18 | November 29 | Golden State | W 122–105 | Goran Dragić (20) | Bam Adebayo (9) | Jimmy Butler (6) | American Airlines Arena; 19,600 | 13–5 |

December: 11–4 (home: 7–1; road: 4–3)

| Game | Date | Team | Score | High points | High rebounds | High assists | Location Attendance | Record |
|---|---|---|---|---|---|---|---|---|
| 19 | December 1 | @ Brooklyn | W 109–106 | Goran Dragić (24) | Bam Adebayo (16) | Goran Dragić (6) | Barclays Center; 17,026 | 14–5 |
| 20 | December 3 | @ Toronto | W 121–110 (OT) | Butler, Robinson (22) | Jimmy Butler (13) | Jimmy Butler (12) | Scotiabank Arena; 19,800 | 15–5 |
| 21 | December 4 | @ Boston | L 93–112 | Jimmy Butler (37) | Bam Adebayo (9) | Butler, Nunn, Winslow (4) | TD Garden; 19,156 | 15–6 |
| 22 | December 6 | Washington | W 112–103 | Jimmy Butler (28) | Bam Adebayo (14) | Jimmy Butler (11) | American Airlines Arena; 19,600 | 16–6 |
| 23 | December 8 | Chicago | W 110–105 (OT) | Tyler Herro (27) | Bam Adebayo (13) | Jimmy Butler (7) | American Airlines Arena; 19,600 | 17–6 |
| 24 | December 10 | Atlanta | W 135–121 (OT) | Kendrick Nunn (36) | Jimmy Butler (18) | Bam Adebayo (11) | American Airlines Arena; 19,600 | 18–6 |
| 25 | December 13 | L. A. Lakers | L 110–113 | Jimmy Butler (23) | Bam Adebayo (12) | Kendrick Nunn (7) | American Airlines Arena; 20,013 | 18–7 |
| 26 | December 14 | @ Dallas | W 122–118 (OT) | Jimmy Butler (27) | Bam Adebayo (11) | Bam Adebayo (10) | American Airlines Center; 20,333 | 19–7 |
| 27 | December 16 | @ Memphis | L 111–118 | Jimmy Butler (25) | Bam Adebayo (13) | Jimmy Butler (8) | FedExForum; 14,021 | 19–8 |
| 28 | December 18 | @ Philadelphia | W 108–104 | Kendrick Nunn (26) | Bam Adebayo (9) | Tyler Herro (7) | Wells Fargo Center; 20,715 | 20–8 |
| 29 | December 20 | New York | W 129–114 | Bam Adebayo (20) | Meyers Leonard (13) | Dragić, Butler (8) | American Airlines Arena; 19,704 | 21–8 |
| 30 | December 23 | Utah | W 107–104 | Jimmy Butler (20) | Bam Adebayo (12) | Bam Adebayo (6) | American Airlines Arena; 19,890 | 22–8 |
| 31 | December 27 | Indiana | W 113–112 | Jimmy Butler (20) | Bam Adebayo (15) | Dragić, Butler, Adebayo (6) | American Airlines Arena; 19,767 | 23–8 |
| 32 | December 28 | Philadelphia | W 117–116 (OT) | Jimmy Butler (25) | Jimmy Butler (9) | Jimmy Butler (9) | American Airlines Arena; 19,865 | 24–8 |
| 33 | December 30 | @ Washington | L 105–123 | Jimmy Butler (27) | Bam Adebayo (14) | Bam Adebayo (5) | Capital One Arena; 20,476 | 24–9 |

January: 8–6 (home: 6–2; road: 2–4)

| Game | Date | Team | Score | High points | High rebounds | High assists | Location Attendance | Record |
|---|---|---|---|---|---|---|---|---|
| 34 | January 2 | Toronto | W 84–76 | Bam Adebayo (15) | Bam Adebayo (14) | Kendrick Nunn (9) | American Airlines Arena; 19,939 | 25–9 |
| 35 | January 3 | @ Orlando | L 85–105 | Jimmy Butler (23) | Butler, Adebayo (10) | Jimmy Butler (7) | Amway Center; 17,198 | 25–10 |
| 36 | January 5 | Portland | W 122–111 | Goran Dragić (29) | Meyers Leonard (9) | Goran Dragić (13) | American Airlines Arena; 19,846 | 26–10 |
| 37 | January 8 | @ Indiana | W 122–108 | Tyler Herro (19) | Bam Adebayo (9) | Jimmy Butler (7) | Bankers Life Fieldhouse; 17,040 | 27–10 |
| 38 | January 10 | @ Brooklyn | L 113–117 | Jimmy Butler (33) | Jimmy Butler (9) | Bam Adebayo (7) | Barclays Center; 16,011 | 27–11 |
| 39 | January 12 | @ New York | L 121–124 | Jimmy Butler (25) | Jimmy Butler (10) | Jimmy Butler (6) | Madison Square Garden; 18,861 | 27–12 |
| 40 | January 15 | San Antonio | W 106–100 | Kendrick Nunn (33) | Bam Adebayo (13) | Bam Adebayo (7) | American Airlines Arena; 19,704 | 28–12 |
| 41 | January 17 | @ Oklahoma City | W 115–108 | Kendrick Nunn (22) | Jimmy Butler (10) | Jimmy Butler (7) | Chesapeake Energy Arena; 18,203 | 29–12 |
| 42 | January 19 | @ San Antonio | L 102–107 | Bam Adebayo (21) | Bam Adebayo (16) | Butler, Adebayo (6) | AT&T Center; 18,422 | 29–13 |
| 43 | January 20 | Sacramento | W 118–113 (OT) | Kendrick Nunn (22) | Bam Adebayo (11) | Kendrick Nunn (6) | American Airlines Arena; 19,600 | 30–13 |
| 44 | January 22 | Washington | W 134–129 (OT) | Tyler Herro (25) | Bam Adebayo (8) | Jimmy Butler (10) | American Airlines Arena; 19,600 | 31–13 |
| 45 | January 24 | L. A. Clippers | L 117–122 | Jimmy Butler (20) | Kelly Olynyk (9) | Bam Adebayo (9) | American Airlines Arena; 19,632 | 31–14 |
| 46 | January 27 | Orlando | W 113–92 | Duncan Robinson (21) | Bam Adebayo (10) | Bam Adebayo (10) | American Airlines Arena; 19,600 | 32–14 |
| 47 | January 28 | Boston | L 101–109 | Goran Dragić (23) | Bam Adebayo (10) | Goran Dragić (4) | American Airlines Arena; 19,704 | 32–15 |

February: 6–7 (home: 4–1; road: 2–6)

| Game | Date | Team | Score | High points | High rebounds | High assists | Location Attendance | Record |
|---|---|---|---|---|---|---|---|---|
| 48 | February 1 | @ Orlando | W 102–89 | Jimmy Butler (24) | Adebayo, Leonard (14) | Goran Dragić (6) | Amway Center; 18,846 | 33–15 |
| 49 | February 3 | Philadelphia | W 137–106 | Jimmy Butler (38) | Bam Adebayo (8) | Bam Adebayo (11) | American Airlines Arena; 19,725 | 34–15 |
| 50 | February 5 | @ L. A. Clippers | L 111–128 | Derrick Jones Jr. (25) | Bam Adebayo (11) | Jimmy Butler (7) | Staples Center; 19,068 | 34–16 |
| 51 | February 7 | @ Sacramento | L 97–105 | Bam Adebayo (26) | Bam Adebayo (7) | Duncan Robinson (6) | Golden 1 Center; 16,760 | 34–17 |
| 52 | February 9 | @ Portland | L 109–115 | Goran Dragić (27) | Bam Adebayo (12) | Adebayo, Dragić (7) | Moda Center; 19,726 | 34–18 |
| 53 | February 10 | @ Golden State | W 113–101 | Butler, Crowder (21) | Bam Adebayo (11) | Kelly Olynyk (11) | Chase Center; 18,064 | 35–18 |
| 54 | February 12 | @ Utah | L 101–116 | Jimmy Butler (25) | Bam Adebayo (11) | Adebayo, Dragić (5) | Vivint Smart Home Arena; 18,306 | 35–19 |
| 55 | February 20 | @ Atlanta | L 124–129 | Bam Adebayo (28) | Bam Adebayo (19) | Jimmy Butler (9) | State Farm Arena; 17,356 | 35–20 |
| 56 | February 22 | Cleveland | W 124–105 | Kendrick Nunn (24) | Udonis Haslem (5) | Bam Adebayo (9) | American Airlines Arena; 19,754 | 36–20 |
| 57 | February 24 | @ Cleveland | L 119–125 (OT) | Adebayo, Dragić (22) | Bam Adebayo (13) | Bam Adebayo (9) | Rocket Mortgage FieldHouse; 17,336 | 36–21 |
| 58 | February 26 | Minnesota | L 126–129 | Kendrick Nunn (24) | Bam Adebayo (10) | Jimmy Butler (9) | American Airlines Arena; 19,600 | 36–22 |
| 59 | February 28 | Dallas | W 126–118 | Jimmy Butler (26) | Bam Adebayo (11) | Kelly Olynyk (9) | American Airlines Arena; 19,704 | 37–22 |
| 60 | February 29 | Brooklyn | W 116–113 | Kendrick Nunn (21) | Bam Adebayo (12) | Goran Dragić (10) | American Airlines Arena; 19,600 | 38–22 |

March: 3–2 (home: 2–1; road: 1–1)

| Game | Date | Team | Score | High points | High rebounds | High assists | Location Attendance | Record |
|---|---|---|---|---|---|---|---|---|
| 61 | March 2 | Milwaukee | W 105–89 | Butler, Crowder (18) | Bam Adebayo (13) | Jimmy Butler (7) | American Airlines Arena; 19,600 | 39–22 |
| 62 | March 4 | Orlando | W 116–113 | Duncan Robinson (27) | Adebayo, Butler, Crowder (7) | Goran Dragić (9) | American Airlines Arena; 19,600 | 40–22 |
| 63 | March 6 | @ New Orleans | L 104–110 | Jimmy Butler (28) | Bam Adebayo (12) | Jimmy Butler (6) | Smoothie King Center; 18,384 | 40–23 |
| 64 | March 8 | @ Washington | W 100–89 | Bam Adebayo (27) | Bam Adebayo (14) | Bam Adebayo (6) | Capital One Arena; 18,135 | 41–23 |
| 65 | March 11 | Charlotte | L 98–109 | Kendrick Nunn (24) | Jae Crowder (10) | Bam Adebayo (10) | American Airlines Arena; 19,600 | 41–24 |

Seeding games: 3–5 (home: 2–2; road: 1–3)

| Game | Date | Team | Score | High points | High rebounds | High assists | Location Attendance | Record |
|---|---|---|---|---|---|---|---|---|
| 66 | August 1 | @ Denver | W 125–105 | Adebayo, Butler (22) | Bam Adebayo (9) | Jimmy Butler (7) | HP Field House; No In-Person Attendance | 42–24 |
| 67 | August 3 | Toronto | L 103–107 | Goran Dragić (25) | Bam Adebayo (8) | Butler, Dragić, Iguodala (5) | HP Field House; No In-Person Attendance | 42–25 |
| 68 | August 4 | Boston | W 112–106 | Adebayo, Robinson (21) | Bam Adebayo (12) | Kelly Olynyk (8) | HP Field House; No In-Person Attendance | 43–25 |
| 69 | August 6 | @ Milwaukee | L 116–130 | Duncan Robinson (21) | Andre Iguodala (7) | Andre Iguodala (8) | The Arena; No In-Person Attendance | 43–26 |
| 70 | August 8 | Phoenix | L 112–119 | Herro, Robinson (25) | Herro, Olynyk (8) | Tyler Herro (10) | Visa Athletic Center; No In-Person Attendance | 43–27 |
| 71 | August 10 | Indiana | W 114–92 | Jimmy Butler (19) | Jimmy Butler (11) | Goran Dragić (9) | Visa Athletic Center; No In-Person Attendance | 44–27 |
| 72 | August 12 | @ Oklahoma City | L 115–116 | Tyler Herro (30) | Tyler Herro (6) | Goran Dragić (6) | Visa Athletic Center; No In-Person Attendance | 44–28 |
| 73 | August 14 | @ Indiana | L 92–109 | Kendrick Nunn (23) | Chris Silva (11) | Kendrick Nunn (4) | The Arena; No In-Person Attendance | 44–29 |

Cancelled games

| Game | Date | Team | Score | High points | High rebounds | High assists | Location Attendance | Record |
|---|---|---|---|---|---|---|---|---|
| 66 | March 13 | New York | | | | | American Airlines Arena | |
| 67 | March 14 | Chicago | | | | | American Airlines Arena | |
| 68 | March 16 | @ Milwaukee | | | | | Fiserv Forum | |
| 69 | March 18 | @ Chicago | | | | | United Center | |
| 70 | March 20 | @ Indiana | | | | | Bankers Life Fieldhouse | |
| 71 | March 23 | Oklahoma City | | | | | American Airlines Arena | |
| 72 | March 25 | Denver | | | | | American Airlines Arena | |
| 73 | March 28 | Phoenix | | | | | American Airlines Arena | |
| 74 | March 30 | @ Charlotte | | | | | Spectrum Center | |
| 75 | April 1 | @ Boston | | | | | TD Garden | |
| 76 | April 3 | @ Detroit | | | | | Little Caesars Arena | |
| 77 | April 5 | @ New York | | | | | Madison Square Garden | |
| 78 | April 7 | Indiana | | | | | American Airlines Arena | |
| 79 | April 9 | Detroit | | | | | American Airlines Arena | |
| 80 | April 11 | Boston | | | | | American Airlines Arena | |
| 81 | April 13 | @ Charlotte | | | | | Spectrum Center | |
| 82 | April 14 | Toronto | | | | | American Airlines Arena | |

2019–20 season schedule

=== Playoffs ===
2020 playoff game log
Total: 14–7 (home: 6–4; road: 8–3)
First Round: 4–0 (home: 2–0; road: 2–0)

| Game | Date | Team | Score | High points | High rebounds | High assists | Location Attendance | Series |
|---|---|---|---|---|---|---|---|---|
| 1 | August 18 | @ Indiana | W 113–101 | Jimmy Butler (28) | Bam Adebayo (10) | Bam Adebayo (6) | AdventHealth Arena; No in-person attendance | 1–0 |
| 2 | August 20 | @ Indiana | W 109–100 | Duncan Robinson (24) | Jae Crowder (8) | Butler, Dragić (8) | The Field House; No in-person attendance | 2–0 |
| 3 | August 22 | Indiana | W 124–115 | Jimmy Butler (27) | Bam Adebayo (11) | Goran Dragić (6) | AdventHealth Arena; No in-person attendance | 3–0 |
| 4 | August 24 | Indiana | W 99–87 | Goran Dragić (23) | Bam Adebayo (19) | Bam Adebayo (6) | The Field House; No in-person attendance | 4–0 |

Conference semifinals: 4–1 (home: 1–1; road: 3–0)

| Game | Date | Team | Score | High points | High rebounds | High assists | Location Attendance | Series |
|---|---|---|---|---|---|---|---|---|
| 1 | August 31 | @ Milwaukee | W 115–104 | Jimmy Butler (40) | Bam Adebayo (17) | Bam Adebayo (6) | HP Field House; No in-person attendance | 1–0 |
| 2 | September 2 | @ Milwaukee | W 116–114 | Goran Dragić (23) | Bam Adebayo (9) | Jimmy Butler (6) | HP Field House; No in-person attendance | 2–0 |
| 3 | September 4 | Milwaukee | W 115–100 | Jimmy Butler (30) | Bam Adebayo (16) | Jimmy Butler (6) | HP Field House; No in-person attendance | 3–0 |
| 4 | September 6 | Milwaukee | L 115–118 (OT) | Bam Adebayo (26) | Bam Adebayo (12) | Adebayo, Dragić (8) | AdventHealth Arena; No in-person attendance | 3–1 |
| 5 | September 8 | @ Milwaukee | W 103–94 | Butler, Dragić (17) | Jimmy Butler (10) | Butler, Herro (6) | HP Field House; No in-person attendance | 4–1 |

Conference finals: 4–2 (home: 2–1; road: 2–1)

| Game | Date | Team | Score | High points | High rebounds | High assists | Location Attendance | Series |
|---|---|---|---|---|---|---|---|---|
| 1 | September 15 | @ Boston | W 117–114 (OT) | Goran Dragić (29) | Tyler Herro (11) | Adebayo, Herro (9) | HP Field House; No in-person attendance | 1–0 |
| 2 | September 17 | @ Boston | W 106–101 | Goran Dragić (25) | Bam Adebayo (10) | Dragić, Herro (5) | AdventHealth Arena; No in-person attendance | 2–0 |
| 3 | September 19 | Boston | L 106–117 | Bam Adebayo (27) | Bam Adebayo (16) | Crowder, Dragić (5) | AdventHealth Arena; No in-person attendance | 2–1 |
| 4 | September 23 | Boston | W 112–109 | Tyler Herro (37) | Bam Adebayo (12) | Bam Adebayo (4) | AdventHealth Arena; No in-person attendance | 3–1 |
| 5 | September 25 | @ Boston | L 108–121 | Goran Dragić (23) | Adebayo, Butler (8) | Adebayo, Butler (8) | AdventHealth Arena; No in-person attendance | 3–2 |
| 6 | September 27 | Boston | W 125–113 | Bam Adebayo (32) | Bam Adebayo (14) | Jimmy Butler (8) | AdventHealth Arena; No in-person attendance | 4–2 |

NBA Finals: 2–4 (home: 1–2; road: 1–2)

| Game | Date | Team | Score | High points | High rebounds | High assists | Location Attendance | Series |
|---|---|---|---|---|---|---|---|---|
| 1 | September 30 | @ L. A. Lakers | L 98–116 | Jimmy Butler (23) | Iguodala, Nunn, Olynyk (5) | Andre Iguodala (6) | The Arena; No In-Person Attendance | 0–1 |
| 2 | October 2 | @ L. A. Lakers | L 114–124 | Jimmy Butler (25) | Kelly Olynyk (9) | Jimmy Butler (13) | The Arena; No In-Person Attendance | 0–2 |
| 3 | October 4 | L. A. Lakers | W 115–104 | Jimmy Butler (40) | Jimmy Butler (11) | Jimmy Butler (12) | The Arena; No In-Person Attendance | 1–2 |
| 4 | October 6 | L. A. Lakers | L 96–102 | Jimmy Butler (22) | Jimmy Butler (10) | Jimmy Butler (9) | The Arena; No In-Person Attendance | 1–3 |
| 5 | October 9 | @ L. A. Lakers | W 111–108 | Jimmy Butler (35) | Jimmy Butler (12) | Jimmy Butler (11) | The Arena; No In-Person Attendance | 2–3 |
| 6 | October 11 | L. A. Lakers | L 93–106 | Bam Adebayo (25) | Bam Adebayo (10) | Jimmy Butler (8) | The Arena; No In-Person Attendance | 2–4 |

2020 playoff schedule

== Player statistics ==
=== Regular season ===
| Player | POS | GP | GS | MP | REB | AST | STL | BLK | PTS | MPG | RPG | APG | SPG | BPG | PPG |
|---|---|---|---|---|---|---|---|---|---|---|---|---|---|---|---|
| Duncan Robinson | SG | 73 | 68 | 2,166 | 232 | 102 | 35 | 19 | 983 | 29.7 | 3.2 | 1.4 | .5 | .3 | 13.5 |
| Bam Adebayo | PF | 72 | 72 | 2,417 | 735 | 368 | 82 | 93 | 1,146 | 33.6 | 10.2 | 5.1 | 1.1 | 1.3 | 15.9 |
| Kendrick Nunn | PG | 67 | 67 | 1,962 | 180 | 220 | 56 | 15 | 1,024 | 29.3 | 2.7 | 3.3 | .8 | .2 | 15.3 |
| Kelly Olynyk | C | 67 | 9 | 1,300 | 305 | 116 | 45 | 23 | 549 | 19.4 | 4.6 | 1.7 | .7 | .3 | 8.2 |
| Derrick Jones Jr. | SF | 59 | 16 | 1,375 | 233 | 62 | 58 | 38 | 500 | 23.3 | 3.9 | 1.1 | 1.0 | .6 | 8.5 |
| Goran Dragić | PG | 59 | 3 | 1,663 | 187 | 301 | 40 | 10 | 953 | 28.2 | 3.2 | 5.1 | .7 | .2 | 16.2 |
| Jimmy Butler | SF | 58 | 58 | 1,959 | 386 | 350 | 103 | 32 | 1,157 | 33.8 | 6.7 | 6.0 | 1.8 | .6 | 19.9 |
| Tyler Herro | SG | 55 | 8 | 1,508 | 224 | 121 | 34 | 9 | 743 | 27.4 | 4.1 | 2.2 | .6 | .2 | 13.5 |
| Meyers Leonard | C | 51 | 49 | 1,034 | 260 | 55 | 14 | 15 | 309 | 20.3 | 5.1 | 1.1 | .3 | .3 | 6.1 |
| Chris Silva | PF | 44 | 0 | 346 | 126 | 23 | 9 | 21 | 133 | 7.9 | 2.9 | .5 | .2 | .5 | 3.0 |
| Andre Iguodala | SF | 21 | 0 | 418 | 78 | 51 | 14 | 21 | 96 | 19.9 | 3.7 | 2.4 | .7 | 1.0 | 4.6 |
| Jae Crowder^{†} | PF | 20 | 8 | 553 | 107 | 36 | 25 | 10 | 237 | 27.7 | 5.4 | 1.8 | 1.3 | .5 | 11.9 |
| James Johnson^{†} | PF | 18 | 0 | 281 | 52 | 21 | 6 | 13 | 102 | 15.6 | 2.9 | 1.2 | .3 | .7 | 5.7 |
| Justise Winslow | SG | 11 | 5 | 352 | 73 | 44 | 7 | 5 | 124 | 32.0 | 6.6 | 4.0 | .6 | .5 | 11.3 |
| Solomon Hill^{†} | PF | 11 | 1 | 187 | 21 | 10 | 12 | 5 | 49 | 17.0 | 1.9 | .9 | 1.1 | .5 | 4.5 |
| Gabe Vincent | PG | 9 | 0 | 83 | 5 | 6 | 5 | 0 | 22 | 9.2 | .6 | .7 | .6 | .0 | 2.4 |
| KZ Okpala | PF | 5 | 0 | 26 | 5 | 1 | 2 | 1 | 7 | 5.2 | 1.0 | .2 | .4 | .2 | 1.4 |
| Udonis Haslem | C | 4 | 1 | 44 | 16 | 1 | 0 | 0 | 12 | 11.0 | 4.0 | .3 | .0 | .0 | 3.0 |
| Daryl Macon | PG | 4 | 0 | 14 | 0 | 1 | 0 | 0 | 3 | 3.5 | .0 | .3 | .0 | .0 | .8 |
| Dion Waiters^{†} | SG | 3 | 0 | 42 | 11 | 3 | 0 | 2 | 28 | 14.0 | 3.7 | 1.0 | .0 | .7 | 9.3 |
| Kyle Alexander | C | 2 | 0 | 13 | 3 | 0 | 0 | 0 | 2 | 6.5 | 1.5 | .0 | .0 | .0 | 1.0 |

- ^{†} Denotes player spent time with another team in the season. Stats reflect time with the Heat only.

=== Playoffs ===
| Player | POS | GP | GS | MP | REB | AST | STL | BLK | PTS | MPG | RPG | APG | SPG | BPG | PPG |
|---|---|---|---|---|---|---|---|---|---|---|---|---|---|---|---|
| Jimmy Butler | SF | 21 | 21 | 806 | 136 | 127 | 41 | 14 | 467 | 38.4 | 6.5 | 6.0 | 2.0 | .7 | 22.2 |
| Jae Crowder | PF | 21 | 21 | 660 | 117 | 39 | 14 | 12 | 252 | 31.4 | 5.6 | 1.9 | .7 | .6 | 12.0 |
| Duncan Robinson | SG | 21 | 21 | 600 | 58 | 38 | 14 | 6 | 245 | 28.6 | 2.8 | 1.8 | .7 | .3 | 11.7 |
| Tyler Herro | SG | 21 | 5 | 706 | 107 | 77 | 8 | 2 | 335 | 33.6 | 5.1 | 3.7 | .4 | .1 | 16.0 |
| Andre Iguodala | SF | 21 | 0 | 410 | 54 | 31 | 17 | 13 | 79 | 19.5 | 2.6 | 1.5 | .8 | .6 | 3.8 |
| Bam Adebayo | PF | 19 | 19 | 687 | 196 | 84 | 19 | 16 | 338 | 36.2 | 10.3 | 4.4 | 1.0 | .8 | 17.8 |
| Goran Dragić | PG | 17 | 16 | 553 | 69 | 75 | 17 | 2 | 324 | 32.5 | 4.1 | 4.4 | 1.0 | .1 | 19.1 |
| Kelly Olynyk | C | 17 | 0 | 258 | 79 | 19 | 4 | 8 | 130 | 15.2 | 4.6 | 1.1 | .2 | .5 | 7.6 |
| Kendrick Nunn | PG | 15 | 0 | 239 | 32 | 20 | 3 | 3 | 92 | 15.9 | 2.1 | 1.3 | .2 | .2 | 6.1 |
| Derrick Jones Jr. | SF | 15 | 0 | 97 | 12 | 7 | 6 | 5 | 22 | 6.5 | .8 | .5 | .4 | .3 | 1.5 |
| Solomon Hill | PF | 7 | 0 | 42 | 7 | 3 | 1 | 0 | 12 | 6.0 | 1.0 | .4 | .1 | .0 | 1.7 |
| Meyers Leonard | C | 3 | 2 | 31 | 1 | 3 | 1 | 0 | 14 | 10.3 | .3 | 1.0 | .3 | .0 | 4.7 |
| Gabe Vincent | PG | 1 | 0 | 0 | 0 | 0 | 0 | 0 | 0 | .0 | .0 | .0 | .0 | .0 | .0 |

== Transactions ==
=== Trades ===
June 19, 2019
To Miami Heat

Draft rights to #44 pick (Sudan) / (United States) Bol Bol

To Atlanta Hawks

2024 conditional second-round pick
Cash Considerations

June 20, 2019
To Miami Heat

2022 second round pick (from Denver or Philadelphia)
Cash Considerations

To Denver Nuggets

Draft rights to #44 pick (Sudan) / (United States) Bol Bol

July 6, 2019
Three–team trade
To Miami Heat

Draft rights to #32 pick (United States) KZ Okpala (from Phoenix)

To Indiana Pacers

(United States) T. J. Warren (from Phoenix)
2022 second-round pick (from Miami)
2025 second-round pick (from Miami)
2026 second-round pick (from Miami)

To Phoenix Suns

Cash Considerations (from Indiana)

July 6, 2019
Four–team trade
To Miami Heat

(United States) Jimmy Butler (Sign and trade from Philadelphia)
(United States) Meyers Leonard (from Portland)
Cash Considerations (from L.A. Clippers)

To Los Angeles Clippers

(United States) Maurice Harkless (from Portland)
(France) Mathias Lessort (Draft rights from Philadelphia)

2023 protected first-round pick (from Miami)

To Portland Trail Blazers

(United States) Hassan Whiteside (from Miami)

To Philadelphia 76ers

(United States) Josh Richardson (from Miami)

=== Free agents ===
==== Re-signed ====
| Player | Date Signed | Contract | Ref. |

==== Additions ====
| Player | Signed | Contract | Former Team |
|---|---|---|---|
| Jimmy Butler | June 30 (sign & trade) | 4 years, $142,000,000 | Philadelphia 76ers |
| Meyers Leonard | July 1 (sign & trade) | 1 year, $11,000,000 | Portland Trail Blazers |

==== Subtractions ====
| Player | Reason Left | New Team | Ref. |
|---|---|---|---|
| Dwyane Wade | Retired | —N/a | |
| Josh Richardson | Sign & Trade | Philadelphia 76ers | |
| Hassan Whiteside | Sign & Trade | Portland Trail Blazers | |
