= Zach Norvell Jr. =

American basketball player (born 1997)

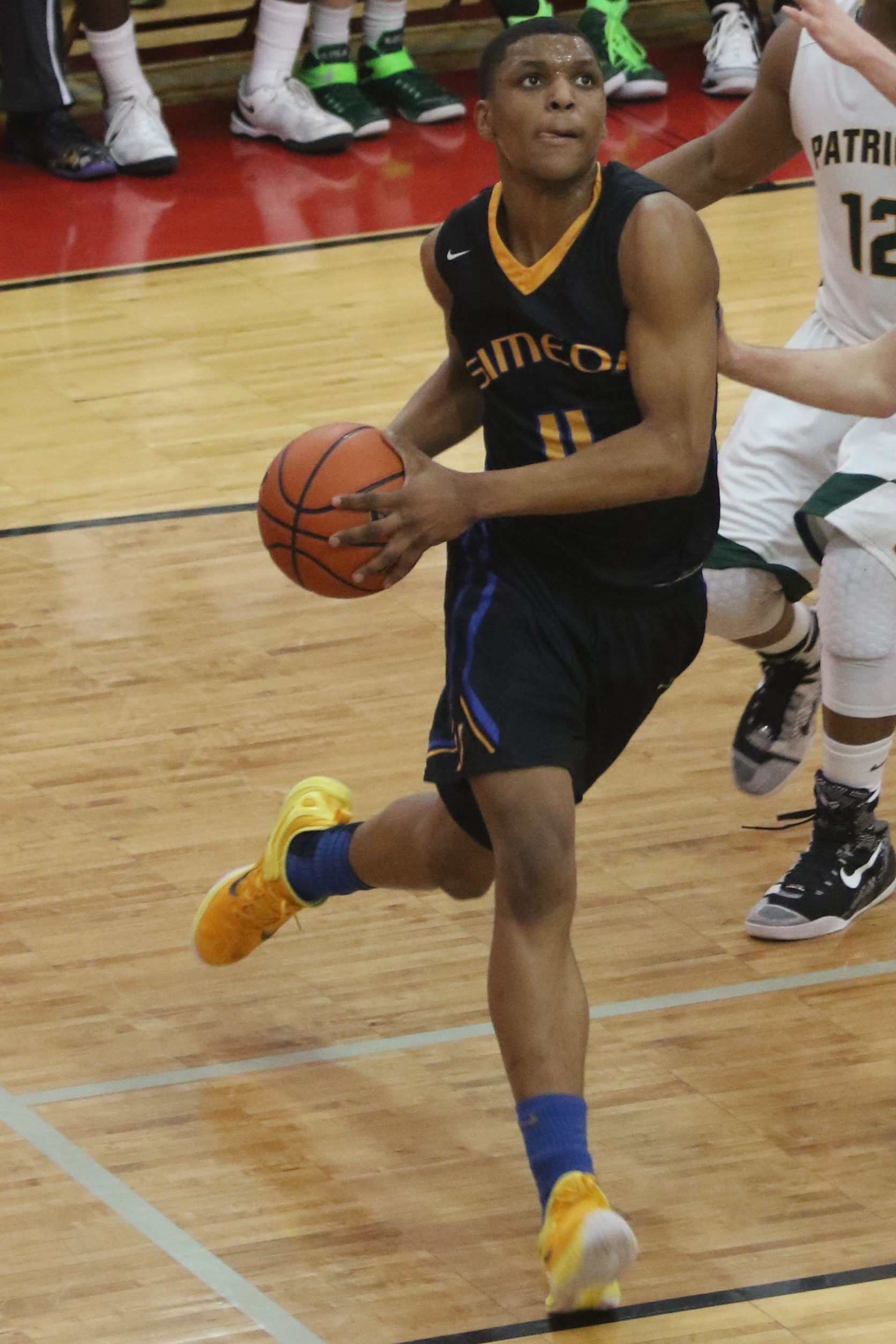
- Norvell for Simeon Career Academy in 2015

Gonzaga Bulldogs
- Title: Assistant coach
- League: West Coast Conference

Personal information
- Born: December 9, 1997 (age 28) Chicago, Illinois, U.S.
- Listed height: 6 ft 5 in (1.96 m)
- Listed weight: 205 lb (93 kg)

Career information
- High school: Simeon (Chicago, Illinois)
- College: Gonzaga (2017–2019)
- NBA draft: 2019: undrafted
- Playing career: 2019–2021
- Position: Shooting guard / small forward
- Number: 21
- Coaching career: 2022–present

Career history

Playing
- 2019: Los Angeles Lakers
- 2019: →South Bay Lakers
- 2019–2020: South Bay Lakers
- 2020: Golden State Warriors
- 2020: South Bay Lakers
- 2020–2021: Santa Cruz Warriors

Coaching
- 2022–2023: Gonzaga (GA)
- 2023–present: Gonzaga (assistant)

Career highlights
- First-team All-WCC (2019); WCC Newcomer of the Year (2018); WCC All-Freshman Team (2018)
- Stats at NBA.com
- Stats at Basketball Reference

Zachary Norvell Jr. (born December 9, 1997) is an American basketball coach and former professional basketball player. He played college basketball for the Gonzaga Bulldogs. He played in the National Basketball Association (NBA) for the Los Angeles Lakers and Golden State Warriors and both of their NBA G League affiliates. He is currently an assistant coach for Gonzaga.

== Early life ==
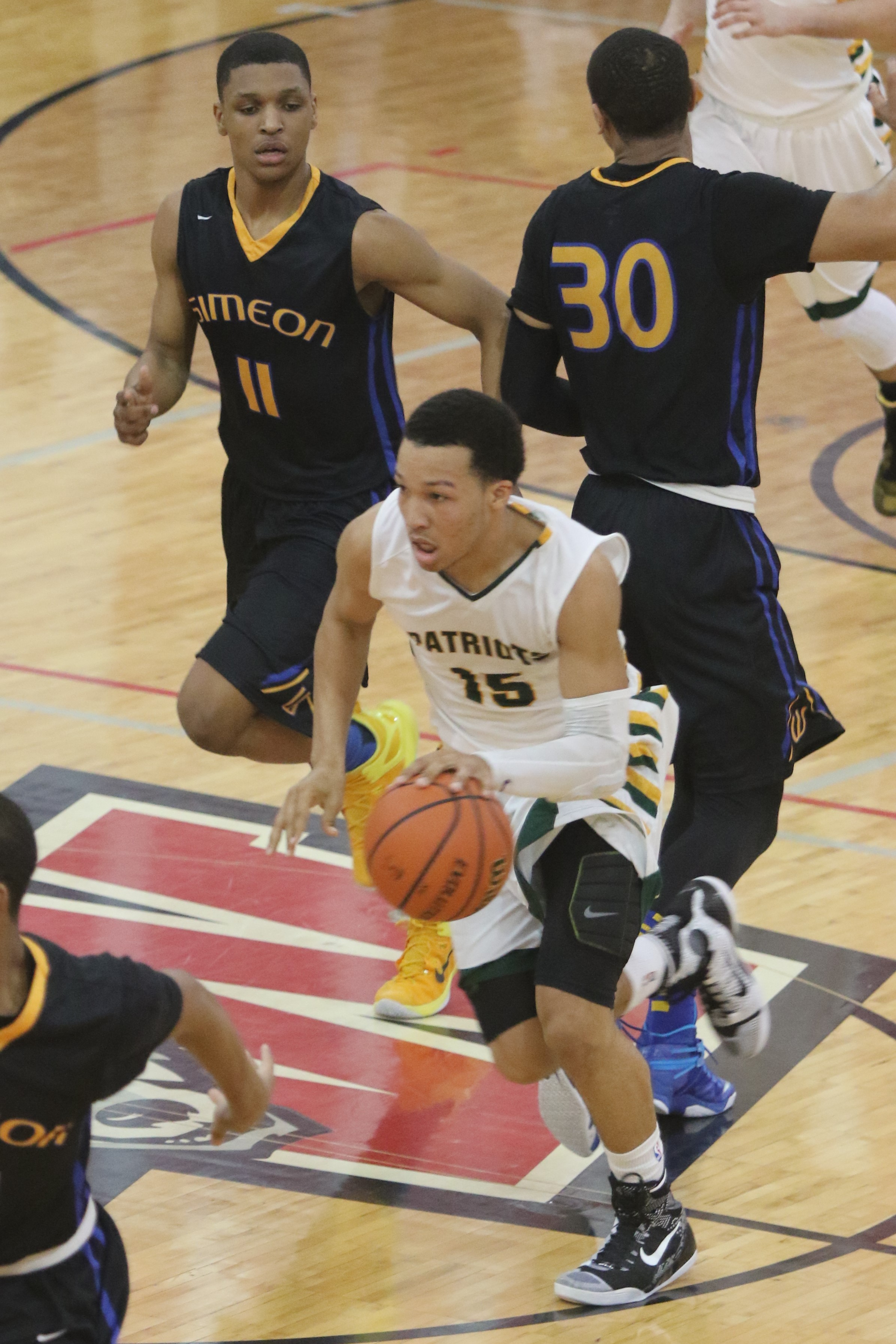
Norvell chasing Jalen Brunson in 2015

Norvell is the son of Tonja Hall and Zachary Norvell, who played basketball in college at Northeastern Illinois (until the program was disbanded in 1998) and New Mexico State and coaches at DuSable High School. Growing up, the younger Norvell was an accomplished baseball player but decided to quit to focus on basketball. At Simeon Career Academy, Norvell played limited minutes as a freshman behind Jaylon Tate and Kendrick Nunn. As a junior, Norvell averaged nearly 13 points, four rebounds and three assists per game and was a Chicago Tribune All-State special mention selection in 2015. He played some time at point guard due to injury problems. He scored 53 points in an AAU game for Mac Irvin Fire in Las Vegas in July 2015, increasing his recruiting stock. Norvell ended up committing to Gonzaga, choosing the Bulldogs over offers from Florida State, Georgetown and Iowa State. Norvell was No. 76 in ESPN's Top 100 rankings and was nominated for the McDonald's All-American Game.

== College career ==
Norvell underwent leg surgery before arriving at Gonzaga for his freshman season. Norvell redshirted during his first season at Gonzaga, partially so he could recover from his leg injury. Despite his redshirt, he was allowed to play an exhibition game against West Georgia, where he was able to score 18 points.

Coming into his redshirt freshman season, Norvell was named to the Julius Erving Award watch list. During his redshirt freshman season, Norvell was able to become a breakout star of the NCAA tournament, leading his team by scoring 21.5 points per game during the first 2 games of the tournament. He was also able to make a game tying three-pointer against UNC Greensboro and recorded his first career double-double against Ohio State with 28 points and 12 rebounds. On the season, Norvell averaged 12.7 points, 3.9 rebounds, and 2.4 assists per game. He was named West Coast Conference Newcomer of the Year.

Coming into his sophomore season, Norvell was named to the Preseason All-WCC Team. He was named to the preseason John R. Wooden Award and Jerry West Award watchlists. At Gonzaga, he was known by the nickname "Snacks". He posted a career-high 28 points against Creighton on December 1, 2018. He was named to the 2018–19 All-West Coast Conference first team along with teammates Rui Hachimura, Brandon Clarke and Josh Perkins. Following the season, he declared for the 2019 NBA draft. He was invited to the NBA Draft Combine. On May 9, he announced his intention to remain in the draft.

== Professional career ==
=== Los Angeles Lakers (2019) ===
Norvell went undrafted during the 2019 NBA draft. On July 1, 2019, Norvell signed with the Los Angeles Lakers to a two-way contract. On October 25, 2019, Norvell made his debut in NBA, coming off from bench in a 95–86 win over the Utah Jazz with a rebound. Norvell was waived on December 11, 2019.

=== South Bay Lakers (2019–2020) ===
On December 17, 2019, Norvell was acquired by the South Bay Lakers. Norvell averaged 15.2 points, 4.5 rebounds and 3.0 assists in his 29 appearances (17 starts).

=== Golden State Warriors (2020) ===
On February 8, 2020, Norvell signed a 10-day contract with the Golden State Warriors. Although he had appeared in a pair of games for the Lakers, Norvell scored his first points on February 8, when he posted seven points, four rebounds, two assists and two steals in a 17-minute plus 10 debut for the Warriors against the Los Angeles Lakers.

=== Santa Cruz Warriors (2020–2021) ===
On February 21, 2020, the Santa Cruz Warriors announced that they had acquired Norvell from the South Bay Lakers for the returning right to Juan Toscano-Anderson and a 2021 1st-round draft pick in the 2021 NBA G League Draft. In his debut for Santa Cruz, Norvell scored a career-high 34 points shooting 7-of-12 from behind the arc while also contributing five rebounds and four assists in a 128–122 loss to the South Bay Lakers.

On November 26, 2020, Norvell signed a one-year contract with the Chicago Bulls. He was waived at the conclusion of training camp.

On January 12, 2021, Norvell was included in roster of Santa Cruz Warriors which would participate the 2020–21 season in the ESPN Wide World of Sports Complex of Walt Disney World Resort located near Orlando. He was released on February 17, 2021, after suffering a season-ending injury.

== Coaching career ==
Norvell returned to the 2022–23 Gonzaga Bulldogs men's basketball team to serve as a student assistant and complete his degree. He became a full-time assistant coach for the 2023–24 Gonzaga Bulldogs men's basketball team.

== Career statistics ==
Legend
GP	Games played	GS	Games started	MPG	Minutes per game
FG%	Field goal percentage	3P%	3-point field goal percentage	FT%	Free throw percentage
RPG	Rebounds per game	APG	Assists per game	SPG	Steals per game
BPG	Blocks per game	PPG	Points per game	**Bold**	Career high

=== NBA ===
==== Regular season ====
Year	Team	GP	GS	MPG	FG%	3P%	FT%	RPG	APG	SPG	BPG	PPG
2019–20	L.A. Lakers	2	0	2.5	.000	.000	.000	.5	.0	.0	.0	0.0
2019–20	Golden State	**3**	0	**12.0**	**.273**	**.375**	**1.000**	**1.7**	**1.0**	**.7**	.0	**3.3**
Career		5	0	8.2	.250	.375	1.000	1.2	.6	.4	.0	2.0

=== College ===
Year	Team	GP	GS	MPG	FG%	3P%	FT%	RPG	APG	SPG	BPG	PPG
2017–18	Gonzaga	**37**	29	27.0	**.456**	.370	.800	3.9	2.3	1.1	**.1**	12.7
2018–19	Gonzaga	**37**	**36**	**30.7**	.435	**.372**	**.867**	**4.3**	**3.1**	**1.3**	**.1**	**14.9**
Career		74	65	28.8	.445	.371	.836	4.1	2.7	1.2	.1	13.8
