= 2019–20 Los Angeles Lakers season =

American professional basketball season

- NBA champions
- Conference champions
- Division champions
- Head coach: Frank Vogel
- President: Jeanie Buss
- General manager: Rob Pelinka
- Owners: Jerry Buss family trust (primary owner being Jeanie Buss since March 27, 2017)
- Arena: Staples Center

Results
- Record: 52–19 (.732)
- Place: Division: 1st (Pacific); Conference: 1st (Western)
- Playoff finish: NBA champions (defeated Heat 4–2)
- Stats at Basketball Reference

Local media
- Television: Spectrum SportsNet
- Radio: ESPN LA 710 (English); 1020 Radio AM (Spanish)

The 2019–20 Los Angeles Lakers season was the franchise's 72nd season, its 71st season in the National Basketball Association (NBA), and its 60th in Los Angeles. The Lakers were coached by Frank Vogel in his first year as team head coach. The team played its home games at Staples Center as members of the Western Conference's Pacific Division.

The team dedicated the season to retired Lakers superstar Kobe Bryant, who was killed in a helicopter crash on January 26, 2020. On March 6, 2020, the Lakers clinched their first playoff berth since the 2012–13 season. Five days later, due to the ongoing COVID-19 pandemic, the season was suspended. On July 5, the NBA announced a return of the season in the NBA Bubble, with 22 teams playing eight seeding games followed by a full postseason. Play resumed on July 30, with all games being played in Orlando, Florida. On August 3, the Lakers clinched the top seed in the Western Conference playoffs for the first time since the 2009–10 season.

The Lakers finished the shortened season 52–19, with a winning percentage roughly equivalent to 60 wins in a full season. They defeated the Portland Trail Blazers, Houston Rockets, and Denver Nuggets to advance to the NBA Finals, where they defeated the Miami Heat (LeBron James' former team) in six games to earn the franchise's 17th NBA championship. The Lakers also became the first and only team in NBA history to be undefeated in a season when leading entering the fourth quarter, going a combined 57–0 record in the regular season and playoffs.

== Previous season ==
In the 2018–19 season the Lakers amassed a record of 37–45. The team finished in fourth place in the Pacific Division and failed to qualify for the playoffs for the sixth consecutive year. The season marked the first time since 2005 that Lakers star LeBron James did not appear in the playoffs and first time since 2010 that he missed the Finals.

== Offseason ==
=== Front office and coaching changes ===
On April 9, 2019, Magic Johnson stepped down as president of basketball operations. Three days after that, coach Luke Walton and the team agreed to part ways. On May 13, the team hired Frank Vogel as their new head coach and Jason Kidd was named an assistant coach.

=== Draft ===
Round	Pick	Player	Position	Nationality	School / Club team
1	4	De'Andre Hunter	SF	American	Virginia

The Lakers held one first-round draft pick in the 2019 NBA Draft. The Lakers initially held the rights to two second-round picks in the 2019 draft as well, but later traded those picks to the Philadelphia 76ers and Atlanta Hawks, respectively. On the night of the NBA draft lottery, the Lakers received the fourth overall pick in the draft; the team had been projected to receive the 11th overall pick. The Lakers used the fourth overall draft pick to select De'Andre Hunter; the team later sent the rights to Hunter to the New Orleans Pelicans in a trade that brought Anthony Davis to Los Angeles.

=== Trades ===
On June 15, 2019, the Lakers agreed to acquire six-time NBA All-Star power forward Anthony Davis from the New Orleans Pelicans. (The deal did not take full effect until July 6). In exchange for Davis, the Lakers gave up forward Brandon Ingram, guards Lonzo Ball and Josh Hart, and three first-round picks (including De'Andre Hunter, the No. 4 draft overall selection in 2019). On June 27, the Washington Wizards joined the trade, obtaining Moritz Wagner, Isaac Bonga, Jemerrio Jones, and a 2022 second-round pick from the Lakers in exchange for cash considerations.

=== Free agents ===
During the offseason, the Lakers re-signed guard Rajon Rondo, guard Alex Caruso, guard/forward Kentavious Caldwell-Pope, and center JaVale McGee. The Lakers also signed several veteran free agents to complement James and Davis; those veteran free agents included guard/forward Danny Green, guard Avery Bradley, and center Dwight Howard.

== Preseason ==
=== Game log ===
2019 preseason game log
Total: 3–3 (Home: 2–2; Road: 1–1)
Preseason: 3–3 (home: 2–2; road: 1–1)

Game	Date	Team	Score	High points	High rebounds	High assists	Location Attendance	Record
1	October 5	@ Golden State	W 123–101	Anthony Davis (22)	JaVale McGee (13)	LeBron James (8)	Chase Center; 18,064	1–0
2	October 10	Brooklyn	L 111–114	LeBron James (20)	JaVale McGee (10)	Alex Caruso (8)	Mercedes-Benz Arena; 15,992	1–1
3	October 12	Brooklyn	L 77–91	Avery Bradley (14)	Howard, Caldwell-Pope (6)	Alex Caruso (5)	Universiade Sports Center; 17,396	1–2
4	October 14	Golden State	W 104–98	Zach Norvell Jr. (22)	Dwight Howard (13)	David Stockton (7)	Staples Center; 18,997	2–2
5	October 16	Golden State	W 126–93	James, Bradley (18)	Anthony Davis (10)	LeBron James (11)	Staples Center; 18,997	3–2
6	October 18	@ Golden State	L 103–124	Kentavious Caldwell-Pope (25)	Devontae Cacok (10)	Demetrius Jackson (9)	Chase Center; 18,064	3–3

2019–20 season schedule

== Regular season ==
=== Standings ===
==== Division ====
Pacific Division	W	L	PCT	GB	Home	Road	Div	GP
c – Los Angeles Lakers	52	19	.732	–	25‍–‍10	27‍–‍9	10–3	71
x – Los Angeles Clippers	49	23	.681	3.5	27‍–‍9	22‍–‍14	8–6	72
Phoenix Suns	34	39	.466	19.0	17‍–‍22	17‍–‍17	6–9	73
Sacramento Kings	31	41	.431	21.5	16‍–‍19	15‍–‍22	8–5	72
Golden State Warriors	15	50	.231	34.0	8‍–‍26	7‍–‍24	2–11	65

==== Conference ====
Western Conference
#	Team	W	L	PCT	GB	GP
1	c – Los Angeles Lakers *	52	19	.732	–	71
2	x – Los Angeles Clippers	49	23	.681	3.5	72
3	y – Denver Nuggets *	46	27	.630	7.0	73
4	y – Houston Rockets *	44	28	.611	8.5	72
5	x – Oklahoma City Thunder	44	28	.611	8.5	72
6	x – Utah Jazz	44	28	.611	8.5	72
7	x – Dallas Mavericks	43	32	.573	11.0	75
8	x – Portland Trail Blazers	35	39	.473	18.5	74
9	pi – Memphis Grizzlies	34	39	.466	19.0	73
10	Phoenix Suns	34	39	.466	19.0	73
11	San Antonio Spurs	32	39	.451	20.0	71
12	Sacramento Kings	31	41	.431	21.5	72
13	New Orleans Pelicans	30	42	.417	22.5	72
14	Minnesota Timberwolves	19	45	.297	29.5	64
15	Golden State Warriors	15	50	.231	34.0	65

=== Game log ===
2019–20 game log
Total: 52–19 (Home: 25–10; Road: 27–9)
October: 3–1 (home: 3–0; road: 0–1)

Game	Date	Team	Score	High points	High rebounds	High assists	Location Attendance	Record
1	October 22	@ L. A. Clippers	L 102–112	Danny Green (28)	Anthony Davis (10)	LeBron James (8)	Staples Center; 19,068	0–1
2	October 25	Utah	W 95–86	LeBron James (32)	James, Davis, Howard (7)	LeBron James (10)	Staples Center; 18,997	1–1
3	October 27	Charlotte	W 120–101	Anthony Davis (29)	Anthony Davis (14)	LeBron James (12)	Staples Center; 18,997	2–1
4	October 29	Memphis	W 120–91	Anthony Davis (40)	Anthony Davis (20)	LeBron James (8)	Staples Center; 18,997	3–1

November: 14–1 (home: 6–1; road: 8–0)

Game	Date	Team	Score	High points	High rebounds	High assists	Location Attendance	Record
5	November 1	@ Dallas	W 119–110 (OT)	LeBron James (39)	LeBron James (12)	LeBron James (16)	American Airlines Center; 20,358	4–1
6	November 3	@ San Antonio	W 103–96	Anthony Davis (25)	Dwight Howard (13)	LeBron James (13)	AT&T Center; 18,610	5–1
7	November 5	@ Chicago	W 118–112	LeBron James (30)	LeBron James (10)	LeBron James (11)	United Center; 21,193	6–1
8	November 8	Miami	W 95–80	Anthony Davis (26)	JaVale McGee (10)	Anthony Davis (7)	Staples Center; 18,997	7–1
9	November 10	Toronto	L 104–113	Anthony Davis (27)	LeBron James (13)	LeBron James (15)	Staples Center; 18,997	7–2
10	November 12	@ Phoenix	W 123–115	Anthony Davis (24)	Anthony Davis (12)	LeBron James (11)	Talking Stick Resort Arena; 18,055	8–2
11	November 13	Golden State	W 120–94	LeBron James (23)	JaVale McGee (17)	LeBron James (12)	Staples Center; 18,997	9–2
12	November 15	Sacramento	W 99–97	LeBron James (29)	Howard, McGee (7)	LeBron James (11)	Staples Center; 18,997	10–2
13	November 17	Atlanta	W 122–101	LeBron James (33)	Dwight Howard (9)	LeBron James (12)	Staples Center; 18,997	11–2
14	November 19	Oklahoma City	W 112–107	Anthony Davis (34)	LeBron James (11)	James, Rondo (10)	Staples Center; 18,997	12–2
15	November 22	@ Oklahoma City	W 130–127	Anthony Davis (33)	Anthony Davis (11)	LeBron James (14)	Chesapeake Energy Arena; 18,203	13–2
16	November 23	@ Memphis	W 109–108	LeBron James (30)	Dwight Howard (9)	Rajon Rondo (6)	FedExForum; 17,794	14–2
17	November 25	@ San Antonio	W 114–104	LeBron James (33)	Anthony Davis (12)	LeBron James (14)	AT&T Center; 18,498	15–2
18	November 27	@ New Orleans	W 114–110	Anthony Davis (41)	Anthony Davis (9)	LeBron James (11)	Smoothie King Center; 18,626	16–2
19	November 29	Washington	W 125–103	Anthony Davis (26)	Anthony Davis (13)	LeBron James (11)	Staples Center; 18,997	17–2

December: 9–5 (home: 2–3; road: 7–2)

Game	Date	Team	Score	High points	High rebounds	High assists	Location Attendance	Record
20	December 1	Dallas	L 100–114	Anthony Davis (27)	Davis, McGee (10)	LeBron James (8)	Staples Center; 18,997	17–3
21	December 3	@ Denver	W 105–96	Davis, James (25)	Anthony Davis (10)	LeBron James (9)	Pepsi Center; 19,658	18–3
22	December 4	@ Utah	W 121–96	Anthony Davis (26)	Howard, Rondo (9)	James, Rondo (12)	Vivint Smart Home Arena; 18,306	19–3
23	December 6	@ Portland	W 136–113	Anthony Davis (39)	Dwight Howard (10)	LeBron James (8)	Moda Center; 19,912	20–3
24	December 8	Minnesota	W 142–125	Anthony Davis (50)	Danny Green (8)	LeBron James (13)	Staples Center; 18,997	21–3
25	December 11	@ Orlando	W 96–87	LeBron James (25)	Anthony Davis (12)	LeBron James (10)	Amway Center; 18,846	22–3
26	December 13	@ Miami	W 113–110	Anthony Davis (33)	Davis, McGee (10)	LeBron James (12)	American Airlines Arena; 20,013	23–3
27	December 15	@ Atlanta	W 101–96	LeBron James (32)	Davis, James (13)	LeBron James (7)	State Farm Arena; 16,962	24–3
28	December 17	@ Indiana	L 102–105	Howard, James (20)	LeBron James (9)	LeBron James (9)	Bankers Life Fieldhouse; 17,923	24–4
29	December 19	@ Milwaukee	L 104–111	Anthony Davis (36)	LeBron James (12)	LeBron James (11)	Fiserv Forum; 18,051	24–5
30	December 22	Denver	L 104–128	Anthony Davis (32)	Anthony Davis (11)	Rajon Rondo (8)	Staples Center; 18,997	24–6
31	December 25	L. A. Clippers	L 106–111	Kyle Kuzma (25)	Howard, James (9)	LeBron James (10)	Staples Center; 18,997	24–7
32	December 28	@ Portland	W 128–120	Kyle Kuzma (24)	Anthony Davis (9)	LeBron James (16)	Moda Center; 19,960	25–7
33	December 29	Dallas	W 108–95	Anthony Davis (23)	Anthony Davis (9)	LeBron James (13)	Staples Center; 18,997	26–7

January: 10–4 (home: 5–2; road: 5–2)

Game	Date	Team	Score	High points	High rebounds	High assists	Location Attendance	Record
34	January 1	Phoenix	W 117–107	LeBron James (31)	LeBron James (13)	LeBron James (12)	Staples Center; 18,997	27–7
35	January 3	New Orleans	W 123–113	Anthony Davis (46)	Anthony Davis (13)	LeBron James (15)	Staples Center; 18,997	28–7
36	January 5	Detroit	W 106–99	Anthony Davis (24)	LeBron James (14)	LeBron James (11)	Staples Center; 18,997	29–7
37	January 7	New York	W 117–87	LeBron James (31)	Dwight Howard (13)	Rajon Rondo (10)	Staples Center; 18,997	30–7
38	January 10	@ Dallas	W 129–114	LeBron James (35)	LeBron James (16)	LeBron James (7)	American Airlines Center; 20,542	31–7
39	January 11	@ Oklahoma City	W 125–110	Kyle Kuzma (36)	Dwight Howard (14)	Rajon Rondo (8)	Chesapeake Energy Arena; 18,203	32–7
40	January 13	Cleveland	W 128–99	LeBron James (31)	Dwight Howard (15)	LeBron James (8)	Staples Center; 18,997	33–7
41	January 15	Orlando	L 118–119	Quinn Cook (22)	Dwight Howard (16)	LeBron James (19)	Staples Center; 18,997	33–8
42	January 18	@ Houston	W 124–115	LeBron James (31)	Dwight Howard (10)	LeBron James (12)	Toyota Center; 18,502	34–8
43	January 20	@ Boston	L 107–139	JaVale McGee (18)	Dwight Howard (10)	LeBron James (13)	TD Garden; 19,156	34–9
44	January 22	@ New York	W 100–92	Anthony Davis (28)	Dwight Howard (12)	Davis, James (5)	Madison Square Garden; 19,812	35–9
45	January 23	@ Brooklyn	W 128–113	LeBron James (27)	Howard, James (12)	James, Rondo (10)	Barclays Center; 17,732	36–9
46	January 25	@ Philadelphia	L 91–108	Anthony Davis (31)	Davis, James (7)	LeBron James (8)	Wells Fargo Center; 21,109	36–10
—	January 28	LA Clippers	Postponed due to the 2020 Calabasas helicopter crash that killed Kobe Bryant. Makeup date July 30 (originally April 9).					
47	January 31	Portland	L 119–127	Anthony Davis (37)	Davis, Kuzma (15)	LeBron James (10)	Staples Center; 18,997	36–11

February: 9–2 (home: 5–1; road: 4–1)

Game	Date	Team	Score	High points	High rebounds	High assists	Location Attendance	Record
48	February 1	@ Sacramento	W 129–113	Anthony Davis (21)	LeBron James (10)	LeBron James (11)	Golden 1 Center; 17,583	37–11
49	February 4	San Antonio	W 129–102	LeBron James (36)	Kyle Kuzma (12)	LeBron James (9)	Staples Center; 18,997	38–11
50	February 6	Houston	L 111–121	Anthony Davis (32)	Anthony Davis (13)	LeBron James (15)	Staples Center; 18,997	38–12
51	February 8	@ Golden State	W 125–120	Anthony Davis (27)	Anthony Davis (10)	LeBron James (11)	Chase Center; 18,064	39–12
52	February 10	Phoenix	W 125–100	Anthony Davis (25)	Dwight Howard (15)	LeBron James (9)	Staples Center; 18,997	40–12
53	February 12	@ Denver	W 120–116 (OT)	Anthony Davis (33)	LeBron James (12)	LeBron James (14)	Pepsi Center; 19,860	41–12
54	February 21	Memphis	W 117–105	LeBron James (32)	Anthony Davis (13)	LeBron James (7)	Staples Center; 18,997	42–12
55	February 23	Boston	W 114–112	Anthony Davis (32)	Anthony Davis (13)	LeBron James (9)	Staples Center; 18,997	43–12
56	February 25	New Orleans	W 118–109	LeBron James (40)	Anthony Davis (14)	Alex Caruso (8)	Staples Center; 18,997	44–12
57	February 27	@ Golden State	W 116–86	Anthony Davis (23)	Dwight Howard (9)	Rajon Rondo (6)	Chase Center; 18,064	45–12
58	February 29	@ Memphis	L 88–105	LeBron James (19)	Anthony Davis (9)	LeBron James (10)	FedExForum; 17,794	45–13

March: 4–1 (home: 2–1; road: 2–0)

Game	Date	Team	Score	High points	High rebounds	High assists	Location Attendance	Record
59	March 1	@ New Orleans	W 122–114	LeBron James (34)	LeBron James (12)	LeBron James (13)	Smoothie King Center; 18,547	46–13
60	March 3	Philadelphia	W 120–107	Anthony Davis (37)	Anthony Davis (13)	LeBron James (14)	Staples Center; 18,997	47–13
61	March 6	Milwaukee	W 113–103	LeBron James (37)	JaVale McGee (11)	LeBron James (8)	Staples Center; 18,997	48–13
62	March 8	@ L. A. Clippers	W 112–103	Anthony Davis (30)	Kyle Kuzma (10)	LeBron James (9)	Staples Center; 19,068	49–13
63	March 10	Brooklyn	L 102–104	LeBron James (29)	LeBron James (12)	LeBron James (9)	Staples Center; 18,997	49–14

Seeding games: 3–5 (home: 2–2; road: 1–3)

Game	Date	Team	Score	High points	High rebounds	High assists	Location Attendance	Record
64	July 30	L. A. Clippers	W 103–101	Anthony Davis (34)	LeBron James (11)	LeBron James (7)	The Arena; No In-Person Attendance	50–14
65	August 1	@ Toronto	L 92–107	LeBron James (20)	LeBron James (10)	LeBron James (5)	The Arena; No In-Person Attendance	50–15
66	August 3	@ Utah	W 116–108	Anthony Davis (42)	Anthony Davis (12)	LeBron James (9)	The Arena; No In-Person Attendance	51–15
67	August 5	Oklahoma City	L 86–105	LeBron James (19)	LeBron James (11)	Anthony Davis (5)	HP Field House; No In-Person Attendance	51–16
68	August 6	@ Houston	L 97–113	Kyle Kuzma (21)	Dwight Howard (15)	Quinn Cook (4)	The Arena; No In-Person Attendance	51–17
69	August 8	@ Indiana	L 111–116	LeBron James (31)	Dwight Howard (12)	LeBron James (7)	HP Field House; No In-Person Attendance	51–18
70	August 10	Denver	W 124–121	LeBron James (29)	Markieff Morris (7)	LeBron James (12)	The Arena; No In-Person Attendance	52–18
71	August 13	Sacramento	L 122–136	Dion Waiters (19)	JaVale McGee (9)	Dudley, Waiters (5)	HP Field House; No In-Person Attendance	52–19

Cancelled games

Game	Date	Team	Score	High points	High rebounds	High assists	Location Attendance	Record
64	March 12	Houston					Staples Center	
65	March 15	Denver					Staples Center	
66	March 16	@ Utah					Vivint Smart Home Arena	
67	March 18	Utah					Staples Center	
68	March 21	@ Charlotte					Spectrum Center	
69	March 22	@ Detroit					Little Caesars Arena	
70	March 24	@ Toronto					Scotiabank Arena	
71	March 26	@ Cleveland					Rocket Mortgage FieldHouse	
72	March 28	@ Washington					Capital One Arena	
73	March 30	@ Minnesota					Target Center	
74	April 1	Indiana					Staples Center	
75	April 4	@ Sacramento					Golden 1 Center	
76	April 5	Oklahoma City					Staples Center	
77	April 7	Golden State					Staples Center	
78	April 8	Chicago					Staples Center	
79	April 9	LA Clippers					Staples Center	
80	April 12	Minnesota					Staples Center	
81	April 14	Sacramento					Staples Center	
82	April 15	@ Phoenix					Talking Stick Resort Arena	

2019–20 season schedule

=== Season notes ===
The Lakers got off to a fast start to the season, amassing a franchise best 17–2 record by the end of November. Four months later, they were able to clinch their first playoff berth since the 2012–13 season with a 113–103 win over the Milwaukee Bucks on March 6, 2020.

Five days after the Lakers clinched their playoff berth, the NBA season was abruptly suspended by league officials after it was reported that Rudy Gobert of the Utah Jazz tested positive for COVID-19. Two unidentified players of the Lakers would later test positive for COVID-19 on March 19. When the season resumed, Avery Bradley declined to play because his oldest child had a history of struggling to recover from respiratory illnesses. The Lakers replaced Bradley on the roster with J. R. Smith, who was James' teammate on the NBA championship-winning 2016 Cleveland Cavaliers.

=== Death of Kobe Bryant ===
On January 26, 2020, tragedy struck the Lakers organization when retired Lakers superstar Kobe Bryant died in a helicopter crash that also claimed the lives of his daughter Gianna "Gigi" Bryant and seven other passengers. Bryant was 41 at the time of his death, and Gigi was 13. Bryant's death prompted the Lakers to dedicate the rest of their season to his memory.

The previous evening on January 25, LeBron James passed Bryant for third place on the NBA's all-time scoring list during a road loss to the Philadelphia 76ers in Bryant's hometown. James would eventually surpass Kareem Abdul-Jabbar to stand alone as the NBA's all-time leading scorer three years later on February 7, 2023. The team learned of Bryant's death while flying back to Los Angeles from Philadelphia one day following their loss to the 76ers, leaving everyone on board the flight in absolute shock and their January 28 meeting with the crosstown rival Los Angeles Clippers would be postponed the following day. This marked the first time an NBA game was postponed for any reason since nearly seven years earlier when the 2013 Boston Marathon bombing led to the postponement of a Celtics game.

"Kobe is a brother to me. From the time I was in high school watching him from afar, to getting in this league at 18 and watching him up close, all the battles that we had throughout my career, the one thing that we always shared was that determination to just want to win, to just want to be great. The fact that I'm here now means so much to me. I want to continue, along with my teammates, his legacy. Not only for this year, but for as long as we can play this game of basketball that we love, because that's what Kobe Bryant would want. So in the words of Kobe Bryant. Mamba out. But in the words of us, not forgotten. Live on, brother."

— LeBron James' tribute to Kobe Bryant prior to the Lakers' first game since the tragedy against the Portland Trail Blazers, five days after his death (January 31, 2020)

The Lakers did not play a game in the wake of Bryant's death until January 31 when they hosted the Portland Trail Blazers on ESPN. Prior to the commencement of the game, the Lakers conducted a 24-minute long, heavily detailed tribute to Bryant, his daughter and the seven other victims. This tribute began with Usher performing "Amazing Grace" and was capped off by a rendition of The Star-Spangled Banner by Boyz II Men before being concluded with a speech from James, who initially had a monologue prepared, but quickly tossed his index card onto the hardwood after saying "Laker Nation man, I would be selling y'all short if I read off this shit, so I'm going to go straight from the heart", as he proceeded to address a sorrowful Staples Center crowd with an emotional, improvised oration, ending his speech with "...so in the words of Kobe Bryant: 'Mamba out', but in the words of us: 'not forgotten', live on brother". Following the eulogy, each member of the Lakers' starting five would be introduced with Bryant's credentials. Portland won 127–119, in what turned out to be the second most watched NBA broadcast ever in ESPN's history, averaging 4.41 million viewers. The first ever head-to-head meeting between Shaquille O'Neal and Yao Ming in 2003 was the only one with more viewers.

Beginning with the January 31 game against Portland, the Lakers added a black logo featuring Bryant's initials to the baseline of their home floor, and a matching commemorative patch to their jerseys. The team also added a number 8 decal to the immediate left of the scorer's table and a number 24 decal to the right of it. The on-court logos remained in place for home games at Staples Center for about six weeks, until the COVID-19 suspension on March 11. The jersey patch continued to be worn for the rest of the season, including through the Orlando bubble with the 2020 NBA playoffs and Finals.

== Playoffs ==
=== Game log ===
2020 playoff game log
Total: 16–5 (Home: 9–3; Road: 7–2)
First Round: 4–1 (home: 2–1; road: 2–0)

Game	Date	Team	Score	High points	High rebounds	High assists	Location Attendance	Series
1	August 18	Portland	L 93–100	Anthony Davis (28)	LeBron James (17)	LeBron James (16)	The Arena; No In-Person Attendance	0–1
2	August 20	Portland	W 111–88	Anthony Davis (31)	Anthony Davis (11)	LeBron James (7)	The Arena; No In-Person Attendance	1–1
3	August 22	@ Portland	W 116–108	LeBron James (38)	LeBron James (12)	Davis, James (8)	AdventHealth Arena; No In-Person Attendance	2–1
4	August 24	@ Portland	W 135–115	LeBron James (30)	Howard, McGee (8)	LeBron James (10)	The Arena; No In-Person Attendance	3–1
5	August 29†	Portland	W 131–122	Anthony Davis (43)	LeBron James (10)	LeBron James (10)	The Arena; No In-Person Attendance	4–1

Conference Semifinals: 4–1 (home: 2–1; road: 2–0)

Game	Date	Team	Score	High points	High rebounds	High assists	Location Attendance	Series
1	September 4	Houston	L 97–112	Anthony Davis (25)	Anthony Davis (14)	LeBron James (7)	The Arena; No In-Person Attendance	0–1
2	September 6	Houston	W 117–109	Anthony Davis (34)	LeBron James (11)	James, Rondo (9)	The Arena; No In-Person Attendance	1–1
3	September 8	@ Houston	W 112–102	LeBron James (36)	Anthony Davis (15)	Rajon Rondo (9)	The Arena; No In-Person Attendance	2–1
4	September 10	@ Houston	W 110–100	Anthony Davis (29)	LeBron James (15)	LeBron James (9)	The Arena; No In-Person Attendance	3–1
5	September 12	Houston	W 119–96	LeBron James (29)	Davis, James (11)	LeBron James (7)	The Arena; No In-Person Attendance	4–1

Conference Finals: 4–1 (home: 3–0; road: 1–1)

Game	Date	Team	Score	High points	High rebounds	High assists	Location Attendance	Series
1	September 18	Denver	W 126–114	Anthony Davis (37)	Anthony Davis (10)	LeBron James (12)	The Arena; No In-Person Attendance	1–0
2	September 20	Denver	W 105–103	Anthony Davis (31)	LeBron James (11)	Rajon Rondo (9)	The Arena; No In-Person Attendance	2–0
3	September 22	@ Denver	L 106–114	LeBron James (30)	LeBron James (10)	LeBron James (11)	The Arena; No In-Person Attendance	2–1
4	September 24	@ Denver	W 114–108	Anthony Davis (34)	Dwight Howard (11)	LeBron James (8)	The Arena; No In-Person Attendance	3–1
5	September 26	Denver	W 117–107	LeBron James (38)	LeBron James (16)	LeBron James (10)	The Arena; No In-Person Attendance	4–1

NBA Finals: 4–2 (home: 2–1; road: 2–1)

Game	Date	Team	Score	High points	High rebounds	High assists	Location Attendance	Series
1	September 30	Miami	W 116–98	Anthony Davis (34)	LeBron James (13)	LeBron James (9)	The Arena; No In-Person Attendance	1–0
2	October 2	Miami	W 124–114	LeBron James (33)	Anthony Davis (14)	Rajon Rondo (10)	The Arena; No In-Person Attendance	2–0
3	October 4	@ Miami	L 104–115	LeBron James (25)	LeBron James (10)	LeBron James (8)	The Arena; No In-Person Attendance	2–1
4	October 6	@ Miami	W 102–96	LeBron James (28)	LeBron James (12)	LeBron James (8)	The Arena; No In-Person Attendance	3–1
5	October 9	Miami	L 108–111	LeBron James (40)	LeBron James (13)	LeBron James (7)	The Arena; No In-Person Attendance	3–2
6	October 11	@ Miami	W 106–93	LeBron James (28)	Anthony Davis (15)	LeBron James (10)	The Arena; No In-Person Attendance	4–2

2020 playoff schedule

† Originally scheduled for August 26. Game 5 was rescheduled due to a boycott from NBA players after a police officer shot Jacob Blake.

=== Playoff notes ===
In the NBA playoffs, the Lakers faced off against the eight-seed Portland Trail Blazers in the first round and won the series in five games. In the Western Conference Semifinals, they faced the fourth-seeded Houston Rockets, again winning in five games. The Lakers advanced to the Western Conference Finals for the first time since 2010, where they defeated the Denver Nuggets in five games.

The Lakers reached the NBA Finals for the first time in a decade. In the Finals, the Lakers competed against the Eastern Conference champion Miami Heat; this was the first time that the two teams had met in the NBA Finals. The Lakers won the series in six games, winning the championship for the first time since the 2010 season. They became the first team since the 2007–08 Boston Celtics to miss the playoffs one season and win a championship the following season. The Lakers also tied the Celtics for the highest-ever number of NBA championship wins with 17. The Lakers' LeBron James was named the NBA Finals Most Valuable Player (MVP) for the fourth time in his career. He became the first player in league history to be named Finals MVP with three different franchises (twice with the Heat, once with the Cleveland Cavaliers, and once with the Lakers). James and Danny Green became the third and fourth players, respectively, to win NBA championships with three different teams. Lakers president Jeanie Buss became the first female controlling owner to guide her team to an NBA title.

== Roster ==
2019–20 Los Angeles Lakers roster
Players

Pos.	No.	Player	Height	Weight	DOB	From
F	37	Kostas Antetokounmpo (TW)	6 ft 10 in (2.08 m)	200 lb (91 kg)	1997–11–20	Dayton
G	11	Avery Bradley	6 ft 3 in (1.91 m)	180 lb (82 kg)	1990–11–26	Texas
F	12	Devontae Cacok (TW)	6 ft 8 in (2.03 m)	240 lb (109 kg)	1996–10–08	UNC Wilmington
G	1	Kentavious Caldwell-Pope	6 ft 5 in (1.96 m)	204 lb (93 kg)	1993–02–18	Georgia
G	4	Alex Caruso	6 ft 5 in (1.96 m)	186 lb (84 kg)	1994–02–28	Texas A&M
G	28	Quinn Cook	6 ft 1 in (1.85 m)	180 lb (82 kg)	1993–03–23	Duke
F/C	3	Anthony Davis	6 ft 10 in (2.08 m)	253 lb (115 kg)	1993–03–11	Kentucky
F	10	Jared Dudley	6 ft 7 in (2.01 m)	237 lb (108 kg)	1985–07–10	Boston College
G/F	14	Danny Green	6 ft 6 in (1.98 m)	215 lb (98 kg)	1987–06–22	North Carolina
G	5	Talen Horton-Tucker	6 ft 4 in (1.93 m)	234 lb (106 kg)	2000–11–25	Iowa State
C	39	Dwight Howard	6 ft 11 in (2.11 m)	265 lb (120 kg)	1985–12–08	SW Atlanta Academy (GA)
F	23	LeBron James	6 ft 9 in (2.06 m)	250 lb (113 kg)	1984–12–30	St. Vincent–St. Mary HS (OH)
F	0	Kyle Kuzma	6 ft 9 in (2.06 m)	221 lb (100 kg)	1995–07–24	Utah
C	7	JaVale McGee	7 ft 0 in (2.13 m)	270 lb (122 kg)	1988–01–19	Nevada
F	88	Markieff Morris	6 ft 10 in (2.08 m)	245 lb (111 kg)	1989–09–02	Kansas
G	9	Rajon Rondo	6 ft 1 in (1.85 m)	180 lb (82 kg)	1986–02–22	Kentucky
G	21	J. R. Smith	6 ft 6 in (1.98 m)	225 lb (102 kg)	1985–09–09	Saint Benedict's Prep (NJ)
G	18	Dion Waiters	6 ft 3 in (1.91 m)	210 lb (95 kg)	1991–12–10	Syracuse

Coaches
Head coach
- Frank Vogel
Assistant(s)
- Quinton Crawford
- Phil Handy
- Lionel Hollins
- Jason Kidd
- Mike Penberthy
- Miles Simon

Legend
- (DP) Unsigned draft pick
- (FA) Free agent
- (S) Suspended
- (GL) On assignment to G League affiliate
- (TW) Two-way affiliate player
- (L) On leave from the team
- Injured

Roster
Updated: 2020–07–13

== Player statistics ==
Legend
GP	Games played	GS	Games started	MPG	Minutes per game
FG%	Field-goal percentage	3P%	3-point field-goal percentage	FT%	Free-throw percentage
RPG	Rebounds per game	APG	Assists per game	SPG	Steals per game
BPG	Blocks per game	PPG	Points per game

=== Regular season ===
Los Angeles Lakers statistics
Player	GP	GS	MPG	FG%	3P%	FT%	RPG	APG	SPG	BPG	PPG
Kentavious Caldwell-Pope	69	26	25.5	.467	.385	.775	2.1	1.6	.8	.2	9.3
Dwight Howard	69	2	18.9	.729	.600	.514	7.3	.7	.4	1.1	7.5
Danny Green	68	68	24.8	.416	.367	.688	3.3	1.3	1.3	.5	8.0
JaVale McGee	68	68	16.6	.637	.500	.646	5.7	.5	.5	1.4	6.6
LeBron James	67	67	34.6	.493	.348	.693	7.8	10.2	1.2	.5	25.3
Alex Caruso	64	2	18.4	.412	.333	.734	1.9	1.9	1.1	.3	5.5
Anthony Davis	62	62	34.4	.503	.330	.846	9.3	3.2	1.5	2.3	26.1
Kyle Kuzma	61	9	25.0	.436	.316	.735	4.5	1.3	.5	.4	12.8
Avery Bradley	49	44	24.2	.444	.364	.833	2.3	1.3	.9	.1	8.6
Rajon Rondo	48	3	20.5	.418	.328	.659	3.0	5.0	.8	.0	7.1
Jared Dudley	45	1	8.1	.400	.429	1.000	1.2	.6	.3	.1	1.5
Quinn Cook	44	1	11.5	.425	.365	.786	1.2	1.1	.3	.0	5.1
Troy Daniels^{†}	41	0	11.1	.392	.357	.625	1.1	.3	.2	.1	4.2
Markieff Morris^{†}	14	1	14.2	.406	.333	.833	3.2	.6	.4	.4	5.3
Dion Waiters^{†}	7	0	23.6	.425	.233	.875	1.9	2.4	.6	.6	11.9
Talen Horton-Tucker	6	1	13.5	.467	.308	.500	1.2	1.0	1.3	.2	5.7
J. R. Smith	6	0	13.2	.318	.091	1.000	.8	.5	.2	.0	2.8
Kostas Antetokounmpo	5	0	4.0	1.000		.500	.6	.4	.0	.0	1.4
Zach Norvell Jr.^{†}	2	0	2.5	.000			.5	.0	.0	.0	.0
Devontae Cacok	1	0	9.0	.500			5.0	1.0	.0	.0	6.0

=== Playoffs ===
Los Angeles Lakers statistics
Player	GP	GS	MPG	FG%	3P%	FT%	RPG	APG	SPG	BPG	PPG
Anthony Davis	21	21	36.6	.571	.383	.832	9.7	3.5	1.2	1.4	27.7
LeBron James	21	21	36.3	.560	.370	.720	10.8	8.8	1.2	.9	27.6
Kentavious Caldwell-Pope	21	21	29.0	.418	.378	.815	2.1	1.3	1.0	.2	10.7
Danny Green	21	21	25.0	.347	.339	.667	3.1	1.2	1.0	.8	8.0
Markieff Morris	21	2	18.3	.449	.420	.778	3.0	1.0	.3	.1	5.9
Alex Caruso	21	1	24.3	.425	.279	.800	2.3	2.8	1.1	.6	6.5
Kyle Kuzma	21	0	23.0	.430	.313	.784	3.1	.8	.3	.3	10.0
Dwight Howard	18	7	15.7	.684	.500	.556	4.6	.5	.4	.4	5.8
Rajon Rondo	16	0	24.7	.455	.400	.684	4.3	6.6	1.4	.1	8.9
JaVale McGee	14	11	9.6	.625	.000	.500	3.1	.5	.1	.7	2.9
J. R. Smith	10	0	7.5	.269	.273		.3	.3	.2	.0	2.0
Jared Dudley	9	0	3.4	.000	.000		.2	.0	.4	.1	.0
Quinn Cook	6	0	4.0	.500	.500	1.000	.2	.8	.0	.0	2.2
Dion Waiters	5	0	7.6	.333	.000	1.000	.4	.4	.2	.2	2.0
Talen Horton-Tucker	2	0	8.5	.500	.400		2.5	.0	1.0	.0	7.0

- ^{†} Denotes player spent time with another team in the season. Stats reflect time with the Lakers only.

== Transactions ==
=== Overview ===
Players Added

Trade

- Anthony Davis

Free agency

- Troy Daniels
- Jared Dudley
- Quinn Cook
- DeMarcus Cousins (never played for the team due to injury)
- Danny Green
- Avery Bradley
- Talen Horton-Tucker
- Dwight Howard
- Markieff Morris
- Dion Waiters
- J.R. Smith

Two-way contract

- Zach Norvell Jr.
- Kostas Antetokounmpo
- Devontae Cacok
Players Lost

Trade

- Lonzo Ball
- Brandon Ingram
- Josh Hart
- Isaac Bonga
- Jemerrio Jones
- Moritz Wagner

Free agency

- Mike Muscala
- Reggie Bullock
- Tyson Chandler
- Lance Stephenson
- Zach Norvell Jr.

Waived

- DeMarcus Cousins
- Troy Daniels

=== Trades ===
Three-team trade	
To Los Angeles Lakers: Anthony Davis (from New Orleans)	To New Orleans Pelicans: Lonzo Ball (from LA Lakers); Josh Hart (from LA Lakers); Brandon Ingram (from LA Lakers); Draft rights to De'Andre Hunter (#4) (from LA Lakers); 2021 LAL protected first-round pick (Note: New Orleans will receive the pick if it's #1–7, else they will receive the Lakers' 2022 pick.) (from LA Lakers); Right to swap first-round picks in 2023 (from LA Lakers); 2024 LAL first-round pick (Note: New Orleans may choose to take the Lakers' 2025 first-round pick instead.) (from LA Lakers); Cash considerations (from LA Lakers); Cash considerations (from Washington)
To Washington Wizards: Isaac Bonga (from LA Lakers); Jemerrio Jones (from LA Lakers); Moritz Wagner (from LA Lakers); 2022 second-round pick (Note: Washington will receive the best of the picks originally belonging to Chicago, Detroit, and the Lakers.) (from LA Lakers)

=== Free agency ===
==== Re-signed ====
Player	Signed
Kentavious Caldwell-Pope	2-year contract worth $16.5 million
JaVale McGee	2-year contract worth $8.2 million
Alex Caruso	2-year contract worth $5.5 million
Rajon Rondo	2-year contract worth $5.1 million

==== Additions ====
Player	Signed	Former Team
Zach Norvell Jr.	Two-way contract	Gonzaga Bulldogs
Troy Daniels	1-year contract worth $2 million	Phoenix Suns
Jared Dudley	1-year contract worth $2.5 million	Brooklyn Nets
Quinn Cook	2-year contract worth $6 million	Golden State Warriors
DeMarcus Cousins	1-year contract worth $3.5 million	Golden State Warriors
Danny Green	2-year contract worth $30 million	Toronto Raptors
Avery Bradley	2-year contract worth $9.7 million	Memphis Grizzlies
Talen Horton-Tucker	2-year contract worth $2.4 million	Iowa State Cyclones
Kostas Antetokounmpo	Two-way contract	Dallas Mavericks
Dwight Howard	1-year contract worth $2.6 million	Memphis Grizzlies
Devontae Cacok	Two-way contract	South Bay Lakers
Markieff Morris	1-year contract worth $1.7 million	Detroit Pistons
Dion Waiters	1-year contract worth $503,656	Memphis Grizzlies
J.R. Smith	Season Restart contract, worth unknown	Cleveland Cavaliers

==== Subtractions ====
Player	Reason left	New Team
Mike Muscala	1-year contract worth $1.6 million	Oklahoma City Thunder
Reggie Bullock	2-year contract worth $8.2 million	New York Knicks
Tyson Chandler	1-year contract worth $2.5 million	Houston Rockets
Zach Norvell Jr.	10-day contract worth $50,752	Golden State Warriors
DeMarcus Cousins	Waived	Houston Rockets
Troy Daniels	Waived	Denver Nuggets
