= 2019–20 Golden State Warriors season =

NBA professional basketball team season

- Head coach: Steve Kerr
- General manager: Bob Myers
- Owners: Joe Lacob; Peter Guber
- Arena: Chase Center

Results
- Record: 15–50 (.231)
- Place: Division: 5th (Pacific); Conference: 15th (Western)
- Playoff finish: Did not qualify
- Stats at Basketball Reference

Local media
- Television: NBC Sports Bay Area
- Radio: 95.7 The Game

The 2019–20 Golden State Warriors season was the 74th season of the franchise in the National Basketball Association (NBA), and its 58th in the San Francisco Bay Area. The Warriors entered the season as the five-time defending Western Conference champion and runners-up in the 2019 NBA Finals, where they lost to the Toronto Raptors in six games. The Warriors moved from the Oracle Arena (now Oakland Arena) in Oakland to the new Chase Center in San Francisco before the start of the season, the first time the team had played in the city since the 1970–71 season.

This season saw the departures of Kevin Durant and Andre Iguodala, and thus the break up of the Hamptons Five. After considering signing with teams such as the New York Knicks and Los Angeles Clippers, Durant left in a sign-and-trade with the Brooklyn Nets, with the Golden State Warriors acquiring All-Star guard D'Angelo Russell as part of the deal. Iguodala was traded to the Memphis Grizzlies after six seasons with the Warriors, in which he won three championships and a Finals MVP. Russell would then be traded to the Minnesota Timberwolves for former #1 pick Andrew Wiggins at the trade deadline in February 2020.

Despite lofty expectations, the Warriors got off to a 4–16 start, their worst since the 2000 season. Injuries were a major reason for the poor start. All-Star SG Klay Thompson missed the entire regular season with an ACL tear he suffered during Game 6 of the 2019 NBA Finals. Stephen Curry was injured on October 30, 2019, which required surgery to repair his broken second metacarpal. Curry played in just five of the Warriors' 65 games. Despite the injuries, the Warriors' had a bright spot in second-round draft pick Eric Paschall who was named to the NBA All-Rookie First Team in 2020.

In response to mounting concerns over the COVID-19 pandemic by public health officials, the season was suspended by the league officials following the games of March 11, 2020. On June 4, 2020, it was announced that the NBA Board of Governors had approved a plan in which 22 teams would resume the season behind closed doors; the plan was approved by the National Basketball Players Association (NBPA) the following day. The Warriors, with the league's overall worst record (15–50) at the time of the season's suspension, were not among the 22 teams selected. The 2019–20 season was the first season in franchise history in which the Warriors had the worst record in the league.

== Draft ==
Round	Pick	Player	Position	Nationality	School / club team
1	28	Jordan Poole	Shooting Guard	United States	Michigan (So.)
2	41	Eric Paschall	Power Forward	United States	Villanova (Sr.)
2	58	Miye Oni	Shooting Guard	Nigeria	Yale (Jr.)

The Warriors held one first-round pick and two second-round draft picks entering the draft. The 58th pick was traded to the Utah Jazz for cash considerations.

== Standings ==
=== Division ===
Pacific Division	W	L	PCT	GB	Home	Road	Div	GP
c – Los Angeles Lakers	52	19	.732	–	25‍–‍10	27‍–‍9	10–3	71
x – Los Angeles Clippers	49	23	.681	3.5	27‍–‍9	22‍–‍14	8–6	72
Phoenix Suns	34	39	.466	19.0	17‍–‍22	17‍–‍17	6–9	73
Sacramento Kings	31	41	.431	21.5	16‍–‍19	15‍–‍22	8–5	72
Golden State Warriors	15	50	.231	34.0	8‍–‍26	7‍–‍24	2–11	65

=== Conference ===
Western Conference
#	Team	W	L	PCT	GB	GP
1	c – Los Angeles Lakers *	52	19	.732	–	71
2	x – Los Angeles Clippers	49	23	.681	3.5	72
3	y – Denver Nuggets *	46	27	.630	7.0	73
4	y – Houston Rockets *	44	28	.611	8.5	72
5	x – Oklahoma City Thunder	44	28	.611	8.5	72
6	x – Utah Jazz	44	28	.611	8.5	72
7	x – Dallas Mavericks	43	32	.573	11.0	75
8	x – Portland Trail Blazers	35	39	.473	18.5	74
9	pi – Memphis Grizzlies	34	39	.466	19.0	73
10	Phoenix Suns	34	39	.466	19.0	73
11	San Antonio Spurs	32	39	.451	20.0	71
12	Sacramento Kings	31	41	.431	21.5	72
13	New Orleans Pelicans	30	42	.417	22.5	72
14	Minnesota Timberwolves	19	45	.297	29.5	64
15	Golden State Warriors	15	50	.231	34.0	65

== Game log ==
=== Regular season ===
2019–20 game log
Total: 15–50 (Home: 8–26; Road: 7–24)
October: 1–3 (home: 0–2; road: 1–1)

Game	Date	Team	Score	High points	High rebounds	High assists	Location Attendance	Record
1	October 24	L. A. Clippers	L 122–141	Stephen Curry (23)	Kevon Looney (9)	D'Angelo Russell (8)	Chase Center; 18,064	0–1
2	October 27	@ Oklahoma City	L 92–120	Stephen Curry (23)	Curry, Spellman (8)	Stephen Curry (5)	Chesapeake Energy Arena; 18,203	0–2
3	October 28	@ New Orleans	W 134–123	Stephen Curry (26)	Draymond Green (17)	Stephen Curry (11)	Smoothie King Center; 17,307	1–2
4	October 30	Phoenix	L 110–121	Eric Paschall (20)	Green, Russell, Spellman (6)	Stephen Curry (6)	Chase Center; 18,064	1–3

November: 3–13 (home: 2–5; road: 1–8)

Game	Date	Team	Score	High points	High rebounds	High assists	Location Attendance	Record
5	November 1	San Antonio	L 110–127	D'Angelo Russell (30)	Marquese Chriss (9)	D'Angelo Russell (8)	Chase Center; 18,064	1–4
6	November 2	Charlotte	L 87–93	Eric Paschall (25)	Cauley-Stein, Robinson III (8)	Ky Bowman (4)	Chase Center; 18,064	1–5
7	November 4	Portland	W 127–118	Eric Paschall (34)	Eric Paschall (13)	Ky Bowman (8)	Chase Center; 18,064	2–5
8	November 6	@ Houston	L 112–129	Alec Burks (28)	Glenn Robinson III (11)	Ky Bowman (4)	Toyota Center; 18,055	2–6
9	November 8	@ Minnesota	L 119–125 (OT)	D'Angelo Russell (52)	Burks, Russell (9)	D'Angelo Russell (5)	Target Center; 15,647	2–7
10	November 9	@ Oklahoma City	L 108–114	D'Angelo Russell (30)	Damion Lee (7)	D'Angelo Russell (7)	Chesapeake Energy Arena; 18,203	2–8
11	November 11	Utah	L 108–122	D'Angelo Russell (33)	Willie Cauley-Stein (11)	D'Angelo Russell (8)	Chase Center; 18,064	2–9
12	November 13	@ L. A. Lakers	L 94–120	D'Angelo Russell (21)	Omari Spellman (7)	D'Angelo Russell (8)	Staples Center; 18,997	2–10
13	November 15	Boston	L 100–105	Alec Burks (20)	Draymond Green (11)	D'Angelo Russell (7)	Chase Center; 18,064	2–11
14	November 17	@ New Orleans	L 100–108	Eric Paschall (30)	Chriss, Paschall (7)	Alec Burks (5)	Smoothie King Center; 16,812	2–12
15	November 19	@ Memphis	W 114–95	Alec Burks (29)	Cauley-Stein, Green (10)	Draymond Green (11)	FedExForum; 14,511	3–12
16	November 20	@ Dallas	L 94–142	Eric Paschall (22)	Eric Paschall (7)	Jordan Poole (7)	American Airlines Center; 19,569	3–13
17	November 22	@ Utah	L 109–113	Alec Burks (20)	Eric Paschall (7)	Bowman, Paschall, Robinson III (5)	Vivint Smart Home Arena; 18,306	3–14
18	November 25	Oklahoma City	L 97–100	Glenn Robinson III (25)	Eric Paschall (10)	Marquese Chriss (7)	Chase Center; 18,064	3–15
19	November 27	Chicago	W 104–90	Eric Paschall (25)	Omari Spellman (11)	Draymond Green (8)	Chase Center; 18,064	4–15
20	November 29	@ Miami	L 105–122	Jordan Poole (20)	Ky Bowman (7)	Bowman, Chriss (6)	American Airlines Arena; 19,600	4–16

December: 5–10 (home: 4–4; road: 1–6)

Game	Date	Team	Score	High points	High rebounds	High assists	Location Attendance	Record
21	December 1	@ Orlando	L 96–100	Glenn Robinson III (19)	Willie Cauley-Stein (12)	Draymond Green (7)	Amway Center; 15,052	4–17
22	December 2	@ Atlanta	L 79–104	Eric Paschall (24)	Paschall, Spellman (9)	Eric Paschall (6)	State Farm Arena; 14,278	4–18
23	December 4	@ Charlotte	L 91–106	D'Angelo Russell (18)	Willie Cauley-Stein (7)	Draymond Green (6)	Spectrum Center; 14,355	4–19
24	December 6	@ Chicago	W 100–98	Glenn Robinson III (20)	Cauley-Stein, Robinson III, Russell (7)	Ky Bowman (6)	United Center; 18,841	5–19
25	December 9	Memphis	L 102–110	Burks, Russell (18)	Cauley-Stein, Robinson III (8)	D'Angelo Russell (7)	Chase Center; 18,064	5–20
26	December 11	New York	L 122–124 (OT)	D'Angelo Russell (32)	Chriss, Green (10)	Draymond Green (12)	Chase Center; 18,064	5–21
27	December 13	@ Utah	L 106–114	Alec Burks (24)	Marquese Chriss (13)	Marquese Chriss (5)	Vivint Smart Home Arena; 18,306	5–22
28	December 15	Sacramento	L 79–100	Willie Cauley-Stein (14)	Marquese Chriss (6)	D'Angelo Russell (8)	Chase Center; 18,064	5–23
29	December 18	@ Portland	L 112–122	D'Angelo Russell (26)	Marquese Chriss (10)	D'Angelo Russell (7)	Moda Center; 19,393	5–24
30	December 20	New Orleans	W 106–102	D'Angelo Russell (25)	Alec Burks (8)	Draymond Green (8)	Chase Center; 18,064	6–24
31	December 23	Minnesota	W 113–104	D'Angelo Russell (30)	Draymond Green (14)	Alec Burks (8)	Chase Center; 18,064	7–24
32	December 25	Houston	W 116–104	Damion Lee (22)	Damion Lee (15)	Ky Bowman (6)	Chase Center; 18,064	8–24
33	December 27	Phoenix	W 105–96	D'Angelo Russell (31)	Damion Lee (8)	D'Angelo Russell (6)	Chase Center; 18,064	9–24
34	December 28	Dallas	L 121–141	D'Angelo Russell (35)	Damion Lee (12)	Draymond Green (8)	Chase Center; 18,064	9–25
35	December 31	@ San Antonio	L 113–117 (OT)	Alec Burks (28)	Marquese Chriss (11)	Draymond Green (9)	AT&T Center; 18,354	9–26

January: 1–13 (home: 1–6; road: 0–7)

Game	Date	Team	Score	High points	High rebounds	High assists	Location Attendance	Record
36	January 2	@ Minnesota	L 84–99	Glenn Robinson III (16)	Paschall, Chriss (7)	Draymond Green (6)	Target Center; 15,477	9–27
37	January 4	Detroit	L 104–111	Alec Burks (27)	Alec Burks (7)	Alec Burks (5)	Chase Center; 18,064	9–28
38	January 6	@ Sacramento	L 98–111	Glenn Robinson III (16)	Willie Cauley-Stein (9)	Willie Cauley-Stein (5)	Golden 1 Center; 15,819	9–29
39	January 8	Milwaukee	L 98–107	Alec Burks (19)	Willie Cauley-Stein (11)	Draymond Green (8)	Chase Center; 18,064	9–30
40	January 10	@ L. A. Clippers	L 100–109	Robinson III, Spellman (17)	Alec Burks (8)	Burks, Lee (5)	Staples Center; 19,068	9–31
41	January 12	@ Memphis	L 102–122	D'Angelo Russell (34)	Draymond Green (8)	Eric Paschall (5)	FedExForum; 16,408	9–32
42	January 14	Dallas	L 97–124	Jacob Evans (17)	Glenn Robinson III (7)	D'Angelo Russell (8)	Chase Center; 18,064	9–33
43	January 16	Denver	L 131–134 (OT)	Alec Burks (25)	Draymond Green (8)	D'Angelo Russell (9)	Chase Center; 18,064	9–34
44	January 18	Orlando	W 109–95	D'Angelo Russell (26)	Eric Paschall (9)	D'Angelo Russell (12)	Chase Center; 18,064	10–34
45	January 20	@ Portland	L 124–129 (OT)	Alec Burks (33)	Eric Paschall (13)	D'Angelo Russell (9)	Moda Center; 19,493	10–35
46	January 22	Utah	L 96–129	D'Angelo Russell (26)	Marquese Chriss (8)	Damion Lee (4)	Chase Center; 18,064	10–36
47	January 24	Indiana	L 118–129	D'Angelo Russell (37)	Paschall, Robinson III (7)	Draymond Green (11)	Chase Center; 18,064	10–37
48	January 28	@ Philadelphia	L 104–115	D'Angelo Russell (28)	Draymond Green (9)	Draymond Green (12)	Wells Fargo Center; 20,854	10–38
49	January 30	@ Boston	L 104–119	D'Angelo Russell (22)	Damion Lee (7)	Draymond Green (7)	TD Garden; 19,156	10–39

February: 3–8 (home: 0–6; road: 3–2)

Game	Date	Team	Score	High points	High rebounds	High assists	Location Attendance	Record
50	February 1	@ Cleveland	W 131–112	Glenn Robinson III (22)	Chriss, Green, Russell (7)	Draymond Green (16)	Rocket Mortgage FieldHouse; 18,410	11–39
51	February 3	@ Washington	W 125–117	Alec Burks (30)	Green, Paschall (10)	Green, Robinson III (7)	Capital One Arena; 17,120	12–39
52	February 5	@ Brooklyn	L 88–129	D'Angelo Russell (17)	Marquese Chriss (7)	Evans, Poole (4)	Barclays Center; 14,352	12–40
53	February 8	L. A. Lakers	L 120–125	Marquese Chriss (26)	Marquese Chriss (9)	Ky Bowman (11)	Chase Center; 18,064	12–41
54	February 10	Miami	L 101–113	Damion Lee (26)	Chriss, Green (9)	Draymond Green (9)	Chase Center; 18,064	12–42
55	February 12	@ Phoenix	L 106–112	Andrew Wiggins (27)	Marquese Chriss (12)	Draymond Green (9)	Talking Stick Resort Arena; 15,216	12–43
56	February 20	Houston	L 105–135	Andrew Wiggins (22)	Paschall, Toscano-Anderson (7)	Draymond Green (7)	Chase Center; 18,064	12–44
57	February 23	New Orleans	L 101–115	Damion Lee (22)	Andrew Wiggins (9)	Ky Bowman (7)	Chase Center; 18,064	12–45
58	February 25	Sacramento	L 94–112	Marquese Chriss (21)	Marquese Chriss (10)	Lee, Poole (4)	Chase Center; 18,064	12–46
59	February 27	L. A. Lakers	L 86–116	Eric Paschall (23)	Marquese Chriss (7)	Jordan Poole (8)	Chase Center; 18,064	12–47
60	February 29	@ Phoenix	W 115–99	Eric Paschall (25)	Bender, Chriss (9)	Damion Lee (8)	Talking Stick Resort Arena; 16,395	13–47

March: 2–3 (home: 1–3; road: 1–0)

Game	Date	Team	Score	High points	High rebounds	High assists	Location Attendance	Record
61	March 1	Washington	L 110–124	Andrew Wiggins (27)	Marquese Chriss (13)	Jordan Poole (7)	Chase Center; 18,064	13–48
62	March 3	@ Denver	W 116–100	Paschall, Wiggins (22)	5 tied (5)	Andrew Wiggins (10)	Pepsi Center; 19,520	14–48
63	March 5	Toronto	L 113–121	Curry, Lee (23)	Marquese Chriss (12)	Eric Paschall (8)	Chase Center; 18,064	14–49
64	March 7	Philadelphia	W 118–114	Damion Lee (24)	Marquese Chriss (10)	Marquese Chriss (8)	Chase Center; 18,064	15–49
65	March 10	L. A. Clippers	L 107–131	Dragan Bender (23)	Marquese Chriss (10)	Eric Paschall (7)	Chase Center; 18,064	15–50

Cancelled games

Game	Date	Team	Score	High points	High rebounds	High assists	Location Attendance	Record
66	March 12	Brooklyn					Chase Center	
67	March 14	@ Milwaukee					Fiserv Forum	
68	March 16	@ Toronto					Scotiabank Arena	
69	March 18	@ Indiana					Bankers Life Fieldhouse	
70	March 20	@ Detroit					Little Caesars Arena	
71	March 21	@ New York					Madison Square Garden	
72	March 25	Atlanta					Chase Center	
73	March 28	Oklahoma City					Chase Center	
74	March 29	San Antonio					Chase Center	
75	March 31	Denver					Chase Center	
76	April 2	@ Houston					Toyota Center	
77	April 3	@ San Antonio					AT&T Center	
78	April 7	@ LA Lakers					Staples Center	
79	April 8	Cleveland					Chase Center	
80	April 11	@ LA Clippers					Staples Center	
81	April 13	Portland					Chase Center	
82	April 15	@ Sacramento					Golden 1 Center	

2019–20 season schedule

== Roster ==
2019–20 Golden State Warriors roster
Players

Pos.	No.	Player	Height	Weight	DOB	From
G	12	Ky Bowman	6 ft 1 in (1.85 m)	187 lb (85 kg)	1997–06–17	Boston College
F	32	Marquese Chriss	6 ft 9 in (2.06 m)	240 lb (109 kg)	1997–07–02	Washington
G	30	Stephen Curry (C)	6 ft 3 in (1.91 m)	185 lb (84 kg)	1988–03–14	Davidson
F	23	Draymond Green (C)	6 ft 7 in (2.01 m)	230 lb (104 kg)	1990–03–04	Michigan State
G/F	1	Damion Lee	6 ft 5 in (1.96 m)	210 lb (95 kg)	1992–10–21	Louisville
C	5	Kevon Looney	6 ft 9 in (2.06 m)	222 lb (101 kg)	1996–02–06	UCLA
G	15	Mychal Mulder	6 ft 3 in (1.91 m)	184 lb (83 kg)	1994–06–14	Kentucky
F	7	Eric Paschall	6 ft 6 in (1.98 m)	255 lb (116 kg)	1996–11–04	Villanova
G	3	Jordan Poole	6 ft 4 in (1.93 m)	194 lb (88 kg)	1999–06–19	Michigan
C	6	Alen Smailagić	6 ft 10 in (2.08 m)	215 lb (98 kg)	2000–08–18	Serbia
G	11	Klay Thompson (C)	6 ft 7 in (2.01 m)	215 lb (98 kg)	1990–02–08	Washington State
F	95	Juan Toscano-Anderson	6 ft 6 in (1.98 m)	209 lb (95 kg)	1993–04–10	Marquette
F	22	Andrew Wiggins	6 ft 8 in (2.03 m)	197 lb (89 kg)	1995–02–23	Kansas

Coaches
Head coach
- Steve Kerr
Assistant(s)
- Ron Adams
- Mike Brown
- Jarron Collins
- Bruce Fraser

Legend
- (DP) Unsigned draft pick
- (FA) Free agent
- (S) Suspended
- (GL) On assignment to G League affiliate
- (TW) Two-way affiliate player
- Injured

Roster
Updated: 2020–02–27

== Player statistics ==
Legend
GP	Games played	GS	Games started	MPG	Minutes per game
FG%	Field-goal percentage	3P%	3-point field-goal percentage	FT%	Free-throw percentage
RPG	Rebounds per game	APG	Assists per game	SPG	Steals per game
BPG	Blocks per game	PPG	Points per game

=== Regular season ===
Golden State Warriors statistics
Player	GP	GS	MPG	FG%	3P%	FT%	RPG	APG	SPG	BPG	PPG
Stephen Curry	5	5	27.8	.402	.245	1.000	5.2	6.6	1.0	.4	20.8
Eric Paschall	60	26	27.6	.497	.287	.774	4.6	2.1	.5	.2	14.0
Damion Lee	49	36	29.0	.417	.356	.873	4.9	2.7	1.0	.1	12.7
Marquese Chriss	59	21	20.3	.545	.205	.769	6.2	1.9	.7	1.1	9.3
Jordan Poole	57	14	22.4	.333	.279	.798	2.1	2.4	.6	.2	8.8
Draymond Green	43	43	28.4	.389	.279	.759	6.2	6.2	1.4	.8	8.0
Ky Bowman	45	12	22.6	.417	.308	.829	2.7	2.9	1.0	.2	7.4
Alen Smailagić	14	0	9.9	.500	.231	.842	1.9	.9	.2	.3	4.2
Kevon Looney	20	4	13.1	.367	.071	.750	3.3	1.0	.6	.3	3.4
Andrew Wiggins ^{≠}	12	12	33.6	.457	.339	.672	4.6	3.6	1.3	1.4	19.4
Mychal Mulder ^{≠}	7	3	29.1	.388	.308	.750	3.3	1.1	.3	.1	11.0
Dragan Bender ^{≠}	9	3	21.7	.437	.324	.727	5.9	2.1	.4	.4	9.0
Jeremy Pargo ^{≠}	3	0	14.7	.500	.429	.000	1.0	2.7	.3	.0	8.3
Juan Toscano-Anderson ^{≠}	13	6	20.9	.460	.348	.600	4.0	2.0	1.0	.4	5.3
Zach Norvell Jr. ^{≠}	3	0	12.0	.273	.375	1.000	1.7	1.0	.7	.0	3.3
Chasson Randle ^{≠}	3	0	13.3	.000	.000	.833	.7	1.7	.7	.0	1.7
D'Angelo Russell ^{†}	33	33	32.1	.430	.374	.785	3.7	6.2	.9	.3	23.6
Alec Burks ^{†}	48	18	29.0	.406	.375	.897	4.7	3.1	1.0	.4	16.1
Glenn Robinson III ^{†}	48	48	31.6	.481	.400	.851	4.7	1.8	.9	.3	12.9
Willie Cauley-Stein ^{†}	41	37	23.0	.560	—	.614	6.2	1.5	1.1	1.2	7.9
Omari Spellman ^{†}	49	3	18.1	.431	.391	.793	4.5	1.0	.7	.5	7.6
Jacob Evans ^{†}	27	1	15.3	.338	.342	.862	1.5	1.1	.4	.4	4.7

After all games.
^{‡} Waived during the season
^{†} Traded during the season
^{≠} Acquired during the season

== Transactions ==
=== Trades ===
July 7, 2019	To Golden State Warriors • (United States) Julian Washburn	To Memphis Grizzlies • (United States) Andre Iguodala • 2024 protected first-round pick • Cash considerations
July 7, 2019	To Golden State Warriors • (United States) D'Angelo Russell (sign and trade) • (United States) Shabazz Napier • (United States) Treveon Graham	To Brooklyn Nets • (United States) Kevin Durant (sign and trade) • 2020 protected first-round pick
July 8, 2019	To Golden State Warriors • Draft rights to (Israel) Lior Eliyahu (2006 No. 44)	To Minnesota Timberwolves • (United States) Treveon Graham • (United States) Shabazz Napier • Cash considerations
July 8, 2019	To Golden State Warriors • (United States) Omari Spellman	To Atlanta Hawks • (United States) Damian Jones • 2026 second-round pick
January 25, 2020	To Golden State Warriors • 2020 UTA second-round pick	To Dallas Mavericks • (United States) Willie Cauley-Stein
February 6, 2020	To Golden State Warriors • (Canada) Andrew Wiggins • 2021 MIN protected first-round pick (Note: Golden State will receive the pick if it's #4-30, else they will receive Minnesota's first-round pick in 2022) • 2021 MIN second-round pick	To Minnesota Timberwolves • (United States) D'Angelo Russell • (United States) Omari Spellman • (United States) Jacob Evans
February 6, 2020	To Golden State Warriors • 2020 DAL second-round pick • 2021 DEN second-round pick • 2022 TOR second-round pick	To Philadelphia 76ers • (United States) Alec Burks • (United States) Glenn Robinson III

=== Free agency ===
==== Re-signed ====
Player	Signed
(United States) Klay Thompson	5-year contract worth $190 million
(United States) Kevon Looney	3-year contract worth $15 million
(United States) Damion Lee	Two-way contract / 3-year contract worth $4.5 million
(United States) Draymond Green	4-year max extension contract worth $100 million

==== Additions ====
Player	Signed	Former Team
(United States) Willie Cauley-Stein	2-year contract worth $4.4 million	Sacramento Kings
(United States) Glenn Robinson III	2-year contract worth $3.9 million	Detroit Pistons
(United States) Alec Burks	1-year contract worth $1.6 million	Sacramento Kings
(United States) Ky Bowman	Two-way contract / 3-year contract worth $3.6 million	Boston College (Undrafted)
(United States) Marquese Chriss	1-year contract worth $1.6 million / Two-way contract / 2-year contract worth $2.4 million	Cleveland Cavaliers
(Mexico) Juan Toscano-Anderson	3-year contract worth $3.6 million	Santa Cruz Warriors (NBA G League)
(United States) Zach Norvell Jr.	10-day contract worth $50,752	South Bay Lakers (NBA G League)
(United States) Jeremy Pargo	10-day contract worth $81,678	Santa Cruz Warriors (NBA G League)
(Croatia) Dragan Bender	10-day contract worth $94,850	Milwaukee Bucks
(Canada) Mychal Mulder	10-day contract worth $50,752 / 3-year contract worth 3.4 million	Sioux Falls Skyforce (NBA G League)
(United States) Chasson Randle	10-day contract worth $91,557	Tianjin Pioneers (China)

==== Subtractions ====
Player	Reason left	New Team
(United States) Quinn Cook	2-year contract worth $6 million	Los Angeles Lakers
(United States) Demarcus Cousins	1-year contract worth $3.5 million	Los Angeles Lakers
(United States) Shaun Livingston	NBA Retirement	
(United States) Jordan Bell	1-year contract worth $1.6 million	Minnesota Timberwolves
(Sweden) Jonas Jerebko	2-year contract	Khimki (Russia)
(United States) Alfonzo McKinnie	Waived	Cleveland Cavaliers
(United States) Marquese Chriss	Waived	Golden State Warriors
