= Chris Silva =

Gabonese basketball player (born 1996)

- Silva with Fenerbahçe in 2026

No. 30 – Partizan Belgrade
- Position: Center
- League: Serbian SuperLeague; ABA League; EuroLeague

Personal information
- Born: September 19, 1996 (age 30) Libreville, Gabon
- Listed height: 6 ft 9 in (2.06 m)
- Listed weight: 234 lb (106 kg)

Career information
- High school: Roselle Catholic (Roselle, New Jersey)
- College: South Carolina (2015–2019)
- NBA draft: 2019: undrafted
- Playing career: 2019–present

Career history
- 2019–2021: Miami Heat
- 2020: →Sioux Falls Skyforce
- 2021: Sacramento Kings
- 2021: Iowa Wolves
- 2021: Minnesota Timberwolves
- 2021–2022: Miami Heat
- 2022: Iowa Wolves
- 2022–2023: College Park Skyhawks
- 2023: Dallas Mavericks
- 2023–2024: College Park Skyhawks
- 2024: Piratas de Quebradillas
- 2024: Mets de Guaynabo
- 2024–2025: Bnei Herzliya
- 2025: AEK Athens
- 2026: Fenerbahçe
- 2026–present: Partizan

Career highlights
- Turkish Super League champion (2026); Turkish Cup winner (2026); First-team All-SEC (2018); First-team All-SEC – Coaches (2019); SEC Co-Defensive Player of the Year (2018); SEC All-Defensive team (2018)
- Stats at NBA.com
- Stats at Basketball Reference

Chris Silva Obame Correia Silva (born September 19, 1996) is a Gabonese professional basketball player for Partizan of the Serbian SuperLeague, the ABA League, and the EuroLeague. He played college basketball for the South Carolina Gamecocks.

== Early life ==
Silva was born in Gabon. His father, who played for the Gabon men's national basketball team, helped arrange to send Silva to the United States as a teenager to pursue a professional basketball career.

In September 2012, when Silva was 15 years old, he arrived in the United States for the first time to enroll at Roselle Catholic High School in New Jersey. Though he knew no English and had no experience playing organized basketball, he told assistant basketball coach Tommy Sacks, "Coach, I go NBA." Sacks later commented, "His ceiling is so high, one of the highest I've ever seen, because all he wants to do is get better. He wants to live in the weight room. He wants to run on his own. He wants to work out. He wants to get shots up."

== High school career ==
Initially, with the Roselle Catholic basketball team, Silva was not aware of the rules of the game. In his senior season, his team won the state championship. Silva drew interest from college basketball programs such as Seton Hall and Rhode Island, and eventually signed with the South Carolina Gamecocks. Silva said, "That's a great school, great coaches. I like everything about it, the education, the support they give to players after their career—everything."

== College career ==
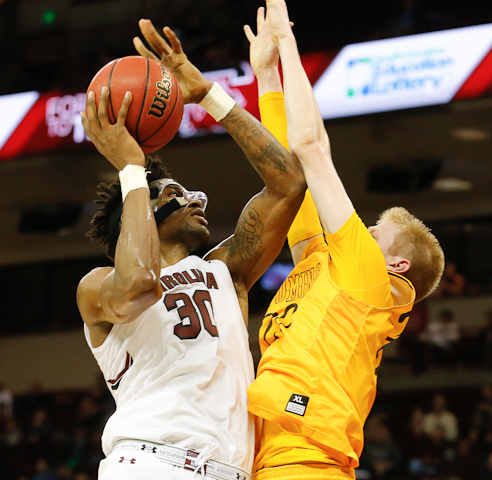
Silva with The South Carolina Gamecocks.

In 2017 Silva started all 37 games on the Gamecocks team that reached the Final Four, and had a 2-point shooting percentage of .526 (10th in the SEC). In 2018 Silva won SEC Co-Defensive Player of the Year, was First-team All-SEC, and was named to the All-Defensive team.

As a junior he averaged 14.3 points and 8.0 rebounds (4th in the SEC) per game, shot 46.7 percent from the floor, and led the conference with 213 free throws. He was named 2018 First Team All-SEC (Coaches), SEC Defensive Player of the Year, and SEC All-Defensive Team. Following the season he declared for the NBA draft but did not hire an agent. Silva was not invited to the NBA combine and decided to return to South Carolina. In 2018-19 he averaged 15.2 points (9th in the SEC), 7.6 rebounds (6th), and 1.9 blocks (4th) per game. In 2019 he was named SEC Player of the Week (3/11/2019), All-SEC Second Team (AP), ABC All-District (21) Second Team, First Team All-SEC (Coaches), and All-SEC Second Team (AP).

== Professional career ==
=== Miami Heat (2019–2021) ===
Silva was signed by the Miami Heat on July 11, 2019. On October 19, the Heat converted his deal to a two-way contract with their NBA G League affiliate, the Sioux Falls Skyforce. On October 23, Silva made his NBA debut, coming off the bench in a 120–101 win over the Memphis Grizzlies. He finished with eight points, six rebounds, and three blocks. On January 15, 2020, Silva signed a standard NBA contract with the Heat. On January 23, Silva was assigned to the Sioux Falls Skyforce. On January 26, Silva was brought back up to the Miami Heat. The Heat reached the 2020 NBA Finals, but lost in 6 games to the Los Angeles Lakers. In 44 games in 2019-20 he averaged 7.9 minutes, 3.0 points, 2.9 rebounds, and 0.5 blocks per game.

=== Sacramento Kings (2021) ===
On March 25, 2021, Silva and Maurice Harkless were traded to the Sacramento Kings in exchange for Nemanja Bjelica. On April 28, he was waived by the Kings. He played four games with the team, averaging 2.4 minutes per game.

=== Iowa Wolves (2021) ===
On September 20, 2021, Silva signed with the Minnesota Timberwolves. However, he was waived prior to the start of the season. On October 26, he signed with the Iowa Wolves. In 12 games, he averaged 15.1 points, 9.6 rebounds, 1.8 assists and 0.8 blocks, leading the Wolves in rebounds per game and blocks per game.

=== Minnesota Timberwolves (2021) ===
On December 21, 2021, Silva signed a 10-day contract with the Minnesota Timberwolves. He played one game with the team, in which he played 3.5 minutes.

=== Return to Miami (2021–2022) ===
On December 31, 2021, Silva signed a 10-day contract with the Miami Heat. On January 10, 2022, he signed a second 10-day contract. Silva signed a third 10-day contract with the Heat on January 21. He signed a fourth 10-day contract with the Heat on January 31. He played nine games with the team, in which he averaged 9.7 minutes, 2.9 points, and 3.9 rebounds per game.

=== Return to Iowa (2022) ===
He returned to the Iowa Wolves on February 9.

=== College Park Skyhawks (2022–2023) ===
On November 3, 2022, Silva was named to the opening night roster for the College Park Skyhawks. With the team in 22 games he averaged 14.8 points, 9.3 rebounds, and 1.4 blocks per game.

=== Dallas Mavericks (2023) ===
On January 31, 2023, the Dallas Mavericks announced that they had signed Silva to a 10-day contract. He signed a second 10-day contract with the team on February 10, but was waived just four days later, in order for the team to sign Justin Holiday instead. He played one game with the team, in which he played three minutes.

=== Return to College Park (2023–2024) ===
On February 14, 2023, Silva was reacquired by the College Park Skyhawks. In 25 games he averaged 17.0 points, 8.3 rebounds, and 1.1 blocks per game.

On September 25, he signed with the Atlanta Hawks, but was waived two days later. On October 29, he returned to the Skyhawks.

=== Piratas de Quebradillas (2024) ===
On April 1, 2024, Silva signed with the Piratas de Quebradillas of the Baloncesto Superior Nacional. However, he was waived on April 15 after suffering an injury. He played four games, and averaged 12.8 points and 7.8 rebounds per game.

=== Mets de Guaynabo (2024) ===
On May 20, 2024, Silva signed with the Mets de Guaynabo of the Baloncesto Superior Nacional. He played seven games, and averaged 9.1 points and 5.4 rebounds per game.

=== Bnei Herzliya (2024–2025) ===
In July 2024, Silva signed to play for Bnei Herzliya of the Israeli Basketball Premier League.

=== AEK Athens (2025) ===
On August 13, 2025, Silva signed with Greek club AEK Athens. On October 17, Silva was voted the Player of the Week of the Basketball Champions League. On November 17, Silva received a Hoops Agents Player of the Week award. He had the game-high 25 points, nine rebounds, and four assists for his team's victory. On December 11, Silva received another Hoops Agent Player of the Week award. He had the game-high 19 points, nine rebounds, and three assists in his team's win.

=== Fenerbahçe (2026) ===
On January 3, 2026, Silva signed for Fenerbahçe of the Turkish Basketbol Süper Ligi (BSL) and the EuroLeague. He signed until the end of the season with an option for an additional season.

On July 8, 2026, Silva agreed to a contract extension with Fenerbahçe.

=== Partizan (2026–present) ===
On November 13, 2026, Silva signed with Partizan of the Serbian SuperLeague, the ABA League, and the EuroLeague.

== National team career ==
On June 11, 2015, Silva was named to the Gabon national basketball team's preliminary squad for the AfroBasket 2015 by head coach Thierry Bouanga. It was considered a possibility that he would debut alongside ex-NBA player Stéphane Lasme. Silva would participate in a three-week training camp in Libreville in July.

== Career statistics ==
Legend
GP	Games played	GS	Games started	MPG	Minutes per game
FG%	Field goal percentage	3P%	3-point field goal percentage	FT%	Free throw percentage
RPG	Rebounds per game	APG	Assists per game	SPG	Steals per game
BPG	Blocks per game	PPG	Points per game	**Bold**	Career high

=== NBA ===
==== Regular season ====
Year	Team	GP	GS	MPG	FG%	3P%	FT%	RPG	APG	SPG	BPG	PPG
2019–20	Miami	**44**	0	7.9	.615	.000	.673	2.9	.5	**.2**	**.5**	**3.0**
2020–21	Miami	11	0	7.5	.692	**1.000**	.773	2.3	.5	.1	**.5**	2.7
2020–21	Sacramento	4	0	2.3	.333	—	—	.5	.0	.0	.3	.5
2021–22	Minnesota	1	0	3.0	—	—	—	1.0	.0	.0	.0	.0
2021–22	Miami	9	0	**9.8**	.533	—	**.833**	**3.9**	**.8**	.0	.1	2.9
2022–23	Dallas	1	0	3.0	**1.000**	—	—	.0	.0	.0	.0	2.0
Career		70	0	7.6	.609	.250	.707	2.7	.5	.1	.4	2.8

=== College ===
Year	Team	GP	GS	MPG	FG%	3P%	FT%	RPG	APG	SPG	BPG	PPG
2015–16	South Carolina	32	6	13.3	.482	—	.609	4.5	.2	.4	.9	5.4
2016–17	South Carolina	**37**	**37**	20.9	**.524**	—	.749	6.1	.4	.6	1.4	10.2
2017–18	South Carolina	33	33	25.8	.467	.417	**.753**	**8.0**	**1.2**	.6	1.4	14.3
2018–19	South Carolina	32	32	**26.7**	.508	**.500**	.744	7.6	.9	**.9**	**1.9**	**15.2**
Career		134	108	21.7	.497	.475	.729	6.5	.7	.6	1.4	11.3

=== EuroLeague ===
Year	Team	GP	GS	MPG	FG%	3P%	FT%	RPG	APG	SPG	BPG	PPG	PIR
2025–26	Fenerbahçe	16	0	8.4	.614	.000	.889	1.7	.4	.3	.1	4.4	4.2
2026–27	Fenerbahçe	0	0	0	.000	.000	.000	0	0	0	0	0	0
Career		16	0	8.4	.614	.000	.889	1.7	.4	.3	.1	4.4	4.2

=== FIBA Champions League ===
As of match played 10 December 2025

Year	Team	GP	GS	MPG	FG%	3P%	FT%	RPG	APG	SPG	BPG	PPG	PIR
2025–26	AEK Athens	5	5	25.6	.700	—	.821	8.0	1.8	1.6	1.0	14.8	21.0
