= KZ Okpala =

American basketball player (born 1999)

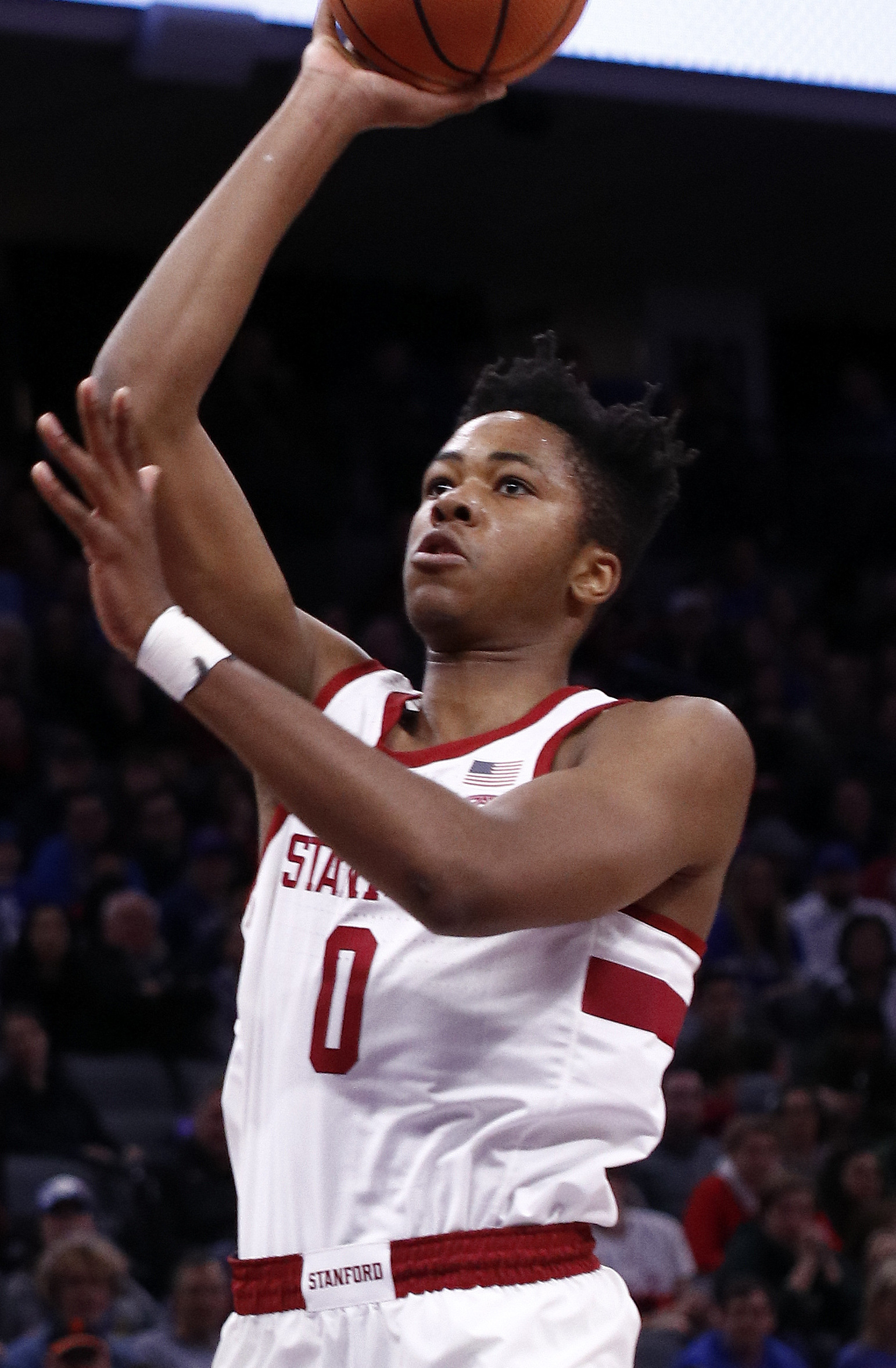
- Okpala with Stanford in 2017

Personal information
- Born: April 28, 1999 (age 27) Anaheim, California, U.S.
- Listed height: 6 ft 8 in (2.03 m)
- Listed weight: 215 lb (98 kg)

Career information
- High school: Esperanza (Anaheim, California)
- College: Stanford (2017–2019)
- NBA draft: 2019: 2nd round, 32nd overall pick
- Drafted by: Phoenix Suns
- Playing career: 2019–2023
- Position: Small forward
- Number: 4, 11, 30

Career history
- 2019–2022: Miami Heat
- 2019–2020: →Sioux Falls Skyforce
- 2022–2023: Sacramento Kings
- 2023: →Stockton Kings

Career highlights
- First-team All-Pac-12 (2019)
- Stats at NBA.com
- Stats at Basketball Reference

Chikezie Jake "KZ" Okpala (born April 28, 1999) is an American-Nigerian former professional basketball player who played in the National Basketball Association (NBA). He played college basketball for the Stanford Cardinal and played in the NBA for the Miami Heat and Sacramento Kings.

== Early life ==
Okpala was born to Nigerian parents Martin and Mary Okpala, who settled in Orange County, California before his birth. He began playing basketball at age 4 but did not join a youth league because he found them unruly. Okpala grew up playing the game against adults at fitness clubs and parks. When he was in fourth grade, his family moved from Fresno back to Orange County, living in Yorba Linda, where he reached out to a local club team. Okpala also played football and baseball in his childhood before focusing on basketball by age 11.

== High school career ==
Okpala attended Esperanza High School in Anaheim, California. He grew from 5 ft 10 in (1.78 m) to 6 ft 8 in (2.03 m) during his four years playing high school basketball. Okpala joined the starting lineup as a sophomore. On January 16, 2015, during that season, he made a buzzer-beating three-pointer to defeat El Dorado High School. As a junior, Okpala averaged 23 points and 8 rebounds per game to lead Esperanza to a conference title and win Crestview League Player of the Year honors. His most notable moment in that year was when Okpala dunked on Trevor Hooks of Orange High School.

In his senior season, he improved to 30 points, 11 rebounds, and 2 blocks per game. On November 25, 2016, Okpala tallied 41 points in a 76–59 win over Spartanburg Day School at the Tournament of Champions. He scored a career-high 46 points against Crossroads School, which set a school record. On March 26, 2017, Okpala led Esperanza to its first California Interscholastic Federation (CIF) Division II championship, scoring 22 points versus Moreau Catholic High School. He was named Crestview League Player of the Year and played at the Ballislife All-American Game.

Okpala was a consensus four-star recruit and one of the top high school players in California. He received an offer from Stanford in July 2016, shortly before committing there.

== College career ==
Okpala missed his first 11 games of his freshman season at Stanford because of academic ineligibility. On December 21, 2017, after being cleared to play, he debuted with 6 points in 28 minutes against Kansas. On March 3, 2018, Okpala recorded his first double-double, tallying 18 points and 10 rebounds in an 84–83 win over Arizona State. He scored a season-high 23 points on March 8, in an 88–77 loss to UCLA. As a freshman, Okpala averaged 10 points, 3.7 rebounds, and 1.8 assists per game.

On November 6, 2018, he made his sophomore debut with 29 points, 10 rebounds, and 5 assists in a 96–74 win over Seattle. Six days later, Okpala earned Pac-12 Conference player of the week recognition. On January 9, 2019, he had another strong performance, erupting for 29 points, 6 rebounds, and 4 assists against Arizona.

At the conclusion of his sophomore season, Okpala announced his intention to forgo his final two seasons of collegiate eligibility and declare for the 2019 NBA draft.

== Professional career ==
=== Miami Heat (2019–2022) ===
Okpala was drafted by the Phoenix Suns with the 32nd overall pick in the 2019 NBA draft but was soon after traded to the Miami Heat. On July 7, 2019, the Heat announced that they had signed Okpala to a three-year, $4.2 million contract. He played in two of the Heat's first four games, but missed 19 games due to an Achilles strain. In December, Okpala was assigned to the Heat's G League affiliate, the Sioux Falls Skyforce; he averaged 11.7 points, 7 rebounds, 2 assists, 1.4 steals and 1.1 blocks per game in 20 appearances with the Skyforce. Okpala played in five games during his rookie campaign, averaging 1.4 points and 1.0 rebounds.

Okpala made 37 appearances (including nine starts) for Miami during the 2020–21 NBA season, recording averages of 2.5 points, 1.8 rebounds, and 0.5 assists. On August 1, 2021, Okpala joined the Heat for the NBA Summer League. He made 21 appearances for the Heat during the 2021–22 season, averaging 3.7 points and 2.0 rebounds.

On February 9, 2022, Okpala was traded to the Oklahoma City Thunder in exchange for draft considerations. He was waived by Oklahoma City two days later.

=== Sacramento Kings (2022–2023) ===
On September 14, 2022, Okpala signed a two-year, $4 million contract with the Sacramento Kings. Okpala logged 35 appearances (including three starts) for Sacramento during the 2022–23 NBA season, recording averages of 1.3 points, 1.0 rebounds, and 0.4 assists. On February 25, 2023, Okpala was waived. Prior to his release, Okpala had been suffering from bilateral knee soreness, and had been scheduled for season–ending knee surgery. Okpala later attributed his medical retirement from basketball to the knee injury.

== National team career ==
Okpala played for the Nigerian national basketball team at the 2020 Summer Olympics.

== Career statistics ==
Legend
GP	Games played	GS	Games started	MPG	Minutes per game
FG%	Field goal percentage	3P%	3-point field goal percentage	FT%	Free throw percentage
RPG	Rebounds per game	APG	Assists per game	SPG	Steals per game
BPG	Blocks per game	PPG	Points per game	**Bold**	Career high

=== NBA ===
==== Regular season ====
Year	Team	GP	GS	MPG	FG%	3P%	FT%	RPG	APG	SPG	BPG	PPG
2019–20	Miami	5	0	5.2	**.600**	.000	.500	1.0	.2	**.4**	.2	1.4
2020–21	Miami	**37**	**9**	**12.1**	.375	.240	.533	1.8	.5	.3	**.3**	2.5
2021–22	Miami	21	0	11.6	.435	**.346**	.727	**2.0**	**.7**	.2	**.3**	**3.7**
2022–23	Sacramento	35	3	7.1	.421	.333	**.875**	1.0	.4	.2	.2	1.3
Career		98	12	9.8	.409	.286	.667	1.5	.5	.2	.3	2.3

==== Playoffs ====
Year	Team	GP	GS	MPG	FG%	3P%	FT%	RPG	APG	SPG	BPG	PPG
2021	Miami	2	0	3.0	.000	.000	.000	.0	.0	.0	.0	.0
Career		2	0	3.0	.000	.000	.000	.0	.0	.0	.0	.0

=== College ===
Year	Team	GP	GS	MPG	FG%	3P%	FT%	RPG	APG	SPG	BPG	PPG
2017–18	Stanford	23	21	28.5	.393	.226	**.679**	3.7	1.8	**1.0**	**.6**	10.0
2018–19	Stanford	**29**	**29**	**32.7**	**.465**	**.375**	.671	**5.7**	**2.0**	**1.0**	.5	**16.9**
Career		52	50	30.8	.440	.336	.674	4.8	1.9	1.0	.5	13.9
