= Jordan Bone =

American basketball player (born 1997)

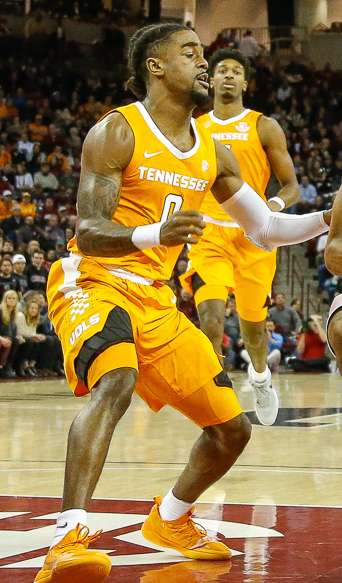
- Bone with Tennessee in 2019

Free agent
- Position: Point guard

Personal information
- Born: November 5, 1997 (age 29) Nashville, Tennessee, U.S.
- Listed height: 6 ft 2 in (1.88 m)
- Listed weight: 180 lb (82 kg)

Career information
- High school: The Ensworth School (Nashville, Tennessee)
- College: Tennessee (2016–2019)
- NBA draft: 2019: 2nd round, 57th overall pick
- Drafted by: New Orleans Pelicans
- Playing career: 2019–present

Career history
- 2019–2020: Detroit Pistons
- 2019–2020: →Grand Rapids Drive
- 2020–2021: Orlando Magic
- 2021: Delaware Blue Coats
- 2021: Beşiktaş Icrypex
- 2021–2022: Zaragoza
- 2022–2023: Wisconsin Herd
- 2023: Fort Wayne Mad Ants
- 2023–2024: Vanoli Cremona
- 2025: Hapoel Holon
- 2025–2026: Hapoel Galil Elyon
- 2026: HLA Alicante

Career highlights
- Second-team All-SEC (2019)
- Stats at NBA.com
- Stats at Basketball Reference

Jordan Latham Bone (born November 5, 1997) is an American professional basketball player who last played for HLA Alicante of the Spanish Primera FEB. He played college basketball for the Tennessee Volunteers.

== High school career ==
Bone attended The Ensworth School in Nashville, Tennessee, where he played for the private high school's varsity basketball team. He was teammates with NBA player James Wiseman. He was ranked by 247Sports as the 171st overall prospect in his class.

== College career ==
As a freshman playing for the University of Tennessee, Bone averaged 7.2 points and 2.9 assists per game, only to improve on those averages as a sophomore with 7.3 points and 3.5 assists. As a junior, Bone had a breakout season, posting 13.5 points, 5.8 assists, and 3.2 rebounds per game and helping Tennessee to secure a 31–6 season as well as to make a Sweet 16 appearance. He was named to the Second-team All-SEC. At season's end, he declared for the 2019 NBA draft and forfeited his remaining year of eligibility.

== Professional career ==
=== Detroit Pistons (2019–2020) ===
Bone was selected in the second round with the 57th overall pick in the 2019 NBA draft by the New Orleans Pelicans, who later traded him to the Detroit Pistons via the Atlanta Hawks and Philadelphia 76ers.

On July 8, 2019, Bone signed a two-way contract with the Pistons. He will split playing time between the Pistons and their NBA G League affiliate, the Grand Rapids Drive. Bone scored 22 points against the Memphis Hustle on December 26, 2019, but suffered a knee injury and missed a game.

=== Orlando Magic (2020–2021) ===
On November 27, 2020, Bone signed a two-way contract with the Orlando Magic. On February 3, 2021, the Orlando Magic announced that they had waived Bone.

=== Delaware Blue Coats (2021) ===
On February 6, 2021, the Delaware Blue Coats announced that they had acquired Bone and a 2021–22 third-round pick from the Lakeland Magic in exchange for the returning player right to J.P. Macura, the returning player right to Doral Moore and a 2021–22 second-round pick. He made his debut for the Blue Coats on February 11, 2021.

=== Beşiktaş (2021) ===
On August 23, 2021, Bone signed with Beşiktaş Icrypex of the Basketbol Süper Ligi (BSL). He averaged 11.7 points, 3.6 assists, and 3.6 rebounds per game in 11 games.

=== Basket Zaragoza (2021–2022) ===
On December 9, 2021, Bone signed with Basket Zaragoza of the Spanish Liga ACB.

=== Wisconsin Herd (2022–2023) ===
On November 3, 2022, Bone was named to the opening night roster for the Wisconsin Herd.

=== Fort Wayne Mad Ants (2023) ===
On February 24, 2023, Bone was traded to the Fort Wayne Mad Ants in exchange for Deividas Sirvydis.

=== Vanoli Cremona (2023–2024) ===
On July 18, 2023, Bone signed with Vanoli Cremona of the Lega Basket Serie A.

On February 27, 2026, he signed for HLA Alicante of the Spanish Primera FEB.

== Career statistics ==
Legend
GP	Games played	GS	Games started	MPG	Minutes per game
FG%	Field goal percentage	3P%	3-point field goal percentage	FT%	Free throw percentage
RPG	Rebounds per game	APG	Assists per game	SPG	Steals per game
BPG	Blocks per game	PPG	Points per game	**Bold**	Career high

=== NBA ===
Year	Team	GP	GS	MPG	FG%	3P%	FT%	RPG	APG	SPG	BPG	PPG
2019–20	Detroit	10	0	5.3	.250	.200	–	.4	.8	**.1**	.0	1.2
2020–21	Orlando	**14**	0	**14.0**	**.426**	**.313**	–	**1.7**	**1.3**	**.1**	.0	**4.0**
Career		24	0	10.4	.378	.286	–	1.2	1.1	.1	.0	2.8

=== College ===
Year	Team	GP	GS	MPG	FG%	3P%	FT%	RPG	APG	SPG	BPG	PPG
2016–17	Tennessee	23	17	19.6	.372	.304	.769	1.7	2.9	.5	0	7.2
2017–18	Tennessee	35	33	23.1	.391	**.380**	.821	2.1	3.5	**.7**	**.1**	7.3
2018–19	Tennessee	**37**	**37**	**32.9**	**.465**	.355	**.835**	**3.2**	**5.8**	**.7**	**.1**	**13.5**
Career		95	87	26.1	.424	.353	.817	2.4	4.3	.7	.1	9.7
