= 2019–20 Dallas Mavericks season =

NBA professional basketball team season

- Head coach: Rick Carlisle
- President: Donnie Nelson
- General manager: Donnie Nelson
- Owner: Mark Cuban
- Arena: American Airlines Center

Results
- Record: 43–32 (.573)
- Place: Division: 2nd (Southwest); Conference: 7th (Western)
- Playoff finish: First round (lost to Clippers 2–4)
- Stats at Basketball Reference

Local media
- Television: FS Southwest; KTXA
- Radio: KESN

The 2019–20 Dallas Mavericks season was the 40th season of the franchise in the National Basketball Association (NBA). This was the first season since 1997–1998 in which Dirk Nowitzki was not on the Mavericks roster as he retired in 2019. Nowitzki spent his entire 21-year career with the Mavericks, setting an NBA record.

The season was suspended by the league officials following the games of March 11 after it was reported that Rudy Gobert tested positive for COVID-19. The Mavericks and the Denver Nuggets played the final game before the suspension of the season, a 113–97 Mavericks win.

The Mavericks were one of the 22 teams invited to the NBA Bubble, and resumed play on July 31 with a 153–149 loss against the Houston Rockets. On August 2, after the Memphis Grizzlies lost against the San Antonio Spurs, the Mavericks clinched a spot in the 2020 NBA playoffs no worse than the seventh seed, marking their first trip to the playoffs since 2016. The Mavericks entered the playoffs as the seventh seed, facing the second seed Los Angeles Clippers in the first round, losing in six games.

The Mavericks averaged an offensive rating of 115.9 points scored per 100 possessions in the regular season, the highest in NBA history.

== Draft ==
Round	Pick	Player	Position	Nationality	College / club
2	37	Deividas Sirvydis	SF	Lithuania	(Lithuania) BC Rytas

The Mavericks' 2019 first-round draft pick was part of the package traded to the Atlanta Hawks for Luka Dončić in 2018. The 37th pick was traded to the Detroit Pistons in exchange for the 45th pick along with two future second-round picks.

== Roster ==
2019–20 Dallas Mavericks roster
Players

Pos.	No.	Player	Height	Weight	DOB	From
G	5	J. J. Barea	5 ft 10 in (1.78 m)	180 lb (82 kg)	1984–06–26	Northeastern
G	13	Jalen Brunson	6 ft 1 in (1.85 m)	190 lb (86 kg)	1996–08–31	Villanova
G	32	Trey Burke	6 ft 0 in (1.83 m)	185 lb (84 kg)	1992–11–12	Michigan
C	33	Willie Cauley-Stein	7 ft 0 in (2.13 m)	240 lb (109 kg)	1993–08–18	Kentucky
G	3	Antonius Cleveland (TW)	6 ft 5 in (1.96 m)	195 lb (88 kg)	1994–02–02	Southeast Missouri State
G	30	Seth Curry	6 ft 2 in (1.88 m)	185 lb (84 kg)	1990–08–23	Duke
G/F	77	Luka Dončić	6 ft 7 in (2.01 m)	230 lb (104 kg)	1999–02–28	Slovenia
F	10	Dorian Finney-Smith	6 ft 7 in (2.01 m)	220 lb (100 kg)	1993–05–04	Florida
G/F	11	Tim Hardaway	6 ft 5 in (1.96 m)	205 lb (93 kg)	1992–03–16	Michigan
F	44	Justin Jackson	6 ft 7 in (2.01 m)	220 lb (100 kg)	1995–03–28	North Carolina
F	9	Michael Kidd-Gilchrist	6 ft 6 in (1.98 m)	232 lb (105 kg)	1993–09–26	Kentucky
F	42	Maxi Kleber	6 ft 10 in (2.08 m)	240 lb (109 kg)	1992–01–29	Germany
G	1	Courtney Lee	6 ft 5 in (1.96 m)	215 lb (98 kg)	1985–10–03	Western Kentucky
C	51	Boban Marjanović	7 ft 4 in (2.24 m)	290 lb (132 kg)	1988–08–15	Serbia
F/C	6	Kristaps Porziņģis	7 ft 3 in (2.21 m)	240 lb (109 kg)	1995–08–02	Latvia
F/C	7	Dwight Powell	6 ft 10 in (2.08 m)	240 lb (109 kg)	1991–07–20	Stanford
G/F	23	Josh Reaves (TW)	6 ft 4 in (1.93 m)	214 lb (97 kg)	1997–06–04	Penn State
G	55	Delon Wright	6 ft 5 in (1.96 m)	185 lb (84 kg)	1992–04–26	Utah

Coaches
Head coach
- Rick Carlisle
Assistant(s)
- Darrell Armstrong
- Jamahl Mosley
- Stephen Silas
- Mike Weinar

Legend
- (DP) Unsigned draft pick
- (FA) Free agent
- (S) Suspended
- (GL) On assignment to G League affiliate
- (TW) Two-way affiliate player
- Injured

Roster
Updated: 2020–01-25

== Standings ==
=== Division ===
Southwest Division	W	L	PCT	GB	Home	Road	Div	GP
y – Houston Rockets	44	28	.611	–	24‍–‍12	20‍–‍16	8–5	72
x – Dallas Mavericks	43	32	.573	2.5	20‍–‍18	23‍–‍14	10–4	75
pi – Memphis Grizzlies	34	39	.466	10.5	20‍–‍17	14‍–‍22	4–9	73
San Antonio Spurs	32	39	.451	11.5	19‍–‍15	13‍–‍24	7–6	71
New Orleans Pelicans	30	42	.417	14.0	15‍–‍21	15‍–‍21	4–9	72

=== Conference ===
Western Conference
#	Team	W	L	PCT	GB	GP
1	c – Los Angeles Lakers *	52	19	.732	–	71
2	x – Los Angeles Clippers	49	23	.681	3.5	72
3	y – Denver Nuggets *	46	27	.630	7.0	73
4	y – Houston Rockets *	44	28	.611	8.5	72
5	x – Oklahoma City Thunder	44	28	.611	8.5	72
6	x – Utah Jazz	44	28	.611	8.5	72
7	x – Dallas Mavericks	43	32	.573	11.0	75
8	x – Portland Trail Blazers	35	39	.473	18.5	74
9	pi – Memphis Grizzlies	34	39	.466	19.0	73
10	Phoenix Suns	34	39	.466	19.0	73
11	San Antonio Spurs	32	39	.451	20.0	71
12	Sacramento Kings	31	41	.431	21.5	72
13	New Orleans Pelicans	30	42	.417	22.5	72
14	Minnesota Timberwolves	19	45	.297	29.5	64
15	Golden State Warriors	15	50	.231	34.0	65

== Game log ==
=== Preseason ===
2019–20 game log
Total: 2–3 (home: 1–1; road: 1–2)
Preseason: 2–3 (home: 1–1; road: 1–2)

Game	Date	Team	Score	High points	High rebounds	High assists	Location Attendance	Record
1	October 8	@ Oklahoma City	L 104–119	Kleber, Jackson (14)	Ryan Broekhoff (10)	Jalen Brunson (5)	BOK Center; 12,055	0–1
2	October 9	@ Detroit	L 117–124	Luka Dončić (21)	Luka Dončić (8)	Luka Dončić (5)	Little Caesars Arena; 9,695	0–2
3	October 12	Milwaukee	L 111–118	Luka Dončić (27)	Boban Marjanović (8)	three players (4)	American Airlines Center; 17,082	0–3
4	October 14	Oklahoma City	W 107–70	Luka Dončić (27)	Kristaps Porziņģis (13)	J. J. Barea (8)	American Airlines Center; 15,305	1–3
5	October 17	@ LA Clippers	W 102–87	Jackson, Porziņģis (18)	Dončić, Porziņģis (13)	Jalen Brunson (7)	Rogers Arena; 17,204	2–3

2019–20 season schedule

=== Regular season ===
The schedule was announced on August 12, 2019.

The "seeding games" schedule for the restart was announced on June 26, 2020.

2019–20 game log
Total: 43–32 (home: 20–18; road: 23–14)
October: 3–1 (home: 1–1; road: 2–0)

Game	Date	Team	Score	High points	High rebounds	High assists	Location Attendance	Record
1	October 23	Washington	W 108–100	Luka Dončić (34)	Luka Dončić (9)	three players (3)	American Airlines Center; 19,816	1–0
2	October 25	@ New Orleans	W 123–116	Luka Dončić (25)	Dončić, Kleber (10)	Luka Dončić (10)	Smoothie King Center; 17,027	2–0
3	October 27	Portland	L 119–121	Kristaps Porziņģis (32)	Luka Dončić (12)	Luka Dončić (9)	American Airlines Center; 19,707	2–1
4	October 29	@ Denver	W 109–106	Hardaway Jr., Kleber (14)	Kristaps Porziņģis (14)	Jalen Brunson (8)	Pepsi Center; 16,605	3–1

November : 9–5 (home: 5–3; road: 4–2)

Game	Date	Team	Score	High points	High rebounds	High assists	Location Attendance	Record
5	November 1	L. A. Lakers	L 110–119 (OT)	Luka Dončić (31)	Luka Dončić (13)	Luka Dončić (15)	American Airlines Center; 20,358	3–2
6	November 3	@ Cleveland	W 131–111	Luka Dončić (29)	Luka Dončić (14)	Luka Dončić (15)	Rocket Mortgage FieldHouse; 18,078	4–2
7	November 6	Orlando	W 107–106	Luka Dončić (27)	Porziņģis, Powell (8)	Luka Dončić (7)	American Airlines Center; 19,487	5–2
8	November 8	New York	L 102–106	Luka Dončić (38)	Luka Dončić (14)	Luka Dončić (10)	American Airlines Center; 20,257	5–3
9	November 9	@ Memphis	W 138–122	Luka Dončić (24)	Luka Dončić (14)	Luka Dončić (8)	FedExForum; 15,753	6–3
10	November 11	@ Boston	L 106–116	Luka Dončić (34)	Maxi Kleber (8)	Luka Dončić (9)	TD Garden; 18,624	6–4
11	November 14	@ New York	L 103–106	Luka Dončić (33)	Kristaps Porziņģis (11)	Luka Dončić (11)	Madison Square Garden; 19,812	6–5
12	November 16	Toronto	W 110–102	Luka Dončić (26)	Dončić, Porziņģis (15)	Luka Dončić (7)	American Airlines Center; 19,926	7–5
13	November 18	San Antonio	W 117–110	Luka Dončić (42)	Luka Dončić (11)	Luka Dončić (12)	American Airlines Center; 19,637	8–5
14	November 20	Golden State	W 142–94	Luka Dončić (35)	Dončić, Porziņģis (10)	Luka Dončić (11)	American Airlines Center; 19,569	9–5
15	November 22	Cleveland	W 143–101	Luka Dončić (30)	Dončić, Porziņģis (7)	Luka Dončić (14)	American Airlines Center; 19,639	10–5
16	November 24	@ Houston	W 137–123	Luka Dončić (41)	Kristaps Porziņģis (13)	Luka Dončić (10)	Toyota Center; 18,055	11–5
17	November 26	L. A. Clippers	L 99–114	Luka Dončić (22)	Kristaps Porziņģis (10)	Luka Dončić (6)	American Airlines Center; 20,407	11–6
18	November 29	@ Phoenix	W 120–113	Luka Dončić (42)	Kristaps Porziņģis (13)	Luka Dončić (11)	Talking Stick Resort Arena; 18,055	12–6

December : 9–6 (home: 3–3; road: 6–3)

Game	Date	Team	Score	High points	High rebounds	High assists	Location Attendance	Record
19	December 1	@ L. A. Lakers	W 114–100	Luka Dončić (27)	three players (9)	Luka Dončić (10)	Staples Center; 18,997	13–6
20	December 3	@ New Orleans	W 118–97	Luka Dončić (33)	Luka Dončić (18)	J. J. Barea (6)	Smoothie King Center; 14,664	14–6
21	December 4	Minnesota	W 121–114	Dwight Powell (24)	Luka Dončić (7)	Luka Dončić (6)	American Airlines Center; 19,671	15–6
22	December 7	New Orleans	W 130–84	Luka Dončić (26)	Boban Marjanović (16)	Luka Dončić (9)	American Airlines Center; 19,456	16–6
23	December 8	Sacramento	L 106–110	Tim Hardaway Jr. (29)	Finney-Smith, Porziņģis (8)	Luka Dončić (8)	American Airlines Center; 19,566	16–7
24	December 12	@ Detroit	W 122–111	Luka Dončić (41)	Luka Dončić (12)	Luka Dončić (11)	Mexico City Arena; 20,064	17–7
25	December 14	Miami	L 118–122 (OT)	Tim Hardaway Jr. (28)	Kristaps Porziņģis (14)	Jalen Brunson (8)	American Airlines Center; 20,333	17–8
26	December 16	@ Milwaukee	W 120–116	Curry, Porziņģis (26)	Kristaps Porziņģis (12)	Jalen Brunson (11)	Fiserv Forum; 17,727	18–8
27	December 18	Boston	L 103–109	Kristaps Porziņģis (23)	Kristaps Porziņģis (13)	Jalen Brunson (11)	American Airlines Center; 20,181	18–9
28	December 20	@ Philadelphia	W 117–98	Tim Hardaway Jr. (27)	Kristaps Porziņģis (18)	Jalen Brunson (7)	Wells Fargo Center; 20,778	19–9
29	December 22	@ Toronto	L 107–110	Jalen Brunson (21)	Kristaps Porziņģis (12)	Jalen Brunson (9)	Scotiabank Arena; 19,800	19–10
30	December 26	San Antonio	W 102–98	Luka Dončić (24)	Maxi Kleber (12)	Luka Dončić (8)	American Airlines Center; 20,427	20–10
31	December 28	@ Golden State	W 141–121	Luka Dončić (31)	Luka Dončić (12)	Luka Dončić (15)	Chase Center; 18,064	21–10
32	December 29	@ L. A. Lakers	L 95–108	Luka Dončić (19)	Dwight Powell (11)	Luka Dončić (7)	Staples Center; 18,997	21–11
33	December 31	@ Oklahoma City	L 101–106	Luka Dončić (35)	Maxi Kleber (14)	Luka Dončić (7)	Chesapeake Energy Arena; 18,203	21–12

January : 8–7 (home: 4–5; road: 4–2)

Game	Date	Team	Score	High points	High rebounds	High assists	Location Attendance	Record
34	January 2	Brooklyn	W 123–111	Luka Dončić (31)	Luka Dončić (13)	Luka Dončić (7)	American Airlines Center; 20,289	22–12
35	January 4	Charlotte	L 120–123 (OT)	Luka Dončić (39)	Luka Dončić (12)	Luka Dončić (10)	American Airlines Center; 20,327	22–13
36	January 6	Chicago	W 118–110	Luka Dončić (38)	Luka Dončić (11)	Luka Dončić (10)	American Airlines Center; 20,238	23–13
37	January 8	Denver	L 106–107	Luka Dončić (27)	Luka Dončić (10)	Luka Dončić (9)	American Airlines Center; 20,314	23–14
38	January 10	L. A. Lakers	L 114–129	Luka Dončić (27)	Dončić, Marjanovic (10)	Luka Dončić (7)	American Airlines Center; 20,542	23–15
39	January 11	Philadelphia	W 109–91	Dončić, Powell (19)	Dwight Powell (12)	Luka Dončić (12)	American Airlines Center; 20,244	24–15
40	January 14	@ Golden State	W 124–97	Dwight Powell (21)	Boban Marjanovic (11)	Jalen Brunson (5)	Chase Center; 18,064	25–15
41	January 15	@ Sacramento	W 127–123	Luka Dončić (25)	Luka Dončić (15)	Luka Dončić (17)	Golden 1 Center; 17,029	26–15
42	January 17	Portland	W 120–112	Luka Dončić (35)	Luka Dončić (8)	Luka Dončić (7)	American Airlines Center; 20,283	27–15
43	January 21	L. A. Clippers	L 107–110	Luka Dončić (36)	Luka Dončić (10)	Luka Dončić (9)	American Airlines Center; 19,783	27–16
44	January 23	@ Portland	W 133–125	Luka Dončić (27)	Dorian Finney-Smith (10)	Luka Dončić (9)	Moda Center; 18,574	28–16
45	January 25	@ Utah	L 107–112	Luka Dončić (25)	Dorian Finney-Smith (10)	Luka Dončić (7)	Vivint Smart Home Arena; 18,306	28–17
46	January 27	@ Oklahoma City	W 107–97	Luka Dončić (29)	Delon Wright (11)	Luka Dončić (5)	Chesapeake Energy Arena; 18,203	29–17
47	January 28	Phoenix	L 104–133	Luka Dončić (21)	Luka Dončić (6)	J. J. Barea (7)	American Airlines Center; 20,216	29–18
48	January 31	@ Houston	L 121–128	Kristaps Porziņģis (35)	Kristaps Porziņģis (12)	J. J. Barea (9)	Toyota Center; 18,055	29–19

February : 7–5 (home: 3–2; road: 4–3)

Game	Date	Team	Score	High points	High rebounds	High assists	Location Attendance	Record
49	February 1	Atlanta	W 123–100	Jalen Brunson (27)	Willie Cauley-Stein (10)	Jalen Brunson (8)	American Airlines Center; 20,328	30–19
50	February 3	@ Indiana	W 112–103	Kristaps Porziņģis (38)	Kristaps Porziņģis (12)	Tim Hardaway Jr. (5)	Bankers Life Fieldhouse; 15,086	31–19
51	February 5	Memphis	L 107–121	Kristaps Porziņģis (32)	Kristaps Porziņģis (12)	Jalen Brunson (6)	American Airlines Center; 20,069	31–20
52	February 7	@ Washington	L 118–119	Seth Curry (20)	Kristaps Porziņģis (9)	Tim Hardaway Jr. (7)	Capital One Arena; 20,476	31–21
53	February 8	@ Charlotte	W 116–100	Seth Curry (26)	Willie Cauley-Stein (10)	Delon Wright (7)	Spectrum Center; 19,370	32–21
54	February 10	Utah	L 119–123	Tim Hardaway Jr. (33)	Finney-Smith, Porziņģis (5)	Barea, Brunson (6)	American Airlines Center; 19,793	32–22
55	February 12	Sacramento	W 130–111	Luka Dončić (33)	Kristaps Porziņģis (13)	Luka Dončić (8)	American Airlines Center; 19,842	33–22
56	February 21	@ Orlando	W 122–106	Luka Dončić (33)	Dončić, Porziņģis (10)	Luka Dončić (8)	Amway Center; 18,846	34–22
57	February 22	@ Atlanta	L 107–111	Tim Hardaway Jr. (33)	Jackson, Kleber (8)	three players (5)	State Farm Arena; 17,050	34–23
58	February 24	Minnesota	W 139–123	Tim Hardaway Jr. (23)	Dončić, Porziņģis (9)	Luka Dončić (9)	American Airlines Center; 19,936	35–23
59	February 26	@ San Antonio	W 109–103	Kristaps Porziņģis (28)	Kristaps Porziņģis (12)	Luka Dončić (14)	AT&T Center; 18,354	36–23
60	February 28	@ Miami	L 118–126	Seth Curry (37)	Kristaps Porziņģis (13)	Luka Dončić (11)	American Airlines Arena; 19,704	36–24

March : 4–3 (home: 3–1; road: 1–2)

Game	Date	Team	Score	High points	High rebounds	High assists	Location Attendance	Record
61	March 1	@ Minnesota	W 111–91	Kristaps Porziņģis (38)	Kristaps Porziņģis (13)	J. J. Barea (7)	Target Center; 18,058	37–24
62	March 2	@ Chicago	L 107–109	Tim Hardaway Jr. (26)	Boban Marjanović (12)	Luka Dončić (9)	United Center; 18,407	37–25
63	March 4	New Orleans	W 127–123 (OT)	Kristaps Porziņģis (34)	Luka Dončić (17)	Luka Dončić (10)	American Airlines Center; 20,459	38–25
64	March 6	Memphis	W 121–96	Kristaps Porziņģis (26)	Kristaps Porziņģis (11)	Luka Dončić (6)	American Airlines Center; 20,370	39–25
65	March 8	Indiana	L 109–112	Luka Dončić (36)	Luka Dončić (10)	Luka Dončić (8)	American Airlines Center; 20,324	39–26
66	March 10	@ San Antonio	L 109–119	Luka Dončić (38)	Kristaps Porziņģis (12)	Luka Dončić (8)	AT&T Center; 18,354	39–27
67	March 11	Denver	W 113–97	Boban Marjanović (31)	Boban Marjanović (17)	Luka Dončić (9)	American Airlines Center; 20,302	40–27

Seeding games: 3–5 (home: 1–3; road: 2–2)

Game	Date	Team	Score	High points	High rebounds	High assists	Location Attendance	Record
68	July 31	Houston	L 149–153 (OT)	Kristaps Porziņģis (39)	Kristaps Porziņģis (16)	Luka Dončić (10)	The Arena; No In-Person Attendance	40–28
69	August 2	@ Phoenix	L 115–117	Luka Dončić (40)	Finney-Smith, Hardaway Jr. (10)	Luka Dončić (11)	Visa Athletic Center; No In-Person Attendance	40–29
70	August 4	@ Sacramento	W 114–110 (OT)	Luka Dončić (34)	Luka Dončić (20)	Luka Dončić (12)	HP Field House; No In-Person Attendance	41–29
71	August 6	L. A. Clippers	L 111–126	Kristaps Porziņģis (30)	Kristaps Porziņģis (9)	Luka Dončić (6)	HP Field House; No In-Person Attendance	41–30
72	August 8	Milwaukee	W 136–132 (OT)	Luka Dončić (36)	Luka Dončić (14)	Luka Dončić (19)	The Arena; No In-Person Attendance	42–30
73	August 10	@ Utah	W 122–114	Tim Hardaway Jr. (27)	Boban Marjanović (9)	J. J. Barea (8)	The Arena; No In-Person Attendance	43–30
74	August 11	Portland	L 131–134	Kristaps Porziņģis (36)	Luka Dončić (8)	Burke, Dončić (9)	The Arena; No In-Person Attendance	43–31
75	August 13	@ Phoenix	L 102–128	Dončić, Marjanović (18)	Marjanović (20)	Barea, Wright (4)	The Arena; No In-Person Attendance	43–32

Cancelled games

Game	Date	Team	Score	High points	High rebounds	High assists	Location Attendance	Record
68	March 14	Phoenix					American Airlines Center	
69	March 16	@ LA Clippers					Staples Center	
70	March 17	@ Sacramento					Golden 1 Center	
71	March 19	@ Portland					Moda Center	
72	March 21	@ Phoenix					Talking Stick Resort Arena	
73	March 23	Houston					American Airlines Center	
74	March 26	Utah					American Airlines Center	
75	March 29	Milwaukee					American Airlines Center	
76	April 1	@ Minnesota					Target Center	
77	April 3	@ Memphis					FedExForum	
78	April 5	@ Brooklyn					Barclays Center	
79	April 7	Houston					American Airlines Center	
80	April 11	Detroit					American Airlines Center	
81	April 13	@ Denver					Pepsi Center	
82	April 15	Oklahoma City					American Airlines Center	

2019–20 season schedule

=== Postseason ===
2020 playoff game log
Total: 2–4 (home: 1–2; road: 1–2)
First round: 2–4 (home: 1–2; road: 1–2)

Game	Date	Team	Score	High points	High rebounds	High assists	Location Attendance	Series
1	August 17	@ L. A. Clippers	L 110–118	Luka Dončić (42)	Boban Marjanović (8)	Luka Dončić (9)	The Arena; No In-Person Attendance	0–1
2	August 19	@ L. A. Clippers	W 127–114	Luka Dončić (28)	Maxi Kleber (10)	Luka Dončić (7)	The Arena; No In-Person Attendance	1–1
3	August 21	L. A. Clippers	L 122–130	Kristaps Porzingis (34)	Kristaps Porzingis (13)	Luka Dončić (10)	The Arena; No In-Person Attendance	1–2
4	August 23	L. A. Clippers	W 135–133 (OT)	Luka Dončić (43)	Luka Dončić (17)	Luka Dončić (13)	The Arena; No In-Person Attendance	2–2
5	August 25	@ L. A. Clippers	L 111–154	Luka Dončić (22)	Luka Dončić (8)	Dončić, Finney-Smith (4)	The Arena; No In-Person Attendance	2–3
6	August 30	L. A. Clippers	L 97–111	Luka Dončić (38)	Burke, Dončić (9)	Luka Dončić (9)	The Arena; No In-Person Attendance	2–4

2020 playoff schedule

== Player statistics ==
=== Regular season ===
Player	POS	GP	GS	MP	REB	AST	STL	BLK	PTS	MPG	RPG	APG	SPG	BPG	PPG
Maxi Kleber	PF	74	21	1,890	388	88	25	83	672	25.5	5.2	1.2	.3	1.1	9.1
Delon Wright	PG	73	5	1,570	280	244	85	22	504	21.5	3.8	3.3	1.2	.3	6.9
Dorian Finney-Smith	PF	71	68	2,120	405	114	45	39	678	29.9	5.7	1.6	.6	.5	9.5
Tim Hardaway Jr.	SG	71	58	2,091	232	137	41	5	1,121	29.5	3.3	1.9	.6	.1	15.8
Justin Jackson	PF	65	3	1,045	154	52	15	10	360	16.1	2.4	.8	.2	.2	5.5
Seth Curry	SG	64	25	1,576	145	124	38	9	793	24.6	2.3	1.9	.6	.1	12.4
Luka Dončić	PG	61	61	2,047	573	538	62	14	1,759	33.6	9.4	8.8	1.0	.2	28.8
Kristaps Porziņģis	C	57	57	1,814	540	102	41	115	1,164	31.8	9.5	1.8	.7	2.0	20.4
Jalen Brunson	PG	57	16	1,022	134	188	22	4	466	17.9	2.4	3.3	.4	.1	8.2
Boban Marjanović	C	44	5	422	197	20	8	10	289	9.6	4.5	.5	.2	.2	6.6
Dwight Powell	C	40	37	1,061	227	59	34	22	376	26.5	5.7	1.5	.9	.6	9.4
J. J. Barea	PG	29	6	450	53	112	5	2	222	15.5	1.8	3.9	.2	.1	7.7
Courtney Lee	SG	24	9	345	32	12	18	6	107	14.4	1.3	.5	.8	.3	4.5
Ryan Broekhoff	SF	17	1	180	43	11	5	4	71	10.6	2.5	.6	.3	.2	4.2
Willie Cauley-Stein^{†}	C	13	2	157	60	10	4	11	67	12.1	4.6	.8	.3	.8	5.2
Michael Kidd-Gilchrist^{†}	PF	13	0	121	32	4	2	3	12	9.3	2.5	.3	.2	.2	.9
Antonius Cleveland	SG	11	0	46	7	1	1	3	11	4.2	.6	.1	.1	.3	1.0
Trey Burke^{†}	PG	8	1	191	15	30	9	1	96	23.9	1.9	3.8	1.1	.1	12.0
Josh Reaves	SF	4	0	28	3	3	0	0	8	7.0	.8	.8	.0	.0	2.0

- ^{†} Denotes player spent time with another team in the season. Stats reflect time with the Mavericks only.

=== Playoffs ===
Player	POS	GP	GS	MP	REB	AST	STL	BLK	PTS	MPG	RPG	APG	SPG	BPG	PPG
Luka Dončić	PG	6	6	215	59	52	7	3	186	35.8	9.8	8.7	1.2	.5	31.0
Tim Hardaway Jr.	SG	6	6	204	21	11	2	0	107	34.0	3.5	1.8	.3	.0	17.8
Maxi Kleber	PF	6	6	203	39	9	2	7	40	33.8	6.5	1.5	.3	1.2	6.7
Dorian Finney-Smith	PF	6	6	191	34	19	7	3	61	31.8	5.7	3.2	1.2	.5	10.2
Trey Burke	PG	6	3	156	19	12	8	2	74	26.0	3.2	2.0	1.3	.3	12.3
Seth Curry	SG	6	0	173	11	8	6	0	77	28.8	1.8	1.3	1.0	.0	12.8
Boban Marjanović	C	6	0	82	35	5	0	2	41	13.7	5.8	.8	.0	.3	6.8
Michael Kidd-Gilchrist	PF	6	0	55	6	3	1	1	14	9.2	1.0	.5	.2	.2	2.3
Delon Wright	PG	4	0	53	3	7	5	0	16	13.3	.8	1.8	1.3	.0	4.0
Kristaps Porziņģis	C	3	3	94	26	2	0	3	71	31.3	8.7	.7	.0	1.0	23.7
Justin Jackson	PF	3	0	16	3	0	0	0	4	5.3	1.0	.0	.0	.0	1.3
Antonius Cleveland	SG	2	0	9	1	0	1	0	4	4.5	.5	.0	.5	.0	2.0
Josh Reaves	SF	2	0	9	2	1	0	1	4	4.5	1.0	.5	.0	.5	2.0
J. J. Barea	PG	1	0	5	0	0	0	0	3	5.0	.0	.0	.0	.0	3.0

== Awards ==
Player	Award	Date awarded
Luka Dončić	Player of the Week	November 18–24
Luka Dončić	Player of the Month	October/November
Luka Dončić	All-Star	January 23, 2020
Luka Dončić	All-NBA First Team	September 16, 2020
Kristaps Porziņģis	Player of the Week	February 24 – March 1

== Transactions ==
=== Trades ===
June 26, 2019	To Dallas Mavericks Draft rights to Isaiah Roby; Two future second-round draft picks	To Detroit Pistons Draft rights to Deividas Sirvydis
July 8, 2019	To Dallas Mavericks Delon Wright	To Memphis Grizzlies Two future second-round draft picks
January 24, 2020	To Dallas Mavericks Justin Patton	To Oklahoma City Thunder Isaiah Roby
January 24, 2020	To Dallas Mavericks Willie Cauley-Stein	To Golden State Warriors 2020 second-round draft pick

=== Free agents ===
==== Re-signed ====
Player	Signed
Dwight Powell	July 6, 2019
Maxi Kleber	July 10, 2019
Dorian Finney-Smith	July 11, 2019
Kristaps Porziņģis	July 12, 2019
J. J. Barea	August 19, 2019

==== Additions ====
Player	Signed	Former team
Seth Curry	July 10, 2019	Portland Trail Blazers
Boban Marjanović	July 23, 2019	Philadelphia 76ers
Antonius Cleveland	July 25, 2019	Santa Cruz Warriors
Dakota Mathias	July 26, 2019	(Spain) Divina Seguros Joventut
Josh Reaves	July 29, 2019	Penn State
Aric Holman	September 3, 2019	Los Angeles Lakers
Yudai Baba	September 19, 2019	Alvark Tokyo
Chad Brown	October 17, 2019	University of Central Florida
Michael Kidd-Gilchrist	February 11, 2020	Charlotte Hornets
Trey Burke	July 1, 2020	Philadelphia 76ers

==== Subtractions ====
Player	Reason left	New team
Kostas Antetokounmpo	Waived	Los Angeles Lakers
Trey Burke	Free agent	Philadelphia 76ers
Daryl Macon	Waived	Miami Heat
Salah Mejri	Free agent	(China) Liaoning Flying Leopards
Yudai Baba	Waived	Texas Legends
Aric Holman	Waived	Texas Legends
Dakota Mathias	Waived	Texas Legends
Chad Brown	Waived	Texas Legends
Justin Patton	Waived	
Ryan Broekhoff	Waived	
