= 2019–20 Detroit Pistons season =

- Head coach: Dwane Casey
- General manager: Ed Stefanski (interim)
- Owners: Tom Gores
- Arena: Little Caesars Arena

Results
- Record: 20–46 (.303)
- Place: Division: 4th (Central); Conference: 13th (Eastern)
- Playoff finish: Did not qualify
- Stats at Basketball Reference

Local media
- Television: Fox Sports Detroit
- Radio: WXYT

The 2019–20 Detroit Pistons season was the 79th season of the franchise, the 72nd in the National Basketball Association (NBA), and the third in Midtown Detroit. This was the second season under head coach Dwane Casey.

On March 11, 2020, the season was suspended by the NBA due to the COVID-19 pandemic after it was reported Rudy Gobert tested positive. On June 4, 2020, the season came to an end for the Pistons when the NBA Board of Governors approved a plan that would restart the season with 22 teams returning to play in the NBA Bubble on July 31, 2020, which was approved by the National Basketball Players Association the next day.

== Draft picks ==
Round	Pick	Player	Position	Nationality	College / Team
1	15	Sekou Doumbouya	PF	France	Limoges CSP
2	45	Isaiah Roby	SF	United States	Nebraska

The Pistons held two first-round picks and one second-round pick entering the draft. The 30th pick was traded to the Cleveland Cavaliers, while the 45th pick was traded to the Dallas Mavericks in exchange for the 37th pick. They acquired the 57th pick from the Philadelphia 76ers.

== Roster ==
2019–20 Detroit Pistons roster
Players

Pos.	No.	Player	Height	Weight	DOB	From
PG	18	Jordan Bone (TW)	6 ft 2 in (1.88 m)	180 lb (82 kg)	1997–11–05	Tennessee
SG	6	Bruce Brown	6 ft 4 in (1.93 m)	202 lb (92 kg)	1996–08–15	Miami (FL)
PF	45	Sekou Doumbouya	6 ft 8 in (2.03 m)	235 lb (107 kg)	2000–12–23	France
PG	9	Langston Galloway	6 ft 1 in (1.85 m)	200 lb (91 kg)	1991–12–09	Saint Joseph's
PF	23	Blake Griffin (injured)	6 ft 10 in (2.08 m)	250 lb (113 kg)	1989–03–16	Oklahoma
C	31	John Henson	6 ft 11 in (2.11 m)	219 lb (99 kg)	1990–12–28	North Carolina
SG	5	Luke Kennard	6 ft 5 in (1.96 m)	206 lb (93 kg)	1996–06–24	Duke
SF	14	Louis King (TW)	6 ft 7 in (2.01 m)	205 lb (93 kg)	1999–04–06	Oregon
PG	20	Brandon Knight	6 ft 2 in (1.88 m)	182 lb (83 kg)	1991–12–02	Kentucky
C	7	Thon Maker	7 ft 1 in (2.16 m)	221 lb (100 kg)	1997–02–25	Orangeville Prep (CAN)
SG	52	Jordan McRae	6 ft 5 in (1.96 m)	179 lb (81 kg)	1991–03–28	Tennessee
SG	19	Sviatoslav Mykhailiuk	6 ft 8 in (2.03 m)	205 lb (93 kg)	1997–06–10	Kansas
C	—	Justin Patton	7 ft 0 in (2.13 m)	251 lb (114 kg)	1997–06–14	Creighton
PG	25	Derrick Rose (injured)	6 ft 2 in (1.88 m)	200 lb (91 kg)	1988–10–04	Memphis
SF	17	Tony Snell	6 ft 7 in (2.01 m)	213 lb (97 kg)	1991–11–10	New Mexico
PG	13	Khyri Thomas	6 ft 3 in (1.91 m)	210 lb (95 kg)	1996–05–08	Creighton
PF	35	Christian Wood	6 ft 11 in (2.11 m)	220 lb (100 kg)	1995–09–27	UNLV

Coaches
Head coach
- Dwane Casey
Assistant(s)
- Tim Grgurich
- Sidney Lowe
- Micah Nori
- Sean Sweeney

Legend
- (DP) Unsigned draft pick
- (FA) Free agent
- (S) Suspended
- (GL) On assignment to G League affiliate
- (TW) Two-way affiliate player
- Injured

Roster
Updated: 2020–06–26

== Standings ==
=== Division ===
Central Division	W	L	PCT	GB	Home	Road	Div	GP
z – Milwaukee Bucks	56	17	.767	–	30‍–‍5	26‍–‍12	13–1	73
x – Indiana Pacers	45	28	.616	11.0	25‍–‍11	20‍–‍17	8–7	73
Chicago Bulls	22	43	.338	30.0	14‍–‍20	8‍–‍23	7–9	65
Detroit Pistons	20	46	.303	32.5	11‍–‍22	9‍–‍24	5–10	66
Cleveland Cavaliers	19	46	.292	33.0	11‍–‍25	8‍–‍21	4–10	65

=== Conference ===
Eastern Conference
#	Team	W	L	PCT	GB	GP
1	z – Milwaukee Bucks *	56	17	.767	–	73
2	y – Toronto Raptors *	53	19	.736	2.5	72
3	x – Boston Celtics	48	24	.667	7.5	72
4	x – Indiana Pacers	45	28	.616	11.0	73
5	y – Miami Heat *	44	29	.603	12.0	73
6	x – Philadelphia 76ers	43	30	.589	13.0	73
7	x – Brooklyn Nets	35	37	.486	20.5	72
8	x – Orlando Magic	33	40	.452	23.0	73
9	Washington Wizards	25	47	.347	30.5	72
10	Charlotte Hornets	23	42	.354	29.0	65
11	Chicago Bulls	22	43	.338	30.0	65
12	New York Knicks	21	45	.318	31.5	66
13	Detroit Pistons	20	46	.303	32.5	66
14	Atlanta Hawks	20	47	.299	33.0	67
15	Cleveland Cavaliers	19	46	.292	33.0	65

== Game log ==
=== Preseason ===
2019 preseason game log
Total: 3–2 (Home: 2–1; Road: 1–1)
Preseason: 3–2 (home: 2–1; road: 1–1)

Game	Date	Team	Score	High points	High rebounds	High assists	Location Attendance	Record
1	October 7	Orlando	L 91–115	Christian Wood (19)	Andre Drummond (9)	Blake Griffin (5)	Little Caesars Arena; 7,411	0–1
2	October 9	Dallas	W 124–117	Luke Kennard (19)	Andre Drummond (9)	Jackson & Rose (5)	Little Caesars Arena; 9,695	1–1
3	October 11	Cleveland	W 109–105	Brown, Drummond, Jackson & Rose (15)	Thon Maker (10)	Bruce Brown Jr. (7)	Little Caesars Arena; 13,925	2–1
4	October 15	@ Philadelphia	L 86–106	Christian Wood (19)	Maker & Wood (10)	Thon Maker (5)	Wells Fargo Center; 14,317	2–2
5	October 16	@ Charlotte	W 116–110	Langston Galloway (18)	Andre Drummond (12)	Tim Frazier (15)	Spectrum Center; 7,746	3–2

2019–20 season schedule

=== Regular season ===
2019–20 game log
Total: 20–46 (Home: 11–22; Road: 9–24)
October: 2–3 (home: 1–2; road: 1–1)

Game	Date	Team	Score	High points	High rebounds	High assists	Location Attendance	Record
1	October 23	@ Indiana	W 119–110	Andre Drummond (32)	Andre Drummond (23)	Derrick Rose (9)	Bankers Life Fieldhouse; 17,923	1–0
2	October 24	Atlanta	L 100–117	Derrick Rose (27)	Andre Drummond (12)	Jackson, Rose, Galloway & Kennard (3)	Little Caesars Arena; 20,332	1–1
3	October 26	Philadelphia	L 111–117	Derrick Rose (31)	Andre Drummond (12)	Tony Snell (6)	Little Caesars Arena; 16,207	1–2
4	October 28	Indiana	W 96–94	Christian Wood (19)	Andre Drummond (18)	Tim Frazier (8)	Little Caesars Arena; 13,565	2–2
5	October 30	@ Toronto	L 113–125	Andre Drummond (21)	Andre Drummond (22)	Derrick Rose (10)	Scotiabank Arena; 19,800	2–3

November : 4–10 (home: 4–2; road: 0–8)

Game	Date	Team	Score	High points	High rebounds	High assists	Location Attendance	Record
6	November 1	@ Chicago	L 106–112	Andre Drummond (25)	Andre Drummond (23)	Derrick Rose (7)	United Center; 20,671	2–4
7	November 2	Brooklyn	W 113–109	Andre Drummond (25)	Andre Drummond (20)	Bruce Brown Jr. (7)	Little Caesars Arena; 17,222	3–4
8	November 4	@ Washington	L 99–115	Luke Kennard (24)	Andre Drummond (24)	Bruce Brown Jr. (7)	Capital One Arena; 13,052	3–5
9	November 6	New York	W 122–102	Andre Drummond (27)	Andre Drummond (12)	Drummond & Kennard (7)	Little Caesars Arena; 15,463	4–5
10	November 8	@ Indiana	L 106–112	Luke Kennard (29)	Andre Drummond (13)	Andre Drummond (8)	Bankers Life Fieldhouse; 15,544	4–6
11	November 11	Minnesota	L 114–120	Luke Kennard (25)	Andre Drummond (12)	Griffin & Rose (5)	Little Caesars Arena; 12,526	4–7
12	November 12	@ Miami	L 108–117	Luke Kennard (22)	Andre Drummond (9)	Bruce Brown Jr. (11)	American Airlines Arena; 19,600	4–8
13	November 15	@ Charlotte	L 106–109	Langston Galloway (32)	Andre Drummond (20)	Bruce Brown Jr. (7)	Spectrum Center; 16,778	4–9
14	November 20	@ Chicago	L 89–109	Derrick Rose (18)	Andre Drummond (14)	Bruce Brown Jr. (6)	United Center; 18,119	4–10
15	November 22	Atlanta	W 128–103	Blake Griffin (24)	Andre Drummond (15)	Luke Kennard (9)	Little Caesars Arena; 15,399	5–10
16	November 23	@ Milwaukee	L 90–104	Derrick Rose (20)	Andre Drummond (17)	Derrick Rose (6)	Fiserv Forum; 17,585	5–11
17	November 25	Orlando	W 103–88	Luke Kennard (20)	Andre Drummond (18)	Luke Kennard (7)	Little Caesars Arena; 14,695	6–11
18	November 27	@ Charlotte	L 101–102	Blake Griffin (26)	Andre Drummond (21)	Derrick Rose (8)	Spectrum Center; 15,535	6–12
19	November 29	Charlotte	L 107–110	Derrick Rose (23)	Andre Drummond (19)	Bruce Brown Jr. (5)	Little Caesars Arena; 15,006	6–13

December : 6–9 (home: 3–6; road: 3–3)

Game	Date	Team	Score	High points	High rebounds	High assists	Location Attendance	Record
20	December 1	San Antonio	W 132–98	Christian Wood (28)	Andre Drummond (16)	Derrick Rose (10)	Little Caesars Arena; 14,270	7–13
21	December 3	@ Cleveland	W 127–94	Blake Griffin (24)	Andre Drummond (14)	Derrick Rose (9)	Rocket Mortgage FieldHouse; 17,504	8–13
22	December 4	Milwaukee	L 103–127	Andre Drummond (23)	Andre Drummond (14)	Drummond & Rose (5)	Little Caesars Arena; 15,742	8–14
23	December 6	Indiana	W 108–101	Drummond & Griffin (25)	Andre Drummond (22)	Bruce Brown Jr. (6)	Little Caesars Arena; 14,894	9–14
24	December 9	@ New Orleans	W 105–103	Derrick Rose (21)	Andre Drummond (10)	Derrick Rose (7)	Smoothie King Center; 13,694	10–14
25	December 12	Dallas	L 111–122	Andre Drummond (23)	Andre Drummond (15)	Blake Griffin (5)	Mexico City Arena; 20,064	10–15
26	December 14	@ Houston	W 115–107	Luke Kennard (22)	Christian Wood (13)	Derrick Rose (12)	Toyota Center; 18,055	11–15
27	December 16	Washington	L 119–133	Morris & Rose (22)	Brown Jr., Kennard, Rose & Wood (6)	Derrick Rose (8)	Little Caesars Arena; 14,632	11–16
28	December 18	Toronto	L 99–112	Andre Drummond (22)	Andre Drummond (18)	Derrick Rose (5)	Little Caesars Arena; 15,319	11–17
29	December 20	@ Boston	L 93–114	Thon Maker (15)	Andre Drummond (11)	Brown & Frazier (5)	TD Garden; 19,156	11–18
30	December 21	Chicago	L 107–119	Markieff Morris (23)	Andre Drummond (14)	Tim Frazier (9)	Little Caesars Arena; 15,948	11–19
31	December 23	Philadelphia	L 109–125	Andre Drummond (27)	Andre Drummond (9)	Derrick Rose (7)	Little Caesars Arena; 16,476	11–20
32	December 26	Washington	W 132–102	Christian Wood (22)	Blake Griffin (11)	Frazier & Rose (6)	Little Caesars Arena; 17,188	12–20
33	December 28	@ San Antonio	L 109–136	Derrick Rose (24)	Andre Drummond (18)	Frazier & Rose (4)	AT&T Center; 18,524	12–21
34	December 30	@ Utah	L 81–104	Derrick Rose (20)	Andre Drummond (13)	Derrick Rose (4)	Vivint Smart Home Arena; 18,306	12–22

January : 5–11 (home: 1–7; road: 4–4)

Game	Date	Team	Score	High points	High rebounds	High assists	Location Attendance	Record
35	January 2	@ L. A. Clippers	L 112–126	Bruce Brown Jr. (15)	Andre Drummond (12)	Brown & Rose (6)	Staples Center; 19,068	12–23
36	January 4	@ Golden State	W 111–104	Derrick Rose (22)	Andre Drummond (18)	Tim Frazier (5)	Chase Center; 18,064	13–23
37	January 5	@ L. A. Lakers	L 99–106	Derrick Rose (28)	Andre Drummond (18)	Brown & Rose (5)	Staples Center; 18,997	13–24
38	January 7	@ Cleveland	W 115–113	Derrick Rose (24)	Andre Drummond (20)	Brown & Rose (7)	Rocket Mortgage FieldHouse; 17,274	14–24
39	January 9	Cleveland	L 112–115 (OT)	Andre Drummond (28)	Andre Drummond (23)	Bruce Brown Jr. (8)	Little Caesars Arena; 13,445	14–25
40	January 11	Chicago	L 99–108	Derrick Rose (20)	Christian Wood (14)	Derrick Rose (7)	Little Caesars Arena; 15,951	14–26
41	January 13	New Orleans	L 110–117 (OT)	Derrick Rose (23)	Andre Drummond (10)	Derrick Rose (8)	Little Caesars Arena; 13,780	14–27
42	January 15	@ Boston	W 116–103	Sekou Doumbouya (24)	Andre Drummond (13)	Andre Drummond (7)	TD Garden; 19,156	15–27
43	January 18	@ Atlanta	W 136–103	Derrick Rose (27)	Andre Drummond (17)	Derrick Rose (9)	State Farm Arena; 17,056	16–27
44	January 20	@ Washington	L 100–106	Derrick Rose (21)	Andre Drummond (16)	Brown & Galloway (4)	Capital One Arena; 17,305	16–28
45	January 22	Sacramento	W 127–106	Christian Wood (23)	Markieff Morris (11)	Derrick Rose (11)	Little Caesars Arena; 13,972	17–28
46	January 24	Memphis	L 112–125	Derrick Rose (22)	Thon Maker (8)	Derrick Rose (8)	Little Caesars Arena; 14,583	17–29
47	January 25	Brooklyn	L 111–121 (OT)	Derrick Rose (27)	Andre Drummond (21)	Derrick Rose (6)	Little Caesars Arena; 15,890	17–30
48	January 27	Cleveland	L 100–115	Reggie Jackson (16)	Andre Drummond (8)	Bruce Brown Jr. (6)	Little Caesars Arena; 12,597	17–31
49	January 29	@ Brooklyn	L 115–125	Reggie Jackson (23)	Andre Drummond (13)	Rose & Jackson (5)	Barclays Center; 14,275	17–32
50	January 31	Toronto	L 92–105	Derrick Rose (21)	Andre Drummond (20)	Tony Snell (4)	Little Caesars Arena; 17,356	17–33

February : 3–8 (home: 2–3; road: 1–5)

Game	Date	Team	Score	High points	High rebounds	High assists	Location Attendance	Record
51	February 2	Denver	W 128–123 (OT)	Andre Drummond (21)	Andre Drummond (17)	Bruce Brown Jr. (8)	Little Caesars Arena; 15,488	18–33
52	February 3	@ Memphis	L 82–96	Andre Drummond (25)	Andre Drummond (18)	Brown, Drummond, Jackson & Snell (4)	FedExForum; 14,597	18–34
53	February 5	Phoenix	W 116–108	Andre Drummond (31)	Andre Drummond (19)	Reggie Jackson (9)	Little Caesars Arena; 13,707	19–34
54	February 7	@ Oklahoma City	L 101–108	Reggie Jackson (28)	Christian Wood (12)	Snell & Wood (5)	Chesapeake Energy Arena; 18,203	19–35
55	February 8	New York	L 92–95	Reggie Jackson (20)	Christian Wood (11)	Reggie Jackson (9)	Little Caesars Arena; 15,980	19–36
56	February 10	Charlotte	L 76–87	Thon Maker (12)	Thon Maker (12)	Bruce Brown Jr. (5)	Little Caesars Arena; 13,941	19–37
57	February 12	@ Orlando	L 112–116 (OT)	Christian Wood (26)	Christian Wood (12)	Reggie Jackson (11)	Amway Center; 16,607	19–38
All-Star Break
58	February 20	Milwaukee	L 106–126	Christian Wood (18)	Christian Wood (11)	Bruce Brown Jr. (7)	Little Caesars Arena; 16,097	19–39
59	February 23	@ Portland	L 104–107	Christian Wood (26)	Bruce Brown Jr. (10)	Langston Galloway (4)	Moda Center; 19,393	19–40
60	February 25	@ Denver	L 98–115	Rose & Wood (20)	Christian Wood (10)	Tony Snell (7)	Pepsi Center; 19,143	19–41
61	February 28	@ Phoenix	W 113–111	Derrick Rose (31)	Christian Wood (9)	Christian Wood (5)	Talking Stick Resort Arena; 17,142	20–41

March: 0–5 (home: 0–2; road: 0–3)

Game	Date	Team	Score	High points	High rebounds	High assists	Location Attendance	Record
62	March 1	@ Sacramento	L 100–106	Christian Wood (20)	Christian Wood (12)	Brandon Knight (7)	Golden 1 Center; 17,499	20–42
63	March 4	Oklahoma City	L 107–114	Christian Wood (29)	Christian Wood (10)	Brandon Knight (7)	Little Caesars Arena; 15,138	20–43
64	March 7	Utah	L 105–111	Christian Wood (30)	Christian Wood (11)	Bruce Brown Jr. (7)	Little Caesars Arena; 16,590	20–44
65	March 8	@ New York	L 84–96	Christian Wood (22)	Christian Wood (8)	Bruce Brown Jr. (6)	Madison Square Garden; 18,361	20–45
66	March 11	@ Philadelphia	L 106–124	Christian Wood (32)	Wood & McRae (7)	Brandon Knight (6)	Wells Fargo Center; 20,172	20–46

Cancelled games

Game	Date	Team	Score	High points	High rebounds	High assists	Location Attendance	Record
67	March 14	@ Toronto					Scotiabank Arena	
68	March 17	Orlando					Little Caesars Arena	
69	March 20	Golden State					Little Caesars Arena	
70	March 22	LA Lakers					Little Caesars Arena	
71	March 23	@ Milwaukee					Fiserv Forum	
72	March 25	Portland					Little Caesars Arena	
73	March 27	LA Clippers					Little Caesars Arena	
74	March 29	Houston					Little Caesars Arena	
75	April 1	@ Brooklyn					Barclays Center	
76	April 3	Miami					Little Caesars Arena	
77	April 5	@ Minnesota					Target Center	
78	April 7	@ Atlanta					State Farm Arena	
79	April 9	@ Miami					American Airlines Arena	
80	April 11	@ Dallas					American Airlines Center	
81	April 13	Boston					Little Caesars Arena	
82	April 14	@ New York					Madison Square Garden	

2019–20 season schedule

== Player statistics ==
Legend
GP	Games played	GS	Games started	MPG	Minutes per game
FG%	Field-goal percentage	3P%	3-point field-goal percentage	FT%	Free-throw percentage
RPG	Rebounds per game	APG	Assists per game	SPG	Steals per game
BPG	Blocks per game	PPG	Points per game

=== Regular season ===
Detroit Pistons statistics
Player	GP	GS	MPG	FG%	3P%	FT%	RPG	APG	SPG	BPG	PPG
Langston Galloway	66	6	25.8	.435	.399	.859	2.3	1.5	.7	.2	10.3
Christian Wood	62	12	21.4	.567	.386	.744	6.3	1.0	.5	.9	13.1
Thon Maker	60	14	12.9	.482	.344	.664	2.8	.7	.4	.7	4.7
Tony Snell	59	57	27.8	.445	.402	1.000	1.9	2.2	.5	.3	8.0
Bruce Brown	58	43	28.2	.443	.344	.739	4.7	4.0	1.1	.5	8.9
Sviatoslav Mykhailiuk	56	27	22.6	.410	.404	.814	1.9	1.9	.7	.1	9.0
Derrick Rose	50	15	26.0	.490	.306	.871	2.4	5.6	.8	.3	18.1
Andre Drummond^{†}	49	48	33.8	.530	.048	.584	15.8	2.8	2.0	1.7	17.8
Markieff Morris^{†}	44	16	22.5	.450	.397	.772	3.9	1.6	.6	.3	11.0
Sekou Doumbouya	38	19	19.8	.390	.286	.674	3.1	.5	.5	.2	6.4
Luke Kennard	28	25	32.9	.442	.399	.893	3.5	4.1	.4	.2	15.8
Tim Frazier	27	11	13.1	.362	.333	.792	1.2	3.4	.5	.1	3.6
Blake Griffin	18	18	28.4	.352	.243	.776	4.7	3.3	.4	.4	15.5
Reggie Jackson^{†}	14	10	27.2	.384	.378	.788	2.9	5.1	.6	.1	14.9
John Henson^{†}	11	6	17.1	.667	.400	.462	4.4	1.0	.7	.9	6.9
Louis King	10	0	6.2	.381	.364	.000	1.0	.5	.2	.0	2.0
Jordan Bone	10	0	5.3	.250	.200		.4	.8	.1	.0	1.2
Brandon Knight^{†}	9	3	24.6	.383	.388	.762	2.3	4.2	.6	.1	11.6
Khyri Thomas	8	0	7.6	.294	.357	.500	.1	.4	.4	.0	2.1
Jordan McRae^{†}	4	0	24.5	.326	.188	.727	3.8	1.8	.0	.0	11.8
Donta Hall^{†}	4	0	12.0	.250		.667	3.8	.5	.3	.3	1.5
Derrick Walton^{†}	3	0	8.7	.333	.333		.3	1.7	1.0	.0	1.0

- ^{†} Denotes player spent time with another team in the season. Stats reflect time with the Pistons only.

== Transactions ==
=== Overview ===
Players Added

Via draft

- Sekou Doumbouya

Via trade

- Jordan Bone
- John Henson
- Brandon Knight
- Deividas Sirvydis
- Tony Snell

Via free agency

- Tim Frazier
- Donta Hall
- Joe Johnson
- Louis King
- Jordan McRae
- Markieff Morris
- Derrick Rose
- Derrick Walton
- Christian Wood
Players Lost

Via trade

- Andre Drummond
- Jon Leuer

Via free agency

- Wayne Ellington
- Kalin Lucas
- Glenn Robinson III
- Ish Smith
- Isaiah Whitehead

Via retirement

- José Calderón
- Zaza Pachulia

Waived

- Tim Frazier
- Reggie Jackson
- Joe Johnson
- Markieff Morris
- Derrick Walton

=== Trades ===
June 21, 2019	To Detroit Pistons Tony Snell; Draft rights to Kevin Porter Jr.	To Milwaukee Bucks Jon Leuer
June 21, 2019	To Detroit Pistons 2020 second-round draft pick (from Utah via Cleveland); 2021 second-round draft pick (from Portland via Cleveland); 2023 second-round draft pick (from Portland via Cleveland); 2024 protected second-round draft pick (from Miami via Cleveland); Cash considerations	To Cleveland Cavaliers Draft rights to Kevin Porter Jr. (from Milwaukee via Detroit)
June 27, 2019	To Detroit Pistons Draft rights to Deividas Sirvydis	To Dallas Mavericks Draft rights to Isaiah Roby; 2020 second-round draft pick (from Utah via Cleveland and Detroit); 2021 second-round draft pick (from Portland via Cleveland and Detroit)
July 8, 2019	To Detroit Pistons Draft rights to Jordan Bone (from New Orleans via Atlanta and Philadelphia)	To Philadelphia 76ers 2024 protected second-round draft pick (from Miami via Cleveland and Detroit); Cash considerations
February 6, 2020	To Detroit Pistons John Henson; Brandon Knight; 2023 second-round draft pick	To Cleveland Cavaliers Andre Drummond

=== Free agency ===
==== Additions ====
Date	Player	Contract terms	Former team	Ref.
July 4	Louis King	Two-way contract	Oregon Ducks	
July 7	Derrick Rose	2-year contract worth $15 million	Minnesota Timberwolves	
July 17	Christian Wood		New Orleans Pelicans	
February 22	Donta Hall	10-day contract	Grand Rapids Drive	
March 4	Jordan McRae		Denver Nuggets	

==== Subtractions ====
Date	Player	Reason	New team	Ref.
July 9	Wayne Ellington	Unrestricted free agent	New York Knicks	
July 9	Ish Smith	Unrestricted free agent	Washington Wizards	
July 10	Glenn Robinson III	Unrestricted free agent	Golden State Warriors	
August 29	Zaza Pachulia	Retired	—N/a	
October 10	Isaiah Whitehead	Unrestricted free agent	(Kazakhstan) BC Astana	
October 21	Joe Johnson	Waived		
November 4	José Calderón	Retired	—N/a	
February 6	Tim Frazier	Waived		
February 15	Kalin Lucas	Unrestricted free agent	(Serbia) Crvena zvezda	
February 18	Reggie Jackson	Waived	Los Angeles Clippers	
February 21	Markieff Morris	Waived	Los Angeles Lakers	
March 4	Derrick Walton	Waived		
