= Bruce Brown (basketball) =

American basketball player (born 1996)

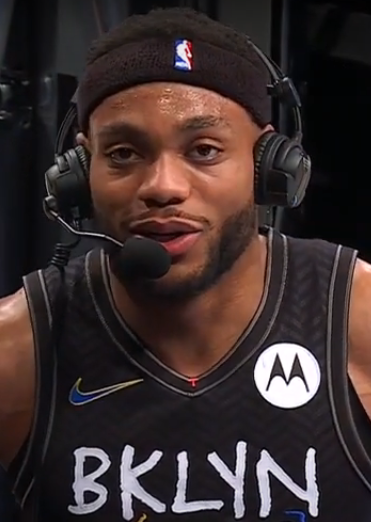
- Brown with the Brooklyn Nets in 2021

Free agent
- Position: Small forward / shooting guard

Personal information
- Born: August 15, 1996 (age 30) Boston, Massachusetts, U.S.
- Listed height: 6 ft 4 in (1.93 m)
- Listed weight: 202 lb (92 kg)

Career information
- High school: Wakefield (Wakefield, Massachusetts); Vermont Academy (Saxtons River, Vermont)
- College: Miami (Florida) (2016–2018)
- NBA draft: 2018: 2nd round, 42nd overall pick
- Drafted by: Detroit Pistons
- Playing career: 2018–present

Career history
- 2018–2020: Detroit Pistons
- 2020–2022: Brooklyn Nets
- 2022–2023: Denver Nuggets
- 2023–2024: Indiana Pacers
- 2024–2025: Toronto Raptors
- 2025: New Orleans Pelicans
- 2025–2026: Denver Nuggets

Career highlights
- NBA champion (2023)
- Stats at NBA.com
- Stats at Basketball Reference

Bruce Brown Jr. (born August 15, 1996) is an American professional basketball player who last played for the Denver Nuggets of the National Basketball Association (NBA). He played college basketball for the Miami Hurricanes and was selected 42nd overall by the Detroit Pistons in the 2018 NBA draft. He has also played for the Brooklyn Nets, Denver Nuggets, Indiana Pacers, Toronto Raptors, and New Orleans Pelicans. In 2023, he was a key contributor of the Nuggets' championship run off the bench. Despite being undersized, Brown plays the small forward and both guard positions.

== High school career ==
Brown played basketball and football for Wakefield Memorial High School in Wakefield, Massachusetts. For his junior season, he transferred to Vermont Academy in Saxtons River, Vermont. As a senior, Brown led his team to the New England Preparatory School Athletic Council Class AA title and was named tournament most valuable player. He was selected to play in the 2016 Jordan Brand Classic. Brown was considered a five-star recruit by 247Sports and ESPN and a four-star recruit by Rivals. Brown was ranked no. 26 overall recruit and fifth-best shooting guard in the 2016 high school class. On November 18, 2015, he committed to play college basketball for the Miami Hurricanes over an offer from Indiana, among others.

== College career ==
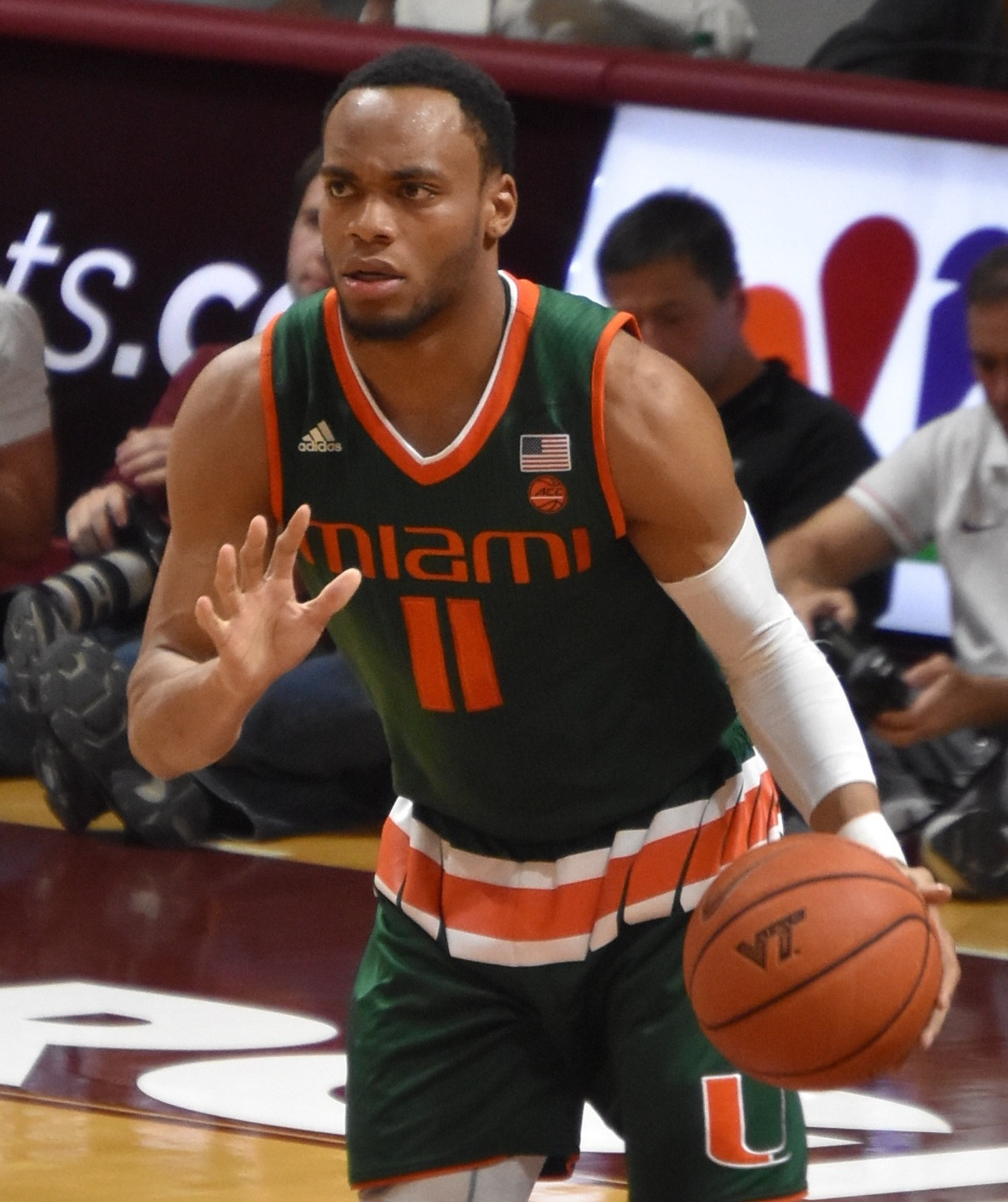
Brown with the Miami Hurricanes in 2017

As a sophomore with the Miami Hurricanes, Brown averaged 11.4 points, 7.1 rebounds and four assists per game and shot 27 percent from three-point range. He only played 19 games and missed the postseason with a left foot injury that required surgery. After the season Brown declared for the 2018 NBA draft but did not hire an agent, thereby allowing for the possibility of returning to college. He ultimately decided to stay in the draft.

== Professional career ==
=== Detroit Pistons (2018–2020) ===
On June 21, 2018, Brown was drafted 42nd overall by the Detroit Pistons in the 2018 NBA draft. He made his NBA debut on October 17, 2018, against the Brooklyn Nets, scoring no points with two rebounds and an assist in 19 minutes of action. On November 2, 2019, he posted 22 points and seven assists, with no turnovers, in a 113–109 win over the Nets. On February 2, 2020, Brown recorded 19 points, 10 rebounds and eight assists in a 128–123 overtime victory over the Denver Nuggets.

=== Brooklyn Nets (2020–2022) ===
On November 19, 2020, Brown was traded to the Brooklyn Nets in a three-team trade.

On February 23, 2021, Brown scored a career-high 29 points in the Nets' 127–118 win against the Sacramento Kings.

On April 23, 2022, he scored a team leading 26 points for the Nets in a losing effort against the Celtics in the first round of the NBA playoffs. The Nets fell to 0–3 after that game. His performance in games 2 and 3 were notably impressive, as he scored 23 or more points in both contests, despite eclipsing 20 points only four times throughout the entire regular season.

=== Denver Nuggets (2022–2023) ===
On July 7, 2022, Brown signed with the Denver Nuggets. He signed a two-year contract worth $13 million, with a player option on the second year. The Nets had chosen not to match the Nuggets' taxpayer mid-level exception offer for Brown and acquired Royce O'Neale as a replacement instead. On November 23, Brown recorded a triple-double with 17 points, 13 rebounds and 10 assists during a win against the Oklahoma City Thunder.

In 2023, Brown and the Nuggets reached the NBA Finals where they defeated the Miami Heat in five games to give Brown his first NBA championship. In game 4 of the series, Brown scored a pivotal 21 points, including 11 in the fourth quarter, to help Denver open up a 3–1 series lead with a 108–95 victory over the Heat. In Game 5, Brown scored the winning points on a layup off an offensive rebound with just over 90 seconds left in the game, and hit two free throws to make it a two-possession game with less than 30 seconds remaining as the Nuggets defeated Miami 94–89 to win their first championship in franchise history after a 47-year drought.

=== Indiana Pacers (2023–2024) ===
On July 6, 2023, Brown signed a two-year, $45 million contract with the Indiana Pacers. He saw an increased role in Indiana, earning a starting position as the highest-paid Pacer for the 2023–24 season. On October 25, Brown impressed in his Pacers debut, scoring a team-high 24 points with a career-high 6-of-8 three-point shooting performance, along with three rebounds and a steal in a 143–120 win over the Washington Wizards. He started 33 contests for Indiana, recording averages of 12.1 points, 4.7 rebounds, and 3.0 assists.

=== Toronto Raptors (2024–2025) ===
On January 17, 2024, the Pacers traded Brown, along with Jordan Nwora, Kira Lewis Jr. and three first-round draft picks to the Toronto Raptors in exchange for Pascal Siakam. He made 34 appearances (including 11 starts) for Toronto during the remainder of the year, averaging 9.6 points, 3.8 rebounds, and 2.7 assists.

Brown played in 18 contests for the Raptors in the 2024–25 NBA season, recording averages of 8.4 points, 3.8 rebounds, and 1.6 assists.

=== New Orleans Pelicans (2025) ===
On February 6, 2025, the Raptors traded Brown, Kelly Olynyk and multiple draft picks to the New Orleans Pelicans in exchange for Brandon Ingram. In 23 appearances (including 12 starts) for New Orleans, Brown posted averages of 8.2 points, 4.2 rebounds, and 2.4 assists.

=== Return to Denver (2025–2026) ===
On July 9, 2025, Brown signed a one-year contract with the Denver Nuggets, returning to the franchise for a second stint. Brown appeared in all 82 games (including four starts) for the Nuggets during the 2025–26 season, recording averages of 7.9 points, 3.9 rebounds, and 2.1 assists.

On September 16, 2026, Brown signed with the defending champion New York Knicks, but was subsequently waived just one month later on October 17, before the start of the season.

== Career statistics ==
Legend
GP	Games played	GS	Games started	MPG	Minutes per game
FG%	Field goal percentage	3P%	3-point field goal percentage	FT%	Free throw percentage
RPG	Rebounds per game	APG	Assists per game	SPG	Steals per game
BPG	Blocks per game	PPG	Points per game	**Bold**	Career high
†	Won an NBA championship	*	Led the league

=== NBA ===
==== Regular season ====
Year	Team	GP	GS	MPG	FG%	3P%	FT%	RPG	APG	SPG	BPG	PPG
2018–19	Detroit	74	**56**	19.6	.398	.258	.750	2.5	1.2	.5	.5	4.3
2019–20	Detroit	58	43	28.2	.443	.344	.739	4.7	**4.0**	**1.1**	.5	8.9
2020–21	Brooklyn	65	37	22.3	**.556**	.288	.735	**5.4**	1.6	.9	.4	8.8
2021–22	Brooklyn	72	45	24.6	.506	**.404**	.758	4.8	2.1	**1.1**	**.7**	9.0
2022–23^{†}	Denver	80	31	28.5	.483	.358	.758	4.1	3.4	**1.1**	.6	11.5
2023–24	Indiana	33	33	**29.7**	.475	.327	.817	4.7	3.0	**1.1**	.2	**12.1**
2023–24	Toronto	34	11	26.0	.481	.317	.833	3.8	2.7	.7	.3	9.6
2024–25	Toronto	18	0	19.6	.435	.306	**.897**	3.8	1.6	.9	.2	8.4
2024–25	New Orleans	23	12	24.7	.410	.356	.750	4.2	2.4	.7	.3	8.2
2025–26	Denver	**82***	4	24.4	.475	.385	.762	3.9	2.1	1.0	.2	7.9
Career		539	272	24.8	.476	.344	.767	4.2	2.4	.9	.5	8.7

==== Playoffs ====
Year	Team	GP	GS	MPG	FG%	3P%	FT%	RPG	APG	SPG	BPG	PPG
2019	Detroit	4	2	14.3	.357	.200	**1.000**	2.0	.5	.5	.3	3.3
2021	Brooklyn	12	**5**	23.1	.506	.182	.813	**5.1**	2.1	.7	.4	7.9
2022	Brooklyn	4	4	**34.8**	**.568**	**.429**	.800	4.8	**2.8**	1.3	**.8**	**14.0**
2023^{†}	Denver	**20**	0	26.6	.511	.316	.857	4.0	1.9	1.1	.5	12.0
2026	Denver	6	0	19.3	.441	.273	.556	2.7	1.7	**1.7**	.0	6.3
Career		46	11	24.3	.503	.306	.814	4.0	1.9	1.0	.4	9.6

=== College ===
Year	Team	GP	GS	MPG	FG%	3P%	FT%	RPG	APG	SPG	BPG	PPG
2016–17	Miami	**33**	**29**	31.9	**.459**	**.347**	**.744**	5.6	3.2	**1.5**	.5	**11.8**
2017–18	Miami	19	19	**33.7**	.415	.267	.629	**7.1**	**4.0**	1.3	**.8**	11.4
Career		52	48	32.6	.442	.316	.702	6.2	3.5	1.4	.6	11.7
