= Boban Marjanović =

Serbian basketball player (born 1988)

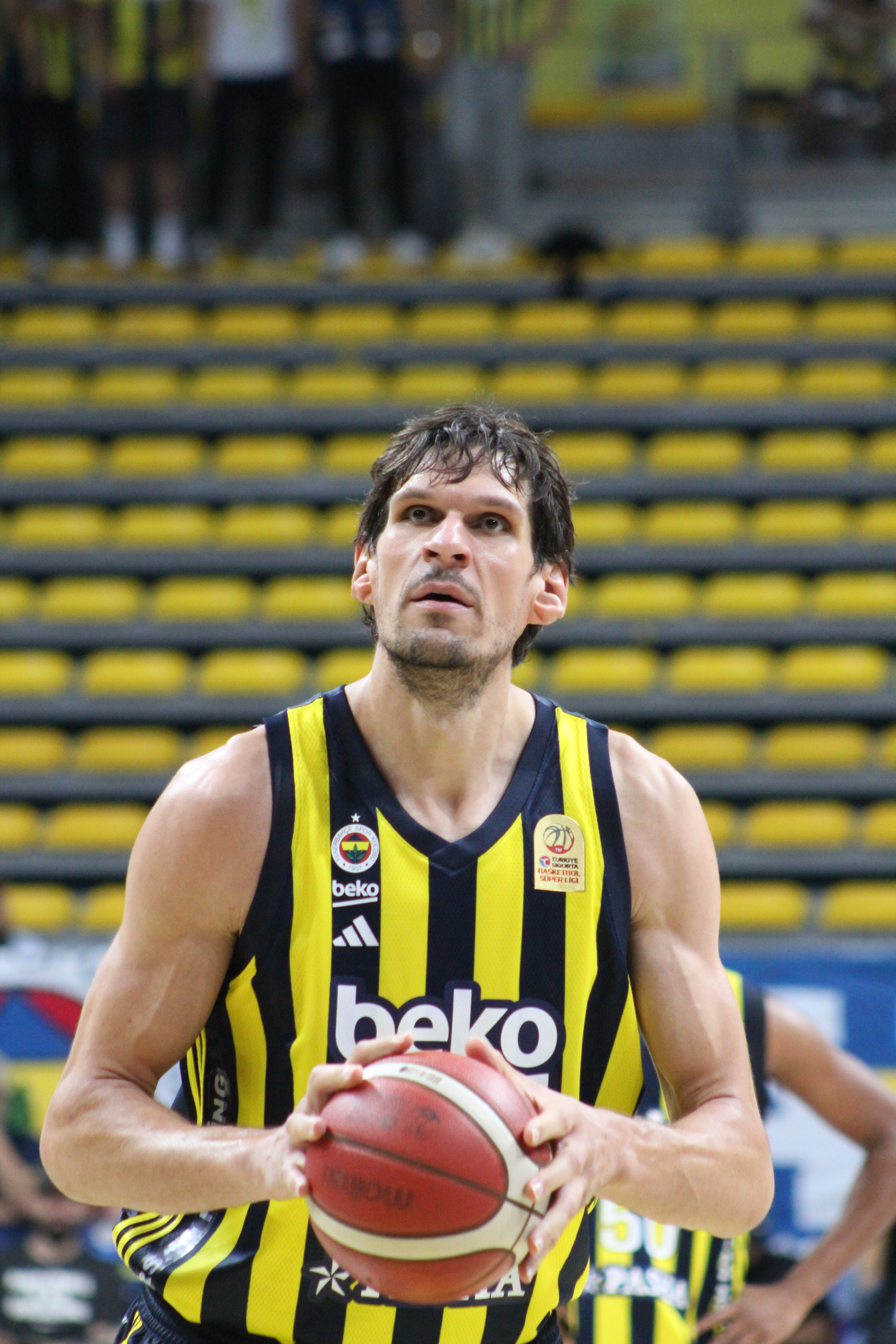
- Marjanović with Fenerbahçe Beko in 2024

Free agent
- Position: Center

Personal information
- Born: August 15, 1988 (age 38) Boljevac, SR Serbia, Yugoslavia
- Listed height: 7 ft 4 in (2.24 m)
- Listed weight: 290 lb (132 kg)

Career information
- NBA draft: 2010: undrafted
- Playing career: 2006–present

Career history
- 2006–2010: Hemofarm
- 2007: →Swisslion Takovo
- 2010–2011: CSKA Moscow
- 2011: →Žalgiris
- 2011–2012: Nizhny Novgorod
- 2012: →Radnički Kragujevac
- 2012–2013: Mega Vizura
- 2013–2015: Crvena zvezda
- 2015–2016: San Antonio Spurs
- 2015–2016: →Austin Spurs
- 2016–2018: Detroit Pistons
- 2018–2019: Los Angeles Clippers
- 2019: Philadelphia 76ers
- 2019–2022: Dallas Mavericks
- 2022–2024: Houston Rockets
- 2024: Fenerbahçe
- 2025: Zhejiang Lions
- 2025–2026: Ilirija

Career highlights
- All-EuroLeague First Team (2015); EuroLeague rebounding leader (2015); Serbian League champion (2015); 3× Serbian League MVP (2013–2015); Serbian League Domestic Player of the Year (2015); 3× All-Serbian League First Team (2013–2015); Serbian League rebounding leader (2013); ABA League champion (2015); ABA League playoffs MVP (2015); 3× All-ABA League Team (2014, 2015); 2× Serbian Cup winner (2014, 2015); LKL All-Star (2011); LKL champion (2011); Baltic League champion (2011); Lithuanian Cup winner (2011)
- Stats at NBA.com
- Stats at Basketball Reference
Medals
Men's basketball
Representing Serbia
EuroBasket
Silver medal – second place	2017 Finland–Israel–Romania–Turkey
FIBA Under-19 World Cup
Gold medal – first place	2007 Serbia	Team
FIBA Europe Under-20 Championship
Gold medal – first place	2008 Latvia	Team

Boban Marjanović (Serbian Cyrillic: Бобан Марјановић; born August 15, 1988) is a Serbian professional basketball player. He represented the Serbian national team in international competition.

A 2007 junior world champion, Marjanović played abroad in Russia and Lithuania between 2010 and 2012 before making his breakthrough in his home country. As the 2013 MVP of the Serbian league, he moved to KK Crvena zvezda, with whom he won the national championship and the cross-border Adriatic Basketball League (ABA League) in 2015. In addition to further MVP awards in Serbia, Marjanović was also voted one of the five best players in the ABA League and the top European club competition EuroLeague in 2015.

Marjanović signed his first ever NBA contract as a 27-year-old rookie in 2015 with the San Antonio Spurs. He also played for the Detroit Pistons, Los Angeles Clippers, Philadelphia 76ers, Dallas Mavericks and Houston Rockets between 2016 and 2024. At 2.24 m (7 ft 4 in), Marjanović is one of the tallest players in NBA history.

== Early life ==
Marjanović was born and raised in Boljevac in eastern Serbia. Although he was tall from a young age, his family members are all of average height: his father stands only 5 ft 9 in (1.75 m) in height. A pituitary gland condition is thought to have contributed to his gigantism.

Marjanović began playing basketball with the youth teams of Boljevac-based club Rtanj. By age 14, he was 2.09 m (6 ft 10 1/2 in) tall, and began playing for the Serbian professional team Hemofarm. He played in their youth categories until the 2005–06 season.

== Professional career ==
=== Early career ===
Marjanović joined Hemofarm's first team, playing in the Adriatic League, in the second half of the 2005–06 season. He played there until January 2007 when he moved to the Serbian League team Swisslion Takovo on loan. After half seasons there, Marjanović returned to Hemofarm. His teammates included Stefan Marković and Milan Mačvan, with whom he had played on the Serbian junior national team.

In summer 2010, Marjanović signed a three-year contract with CSKA Moscow, on the insistence of Duško Vujošević. After Vujošević was sacked, Marjanović lost his place in CSKA's first team. On December 31, 2010, he moved to Žalgiris on loan until the end of the 2010–11 season. In July 2011, Marjanović signed for Nizhny Novgorod, staying there for half a season.

=== Return to Serbia ===
In January 2012, Marjanović returned to Serbia and signed for Radnički Kragujevac on loan for the rest of the 2011–12 season. The same year in July, Marjanović signed a contract with Serbian team Mega Vizura for the 2012–13 season. He was named the MVP of the Serbian League.

==== Crvena zvezda (2013–2015) ====
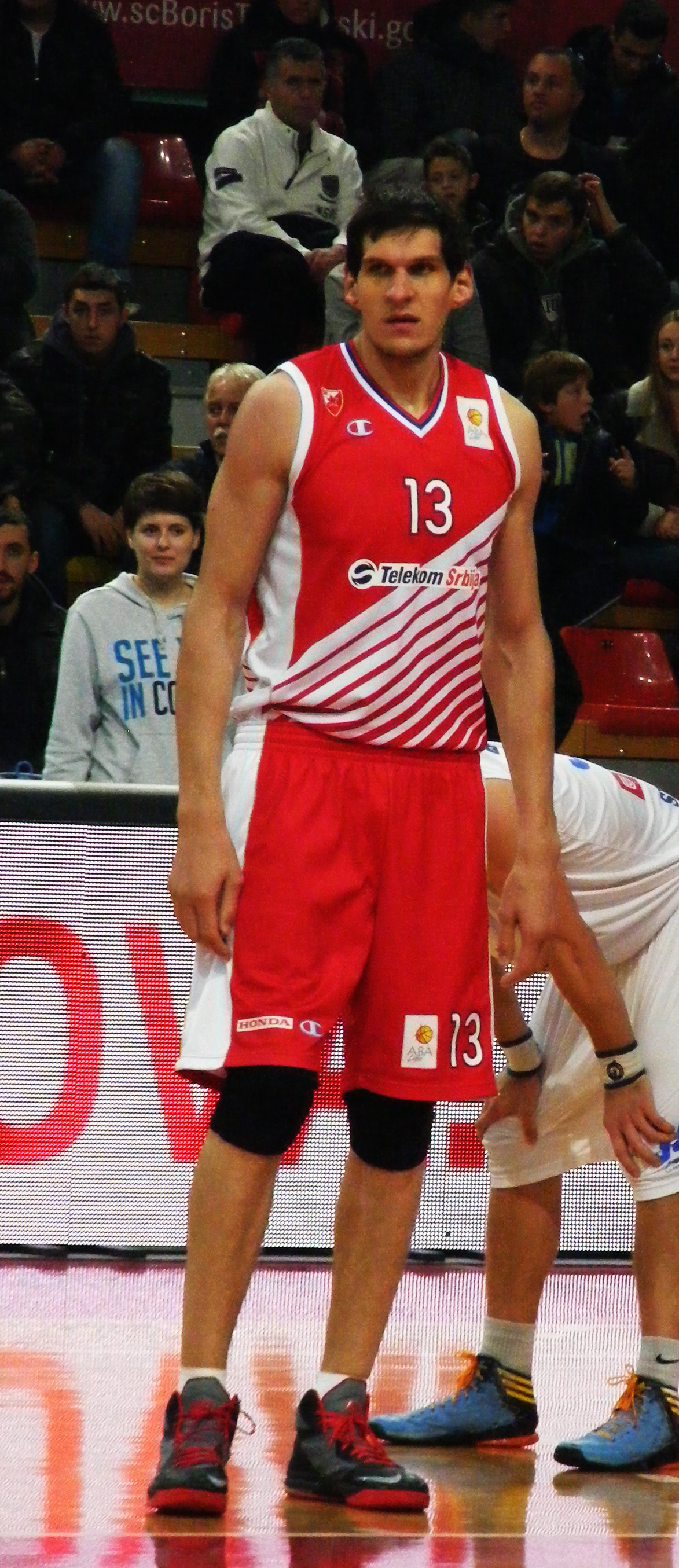
Marjanović playing for Crvena zvezda during the 2014–15 season

On July 2, 2013, Marjanović signed a two-year contract with Crvena zvezda. In December 2013, he was named EuroLeague MVP of the Round for Round 10. In April 2014, along with his teammate DeMarcus Nelson, he was selected for the Ideal Team for the 2013–14 ABA League season.

In the first match of the 2014–15 Euroleague on October 18, 2014, Marjanović led his team to a 76–68 victory against Galatasaray, scoring 22 points and pulling down 10 rebounds in 28 minutes on the court. He was later named the EuroLeague MVP of the Round for Round 1. On November 22, Marjanović recorded 23 points and a career-high 17 rebounds for a total index rating of 39 in a double overtime 103–110 loss against Galatasaray. At the time, his 17 rebounds in a single game was the highest number by any player in the EuroLeague since 2011–12.

In a match against Panathinaikos on April 9, he set the EuroLeague record (since the 2000–01 season) for the most rebounds in a single season with 256, passing the previous record by Mirsad Türkcan, who had 248 rebounds in the 2002–03 season. He also set the EuroLeague record for the most double-doubles in a season with 16, surpassing the record of 14 set by Tanoka Beard in the 2004–05 season. Over 24 EuroLeague matches, his all career-highs were 16.6 points on average, a league-leading 10.7 rebounds and a record (since the EuroLeague 2000–01 season) of 25.67 in PIR.

On April 2, 2015, he was selected for the Ideal Team for the 2014–15 ABA League season. Later that month, he helped his team to win the 2014–15 ABA League trophy. He was named the MVP of the ABA League playoffs. In May 2015, he was chosen for the All-EuroLeague First Team.

On June 5, 2015, Marjanović was named the Serbian Super League MVP for the third consecutive season, having helped his team to reach first place in the regular season with a record of 13–1. Crvena zvezda won the 2014–15 Serbian League championship after a 3–0 victory against Partizan Belgrade.

=== San Antonio Spurs (2015–2016) ===
On July 17, 2015, Marjanović signed a one-year, $1.2 million contract with the San Antonio Spurs. He made his NBA debut on October 30, recording six points and five rebounds in the Spurs' 102–75 win over the Brooklyn Nets. On December 4, he was assigned to the Austin Spurs, San Antonio's D-League affiliate. He was recalled by San Antonio on December 6, and, the following day, scored 18 points on 8-of-10 shooting in a 119–68 win over the Philadelphia 76ers. On December 28, in a victory against the Minnesota Timberwolves – with Tim Duncan out injured and LaMarcus Aldridge limited to six points – Marjanović scored 17 points on 7-of-7 shooting in 14 minutes to help the Spurs defeat the Timberwolves 101–95 and extend their franchise-record home winning streak to 27 matches in the 2014–15 season. Two days later, in a win over the Phoenix Suns, he became the first player in Spurs franchise history to record 12 rebounds in 15 minutes or less. On January 21, 2016, he recorded 17 points and a career-high 13 rebounds in a 117–89 win over the Phoenix Suns. On March 20, he was reassigned to the Austin Spurs, earning a recall two days later. On March 23, he scored a then-career-high 19 points in a 112–88 victory against the Miami Heat. On April 13, in the team's regular-season finale, Marjanović recorded a career-high 22 points and 12 rebounds in a 96–91 win over the Dallas Mavericks.

=== Detroit Pistons (2016–2018) ===
After the 2015–16 season, Marjanović became a restricted free agent. On July 7, 2016, he received a three-year, $21 million offer sheet from the Detroit Pistons. The Spurs declined to match the offer and he signed with the Pistons on July 12. On January 5, 2017, Marjanović recorded 15 points and a career-high 19 rebounds in a 115–114 win over the Charlotte Hornets. He had played only 76 minutes all season prior to the game against the Hornets but, with Andre Drummond in foul trouble and Aron Baynes out injured, coach Stan Van Gundy was forced to give Marjanović extended minutes. On April 7, 2017, he led the Pistons with a career-high 27 points and 12 rebounds off the bench in a 114–109 win over the Houston Rockets.

=== Los Angeles Clippers (2018–2019) ===
On January 29, 2018, along with Tobias Harris, Avery Bradley – a future protected first-round draft pick and a future second-round draft pick – Marjanović was traded to the Los Angeles Clippers in exchange for Blake Griffin, Willie Reed and Brice Johnson. On February 27, 2018, he scored a season-high 18 points in a 122–120 victory against the Denver Nuggets.

=== Philadelphia 76ers (2019) ===
On February 6, 2019, Marjanović, alongside Tobias Harris, was traded to the Philadelphia 76ers. In 22 appearances for the 76ers in the regular season, Marjanović averaged 8.2 points and 5.1 rebounds in 13.9 minutes per game. He later helped the 76ers get past the Brooklyn Nets in the first round of the 2019 NBA playoffs, but the 76ers were eventually eliminated by the Toronto Raptors in the Conference Semifinals.

=== Dallas Mavericks (2019–2022) ===
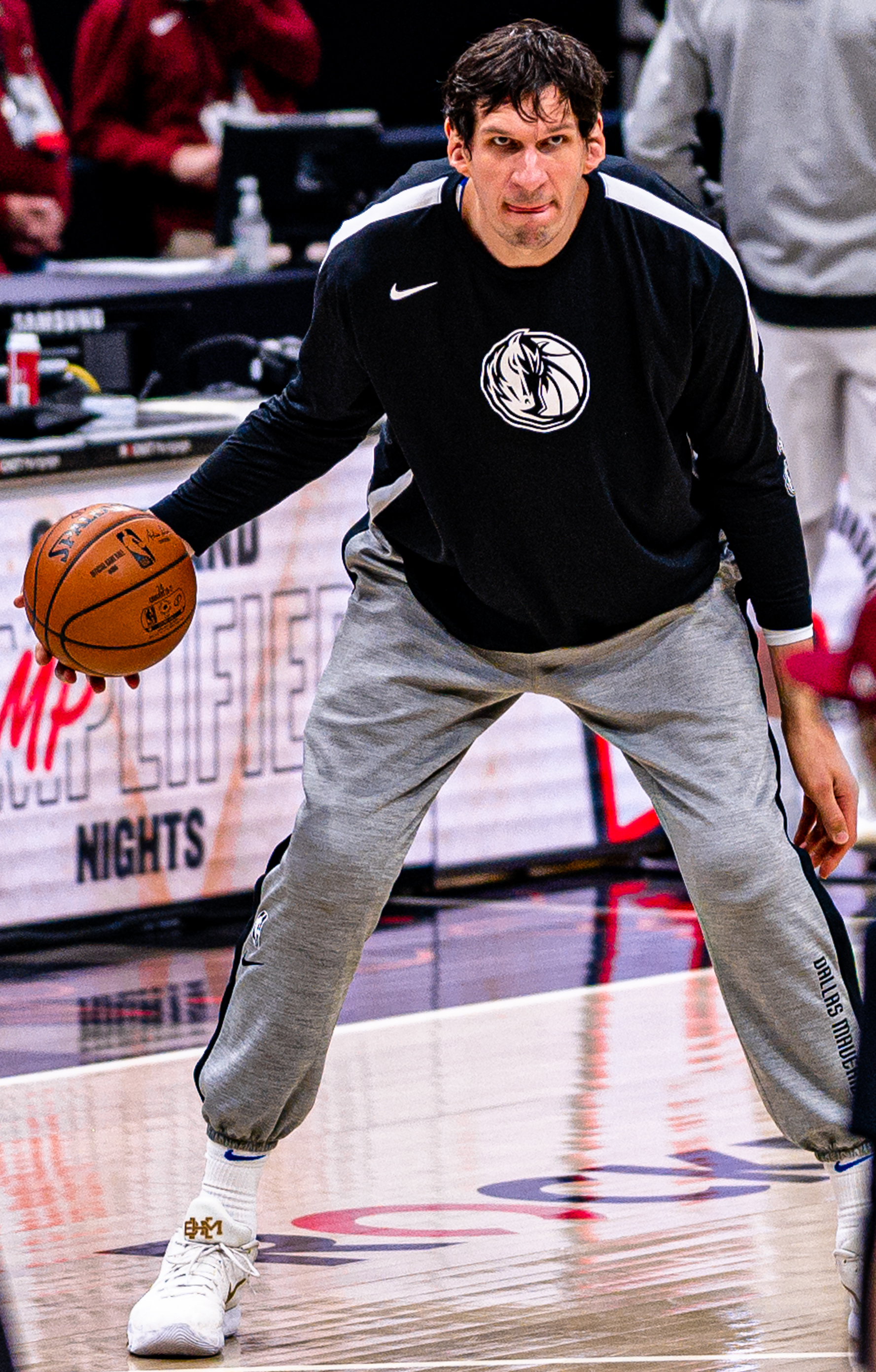
Marjanović with the Mavericks in 2021

On July 23, 2019, Marjanović signed with the Dallas Mavericks. On March 11, 2020, he registered a career-high 31 points, along with 17 rebounds, in a 113–97 win over the Denver Nuggets, the final game before the season was suspended due to the COVID-19 pandemic. On August 10, 2021, Marjanović re-signed with the Mavericks.

=== Houston Rockets (2022–2024) ===
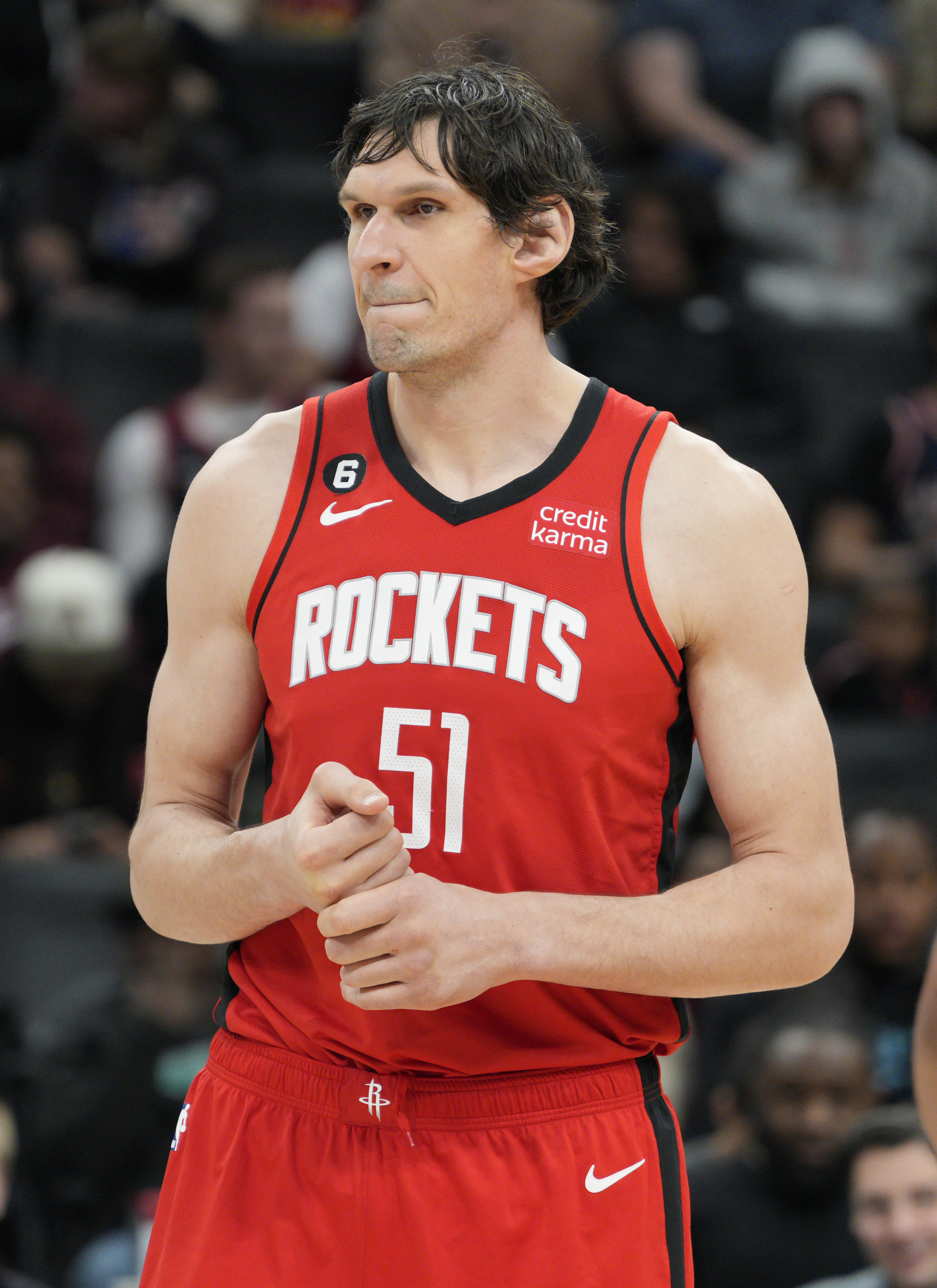
Marjanović with the Houston Rockets in 2023

On June 24, 2022, Marjanović was traded alongside Trey Burke, Marquese Chriss, Sterling Brown and the draft rights to Wendell Moore Jr., to the Houston Rockets in exchange for Christian Wood. On February 9, 2023, the Rockets waived Marjanović, as a result of a three-team trade.

However, on February 13, 2023, Marjanović re-signed with the Rockets, four days after being waived. On April 14, 2024, in a road game for the Houston Rockets at the Los Angeles Clippers, the Clippers had a partnership with fast food chain Chick-fil-A, where fans in attendance received a free chicken sandwich if any visiting team misses two consecutive free throws in the 4th quarter of a home game. Marjanović missed his first of two free throws, then intentionally missed his second free throw, thereby granting those in attendance a free chicken sandwich. The television announcers cried, "He gave them chicken! He's a man of the people!" In September 2024, it was announced he signed at Fenerbahce of Turkey.

=== 2024–25 ===
On September 18, 2024, Marjanović returned to Europe and signed with Fenerbahçe Beko of the BSL and the EuroLeague for the 2024–25 season. On December 23, 2024, Marjanović parted ways with the Turkish team, after appearing in 13 games.

On January 2, 2025, Marjanović signed with the Zhejiang Lions of the Chinese Basketball Association (CBA).

=== Ilirija (2025–26) ===
On December 11, 2025, Marjanović signed with the Ilirija of the Slovenian League and the ABA League. On May 24, 2026, in the Slovenian League game against Krka, Marjanović was involved in a heated verbal exchange with fans of the opposing team, but managed to calm down. Over 18 ABA League games with Ilirija, he averaged 13.9 points and 8.6 rebounds on 50.0% shooting from the field.

On July 24, 2026, Marjanović signed a short-term contract to play for the Philippine club SGA to play in the William Jones Cup over the summer.

== National team career ==
As a junior national team player of Serbia, Marjanović won gold medals at the 2007 FIBA Under-19 World Championship and the 2008 FIBA Europe Under-20 Championship. He was named on the candidates list before both the EuroBasket 2009 and the 2010 FIBA World Championship, but did not make the final 12-man squad. His senior debut with the Serbian national basketball team at a major tournament occurred at EuroBasket 2011 in Lithuania, where Serbia finished in eighth place.

In August 2015, the San Antonio Spurs prohibited him from playing for the Serbian national team at EuroBasket 2015 due to risk of injury after signs of pain in his left foot, although the Serbian Basketball Federation (KSS) stated that no bone fractures were found.

Marjanović represented Serbia at EuroBasket 2017. They won the silver medal, losing the final against Slovenia. Over nine tournament games, he earned the average result of 12.4 points, 4.8 rebounds and 1.4 assists per game on 56.2% shooting from the field.

At the 2019 FIBA Basketball World Cup, the Serbian national team was considered a favorite to win the trophy, but was eventually upset in the quarter-finals by Argentina. With wins over the United States and Czech Republic, they finished in fifth place. Marjanović averaged 6.8 points and 2.5 rebounds over eight matches.

== Career statistics ==
Legend
GP	Games played	GS	Games started	MPG	Minutes per game
FG%	Field-goal percentage	3P%	3-point field-goal percentage	FT%	Free-throw percentage
RPG	Rebounds per game	APG	Assists per game	SPG	Steals per game
BPG	Blocks per game	PPG	Points per game	PIR	Performance index rating
**Bold**	Career high	*	Led the league

=== NBA ===
==== Regular season ====
Year	Team	GP	GS	MPG	FG%	3P%	FT%	RPG	APG	SPG	BPG	PPG
2015–16	San Antonio	**54**	4	9.4	.603	—	.763	3.6	.4	.2	.4	5.5
2016–17	Detroit	35	0	8.4	.545	—	.810	3.7	.3	.2	.3	5.5
2017–18	Detroit	19	1	9.0	.519	—	.800	3.0	.7	.2	.3	6.2
2017–18	L.A. Clippers	20	0	8.3	.551	—	.788	4.4	.4	**.3**	.3	5.9
2018–19	L.A. Clippers	36	**9**	10.4	.607	.000	.758	4.2	.6	**.3**	**.5**	6.7
2018–19	Philadelphia	22	3	**13.9**	.625	**.500**	.722	**5.1**	**1.5**	.2	**.5**	**8.2**
2019–20	Dallas	44	5	9.6	.573	.235	.754	4.5	.5	.2	.2	6.6
2020–21	Dallas	33	3	8.2	.508	.125	**.816**	3.9	.3	.1	.2	4.7
2021–22	Dallas	23	0	5.6	.600	.250	.591	1.7	.1	.0	.1	4.3
2022–23	Houston	31	0	5.5	**.683**	.000	.741	1.9	.3	.2	.1	3.3
2023–24	Houston	14	0	5.1	.529	.000	.643	2.3	.4	.1	.1	3.2
Career		331	25	8.7	.578	.238	.762	3.6	.5	.2	.3	5.5

==== Playoffs ====
Year	Team	GP	GS	MPG	FG%	3P%	FT%	RPG	APG	SPG	BPG	PPG
2016	San Antonio	7	0	6.0	**.667**	—	.889	2.0	.4	.0	**.3**	3.4
2019	Philadelphia	**11**	0	9.5	.600	.000	.842	3.3	**1.0**	.2	**.3**	5.8
2020	Dallas	6	0	13.7	.567	.000	.778	5.8	.8	.0	**.3**	6.8
2021	Dallas	4	**3**	**20.8**	.513	—	.778	**8.0**	**1.0**	.0	**.3**	**11.3**
2022	Dallas	3	0	2.0	.250	—	**1.000**	1.0	.0	**.3**	.0	1.3
Career		31	3	10.3	.560	.000	.833	3.9	.7	.1	.3	5.8

=== EuroLeague ===
Year	Team	GP	GS	MPG	FG%	3P%	FT%	RPG	APG	SPG	BPG	PPG	PIR
2010–11	CSKA Moscow	8	3	11.4	.458	—	.923	3.5	.4	.6	.6	4.3	5.6
2010–11	Žalgiris	6	1	12.3	**.647**	—	.643	3.5	.3	.2	.5	5.2	5.7
2013–14	Crvena zvezda	10	9	19.9	.616	—	.621	7.7	**1.0**	**.9**	.8	10.8	15.2
2014–15	Crvena zvezda	**24**	**24**	**27.3**	.621	—	.781	**10.7***	**1.0**	.4	**.9**	**16.6**	**25.7***
2024–25	Fenerbahçe Beko	6	2	10.0	.455	.000	**1.000**	3.5	.7	.2	.0	4.0	5.2
Career		54	39	20.0	.601	.000	.761	7.5	.8	.5	.7	11.0	16.3

== Appearances in films and television ==
Marjanović made a cameo appearance as Jānis Krūmiņš in the 2015 Serbian sports drama film We Will Be the World Champions and the 2019 American action thriller film John Wick: Chapter 3 – Parabellum. In the latter, he played an assassin named Ernest, who quotes Dante's Divine Comedy and fights John Wick (Keanu Reeves) at the New York Public Library.

In 2021, Marjanović played the grand master in the 1,629th episode of the Serbian television comedy show Državni posao. Marjanović is close friends with Tobias Harris, with whom he has been traded twice. Marjanović and Harris appeared in a 2021 series of Goldfish commercials. Marjanović has also appeared in an advertising campaign for State Farm Insurance.

Marjanović appeared in Netflix film Hustle, produced by LeBron James and Adam Sandler. He played the assassin in the 2023 comedy thriller Hulu original film Self Reliance. In the 2025 film Happy Gilmore 2, Marjanović played the role of Drago Larson — a towering, deadpan enforcer hired to intimidate Happy's newest rival on the pro golf circuit.

== See also ==
- List of European basketball players in the United States
- List of Serbian NBA players
- List of tallest players in NBA history
- List of tallest people
