= 2019–20 Toronto Raptors season =

NBA professional basketball team season

- Division champions
- Head coach: Nick Nurse
- President: Masai Ujiri
- General manager: Bobby Webster
- Owners: Maple Leaf Sports & Entertainment
- Arena: Scotiabank Arena

Results
- Record: 53–19 (.736)
- Place: Division: 1st (Atlantic); Conference: 2nd (Eastern)
- Playoff finish: Conference semifinals (lost to Celtics 3–4)
- Stats at Basketball Reference

Local media
- Television: TSN; Sportsnet; CityTV (NBA bubble game)

The 2019–20 Toronto Raptors season was the 25th season of the franchise in the National Basketball Association (NBA). The Raptors entered the season for the first time in franchise history as the defending NBA champions, following their NBA Finals win over the previous two-time NBA champion Golden State Warriors in six games. The Raptors had the second best team defensive rating in the NBA.

The Raptors lost 2019 NBA Finals MVP Kawhi Leonard in the offseason as he signed a 3-year, $103M max contract with the Los Angeles Clippers, becoming the first Finals MVP to leave the season they won a championship. The Raptors showed they were still championship contenders with Leonard gone, and went 53–19 in a 72-game season, a winning percentage equal to 60 wins in a full season. They were led by Pascal Siakam being an All-NBA and All Star starter, Kyle Lowry earning his 6th All Star selection, Serge Ibaka and Fred VanVleet having their offensive best year of their careers, the impact of Marc Gasol and OG Anunoby on both ends, the success of undrafted rookie Terence Davis who was selected to the 2020 NBA All-Rookie Team, and Nick Nurse winning the 2020 NBA Coach of the Year Award.

The Raptors finished the season with the second best record in the league only behind the Milwaukee Bucks like the 2018–19 NBA season. On March 5, 2020, the Raptors became the second team to clinch a playoff spot by defeating the Golden State Warriors. The season was suspended by the league officials following the games of March 11, after it was reported that Rudy Gobert tested positive for COVID-19.

The Raptors faced the Brooklyn Nets in the first round of the playoffs where they swept the Nets in four games. They would go on to lose to the Boston Celtics in seven games in the Eastern Conference semifinals. Raptors Franchise Icon Kyle Lowry made his 6th straight All Star appearance. Pascal Siakam made his first All NBA Team as he was selected to the 2020 All NBA Second Team. Siakam was selected as an All Star starter in his first NBA All Star Game in 2020.

== Draft ==
Round	Pick	Player	Position	Nationality	College
2	59	Dewan Hernandez	C	USA	Miami

The Raptors only held a second-round draft pick. In July 2018 they had traded their first-round pick and DeMar DeRozan to the San Antonio Spurs to obtain Kawhi Leonard and Danny Green.

== Roster ==
2019–20 Toronto Raptors roster
Players

Pos.	No.	Player	Height	Weight	DOB	From
F	3	OG Anunoby	6 ft 7 in (2.01 m)	232 lb (105 kg)	1997–07–17	Indiana
F	25	Chris Boucher	6 ft 10 in (2.08 m)	215 lb (98 kg)	1993–01–11	Oregon
G/F	12	Oshae Brissett (TW)	6 ft 7 in (2.01 m)	210 lb (95 kg)	1998–06–20	Syracuse
G	0	Terence Davis	6 ft 4 in (1.93 m)	201 lb (91 kg)	1997–05–16	Mississippi
C	33	Marc Gasol	7 ft 1 in (2.16 m)	255 lb (116 kg)	1985–01–29	Lausanne CS (TN)
F/C	20	Dewan Hernandez	6 ft 11 in (2.11 m)	235 lb (107 kg)	1996–12–09	Miami (FL)
F	4	Rondae Hollis-Jefferson	6 ft 7 in (2.01 m)	217 lb (98 kg)	1995–01–03	Arizona
C	9	Serge Ibaka	7 ft 0 in (2.13 m)	245 lb (111 kg)	1989-09-18	Republic of the Congo
G/F	5	Stanley Johnson	6 ft 7 in (2.01 m)	242 lb (110 kg)	1996–05–29	Arizona
G	7	Kyle Lowry	6 ft 0 in (1.83 m)	196 lb (89 kg)	1986–03–25	Villanova
G	22	Patrick McCaw	6 ft 7 in (2.01 m)	181 lb (82 kg)	1995–10–25	UNLV
G/F	13	Malcolm Miller	6 ft 7 in (2.01 m)	210 lb (95 kg)	1993–03–06	Holy Cross
G	24	Norman Powell	6 ft 3 in (1.91 m)	215 lb (98 kg)	1993–05–25	UCLA
F	43	Pascal Siakam	6 ft 9 in (2.06 m)	230 lb (104 kg)	1994–04–02	New Mexico State
G	21	Matt Thomas	6 ft 4 in (1.93 m)	190 lb (86 kg)	1994–08–04	Iowa State
G	23	Fred VanVleet	6 ft 1 in (1.85 m)	197 lb (89 kg)	1994–02–25	Wichita State
F	1	Paul Watson (TW)	6 ft 6 in (1.98 m)	210 lb (95 kg)	1994–12–30	Fresno State

Coaches
Head coach
- Nick Nurse
Assistant(s)
- Nate Bjorkgren
- Brittni Donaldson
- Jon Goodwillie
- Adrian Griffin
- Alex McKechnie
- Patrick Mutombo
- Jim Sann
- Sergio Scariolo
- John Corbacio

Legend
- (DP) Unsigned draft pick
- (FA) Free agent
- (S) Suspended
- (GL) On assignment to G League affiliate
- (TW) Two-way affiliate player
- Injured

Roster
Updated: 2020–08-21

== Standings ==
=== Division ===
Atlantic Division	W	L	PCT	GB	Home	Road	Div	GP
y – Toronto Raptors	53	19	.736	–	26‍–‍10	27‍–‍9	9–5	72
x – Boston Celtics	48	24	.667	5.0	26‍–‍10	22‍–‍14	9–6	72
x – Philadelphia 76ers	43	30	.589	10.5	31‍–‍4	12‍–‍26	11–5	73
x – Brooklyn Nets	35	37	.486	18.0	20‍–‍16	15‍–‍21	6–10	72
New York Knicks	21	45	.318	29.0	11‍–‍22	10‍–‍23	2–11	66

=== Conference ===
Eastern Conference
#	Team	W	L	PCT	GB	GP
1	z – Milwaukee Bucks *	56	17	.767	–	73
2	y – Toronto Raptors *	53	19	.736	2.5	72
3	x – Boston Celtics	48	24	.667	7.5	72
4	x – Indiana Pacers	45	28	.616	11.0	73
5	y – Miami Heat *	44	29	.603	12.0	73
6	x – Philadelphia 76ers	43	30	.589	13.0	73
7	x – Brooklyn Nets	35	37	.486	20.5	72
8	x – Orlando Magic	33	40	.452	23.0	73
9	Washington Wizards	25	47	.347	30.5	72
10	Charlotte Hornets	23	42	.354	29.0	65
11	Chicago Bulls	22	43	.338	30.0	65
12	New York Knicks	21	45	.318	31.5	66
13	Detroit Pistons	20	46	.303	32.5	66
14	Atlanta Hawks	20	47	.299	33.0	67
15	Cleveland Cavaliers	19	46	.292	33.0	65

== Game log ==
=== Preseason ===
2019 pre-season game log
Total: 2–2 (home: 1–1; road: 1–1)
Preseason: 2–2 (home: 1–1; road: 1–1)

Game	Date	Team	Score	High points	High rebounds	High assists	Location Attendance	Record
1	October 8	Houston	W 134–129	Pascal Siakam (24)	Pascal Siakam (11)	Davis, VanVleet (5)	Saitama Super Arena; 20,413	1–0
2	October 10	@ Houston	L 111–118	Norman Powell (22)	Serge Ibaka (8)	Fred VanVleet (10)	Saitama Super Arena; 20,413	1–1
3	October 13	Chicago	L 91–105	OG Anunoby (15)	Dewan Hernandez (11)	Anunoby, Davis, Johnson (4)	Scotiabank Arena; 16,438	1–2
4	October 18	@ Brooklyn	W 123–107	OG Anunoby (18)	Marc Gasol (9)	Fred VanVleet (8)	Barclays Center; 12,380	2–2

2019–20 season schedule

=== Restart scrimmage ===
2020 pre-season game log
Total: 2–1 (home: 2–0; road: 0–1)
Restart scrimmage: 2–1 (home: 2–0; road: 0–1)

Game	Date	Team	Score	High points	High rebounds	High assists	Location Attendance	Record
1	July 24	Houston	W 94–83	Serge Ibaka (18)	Rondae Hollis-Jefferson (8)	Fred VanVleet (7)	The Arena	1–0
2	July 26	Portland	W 110–104	Serge Ibaka (19)	Chris Boucher (7)	Anunoby, Hollis-Jefferson, Lowry (4)	Visa Athletic Center	2–0
3	July 28	@ Phoenix	L 106–117	Pascal Siakam (17)	Gasol, Ibaka (9)	Kyle Lowry (7)	The Arena	2–1

2019–20 season schedule

=== Regular season ===
2019–20 game log
Total: 53–19 (home: 26–10; road: 27–9)
October: 4–1 (home: 3–0; road: 1–1)

Game	Date	Team	Score	High points	High rebounds	High assists	Location Attendance	Record
1	October 22	New Orleans	W 130–122 (OT)	Siakam, VanVleet (34)	Pascal Siakam (18)	Fred VanVleet (7)	Scotiabank Arena; 20,787	1–0
2	October 25	@ Boston	L 106–112	Pascal Siakam (33)	Anunoby, Ibaka, Siakam (8)	Kyle Lowry (7)	TD Garden; 18,624	1–1
3	October 26	@ Chicago	W 108–84	Pascal Siakam (19)	Marc Gasol (10)	Kyle Lowry (8)	United Center; 21,498	2–1
4	October 28	Orlando	W 104–95	Kyle Lowry (26)	Gasol, Ibaka (10)	Lowry, VanVleet (6)	Scotiabank Arena; 19,800	3–1
5	October 30	Detroit	W 125–113	Pascal Siakam (30)	OG Anunoby (8)	Fred VanVleet (11)	Scotiabank Arena; 19,800	4–1

November: 10–3 (home: 5–0; road: 5–3)

Game	Date	Team	Score	High points	High rebounds	High assists	Location Attendance	Record
6	November 2	@ Milwaukee	L 105–115	Kyle Lowry (36)	Marc Gasol (12)	Fred VanVleet (7)	Fiserv Forum; 17,637	4–2
7	November 6	Sacramento	W 124–120	Kyle Lowry (24)	Pascal Siakam (13)	Kyle Lowry (6)	Scotiabank Arena; 19,800	5–2
8	November 8	@ New Orleans	W 122–104	Pascal Siakam (44)	Pascal Siakam (10)	Fred VanVleet (11)	Smoothie King Center; 16,337	6–2
9	November 10	@ L. A. Lakers	W 113–104	Pascal Siakam (24)	Pascal Siakam (11)	Fred VanVleet (10)	Staples Center; 18,997	7–2
10	November 11	@ L. A. Clippers	L 88–98	Pascal Siakam (16)	Pascal Siakam (10)	Fred VanVleet (8)	Staples Center; 19,068	7–3
11	November 13	@ Portland	W 114–106	Pascal Siakam (36)	Rondae Hollis-Jefferson (11)	Fred VanVleet (7)	Moda Center; 19,544	8–3
12	November 16	@ Dallas	L 102–110	Norman Powell (26)	Marc Gasol (9)	Siakam, VanVleet (7)	American Airlines Center; 19,926	8–4
13	November 18	Charlotte	W 132–96	OG Anunoby (24)	Chris Boucher (11)	Marc Gasol (9)	Scotiabank Arena; 19,800	9–4
14	November 20	Orlando	W 113–97	Fred VanVleet (24)	Boucher, Siakam (11)	Fred VanVleet (7)	Scotiabank Arena; 19,800	10–4
15	November 23	@ Atlanta	W 119–116	Pascal Siakam (34)	Rondae Hollis-Jefferson (9)	Fred VanVleet (9)	State Farm Arena; 16,931	11–4
16	November 25	Philadelphia	W 101–96	Pascal Siakam (25)	Rondae Hollis-Jefferson (10)	Marc Gasol (9)	Scotiabank Arena; 19,800	12–4
17	November 27	New York	W 126–98	Pascal Siakam (31)	Anunoby, Boucher (12)	Terence Davis (5)	Scotiabank Arena; 19,800	13–4
18	November 29	@ Orlando	W 90–83	Norman Powell (33)	Pascal Siakam (13)	Pascal Siakam (5)	Amway Center; 17,014	14–4

December: 9–7 (home: 6–5; road: 3–2)

Game	Date	Team	Score	High points	High rebounds	High assists	Location Attendance	Record
19	December 1	Utah	W 130–110	Pascal Siakam (35)	Rondae Hollis-Jefferson (6)	Fred VanVleet (11)	Scotiabank Arena; 18,132	15–4
20	December 3	Miami	L 110–121 (OT)	Norman Powell (23)	Pascal Siakam (12)	Kyle Lowry (11)	Scotiabank Arena; 19,800	15–5
21	December 5	Houston	L 109–119	Pascal Siakam (24)	Pascal Siakam (9)	Kyle Lowry (8)	Scotiabank Arena; 19,800	15–6
22	December 8	@ Philadelphia	L 104–110	Kyle Lowry (26)	OG Anunoby (10)	Kyle Lowry (5)	Wells Fargo Center; 20,313	15–7
23	December 9	@ Chicago	W 93–92	Pascal Siakam (22)	Serge Ibaka (14)	Kyle Lowry (7)	United Center; 14,775	16–7
24	December 11	L. A. Clippers	L 92–112	Pascal Siakam (24)	Marc Gasol (11)	Gasol, Lowry (6)	Scotiabank Arena; 20,144	16–8
25	December 14	Brooklyn	W 110–102	Pascal Siakam (30)	Marc Gasol (15)	Kyle Lowry (6)	Scotiabank Arena; 19,800	17–8
26	December 16	Cleveland	W 133–113	Pascal Siakam (33)	OG Anunoby (9)	Kyle Lowry (11)	Scotiabank Arena; 19,800	18–8
27	December 18	@ Detroit	W 112–99	Pascal Siakam (26)	Serge Ibaka (13)	Kyle Lowry (10)	Little Caesars Arena; 15,319	19–8
28	December 20	Washington	W 122–118	Kyle Lowry (26)	Serge Ibaka (10)	Kyle Lowry (9)	Scotiabank Arena; 19,800	20–8
29	December 22	Dallas	W 110–107	Kyle Lowry (32)	Rondae Hollis-Jefferson (9)	Kyle Lowry (10)	Scotiabank Arena; 19,800	21–8
30	December 23	@ Indiana	L 115–120 (OT)	Kyle Lowry (30)	OG Anunoby (12)	Fred VanVleet (11)	Bankers Life Fieldhouse; 17,164	21–9
31	December 25	Boston	L 102–118	Fred VanVleet (27)	Serge Ibaka (8)	Kyle Lowry (8)	Scotiabank Arena; 19,800	21–10
32	December 28	@ Boston	W 113–97	Kyle Lowry (30)	Serge Ibaka (10)	Patrick McCaw (8)	TD Garden; 19,156	22–10
33	December 29	Oklahoma City	L 97–98	Lowry, VanVleet (20)	Serge Ibaka (14)	Fred VanVleet (8)	Scotiabank Arena; 19,800	22–11
34	December 31	Cleveland	W 117–97	Kyle Lowry (24)	Serge Ibaka (10)	Kyle Lowry (8)	Scotiabank Arena; 19,800	23–11

January: 12–3 (home: 3–2; road: 9–1)

Game	Date	Team	Score	High points	High rebounds	High assists	Location Attendance	Record
35	January 2	@ Miami	L 76–84	Serge Ibaka (19)	OG Anunoby (12)	Kyle Lowry (8)	American Airlines Arena; 19,939	23–12
36	January 4	@ Brooklyn	W 121–102	Fred VanVleet (29)	Serge Ibaka (12)	Fred VanVleet (11)	Barclays Center; 17,732	24–12
37	January 7	Portland	L 99–101	Kyle Lowry (24)	Serge Ibaka (11)	Kyle Lowry (10)	Scotiabank Arena; 19,800	24–13
38	January 8	@ Charlotte	W 112–110 (OT)	Davis, Ibaka (23)	Davis, Ibaka (11)	Patrick McCaw (11)	Spectrum Center; 13,965	25–13
39	January 12	San Antonio	L 104–105	Serge Ibaka (21)	Serge Ibaka (14)	Kyle Lowry (15)	Scotiabank Arena; 19,800	25–14
40	January 15	@ Oklahoma City	W 130–121	Norman Powell (23)	Terence Davis (7)	Kyle Lowry (8)	Chesapeake Energy Arena; 18,203	26–14
41	January 17	Washington	W 140–111	Norman Powell (28)	Serge Ibaka (8)	Kyle Lowry (8)	Scotiabank Arena; 19,800	27–14
42	January 18	@ Minnesota	W 122–112	Fred VanVleet (29)	Kyle Lowry (7)	Gasol, Hollis-Jefferson, Powell (4)	Target Center; 16,520	28–14
43	January 20	@ Atlanta	W 122–117	Norman Powell (27)	Rondae Hollis-Jefferson (10)	Kyle Lowry (7)	State Farm Arena; 17,300	29–14
44	January 22	Philadelphia	W 107–95	Fred VanVleet (22)	Pascal Siakam (15)	Fred VanVleet (8)	Scotiabank Arena; 19,800	30–14
45	January 24	@ New York	W 118–112	Kyle Lowry (26)	Marc Gasol (9)	Fred VanVleet (9)	Madison Square Garden; 18,883	31–14
46	January 26	@ San Antonio	W 110–106	Pascal Siakam (35)	Marc Gasol (12)	Fred VanVleet (7)	AT&T Center; 18,354	32–14
47	January 28	Atlanta	W 130–114	Ibaka, Siakam (24)	Serge Ibaka (10)	Kyle Lowry (11)	Scotiabank Arena; 19,800	33–14
48	January 30	@ Cleveland	W 115–109	Serge Ibaka (26)	Fred VanVleet (7)	Fred VanVleet (12)	Rocket Mortgage FieldHouse; 17,695	34–14
49	January 31	@ Detroit	W 105–92	Pascal Siakam (30)	Fred VanVleet (8)	Fred VanVleet (9)	Little Caesars Arena; 17,356	35–14

February: 7–3 (home: 6–2; road: 1–1)

Game	Date	Team	Score	High points	High rebounds	High assists	Location Attendance	Record
50	February 2	Chicago	W 129–102	Terence Davis (31)	Pascal Siakam (9)	Fred VanVleet (8)	Scotiabank Arena; 19,800	36–14
51	February 5	Indiana	W 119–118	Kyle Lowry (32)	Pascal Siakam (9)	Kyle Lowry (10)	Scotiabank Arena; 19,800	37–14
52	February 7	@ Indiana	W 115–106	Serge Ibaka (22)	Serge Ibaka (10)	Kyle Lowry (11)	Bankers Life Fieldhouse; 17,028	38–14
53	February 8	Brooklyn	W 119–118	Fred VanVleet (29)	Terence Davis (8)	Fred VanVleet (6)	Scotiabank Arena; 19,800	39–14
54	February 10	Minnesota	W 137–126	Pascal Siakam (34)	OG Anunoby (12)	Kyle Lowry (11)	Scotiabank Arena; 19,800	40–14
55	February 12	@ Brooklyn	L 91–101	Serge Ibaka (28)	Kyle Lowry (11)	Kyle Lowry (12)	Barclays Center; 15,823	40–15
56	February 21	Phoenix	W 118–101	Pascal Siakam (37)	Pascal Siakam (12)	Kyle Lowry (10)	Scotiabank Arena; 19,800	41–15
57	February 23	Indiana	W 127–81	Pascal Siakam (21)	Serge Ibaka (15)	Kyle Lowry (11)	Scotiabank Arena; 19,800	42–15
58	February 25	Milwaukee	L 97–108	Pascal Siakam (22)	Rondae Hollis-Jefferson (8)	Kyle Lowry (6)	Scotiabank Arena; 19,993	42–16
59	February 28	Charlotte	L 96–99	Pascal Siakam (24)	Anunoby, Hollis-Jefferson (9)	Kyle Lowry (6)	Scotiabank Arena; 19,800	42–17

March: 4–1 (home: 0–0; road: 4–1)

Game	Date	Team	Score	High points	High rebounds	High assists	Location Attendance	Record
60	March 1	@ Denver	L 118–133	OG Anunoby (32)	Anunoby, Siakam (7)	Kyle Lowry (8)	Pepsi Center; 19,777	42–18
61	March 3	@ Phoenix	W 123–114	Pascal Siakam (33)	Chris Boucher (15)	Kyle Lowry (6)	Talking Stick Resort Arena; 15,553	43–18
62	March 5	@ Golden State	W 121–113	Norman Powell (37)	Serge Ibaka (13)	Kyle Lowry (10)	Chase Center; 18,064	44–18
63	March 8	@ Sacramento	W 118–113	Norman Powell (31)	Serge Ibaka (10)	Kyle Lowry (8)	Golden 1 Center; 16,449	45–18
64	March 9	@ Utah	W 101–92	Ibaka, Siakam (27)	Serge Ibaka (13)	Pascal Siakam (8)	Vivint Smart Home Arena; 18,306	46–18

Cancelled games

Game	Date	Team	Score	High points	High rebounds	High assists	Location Attendance	Record
65	March 14	Detroit					Scotiabank Arena	
66	March 16	Golden State					Scotiabank Arena	
67	March 18	@ Philadelphia					Wells Fargo Center	
68	March 20	Boston					Scotiabank Arena	
69	March 22	Denver					Scotiabank Arena	
70	March 24	LA Lakers					Scotiabank Arena	
71	March 25	@ New York					Madison Square Garden	
72	March 28	@ Memphis					FedExForum	
73	March 30	Memphis					Scotiabank Arena	
74	April 1	@ Milwaukee					Fiserv Forum	
75	April 3	Milwaukee					Scotiabank Arena	
76	April 5	@ Houston					Toyota Center	
77	April 7	@ Washington					Capital One Arena	
78	April 8	@ Charlotte					Spectrum Center	
79	April 10	Atlanta					Scotiabank Arena	
80	April 12	New York					Scotiabank Arena	
81	April 14	@ Miami					American Airlines Arena	
82	April 15	@ Orlando					Amway Center	

Seeding games: 7–1 (home: 3–1; road: 4–0)

Game	Date	Team	Score	High points	High rebounds	High assists	Location Attendance	Record
65	August 1	L. A. Lakers	W 107–92	Kyle Lowry (33)	Kyle Lowry (14)	Fred VanVleet (11)	The Arena; No In-Person Attendance	47–18
66	August 3	@ Miami	W 107–103	Fred VanVleet (36)	Kyle Lowry (8)	Lowry, Powell (5)	HP Field House; No In-Person Attendance	48–18
67	August 5	@ Orlando	W 109–99	Fred VanVleet (21)	Ibaka, Lowry (9)	Lowry, VanVleet (10)	Visa Athletic Center; No In-Person Attendance	49–18
68	August 7	Boston	L 100–122	Fred VanVleet (13)	Marc Gasol (9)	Gasol, VanVleet (4)	The Arena; No In-Person Attendance	49–19
69	August 9	Memphis	W 108–99	Pascal Siakam (26)	Serge Ibaka (12)	Kyle Lowry (8)	Visa Athletic Center; No In-Person Attendance	50–19
70	August 10	@ Milwaukee	W 114–106	Chris Boucher (25)	Chris Boucher (11)	Marc Gasol (8)	HP Field House; No In-Person Attendance	51–19
71	August 12	@ Philadelphia	W 125–121	Boucher, Lowry (19)	Boucher, Siakam (9)	Fred VanVleet (6)	HP Field House; No In-Person Attendance	52–19
72	August 14	Denver	W 117–109	Stanley Johnson (23)	Chris Boucher (9)	Stanley Johnson (6)	HP Field House; No In-Person Attendance	53–19

2019–20 season schedule

=== Playoffs ===
see also 2020 NBA playoffs

2020 playoff game log
Total: 7–4 (home: 2–4; road: 5–0)
First Round: 4–0 (home: 2–0; road: 2–0)

Game	Date	Team	Score	High points	High rebounds	High assists	Location Attendance	Series
1	August 17	Brooklyn	W 134–110	Fred VanVleet (30)	Pascal Siakam (11)	Fred VanVleet (11)	AdventHealth Arena; No in-person attendance	1–0
2	August 19	Brooklyn	W 104–99	Powell, VanVleet (24)	Kyle Lowry (9)	Fred VanVleet (10)	HP Field House; No in-person attendance	2–0
3	August 21	@ Brooklyn	W 117–92	Pascal Siakam (26)	Serge Ibaka (13)	Kyle Lowry (7)	HP Field House; No in-person attendance	3–0
4	August 23	@ Brooklyn	W 150–122	Norman Powell (29)	Serge Ibaka (15)	Pascal Siakam (10)	HP Field House; No in-person attendance	4–0

Conference semifinals: 3–4 (home: 0–4; road: 3–0)

Game	Date	Team	Score	High points	High rebounds	High assists	Location Attendance	Series
1	August 30	Boston	L 94–112	Kyle Lowry (17)	Serge Ibaka (9)	Lowry, VanVleet (8)	HP Field House; No in-person attendance	0–1
2	September 1	Boston	L 99–102	OG Anunoby (20)	Serge Ibaka (9)	Lowry, VanVleet (7)	HP Field House; No in-person attendance	0–2
3	September 3	@ Boston	W 104–103	Kyle Lowry (31)	OG Anunoby (10)	Kyle Lowry (8)	HP Field House; No in-person attendance	1–2
4	September 5	@ Boston	W 100–93	Pascal Siakam (23)	Lowry, Siakam (11)	Kyle Lowry (7)	HP Field House; No in-person attendance	2–2
5	September 7	Boston	L 89–111	Fred VanVleet (18)	OG Anunoby (7)	Lowry, VanVleet (5)	HP Field House; No in-person attendance	2–3
6	September 9	@ Boston	W 125–122 (2OT)	Kyle Lowry (33)	OG Anunoby (13)	Fred VanVleet (7)	HP Field House; No in-person attendance	3–3
7	September 11	Boston	L 87–92	Fred VanVleet (20)	Pascal Siakam (11)	Fred VanVleet (6)	AdventHealth Arena; No in-person attendance	3–4

2020 playoff schedule

== Player statistics ==
=== Regular season ===
Player	POS	GP	GS	MP	REB	AST	STL	BLK	PTS	MPG	RPG	APG	SPG	BPG	PPG
Terence Davis	SG	72	4	1,209	237	115	39	14	543	16.8	3.3	1.6	.5	.2	7.5
OG Anunoby	SF	69	68	2,066	364	108	96	45	733	29.9	5.3	1.6	1.4	.7	10.6
Chris Boucher	C	62	0	819	277	26	22	61	411	13.2	4.5	.4	.4	1.0	6.6
Pascal Siakam	PF	60	60	2,110	439	207	61	53	1,371	35.2	7.3	3.5	1.0	.9	22.9
Rondae Hollis-Jefferson	PF	60	6	1,122	283	106	46	23	418	18.7	4.7	1.8	.8	.4	7.0
Kyle Lowry	PG	58	58	2,098	292	433	82	26	1,126	36.2	5.0	7.5	1.4	.4	19.4
Serge Ibaka	C	55	27	1,485	452	77	28	46	845	27.0	8.2	1.4	.5	.8	15.4
Fred VanVleet	SG	54	54	1,928	203	357	100	17	952	35.7	3.8	6.6	1.9	.3	17.6
Norman Powell	SG	52	26	1,479	190	91	60	21	830	28.4	3.7	1.8	1.2	.4	16.0
Marc Gasol	C	44	43	1,161	275	147	34	38	331	26.4	6.3	3.3	.8	.9	7.5
Matt Thomas	SG	41	1	440	61	22	10	1	202	10.7	1.5	.5	.2	.0	4.9
Patrick McCaw	SF	37	12	908	86	79	39	4	170	24.5	2.3	2.1	1.1	.1	4.6
Malcolm Miller	SF	28	1	162	16	11	5	2	35	5.8	.6	.4	.2	.1	1.3
Stanley Johnson	PF	25	0	150	37	20	6	4	60	6.0	1.5	.8	.2	.2	2.4
Oshae Brissett	SF	19	0	135	26	7	4	1	37	7.1	1.4	.4	.2	.1	1.9
Paul Watson^{†}	SF	8	0	70	15	5	3	1	31	8.8	1.9	.6	.4	.1	3.9
Dewan Hernandez	C	6	0	28	14	3	1	0	14	4.7	2.3	.5	.2	.0	2.3
Shamorie Ponds	PG	4	0	11	1	2	0	1	9	2.8	.3	.5	.0	.3	2.3

- ^{†} Denotes player spent time with another team in the season. Stats reflect time with the Raptors only.

=== Playoffs ===
Player	POS	GP	GS	MP	REB	AST	STL	BLK	PTS	MPG	RPG	APG	SPG	BPG	PPG
Fred VanVleet	SG	11	11	430	48	76	18	7	216	39.1	4.4	6.9	1.6	.6	19.6
Pascal Siakam	PF	11	11	418	83	42	12	4	187	38.0	7.5	3.8	1.1	.4	17.0
Kyle Lowry	PG	11	11	413	72	64	19	8	195	37.5	6.5	5.8	1.7	.7	17.7
OG Anunoby	SF	11	11	393	76	13	11	13	115	35.7	6.9	1.2	1.0	1.2	10.5
Marc Gasol	C	11	11	228	48	29	5	7	66	20.7	4.4	2.6	.5	.6	6.0
Norman Powell	SG	11	0	273	26	11	6	3	147	24.8	2.4	1.0	.5	.3	13.4
Serge Ibaka	C	11	0	251	85	13	2	14	163	22.8	7.7	1.2	.2	1.3	14.8
Matt Thomas	SG	10	0	84	14	7	1	1	31	8.4	1.4	.7	.1	.1	3.1
Chris Boucher	C	7	0	43	12	1	0	2	8	6.1	1.7	.1	.0	.3	1.1
Terence Davis	SG	6	0	84	13	7	1	0	43	14.0	2.2	1.2	.2	.0	7.2
Rondae Hollis-Jefferson	PF	5	0	39	10	3	2	1	14	7.8	2.0	.6	.4	.2	2.8
Stanley Johnson	PF	3	0	20	4	6	0	0	13	6.7	1.3	2.0	.0	.0	4.3
Paul Watson	SF	2	0	9	0	1	1	0	2	4.5	.0	.5	.5	.0	1.0
Malcolm Miller	SF	1	0	5	0	0	0	0	3	5.0	.0	.0	.0	.0	3.0

== Transactions ==
=== Re-signed ===
Player	Signed	Contract
Marc Gasol	June 25, 2019	1yr/$25.4M
Patrick McCaw	July 8, 2019	2yr/$8M

=== Additions ===
Player	Signed	Contract	Former team
Stanley Johnson	July 6, 2019	2-yr/$7.5M	New Orleans Pelicans
Rondae Hollis-Jefferson	July 7, 2019	1-yr	Brooklyn Nets
Terence Davis	July 11, 2019	2-yr	Ole Miss Rebels
Matt Thomas	July 19, 2019	Undisclosed	Valencia
Oshae Brissett	July 23, 2019	Undisclosed	Syracuse Orange
Sagaba Konate	July 23, 2019	Undisclosed	West Virginia Mountaineers
Devin Robinson	July 23, 2019	Undisclosed	Washington Wizards
Cameron Payne	July 25, 2019	Undisclosed	Cleveland Cavaliers
Isaiah Taylor	September 19, 2019	Undisclosed	Cleveland Cavaliers

=== Subtractions ===
Player	Reason	New Team
Kawhi Leonard	Unrestricted Free Agent	Los Angeles Clippers
Danny Green	Unrestricted Free Agent	Los Angeles Lakers
Jeremy Lin	Unrestricted Free Agent	Beijing Ducks
Jordan Loyd	Unrestricted Free Agent	Valencia
Jodie Meeks	Unrestricted Free Agent	Shanxi Loongs

== Awards ==
Player	Award	Date awarded	Ref.
Pascal Siakam	Eastern Conference Player of the Week	November 11, 2019	
Nick Nurse	Eastern Conference Coach of the Month (November)	December 2, 2019	
Kyle Lowry	Eastern Conference Player of the Week	December 23, 2019	
Pascal Siakam	NBA All-Star starter (1st appearance)	January 23, 2020	
Pascal Siakam	Eastern Conference Player of the Week	January 27, 2020	
Kyle Lowry	NBA All-Star reserve (6th appearance)	January 30, 2020	
Nick Nurse	Eastern Conference Coach of the Month (January)	February 3, 2020	
Norman Powell	Eastern Conference Player of the Week	March 9, 2020	
Nick Nurse	NBA Coach of the Year	August 22, 2020	
Terence Davis	NBA All-Rookie Second Team	September 15, 2020	
Pascal Siakam	All-NBA Second Team	September 16, 2020	
