= Chris Clemons (basketball) =

American basketball player (born 1997)

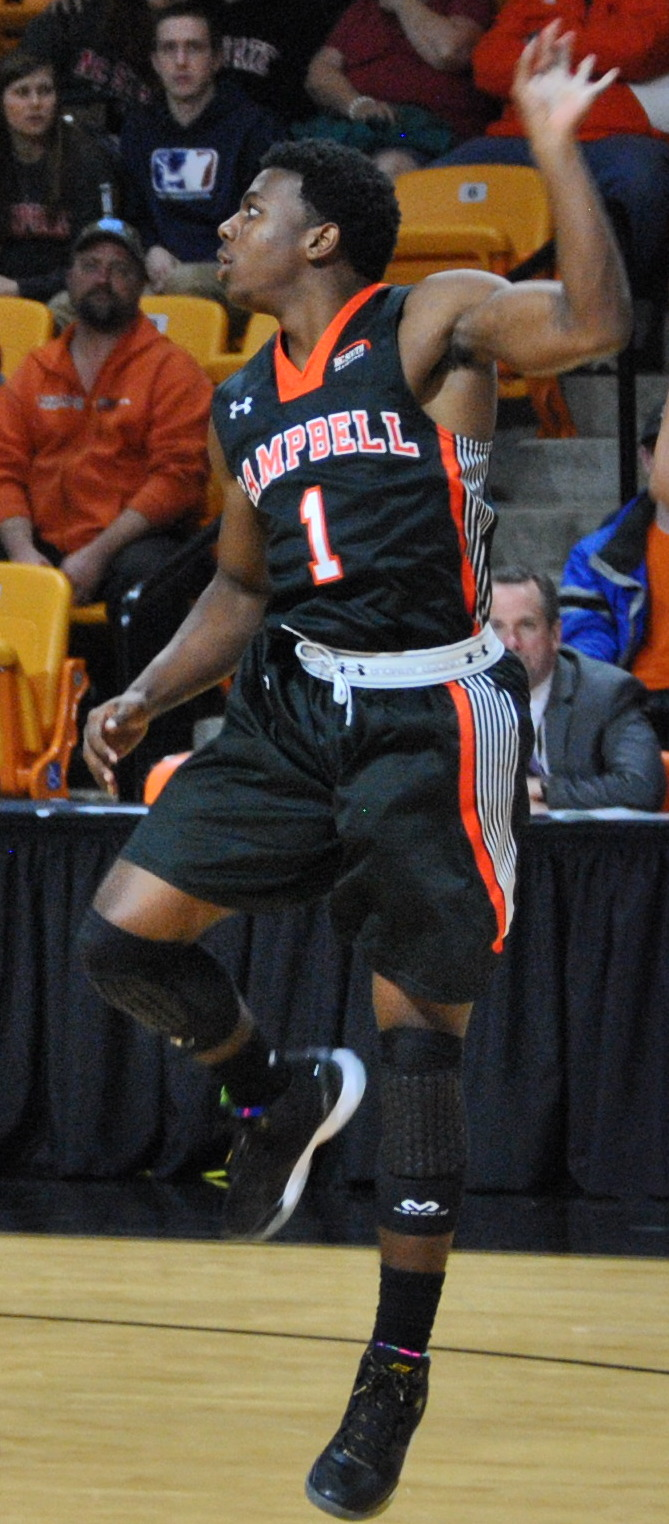
- Clemons with Campbell in 2016

No. 3 – Uralmash Yekaterinburg
- Position: Point guard
- League: VTB United League

Personal information
- Born: July 23, 1997 (age 29) Raleigh, North Carolina, U.S.
- Listed height: 5 ft 9 in (1.75 m)
- Listed weight: 180 lb (82 kg)

Career information
- High school: Millbrook (Raleigh, North Carolina)
- College: Campbell (2015–2019)
- NBA draft: 2019: undrafted
- Playing career: 2019–present

Career history
- 2019–2021: Houston Rockets
- 2019–2020: →Rio Grande Valley Vipers
- 2021–2022: Maine Celtics
- 2022: Windy City Bulls
- 2022–2023: Xinjiang Flying Tigers
- 2023–2024: Windy City Bulls
- 2024–2025: SLUC Nancy
- 2025–2026: EWE Baskets Oldenburg
- 2026–present: Uralmash Yekaterinburg

Career highlights
- Bundesliga Top Scorer (2026); Third-team All-American – USBWA (2019); NCAA scoring champion (2019); Big South Player of the Year (2019); 3× First-team All-Big South (2017–2019); Big South Freshman of the Year (2016); No. 3 retired by Campbell Fighting Camels
- Stats at NBA.com
- Stats at Basketball Reference

Christopher Adam Clemons (born July 23, 1997) is an American professional basketball player for Uralmash Yekaterinburg of the VTB United League. He played college basketball for the Campbell Fighting Camels.

== Early life ==
Growing up in Raleigh, North Carolina, Clemons idolized Allen Iverson and sought to incorporate Iverson's crossover dribble into his playing style. Despite standing 5'9, Clemons could dunk in high school at Millbrook. Campbell coach Kevin McGeehan recruited him due to his confidence and 44-inch vertical leap. In a state tournament game as a senior, Clemons broke the school single-game record with 41 points.

== College career ==
Clemons averaged 18.5 points per game as a freshman at Campbell and was named the Big South Freshman of the Year. Shooting 18-of-32 from the field, Clemons scored 51 points in an 81–79 win over UNC Asheville in the Big South Tournament as a sophomore, breaking the tournament scoring record. He became the fourth player to score 50 points that season. Clemons was named to the First Team All-Big South in his sophomore season. As a sophomore, Clemons averaged 25.1 points per game, second highest in Division I behind Marcus Keene, and took 42.2 percent of his team's shots, the highest percentage in college basketball. With 904 points, Clemons set the school record for points in a season.

Clemons had a season-high 42 points against Liberty on January 23, 2018, and alongside Marcus Burk became the first teammates in NCAA history to each hit 10 threes in a game. He passed the 2,000 point mark in his career on February 7, scoring 33 points in a win against Gardner–Webb. On March 14, Clemons passed Jonathan Rodriguez as Campbell's all-time leading scorer, adding 32 points in a win against Miami (Ohio). Clemons repeated on the First Team All-Big South as a junior and received seven first place votes for conference player of the year. As a junior, Clemons averaged 24.9 points per game, fourth highest in the nation. He helped the Camels go 18–16 and play in the College Basketball Invitational. After the season, Clemons declared for the 2018 NBA draft but did not hire an agent, thus preserving his collegiate eligibility. He decided to withdraw from the draft and return to Campbell.

Coming into his senior season, Clemons was named Preseason Big South Player of the Year. On December 21, 2018, Clemons became the all-time leading scorer in Big South history. He passed VMI guard Reggie Williams' 2,556 career point total in a game against Austin Peay. He led NCAA Division 1 in scoring with 30.1 points per game and became the third highest scorer in college basketball history.

== Professional career ==
=== Houston Rockets (2019–2021) ===
After going undrafted in the 2019 NBA draft, Clemons joined the Houston Rockets for the 2019 NBA Summer League, and later signed an Exhibit 10 contract with the Rockets. On October 17, the Rockets converted him to a two-way player. Clemons made his NBA debut on November 3, scoring 16 points in a 129–100 loss to the Miami Heat. On November 16, with Russell Westbrook and Eric Gordon sidelined due to injury, Clemons scored a career-high 19 points in a win over the Minnesota Timberwolves. On December 27, the Houston Rockets announced that they had converted the contract with Clemons into standard NBA contract. Clemons recorded 14 points and three rebounds on January 10, 2020, in a 113–92 loss to the Oklahoma City Thunder. Clemons had his jersey retired at Campbell during the NBA All-Star Break. On December 15, 2020, in a preseason game against the San Antonio Spurs, Clemons tore his Achilles while on defense. On January 21, 2021, he was waived by the Rockets.

=== Maine Celtics (2021–2022) ===
On October 16, 2021, Clemons signed with the Boston Celtics, but was waived soon thereafter. On October 23, he signed with the Maine Celtics as an affiliate player. Clemons averaged 16.3 points, 4.9 rebounds, 4.1 assists and 1.1 steals per game.

On December 29, 2021, Clemons signed a 10-day contract with the Atlanta Hawks. However, he did not appear in a game for Atlanta. On January 8, 2022, Clemons was reacquired by the Maine Celtics. On January 22, 2022, Clemons set an NBA G League record for most points in a quarter on perfect shooting from the field with 27 points on 9–9 field goal shooting. Later that season he would win the G League Player of the Week on February 13 and G League Player of the month for March.

Clemons joined the Atlanta Hawks for the 2022 NBA Summer League.

=== Windy City Bulls (2022) ===
On September 29, 2022, Clemons' returning player rights were traded by the Celtics to the Windy City Bulls. On October 13, he signed a contract with the Bulls. On November 23, Clemons was bought out by the Bulls.

=== Xinjiang Flying Tigers (2022–2023) ===
In November 2022, Clemons signed with the Xinjiang Flying Tigers of the Chinese Basketball Association.

=== Return to Windy City (2023–2024) ===
On November 2, 2023, Clemons rejoined the Windy City Bulls. However, he was waived on February 1, 2024.

=== SLUC Nancy (2024–2025) ===
On February 17, 2024, Clemons signed with SLUC Nancy of the LNB Pro A.

=== Baskets Oldenburg (2025–2026) ===
On July 21, 2025, he signed with EWE Baskets Oldenburg in the Basketball Bundesliga (BBL). On October 24, 2025, in an 108–85 win over Gladiators Trier, he scored 52 points, a single-game team record and more than any other BBL player in the previous 30 years.

=== Uralmash Yekaterinburg (2026–present) ===
On July 7, 2026, Clemons signed with Uralmash Yekaterinburg of the VTB United League.

== Career statistics ==
Legend
GP	Games played	GS	Games started	MPG	Minutes per game
FG%	Field goal percentage	3P%	3-point field goal percentage	FT%	Free throw percentage
RPG	Rebounds per game	APG	Assists per game	SPG	Steals per game
BPG	Blocks per game	PPG	Points per game	**Bold**	Career high

=== NBA ===
==== Regular season ====
Year	Team	GP	GS	MPG	FG%	3P%	FT%	RPG	APG	SPG	BPG	PPG
2019–20	Houston	33	0	8.8	.401	.346	.909	.9	.8	.2	.1	4.9

==== Playoffs ====
Year	Team	GP	GS	MPG	FG%	3P%	FT%	RPG	APG	SPG	BPG	PPG
2020	Houston	2	0	4.0	.400	.400	.500	1.0	.0	.0	.0	3.5

*	Led NCAA Division I

=== College ===
Year	Team	GP	GS	MPG	FG%	3P%	FT%	RPG	APG	SPG	BPG	PPG
2015–16	Campbell	30	29	32.2	.424	**.374**	.844	3.7	1.8	1.5	.3	18.5
2016–17	Campbell	**36**	**34**	33.5	.447	.354	.825	4.6	2.6	**1.9**	**.5**	25.1
2017–18	Campbell	31	30	34.0	**.452**	.371	.861	4.6	**3.1**	1.6	.3	24.9
2018–19	Campbell	33	33	**36.6**	.448	.357	**.869**	**5.1**	2.8	1.5	.3	**30.1***
Career		130	126	34.1	.444	.363	.852	4.5	2.6	1.6	.4	24.8

== See also ==
- List of NCAA Division I men's basketball career scoring leaders
- List of NCAA Division I men's basketball career free throw scoring leaders
