= Danuel House Jr. =

American basketball player (born 1993)

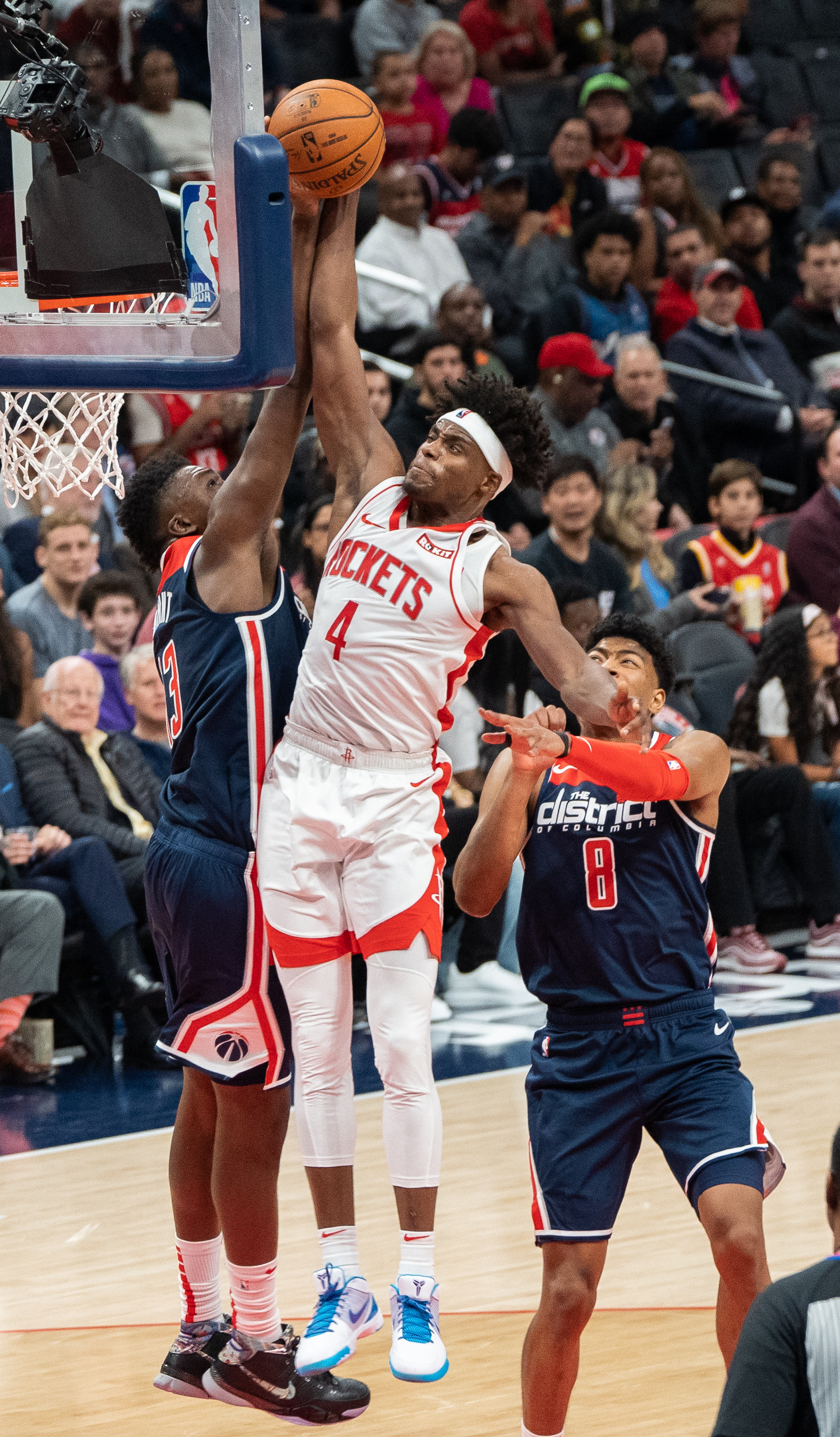
- House with Houston Rockets in 2018

Personal information
- Born: June 7, 1993 (age 33) Houston, Texas, U.S.
- Listed height: 6 ft 6 in (1.98 m)
- Listed weight: 220 lb (100 kg)

Career information
- High school: Hightower (Missouri City, Texas)
- College: Houston (2012–2014); Texas A&M (2014–2016)
- NBA draft: 2016: undrafted
- Playing career: 2016–2024
- Position: Small forward / power forward
- Number: 4, 23, 25, 44

Career history
- 2016–2017: Washington Wizards
- 2016–2017: →Delaware 87ers
- 2017: Rio Grande Valley Vipers
- 2017–2018: Phoenix Suns
- 2017–2018: →Northern Arizona Suns
- 2018: Rio Grande Valley Vipers
- 2018–2021: Houston Rockets
- 2018–2019: →Rio Grande Valley Vipers
- 2021–2022: New York Knicks
- 2022: Utah Jazz
- 2022–2024: Philadelphia 76ers

Career highlights
- AP honorable mention All-American (2016); First-team All-SEC (2015); Second-team All-SEC (2016); C-USA Freshman of the Year (2013); C-USA All-Freshman Team (2013)
- Stats at NBA.com
- Stats at Basketball Reference

Danuel Kennedy House Jr. (born June 7, 1993) is an American former professional basketball player. He played two seasons of college basketball for the Houston Cougars before transferring to the Texas A&M Aggies. During his senior season, House was instrumental in the Aggies' first share of a regular-season Southeastern Conference (SEC) championship, as well as their run to the Sweet Sixteen in the 2016 NCAA tournament.

== High school career ==
House was born in Houston and grew up in the Fourth Ward. He attended Hightower High School in Missouri City, Texas. As a junior, he averaged 13.9 points, 5.4 rebounds, 1.5 steals, 1.1 blocks and 1.3 assists per game and was named All-District 23-5A First-Team honoree. He averaged 26.0 points, 6.2 rebounds, 2.1 assists, 1.3 blocks and 1.5 steals per game as a senior and was one of 10 finalists for the Guy V. Lewis Award, an award given to the best player in the Greater Houston area. That season, the Hightower Hurricanes finished with an overall record of 29–9 and a Regional championship game berth. House was ranked 15th in the 2012 class by ESPNU 100 and 26th overall by Scout.com. House committed to Houston over Ohio State, Baylor, Texas, Georgetown, and Kansas.

== College career ==
=== Houston (2012–2014) ===
House began his collegiate career at Houston, where he averaged 12.4 points per game as a freshman while competing in 33 games with 27 starts. He was named C-USA Freshman of the Year, the first in school history to receive the honor. In the first round of the College Basketball Invitational, House hit the game-winning shot against Texas with 17 seconds left. As a sophomore, he was the Cougars' leading scorer and rebounder with 19.6 points and 9.4 rebounds per game, and led the team to the conference semifinals. After the 2013–14 season, House left the team after coach James Dickey had resigned, and the school granted House's immediate release with the stipulation that he not transfer to another Texas school—a condition the NCAA later refused.

=== Texas A&M (2014–2016) ===
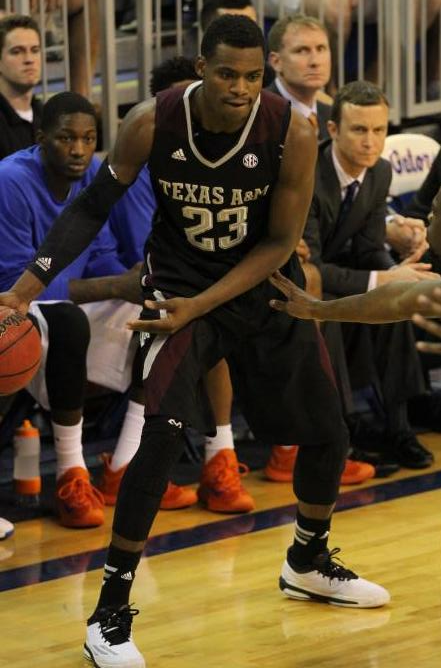
House with the Aggies in 2015

House transferred to Texas A&M and received a waiver from the NCAA to immediately play rather than sit out a year. He averaged 16.2 points per game and earned first-team All-SEC honors. House suffered a foot injury near the end of the season and missed the team's final four games. During his senior season, House averaged 15.6 points, 4.8 rebounds and 2.1 assists per game and scored at least 20 points in nine games. For the first three games of the season, House scored a total of 50 points in wins over USC Upstate, Southeastern Louisiana, and Texas A&M-Corpus Christi. The Aggies went to the Battle 4 Atlantis finals, losing to Syracuse 74–67. Along the way, the Aggies beat former rival Texas and upset No. 10 Gonzaga with House scoring 19 in each contest. The Aggies finished the regular season with 13 wins, sharing the SEC championship with Kentucky. In the SEC tournament, House averaged 17.0 points per game and scored 32 in the championship game against Kentucky, where the Aggies lost 82–77 in overtime. In the first round of the NCAA Tournament, House scored 20 points in 26 minutes to defeat the Green Bay Phoenix 92–65. In the second round, the Aggies faced the #11 seed Northern Iowa Panthers. By the 5:14 mark in the second half, House had not scored any points and ended with 22 in a double-overtime game where the Aggies overcame a 12-point deficit with 44 seconds remaining in regulation to win 92–88. It was the largest last-minute comeback in NCAA basketball history.

== Professional career ==
=== Washington Wizards (2016–2017) ===
After going undrafted in the 2016 NBA draft, House joined the Washington Wizards for the 2016 NBA Summer League. On September 23, 2016, he signed with the Wizards. House made his NBA debut on November 11, 2016, recording one rebound in 50 seconds of action against the Cleveland Cavaliers. On November 30, 2016, he was diagnosed with a fracture in his right wrist and was subsequently ruled out for at least six weeks. On March 1, 2017, he was waived by the Wizards. House appeared in just one game for the Wizards, as he missed 39 games with the right wrist injury and 10 games on assignment to the NBA Development League with the Delaware 87ers.

=== Rio Grande Valley Vipers (2017) ===
Around the start of training camp, he signed up with the Houston Rockets. However, he would be one of the players cut from the final roster at the conclusion of preseason on October 15. He would later be assigned to the Rio Grande Valley Vipers of the newly rebranded NBA G League afterwards. House would play for the squad throughout the month of November and the beginning of December, averaging 17.7 points, 6.3 rebounds, and 2.5 assists per game there.

=== Phoenix Suns (2017–2018) ===
On December 8, 2017, the Phoenix Suns signed House to a two-way contract with the team. Throughout the rest of the season, House would split his playing time there between Phoenix and their NBA G League squad, the Northern Arizona Suns. House would make his debut with the team a day later, scoring two points and recording a single rebound in 11 minutes of play in a close loss against the San Antonio Spurs. On December 16, House would score a season-high 8 points in 15 minutes of playing time in a 108–106 win over the Minnesota Timberwolves. House was later assigned to the Northern Arizona Suns affiliate alongside Davon Reed on December 28, mainly for healing purposes. House then returned to action on January 5, 2018, recording what was at the time a new season-high 9 points in a loss against the San Antonio Spurs. On February 23, his two-way contract expired, meaning he couldn't be allowed to play for Phoenix again until after the NBA G League's first season under its rebranded name concluded. Once that happened, he was allowed to return to Phoenix for the rest of the season. On March 30, House recorded a career-high 8 rebounds in a heartbreaking, buzzer-beating loss against the Houston Rockets. On April 1, House would record a new season-high with 16 points scored alongside 6 rebounds and 3 assists in a 117–107 loss against the Golden State Warriors. Two days later, House recorded 14 points, 6 rebounds, and a career-high 5 assists in a 97–94 win against the Sacramento Kings. On April 6, House would put up his first start in the NBA against the New Orleans Pelicans. Two days later, House would record career-highs of 22 points and 8 rebounds in a 117–100 loss to the Golden State Warriors.

=== Rio Grande Valley Vipers (2018–2019) ===
On June 26, 2018, it was revealed that House would play for the Houston Rockets in the 2018 NBA Summer League, in which he started in all five games. On September 21, 2018, House signed an Exhibit 10 contract with the Golden State Warriors. The Warriors released him on October 12. He then re-joined the Rio Grande Valley Vipers (RGV). In 18 games this season for RGV, he averaged a team-high 20.7 points, 4.6 rebounds, 3.8 assists, and 1.3 steals, including 2.8 made 3-pointers per game.

=== Houston Rockets (2018–2021) ===
On November 26, 2018, the Houston Rockets announced that they had called up House from their NBA G League affiliate, Rio Grande Valley Vipers, but several days later, on December 4, the Houston Rockets announced that House was waived. Two days later, he was signed to a two-way contract by the Rockets. On January 16, he was sent back to Rio Grande after House turned down Houston's contract offers, both of which revolved around signing a three-year deal. In 25 games, House averaged 24.8 minutes, 9.0 points, 3.6 rebounds, and 1.0 assists per game, shooting 39.0 percent from three-point range.

On March 12, 2019, Jonathan Feigen of the Houston Chronicle reported that the Houston Rockets intended to convert House's two-way contract into a standard NBA contract for the remainder of the season. On March 13, 2019, Daryl Morey announced that the contract conversion was official.

On March 15, Chris Paul was rested against the Phoenix Suns, allowing House to join the starting lineup in his first game back. In 35 minutes of play, House Jr. tied his season-high number of points in one game with 18 points. He collected three rebounds and one steal, shot 50% from three-point range and 54.55% from the field overall.

On June 30, House agreed to a three-year, $11.1 million extension. On November 27, 2019, House scored a career-high 23 points in 34 minutes in a 117–108 win against the Miami Heat.

On September 11, 2020, it was announced that House had been expelled from the NBA's bubble in Orlando for violating the league's COVID-19 safety guidelines. House, who had missed two games while the league's investigation was pending, had reportedly had an unauthorized female guest in his hotel room for a span of "multiple hours." Furthermore, the NBA determined that House would be sent home and would not play for the rest of the 2019–20 season.

On December 18, 2021, House was waived by the Rockets.

=== New York Knicks (2021–2022) ===
On December 23, 2021, House signed a 10-day contract with the New York Knicks.

=== Utah Jazz (2022) ===
On January 6, 2022, House signed a 10-day contract with the Utah Jazz. He signed a second 10-day contract with the Jazz on January 18. House signed a third 10-day contract with the Jazz on January 28. On February 11, the team signed him for the rest of the season.

=== Philadelphia 76ers (2022–2024) ===
On July 6, 2022, House signed a two-year, $8.5 million contract with the Philadelphia 76ers.

On February 8, 2024, the 76ers traded House to the Detroit Pistons, who subsequently waived him.

== Career statistics ==
Legend
| GP | Games played | GS | Games started | MPG | Minutes per game |
| FG% | Field goal percentage | 3P% | 3-point field goal percentage | FT% | Free throw percentage |
| RPG | Rebounds per game | APG | Assists per game | SPG | Steals per game |
| BPG | Blocks per game | PPG | Points per game | **Bold** | Career high |

=== NBA ===
==== Regular season ====
| Year | Team | GP | GS | MPG | FG% | 3P% | FT% | RPG | APG | SPG | BPG | PPG |
|---|---|---|---|---|---|---|---|---|---|---|---|---|
| 2016–17 | Washington | 1 | 0 | 1.0 | – | – | – | 1.0 | .0 | .0 | .0 | .0 |
| 2017–18 | Phoenix | 23 | 3 | 17.5 | .434 | .259 | .806 | 3.3 | 1.1 | .3 | .3 | 6.6 |
| 2018–19 | Houston | 39 | 13 | 25.1 | .468 | **.416** | .789 | 3.6 | 1.0 | .5 | .3 | 9.4 |
| 2019–20 | Houston | **63** | **52** | **30.4** | .427 | .363 | .811 | **4.2** | 1.3 | **1.1** | **.5** | **10.5** |
| 2020–21 | Houston | 36 | 23 | 25.9 | .404 | .346 | .651 | 3.7 | **1.9** | .6 | .4 | 8.8 |
| 2021–22 | Houston | 16 | 1 | 14.6 | .338 | .294 | **.895** | 2.7 | 1.2 | .3 | .3 | 4.8 |
| 2021–22 | New York | 1 | 0 | 3.0 | .000 | .000 | – | .0 | .0 | .0 | .0 | .0 |
| 2021–22 | Utah | 25 | 6 | 19.6 | .447 | .415 | .692 | 2.7 | 1.0 | .6 | **.5** | 6.8 |
| 2022–23 | Philadelphia | 56 | 5 | 14.4 | **.472** | .336 | .750 | 1.7 | .8 | .3 | .2 | 4.8 |
| 2023–24 | Philadelphia | 34 | 4 | 15.0 | .448 | .300 | .761 | 1.7 | .8 | .4 | .1 | 4.2 |
| Career | | 294 | 107 | 21.3 | .434 | .359 | .761 | 3.0 | 1.1 | .6 | .3 | 7.3 |

==== Playoffs ====
| Year | Team | GP | GS | MPG | FG% | 3P% | FT% | RPG | APG | SPG | BPG | PPG |
|---|---|---|---|---|---|---|---|---|---|---|---|---|
| 2019 | Houston | 7 | 0 | 20.1 | .297 | .258 | .500 | 3.1 | .1 | .4 | **.3** | 4.9 |
| 2020 | Houston | **9** | **4** | **31.0** | **.435** | **.358** | .769 | **5.8** | **1.4** | **.9** | .0 | **11.4** |
| 2022 | Utah | 6 | 0 | 18.7 | .409 | .200 | .750 | 2.8 | .7 | .0 | .2 | 4.3 |
| 2023 | Philadelphia | 7 | 0 | 6.0 | .429 | .100 | **1.000** | 1.7 | .1 | .0 | .0 | 2.9 |
| Career | | 29 | 4 | 19.8 | .400 | .288 | .700 | 3.6 | .7 | .4 | .1 | 6.3 |

=== College ===
| Year | Team | GP | GS | MPG | FG% | 3P% | FT% | RPG | APG | SPG | BPG | PPG |
|---|---|---|---|---|---|---|---|---|---|---|---|---|
| 2012–13 | Houston | 33 | 27 | 28.6 | **.436** | .316 | **.718** | 4.9 | 1.8 | **.9** | .2 | 12.4 |
| 2013–14 | Houston | 24 | 18 | 28.5 | .428 | .333 | .699 | **5.3** | 1.9 | .8 | **.8** | 13.6 |
| 2014–15 | Texas A&M | 26 | 23 | **32.5** | .417 | **.400** | .643 | 3.8 | **2.1** | .7 | .6 | 14.8 |
| 2015–16 | Texas A&M | **36** | **34** | 30.9 | .396 | .309 | .715 | 4.8 | **2.1** | .5 | .3 | **15.6** |
| Career | | 119 | 102 | 30.1 | .416 | .338 | .699 | 4.7 | 2.0 | .7 | .4 | 14.1 |
