= 2019–20 Houston Rockets season =

NBA professional basketball team season

- Division champions
- Head coach: Mike D'Antoni
- General manager: Daryl Morey
- Owners: Tilman Fertitta
- Arena: Toyota Center

Results
- Record: 44–28 (.611)
- Place: Division: 1st (Southwest); Conference: 4th (Western)
- Playoff finish: Conference semifinals (lost to Lakers 1–4)
- Stats at Basketball Reference

Local media
- Television: AT&T SportsNet Southwest
- Radio: Sportstalk 790

The 2019–20 Houston Rockets season was the 53rd season of the franchise in the National Basketball Association (NBA), and their 49th in the Houston area. On June 6, 2019, the Rockets unveiled a new logo, followed by a new uniform set two weeks later.

After what was an uneventful off-season for the Rockets, failing to land Houston native Jimmy Butler, the Rockets acquired star point guard Russell Westbrook from the Oklahoma City Thunder in exchange for Chris Paul and a trove of future draft considerations, reuniting Westbrook with former Thunder teammate James Harden, who had played his first three seasons with the Thunder and was part of the 2011–12 Thunder team that appeared in the 2012 NBA Finals.

With the San Antonio Spurs missing the playoffs for the first time since the 1996–97 season, the Rockets would hold the longest active playoff streak in the NBA qualifying every year since the 2012–13 season.

In February, Westbrook and Harden became the first teammates in NBA history to average 30+ points and 5+ assists per game.

The February trade deadline deal sending away long-time center Clint Capela represented a unique shift in philosophy by both general manager Daryl Morey and coach Mike D'Antoni. Their "microball" strategy entailed no player over 6-foot-8 starting for the remainder of the season, while relying on the strength of players such as P.J. Tucker (6-foot-5 and 245 pounds), Harden (6-foot-5 and 220 pounds), and Eric Gordon (6-foot-3 and 215 pounds) to withstand taller matchups inside. It required a switch-everything defensive scheme and sacrificed Capela's contribution to rebounding in favor of consistent spacing by employing 3-point shooters such as acquisition Robert Covington in his place.

This marked the team's third straight divisional championship, as well as James Harden's 8th straight All-Star selection as a Rocket.

In the playoffs held at the NBA bubble, the Rockets defeated the Oklahoma City Thunder, Westbrook and Harden's former team, in Game 7 of the first round. However, in the Western Conference semifinals, they would lose in five games to the eventual champion Los Angeles Lakers. This was Houston's last playoff berth until 2025.

== COVID-19 impact ==
The season was suspended by the league officials following the games of March 11 after it was reported that Rudy Gobert tested positive for COVID-19. On June 26 the NBA and National Basketball Players Association finalized a comprehensive plan, and it was announced that the 2019–20 season would resume in the NBA Bubble on July 30, with health and safety precautions and rules enforceable by warning, fine, suspension, or campus ban, including establishing a hotline for players to report violations of COVID-19 restrictions, a single-site campus at Walt Disney World Resort in Orlando, Florida and an intentional goal to take "collective action to combat systemic racism and promote social justice." Fourteen-year NBA veteran player Thabo Sefolosha opted out of continuing on with the team in the wake of the pandemic. Westbrook also tested positive for the virus and the diagnosis was formally announced in July prior to the team heading to Orlando. He flew to Orlando to join the team on July 20 following NBA mandated quarantine requirements and two negative COVID-19 test results. The league's July 20 COVID-19 testing update stated that no players of the 346 at the "NBA bubble" complex had tested positive within the week prior. A July 16 news report stated that the Rockets were the first NBA team publicly known to file a lawsuit to recover COVID-19-related losses by suing Affiliated FM Insurance for denying its business-interruption claim.

== Draft picks ==
The Rockets did not hold any picks for the 2019 NBA draft. This was the third time in franchise history that they did not hold any picks in the draft; the last time was in 1989.

== Roster ==
2019–20 Houston Rockets roster
Players

Pos.	No.	Player	Height	Weight	DOB	From
F/C	5	Bruno Caboclo	6 ft 10 in (2.08 m)	218 lb (99 kg)	1995–09–21	Brazil
C	15	Clint Capela	6 ft 10 in (2.08 m)	256 lb (116 kg)	1994-05-18	Switzerland
F	9	DeMarre Carroll	6 ft 6 in (1.98 m)	215 lb (98 kg)	1986–07–27	Missouri
C	19	Tyson Chandler	7 ft 1 in (2.16 m)	240 lb (109 kg)	1982–10–02	Dominguez HS (CA)
G	3	Chris Clemons	5 ft 9 in (1.75 m)	180 lb (82 kg)	1997–07–23	Campbell
F	33	Robert Covington	6 ft 9 in (2.06 m)	225 lb (102 kg)	1990–12–14	Tennessee State
G	21	Michael Frazier (TW)	6 ft 3 in (1.91 m)	200 lb (91 kg)	1994–03–08	Florida
G	10	Eric Gordon (injured)	6 ft 3 in (1.91 m)	215 lb (98 kg)	1988–12–25	Indiana
F	32	Jeff Green	6 ft 9 in (2.06 m)	235 lb (107 kg)	1986–08–28	Georgetown
G	13	James Harden (C)	6 ft 5 in (1.96 m)	220 lb (100 kg)	1989–08–26	Arizona State
C	55	Isaiah Hartenstein	7 ft 0 in (2.13 m)	250 lb (113 kg)	1998-05-05	Germany
F	4	Danuel House	6 ft 6 in (1.98 m)	220 lb (100 kg)	1993–06–07	Texas A&M
F	12	Luc Mbah a Moute	6 ft 8 in (2.03 m)	230 lb (104 kg)	1986–09–09	UCLA
G	16	Ben McLemore	6 ft 5 in (1.96 m)	195 lb (88 kg)	1993–02–11	Kansas
G/F	–	David Nwaba	6 ft 5 in (1.96 m)	219 lb (99 kg)	1993–01–14	Cal Poly
G	25	Austin Rivers	6 ft 3 in (1.91 m)	200 lb (91 kg)	1992–08–01	Duke
G/F	18	Thabo Sefolosha	6 ft 7 in (2.01 m)	215 lb (98 kg)	1984–05–02	Switzerland
F	17	P. J. Tucker	6 ft 5 in (1.96 m)	245 lb (111 kg)	1985–05–05	Texas
G	0	Russell Westbrook	6 ft 3 in (1.91 m)	200 lb (91 kg)	1988–11–12	UCLA

Coaches
Head coach
- Mike D'Antoni
Assistant(s)
- Matt Brase
- Brett Gunning
- Dan Hartfield
- John Lucas
- Elston Turner

Legend
- (DP) Unsigned draft pick
- (FA) Free agent
- (S) Suspended
- (GL) On assignment to G League affiliate
- (TW) Two-way affiliate player
- Injured

Roster
Updated: 2020–07–08

== Standings ==
=== Division ===
Southwest Division	W	L	PCT	GB	Home	Road	Div	GP
y – Houston Rockets	44	28	.611	–	24‍–‍12	20‍–‍16	8–5	72
x – Dallas Mavericks	43	32	.573	2.5	20‍–‍18	23‍–‍14	10–4	75
pi – Memphis Grizzlies	34	39	.466	10.5	20‍–‍17	14‍–‍22	4–9	73
San Antonio Spurs	32	39	.451	11.5	19‍–‍15	13‍–‍24	7–6	71
New Orleans Pelicans	30	42	.417	14.0	15‍–‍21	15‍–‍21	4–9	72

=== Conference ===
Western Conference
#	Team	W	L	PCT	GB	GP
1	c – Los Angeles Lakers *	52	19	.732	–	71
2	x – Los Angeles Clippers	49	23	.681	3.5	72
3	y – Denver Nuggets *	46	27	.630	7.0	73
4	y – Houston Rockets *	44	28	.611	8.5	72
5	x – Oklahoma City Thunder	44	28	.611	8.5	72
6	x – Utah Jazz	44	28	.611	8.5	72
7	x – Dallas Mavericks	43	32	.573	11.0	75
8	x – Portland Trail Blazers	35	39	.473	18.5	74
9	pi – Memphis Grizzlies	34	39	.466	19.0	73
10	Phoenix Suns	34	39	.466	19.0	73
11	San Antonio Spurs	32	39	.451	20.0	71
12	Sacramento Kings	31	41	.431	21.5	72
13	New Orleans Pelicans	30	42	.417	22.5	72
14	Minnesota Timberwolves	19	45	.297	29.5	64
15	Golden State Warriors	15	50	.231	34.0	65

== Game log ==
=== Preseason ===
2019 preseason game log
Total: 4–2 (home: 2–1; road: 2–1)
Preseason: 4–2 (home: 2–1; road: 2–1)

Game	Date	Team	Score	High points	High rebounds	High assists	Location Attendance	Record
1	September 30	Shanghai Sharks	W 140–71	Clint Capela (25)	Harden, Blossomgame (12)	James Harden (17)	Toyota Center; 16,155	1–0
2	October 4	@ LA Clippers	W 109–96	James Harden (37)	Clint Capela (11)	James Harden (7)	Stan Sheriff Center; 10,300	2–0
3	October 8	@ Toronto	L 129–134	James Harden (34)	Clint Capela (5)	James Harden (7)	Saitama Super Arena; 20,413	2–1
4	October 10	Toronto	W 118–111	Harden, Westbrook (22)	P. J. Tucker (10)	James Harden (9)	Saitama Super Arena; 20,413	3–1
5	October 16	San Antonio	L 114–128	James Harden (40)	James Harden (10)	James Harden (7)	Toyota Center; 17,283	3–2
6	October 18	@ Miami	W 144–133	James Harden (44)	Clint Capela (13)	James Harden (7)	American Airlines Arena; 19,600	4–2

2019–20 season schedule

=== Regular season ===
2019–20 game log
Total: 44–28 (home: 24–12; road: 20–16)
October: 3–1 (home: 2–1; road: 1–0)

Game	Date	Team	Score	High points	High rebounds	High assists	Location Attendance	Record
1	October 24	Milwaukee	L 111–117	Russell Westbrook (24)	Russell Westbrook (16)	James Harden (14)	Toyota Center; 18,055	0–1
2	October 26	New Orleans	W 126–123	James Harden (29)	Russell Westbrook (10)	Russell Westbrook (13)	Toyota Center; 18,055	1–1
3	October 28	Oklahoma City	W 116–112	James Harden (40)	Russell Westbrook (12)	James Harden (7)	Toyota Center; 18,055	2–1
4	October 30	@ Washington	W 159–158	James Harden (59)	Russell Westbrook (10)	Russell Westbrook (12)	Capital One Arena; 20,476	3–1

November: 10–5 (home: 6–1; road: 4–4)

Game	Date	Team	Score	High points	High rebounds	High assists	Location Attendance	Record
5	November 1	@ Brooklyn	L 116–123	James Harden (26)	Chandler, Tucker (8)	Harden, Westbrook (8)	Barclays Center; 17,732	3–2
6	November 3	@ Miami	L 100–129	James Harden (29)	Clint Capela (7)	Russell Westbrook (6)	American Airlines Arena; 19,724	3–3
7	November 4	@ Memphis	W 107–100	James Harden (44)	Clint Capela (13)	James Harden (6)	FedExForum; 14,197	4–3
8	November 6	Golden State	W 129–112	James Harden (36)	Clint Capela (16)	James Harden (13)	Toyota Center; 18,055	5–3
9	November 9	@ Chicago	W 117–94	James Harden (42)	Clint Capela (20)	James Harden (9)	United Center; 20,482	6–3
10	November 11	@ New Orleans	W 122–116	James Harden (39)	Clint Capela (20)	James Harden (9)	Smoothie King Center; 16,695	7–3
11	November 13	L. A. Clippers	W 102–93	James Harden (47)	Clint Capela (20)	James Harden (7)	Toyota Center; 18,055	8–3
12	November 15	Indiana	W 111–102	James Harden (44)	P. J. Tucker (12)	Russell Westbrook (6)	Toyota Center; 18,055	9–3
13	November 16	@ Minnesota	W 125–105	James Harden (49)	Isaiah Hartenstein (16)	James Harden (6)	Target Center; 18,978	10–3
14	November 18	Portland	W 132–108	James Harden (36)	Clint Capela (20)	Russell Westbrook (10)	Toyota Center; 18,055	11–3
15	November 20	@ Denver	L 95–105	James Harden (27)	Clint Capela (21)	James Harden (7)	Pepsi Center; 17,778	11–4
16	November 22	@ L. A. Clippers	L 119–122	James Harden (37)	Clint Capela (19)	James Harden (12)	Staples Center; 19,068	11–5
17	November 24	Dallas	L 123–137	James Harden (32)	Clint Capela (23)	James Harden (11)	Toyota Center; 18,055	11–6
18	November 27	Miami	W 117–108	James Harden (34)	Russell Westbrook (9)	Russell Westbrook (7)	Toyota Center; 18,055	12–6
19	November 30	Atlanta	W 158–111	James Harden (60)	Ben McLemore (13)	Harden, Westbrook (8)	Toyota Center; 18,055	13–6

December: 10–5 (home: 4–2; road: 6–3)

Game	Date	Team	Score	High points	High rebounds	High assists	Location Attendance	Record
20	December 3	@ San Antonio	L 133–135 (2OT)	James Harden (50)	Clint Capela (21)	Russell Westbrook (10)	AT&T Center; 18,354	13–7
21	December 5	@ Toronto	W 119–109	Ben McLemore (28)	Westbrook, Capela (13)	Russell Westbrook (11)	Scotiabank Arena; 19,800	14–7
22	December 7	Phoenix	W 115–109	James Harden (34)	Russell Westbrook (14)	Russell Westbrook (11)	Toyota Center; 18,055	15–7
23	December 9	Sacramento	L 118–119	Russell Westbrook (34)	P. J. Tucker (19)	James Harden (10)	Toyota Center; 18,055	15–8
24	December 11	@ Cleveland	W 116–110	James Harden (55)	Clint Capela (13)	James Harden (8)	Rocket Mortgage FieldHouse; 17,122	16–8
25	December 13	@ Orlando	W 130–107	James Harden (54)	Tucker, Capela (11)	James Harden (7)	Amway Center; 16,335	17–8
26	December 14	Detroit	L 107–115	James Harden (39)	Clint Capela (19)	James Harden (7)	Toyota Center; 18,055	17–9
27	December 16	San Antonio	W 109–107	Russell Westbrook (31)	Clint Capela (15)	James Harden (7)	Toyota Center; 18,055	18–9
28	December 19	@ L. A. Clippers	W 122–117	Russell Westbrook (40)	P. J. Tucker (12)	James Harden (10)	Staples Center; 19,068	19–9
29	December 21	@ Phoenix	W 139–125	James Harden (47)	Clint Capela (17)	Russell Westbrook (10)	Talking Stick Resort Arena; 16,061	20–9
30	December 23	@ Sacramento	W 113–104	James Harden (34)	Clint Capela (14)	Russell Westbrook (6)	Golden 1 Center; 17,583	21–9
31	December 25	@ Golden State	L 104–116	Russell Westbrook (30)	Russell Westbrook (11)	James Harden (11)	Chase Center; 18,064	21–10
32	December 28	Brooklyn	W 108–98	James Harden (44)	Isaiah Hartenstein (13)	Russell Westbrook (7)	Toyota Center; 18,306	22–10
33	December 29	@ New Orleans	L 112–127	Danuel House (22)	Isaiah Hartenstein (9)	Chris Clemons (9)	Smoothie King Center; 17,712	22–11
34	December 31	Denver	W 130–104	James Harden (35)	Isaiah Hartenstein (12)	Russell Westbrook (7)	Toyota Center; 18,055	23–11

January: 7–7 (home: 4–3; road: 3–4)

Game	Date	Team	Score	High points	High rebounds	High assists	Location Attendance	Record
35	January 3	Philadelphia	W 118–108	James Harden (44)	Clint Capela (14)	James Harden (11)	Toyota Center; 18,055	24–11
36	January 8	@ Atlanta	W 122–115	James Harden (41)	Clint Capela (22)	James Harden (10)	State Farm Arena; 16,514	25–11
37	January 9	@ Oklahoma City	L 92–113	Russell Westbrook (34)	Clint Capela (11)	Russell Westbrook (5)	Chesapeake Energy Arena; 18,203	25–12
38	January 11	Minnesota	W 139–109	James Harden (32)	Isaiah Hartenstein (15)	Russell Westbrook (10)	Toyota Center; 18,055	26–12
39	January 14	@ Memphis	L 110–121	James Harden (41)	Clint Capela (16)	James Harden (6)	FedExForum; 16,181	26–13
40	January 15	Portland	L 107–117	Russell Westbrook (31)	Clint Capela (18)	Russell Westbrook (12)	Toyota Center; 18,055	26–14
41	January 18	L. A. Lakers	L 115–124	Russell Westbrook (35)	Clint Capela (12)	Westbrook, Harden (7)	Toyota Center; 18,055	26–15
42	January 20	Oklahoma City	L 107–112	Russell Westbrook (32)	Russell Westbrook (11)	Russell Westbrook (12)	Toyota Center; 18,055	26–16
43	January 22	Denver	W 121–105	Russell Westbrook (28)	Russell Westbrook (16)	Russell Westbrook (8)	Toyota Center; 18,055	27–16
44	January 24	@ Minnesota	W 131–124	Russell Westbrook (45)	Clint Capela (9)	Russell Westbrook (10)	Target Center; 16,101	28–16
45	January 26	@ Denver	L 110–117	Russell Westbrook (32)	Clint Capela (12)	Russell Westbrook (7)	Pepsi Center; 19,520	28–17
46	January 27	@ Utah	W 126–117	Eric Gordon (50)	Danuel House (11)	P. J. Tucker (5)	Vivint Smart Home Arena; 18,306	29–17
47	January 29	@ Portland	L 112–125	Russell Westbrook (39)	Russell Westbrook (10)	Russell Westbrook (6)	Moda Center; 19,393	29–18
48	January 31	Dallas	W 128–121	James Harden (35)	James Harden (16)	Russell Westbrook (9)	Toyota Center; 18,055	30–18

February: 9–2 (home: 5–1; road: 4–1)

Game	Date	Team	Score	High points	High rebounds	High assists	Location Attendance	Record
49	February 2	New Orleans	W 117–109	James Harden (40)	Danuel House (12)	James Harden (9)	Toyota Center; 18,055	31–18
50	February 4	Charlotte	W 125–110	James Harden (40)	P. J. Tucker (10)	James Harden (12)	Toyota Center; 18,055	32–18
51	February 6	@ L. A. Lakers	W 121–111	Russell Westbrook (41)	Covington, Westbrook (8)	James Harden (7)	Staples Center; 18,997	33–18
52	February 7	@ Phoenix	L 91–127	James Harden (32)	Danuel House (6)	James Harden (5)	Talking Stick Resort Arena; 17,043	33–19
53	February 9	Utah	L 113–114	Russell Westbrook (39)	James Harden (10)	James Harden (10)	Toyota Center; 18,055	33–20
54	February 11	Boston	W 116–105	James Harden (42)	Russell Westbrook (10)	James Harden (7)	Toyota Center; 18,055	34–20
55	February 20	@ Golden State	W 135–105	James Harden (29)	Covington, Tucker, Westbrook (5)	Harden, Westbrook (10)	Chase Center; 18,064	35–20
56	February 22	@ Utah	W 120–110	James Harden (38)	Robert Covington (12)	James Harden (7)	Vivint Smart Home Arena; 18,306	36–20
57	February 24	New York	W 123–112	James Harden (37)	Robert Covington (7)	James Harden (9)	Toyota Center; 18,055	37–20
58	February 26	Memphis	W 140–112	Russell Westbrook (33)	Russell Westbrook (9)	Russell Westbrook (8)	Toyota Center; 18,055	38–20
59	February 29	@ Boston	W 111–110 (OT)	Russell Westbrook (41)	Robert Covington (16)	James Harden (8)	TD Garden; 19,156	39–20

March: 1–4 (home: 1–2; road: 0–2)

Game	Date	Team	Score	High points	High rebounds	High assists	Location Attendance	Record
60	March 2	@ New York	L 123–125	James Harden (35)	Robert Covington (13)	James Harden (8)	Madison Square Garden; 18,142	39–21
61	March 5	L. A. Clippers	L 105–120	Russell Westbrook (29)	Russell Westbrook (15)	Russell Westbrook (5)	Toyota Center; 18,055	39–22
62	March 7	@ Charlotte	L 99–108	James Harden (30)	James Harden (10)	James Harden (14)	Spectrum Center; 19,159	39–23
63	March 8	Orlando	L 106–126	Russell Westbrook (24)	Russell Westbrook (8)	James Harden (6)	Toyota Center; 18,055	39–24
64	March 10	Minnesota	W 117–111	James Harden (37)	P. J. Tucker (11)	Harden, Westbrook (7)	Toyota Center; 18,055	40–24

Seeding games: 4–4 (home: 2–2; road: 2–2)

Game	Date	Team	Score	High points	High rebounds	High assists	Location Attendance	Record
65	July 31	@ Dallas	W 153–149 (OT)	James Harden (49)	Covington, Westbrook (11)	Harden, Westbrook (8)	The Arena; No In-Person Attendance	41–24
66	August 2	Milwaukee	W 120–116	Russell Westbrook (31)	Covington, Harden (7)	Russell Westbrook (8)	The Arena; No In-Person Attendance	42–24
67	August 4	@ Portland	L 102–110	James Harden (23)	Covington, Tucker (8)	Harden, Westbrook (9)	The Arena; No In-Person Attendance	42–25
68	August 6	L. A. Lakers	W 113–97	James Harden (39)	James Harden (8)	James Harden (12)	The Arena; No In-Person Attendance	43–25
69	August 9	@ Sacramento	W 129–112	Austin Rivers (41)	Robert Covington (13)	James Harden (7)	HP Field House; No In-Person Attendance	44–25
70	August 11	@ San Antonio	L 105–123	Russell Westbrook (20)	Robert Covington (9)	Russell Westbrook (6)	HP Field House; No In-Person Attendance	44–26
71	August 12	Indiana	L 104–108	James Harden (45)	James Harden (17)	James Harden (9)	The Arena; No In-Person Attendance	44–27
72	August 14	Philadelphia	L 96–134	James Harden (27)	Bruno Caboclo (6)	James Harden (10)	The Arena; No In-Person Attendance	44–28

Cancelled games

Game	Date	Team	Score	High points	High rebounds	High assists	Location Attendance	Record
65	March 12	@ LA Lakers					Staples Center	
66	March 15	@ Portland					Moda Center	
67	March 17	Cleveland					Toyota Center	
68	March 19	Sacramento					Toyota Center	
69	March 21	Chicago					Toyota Center	
70	March 23	@ Dallas					American Airlines Center	
71	March 25	@ Milwaukee					Fiserv Forum	
72	March 27	@ Indiana					Bankers Life Fieldhouse	
73	March 29	@ Detroit					Little Caesars Arena	
74	March 31	@ Philadelphia					Wells Fargo Center	
75	April 2	Golden State					Toyota Center	
76	April 5	Toronto					Toyota Center	
77	April 7	@ Dallas					American Airlines Center	
78	April 8	San Antonio					Toyota Center	
79	April 10	Washington					Toyota Center	
80	April 12	@ San Antonio					AT&T Center	
81	April 13	Phoenix					Toyota Center	
82	April 15	Memphis					Toyota Center	

2019–20 season schedule

=== Playoffs ===
2020 playoff game log
Total: 5–7 (home: 4–2; road: 1–5)
First round: 4–3 (home: 4–0; road: 0–3)

Game	Date	Team	Score	High points	High rebounds	High assists	Location Attendance	Series
1	August 18	Oklahoma City	W 123–108	James Harden (37)	James Harden (11)	Danuel House (5)	HP Field House; No In-Person Attendance	1–0
2	August 20	Oklahoma City	W 111–98	James Harden (21)	Danuel House (9)	James Harden (9)	The Arena; No In-Person Attendance	2–0
3	August 22	@ Oklahoma City	L 107–119 (OT)	James Harden (38)	Danuel House (10)	James Harden (8)	HP Field House; No In-Person Attendance	2–1
4	August 24	@ Oklahoma City	L 114–117	James Harden (32)	P. J. Tucker (11)	James Harden (15)	The Arena; No In-Person Attendance	2–2
5	August 29	Oklahoma City	W 114–80	James Harden (31)	Jeff Green (10)	Russell Westbrook (7)	HP Field House; No In-Person Attendance	3–2
6	August 31	@ Oklahoma City	L 100–104	James Harden (32)	P. J. Tucker (11)	James Harden (7)	The Arena; No In-Person Attendance	3–3
7	September 2	Oklahoma City	W 104–102	Covington, Gordon (21)	Robert Covington (10)	James Harden (9)	The Arena; No In-Person Attendance	4–3

Conference Semi-finals: 1–4 (home: 0–2; road: 1–2)

Game	Date	Team	Score	High points	High rebounds	High assists	Location Attendance	Series
1	September 4	@ L. A. Lakers	W 112–97	James Harden (36)	Tucker, Westbrook (9)	Russell Westbrook (6)	The Arena; No In-Person Attendance	1–0
2	September 6	@ L. A. Lakers	L 109–117	James Harden (27)	Russell Westbrook (13)	James Harden (7)	The Arena; No In-Person Attendance	1–1
3	September 8	L. A. Lakers	L 102–112	James Harden (33)	James Harden (9)	James Harden (9)	The Arena; No In-Person Attendance	1–2
4	September 10	L. A. Lakers	L 100–110	Russell Westbrook (25)	Jeff Green (7)	James Harden (10)	The Arena; No In-Person Attendance	1–3
5	September 12	@ L. A. Lakers	L 96–119	James Harden (30)	James Harden (6)	Russell Westbrook (6)	The Arena; No In-Person Attendance	1–4

2020 playoff schedule

== Player statistics ==
Legend
GP	Games played	GS	Games started	MPG	Minutes per game
FG%	Field-goal percentage	3P%	3-point field-goal percentage	FT%	Free-throw percentage
RPG	Rebounds per game	APG	Assists per game	SPG	Steals per game
BPG	Blocks per game	PPG	Points per game

=== Regular season ===
Houston Rockets statistics
Player	GP	GS	MPG	FG%	3P%	FT%	RPG	APG	SPG	BPG	PPG
P. J. Tucker	72	72	34.3	.415	.358	.813	6.6	1.6	1.1	.5	6.9
Ben McLemore	71	23	22.8	.444	.400	.746	2.2	.8	.6	.2	10.1
James Harden	68	68	36.5	.444	.355	.865	6.6	7.5	1.8	.9	34.3
Austin Rivers	68	4	23.4	.421	.356	.703	2.6	1.7	.7	.1	8.8
Danuel House Jr.	63	52	30.4	.427	.363	.811	4.2	1.3	1.1	.5	10.5
Russell Westbrook	57	57	35.9	.472	.258	.763	7.9	7.0	1.6	.4	27.2
Thabo Sefolosha	41	0	10.6	.407	.278	.375	2.3	.6	.6	.3	2.2
Clint Capela	39	39	32.8	.629		.529	13.8	1.2	.8	1.8	13.9
Eric Gordon	36	15	28.2	.369	.317	.766	2.0	1.5	.6	.4	14.4
Chris Clemons	33	0	8.8	.401	.346	.909	.9	.8	.3	.2	4.9
Tyson Chandler	26	5	8.4	.778		.462	2.5	.2	.2	.3	1.3
Isaiah Hartenstein	23	2	11.6	.657	.000	.679	3.9	.8	.4	.5	4.7
Robert Covington^{†}	22	21	33.0	.392	.315	.800	8.0	1.5	1.6	2.2	11.6
Jeff Green^{†}	18	2	22.6	.564	.354	.857	2.9	1.7	.8	.5	12.2
Gary Clark^{†}	18	0	11.8	.390	.353	.857	2.2	.7	.1	.4	3.9
Michael Frazier II	13	0	11.2	.241	.174	.643	.8	.2	.2	.0	2.1
DeMarre Carroll^{†}	9	0	17.2	.432	.250	.773	2.7	1.6	.7	.3	6.0
Bruno Caboclo^{†}	8	0	6.5	.500	.250	1.000	2.0	.3	.6	.6	3.5
Luc Mbah a Moute	3	0	8.3	.400	.000	.500	.7	.0	.7	.0	1.7
Ryan Anderson	2	0	7.0	.286	.200		3.5	1.0	.5	.0	2.5
William Howard	2	0	6.5	.000	.000		1.0	.5	.0	.0	.0

=== Playoffs ===
Houston Rockets statistics
Player	GP	GS	MPG	FG%	3P%	FT%	RPG	APG	SPG	BPG	PPG
James Harden	12	12	37.3	.478	.333	.845	5.6	7.7	1.5	.8	29.6
P. J. Tucker	12	12	34.5	.398	.373		7.2	1.5	1.1	.3	7.9
Eric Gordon	12	12	34.2	.409	.322	.875	2.7	3.0	.8	.6	17.3
Robert Covington	12	12	31.6	.495	.500	.857	5.0	1.3	2.5	1.1	11.2
Jeff Green	12	0	28.4	.495	.426	.824	5.0	1.6	.5	.5	11.6
Austin Rivers	12	0	17.6	.311	.257	.769	2.5	1.3	.6	.1	4.8
Ben McLemore	11	0	11.8	.375	.389		1.0	.5	.4	.0	4.0
Danuel House Jr.	9	4	31.0	.435	.358	.769	5.8	1.4	.9	.0	11.4
Russell Westbrook	8	8	32.8	.421	.242	.531	7.0	4.6	1.5	.3	17.9
Michael Frazier II	4	0	3.0	.250	.500		1.0	.5	.0	.0	.8
Chris Clemons	2	0	4.0	.400	.400	.500	1.0	.0	.0	.0	3.5
Bruno Caboclo	2	0	3.5	.500	.000		1.5	.0	.5	.0	1.0
DeMarre Carroll	2	0	3.0	.500			1.5	.5	.0	.0	1.0
Tyson Chandler	1	0	0.0			.000	.0	.0	.0	.0	.0

- ^{†} Denotes player spent time with another team in the season. Stats reflect time with the Rockets only.

== Transactions ==
=== Trades ===
July 16, 2019	To Houston Rockets Russell Westbrook	To Oklahoma City Thunder Chris Paul; 2024 and 2026 protected first-round picks First-round pick swaps in 2021 and 2025
February 5, 2020	To Denver Nuggets Keita Bates-Diop (from Minnesota); Shabazz Napier (from Minnesota); Noah Vonleh (from Minnesota); Gerald Green (from Houston); 2020 HOU first-round pick	To Atlanta Hawks Clint Capela (from Houston); Nene (from Houston)
February 5, 2020	To Houston Rockets Robert Covington (from Minnesota); Jordan Bell (from Minnesota); 2024 ATL second-round pick	To Minnesota Timberwolves Malik Beasley (from Denver); Juan Hernangómez (from Denver); Jarred Vanderbilt (from Denver); Evan Turner (from Atlanta); 2020 ATL first-round pick
February 6, 2020	To Houston Rockets Bruno Caboclo	To Memphis Grizzlies Jordan Bell; Second-round pick swap in 2023

=== Free agency ===
==== Re-signed ====
Player	Signed	Contract
Danuel House	July 16, 2019	3-yr, $11.15M s
Austin Rivers	July 16, 2019	2-yr minimum salary ($4,543,981) 2020–1 player option
Gerald Green	July 22, 2019	1-yr minimum salary ($2,594,753)
Eric Gordon	September 4, 2019	4-yr/$75.6M extension 2023–4 not guaranteed

==== Additions ====
Player	Signed	Former team
William McDowell-White	July 3, 2019	(Germany) Brose Bamberg
Shamorie Ponds	July 3, 2019	St. John's Red Storm
Chris Clemons	July 5, 2019	Campbell Fighting Camels
Tyson Chandler	July 18, 2019	Los Angeles Lakers
Ben McLemore	July 23, 2019	Sacramento Kings
Anthony Bennett	July 25, 2019	Agua Caliente Clippers
Thabo Sefolosha	September 23, 2019	Utah Jazz
Ryan Anderson	September 27, 2019	Miami Heat
Jeff Green	February 18, 2020	Utah Jazz
DeMarre Carroll	February 20, 2020	San Antonio Spurs
Luc Mbah a Moute	July 7, 2020	Los Angeles Clippers

==== Subtractions ====
Player	Reason left	New team
Kenneth Faried	Free agency	Zhenjiang Lions
Deyonta Davis	Waived	Santa Cruz Warriors
Chris Chiozza	Waived	Washington Wizards
William McDowell-White	Waived	Rio Grande Valley Vipers
Anthony Bennett	Waived	—
Shamorie Ponds	Waived	Toronto Raptors / Raptors 905
Ray Spalding	Waived	Rio Grande Valley Vipers
Jaron Blossomgame	Waived	Rio Grande Valley Vipers
