= 2020 NBA playoffs =

North American basketball tournament

2020 NBA Playoffs
- A logo used by The Walt Disney Company promoting its hosting of the playoffs at Walt Disney World, using the resort's original 1971 to 1994 logo below.

Tournament details
- City: Bay Lake, Florida
- Venue: ESPN Wide World of Sports Complex at Walt Disney World Resort
- Dates: August 17 – October 11, 2020
- Season: 2019–20
- Teams: 16

Final positions
- Champions: Los Angeles Lakers (17th title)
- Runners-up: Miami Heat
- Semifinalists: Denver Nuggets; Boston Celtics

Tournament statistics
- Scoring leader(s): LeBron James (Lakers) (27.6 PPG)

Awards
- MVP: LeBron James (Lakers)

The 2020 NBA playoffs was the postseason tournament of the National Basketball Association's 2019–20 season. The tournament ended with the Western Conference champion Los Angeles Lakers defeating the Eastern Conference champion Miami Heat in 4 games to 2 to win their first championship since 2010. The playoffs were originally scheduled to begin on April 18. However, the league suspended the season on March 11, 2020, hours after the COVID-19 outbreak was declared a pandemic by the World Health Organization and after Utah Jazz center Rudy Gobert tested positive for the virus.

On June 4, the NBA Board of Governors approved a plan to restart the season on July 31 in the NBA Bubble. This proposal was then approved by members of the National Basketball Players Association on June 5. Under this plan, the 22 top teams in the league at the time of the suspension (all the teams who had a mathematical chance at making the playoffs under the 82-game season) played eight additional regular season games to determine playoff seeding, with 16 of those teams playing in a conventional postseason tournament. If the ninth seed within a conference would have finished the regular season within four games of the eighth seed, they would have then competed in a play–in series. The last time a play-in game was played to determine a playoff spot was in 1956. The NBA would institute a Play-in tournament for the 7-8th seeds the following season due to the regular season being only 72 games. The following regular season and beyond would include a Play-in Tournament.

As part of the bubble, all playoff games were held at the ESPN Wide World of Sports Complex inside Walt Disney World in Bay Lake, Florida.

All three games that were scheduled to take place on August 26 were postponed by a wildcat strike, in response to the shooting of Jacob Blake in Kenosha, Wisconsin, with the Milwaukee Bucks being the first team not to take the court prior to their game five matchup against the Orlando Magic. The games on August 27 and 28 were also postponed, with games resuming on August 29.

The Toronto Raptors were defending champions but lost in the Eastern Conference semifinals round to the Boston Celtics. None of the teams that made it to the conference finals in the 2019 NBA playoffs made the conference finals in 2020. These were the first playoffs since 1997 without the San Antonio Spurs, as they were eliminated from playoff contention on August 14, 2020, ending what was then the longest active playoff streak in both the NBA and other four major sports leagues in North America.

== Overview ==
=== Western Conference ===
- The Houston Rockets entered their eighth consecutive postseason.
- The Portland Trail Blazers entered their seventh consecutive postseason. They also became the first Western Conference team since 1997 to qualify for the playoffs despite posting a losing record.
- The Los Angeles Lakers made the playoffs for the first time in seven years.
- The Dallas Mavericks made the playoffs for the first time in four years.
- The Golden State Warriors missed the playoffs for the first time in eight years.
- Despite being invited to the bubble, the San Antonio Spurs missed the playoffs for the first time in twenty-three years. This was only the fifth time since the merger that the Spurs missed the playoffs.
- Despite the Phoenix Suns going a perfect 8–0 in the bubble, they missed the playoffs due to the Grizzlies defeating the Bucks and the Blazers defeating the Nets earlier in the day.

=== Eastern Conference ===
- The Toronto Raptors entered their seventh consecutive postseason.
- The Boston Celtics entered their sixth consecutive postseason.
- The Indiana Pacers entered their fifth consecutive postseason.
- The Milwaukee Bucks entered their fourth consecutive postseason.
- The Orlando Magic entered their second consecutive postseason.
- The Brooklyn Nets entered their second consecutive postseason.
- The Miami Heat returned to the postseason after a one-year absence.

=== First round ===
- This was the first time since 2003 that both No. 1 seeds (the Milwaukee Bucks and the Los Angeles Lakers) from each conference lost their opening game of the playoffs.
- LeBron James became the first player with 20+ points, 15+ rebounds, and 15+ assists in an NBA playoff game.
- The Boston Celtics swept the Philadelphia 76ers in the first round, marking the 44th straight year a sweep occurred in the NBA playoffs. The last year a sweep did not occur in the playoffs was 1976.
- The Toronto Raptors swept the Brooklyn Nets, making it their first series sweep in franchise history, leaving the Los Angeles Clippers as the only remaining team that has never swept a series in the playoffs.
- With their first round sweep of the Indiana Pacers, the Miami Heat swept a playoff series for the first time since 2014.
- Donovan Mitchell and Jamal Murray joined Michael Jordan and Allen Iverson as the only players to have multiple 50–point games in a single playoff series.
- This was the first time in NBA playoff history that two players on opposing teams (Donovan Mitchell of the Utah Jazz and Jamal Murray of the Denver Nuggets) tallied 50+ points in the same game.
- Luka Dončić joined Charles Barkley and Oscar Robertson as the only players with 40+ points, 15+ rebounds, 10+ assists in an NBA playoff game.
- Luka Dončić joined Michael Jordan, LeBron James, Kawhi Leonard, and Damian Lillard as the only players to score 40+ points and hit a buzzer–beater in a playoff game.
- The Milwaukee Bucks were the first team in the playoffs to refuse to play a game over racial injustice in the wake of the shooting of Jacob Blake in Kenosha, Wisconsin. The players described their actions as a "boycott", although commentators have pointed out that the event was a strike. It is the first time an NBA team refused to play a game since the Boston Celtics protested for racial justice in 1961.
- Kawhi Leonard was the first player to have 30+ points, 10+ rebounds, 5+ assists and 5+ steals in a playoff game since Gary Payton in 2000.
- The Nuggets–Jazz series was the first of the 2020 playoffs to have a Game 7, making it the 21st consecutive NBA postseason with a Game 7. The last time a Game 7 did not take place in the playoffs was 1999.
- Jamal Murray was the first player to have three straight playoff games with 40+ points since Allen Iverson in 2001.
- The Denver Nuggets became just the 12th team in NBA history to come back from a 3–1 series deficit, when they defeated the Utah Jazz in the Western Conference first round. They were the first team to come back from a 3–1 series deficit since the Cleveland Cavaliers did so in the 2016 NBA Finals.
- Luguentz Dort became the youngest player and first undrafted player to score 30+ points in a Game 7.

=== Conference semifinals ===
- Game 2 between the Miami Heat and Milwaukee Bucks was the first playoff game since Game 1 of the 1979 NBA Finals to be decided by free throws with time expired.
- This was the first time that the top two seeds in a conference (the Milwaukee Bucks and the Toronto Raptors in the Eastern Conference) were both down 0–2 in a best–of–7 series.
- This was the first time since 2013 that the fifth seed (Miami Heat) beat the first seed (Milwaukee Bucks) 4–1 in the conference semifinals.
- Despite all the games being in the same location, the Celtics–Raptors series was the first series in NBA history where the (designated) road team won every game of a best–of–seven series. The only other instances when this had happened in major North American sports leagues history are the 2019 World Series and the 2023 American League Championship Series, in which the Houston Astros lost both series.
- With their conference semifinals victory over the Los Angeles Clippers, the Denver Nuggets also became the thirteenth NBA team to overcome a 3–1 deficit in the NBA playoffs, and the first time that an NBA team overcame a 3–1 deficit twice in the same playoffs. This would be the last NBA playoff series where a team won three straight games to come back from a 3–1 deficit until 2026, when the Philadelphia 76ers overcame a 3–1 deficit to beat the Boston Celtics in the first round.

=== Conference finals ===
- This was the first time that neither the first seed nor the second seed were in the Eastern Conference finals. By coincidence, this would happen again the very next year.
- Tyler Herro set the NBA rookie conference finals scoring record by scoring a career-high 37 points off the bench in game 4 of the Eastern Conference finals against the Boston Celtics. The record was previously held by Andrew Toney who scored 35 in 1981. Herro's 37 points are the second-most ever scored by a player aged 20 or younger in a playoff game, only behind Magic Johnson's 42 points back in 1980.
- With their Eastern Conference finals victory over the Boston Celtics, the Miami Heat became the first 5th seed or lower team to advance to the NBA Finals since the 1999 New York Knicks became the first eighth seed to make the NBA Finals. Ironically, the Knicks eliminated the Heat en route to their 1999 NBA Finals appearance.
- With their loss to the Los Angeles Lakers, the Denver Nuggets became the first team in NBA history to overcome a 3–1 series deficit on the road (which they did in the previous round) and not win the NBA championship (the previous three teams to do this, the 1968 Boston Celtics, the 1995 Houston Rockets, and the 2016 Cleveland Cavaliers, all won the NBA championship). The Philadelphia 76ers joined them in 2026.

=== NBA Finals ===
- This was the first time that both teams in the NBA Finals failed to make the playoffs in the previous season.
- Andre Iguodala reached the NBA Finals for the sixth consecutive year, joining LeBron James and James Jones as the only players to do so with two different teams.
- Before this season, the last time the Heat reached the NBA Finals was in 2014, after which LeBron James ended a four-year stint with the team. James became the second player (after Wilt Chamberlain in 1967) to win MVP with a franchise before later playing against that franchise in the Finals. James was the first Finals MVP to play their previous franchise in the Finals.
- Anthony Davis joined Kevin Durant, Michael Jordan, Rick Barry, and Hal Greer as the only players in NBA History to score 30+ points in their first two career NBA Finals games.
- Tyler Herro became the youngest player to start an NBA Finals game at 20 years, 256 days during the Game 2 of the 2020 NBA Finals on October 2, 2020. He was eight days younger than Magic Johnson was when he started Game 1 for the Lakers in 1980.
- Jimmy Butler became the 3rd player in NBA History to record a 40+ point triple-double in the NBA Finals, joining LeBron James in 2015 and Jerry West in 1969. At the end of Game 3 of the NBA Finals, Butler also became the first player (opponent or teammate) to out-score/-rebound/-assist/ LeBron James in a Finals game.
- With their Game 6 win over the Miami Heat, the Los Angeles Lakers won their record-tying 17th NBA championship, tying the Boston Celtics as the two teams to win the most NBA championships (17). In addition to winning their first championship since 2010, the Lakers also became the first team since the 2008 Boston Celtics (who ironically defeated them in the 2008 NBA Finals) to win a championship after missing the playoffs the previous season.
- LeBron James became the first NBA player to win the Finals MVP with three different teams and the third to win a championship with three different teams, joining John Salley and Robert Horry.
- Danny Green joins LeBron as the fourth players to win titles with three different teams.
- Rajon Rondo became the second player after Clyde Lovellette to win a title with the Los Angeles Lakers and Boston Celtics.
- Anthony Davis became the 8th player to achieve the basketball triple crown, winning an Olympic gold medal, NCAA Championship, and NBA Championship, joining Clyde Lovellette, Bill Russell, K.C. Jones, Jerry Lucas, Quinn Buckner, Magic Johnson, and Michael Jordan.

== Format ==
After the NBA suspended its season on March 11, 2020, due to the COVID-19 pandemic, the league started to explore implementing a special postseason format just for this year.

On June 4, the NBA Board of Governors approved a plan to restart the season on July 31 in the NBA Bubble, with 22 of the 30 teams in the league, all clubs mathematically alive for a playoff spot under the 82 game schedule. Under this plan, the 22 teams played eight regular-season "seeding" games. A possible best-of-three play-in series for the final seed in each conference would then be held if the ninth seed finished the regular season within four games of the eighth seed. The eighth seed would start with a de facto 1–0 lead, meaning that it would need just one win to advance, while the ninth seed must win two in a row. The NBA's regular playoff format proceeded as normal. All games were played behind closed doors at the ESPN Wide World of Sports Complex in Walt Disney World.

Under the NBA's regular playoff format, the eight teams with the most wins in each conference qualified for the playoffs. The seedings were based on each team's record. Each conference's bracket was fixed; there was no reseeding. All rounds were best-of-seven series; the series ended when one team won four games, and that team advanced to the next round. All rounds, including the NBA Finals, were in a 2–2–1–1–1 format. In the conference playoffs, home court advantage went to the higher-seeded team (number one being the highest), although since all games were played in the same location, this was merely a designated home court. Seeding was based on each team's regular season record within a conference; if two teams had the same record, standard tiebreaker rules were used. Conference seedings were ignored for the NBA Finals: Home court advantage went to the team with the better regular season record, and, if needed, ties were broken based on head-to-head record, followed by intra-conference record.

== Playoff qualifying ==
On February 23, 2020, the Milwaukee Bucks became the first team to clinch a playoff spot. The Toronto Raptors, Los Angeles Lakers, and Boston Celtics subsequently clinched playoff berths before the season was suspended on March 11.

Seed 8 in each conference is not finalized until the first-stage play-in tournament is completed, unless they finish the regular season with more than four games ahead of seed 9.

| † | Denotes team that clinched a playoff berth prior to the March 11 suspension of the season |
| * | Denotes team that automatically clinched a playoff berth or a division title on the June approval of the 22-team plan to resume the season |

=== Eastern Conference ===
| Seed | Team | Record | Clinched | | | |
| Seed | Team | Record | Playoff berth | Division title | Best record in conference | Best record in NBA |
|---|---|---|---|---|---|---|
| 1 | Milwaukee Bucks | 56–17 | February 23† | June 4* | August 6 | August 8 |
| 2 | Toronto Raptors | 53–19 | March 5† | August 9 | — | — |
| 3 | Boston Celtics | 48–24 | March 10† | — | — | — |
| 4 | Indiana Pacers | 45–28 | June 4* | — | — | — |
| 5 | Miami Heat | 44–29 | June 4* | June 4* | — | — |
| 6 | Philadelphia 76ers | 43–30 | June 4* | — | — | — |
| 7 | Brooklyn Nets | 35–37 | August 7 | — | — | — |
| 8 | Orlando Magic | 33–40 | August 7 | — | — | — |

=== Western Conference ===
| Seed | Team | Record | Clinched | | | | |
| Seed | Team | Record | Play-in | Playoff berth | Division title | Best record in conference | Best record in NBA |
|---|---|---|---|---|---|---|---|
| 1 | Los Angeles Lakers | 52–19 | — | March 6† | August 3 | August 3 | — |
| 2 | Los Angeles Clippers | 49–23 | — | June 4* | — | — | — |
| 3 | Denver Nuggets | 46–27 | — | June 4* | August 10 | — | — |
| 4 | Houston Rockets | 44–28 | — | June 4* | August 9 | — | — |
| 5 | Oklahoma City Thunder | 44–28 | — | June 4* | — | — | — |
| 6 | Utah Jazz | 44–28 | — | June 4* | — | — | — |
| 7 | Dallas Mavericks | 43–32 | — | August 2 | — | — | — |
| 8 | Portland Trail Blazers | 35–39 | August 13 | August 15 | — | — | — |

Memphis (34–39) also secured a play-in berth but did not advance to the playoffs

=== Play-in tournament ===
==== Eastern Conference ====
Because eighth-place Orlando (33–40) finished 7 1/2 games ahead ninth-place Washington (25–47), the Magic automatically advanced to the main rounds of the playoffs as the 8th seed in the Eastern Conference, with no play-in contests being necessary there.

==== Western Conference ====
Because eighth-place Portland (35–39) only finished one-half games ahead of ninth-place Memphis (34–39), a play-in was required to determine the 8th seed in the Western Conference.

ABC

August 15

Recap

Memphis Grizzlies 122, Portland Trail Blazers 126
Portland advances to the playoffs as the 8th seed

HP Field House, Bay Lake, Florida

== Bracket ==
Teams in bold advanced to the next round. The numbers to the left of each team indicate the team's seeding in its conference, and the numbers to the right indicate the number of games the team won in that round. The division champions are marked by an asterisk.

First round | Conference semifinals
**E1** | **Milwaukee*** | **4**
E8 | Orlando | 1
E1 | Milwaukee* | 1
**E5** | **Miami*** | **4**
E4 | Indiana | 0
**E5** | **Miami*** | **4**
**Eastern Conference**
**E3** | **Boston** | **4**
E6 | Philadelphia | 0
**E3** | **Boston** | **4**
E2 | Toronto* | 3
**E2** | **Toronto*** | **4**
E7 | Brooklyn | 0
**W1** | **LA Lakers*** | **4**
W8 | Portland | 1
**W1** | **LA Lakers*** | **4**
W4 | Houston* | 1
**W4** | **Houston*** | **4**
W5 | Oklahoma City | 3
**Western Conference**
**W3** | **Denver*** | **4**
W6 | Utah | 3
**W3** | **Denver*** | **4**
W2 | LA Clippers | 3
**W2** | **LA Clippers** | **4**
W7 | Dallas | 2

Conference finals
**E5** | **Miami*** | **4**
E3 | Boston | 2
**W1** | **LA Lakers*** | **4**
W3 | Denver* | 1

NBA Finals
E5 | Miami* | 2
**W1** | **LA Lakers*** | **4**

- * Division winner
- **Bold** Series winner

== First round ==
Note: All times are EDT (UTC−4) as listed by the NBA. All games were played behind closed doors at the ESPN Wide World of Sports Complex in Walt Disney World.

=== Eastern Conference first round ===
==== (1) Milwaukee Bucks vs. (8) Orlando Magic ====
TNT

August 18
1:30pm

Recap

Orlando Magic 122, Milwaukee Bucks 110
Scoring by quarter: 33–23, 29–29, 30–27, 30–31
| Pts: Nikola Vučević 35; Rebs: Nikola Vučević 14; Asts: D. J. Augustin 11 | Pts: Giannis Antetokounmpo 31; Rebs: Giannis Antetokounmpo 17; Asts: Giannis Antetokounmpo 7 |
Orlando leads series, 1–0

HP Field House, Bay Lake, Florida
Referees: Tony Brothers, Bill Kennedy, Ben Taylor

ESPN

August 20
6:00pm

Recap

Orlando Magic 96, Milwaukee Bucks 111
Scoring by quarter: 13–25, 30–39, 30–29, 23–18
| Pts: Nikola Vučević 32; Rebs: Ennis, Vučević 10 each Asts: D. J. Augustin 5 | Pts: Giannis Antetokounmpo 28; Rebs: Giannis Antetokounmpo 20; Asts: Eric Bledsoe 7 |
Series tied, 1–1

HP Field House, Bay Lake, Florida
Referees: David Guthrie, James Williams, Tre Maddox

TNT

August 22
1:00pm

Recap

Milwaukee Bucks 121, Orlando Magic 107
Scoring by quarter: 31–23, 39–20, 29–34, 22–30
| Pts: Giannis Antetokounmpo 35; Rebs: Giannis Antetokounmpo 11; Asts: Eric Bledsoe 8 | Pts: D. J. Augustin 24; Rebs: Gary Clark 8 Asts: D. J. Augustin 6 |
Milwaukee leads series, 2–1

HP Field House, Bay Lake, Florida
Referees: Marc Davis, Kevin Scott, Michael Smith

NBA TV

August 24
1:30pm

Recap

Milwaukee Bucks 121, Orlando Magic 106
Scoring by quarter: 22–18, 36–34, 26–29, 37–25
| Pts: Giannis Antetokounmpo 31; Rebs: Giannis Antetokounmpo 15; Asts: Giannis Antetokounmpo 8 | Pts: Nikola Vučević 31; Rebs: Nikola Vučević 11; Asts: Fultz, Vučević 7 each |
Milwaukee leads series, 3–1

HP Field House, Bay Lake, Florida
Referees: James Capers, Ed Malloy, Courtney Kirkland

ESPN

August 29 (Note: Rescheduled from August 26)
3:30pm

Recap

Orlando Magic 104, Milwaukee Bucks 118
Scoring by quarter: 21–26, 29–41, 29–23, 25–28
| Pts: Nikola Vučević 22; Rebs: Nikola Vučević 15; Asts: Fultz, Vučević 5 each | Pts: Giannis Antetokounmpo 28; Rebs: Giannis Antetokounmpo 17; Asts: Eric Bledsoe 8 |
Milwaukee wins series, 4–1

AdventHealth Arena, Bay Lake, Florida
Referees: Tony Brothers, Josh Tiven, Tyler Ford

Milwaukee was the first team in the league to refuse to play a game for social justice following the shooting of Jacob Blake.

Regular-season series
Milwaukee won in the regular-season series 4–0

November 1, 2019

Recap

Milwaukee Bucks 123, Orlando Magic 91

Amway Center, Orlando, Florida

December 9, 2019

Recap

Orlando Magic 101, Milwaukee Bucks 110

Fiserv Forum, Milwaukee, Wisconsin

December 28, 2019

Recap

Orlando Magic 100, Milwaukee Bucks 111

Fiserv Forum, Milwaukee, Wisconsin

February 8, 2020

Recap

Milwaukee Bucks 111, Orlando Magic 95

Amway Center, Orlando, Florida

This was the second playoff meeting between the two teams, with the Bucks winning the first meeting.

Previous playoffs series
Milwaukee leads 1–0 in all-time playoff series

2001

Orlando Magic 1, Milwaukee Bucks 3

2001 Eastern Conference first round

==== (2) Toronto Raptors vs. (7) Brooklyn Nets ====
ESPN, SN

August 17
4:00pm

Recap

Brooklyn Nets 110, Toronto Raptors 134
Scoring by quarter: 20–37, 31–36, 35–22, 24–39
| Pts: Timothé Luwawu-Cabarrot 26; Rebs: Jarrett Allen 12; Asts: Caris LeVert 15 | Pts: Fred VanVleet 30; Rebs: Pascal Siakam 11; Asts: Fred VanVleet 11 |
Toronto leads series, 1–0

AdventHealth Arena, Bay Lake, Florida
Referees: John Goble, Tony Brown, Leon Wood

NBA TV, TSN

August 19
1:30pm

Recap

Brooklyn Nets 99, Toronto Raptors 104
Scoring by quarter: 33–29, 20–21, 27–24, 19–30
| Pts: Garrett Temple 21; Rebs: Allen, Harris 15 each Asts: Caris LeVert 11 | Pts: Powell, VanVleet 24 each Rebs: Kyle Lowry 9 Asts: Fred VanVleet 10 |
Toronto leads series, 2–0

HP Field House, Bay Lake, Florida
Referees: Kane Fitzgerald, Sean Corbin, Brian Forte

NBA TV, SN/SN1

August 21
1:30pm

Recap

Toronto Raptors 117, Brooklyn Nets 92
Scoring by quarter: 24–17, 33–25, 27–26, 33–24
| Pts: Pascal Siakam 26; Rebs: Serge Ibaka 13; Asts: Kyle Lowry 7 | Pts: Tyler Johnson 23; Rebs: Jarrett Allen 17; Asts: Caris LeVert 6 |
Toronto leads series, 3–0

HP Field House, Bay Lake, Florida
Referees: Zach Zarba, Pat Fraher, Kevin Cutler

TNT, TSN

August 23
6:30pm

Recap

Toronto Raptors 150, Brooklyn Nets 122
Scoring by quarter: 39–32, 38–36, 39–19, 34–35
| Pts: Norman Powell 29; Rebs: Serge Ibaka 15; Asts: Pascal Siakam 10 | Pts: Caris LeVert 35; Rebs: Jarrett Allen 15; Asts: Chiozza, LeVert 6 each |
Toronto wins series, 4–0

HP Field House, Bay Lake, Florida
Referees: Scott Foster, Rodney Mott, Derrick Collins

Toronto set an NBA playoff record in Game 4 with 100 bench points in a single game.

Regular-season series
Toronto won 3–1 in the regular-season series

December 14, 2019

Recap

Brooklyn Nets 102, Toronto Raptors 110

Scotiabank Arena, Toronto, Ontario

January 4, 2020

Recap

Toronto Raptors 121, Brooklyn Nets 102

Barclays Center, Brooklyn, New York City

February 8, 2020

Recap

Brooklyn Nets 118, Toronto Raptors 119

Scotiabank Arena, Toronto, Ontario

February 12, 2020

Recap

Toronto Raptors 91, Brooklyn Nets 101

Barclays Center, Brooklyn, New York City

This was the third playoff meeting between these two teams, with the Nets winning the two previous meetings.

Previous playoffs series
Brooklyn/New Jersey leads 2–0 in all-time playoff series

2007

New Jersey Nets 4, Toronto Raptors 2

2007 Eastern Conference first round

2014

Brooklyn Nets 4, Toronto Raptors 3

2014 Eastern Conference first round

==== (3) Boston Celtics vs. (6) Philadelphia 76ers ====
ESPN

August 17
6:30pm

Recap

Philadelphia 76ers 101, Boston Celtics 109
Scoring by quarter: 26–25, 23–30, 30–20, 22–34
| Pts: Joel Embiid 26; Rebs: Joel Embiid 16; Asts: Tobias Harris 8 | Pts: Jayson Tatum 32; Rebs: Jayson Tatum 13; Asts: Kemba Walker 5 |
Boston leads series, 1–0

HP Field House, Bay Lake, Florida
Referees: Zach Zarba, Pat Fraher, Sean Corbin

TNT

August 19
6:30pm

Recap

Philadelphia 76ers 101, Boston Celtics 128
Scoring by quarter: 33–27, 24–38, 18–33, 26–30
| Pts: Joel Embiid 34; Rebs: Tobias Harris 11; Asts: Shake Milton 4 | Pts: Jayson Tatum 33; Rebs: Enes Kanter 9 Asts: Jayson Tatum 5 |
Boston leads series, 2–0

HP Field House, Bay Lake, Florida
Referees: John Goble, Tony Brown, Curtis Blair

TNT

August 21
6:30pm

Recap

Boston Celtics 102, Philadelphia 76ers 94
Scoring by quarter: 26–24, 25–25, 25–23, 26–22
| Pts: Kemba Walker 24; Rebs: Smart, Walker 8 each Asts: Kemba Walker 4 | Pts: Joel Embiid 30; Rebs: Tobias Harris 15; Asts: Tobias Harris 4 |
Boston leads series, 3–0

HP Field House, Bay Lake, Florida
Referees: Scott Foster, Sean Wright, Courtney Kirkland

ABC

August 23
1:00pm

Recap

Boston Celtics 110, Philadelphia 76ers 106
Scoring by quarter: 27–32, 30–26, 32–19, 21–29
| Pts: Kemba Walker 32; Rebs: Jayson Tatum 15; Asts: Smart, Tatum, Walker 4 each | Pts: Joel Embiid 30; Rebs: Embiid, Horford 10 each Asts: Josh Richardson 5 |
Boston wins series, 4–0

HP Field House, Bay Lake, Florida
Referees: Kane Fitzgerald, Eric Lewis, Dedric Taylor

Regular-season series
Philadelphia won 3–1 in the regular-season series

October 23, 2019

Recap

Boston Celtics 93, Philadelphia 76ers 107

Wells Fargo Center, Philadelphia, Pennsylvania

December 12, 2019

Recap

Philadelphia 76ers 115, Boston Celtics 109

TD Garden, Boston, Massachusetts

January 9, 2020

Recap

Boston Celtics 98, Philadelphia 76ers 109

Wells Fargo Center, Philadelphia, Pennsylvania

February 1, 2020

Recap

Philadelphia 76ers 95, Boston Celtics 116

TD Garden, Boston, Massachusetts

This was the 22nd playoff meeting between these two teams, with the Celtics winning 13 of the first 21 meetings.

Previous playoffs series
Boston leads 13–8 in all-time playoff series

1953

Boston Celtics 2, Syracuse Nationals 0

1953 Eastern Division Semifinals

1954

Syracuse Nationals 2, Boston Celtics 0

1954 Eastern Division Round Robin Semifinals

1954

Boston Celtics 0, Syracuse Nationals 2

1954 Eastern Division Finals

1955

Boston Celtics 1, Syracuse Nationals 3

1955 Eastern Division Finals

1956

Syracuse Nationals 2, Boston Celtics 2

1956 Eastern Division Semifinals

1957

Syracuse Nationals 0, Boston Celtics 3

1957 Eastern Division Finals

1959

Syracuse Nationals 3, Boston Celtics 4

1959 Eastern Division Finals

1961

Syracuse Nationals 1, Boston Celtics 4

1961 Eastern Division Finals

1965

Philadelphia 76ers 3, Boston Celtics 4

1965 Eastern Division Finals

1966

Boston Celtics 4, Philadelphia 76ers 1

1966 Eastern Division Finals

1967

Boston Celtics 1, Philadelphia 76ers 4

1967 Eastern Division Finals

1968

Boston Celtics 4, Philadelphia 76ers 3

1968 Eastern Division Finals

1969

Boston Celtics 4, Philadelphia 76ers 1

1969 Eastern Division Semifinals

1977

Boston Celtics 3, Philadelphia 76ers 4

1977 Eastern Conference semifinals

1980

Philadelphia 76ers 4, Boston Celtics 1

1980 Eastern Conference finals

1981

Philadelphia 76ers 3, Boston Celtics 4

1981 Eastern Conference finals

1982

Philadelphia 76ers 4, Boston Celtics 3

1982 Eastern Conference finals

1985

Philadelphia 76ers 1, Boston Celtics 4

1985 Eastern Conference finals

2002

Philadelphia 76ers 2, Boston Celtics 3

2002 Eastern Conference first round

2012

Philadelphia 76ers 3, Boston Celtics 4

2012 Eastern Conference semifinals

2018

Philadelphia 76ers 1, Boston Celtics 4

2018 Eastern Conference semifinals

==== (4) Indiana Pacers vs. (5) Miami Heat ====
TNT

August 18
4:00pm

Recap

Miami Heat 113, Indiana Pacers 101
Scoring by quarter: 27–33, 29–19, 25–28, 32–21
| Pts: Jimmy Butler 28; Rebs: Bam Adebayo 10; Asts: Bam Adebayo 6 | Pts: T. J. Warren 22; Rebs: Myles Turner 9 Asts: Malcolm Brogdon 10 |
Miami leads series, 1–0

AdventHealth Arena, Bay Lake, Florida
Referees: David Guthrie, Ed Malloy, Tyler Ford

ESPN

August 20
1:00pm

Recap

Miami Heat 109, Indiana Pacers 100
Scoring by quarter: 22–24, 29–22, 37–31, 21–23
| Pts: Duncan Robinson 24; Rebs: Jae Crowder 8 Asts: Dragić, Butler 6 each | Pts: Victor Oladipo 22; Rebs: Myles Turner 8 Asts: Malcolm Brogdon 9 |
Miami leads series, 2–0

HP Field House, Bay Lake, Florida
Referees: James Capers, Josh Tiven, Derrick Collins

TNT

August 22
3:30pm

Recap

Indiana Pacers 115, Miami Heat 124
Scoring by quarter: 27–34, 29–40, 34–20, 25–30
| Pts: Malcolm Brogdon 34; Rebs: Myles Turner 12; Asts: Malcolm Brogdon 14 | Pts: Jimmy Butler 27; Rebs: Bam Adebayo 11; Asts: Goran Dragić 6 |
Miami leads series, 3–0

AdventHealth Arena, Bay Lake, Florida
Referees: Tony Brothers, Tre Maddox, Ben Taylor

TNT

August 24
6:30pm

Recap

Indiana Pacers 87, Miami Heat 99
Scoring by quarter: 22–21, 20–27, 20–22, 25–29
| Pts: Victor Oladipo 25; Rebs: Myles Turner 14; Asts: Malcolm Brogdon 7 | Pts: Goran Dragić 23; Rebs: Bam Adebayo 19; Asts: Bam Adebayo 6 |
Miami wins series, 4–0

HP Field House, Bay Lake, Florida
Referees: Marc Davis, Kevin Scott, Gediminas Petraitis

Regular-season series
Miami won 3–1 in the regular-season series

December 27, 2019

Recap

Indiana Pacers 112, Miami Heat 113

American Airlines Arena, Miami, Florida

January 8, 2020

Recap

Miami Heat 122, Indiana Pacers 108

Bankers Life Fieldhouse, Indianapolis, Indiana

August 10, 2020

Recap

Indiana Pacers 92, Miami Heat 114

Visa Athletic Center, Bay Lake, Florida

August 14, 2020

Recap

Miami Heat 92, Indiana Pacers 109

AdventHealth Arena, Bay Lake, Florida

This was the fifth playoff meeting between these two teams, with the Heat winning three of the first four meetings.

Previous playoffs series
Miami leads 3–1 in all-time playoff series

2004

Miami Heat 2, Indiana Pacers 4

2004 Eastern Conference semifinals

2012

Indiana Pacers 2, Miami Heat 4

2012 Eastern Conference semifinals

2013

Indiana Pacers 3, Miami Heat 4

2013 Eastern Conference finals

2014

Miami Heat 4, Indiana Pacers 2

2014 Eastern Conference finals

=== Western Conference first round ===
==== (1) Los Angeles Lakers vs. (8) Portland Trail Blazers ====
TNT

August 18
9:00pm

Recap

Portland Trail Blazers 100, Los Angeles Lakers 93
Scoring by quarter: 36–25, 21–31, 21–19, 22–18
| Pts: Damian Lillard 34; Rebs: Jusuf Nurkić 15; Asts: Anthony, Lillard 5 each | Pts: Anthony Davis 28; Rebs: LeBron James 17; Asts: LeBron James 16 |
Portland leads series, 1–0

AdventHealth Arena, Bay Lake, Florida
Referees: Marc Davis, Tre Maddox, James Williams

Despite a losing effort, LeBron James had the first 20-point, 15 rebound, 15 assist performance in NBA playoff history.

ESPN

August 20
9:00pm

Recap

Portland Trail Blazers 88, Los Angeles Lakers 111
Scoring by quarter: 19–27, 20–29, 19–32, 30–23
| Pts: Damian Lillard 18; Rebs: Hassan Whiteside 9 Asts: CJ McCollum 3 | Pts: Anthony Davis 31; Rebs: Anthony Davis 11; Asts: LeBron James 7 |
Series tied, 1–1

AdventHealth Arena, Bay Lake, Florida
Referees: Tony Brothers, Bill Kennedy, Dedric Taylor

ABC

August 22
8:30pm

Recap

Los Angeles Lakers 116, Portland Trail Blazers 108
Scoring by quarter: 25–29, 28–28, 40–29, 23–22
| Pts: LeBron James 38; Rebs: LeBron James 12; Asts: Davis, James 8 each | Pts: Damian Lillard 34; Rebs: McCollum, Whiteside 8 each Asts: Damian Lillard 7 |
LA Lakers lead series, 2–1

AdventHealth Arena, Bay Lake, Florida
Referees: James Capers, Josh Tiven, Mark Ayotte

TNT

August 24
9:00pm

Recap

Los Angeles Lakers 135, Portland Trail Blazers 115
Scoring by quarter: 43–25, 37–26, 32–36, 23–28
| Pts: LeBron James 30; Rebs: McGee, Howard 8 each Asts: LeBron James 10 | Pts: Jusuf Nurkić 20; Rebs: Jusuf Nurkić 13; Asts: Anfernee Simons 6 |
LA Lakers lead series, 3–1

AdventHealth Arena, Bay Lake, Florida
Referees: David Guthrie, Rodney Mott, Ben Taylor

TNT

August 29
9:00pm

Recap

Portland Trail Blazers 122, Los Angeles Lakers 131
Scoring by quarter: 31–35, 37–33, 24–32, 30–31
| Pts: CJ McCollum 36; Rebs: Jusuf Nurkić 10; Asts: CJ McCollum 7 | Pts: Anthony Davis 43; Rebs: LeBron James 10; Asts: LeBron James 10 |
LA Lakers win series, 4–1

AdventHealth Arena, Bay Lake, Florida
Referees: Marc Davis, Kevin Scott, Curtis Blair

This was the Lakers first playoff series win since 2012.

Game 5 was postponed by the league after the Lakers and Trail Blazers refused to play.

Regular-season series
LA Lakers won 2–1 in the regular-season series

December 6, 2019

Recap

Los Angeles Lakers 136, Portland Trail Blazers 113

Moda Center, Portland, Oregon

December 28, 2019

Recap

Los Angeles Lakers 128, Portland Trail Blazers 120

Moda Center, Portland, Oregon

January 31, 2020

Recap

Portland Trail Blazers 127, Los Angeles Lakers 119

Staples Center, Los Angeles, California

This was the 12th playoff meeting between these two teams, with the Lakers winning nine of the first eleven meetings.

Previous playoffs series
Los Angeles leads 9–2 in all-time playoff series

1977

Portland Trail Blazers 4, Los Angeles Lakers 0

1977 Western Conference finals

1983

Portland Trail Blazers 1, Los Angeles Lakers 4

1983 Western Conference semifinals

1985

Portland Trail Blazers 1, Los Angeles Lakers 4

1985 Western Conference semifinals

1989

Portland Trail Blazers 0, Los Angeles Lakers 3

1989 Western Conference first round

1991

Los Angeles Lakers 4, Portland Trail Blazers 2

1991 Western Conference finals

1992

Los Angeles Lakers 1, Portland Trail Blazers 3

1992 Western Conference first round

1997

Portland Trail Blazers 1, Los Angeles Lakers 3

1997 Western Conference first round

1998

Portland Trail Blazers 1, Los Angeles Lakers 3

1998 Western Conference first round

2000

Portland Trail Blazers 3, Los Angeles Lakers 4

2000 Western Conference finals

2001

Portland Trail Blazers 0, Los Angeles Lakers 3

2001 Western Conference first round

2002

Portland Trail Blazers 0, Los Angeles Lakers 3

2002 Western Conference first round

==== (2) Los Angeles Clippers vs. (7) Dallas Mavericks ====
ESPN

August 17
9:00pm

Recap

Dallas Mavericks 110, Los Angeles Clippers 118
Scoring by quarter: 38–34, 31–32, 13–21, 28–31
| Pts: Luka Dončić 42; Rebs: Boban Marjanović 8 Asts: Luka Dončić 9 | Pts: Kawhi Leonard 29; Rebs: Kawhi Leonard 12; Asts: Kawhi Leonard 6 |
LA Clippers lead series, 1–0

AdventHealth Arena, Bay Lake, Florida
Referees: Kane Fitzgerald, Eric Lewis, Mark Ayotte

Dončić's 42 points are the most points in a playoff debut. Following the game, many people, including LeBron James and current Kansas City Chiefs quarterback Patrick Mahomes, criticized the officials for controversially ejecting Porziņģis during the 3rd quarter after he received two technical fouls that the critics considered "bogus".

ESPN

August 19
9:00pm

Recap

Dallas Mavericks 127, Los Angeles Clippers 114
Scoring by quarter: 29–25, 32–31, 37–29, 29–29
| Pts: Luka Dončić 28; Rebs: Maxi Kleber 10; Asts: Luka Dončić 7 | Pts: Kawhi Leonard 35; Rebs: George, Leonard 10 each Asts: Lou Williams 7 |
Series tied, 1–1

AdventHealth Arena, Bay Lake, Florida
Referees: Scott Foster, Sean Wright, Courtney Kirkland

TNT

August 21
9:00pm

Recap

Los Angeles Clippers 130, Dallas Mavericks 122
Scoring by quarter: 23–23, 45–31, 34–31, 28–37
| Pts: Kawhi Leonard 36; Rebs: George, Leonard 9 each Asts: Kawhi Leonard 8 | Pts: Kristaps Porziņģis 34; Rebs: Kristaps Porziņģis 13; Asts: Luka Dončić 10 |
LA Clippers lead series, 2–1

AdventHealth Arena, Bay Lake, Florida
Referees: John Goble, Tony Brown, Curtis Blair

ABC

August 23
3:30pm

Recap

Los Angeles Clippers 133, Dallas Mavericks 135 (OT)
Scoring by quarter: 34–24, 32–34, 19–35, 36–28, Overtime: 12–14
| Pts: Lou Williams 36; Rebs: Kawhi Leonard 9 Asts: Lou Williams 5 | Pts: Luka Dončić 43; Rebs: Luka Dončić 17; Asts: Luka Dončić 13 |
Series tied, 2–2

AdventHealth Arena, Bay Lake, Florida
Referees: Zach Zarba, James Williams, Kevin Cutler

Down by 1, Luka Dončić hit the game-winning 3 point buzzer-beater at the end of overtime. He becomes the youngest player to hit a buzzer-beater in the playoffs. His winning shot capped an incredible triple-double performance with 43 points, 17 rebounds, and 13 assists.

TNT

August 25
9:00pm

Recap

Dallas Mavericks 111, Los Angeles Clippers 154
Scoring by quarter: 22–41, 30–35, 34–35, 25–43
| Pts: Luka Dončić 22; Rebs: Luka Dončić 8 Asts: Dončić, Finney-Smith 4 each | Pts: Paul George 35; Rebs: Montrezl Harrell 11; Asts: Reggie Jackson 5 |
LA Clippers lead series, 3–2

AdventHealth Arena, Bay Lake, Florida
Referees: Kane Fitzgerald, Pat Fraher, Tre Maddox

The Clippers set 5 franchise records in this game, including: most points scored in a playoff game, as well as most 3-pointers made in a playoff game, as they shot 22-of-35 from long range.

ESPN

August 30 (Note: Rescheduled from August 27)
3:30pm

Recap

Los Angeles Clippers 111, Dallas Mavericks 97
Scoring by quarter: 29–34, 28–17, 28–23, 26–23
| Pts: Kawhi Leonard 33; Rebs: Kawhi Leonard 14; Asts: George, Leonard 7 each | Pts: Luka Dončić 38; Rebs: Burke, Dončić 9 each Asts: Luka Dončić 9 |
LA Clippers win series, 4–2

AdventHealth Arena, Bay Lake, Florida
Referees: Scott Foster, Bill Kennedy, Sean Corbin

Kawhi Leonard became the first player since 2000 to have 30+ points, 10+ rebounds, 5+ assists and 5+ steals in a playoff game.

Regular-season series
LA Clippers won 3–0 in the regular-season series

November 26, 2019

Recap

Los Angeles Clippers 114, Dallas Mavericks 99

American Airlines Center, Dallas, Texas

January 21, 2020

Recap

Los Angeles Clippers 110, Dallas Mavericks 107

American Airlines Center, Dallas, Texas

August 6, 2020

Recap

Los Angeles Clippers 126, Dallas Mavericks 111

HP Field House, Bay Lake, Florida

This was the first playoff meeting between the Clippers and the Mavericks.

- This marked the Clippers first playoffs series win since 2015. In addition, it was their first series win since 2006 without Chris Paul, Blake Griffin, and DeAndre Jordan.

==== (3) Denver Nuggets vs. (6) Utah Jazz ====
ESPN

August 17
1:30pm

Recap

Utah Jazz 125, Denver Nuggets 135 (OT)
Scoring by quarter: 25–31, 27–28, 31–19, 32–37, Overtime: 10–20
| Pts: Donovan Mitchell 57; Rebs: Bradley, Mitchell 9 each Asts: Donovan Mitchell 7 | Pts: Jamal Murray 36; Rebs: Nikola Jokić 10; Asts: Jamal Murray 9 |
Denver leads series, 1–0

HP Field House, Bay Lake, Florida
Referees: Scott Foster, Sean Wright, Curtis Blair

Mitchell's 57 points became the third most points scored in a single playoff game.

TNT

August 19
4:00pm

Recap

Utah Jazz 124, Denver Nuggets 105
Scoring by quarter: 27–25, 34–23, 43–29, 20–28
| Pts: Donovan Mitchell 30; Rebs: Bradley, Gobert, O'Neale 7 each Asts: Mitchell, O'Neale 8 each | Pts: Jokić, Porter Jr. 28 each Rebs: Nikola Jokić 11; Asts: Nikola Jokić 6 |
Series tied, 1–1

AdventHealth Arena, Bay Lake, Florida
Referees: Zach Zarba, Pat Fraher, Michael Smith

TNT

August 21
4:00pm

Recap

Denver Nuggets 87, Utah Jazz 124
Scoring by quarter: 14–25, 28–34, 20–35, 25–30
| Pts: Nikola Jokić 15; Rebs: Plumlee, Dozier 6 each Asts: Jokić, Murray 6 each | Pts: Mike Conley 27; Rebs: Rudy Gobert 14; Asts: Joe Ingles 8 |
Utah leads series, 2–1

AdventHealth Arena, Bay Lake, Florida
Referees: Kane Fitzgerald, Eric Lewis, Tyler Ford

TNT

August 23
9:00pm

Recap

Denver Nuggets 127, Utah Jazz 129
Scoring by quarter: 36–33, 29–31, 24–33, 38–32
| Pts: Jamal Murray 50; Rebs: Jamal Murray 11; Asts: Jamal Murray 7 | Pts: Donovan Mitchell 51; Rebs: Rudy Gobert 11; Asts: Donovan Mitchell 7 |
Utah leads series, 3–1

AdventHealth Arena, Bay Lake, Florida
Referees: John Goble, Sean Corbin, Brian Forte

This was the first playoff game in NBA history in which two players scored 50 points.

TNT

August 25
6:30pm

Recap

Utah Jazz 107, Denver Nuggets 117
Scoring by quarter: 32–33, 31–21, 23–28, 21–35
| Pts: Donovan Mitchell 30; Rebs: Rudy Gobert 12; Asts: Conley, Mitchell 5 each | Pts: Jamal Murray 42; Rebs: Jamal Murray 8 Asts: Jamal Murray 8 |
Utah leads series, 3–2

HP Field House, Bay Lake, Florida
Referees: Scott Foster, Tony Brown, James Williams

TNT

August 30
8:30pm

Recap

Denver Nuggets 119, Utah Jazz 107
Scoring by quarter: 30–36, 31–20, 27–23, 31–28
| Pts: Jamal Murray 50; Rebs: Michael Porter Jr. 12; Asts: Nikola Jokić 9 | Pts: Donovan Mitchell 44; Rebs: Rudy Gobert 11; Asts: Mike Conley 6 |
Series tied, 3–3

AdventHealth Arena, Bay Lake, Florida
Referees: Zach Zarba, Sean Wright, Courtney Kirkland

ABC

September 1
8:30pm

Recap

Utah Jazz 78, Denver Nuggets 80
Scoring by quarter: 21–26, 15–24, 24–15, 18–15
| Pts: Donovan Mitchell 22; Rebs: Rudy Gobert 18; Asts: Mike Conley 7 | Pts: Nikola Jokić 30; Rebs: Nikola Jokić 14; Asts: Monté Morris 5 |
Denver wins series, 4–3

AdventHealth Arena, Bay Lake, Florida
Referees: James Capers, David Guthrie, Bill Kennedy

Denver became the 12th team in NBA history to come back from a 3–1 deficit. Nikola Jokić scored the go-ahead hook shot with 27.8 seconds remaining in regulation. Mike Conley Jr.'s potential series-winning three-pointer at the buzzer rimmed out.

Regular-season series
Denver won 3–0 in the regular-season series

January 30, 2020

Recap

Utah Jazz 100, Denver Nuggets 106

Pepsi Center, Denver, Colorado

February 5, 2020

Recap

Denver Nuggets 98, Utah Jazz 95

Vivint Smart Home Arena, Salt Lake City, Utah

August 8, 2020

Recap

Utah Jazz 132, Denver Nuggets 134 (2OT)

AdventHealth Arena, Bay Lake, Florida

This was the fifth playoff meeting between these two teams, with the Jazz winning three of the first four meetings.

Previous playoffs series
Utah leads 3–1 in all-time playoff series

1984

Denver Nuggets 2, Utah Jazz 3

1984 Western Conference first round

1985

Utah Jazz 1, Denver Nuggets 4

1985 Western Conference semifinals

1994

Denver Nuggets 3, Utah Jazz 4

1994 Western Conference semifinals

2010

Utah Jazz 4, Denver Nuggets 2

2010 Western Conference first round

==== (4) Houston Rockets vs. (5) Oklahoma City Thunder ====
TNT

August 18
6:30pm

Recap

Oklahoma City Thunder 108, Houston Rockets 123
Scoring by quarter: 20–28, 32–40, 31–36, 25–19
| Pts: Danilo Gallinari 29; Rebs: Steven Adams 12; Asts: Chris Paul 9 | Pts: James Harden 37; Rebs: James Harden 11; Asts: Danuel House 5 |
Houston leads series, 1–0

HP Field House, Bay Lake, Florida
Referees: James Capers, Josh Tiven, Derrick Collins

ESPN

August 20
3:30pm

Recap

Oklahoma City Thunder 98, Houston Rockets 111
Scoring by quarter: 30–35, 29–18, 19–24, 20–34
| Pts: Shai Gilgeous-Alexander 31; Rebs: Steven Adams 11; Asts: Dennis Schröder 5 | Pts: James Harden 21; Rebs: Danuel House 9 Asts: James Harden 9 |
Houston leads series, 2–0

AdventHealth Arena, Bay Lake, Florida
Referees: Marc Davis, Kevin Scott, Gediminas Petraitis

ESPN

August 22
6:00pm

Recap

Houston Rockets 107, Oklahoma City Thunder 119 (OT)
Scoring by quarter: 29–23, 34–34, 19–21, 22–26, Overtime: 3–15
| Pts: James Harden 38; Rebs: Danuel House 10; Asts: James Harden 8 | Pts: Dennis Schröder 29; Rebs: Steven Adams 13; Asts: Shai Gilgeous-Alexander 6 |
Houston leads series, 2–1

HP Field House, Bay Lake, Florida
Referees: David Guthrie, Ed Malloy, Leon Wood

TNT

August 24
4:00pm

Recap

Houston Rockets 114, Oklahoma City Thunder 117
Scoring by quarter: 37–35, 23–25, 33–32, 21–25
| Pts: James Harden 32; Rebs: P. J. Tucker 11; Asts: James Harden 15 | Pts: Dennis Schröder 30; Rebs: Shai Gilgeous-Alexander 12; Asts: Shai Gilgeous-Alexander 6 |
Series tied, 2–2

AdventHealth Arena, Bay Lake, Florida
Referees: Tony Brothers, Bill Kennedy, Tyler Ford

TNT

August 29
6:30pm

Recap

Oklahoma City Thunder 80, Houston Rockets 114
Scoring by quarter: 14–24, 31–24, 18–37, 17–29
| Pts: Dennis Schröder 19; Rebs: Steven Adams 14; Asts: Shai Gilgeous-Alexander 4 | Pts: James Harden 31; Rebs: Jeff Green 10; Asts: Russell Westbrook 7 |
Houston leads series, 3–2

HP Field House, Bay Lake, Florida
Referees: James Capers, Eric Lewis, Rodney Mott

Game 5 was postponed by the league following a boycott by the Rockets and Thunder.

TNT

August 31
9:00pm

Recap

Houston Rockets 100, Oklahoma City Thunder 104
Scoring by quarter: 25–24, 26–24, 24–29, 25–27
| Pts: James Harden 32; Rebs: P. J. Tucker 11; Asts: James Harden 7 | Pts: Chris Paul 28; Rebs: Steven Adams 14; Asts: Shai Gilgeous-Alexander 6 |
Series tied, 3–3

AdventHealth Arena, Bay Lake, Florida
Referees: Marc Davis, Josh Tiven, Kevin Scott

ESPN

September 2
9:00pm

Recap

Oklahoma City Thunder 102, Houston Rockets 104
Scoring by quarter: 30–29, 29–32, 21–24, 22–19
| Pts: Luguentz Dort 30; Rebs: Chris Paul 11; Asts: Chris Paul 12 | Pts: Covington, Gordon 21 each Rebs: Robert Covington 10; Asts: James Harden 9 |
Houston wins series, 4–3

AdventHealth Arena, Bay Lake, Florida
Referees: Scott Foster, Pat Fraher, Tony Brown

Regular-season series
Oklahoma City won 2–1 in the regular-season series

October 28, 2019

Recap

Oklahoma City Thunder 112, Houston Rockets 116

Toyota Center, Houston, Texas

January 9, 2020

Recap

Houston Rockets 92, Oklahoma City Thunder 113

Chesapeake Energy Arena, Oklahoma City, Oklahoma

January 20, 2020

Recap

Oklahoma City Thunder 112, Houston Rockets 107

Toyota Center, Houston, Texas

This was the ninth playoff meeting between these two teams, with the Thunder/SuperSonics winning six of the first eight meetings.

Previous playoffs series
Oklahoma City/Seattle leads 6–2 in all-time playoff series

1982

Houston Rockets 1, Seattle SuperSonics 2

1982 Western Conference first round

1987

Seattle SuperSonics 4, Houston Rockets 2

1987 Western Conference semifinals

1989

Houston Rockets 1, Seattle SuperSonics 3

1989 Western Conference first round

1993

Houston Rockets 3, Seattle SuperSonics 4

1993 Western Conference semifinals

1996

Houston Rockets 0, Seattle SuperSonics 4

1996 Western Conference semifinals

1997

Seattle SuperSonics 3, Houston Rockets 4

1997 Western Conference semifinals

2013

Houston Rockets 2, Oklahoma City Thunder 4

2013 Western Conference first round

2017

Oklahoma City Thunder 1, Houston Rockets 4

2017 Western Conference first round

- Game 7 marked the Thunder's final playoff game until 2024.

== Conference semifinals ==
Note: All times are EDT (UTC−4) as listed by the NBA. All games were played behind closed doors at the ESPN Wide World of Sports Complex in Walt Disney World.

=== Eastern Conference semifinals ===
==== (1) Milwaukee Bucks vs. (5) Miami Heat ====
TNT

August 31
6:30pm

Recap

Miami Heat 115, Milwaukee Bucks 104
Scoring by quarter: 29–40, 31–23, 32–23, 23–18
| Pts: Jimmy Butler 40; Rebs: Bam Adebayo 17; Asts: Bam Adebayo 6 | Pts: Khris Middleton 28; Rebs: Giannis Antetokounmpo 10; Asts: Giannis Antetokounmpo 9 |
Miami leads series, 1–0

HP Field House, Bay Lake, Florida
Referees: Kane Fitzgerald, Eric Lewis, Rodney Mott

ESPN

September 2
6:30pm

Recap

Miami Heat 116, Milwaukee Bucks 114
Scoring by quarter: 38–29, 28–31, 24–26, 26–28
| Pts: Goran Dragić 23; Rebs: Bam Adebayo 9 Asts: Jimmy Butler 6 | Pts: Giannis Antetokounmpo 29; Rebs: Giannis Antetokounmpo 14; Asts: Khris Middleton 8 |
Miami leads series, 2–0

HP Field House, Bay Lake, Florida
Referees: Marc Davis, Sean Wright, Kevin Scott

After being fouled by Giannis Antetokounmpo on a game-winning shot attempt as time expired in regulation, Jimmy Butler won the game for Miami with a pair of walk-off free throws. This marked the first time a playoff game had ended in such a fashion since Game 1 of the 1979 NBA Finals.

TNT

September 4
6:30pm

Recap

Milwaukee Bucks 100, Miami Heat 115
Scoring by quarter: 30–29, 27–21, 30–25, 13–40
| Pts: Brook Lopez 22; Rebs: Giannis Antetokounmpo 16; Asts: Giannis Antetokounmpo 9 | Pts: Jimmy Butler 30; Rebs: Bam Adebayo 16; Asts: Jimmy Butler 6 |
Miami leads series, 3–0

HP Field House, Bay Lake, Florida
Referees: Scott Foster, David Guthrie, Sean Corbin

ABC

September 6
3:30pm

Recap

Milwaukee Bucks 118, Miami Heat 115 (OT)
Scoring by quarter: 22–31, 28–17, 35–40, 22–19, Overtime: 11–8
| Pts: Khris Middleton 36; Rebs: Eric Bledsoe 10; Asts: Khris Middleton 8 | Pts: Bam Adebayo 26; Rebs: Bam Adebayo 12; Asts: Adebayo, Dragić 8 each |
Miami leads series, 3–1

AdventHealth Arena, Bay Lake, Florida
Referees: Zach Zarba, Tony Brothers, Tyler Ford

TNT

September 8
6:30pm

Recap

Miami Heat 103, Milwaukee Bucks 94
Scoring by quarter: 19–28, 33–18, 21–19, 30–29
| Pts: Butler, Dragić 17 each Rebs: Jimmy Butler 10; Asts: Butler, Herro 6 each | Pts: Khris Middleton 23; Rebs: Brook Lopez 14; Asts: Eric Bledsoe 9 |
Miami wins series, 4–1

HP Field House, Bay Lake, Florida
Referees: James Capers, Josh Tiven, Rodney Mott

Regular-season series
Miami won 2–1 in the regular-season series

October 26, 2019

Recap

Miami Heat 131, Milwaukee Bucks 126 (OT)

Fiserv Forum, Milwaukee, Wisconsin

March 2, 2020

Recap

Milwaukee Bucks 89, Miami Heat 105

American Airlines Arena, Miami, Florida

August 6, 2020

Recap

Miami Heat 116, Milwaukee Bucks 130

AdventHealth Arena, Bay Lake, Florida

This was the second playoff meeting between these two teams, with the Heat winning the previous meeting.

Previous playoffs series
Miami leads 1–0 in all-time playoff series

2013

Milwaukee Bucks 0, Miami Heat 4

2013 Eastern Conference first round

==== (2) Toronto Raptors vs. (3) Boston Celtics ====
ESPN, TSN

August 30
1:00pm

Recap

Boston Celtics 112, Toronto Raptors 94
Scoring by quarter: 39–23, 20–19, 29–31, 24–21
| Pts: Smart, Tatum 21 each Rebs: Daniel Theis 15; Asts: Kemba Walker 10 | Pts: Kyle Lowry 17; Rebs: Serge Ibaka 9 Asts: Lowry, VanVleet 8 each |
Boston leads series, 1–0

HP Field House, Bay Lake, Florida
Referees: John Goble, Ed Malloy, James Williams

Both teams discussed a boycott of Game 1, similar to the Milwaukee Bucks, in protest due to the shooting of Jacob Blake. The game was eventually postponed.

ESPN, SN

September 1
5:30pm

Recap

Boston Celtics 102, Toronto Raptors 99
Scoring by quarter: 28–28, 22–20, 20–30, 32–21
| Pts: Jayson Tatum 34; Rebs: Daniel Theis 9 Asts: Jayson Tatum 6 | Pts: OG Anunoby 20; Rebs: Serge Ibaka 9 Asts: Lowry, VanVleet 7 each |
Boston leads series, 2–0

HP Field House, Bay Lake, Florida
Referees: Zach Zarba, Tony Brothers, Sean Corbin

TNT, TSN

September 3
6:30pm

Recap

Toronto Raptors 104, Boston Celtics 103
Scoring by quarter: 28–33, 19–24, 29–23, 28–23
| Pts: Kyle Lowry 31; Rebs: OG Anunoby 10; Asts: Kyle Lowry 8 | Pts: Kemba Walker 29; Rebs: Jaylen Brown 12; Asts: Jayson Tatum 6 |
Boston leads series, 2–1

HP Field House, Bay Lake, Florida
Referees: James Capers, Josh Tiven, Rodney Mott

With 0.5 seconds on the clock and Toronto trailing by 2, Kyle Lowry threw a cross-court inbounds pass to OG Anunoby, who made a 3-point shot as the buzzer sounded to win the game for Toronto.

TNT, SN

September 5
6:30pm

Recap

Toronto Raptors 100, Boston Celtics 93
Scoring by quarter: 31–27, 18–22, 32–24, 19–20
| Pts: Pascal Siakam 23; Rebs: Lowry, Siakam 11 each Asts: Kyle Lowry 7 | Pts: Jayson Tatum 24; Rebs: Jayson Tatum 10; Asts: Kemba Walker 8 |
Series tied, 2–2

HP Field House, Bay Lake, Florida
Referees: Marc Davis, Bill Kennedy, Kevin Scott

TNT, TSN

September 7
6:30pm

Recap

Boston Celtics 111, Toronto Raptors 89
Scoring by quarter: 25–11, 37–24, 25–28, 24–26
| Pts: Jaylen Brown 27; Rebs: Jayson Tatum 10; Asts: Kemba Walker 7 | Pts: Fred VanVleet 18; Rebs: OG Anunoby 7 Asts: Lowry, VanVleet 5 each |
Boston leads series, 3–2

HP Field House, Bay Lake, Florida
Referees: Kane Fitzgerald, Eric Lewis, Courtney Kirkland

ESPN, SN

September 9
6:30pm

Recap

Toronto Raptors 125, Boston Celtics 122 (2OT)
Scoring by quarter: 21–25, 27–27, 33–25, 17–21, Overtime: 8–8, 19–16
| Pts: Kyle Lowry 33; Rebs: OG Anunoby 13; Asts: Fred VanVleet 7 | Pts: Jaylen Brown 31; Rebs: Jaylen Brown 16; Asts: Marcus Smart 10 |
Series tied, 3–3

HP Field House, Bay Lake, Florida
Referees: John Goble, Tony Brothers, Sean Wright

TNT, TSN

September 11
9:00pm

Recap

Boston Celtics 92, Toronto Raptors 87
Scoring by quarter: 26–27, 24–19, 22–25, 20–16
| Pts: Jayson Tatum 29; Rebs: Jayson Tatum 12; Asts: Jayson Tatum 7 | Pts: Fred VanVleet 20; Rebs: Pascal Siakam 11; Asts: Fred VanVleet 6 |
Boston wins series, 4–3

AdventHealth Arena, Bay Lake, Florida
Referees: Scott Foster, Zach Zarba, David Guthrie

Regular-season series
Boston won 3–1 in the regular-season series

October 25, 2019

Recap

Toronto Raptors 106, Boston Celtics 112

TD Garden, Boston, Massachusetts

December 25, 2019

Recap

Boston Celtics 118, Toronto Raptors 102

Scotiabank Arena, Toronto, Ontario

December 28, 2019

Recap

Toronto Raptors 113, Boston Celtics 97

TD Garden, Boston, Massachusetts

August 7, 2020

Recap

Boston Celtics 122, Toronto Raptors 100

AdventHealth Arena, Bay Lake, Florida

This was the first playoff meeting between the Raptors and the Celtics.

=== Western Conference semifinals ===
==== (1) Los Angeles Lakers vs. (4) Houston Rockets ====
ESPN

September 4
9:00pm

Recap

Houston Rockets 112, Los Angeles Lakers 97
Scoring by quarter: 29–28, 34–27, 22–24, 27–18
| Pts: James Harden 36; Rebs: Tucker, Westbrook 9 each Asts: Russell Westbrook 6 | Pts: Anthony Davis 25; Rebs: Anthony Davis 14; Asts: LeBron James 7 |
Houston leads series, 1–0

AdventHealth Arena, Bay Lake, Florida
Referees: Kane Fitzgerald, Sean Wright, Ben Taylor

ABC

September 6
8:30pm

Recap

Houston Rockets 109, Los Angeles Lakers 117
Scoring by quarter: 20–36, 31–31, 41–23, 17–27
| Pts: James Harden 27; Rebs: Russell Westbrook 13; Asts: James Harden 7 | Pts: Anthony Davis 34; Rebs: LeBron James 11; Asts: James, Rondo 9 each |
Series tied, 1–1

AdventHealth Arena, Bay Lake, Florida
Referees: Scott Foster, Josh Tiven, Curtis Blair

TNT

September 8
9:00pm

Recap

Los Angeles Lakers 112, Houston Rockets 102
Scoring by quarter: 32–33, 29–31, 21–18, 30–20
| Pts: LeBron James 36; Rebs: Anthony Davis 15; Asts: Rajon Rondo 9 | Pts: James Harden 33; Rebs: James Harden 9 Asts: James Harden 9 |
LA Lakers lead series, 2–1

AdventHealth Arena, Bay Lake, Florida
Referees: Marc Davis, Pat Fraher, Tre Maddox

TNT

September 10
7:00pm

Recap

Los Angeles Lakers 110, Houston Rockets 100
Scoring by quarter: 26–22, 31–19, 29–29, 24–30
| Pts: Anthony Davis 29; Rebs: LeBron James 15; Asts: LeBron James 9 | Pts: Russell Westbrook 26; Rebs: Jeff Green 7 Asts: James Harden 10 |
LA Lakers lead series, 3–1

AdventHealth Arena, Bay Lake, Florida
Referees: James Capers, Tony Brown, Courtney Kirkland

ESPN

September 12
8:00pm

Recap

Houston Rockets 96, Los Angeles Lakers 119
Scoring by quarter: 20–35, 31–27, 18–33, 27–24
| Pts: James Harden 30; Rebs: James Harden 6 Asts: Russell Westbrook 6 | Pts: LeBron James 29; Rebs: Davis, James 11 each Asts: LeBron James 7 |
LA Lakers win series, 4–1

AdventHealth Arena, Bay Lake, Florida
Referees: John Goble, Eric Lewis, Bill Kennedy

Regular-season series
Houston won 2–1 in the regular-season series

January 18, 2020

Recap

Los Angeles Lakers 124, Houston Rockets 115

Toyota Center, Houston, Texas

February 6, 2020

Recap

Houston Rockets 121, Los Angeles Lakers 111

Staples Center, Los Angeles, California

August 6, 2020

Recap

Los Angeles Lakers 97, Houston Rockets 113

AdventHealth Arena, Bay Lake, Florida

This was the ninth playoff meeting between these two teams, with the Lakers winning five of the first eight meetings.

Previous playoffs series
LA Lakers leads 5–3 in all-time playoff series

1981

Houston Rockets 2, Los Angeles Lakers 1

1981 Western Conference first round

1986

Houston Rockets 4, Los Angeles Lakers 1

1986 Western Conference finals

1990

Houston Rockets 1, Los Angeles Lakers 3

1990 Western Conference first round

1991

Houston Rockets 0, Los Angeles Lakers 3

1991 Western Conference first round

1996

Houston Rockets 3, Los Angeles Lakers 1

1996 Western Conference first round

1999

Houston Rockets 1, Los Angeles Lakers 3

1999 Western Conference first round

2004

Houston Rockets 1, Los Angeles Lakers 4

2004 Western Conference first round

2009

Houston Rockets 3, Los Angeles Lakers 4

2009 Western Conference semifinals

==== (2) Los Angeles Clippers vs. (3) Denver Nuggets ====
TNT

September 3
9:00pm

Recap

Denver Nuggets 97, Los Angeles Clippers 120
Scoring by quarter: 31–31, 20–38, 16–22, 30–29
| Pts: Nikola Jokić 15; Rebs: Paul Millsap 9 Asts: Jamal Murray 6 | Pts: Kawhi Leonard 29; Rebs: three players 7 each Asts: George, Williams 4 each |
LA Clippers lead series, 1–0

AdventHealth Arena, Bay Lake, Florida
Referees: Zach Zarba, Eric Lewis, James Williams

TNT

September 5
9:00pm

Recap

Denver Nuggets 110, Los Angeles Clippers 101
Scoring by quarter: 44–25, 28–31, 17–21, 21–24
| Pts: Jamal Murray 27; Rebs: Nikola Jokić 18; Asts: Jamal Murray 6 | Pts: Paul George 22; Rebs: JaMychal Green 11; Asts: Kawhi Leonard 8 |
Series tied, 1–1

AdventHealth Arena, Bay Lake, Florida
Referees: James Capers, Pat Fraher, Tre Maddox

TNT

September 7
9:00pm

Recap

Los Angeles Clippers 113, Denver Nuggets 107
Scoring by quarter: 33–32, 24–27, 27–29, 29–19
| Pts: Paul George 32; Rebs: Kawhi Leonard 14; Asts: Kawhi Leonard 6 | Pts: Nikola Jokić 32; Rebs: Nikola Jokić 12; Asts: Jamal Murray 9 |
LA Clippers lead series, 2–1

AdventHealth Arena, Bay Lake, Florida
Referees: John Goble, Tony Brown, Ed Malloy

ESPN

September 9
9:00pm

Recap

Los Angeles Clippers 96, Denver Nuggets 85
Scoring by quarter: 26–12, 22–28, 25–23, 23–22
| Pts: Kawhi Leonard 30; Rebs: Kawhi Leonard 11; Asts: Kawhi Leonard 9 | Pts: Nikola Jokić 26; Rebs: Nikola Jokić 11; Asts: Jamal Murray 7 |
LA Clippers lead series, 3–1

AdventHealth Arena, Bay Lake, Florida
Referees: Scott Foster, David Guthrie, Bill Kennedy

TNT

September 11
6:30pm

Recap

Denver Nuggets 111, Los Angeles Clippers 105
Scoring by quarter: 23–28, 21–28, 29–24, 38–25
| Pts: Jamal Murray 26; Rebs: Nikola Jokić 14; Asts: Jamal Murray 7 | Pts: Kawhi Leonard 36; Rebs: Leonard, Zubac 9 each Asts: Paul George 6 |
LA Clippers lead series, 3–2

HP Field House, Bay Lake, Florida
Referees: Marc Davis, Tony Brothers, Kevin Scott

ESPN

September 13
1:00pm

Recap

Los Angeles Clippers 98, Denver Nuggets 111
Scoring by quarter: 34–26, 29–21, 16–30, 19–34
| Pts: Paul George 33; Rebs: Ivica Zubac 12; Asts: Kawhi Leonard 5 | Pts: Nikola Jokić 34; Rebs: Nikola Jokić 14; Asts: Nikola Jokić 7 |
Series tied, 3–3

AdventHealth Arena, Bay Lake, Florida
Referees: Kane Fitzgerald, Josh Tiven, Tre Maddox

ESPN

September 15
9:00pm

Recap

Denver Nuggets 104, Los Angeles Clippers 89
Scoring by quarter: 24–24, 30–32, 28–18, 22–15
| Pts: Jamal Murray 40; Rebs: Nikola Jokić 22; Asts: Nikola Jokić 13 | Pts: Montrezl Harrell 20; Rebs: Leonard, Morris, Green 6 each Asts: Leonard, Beverley, Williams 6 each |
Denver wins series, 4–3

AdventHealth Arena, Bay Lake, Florida
Referees: James Capers, John Goble, Eric Lewis

- Denver became the first NBA team to overcome a 3–1 deficit twice in the same playoffs, and the first time an NBA franchise did so twice in the same decade. This also marked the Nuggets first Conference Finals appearance since 2009.
- This was the second time the Clippers blew a 3–1 in a playoff series (previously occurred in 2015 against the Houston Rockets). Furthermore, Game 7 would be Doc Rivers' last game as L.A.'s head coach as he would fired following the loss.

Regular-season series
LA Clippers won 2–1 in the regular-season series

January 12, 2020

Recap

Los Angeles Clippers 104, Denver Nuggets 114

Pepsi Center, Denver, Colorado

February 28, 2020

Recap

Denver Nuggets 103, Los Angeles Clippers 132

Staples Center, Los Angeles, California

August 12, 2020

Recap

Los Angeles Clippers 124, Denver Nuggets 111

AdventHealth Arena, Bay Lake, Florida

This was the second playoff meeting between these two teams, with the Clippers winning the previous meeting.

Previous playoffs series
LA Clippers lead 1–0 in all-time playoff series

2006

Denver Nuggets 1, Los Angeles Clippers 4

2006 Western Conference first round

== Conference finals ==
Note: All times are EDT (UTC−4) as listed by the NBA. All games were played behind closed doors at the ESPN Wide World of Sports Complex in Walt Disney World.

=== Eastern Conference finals ===
==== (3) Boston Celtics vs. (5) Miami Heat ====
ESPN

September 15
6:30pm

Recap

Miami Heat 117, Boston Celtics 114 (OT)
Scoring by quarter: 18–26, 37–29, 16–28, 35–23, Overtime: 11–8
| Pts: Goran Dragić 29; Rebs: Tyler Herro 11; Asts: Adebayo, Herro 9 each | Pts: Jayson Tatum 30; Rebs: Jayson Tatum 14; Asts: Walker, Wanamaker 6 each |
Miami leads series, 1–0

HP Field House, Bay Lake, Florida
Referees: Marc Davis, Kane Fitzgerald, Sean Wright

In an unprecedented manner, Mark Jones and Doris Burke called Game 1 while Mike Breen, Jeff Van Gundy, and Mark Jackson, were in charge for Game 7 of the 2020 Western Conference Semifinals between the Los Angeles Clippers and the Denver Nuggets (see above). Starting with Game 2, Breen, Van Gundy, and Jackson took the remainder of the Conference Finals and the NBA Finals while Burke is assigned to ESPN Radio. Burke would have left the radio team when she was promoted to the lead team on television in 2023

ESPN

September 17
7:00pm

Recap

Miami Heat 106, Boston Celtics 101
Scoring by quarter: 28–31, 19–29, 37–17, 22–24
| Pts: Goran Dragić 25; Rebs: Bam Adebayo 10; Asts: Dragić, Herro 5 each | Pts: Kemba Walker 23; Rebs: Daniel Theis 8 Asts: Smart, Tatum 4 each |
Miami leads series, 2–0

AdventHealth Arena, Bay Lake, Florida
Referees: James Capers, David Guthrie, Tony Brown

ESPN

September 19
8:30pm

Recap

Boston Celtics 117, Miami Heat 106
Scoring by quarter: 31–22, 32–28, 26–24, 28–32
| Pts: Jaylen Brown 26; Rebs: Jayson Tatum 14; Asts: Jayson Tatum 8 | Pts: Bam Adebayo 27; Rebs: Bam Adebayo 16; Asts: Crowder, Dragić 5 each |
Miami leads series, 2–1

AdventHealth Arena, Bay Lake, Florida
Referees: Zach Zarba, Eric Lewis, Pat Fraher

ESPN

September 23
8:30pm

Recap

Boston Celtics 109, Miami Heat 112
Scoring by quarter: 23–24, 21–26, 32–27, 33–35
| Pts: Jayson Tatum 28; Rebs: Brown, Tatum, Theis 9 each Asts: Marcus Smart 11 | Pts: Tyler Herro 37; Rebs: Bam Adebayo 12; Asts: Bam Adebayo 4 |
Miami leads series, 3–1

AdventHealth Arena, Bay Lake, Florida
Referees: Scott Foster, Tony Brothers, Tre Maddox

ESPN

September 25
8:30pm

Recap

Miami Heat 108, Boston Celtics 121
Scoring by quarter: 26–18, 32–33, 25–41, 25–29
| Pts: Goran Dragić 23; Rebs: Adebayo, Butler 8 each Asts: Adebayo, Butler 8 each | Pts: Jayson Tatum 31; Rebs: Daniel Theis 13; Asts: Marcus Smart 8 |
Miami leads series, 3–2

AdventHealth Arena, Bay Lake, Florida
Referees: John Goble, Josh Tiven, Kevin Scott

ESPN

September 27
7:30pm

Recap

Boston Celtics 113, Miami Heat 125
Scoring by quarter: 27–33, 33–29, 26–26, 27–37
| Pts: Jaylen Brown 26; Rebs: Brown, Smart 8 each Asts: Jayson Tatum 11 | Pts: Bam Adebayo 32; Rebs: Bam Adebayo 14; Asts: Jimmy Butler 8 |
Miami wins series, 4–2

AdventHealth Arena, Bay Lake, Florida
Referees: Marc Davis, Kane Fitzgerald, Pat Fraher

Regular-season series
Boston won 2–1 in the regular-season series

December 4, 2019

Recap

Miami Heat 93, Boston Celtics 112

TD Garden, Boston, Massachusetts

January 28, 2020

Recap

Boston Celtics 109, Miami Heat 101

American Airlines Arena, Miami, Florida

August 4, 2020

Recap

Miami Heat 112, Boston Celtics 106

HP Field House, Bay Lake, Florida

This was the fourth playoff meeting between the two teams, with the Heat winning two of the first three meetings.

Previous playoffs series
Miami leads 2–1 in all-time playoff series

2010

Miami Heat 1, Boston Celtics 4

2010 Eastern Conference first round

2011

Boston Celtics 1, Miami Heat 4

2011 Eastern Conference semifinals

2012

Boston Celtics 3, Miami Heat 4

2012 Eastern Conference finals

=== Western Conference finals ===
==== (1) Los Angeles Lakers vs. (3) Denver Nuggets ====
TNT

September 18
9:00 PM

Recap

Denver Nuggets 114, Los Angeles Lakers 126
Scoring by quarter: 38–36, 21–34, 20–33, 33–23
| Pts: Jokić, Murray 21 each Rebs: Michael Porter Jr. 10; Asts: Jamal Murray 5 | Pts: Anthony Davis 37; Rebs: Anthony Davis 10; Asts: LeBron James 12 |
LA Lakers lead series, 1–0

AdventHealth Arena, Bay Lake, Florida
Referees: Scott Foster, Tony Brothers, Courtney Kirkland

TNT

September 20
7:30 PM

Recap

Denver Nuggets 103, Los Angeles Lakers 105
Scoring by quarter: 21–29, 29–31, 28–22, 25–23
| Pts: Nikola Jokić 30; Rebs: Paul Millsap 8 Asts: Nikola Jokić 9 | Pts: Anthony Davis 31; Rebs: LeBron James 11; Asts: Rajon Rondo 9 |
LA Lakers lead series, 2–0

AdventHealth Arena, Bay Lake, Florida
Referees: John Goble, Josh Tiven, Bill Kennedy

Anthony Davis scored 31 points, including a 3-point shot over Nikola Jokić at the buzzer, to give the Lakers a 2–0 lead in the Western Conference finals.

TNT

September 22
9:00 PM

Recap

Los Angeles Lakers 106, Denver Nuggets 114
Scoring by quarter: 27–29, 26–34, 22–30, 31–21
| Pts: LeBron James 30; Rebs: LeBron James 10; Asts: LeBron James 11 | Pts: Jamal Murray 28; Rebs: Nikola Jokić 10; Asts: Jamal Murray 12 |
LA Lakers lead series, 2–1

AdventHealth Arena, Bay Lake, Florida
Referees: Marc Davis, Kane Fitzgerald, Kevin Scott

TNT

September 24
9:00 PM

Recap

Los Angeles Lakers 114, Denver Nuggets 108
Scoring by quarter: 37–30, 23–25, 27–29, 27–24
| Pts: Anthony Davis 34; Rebs: Dwight Howard 11; Asts: LeBron James 8 | Pts: Jamal Murray 32; Rebs: Michael Porter Jr. 8 Asts: Jamal Murray 8 |
LA Lakers lead series, 3–1

AdventHealth Arena, Bay Lake, Florida
Referees: James Capers, David Guthrie, Rodney Mott

TNT

September 26
9:00 PM

Recap

Denver Nuggets 107, Los Angeles Lakers 117
Scoring by quarter: 30–33, 21–28, 33–26, 23–30
| Pts: Grant, Jokić 20 each Rebs: Jerami Grant 9 Asts: Jamal Murray 8 | Pts: LeBron James 38; Rebs: LeBron James 16; Asts: LeBron James 10 |
LA Lakers win series, 4–1

AdventHealth Arena, Bay Lake, Florida
Referees: Zach Zarba, Eric Lewis, Tony Brown

Regular-season series
LA Lakers won 3–1 in the regular-season series

December 3, 2019

Recap

Los Angeles Lakers 105, Denver Nuggets 96

Pepsi Center, Denver, Colorado

December 22, 2019

Recap

Denver Nuggets 128, Los Angeles Lakers 104

Staples Center, Los Angeles, California

February 12, 2020

Recap

Los Angeles Lakers 120, Denver Nuggets 116 (OT)

Pepsi Center, Denver, Colorado

August 10, 2020

Recap

Denver Nuggets 121, Los Angeles Lakers 124

AdventHealth Arena, Bay Lake, Florida

This was the seventh playoff meeting between these two teams, with the Lakers winning the first six meetings.

Previous playoffs series
LA Lakers lead 6–0 in all-time playoff series

1979

Los Angeles Lakers 2, Denver Nuggets 1

1979 Western Conference first round

1985

Denver Nuggets 1, Los Angeles Lakers 4

1985 Western Conference finals

1987

Denver Nuggets 0, Los Angeles Lakers 3

1987 Western Conference first round

2008

Denver Nuggets 0, Los Angeles Lakers 4

2008 Western Conference first round

2009

Denver Nuggets 2, Los Angeles Lakers 4

2009 Western Conference finals

2012

Denver Nuggets 3, Los Angeles Lakers 4

2012 Western Conference first round

== NBA Finals: (W1) Los Angeles Lakers vs. (E5) Miami Heat ==
Note: All times are EDT (UTC−4) as listed by the NBA. All games were played behind closed doors at the ESPN Wide World of Sports Complex in Walt Disney World.

ABC

September 30
9:00pm

Recap

Miami Heat 98, Los Angeles Lakers 116
Scoring by quarter: 28–31, 20–34, 19–28, 31–23
| Pts: Jimmy Butler 23; Rebs: Iguodala, Nunn, Olynyk 5 each Asts: Andre Iguodala 6 | Pts: Anthony Davis 34; Rebs: LeBron James 13; Asts: LeBron James 9 |
LA Lakers lead series, 1–0

AdventHealth Arena, Bay Lake, Florida
Referees: Marc Davis, Kane Fitzgerald, Josh Tiven

ABC

October 2
9:00pm

Recap

Miami Heat 114, Los Angeles Lakers 124
Scoring by quarter: 23–29, 31–39, 39–35, 21–21
| Pts: Jimmy Butler 25; Rebs: Kelly Olynyk 9 Asts: Jimmy Butler 13 | Pts: LeBron James 33; Rebs: Anthony Davis 14; Asts: Rajon Rondo 10 |
LA Lakers lead series, 2–0

AdventHealth Arena, Bay Lake, Florida
Referees: James Capers, David Guthrie, Eric Lewis

ABC

October 4
7:30pm

Recap

Los Angeles Lakers 104, Miami Heat 115
Scoring by quarter: 23–26, 31–32, 26–27, 24–30
| Pts: LeBron James 25; Rebs: LeBron James 10; Asts: LeBron James 8 | Pts: Jimmy Butler 40; Rebs: Jimmy Butler 11; Asts: Jimmy Butler 13 |
LA Lakers lead series, 2–1

AdventHealth Arena, Bay Lake, Florida
Referees: Scott Foster, Tony Brothers, Pat Fraher

ABC

October 6
9:00pm

Recap

Los Angeles Lakers 102, Miami Heat 96
Scoring by quarter: 27–22, 22–25, 26–23, 27–26
| Pts: LeBron James 28; Rebs: LeBron James 12; Asts: LeBron James 8 | Pts: Jimmy Butler 22; Rebs: Jimmy Butler 10; Asts: Jimmy Butler 9 |
LA Lakers lead series, 3–1

AdventHealth Arena, Bay Lake, Florida
Referees: Zach Zarba, John Goble, Tony Brown

ABC

October 9
9:00pm

Recap

Miami Heat 111, Los Angeles Lakers 108
Scoring by quarter: 25–24, 35–32, 28–26, 23–26
| Pts: Jimmy Butler 35; Rebs: Jimmy Butler 12; Asts: Jimmy Butler 11 | Pts: LeBron James 40; Rebs: LeBron James 13; Asts: LeBron James 7 |
LA Lakers lead series, 3–2

AdventHealth Arena, Bay Lake, Florida
Referees: Marc Davis, Kane Fitzgerald, Eric Lewis

ABC

October 11
7:30pm

Recap

Los Angeles Lakers 106, Miami Heat 93
Scoring by quarter: 28–20, 36–16, 23–22, 19–35
| Pts: LeBron James 28; Rebs: Anthony Davis 15; Asts: LeBron James 10 | Pts: Bam Adebayo 25; Rebs: Bam Adebayo 10; Asts: Jimmy Butler 8 |
LA Lakers win series, 4–2

AdventHealth Arena, Bay Lake, Florida
Referees: James Capers, Tony Brothers, David Guthrie

Regular-season series
LA Lakers won 2–0 in the regular-season series

November 8, 2019

Recap

Miami Heat 80, Los Angeles Lakers 95

Staples Center, Los Angeles, California

December 13, 2019

Recap

Los Angeles Lakers 113, Miami Heat 110

American Airlines Arena, Miami, Florida

This was the first playoff meeting between the Lakers and the Heat.

== Statistical leaders ==
| Category | Game high | | | Average | | | |
| Category | Player | Team | High | Player | Team | Avg. | GP |
|---|---|---|---|---|---|---|---|
| Points | Donovan Mitchell | Utah Jazz | 57 | Donovan Mitchell | Utah Jazz | 36.3 | 7 |
| Rebounds | Nikola Jokić | Denver Nuggets | 22 | Jarrett Allen | Brooklyn Nets | 14.8 | 4 |
| Assists | LeBron James | Los Angeles Lakers | 16 | Malcolm Brogdon | Indiana Pacers | 10.0 | 4 |
| Steals | Fred VanVleet | Toronto Raptors | 6 | Robert Covington | Houston Rockets | 2.5 | 12 |
| Blocks | Hassan Whiteside; Myles Turner | Portland Trail Blazers; Indiana Pacers | 5 | Myles Turner | Indiana Pacers | 4.0 | 4 |

== Media coverage ==
=== Television ===
ESPN, ABC, TNT, and NBA TV broadcast the playoffs nationally in the United States. During the first two rounds, games were split between TNT, ESPN, and ABC regardless of conference. With the start of the playoffs delayed to August, some games played during the weekday afternoon, and games postponed by the wildcat strike, the TV schedule for the first two rounds differed from previous seasons due to scheduling conflicts. For instance, TNT aired some Friday games instead of its usual Sunday through Thursday schedule. Likewise ESPN broadcast games on some of those days when TNT would normally air them. Also, ABC aired a rare Tuesday night first-round game on September 1. NBA TV also televised selected games in the first round. Regional sports networks affiliated with the teams also broadcast the games, except for games televised on ABC.

TNT exclusively aired the NBA Western Conference finals while ESPN televised the NBA Eastern Conference finals. ABC had exclusive television rights to the 2020 NBA Finals, which was the 18th consecutive year for the network.

In Canada, the home market of the Toronto Raptors, national broadcast rights were split approximately equally between the Sportsnet and TSN groups of channels. Separate Canadian broadcasts were produced for all games involving the Raptors regardless of round or U.S. broadcaster.
