= 2019–20 Indiana Pacers season =

NBA professional basketball team season

- Head coach: Nate McMillan
- President: Kevin Pritchard
- General manager: Chad Buchanan
- Owners: Herbert Simon
- Arena: Bankers Life Fieldhouse

Results
- Record: 45–28 (.616)
- Place: Division: 2nd (Central); Conference: 4th (Eastern)
- Playoff finish: First round (lost to Heat 0–4)
- Stats at Basketball Reference

Local media
- Television: Fox Sports Indiana
- Radio: 1070 The Fan

The 2019–20 Indiana Pacers season was the franchise's 53rd season and the 44th season in the NBA.

The season was suspended by the league officials following the games of March 11 after it was reported that Rudy Gobert tested positive for COVID-19. The season for the Pacers and 21 other playoff-contending teams resumed in the 2020 NBA Bubble on July 30, with Indiana finishing the season in the bubble with a 45–28 record and the fourth seed in the Eastern Conference.

The Pacers were defeated in four games by the eventual Eastern Conference champion Miami Heat in the first round of the playoffs. For the second straight year (having been swept by the Boston Celtics the previous year), and the third time in four years the Pacers were swept in the playoffs, and the loss marked their fifth consecutive defeat in the first round. Head coach Nate McMillan was subsequently fired after four seasons, having failed to win a playoff series with a 3–16 postseason record.

== NBA draft ==
Round	Pick	Player	Position	Nationality	College/Club
1	18	Goga Bitadze	Center	(Georgia (country)) Georgia	(Serbia) Mega Bemax (Montenegro) Budućnost VOLI
2	50	Jarrell Brantley	Power Forward	United States	Charleston

Entering draft night, the Pacers held a first and a second-round draft pick. The 50th pick was traded to the Utah Jazz for cash considerations.

== Roster ==
2019–20 Indiana Pacers roster
Players

Pos.	No.	Player	Height	Weight	DOB	From
C	88	Goga Bitadze	6 ft 11 in (2.11 m)	250 lb (113 kg)	1999–07–20	Georgia
G	10	Brian Bowen (TW)	6 ft 6 in (1.98 m)	190 lb (86 kg)	1998–10–02	La Lumiere (IN)
G	7	Malcolm Brogdon	6 ft 5 in (1.96 m)	229 lb (104 kg)	1992–12–11	Virginia
G	3	Aaron Holiday	6 ft 0 in (1.83 m)	185 lb (84 kg)	1996–09–30	UCLA
G	8	Justin Holiday	6 ft 6 in (1.98 m)	180 lb (82 kg)	1989–04–05	Washington
F	24	Alize Johnson	6 ft 9 in (2.06 m)	212 lb (96 kg)	1996–04–22	Missouri State
G	26	Jeremy Lamb	6 ft 5 in (1.96 m)	180 lb (82 kg)	1992–05–30	Connecticut
F	22	T. J. Leaf	6 ft 10 in (2.08 m)	222 lb (101 kg)	1997–04–30	UCLA
G	9	T. J. McConnell	6 ft 1 in (1.85 m)	190 lb (86 kg)	1992–03–25	Arizona
F	20	Doug McDermott	6 ft 8 in (2.03 m)	225 lb (102 kg)	1992–01–03	Creighton
G	15	Naz Mitrou-Long (TW)	6 ft 3 in (1.91 m)	218 lb (99 kg)	1993–08–03	Iowa State
G	4	Victor Oladipo	6 ft 4 in (1.93 m)	213 lb (97 kg)	1992–05–04	Indiana
F/C	11	Domantas Sabonis	6 ft 11 in (2.11 m)	240 lb (109 kg)	1996–05–03	Gonzaga
F	14	JaKarr Sampson	6 ft 9 in (2.06 m)	214 lb (97 kg)	1993–02–20	St. John's
G	5	Edmond Sumner	6 ft 4 in (1.93 m)	196 lb (89 kg)	1995–12–31	Xavier
C	33	Myles Turner	7 ft 0 in (2.13 m)	255 lb (116 kg)	1996–03–24	Texas
F	1	T. J. Warren	6 ft 8 in (2.03 m)	220 lb (100 kg)	1993–09–05	NC State

Coaches
Head coach
- Nate McMillan
Assistant(s)
- Bill Bayno
- Dan Burke
- Popeye Jones

Legend
- (DP) Unsigned draft pick
- (FA) Free agent
- (S) Suspended
- (GL) On assignment to G League affiliate
- (TW) Two-way affiliate player
- Injured

Roster
Updated: 2019–10–09

== Standings ==
=== Division ===
Central Division	W	L	PCT	GB	Home	Road	Div	GP
z – Milwaukee Bucks	56	17	.767	–	30‍–‍5	26‍–‍12	13–1	73
x – Indiana Pacers	45	28	.616	11.0	25‍–‍11	20‍–‍17	8–7	73
Chicago Bulls	22	43	.338	30.0	14‍–‍20	8‍–‍23	7–9	65
Detroit Pistons	20	46	.303	32.5	11‍–‍22	9‍–‍24	5–10	66
Cleveland Cavaliers	19	46	.292	33.0	11‍–‍25	8‍–‍21	4–10	65

=== Conference ===
Eastern Conference
#	Team	W	L	PCT	GB	GP
1	z – Milwaukee Bucks *	56	17	.767	–	73
2	y – Toronto Raptors *	53	19	.736	2.5	72
3	x – Boston Celtics	48	24	.667	7.5	72
4	x – Indiana Pacers	45	28	.616	11.0	73
5	y – Miami Heat *	44	29	.603	12.0	73
6	x – Philadelphia 76ers	43	30	.589	13.0	73
7	x – Brooklyn Nets	35	37	.486	20.5	72
8	x – Orlando Magic	33	40	.452	23.0	73
9	Washington Wizards	25	47	.347	30.5	72
10	Charlotte Hornets	23	42	.354	29.0	65
11	Chicago Bulls	22	43	.338	30.0	65
12	New York Knicks	21	45	.318	31.5	66
13	Detroit Pistons	20	46	.303	32.5	66
14	Atlanta Hawks	20	47	.299	33.0	67
15	Cleveland Cavaliers	19	46	.292	33.0	65

== Game log ==
=== Regular season ===
2019–20 game log
Total: 45–28 (home: 25–11; road: 20–17)
October: 1–3 (home: 0–1; road: 1–2)

Game	Date	Team	Score	High points	High rebounds	High assists	Location Attendance	Record
1	October 23	Detroit	L 110–119	Domantas Sabonis (27)	Domantas Sabonis (13)	Malcolm Brogdon (11)	Bankers Life Fieldhouse; 17,923	0–1
2	October 26	@ Cleveland	L 99–110	Malcolm Brogdon (30)	Myles Turner (11)	Malcolm Brogdon (10)	Rocket Mortgage FieldHouse; 19,432	0–2
3	October 28	@ Detroit	L 94–96	Domantas Sabonis (21)	Domantas Sabonis (14)	Malcolm Brogdon (11)	Little Caesars Arena; 13,565	0–3
4	October 30	@ Brooklyn	W 118–108	Domantas Sabonis (29)	Domantas Sabonis (8)	Malcolm Brogdon (13)	Barclays Center; 17,083	1–3

November: 11–4 (home: 9–1; road: 2–3)

Game	Date	Team	Score	High points	High rebounds	High assists	Location Attendance	Record
5	November 1	Cleveland	W 102–95	Malcolm Brogdon (25)	Domantas Sabonis (17)	Brogdon, McConnell (6)	Bankers Life Fieldhouse; 16,079	2–3
6	November 3	Chicago	W 108–95	T. J. Warren (26)	T. J. Leaf (15)	Malcolm Brogdon (7)	Bankers Life Fieldhouse; 17,073	3–3
7	November 5	@ Charlotte	L 120–122 (OT)	T. J. Warren (33)	Goga Bitadze (11)	Malcolm Brogdon (8)	Spectrum Center; 13,341	3–4
8	November 6	Washington	W 121–106	T. J. Warren (21)	Domantas Sabonis (17)	Malcolm Brogdon (13)	Bankers Life Fieldhouse; 16,171	4–4
9	November 8	Detroit	W 112–106	Warren, Sabonis, McConnell (17)	Domantas Sabonis (14)	T. J. McConnell (9)	Bankers Life Fieldhouse; 15,544	5–4
10	November 10	@ Orlando	W 109–102	Domantas Sabonis (21)	Domantas Sabonis (16)	Brogdon, McConnell (8)	Amway Center; 17,118	6–4
11	November 12	Oklahoma City	W 111–85	T. J. Warren (23)	Domantas Sabonis (16)	Malcolm Brogdon (5)	Bankers Life Fieldhouse; 15,838	7–4
12	November 15	@ Houston	L 102–111	Sabonis, McDermott (18)	Domantas Sabonis (13)	T. J. McConnell (7)	Toyota Center; 18,055	7–5
13	November 16	Milwaukee	L 83–102	Myles Turner (16)	Domantas Sabonis (14)	Aaron Holiday (5)	Bankers Life Fieldhouse; 17,024	7–6
14	November 18	@ Brooklyn	W 115–86	Aaron Holiday (24)	Domantas Sabonis (18)	Aaron Holiday (13)	Barclays Center; 14,140	8–6
15	November 23	Orlando	W 111–106	Domantas Sabonis (25)	Domantas Sabonis (9)	T. J. McConnell (7)	Bankers Life Fieldhouse; 16,446	9–6
16	November 25	Memphis	W 126–114	T. J. Warren (26)	Domantas Sabonis (13)	Malcolm Brogdon (8)	Bankers Life Fieldhouse; 15,141	10–6
17	November 27	Utah	W 121–102	Sabonis, Warren (23)	Domantas Sabonis (12)	Malcolm Brogdon (8)	Bankers Life Fieldhouse; 17,027	11–6
18	November 29	Atlanta	W 105–104 (OT)	Jeremy Lamb (20)	Domantas Sabonis (12)	Malcolm Brogdon (7)	Bankers Life Fieldhouse; 15,827	12–6
19	November 30	@ Philadelphia	L 116–119	T. J. Warren (29)	Domantas Sabonis (10)	Malcolm Brogdon (6)	Wells Fargo Center; 20,517	12–7

December: 10–5 (home: 6–1; road: 4–4)

Game	Date	Team	Score	High points	High rebounds	High assists	Location Attendance	Record
20	December 2	@ Memphis	W 117–104	Malcolm Brogdon (19)	Domantas Sabonis (14)	Malcolm Brogdon (9)	FedExForum; 11,919	13–7
21	December 4	@ Oklahoma City	W 107–100	T. J. Warren (24)	Domantas Sabonis (13)	T. J. McConnell (8)	Chesapeake Energy Arena; 18,203	14–7
22	December 6	@ Detroit	L 101–108	T. J. Warren (26)	Domantas Sabonis (13)	Brogdon, Sabonis (5)	Little Caesars Arena; 14,894	14–8
23	December 7	@ New York	W 104–103	T. J. Warren (25)	Domantas Sabonis (15)	T. J. McConnell (11)	Madison Square Garden; 19,110	15–8
24	December 9	L. A. Clippers	L 99–110	Malcolm Brogdon (20)	Domantas Sabonis (22)	Domantas Sabonis (4)	Bankers Life Fieldhouse; 14,644	15–9
25	December 11	Boston	W 122–117	Malcolm Brogdon (29)	Domantas Sabonis (14)	Brogdon, Sabonis (8)	Bankers Life Fieldhouse; 15,637	16–9
26	December 13	@ Atlanta	W 110–100	Malcolm Brogdon (19)	Domantas Sabonis (14)	Malcolm Brogdon (12)	State Farm Arena; 15,121	17–9
27	December 15	Charlotte	W 107–85	Aaron Holiday (23)	Domantas Sabonis (12)	T. J. McConnell (8)	Bankers Life Fieldhouse; 16,061	18–9
28	December 17	L. A. Lakers	W 105–102	Domantas Sabonis (26)	Domantas Sabonis (10)	Malcolm Brogdon (6)	Bankers Life Fieldhouse; 17,923	19–9
29	December 20	Sacramento	W 119–105	T. J. Warren (23)	Domantas Sabonis (9)	T. J. McConnell (8)	Bankers Life Fieldhouse; 14,649	20–9
30	December 22	@ Milwaukee	L 89–117	Domantas Sabonis (19)	Domantas Sabonis (18)	Malcolm Brogdon (10)	Fiserv Forum; 18,029	20–10
31	December 23	Toronto	W 120–115 (OT)	Turner, Warren (24)	Domantas Sabonis (17)	Aaron Holiday (13)	Bankers Life Fieldhouse; 17,164	21–10
32	December 27	@ Miami	L 112–113	Aaron Holiday (17)	Domantas Sabonis (7)	Aaron Holiday (9)	American Airlines Arena; 19,767	21–11
33	December 28	@ New Orleans	L 98–120	Aaron Holiday (25)	Domantas Sabonis (16)	T. J. McConnell (6)	Smoothie King Center; 15,391	21–12
34	December 31	Philadelphia	W 115–97	Domantas Sabonis (23)	Domantas Sabonis (10)	T. J. McConnell (10)	Bankers Life Fieldhouse; 17,923	22–12

January: 9–5 (home: 3–2; road: 6–3)

Game	Date	Team	Score	High points	High rebounds	High assists	Location Attendance	Record
35	January 2	Denver	L 116–124	Jeremy Lamb (30)	Domantas Sabonis (9)	Aaron Holiday (10)	Bankers Life Fieldhouse; 16,688	22–13
36	January 4	@ Atlanta	L 111–116	Domantas Sabonis (25)	Domantas Sabonis (11)	Aaron Holiday (6)	State Farm Arena; 16,420	22–14
37	January 6	@ Charlotte	W 115–104	T. J. Warren (36)	Domantas Sabonis (12)	Sabonis, McConnell (7)	Spectrum Center; 13,009	23–14
38	January 8	Miami	L 108–122	Domantas Sabonis (27)	Domantas Sabonis (14)	Domantas Sabonis (6)	Bankers Life Fieldhouse; 17,040	23–15
39	January 10	@ Chicago	W 116–105	Myles Turner (27)	Myles Turner (14)	Aaron Holiday (8)	United Center; 20,229	24–15
40	January 13	Philadelphia	W 101–95	Warren, Brogdon (21)	Domantas Sabonis (16)	Malcolm Brogdon (9)	Bankers Life Fieldhouse; 15,257	25–15
41	January 15	@ Minnesota	W 104–99	Domantas Sabonis (29)	Domantas Sabonis (13)	T. J. McConnell (8)	Target Center; 12,648	26–15
42	January 17	Minnesota	W 116–114	T. J. Warren (28)	Doug McDermott (8)	Malcolm Brogdon (10)	Bankers Life Fieldhouse; 16,248	27–15
43	January 19	@ Denver	W 115–107	Doug McDermott (24)	Domantas Sabonis (15)	Domantas Sabonis (10)	Pepsi Center; 19,520	28–15
44	January 20	@ Utah	L 88–118	Turner, Holiday (12)	Domantas Sabonis (8)	T. J. McConnell (10)	Vivint Smart Home Arena; 18,306	28–16
45	January 22	@ Phoenix	W 112–87	T. J. Warren (25)	Domantas Sabonis (13)	T. J. McConnell (11)	Talking Stick Resort Arena; 14,691	29–16
46	January 24	@ Golden State	W 129–118	T. J. Warren (33)	Domantas Sabonis (10)	McConnell, Sabonis (8)	Chase Center; 18,064	30–16
47	January 26	@ Portland	L 129–139	Jeremy Lamb (28)	Domantas Sabonis (14)	Domantas Sabonis (11)	Moda Center; 19,663	30–17
48	January 29	Chicago	W 115–106 (OT)	T. J. Warren (25)	Domantas Sabonis (11)	Malcolm Brogdon (9)	Bankers Life Fieldhouse; 17,923	31–17

February: 5–7 (home: 3–5; road: 2–2)

Game	Date	Team	Score	High points	High rebounds	High assists	Location Attendance	Record
49	February 1	New York	L 85–92	Domantas Sabonis (25)	Domantas Sabonis (8)	Malcolm Brogdon (12)	Bankers Life Fieldhouse; 17,923	31–18
50	February 3	Dallas	L 103–112	Domantas Sabonis (26)	Domantas Sabonis (12)	Domantas Sabonis (9)	Bankers Life Fieldhouse; 15,086	31–19
51	February 5	@ Toronto	L 118–119	Malcolm Brogdon (24)	Domantas Sabonis (11)	Domantas Sabonis (10)	Scotiabank Arena; 19,800	31–20
52	February 7	Toronto	L 106–115	Domantas Sabonis (19)	Domantas Sabonis (16)	Malcolm Brogdon (8)	Bankers Life Fieldhouse; 17,028	31–21
53	February 8	New Orleans	L 117–124	Jeremy Lamb (26)	Brogdon, Sabonis, Turner (8)	Brogdon, Sabonis (6)	Bankers Life Fieldhouse; 17,923	31–22
54	February 10	Brooklyn	L 105–106	Domantas Sabonis (23)	Domantas Sabonis (10)	Domantas Sabonis (11)	Bankers Life Fieldhouse; 16,761	31–23
55	February 12	Milwaukee	W 118–111	T. J. Warren (35)	Myles Turner (10)	Malcolm Brogdon (13)	Bankers Life Fieldhouse; 17,018	32–23
56	February 21	@ New York	W 106–98	T. J. Warren (27)	Domantas Sabonis (13)	Malcolm Brogdon (6)	Madison Square Garden; 19,812	33–23
57	February 23	@ Toronto	L 81–127	Holiday, Sabonis (14)	Domantas Sabonis (11)	Aaron Holiday (6)	Scotiabank Arena; 19,800	33–24
58	February 25	Charlotte	W 119–80	Domantas Sabonis (21)	Domantas Sabonis (15)	Domantas Sabonis (9)	Bankers Life Fieldhouse; 16,088	34–24
59	February 27	Portland	W 106–100	Domantas Sabonis (20)	Domantas Sabonis (11)	Malcolm Brogdon (8)	Bankers Life Fieldhouse; 16,872	35–24
60	February 29	@ Cleveland	W 113–104	T. J. Warren (30)	Domantas Sabonis (13)	Domantas Sabonis (9)	Rocket Mortgage FieldHouse; 19,432	36–24

March: 3–2 (home: 0–1; road: 3–1)

Game	Date	Team	Score	High points	High rebounds	High assists	Location Attendance	Record
61	March 2	@ San Antonio	W 116–111	Malcolm Brogdon (26)	Domantas Sabonis (11)	Malcolm Brogdon (7)	AT&T Center; 17,635	37–24
62	March 4	@ Milwaukee	L 100–119	T. J. Warren (18)	Domantas Sabonis (10)	Domantas Sabonis (7)	Fiserv Forum; 17,695	37–25
63	March 6	@ Chicago	W 108–102	Domantas Sabonis (24)	Domantas Sabonis (12)	Edmond Sumner (5)	United Center; 20,229	38–25
64	March 8	@ Dallas	W 112–109	Domantas Sabonis (20)	Domantas Sabonis (17)	Victor Oladipo (7)	American Airlines Center; 20,324	39–25
65	March 10	Boston	L 111–114	Domantas Sabonis (28)	Domantas Sabonis (9)	Domantas Sabonis (8)	Bankers Life Fieldhouse; 17,053	39–26

Seeding games: 6–2 (home: 4–0; road: 2–2)

Game	Date	Team	Score	High points	High rebounds	High assists	Location Attendance	Record
66	August 1	Philadelphia	W 127–121	T. J. Warren (53)	Victor Oladipo (7)	Aaron Holiday (10)	Visa Athletic Center; No In-Person Attendance	40–26
67	August 3	@ Washington	W 111–100	T. J. Warren (34)	T. J. Warren (11)	Malcolm Brogdon (6)	Visa Athletic Center; No In-Person Attendance	41–26
68	August 4	Orlando	W 120–109	T. J. Warren (32)	Myles Turner (6)	Malcolm Brogdon (8)	Visa Athletic Center; No In-Person Attendance	42–26
69	August 6	@ Phoenix	L 99–114	Malcolm Brogdon (25)	T. J. Warren (11)	Malcolm Brogdon (6)	Visa Athletic Center; No In-Person Attendance	42–27
70	August 8	L. A. Lakers	W 116–111	T. J. Warren (39)	Oladipo, Sampson (7)	Aaron Holiday (7)	HP Field House; No In-Person Attendance	43–27
71	August 10	@ Miami	L 92–114	Victor Oladipo (14)	Malcolm Brogdon (8)	Malcolm Brogdon (6)	Visa Athletic Center; No In-Person Attendance	43–28
72	August 12	@ Houston	W 108–104	Holiday, Turner (18)	Myles Turner (12)	T. J. McConnell (7)	The Arena; No In-Person Attendance	44–28
73	August 14	Miami	W 109–92	Doug McDermott (23)	Alize Johnson (17)	T. J. Warren (8)	The Arena; No In-Person Attendance	45–28

Cancelled games

Game	Date	Team	Score	High points	High rebounds	High assists	Location Attendance	Record
66	March 14	@ Philadelphia					Wells Fargo Center	
67	March 18	Golden State					Bankers Life Fieldhouse	
68	March 20	Miami					Bankers Life Fieldhouse	
69	March 21	Cleveland					Bankers Life Fieldhouse	
70	March 23	Phoenix					Bankers Life Fieldhouse	
71	March 25	@ Orlando					Amway Center	
72	March 27	Houston					Bankers Life Fieldhouse	
73	March 29	@ Sacramento					Golden 1 Center	
74	March 30	@ LA Clippers					Staples Center	
75	April 1	@ LA Lakers					Staples Center	
76	April 3	Brooklyn					Bankers Life Fieldhouse	
77	April 5	Washington					Bankers Life Fieldhouse	
78	April 7	@ Miami					American Airlines Arena	
79	April 8	@ Boston					TD Garden	
80	April 11	Orlando					Bankers Life Fieldhouse	
81	April 13	San Antonio					Bankers Life Fieldhouse	
82	April 15	@ Washington					Capital One Arena	

2019–20 season schedule

=== Playoffs ===
2020 playoff game log
Total: 0–4 (home: 0–2; road: 0–2)
First Round: 0–4 (home: 0–2; road: 0–2)

Game	Date	Team	Score	High points	High rebounds	High assists	Location Attendance	Series
1	August 18	Miami	L 101–113	Warren, Brogdon (22)	Myles Turner (9)	Malcolm Brogdon (10)	AdventHealth Arena; No in-person attendance	0–1
2	August 20	Miami	L 100–109	Victor Oladipo (22)	Myles Turner (8)	Malcolm Brogdon (9)	The Field House; No in-person attendance	0–2
3	August 22	@ Miami	L 115–124	Malcolm Brogdon (34)	Myles Turner (12)	Malcolm Brogdon (14)	AdventHealth Arena; No in-person attendance	0–3
4	August 24	@ Miami	L 87–99	Victor Oladipo (25)	Myles Turner (14)	Malcolm Brogdon (7)	The Field House; No in-person attendance	0–4

2020 playoff schedule

== Player statistics ==
=== Regular season ===
Player	POS	GP	GS	MP	REB	AST	STL	BLK	PTS	MPG	RPG	APG	SPG	BPG	PPG
Justin Holiday	SF	73	6	1,826	238	93	87	46	603	25.0	3.3	1.3	1.2	.6	8.3
T. J. McConnell	PG	71	3	1,326	189	355	56	11	464	18.7	2.7	5.0	.8	.2	6.5
Doug McDermott	PF	69	0	1,372	174	78	12	5	710	19.9	2.5	1.1	.2	.1	10.3
T. J. Warren	SF	67	67	2,202	280	99	78	34	1,326	32.9	4.2	1.5	1.2	.5	19.8
Aaron Holiday	PG	66	33	1,617	156	225	55	16	627	24.5	2.4	3.4	.8	.2	9.5
Domantas Sabonis	PF	62	62	2,159	771	310	47	30	1,147	34.8	12.4	5.0	.8	.5	18.5
Myles Turner	C	62	62	1,826	407	72	46	132	749	29.5	6.6	1.2	.7	2.1	12.1
Malcolm Brogdon	PG	54	54	1,666	262	381	35	10	893	30.9	4.9	7.1	.6	.2	16.5
Goga Bitadze	C	54	2	471	106	23	10	37	172	8.7	2.0	.4	.2	.7	3.2
Jeremy Lamb	SG	46	42	1,291	200	96	55	22	577	28.1	4.3	2.1	1.2	.5	12.5
JaKarr Sampson	PF	34	12	471	88	21	16	12	156	13.9	2.6	.6	.5	.4	4.6
Edmond Sumner	SG	31	3	447	46	55	15	9	152	14.4	1.5	1.8	.5	.3	4.9
T. J. Leaf	PF	28	1	222	71	9	10	4	84	7.9	2.5	.3	.4	.1	3.0
Victor Oladipo	SG	19	16	528	75	56	17	4	275	27.8	3.9	2.9	.9	.2	14.5
Alize Johnson	PF	17	1	118	48	7	3	2	34	6.9	2.8	.4	.2	.1	2.0
Brian Bowen	SF	6	1	31	7	0	0	1	6	5.2	1.2	.0	.0	.2	1.0
Naz Mitrou-Long	SG	5	0	47	7	8	1	1	14	9.4	1.4	1.6	.2	.2	2.8

=== Playoffs ===
Player	POS	GP	GS	MP	REB	AST	STL	BLK	PTS	MPG	RPG	APG	SPG	BPG	PPG
Malcolm Brogdon	PG	4	4	160	17	40	4	0	86	40.0	4.3	10.0	1.0	.0	21.5
T. J. Warren	SF	4	4	156	25	12	9	1	80	39.0	6.3	3.0	2.3	.3	20.0
Myles Turner	C	4	4	146	43	3	2	16	63	36.5	10.8	.8	.5	4.0	15.8
Victor Oladipo	SG	4	4	123	13	10	9	0	71	30.8	3.3	2.5	2.3	.0	17.8
Justin Holiday	SF	4	2	131	15	3	6	5	29	32.8	3.8	.8	1.5	1.3	7.3
Aaron Holiday	PG	4	2	72	5	10	4	0	31	18.0	1.3	2.5	1.0	.0	7.8
Doug McDermott	PF	4	0	54	3	1	1	0	10	13.5	.8	.3	.3	.0	2.5
JaKarr Sampson	PF	4	0	50	13	4	2	0	20	12.5	3.3	1.0	.5	.0	5.0
Edmond Sumner	SG	3	0	41	6	0	0	0	6	13.7	2.0	.0	.0	.0	2.0
T. J. McConnell	PG	3	0	28	6	7	0	0	7	9.3	2.0	2.3	.0	.0	2.3
Alize Johnson	PF	1	0	0	0	0	0	0	0	.0	.0	.0	.0	.0	.0

== Transactions ==
=== Free agents ===
==== Re-signed ====
Player	Signed

==== Additions ====
Player	Signed	Former Team

==== Subtractions ====
Player	Reason	New Team
