= 2019–20 Chicago Bulls season =

Season of National Basketball Association team the Chicago Bulls

- Head coach: Jim Boylen
- President: Michael Reinsdorf
- General manager: Gar Forman
- Owners: Jerry Reinsdorf
- Arena: United Center

Results
- Record: 22–43 (.338)
- Place: Division: 3rd (Central); Conference: 11th (Eastern)
- Playoff finish: Did not qualify
- Stats at Basketball Reference

Local media
- Television: NBC Sports Chicago
- Radio: WLS; WSCR

The 2019–20 Chicago Bulls season was the 54th season of the franchise in the National Basketball Association (NBA).

The season was suspended by the league officials following the games of March 11 after it was reported that Rudy Gobert tested positive for COVID-19. On June 4, 2020, the season came to an end for the Bulls when the NBA Board of Governors approved a plan that would restart the season with 22 teams returning to play in the NBA Bubble on July 31, 2020, which was approved by the National Basketball Players Association the next day.

Boylen was later fired as head coach on August 14, 2020.

== Draft picks ==
Round	Pick	Player	Position	Nationality	College
1	7	Coby White	Point Guard	United States	North Carolina
2	38	Daniel Gafford	Power forward / Center	United States	Arkansas

The Bulls hold a lottery first round pick and a second round pick, which was acquired from the Memphis Grizzlies. They had traded away their original second-round pick to the Los Angeles Lakers in 2016. At the night of the draft lottery, the Bulls fell to #7, the furthest a team with the fourth-best odds had fallen in the NBA draft lottery. With the seventh pick of the draft, Chicago selected point guard Coby White from the University of North Carolina.

== Roster ==
2019–20 Chicago Bulls roster
Players

Pos.	No.	Player	Height	Weight	DOB	From
G	51	Ryan Arcidiacono	6 ft 3 in (1.91 m)	195 lb (88 kg)	1994-03-26	Villanova
C	34	Wendell Carter	6 ft 10 in (2.08 m)	270 lb (122 kg)	1999-04-16	Duke
G	32	Kris Dunn	6 ft 3 in (1.91 m)	205 lb (93 kg)	1994-03-18	Providence
C	6	Cristiano Felício	6 ft 11 in (2.11 m)	270 lb (122 kg)	1992-07-07	CCSE Prep Academy (CA)
C	12	Daniel Gafford	6 ft 11 in (2.11 m)	244 lb (111 kg)	1998-10-01	Arkansas
G	3	Shaquille Harrison	6 ft 7 in (2.01 m)	190 lb (86 kg)	1993-10-06	Tulsa
G/F	15	Chandler Hutchison	6 ft 7 in (2.01 m)	210 lb (95 kg)	1996-04-26	Boise State
C	2	Luke Kornet	7 ft 2 in (2.18 m)	250 lb (113 kg)	1995-07-15	Vanderbilt
G	8	Zach LaVine	6 ft 6 in (1.98 m)	200 lb (91 kg)	1995-03-10	UCLA
F	24	Lauri Markkanen	7 ft 0 in (2.13 m)	240 lb (109 kg)	1997-05-22	Arizona
G	20	Adam Mokoka (TW)	6 ft 5 in (1.96 m)	190 lb (86 kg)	1998-07-18	France
G/F	22	Otto Porter Jr.	6 ft 8 in (2.03 m)	198 lb (90 kg)	1993-06-03	Georgetown
G	31	Tomáš Satoranský	6 ft 7 in (2.01 m)	210 lb (95 kg)	1991-10-30	Czech Republic
G/F	28	Max Strus (TW)	6 ft 5 in (1.96 m)	215 lb (98 kg)	1996-03-28	DePaul
G	45	Denzel Valentine	6 ft 4 in (1.93 m)	220 lb (100 kg)	1993-11-16	Michigan State
G	0	Coby White	6 ft 4 in (1.93 m)	195 lb (88 kg)	2000-02-16	North Carolina
F	21	Thaddeus Young	6 ft 8 in (2.03 m)	235 lb (107 kg)	1988-06-21	Georgia Tech

Coaches
Head coach
- Jim Boylen
Assistant(s)
- Dean Cooper
- Chris Fleming
- Nate Loenser
- Roy Rogers
- Karen Stack Umlauf
- Shawn Respert (Player Development)
- Jeff Tanaka (trainer)

Legend
- (DP) Unsigned draft pick
- (FA) Free agent
- (S) Suspended
- (GL) On assignment to G League affiliate
- (TW) Two-way affiliate player
- Injured

Roster
Updated: March 2, 2020

== Standings ==
=== Division ===
Central Division	W	L	PCT	GB	Home	Road	Div	GP
z – Milwaukee Bucks	56	17	.767	–	30‍–‍5	26‍–‍12	13–1	73
x – Indiana Pacers	45	28	.616	11.0	25‍–‍11	20‍–‍17	8–7	73
Chicago Bulls	22	43	.338	30.0	14‍–‍20	8‍–‍23	7–9	65
Detroit Pistons	20	46	.303	32.5	11‍–‍22	9‍–‍24	5–10	66
Cleveland Cavaliers	19	46	.292	33.0	11‍–‍25	8‍–‍21	4–10	65

=== Conference ===
Eastern Conference
#	Team	W	L	PCT	GB	GP
1	z – Milwaukee Bucks *	56	17	.767	–	73
2	y – Toronto Raptors *	53	19	.736	2.5	72
3	x – Boston Celtics	48	24	.667	7.5	72
4	x – Indiana Pacers	45	28	.616	11.0	73
5	y – Miami Heat *	44	29	.603	12.0	73
6	x – Philadelphia 76ers	43	30	.589	13.0	73
7	x – Brooklyn Nets	35	37	.486	20.5	72
8	x – Orlando Magic	33	40	.452	23.0	73
9	Washington Wizards	25	47	.347	30.5	72
10	Charlotte Hornets	23	42	.354	29.0	65
11	Chicago Bulls	22	43	.338	30.0	65
12	New York Knicks	21	45	.318	31.5	66
13	Detroit Pistons	20	46	.303	32.5	66
14	Atlanta Hawks	20	47	.299	33.0	67
15	Cleveland Cavaliers	19	46	.292	33.0	65

== Game log ==
=== Preseason ===
The preseason schedule was announced on July 23, 2019.

2019 preseason game log
Total: 2–3 (Home: 1–2; Road: 1–1)
Preseason: 2–3 (home: 1–2; road: 1–1)

Game	Date	Team	Score	High points	High rebounds	High assists	Location Attendance	Record
1	October 7	Milwaukee	L 112–122	Zach LaVine (16)	Tomáš Satoranský (7)	Zach LaVine (10)	United Center; 17,036	0–1
2	October 9	New Orleans	L 125–127	Zach LaVine (28)	Otto Porter (7)	Satoranský, Porter (8)	United Center; 18,670	0–2
3	October 11	@ Indiana	L 87–105	Coby White (24)	Coby White (8)	Ryan Arcidiacono (4)	Bankers Life Fieldhouse; 10,821	0–3
4	October 13	@ Toronto	W 105–91	Zach LaVine (26)	Lauri Markkanen (13)	LaVine, Satoranský, Arcidiacono, Dunn (4)	Scotiabank Arena; 16,438	1–3
5	October 17	Atlanta	W 111–93	Zach LaVine (23)	Lauri Markkanen (11)	Satoranský, Arcidiacono (4)	United Center; 18,277	2–3

2019–20 season schedule

=== Regular season ===
2019–20 game log
Total: 22–43 (Home: 14–20; Road: 8–23)
October: 1–4 (home: 0–1; road: 1–3)

Game	Date	Team	Score	High points	High rebounds	High assists	Location Attendance	Record
1	October 23	@ Charlotte	L 125–126	Lauri Markkanen (35)	Lauri Markkanen (17)	Zach LaVine (7)	Spectrum Center; 15,424	0–1
2	October 25	@ Memphis	W 110–102	Zach LaVine (37)	Lauri Markkanen (11)	LaVine, Dunn (4)	FedExForum; 17,794	1–1
3	October 26	Toronto	L 84–108	Wendell Carter Jr. (12)	Wendell Carter Jr. (11)	LaVine, Satoransky, Arcidiacono (4)	United Center; 21,498	1–2
4	October 28	@ New York	L 98–105	Zach LaVine (21)	Wendell Carter Jr. (10)	Tomas Satoransky (5)	Madison Square Garden; 21,498	1–3
5	October 30	@ Cleveland	L 111–117	LaVine, Markkanen (16)	Lauri Markkanen (8)	Tomas Satoransky (8)	Rocket Mortgage FieldHouse; 17,595	1–4

November : 5–10 (home: 3–6; road: 2–4)

Game	Date	Team	Score	High points	High rebounds	High assists	Location Attendance	Record
6	November 1	Detroit	W 112–106	Zach LaVine (26)	Wendell Carter Jr. (11)	Tomas Satoransky (6)	United Center; 20,671	2–4
7	November 3	@ Indiana	L 95–108	Zach LaVine (21)	Wendell Carter Jr. (10)	Tomas Satoransky (9)	Bankers Life Fieldhouse; 17,073	2–5
8	November 5	L. A. Lakers	L 112–118	Zach LaVine (26)	Wendell Carter Jr. (11)	Zach LaVine (7)	United Center; 21,193	2–6
9	November 6	@ Atlanta	W 113–93	Tomas Satoransky (27)	Zach LaVine (8)	Tomas Satoransky (8)	State Farm Arena; 15,049	3–6
10	November 9	Houston	L 94–117	Young, Hutchison, Markkanen, Carter Jr. (13)	Wendell Carter Jr. (16)	Zach LaVine (5)	United Center; 20,482	3–7
11	November 12	New York	W 120–102	Coby White (27)	Wendell Carter Jr. (12)	Ryan Arcidiacono (8)	United Center; 18,668	4–7
12	November 14	@ Milwaukee	L 115–124	Coby White (26)	Lauri Markkanen (8)	Zach LaVine (7)	Fiserv Forum; 17,627	4–8
13	November 16	Brooklyn	L 111–117	Zach LaVine (36)	Wendell Carter Jr. (14)	Coby White (3)	United Center; 19,148	4–9
14	November 18	Milwaukee	L 101–115	Daniel Gafford (21)	Carter Jr., LaVine, Markkanen (8)	Kris Dunn (9)	United Center; 17,565	4–10
15	November 20	Detroit	W 109–89	Lauri Markkanen (24)	Wendell Carter Jr. (15)	Tomas Satoransky (7)	United Center; 18,119	5–10
16	November 22	Miami	L 108–116	Zach LaVine (15)	Thaddeus Young (8)	Satoransky, Dunn (5)	United Center; 18,953	5–11
17	November 23	@ Charlotte	W 116–115	Zach LaVine (49)	Wendell Carter Jr. (11)	Tomas Satoransky (8)	Spectrum Center; 17,891	6–11
18	November 25	Portland	L 94–117	Zach LaVine (18)	Wendell Carter Jr. (9)	Satoransky, LaVine (5)	United Center; 18,776	6–12
19	November 27	@ Golden State	L 90–104	Zach LaVine (36)	Wendell Carter Jr. (9)	Tomáš Satoranský (7)	Chase Center; 18,064	6–13
20	November 29	@ Portland	L 103–107	Zach LaVine (28)	Young, Carter Jr. (9)	Tomáš Satoranský (8)	Moda Center; 20,139	6–14

December : 7–7 (home: 4–4; road: 3–3)

Game	Date	Team	Score	High points	High rebounds	High assists	Location Attendance	Record
21	December 2	@ Sacramento	W 113–106	Zach LaVine (28)	Wendell Carter Jr. (10)	Tomáš Satoranský (5)	Golden 1 Center; 17,257	7–14
22	December 4	Memphis	W 106–99	Zach LaVine (25)	Wendell Carter Jr. (13)	Tomáš Satoranský (8)	United Center; 15,017	8–14
23	December 6	Golden State	L 98–100	Zach LaVine (22)	Wendell Carter Jr. (12)	Zach LaVine (6)	United Center; 18,841	8–15
24	December 8	@ Miami	L 105–110 (OT)	Lauri Markkanen (22)	Wendell Carter Jr. (10)	Coby White (8)	American Airlines Arena; 19,600	8–16
25	December 9	Toronto	L 92–93	Zach LaVine (20)	Zach LaVine (11)	Tomáš Satoranský (11)	United Center; 14,775	8–17
26	December 11	Atlanta	W 136–102	Zach LaVine (35)	Wendell Carter Jr. (10)	Thaddeus Young (6)	United Center; 15,084	9–17
27	December 13	Charlotte	L 73–83	Arcidiacono, LaVine (12)	Wendell Carter Jr. (11)	Satoransky, Dunn, White (3)	United Center; 18,377	9–18
28	December 14	L. A. Clippers	W 109–106	Zach LaVine (31)	Lauri Markkanen (17)	Tomáš Satoranský (5)	United Center; 18,426	10–18
29	December 16	@ Oklahoma City	L 106–109	Zach LaVine (39)	Wendell Carter Jr. (9)	Tomáš Satoranský (6)	Chesapeake Energy Arena; 18,203	10–19
30	December 18	@ Washington	W 110–109 (OT)	Lauri Markkanen (31)	Markkanen, Carter Jr., Young (9)	Tomáš Satoranský (6)	Capital One Arena; 14,987	11–19
31	December 21	@ Detroit	W 119–107	Zach LaVine (33)	Wendell Carter Jr. (12)	Satoransky, LaVine (5)	Little Caesars Arena; 15,948	12–19
32	December 23	@ Orlando	L 95–103	Zach LaVine (26)	Wendell Carter Jr. (10)	Kris Dunn (6)	Amway Center; 18,846	12–20
33	December 28	Atlanta	W 116–81	Lauri Markkanen (25)	Carter Jr., Satoransky (8)	Tomáš Satoranský (6)	United Center; 21,496	13–20
34	December 30	Milwaukee	L 102–123	Zach LaVine (19)	Wendell Carter Jr. (11)	Tomáš Satoranský (7)	United Center; 21,954	13–21

January : 6–11 (home: 4–4; road: 2–7)

Game	Date	Team	Score	High points	High rebounds	High assists	Location Attendance	Record
35	January 2	Utah	L 98–102	Zach LaVine (26)	Wendell Carter Jr. (13)	Zach LaVine (5)	United Center; 19,398	13–22
36	January 4	Boston	L 104–111	Zach LaVine (35)	Wendell Carter Jr. (14)	Kris Dunn (7)	United Center; 21,130	13–23
37	January 6	@ Dallas	L 110–118	Lauri Markkanen (26)	Markkanen, Young (9)	Tomáš Satoranský (14)	American Airlines Center; 20,238	13–24
38	January 8	@ New Orleans	L 108–123	Zach LaVine (32)	White, Young (6)	Kris Dunn (7)	Smoothie King Center; 15,324	13–25
39	January 10	Indiana	L 105–116	Zach LaVine (43)	Thaddeus Young (9)	Lauri Markkanen (4)	United Center; 20,229	13–26
40	January 11	@ Detroit	W 108–99	Zach LaVine (25)	Markkanen, Gafford (7)	Zach LaVine (6)	Little Caesars Arena; 15,951	14–26
41	January 13	@ Boston	L 101–113	Zach LaVine (30)	Lauri Markkanen (6)	Tomáš Satoranský (7)	TD Garden; 19,156	14–27
42	January 15	Washington	W 115–106	Zach LaVine (30)	Markkanen, Young (8)	Dunn, LaVine (7)	United Center; 19,382	15–27
43	January 17	@ Philadelphia	L 89–100	Zach LaVine (23)	Zach LaVine (7)	Tomáš Satoranský (6)	Wells Fargo Center; 20,919	15–28
44	January 18	Cleveland	W 118–116	Zach LaVine (42)	Zach LaVine (6)	Tomáš Satoranský (8)	United Center; 19,939	16–28
45	January 20	@ Milwaukee	L 98–111	Zach LaVine (24)	Lauri Markkanen (8)	Tomáš Satoranský (4)	Fiserv Forum; 17,747	16–29
46	January 22	Minnesota	W 117–110	Zach LaVine (25)	Cristiano Felício (10)	Tomáš Satoranský (5)	United Center; 18,875	17–29
47	January 24	Sacramento	L 81–98	Zach LaVine (21)	Cristiano Felício (9)	Kris Dunn (6)	United Center; 17,661	17–30
48	January 25	@ Cleveland	W 118–106	Zach LaVine (44)	Zach LaVine (10)	Zach LaVine (8)	Rocket Mortgage FieldHouse; 19,432	18–30
49	January 27	San Antonio	W 110–109	Zach LaVine (23)	Kornet, Young (9)	Kris Dunn (8)	United Center; 16,071	19–30
50	January 29	@ Indiana	L 106–115 (OT)	Chandler Hutchison (21)	Cristiano Felício (8)	Zach LaVine (9)	Bankers Life Fieldhouse; 17,923	19–31
51	January 31	@ Brooklyn	L 118–133	Zach LaVine (22)	Chandler Hutchison (9)	LaVine, Satoranský (8)	Barclays Center; 17,732	19–32

February : 1–8 (home: 1–4; road: 0–4)

Game	Date	Team	Score	High points	High rebounds	High assists	Location Attendance	Record
52	February 2	@ Toronto	L 102–129	Thaddeus Young (21)	LaVine, Young (7)	Zach LaVine (7)	Scotiabank Arena; 19,800	19–33
53	February 6	New Orleans	L 119–125	Zach LaVine (22)	Chandler Hutchison (8)	Coby White (9)	United Center; 18,247	19–34
54	February 9	@ Philadelphia	L 111–118	Zach LaVine (32)	Thaddeus Young (10)	Zach LaVine (8)	Wells Fargo Center; 21,018	19–35
55	February 11	@ Washington	L 114–126	Zach LaVine (41)	Zach LaVine (9)	Tomáš Satoranský (8)	Capital One Arena; 15,135	19–36
56	February 20	Charlotte	L 93–103	Thaddeus Young (22)	Thaddeus Young (11)	Tomáš Satoranský (8)	United Center; 17,463	19–37
57	February 22	Phoenix	L 104–112	Coby White (33)	Felício, Satoranský (6)	Zach LaVine (5)	United Center; 20,506	19–38
58	February 23	Washington	W 126–117	Coby White (33)	Felício, White, Young (6)	Tomáš Satoranský (13)	United Center; 18,024	20–38
59	February 25	Oklahoma City	L 122–124	Zach LaVine (41)	Cristiano Felício (9)	Tomáš Satoranský (7)	United Center; 16,911	20–39
60	February 29	@ New York	L 115–125	Zach LaVine (26)	Wendell Carter Jr. (9)	LaVine, Satoranský (7)	Madison Square Garden; 19,812	20–40

March: 2–3 (home: 2–1; road: 0–2)

Game	Date	Team	Score	High points	High rebounds	High assists	Location Attendance	Record
61	March 2	Dallas	W 109–107	Coby White (19)	Thaddeus Young (9)	Satoranský, White (5)	United Center; 18,407	21–40
62	March 4	@ Minnesota	L 108–115	Coby White (26)	Wendell Carter Jr. (9)	Coby White (6)	Target Center; 13,392	21–41
63	March 6	Indiana	L 102–108	Coby White (26)	Satoranský, Young (7)	Tomáš Satoranský (8)	United Center; 20,229	21–42
64	March 8	@ Brooklyn	L 107–110	Otto Porter (23)	Shaquille Harrison (8)	Coby White (8)	Barclays Center; 15,916	21–43
65	March 10	Cleveland	W 108–103	Coby White (20)	Shaquille Harrison (10)	Satoranský, White (5)	United Center; 17,837	22–43

Cancelled games

Game	Date	Team	Score	High points	High rebounds	High assists	Location Attendance	Record
66	March 12	@ Orlando					Amway Center	
67	March 14	@ Miami					American Airlines Arena	
68	March 15	Boston					United Center	
69	March 18	Miami					United Center	
70	March 20	@ San Antonio					AT&T Center	
71	March 21	@ Houston					Toyota Center	
72	March 23	Denver					United Center	
73	March 26	Philadelphia					United Center	
74	March 28	New York					United Center	
75	March 30	@ Utah					Vivint Smart Home Arena	
76	April 3	@ Denver					Pepsi Center	
77	April 5	@ Phoenix					Talking Stick Resort Arena	
78	April 6	@ LA Clippers					Staples Center	
79	April 8	@ LA Lakers					Staples Center	
80	April 11	Brooklyn					United Center	
81	April 13	Orlando					United Center	
82	April 15	@ Boston					TD Garden	

2019–20 season schedule

== Player statistics ==
Player	Pos.	GP	GS	MP	Reb.	Ast.	Stl.	Blk.	Pts.
Ryan Arcidiacono	PG	58	4	930	110	96	27	3	261
Wendell Carter	C	43	43	1,256	405	51	33	36	484
Kris Dunn	PG	51	32	1,269	186	173	101	17	373
Cristiano Felício	C	22	0	386	102	16	10	2	86
Daniel Gafford	C	43	7	609	106	21	13	56	220
Shaquille Harrison	PG	43	10	484	86	49	34	19	209
Chandler Hutchison	SF	28	10	527	108	26	27	7	218
Luke Kornet	PF/C	36	14	559	84	32	11	26	215
Zach LaVine	SG	60	60	2,085	289	254	88	28	1,530
Lauri Markkanen	PF	50	50	1,492	313	74	42	23	737
Adam Mokoka	SG/SF	11	0	112	10	4	4	0	32
Otto Porter	SF	14	9	331	48	25	15	6	167
Tomáš Satoranský	PG	65	64	1,878	254	354	80	7	644
Max Strus	SF	2	0	6	1	0	0	0	5
Denzel Valentine	SG/SF	36	5	488	74	43	26	6	246
Coby White	PG	65	1	1,674	230	175	49	6	859
Thaddeus Young	PF	64	16	1,591	315	117	92	23	659

After all games.
^{‡}Waived during the season
^{†}Traded during the season
^{≠}Acquired during the season
