= 2019–20 Milwaukee Bucks season =

NBA professional basketball team season

- Division champions
- Head coach: Mike Budenholzer
- General manager: Jon Horst
- Owners: Wesley Edens; Marc Lasry
- Arena: Fiserv Forum

Results
- Record: 56–17 (.767)
- Place: Division: 1st (Central); Conference: 1st (Eastern)
- Playoff finish: Conference semifinals (lost to Heat 1–4)
- Stats at Basketball Reference

Local media
- Television: Fox Sports Wisconsin
- Radio: WTMJ

The 2019–20 Milwaukee Bucks season was the 52nd season of the franchise in the National Basketball Association (NBA). The Bucks entered the season following a playoff defeat in six games from the Toronto Raptors in the Eastern Conference finals. The Bucks had the best team defensive rating in the NBA.

On February 23, 2020, the Bucks became the first team to clinch a playoff berth after the Chicago Bulls defeated the Washington Wizards. The season was suspended by the league officials following the games of March 11 after it was reported that Rudy Gobert tested positive for COVID-19. The Bucks returned to play on July 31 against the Boston Celtics at the ESPN Wide World of Sports Complex in Orlando, Florida.

The Bucks were 53–9 (.855) early in March before losing three straight games before the season was suspended on March 11 due to the COVID-19 pandemic. When the format of the 2020 NBA Bubble announced, Bucks won the Central Division on June 4 and tied Detroit Pistons' record of 9 Central Division titles. After a 23-point comeback win over the Miami Heat, the Bucks clinched the top seed in the Eastern Conference for the second consecutive season as well as the best NBA record overall for the shortened season at 56–17, or roughly 63–19 in a full season. The Bucks faced the Orlando Magic in the First Round. In a significant development following the shooting of Jacob Blake in Kenosha, Wisconsin, the Bucks led a strike in solidarity with the Black Lives Matter movement, refusing to play Game 5 of their series against the Magic on August 26. On September 8, the Milwaukee Bucks season came to an end when the 5th seeded Miami Heat eliminated them in a five-game upset in the conference semifinals. This season was also Kyle Korver's last in the NBA as he spent the entire 2020–21 season as a free agent and subsequently retired on August 12, 2021, for family reasons. The 51st pick in the 2003 draft, Korver's retirement left LeBron James, Carmelo Anthony, and Udonis Haslem as the only remaining active players from the early 2000s. Giannis Antetokounmpo also won his second MVP award this season, having won his first the previous year.

== Draft picks ==
Round	Pick	Player	Position(s)	Nationality	School
1	30	Kevin Porter Jr.	Shooting Guard	United States	USC

The Bucks only held a first-round pick. That pick would then be traded to the Detroit Pistons, which would again be transferred to the Cleveland Cavaliers.

== Roster ==
2019–20 Milwaukee Bucks roster
Players

Pos.	No.	Player	Height	Weight	DOB	From
F	34	Giannis Antetokounmpo (C)	7 ft 0 in (2.13 m)	242 lb (110 kg)	1994–12–06	Greece
G/F	43	Thanasis Antetokounmpo	6 ft 7 in (2.01 m)	219 lb (99 kg)	1992–07–18	Greece
G	6	Eric Bledsoe	6 ft 1 in (1.85 m)	214 lb (97 kg)	1989–12–09	Kentucky
G/F	23	Sterling Brown	6 ft 5 in (1.96 m)	219 lb (99 kg)	1995–02–10	SMU
G	24	Pat Connaughton	6 ft 5 in (1.96 m)	209 lb (95 kg)	1993–01–06	Notre Dame
G	0	Donte DiVincenzo	6 ft 4 in (1.93 m)	203 lb (92 kg)	1997–01–31	Villanova
G	3	George Hill	6 ft 3 in (1.91 m)	188 lb (85 kg)	1986–05–04	IUPUI
F	7	Ersan İlyasova	6 ft 10 in (2.08 m)	235 lb (107 kg)	1987–05–15	Turkey
G/F	26	Kyle Korver	6 ft 7 in (2.01 m)	212 lb (96 kg)	1981–03–17	Creighton
C	11	Brook Lopez	7 ft 1 in (2.16 m)	282 lb (128 kg)	1988–04–01	Stanford
C	42	Robin Lopez	7 ft 1 in (2.16 m)	281 lb (127 kg)	1988–04–01	Stanford
G	15	Frank Mason (TW)	5 ft 11 in (1.80 m)	190 lb (86 kg)	1994–04–03	Kansas
G	9	Wesley Matthews	6 ft 4 in (1.93 m)	220 lb (100 kg)	1986–10–14	Marquette
F	22	Khris Middleton (C)	6 ft 8 in (2.03 m)	222 lb (101 kg)	1991–08–12	Texas A&M
G/F	13	Cameron Reynolds (TW)	6 ft 7 in (2.01 m)	225 lb (102 kg)	1995–02–07	Tulane
F	20	Marvin Williams	6 ft 9 in (2.06 m)	237 lb (108 kg)	1986–06–19	North Carolina

Coaches
Head coach
- Mike Budenholzer
Assistant(s)
- Vin Baker
- Chad Forcier
- Darvin Ham
- Charles Lee
- Josh Longstaff
- Patrick St. Andrews
- Ben Sullivan

Legend
- (DP) Unsigned draft pick
- (FA) Free agent
- (S) Suspended
- (GL) On assignment to G League affiliate
- (TW) Two-way affiliate player
- Injured

Roster
Updated: 2020–02–10

== Standings ==
=== Division ===
Central Division	W	L	PCT	GB	Home	Road	Div	GP
z – Milwaukee Bucks	56	17	.767	–	30‍–‍5	26‍–‍12	13–1	73
x – Indiana Pacers	45	28	.616	11.0	25‍–‍11	20‍–‍17	8–7	73
Chicago Bulls	22	43	.338	30.0	14‍–‍20	8‍–‍23	7–9	65
Detroit Pistons	20	46	.303	32.5	11‍–‍22	9‍–‍24	5–10	66
Cleveland Cavaliers	19	46	.292	33.0	11‍–‍25	8‍–‍21	4–10	65

=== Conference ===
Eastern Conference
#	Team	W	L	PCT	GB	GP
1	z – Milwaukee Bucks *	56	17	.767	–	73
2	y – Toronto Raptors *	53	19	.736	2.5	72
3	x – Boston Celtics	48	24	.667	7.5	72
4	x – Indiana Pacers	45	28	.616	11.0	73
5	y – Miami Heat *	44	29	.603	12.0	73
6	x – Philadelphia 76ers	43	30	.589	13.0	73
7	x – Brooklyn Nets	35	37	.486	20.5	72
8	x – Orlando Magic	33	40	.452	23.0	73
9	Washington Wizards	25	47	.347	30.5	72
10	Charlotte Hornets	23	42	.354	29.0	65
11	Chicago Bulls	22	43	.338	30.0	65
12	New York Knicks	21	45	.318	31.5	66
13	Detroit Pistons	20	46	.303	32.5	66
14	Atlanta Hawks	20	47	.299	33.0	67
15	Cleveland Cavaliers	19	46	.292	33.0	65

== Game log ==
=== Preseason ===
The preseason schedule was announced on July 23, 2019.

2019 preseason game log
Total: 5–0 (home: 2–0; road: 3–0)
Preseason: 5–0 (home: 2–0; road: 3–0)

Game	Date	Team	Score	High points	High rebounds	High assists	Location Attendance	Record
1	October 7	@ Chicago	W 122–112	Mason III, Lopez (14)	Thanasis Antetokounmpo (10)	Frank Mason (6)	United Center; 17,036	1–0
2	October 9	Utah	W 133–99	Giannis Antetokounmpo (22)	Giannis Antetokounmpo (11)	Frank Mason (6)	Fiserv Forum; 13,915	2–0
3	October 11	@ Dallas	W 118–111	Giannis Antetokounmpo (34)	Giannis Antetokounmpo (11)	Antetokounmpo, Middleton, Hill (4)	American Airlines Center; 17,082	3–0
4	October 13	@ Washington	W 115–108	Khris Middleton (22)	Khris Middleton (9)	Middleton, Mason III, Matthews (4)	Capital One Arena; 10,216	4–0
5	October 17	Minnesota	W 118–96	Giannis Antetokounmpo (26)	Giannis Antetokounmpo (14)	Khris Middleton (7)	Fiserv Forum; 16,148	5–0

2019–20 season schedule

=== Regular season ===
2019–20 game log
Total: 56–17 (home: 30–5; road: 26–12)
October: 2–2 (home: 1–1; road: 1–1)

Game	Date	Team	Score	High points	High rebounds	High assists	Location Attendance	Record
1	October 24	@ Houston	W 117–111	Giannis Antetokounmpo (30)	Giannis Antetokounmpo (13)	Giannis Antetokounmpo (11)	Toyota Center; 18,055	1–0
2	October 26	Miami	L 126–131 (OT)	Giannis Antetokounmpo (29)	Giannis Antetokounmpo (17)	Giannis Antetokounmpo (9)	Fiserv Forum; 17,467	1–1
3	October 28	Cleveland	W 129–112	Khris Middleton (21)	Giannis Antetokounmpo (10)	Eric Bledsoe (8)	Fiserv Forum; 17,385	2–1
4	October 30	@ Boston	L 105–116	Khris Middleton (26)	Giannis Antetokounmpo (14)	Antetokounmpo, Bledsoe (5)	TD Garden; 18,624	2–2

November : 15–1 (home: 7–0; road: 8–1)

Game	Date	Team	Score	High points	High rebounds	High assists	Location Attendance	Record
5	November 1	@ Orlando	W 123–91	Giannis Antetokounmpo (29)	Giannis Antetokounmpo (14)	Antetokounmpo, Bledsoe (6)	Amway Center; 15,105	3–2
6	November 2	Toronto	W 115–105	Giannis Antetokounmpo (36)	Giannis Antetokounmpo (15)	Giannis Antetokounmpo (8)	Fiserv Forum; 17,637	4–2
7	November 4	@ Minnesota	W 134–106	Giannis Antetokounmpo (34)	Giannis Antetokounmpo (15)	Antetokounmpo, Bledsoe (6)	Target Center; 16,271	5–2
8	November 6	@ L. A. Clippers	W 129–124	Giannis Antetokounmpo (38)	Giannis Antetokounmpo (16)	Giannis Antetokounmpo (9)	Staples Center; 19,068	6–2
9	November 8	@ Utah	L 100–103	Giannis Antetokounmpo (30)	Giannis Antetokounmpo (13)	Eric Bledsoe (5)	Vivint Smart Home Arena; 18,306	6–3
10	November 10	@ Oklahoma City	W 121–119	Giannis Antetokounmpo (35)	Giannis Antetokounmpo (16)	Eric Bledsoe (9)	Chesapeake Energy Arena; 18,203	7–3
11	November 14	Chicago	W 124–115	Giannis Antetokounmpo (38)	Giannis Antetokounmpo (16)	Eric Bledsoe (8)	Fiserv Forum; 17,627	8–3
12	November 16	@ Indiana	W 102–83	Giannis Antetokounmpo (26)	Giannis Antetokounmpo (13)	Giannis Antetokounmpo (6)	Bankers Life Fieldhouse; 17,024	9–3
13	November 18	@ Chicago	W 115–101	Giannis Antetokounmpo (33)	Lopez, Antetokounmpo (10)	Sterling Brown (6)	United Center; 17,565	10–3
14	November 20	@ Atlanta	W 135–127	Giannis Antetokounmpo (33)	Giannis Antetokounmpo (11)	Eric Bledsoe (5)	State Farm Arena; 16,441	11–3
15	November 21	Portland	W 137–129	Eric Bledsoe (30)	Giannis Antetokounmpo (19)	Giannis Antetokounmpo (15)	Fiserv Forum; 17,385	12–3
16	November 23	Detroit	W 104–90	Giannis Antetokounmpo (28)	Antetokounmpo, Brown (10)	Eric Bledsoe (5)	Fiserv Forum; 17,585	13–3
17	November 25	Utah	W 122–118	Giannis Antetokounmpo (50)	Giannis Antetokounmpo (14)	Giannis Antetokounmpo (6)	Fiserv Forum; 17,385	14–3
18	November 27	Atlanta	W 111–102	Giannis Antetokounmpo (30)	Giannis Antetokounmpo (10)	Eric Bledsoe (10)	Fiserv Forum; 17,525	15–3
19	November 29	@ Cleveland	W 119–110	Giannis Antetokounmpo (33)	Giannis Antetokounmpo (12)	Middleton, Bledsoe (5)	Rocket Mortgage FieldHouse; 19,432	16–3
20	November 30	Charlotte	W 137–96	Giannis Antetokounmpo (26)	Pat Connaughton (10)	Eric Bledsoe (10)	Fiserv Forum; 17,550	17–3

December : 13–2 (home: 8–1; road: 5–1)

Game	Date	Team	Score	High points	High rebounds	High assists	Location Attendance	Record
21	December 2	New York	W 132–88	Giannis Antetokounmpo (29)	Giannis Antetokounmpo (15)	Kyle Korver (5)	Fiserv Forum; 17,385	18–3
22	December 4	@ Detroit	W 127–103	Giannis Antetokounmpo (35)	Giannis Antetokounmpo (9)	Eric Bledsoe (6)	Little Caesars Arena; 15,742	19–3
23	December 6	L. A. Clippers	W 119–91	Giannis Antetokounmpo (27)	Giannis Antetokounmpo (11)	Middleton, Bledsoe (5)	Fiserv Forum; 17,732	20–3
24	December 9	Orlando	W 110–101	Giannis Antetokounmpo (32)	Giannis Antetokounmpo (15)	Antetokounmpo, Bledsoe (8)	Fiserv Forum; 17,385	21–3
25	December 11	New Orleans	W 127–112	Eric Bledsoe (29)	Ersan İlyasova (9)	Eric Bledsoe (6)	Fiserv Forum; 17,385	22–3
26	December 13	@ Memphis	W 127–114	Giannis Antetokounmpo (37)	Giannis Antetokounmpo (11)	George Hill (5)	FedExForum; 16,109	23–3
27	December 14	Cleveland	W 125–108	Giannis Antetokounmpo (29)	Robin Lopez (6)	Khris Middleton (6)	Fiserv Forum; 17,481	24–3
28	December 16	Dallas	L 116–120	Giannis Antetokounmpo (48)	Giannis Antetokounmpo (14)	Donte DiVincenzo (9)	Fiserv Forum; 17,727	24–4
29	December 19	L. A. Lakers	W 111–104	Giannis Antetokounmpo (34)	Giannis Antetokounmpo (11)	Giannis Antetokounmpo (7)	Fiserv Forum; 18,051	25–4
30	December 21	@ New York	W 123–102	Khris Middleton (23)	Giannis Antetokounmpo (11)	Giannis Antetokounmpo (10)	Madison Square Garden; 18,129	26–4
31	December 22	Indiana	W 117–89	Wesley Matthews (19)	Giannis Antetokounmpo (19)	Giannis Antetokounmpo (9)	Fiserv Forum; 18,029	27–4
32	December 25	@ Philadelphia	L 109–121	Khris Middleton (31)	Giannis Antetokounmpo (14)	Giannis Antetokounmpo (7)	Wells Fargo Center; 21,028	27–5
33	December 27	@ Atlanta	W 112–86	Khris Middleton (23)	Ersan İlyasova (17)	Khris Middleton (7)	State Farm Arena; 17,358	28–5
34	December 28	Orlando	W 111–100	Khris Middleton (21)	Ersan İlyasova (14)	Khris Middleton (7)	Fiserv Forum; 17,920	29–5
35	December 30	@ Chicago	W 123–102	Khris Middleton (25)	Ersan İlyasova (11)	Giannis Antetokounmpo (6)	United Center; 21,954	30–5

January : 11–2 (home: 6–1; road: 5–1)

Game	Date	Team	Score	High points	High rebounds	High assists	Location Attendance	Record
36	January 1	Minnesota	W 106–104	Giannis Antetokounmpo (32)	Giannis Antetokounmpo (17)	Antetokounmpo, Middleton (4)	Fiserv Forum; 17,819	31–5
37	January 4	San Antonio	W 127–118	Giannis Antetokounmpo (32)	Giannis Antetokounmpo (8)	Korver, Bledsoe (6)	Fiserv Forum; 18,002	32–5
38	January 6	@ San Antonio	L 104–126	Giannis Antetokounmpo (24)	Giannis Antetokounmpo (12)	Giannis Antetokounmpo (8)	AT&T Center; 18,354	32–6
39	January 8	@ Golden State	W 107–98	Giannis Antetokounmpo (30)	Giannis Antetokounmpo (12)	Khris Middleton (6)	Chase Center; 18,064	33–6
40	January 10	@ Sacramento	W 127–106	Khris Middleton (27)	Sterling Brown (12)	George Hill (6)	Golden 1 Center; 17,583	34–6
41	January 11	@ Portland	W 122–101	Giannis Antetokounmpo (32)	Giannis Antetokounmpo (17)	Giannis Antetokounmpo (6)	Moda Center; 19,843	35–6
42	January 14	New York	W 128–102	Giannis Antetokounmpo (37)	Giannis Antetokounmpo (9)	Antetokounmpo, DiVincenzo (4)	Fiserv Forum; 17,590	36–6
43	January 16	Boston	W 128–123	Giannis Antetokounmpo (32)	Giannis Antetokounmpo (17)	Giannis Antetokounmpo (7)	Fiserv Forum; 17,873	37–6
44	January 18	@ Brooklyn	W 117–97	Giannis Antetokounmpo (29)	Giannis Antetokounmpo (12)	Eric Bledsoe (5)	Barclays Center; 17,732	38–6
45	January 20	Chicago	W 111–98	Giannis Antetokounmpo (28)	Giannis Antetokounmpo (14)	Giannis Antetokounmpo (10)	Fiserv Forum; 17,747	39–6
46	January 24	@ Charlotte	W 116–103	Giannis Antetokounmpo (30)	Giannis Antetokounmpo (16)	Giannis Antetokounmpo (6)	(France) AccorHotels Arena (Paris); 15,758	40–6
47	January 28	Washington	W 151–131	Khris Middleton (51)	Khris Middleton (10)	Eric Bledsoe (10)	Fiserv Forum; 17,681	41–6
48	January 31	Denver	L 115–127	Giannis Antetokounmpo (31)	Giannis Antetokounmpo (16)	Antetokounmpo, Middleton (9)	Fiserv Forum; 18,141	41–7

February : 10–1 (home: 5–0; road: 5–1)

Game	Date	Team	Score	High points	High rebounds	High assists	Location Attendance	Record
49	February 2	Phoenix	W 129–108	Giannis Antetokounmpo (30)	Giannis Antetokounmpo (19)	Giannis Antetokounmpo (9)	Fiserv Forum; 17,754	42–7
50	February 4	@ New Orleans	W 120–108	Giannis Antetokounmpo (34)	Giannis Antetokounmpo (17)	Khris Middleton (8)	Smoothie King Center; 15,424	43–7
51	February 6	Philadelphia	W 112–101	Giannis Antetokounmpo (36)	Giannis Antetokounmpo (20)	Antetokounmpo, Bledsoe (6)	Fiserv Forum; 17,928	44–7
52	February 8	@ Orlando	W 111–95	Brook Lopez (23)	Giannis Antetokounmpo (18)	Giannis Antetokounmpo (9)	Amway Center; 16,632	45–7
53	February 10	Sacramento	W 123–111	Bledsoe, Middleton (28)	Khris Middleton (11)	Bledsoe, Middleton (8)	Fiserv Forum; 17,463	46–7
54	February 12	@ Indiana	L 111–118	Donte DiVincenzo (19)	Brown, DiVincenzo (8)	Khris Middleton (5)	Bankers Life Fieldhouse; 17,018	46–8
55	February 20	@ Detroit	W 126–106	Giannis Antetokounmpo (33)	Giannis Antetokounmpo (16)	Eric Bledsoe (6)	Little Caesars Arena; 16,097	47–8
56	February 22	Philadelphia	W 119–98	Giannis Antetokounmpo (31)	Giannis Antetokounmpo (17)	Antetokounmpo, Bledsoe (8)	Fiserv Forum; 18,290	48–8
57	February 24	@ Washington	W 137–134 (OT)	Khris Middleton (40)	Giannis Antetokounmpo (14)	Eric Bledsoe (10)	Capital One Arena; 16,580	49–8
58	February 25	@ Toronto	W 108–97	Khris Middleton (22)	Giannis Antetokounmpo (19)	Giannis Antetokounmpo (8)	Scotiabank Arena; 19,993	50–8
59	February 28	Oklahoma City	W 133–86	Giannis Antetokounmpo (32)	Giannis Antetokounmpo (13)	Antetokounmpo, Hill (6)	Fiserv Forum; 18,412	51–8

March : 2–4 (home: 1–0; road: 1–4)

Game	Date	Team	Score	High points	High rebounds	High assists	Location Attendance	Record
60	March 1	@ Charlotte	W 93–85	Giannis Antetokounmpo (41)	Giannis Antetokounmpo (20)	Giannis Antetokounmpo (6)	Spectrum Center; 19,149	52–8
61	March 2	@ Miami	L 89–105	Brook Lopez (21)	Giannis Antetokounmpo (15)	Eric Bledsoe (4)	American Airlines Arena; 19,600	52–9
62	March 4	Indiana	W 119–100	Giannis Antetokounmpo (29)	Giannis Antetokounmpo (12)	Eric Bledsoe (7)	Fiserv Forum; 17,695	53–9
63	March 6	@ L. A. Lakers	L 103–113	Giannis Antetokounmpo (32)	Giannis Antetokounmpo (11)	Giannis Antetokounmpo (6)	Staples Center; 18,997	53–10
64	March 8	@ Phoenix	L 131–140	Khris Middleton (39)	DiVincenzo, İlyasova (7)	Eric Bledsoe (7)	Talking Stick Resort Arena; 17,282	53–11
65	March 9	@ Denver	L 95–109	Kyle Korver (23)	D. J. Wilson (9)	Frank Mason III (5)	Pepsi Center; 19,838	53–12

Seeding games: 3–5 (home: 2–2; road: 1–3)

Game	Date	Team	Score	High points	High rebounds	High assists	Location Attendance	Record
66	July 31	Boston	W 119–112	Giannis Antetokounmpo (36)	Giannis Antetokounmpo (15)	Khris Middleton (8)	HP Field House; No In-Person Attendance	54–12
67	August 2	@ Houston	L 116–120	Giannis Antetokounmpo (36)	Giannis Antetokounmpo (18)	Giannis Antetokounmpo (8)	AdventHealth Arena; No In-Person Attendance	54–13
68	August 4	Brooklyn	L 116–119	Giannis Antetokounmpo (16)	Ersan İlyasova (10)	Donte DiVincenzo (6)	Visa Athletic Center; No In-Person Attendance	54–14
69	August 6	Miami	W 130–116	Antetokounmpo, Middleton (30)	Giannis Antetokounmpo (12)	Khris Middleton (8)	AdventHealth Arena; No In-Person Attendance	55–14
70	August 8	@ Dallas	L 132–136 (OT)	Giannis Antetokounmpo (34)	Giannis Antetokounmpo (13)	Khris Middleton (11)	AdventHealth Arena; No In-Person Attendance	55–15
71	August 10	Toronto	L 106–114	Kyle Korver (19)	Donte DiVincenzo (9)	Eric Bledsoe (8)	HP Field House; No In-Person Attendance	55–16
72	August 11	@ Washington	W 126–113	Brook Lopez (24)	Giannis Antetokounmpo (9)	Hill, Mason III (6)	Visa Athletic Center; No In-Person Attendance	56–16
73	August 13	@ Memphis	L 106–119	Brook Lopez (19)	Brook Lopez (9)	Frank Mason III (8)	Visa Athletic Center; No In-Person Attendance	56–17

Cancelled games

Game	Date	Team	Score	High points	High rebounds	High assists	Location Attendance	Record
66	March 12	Boston					Fiserv Forum	
67	March 14	Golden State					Fiserv Forum	
68	March 16	Miami					Fiserv Forum	
69	March 19	Memphis					Fiserv Forum	
70	March 21	@ Washington					Capital One Arena	
71	March 23	Detroit					Fiserv Forum	
72	March 25	Houston					Fiserv Forum	
73	March 27	Washington					Fiserv Forum	
74	March 29	@ Dallas					American Airlines Center	
75	April 1	Toronto					Fiserv Forum	
76	April 3	@ Toronto					Scotiabank Arena	
77	April 5	@ Boston					TD Garden	
78	April 7	@ Philadelphia					Wells Fargo Center	
79	April 9	Brooklyn					Fiserv Forum	
80	April 11	@ Cleveland					Rocket Mortgage FieldHouse	
81	April 12	Atlanta					Fiserv Forum	
82	April 15	@ Brooklyn					Barclays Center	

2019–20 season schedule

=== Playoffs ===
2020 playoff game log
Total: 5–5 (home: 2–4; road: 3–1)
First Round: 4–1 (home: 2–1; road: 2–0)

Game	Date	Team	Score	High points	High rebounds	High assists	Location Attendance	Series
1	August 18	Orlando	L 110–122	Giannis Antetokounmpo (31)	Giannis Antetokounmpo (17)	Giannis Antetokounmpo (7)	HP Field House; No in-person attendance	0–1
2	August 20	Orlando	W 111–96	Giannis Antetokounmpo (28)	Giannis Antetokounmpo (20)	Eric Bledsoe (7)	HP Field House; No in-person attendance	1–1
3	August 22	@ Orlando	W 121–107	Giannis Antetokounmpo (35)	Giannis Antetokounmpo (11)	Eric Bledsoe (8)	HP Field House; No in-person attendance	2–1
4	August 24	@ Orlando	W 121–106	Giannis Antetokounmpo (31)	Giannis Antetokounmpo (15)	Giannis Antetokounmpo (8)	HP Field House; No in-person attendance	3–1
5	August 29	Orlando	W 118–104	Giannis Antetokounmpo (28)	Giannis Antetokounmpo (17)	Eric Bledsoe (8)	AdventHealth Arena; No in-person attendance	4–1

Conference semifinals: 1–4 (home: 0–3; road: 1–1)

Game	Date	Team	Score	High points	High rebounds	High assists	Location Attendance	Series
1	August 31	Miami	L 104–115	Khris Middleton (28)	Giannis Antetokounmpo (10)	Giannis Antetokounmpo (9)	HP Field House; No in-person attendance	0–1
2	September 2	Miami	L 114–116	Giannis Antetokounmpo (29)	Giannis Antetokounmpo (14)	Khris Middleton (8)	HP Field House; No in-person attendance	0–2
3	September 4	@ Miami	L 100–115	Brook Lopez (22)	Giannis Antetokounmpo (16)	Giannis Antetokounmpo (9)	HP Field House; No in-person attendance	0–3
4	September 6	@ Miami	W 118–115 (OT)	Khris Middleton (36)	Eric Bledsoe (10)	Khris Middleton (8)	AdventHealth Arena; No in-person attendance	1–3
5	September 8	Miami	L 94–103	Khris Middleton (23)	Brook Lopez (14)	Eric Bledsoe (9)	HP Field House; No in-person attendance	1–4

2020 playoff schedule

== Player statistics ==
Legend
GP	Games played	GS	Games started	MPG	Minutes per game
FG%	Field-goal percentage	3P%	3-point field-goal percentage	FT%	Free-throw percentage
RPG	Rebounds per game	APG	Assists per game	SPG	Steals per game
BPG	Blocks per game	PPG	Points per game

=== Regular season ===
Milwaukee Bucks statistics
Player	GP	GS	MPG	FG%	3P%	FT%	RPG	APG	SPG	BPG	PPG
Brook Lopez	68	67	26.7	.435	.314	.836	4.6	1.5	.7	2.4	12.0
Wesley Matthews	67	67	24.4	.396	.364	.765	2.5	1.4	.6	.1	7.4
Pat Connaughton	67	4	18.6	.455	.331	.775	4.2	1.6	.4	.5	5.4
Donte DiVincenzo	66	24	23.0	.455	.336	.733	4.8	2.3	1.3	.3	9.2
Robin Lopez	66	5	14.5	.492	.333	.528	2.4	.7	.2	.7	5.4
Giannis Antetokounmpo	63	63	30.4	.553	.304	.633	13.6	5.6	1.0	1.0	29.5
Ersan İlyasova	63	8	15.7	.466	.365	.828	4.8	.8	.4	.3	6.6
Khris Middleton	62	59	29.9	.497	.415	.916	6.2	4.3	.9	.1	20.9
Eric Bledsoe	61	61	27.0	.475	.344	.790	4.6	5.4	.9	.4	14.9
George Hill	59	2	21.5	.516	.460	.842	3.0	3.1	.8	.1	9.4
Kyle Korver	58	1	16.6	.430	.418	.854	2.1	1.2	.4	.2	6.7
Sterling Brown	52	1	14.8	.371	.324	.800	3.5	1.0	.6	.1	5.1
D. J. Wilson	37	1	9.8	.394	.247	.611	2.5	.7	.1	.1	3.6
Thanasis Antetokounmpo	20	2	6.5	.500	.000	.412	1.2	.8	.4	.1	2.8
Marvin Williams^{†}	17	0	18.9	.439	.308	.857	4.4	1.1	.6	.5	4.0
Frank Mason III	9	0	13.1	.451	.286	.588	2.1	3.2	.6	.1	6.9
Dragan Bender^{†}	7	0	13.0	.476	.444	.667	2.9	1.3	.0	.7	3.7

=== Playoffs ===
Milwaukee Bucks statistics
Player	GP	GS	MPG	FG%	3P%	FT%	RPG	APG	SPG	BPG	PPG
Khris Middleton	10	10	35.5	.394	.354	.826	6.9	6.0	1.1	.2	20.3
Brook Lopez	10	10	32.8	.535	.396	.750	5.5	.5	1.0	1.3	15.8
Wesley Matthews	10	10	24.6	.421	.395	.700	1.8	.9	.9	.4	7.2
George Hill	10	1	26.8	.478	.357	.808	2.4	3.1	.6	.0	9.5
Donte DiVincenzo	10	1	16.5	.451	.333	.650	3.2	1.2	.7	.3	6.6
Marvin Williams	10	0	17.9	.447	.435	1.000	4.8	.9	.5	.3	5.5
Pat Connaughton	10	0	17.1	.429	.348	1.000	3.9	1.1	.2	.2	4.0
Kyle Korver	10	0	11.9	.426	.405	1.000	.8	.1	.3	.1	6.2
Giannis Antetokounmpo	9	9	30.8	.559	.325	.580	13.8	5.7	.7	.9	26.7
Eric Bledsoe	9	9	29.7	.388	.250	.808	4.6	5.9	1.2	.7	11.7
Ersan İlyasova	3	0	7.7	.333	.200	1.000	1.3	.0	.7	.0	3.0
Robin Lopez	3	0	7.0	.750			1.3	.0	.0	.0	2.0
Frank Mason III	2	0	1.0				.0	.5	.0	.0	.0
Sterling Brown	1	0	4.0	.000	.000		1.0	.0	.0	.0	.0

- ^{†} Denotes player spent time with another team in the season. Stats reflect time with the Bucks only.

== Transactions ==
=== Overview ===
Players Added

Via draft

Via trade

Via free agency

- Dragan Bender
- Kyle Korver
- Robin Lopez
- Wesley Matthews
- Marvin Williams
Players Lost

Via trade

- Malcolm Brogdon
- Tony Snell

Via free agency

- Tim Frazier
- Pau Gasol
- Nikola Mirotić

Waived

- Bonzie Colson

=== Free agency ===
==== Additions ====
Player	Signed	Former Team
Thanasis Antetokounmpo	July 16	Panathinaikos B.C.

==== Subtractions ====
Player	Signed	New Team
Malcolm Brogdon	June 29	Indiana Pacers
