= JaKarr Sampson =

American basketball player (born 1993)

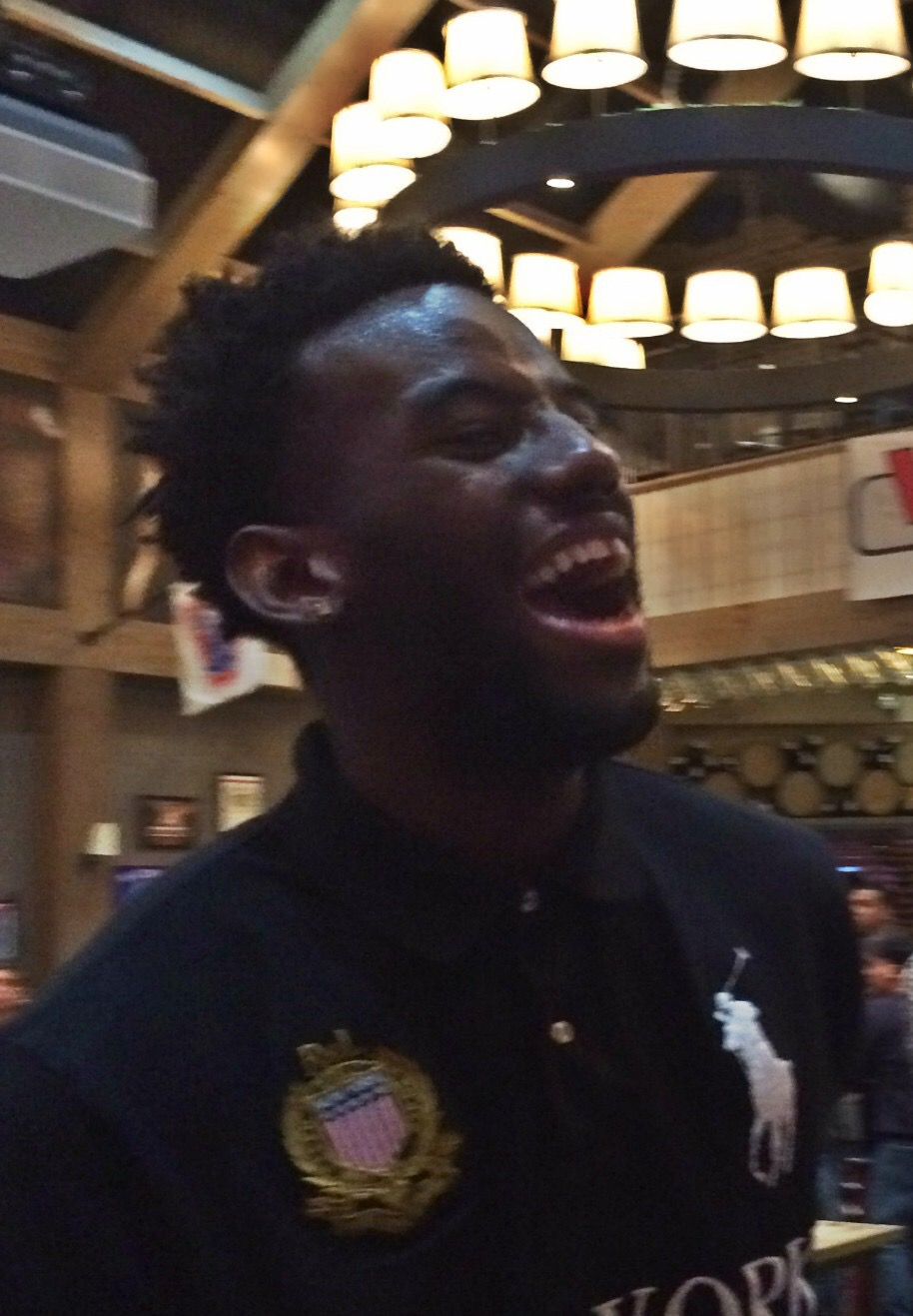
- Sampson in 2014

No. 23 – Beijing Ducks
- Position: Power forward
- League: CBA

Personal information
- Born: March 20, 1993 (age 33) Cleveland, Ohio, U.S.
- Listed height: 6 ft 7 in (2.01 m)
- Listed weight: 215 lb (98 kg)

Career information
- High school: St. Vincent–St. Mary (Akron, Ohio); Brewster Academy (Wolfeboro, New Hampshire)
- College: St. John's (2012–2014)
- NBA draft: 2014: undrafted
- Playing career: 2014–present

Career history
- 2014–2016: Philadelphia 76ers
- 2014: →Delaware 87ers
- 2016: Denver Nuggets
- 2016–2017: Iowa Energy
- 2017–2018: Sacramento Kings
- 2017–2018: →Reno Bighorns
- 2018: Windy City Bulls
- 2018–2019: Shandong Golden Stars
- 2019: Windy City Bulls
- 2019: Chicago Bulls
- 2019–2021: Indiana Pacers
- 2019: →Fort Wayne Mad Ants
- 2021–2022: Virtus Bologna
- 2022–2023: Liaoning Flying Leopards
- 2023–2024: Beijing Royal Fighters
- 2024–2025: Kuwait SC
- 2025–2026: Zhejiang Lions
- 2026–present: Beijing Ducks

Career highlights
- CBA champion (2023); EuroCup champion (2022); NBA D-League All-Star (2017); Big East Rookie of the Year (2013); Big East All-Rookie Team (2013)
- Stats at NBA.com
- Stats at Basketball Reference

JaKarr Jordan Sampson (born March 20, 1993) is an American-Bahraini professional basketball player for the Beijing Ducks of the Chinese Basketball Association (CBA). He played college basketball for the St. John's Red Storm. He is a frequent rebounder and shot-blocker, and is noted for his speed and a near 7'0" wingspan. He won a national championship with Brewster Academy in 2012 after achieving star status with his high school team.

== High school career ==
Sampson attended St. Vincent–St. Mary High School in Akron, Ohio from 2007 to 2010, before transferring to Brewster Academy in August 2010 for his senior year.

In November 2010, he signed a National Letter of Intent to play college basketball at St. John's University.

As a senior in 2010–11, Sampson averaged 15.0 points, 7.0 rebounds and 3.0 blocks per game, leading Brewster to a 31–3 record. He went on to be named to the All-NEPSAC first team.

Following the 2010–11 season, Sampson was set to join the St. John's Red Storm in 2011–12 for his freshman season, but failed to qualify academically and was ineligible to attend college. Sampson subsequently returned to Brewster Academy for another season, and led Brewster to a prep national championship. In 2011–12, he averaged 18.5 points and 11.0 rebounds per game as he was named the NEPSAC AAA Player of the Year and Most Valuable Player of the National Prep Championship.

In March 2012, Sampson recommitted to St. John's.

== College career ==
In his freshman season at St. John's, Sampson was named the 2013 Big East Rookie of the Year, and was also named to the Big East All-Rookie team. In 33 games, he averaged 14.9 points, 6.6 rebounds, 1.1 assists, 1.1 steals and 1.1 blocks in 31.5 minutes per game.

In his sophomore season, he recorded 424 points and 202 rebounds, completing his Red Storm career with totals of 915 points and 420 rebounds. He was named to the 2013 Pre-season All-Big East second team. In 33 games, he averaged 12.8 points, 6.1 rebounds, 1.2 assists and 1.0 blocks in 29.0 minutes per game.

On March 24, 2014, Sampson announced his intentions to enter the 2014 NBA draft and forgo his final two years of college eligibility.

== Professional career ==
=== Philadelphia 76ers (2014–2016) ===
After going undrafted in the 2014 NBA draft, Sampson joined the Philadelphia 76ers for the 2014 NBA Summer League. On September 29, 2014, he signed with the 76ers. On November 21, Sampson was assigned to the Delaware 87ers, the 76ers' D-League affiliate. Three days later, he was recalled by the 76ers. Sampson made 74 appearances (including 32 starts) for Philadelphia during his rookie campaign, averaging 5.2 points, 2.2 rebounds, and 1.0 assist.

Sampson made 47 appearances (including 18 starts) for the 76ers during the 2015–16 NBA season, recording averages of 5.1 points, 2.7 rebounds, and 0.6 assists. On February 18, 2016, Sampson was waived by the team.

=== Denver Nuggets (2016) ===
On February 22, 2016, Sampson signed with the Denver Nuggets. The next day, he made his debut with the Nuggets in a 114–110 loss to the Sacramento Kings, recording one rebound and one steal in fourteen minutes off the bench. Sampson made 26 appearances (22 starts) for Denver, logging averages of 5.2 points, 2.3 rebounds, and 0.6 assists. On October 15, Sampson was waived by the Nuggets.

=== Iowa Energy (2016–2017) ===
On October 21, 2016, Sampson signed with the Memphis Grizzlies, but was waived the next day. Seven days later, he was acquired by the Iowa Energy of the NBA Development League as an affiliate player of the Grizzlies. On February 6, 2017, he was named in the Western Conference All-Star team for the 2017 NBA D-League All-Star Game.

=== Sacramento Kings (2017–2018) ===
On July 29, 2017, Sampson was signed to a two-way contract by the Sacramento Kings of the NBA. Under the terms of the deal, for the 2017–18 season, he will have a one-year deal splitting time between the Kings and their G-League affiliate, the Reno Bighorns. On December 6, Sampson grabbed a career-high 16 rebounds in a loss to the Cleveland Cavaliers. Sampson played 35 games with the Bighorns and averaged 17.9 points, 7.1 rebounds and 1.06 steals per game. In 22 appearances (six starts) for Sacramento in the 2017–18 season, he recorded averages of 4.7 points, 3.5 rebounds, and 0.4 assists.

=== Windy City Bulls (2018) ===
On September 24, 2018, Sampson signed with the Chicago Bulls for training camp. He was waived by the Bulls on October 12. On October 20, the Windy City Bulls announced that they had acquired the returning rights to Sampson Johnson and the No. 38 overall pick in the 2018 NBA G League Draft, Mike Amius from Iowa Wolves for the returning rights to Jarell Eddie and Jaylen Johnson, and later on November 9, the Windy City Bulls acquired Sampson.

=== Shandong Golden Stars (2018–2019) ===
On December 19, 2018, Shandong Golden Stars of the Chinese Basketball Association (CBA) was reported to have signed Sampson in replacing injured Donatas Motiejūnas.

=== Second stint with Windy City Bulls (2019) ===
On January 29, 2019, the Windy City Bulls re-acquired Sampson.

=== Chicago Bulls (2019) ===
On March 31, 2019, the Chicago Bulls announced that they had signed Sampson to a 10-day contract. Over four games with the Bulls, Sampson averaged 20.0 points and 8.0 rebounds off the bench.

=== Shandong Heroes (2019) ===
On July 4, 2019, Sampson signed with the Shandong Heroes of the Chinese Basketball Association (CBA).

=== Indiana Pacers (2019–2021) ===
On August 2, 2019, Sampson signed a one–year contract worth $1,737,145 with the Indiana Pacers. He made 34 appearances (including 12 starts) for Indiana during the 2019–20 season, averaging 4.6 points, 2.6 rebounds, and 0.6 assists.

On November 29, 2020, Sampson re-signed with the Pacers. On April 21, 2021, Sampson was suspended for one game without pay for headbutting Patty Mills during an altercation between the Pacers and the San Antonio Spurs. He made 29 appearances (four starts) for the Pacers during the 2020–21 season, averaging 4.6 points and 2.7 rebounds.

=== Virtus Bologna (2021–2022) ===
On September 27, 2021, Sampson signed a 2-year deal with Virtus Bologna of the Italian Lega Basket Serie A (LBA); the team also plays in the EuroCup. After having ousted Lietkabelis, Ulm and Valencia in the first three rounds of the playoffs, on May 11, 2022, Virtus defeated Frutti Extra Bursaspor by 80–67 at the Segafredo Arena, winning its first EuroCup and qualifying for the EuroLeague after 14 years. However, despite having ended the regular season at the first place and having ousted 3–0 both Pesaro and Tortona in the first two rounds of playoffs, Virtus was defeated 4–2 in the national finals by Olimpia Milano.

=== Liaoning Flying Leopards (2022–2023) ===
On September 23, 2022, Sampson signed with Liaoning Flying Leopards of the Chinese Basketball Association (CBA).

== National team ==
Sampson has been representing Bahrain as a resident naturalized player, he was selected in the squad for the 2026 Asian Games in Japan.

== Career statistics ==
Legend
GP	Games played	GS	Games started	MPG	Minutes per game
FG%	Field goal percentage	3P%	3-point field goal percentage	FT%	Free throw percentage
RPG	Rebounds per game	APG	Assists per game	SPG	Steals per game
BPG	Blocks per game	PPG	Points per game	**Bold**	Career high

=== NBA ===
==== Regular season ====
Year	Team	GP	GS	MPG	FG%	3P%	FT%	RPG	APG	SPG	BPG	PPG
2014–15	Philadelphia	**74**	**32**	15.3	.422	.244	.670	2.2	**1.0**	.5	.4	5.2
2015–16	Philadelphia	47	18	14.7	.426	.176	.639	2.7	.6	.2	.3	5.1
2015–16	Denver	26	22	18.0	.470	.276	.720	2.3	.6	**.5**	.7	5.2
2017–18	Sacramento	22	6	15.6	.543	**.500**	.625	3.5	.4	.4	**1.0**	4.7
2018–19	Chicago	4	0	**31.8**	.537	.357	**.810**	**8.0**	**1.0**	**1.0**	.8	**20.0**
2019–20	Indiana	34	12	13.9	**.591**	.154	.667	2.6	.6	.5	.4	4.6
2020–21	Indiana	29	4	10.9	.496	.200	.655	2.7	.1	.1	.5	4.6
Career		236	94	15.0	.471	.248	.670	2.7	.7	.4	.5	5.2

==== Playoffs ====
Year	Team	GP	GS	MPG	FG%	3P%	FT%	RPG	APG	SPG	BPG	PPG
2019–20	Indiana	4	0	12.5	.625	–	–	3.3	1.0	.5	.0	5.0

=== College ===
Year	Team	GP	GS	MPG	FG%	3P%	FT%	RPG	APG	SPG	BPG	PPG
2012–13	St. John's	**33**	**33**	**31.5**	.449	.000	**.640**	**6.6**	1.1	**1.1**	**1.1**	**14.9**
2013–14	St. John's	33	32	29.0	**.495**	**.200**	.565	6.1	**1.2**	0.6	1.0	12.8

== Personal life ==
Sampson is the son of Dawnette Epps and Darrel Sampson, and has two brothers, D. J. and Justin. Through his college career, the Akron native was nicknamed SpongeBob Sampson.
