= 2019–20 Charlotte Hornets season =

NBA professional basketball team season

- Head coach: James Borrego
- General manager: Mitch Kupchak
- Owners: Michael Jordan
- Arena: Spectrum Center

Results
- Record: 23–42 (.354)
- Place: Division: 4th (Southeast); Conference: 10th (Eastern)
- Playoff finish: Did not qualify
- Stats at Basketball Reference

Local media
- Television: Fox Sports Carolinas, Fox Sports Southeast
- Radio: WFNZ

The 2019–20 Charlotte Hornets season was the 30th season of the franchise in the National Basketball Association (NBA). This was the first time since 2010 (as the Charlotte Bobcats) without Kemba Walker, as he joined the Boston Celtics prior to the 2019–20 NBA season.

The season was suspended by the league officials following the games of March 11 after it was reported that Rudy Gobert tested positive for COVID-19. On June 4, 2020, the season came to an end for the Hornets when the NBA Board of Governors approved a plan that would restart the season with 22 teams returning to play in the NBA Bubble on July 31, 2020, which was approved by the National Basketball Players Association the next day.

== NBA draft ==
Round	Pick	Player	Position	Nationality	School/club team
1	12	P. J. Washington	PF	United States	Kentucky
2	36	Cody Martin	SF	United States	Nevada
2	52	Jalen McDaniels	PF	United States	San Diego State

The Hornets hold a lottery selection pick and three second round draft picks before entering the draft. Both second round picks were acquired through previous trades, while the first round pick is the Hornets' own. The third second round pick would be then moved to multiple trades before moving to the Miami Heat.

== Roster ==
2019–20 Charlotte Hornets roster
Players

Pos.	No.	Player	Height	Weight	DOB	From
G/F	7	Dwayne Bacon	6 ft 7 in (2.01 m)	221 lb (100 kg)	1995–08–30	Florida State
G/F	5	Nicolas Batum	6 ft 9 in (2.06 m)	230 lb (104 kg)	1988–12–14	France
C	8	Bismack Biyombo	6 ft 9 in (2.06 m)	255 lb (116 kg)	1992–08–28	Republic of the Congo
F	0	Miles Bridges	6 ft 6 in (1.98 m)	225 lb (102 kg)	1998–03–21	Michigan State
G	4	Devonte' Graham	6 ft 1 in (1.85 m)	195 lb (88 kg)	1995–02–22	Kansas
C	9	Willy Hernangómez	6 ft 11 in (2.11 m)	250 lb (113 kg)	1994–05–27	Spain
F	10	Caleb Martin	6 ft 5 in (1.96 m)	205 lb (93 kg)	1995–09–28	Nevada
F	11	Cody Martin	6 ft 5 in (1.96 m)	205 lb (93 kg)	1995–09–28	Nevada
F	6	Jalen McDaniels	6 ft 10 in (2.08 m)	205 lb (93 kg)	1998–01–31	San Diego State
G	1	Malik Monk (S)	6 ft 3 in (1.91 m)	200 lb (91 kg)	1998–02–04	Kentucky
G	3	Terry Rozier	6 ft 1 in (1.85 m)	190 lb (86 kg)	1994–03–17	Louisville
G	23	Kobi Simmons (TW)	6 ft 5 in (1.96 m)	180 lb (82 kg)	1997–07–04	Arizona
F	26	Ray Spalding (TW)	6 ft 10 in (2.08 m)	225 lb (102 kg)	1997–03–11	Louisville
F	25	P. J. Washington	6 ft 7 in (2.01 m)	230 lb (104 kg)	1998–08–23	Kentucky
C	40	Cody Zeller	7 ft 0 in (2.13 m)	240 lb (109 kg)	1992–10–05	Indiana

Coaches
Head coach
- James Borrego
Assistant(s)
- Dutch Gaitley
- Jay Hernandez
- Chad Iske
- Armon Johnson
- Ronald Nored
- Jay Triano

Legend
- (DP) Unsigned draft pick
- (FA) Free agent
- (S) Suspended
- (GL) On assignment to G League affiliate
- (TW) Two-way affiliate player
- Injured

Roster
Updated: 2020–02–08

== Standings ==
Southeast Division	W	L	PCT	GB	Home	Road	Div	GP
y – Miami Heat	44	29	.603	–	29‍–‍7	15‍–‍22	10–4	73
x – Orlando Magic	33	40	.452	11.0	18‍–‍17	15‍–‍23	9–5	73
Washington Wizards	25	47	.347	18.5	16‍–‍20	9‍–‍27	5–9	72
Charlotte Hornets	23	42	.354	17.0	10‍–‍21	13‍–‍21	2–7	65
Atlanta Hawks	20	47	.299	21.0	14‍–‍20	6‍–‍27	6–7	67

Eastern Conference
#	Team	W	L	PCT	GB	GP
1	z – Milwaukee Bucks *	56	17	.767	–	73
2	y – Toronto Raptors *	53	19	.736	2.5	72
3	x – Boston Celtics	48	24	.667	7.5	72
4	x – Indiana Pacers	45	28	.616	11.0	73
5	y – Miami Heat *	44	29	.603	12.0	73
6	x – Philadelphia 76ers	43	30	.589	13.0	73
7	x – Brooklyn Nets	35	37	.486	20.5	72
8	x – Orlando Magic	33	40	.452	23.0	73
9	Washington Wizards	25	47	.347	30.5	72
10	Charlotte Hornets	23	42	.354	29.0	65
11	Chicago Bulls	22	43	.338	30.0	65
12	New York Knicks	21	45	.318	31.5	66
13	Detroit Pistons	20	46	.303	32.5	66
14	Atlanta Hawks	20	47	.299	33.0	67
15	Cleveland Cavaliers	19	46	.292	33.0	65

== Game log ==
=== Preseason ===
2019 preseason game log
Total: 1–4 (Home: 0-3; Road: 1–1)
Preseason: 1–4 (home: 0–3; road: 1–1)

Game	Date	Team	Score	High points	High rebounds	High assists	Location Attendance	Record
1	October 6	@ Boston	L 106–107	P. J. Washington (16)	Miles Bridges (10)	Terry Rozier (9)	TD Garden; 18,624	0–1
2	October 9	Miami	L 94–108	Terry Rozier (18)	Zeller, Bridges, Graham (6)	Josh Perkins (4)	Spectrum Center; 8,522	0–2
3	October 11	Philadelphia	L 87–100	Dwayne Bacon (17)	Kidd-Gilchrist, Bridges (7)	Devonte' Graham (5)	Lawrence Joel Coliseum; 10,437	0–3
4	October 14	@ Memphis	W 120–99	Terry Rozier (24)	Cody Zeller (10)	Terry Rozier (8)	FedEx Forum; 11,292	1–3
5	October 16	Detroit	L 110–116	Malik Monk (18)	Cody Zeller (9)	Malik Monk (7)	Spectrum Center; 7,749	1–4

2019–20 season schedule

=== Regular season ===
2019–20 game log
Total: 23–42 (Home: 10–21; Road: 13–21)
October: 2–3 (home: 1–1; road: 1–2)

Game	Date	Team	Score	High points	High rebounds	High assists	Location Attendance	Record
1	October 23	Chicago	W 126–125	P. J. Washington (27)	Cody Zeller (12)	Devonte' Graham (8)	Spectrum Center; 19,077	1–0
2	October 25	Minnesota	L 99–121	Devonte' Graham (24)	P. J. Washington (10)	Terry Rozier (10)	Spectrum Center; 14,879	1–1
3	October 27	@ L. A. Lakers	L 101–120	Miles Bridges (23)	Cody Zeller (14)	Devonte' Graham (5)	Staples Center; 18,997	1–2
4	October 28	@ L. A. Clippers	L 96–111	Terry Rozier (17)	Cody Zeller (14)	Devonte' Graham (12)	Staples Center; 19,068	1–3
5	October 30	@ Sacramento	W 118–111	P. J. Washington (23)	Cody Zeller (15)	Devonte' Graham (9)	Golden 1 Center; 15,416	2–3

November : 6–10 (home: 3–4; road: 3–6)

Game	Date	Team	Score	High points	High rebounds	High assists	Location Attendance	Record
6	November 2	@ Golden State	W 93–87	Dwayne Bacon (25)	Bridges, Graham, Zeller (8)	Terry Rozier (7)	Chase Center; 18,064	3–3
7	November 5	Indiana	W 122–120 (OT)	Devonte' Graham (35)	Cody Martin (11)	Devonte' Graham (6)	Spectrum Center; 13,341	4–3
8	November 7	Boston	L 87–108	Miles Bridges (18)	Bridges, Zeller (10)	Devonte' Graham (9)	Spectrum Center; 18,487	4–4
9	November 9	New Orleans	L 110–115	Devonte' Graham (24)	Bridges, Zeller (8)	Devonte' Graham (10)	Spectrum Center; 18,513	4–5
10	November 10	@ Philadelphia	L 106–114	Cody Zeller (24)	Cody Zeller (8)	Devonte' Graham (10)	Wells Fargo Center; 20,311	4–6
11	November 13	Memphis	L 117–119	Terry Rozier (33)	Zeller, Monk (8)	Miles Bridges (7)	Spectrum Center; 13,155	4–7
12	November 15	Detroit	W 109–106	Rozier, Monk (19)	Cody Zeller (7)	Devonte' Graham (10)	Spectrum Center; 16,778	5–7
13	November 16	@ New York	W 103–102	Devonte' Graham (29)	Nicolas Batum (9)	Nicolas Batum (6)	Madison Square Garden; 19,401	6–7
14	November 18	@ Toronto	L 96–132	Marvin Williams (14)	Nicolas Batum (6)	Devonte' Graham (6)	Scotiabank Arena; 19,800	6–8
15	November 20	@ Brooklyn	L 91–101	Terry Rozier (18)	Zeller, Biyombo (7)	Devonte' Graham (6)	Barclays Center; 14,011	6–9
16	November 22	@ Washington	L 118–125	Miles Bridges (31)	Miles Bridges (8)	Batum, Graham (7)	Capital One Arena; 15,053	6–10
17	November 23	Chicago	L 115–116	Terry Rozier (28)	Bismack Biyombo (12)	Devonte' Graham (10)	Spectrum Center; 17,891	6–11
18	November 25	@ Miami	L 100–117	Terry Rozier (19)	Terry Rozier (9)	Devonte' Graham (8)	American Airlines Arena; 19,600	6–12
19	November 27	Detroit	W 102–101	Bismack Biyombo (19)	Bismack Biyombo (9)	Devonte' Graham (15)	Spectrum Center; 15,535	7–12
20	November 29	@ Detroit	W 110–107	P. J. Washington (26)	Bismack Biyombo (9)	Devonte' Graham (8)	Little Caesars Arena; 15,006	8–12
21	November 30	@ Milwaukee	L 96–137	Devonte' Graham (24)	Willy Hernangomez (9)	Devonte' Graham (5)	Fiserv Forum; 17,550	8–13

December : 5–10 (home: 3–6; road: 2–4)

Game	Date	Team	Score	High points	High rebounds	High assists	Location Attendance	Record
22	December 2	Phoenix	L 104–109	Marvin Williams (22)	Bismack Biyombo (11)	Devonte' Graham (13)	Spectrum Center; 11,221	8–14
23	December 4	Golden State	W 106–91	Devonte' Graham (33)	Rozier, Graham (7)	Devonte' Graham (9)	Spectrum Center; 14,355	9–14
24	December 6	Brooklyn	L 104–111	Devonte' Graham (29)	Rozier, Zeller (6)	Devonte' Graham (8)	Spectrum Center; 15,075	9–15
25	December 8	Atlanta	L 107–122	Washington, Bridges (20)	P. J. Washington (8)	Devonte' Graham (8)	Spectrum Center; 15,489	9–16
26	December 10	Washington	W 114–107	Devonte' Graham (29)	Bismack Biyombo (15)	Terry Rozier (7)	Spectrum Center; 10,626	10–16
27	December 11	@ Brooklyn	W 113–108	Devonte' Graham (40)	Kidd-Gilchrist, Rozier (7)	Devonte' Graham (5)	Barclays Center; 15,631	11–16
28	December 13	@ Chicago	W 83–73	Devonte' Graham (16)	Washington, Zeller (10)	Devonte' Graham (7)	United Center; 18,377	12–16
29	December 15	@ Indiana	L 85–107	Cody Zeller (19)	Bismack Biyombo (17)	Devonte' Graham (4)	Bankers Life Fieldhouse; 16,061	12–17
30	December 17	Sacramento	W 110–102	Malik Monk (23)	Bismack Biyombo (12)	Devonte' Graham (7)	Spectrum Center; 13,229	13–17
31	December 18	@ Cleveland	L 98–100	Terry Rozier (35)	Cody Zeller (9)	Devonte' Graham (9)	Rocket Mortgage FieldHouse; 17,023	13–18
32	December 21	Utah	L 107–114	Terry Rozier (29)	Cody Zeller (8)	Devonte' Graham (4)	Spectrum Center; 16,187	13–19
33	December 22	@ Boston	L 93–119	Devonte' Graham (23)	Miles Bridges (6)	Devonte' Graham (10)	TD Garden; 19,156	13–20
34	December 27	Oklahoma City	L 102–104 (OT)	Terry Rozier (26)	Bismack Biyombo (10)	Devonte' Graham (13)	Spectrum Center; 18,418	13–21
35	December 29	@ Memphis	L 104–117	Malik Monk (18)	Miles Bridges (7)	Devonte' Graham (10)	FedExForum; 16,842	13–22
36	December 31	Boston	L 92–109	P. J. Washington (15)	Miles Bridges (10)	Devonte' Graham (7)	Spectrum Center; 19,216	13–23

January : 3–9 (home: 1–4; road: 2–5)

Game	Date	Team	Score	High points	High rebounds	High assists	Location Attendance	Record
37	January 2	@ Cleveland	W 109–106	Terry Rozier (30)	Cody Zeller (7)	Devonte' Graham (11)	Rocket Mortgage FieldHouse; 17,859	14–23
38	January 4	@ Dallas	W 123–120 (OT)	Terry Rozier (27)	Bismack Biyombo (13)	Devonte' Graham (13)	American Airlines Center; 20,327	15–23
39	January 6	Indiana	L 104–115	Terry Rozier (28)	P. J. Washington (9)	Rozier, Graham (6)	Spectrum Center; 13,009	15–24
40	January 8	Toronto	L 110–112 (OT)	Terry Rozier (27)	P. J. Washington (12)	Malik Monk (7)	Spectrum Center; 13,965	15–25
41	January 10	@ Utah	L 92–109	Terry Rozier (23)	Bismack Biyombo (9)	Devonte' Graham (5)	Vivint Smart Home Arena; 18,306	15–26
42	January 12	@ Phoenix	L 92–100	Dwayne Bacon (24)	Cody Zeller (8)	Devonte' Graham (8)	Talking Stick Resort Arena; 14,751	15–27
43	January 13	@ Portland	L 112–115	Devonte' Graham (27)	P. J. Washington (11)	Devonte' Graham (10)	Moda Center; 19,111	15–28
44	January 15	@ Denver	L 86–100	Terry Rozier (20)	Miles Bridges (8)	Terry Rozier (9)	Pepsi Center; 19,520	15–29
45	January 20	Orlando	L 83–106	Malik Monk (20)	Cody Zeller (9)	Devonte' Graham (6)	Spectrum Center; 16,133	15–30
46	January 24	Milwaukee	L 103–116	Malik Monk (31)	Devonte' Graham (7)	Batum, Monk, Rozier (5)	(France) AccorHotels Arena (Paris); 15,758	15–31
47	January 28	New York	W 97–92	Terry Rozier (30)	Hernangómez, Rozier, Zeller (10)	Devonte' Graham (10)	Spectrum Center; 14,342	16–31
48	January 30	@ Washington	L 107–121	Miles Bridges (23)	Rozier, Zeller (7)	Devonte' Graham (8)	Capital One Arena; 15,013	16–32

February : 5–6 (home: 1–3; road: 4–3)

Game	Date	Team	Score	High points	High rebounds	High assists	Location Attendance	Record
49	February 1	@ San Antonio	L 90–114	Miles Bridges (25)	Cody Zeller (12)	Devonte' Graham (9)	AT&T Center; 18,615	16–33
50	February 3	Orlando	L 100–112	Terry Rozier (18)	Bridges, Martin (8)	Devonte' Graham (5)	Spectrum Center; 12,337	16–34
51	February 4	@ Houston	L 110–125	Bridges, Rozier (20)	Miles Bridges (15)	Devonte' Graham (10)	Toyota Center; 18,055	16–35
52	February 8	Dallas	L 100–116	Devonte' Graham (26)	P. J. Washington (9)	Devonte' Graham (10)	Spectrum Center; 19,370	16–36
53	February 10	@ Detroit	W 87–76	Miles Bridges (18)	Cody Zeller (10)	Devonte' Graham (11)	Little Caesars Arena; 13,941	17–36
54	February 12	@ Minnesota	W 115–108	Devonte' Graham (28)	Bismack Biyombo (10)	Devonte' Graham (8)	Target Center; 18,978	18–36
55	February 20	@ Chicago	W 103–93	Malik Monk (25)	Bridges, Zeller (8)	Devonte' Graham (7)	United Center; 17,463	19–36
56	February 22	Brooklyn	L 86–115	P. J. Washington (16)	McDaniels, Zeller (9)	Miles Bridges (5)	Spectrum Center; 19,079	19–37
57	February 25	@ Indiana	L 80–119	Miles Bridges (17)	Bridges, Martin (6)	Terry Rozier (7)	Bankers Life Fieldhouse; 16,088	19–38
58	February 26	New York	W 107–101	Terry Rozier (26)	Caleb Martin (9)	Devonte' Graham (5)	Spectrum Center; 13,152	20–38
59	February 28	@ Toronto	W 99–96	Graham, Rozier (18)	Bismack Biyombo (11)	Martin, Rozier (6)	Scotiabank Arena; 19,800	21–38

March: 2–4 (home: 2–3; road: 0–1)

Game	Date	Team	Score	High points	High rebounds	High assists	Location Attendance	Record
60	March 1	Milwaukee	L 85–93	Devonte' Graham (17)	Willy Hernangómez (13)	Hernangómez, Rozier (4)	Spectrum Center; 19,149	21–39
61	March 3	San Antonio	L 103–104	Terry Rozier (20)	Jalen McDaniels (9)	McDaniels, Rozier (5)	Spectrum Center; 12,008	21–40
62	March 5	Denver	L 112–114	Devonte' Graham (24)	Miles Bridges (9)	Graham, Martin (7)	Spectrum Center; 13,311	21–41
63	March 7	Houston	W 108–99	Terry Rozier (24)	Willy Hernangómez (11)	Cody Martin (9)	Spectrum Center; 19,159	22–41
64	March 9	@ Atlanta	L 138–143 (2OT)	Terry Rozier (40)	Cody Zeller (7)	Devonte' Graham (10)	State Farm Arena; 14,399	22–42
65	March 11	@ Miami	W 109–98	Devonte' Graham (30)	Cody Zeller (11)	Devonte' Graham (6)	American Airlines Arena; 19,600	23–42

Cancelled games

Game	Date	Team	Score	High points	High rebounds	High assists	Location Attendance	Record
66	March 13	Cleveland					Spectrum Center	
67	March 15	@ Orlando					Amway Center	
68	March 17	@ New York					Madison Square Garden	
69	March 19	Philadelphia					Spectrum Center	
70	March 21	LA Lakers					Spectrum Center	
71	March 24	Portland					Spectrum Center	
72	March 26	@ Oklahoma City					Chesapeake Energy Arena	
73	March 28	LA Clippers					Spectrum Center	
74	March 30	Miami					Spectrum Center	
75	April 1	@ Orlando					Amway Center	
76	April 3	@ Atlanta					State Farm Arena	
77	April 5	Atlanta					Spectrum Center	
78	April 7	@ New Orleans					Smoothie King Center	
79	April 8	Toronto					Spectrum Center	
80	April 11	Washington					Spectrum Center	
81	April 13	Miami					Spectrum Center	
82	April 15	@ Philadelphia					Wells Fargo Center	

2019–20 season schedule

== Player statistics ==
=== Ragular season ===
Player	POS	GP	GS	MP	REB	AST	STL	BLK	PTS	MPG	RPG	APG	SPG	BPG	PPG
Miles Bridges	SF	65	64	1,995	362	114	40	48	843	30.7	5.6	1.8	.6	.7	13.0
Terry Rozier	PG	63	63	2,164	276	259	61	10	1,134	34.3	4.4	4.1	1.0	.2	18.0
Devonte' Graham	PG	63	53	2,211	212	471	62	15	1,145	35.1	3.4	7.5	1.0	.2	18.2
P. J. Washington	PF	58	57	1,759	316	123	51	44	710	30.3	5.4	2.1	.9	.8	12.2
Cody Zeller	C	58	39	1,341	411	88	40	25	642	23.1	7.1	1.5	.7	.4	11.1
Malik Monk	SG	55	1	1,169	157	114	25	16	564	21.3	2.9	2.1	.5	.3	10.3
Bismack Biyombo	C	53	29	1,029	308	50	10	49	393	19.4	5.8	.9	.2	.9	7.4
Cody Martin	SF	48	3	903	158	95	39	9	238	18.8	3.3	2.0	.8	.2	5.0
Marvin Williams^{†}	PF	41	1	808	109	41	26	22	275	19.7	2.7	1.0	.6	.5	6.7
Dwayne Bacon	SG	39	11	687	100	52	23	2	224	17.6	2.6	1.3	.6	.1	5.7
Willy Hernangómez	C	31	0	375	134	29	10	7	190	12.1	4.3	.9	.3	.2	6.1
Nicolas Batum	SF	22	3	505	100	66	17	8	79	23.0	4.5	3.0	.8	.4	3.6
Caleb Martin	SF	18	1	317	38	23	12	7	111	17.6	2.1	1.3	.7	.4	6.2
Jalen McDaniels	SF	16	0	293	65	13	8	3	89	18.3	4.1	.8	.5	.2	5.6
Michael Kidd-Gilchrist^{†}	PF	12	0	160	35	10	0	3	48	13.3	2.9	.8	.0	.3	4.0
Joe Chealey	PG	4	0	33	0	1	4	0	2	8.3	.0	.3	1.0	.0	.5

- ^{†} Denotes player spent time with another team in the season. Stats reflect time with the Hornets only.

== Transactions ==
=== Trades ===
July 6, 2019 (sign-and-trade)	To Charlotte Hornets Terry Rozier; 2020 second-round pick	To Boston Celtics Kemba Walker

=== Free agents ===
==== Additions ====
Player	Signed	Former team
P. J. Washington	July 3, 2019	Rookie signing
Terry Rozier	July 6, 2019	Boston Celtics (sign-and-trade)
Robert Franks	July 9, 2019	Undrafted
Caleb Martin^{[a]}^{[b]}	July 31, 2019	Undrafted
Cody Martin	July 31, 2019	Rookie Signing
Joe Chealey	August 6, 2019	Re-signed
Josh Perkins	August 6, 2019	Undrafted
Thomas Welsh	August 9, 2019	Denver Nuggets
Ahmed Hill	September 5, 2019	Undrafted
Kobi Simmons^{[a]}	September 16, 2019	Cleveland Cavaliers
Jalen McDaniels^{[a]}^{[b]}	October 10, 2019	Rookie signing
Ray Spalding	January 15, 2020	Rio Grande Valley Vipers

==== Waivings ====
Player	Left	New team
Kemba Walker	July 6, 2019	Boston Celtics (sign-and-trade)
Thomas Welsh	October 10, 2019	Greensboro Swarm
Joe Chealey^{[c]}^{[d]}	October 13, 2019	Greensboro Swarm
Josh Perkins	October 13, 2019	Greensboro Swarm
Ahmed Hill	October 19, 2019	Northern Arizona Suns
Robert Franks	January 15, 2020	Greensboro Swarm
Michael Kidd-Gilchrist	February 8, 2020	Dallas Mavericks
Marvin Williams	February 8, 2020	Milwaukee Bucks

===== Notes =====
- ^{a} Contract was later converted into a two-way contract.
- ^{b} Contract was later converted into a multi-year contract.
- ^{c} Signed to a 10-day contract.
- ^{d} Signed to a second 10-day contract.
