= 2019–20 Orlando Magic season =

NBA professional basketball team season

- Head coach: Steve Clifford
- General manager: John Hammond
- Owners: RDV Sports, Inc.
- Arena: Amway Center

Results
- Record: 33–40 (.452)
- Place: Division: 2nd (Southeast); Conference: 8th (Eastern)
- Playoff finish: First round (lost to Bucks 1–4)
- Stats at Basketball Reference

Local media
- Television: Fox Sports Florida
- Radio: 96.9 The Game

The 2019–20 Orlando Magic season was the 31st season of the franchise in the National Basketball Association (NBA). On March 11, 2020, the NBA suspended play of the entire league indefinitely due to the COVID-19 pandemic. On June 4, 2020, the NBA Board of Governors approved a restart plan to resume the season on July 30, with approval from the National Basketball Players Association the next day. As a result, the Magic were one of 22 teams that were invited to play eight games each in the NBA Bubble at the ESPN Wide World of Sports Complex at Walt Disney World in Orlando, Florida. The games, which were closed to the public, counted towards the regular season to determine the seeding for the 2020 NBA playoffs.

On August 8, a loss by the Washington Wizards secured the Magic a playoff berth for the second season in a row. As the eighth seed in the Eastern Conference, the Magic drew top seeded Milwaukee Bucks in the first round of the 2020 NBA playoffs. On August 26, with the Magic facing elimination, the fifth game of the series was postponed as a result of the Milwaukee Bucks boycott in response to the shooting of Jacob Blake. This ultimately resulted in a brief suspension of the entire NBA playoffs. In the days following, games in several other leagues were postponed as players refused to play in solidarity in order to bring further awareness to the Black Lives Matter movement. When game five was eventually played, the Magic lost, ending their season.

This season marked the last time the Magic made the playoffs until the 2023–24 season.

== Draft picks ==
Round	Pick	Player	Position	Nationality	School/club team
1	16	Chuma Okeke	PF	(United States) American	Auburn
2	46	Talen Horton-Tucker	SG	(United States) American	Iowa State

The Orlando Magic had one first and second-round draft pick. The 46th pick would then be traded to the Los Angeles Lakers.

== Roster ==
2019–20 Orlando Magic roster
Players

Pos.	No.	Player	Height	Weight	DOB	From
F	2	Al-Farouq Aminu	6 ft 8 in (2.03 m)	220 lb (100 kg)	1990-09-21	Wake Forest
G	14	D. J. Augustin	5 ft 11 in (1.80 m)	183 lb (83 kg)	1987-11-10	Texas
C	5	Mo Bamba	7 ft 0 in (2.13 m)	231 lb (105 kg)	1998-05-12	Texas
C	24	Khem Birch	6 ft 9 in (2.06 m)	235 lb (107 kg)	1992-09-28	UNLV
G	7	Michael Carter-Williams	6 ft 5 in (1.96 m)	190 lb (86 kg)	1991-10-10	Syracuse
F	12	Gary Clark	6 ft 6 in (1.98 m)	225 lb (102 kg)	1994-11-16	Cincinnati
F	11	James Ennis	6 ft 7 in (2.01 m)	215 lb (98 kg)	1990-07-01	Long Beach State
G/F	10	Evan Fournier	6 ft 7 in (2.01 m)	205 lb (93 kg)	1992-10-29	France
G/F	35	Melvin Frazier	6 ft 6 in (1.98 m)	215 lb (98 kg)	1996-08-30	Tulane
G	20	Markelle Fultz	6 ft 3 in (1.91 m)	209 lb (95 kg)	1998-05-29	Washington
F	00	Aaron Gordon	6 ft 9 in (2.06 m)	235 lb (107 kg)	1995-09-16	Arizona
F	1	Jonathan Isaac	6 ft 11 in (2.11 m)	230 lb (104 kg)	1997-10-03	Florida State
G/F	25	Wes Iwundu	6 ft 7 in (2.01 m)	195 lb (88 kg)	1994-12-20	Kansas State
G	13	B. J. Johnson (TW)	6 ft 7 in (2.01 m)	200 lb (91 kg)	1995-12-21	La Salle
F	23	Vic Law (TW)	6 ft 7 in (2.01 m)	200 lb (91 kg)	1995-12-19	Northwestern
G/F	31	Terrence Ross	6 ft 7 in (2.01 m)	206 lb (93 kg)	1991-02-05	Washington
C	9	Nikola Vučević	7 ft 0 in (2.13 m)	260 lb (118 kg)	1990-10-24	USC

Coaches
Head coach
- Steve Clifford
Assistant(s)
- Tyrone Corbin
- Pat Delany
- Steve Hetzel
- Bruce Kreutzer

Legend
- (DP) Unsigned draft pick
- (FA) Free agent
- (S) Suspended
- (GL) On assignment to G League affiliate
- (TW) Two-way affiliate player
- Injured

Roster
Updated: March 3, 2020

== Standings ==
=== Division ===
Southeast Division	W	L	PCT	GB	Home	Road	Div	GP
y – Miami Heat	44	29	.603	–	29‍–‍7	15‍–‍22	10–4	73
x – Orlando Magic	33	40	.452	11.0	18‍–‍17	15‍–‍23	9–5	73
Washington Wizards	25	47	.347	18.5	16‍–‍20	9‍–‍27	5–9	72
Charlotte Hornets	23	42	.354	17.0	10‍–‍21	13‍–‍21	2–7	65
Atlanta Hawks	20	47	.299	21.0	14‍–‍20	6‍–‍27	6–7	67

=== Conference ===
Eastern Conference
#	Team	W	L	PCT	GB	GP
1	z – Milwaukee Bucks *	56	17	.767	–	73
2	y – Toronto Raptors *	53	19	.736	2.5	72
3	x – Boston Celtics	48	24	.667	7.5	72
4	x – Indiana Pacers	45	28	.616	11.0	73
5	y – Miami Heat *	44	29	.603	12.0	73
6	x – Philadelphia 76ers	43	30	.589	13.0	73
7	x – Brooklyn Nets	35	37	.486	20.5	72
8	x – Orlando Magic	33	40	.452	23.0	73
9	Washington Wizards	25	47	.347	30.5	72
10	Charlotte Hornets	23	42	.354	29.0	65
11	Chicago Bulls	22	43	.338	30.0	65
12	New York Knicks	21	45	.318	31.5	66
13	Detroit Pistons	20	46	.303	32.5	66
14	Atlanta Hawks	20	47	.299	33.0	67
15	Cleveland Cavaliers	19	46	.292	33.0	65

== Game log ==
=== Preseason ===
2019 preseason game log
Total: 3–3 (home: 0–3; road: 3–0)
Preseason: 3–3 (home: 0–3; road: 3–0)

Game	Date	Team	Score	High points	High rebounds	High assists	Location Attendance	Record
1	October 5	@ San Antonio	W 125–89	Mo Bamba (18)	Bamba, Carter-Williams, Birch (6)	Al-Farouq Aminu (5)	AT&T Center; 14,123	1–0
2	October 7	@ Detroit	W 115–91	Aaron Gordon (25)	Nikola Vučević (10)	Markelle Fultz (7)	Little Caesars Arena; 14,471	2–0
3	October 9	@ Atlanta	W 97–88	Terrence Ross (20)	Aminu, Isaac (8)	Isaac, Ross, Carter-Williams (4)	State Farm Arena; 10,945	3–0
4	October 11	Boston	L 75–100	Terrence Ross (21)	Mo Bamba (7)	Markelle Fultz (4)	Amway Center; 17,354	3–1
5	October 13	Philadelphia	L 94–126	Mo Bamba (12)	Gordon, Isaac (6)	D. J. Augustin (6)	Amway Center; 16,819	3–2
6	October 17	Miami	L 98–107	Nikola Vučević (16)	Nikola Vučević (6)	Fournier, Magette (4)	Amway Center; 17,149	3–3

2019–20 season schedule

=== Regular season ===
2019–20 game log
Total: 33–40 (home: 18–17; road: 15–23)
October: 2–2 (home: 2–0; road: 0–2)

Game	Date	Team	Score	High points	High rebounds	High assists	Location Attendance	Record
1	October 23	Cleveland	W 94–85	Nikola Vučević (21)	Nikola Vučević (10)	Markelle Fultz (6)	Amway Center; 18,846	1–0
2	October 26	@ Atlanta	L 99–103	Evan Fournier (23)	Nikola Vučević (10)	D. J. Augustin (4)	State Farm Arena; 17,078	1–1
3	October 28	@ Toronto	L 95–104	Jonathan Isaac (24)	Nikola Vučević (12)	Fultz, Gordon (5)	Scotiabank Arena; 19,800	1–2
4	October 30	New York	W 95–83	Nikola Vučević (21)	Nikola Vučević (13)	D. J. Augustin (7)	Amway Center; 17,456	2–2

November : 5–9 (home: 4–4; road: 1–5)

Game	Date	Team	Score	High points	High rebounds	High assists	Location Attendance	Record
5	November 1	Milwaukee	L 91–123	Evan Fournier (19)	Nikola Vučević (7)	D. J. Augustin (6)	Amway Center; 15,105	2–3
6	November 2	Denver	L 87–91	Nikola Vučević (24)	Al-Farouq Aminu (10)	Evan Fournier (5)	Amway Center; 17,025	2–4
7	November 5	@ Oklahoma City	L 94–102	Aaron Gordon (15)	Nikola Vučević (11)	Markelle Fultz (4)	Chesapeake Energy Arena; 18,203	2–5
8	November 6	@ Dallas	L 106–107	Aaron Gordon (23)	Nikola Vučević (11)	Nikola Vučević (7)	American Airlines Center; 19,487	2–6
9	November 8	Memphis	W 118–86	Nikola Vučević (23)	Nikola Vučević (16)	Vučević, Fournier (6)	Amway Center; 17,021	3–6
10	November 10	Indiana	L 102–109	Evan Fournier (22)	Nikola Vučević (17)	Augustin, Fournier (6)	Amway Center; 17,118	3–7
11	November 13	Philadelphia	W 112–97	Nikola Vučević (25)	Aaron Gordon (13)	D. J. Augustin (8)	Amway Center; 15,113	4–7
12	November 15	San Antonio	W 111–109	Evan Fournier (26)	Aminu, Vučević (13)	Augustin, Fultz, Gordon, Vučević (4)	Amway Center; 16,296	5–7
13	November 17	Washington	W 125–121	Nikola Vučević (30)	Nikola Vučević (17)	Evan Fournier (9)	Amway Center; 16,344	6–7
14	November 20	@ Toronto	L 97–113	Evan Fournier (21)	Jonathan Isaac (13)	Augustin, Vučević (5)	Scotiabank Arena; 19,800	6–8
15	November 23	@ Indiana	L 106–111	Evan Fournier (26)	Jonathan Isaac (9)	Markelle Fultz (9)	Bankers Life Fieldhouse; 16,446	6–9
16	November 25	@ Detroit	L 88–103	Terrence Ross (19)	Mo Bamba (12)	D. J. Augustin (5)	Little Caesars Arena; 14,695	6–10
17	November 27	@ Cleveland	W 116–104	Evan Fournier (30)	Jonathan Isaac (7)	D. J. Augustin (10)	Rocket Mortgage FieldHouse; 17,712	7–10
18	November 29	Toronto	L 83–90	Evan Fournier (19)	Khem Birch (12)	Evan Fournier (6)	Amway Center; 17,014	7–11

December : 7–8 (home: 4–3; road: 3–5)

Game	Date	Team	Score	High points	High rebounds	High assists	Location Attendance	Record
19	December 1	Golden State	W 100–96	Evan Fournier (32)	Jonathan Isaac (11)	Markelle Fultz (9)	Amway Center; 15,052	8–11
20	December 3	@ Washington	W 127–120	Evan Fournier (31)	Aaron Gordon (11)	Markelle Fultz (6)	Capital One Arena; 13,159	9–11
21	December 4	Phoenix	W 128–114	Aaron Gordon (32)	Mo Bamba (11)	D. J. Augustin (7)	Amway Center; 15,176	10–11
22	December 6	@ Cleveland	W 93–87	Terrence Ross (21)	Michael Carter-Williams (7)	D. J. Augustin (7)	Rocket Mortgage FieldHouse; 18,446	11–11
23	December 9	@ Milwaukee	L 101–110	Evan Fournier (26)	Aaron Gordon (13)	Markelle Fultz (9)	Fiserv Forum; 17,385	11–12
24	December 11	L. A. Lakers	L 87–96	Jonathan Isaac (19)	Aaron Gordon (14)	Michael Carter-Williams (6)	Amway Center; 18,846	11–13
25	December 13	Houston	L 107–130	Evan Fournier (27)	Bamba, Gordon (6)	Augustin, Fultz (5)	Amway Center; 16,335	11–14
26	December 15	@ New Orleans	W 130–119	Jonathan Isaac (21)	Jonathan Isaac (11)	D. J. Augustin (8)	Smoothie King Center; 15,388	12–14
27	December 17	@ Utah	L 102–109	D. J. Augustin (22)	Nikola Vučević (11)	Fournier, Vučević (4)	Vivint Smart Home Arena; 18,306	12–15
28	December 18	@ Denver	L 104–113	Nikola Vučević (20)	Vučević, Gordon (7)	D. J. Augustin (7)	Pepsi Center; 18,182	12–16
29	December 20	@ Portland	L 103–118	Nikola Vučević (23)	Nikola Vučević (12)	Fultz, Gordon (4)	Moda Center; 19,393	12–17
30	December 23	Chicago	W 103–95	Terrence Ross (26)	Aaron Gordon (11)	Augustin, Isaac (5)	Amway Center; 18,846	13–17
31	December 27	Philadelphia	W 98–97	Evan Fournier (20)	Nikola Vučević (12)	Nikola Vučević (7)	Amway Center; 17,311	14–17
32	December 28	@ Milwaukee	L 100–111	Evan Fournier (23)	Jonathan Isaac (9)	Markelle Fultz (6)	Fiserv Forum; 17,920	14–18
33	December 30	Atlanta	L 93–101	Nikola Vučević (27)	Jonathan Isaac (9)	D. J. Augustin (6)	Amway Center; 17,784	14–19

January : 7–8 (home: 3–4; road: 4–4)

Game	Date	Team	Score	High points	High rebounds	High assists	Location Attendance	Record
34	January 1	@ Washington	W 122–101	D. J. Augustin (25)	Nikola Vučević (12)	D. J. Augustin (9)	Capital One Arena; 14,921	15–19
35	January 3	Miami	W 105–85	Terrence Ross (25)	Bamba, Vučević (11)	Augustin, Vučević (7)	Amway Center; 17,198	16–19
36	January 4	Utah	L 96–109	Terrence Ross (24)	Nikola Vučević (13)	Markelle Fultz (7)	Amway Center; 16,913	16–20
37	January 6	Brooklyn	W 101–89	Markelle Fultz (25)	Nikola Vučević (24)	D. J. Augustin (6)	Amway Center; 15,008	17–20
38	January 8	Washington	W 123–89	Nikola Vučević (29)	Birch, Vučević (9)	Markelle Fultz (7)	Amway Center; 16,013	18–20
39	January 10	@ Phoenix	L 94–98	Evan Fournier (28)	Nikola Vučević (13)	Markelle Fultz (6)	Talking Stick Resort Arena; 14,562	18–21
40	January 13	@ Sacramento	W 114–112	Nikola Vučević (26)	Nikola Vučević (15)	Evan Fournier (6)	Golden 1 Center; 16,299	19–21
41	January 15	@ L. A. Lakers	W 119–118	Fultz, Gordon (21)	Fultz, Bamba (11)	Markelle Fultz (10)	Staples Center; 18,997	20–21
42	January 16	@ L. A. Clippers	L 95–122	Nikola Vučević (22)	Nikola Vučević (9)	Fultz, Gordon (5)	Staples Center; 19,068	20–22
43	January 18	@ Golden State	L 95–109	Markelle Fultz (23)	Nikola Vučević (13)	Fournier, Fultz (4)	Chase Center; 18,064	20–23
44	January 20	@ Charlotte	W 106–83	Evan Fournier (26)	Nikola Vučević (10)	Aaron Gordon (7)	Spectrum Center; 16,133	21–23
45	January 22	Oklahoma City	L 114–120	Terrence Ross (26)	Nikola Vučević (11)	Fournier, Fultz (6)	Amway Center; 18,846	21–24
46	January 24	Boston	L 98–109	Evan Fournier (30)	Nikola Vučević (12)	Fultz, Vučević (4)	Amway Center; 18,846	21–25
47	January 26	L. A. Clippers	L 97–112	Michael Carter-Williams (15)	Aaron Gordon (10)	Michael Carter-Williams (8)	Amway Center; 15,427	21–26
48	January 27	@ Miami	L 92–113	Gordon, Vučević (13)	Nikola Vučević (12)	Evan Fournier (8)	American Airlines Arena; 19,600	21–27

February : 6–6 (home: 3–3; road: 3–3)

Game	Date	Team	Score	High points	High rebounds	High assists	Location Attendance	Record
49	February 1	Miami	L 89–102	Aaron Gordon (24)	Nikola Vučević (9)	Markelle Fultz (6)	Amway Center; 18,846	21–28
50	February 3	@ Charlotte	W 112–100	Nikola Vučević (22)	Aaron Gordon (12)	Markelle Fultz (14)	Spectrum Center; 12,337	22–28
51	February 5	@ Boston	L 100–116	Evan Fournier (26)	Gordon, Vučević (10)	Michael Carter-Williams (6)	TD Garden; 19,156	22–29
52	February 6	@ New York	L 103–105	Nikola Vučević (25)	Nikola Vučević (8)	Markelle Fultz (6)	Madison Square Garden; 18,895	22–30
53	February 8	Milwaukee	L 95–111	Nikola Vučević (21)	Nikola Vučević (14)	Carter-Williams, Vučević (6)	Amway Center; 16,632	22–31
54	February 10	Atlanta	W 135–126	Aaron Gordon (26)	Gordon, Vučević (9)	Nikola Vučević (9)	Amway Center; 17,076	23–31
55	February 12	Detroit	W 116–112 (OT)	Aaron Gordon (25)	Nikola Vučević (11)	Markelle Fultz (10)	Amway Center; 16,607	24–31
All-Star Break
56	February 21	Dallas	L 106–122	Evan Fournier (28)	Gordon, Vučević (12)	Markelle Fultz (9)	Amway Center; 18,846	24–32
57	February 24	@ Brooklyn	W 115–113	Aaron Gordon (27)	Gordon, Vučević (10)	Markelle Fultz (7)	Barclays Center; 16,162	25–32
58	February 26	@ Atlanta	W 130–120	Evan Fournier (28)	Nikola Vučević (12)	Markelle Fultz (8)	State Farm Arena; 14,967	26–32
59	February 28	Minnesota	W 136–125	Terrence Ross (33)	Aaron Gordon (11)	Aaron Gordon (12)	Amway Center; 18,846	27–32
60	February 29	@ San Antonio	L 113–114	Evan Fournier (23)	Nikola Vučević (9)	D. J. Augustin (7)	AT&T Center; 18,354	27–33

March : 3–2 (home: 0–1; road: 3–1)

Game	Date	Team	Score	High points	High rebounds	High assists	Location Attendance	Record
61	March 2	Portland	L 107–130	Nikola Vučević (30)	Nikola Vučević (11)	Markelle Fultz (10)	Amway Center; 18,078	27–34
62	March 4	@ Miami	L 113–116	Terrence Ross (35)	Nikola Vučević (16)	Aaron Gordon (9)	American Airlines Arena; 19,600	27–35
63	March 6	@ Minnesota	W 132–118	Nikola Vučević (28)	Nikola Vučević (12)	Augustin, Fultz, Williams (5)	Target Center; 14,315	28–35
64	March 8	@ Houston	W 126–106	D. J. Augustin (24)	Nikola Vučević (16)	Markelle Fultz (5)	Toyota Center; 18,055	29–35
65	March 10	@ Memphis	W 120–115	Terrence Ross (24)	Nikola Vučević (11)	Aaron Gordon (9)	FedExForum; 15,388	30–35

Seeding games: 3–5 (home: 2–2; road: 1–3)

Game	Date	Team	Score	High points	High rebounds	High assists	Location Attendance	Record
66	July 31	@ Brooklyn	W 128–118	Evan Fournier (24)	Aaron Gordon (11)	Markelle Fultz (6)	HP Field House; No in-person attendance	31–35
67	August 2	Sacramento	W 132–116	Terrence Ross (25)	Nikola Vučević (11)	D. J. Augustin (8)	HP Field House; No in-person attendance	32–35
68	August 4	@ Indiana	L 109–120	Nikola Vučević (24)	Nikola Vučević (10)	D. J. Augustin (5)	Visa Athletic Center; No in-person attendance	32–36
69	August 5	Toronto	L 99–109	Fournier, Ross (15)	Aaron Gordon (11)	Aaron Gordon (5)	Visa Athletic Center; No in-person attendance	32–37
70	August 7	@ Philadelphia	L 101–108	Evan Fournier (22)	Nikola Vučević (12)	D. J. Augustin (5)	HP Field House; No in-person attendance	32–38
71	August 9	@ Boston	L 119–122 (OT)	Nikola Vučević (26)	Nikola Vučević (11)	Markelle Fultz (10)	The Arena; No in-person attendance	32–39
72	August 11	Brooklyn	L 96–108	Fultz, Iwundu (18)	Nikola Vučević (10)	Augustin, Iwundu (3)	The Arena; No in-person attendance	32–40
73	August 13	New Orleans	W 133–127	Nikola Vučević (23)	Nikola Vučević (6)	Augustin, Iwundu (6)	Visa Athletic Center; No in-person attendance	33–40

Cancelled games

Game	Date	Team	Score	High points	High rebounds	High assists	Location Attendance	Record
66	March 12	Chicago					Amway Center	
67	March 15	Charlotte					Amway Center	
68	March 17	@ Detroit					Little Caesars Arena	
69	March 19	Cleveland					Amway Center	
70	March 21	Sacramento					Amway Center	
71	March 23	@ Brooklyn					Barclays Center	
72	March 25	Indiana					Amway Center	
73	March 27	Brooklyn					Amway Center	
74	March 29	New Orleans					Amway Center	
75	April 1	Charlotte					Amway Center	
76	April 3	@ Boston					TD Garden	
77	April 5	@ Philadelphia					Wells Fargo Center	
78	April 8	@ New York					Madison Square Garden	
79	April 10	Boston					Amway Center	
80	April 11	@ Indiana					Bankers Life Fieldhouse	
81	April 13	@ Chicago					United Center	
82	April 15	Toronto					Amway Center	

2019–20 season schedule

=== Playoffs ===
2020 playoff game log
First round: 1–4 (home: 0–2; road: 1–2)

Game	Date	Team	Score	High points	High rebounds	High assists	Location Attendance	Series
1	August 18	@ Milwaukee	W 122–110	Nikola Vučević (35)	Nikola Vučević (13)	D. J. Augustin (11)	HP Field House; No in-person attendance	1–0
2	August 20	@ Milwaukee	L 96–111	Nikola Vučević (32)	Ennis III, Vučević (10)	D. J. Augustin (5)	HP Field House; No in-person attendance	1–1
3	August 22	Milwaukee	L 107–121	D. J. Augustin (24)	Gary Clark (8)	D. J. Augustin (6)	HP Field House; No in-person attendance	1–2
4	August 24	Milwaukee	L 106–121	Nikola Vučević (31)	Nikola Vučević (11)	Fultz, Vučević (7)	HP Field House; No in-person attendance	1–3
5	August 29	@ Milwaukee	L 104–118	Nikola Vučević (22)	Nikola Vučević (15)	Fultz, Vučević (5)	The Arena; No in-person attendance	1–4

2020 playoff schedule

== Player statistics ==
=== Regular season ===
Player	POS	GP	GS	MP	REB	AST	STL	BLK	PTS	MPG	RPG	APG	SPG	BPG	PPG
Markelle Fultz	PG	72	60	1,996	238	369	90	11	870	27.7	3.3	5.1	1.3	.2	12.1
Terrence Ross	SG	69	0	1,889	222	82	77	24	1,016	27.4	3.2	1.2	1.1	.3	14.7
Evan Fournier	SF	66	66	2,076	171	209	71	15	1,221	31.5	2.6	3.2	1.1	.2	18.5
Aaron Gordon	PF	62	62	2,017	475	228	51	39	894	32.5	7.7	3.7	.8	.6	14.4
Nikola Vučević	C	62	62	1,998	673	222	54	47	1,215	32.2	10.9	3.6	.9	.8	19.6
Mo Bamba	C	62	0	878	302	42	23	86	332	14.2	4.9	.7	.4	1.4	5.4
D. J. Augustin	PG	57	13	1,420	122	262	34	1	599	24.9	2.1	4.6	.6	.0	10.5
Wes Iwundu	SF	52	21	953	131	60	25	13	300	18.3	2.5	1.2	.5	.3	5.8
Khem Birch	C	48	24	922	220	50	20	23	212	19.2	4.6	1.0	.4	.5	4.4
Michael Carter-Williams	SG	45	0	833	147	109	49	22	323	18.5	3.3	2.4	1.1	.5	7.2
Jonathan Isaac	PF	34	32	980	231	48	53	78	404	28.8	6.8	1.4	1.6	2.3	11.9
Gary Clark^{†}	SF	24	5	355	70	5	4	15	86	14.8	2.9	.2	.2	.6	3.6
James Ennis III^{†}	SG	20	18	489	95	22	12	8	169	24.5	4.8	1.1	.6	.4	8.5
Melvin Frazier	SG	19	0	126	10	3	9	2	40	6.6	.5	.2	.5	.1	2.1
Al-Farouq Aminu	PF	18	2	380	87	21	18	8	78	21.1	4.8	1.2	1.0	.4	4.3
Amile Jefferson	PF	18	0	74	23	4	1	3	15	4.1	1.3	.2	.1	.2	.8
B. J. Johnson	SF	10	0	83	15	3	3	0	30	8.3	1.5	.3	.3	.0	3.0
Vic Law	PF	8	0	62	11	3	2	0	15	7.8	1.4	.4	.3	.0	1.9
Josh Magette	PG	8	0	38	6	5	3	1	12	4.8	.8	.6	.4	.1	1.5

- ^{†} Denotes player spent time with another team in the season. Stats reflect time with the Magic only.

=== Playoffs ===
Player	POS	GP	GS	MP	REB	AST	STL	BLK	PTS	MPG	RPG	APG	SPG	BPG	PPG
Nikola Vučević	C	5	5	185	55	20	4	3	140	37.0	11.0	4.0	.8	.6	28.0
Evan Fournier	SF	5	5	171	20	13	6	3	64	34.2	4.0	2.6	1.2	.6	12.8
Markelle Fultz	PG	5	5	147	11	26	5	3	60	29.4	2.2	5.2	1.0	.6	12.0
Gary Clark	SF	5	5	144	28	7	5	2	37	28.8	5.6	1.4	1.0	.4	7.4
James Ennis III	SG	5	5	119	29	6	5	2	35	23.8	5.8	1.2	1.0	.4	7.0
Terrence Ross	SG	5	0	135	22	5	4	1	82	27.0	4.4	1.0	.8	.2	16.4
D. J. Augustin	PG	5	0	128	10	30	1	0	66	25.6	2.0	6.0	.2	.0	13.2
Khem Birch	C	5	0	89	25	7	1	0	24	17.8	5.0	1.4	.2	.0	4.8
Wes Iwundu	SF	5	0	76	11	4	3	2	21	15.2	2.2	.8	.6	.4	4.2
B. J. Johnson	SF	1	0	4	2	0	0	0	3	4.0	2.0	.0	.0	.0	3.0
Vic Law	PF	1	0	4	2	1	0	0	3	4.0	2.0	1.0	.0	.0	3.0

== Transactions ==
=== Free agents ===
==== Re-signed ====
Player	Date Signed	Contract	Ref.

==== Additions ====
Player	Signed	Contract	Former Team	Ref.

==== Subtractions ====
Player	Reason Left	New Team	Ref.
