= 2019–20 San Antonio Spurs season =

- Head coach: Gregg Popovich
- President: Gregg Popovich; Brent Barry (vice)
- General manager: Brian Wright
- Owners: Peter Holt
- Arena: AT&T Center

Results
- Record: 32–39 (.451)
- Place: Division: 4th (Southwest); Conference: 11th (Western)
- Playoff finish: Did not qualify
- Stats at Basketball Reference

Local media
- Television: Fox Sports Southwest, KENS, KMYS
- Radio: 1200 WOAI

The 2019–20 San Antonio Spurs season was the 53rd season of the franchise, its 44th in the National Basketball Association (NBA), and its 47th in the San Antonio area. For the first time since the 1996–97 season, the Spurs failed to qualify for the postseason when the Memphis Grizzlies defeated the Milwaukee Bucks on August 13, 2020, snapping their 22-year consecutive playoff streak and finishing with a losing record. This was only the second time under Gregg Popovich's tenure that the Spurs failed to make the playoffs. After their 22-year playoff streak was snapped, the Pittsburgh Penguins of the National Hockey League owned the longest active playoff streak in any major North American sports league making the playoffs every year from 2006–07 to 2021-22. The Houston Rockets held the longest active playoff streak in the NBA, making the playoffs every year from 2012–13 to 2020–21.

The season was suspended by the league officials following the games of March 11 after it was reported that Rudy Gobert tested positive for COVID-19.

On June 4, the Spurs were one of 22 teams invited to the NBA Bubble.

== Season synopsis ==
Before the season, Ettore Messina left the Spurs' coaching staff. The staff was joined by onetime Spurs superstar Tim Duncan.

The Spurs retired the number nine jersey of onetime Spurs point guard Tony Parker at the AT&T Center on November 10, 2019, prior to a home game against the Memphis Grizzlies.

From November 9–20, 2019, the Spurs suffered their first seven-game losing streak since 1996–97. (The 1996–97 season was Gregg Popovich's first year as Spurs head coach, is the most recent season in which the Spurs finished with a losing record, and is the most recent season in which the Spurs failed to make the NBA playoffs.)

== Draft ==
The Spurs held two first-round draft picks in the 2019 draft, including the 29th pick they obtained from Toronto in the Kawhi Leonard-DeMar DeRozan trade in 2018. They also held a second-round draft pick.

Round	Pick	Player	Position	Nationality	School/Club
1	19	Luka Šamanić	PF	Croatia	KK Olimpija
1	29	Keldon Johnson	SG/SF	United States	Kentucky
2	49	Quinndary Weatherspoon	PG/SG	United States	Mississippi State

== Roster ==
2019–20 San Antonio Spurs roster
Players

Pos.	No.	Player	Height	Weight	DOB	From
PF/C	12	LaMarcus Aldridge	6 ft 11 in (2.11 m)	260 lb (118 kg)	1985–07–19	Texas
SG	18	Marco Belinelli	6 ft 5 in (1.96 m)	210 lb (95 kg)	1986–03–25	Italy
SF	10	DeMar DeRozan	6 ft 7 in (2.01 m)	220 lb (100 kg)	1989–08–07	USC
C	14	Drew Eubanks (TW)	6 ft 11 in (2.11 m)	250 lb (113 kg)	1997–02–01	Oregon State
PG	11	Bryn Forbes	6 ft 2 in (1.88 m)	190 lb (86 kg)	1993–07–23	Michigan State
PF	22	Rudy Gay	6 ft 9 in (2.06 m)	250 lb (113 kg)	1986–08–17	Connecticut
SG	3	Keldon Johnson	6 ft 4 in (1.93 m)	190 lb (86 kg)	1999–10–11	Kentucky
PF	41	Trey Lyles	6 ft 10 in (2.08 m)	234 lb (106 kg)	1995–11–05	Kentucky
PF	7	Chimezie Metu	6 ft 11 in (2.11 m)	225 lb (102 kg)	1997–03–22	USC
PG	8	Patty Mills	6 ft 1 in (1.85 m)	180 lb (82 kg)	1988–08–11	Saint Mary's
SG	5	Dejounte Murray	6 ft 4 in (1.93 m)	170 lb (77 kg)	1996–09–19	Washington
C	25	Jakob Pöltl	7 ft 1 in (2.16 m)	245 lb (111 kg)	1995–10–15	Utah
PF	19	Luka Šamanić	6 ft 11 in (2.11 m)	227 lb (103 kg)	2000–01–09	Croatia
SG	1	Lonnie Walker	6 ft 4 in (1.93 m)	205 lb (93 kg)	1998–12–14	Miami (FL)
SG	15	Quinndary Weatherspoon (TW)	6 ft 4 in (1.93 m)	207 lb (94 kg)	1996–09–10	Mississippi State
PG	4	Derrick White	6 ft 4 in (1.93 m)	190 lb (86 kg)	1994–07–02	Colorado
C	45	Tyler Zeller	7 ft 0 in (2.13 m)	255 lb (116 kg)	1990–01–17	North Carolina

Coaches
Head coach
- Gregg Popovich
Assistant(s)
- Tim Duncan
- Chip Engelland
- Becky Hammon
- Will Hardy
- Mitch Johnson

Legend
- (DP) Unsigned draft pick
- (FA) Free agent
- (S) Suspended
- (GL) On assignment to G League affiliate
- (TW) Two-way affiliate player
- Injured

Roster
Updated: 2024–12–05

== Standings ==
=== Division ===
Southwest Division	W	L	PCT	GB	Home	Road	Div	GP
y – Houston Rockets	44	28	.611	–	24‍–‍12	20‍–‍16	8–5	72
x – Dallas Mavericks	43	32	.573	2.5	20‍–‍18	23‍–‍14	10–4	75
pi – Memphis Grizzlies	34	39	.466	10.5	20‍–‍17	14‍–‍22	4–9	73
San Antonio Spurs	32	39	.451	11.5	19‍–‍15	13‍–‍24	7–6	71
New Orleans Pelicans	30	42	.417	14.0	15‍–‍21	15‍–‍21	4–9	72

=== Conference ===
Western Conference
#	Team	W	L	PCT	GB	GP
1	c – Los Angeles Lakers *	52	19	.732	–	71
2	x – Los Angeles Clippers	49	23	.681	3.5	72
3	y – Denver Nuggets *	46	27	.630	7.0	73
4	y – Houston Rockets *	44	28	.611	8.5	72
5	x – Oklahoma City Thunder	44	28	.611	8.5	72
6	x – Utah Jazz	44	28	.611	8.5	72
7	x – Dallas Mavericks	43	32	.573	11.0	75
8	x – Portland Trail Blazers	35	39	.473	18.5	74
9	pi – Memphis Grizzlies	34	39	.466	19.0	73
10	Phoenix Suns	34	39	.466	19.0	73
11	San Antonio Spurs	32	39	.451	20.0	71
12	Sacramento Kings	31	41	.431	21.5	72
13	New Orleans Pelicans	30	42	.417	22.5	72
14	Minnesota Timberwolves	19	45	.297	29.5	64
15	Golden State Warriors	15	50	.231	34.0	65

== Game log ==
=== Preseason ===
The entire preseason schedule was released on July 22, 2019.

2019 preseason game log
Total: 2–3 (Home: 1–2; Road: 1–1)
Preseason: 2–3 (home: 1–2; road: 1–1)

Game	Date	Team	Score	High points	High rebounds	High assists	Location Attendance	Record
1	October 5	Orlando	L 89–125	Bryn Forbes (24)	Rudy Gay (6)	Derrick White (6)	AT&T Center; 14,123	0–1
2	October 8	@ Miami	L 89–107	Rudy Gay (12)	Jakob Pöltl (5)	Murray, DeRozan (3)	AmericanAirlines Arena; 19,600	0–2
3	October 13	New Orleans	L 114–123	Bryn Forbes (18)	Jakob Pöltl (7)	Patty Mills (6)	AT&T Center; 12,101	0–3
4	October 16	@ Houston	W 128–114	LaMarcus Aldridge (22)	DeMarre Carroll (7)	Jakob Pöltl (5)	Toyota Center; 17,283	1–3
5	October 18	Memphis	W 104–91	Patty Mills (16)	LaMarcus Aldridge (11)	DeMar DeRozan (5)	AT&T Center; 12,664	2–3

2019–20 season schedule

=== Regular season ===
2019–20 game log
Total: 32–39 (Home: 19–15; Road: 13–24)
October: 3–1 (home: 3–0; road: 0–1)

Game	Date	Team	Score	High points	High rebounds	High assists	Location Attendance	Record
1	October 23	New York	W 120–111	LaMarcus Aldridge (22)	Trey Lyles (11)	Dejounte Murray (6)	AT&T Center; 18,354	1–0
2	October 26	Washington	W 124–122	LaMarcus Aldridge (27)	Dejounte Murray (10)	Poeltl, Murray (4)	AT&T Center; 18,354	2–0
3	October 28	Portland	W 113–110	DeMar DeRozan (27)	Trey Lyles (8)	Dejounte Murray (8)	AT&T Center; 18,083	3–0
4	October 31	@ L. A. Clippers	L 97–103	DeMar DeRozan (29)	Rudy Gay (12)	Rudy Gay (4)	Staples Center; 19,068	3–1

November: 4–12 (home: 2–6; road: 2–6)

Game	Date	Team	Score	High points	High rebounds	High assists	Location Attendance	Record
5	November 1	@ Golden State	W 127–110	Patty Mills (31)	Trey Lyles (14)	DeMar DeRozan (11)	Chase Center; 18,064	4–1
6	November 3	L. A. Lakers	L 96–103	Dejounte Murray (18)	Dejounte Murray (11)	DeMar DeRozan (5)	AT&T Center; 18,610	4–2
7	November 5	@ Atlanta	L 100–108	DeMar DeRozan (22)	Trey Lyles (12)	Aldridge, DeRozan, Murray (4)	State Farm Arena; 14,025	4–3
8	November 7	Oklahoma City	W 121–112	LaMarcus Aldridge (39)	Dejounte Murray (8)	Dejounte Murray (10)	AT&T Center; 18,354	5–3
9	November 9	Boston	L 115–135	DeMar DeRozan (22)	Lyles, Metu (8)	DeRozan, Murray (4)	AT&T Center; 18,354	5–4
10	November 11	Memphis	L 109–113	LaMarcus Aldridge (19)	Rudy Gay (8)	DeMar DeRozan (7)	AT&T Center; 18,627	5–5
11	November 13	@ Minnesota	L 114–129	DeMar DeRozan (27)	Trey Lyles (11)	DeRozan, White (4)	Target Center; 11,581	5–6
12	November 15	@ Orlando	L 109–111	DeMar DeRozan (21)	Trey Lyles (12)	Dejounte Murray (6)	Amway Center; 16,296	5–7
13	November 16	Portland	L 116–121	LaMarcus Aldridge (30)	LaMarcus Aldridge (13)	DeRozan, White, Mills (5)	AT&T Center; 18,534	5–8
14	November 18	@ Dallas	L 110–117	DeMar DeRozan (36)	Jakob Poeltl (10)	DeMar DeRozan (4)	American Airlines Center; 19,637	5–9
15	November 20	@ Washington	L 132–138	DeMar DeRozan (31)	LaMarcus Aldridge (10)	Bryn Forbes (7)	Capital One Arena; 14,579	5–10
16	November 22	@ Philadelphia	L 104–115	DeMar DeRozan (29)	DeMar DeRozan (7)	Mills, Murray (4)	Wells Fargo Center; 20,927	5–11
17	November 23	@ New York	W 111–104	LaMarcus Aldridge (23)	Jakob Poeltl (10)	Derrick White (5)	Madison Square Garden; 19,320	6–11
18	November 25	L. A. Lakers	L 104–114	LaMarcus Aldridge (30)	Poeltl, Murray (8)	DeRozan, Forbes (5)	AT&T Center; 18,498	6–12
19	November 27	Minnesota	L 101–113	LaMarcus Aldridge (22)	Rudy Gay (11)	Derrick White (6)	AT&T Center; 18,354	6–13
20	November 29	L. A. Clippers	W 107–97	White, Aldridge (17)	DeMar DeRozan (9)	LaMarcus Aldridge (7)	AT&T Center; 18,354	7–13

December: 7–5 (home: 5–2; road: 2–3)

Game	Date	Team	Score	High points	High rebounds	High assists	Location Attendance	Record
21	December 1	@ Detroit	L 98–132	DeMar DeRozan (20)	Drew Eubanks (8)	Dejounte Murray (6)	Little Caesars Arena; 14,270	7–14
22	December 3	Houston	W 135–133 (2OT)	Lonnie Walker (28)	Jakob Poeltl (15)	DeMar DeRozan (9)	AT&T Center; 18,354	8–14
23	December 6	Sacramento	W 105–104 (OT)	LaMarcus Aldridge (19)	LaMarcus Aldridge (13)	DeMar DeRozan (7)	AT&T Center; 18,354	9–14
24	December 12	Cleveland	L 109–117 (OT)	DeMar DeRozan (21)	LaMarcus Aldridge (10)	DeRozan, Murray (4)	AT&T Center; 18,354	9–15
25	December 14	@ Phoenix	W 121–119 (OT)	Patty Mills (26)	Jakob Poeltl (11)	Dejounte Murray (5)	Mexico City Arena; 20,013	10–15
26	December 16	@ Houston	L 107–109	LaMarcus Aldridge (19)	LaMarcus Aldridge (13)	DeMar DeRozan (5)	Toyota Center; 18,055	10–16
27	December 19	Brooklyn	W 118–105	Patty Mills (27)	LaMarcus Aldridge (10)	DeMar DeRozan (6)	AT&T Center; 18,354	11–16
28	December 21	L. A. Clippers	L 109–134	DeMar DeRozan (24)	Gay, Murray, Poeltl (5)	Dejounte Murray (6)	AT&T Center; 18,354	11–17
29	December 23	@ Memphis	W 145–115	LaMarcus Aldridge (40)	LaMarcus Aldridge (9)	DeMar DeRozan (10)	FedExForum; 16,776	12–17
30	December 26	@ Dallas	L 98–102	DeMar DeRozan (21)	Rudy Gay (8)	Derrick White (6)	American Airlines Center; 20,427	12–18
31	December 28	Detroit	W 136–109	DeMar DeRozan (29)	LaMarcus Aldridge (12)	DeMar DeRozan (8)	AT&T Center; 18,524	13–18
32	December 31	Golden State	W 117–113 (OT)	DeMar DeRozan (24)	LaMarcus Aldridge (12)	Dejounte Murray (5)	AT&T Center; 18,354	14–18

January: 7–8 (home: 3–4; road: 4–4)

Game	Date	Team	Score	High points	High rebounds	High assists	Location Attendance	Record
33	January 2	Oklahoma City	L 103–109	DeMar DeRozan (30)	LaMarcus Aldridge (11)	Derrick White (5)	AT&T Center; 18,354	14–19
34	January 4	@ Milwaukee	L 118–127	DeMar DeRozan (26)	Trey Lyles (14)	DeMar DeRozan (5)	Fiserv Forum; 18,002	14–20
35	January 6	Milwaukee	W 126–104	DeMar DeRozan (25)	Trey Lyles (12)	DeMar DeRozan (7)	AT&T Center; 18,354	15–20
36	January 8	@ Boston	W 129–114	DeMar DeRozan (30)	Jakob Poeltl (8)	Bryn Forbes (6)	TD Garden; 19,156	16–20
37	January 10	@ Memphis	L 121–134	DeMar DeRozan (36)	Aldridge, DeRozan (9)	DeMar DeRozan (9)	FedExForum; 16,448	16–21
38	January 12	@ Toronto	W 105–104	DeMar DeRozan (25)	Jakob Poeltl (10)	Aldridge, DeRozan, White, Murray (4)	Scotiabank Arena; 19,800	17–21
39	January 15	@ Miami	L 100–106	DeMar DeRozan (30)	Lyles, Murray (7)	DeMar DeRozan (7)	American Airlines Arena; 19,704	17–22
40	January 17	Atlanta	L 120–121	LaMarcus Aldridge (30)	Dejounte Murray (12)	DeMar DeRozan (9)	AT&T Center; 18,354	17–23
41	January 19	Miami	W 107–102	LaMarcus Aldridge (21)	DeMar DeRozan (9)	DeMar DeRozan (9)	AT&T Center; 18,422	18–23
42	January 20	@ Phoenix	W 120–118	Derrick White (25)	DeMar DeRozan (9)	DeMar DeRozan (8)	Talking Stick Resort Arena; 14,847	19–23
43	January 22	@ New Orleans	W 121–117	LaMarcus Aldridge (32)	LaMarcus Aldridge (14)	Derrick White (7)	Smoothie King Center; 18,365	20–23
44	January 24	Phoenix	L 99–103	DeMar DeRozan (30)	DeRozan, Lyles (8)	DeRozan, White (4)	AT&T Center; 18,354	20–24
45	January 26	Toronto	L 106–110	DeRozan, White (14)	LaMarcus Aldridge (10)	DeMar DeRozan (7)	AT&T Center; 18,354	20–25
46	January 27	@ Chicago	L 109–110	DeMar DeRozan (36)	Jakob Poeltl (13)	Bryn Forbes (5)	United Center; 16,071	20–26
47	January 29	Utah	W 127–120	DeMar DeRozan (38)	Jakob Poeltl (8)	DeRozan, Poeltl (5)	AT&T Center; 18,778	21–26

February: 4–7 (home: 2–1; road: 2–6)

Game	Date	Team	Score	High points	High rebounds	High assists	Location Attendance	Record
48	February 1	Charlotte	W 114–90	DeMar DeRozan (24)	Dejounte Murray (10)	DeMar DeRozan (6)	AT&T Center; 18,615	22–26
49	February 3	@ L. A. Clippers	L 105–108	LaMarcus Aldridge (27)	LaMarcus Aldridge (9)	Derrick White (6)	Staples Center; 19,068	22–27
50	February 4	@ L. A. Lakers	L 102–129	DeMar DeRozan (28)	DeMar DeRozan (9)	DeMar DeRozan (7)	Staples Center; 18,997	22–28
51	February 6	@ Portland	L 117–125	Trey Lyles (23)	Trey Lyles (10)	DeMar DeRozan (6)	Moda Center; 19,653	22–29
52	February 8	@ Sacramento	L 102–122	Dejounte Murray (17)	LaMarcus Aldridge (10)	Dejounte Murray (9)	Golden 1 Center; 16,756	22–30
53	February 10	@ Denver	L 120–127	LaMarcus Aldridge (33)	Trey Lyles (7)	Dejounte Murray (9)	Pepsi Center; 19,520	22–31
54	February 11	@ Oklahoma City	W 114–106	Aldridge, Murray (25)	LaMarcus Aldridge (14)	Derrick White (8)	Chesapeake Energy Arena; 18,203	23–31
55	February 21	@ Utah	W 113–104	Dejounte Murray (23)	LaMarcus Aldridge (8)	DeMar DeRozan (7)	Vivint Smart Home Arena; 18,306	24–31
56	February 23	@ Oklahoma City	L 103–131	Rudy Gay (14)	Rudy Gay (6)	Dejounte Murray (7)	Chesapeake Energy Arena; 18,203	24–32
57	February 26	Dallas	L 103–109	DeMar DeRozan (27)	Trey Lyles (9)	DeMar DeRozan (9)	AT&T Center; 18,354	24–33
58	February 29	Orlando	W 114–113	Trey Lyles (20)	Trey Lyles (9)	DeMar DeRozan (9)	AT&T Center; 18,354	25–33

March: 2–3 (home: 1–1; road: 1–2)

Game	Date	Team	Score	High points	High rebounds	High assists	Location Attendance	Record
59	March 2	Indiana	L 111–116	Patty Mills (24)	Dejounte Murray (7)	DeMar DeRozan (7)	AT&T Center; 17,635	25–34
60	March 3	@ Charlotte	W 104–103	Dejounte Murray (21)	Rudy Gay (7)	DeMar DeRozan (10)	Spectrum Center; 12,008	26–34
61	March 6	@ Brooklyn	L 120–139	DeMar DeRozan (24)	Gay, Murray (6)	DeMar DeRozan (9)	Barclays Center; 16,277	26–35
62	March 8	@ Cleveland	L 129–132 (OT)	DeMar DeRozan (25)	Gay, Lyles (9)	Dejounte Murray (6)	Rocket Mortgage FieldHouse; 17,995	26–36
63	March 10	Dallas	W 119–109	LaMarcus Aldridge (24)	Trey Lyles (11)	DeMar DeRozan (12)	AT&T Center; 18,354	27–36

Seeding games: 5–3 (home: 3–1; road: 2–2)

Game	Date	Team	Score	High points	High rebounds	High assists	Location Attendance	Record
64	July 31	Sacramento	W 129–120	DeMar DeRozan (27)	Gay, White (8)	DeMar DeRozan (10)	Visa Athletic Center; No In-Person Attendance	28–36
65	August 2	@ Memphis	W 108–106	Dejounte Murray (21)	Dejounte Murray (10)	DeRozan, White (7)	Visa Athletic Center; No In-Person Attendance	29–36
66	August 3	@ Philadelphia	L 130–132	DeMar DeRozan (30)	Drew Eubanks (10)	Jakob Pöltl (4)	Visa Athletic Center; No In-Person Attendance	29–37
67	August 5	Denver	L 126–132	Rudy Gay (24)	Jakob Pöltl (7)	DeMar DeRozan (8)	Visa Athletic Center; No In-Person Attendance	29–38
68	August 7	Utah	W 119–111	Derrick White (24)	Jakob Pöltl (10)	Dejounte Murray (6)	HP Field House; No In-Person Attendance	30–38
69	August 9	@ New Orleans	W 122–113	DeMar DeRozan (27)	Jakob Pöltl (14)	Lonnie Walker (4)	HP Field House; No In-Person Attendance	31–38
70	August 11	Houston	W 123–105	Keldon Johnson (24)	Jakob Pöltl (12)	Dejounte Murray (7)	HP Field House; No In-Person Attendance	32–38
71	August 13	@ Utah	L 112–118	Keldon Johnson (20)	Dejounte Murray (14)	Dejounte Murray (7)	HP Field House; No In-Person Attendance	32–39

Cancelled games

Game	Date	Team	Score	High points	High rebounds	High assists	Location Attendance	Record
64	March 13	Denver					AT&T Center	
65	March 14	Minnesota					AT&T Center	
66	March 16	Memphis					AT&T Center	
67	March 18	@ New Orleans					Smoothie King Center	
68	March 20	Chicago					AT&T Center	
69	March 22	Utah					AT&T Center	
70	March 24	@ Utah					Vivint Smart Home Arena	
71	March 26	@ Minnesota					Target Center	
72	March 27	@ Denver					Pepsi Center	
73	March 29	@ Golden State					Chase Center	
74	March 31	@ Sacramento					Golden 1 Center	
75	April 3	Golden State					AT&T Center	
76	April 5	New Orleans					AT&T Center	
77	April 7	Sacramento					AT&T Center	
78	April 8	@ Houston					Toyota Center	
79	April 10	Philadelphia					AT&T Center	
80	April 12	Houston					AT&T Center	
81	April 13	@ Indiana					Bankers Life Fieldhouse	
82	April 15	New Orleans					AT&T Center	

2019–20 season schedule

== Player statistics ==
Legend
GP	Games played	GS	Games started	MPG	Minutes per game
FG%	Field-goal percentage	3P%	3-point field-goal percentage	FT%	Free-throw percentage
RPG	Rebounds per game	APG	Assists per game	SPG	Steals per game
BPG	Blocks per game	PPG	Points per game

=== Regular season ===
San Antonio Spurs statistics
Player	GP	GS	MPG	FG%	3P%	FT%	RPG	APG	SPG	BPG	PPG
DeMar DeRozan	68	68	34.1	.531	.257	.845	5.5	5.6	1.0	.3	22.1
Derrick White	68	20	24.7	.458	.366	.853	3.3	3.5	.6	.9	11.3
Rudy Gay	67	5	21.8	.446	.336	.882	5.4	1.7	.5	.5	10.8
Dejounte Murray	66	58	25.6	.462	.369	.798	5.8	4.1	1.7	.3	10.9
Jakob Pöltl	66	18	17.7	.624		.465	5.7	1.8	.6	1.4	5.6
Patty Mills	66	1	22.5	.431	.382	.866	1.6	1.8	.8	.1	11.6
Bryn Forbes	63	62	25.1	.417	.388	.833	2.0	1.7	.5	.0	11.2
Trey Lyles	63	53	20.2	.446	.387	.733	5.7	1.1	.4	.4	6.4
Lonnie Walker IV	61	12	16.2	.426	.406	.721	2.3	1.1	.5	.2	6.4
Marco Belinelli	57	0	15.5	.392	.376	.828	1.7	1.2	.2	.0	6.3
LaMarcus Aldridge	53	53	33.1	.493	.389	.827	7.4	2.4	.7	1.6	18.9
Drew Eubanks	22	3	12.4	.642	1.000	.769	3.9	.7	.2	.8	4.9
Chimezie Metu	18	0	5.8	.571	.000	.769	1.8	.6	.2	.3	3.2
Keldon Johnson	17	1	17.7	.596	.591	.795	3.4	.9	.8	.1	9.1
DeMarre Carroll^{†}	15	0	9.0	.310	.231	.600	2.1	.7	.1	.1	2.2
Quinndary Weatherspoon	11	0	7.1	.294	.200	.500	.6	1.0	.3	.1	1.1
Luka Šamanić	3	1	16.0	.313	.375	.750	3.3	2.0	.0	.7	5.3
Tyler Zeller	2	0	2.0	.250			2.0	.0	.0	.0	1.0

- ^{†} Denotes player spent time with another team in the season. Stats reflect time with the Spurs only.

== Transactions ==
=== Free agency ===
==== Re-signed ====
Player	Signed
Rudy Gay	2 years, $32 million
Drew Eubanks	Two-way contract

==== Additions ====
Player	Signed	Former team
DeMarre Carroll	3-year contract worth $21 million via sign-and-trade deal	Brooklyn Nets
Trey Lyles	2-year contract worth $11 million	Denver Nuggets

==== Subtractions ====
Player	Reason left	New team
Dāvis Bertāns	Trade	Washington Wizards
Dante Cunningham	Unrestricted free agent	
Ben Moore	Unrestricted free agent	Fort Wayne Mad Ants
Donatas Motiejūnas	Unrestricted free agent	Shanghai Sharks
Quincy Pondexter	Unrestricted free agent	
