= 2019–20 Memphis Grizzlies season =

- Head coach: Taylor Jenkins
- General manager: Jason Wexler
- Owners: Robert Pera
- Arena: FedExForum

Results
- Record: 34–39 (.466)
- Place: Division: 3rd (Southwest); Conference: 9th (Western)
- Playoff finish: Did not qualify
- Stats at Basketball Reference

Local media
- Television: Fox Sports Tennessee; Fox Sports Southeast
- Radio: WMFS-FM

The 2019–20 Memphis Grizzlies season was the 25th season of the franchise in the National Basketball Association (NBA) and 19th in Memphis.

After the end of the 2018–19 season, and prior to the beginning of the 2019–20 season, Robert Pera announced a restructuring of the Grizzlies' basketball operations department: "In order to put our team on the path to sustainable success, it was necessary to change our approach to basketball operations".

On April 11, 2019, the Grizzlies fired head coach J. B. Bickerstaff after missing the playoffs. Additionally, general manager Chris Wallace was reallocated to a role exclusively in player scouting. Jason Wexler was announced as team president and Zachary Kleiman was promoted to general manager, as the executive vice president of basketball operations.

On May 14, during the 2019 NBA Draft Lottery, the Grizzlies not only kept their first round selection this year, but rose up to the #2 pick in the process. The Grizzlies later found their new head coach on June 11 with Milwaukee Bucks assistant coach Taylor Jenkins. On June 19, 2019, it was announced that longtime point guard Mike Conley would be traded to the Utah Jazz after spending his first 12 years in the league with the Grizzlies. It was for the first time since the 2006–07 season that Conley was not with the Grizzlies.

The Grizzlies selected Ja Morant as the second pick in the 2019 NBA draft, who became their point guard of the future. Morant was named the NBA Rookie of the Year following an impressive first season in Memphis.

The season was suspended by the league officials following the games of March 11 after it was reported that Rudy Gobert tested positive for COVID-19. On June 4, the Grizzlies were one of the 22 teams invited to the NBA Bubble. On August 15, they fell to the Portland Trail Blazers in the league's first ever play-in game to end the season.

== Draft ==
Round	Pick	Player	Position	Nationality	College/Club
1	2	Ja Morant	PG	United States	Murray State

The Memphis Grizzlies held a first-round pick for the 2019 NBA Draft that coming into it had possible lottery implications. Before the night of the NBA draft lottery, the Grizzlies risked losing the selection if it fell outside of the top 8 due to a prior trade with the Boston Celtics. However, their sole first-round pick rose up six spots in the draft to go from the already safe #8 selection to the second overall pick of the draft. On the night before the 2019 NBA draft began, the Grizzlies agreed to trade mainstay Mike Conley to the Utah Jazz in exchange for Grayson Allen, Jae Crowder, Kyle Korver, a future first-round pick, and the Jazz's first-round pick that year at #23, although the trade would not be completed until July 6 due to salary cap reasons.

With the second pick of the draft, the Grizzlies selected point guard Ja Morant from Murray State University. The Grizzlies also received Canadian power forward Brandon Clarke after he was selected by the Oklahoma City Thunder out of Gonzaga with the 21st pick and immediately traded to the Grizzlies for the 23rd pick (via the Utah Jazz), and the Grizzlies' 2024 second-round pick.

== Roster ==
2019–20 Memphis Grizzlies roster
Players

Pos.	No.	Player	Height	Weight	DOB	From
G	3	Grayson Allen	6 ft 4 in (1.93 m)	198 lb (90 kg)	1995–10–08	Duke
G/F	1	Kyle Anderson	6 ft 9 in (2.06 m)	230 lb (104 kg)	1993–09–20	UCLA
G/F	24	Dillon Brooks	6 ft 7 in (2.01 m)	225 lb (102 kg)	1996–01–22	Oregon
G/F	15	Brandon Clarke	6 ft 8 in (2.03 m)	215 lb (98 kg)	1996–09–19	Gonzaga
C	14	Gorgui Dieng	6 ft 11 in (2.11 m)	252 lb (114 kg)	1990–01–18	Louisville
G	23	Marko Gudurić	6 ft 6 in (1.98 m)	201 lb (91 kg)	1995–03–08	Serbia
F/C	13	Jaren Jackson (injured)	6 ft 11 in (2.11 m)	242 lb (110 kg)	1999–09–15	Michigan State
G/F	20	Josh Jackson	6 ft 8 in (2.03 m)	207 lb (94 kg)	1997–02–10	Kansas
G	21	Tyus Jones	6 ft 0 in (1.83 m)	196 lb (89 kg)	1996–05–10	Duke
G	46	John Konchar (TW)	6 ft 5 in (1.96 m)	210 lb (95 kg)	1996–03–22	Purdue Fort Wayne
G	0	De'Anthony Melton	6 ft 2 in (1.88 m)	200 lb (91 kg)	1998–05–28	USC
G	12	Ja Morant	6 ft 3 in (1.91 m)	174 lb (79 kg)	1999–08–10	Murray State
F/C	–	Jontay Porter (injured)	6 ft 11 in (2.11 m)	240 lb (109 kg)	1999–11–15	Missouri
F	44	Anthony Tolliver	6 ft 8 in (2.03 m)	240 lb (109 kg)	1985–06–01	Creighton
C	17	Jonas Valančiūnas	7 ft 0 in (2.13 m)	265 lb (120 kg)	1992–05–06	Lithuania
G/F	18	Yuta Watanabe (TW)	6 ft 8 in (2.03 m)	215 lb (98 kg)	1994–10–13	George Washington
G/F	7	Justise Winslow (injured)	6 ft 6 in (1.98 m)	222 lb (101 kg)	1996–03–26	Duke

Coaches
Head coach
- Taylor Jenkins
Assistant(s)
- Neven Spahija
- Brad Jones
- David McClure
- Scoonie Penn
- Vitaly Potapenko
- Niele Ivey

Legend
- (DP) Unsigned draft pick
- (FA) Free agent
- (S) Suspended
- (GL) On assignment to G League affiliate
- (TW) Two-way affiliate player
- Injured

Roster
Updated: 2020–09–13

== Standings ==
=== Division ===
Southwest Division	W	L	PCT	GB	Home	Road	Div	GP
y – Houston Rockets	44	28	.611	–	24‍–‍12	20‍–‍16	8–5	72
x – Dallas Mavericks	43	32	.573	2.5	20‍–‍18	23‍–‍14	10–4	75
pi – Memphis Grizzlies	34	39	.466	10.5	20‍–‍17	14‍–‍22	4–9	73
San Antonio Spurs	32	39	.451	11.5	19‍–‍15	13‍–‍24	7–6	71
New Orleans Pelicans	30	42	.417	14.0	15‍–‍21	15‍–‍21	4–9	72

=== Conference ===
Western Conference
#	Team	W	L	PCT	GB	GP
1	c – Los Angeles Lakers *	52	19	.732	–	71
2	x – Los Angeles Clippers	49	23	.681	3.5	72
3	y – Denver Nuggets *	46	27	.630	7.0	73
4	y – Houston Rockets *	44	28	.611	8.5	72
5	x – Oklahoma City Thunder	44	28	.611	8.5	72
6	x – Utah Jazz	44	28	.611	8.5	72
7	x – Dallas Mavericks	43	32	.573	11.0	75
8	x – Portland Trail Blazers	35	39	.473	18.5	74
9	pi – Memphis Grizzlies	34	39	.466	19.0	73
10	Phoenix Suns	34	39	.466	19.0	73
11	San Antonio Spurs	32	39	.451	20.0	71
12	Sacramento Kings	31	41	.431	21.5	72
13	New Orleans Pelicans	30	42	.417	22.5	72
14	Minnesota Timberwolves	19	45	.297	29.5	64
15	Golden State Warriors	15	50	.231	34.0	65

== Game log ==
=== Preseason ===
2019 preseason game log
Total: 3–2 (Home: 2–1; Road: 1–1)
Preseason: 3–2 (home: 2–1; road: 1–1)

Game	Date	Team	Score	High points	High rebounds	High assists	Location Attendance	Record
1	October 6	Haifa	W 123–88	Jaren Jackson Jr. (19)	Bruno Caboclo (9)	Jones, Morant (7)	FedExForum; 10,515	1–0
2	October 8	New Zealand	W 108–94	Allen, Jackson Jr. (18)	Brandon Clarke (12)	Ja Morant (10)	FedExForum; 10,259	2–0
3	October 14	Charlotte	L 99–120	Brandon Clarke (16)	Brandon Clarke (12)	Ja Morant (6)	FedExForum; 11,292	2–1
4	October 16	@ Oklahoma City	W 124–119	Dillon Brooks (30)	Jackson Jr., Konchar (10)	Kyle Anderson (5)	Chesapeake Energy Arena; 1,000	3–1
5	October 18	@ San Antonio	L 91–104	Ja Morant (16)	Caboclo, Crowder (11)	Ja Morant (6)	AT&T Center; 12,664	3–2

2019–20 season schedule

=== Regular season ===
2019–20 game log
Total: 34–39 (Home: 20–17; Road: 14–22)
October: 1–3 (home: 1–1; road: 0–2)

Game	Date	Team	Score	High points	High rebounds	High assists	Location Attendance	Record
1	October 23	@ Miami	L 101–120	Jaren Jackson Jr. (17)	Brandon Clarke (7)	Tyus Jones (7)	American Airlines Arena; 19,600	0–1
2	October 25	Chicago	L 102–110	Jaren Jackson Jr. (23)	Jonas Valančiūnas (13)	Anderson, Morant (5)	FedExForum; 17,794	0–2
3	October 27	Brooklyn	W 134–133 (OT)	Ja Morant (30)	Jonas Valančiūnas (11)	Ja Morant (9)	FedExForum; 15,517	1–2
4	October 29	@ L. A. Lakers	L 91–120	Ja Morant (16)	Jonas Valančiūnas (11)	Dillon Brooks (4)	Staples Center; 18,997	1–3

November: 4–10 (home: 2–8; road: 2–2)

Game	Date	Team	Score	High points	High rebounds	High assists	Location Attendance	Record
5	November 2	Phoenix	L 105–114	Ja Morant (24)	Brandon Clarke (11)	Ja Morant (7)	FedExForum; 14,144	1–4
6	November 4	Houston	L 100–107	Ja Morant (23)	Jonas Valančiūnas (10)	Ja Morant (6)	FedExForum; 14,197	1–5
7	November 6	Minnesota	W 137–121	Dillon Brooks (31)	Jonas Valančiūnas (14)	Tyus Jones (5)	FedExForum; 13,503	2–5
8	November 8	@ Orlando	L 86–118	Jonas Valančiūnas (15)	Jonas Valančiūnas (9)	Ja Morant (7)	Amway Center; 17,021	2–6
9	November 9	Dallas	L 122–138	Jaren Jackson Jr. (23)	Hill, Anderson, Brooks (5)	Tyus Jones (8)	FedExForum; 15,753	2–7
10	November 11	@ San Antonio	W 113–109	Jaren Jackson Jr. (24)	Jonas Valančiūnas (12)	Tyus Jones (6)	AT&T Center; 18,627	3–7
11	November 13	@ Charlotte	W 119–117	Ja Morant (23)	Jonas Valančiūnas (13)	Ja Morant (11)	Spectrum Center; 13,155	4–7
12	November 15	Utah	W 107–106	Ja Morant (25)	Jae Crowder (10)	Ja Morant (8)	FedExForum; 16,422	5–7
13	November 17	Denver	L 114–131	Jaren Jackson Jr. (22)	Jonas Valančiūnas (10)	Tyus Jones (7)	FedExForum; 14,227	5–8
14	November 19	Golden State	L 95–114	Ja Morant (20)	Jae Crowder (11)	Ja Morant (6)	FedExForum; 14,511	5–9
15	November 23	L. A. Lakers	L 108–109	Ja Morant (26)	Brandon Clarke (11)	Jones, Morant (6)	FedExForum; 17,794	5–10
16	November 25	@ Indiana	L 114–126	Jaren Jackson Jr. (28)	Jonas Valančiūnas (11)	Ja Morant (10)	Bankers Life Fieldhouse; 15,141	5–11
17	November 27	L. A. Clippers	L 119–121	Jonas Valančiūnas (30)	Jonas Valančiūnas (16)	Ja Morant (11)	FedExForum; 16,721	5–12
18	November 29	Utah	L 94–103	Jonas Valančiūnas (22)	Jonas Valančiūnas (17)	Jackson Jr., Morant (4)	FedExForum; 16,605	5–13

December: 8–8 (home: 4–3; road: 4–5)

Game	Date	Team	Score	High points	High rebounds	High assists	Location Attendance	Record
19	December 1	@ Minnesota	W 115–107	Dillon Brooks (26)	Bruno Caboclo (13)	De'Anthony Melton (8)	Target Center; 12,276	6–13
20	December 2	Indiana	L 104–117	Jaren Jackson Jr. (31)	De'Anthony Melton (9)	Tyus Jones (6)	FedExForum; 11,919	6–14
21	December 4	@ Chicago	L 99–106	Jonas Valančiūnas (32)	Jonas Valančiūnas (13)	De'Anthony Melton (7)	United Center; 15,017	6–15
22	December 7	@ Utah	L 112–126	Jaren Jackson Jr. (26)	Jonas Valančiūnas (6)	Tyus Jones (7)	Vivint Smart Home Arena; 18,306	6–16
23	December 9	@ Golden State	W 110–102	Ja Morant (26)	Jonas Valančiūnas (10)	Jones, Morant (7)	Chase Center; 18,064	7–16
24	December 11	@ Phoenix	W 115–108	Dillon Brooks (27)	Jonas Valančiūnas (9)	Ja Morant (6)	Talking Stick Resort Arena; 12,254	8–16
25	December 13	Milwaukee	L 114–127	Jaren Jackson Jr. (43)	Jae Crowder (11)	Tyus Jones (7)	FedExForum; 16,109	8–17
26	December 14	Washington	W 128–111	Dillon Brooks (27)	Jonas Valančiūnas (12)	Tyus Jones (9)	FedExForum; 15,631	9–17
27	December 16	Miami	W 118–111	Jonas Valančiūnas (21)	Jonas Valančiūnas (10)	Ja Morant (10)	FedExForum; 14,021	10–17
28	December 18	@ Oklahoma City	L 122–126	Brandon Clarke (27)	Jonas Valančiūnas (9)	Ja Morant (7)	Chesapeake Energy Arena; 18,203	10–18
29	December 20	@ Cleveland	L 107–114	Jaren Jackson Jr. (24)	Jonas Valančiūnas (14)	Ja Morant (11)	Rocket Mortgage FieldHouse; 19,432	10–19
30	December 21	Sacramento	W 119–115	Jaren Jackson Jr. (18)	Jae Crowder (10)	Jae Crowder (5)	FedExForum; 15,603	11–19
31	December 23	San Antonio	L 115–145	Jaren Jackson Jr. (22)	Jaren Jackson Jr. (12)	Crowder, Morant (4)	FedExForum; 16,776	11–20
32	December 26	@ Oklahoma City	W 110–97	Jonas Valančiūnas (21)	Jae Crowder (10)	Kyle Anderson (7)	Chesapeake Energy Arena; 18,203	12–20
33	December 28	@ Denver	L 110–119	Jaren Jackson Jr. (20)	Jonas Valančiūnas (10)	Ja Morant (8)	Pepsi Center; 19,697	12–21
34	December 29	Charlotte	W 117–104	Dillon Brooks (20)	Jaren Jackson Jr. (12)	Ja Morant (7)	FedExForum; 16,842	13–21

January: 11–4 (home: 7–1; road: 4–3)

Game	Date	Team	Score	High points	High rebounds	High assists	Location Attendance	Record
35	January 2	@ Sacramento	L 123–128	Ja Morant (23)	Jonas Valančiūnas (12)	Ja Morant (7)	Golden 1 Center; 17,351	13–22
36	January 4	@ L. A. Clippers	W 140–114	Jae Crowder (27)	Jonas Valančiūnas (12)	Ja Morant (9)	Staples Center; 19,068	14–22
37	January 5	@ Phoenix	W 121–114	Jonas Valančiūnas (30)	Valančiūnas, Jackson Jr. (8)	Ja Morant (7)	Talking Stick Resort Arena; 14,181	15–22
38	January 7	Minnesota	W 119–112	Dillon Brooks (28)	Jae Crowder (8)	Ja Morant (7)	FedExForum; 14,117	16–22
39	January 10	San Antonio	W 134–121	Jaren Jackson Jr. (24)	Clarke, Valančiūnas (9)	Ja Morant (14)	FedExForum; 16,448	17–22
40	January 12	Golden State	W 122–102	Jonas Valančiūnas (31)	Jonas Valančiūnas (19)	Ja Morant (10)	FedExForum; 16,408	18–22
41	January 14	Houston	W 121–110	Ja Morant (26)	Brandon Clarke (7)	Ja Morant (8)	FedExForum; 16,181	19–22
42	January 17	Cleveland	W 113–109	Dillon Brooks (26)	Jonas Valančiūnas (18)	Ja Morant (8)	FedExForum; 17,102	20–22
43	January 20	New Orleans	L 116–126	Dillon Brooks (31)	Jonas Valančiūnas (11)	Ja Morant (9)	FedExForum; 17,794	20–23
44	January 22	@ Boston	L 95–119	Jonas Valančiūnas (16)	Jonas Valančiūnas (13)	Ja Morant (5)	TD Garden; 19,156	20–24
45	January 24	@ Detroit	W 125–112	Jaren Jackson Jr. (29)	Brandon Clarke (11)	Ja Morant (12)	Little Caesars Arena; 14,583	21–24
46	January 26	Phoenix	W 114–109	Ja Morant (23)	Kyle Anderson (12)	Ja Morant (8)	FedExForum; 17,214	22–24
47	January 28	Denver	W 104–96	Dillon Brooks (24)	Jonas Valančiūnas (12)	Jones, Morant (7)	FedExForum; 14,365	23–24
48	January 29	@ New York	W 127–106	Dillon Brooks (27)	Jonas Valančiūnas (13)	Ja Morant (10)	Madison Square Garden; 18,768	24–24
49	January 31	@ New Orleans	L 111–139	Jonas Valančiūnas (18)	Jonas Valančiūnas (8)	Anderson, Jones, Morant (3)	Smoothie King Center; 18,362	24–25

February: 5–6 (home: 3–1; road: 2–5)

Game	Date	Team	Score	High points	High rebounds	High assists	Location Attendance	Record
50	February 3	Detroit	W 96–82	Jonas Valančiūnas (26)	Jonas Valančiūnas (17)	Ja Morant (7)	FedExForum; 14,597	25–25
51	February 5	@ Dallas	W 121–107	Ja Morant (21)	Jonas Valančiūnas (10)	Kyle Anderson (6)	American Airlines Center; 20,069	26–25
52	February 7	@ Philadelphia	L 107–119	Ja Morant (15)	Jonas Valančiūnas (10)	Tyus Jones (7)	Wells Fargo Center; 20,779	26–26
53	February 9	@ Washington	W 106–99	Ja Morant (27)	Jonas Valančiūnas (18)	Ja Morant (10)	Capital One Arena; 17,251	27–26
54	February 12	Portland	W 111–104	Brandon Clarke (27)	Jonas Valančiūnas (18)	Ja Morant (9)	FedExForum; 16,889	28–26
55	February 20	@ Sacramento	L 125–129	De'Anthony Melton (24)	Clarke, Valančiūnas (11)	Tyus Jones (6)	Golden 1 Center; 17,078	28–27
56	February 21	@ L. A. Lakers	L 105–117	Josh Jackson (20)	Jonas Valančiūnas (11)	Tyus Jones (5)	Staples Center; 18,997	28–28
57	February 24	@ L. A. Clippers	L 97–124	Ja Morant (16)	Gorgui Dieng (10)	Dillon Brooks (5)	Staples Center; 19,068	28–29
58	February 26	@ Houston	L 112–140	Dillon Brooks (22)	Jonas Valančiūnas (10)	Ja Morant (9)	Toyota Center; 18,055	28–30
59	February 28	Sacramento	L 101–104	Dillon Brooks (32)	Jonas Valančiūnas (25)	Ja Morant (11)	FedExForum; 17,794	28–31
60	February 29	L. A. Lakers	W 105–88	Ja Morant (27)	Jonas Valančiūnas (20)	Ja Morant (14)	FedExForum; 17,794	29–31

March: 3–2 (home: 1–1; road: 2–1)

Game	Date	Team	Score	High points	High rebounds	High assists	Location Attendance	Record
61	March 2	@ Atlanta	W 127–88	Gorgui Dieng (17)	Jonas Valančiūnas (15)	Tyus Jones (9)	State Farm Arena; 16,207	30–31
62	March 4	@ Brooklyn	W 118–79	Josh Jackson (19)	Jonas Valančiūnas (16)	Tyus Jones (6)	Barclays Center; 16,941	31–31
63	March 6	@ Dallas	L 96–121	Josh Jackson (16)	Jonas Valančiūnas (11)	Ja Morant (8)	American Airlines Center; 20,370	31–32
64	March 7	Atlanta	W 118–101	Jonas Valančiūnas (27)	Jonas Valančiūnas (17)	Ja Morant (6)	FedExForum; 17,117	32–32
65	March 10	Orlando	L 115–120	Jonas Valančiūnas (27)	Jonas Valančiūnas (16)	De'Anthony Melton (6)	FedExForum; 15,388	32–33

Seeding games: 2–6 (home: 2–2; road: 0–4)

Game	Date	Team	Score	High points	High rebounds	High assists	Location Attendance	Record
66	July 31	@ Portland	L 135–140 (OT)	Jaren Jackson Jr. (33)	Brandon Clarke (7)	Ja Morant (11)	The Arena; No In-Person Attendance	32–34
67	August 2	San Antonio	L 106–108	Ja Morant (25)	Jonas Valančiūnas (9)	Ja Morant (9)	Visa Athletic Center; No In-Person Attendance	32–35
68	August 3	@ New Orleans	L 99–109	Jaren Jackson Jr. (22)	Jonas Valančiūnas (13)	Ja Morant (8)	HP Field House; No In-Person Attendance	32–36
69	August 5	@ Utah	L 115–124	Dillon Brooks (23)	Jonas Valančiūnas (14)	Ja Morant (9)	HP Field House; No In-Person Attendance	32–37
70	August 7	Oklahoma City	W 121–92	Dillon Brooks (22)	Jonas Valančiūnas (11)	Ja Morant (9)	Visa Athletic Center; No In-Person Attendance	33–37
71	August 9	@ Toronto	L 99–108	Dillon Brooks (25)	Jonas Valančiūnas (10)	Ja Morant (10)	Visa Athletic Center; No In-Person Attendance	33–38
72	August 11	Boston	L 107–122	Ja Morant (26)	Jonas Valančiūnas (10)	Ja Morant (13)	HP Field House; No In-Person Attendance	33–39
73	August 13	Milwaukee	W 119–106	Dillon Brooks (31)	Jonas Valančiūnas (19)	Jonas Valančiūnas (12)	Visa Athletic Center; No In-Person Attendance	34–39

Cancelled games

Game	Date	Team	Score	High points	High rebounds	High assists	Location Attendance	Record
66	March 12	@ Portland					Moda Center	
67	March 14	@ Utah					Vivint Smart Home Arena	
68	March 16	@ San Antonio					AT&T Center	
69	March 17	Oklahoma City					FedExForum	
70	March 19	@ Milwaukee					Fiserv Forum	
71	March 21	New Orleans					FedExForum	
72	March 24	@ New Orleans					Smoothie King Center	
73	March 25	Boston					FedExForum	
74	March 28	Toronto					FedExForum	
75	March 30	@ Toronto					Scotiabank Arena	
76	April 1	New York					FedExForum	
77	April 3	Dallas					FedExForum	
78	April 5	@ Portland					Moda Center	
79	April 7	@ Denver					Pepsi Center	
80	April 11	Oklahoma City					FedExForum	
81	April 13	Philadelphia					FedExForum	
82	April 15	@ Houston					Toyota Center	

2019–20 season schedule

=== Play-in ===
2020 play-in game log
Play-in Game: 0–1 (home: 0–0; road: 0–1)

Game	Date	Team	Score	High points	High rebounds	High assists	Location Attendance	Record
1	August 15	@ Portland	L 122–126	Ja Morant (35)	Jonas Valančiūnas (17)	Kyle Anderson (9)	HP Field House; No In-Person Attendance	0–1

2020 playoff schedule

== Player statistics ==
=== Ragular season ===
Player	POS	GP	GS	MP	REB	AST	STL	BLK	PTS	MPG	RPG	APG	SPG	BPG	PPG
Dillon Brooks	SG	73	73	2,112	243	150	63	27	1,181	28.9	3.3	2.1	.9	.4	16.2
Jonas Valančiūnas	C	70	70	1,845	788	131	30	76	1,044	26.4	11.3	1.9	.4	1.1	14.9
Ja Morant	PG	67	67	2,074	259	488	58	18	1,193	31.0	3.9	7.3	.9	.3	17.8
Kyle Anderson	SF	67	28	1,330	285	162	54	37	390	19.9	4.3	2.4	.8	.6	5.8
Tyus Jones	PG	65	6	1,232	103	285	59	6	484	19.0	1.6	4.4	.9	.1	7.4
De'Anthony Melton	PG	60	8	1,167	220	175	77	20	455	19.5	3.7	2.9	1.3	.3	7.6
Brandon Clarke	PF	58	4	1,300	345	81	32	48	700	22.4	5.9	1.4	.6	.8	12.1
Jaren Jackson Jr.	C	57	57	1,622	262	78	40	92	990	28.5	4.6	1.4	.7	1.6	17.4
Solomon Hill^{†}	PF	48	3	901	144	94	31	7	274	18.8	3.0	2.0	.6	.1	5.7
Jae Crowder^{†}	SF	45	45	1,322	277	125	47	14	447	29.4	6.2	2.8	1.0	.3	9.9
Marko Gudurić	SG	44	0	484	73	45	12	8	173	11.0	1.7	1.0	.3	.2	3.9
Grayson Allen	SG	38	0	718	85	52	10	2	330	18.9	2.2	1.4	.3	.1	8.7
Josh Jackson	SF	22	0	381	66	35	18	9	198	17.3	3.0	1.6	.8	.4	9.0
Bruno Caboclo^{†}	C	22	0	192	44	10	10	12	62	8.7	2.0	.5	.5	.5	2.8
John Konchar	SG	19	0	181	47	22	7	3	54	9.5	2.5	1.2	.4	.2	2.8
Yuta Watanabe	SF	18	0	105	20	5	5	1	36	5.8	1.1	.3	.3	.1	2.0
Gorgui Dieng^{†}	C	17	0	318	98	15	14	17	123	18.7	5.8	.9	.8	1.0	7.2
Anthony Tolliver^{†}	PF	13	4	236	33	10	7	1	62	18.2	2.5	.8	.5	.1	4.8
Jarrod Uthoff^{†}	PF	4	0	14	1	0	1	0	4	3.5	.3	.0	.3	.0	1.0
Jordan Bell^{†}	C	2	0	21	3	2	1	0	10	10.5	1.5	1.0	.5	.0	5.0
Dusty Hannahs	SG	2	0	13	1	0	0	0	12	6.5	.5	.0	.0	.0	6.0

- ^{†} Denotes player spent time with another team in the season. Stats reflect time with the Grizzlies only.

== Transactions ==
=== Trades ===
July 6	To Memphis Grizzlies: Grayson Allen; Jae Crowder; Kyle Korver; Draft rights to Darius Bazley (#23); 2020 UTA protected first-round pick	To Utah Jazz: Mike Conley Jr.
July 6	To Memphis Grizzlies: Dwight Howard	To Washington Wizards: C. J. Miles
July 6	To Memphis Grizzlies: Draft rights to Brandon Clarke (#21)	To Oklahoma City Thunder: Draft rights to Darius Bazley (#23); 2024 MEM second-round pick
July 7	To Memphis Grizzlies: Josh Jackson; De'Anthony Melton; 2020 PHX second-round pick; 2021 PHX protected second-round pick	To Phoenix Suns: Jevon Carter; Kyle Korver
July 7	To Memphis Grizzlies: Andre Iguodala; 2024 GSW protected first-round pick	To Golden State Warriors: Julian Washburn
July 7	To Memphis Grizzlies: Solomon Hill; Miles Plumlee	To Atlanta Hawks: Chandler Parsons
July 8	To Memphis Grizzlies: Draft rights to Satnam Singh (2015 #52); 2021 POR second-round pick; 2023 second-round pick	To Dallas Mavericks: Delon Wright (sign and trade)
February 6	Three-team trade	
February 6	To Miami Heat: Andre Iguodala (from Memphis); Jae Crowder (from Memphis); Solomon Hill (from Memphis)	To Memphis Grizzlies: Justise Winslow (from Miami); Dion Waiters (from Miami); Gorgui Dieng (from Minnesota)
February 6	To Minnesota Timberwolves: James Johnson (from Miami)	

=== Free agency ===
==== Re-signed ====
Player	Signed
Jonas Valančiūnas	July 11
Dusty Hannahs	October 14

==== Additions ====
Player	Signed	Former team
John Konchar	July 8	Purdue Fort Wayne Mastodons
Tyus Jones	July 11	Minnesota Timberwolves
Marko Gudurić	July 31	(Turkey) Fenerbahçe Beko
Matt Mooney	September 4	Texas Tech Red Raiders
Ahmad Caver	October 15	Old Dominion Monarchs
Jarrod Uthoff	October 16	(Russia) Zenit Saint Petersburg
Shaq Buchanan	October 17	Murray State Racers
Bennie Boatwright	October 18	USC Trojans

==== Subtractions ====
Player	Reason left	New team
Jordan Bell	Waived	Capital City Go-Go
Avery Bradley	Waived	Los Angeles Lakers
Bennie Boatwright	Waived	Memphis Hustle
Shaq Buchanan	Waived	Memphis Hustle
Ahmad Caver	Waived	Memphis Hustle
Tyler Dorsey	UFA	(Israel) Maccabi FOX Tel Aviv
Dusty Hannahs	Waived	Memphis Hustle
Dwight Howard	Waived	Los Angeles Lakers
Justin Holiday	UFA	Indiana Pacers
Matt Mooney	Waived	Memphis Hustle
Joakim Noah	UFA	Los Angeles Clippers
Miles Plumlee	Waived	(China) Zhejiang Lions
Ivan Rabb	Waived	New York Knicks
Jarrod Uthoff	Waived	Memphis Hustle
Tyler Zeller	UFA	Denver Nuggets
