= 2019–20 New Orleans Pelicans season =

- Head coach: Alvin Gentry
- General manager: Trajan Langdon
- Owner: Gayle Benson
- Arena: Smoothie King Center

Results
- Record: 30–42 (.417)
- Place: Division: 5th (Southwest); Conference: 13th (Western)
- Playoff finish: Did not qualify
- Stats at Basketball Reference

Local media
- Television: Fox Sports New Orleans
- Radio: WWL-FM

The 2019–20 New Orleans Pelicans season was the 18th season of the New Orleans Pelicans franchise in the National Basketball Association (NBA). On April 17, 2019, the Pelicans named David Griffin the executive vice president of basketball operations. On May 14, the Pelicans won the top draft choice, making it the second time in franchise history they won the lottery. Five days later, the Pelicans named former Brooklyn Nets assistant general manager Trajan Langdon their newest general manager, replacing interim general manager Danny Ferry.

This was the first season since 2011-12 that long-time power forward Anthony Davis was not on the roster, as he was traded to the Los Angeles Lakers for Brandon Ingram, Lonzo Ball, Josh Hart, 3 future first-round draft picks, and the right to swap first-round picks with the Lakers in 2023, on June 15, 2019. With the Lakers, Davis, along with LeBron James would go on to lead the Lakers to their 17th championship title and the franchise's first in the post-Kobe Bryant era. Five days trading Davis, on June 20, the Pelicans selected Duke phenom Zion Williamson first overall in the 2019 NBA draft, and due to an injury, he wouldn't play his first professional game until January 23, 2020, where in a game vs the San Antonio Spurs, he had dropped 22 points in just 18 minutes during the 4th quarter.

The season was suspended by the league officials following the games of March 11 after it was reported that Rudy Gobert tested positive for COVID-19. On June 4, the Pelicans were named as one of the 22 teams heading to the NBA Bubble at Walt Disney World's ESPN Wide World of Sports Complex for the continuation of the NBA season. The Pelicans failed to qualify for the postseason for the second consecutive season following a loss to the San Antonio Spurs along with a win by the Trail Blazers over the Philadelphia 76ers on the same day. It was also the first time in his career that shooting guard JJ Redick missed the playoffs.

== Draft ==
Round	Pick	Player	Position	Nationality	College / Club
1	1	Zion Williamson	PF	United States	Duke
2	57	Jordan Bone	PG	United States	Tennessee

The Pelicans will hold the first pick in the draft this year due to them winning the NBA draft lottery, along with two second-round draft picks. On June 15, the Pelicans agreed to a trade involving star forward/center Anthony Davis where, in exchange for a few of the Los Angeles Lakers' young, promising players, they also acquired a multitude of first-round draft picks, one of which includes the fourth selection of this year's draft. However, the trade was not finalized until July 6. On the night of the draft, the Pelicans agreed to a deal with the Atlanta Hawks, where they would give up the Lakers' fourth pick of the draft (which became De'Andre Hunter from the University of Virginia), their 57th pick, a future second-round pick, and Solomon Hill in exchange for Picks 8, 17, and 35. Just like their trade with the Lakers, however, this trade wasn't finalized until July 6.

With the #1 of the draft, New Orleans selected star power forward Zion Williamson from Duke University. In his only season in Duke, Williamson earned many honors and awards for his play, including the consensus National College Player of the Year. With the 39th pick, the Pelicans acquired Serbian power forward Alen Smailagić from the Santa Cruz Warriors in the NBA G League, but traded him to the Golden State Warriors for two future second-round picks and cash considerations. With the 57th pick, the Pelicans selected point guard Jordan Bone from the University of Tennessee. He would end up being traded to the Detroit Pistons after multiple trades.

== Roster ==
2019–20 New Orleans Pelicans roster
Players

Pos.	No.	Player	Height	Weight	DOB	From
G	0	Nickeil Alexander-Walker	6 ft 6 in (1.98 m)	205 lb (93 kg)	1998–09–02	Virginia Tech
G	2	Lonzo Ball	6 ft 6 in (1.98 m)	190 lb (86 kg)	1997–10–27	UCLA
F	45	Zylan Cheatham (TW)	6 ft 5 in (1.96 m)	220 lb (100 kg)	1995–11–17	Arizona State
F/C	22	Derrick Favors	6 ft 9 in (2.06 m)	265 lb (120 kg)	1991–07–15	Georgia Tech
G	5	Josh Gray (TW)	6 ft 0 in (1.83 m)	180 lb (82 kg)	1993–09–09	LSU
G/F	3	Josh Hart	6 ft 5 in (1.96 m)	215 lb (98 kg)	1995–03–06	Villanova
F/C	10	Jaxson Hayes	7 ft 0 in (2.13 m)	220 lb (100 kg)	2000–05–23	Texas
G	11	Jrue Holiday	6 ft 3 in (1.91 m)	205 lb (93 kg)	1990–06–12	UCLA
F	14	Brandon Ingram	6 ft 9 in (2.06 m)	190 lb (86 kg)	1997–09–02	Duke
G	15	Frank Jackson	6 ft 3 in (1.91 m)	205 lb (93 kg)	1998–05–04	Duke
F	20	Nicolò Melli	6 ft 9 in (2.06 m)	236 lb (107 kg)	1991–01–26	Italy
F	21	Darius Miller (injured)	6 ft 8 in (2.03 m)	225 lb (102 kg)	1990–03–21	Kentucky
G	55	E'Twaun Moore	6 ft 3 in (1.91 m)	191 lb (87 kg)	1989–02–25	Purdue
C	9	Jahlil Okafor	6 ft 11 in (2.11 m)	270 lb (122 kg)	1995–12–15	Duke
G	4	JJ Redick	6 ft 3 in (1.91 m)	200 lb (91 kg)	1984–06–24	Duke
G	12	Sindarius Thornwell	6 ft 4 in (1.93 m)	215 lb (98 kg)	1994–11–15	South Carolina
G/F	34	Kenrich Williams	6 ft 7 in (2.01 m)	210 lb (95 kg)	1994–12–02	TCU
F	1	Zion Williamson	6 ft 7 in (2.01 m)	284 lb (129 kg)	2000–07–06	Duke

Coaches
Head coach
- Alvin Gentry
Assistant(s)
- Jeff Bzdelik (Associate HC)
- Chris Finch (Associate HC)
- Jamelle McMillan
- Fred Vinson

Legend
- (DP) Unsigned draft pick
- (FA) Free agent
- (S) Suspended
- (GL) On assignment to G League
- (TW) Two-way affiliate player
- Injured

Roster
Updated: 2020–01–30

== Standings ==
=== Division ===
Southwest Division	W	L	PCT	GB	Home	Road	Div	GP
y – Houston Rockets	44	28	.611	–	24‍–‍12	20‍–‍16	8–5	72
x – Dallas Mavericks	43	32	.573	2.5	20‍–‍18	23‍–‍14	10–4	75
pi – Memphis Grizzlies	34	39	.466	10.5	20‍–‍17	14‍–‍22	4–9	73
San Antonio Spurs	32	39	.451	11.5	19‍–‍15	13‍–‍24	7–6	71
New Orleans Pelicans	30	42	.417	14.0	15‍–‍21	15‍–‍21	4–9	72

=== Conference ===
Western Conference
#	Team	W	L	PCT	GB	GP
1	c – Los Angeles Lakers *	52	19	.732	–	71
2	x – Los Angeles Clippers	49	23	.681	3.5	72
3	y – Denver Nuggets *	46	27	.630	7.0	73
4	y – Houston Rockets *	44	28	.611	8.5	72
5	x – Oklahoma City Thunder	44	28	.611	8.5	72
6	x – Utah Jazz	44	28	.611	8.5	72
7	x – Dallas Mavericks	43	32	.573	11.0	75
8	x – Portland Trail Blazers	35	39	.473	18.5	74
9	pi – Memphis Grizzlies	34	39	.466	19.0	73
10	Phoenix Suns	34	39	.466	19.0	73
11	San Antonio Spurs	32	39	.451	20.0	71
12	Sacramento Kings	31	41	.431	21.5	72
13	New Orleans Pelicans	30	42	.417	22.5	72
14	Minnesota Timberwolves	19	45	.297	29.5	64
15	Golden State Warriors	15	50	.231	34.0	65

== Game log ==
=== Preseason ===
2019 preseason game log
Total: 5–0 (Home: 1–0; Road: 4–0)
Preseason: 5–0 (home: 1–0; road: 4–0)

Game	Date	Team	Score	High points	High rebounds	High assists	Location Attendance	Record
1	October 7	@ Atlanta	W 133–109	Jrue Holiday (21)	Zion Williamson (7)	Lonzo Ball (7)	State Farm Arena; 15,441	1–0
2	October 9	@ Chicago	W 127–125	Zion Williamson (29)	Derrick Favors (9)	Lonzo Ball (9)	United Center; 18,670	2–0
3	October 11	Utah	W 128–127	Zion Williamson (26)	Brandon Ingram (6)	Nickeil Alexander-Walker (4)	Smoothie King Center; 17,954	3–0
4	October 13	@ San Antonio	W 123–114	Zion Williamson (22)	Zion Williamson (10)	Nickeil Alexander-Walker (7)	AT&T Center; 12,101	4–0
5	October 18	@ New York	W 117–116	Alexander-Walker, Hart (7)	Jahlil Okafor (9)	Moore, Holiday (4)	Madison Square Garden; 19,812	5–0

2019–20 season schedule

=== Regular season ===
2019–20 game log
Total: 30–42 (Home: 15–21; Road: 15–21)
October: 1–4 (home: 1–2; road: 0–2)

Game	Date	Team	Score	High points	High rebounds	High assists	Location Attendance	Record
1	October 22	@ Toronto	L 122–130 (OT)	Brandon Ingram (22)	Josh Hart (10)	Jrue Holiday (6)	Scotiabank Arena; 20,787	0–1
2	October 25	Dallas	L 116–123	Brandon Ingram (25)	Josh Hart (9)	Jrue Holiday (8)	Smoothie King Center; 17,027	0–2
3	October 26	@ Houston	L 123–126	Brandon Ingram (35)	Brandon Ingram (15)	Lonzo Ball (10)	Toyota Center; 18,055	0–3
4	October 28	Golden State	L 123–134	Brandon Ingram (27)	Brandon Ingram (10)	Lonzo Ball (9)	Smoothie King Center; 17,307	0–4
5	October 31	Denver	W 122–107	Jahlil Okafor (26)	Okafor, Holiday, Hart, Alexander-Walker (5)	Lonzo Ball (8)	Smoothie King Center; 16,613	1–4

November: 5–9 (home: 3–3; road: 2–6)

Game	Date	Team	Score	High points	High rebounds	High assists	Location Attendance	Record
6	November 2	@ Oklahoma City	L 104–115	JJ Redick (17)	Josh Hart (15)	Lonzo Ball (7)	Chesapeake Energy Arena; 18,203	1–5
7	November 4	@ Brooklyn	L 125–135	Brandon Ingram (40)	Hart, Holiday (7)	Brandon Ingram (5)	Barclays Center; 17,194	1–6
8	November 8	Toronto	L 104–122	Brandon Ingram (27)	Derrick Favors (10)	Jrue Holiday (6)	Smoothie King Center; 16,337	1–7
9	November 9	@ Charlotte	W 115–110	Brandon Ingram (25)	Derrick Favors (10)	Jrue Holiday (11)	Spectrum Center; 18,513	2–7
10	November 11	Houston	L 116–122	JJ Redick (24)	Derrick Favors (12)	Jrue Holiday (11)	Smoothie King Center; 16,695	2–8
11	November 14	L. A. Clippers	W 132–127	Jrue Holiday (36)	Derrick Favors (20)	Jrue Holiday (7)	Smoothie King Center; 17,147	3–8
12	November 16	@ Miami	L 94–109	Nickeil Alexander-Walker (27)	Melli, Williams (5)	E'Twaun Moore (5)	American Airlines Arena; 19,600	3–9
13	November 17	Golden State	W 108–100	JJ Redick (26)	Hayes, Williams (10)	Jrue Holiday (9)	Smoothie King Center; 16,812	4–9
14	November 19	Portland	W 115–104	Jrue Holiday (22)	Kenrich Williams (13)	Jrue Holiday (10)	Smoothie King Center; 15,021	5–9
15	November 21	@ Phoenix	W 124–121	Brandon Ingram (28)	Kenrich Williams (9)	Jrue Holiday (9)	Talking Stick Resort Arena; 13,903	6–9
16	November 23	@ Utah	L 120–128	Brandon Ingram (33)	JJ Redick (7)	Brandon Ingram (5)	Vivint Smart Home Arena; 18,306	6–10
17	November 24	@ L. A. Clippers	L 109–134	Brandon Ingram (24)	Brandon Ingram (8)	Ingram, Ball (5)	Staples Center; 19,068	6–11
18	November 27	L. A. Lakers	L 110–114	Jrue Holiday (29)	Brandon Ingram (10)	Jrue Holiday (12)	Smoothie King Center; 18,626	6–12
19	November 29	@ Oklahoma City	L 104–109	Brandon Ingram (26)	Brandon Ingram (8)	Jrue Holiday (6)	Chesapeake Energy Arena; 18,203	6–13

December: 5–10 (home: 2–6; road: 3–4)

Game	Date	Team	Score	High points	High rebounds	High assists	Location Attendance	Record
20	December 1	Oklahoma City	L 104–107	Jrue Holiday (26)	Josh Hart (11)	Lonzo Ball (7)	Smoothie King Center; 15,427	6–14
21	December 3	Dallas	L 97–118	Brandon Ingram (24)	Hayes, Melli (8)	Brandon Ingram (6)	Smoothie King Center; 14,664	6–15
22	December 5	Phoenix	L 132–139 (OT)	JJ Redick (26)	Jrue Holiday (7)	Lonzo Ball (11)	Smoothie King Center; 15,607	6–16
23	December 7	@ Dallas	L 84–130	JJ Redick (15)	Jaxson Hayes (5)	Jrue Holiday (4)	American Airlines Center; 19,456	6–17
24	December 9	Detroit	L 103–105	Brandon Ingram (31)	Kenrich Williams (8)	Hart, Holiday (5)	Smoothie King Center; 13,694	6–18
25	December 11	@ Milwaukee	L 112–127	JJ Redick (31)	Brandon Ingram (10)	Ball, Holiday, Okafor (6)	Fiserv Forum; 17,385	6–19
26	December 13	@ Philadelphia	L 109–116	Brandon Ingram (32)	Derrick Favors (8)	Jrue Holiday (10)	Wells Fargo Center; 20,620	6–20
27	December 15	Orlando	L 119–130	Jrue Holiday (29)	Jaxson Hayes (7)	Jrue Holiday (8)	Smoothie King Center; 15,388	6–21
28	December 17	Brooklyn	L 101–108 (OT)	Brandon Ingram (22)	Brandon Ingram (10)	Jrue Holiday (6)	Smoothie King Center; 15,177	6–22
29	December 18	@ Minnesota	W 107–99	Brandon Ingram (34)	Derrick Favors (11)	Lonzo Ball (6)	Target Center; 12,490	7–22
30	December 20	@ Golden State	L 102–106	Ingram, Holiday (25)	Derrick Favors (10)	Brandon Ingram (6)	Chase Center; 18,064	7–23
31	December 23	@ Portland	W 102–94	Jrue Holiday (21)	Derrick Favors (13)	Ingram, Holiday (5)	Moda Center; 19,499	8–23
32	December 25	@ Denver	W 112–100	Brandon Ingram (31)	Derrick Favors (13)	Favors, Holiday (8)	Pepsi Center; 19,520	9–23
33	December 28	Indiana	W 120–98	Brandon Ingram (31)	Derrick Favors (16)	Ingram, Holiday (7)	Smoothie King Center; 15,391	10–23
34	December 29	Houston	W 127–112	Ingram, Ball (27)	Derrick Favors (16)	Lonzo Ball (8)	Smoothie King Center; 17,712	11–23

January: 9–6 (home: 4–4; road: 5–2)

Game	Date	Team	Score	High points	High rebounds	High assists	Location Attendance	Record
35	January 3	@ L. A. Lakers	L 113–123	Lonzo Ball (23)	Derrick Favors (14)	Jrue Holiday (6)	Staples Center; 18,997	11–24
36	January 4	@ Sacramento	W 117–115	Lonzo Ball (24)	Derrick Favors (11)	Lonzo Ball (10)	Golden 1 Center; 16,808	12–24
37	January 6	Utah	L 126–128	Brandon Ingram (35)	Derrick Favors (10)	Lonzo Ball (7)	Smoothie King Center; 14,138	12–25
38	January 8	Chicago	W 123–108	Brandon Ingram (29)	Jaxson Hayes (12)	Brandon Ingram (11)	Smoothie King Center; 15,324	13–25
39	January 10	@ New York	W 123–111	Brandon Ingram (28)	Hart, Hayes (10)	Lonzo Ball (11)	Madison Square Garden; 18,003	14–25
40	January 11	@ Boston	L 105–140	Frank Jackson (22)	Lonzo Ball (13)	Lonzo Ball (9)	TD Garden; 19,156	14–26
41	January 13	@ Detroit	W 117–110 (OT)	Jahlil Okafor (25)	Jahlil Okafor (14)	Lonzo Ball (9)	Little Caesars Arena; 13,780	15–26
42	January 16	Utah	W 138–132 (OT)	Brandon Ingram (49)	Derrick Favors (11)	Lonzo Ball (13)	Smoothie King Center; 16,717	16–26
43	January 18	L. A. Clippers	L 130–133	Derrick Favors (22)	Derrick Favors (11)	Lonzo Ball (11)	Smoothie King Center; 17,959	16–27
44	January 20	@ Memphis	W 126–116	Jrue Holiday (36)	Lonzo Ball (9)	Brandon Ingram (6)	FedExForum; 17,794	17–27
45	January 22	San Antonio	L 117–121	Ingram, Williamson (22)	Derrick Favors (10)	Lonzo Ball (12)	Smoothie King Center; 18,365	17–28
46	January 24	Denver	L 106–113	JJ Redick (18)	Josh Hart (13)	Jrue Holiday (9)	Smoothie King Center; 16,398	17–29
47	January 26	Boston	W 123–108	Jrue Holiday (25)	Zion Williamson (11)	Lonzo Ball (15)	Smoothie King Center; 16,737	18–29
48	January 28	@ Cleveland	W 125–111	Jrue Holiday (28)	Zion Williamson (9)	Jrue Holiday (8)	Rocket Mortgage FieldHouse; 19,432	19–29
49	January 31	Memphis	W 139–111	Zion Williamson (24)	Josh Hart (11)	Lonzo Ball (8)	Smoothie King Center; 18,362	20–29

February: 6–4 (home: 2–2; road: 4–2)

Game	Date	Team	Score	High points	High rebounds	High assists	Location Attendance	Record
50	February 2	@ Houston	L 109–117	Brandon Ingram (28)	Brandon Ingram (12)	Lonzo Ball (9)	Toyota Center; 18,055	20–30
51	February 4	Milwaukee	L 108–120	Brandon Ingram (32)	Lonzo Ball (14)	Holiday, Williamson (5)	Smoothie King Center; 15,424	20–31
52	February 6	@ Chicago	W 125–119	Zion Williamson (21)	Derrick Favors (15)	Lonzo Ball (10)	United Center; 18,247	21–31
53	February 8	@ Indiana	W 124–117	Jrue Holiday (31)	Derrick Favors (11)	Jrue Holiday (10)	Bankers Life Fieldhouse; 17,923	22–31
54	February 11	Portland	W 138–117	Zion Williamson (31)	Melli, Williamson (9)	Ball, Holiday (10)	Smoothie King Center; 15,739	23–31
55	February 13	Oklahoma City	L 118–123	Zion Williamson (32)	Derrick Favors (9)	Jrue Holiday (11)	Smoothie King Center; 17,865	23–32
56	February 21	@ Portland	W 128–115	Zion Williamson (25)	Josh Hart (13)	Jrue Holiday (9)	Moda Center; 19,946	24–32
57	February 23	@ Golden State	W 115–101	Zion Williamson (28)	Derrick Favors (11)	Jrue Holiday (15)	Chase Center; 18,064	25–32
58	February 25	@ L. A. Lakers	L 109–118	Brandon Ingram (34)	Lonzo Ball (8)	Jrue Holiday (9)	Staples Center; 18,997	25–33
59	February 28	Cleveland	W 116–104	Brandon Ingram (29)	Derrick Favors (15)	Lonzo Ball (12)	Smoothie King Center; 18,304	26–33

March: 2–3 (home: 1–2; road: 1–1)

Game	Date	Team	Score	High points	High rebounds	High assists	Location Attendance	Record
60	March 1	L. A. Lakers	L 114–122	Zion Williamson (35)	Derrick Favors (14)	Lonzo Ball (9)	Smoothie King Center; 18,547	26–34
61	March 3	Minnesota	L 134–139	Jrue Holiday (27)	Jrue Holiday (10)	Jrue Holiday (12)	Smoothie King Center; 15,264	26–35
62	March 4	@ Dallas	L 123–127 (OT)	Brandon Ingram (27)	Derrick Favors (14)	Ball, Holiday (6)	American Airlines Center; 20,459	26–36
63	March 6	Miami	W 110–104	Jrue Holiday (20)	Josh Hart (12)	Lonzo Ball (8)	Smoothie King Center; 18,384	27–36
64	March 8	@ Minnesota	W 120–107	Jrue Holiday (37)	Brandon Ingram (12)	Ball, Holiday (8)	Target Center; 18,978	28–36

Seeding games: 2–6 (home: 2–2; road: 0–4)

Game	Date	Team	Score	High points	High rebounds	High assists	Location Attendance	Record
65	July 30	Utah	L 104–106	Brandon Ingram (23)	Favors, Ingram (8)	Lonzo Ball (7)	HP Field House; No In-Person Attendance	28–37
66	August 1	@ L. A. Clippers	L 103–126	Nickeil Alexander-Walker (15)	Derrick Favors (9)	Frank Jackson (6)	HP Field House; No In-Person Attendance	28–38
67	August 3	Memphis	W 109–99	Brandon Ingram (24)	Derrick Favors (13)	Lonzo Ball (6)	HP Field House; No In-Person Attendance	29–38
68	August 6	@ Sacramento	L 125–140	Ingram, Williamson (24)	Jrue Holiday (5)	Lonzo Ball (11)	HP Field House; No In-Person Attendance	29–39
69	August 7	Washington	W 118–107	Jrue Holiday (28)	Derrick Favors (10)	Jrue Holiday (6)	Visa Athletic Center; No In-Person Attendance	30–39
70	August 9	San Antonio	L 113–122	JJ Redick (31)	Derrick Favors (12)	Lonzo Ball (10)	HP Field House; No In-Person Attendance	30–40
71	August 11	@ Sacramento	L 106–112	Jahlil Okafor (21)	Josh Hart (10)	Nickeil Alexander-Walker (6)	The Arena; No In-Person Attendance	30–41
72	August 13	@ Orlando	L 127–133	Frank Jackson (31)	Josh Hart (14)	Nickeil Alexander-Walker (7)	Visa Athletic Center; No In-Person Attendance	30–42

Cancelled games

Game	Date	Team	Score	High points	High rebounds	High assists	Location Attendance	Record
65	March 11	@ Sacramento					Golden 1 Center	
66	March 13	@ Utah					Vivint Smart Home Arena	
67	March 14	@ LA Clippers					Staples Center	
68	March 16	Atlanta					Smoothie King Center	
69	March 18	San Antonio					Smoothie King Center	
70	March 21	@ Memphis					FedExForum	
71	March 22	Sacramento					Smoothie King Center	
72	March 24	Memphis					Smoothie King Center	
73	March 27	New York					Smoothie King Center	
74	March 29	@ Orlando					Amway Center	
75	March 31	@ Atlanta					State Farm Arena	
76	April 1	@ Washington					Capital One Arena	
77	April 5	@ San Antonio					AT&T Center	
78	April 7	Charlotte					Smoothie King Center	
79	April 9	Phoenix					Smoothie King Center	
80	April 11	Philadelphia					Smoothie King Center	
81	April 13	Washington					Smoothie King Center	
82	April 15	@ San Antonio					AT&T Center	

2019–20 season schedule

== Player statistics ==
Legend
GP	Games played	GS	Games started	MPG	Minutes per game
FG%	Field-goal percentage	3P%	3-point field-goal percentage	FT%	Free-throw percentage
RPG	Rebounds per game	APG	Assists per game	SPG	Steals per game
BPG	Blocks per game	PPG	Points per game

=== Regular season ===
New Orleans Pelicans statistics
Player	GP	GS	MPG	FG%	3P%	FT%	RPG	APG	SPG	BPG	PPG
Josh Hart	65	16	27.0	.423	.342	.739	6.5	1.7	1.0	.4	10.1
Jaxson Hayes	64	14	16.9	.672	.250	.647	4.0	.9	.4	.9	7.4
Lonzo Ball	63	54	32.1	.403	.375	.566	6.1	7.0	1.4	.6	11.8
Brandon Ingram	62	62	33.9	.463	.391	.851	6.1	4.2	1.0	.6	23.8
Jrue Holiday	61	61	34.7	.455	.353	.709	4.8	6.7	1.6	.8	19.1
JJ Redick	60	36	26.4	.453	.453	.892	2.5	2.0	.3	.2	15.3
Nicolò Melli	60	8	17.4	.421	.335	.740	3.0	1.4	.6	.4	6.6
Frank Jackson	59	2	13.5	.405	.326	.747	1.4	1.0	.3	.1	6.3
E'Twaun Moore	56	6	18.2	.426	.377	.689	2.3	1.4	.6	.2	8.3
Derrick Favors	51	49	24.4	.617	.143	.563	9.8	1.6	.6	.9	9.0
Nickeil Alexander-Walker	47	1	12.6	.368	.346	.676	1.8	1.9	.4	.2	5.7
Kenrich Williams	39	18	21.3	.347	.258	.346	4.8	1.5	.7	.5	3.5
Jahlil Okafor	30	9	15.6	.623	.333	.645	4.2	1.2	.2	.7	8.1
Zion Williamson	24	24	27.8	.583	.429	.640	6.3	2.1	.7	.4	22.5
Zylan Cheatham	4	0	12.8	.667	.000		2.3	.8	.3	.3	3.0
Sindarius Thornwell	2	0	17.5	.545	.500	.500	2.0	2.0	.5	.5	8.0
Josh Gray	2	0	11.5	.500			1.0	1.0	.0	.0	1.0
