= 2019–20 Sacramento Kings season =

NBA professional basketball team season

- Head coach: Luke Walton
- General manager: Vlade Divac
- Owner: Vivek Ranadivé
- Arena: Golden 1 Center

Results
- Record: 31–41 (.431)
- Place: Division: 4th (Pacific); Conference: 12th (Western)
- Playoff finish: Did not qualify
- Stats at Basketball Reference

Local media
- Television: NBC Sports California; CBS 13
- Radio: KHTK Sports 1140

The 2019–20 Sacramento Kings season was the 75th season of the franchise, its 71st season in the National Basketball Association (NBA), and its 35th in Sacramento.

The Kings entered the season with the current longest NBA playoff appearance drought at 13 seasons, last qualifying in 2006. Following a record of 39–43 the previous season, the Kings' head coach Dave Joerger was fired on April 11, 2019. Two days later, they hired former Lakers coach Luke Walton. The Kings hired former Suns head coach Igor Kokoškov as an assistant coach.

The season was suspended by the league officials following the games of March 11 after it was reported that Rudy Gobert had tested positive for COVID-19. On July 5, the NBA announced a return of the season which would involve 22 teams playing in the NBA Bubble at the ESPN Wide World of Sports Complex at the Walt Disney World Resort in Florida. Each of the remaining 22 teams would play eight seeding games to determine positioning for the NBA playoffs. The Kings resumed play on July 31. But a 129–112 loss to the Houston Rockets eliminated the Kings from playoff contention for a 14th season in a row, extending the third longest active drought among all four North American major professional sports leagues.

== Draft picks ==
| Round | Pick | Player | Position | Nationality | College / Club |
|---|---|---|---|---|---|
| 2 | 40 | Justin James | SG | United States | Wyoming |
| 2 | 47 | Ignas Brazdeikis | SF | Canada; Lithuania | Michigan |
| 2 | 60 | Vanja Marinković | SG | Serbia | Partizan Belgrade |

The Sacramento Kings hold no first-round picks, but three second-round picks. Their first-round pick was traded to the Philadelphia 76ers in 2015 and the 76ers conditionally traded it to the Boston Celtics in the days entering the 2017 NBA draft. The lottery selection the team had failed to reach the 1st pick, meaning the pick goes to the Boston Celtics. The 47th pick would be traded to the New York Knicks for Kyle Guy and cash considerations.

== Roster ==
2019–20 Sacramento Kings roster
Players

| Pos. | No. | Player | Height | Weight | DOB | From |
|---|---|---|---|---|---|---|
| F | 35 | Marvin Bagley | 6 ft 11 in (2.11 m) | 235 lb (107 kg) | 1999–03–14 | Duke |
| F | 40 | Harrison Barnes | 6 ft 8 in (2.03 m) | 225 lb (102 kg) | 1992–05–30 | North Carolina |
| G | 26 | Kent Bazemore | 6 ft 5 in (1.96 m) | 201 lb (91 kg) | 1989–07–01 | Old Dominion |
| F | 88 | Nemanja Bjelica | 6 ft 10 in (2.08 m) | 234 lb (106 kg) | 1988–05–09 | Serbia |
| G | 8 | Bogdan Bogdanović | 6 ft 6 in (1.98 m) | 220 lb (100 kg) | 1992–08–18 | Serbia |
| G/F | 13 | Corey Brewer | 6 ft 9 in (2.06 m) | 186 lb (84 kg) | 1986–03–05 | Florida |
| G | 3 | Yogi Ferrell | 6 ft 0 in (1.83 m) | 178 lb (81 kg) | 1993–05–09 | Indiana |
| G | 5 | De'Aaron Fox | 6 ft 3 in (1.91 m) | 185 lb (84 kg) | 1997–12–20 | Kentucky |
| F/C | 20 | Harry Giles | 6 ft 11 in (2.11 m) | 240 lb (109 kg) | 1998–04–22 | Duke |
| G | 7 | Kyle Guy (TW) | 6 ft 1 in (1.85 m) | 167 lb (76 kg) | 1997–08–11 | Virginia |
| G | 24 | Buddy Hield | 6 ft 4 in (1.93 m) | 220 lb (100 kg) | 1992–12–17 | Oklahoma |
| C | 22 | Richaun Holmes | 6 ft 10 in (2.08 m) | 235 lb (107 kg) | 1993–10–15 | Bowling Green |
| G/F | 10 | Justin James | 6 ft 7 in (2.01 m) | 190 lb (86 kg) | 1997–01–24 | Wyoming |
| G/F | 19 | DaQuan Jeffries (TW) | 6 ft 5 in (1.96 m) | 230 lb (104 kg) | 1997–08–30 | Tulsa |
| G | 9 | Cory Joseph | 6 ft 3 in (1.91 m) | 200 lb (91 kg) | 1991–08–20 | Texas |
| C | 25 | Alex Len | 7 ft 1 in (2.16 m) | 250 lb (113 kg) | 1993–06–16 | Maryland |
| F | 33 | Jabari Parker | 6 ft 8 in (2.03 m) | 245 lb (111 kg) | 1995–05–15 | Duke |

Coaches
Head coach
- Luke Walton
Assistant(s)
- Bob Beyer
- Igor Kokoškov
- Jesse Mermuys
- Roy Rana

Legend
- (DP) Unsigned draft pick
- (FA) Free agent
- (S) Suspended
- (GL) On assignment to G League affiliate
- (TW) Two-way affiliate player
- Injured

Roster
Updated: 2020–02–29

== Standings ==
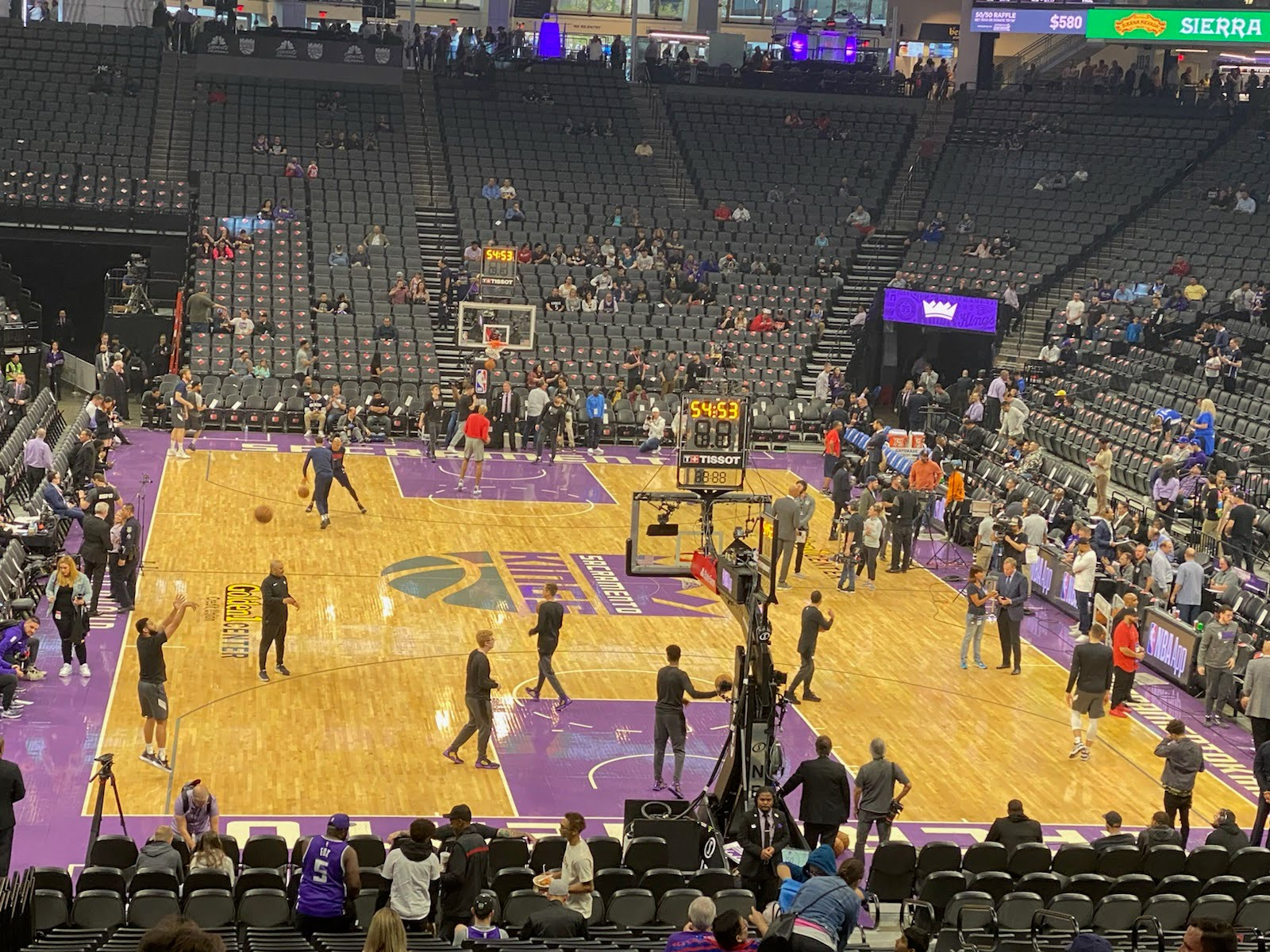
Kings players shoot around after their March 11 game against New Orleans is postponed

=== Division ===
| Pacific Division | W | L | PCT | GB | Home | Road | Div | GP |
|---|---|---|---|---|---|---|---|---|
| c – Los Angeles Lakers | 52 | 19 | .732 | – | 25‍–‍10 | 27‍–‍9 | 10–3 | 71 |
| x – Los Angeles Clippers | 49 | 23 | .681 | 3.5 | 27‍–‍9 | 22‍–‍14 | 8–6 | 72 |
| Phoenix Suns | 34 | 39 | .466 | 19.0 | 17‍–‍22 | 17‍–‍17 | 6–9 | 73 |
| Sacramento Kings | 31 | 41 | .431 | 21.5 | 16‍–‍19 | 15‍–‍22 | 8–5 | 72 |
| Golden State Warriors | 15 | 50 | .231 | 34.0 | 8‍–‍26 | 7‍–‍24 | 2–11 | 65 |

=== Conference ===
Western Conference
| # | Team | W | L | PCT | GB | GP |
|---|---|---|---|---|---|---|
| 1 | c – Los Angeles Lakers * | 52 | 19 | .732 | – | 71 |
| 2 | x – Los Angeles Clippers | 49 | 23 | .681 | 3.5 | 72 |
| 3 | y – Denver Nuggets * | 46 | 27 | .630 | 7.0 | 73 |
| 4 | y – Houston Rockets * | 44 | 28 | .611 | 8.5 | 72 |
| 5 | x – Oklahoma City Thunder | 44 | 28 | .611 | 8.5 | 72 |
| 6 | x – Utah Jazz | 44 | 28 | .611 | 8.5 | 72 |
| 7 | x – Dallas Mavericks | 43 | 32 | .573 | 11.0 | 75 |
| 8 | x – Portland Trail Blazers | 35 | 39 | .473 | 18.5 | 74 |
| 9 | pi – Memphis Grizzlies | 34 | 39 | .466 | 19.0 | 73 |
| 10 | Phoenix Suns | 34 | 39 | .466 | 19.0 | 73 |
| 11 | San Antonio Spurs | 32 | 39 | .451 | 20.0 | 71 |
| 12 | Sacramento Kings | 31 | 41 | .431 | 21.5 | 72 |
| 13 | New Orleans Pelicans | 30 | 42 | .417 | 22.5 | 72 |
| 14 | Minnesota Timberwolves | 19 | 45 | .297 | 29.5 | 64 |
| 15 | Golden State Warriors | 15 | 50 | .231 | 34.0 | 65 |

== Game log ==
=== Preseason ===
2019 preseason game log
Total: 3–2 (Home: 2–1; Road: 1–1)
2019 Preseason: 3–2 (home: 2–1; road: 1–1)

| Game | Date | Team | Score | High points | High rebounds | High assists | Location Attendance | Record |
|---|---|---|---|---|---|---|---|---|
| 1 | October 4 | Indiana | L 131–132 (OT) | Buddy Hield (28) | Bagley III, Bjelica (5) | De'Aaron Fox (8) | NSCI Dome; 4,660 | 0–1 |
| 2 | October 5 | @ Indiana | L 106–130 | Buddy Hield (17) | Dewayne Dedmon (7) | De'Aaron Fox (6) | NSCI Dome; 4,660 | 0–2 |
| 3 | October 10 | Phoenix | W 105–88 | De'Aaron Fox (18) | Marvin Bagley III (13) | De'Aaron Fox (6) | Golden One Center; 15,385 | 1–2 |
| 4 | October 14 | @ Utah | W 128–115 | Buddy Hield (23) | Marvin Bagley III (11) | Bogdan Bogdanović (8) | Vivint Smart Home Arena; 16,339 | 2–2 |
| 5 | October 16 | Melbourne | W 124–110 | Marvin Bagley III (30) | Marvin Bagley III (14) | Ferrell, Hield (6) | Golden One Center; 10,534 | 3–2 |

2019–20 season schedule

2019 preseason game log
Total: 1–2 (Home: 0–1; Road: 1–1)
2020 Preseason: 1–2 (home: 0–1; road: 1–1)

| Game | Date | Team | Score | High points | High rebounds | High assists | Location Attendance | Record |
|---|---|---|---|---|---|---|---|---|
| 1 | July 22 | @ Miami | L 94–104 | Buddy Hield (19) | Harry Giles III (7) | Yogi Ferrell (7) | HP Field House | 0–1 |
| 2 | July 25 | Milwaukee | L 123–131 | Buddy Hield (19) | Kent Bazemore (8) | De'Aaron Fox (6) | The Arena | 0–2 |
| 3 | July 27 | @ L. A. Clippers | W 106–102 | Bogdan Bogdanović (21) | Harry Giles III (9) | De'Aaron Fox (6) | The Arena | 1–2 |

2019–20 season schedule

=== Regular season ===
2019–20 game log
Total: 31–41 (Home: 16–19; Road: 15–22)
October: 0–5 (home: 0–3; road: 0–2)

| Game | Date | Team | Score | High points | High rebounds | High assists | Location Attendance | Record |
|---|---|---|---|---|---|---|---|---|
| 1 | October 23 | @ Phoenix | L 95–124 | Buddy Hield (28) | Marvin Bagley III (10) | De'Aaron Fox (5) | Talking Stick Resort Arena; 18,055 | 0–1 |
| 2 | October 25 | Portland | L 112–122 | De'Aaron Fox (28) | Dewayne Dedmon (8) | De'Aaron Fox (5) | Golden 1 Center; 17,583 | 0–2 |
| 3 | October 26 | @ Utah | L 81–113 | Dewayne Dedmon (11) | Dewayne Dedmon (6) | De'Aaron Fox (5) | Vivint Smart Home Arena; 18,306 | 0–3 |
| 4 | October 28 | Denver | L 94–101 | Richaun Holmes (24) | Richaun Holmes (12) | De'Aaron Fox (9) | Golden 1 Center; 15,870 | 0–4 |
| 5 | October 30 | Charlotte | L 111–118 | Buddy Hield (23) | Richaun Holmes (9) | De'Aaron Fox (10) | Golden 1 Center; 15,416 | 0–5 |

November: 8–5 (home: 5–0; road: 3–5)

| Game | Date | Team | Score | High points | High rebounds | High assists | Location Attendance | Record |
|---|---|---|---|---|---|---|---|---|
| 6 | November 1 | Utah | W 102–101 | De'Aaron Fox (25) | Dewayne Dedmon (7) | De'Aaron Fox (4) | Golden 1 Center; 16,273 | 1–5 |
| 7 | November 3 | @ New York | W 113–92 | De'Aaron Fox (24) | Richaun Holmes (10) | Fox, Bjelica (6) | Madison Square Garden; 19,812 | 2–5 |
| 8 | November 6 | @ Toronto | L 120–124 | Harrison Barnes (26) | Bjelica, Holmes, Hield (8) | De'Aaron Fox (9) | Scotiabank Arena; 19,800 | 2–6 |
| 9 | November 8 | @ Atlanta | W 121–109 | Buddy Hield (22) | Richaun Holmes (9) | De'Aaron Fox (9) | State Farm Arena; 16,447 | 3–6 |
| 10 | November 12 | Portland | W 107–99 | Bogdan Bogdanovic (25) | Nemanja Bjelica (12) | Bogdan Bogdanovic (10) | Golden 1 Center; 16,358 | 4–6 |
| 11 | November 15 | @ L. A. Lakers | L 97–99 | Buddy Hield (21) | Barnes, Holmes, Hield (8) | Harrison Barnes (6) | Staples Center; 18,997 | 4–7 |
| 12 | November 17 | Boston | W 100–99 | Buddy Hield (35) | Nemanja Bjelica (14) | Bogdan Bogdanovic (10) | Golden 1 Center; 16,633 | 5–7 |
| 13 | November 19 | Phoenix | W 120–116 | Bogdan Bogdanovic (31) | Richaun Holmes (15) | Cory Joseph (14) | Golden 1 Center; 16,732 | 6–7 |
| 14 | November 22 | @ Brooklyn | L 97–116 | Harrison Barnes (18) | Richaun Holmes (8) | Joseph, Hield (5) | Barclays Center; 15,619 | 6–8 |
| 15 | November 24 | @ Washington | W 113–106 | Harrison Barnes (26) | Nemanja Bjelica (12) | Joseph, Hield (5) | Capital One Arena; 15,885 | 7–8 |
| 16 | November 25 | @ Boston | L 102–103 | Buddy Hield (41) | Nemanja Bjelica (6) | Bogdan Bogdanovic (8) | TD Garden; 19,156 | 7–9 |
| 17 | November 27 | @ Philadelphia | L 91–97 | Buddy Hield (22) | Harrison Barnes (9) | Harrison Barnes (6) | Wells Fargo Center; 20,592 | 7–10 |
| 18 | November 30 | Denver | W 100–97 (OT) | Harrison Barnes (30) | Nemanja Bjelica (12) | Bjelica, Bogdanovic (5) | Golden 1 Center; 17,583 | 8–10 |

December: 4–12 (home: 1–6; road: 3–6)

| Game | Date | Team | Score | High points | High rebounds | High assists | Location Attendance | Record |
|---|---|---|---|---|---|---|---|---|
| 19 | December 2 | Chicago | L 106–113 | Buddy Hield (26) | Richaun Holmes (9) | Cory Joseph (7) | Golden 1 Center; 17,257 | 8–11 |
| 20 | December 4 | @ Portland | L 116–127 | Richaun Holmes (28) | Richaun Holmes (10) | Joseph, Hield (7) | Moda Center; 19,393 | 8–12 |
| 21 | December 6 | @ San Antonio | L 104–105 (OT) | Buddy Hield (23) | Richaun Holmes (14) | Barnes, Holmes (5) | AT&T Center; 18,354 | 8–13 |
| 22 | December 8 | @ Dallas | W 110–106 | Nemanja Bjelica (30) | Richaun Holmes (9) | Barnes, Hield (5) | American Airlines Center; 19,566 | 9–13 |
| 23 | December 9 | @ Houston | W 119–118 | Buddy Hield (26) | Barnes, Holmes (8) | Trevor Ariza (7) | Toyota Center; 18,055 | 10–13 |
| 24 | December 11 | Oklahoma City | W 94–93 | Buddy Hield (23) | Richaun Holmes (7) | Buddy Hield (6) | Golden 1 Center; 16,723 | 11–13 |
| 25 | December 13 | New York | L 101–103 | Buddy Hield (34) | Buddy Hield (12) | Nemanja Bjelica (7) | Golden 1 Center; 17,583 | 11–14 |
| 26 | December 15 | @ Golden State | W 100–79 | Bogdan Bogdanović (25) | Marvin Bagley III (6) | Joseph, Bogdanović (5) | Chase Center; 18,064 | 12–14 |
| 27 | December 17 | @ Charlotte | L 102–110 | De'Aaron Fox (19) | Marvin Bagley III (7) | De'Aaron Fox (8) | Spectrum Center; 13,229 | 12–15 |
| 28 | December 20 | @ Indiana | L 105–119 | Richaun Holmes (20) | Richaun Holmes (9) | Fox, Hield (6) | Bankers Life Fieldhouse; 14,649 | 12–16 |
| 29 | December 21 | @ Memphis | L 115–119 | Harrison Barnes (25) | Richaun Holmes (12) | Joseph, Barnes (5) | FedExForum; 15,603 | 12–17 |
| 30 | December 23 | Houston | L 104–113 | De'Aaron Fox (31) | Richaun Holmes (13) | De'Aaron Fox (6) | Golden 1 Center; 17,583 | 12–18 |
| 31 | December 26 | Minnesota | L 104–105 (2OT) | Richaun Holmes (20) | Richaun Holmes (18) | Cory Joseph (7) | Golden 1 Center; 17,583 | 12–19 |
| 32 | December 28 | Phoenix | L 110–112 | Buddy Hield (23) | Harrison Barnes (10) | Cory Joseph (5) | Golden 1 Center; 17,583 | 12–20 |
| 33 | December 29 | @ Denver | L 115–120 | Nemanja Bjelica (27) | Bjelica, Holmes (6) | De'Aaron Fox (13) | Pepsi Center; 19,520 | 12–21 |
| 34 | December 31 | L. A. Clippers | L 87–105 | Richaun Holmes (22) | Richaun Holmes (10) | De'Aaron Fox (6) | Golden 1 Center; 16,231 | 12–22 |

January: 6–8 (home: 2–5; road: 4–3)

| Game | Date | Team | Score | High points | High rebounds | High assists | Location Attendance | Record |
|---|---|---|---|---|---|---|---|---|
| 35 | January 2 | Memphis | W 128–123 | De'Aaron Fox (27) | Trevor Ariza (8) | De'Aaron Fox (9) | Golden 1 Center; 17,351 | 13–22 |
| 36 | January 4 | New Orleans | L 115–117 | Harrison Barnes (30) | Holmes, Hield (12) | Joseph, Fox (5) | Golden 1 Center; 16,808 | 13–23 |
| 37 | January 6 | Golden State | W 111–98 | Hield, Fox (21) | Nemanja Bjelica (10) | De'Aaron Fox (7) | Golden 1 Center; 15,819 | 14–23 |
| 38 | January 7 | @ Phoenix | W 114–103 | De'Aaron Fox (27) | Dewayne Dedmon (10) | De'Aaron Fox (6) | Talking Stick Resort Arena; 14,134 | 15–23 |
| 39 | January 10 | Milwaukee | L 106–127 | Barnes, Fox (19) | Nemanja Bjelica (13) | De'Aaron Fox (10) | Golden 1 Center; 17,583 | 15–24 |
| 40 | January 13 | Orlando | L 112–114 | Nemanja Bjelica (34) | De'Aaron Fox (8) | De'Aaron Fox (10) | Golden 1 Center; 16,299 | 15–25 |
| 41 | January 15 | Dallas | L 123–127 | De'Aaron Fox (27) | Nemanja Bjelica (12) | De'Aaron Fox (12) | Golden 1 Center; 17,029 | 15–26 |
| 42 | January 18 | @ Utah | L 101–123 | De'Aaron Fox (21) | Marvin Bagley III (7) | De'Aaron Fox (8) | Vivint Smart Home Arena; 18,306 | 15–27 |
| 43 | January 20 | @ Miami | L 113–118 (OT) | Nemanja Bjelica (22) | Marvin Bagley III (15) | De'Aaron Fox (8) | American Airlines Arena; 19,600 | 15–28 |
| 44 | January 22 | @ Detroit | L 106–127 | De'Aaron Fox (22) | Dewayne Dedmon (10) | Bjelica, Hield (5) | Little Caesars Arena; 13,972 | 15–29 |
| 45 | January 24 | @ Chicago | W 98–81 | Buddy Hield (21) | Buddy Hield (8) | De'Aaron Fox (7) | United Center; 17,661 | 16–29 |
| 46 | January 27 | @ Minnesota | W 133–129 (OT) | Buddy Hield (42) | Nemanja Bjelica (9) | Bjelica, Fox (8) | Target Center; 13,449 | 17–29 |
| 47 | January 29 | Oklahoma City | L 100–120 | Bogdan Bogdanović (23) | Dewayne Dedmon (7) | Bjelica, Fox (5) | Golden 1 Center; 16,935 | 17–30 |
| 48 | January 30 | @ L. A. Clippers | W 124–103 | De'Aaron Fox (34) | Dewayne Dedmon (11) | De'Aaron Fox (8) | Staples Center; 19,068 | 18–30 |

February: 7–4 (home: 4–1; road: 3–3)

| Game | Date | Team | Score | High points | High rebounds | High assists | Location Attendance | Record |
|---|---|---|---|---|---|---|---|---|
| 49 | February 1 | L. A. Lakers | L 113–129 | De'Aaron Fox (24) | Harry Giles (8) | Fox, Joseph (5) | Golden 1 Center; 17,583 | 18–31 |
| 50 | February 3 | Minnesota | W 113–109 | De'Aaron Fox (31) | Dewayne Dedmon (12) | Harrison Barnes (7) | Golden 1 Center; 15,819 | 19–31 |
| 51 | February 7 | Miami | W 105–97 | Bogdan Bogdanović (23) | Buddy Hield (7) | Bjelica, Fox (8) | Golden 1 Center; 16,760 | 20–31 |
| 52 | February 8 | San Antonio | W 122–102 | Buddy Hield (31) | Harry Giles (12) | Fox, Hield (5) | Golden 1 Center; 16,756 | 21–31 |
| 53 | February 10 | @ Milwaukee | L 111–123 | Harrison Barnes (23) | Bjelica, Fox (8) | De'Aaron Fox (11) | Fiserv Forum; 17,463 | 21–32 |
| 54 | February 12 | @ Dallas | L 111–130 | Buddy Hield (22) | Barnes, Bazemore, Bjelica (7) | Buddy Hield (9) | American Airlines Center; 19,842 | 21–33 |
| 55 | February 20 | Memphis | W 129–125 | Harrison Barnes (32) | Nemanja Bjelica (6) | Nemanja Bjelica (5) | Golden 1 Center; 17,078 | 22–33 |
| 56 | February 22 | @ L. A. Clippers | W 112–103 | Kent Bazemore (23) | Harry Giles (12) | De'Aaron Fox (8) | Staples Center; 19,068 | 23–33 |
| 57 | February 25 | @ Golden State | W 112–94 | Barnes, Fox (21) | Kent Bazemore (10) | Bjelica, Fox (5) | Chase Center; 18,064 | 24–33 |
| 58 | February 27 | @ Oklahoma City | L 108–112 | Harrison Barnes (21) | Alex Len (11) | Cory Joseph (11) | Chesapeake Energy Arena; 18,203 | 24–34 |
| 59 | February 28 | @ Memphis | W 104–101 | De'Aaron Fox (25) | Nemanja Bjelica (11) | De'Aaron Fox (5) | FedExForum; 17,794 | 25–34 |

March: 3–2 (home: 2–2; road: 1–0)

| Game | Date | Team | Score | High points | High rebounds | High assists | Location Attendance | Record |
|---|---|---|---|---|---|---|---|---|
| 60 | March 1 | Detroit | W 106–100 | De'Aaron Fox (23) | Alex Len (13) | De'Aaron Fox (7) | Golden 1 Center; 17,499 | 26–34 |
| 61 | March 3 | Washington | W 133–126 | De'Aaron Fox (31) | Nemanja Bjelica (7) | 5 players (4) | Golden 1 Center; 16,419 | 27–34 |
| 62 | March 5 | Philadelphia | L 108–125 | De'Aaron Fox (23) | Kent Bazemore (9) | De'Aaron Fox (7) | Golden 1 Center; 15,485 | 27–35 |
| 63 | March 7 | @ Portland | W 123–111 | Bogdan Bogdanović (27) | Richaun Holmes (8) | De'Aaron Fox (11) | Moda Center; 19,691 | 28–35 |
| 64 | March 8 | Toronto | L 113–118 | De'Aaron Fox (28) | Nemanja Bjelica (10) | Cory Joseph (6) | Golden 1 Center; 16,449 | 28–36 |

Seeding games: 3–5 (home: 2–2; road: 1–3)

| Game | Date | Team | Score | High points | High rebounds | High assists | Location Attendance | Record |
|---|---|---|---|---|---|---|---|---|
| 65 | July 31 | @ San Antonio | L 120–129 | De'Aaron Fox (39) | Kent Bazemore (11) | De'Aaron Fox (6) | Visa Athletic Center; No In-Person Attendance | 28–37 |
| 66 | August 2 | @ Orlando | L 116–132 | Harry Giles (23) | Harry Giles (8) | Cory Joseph (6) | HP Field House; No In-Person Attendance | 28–38 |
| 67 | August 4 | Dallas | L 110–114 (OT) | De'Aaron Fox (28) | Nemanja Bjelica (13) | De'Aaron Fox (9) | HP Field House; No In-Person Attendance | 28–39 |
| 68 | August 6 | New Orleans | W 140–125 | Bogdan Bogdanović (35) | Barnes, Len (6) | De'Aaron Fox (10) | HP Field House; No In-Person Attendance | 29–39 |
| 69 | August 7 | @ Brooklyn | L 106–119 | Bogdan Bogdanović (27) | Alex Len (11) | De'Aaron Fox (7) | The Arena; No In-Person Attendance | 29–40 |
| 70 | August 9 | Houston | L 112–129 | De'Aaron Fox (26) | Harrison Barnes (10) | De'Aaron Fox (9) | HP Field House; No In-Person Attendance | 29–41 |
| 71 | August 11 | New Orleans | W 112–106 | Harrison Barnes (25) | Harry Giles (11) | Bogdan Bogdanović (7) | The Arena; No In-Person Attendance | 30–41 |
| 72 | August 13 | @ L. A. Lakers | W 136–122 | Buddy Hield (28) | Bjelica, Parker (8) | Nemanja Bjelica (13) | HP Field House; No In-Person Attendance | 31–41 |

Cancelled games

| Game | Date | Team | Score | High points | High rebounds | High assists | Location Attendance | Record |
|---|---|---|---|---|---|---|---|---|
| 65 | March 11 | New Orleans | | | | | Golden 1 Center | |
| 66 | March 15 | Brooklyn | | | | | Golden 1 Center | |
| 67 | March 17 | Dallas | | | | | Golden 1 Center | |
| 68 | March 19 | @ Houston | | | | | Toyota Center | |
| 69 | March 21 | @ Orlando | | | | | Amway Center | |
| 70 | March 22 | @ New Orleans | | | | | Smoothie King Center | |
| 71 | March 24 | @ Cleveland | | | | | Rocket Mortgage FieldHouse | |
| 72 | March 26 | Atlanta | | | | | Golden 1 Center | |
| 73 | March 29 | Indiana | | | | | Golden 1 Center | |
| 74 | March 31 | San Antonio | | | | | Golden 1 Center | |
| 75 | April 2 | LA Clippers | | | | | Golden 1 Center | |
| 76 | April 4 | LA Lakers | | | | | Golden 1 Center | |
| 77 | April 5 | Cleveland | | | | | Golden 1 Center | |
| 78 | April 7 | @ San Antonio | | | | | AT&T Center | |
| 79 | April 9 | @ Minnesota | | | | | Target Center | |
| 80 | April 11 | @ Denver | | | | | Pepsi Center | |
| 81 | April 14 | @ LA Lakers | | | | | Staples Center | |
| 82 | April 15 | Golden State | | | | | Golden 1 Center | |

2019–20 season schedule

== Player statistics ==
Legend
| GP | Games played | GS | Games started | MPG | Minutes per game |
| FG% | Field-goal percentage | 3P% | 3-point field-goal percentage | FT% | Free-throw percentage |
| RPG | Rebounds per game | APG | Assists per game | SPG | Steals per game |
| BPG | Blocks per game | PPG | Points per game |

=== Regular season ===
| Player | GP | GS | MPG | FG% | 3P% | FT% | RPG | APG | SPG | BPG | PPG |
|---|---|---|---|---|---|---|---|---|---|---|---|
| Harrison Barnes | 72 | 72 | 34.5 | .460 | .381 | .801 | 4.9 | 2.2 | .6 | .2 | 14.5 |
| Nemanja Bjelica | 72 | 67 | 27.9 | .481 | .419 | .821 | 6.4 | 2.8 | .9 | .6 | 11.5 |
| Buddy Hield | 72 | 44 | 30.8 | .429 | .394 | .846 | 4.6 | 3.0 | .9 | .2 | 19.2 |
| Cory Joseph | 72 | 26 | 24.4 | .415 | .352 | .857 | 2.6 | 3.5 | .7 | .3 | 6.4 |
| Bogdan Bogdanović | 61 | 28 | 29.0 | .440 | .372 | .741 | 3.4 | 3.4 | 1.0 | .2 | 15.1 |
| De'Aaron Fox | 51 | 49 | 32.0 | .480 | .292 | .705 | 3.8 | 6.8 | 1.5 | .5 | 21.1 |
| Yogi Ferrell | 50 | 0 | 10.6 | .420 | .304 | .857 | 1.0 | 1.4 | .4 | .1 | 4.4 |
| Harry Giles III | 46 | 17 | 14.5 | .554 | .000 | .776 | 4.1 | 1.3 | .5 | .4 | 6.9 |
| Richaun Holmes | 44 | 38 | 28.2 | .648 | | .788 | 8.1 | 1.0 | .9 | 1.3 | 12.3 |
| Justin James | 36 | 0 | 6.4 | .417 | .310 | .476 | .9 | .5 | .2 | .3 | 2.5 |
| Dewayne Dedmon^{†} | 34 | 10 | 15.9 | .404 | .197 | .821 | 4.9 | .4 | .4 | .8 | 5.1 |
| Trevor Ariza^{†} | 32 | 0 | 24.7 | .388 | .352 | .778 | 4.6 | 1.6 | 1.1 | .2 | 6.0 |
| Kent Bazemore^{†} | 25 | 0 | 23.1 | .418 | .384 | .733 | 4.9 | 1.3 | 1.2 | .4 | 10.3 |
| Alex Len^{†} | 15 | 3 | 15.0 | .593 | .667 | .708 | 6.1 | .5 | .2 | 1.0 | 5.9 |
| Marvin Bagley III | 13 | 6 | 25.7 | .467 | .182 | .806 | 7.5 | .8 | .5 | .9 | 14.2 |
| DaQuan Jeffries | 13 | 0 | 10.8 | .500 | .278 | .833 | 1.4 | .5 | .3 | .1 | 3.8 |
| Wenyen Gabriel^{†} | 11 | 0 | 5.5 | .353 | .125 | .600 | .9 | .3 | .3 | .2 | 1.7 |
| Anthony Tolliver^{†} | 9 | 0 | 9.1 | .176 | .133 | .500 | 1.2 | .3 | .4 | .1 | 1.0 |
| Caleb Swanigan^{†} | 7 | 0 | 3.3 | .500 | | .500 | 1.0 | .3 | .1 | .3 | .7 |
| Jabari Parker^{†} | 6 | 0 | 13.3 | .583 | .250 | .889 | 3.8 | 1.7 | .5 | .2 | 8.5 |
| Corey Brewer | 5 | 0 | 6.6 | .500 | .000 | .333 | 1.6 | .4 | .8 | .0 | 1.0 |
| Kyle Guy | 3 | 0 | 3.3 | .400 | .000 | | .3 | .3 | .0 | .0 | 1.3 |
| Eric Mika | 1 | 0 | 19.0 | .667 | | 1.000 | 7.0 | .0 | .0 | .0 | 6.0 |

- ^{†} Denotes player spent time with another team in the season. Stats reflect time with the Kings only.

== Transactions ==
=== Trades ===
| June 20, 2019 | To Sacramento Kings Draft rights to Kyle Guy (#55); Cash considerations | To New York Knicks Ignas Brazdeikis (#47) |

=== Free agency ===
==== Additions ====
| Player | Signed | Former team | Ref |
|---|---|---|---|
| Cory Joseph | July 6, 2019 | Indiana Pacers | |
| Trevor Ariza | July 7, 2019 | Washington Wizards | |
| Harrison Barnes* | July 8, 2019 | Sacramento Kings | |
| Dewayne Dedmon | July 8, 2019 | Atlanta Hawks | |
| Richaun Holmes | July 15, 2019 | Phoenix Suns | |
| Tyler Lydon | July 17, 2019 | Denver Nuggets | |

==== Subtractions ====
| Player | Reason left | New team | Ref |
|---|---|---|---|
| Willie Cauley-Stein | Free Agency | Golden State Warriors | |
| Alec Burks | Free Agency | Golden State Warriors | |
| Frank Mason III | Waived | Milwaukee Bucks | |
