= 2019–20 Cleveland Cavaliers season =

NBA professional basketball team season

- Head coach: John Beilein (resigned); J. B. Bickerstaff
- General manager: Koby Altman
- Owners: Dan Gilbert
- Arena: Rocket Mortgage FieldHouse

Results
- Record: 19–46 (.292)
- Place: Division: 5th (Central); Conference: 15th (Eastern)
- Playoff finish: Did not qualify
- Stats at Basketball Reference

Local media
- Television: Fox Sports Ohio
- Radio: WTAM · WMMS

The 2019–20 Cleveland Cavaliers season was the 50th season of the franchise in the National Basketball Association (NBA). The Cavaliers replaced Larry Drew, with former Michigan Wolverines men's basketball coach John Beilein on May 13.

On February 19, 2020, after beginning the season with a 14–40 record, Beilein resigned as head coach after only 54 games at the helm. J. B. Bickerstaff, who served as an assistant coach and associate head coach, was named head coach.

The season was suspended by the league officials following the games of March 11 after it was reported that Rudy Gobert of the Utah Jazz tested positive for COVID-19. On June 4, it was announced that the NBA had approved a return to play for 22 teams in the NBA Bubble. The Cavaliers, with the league's second-worst record at the time of the season's suspension, were not among them, effectively ending the team's season. The Cavaliers finished with a 19–46 record, which is the equivalent of a 24–58 record in a traditional 82-game season.

== Draft ==
Round	Pick	Player	Position	Nationality	College / Club
1	5	Darius Garland	PG	United States	Vanderbilt
1	26	Dylan Windler	SG/SF	United States	Belmont

The Cavaliers held two first-round draft picks, including the fifth pick earned from the lottery. With the fifth pick of the draft, the Cavaliers selected point guard Darius Garland from Vanderbilt University.

== Roster ==
2019–20 Cleveland Cavaliers roster
Players

Pos.	No.	Player	Height	Weight	DOB	From
PG	18	Matthew Dellavedova	6 ft 3 in (1.91 m)	200 lb (91 kg)	1990–09–08	Saint Mary's
C	3	Andre Drummond	6 ft 10 in (2.08 m)	279 lb (127 kg)	1993–08–10	Connecticut
SG	1	Dante Exum	6 ft 5 in (1.96 m)	214 lb (97 kg)	1995–07–13	Australia
PG	10	Darius Garland	6 ft 1 in (1.85 m)	192 lb (87 kg)	2000–01–26	Vanderbilt
PF	0	Kevin Love	6 ft 10 in (2.08 m)	251 lb (114 kg)	1988–09–07	UCLA
SF	28	Alfonzo McKinnie	6 ft 7 in (2.01 m)	215 lb (98 kg)	1992–09–17	Green Bay
PG	31	Matt Mooney (TW)	6 ft 2 in (1.88 m)	199 lb (90 kg)	1995–02–07	Texas Tech
PF	22	Larry Nance	6 ft 7 in (2.01 m)	245 lb (111 kg)	1993–01–01	Wyoming
SF	16	Cedi Osman	6 ft 7 in (2.01 m)	230 lb (104 kg)	1995–04–08	Turkey
SG	15	Sir'Dominic Pointer	6 ft 6 in (1.98 m)	192 lb (87 kg)	1992–05–06	St. John's
SG	4	Kevin Porter	6 ft 4 in (1.93 m)	203 lb (92 kg)	2000–05–04	USC
PG	2	Collin Sexton	6 ft 1 in (1.85 m)	190 lb (86 kg)	1999–01–04	Alabama
C	13	Tristan Thompson	6 ft 9 in (2.06 m)	254 lb (115 kg)	1991–03–13	Texas
PF	32	Dean Wade	6 ft 9 in (2.06 m)	228 lb (103 kg)	1996–11–20	Kansas State
SG	9	Dylan Windler	6 ft 6 in (1.98 m)	196 lb (89 kg)	1996–09–22	Belmont
C	41	Ante Žižić	6 ft 11 in (2.11 m)	266 lb (121 kg)	1997–01–04	Croatia

Coaches
Head coach
- J. B. Bickerstaff
Assistant(s)
- Dan Geriot
- Lindsay Gottlieb
- Antonio Lang

Legend
- (DP) Unsigned draft pick
- (FA) Free agent
- (S) Suspended
- (GL) On assignment to G League affiliate
- (TW) Two-way affiliate player
- (L) On leave from the team
- Injured

Roster
Updated: 2020–06–30

== Standings ==
=== Division ===
Central Division	W	L	PCT	GB	Home	Road	Div	GP
z – Milwaukee Bucks	56	17	.767	–	30‍–‍5	26‍–‍12	13–1	73
x – Indiana Pacers	45	28	.616	11.0	25‍–‍11	20‍–‍17	8–7	73
Chicago Bulls	22	43	.338	30.0	14‍–‍20	8‍–‍23	7–9	65
Detroit Pistons	20	46	.303	32.5	11‍–‍22	9‍–‍24	5–10	66
Cleveland Cavaliers	19	46	.292	33.0	11‍–‍25	8‍–‍21	4–10	65

=== Conference ===
Eastern Conference
#	Team	W	L	PCT	GB	GP
1	z – Milwaukee Bucks *	56	17	.767	–	73
2	y – Toronto Raptors *	53	19	.736	2.5	72
3	x – Boston Celtics	48	24	.667	7.5	72
4	x – Indiana Pacers	45	28	.616	11.0	73
5	y – Miami Heat *	44	29	.603	12.0	73
6	x – Philadelphia 76ers	43	30	.589	13.0	73
7	x – Brooklyn Nets	35	37	.486	20.5	72
8	x – Orlando Magic	33	40	.452	23.0	73
9	Washington Wizards	25	47	.347	30.5	72
10	Charlotte Hornets	23	42	.354	29.0	65
11	Chicago Bulls	22	43	.338	30.0	65
12	New York Knicks	21	45	.318	31.5	66
13	Detroit Pistons	20	46	.303	32.5	66
14	Atlanta Hawks	20	47	.299	33.0	67
15	Cleveland Cavaliers	19	46	.292	33.0	65

== Game log ==
=== Preseason ===
2019 preseason game log
Total: 1–3 (Home: 1–1; Road: 0–2)
Preseason: 1–3 (home: 1–1; road: 0–2)

Game	Date	Team	Score	High points	High rebounds	High assists	Location Attendance	Record
1	October 7	San Lorenzo	W 120–89	Jordan Clarkson (17)	Tristan Thompson (10)	Cedi Osman (5)	Rocket Mortgage FieldHouse; 9,902	1–0
2	October 11	@ Detroit	L 105–109	Collin Sexton (24)	Larry Nance Jr. (11)	Collin Sexton (4)	Little Caesars Arena; 13,925	1–1
3	October 13	@ Boston	L 72–118	Sindarius Thornwell (12)	Jarell Martin (9)	Collin Sexton (3)	TD Garden; 18,624	1–2
4	October 15	Boston	L 95–118	Collin Sexton (20)	Jarell Martin (9)	Matthew Dellavedova (5)	Rocket Mortgage FieldHouse; 12,398	1–3

2019–20 season schedule

=== Regular season ===
2019–20 game log
Total: 19–46 (Home: 11–25; Road: 8–21)
October: 2–2 (home: 2–0; road: 0–2)

Game	Date	Team	Score	High points	High rebounds	High assists	Location Attendance	Record
1	October 23	@ Orlando	L 85–94	Thompson, Sexton (16)	Kevin Love (18)	Darius Garland (5)	Amway Center; 18,846	0–1
2	October 26	Indiana	W 110–99	Tristan Thompson (25)	Thompson, Love (13)	Kevin Love (9)	Rocket Mortgage FieldHouse; 19,432	1–1
3	October 28	@ Milwaukee	L 112–129	Collin Sexton (18)	Kevin Love (16)	Thompson, Clarkson (4)	Fiserv Forum; 17,385	1–2
4	October 30	Chicago	W 117–111	Tristan Thompson (23)	Kevin Love (20)	Kevin Love (6)	Rocket Mortgage FieldHouse; 17,595	2–2

November : 3–12 (home: 1–7; road: 2–5)

Game	Date	Team	Score	High points	High rebounds	High assists	Location Attendance	Record
5	November 1	@ Indiana	L 95–102	Kevin Love (22)	Kevin Love (17)	Jordan Clarkson (5)	Bankers Life Fieldhouse; 16,079	2–3
6	November 3	Dallas	L 111–131	Kevin Love (29)	Tristan Thompson (12)	Brandon Knight (6)	Rocket Mortgage FieldHouse; 18,078	2–4
7	November 5	Boston	L 113–119	Collin Sexton (21)	Tristan Thompson (13)	Thompson, Clarkson (4)	Rocket Mortgage FieldHouse; 17,709	2–5
8	November 8	@ Washington	W 113–100	Tristan Thompson (21)	Love, Thompson (12)	Darius Garland (6)	Capital One Arena; 16,946	3–5
9	November 10	@ New York	W 108–87	Collin Sexton (31)	Nance Jr., Thompson (9)	Darius Garland (6)	Madison Square Garden; 19,812	4–5
10	November 12	@ Philadelphia	L 97–98	Love, Clarkson (20)	Tristan Thompson (12)	Collin Sexton (4)	Wells Fargo Center; 20,294	4–6
11	November 14	Miami	L 97–108	Kevin Love (21)	Kevin Love (10)	Porter Jr., Dellavedova (4)	Rocket Mortgage FieldHouse; 17,374	4–7
12	November 17	Philadelphia	L 95–114	Collin Sexton (17)	Tristan Thompson (9)	Thompson, Clarkson (3)	Rocket Mortgage FieldHouse; 19,432	4–8
13	November 18	@ New York	L 105–123	Kevin Porter Jr. (18)	Cedi Osman (8)	Jordan Clarkson (4)	Madison Square Garden; 17,097	4–9
14	November 20	@ Miami	L 100–124	Kevin Love (25)	Kevin Love (13)	Matthew Dellavedova (5)	American Airlines Arena; 19,600	4–10
15	November 22	@ Dallas	L 101–143	Darius Garland (23)	Tristan Thompson (8)	Collin Sexton (5)	American Airlines Center; 19,639	4–11
16	November 23	Portland	W 110–104	Jordan Clarkson (28)	Osman, Nance Jr. (12)	Cedi Osman (5)	Rocket Mortgage FieldHouse; 19,432	5–11
17	November 25	Brooklyn	L 106–108	Jordan Clarkson (23)	Larry Nance Jr. (13)	Kevin Porter Jr. (7)	Rocket Mortgage FieldHouse; 17,143	5–12
18	November 27	Orlando	L 104–116	Collin Sexton (20)	Tristan Thompson (15)	Collin Sexton (6)	Rocket Mortgage FieldHouse; 17,712	5–13
19	November 29	Milwaukee	L 110–119	Darius Garland (21)	Tristan Thompson (13)	Kevin Love (7)	Rocket Mortgage FieldHouse; 19,432	5–14

December : 5–9 (home: 3–3; road: 2–6)

Game	Date	Team	Score	High points	High rebounds	High assists	Location Attendance	Record
20	December 3	Detroit	L 94–127	Collin Sexton (22)	Tristan Thompson (14)	Larry Nance Jr. (5)	Rocket Mortgage FieldHouse; 17,504	5–15
21	December 6	Orlando	L 87–93	Collin Sexton (19)	Larry Nance Jr. (11)	Tristan Thompson (5)	Rocket Mortgage FieldHouse; 18,446	5–16
22	December 7	@ Philadelphia	L 94–141	Darius Garland (17)	Kevin Love (7)	Thompson, Porter Jr. (4)	Wells Fargo Center; 20,844	5–17
23	December 9	@ Boston	L 88–110	Jordan Clarkson (19)	Tristan Thompson (11)	Matthew Dellavedova (4)	TD Garden; 19,156	5–18
24	December 11	Houston	L 110–116	Kevin Porter Jr. (24)	Kevin Love (11)	Cedi Osman (7)	Rocket Mortgage FieldHouse; 17,122	5–19
25	December 12	@ San Antonio	W 117–109 (OT)	Kevin Love (30)	Kevin Love (17)	Darius Garland (5)	AT&T Center; 18,354	6–19
26	December 14	@ Milwaukee	L 108–125	Kevin Porter Jr. (15)	Kevin Love (10)	Darius Garland (5)	Fiserv Forum; 17,481	6–20
27	December 16	@ Toronto	L 113–133	Collin Sexton (25)	Tristan Thompson (8)	Garland, Henson (5)	Scotiabank Arena; 19,800	6–21
28	December 18	Charlotte	W 100–98	Collin Sexton (23)	Kevin Love (14)	Kevin Love (7)	Rocket Mortgage FieldHouse; 17,023	7–21
29	December 20	Memphis	W 114–107	Jordan Clarkson (33)	Tristan Thompson (15)	Matthew Dellavedova (8)	Rocket Mortgage FieldHouse; 19,432	8–21
30	December 23	Atlanta	W 121–118	Collin Sexton (25)	Tristan Thompson (10)	Kevin Love (5)	Rocket Mortgage FieldHouse; 18,007	9–21
31	December 27	@ Boston	L 117–129	Kevin Love (30)	Thompson, Love (7)	Matthew Dellavedova (6)	TD Garden; 19,156	9–22
32	December 28	@ Minnesota	W 94–88	Garland, Sexton (18)	Tristan Thompson (15)	Garland, Thompson (3)	Target Center; 15,411	10–22
33	December 31	@ Toronto	L 97–117	Collin Sexton (22)	Thompson, Love (11)	Garland, Osman, Porter Jr. (4)	Scotiabank Arena; 19,800	10–23

January : 3–13 (home: 0–9; road: 3–4)

Game	Date	Team	Score	High points	High rebounds	High assists	Location Attendance	Record
34	January 2	Charlotte	L 106–109	Collin Sexton (21)	Tristan Thompson (11)	Darius Garland (8)	Rocket Mortgage FieldHouse; 17,859	10–24
35	January 4	Oklahoma City	L 106–121	Collin Sexton (30)	Tristan Thompson (14)	Darius Garland (7)	Rocket Mortgage FieldHouse; 19,432	10–25
36	January 5	Minnesota	L 103–118	Dante Exum (28)	Ante Žižić (12)	Knight, Henson (3)	Rocket Mortgage FieldHouse; 16,159	10–26
37	January 7	Detroit	L 113–115	Kevin Love (30)	Tristan Thompson (15)	Matthew Dellavedova (9)	Rocket Mortgage FieldHouse; 17,274	10–27
38	January 9	@ Detroit	W 115–112 (OT)	Tristan Thompson (35)	Tristan Thompson (14)	Darius Garland (7)	Little Caesars Arena; 13,445	11–27
39	January 11	@ Denver	W 111–103	Collin Sexton (25)	Kevin Love (15)	Darius Garland (8)	Pepsi Center; 19,533	12–27
40	January 13	@ L. A. Lakers	L 99–128	Kevin Love (21)	Kevin Love (11)	Garland, Sexton (4)	Staples Center; 18,997	12–28
41	January 14	@ L. A. Clippers	L 103–128	Collin Sexton (25)	Thompson, Wade (8)	Darius Garland (10)	Staples Center; 19,068	12–29
42	January 17	@ Memphis	L 109–113	Collin Sexton (28)	Alfonzo McKinnie (10)	Garland, Sexton (6)	FedExForum; 17,102	12–30
43	January 18	@ Chicago	L 116–118	Kevin Love (29)	Tristan Thompson (8)	Kevin Love (6)	United Center; 19,939	12–31
44	January 20	New York	L 86–106	Collin Sexton (17)	Tristan Thompson (22)	Collin Sexton (4)	Rocket Mortgage FieldHouse; 17,133	12–32
45	January 23	Washington	L 112–124	Collin Sexton (29)	Larry Nance Jr. (12)	Cedi Osman (5)	Rocket Mortgage FieldHouse; 16,689	12–33
46	January 25	Chicago	L 106–118	Kevin Love (20)	Love, Nance Jr. (11)	Thompson, Osman (6)	Rocket Mortgage FieldHouse; 19,432	12–34
47	January 27	@ Detroit	W 115–100	Collin Sexton (23)	Tristan Thompson (11)	Collin Sexton (5)	Little Caesars Arena; 12,597	13–34
48	January 28	New Orleans	L 111–125	Collin Sexton (24)	Larry Nance Jr. (11)	Larry Nance Jr. (7)	Rocket Mortgage FieldHouse; 19,432	13–35
49	January 30	Toronto	L 109–115	Love, Sexton (23)	Tristan Thompson (12)	Darius Garland (8)	Rocket Mortgage FieldHouse; 17,695	13–36

February : 4–7 (home: 3–4; road: 1–3)

Game	Date	Team	Score	High points	High rebounds	High assists	Location Attendance	Record
50	February 1	Golden State	L 112–131	Collin Sexton (23)	Love, Thompson (11)	Kevin Love (5)	Rocket Mortgage FieldHouse; 18,410	13–37
51	February 3	New York	L 134–139 (OT)	Kevin Love (33)	Kevin Love (13)	Collin Sexton (7)	Rocket Mortgage FieldHouse; 16,303	13–38
52	February 5	@ Oklahoma City	L 103–109	Collin Sexton (23)	John Henson (11)	Darius Garland (6)	Chesapeake Energy Arena; 18,203	13–39
53	February 9	L. A. Clippers	L 92–133	Andre Drummond (19)	Andre Drummond (14)	Darius Garland (6)	Rocket Mortgage FieldHouse; 17,240	13–40
54	February 12	Atlanta	W 127–105	Tristan Thompson (27)	Andre Drummond (15)	Darius Garland (7)	Rocket Mortgage FieldHouse; 16,200	14–40
55	February 21	@ Washington	W 113–108	Collin Sexton (25)	Andre Drummond (12)	Garland, Thompson (4)	Capital One Arena; 18,895	15–40
56	February 22	@ Miami	L 105–124	Cedi Osman (19)	Dante Exum (8)	Collin Sexton (9)	American Airlines Arena; 19,754	15–41
57	February 24	Miami	W 125–119 (OT)	Kevin Porter Jr. (30)	Kevin Love (14)	Darius Garland (7)	Rocket Mortgage FieldHouse; 17,336	16–41
58	February 26	Philadelphia	W 108–94	Collin Sexton (28)	Larry Nance Jr. (15)	Love, Porter Jr. (6)	Rocket Mortgage FieldHouse; 16,332	17–41
59	February 28	@ New Orleans	L 104–116	Collin Sexton (31)	Kevin Love (7)	Matthew Dellavedova (6)	Smoothie King Center; 18,304	17–42
60	February 29	Indiana	L 104–113	Andre Drummond (27)	Andre Drummond (13)	Kevin Love (7)	Rocket Mortgage FieldHouse; 19,432	17–43

March: 2–3 (home: 2–2; road: 0–1)

Game	Date	Team	Score	High points	High rebounds	High assists	Location Attendance	Record
61	March 2	Utah	L 113–126	Collin Sexton (32)	Kevin Love (9)	Matthew Dellavedova (9)	Rocket Mortgage FieldHouse; 15,453	17–44
62	March 4	Boston	L 106–112	Collin Sexton (41)	Larry Nance Jr. (15)	Collin Sexton (6)	Rocket Mortgage FieldHouse; 16,897	17–45
63	March 7	Denver	W 104–102	Kevin Love (27)	Tristan Thompson (13)	Matthew Dellavedova (14)	Rocket Mortgage FieldHouse; 19,432	18–45
64	March 8	San Antonio	W 132–129 (OT)	Andre Drummond (28)	Kevin Love (18)	Matthew Dellavedova (11)	Rocket Mortgage FieldHouse; 17,995	19–45
65	March 10	@ Chicago	L 103–108	Collin Sexton (26)	Kevin Love (8)	Matthew Dellavedova (8)	United Center; 17,837	19–46

Cancelled games

Game	Date	Team	Score	High points	High rebounds	High assists	Location Attendance	Record
66	March 13	@ Charlotte					Spectrum Center	
67	March 14	@ Atlanta					State Farm Arena	
68	March 17	@ Houston					Toyota Center	
69	March 19	@ Orlando					Amway Center	
70	March 21	@ Indiana					Bankers Life Fieldhouse	
71	March 24	Sacramento					Rocket Mortgage FieldHouse	
72	March 26	LA Lakers					Rocket Mortgage FieldHouse	
73	March 28	@ Brooklyn					Barclays Center	
74	March 30	Phoenix					Rocket Mortgage FieldHouse	
75	April 1	@ Utah					Vivint Smart Home Arena	
76	April 3	@ Phoenix					Talking Stick Resort Arena	
77	April 5	@ Sacramento					Golden 1 Center	
78	April 7	@ Portland					Moda Center	
79	April 8	@ Golden State					Chase Center	
80	April 11	Milwaukee					Rocket Mortgage FieldHouse	
81	April 13	Brooklyn					Rocket Mortgage FieldHouse	
82	April 15	@ Atlanta					State Farm Arena	

2019–20 season schedule

== Player statistics ==
Legend
GP	Games played	GS	Games started	MPG	Minutes per game
FG%	Field-goal percentage	3P%	3-point field-goal percentage	FT%	Free-throw percentage
RPG	Rebounds per game	APG	Assists per game	SPG	Steals per game
BPG	Blocks per game	PPG	Points per game

=== Regular season ===
Player	GP	GS	MPG	FG%	3P%	FT%	RPG	APG	SPG	BPG	PPG
Collin Sexton	65	65	33.0	.472	.380	.846	3.1	3.0	1.0	.1	20.8
Cedi Osman	65	65	29.4	.437	.383	.670	3.6	2.4	.8	.2	11.0
Darius Garland	59	59	30.9	.401	.355	.875	1.9	3.9	.7	.1	12.3
Tristan Thompson	57	51	30.2	.512	.391	.615	10.1	2.1	.6	.9	12.0
Matthew Dellavedova	57	4	14.4	.354	.231	.865	1.3	3.2	.4	.0	3.1
Kevin Love	56	56	31.8	.450	.374	.854	9.8	3.2	.6	.3	17.6
Larry Nance Jr.	56	10	26.3	.531	.352	.676	7.3	2.2	1.0	.4	10.1
Kevin Porter Jr.	50	3	23.2	.442	.335	.723	3.2	2.2	.9	.3	10.0
Alfonzo McKinnie	40	1	14.8	.427	.215	.710	2.8	.4	.6	.2	4.6
John Henson^{†}	29	2	14.2	.508	.194	.515	3.9	1.5	.6	1.1	5.0
Jordan Clarkson^{†}	29	0	23.0	.442	.371	.884	2.4	2.4	.6	.3	14.6
Danté Exum^{†}	24	1	16.8	.479	.351	.732	2.3	1.4	.5	.3	5.6
Ante Žižić	22	0	10.0	.569		.737	3.0	.3	.3	.2	4.4
Brandon Knight^{†}	16	0	15.1	.326	.297	.308	1.3	1.9	.3	.1	4.9
Dean Wade	12	0	5.9	.692	.500	.000	1.6	.2	.2	.3	1.7
Tyler Cook^{†}	11	0	3.2	.700		.833	.9	.1	.1	.0	1.7
Andre Drummond^{†}	8	8	28.1	.552	.286	.513	11.1	1.8	1.5	1.4	17.5
Matt Mooney	4	0	4.8	.250	.000		.8	.3	.5	.3	.5
Malik Newman	1	0	4.0	.000	.000	1.000	.0	.0	.0	.0	2.0
Marques Bolden	1	0	3.0				2.0	.0	1.0	.0	.0
J. P. Macura	1	0	1.0				.0	.0	.0	.0	.0

- ^{†} Denotes player spent time with another team in the season. Stats reflect time with the Cavaliers only.

== Transactions ==
=== Trades ===
December 23, 2019	To Cleveland Cavaliers Dante Exum; 2022 second-round pick (from SAS); 2023 second-round pick (from GSW)	To Utah Jazz Jordan Clarkson
February 6, 2020	To Cleveland Cavaliers Andre Drummond	To Detroit Pistons John Henson; Brandon Knight; 2023 second-round pick

=== Free agency ===
==== Re-signed ====
Player	Signed

==== Additions ====
Player	Signed	Former team
Dylan Windler	July 2, 2019	Belmont Bruins
Darius Garland	July 2, 2019	Vanderbilt Commodores
Kevin Porter Jr.	July 3, 2019	USC Trojans
Dean Wade	July 9, 2019	Kansas State
Levi Randolph	August 6, 2019	(France) SIG Strasbourg
Malik Newman	August 6, 2019	Canton Charge
Jarell Martin	August 16, 2019	Orlando Magic
Alex Robinson	August 23, 2019	TCU Horned Frogs
J.P. Macura	September 3, 2019	Charlotte Hornets
Daniel Hamilton	September 3, 2019	Erie BayHawks
Jordan Bell	June 29, 2020	Capital City Go-Go

==== Subtractions ====
Player	Reason left	New team
J.R. Smith	Waived	Los Angeles Lakers
