= 2019–20 Utah Jazz season =

NBA professional basketball team season

- Head coach: Quin Snyder
- General manager: Justin Zanik
- Arena: Vivint Arena

Results
- Record: 44–28 (.611)
- Place: Division: 3rd (Northwest); Conference: 6th (Western)
- Playoff finish: First round (lost to Nuggets 3–4)
- Stats at Basketball Reference

Local media
- Television: AT&T SportsNet Rocky Mountain
- Radio: 1280; 97.5 The Zone

The 2019–20 Utah Jazz season was the 46th season of the franchise in the National Basketball Association (NBA), and the 41st season of the franchise in Salt Lake City. It was announced that longtime Memphis Grizzlies point guard Mike Conley was traded to the Jazz after spending his first 12 seasons in the league with the Grizzlies. During the offseason Dennis Lindsey was promoted from General Manager to Executive Vice President of Basketball Operations, while Assistant Justin Zanik was promoted to General Manager.

The season was indefinitely suspended by the league officials following the games of March 11, 2020 after it was reported that Rudy Gobert tested positive for COVID-19. A day later, on March 12, it was revealed that Donovan Mitchell had also tested positive for the virus. Before this, Gobert and Mitchell were selected to play in the 2020 All-Star Game in Chicago.

On June 4, the Jazz clinched a playoff berth for the fourth straight season, after the NBA approved a plan to return to play in the NBA Bubble with only 22 teams in late July.

In the playoffs, the Jazz lost to the Denver Nuggets in the first round in seven games after leading the series 3–1.

== Draft picks ==
Round	Pick	Player	Position	Nationality	College
1	23	Darius Bazley	SF	United States	Princeton HS
2	53	Justin Wright-Foreman	PG	United States	Hofstra

The Jazz held a first and a second-round draft pick entering the 2019 NBA Draft. On the night before the 2019 NBA draft began, the Jazz agreed to trade their first-round pick at #23 (which became forward Darius Bazley), a protected 2020 first-round pick, Grayson Allen, Jae Crowder, and Kyle Korver to the Memphis Grizzlies in exchange for long-standing point guard Mike Conley Jr., although the trade was not official until July 6 due to salary cap reasons.

On the night of the draft, the Jazz selected point guard Justin Wright-Foreman from Hofstra University. They also traded their 2021 second-round pick and cash considerations to the Indiana Pacers for their 50th pick of the draft, which became power forward Jarrell Brantley from the College of Charleston. Both Wright-Foreman and Brantley signed two-way contracts with Utah on July 16. Utah also traded away some cash considerations to the Golden State Warriors on June 20 to acquire the 58th pick of the draft, shooting guard Miye Oni from Yale University.

== Roster ==
2019–20 Utah Jazz roster
Players

Pos.	No.	Player	Height	Weight	DOB	From
F	44	Bojan Bogdanović	6 ft 8 in (2.03 m)	226 lb (103 kg)	1989–04–18	Croatia
F/C	13	Tony Bradley	6 ft 10 in (2.08 m)	248 lb (112 kg)	1998–01–08	North Carolina
F	5	Jarrell Brantley (TW)	6 ft 5 in (1.96 m)	250 lb (113 kg)	1996–06–07	College of Charleston
G	00	Jordan Clarkson	6 ft 4 in (1.93 m)	194 lb (88 kg)	1992–06–07	Missouri
G	10	Mike Conley	6 ft 1 in (1.85 m)	175 lb (79 kg)	1987–10–11	Ohio State
F/C	17	Ed Davis	6 ft 9 in (2.06 m)	218 lb (99 kg)	1989–06–05	North Carolina
C	27	Rudy Gobert	7 ft 1 in (2.16 m)	258 lb (117 kg)	1992–06–26	France
G/F	2	Joe Ingles	6 ft 7 in (2.01 m)	220 lb (100 kg)	1987–10–02	Australia
G	45	Donovan Mitchell	6 ft 2 in (1.88 m)	215 lb (98 kg)	1996–09–07	Louisville
F	16	Juwan Morgan	6 ft 7 in (2.01 m)	232 lb (105 kg)	1997–04–17	Indiana
G	15	Emmanuel Mudiay	6 ft 3 in (1.91 m)	200 lb (91 kg)	1996–03–05	Prime Prep Academy (TX)
F	31	Georges Niang	6 ft 7 in (2.01 m)	230 lb (104 kg)	1993–06–17	Iowa State
F	23	Royce O'Neale	6 ft 4 in (1.93 m)	226 lb (103 kg)	1993–06–05	Baylor
G/F	81	Miye Oni	6 ft 5 in (1.96 m)	206 lb (93 kg)	1997–08–04	Yale
G	6	Rayjon Tucker	6 ft 3 in (1.91 m)	209 lb (95 kg)	1997–09–24	Little Rock
G	0	Nigel Williams-Goss	6 ft 2 in (1.88 m)	190 lb (86 kg)	1994–09–16	Gonzaga
G	3	Justin Wright-Foreman (TW)	6 ft 0 in (1.83 m)	190 lb (86 kg)	1997–10–27	Hofstra

Coaches
Head coach
- Quin Snyder
Assistant(s)
- Johnnie Bryant
- Alex Jensen
- Mike Wells

Legend
- (DP) Unsigned draft pick
- (FA) Free agent
- (S) Suspended
- (GL) On assignment to G League affiliate
- (TW) Two-way affiliate player
- Injured

Roster
Updated: 2020–01–30

== Standings ==
=== Division ===
Northwest Division	W	L	PCT	GB	Home	Road	Div	GP
y – Denver Nuggets	46	27	.630	–	26‍–‍11	20‍–‍16	12–2	73
x – Oklahoma City Thunder	44	28	.611	1.5	23‍–‍14	21‍–‍14	8–5	72
x – Utah Jazz	44	28	.611	1.5	23‍–‍12	21‍–‍16	5–7	72
x – Portland Trail Blazers	35	39	.473	11.5	21‍–‍15	14‍–‍24	5–8	74
Minnesota Timberwolves	19	45	.297	22.5	8‍–‍24	11‍–‍21	2–10	64

=== Conference ===
Western Conference
#	Team	W	L	PCT	GB	GP
1	c – Los Angeles Lakers *	52	19	.732	–	71
2	x – Los Angeles Clippers	49	23	.681	3.5	72
3	y – Denver Nuggets *	46	27	.630	7.0	73
4	y – Houston Rockets *	44	28	.611	8.5	72
5	x – Oklahoma City Thunder	44	28	.611	8.5	72
6	x – Utah Jazz	44	28	.611	8.5	72
7	x – Dallas Mavericks	43	32	.573	11.0	75
8	x – Portland Trail Blazers	35	39	.473	18.5	74
9	pi – Memphis Grizzlies	34	39	.466	19.0	73
10	Phoenix Suns	34	39	.466	19.0	73
11	San Antonio Spurs	32	39	.451	20.0	71
12	Sacramento Kings	31	41	.431	21.5	72
13	New Orleans Pelicans	30	42	.417	22.5	72
14	Minnesota Timberwolves	19	45	.297	29.5	64
15	Golden State Warriors	15	50	.231	34.0	65

== Game log ==
=== Regular season ===
2019–20 game log
Total: 44–28 (home: 23–12; road: 21–16)
October: 4–1 (home: 3–0; road: 1–1)

Game	Date	Team	Score	High points	High rebounds	High assists	Location Attendance	Record
1	October 23	Oklahoma City	W 100–95	Donovan Mitchell (32)	Rudy Gobert (14)	Conley Jr., Mudiay (5)	Vivint Smart Home Arena; 18,306	1–0
2	October 25	@ L. A. Lakers	L 86–95	Donovan Mitchell (24)	Rudy Gobert (9)	Joe Ingles (4)	Staples Center; 18,997	1–1
3	October 26	Sacramento	W 113–81	Bojan Bogdanovic (26)	Ed Davis (7)	Mike Conley Jr. (8)	Vivint Smart Home Arena; 18,306	2–1
4	October 28	@ Phoenix	W 96–95	Bojan Bogdanovic (29)	Rudy Gobert (18)	Joe Ingles (5)	Talking Stick Resort Arena; 14,805	3–1
5	October 30	L. A. Clippers	W 110–96	Mike Conley Jr. (29)	Ed Davis (9)	Joe Ingles (7)	Vivint Smart Home Arena; 18,306	4–1

November: 8–6 (home: 5–1; road: 3–5)

Game	Date	Team	Score	High points	High rebounds	High assists	Location Attendance	Record
6	November 1	@ Sacramento	L 101–102	Donovan Mitchell (24)	Rudy Gobert (16)	Conley Jr., O'Neale (4)	Golden 1 Center; 16,273	4–2
7	November 3	@ L. A. Clippers	L 94–105	Donovan Mitchell (36)	Rudy Gobert (14)	Donovan Mitchell (6)	Staples Center; 19,068	4–3
8	November 6	Philadelphia	W 106–104	Donovan Mitchell (24)	Rudy Gobert (16)	Donovan Mitchell (8)	Vivint Smart Home Arena; 18,306	5–3
9	November 8	Milwaukee	W 103–100	Bojan Bogdanovic (33)	Rudy Gobert (17)	Donovan Mitchell (6)	Vivint Smart Home Arena; 18,306	6–3
10	November 11	@ Golden State	W 122–108	Rudy Gobert (25)	Rudy Gobert (14)	Conley Jr., Ingles (7)	Chase Center; 18,064	7–3
11	November 12	Brooklyn	W 119–114	Donovan Mitchell (30)	Rudy Gobert (15)	Mike Conley Jr. (5)	Vivint Smart Home Arena; 18,306	8–3
12	November 15	@ Memphis	L 106–107	Donovan Mitchell (29)	Rudy Gobert (17)	Donovan Mitchell (5)	FedExForum; 16,422	8–4
13	November 18	Minnesota	L 102–112	Bojan Bogdanovic (18)	Rudy Gobert (14)	Mike Conley Jr. (6)	Vivint Smart Home Arena; 18,306	8–5
14	November 20	@ Minnesota	W 103–95	Bojan Bogdanovic (30)	Rudy Gobert (15)	Mike Conley Jr. (8)	Target Center; 13,177	9–5
15	November 22	Golden State	W 113–109	Donovan Mitchell (30)	Rudy Gobert (19)	Royce O'Neale (5)	Vivint Smart Home Arena; 18,306	10–5
16	November 23	New Orleans	W 128–120	Donovan Mitchell (37)	Tony Bradley (9)	Royce O'Neale (6)	Vivint Smart Home Arena; 18,306	11–5
17	November 25	@ Milwaukee	L 118–122	Bojan Bogdanovic (24)	Rudy Gobert (11)	Mike Conley Jr. (9)	Fiserv Forum; 17,385	11–6
18	November 27	@ Indiana	L 102–121	Bojan Bogdanovic (30)	Rudy Gobert (13)	Mike Conley Jr. (5)	Bankers Life Fieldhouse; 17,027	11–7
19	November 29	@ Memphis	W 103–94	Bojan Bogdanovic (33)	Rudy Gobert (13)	Conley Jr., O'Neale (4)	FedExForum; 16,605	12–7

December: 9–5 (home: 6–2; road: 3–3)

Game	Date	Team	Score	High points	High rebounds	High assists	Location Attendance	Record
20	December 1	@ Toronto	L 110–130	Mike Conley Jr. (20)	Rudy Gobert (11)	Royce O'Neale (5)	Scotiabank Arena; 18,132	12–8
21	December 2	@ Philadelphia	L 94–103	Rudy Gobert (27)	Rudy Gobert (12)	Joe Ingles (8)	Wells Fargo Center; 20,208	12–9
22	December 4	L. A. Lakers	L 96–121	Donovan Mitchell (29)	Rudy Gobert (10)	Mitchell, Ingles (5)	Vivint Smart Home Arena; 18,306	12–10
23	December 7	Memphis	W 126–112	Donovan Mitchell (22)	Rudy Gobert (11)	Joe Ingles (10)	Vivint Smart Home Arena; 18,306	13–10
24	December 9	Oklahoma City	L 90–104	Donovan Mitchell (26)	Rudy Gobert (17)	Joe Ingles (8)	Vivint Smart Home Arena; 18,306	13–11
25	December 11	@ Minnesota	W 127–116	Donovan Mitchell (30)	Rudy Gobert (16)	Donovan Mitchell (6)	Target Center; 12,369	14–11
26	December 13	Golden State	W 114–106	Bojan Bogdanovic (32)	Rudy Gobert (15)	Joe Ingles (8)	Vivint Smart Home Arena; 18,306	15–11
27	December 17	Orlando	W 109–102	Bogdanovic, Mitchell (30)	Rudy Gobert (19)	Mike Conley Jr. (6)	Vivint Smart Home Arena; 18,306	16–11
28	December 19	@ Atlanta	W 111–106	Donovan Mitchell (30)	Rudy Gobert (13)	Mitchell, Ingles (5)	State Farm Arena; 16,739	17–11
29	December 21	@ Charlotte	W 114–107	Bojan Bogdanović (26)	Rudy Gobert (19)	Donovan Mitchell (9)	Spectrum Center; 16,187	18–11
30	December 23	@ Miami	L 104–107	Joe Ingles (27)	Rudy Gobert (20)	Donovan Mitchell (7)	American Airlines Arena; 19,890	18–12
31	December 26	Portland	W 121–115	Donovan Mitchell (35)	Rudy Gobert (15)	Donovan Mitchell (7)	Vivint Smart Home Arena; 18,306	19–12
32	December 28	@ L. A. Clippers	W 120–107	Donovan Mitchell (30)	Royce O'Neale (10)	Donovan Mitchell (9)	Staples Center; 19,068	20–12
33	December 30	Detroit	W 104–81	Donovan Mitchell (23)	Rudy Gobert (19)	Joe Ingles (5)	Vivint Smart Home Arena; 18,306	21–12

January: 11–4 (home: 5–1; road: 6–3)

Game	Date	Team	Score	High points	High rebounds	High assists	Location Attendance	Record
34	January 2	@ Chicago	W 102–98	Bojan Bogdanović (19)	Rudy Gobert (12)	Joe Ingles (10)	United Center; 19,398	22–12
35	January 4	@ Orlando	W 109–96	Donovan Mitchell (32)	Rudy Gobert (17)	Donovan Mitchell (6)	Amway Center; 16,913	23–12
36	January 6	@ New Orleans	W 128–126	Bojan Bogdanović (35)	Rudy Gobert (19)	Mitchell, Ingles (6)	Smoothie King Center; 14,138	24–12
37	January 8	New York	W 128–104	Bogdanović, Mudiay (20)	Rudy Gobert (16)	Donovan Mitchell (6)	Vivint Smart Home Arena; 18,306	25–12
38	January 10	Charlotte	W 109–92	Jordan Clarkson (20)	Rudy Gobert (13)	Emmanuel Mudiay (6)	Vivint Smart Home Arena; 18,306	26–12
39	January 12	@ Washington	W 127–116	Bojan Bogdanović (31)	Rudy Gobert (14)	Joe Ingles (9)	Capital One Arena; 15,953	27–12
40	January 14	@ Brooklyn	W 118–107	Joe Ingles (27)	Rudy Gobert (18)	Gobert, Mitchell, Ingles, O'Neale (4)	Barclays Center; 15,381	28–12
41	January 16	@ New Orleans	L 132–138 (OT)	Donovan Mitchell (46)	Rudy Gobert (14)	Joe Ingles (6)	Smoothie King Center; 16,717	28–13
42	January 18	Sacramento	W 123–101	Bojan Bogdanović (30)	Rudy Gobert (15)	Joe Ingles (12)	Vivint Smart Home Arena; 18,306	29–13
43	January 20	Indiana	W 118–88	Donovan Mitchell (25)	Rudy Gobert (14)	Joe Ingles (7)	Vivint Smart Home Arena; 18,306	30–13
44	January 22	@ Golden State	W 129–96	Donovan Mitchell (23)	Rudy Gobert (15)	Joe Ingles (8)	Chase Center; 18,064	31–13
45	January 25	Dallas	W 112–107	Donovan Mitchell (25)	Rudy Gobert (17)	Mitchell, Ingles, Conley Jr. (5)	Vivint Smart Home Arena; 18,306	32–13
46	January 27	Houston	L 117–126	Donovan Mitchell (36)	Rudy Gobert (14)	Joe Ingles (6)	Vivint Smart Home Arena; 18,306	32–14
47	January 29	@ San Antonio	L 120–127	Donovan Mitchell (31)	Rudy Gobert (19)	Mitchell, Ingles, O'Neale, Bogdanović (4)	AT&T Center; 17,887	32–15
48	January 30	@ Denver	L 100–106	Jordan Clarkson (37)	Rudy Gobert (11)	Ingles, Mitchell (8)	Pepsi Center; 19,520	32–16

February: 5–6 (home: 3–5; road: 2–1)

Game	Date	Team	Score	High points	High rebounds	High assists	Location Attendance	Record
49	February 1	@ Portland	L 107–124	Donovan Mitchell (25)	Rudy Gobert (11)	Joe Ingles (5)	Moda Center; 19,603	32–17
50	February 5	Denver	L 95–98	Mike Conley Jr. (21)	Rudy Gobert (14)	Joe Ingles (6)	Vivint Smart Home Arena; 18,306	32–18
51	February 7	Portland	W 117–114	Bojan Bogdanović (27)	Rudy Gobert (14)	Donovan Mitchell (7)	Vivint Smart Home Arena; 18,306	33–18
52	February 9	@ Houston	W 114–113	Jordan Clarkson (30)	Rudy Gobert (15)	Joe Ingles (7)	Toyota Center; 18,055	34–18
53	February 10	@ Dallas	W 123–119	Jordan Clarkson (25)	Rudy Gobert (16)	Clarkson, Ingles (8)	American Airlines Center; 19,793	35–18
54	February 12	Miami	W 116–101	Donovan Mitchell (26)	Rudy Gobert (20)	Joe Ingles (9)	Vivint Smart Home Arena; 18,306	36–18
55	February 21	San Antonio	L 104–113	Gobert, Mudiay (18)	Rudy Gobert (14)	Joe Ingles (7)	Vivint Smart Home Arena; 18,306	36–19
56	February 22	Houston	L 110–120	Donovan Mitchell (31)	Clarkson, Conley Jr., Mitchell (7)	Mike Conley Jr. (7)	Vivint Smart Home Arena; 18,306	36–20
57	February 24	Phoenix	L 111–131	Donovan Mitchell (38)	Royce O'Neale (9)	Ingles, Mitchell (4)	Vivint Smart Home Arena; 18,306	36–21
58	February 26	Boston	L 103–114	Donovan Mitchell (37)	Rudy Gobert (9)	Donovan Mitchell (5)	Vivint Smart Home Arena; 18,306	36–22
59	February 28	Washington	W 129–119	Donovan Mitchell (30)	Rudy Gobert (9)	Conley Jr., Ingles (6)	Vivint Smart Home Arena; 18,306	37–22

March: 4–1 (home: 0–1; road: 4–0)

Game	Date	Team	Score	High points	High rebounds	High assists	Location Attendance	Record
60	March 2	@ Cleveland	W 126–113	Bojan Bogdanović (28)	Gobert, Mitchell (9)	Joe Ingles (8)	Rocket Mortgage FieldHouse; 15,453	38–22
61	March 4	@ New York	W 112–104	Bogdanović, Mitchell (23)	Rudy Gobert (14)	Donovan Mitchell (8)	Madison Square Garden; 16,588	39–22
62	March 6	@ Boston	W 99–94	Mike Conley Jr. (25)	3 tied (7)	Joe Ingles (6)	TD Garden; 19,156	40–22
63	March 7	@ Detroit	W 111–105	Bojan Bogdanović (32)	Rudy Gobert (12)	Conley Jr., O'Neale (4)	Little Caesars Arena; 16,590	41–22
64	March 9	Toronto	L 92–101	Joe Ingles (20)	Royce O'Neale (7)	Mike Conley Jr. (7)	Vivint Smart Home Arena; 18,306	41–23

Seeding games: 3–5 (home: 2–2; road: 1–3)

Game	Date	Team	Score	High points	High rebounds	High assists	Location Attendance	Record
65	July 30	@ New Orleans	W 106–104	Jordan Clarkson (23)	Rudy Gobert (12)	Donovan Mitchell (5)	HP Field House; No In-Person Attendance	42–23
66	August 1	@ Oklahoma City	L 94–110	Donovan Mitchell (13)	Rudy Gobert (7)	Conley Jr., Ingles, Mitchell (4)	The Arena; No In-Person Attendance	42–24
67	August 3	L. A. Lakers	L 108–116	Donovan Mitchell (33)	Gobert, O'Neale (13)	Mike Conley (8)	The Arena; No In-Person Attendance	42–25
68	August 5	Memphis	W 124–115	Joe Ingles (25)	Rudy Gobert (16)	Mike Conley Jr. (7)	HP Field House; No In-Person Attendance	43–25
69	August 7	@ San Antonio	L 111–119	Jordan Clarkson (24)	Tony Bradley (11)	Emmanuel Mudiay (5)	HP Field House; No In-Person Attendance	43–26
70	August 8	@ Denver	L 132–134 (2OT)	Donovan Mitchell (35)	Rudy Gobert (13)	Joe Ingles (13)	The Arena; No In-Person Attendance	43–27
71	August 10	Dallas	L 114–122	Jordan Clarkson (18)	Bradley, Gobert (5)	Joe Ingles (7)	The Arena; No In-Person Attendance	43–28
72	August 13	San Antonio	W 118–112	Rayjon Tucker (18)	Tony Bradley (10)	Jarrell Brantley (6)	HP Field House; No In-Person Attendance	44–28

Cancelled games

Game	Date	Team	Score	High points	High rebounds	High assists	Location Attendance	Record
65	March 11	@ Oklahoma City					Chesapeake Energy Arena	
66	March 13	New Orleans					Vivint Smart Home Arena	
67	March 14	Memphis					Vivint Smart Home Arena	
68	March 16	LA Lakers					Vivint Smart Home Arena	
69	March 18	@ LA Lakers					Staples Center	
70	March 20	Minnesota					Vivint Smart Home Arena	
71	March 22	@ San Antonio					AT&T Center	
72	March 24	San Antonio					Vivint Smart Home Arena	
73	March 26	@ Dallas					American Airlines Center	
74	March 28	Atlanta					Vivint Smart Home Arena	
75	March 30	Chicago					Vivint Smart Home Arena	
76	April 1	Cleveland					Vivint Smart Home Arena	
77	April 2	@ Portland					Moda Center	
78	April 5	@ Denver					Pepsi Center	
79	April 7	LA Clippers					Vivint Smart Home Arena	
80	April 11	@ Phoenix					Talking Stick Resort Arena	
81	April 13	@ Oklahoma City					Chesapeake Energy Arena	
82	April 14	Denver					Vivint Smart Home Arena	

2019–20 season schedule

=== Playoffs ===
2020 playoff game log
Total: 3–4 (home: 2–1; road: 1–3)
First round: 3–4 (home: 2–1; road: 1–3)

Game	Date	Team	Score	High points	High rebounds	High assists	Location Attendance	Series
1	August 17	@ Denver	L 125–135 (OT)	Donovan Mitchell (57)	Bradley, Mitchell (9)	Donovan Mitchell (7)	HP Field House; No in-person attendance	0–1
2	August 19	@ Denver	W 124–105	Donovan Mitchell (30)	Bradley, Gobert, O'Neale (7)	Mitchell, O'Neale (8)	The Arena; No in-person attendance	1–1
3	August 21	Denver	W 124–87	Mike Conley Jr. (27)	Rudy Gobert (14)	Joe Ingles (8)	The Arena; No in-person attendance	2–1
4	August 23	Denver	W 129–127	Donovan Mitchell (51)	Rudy Gobert (11)	Donovan Mitchell (7)	The Arena; No in-person attendance	3–1
5	August 25	@ Denver	L 107–117	Donovan Mitchell (30)	Rudy Gobert (12)	Conley Jr., Mitchell (5)	HP Field House; No in-person attendance	3–2
6	August 30	Denver	L 107–119	Donovan Mitchell (44)	Rudy Gobert (11)	Mike Conley Jr. (6)	The Arena; No in-person attendance	3–3
7	September 1	@ Denver	L 78–80	Donovan Mitchell (22)	Rudy Gobert (18)	Mike Conley Jr. (7)	The Arena; No in-person attendance	4–3

2020 playoff schedule

== Player statistics ==
Legend
GP	Games played	GS	Games started	MPG	Minutes per game
FG%	Field-goal percentage	3P%	3-point field-goal percentage	FT%	Free-throw percentage
RPG	Rebounds per game	APG	Assists per game	SPG	Steals per game
BPG	Blocks per game	PPG	Points per game

=== Regular season ===
Player	GP	GS	MPG	FG%	3P%	FT%	RPG	APG	SPG	BPG	PPG
Joe Ingles	72	45	29.7	.445	.399	.787	3.9	5.2	.9	.2	9.8
Royce O'Neale	71	62	28.9	.433	.377	.764	5.5	2.5	.8	.5	6.3
Donovan Mitchell	69	69	34.3	.449	.366	.863	4.4	4.3	1.0	.2	24.0
Rudy Gobert	68	68	34.3	.693		.630	13.5	1.5	.8	2.0	15.1
Georges Niang	66	1	14.0	.438	.400	.833	1.9	.7	.3	.1	5.9
Bojan Bogdanović	63	63	33.1	.447	.414	.903	4.1	2.1	.5	.1	20.2
Tony Bradley	58	3	11.4	.667	1.000	.652	4.6	.4	.2	.6	4.9
Emmanuel Mudiay	54	2	15.7	.462	.345	.759	2.3	2.1	.4	.2	7.3
Mike Conley Jr.	47	41	29.0	.409	.375	.827	3.2	4.4	.8	.1	14.4
Jordan Clarkson^{†}	42	2	24.7	.462	.366	.785	2.8	1.6	.7	.2	15.6
Jeff Green^{†}	30	2	18.4	.385	.327	.778	2.7	.7	.4	.3	7.8
Ed Davis	28	1	10.8	.478		.500	3.8	.4	.4	.3	1.8
Juwan Morgan	21	0	6.4	.577	.375	.750	1.4	.3	.0	.1	1.7
Rayjon Tucker	20	0	8.1	.465	.176	.826	1.0	.3	.1	.1	3.1
Danté Exum^{†}	11	0	7.5	.435	.333	1.000	1.1	.6	.1	.2	2.2
Miye Oni	10	1	10.9	.375	.368	.800	1.7	.4	.4	.2	3.5
Nigel Williams-Goss	10	0	5.0	.313	.286	1.000	.6	.6	.3	.1	1.4
Jarrell Brantley	9	0	10.7	.357	.231	.500	2.2	1.2	.3	.6	2.7
Justin Wright-Foreman	4	0	11.3	.350	.200	.750	1.3	1.8	.5	.0	4.8
Stanton Kidd	4	0	3.8	.000	.000		.8	.3	.0	.0	.0

=== Playoffs ===
Player	GP	GS	MPG	FG%	3P%	FT%	RPG	APG	SPG	BPG	PPG
Rudy Gobert	7	7	38.6	.649		.524	11.4	1.1	.6	1.4	16.9
Donovan Mitchell	7	7	37.7	.529	.516	.948	5.0	4.9	1.0	.3	36.3
Royce O'Neale	7	7	35.6	.406	.455	.500	5.4	2.7	1.3	.3	5.6
Joe Ingles	7	7	33.4	.407	.350	1.000	3.4	4.7	.6	.1	9.1
Juwan Morgan	7	2	12.3	.250	.200	.333	3.0	.7	.3	.0	1.4
Jordan Clarkson	7	0	28.6	.464	.347	1.000	3.4	2.1	.9	.0	16.7
Georges Niang	7	0	16.3	.500	.414	1.000	2.1	.6	.0	.1	8.3
Tony Bradley	6	0	8.0	.222		.714	3.8	.2	.3	.3	1.5
Mike Conley Jr.	5	5	33.0	.484	.529	.864	2.8	5.2	1.6	.2	19.8
Emmanuel Mudiay	3	0	11.3	.357	.667	.500	2.0	.7	.0	.3	4.3
Miye Oni	2	0	7.0	.500	.250		2.0	.0	.5	.5	3.5
Jarrell Brantley	2	0	6.5	.000	.000	.500	2.0	1.0	.0	.5	.5
Rayjon Tucker	2	0	5.5	.400	.333		.0	.0	.0	.0	2.5
Nigel Williams-Goss	1	0	2.0				.0	1.0	.0	.0	.0

- ^{†} Denotes player spent time with another team in the season. Stats reflect time with the Jazz only.

== Transactions ==
=== Trades ===
July 6
December 23
To Utah Jazz

- Mike Conley Jr.
To Utah Jazz

- Jordan Clarkson
To Memphis Grizzlies

- Grayson Allen
- Jae Crowder
- Kyle Korver
- Draft rights to Darius Bazley (#23)
- 2020 UTA protected first-round pick
To Cleveland Cavaliers

- Dante Exum
- 2022 second-round pick (owned by San Antonio)
- 2023 second-round pick (owned by Golden State)

=== Free agency ===
==== Additions ====
Player	Signed	Former team
Bojan Bogdanović	July 7	Indiana Pacers
William Howard	July 17	Limoges CSP (France)
Stanton Kidd	July 17	Darüşşafaka Basketbol (Turkey)
Ed Davis	July 20	Brooklyn Nets
Jeff Green	July 20	Washington Wizards
Emmanuel Mudiay	July 20	New York Knicks
Rayjon Tucker	December 24	Wisconsin Herd

==== Subtractions ====
Player	Reason left	New team
Ricky Rubio	Free agent	Phoenix Suns
Raul Neto	Waived	Philadelphia 76ers
Derrick Favors	Trade	New Orleans Pelicans
Jeff Green	Waived	Free agent
