= 2019–20 Boston Celtics season =

NBA basketball team season

- Head coach: Brad Stevens
- General manager: Danny Ainge
- Owners: Wyc Grousbeck
- Arena: TD Garden

Results
- Record: 48–24 (.667)
- Place: Division: 2nd (Atlantic); Conference: 3rd (Eastern)
- Playoff finish: Conference finals (lost to Heat 2–4)
- Stats at Basketball Reference

Local media
- Television: NBC Sports Boston
- Radio: WBZ-FM

The 2019–20 Boston Celtics season was the 74th season of the franchise in the National Basketball Association (NBA). This was the team's seventh season under head coach Brad Stevens.

After losing Kyrie Irving and Al Horford to free agency, the Celtics signed former Charlotte Hornets All-Star Kemba Walker and former New York Knicks and Portland Trail Blazers center Enes Kanter in the offseason. The season was suspended by league officials following the games of March 11 due to the COVID-19 pandemic. On March 19, Marcus Smart announced that he tested positive for COVID-19.

On June 4, the Celtics were one of 22 teams invited to the NBA Bubble. In the first round of the NBA playoffs, the Celtics defeated the No. 6 seeded Philadelphia 76ers in four games. The team defeated the No. 2 seeded and NBA champion Toronto Raptors in seven games in the Eastern Conference semifinals. However, the Celtics lost to the fifth-seeded Miami Heat in the Eastern Conference finals in six games.

== Draft picks ==
Round	Pick	Player	Position	Nationality	College
1	14	Romeo Langford	SG	United States	Indiana
1	22	Grant Williams	PF	United States	Tennessee
2	33	Carsen Edwards	PG	United States	Purdue
2	51	Tremont Waters	PG	United States	LSU

The Boston Celtics hold 3 first-round picks and a second-round pick for the 2019 NBA Draft. The 14th pick was transferred from the Sacramento Kings as it failed to reach the 1st pick.

== Roster ==
2019–20 Boston Celtics roster
Players

Pos.	No.	Player	Height	Weight	DOB	From
SG	7	Jaylen Brown	6 ft 6 in (1.98 m)	223 lb (101 kg)	1996–10–24	California
PG	4	Carsen Edwards	5 ft 11 in (1.80 m)	200 lb (91 kg)	1998–03–12	Purdue
C	99	Tacko Fall (TW)	7 ft 5 in (2.26 m)	311 lb (141 kg)	1995–12–10	Central Florida
G	43	Javonte Green	6 ft 4 in (1.93 m)	205 lb (93 kg)	1993–07–23	Radford
SF	20	Gordon Hayward	6 ft 7 in (2.01 m)	225 lb (102 kg)	1990–03–23	Butler
PF	11	Enes Kanter	6 ft 11 in (2.11 m)	250 lb (113 kg)	1992–05–20	Turkey
SG	45	Romeo Langford	6 ft 4 in (1.93 m)	216 lb (98 kg)	1999–10–25	Indiana
PF	37	Semi Ojeleye	6 ft 7 in (2.01 m)	240 lb (109 kg)	1994–12–05	SMU
C	77	Vincent Poirier	7 ft 0 in (2.13 m)	235 lb (107 kg)	1993–10–27	France
PG	36	Marcus Smart (C)	6 ft 3 in (1.91 m)	220 lb (100 kg)	1994–03–06	Oklahoma State
PF	0	Jayson Tatum	6 ft 8 in (2.03 m)	210 lb (95 kg)	1998–03–03	Duke
C	27	Daniel Theis	6 ft 8 in (2.03 m)	245 lb (111 kg)	1992–04–04	Germany
PG	8	Kemba Walker	6 ft 0 in (1.83 m)	184 lb (83 kg)	1990–05–08	Connecticut
SG	9	Brad Wanamaker	6 ft 3 in (1.91 m)	210 lb (95 kg)	1989–07–25	Pittsburgh
PG	51	Tremont Waters (TW)	5 ft 10 in (1.78 m)	175 lb (79 kg)	1998–01–10	LSU
PF	12	Grant Williams	6 ft 6 in (1.98 m)	236 lb (107 kg)	1998–11–30	Tennessee
C	44	Robert Williams III	6 ft 9 in (2.06 m)	237 lb (108 kg)	1997–10–17	Texas A&M

Coaches
Head coach
- Brad Stevens
Assistant(s)
- Brandon Bailey
- Jay Larrañaga
- Joe Mazzulla
- Scott Morrison
- Jamie Young

Legend
- (DP) Unsigned draft pick
- (FA) Free agent
- (S) Suspended
- (GL) On assignment to G League affiliate
- (TW) Two-way affiliate player
- Injured

Roster
Updated: 2020–01–18

== Standings ==
=== Division ===
Atlantic Division	W	L	PCT	GB	Home	Road	Div	GP
y – Toronto Raptors	53	19	.736	–	26‍–‍10	27‍–‍9	9–5	72
x – Boston Celtics	48	24	.667	5.0	26‍–‍10	22‍–‍14	9–6	72
x – Philadelphia 76ers	43	30	.589	10.5	31‍–‍4	12‍–‍26	11–5	73
x – Brooklyn Nets	35	37	.486	18.0	20‍–‍16	15‍–‍21	6–10	72
New York Knicks	21	45	.318	29.0	11‍–‍22	10‍–‍23	2–11	66

=== Conference ===
Eastern Conference
#	Team	W	L	PCT	GB	GP
1	z – Milwaukee Bucks *	56	17	.767	–	73
2	y – Toronto Raptors *	53	19	.736	2.5	72
3	x – Boston Celtics	48	24	.667	7.5	72
4	x – Indiana Pacers	45	28	.616	11.0	73
5	y – Miami Heat *	44	29	.603	12.0	73
6	x – Philadelphia 76ers	43	30	.589	13.0	73
7	x – Brooklyn Nets	35	37	.486	20.5	72
8	x – Orlando Magic	33	40	.452	23.0	73
9	Washington Wizards	25	47	.347	30.5	72
10	Charlotte Hornets	23	42	.354	29.0	65
11	Chicago Bulls	22	43	.338	30.0	65
12	New York Knicks	21	45	.318	31.5	66
13	Detroit Pistons	20	46	.303	32.5	66
14	Atlanta Hawks	20	47	.299	33.0	67
15	Cleveland Cavaliers	19	46	.292	33.0	65

== Game log ==
=== Preseason ===
2019 preseason game log
Total: 4–0 (home: 2–0; road: 2–0)
Preseason: 4–0 (home: 2–0; road: 2–0)

Game	Date	Team	Score	High points	High rebounds	High assists	Location Attendance	Record
1	October 6	Charlotte	W 107–106	Jayson Tatum (20)	Grant Williams (9)	Kemba Walker (4)	TD Garden; 18,624	1–0
2	October 11	@ Orlando	W 100–75	Jayson Tatum (15)	Daniel Theis (9)	Wanamaker, Smart (4)	Amway Center; 17,354	2–0
3	October 13	Cleveland	W 118–72	Max Strus (14)	Jayson Tatum (9)	Tremont Waters (4)	TD Garden; 18,624	3–0
4	October 15	@ Cleveland	W 118–95	Carsen Edwards (30)	Javonte Green (9)	Tremont Waters (7)	Rocket Mortgage FieldHouse; 12,398	4–0

2019–20 season schedule

=== Regular season ===
2019–20 game log
Total: 48–24 (home: 26–10; road: 22–14)
October: 3–1 (home: 2–0; road: 1–1)

Game	Date	Team	Score	High points	High rebounds	High assists	Location Attendance	Record
1	October 23	@ Philadelphia	L 93–107	Gordon Hayward (25)	Jayson Tatum (10)	Marcus Smart (6)	Wells Fargo Center; 20,422	0–1
2	October 25	Toronto	W 112–106	Tatum, Brown (25)	Tatum, Brown (9)	Tatum, Brown, G.Williams (4)	TD Garden; 18,624	1–1
3	October 26	@ New York	W 118–95	Kemba Walker (32)	Jayson Tatum (9)	Smart, Walker (4)	Madison Square Garden; 19,812	2–1
4	October 30	Milwaukee	W 116–105	Kemba Walker (32)	Gordon Hayward (10)	Gordon Hayward (7)	TD Garden; 18,624	3–1

November: 10–4 (home: 5–0; road: 5–4)

Game	Date	Team	Score	High points	High rebounds	High assists	Location Attendance	Record
5	November 1	New York	W 104–102	Kemba Walker (33)	Gordon Hayward (9)	Kemba Walker (5)	TD Garden; 18,624	4–1
6	November 5	@ Cleveland	W 119–113	Gordon Hayward (39)	Daniel Theis (9)	Gordon Hayward (8)	Rocket Mortgage FieldHouse; 17,709	5–1
7	November 7	@ Charlotte	W 108–87	Jayson Tatum (23)	Gordon Hayward (10)	Hayward, Walker (6)	Spectrum Center; 18,487	6–1
8	November 9	@ San Antonio	W 135–115	Jaylen Brown (30)	Tatum, Brown, Williams III (7)	Kemba Walker (8)	AT&T Center; 18,354	7–1
9	November 11	Dallas	W 116–106	Kemba Walker (29)	Jaylen Brown (11)	Marcus Smart (6)	TD Garden; 18,624	8–1
10	November 13	Washington	W 140–133	Kemba Walker (25)	Enes Kanter (9)	Smart, Walker, Wanamaker (5)	TD Garden; 19,156	9–1
11	November 15	@ Golden State	W 105–100	Jayson Tatum (24)	Brown, Tatum (8)	Kemba Walker (5)	Chase Center; 18,064	10–1
12	November 17	@ Sacramento	L 99–100	Jaylen Brown (18)	Daniel Theis (10)	Smart, Walker (9)	Golden 1 Center; 16,633	10–2
13	November 18	@ Phoenix	W 99–85	Jayson Tatum (26)	Theis, Tatum (11)	Brad Wanamaker (6)	Talking Stick Resort Arena; 15,193	11–2
14	November 20	@ L. A. Clippers	L 104–107 (OT)	Jayson Tatum (30)	Daniel Theis (14)	Marcus Smart (8)	Staples Center; 19,068	11–3
15	November 22	@ Denver	L 92–96	Jaylen Brown (22)	Jaylen Brown (10)	Brown, Wanamaker (4)	Pepsi Center; 19,520	11–4
16	November 25	Sacramento	W 103–102	Jaylen Brown (24)	Enes Kanter (9)	Marcus Smart (7)	TD Garden; 19,156	12–4
17	November 27	Brooklyn	W 121–110	Kemba Walker (39)	Jaylen Brown (10)	Smart, Tatum (5)	TD Garden; 19,156	13–4
18	November 29	@ Brooklyn	L 107–112	Jayson Tatum (26)	Jayson Tatum (9)	Kemba Walker (6)	Barclays Center; 17,732	13–5

December: 10–3 (home: 6–2; road: 4–1)

Game	Date	Team	Score	High points	High rebounds	High assists	Location Attendance	Record
19	December 1	@ New York	W 113–104	Jayson Tatum (30)	Enes Kanter (11)	Kemba Walker (10)	Madison Square Garden; 18,005	14–5
20	December 4	Miami	W 112–93	Jaylen Brown (31)	Robert Williams III (10)	Kemba Walker (7)	TD Garden; 19,156	15–5
21	December 6	Denver	W 108–95	Jayson Tatum (26)	Brown, Tatum (7)	Jayson Tatum (5)	TD Garden; 19,156	16–5
22	December 9	Cleveland	W 110–88	Kemba Walker (22)	Jayson Tatum (11)	Kemba Walker (7)	TD Garden; 19,156	17–5
23	December 11	@ Indiana	L 117–122	Kemba Walker (44)	Jaylen Brown (8)	Jaylen Brown (8)	Bankers Life Fieldhouse; 15,637	17–6
24	December 12	Philadelphia	L 109–115	Kemba Walker (29)	Enes Kanter (9)	Kemba Walker (8)	TD Garden; 19,156	17–7
25	December 18	@ Dallas	W 109–103	Kemba Walker (32)	Enes Kanter (13)	Kemba Walker (3)	American Airlines Center; 20,181	18–7
26	December 20	Detroit	W 114–93	Brown, Tatum (26)	Enes Kanter (18)	Kemba Walker (11)	TD Garden; 19,156	19–7
27	December 22	Charlotte	W 119–93	Jayson Tatum (39)	Enes Kanter (13)	Brad Wanamaker (8)	TD Garden; 19,156	20–7
28	December 25	@ Toronto	W 118–102	Jaylen Brown (30)	Enes Kanter (11)	Hayward, Tatum (6)	Scotiabank Arena; 19,800	21–7
29	December 27	Cleveland	W 129–117	Jaylen Brown (34)	Brown, Kanter (9)	Gordon Hayward (8)	TD Garden; 19,156	22–7
30	December 28	Toronto	L 97–113	Kemba Walker (30)	Hayward, Kanter (6)	Jayson Tatum (4)	TD Garden; 19,156	22–8
31	December 31	@ Charlotte	W 109–92	Jayson Tatum (24)	Enes Kanter (14)	Smart, Walker (7)	Spectrum Center; 19,216	23–8

January: 9–7 (home: 6–3; road: 3–4)

Game	Date	Team	Score	High points	High rebounds	High assists	Location Attendance	Record
32	January 3	Atlanta	W 109–106	Jaylen Brown (24)	Enes Kanter (11)	Marcus Smart (9)	TD Garden; 19,156	24–8
33	January 4	@ Chicago	W 111–104	Jayson Tatum (28)	Enes Kanter (12)	Smart, Wanamaker (5)	United Center; 21,130	25–8
34	January 6	@ Washington	L 94–99	Jaylen Brown (23)	Jaylen Brown (12)	Gordon Hayward (4)	Capital One Arena; 17,963	25–9
35	January 8	San Antonio	L 114–129	Gordon Hayward (18)	Enes Kanter (7)	Marcus Smart (5)	TD Garden; 19,156	25–10
36	January 9	@ Philadelphia	L 98–109	Kemba Walker (26)	Enes Kanter (11)	Jayson Tatum (4)	Wells Fargo Center; 20,822	25–11
37	January 11	New Orleans	W 140–105	Jayson Tatum (41)	Enes Kanter (19)	Kemba Walker (7)	TD Garden; 19,156	26–11
38	January 13	Chicago	W 113–101	Jayson Tatum (21)	Enes Kanter (9)	Hayward, Smart (8)	TD Garden; 19,156	27–11
39	January 15	Detroit	L 103–116	Gordon Hayward (25)	Jaylen Brown (12)	Daniel Theis (6)	TD Garden; 19,156	27–12
40	January 16	@ Milwaukee	L 123–128	Kemba Walker (40)	Kemba Walker (11)	Brad Wanamaker (4)	Fiserv Forum; 17,873	27–13
41	January 18	Phoenix	L 119–123	Marcus Smart (37)	Jayson Tatum (10)	Marcus Smart (8)	TD Garden; 19,156	27–14
42	January 20	L. A. Lakers	W 139–107	Jayson Tatum (27)	Enes Kanter (11)	Kemba Walker (7)	TD Garden; 19,156	28–14
43	January 22	Memphis	W 119–95	Jayson Tatum (23)	Enes Kanter (8)	Marcus Smart (6)	TD Garden; 19,156	29–14
44	January 24	@ Orlando	W 109–98	Kemba Walker (37)	Gordon Hayward (14)	Smart, Walker (6)	Amway Center; 18,846	30–14
45	January 26	@ New Orleans	L 108–123	Kemba Walker (35)	Daniel Theis (9)	Marcus Smart (7)	Smoothie King Center; 16,737	30–15
46	January 28	@ Miami	W 109–101	Gordon Hayward (29)	Daniel Theis (11)	Kemba Walker (8)	American Airlines Arena; 19,704	31–15
47	January 30	Golden State	W 119–104	Gordon Hayward (25)	Hayward, Theis (8)	Marcus Smart (6)	TD Garden; 19,156	32–15

February: 9–3 (home: 4–1; road: 5–2)

Game	Date	Team	Score	High points	High rebounds	High assists	Location Attendance	Record
48	February 1	Philadelphia	W 116–95	Jaylen Brown (32)	Brown, Hayward (9)	Smart, Tatum (4)	TD Garden; 19,156	33–15
49	February 3	@ Atlanta	W 123–115	Jayson Tatum (28)	Enes Kanter (9)	Gordon Hayward (6)	State Farm Arena; 16,231	34–15
50	February 5	Orlando	W 116–100	Jayson Tatum (33)	Kanter, Tatum (8)	Gordon Hayward (7)	TD Garden; 19,156	35–15
51	February 7	Atlanta	W 112–107	Jayson Tatum (32)	Enes Kanter (15)	Smart, Tatum, Walker (6)	TD Garden; 19,156	36–15
52	February 9	@ Oklahoma City	W 112–111	Kemba Walker (27)	Tatum, Theis (11)	Daniel Theis (5)	Chesapeake Energy Arena; 18,203	37–15
53	February 11	@ Houston	L 105–116	Gordon Hayward (20)	Tatum, Theis (9)	Gordon Hayward (6)	Toyota Center; 18,055	37–16
54	February 13	L. A. Clippers	W 141–133 (2OT)	Jayson Tatum (39)	Gordon Hayward (13)	Kemba Walker (7)	TD Garden; 19,156	38–16
All-Star Break
55	February 21	@ Minnesota	W 127–117	Gordon Hayward (29)	Daniel Theis (16)	Marcus Smart (10)	Target Center; 18,978	39–16
56	February 23	@ L. A. Lakers	L 112–114	Jayson Tatum (41)	Daniel Theis (9)	Gordon Hayward (9)	Staples Center; 18,997	39–17
57	February 25	@ Portland	W 118–106	Jayson Tatum (36)	Daniel Theis (9)	Brad Wanamaker (4)	Moda Center; 19,460	40–17
58	February 26	@ Utah	W 114–103	Jayson Tatum (33)	Jayson Tatum (11)	Marcus Smart (9)	Vivint Smart Home Arena; 18,306	41–17
59	February 29	Houston	L 110–111 (OT)	Jayson Tatum (32)	Daniel Theis (15)	Marcus Smart (7)	TD Garden; 19,156	41–18

March: 2–3 (home: 0–3; road: 2–0)

Game	Date	Team	Score	High points	High rebounds	High assists	Location Attendance	Record
60	March 3	Brooklyn	L 120–129 (OT)	Jaylen Brown (22)	Javonte Green (8)	Marcus Smart (10)	TD Garden; 19,156	41–19
61	March 4	@ Cleveland	W 112–106	Jayson Tatum (32)	Enes Kanter (11)	Jayson Tatum (6)	Rocket Mortgage FieldHouse; 16,897	42–19
62	March 6	Utah	L 94–99	Marcus Smart (29)	Daniel Theis (9)	Kemba Walker (7)	TD Garden; 19,156	42–20
63	March 8	Oklahoma City	L 104–105	Gordon Hayward (24)	Marcus Smart (10)	Kemba Walker (5)	TD Garden; 19,156	42–21
64	March 10	@ Indiana	W 114–111	Jayson Tatum (30)	Gordon Hayward (10)	Hayward, Smart (5)	Bankers Life Fieldhouse; 17,053	43–21

Seeding games: 5–3 (home: 3–1; road: 2–2)

Game	Date	Team	Score	High points	High rebounds	High assists	Location Attendance	Record
65	July 31	@ Milwaukee	L 112–119	Marcus Smart (23)	Daniel Theis (12)	Gordon Hayward (6)	HP Field House; No In-Person Attendance	43–22
66	August 2	Portland	W 128–124	Jayson Tatum (34)	Hayward, Kanter (8)	Jayson Tatum (8)	The Arena; No In-Person Attendance	44–22
67	August 4	@ Miami	L 106–112	Jayson Tatum (23)	Jaylen Brown (10)	Kemba Walker (4)	HP Field House; No In-Person Attendance	44–23
68	August 5	Brooklyn	W 149–115	Jaylen Brown (21)	Gordon Hayward (7)	Marcus Smart (6)	The Arena; No In-Person Attendance	45–23
69	August 7	@ Toronto	W 122–100	Jaylen Brown (20)	Daniel Theis (11)	Marcus Smart (5)	The Arena; No In-Person Attendance	46–23
70	August 9	Orlando	W 122–119 (OT)	Gordon Hayward (31)	Jaylen Brown (12)	Marcus Smart (9)	The Arena; No In-Person Attendance	47–23
71	August 11	@ Memphis	W 122–107	Jayson Tatum (29)	Enes Kanter (8)	Marcus Smart (9)	HP Field House; No In-Person Attendance	48–23
72	August 13	Washington	L 90–96	Javonte Green (23)	Vincent Poirier (9)	Langford, Wanamaker, Waters (4)	The Arena; No In-Person Attendance	48–24

Cancelled games

Game	Date	Team	Score	High points	High rebounds	High assists	Location Attendance	Record
65	March 12	@ Milwaukee					Fiserv Forum	
66	March 13	Washington					TD Garden	
67	March 15	@ Chicago					United Center	
68	March 18	New York					TD Garden	
69	March 20	@ Toronto					Scotiabank Arena	
70	March 21	@ Brooklyn					Barclays Center	
71	March 23	@ Washington					Capital One Arena	
72	March 25	@ Memphis					FedExForum	
73	March 27	Portland					TD Garden	
74	March 29	Minnesota					TD Garden	
75	April 1	Miami					TD Garden	
76	April 3	Orlando					TD Garden	
77	April 5	Milwaukee					TD Garden	
78	April 8	Indiana					TD Garden	
79	April 10	@ Orlando					Amway Center	
80	April 11	@ Miami					American Airlines Arena	
81	April 13	@ Detroit					Little Caesars Arena	
82	April 15	Chicago					TD Garden	

2019–20 season schedule

=== Playoffs ===
2020 playoff game log
Total: 10–7 (home: 4–5; road: 6–2)
First Round: 4–0 (home: 2–0; road: 2–0)

Game	Date	Team	Score	High points	High rebounds	High assists	Location Attendance	Series
1	August 17	Philadelphia	W 109–101	Jayson Tatum (32)	Jayson Tatum (13)	Kemba Walker (5)	HP Field House; No in-person attendance	1–0
2	August 19	Philadelphia	W 128–101	Jayson Tatum (33)	Enes Kanter (9)	Jayson Tatum (5)	HP Field House; No in-person attendance	2–0
3	August 21	@ Philadelphia	W 102–94	Kemba Walker (24)	Smart, Walker (8)	Kemba Walker (4)	HP Field House; No in-person attendance	3–0
4	August 23	@ Philadelphia	W 110–106	Kemba Walker (32)	Jayson Tatum (15)	Smart, Tatum, Walker (4)	HP Field House; No in-person attendance	4–0

Conference semifinals: 4–3 (home: 0–3; road: 4–0)

Game	Date	Team	Score	High points	High rebounds	High assists	Location Attendance	Series
1	August 30	@ Toronto	W 112–94	Smart, Tatum (21)	Daniel Theis (15)	Kemba Walker (10)	HP Field House; No in-person attendance	1–0
2	September 1	@ Toronto	W 102–99	Jayson Tatum (34)	Daniel Theis (9)	Jayson Tatum (6)	HP Field House; No in-person attendance	2–0
3	September 3	Toronto	L 103–104	Kemba Walker (29)	Jaylen Brown (12)	Jayson Tatum (6)	HP Field House; No in-person attendance	2–1
4	September 5	Toronto	L 93–100	Jayson Tatum (24)	Jayson Tatum (10)	Kemba Walker (8)	HP Field House; No in-person attendance	2–2
5	September 7	@ Toronto	W 111–89	Jaylen Brown (27)	Jayson Tatum (10)	Kemba Walker (7)	HP Field House; No in-person attendance	3–2
6	September 9	Toronto	L 122–125 (2OT)	Jaylen Brown (31)	Jaylen Brown (16)	Marcus Smart (10)	HP Field House; No in-person attendance	3–3
7	September 11	@ Toronto	W 92–87	Jayson Tatum (29)	Jayson Tatum (12)	Jayson Tatum (7)	AdventHealth Arena; No in-person attendance	4–3

Conference finals: 2–4 (home: 1–2; road: 1–2)

Game	Date	Team	Score	High points	High rebounds	High assists	Location Attendance	Series
1	September 15	Miami	L 114–117 (OT)	Jayson Tatum (30)	Jayson Tatum (14)	Walker, Wanamaker (6)	HP Field House; No in-person attendance	0–1
2	September 17	Miami	L 101–106	Kemba Walker (23)	Daniel Theis (8)	Smart, Tatum (4)	AdventHealth Arena; No in-person attendance	0–2
3	September 19	@ Miami	W 117–106	Jaylen Brown (26)	Jayson Tatum (14)	Jayson Tatum (8)	AdventHealth Arena; No in-person attendance	1–2
4	September 23	@ Miami	L 109–112	Jayson Tatum (28)	Brown, Tatum, Theis (9)	Marcus Smart (11)	AdventHealth Arena; No in-person attendance	1–3
5	September 25	Miami	W 121–108	Jayson Tatum (31)	Daniel Theis (13)	Marcus Smart (8)	AdventHealth Arena; No in-person attendance	2–3
6	September 27	@ Miami	L 113–125	Jaylen Brown (26)	Brown, Smart (8)	Jayson Tatum (11)	AdventHealth Arena; No in-person attendance	2–4

2020 playoff schedule

== Player statistics ==
Legend
GP	Games played	GS	Games started	MPG	Minutes per game
FG%	Field-goal percentage	3P%	3-point field-goal percentage	FT%	Free-throw percentage
RPG	Rebounds per game	APG	Assists per game	SPG	Steals per game
BPG	Blocks per game	PPG	Points per game

=== Regular season ===
Boston Celtics statistics
Player	GP	GS	MPG	FG%	3P%	FT%	RPG	APG	SPG	BPG	PPG
Brad Wanamaker	71	1	19.3	.448	.363	.926	2.0	2.5	.9	.2	6.9
Semi Ojeleye	69	6	14.7	.408	.378	.875	2.1	.5	.3	.1	3.4
Grant Williams	69	5	15.1	.412	.250	.722	2.6	1.0	.4	.5	3.4
Jayson Tatum	66	66	34.3	.450	.403	.812	7.0	3.0	1.4	.9	23.4
Daniel Theis	65	64	24.1	.566	.333	.763	6.6	1.7	.6	1.3	9.2
Marcus Smart	60	40	32.0	.375	.347	.836	3.8	4.9	1.7	.5	12.9
Enes Kanter Freedom	58	7	16.9	.572	.143	.707	7.4	1.0	.4	.7	8.1
Jaylen Brown	57	57	33.9	.481	.382	.724	6.4	2.1	1.1	.4	20.3
Kemba Walker	56	56	31.1	.425	.381	.864	3.9	4.8	.9	.5	20.4
Gordon Hayward	52	52	33.5	.500	.383	.855	6.7	4.1	.7	.4	17.5
Javonte Green	48	2	9.8	.500	.273	.667	1.9	.5	.5	.2	3.4
Carsen Edwards	37	0	9.5	.328	.316	.684	1.3	.6	.3	.1	3.3
Romeo Langford	32	2	11.6	.350	.185	.720	1.3	.4	.3	.3	2.5
Robert Williams III	29	1	13.4	.727		.647	4.4	.9	.8	1.2	5.2
Vincent Poirier	22	0	5.9	.472	.500	.857	2.0	.4	.1	.4	1.9
Tremont Waters	11	1	10.8	.286	.167	1.000	1.1	1.5	.9	.2	3.6
Tacko Fall	7	0	4.7	.786		.333	2.1	.1	.1	.6	3.3

=== Playoffs ===
Boston Celtics statistics
Player	GP	GS	MPG	FG%	3P%	FT%	RPG	APG	SPG	BPG	PPG
Jayson Tatum	17	17	40.6	.434	.373	.813	10.0	5.0	1.0	1.2	25.7
Jaylen Brown	17	17	39.5	.476	.358	.841	7.5	2.3	1.5	.5	21.8
Kemba Walker	17	17	36.9	.441	.310	.852	4.1	5.1	.9	.4	19.6
Daniel Theis	17	17	28.4	.521	.154	.788	7.1	1.5	.4	1.2	8.9
Marcus Smart	17	16	38.1	.394	.333	.875	5.2	4.6	1.2	.5	14.5
Brad Wanamaker	17	0	16.1	.483	.444	.875	2.0	1.8	.7	.2	4.9
Grant Williams	17	0	10.0	.577	.588	.700	1.5	.4	.1	.3	2.8
Robert Williams III	13	0	11.5	.742	.000	.333	3.9	.8	.2	.5	3.7
Semi Ojeleye	13	0	9.4	.250	.217	1.000	.9	.1	.2	.0	1.6
Enes Kanter Freedom	11	0	9.3	.524	1.000	.500	3.9	.6	.0	.0	4.5
Romeo Langford	7	0	6.6	.400	.500	.500	.4	.3	.1	.0	1.4
Gordon Hayward	5	1	31.4	.400	.292	.875	4.0	2.8	1.4	.4	10.8
Tacko Fall	2	0	1.5	1.000		.500	.5	.0	.0	.0	1.5
Javonte Green	1	0	6.0	.500	.500		1.0	.0	.0	.0	3.0
Carsen Edwards	1	0	3.0				1.0	.0	.0	.0	.0
Vincent Poirier	1	0	2.0				.0	1.0	1.0	.0	.0
Tremont Waters	1	0	2.0	.000	.000		1.0	1.0	.0	.0	.0

== Transactions ==
=== Trades ===
June 20, 2019	To Boston Celtics Draft rights to Ty Jerome (#24); Draft rights to Carsen Edwards (#33)	To Philadelphia 76ers Draft rights to Matisse Thybulle (#20)
June 20, 2019	To Boston Celtics 2020 First Round Pick (from Milwaukee Bucks)	To Phoenix Suns Aron Baynes; Draft Rights to Ty Jerome (#24)

=== Re-signed ===
Player	Signed
Daniel Theis	2-year contract worth $10 million
Brad Wanamaker	Undisclosed deal

=== Additions ===
Player	Signed	Former Team
Kemba Walker	4-year contract worth $141 million	Charlotte Hornets
Enes Kanter	2-year contract worth $10 million	Portland Trail Blazers
Vincent Poirier	Undisclosed deal	Saski Baskonia
Tacko Fall	Two-way contract	UCF

=== Subtractions ===
Player	Reason	New Team
Al Horford	4-year contract worth $109 million	Philadelphia 76ers
Kyrie Irving	4-year contract worth $142 million	Brooklyn Nets
Terry Rozier	3-year contract worth $58 million	Charlotte Hornets
Guerschon Yabusele		Nanjing Monkey Kings
Marcus Morris Sr.	1-year contract worth $15 million	New York Knicks
