= 2019–20 Oklahoma City Thunder season =

12th season in the 53rd NBA

- Head coach: Billy Donovan
- General manager: Sam Presti
- Owners: Professional Basketball Club LLC
- Arena: Chesapeake Energy Arena

Results
- Record: 44–28 (.611)
- Place: Division: 2nd (Northwest); Conference: 5th (Western)
- Playoff finish: First round (lost to Rockets 3–4)
- Stats at Basketball Reference

Local media
- Television: Fox Sports Oklahoma
- Radio: KWPN; WWLS-FM

The 2019–20 Oklahoma City Thunder season was the 12th season of the franchise in Oklahoma City and the 53rd in the National Basketball Association (NBA). This was the Thunder's first season since 2007–08 without Russell Westbrook, as he was traded to the Houston Rockets for Chris Paul and future draft picks on July 11, 2019. The trade reunited Westbrook with former Thunder teammate James Harden, who had played for the team from 2009 to 2012. The trade also marked Chris Paul's first time since 2006–07 playing in Oklahoma City after playing his first two seasons there when he was a member of the New Orleans Hornets (the Hornets temporarily relocated to Oklahoma City for two seasons following the destruction caused by Hurricane Katrina in New Orleans). This trade was preceded by a trade where Paul George was sent to the Los Angeles Clippers for Danilo Gallinari, Shai Gilgeous-Alexander, and a record 5 future 1st-round draft picks on July 7.

The season was suspended by the league officials following the games of March 11 after it was reported that Rudy Gobert tested positive for COVID-19. The Thunder were one of the 22 teams invited to the NBA Bubble on June 4.

The Thunder faced the Rockets in the first round. However, they lost in a decisive game 7, extending the Thunder's postseason series victory drought to 4 seasons. Despite their loss, the Thunder set some records during the series, such as Chris Paul becoming the oldest player to record a triple-double, and rookie Luguentz Dort joined LeBron James and Kobe Bryant as the only players 21 years old or younger to score over 25 points in a game 7 playoff game.

Until 2024, this season marked the last time the Thunder made the playoffs.

After 5 years as head coach, Billy Donovan’s contract was not renewed following the season, and both sides agreed to mutually part ways.

== Previous season ==
The Thunder finished the 2018–19 season 49–33 to finish in fourth place in the Northwest Division, sixth in the Western Conference and qualified for the playoffs.

After falling to the Utah Jazz led by rookie Donovan Mitchell in the 2018 NBA Playoffs, the Thunder faced personnel decisions after acquiring Paul George and Carmelo Anthony in the offseason. Coming off his lowest scoring season, the Thunder traded Anthony to the Atlanta Hawks for Dennis Schröder, placing Schröder into a sixth man role. After the season ended, Anthony rejected the idea of coming off the bench while preferring to play more with the ball in his hands. In free agency, the Thunder re-signed George to a four-year, $137 million deal to stay with spending the year convincing their star to stay.

== Offseason ==
=== Draft picks ===
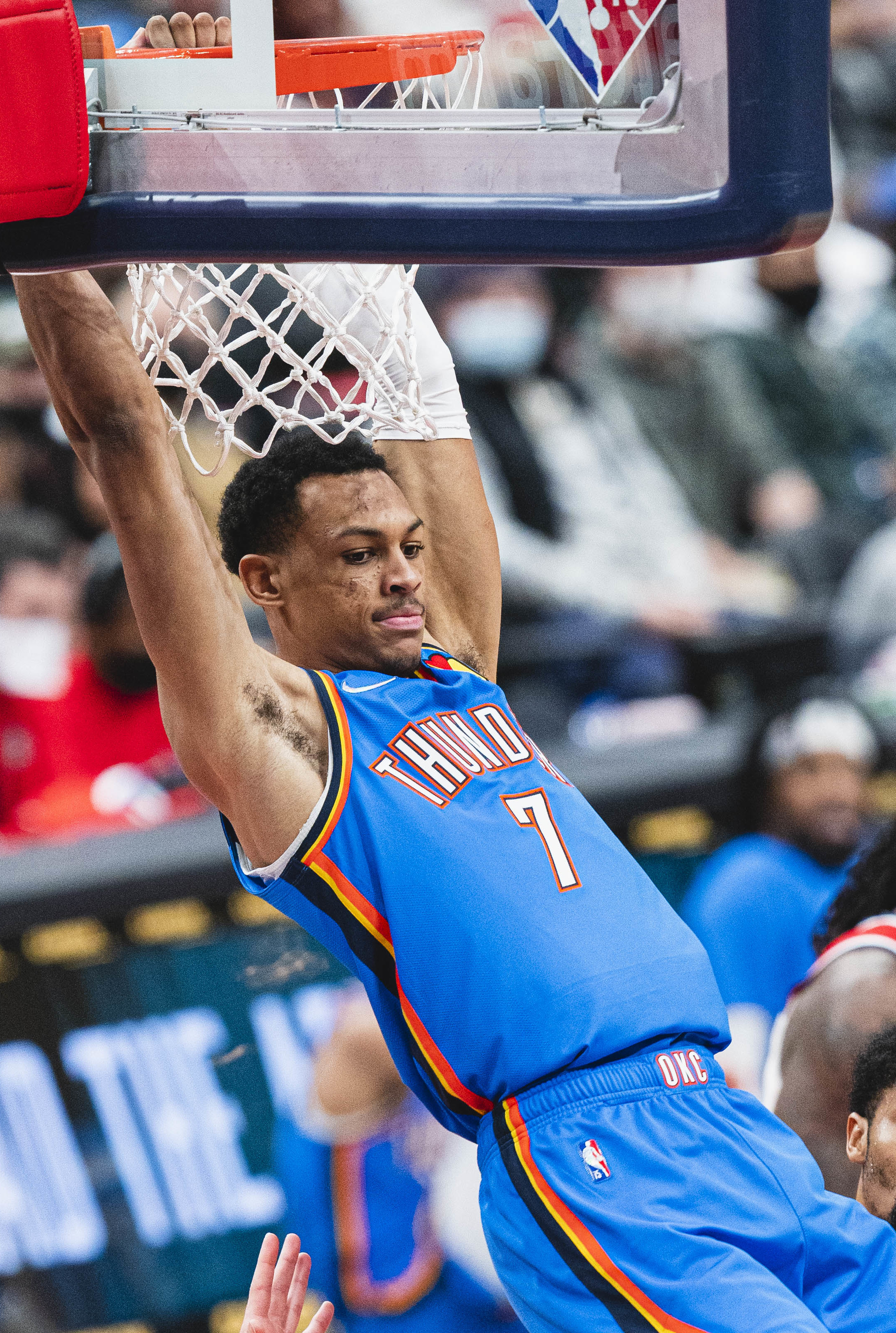
Darius Bazley was selected 23rd overall and was later traded to the Oklahoma City Thunder.

Round	Pick	Player	Position	Nationality	College
1	21	Brandon Clarke	Power Forward	Canada	Gonzaga
Darius Bazley was later traded to the Thunder via Utah Jazz

The Thunder had only their own first-round pick entering the draft. The Thunder traded their 2019 second-round pick in the Hamidou Diallo trade from the Charlotte Hornets back in 2018. On draft night, the Thunder traded the draft rights to Brandon Clarke, the twenty-first pick, to the Memphis Grizzlies in exchange for the draft rights to Darius Bazley, the twenty-third pick, and a 2024 second-round pick. At the conclusion of player acquisitions and transactions on 2019 NBA draft night they ended with adding Princeton High School forward Darius Bazley.

=== Trades ===
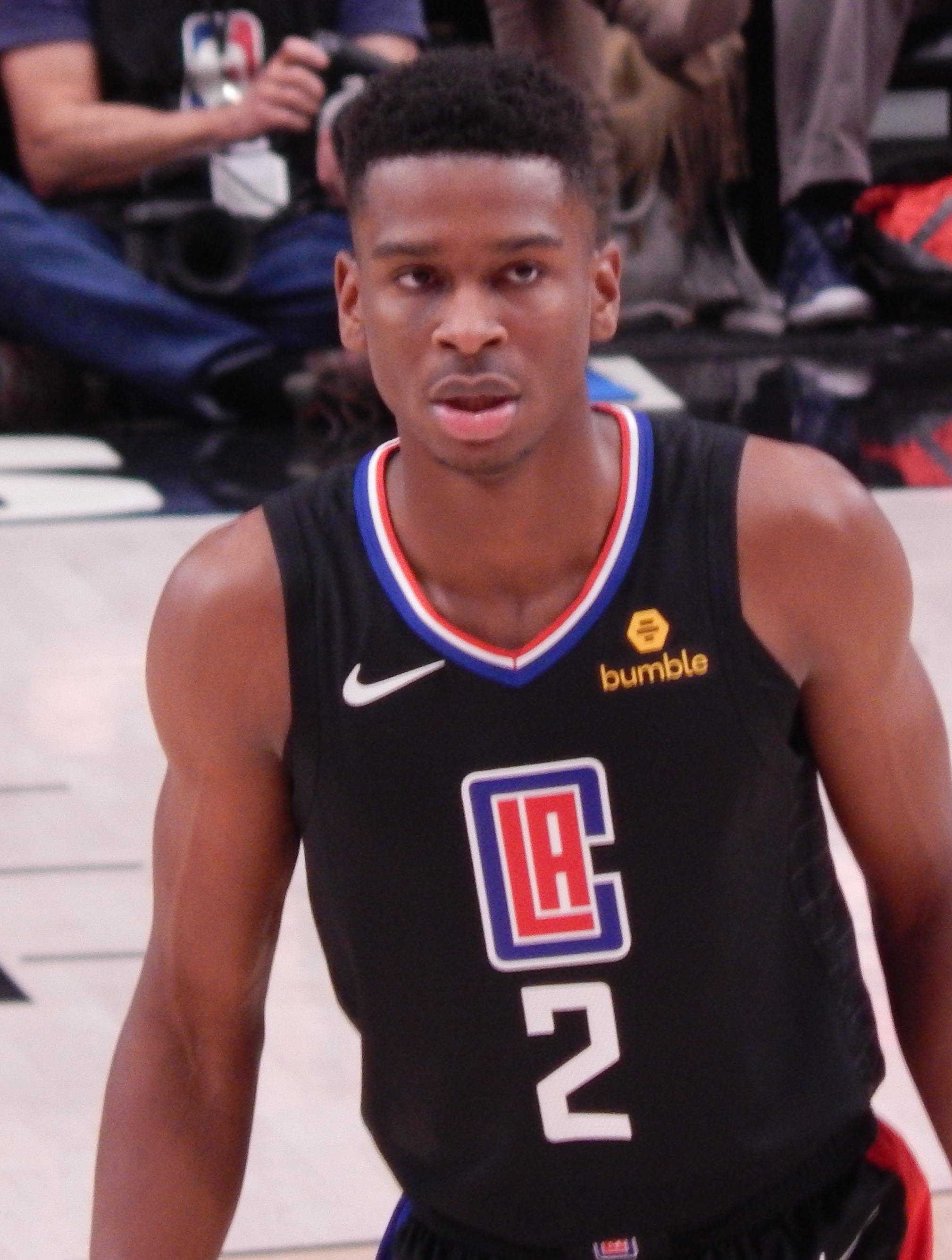
Shai Gilgeous-Alexander was traded to the Thunder.

On July 6, the Thunder traded the draft rights to Brandon Clarke, the twenty-first pick, to the Memphis Grizzlies in exchange for the draft rights to Darius Bazley, the twenty-third pick, and a 2024 second-round pick. On July 6, it was reported that the Thunder traded Paul George to the Los Angeles Clippers in exchange for a record-setting of draft choices after free agent Kawhi Leonard signed with the Clippers, which was finalized on July 10. Leonard had spent the offseason recruiting George, who reportedly requested a trade to join Leonard and the Clippers. The Thunder traded George post-extension to the Los Angeles Clippers in exchange for Shai Gilgeous-Alexander, Danilo Gallinari, a 2021 first-round pick via MIA, a 2022 first-round pick via LAC, a 2023 first-round pick via MIA, rights to swap 2023 first-round picks with LAC, a 2024 first-round pick via LAC, rights to swap 2025 first-round picks with LAC and a 2026 first-round pick via LAC. George joined the Clippers coming off of being named to his first All-NBA First Team, a finalist for the Defensive Player of the Year Award, earning All-Defensive First Team honors and finishing third for the NBA Most Valuable Player award.

From the time that Paul and his representation made us aware of what had been transpiring and their subsequent request, our focus as an organization was identifying the best paths for our future. The Thunder thanks Paul for his contributions to the organization and our community. We are proud that Paul is a part of our history as an organization and that some of the best basketball of his career was in Oklahoma City. He should be remembered fondly; we wish him and his family the best.

— Sam Presti

Following George's trade request, Russell Westbrook's future with the Thunder was "certainly in question." It was reported that the Thunder would also trade Jerami Grant to the Denver Nuggets in exchange for a 2020 first-round pick, which was finalized on July 8. By trading Grant, the Thunder saved $39 million in salary and tax.

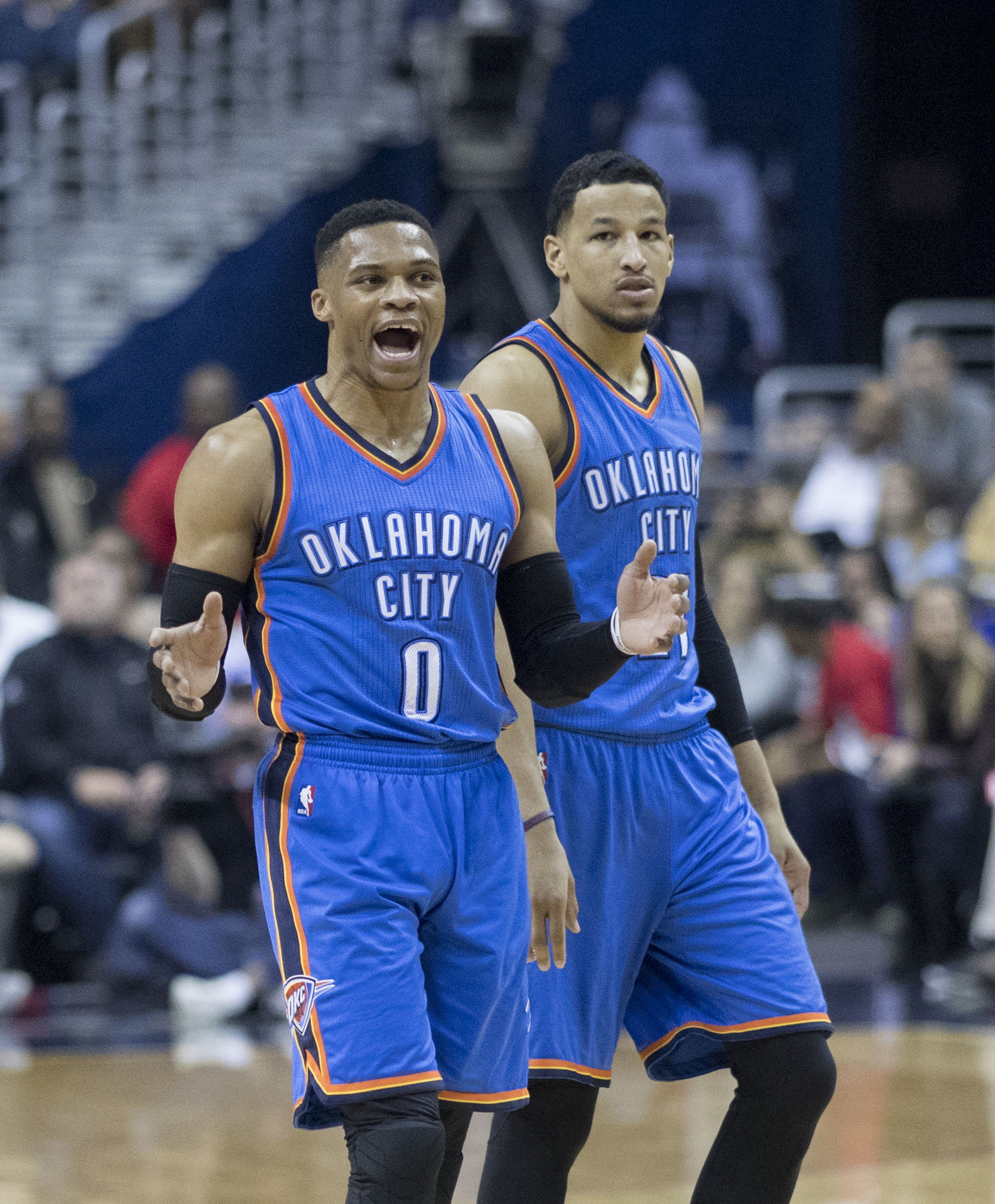
Russell Westbrook was traded to the Houston Rockets after eleven seasons with the Thunder.

On July 11, it was reported that the Thunder traded Russell Westbrook to the Houston Rockets in exchange for Chris Paul, rights to swap 2021 first-round picks, a 2024 first-round pick, rights to swap 2025 first-round picks and a 2026 first-round pick, which was finalized on July 16. With George departing, Westbrook's future with the Thunder was in jeopardy and the two sides worked together on a trade. Sam Presti worked with Westbrook and his representatives to honor Westbrook's desires of playing with the Houston Rockets to reunite with James Harden. Since the 2019 NBA draft, the Thunder had accumulated eight first-round picks in embracing a full rebuild of the team. Having spent eleven seasons with the Thunder, Westbrook left Oklahoma City as the franchise's all-time leader in points, second in assists, third in rebounds and steals. Westbrook was the NBA Most Valuable Player in the 2016-17 season, an eight-time All-Star, All-NBA First Team honors twice, All-NBA Second Team honors five times, as well as accruing two scoring titles and an assists leader title.

Russell Westbrook is the most important player in the brief history of the Oklahoma City Thunder. He has left an indelible mark on this team, city and state. None of us could have anticipated the player he has become, and we are all deeply proud of what he has contributed to the success of the franchise and to our community. Russell and his wife Nina, their three children, his brother and his parents will always remain part of the Thunder family. We wish them nothing but happiness and success in the future.

— Sam Presti

=== Free agency ===
For this offseason, free agency began on June 30, 2019, while the July moratorium ended on July 6. Jawun Evans, Raymond Felton, Markieff Morris and Nerlens Noel were set to hit unrestricted free agency. On July 6, Nerlens Noel agreed to a deal to stay with the Thunder. The same day, Markieff Morris signed a deal with the Detroit Pistons. Evans was not re-signed by the Thunder, joined the Raptors 905 of the NBA G League.

On June 30 and July 1, it was reported that Mike Muscala and Alec Burks agreed to a deal with the Thunder. However, after the Paul George trade, the Thunder allowed both Muscala and Burks to re-evaluate their situations to remain with the Thunder. Burks instead signed a one-year deal with the Golden State Warriors while Muscala remained with the Thunder. Muscala will later sign with the Thunder on July 10.

On July 6, Luguentz Dort signed a two-way contract with the Thunder. Dort came undrafted out of Arizona State. On August 13, Justin Patton signed a contract with the Thunder. Patton spent the 2018-19 season with the Philadelphia 76ers. To fill in the other two-way slot, Devon Hall signed a two-way contract with the Thunder on September 4. Hall was originally selected 53rd overall in the 2018 NBA draft but did not sign a contract in the 2018-19 season, instead playing a season with Cairns Taipans.

On July 25, Donte Grantham was waived by the Thunder. On August 1, Patrick Patterson was waived by the Thunder following a contract buyout.

=== Front office and coaching changes ===
On July 23, the Thunder announced David Akinyooye, Dave Bliss, Mark Daigneault, Brian Keefe and Mike Wilks as assistant coaches. Akinyooye joins the Thunder after serving four seasons as the assistant coach for the Oklahoma City Blue. Bliss joins the coaching staff after serving as a senior player development for the Thunder with previous experience with the New York Knicks. Daigneault joins the Thunder after serving five seasons as the head coach for the Blue. Keefe joins the Thunder after previously serving five seasons with the Thunder back in 2008 to 2013. Wilks joins the coaching staff after serving as a senior pro evaluation scout for the Thunder. Wilks became the second former Thunder player since Royal Ivey to join the team's coaching staff.

== Roster ==
2019-20 Oklahoma City Thunder roster
Players

Pos.	No.	Player	Height	Weight	DOB	From
C	12	Steven Adams	6 ft 11 in (2.11 m)	265 lb (120 kg)	1993-07-20	Pittsburgh
G/F	7	Darius Bazley	6 ft 8 in (2.03 m)	208 lb (94 kg)	2000-06-12	Princeton HS (OH)
G	30	Deonte Burton	6 ft 4 in (1.93 m)	240 lb (109 kg)	1994-01-31	Iowa State
G	6	Hamidou Diallo	6 ft 5 in (1.96 m)	202 lb (92 kg)	1998-07-31	Kentucky
G	5	Luguentz Dort	6 ft 3 in (1.91 m)	215 lb (98 kg)	1999-04-19	Arizona State
G	23	Terrance Ferguson	6 ft 6 in (1.98 m)	190 lb (86 kg)	1998-05-17	Advanced Prep International (TX)
F	8	Danilo Gallinari	6 ft 10 in (2.08 m)	233 lb (106 kg)	1988-08-08	Italy
G	2	Shai Gilgeous-Alexander	6 ft 5 in (1.96 m)	180 lb (82 kg)	1998-07-12	Kentucky
G	14	Devon Hall (TW)	6 ft 5 in (1.96 m)	215 lb (98 kg)	1995-07-07	Virginia
F	15	Kevin Hervey (TW)	6 ft 9 in (2.06 m)	230 lb (104 kg)	1996-07-09	UT Arlington
F/C	33	Mike Muscala	6 ft 10 in (2.08 m)	240 lb (109 kg)	1991-07-01	Bucknell
F	11	Abdel Nader	6 ft 5 in (1.96 m)	225 lb (102 kg)	1993-09-25	Iowa State
F/C	9	Nerlens Noel	6 ft 11 in (2.11 m)	230 lb (104 kg)	1994-04-10	Kentucky
G	3	Chris Paul	6 ft 1 in (1.85 m)	175 lb (79 kg)	1985-05-06	Wake Forest
G/F	21	André Roberson	6 ft 7 in (2.01 m)	210 lb (95 kg)	1991-12-04	Colorado
F	22	Isaiah Roby	6 ft 8 in (2.03 m)	230 lb (104 kg)	1998-02-03	Nebraska
G	17	Dennis Schröder	6 ft 1 in (1.85 m)	172 lb (78 kg)	1993-09-15	Germany

Coaches
Head coach
- Billy Donovan
Assistant(s)
- David Akinyooye
- Vin Bhavnani
- Dave Bliss
- Maurice Cheeks
- Mark Daigneault
- Brian Keefe
- Mike Wilks

Legend
- (DP) Unsigned draft pick
- (FA) Free agent
- (S) Suspended
- (GL) On assignment to G League affiliate
- (TW) Two-way affiliate player
- Injured

Roster
Updated: 2020-01-24

== Standings ==
=== Conference ===
Western Conference
#	Team	W	L	PCT	GB	GP
1	c – Los Angeles Lakers *	52	19	.732	–	71
2	x – Los Angeles Clippers	49	23	.681	3.5	72
3	y – Denver Nuggets *	46	27	.630	7.0	73
4	y – Houston Rockets *	44	28	.611	8.5	72
5	x – Oklahoma City Thunder	44	28	.611	8.5	72
6	x – Utah Jazz	44	28	.611	8.5	72
7	x – Dallas Mavericks	43	32	.573	11.0	75
8	x – Portland Trail Blazers	35	39	.473	18.5	74
9	pi – Memphis Grizzlies	34	39	.466	19.0	73
10	Phoenix Suns	34	39	.466	19.0	73
11	San Antonio Spurs	32	39	.451	20.0	71
12	Sacramento Kings	31	41	.431	21.5	72
13	New Orleans Pelicans	30	42	.417	22.5	72
14	Minnesota Timberwolves	19	45	.297	29.5	64
15	Golden State Warriors	15	50	.231	34.0	65

=== Division ===
Northwest Division	W	L	PCT	GB	Home	Road	Div	GP
y – Denver Nuggets	46	27	.630	–	26‍–‍11	20‍–‍16	12–2	73
x – Oklahoma City Thunder	44	28	.611	1.5	23‍–‍14	21‍–‍14	8–5	72
x – Utah Jazz	44	28	.611	1.5	23‍–‍12	21‍–‍16	5–7	72
x – Portland Trail Blazers	35	39	.473	11.5	21‍–‍15	14‍–‍24	5–8	74
Minnesota Timberwolves	19	45	.297	22.5	8‍–‍24	11‍–‍21	2–10	64

== Game log ==
=== Preseason ===
2019 preseason game log
Total: 2–2 (home:2–1; road:0–1)
Preseason: 2–2 (home: 2–1; road: 0–1)

Game	Date	Team	Score	High points	High rebounds	High assists	Location Attendance	Record
1	October 8	Dallas	W 119–104	Shai Gilgeous-Alexander (24)	Danilo Gallinari (9)	Dennis Schröder (5)	BOK Center; 12,055	1–0
2	October 10	New Zealand Breakers	W 110–84	Steven Adams (19)	Steven Adams (10)	Dennis Schröder (6)	Chesapeake Energy Arena; N/A	2–0
3	October 14	@ Dallas	L 70–107	Gilgeous-Alexander & Gallinari (16)	Shai Gilgeous-Alexander (8)	Dennis Schröder (6)	American Airlines Center; 15,305	2–1
4	October 16	Memphis	L 119–124	Devon Hall (19)	Danilo Gallinari (10)	Bazley & Schröder (6)	Chesapeake Energy Arena; 1,000	2–2

2019–20 season schedule

2019 preseason game log
Total: 3–0 (home: 1–0; road: 2–0)
Scrimmages: 3–0 (home: 1–0; road: 2–0)

Game	Date	Team	Score	High points	High rebounds	High assists	Location Attendance	Record
1	July 24	@ Boston	W 98–84	Adams & Gilgeous-Alexander (17)	Adams & Bazley (7)	Chris Paul (5)	Visa Athletic Center; No In-Person Attendance	1–0
2	July 26	Philadelphia	W 102–97	Shai Gilgeous-Alexander (16)	Steven Adams (9)	Shai Gilgeous-Alexander (5)	HP Field House; No In-Person Attendance	2–0
3	July 28	@ Portland	W 131–120	Darius Bazley (20)	Mike Muscala (6)	Schröder & Gilgeous-Alexander (7)	Visa Athletic Center; No In-Person Attendance	3–0

2019–20 season schedule

=== Regular season ===
2019–20 game log
Total: 44–28 (home: 23–14; road: 21–14)
October: 1–4 (home: 1–2; road: 0–2)

Game	Date	Team	Score	High points	High rebounds	High assists	Location Attendance	Record
1	October 23	@ Utah	L 95–100	Shai Gilgeous-Alexander (26)	Steven Adams (11)	Dennis Schröder (4)	Vivint Smart Home Arena; 18,306	0–1
2	October 25	Washington	L 85–97	Shai Gilgeous-Alexander (28)	Steven Adams (14)	Shai Gilgeous-Alexander (4)	Chesapeake Energy Arena; 18,203	0–2
3	October 27	Golden State	W 120–92	Dennis Schröder (22)	Gilgeous-Alexander & Adams (9)	Dennis Schröder (6)	Chesapeake Energy Arena; 18,203	1–2
4	October 28	@ Houston	L 112–116	Gilgeous-Alexander & Schröder (22)	Steven Adams (12)	Dennis Schröder (7)	Toyota Center; 18,055	1–3
5	October 30	Portland	L 99–102	Chris Paul (21)	Nerlens Noel (14)	Chris Paul (5)	Chesapeake Energy Arena; 18,203	1–4

November: 6–7 (home: 5–2; road: 1–5)

Game	Date	Team	Score	High points	High rebounds	High assists	Location Attendance	Record
6	November 2	New Orleans	W 115–104	Shai Gilgeous-Alexander (23)	Dennis Schröder (9)	Chris Paul (9)	Chesapeake Energy Arena; 18,203	2–4
7	November 5	Orlando	W 102–94	Shai Gilgeous-Alexander (24)	Steven Adams (11)	Chris Paul (6)	Chesapeake Energy Arena; 18,203	3–4
8	November 7	@ San Antonio	L 112–121	Danilo Gallinari (27)	Nerlens Noel (6)	Dennis Schröder (9)	AT&T Center; 18,354	3–5
9	November 9	Golden State	W 114–108	Danilo Gallinari (21)	Steven Adams (8)	Chris Paul (9)	Chesapeake Energy Arena; 18,203	4–5
10	November 10	Milwaukee	L 119–121	Dennis Schröder (25)	Danilo Gallinari (7)	Noel & Gilgeous-Alexander (6)	Chesapeake Energy Arena; 18,203	4–6
11	November 12	@ Indiana	L 85–111	Danilo Gallinari (14)	Bazley & Gilgeous-Alexander (6)	Chris Paul (8)	Bankers Life Fieldhouse; 15,838	4–7
12	November 15	Philadelphia	W 127–119 (OT)	Danilo Gallinari (28)	Chris Paul (8)	Chris Paul (5)	Chesapeake Energy Arena; 18,203	5–7
13	November 18	@ L. A. Clippers	L 88–90	Chris Paul (22)	Steven Adams (10)	Steven Adams (6)	Staples Center; 19,068	5–8
14	November 19	@ L.A. Lakers	L 107–112	Dennis Schröder (31)	Nerlens Noel (8)	Chris Paul (10)	Staples Center; 18,997	5–9
15	November 22	L. A. Lakers	L 127–130	Shai Gilgeous-Alexander (24)	Shai Gilgeous-Alexander (7)	Chris Paul (7)	Chesapeake Energy Arena; 18,203	5–10
16	November 25	@ Golden State	W 100–97	Dennis Schröder (22)	Steven Adams (10)	Danilo Gallinari (6)	Chase Center; 18,064	6–10
17	November 27	@ Portland	L 119–136	Abdel Nader (23)	Adams & Burton (6)	Gilgeous-Alexander & Paul (5)	Moda Center; 19,870	6–11
18	November 29	New Orleans	W 109–104	Dennis Schröder (25)	Steven Adams (12)	Dennis Schröder (7)	Chesapeake Energy Arena; 18,203	7–11

December: 10–4 (home: 6–2; road: 4–2)

Game	Date	Team	Score	High points	High rebounds	High assists	Location Attendance	Record
19	December 1	@ New Orleans	W 107–104	Danilo Gallinari (23)	Danilo Gallinari (11)	Chris Paul (8)	Smoothie King Center; 15,427	8–11
20	December 4	Indiana	L 100–107	Steven Adams (20)	Steven Adams (9)	Chris Paul (10)	Chesapeake Energy Arena; 18,203	8–12
21	December 6	Minnesota	W 139–127 (OT)	Chris Paul (30)	Steven Adams (11)	Chris Paul (7)	Chesapeake Energy Arena; 18,203	9–12
22	December 8	@ Portland	W 108–96	Gilgeous-Alexander & Schröder (21)	Nerlens Noel (12)	Steven Adams (4)	Moda Center; 19,393	10–12
23	December 9	@ Utah	W 104–90	Dennis Schröder (27)	Steven Adams (13)	Chris Paul (7)	Vivint Smart Home Arena; 18,306	11–12
24	December 11	@ Sacramento	L 93–94	Dennis Schröder (17)	Steven Adams (11)	Chris Paul (12)	Golden 1 Center; 16,723	11–13
25	December 14	@ Denver	L 102–110	Dennis Schröder (22)	Steven Adams (14)	Chris Paul (10)	Pepsi Center; 19,520	11–14
26	December 16	Chicago	W 109–106	Chris Paul (30)	Steven Adams (11)	Chris Paul (8)	Chesapeake Energy Arena; 18,203	12–14
27	December 18	Memphis	W 126–122	Dennis Schröder (31)	Steven Adams (10)	Dennis Schröder (7)	Chesapeake Energy Arena; 18,203	13–14
28	December 20	Phoenix	W 126–108	Shai Gilgeous-Alexander (32)	Schröder & Adams (9)	Chris Paul (7)	Chesapeake Energy Arena; 18,203	14–14
29	December 22	L. A. Clippers	W 118–112	Shai Gilgeous-Alexander (32)	Steven Adams (17)	Paul & Schröder (6)	Chesapeake Energy Arena; 18,203	15–14
30	December 26	Memphis	L 97–110	Chris Paul (23)	Adams & Paul (6)	Chris Paul (11)	Chesapeake Energy Arena; 18,203	15–15
31	December 27	@ Charlotte	W 104–102 (OT)	Shai Gilgeous-Alexander (27)	Steven Adams (12)	Chris Paul (6)	Spectrum Center; 18,418	16–15
32	December 29	@ Toronto	W 98–97	Shai Gilgeous-Alexander (32)	Chris Paul (11)	Chris Paul (8)	Scotiabank Arena; 19,800	17–15
33	December 31	Dallas	W 106–101	Gallinari & Schröder (20)	Nerlens Noel (12)	Chris Paul (7)	Chesapeake Energy Arena; 18,203	18–15

January: 12–5 (home: 3–4; road: 9–1)

Game	Date	Team	Score	High points	High rebounds	High assists	Location Attendance	Record
34	January 2	@ San Antonio	W 109–103	Shai Gilgeous-Alexander (25)	Steven Adams (9)	Gilgeous-Alexander & Paul (5)	AT&T Center; 18,354	19–15
35	January 4	@ Cleveland	W 121–106	Dennis Schröder (22)	Steven Adams (16)	Chris Paul (10)	Rocket Mortgage FieldHouse; 19,432	20–15
36	January 6	@ Philadelphia	L 113–120	Steven Adams (24)	Steven Adams (15)	Chris Paul (6)	Wells Fargo Center; 20,561	20–16
37	January 7	@ Brooklyn	W 111–103 (OT)	Chris Paul (28)	Steven Adams (18)	Dennis Schröder (5)	Barclays Center; 15,677	21–16
38	January 9	Houston	W 113–92	Danilo Gallinari (23)	Danilo Gallinari (11)	Chris Paul (5)	Chesapeake Energy Arena; 18,203	22–16
39	January 11	L. A. Lakers	L 110–125	Gilgeous-Alexander & Gallinari (24)	Gilgeous-Alexander & Adams (8)	Chris Paul (8)	Chesapeake Energy Arena; 18,203	22–17
40	January 13	@ Minnesota	W 117–104	Danilo Gallinari (30)	Shai Gilgeous-Alexander (20)	Shai Gilgeous-Alexander (10)	Target Center; 11,044	23–17
41	January 15	Toronto	L 121–130	Dennis Schröder (25)	Shai Gilgeous-Alexander (6)	Chris Paul (11)	Chesapeake Energy Arena; 18,203	23–18
42	January 17	Miami	L 108–115	Danilo Gallinari (27)	Dennis Schröder (7)	Gilgeous-Alexander & Schröder (8)	Chesapeake Energy Arena; 18,203	23–19
43	January 18	Portland	W 119–106	Chris Paul (30)	Darius Bazley (13)	Chris Paul (7)	Chesapeake Energy Arena; 18,203	24–19
44	January 20	@ Houston	W 112–107	Chris Paul (28)	Danilo Gallinari (13)	Dennis Schröder (4)	Toyota Center; 18,055	25–19
45	January 22	@ Orlando	W 120–114	Dennis Schröder (31)	Shai Gilgeous-Alexander (12)	Dennis Schröder (9)	Amway Center; 18,846	26–19
46	January 24	Atlanta	W 140–111	Danilo Gallinari (25)	Dennis Schröder (8)	Dennis Schröder (8)	Chesapeake Energy Arena; 18,203	27–19
47	January 25	@ Minnesota	W 113–104	Dennis Schröder (26)	Hamidou Diallo (10)	Chris Paul (10)	Target Center; 16,236	28–19
48	January 27	Dallas	L 97–107	Dennis Schröder (21)	Shai Gilgeous-Alexander (11)	Gallinari & Schröder (6)	Chesapeake Energy Arena; 18,203	28–20
49	January 29	@ Sacramento	W 120–100	Dennis Schröder (24)	Steven Adams (8)	Chris Paul (10)	Golden 1 Center; 16,935	29–20
50	January 31	@ Phoenix	W 111–107	Danilo Gallinari (27)	Shai Gilgeous-Alexander (9)	Chris Paul (10)	Talking Stick Resort Arena; 17,260	30–20

February: 7–3 (home: 5–2; road: 2–1)

Game	Date	Team	Score	High points	High rebounds	High assists	Location Attendance	Record
51	February 5	Cleveland	W 109–103	Dennis Schröder (30)	Shai Gilgeous-Alexander (10)	Chris Paul (7)	Chesapeake Energy Arena; 18,203	31–20
52	February 7	Detroit	W 108–101	Chris Paul (22)	Danilo Gallinari (9)	Chris Paul (7)	Chesapeake Energy Arena; 18,203	32–20
53	February 9	Boston	L 111–112	Gallinari & Gilgeous-Alexander (24)	Steven Adams (11)	Chris Paul (5)	Chesapeake Energy Arena; 18,203	32–21
54	February 11	San Antonio	L 106–114	Chris Paul (31)	Steven Adams (10)	Chris Paul (7)	Chesapeake Energy Arena; 18,203	32–22
55	February 13	@ New Orleans	W 123–118	Danilo Gallinari (29)	Steven Adams (11)	Chris Paul (12)	Smoothie King Center; 17,865	33–22
All-Star break
56	February 21	Denver	W 113–101	Chris Paul (29)	Steven Adams (17)	Shai Gilgeous-Alexander (9)	Chesapeake Energy Arena; 18,203	34–22
57	February 23	San Antonio	W 131–103	Shai Gilgeous-Alexander (22)	Steven Adams (14)	Chris Paul (10)	Chesapeake Energy Arena; 18,203	35–22
58	February 25	@ Chicago	W 124–122	Danilo Gallinari (24)	Shai Gilgeous-Alexander (11)	Chris Paul (9)	United Center; 16,911	36–22
59	February 27	Sacramento	W 112–108	Danilo Gallinari (24)	Adams & Noel (7)	Paul & Schröder (7)	Chesapeake Energy Arena; 18,203	37–22
60	February 28	@ Milwaukee	L 86–133	Chris Paul (18)	Steven Adams (7)	Chris Paul (5)	Fiserv Forum; 18,412	37–23

March: 3–1 (home: 0–1; road: 3–0)

Game	Date	Team	Score	High points	High rebounds	High assists	Location Attendance	Record
61	March 3	L. A. Clippers	L 94–109	Dennis Schröder (24)	Steven Adams (10)	Chris Paul (7)	Chesapeake Energy Arena; 18,203	37–24
62	March 4	@ Detroit	W 114–107	Shai Gilgeous-Alexander (27)	Adams & Gallinari (7)	Dennis Schröder (9)	Little Caesars Arena; 15,138	38–24
63	March 6	@ New York	W 126–103	Danilo Gallinari (22)	Steven Adams (11)	Chris Paul (12)	Madison Square Garden; 16,277	39–24
64	March 8	@ Boston	W 105–104	Chris Paul (28)	Nerlens Noel (9)	Chris Paul (7)	TD Garden; 19,156	40–24

Seeding games: 4–4 (home: 3–1; road: 1–3)

Game	Date	Team	Score	High points	High rebounds	High assists	Location Attendance	Record
65	August 1	Utah	W 110–94	Shai Gilgeous-Alexander (19)	Steven Adams (11)	Chris Paul (7)	The Arena; No In-Person Attendance	41–24
66	August 3	Denver	L 113–121 (OT)	Shai Gilgeous-Alexander (24)	Steven Adams (10)	Chris Paul (8)	The Arena; No In-Person Attendance	41–25
67	August 5	@ L. A. Lakers	W 105–86	Chris Paul (21)	4 players (7)	Chris Paul (6)	HP Field House; No In-Person Attendance	42–25
68	August 7	@ Memphis	L 92–121	Chris Paul (17)	Hamidou Diallo (8)	Chris Paul (5)	Visa Athletic Center; No In-Person Attendance	42–26
69	August 9	Washington	W 121–103	Darius Bazley (23)	Luguentz Dort (10)	Chris Paul (9)	The Arena; No In-Person Attendance	43–26
70	August 10	@ Phoenix	L 101–128	Darius Bazley (22)	Darius Bazley (10)	Chris Paul (7)	HP Field House; No In-Person Attendance	43–27
71	August 12	Miami	W 116–115	Darius Bazley (21)	Darius Bazley (9)	Terrance Ferguson (5)	Visa Athletic Center; No In-Person Attendance	44–27
72	August 14	@ L. A. Clippers	L 103–107 (OT)	Hamidou Diallo (27)	Hamidou Diallo (11)	Deonte Burton (5)	HP Field House; No In-Person Attendance	44–28

Cancelled games

Game	Date	Team	Score	High points	High rebounds	High assists	Location Attendance	Record
65	March 11	Utah					Chesapeake Energy Arena	
66	March 13	Minnesota					Chesapeake Energy Arena	
67	March 15	@ Washington					Capital One Arena	
68	March 17	@ Memphis					FedExForum	
69	March 18	@ Atlanta					State Farm Arena	
70	March 20	Denver					Chesapeake Energy Arena	
71	March 23	@ Miami					American Airlines Arena	
72	March 26	Charlotte					Chesapeake Energy Arena	
73	March 28	@ Golden State					Chase Center	
74	March 30	@ Denver					Pepsi Center	
75	April 1	Phoenix					Chesapeake Energy Arena	
76	April 4	@ LA Clippers					Staples Center	
77	April 5	@ LA Lakers					Staples Center	
78	April 7	Brooklyn					Chesapeake Energy Arena	
79	April 10	New York					Chesapeake Energy Arena	
80	April 11	@ Memphis					FedExForum	
81	April 13	Utah					Chesapeake Energy Arena	
82	April 15	@ Dallas					American Airlines Center	

2019–20 season schedule

=== Playoffs ===
2020 playoff game log
Total: 3–4 (home: 3–0; road: 0–4)
First round: 3–4 (home: 3–0; road: 0–4)

Game	Date	Team	Score	High points	High rebounds	High assists	Location Attendance	Series
1	August 18	@ Houston	L 108–123	Danilo Gallinari (29)	Steven Adams (12)	Chris Paul (9)	HP Field House; No In-Person Attendance	0–1
2	August 20	@Houston	L 98–111	Shai Gilgeous-Alexander (31)	Steven Adams (11)	Dennis Schröder (5)	The Arena; No In-Person Attendance	0–2
3	August 22	Houston	W 119–107 (OT)	Dennis Schröder (29)	Steven Adams (13)	Shai Gilgeous-Alexander (6)	HP Field House; No In-Person Attendance	1–2
4	August 24	Houston	W 117–114	Dennis Schröder (30)	Shai Gilgeous-Alexander (12)	Shai Gilgeous-Alexander (6)	The Arena; No In-Person Attendance	2–2
5	August 29	@ Houston	L 80–114	Dennis Schröder (19)	Steven Adams (12)	Shai Gilgeous-Alexander (4)	HP Field House; No In-Person Attendance	2–3
6	August 31	Houston	W 104–100	Chris Paul (28)	Steven Adams (14)	Shai Gilgeous-Alexander (6)	The Arena; No In-Person Attendance	3–3
7	September 2	@ Houston	L 102–104	Luguentz Dort (30)	Chris Paul (11)	Chris Paul (12)	The Arena; No In-Person Attendance	3–4

2020 playoff schedule

== Player statistics ==
Legend
GP	Games played	GS	Games started	MPG	Minutes per game
FG%	Field goal percentage	3P%	3-point field goal percentage	FT%	Free throw percentage
RPG	Rebounds per game	APG	Assists per game	SPG	Steals per game
BPG	Blocks per game	PPG	Points per game	**Bold**	Career high

=== Regular season ===
Oklahoma City Thunder statistics
Player	GP	GS	MPG	FG%	3P%	FT%	RPG	APG	SPG	BPG	PPG
Steven Adams	63	63	26.7	59.2%	33.3%	58.2%	9.3	2.3	0.8	1.1	10.9
Darius Bazley	61	9	18.5	39.4%	34.8%	69.4%	4.0	0.7	0.4	0.7	5.6
Deonte Burton	39	0	9.1	34.4%	18.9%	57.1%	1.5	0.4	0.2	0.3	2.7
Hamidou Diallo	46	3	19.5	44.6%	38.1%	60.3%	3.6	0.8	0.8	0.2	6.9
Luguentz Dort	36	28	22.8	39.4%	29.7%	79.2%	2.3	0.8	0.9	0.1	6.8
Terrance Ferguson	56	38	22.4	35.5%	29.2%	75.0%	1.3	0.9	0.5	0.3	3.9
Danilo Gallinari	62	62	29.6	43.8%	40.5%	89.3%	5.2	1.9	0.7	0.1	18.7
Shai Gilgeous-Alexander	70	70	34.7	47.1%	34.7%	80.7%	5.9	3.3	1.1	0.7	19.0
Devon Hall ^{‡} ^{≠}	11	0	7.4	20.0%	23.5%	50.0%	0.6	1.2	0.4	0.1	1.8
Kevin Hervey ^{≠}	10	0	5.2	25.9%	15.0%	-	1.2	0.5	0.1	0.1	1.7
Mike Muscala	47	2	12.2	40.7%	37.8%	81.8%	2.3	0.9	0.2	0.3	4.8
Abdel Nader	55	6	15.8	46.8%	37.5%	77.3%	1.8	0.7	0.4	0.4	6.3
Nerlens Noel	61	7	18.5	68.4%	33.3%	75.5%	4.9	0.9	1.0	1.5	7.4
Justin Patton ^{†}	5	0	4.8	40.0%	25.0%	-	1.0	0.4	0.0	0.0	1.8
Chris Paul	70	70	31.5	48.9%	36.5%	90.7%	5.0	6.7	1.6	0.2	17.6
Andre Roberson	7	0	12.4	27.6%	21.4%	50.0%	3.9	0.6	0.1	0.4	2.9
Isaiah Roby ^{≠}	3	0	3.7	0.0%	-	-	0.7	0.0	0.0	0.0	0.0
Dennis Schröder	62	2	30.8	46.9%	38.5%	83.9%	3.6	4.0	0.7	0.2	18.9

Led team in statistic

After all games.
^{‡} Waived during the season
^{†} Traded during the season
^{≠} Acquired during the season

=== Playoffs ===
Oklahoma City Thunder statistics
Player	GP	GS	MPG	FG%	3P%	FT%	RPG	APG	SPG	BPG	PPG
Steven Adams	7	7	30.0	59.6%	0.0%	45.0%	11.6	1.3	0.6	0.3	10.1
Darius Bazley	7	0	18.0	41.9%	50.0%	90.0%	6.7	0.9	0.0	0.4	6.6
Deonte Burton	1	0	2.0	-	-	-	0.0	0.0	0.0	0.0	0.0
Hamidou Diallo	3	0	8.3	36.4%	20.0%	57.1%	2.0	0.3	0.0	0.7	4.3
Luguentz Dort	6	6	29.2	35.5%	26.0%	53.3%	3.7	1.0	0.3	1.0	12.5
Terrance Ferguson	4	1	10.5	18.2%	20.0%	-	1.0	0.3	0.3	0.0	1.5
Danilo Gallinari	7	7	30.3	40.5%	32.4%	96.7%	5.4	1.0	0.7	0.1	15.0
Shai Gilgeous-Alexander	7	7	39.9	43.3%	40.0%	95.7%	5.3	4.1	1.0	0.4	16.3
Mike Muscala	2	0	10.0	50.0%	100%	-	2.0	0.5	0.0	0.0	1.5
Abdel Nader	3	0	8.3	14.3%	20.0%	50.0%	1.0	0.0	0.3	0.7	1.3
Nerlens Noel	7	0	13.9	47.1%	0.0%	50.0%	4.1	0.4	0.3	0.7	3.0
Chris Paul	7	7	37.3	49.1%	37.2%	88.5%	7.4	5.3	1.6	0.4	21.3
Andre Roberson	1	0	3.0	0.0%	0.0%	-	0.0	0.0	0.0	0.0	0.0
Dennis Schröder	7	0	32.4	40.0%	28.9%	80.0%	3.7	3.6	0.6	0.1	17.3

Led team in statistic

After all games.

=== Totals ===
==== Regular season ====
Player	Pos.	GP	GS	MP	Reb.	Ast.	Stl.	Blk.	Pts.
Steven Adams	C	63	63	1,689	583	146	51	67	684
Darius Bazley	PF	61	9	1,130	246	41	23	41	342
Deonte Burton	SG	39	0	356	57	17	7	10	104
Hamidou Diallo	SG	21	3	896	167	36	37	9	318
Luguentz Dort	SG	36	28	820	81	27	31	4	244
Terrance Ferguson	SG	56	38	1,257	74	51	27	17	220
Danilo Gallinari	PF	62	62	1,834	322	119	42	5	1,160
Shai Gilgeous-Alexander	SG	70	70	2,428	412	232	79	47	1,331
Devon Hall	SG	11	0	7	13	4	1	5	20
Kevin Hervey	PF	10	0	12	5	1	1	1	17
Mike Muscala	C	47	2	572	108	40	9	12	226
Abdel Nader	PF	55	6	572	100	38	23	20	241
Nerlens Noel	C	61	7	1,127	300	57	59	91	449
Justin Patton^{†}	C	5	0	24	5	2	0	0	9
Chris Paul	PG	70	70	2,208	349	472	111	11	1,232
Andre Roberson	SG	7	0	87	27	4	1	3	20
Isaiah Roby^{≠}	SF	3	0	11	2	0	0	0	0
Dennis Schröder	PG	65	2	1,999	236	262	45	14	1,229

After all games.
^{‡}Waived during the season
^{†}Traded during the season
^{≠}Acquired during the season

==== Playoffs ====
Player	Pos.	GP	GS	MP	Reb.	Ast.	Stl.	Blk.	Pts.
Steven Adams	C	7	7	210	81	9	4	2	71
Darius Bazley	PF	7	0	126	47	6	0	3	46
Deonte Burton	SG	1	0	2	0	0	0	0	0
Hamidou Diallo	SG	3	0	25	6	1	0	2	13
Luguentz Dort	SG	6	6	175	22	6	2	6	75
Terrance Ferguson	SG	4	1	42	4	1	1	0	6
Danilo Gallinari	PF	7	7	212	38	7	5	1	105
Shai Gilgeous-Alexander	SG	7	7	279	37	29	7	3	114
Mike Muscala	C	2	0	20	4	1	0	0	3
Abdel Nader	PF	3	0	25	3	0	1	2	4
Nerlens Noel	C	7	0	97	29	3	2	5	21
Chris Paul	PG	7	7	261	52	37	11	3	149
Andre Roberson	SG	1	0	3	0	0	0	0	0
Dennis Schröder	PG	7	0	227	26	25	4	1	121

=== Individual game highs ===
Category	Player	Statistic
Points	Shai Gilgeous-Alexander; Shai Gilgeous-Alexander; Shai Gilgeous-Alexander	32 vs Suns on December 20, 2019; 32 vs Clippers on December 22, 2019; 32 vs Raptors on December 29, 2019
Rebounds	Shai Gilgeous-Alexander	20 vs Timberwolves on January 13, 2020
Assists	Chris Paul; Chris Paul; Chris Paul	12 vs Kings on December 11, 2019; 12 vs Pelicans on February 13, 2020; 12 vs Knicks on March 6, 2020
Steals	Dennis Schröder; Chris Paul; Chris Paul; Chris Paul; Chris Paul; Chris Paul; Nerlens Noel; Steven Adams; Steven Adams; Danilo Gallinari; Chris Paul	4 vs Warriors on October 27, 2019; 4 vs Clippers on November 18, 2019; 4 vs Lakers on November 19, 2019; 4 vs Nuggets on December 14, 2019; 4 vs Rockets on January 9, 2020; 4 vs Raptors on January 15, 2020; 4 vs Kings on January 29, 2020; 4 vs Spurs on February 11, 2020; 4 vs Nuggets on February 21, 2020; 4 vs Pistons on March 4, 2020; 4 vs Grizzlies on August 7, 2020
Blocks	Nerlens Noel	6 vs Pelicans on November 2, 2019
Minutes	Shai Gilgeous-Alexander	41:32 vs Timberwolves on December 6, 2019

Category	Player	Statistic
Field goals made	Shai Gilgeous-Alexander; Dennis Schröder	13 vs Suns on December 20, 2019; 13 vs Magic on January 22, 2020
Threes Made	Danilo Gallinari	7 vs Heat on January 17, 2020
Free Throws Made	Chris Paul; Shai Gilgeous-Alexander	12 vs 76ers on November 15, 2019; 12 vs Timberwolves on December 6, 2019
Double-Doubles	Steven Adams	22
Triple-Doubles	Shai Gilgeous-Alexander	1

== Awards and records ==
=== Awards ===
Date	Player	Award
December 23, 2019	Dennis Schröder (1/1)	December 16–22 Player of the Week
January 2, 2020	Billy Donovan (1/1)	December Coach of the Month
January 30, 2020	Chris Paul	All-Star
September 16, 2020	Chris Paul	All-NBA Second Team
October 5, 2020	Chris Paul	NBA Cares Community Assist Award

== Transactions ==
=== Overview ===
Players Added

Via trade

- Darius Bazley
  (Draft rights)
- Danilo Gallinari
- Shai Gilgeous-Alexander
- Chris Paul

Via free agency

- Luguentz Dort
- Devon Hall
- Mike Muscala
- Justin Patton
Players Lost

Via trade

- Paul George
- Jerami Grant
- Russell Westbrook

Via free agency

- Jawun Evans
- Raymond Felton
- Markieff Morris

Waived

- Donte Grantham
- Patrick Patterson

=== Trades ===
July 6, 2019	To Oklahoma City Thunder Draft rights to Darius Bazley; 2024 second-round pick	To Memphis Grizzlies Draft rights to Brandon Clarke
July 8, 2019	To Oklahoma City Thunder 2020 first-round pick	To Denver Nuggets Jerami Grant
July 10, 2019	To Oklahoma City Thunder Shai Gilgeous-Alexander; Danilo Gallinari; 2021 first-round pick via MIA; 2022 first-round pick via LAC; 2023 first-round pick via MIA; 2024 first-round pick via LAC; 2026 first-round pick via LAC; Right to swap 2023 first-round pick with LAC; Right to swap 2025 first-round pick with LAC	To Los Angeles Clippers Paul George
July 16, 2019	To Oklahoma City Thunder Chris Paul; 2024 first-round pick 2026 first-round pick Right to swap 2021 first-round pick Right to swap 2025 first-round pick	To Houston Rockets Russell Westbrook
January 24, 2020	To Oklahoma City Thunder Isaiah Roby	To Dallas Mavericks Justin Patton

=== Free agency ===
==== Re-signed ====
Date	Player	Contract
July 6, 2019	Nerlens Noel	Standard
In-Season Re-Signings
June 24, 2020	Luguentz Dort	Multi-Year

==== Additions ====
Date	Player	Contract	Former team
July 6, 2019	Luguentz Dort	Two-Way	Arizona State (NCAA)
July 10, 2019	Mike Muscala	Standard	Los Angeles Lakers
August 13, 2019	Justin Patton	Standard	Philadelphia 76ers
September 4, 2019	Devon Hall	Two-Way	Cairns Taipans (NBL)
In-Season Additions
December 12, 2019	Kevin Hervey	Two-Way	Oklahoma City Blue (G League)
June 27, 2020	Devon Hall	Substitute Player	Oklahoma City Blue (G League)

==== Subtractions ====
Date	Player	Reason left	New team
July 1, 2019	Raymond Felton	Free Agent	N/A
July 1, 2019	Jawun Evans	Free Agent	Raptors 905 (G League)
July 6, 2019	Markieff Morris	Free Agent	Detroit Pistons
July 25, 2019	Donte Grantham	Waived	Agua Caliente Clippers (G League)
August 1, 2019	Patrick Patterson	Waived	Los Angeles Clippers
In-Season Subtractions
December 12, 2019	Devon Hall	Waived	Oklahoma City Blue (G League)
