= Royce O'Neale =

American basketball player (born 1993)

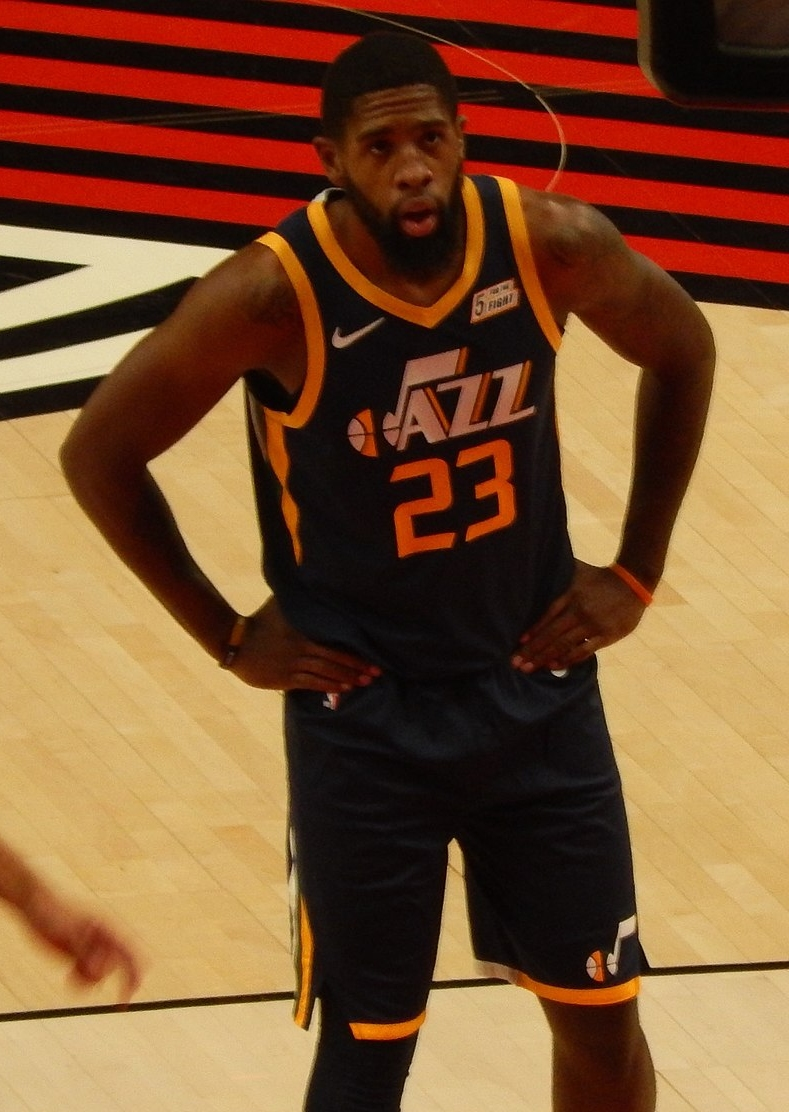
- O'Neale with the Utah Jazz in 2018

No. 00 – Charlotte Hornets
- Position: Small forward
- League: NBA

Personal information
- Born: June 5, 1993 (age 33) Killeen, Texas, U.S.
- Listed height: 6 ft 6 in (1.98 m)
- Listed weight: 226 lb (103 kg)

Career information
- High school: Harker Heights (Harker Heights, Texas)
- College: Denver (2011–2013); Baylor (2013–2015)
- NBA draft: 2015: undrafted
- Playing career: 2015–present

Career history
- 2015–2016: Riesen Ludwigsburg
- 2016–2017: Gran Canaria
- 2017–2022: Utah Jazz
- 2017: →Salt Lake City Stars
- 2022–2024: Brooklyn Nets
- 2024–2026: Phoenix Suns
- 2026–present: Charlotte Hornets

Career highlights
- Spanish Supercup winner (2016); Third-team All-WAC (2013)
- Stats at NBA.com
- Stats at Basketball Reference

Royce Khalil O'Neale (born June 5, 1993) is an American professional basketball player for the Charlotte Hornets of the National Basketball Association (NBA). He played college basketball for the Denver Pioneers and the Baylor Bears.

== College career ==
O'Neale, a small forward from Killeen, Texas, was recruited to the University of Denver out of Harker Heights High School. He played two seasons for the Pioneers, including an all-Western Athletic Conference (WAC) season in 2012–13, before transferring to Baylor University in 2013. Because he transferred to be closer to his family and ailing grandfather, the National Collegiate Athletic Association (NCAA) granted him a waiver to transfer rules, making him immediately eligible to play for the Bears instead of sitting out the customary year.

== Professional career ==
=== Riesen Ludwigsburg (2015–2016) ===
Following the close of his college career, O'Neale was not selected in the 2015 NBA draft. He played his first professional season in Germany for MHP Riesen Ludwigsburg, where he averaged 8.1 points and 4.5 rebounds per game.

=== Gran Canaria (2016–2017) ===
After playing for the Golden State Warriors' Summer League team in 2016, he signed with Spanish club Herbalife Gran Canaria for the 2016–17 season.

=== Utah Jazz (2017–2022) ===
On June 25, 2017, O'Neale signed with Lithuanian club Žalgiris Kaunas. However, he never played a game for the team.

After playing for the Utah Jazz in the 2017 NBA Summer League, he was signed to the team for the 2017–18 season due to the exception left in the contract with Žalgiris Kaunas. O'Neale made his NBA debut on October 21, 2017, playing a single minute in their 96–87 win against the Oklahoma City Thunder. On February 14, 2018, he scored 19 points in a home game against the Phoenix Suns.

After the game on November 12, 2019, against the Brooklyn Nets, O’Neale traded jerseys with former Baylor Bears teammate Taurean Prince.

On January 19, 2020, the Utah Jazz announced that they had signed O’Neale to a four-year, $36 million contract extension.

=== Brooklyn Nets (2022–2024) ===
On June 30, 2022, O'Neale was traded to the Brooklyn Nets in exchange for a 2023 first-round draft pick. On November 17, O'Neale put up 11 points, alongside a game-winning tip, with 10 rebounds, and 11 assists for his first career triple-double in a 109–107 win over the Portland Trail Blazers.

On January 8, 2023, O'Neale put up a game-winning putback in a 102–101 win over the Miami Heat. O'Neale made 76 appearances (including 53 starts) for Brooklyn during the 2022–23 NBA season, averaging 8.8 points, 5.1 rebounds, and 3.7 assists.

O'Neale played in 49 games (starting six) for the Nets during the 2023–24 NBA season, logging averages of 7.4 points, 4.5 rebounds, and 2.8 assists.

=== Phoenix Suns (2024–2026) ===
On February 8, 2024, O'Neale was traded to the Phoenix Suns for Keita Bates-Diop, Jordan Goodwin, and 3 second round picks in a three-team trade that also involved the Memphis Grizzlies' David Roddy, Chimezie Metu, Yuta Watanabe, and a 2026 first round pick swap. He made 30 appearances (eight starts) down the stretch for Phoenix, averaging 8.1 points, 5.2 rebounds, and 2.7 assists.

On July 6, 2024, O'Neale re-signed with the Suns on a four-year, $42 million contract. On October 31, O'Neale scored a career-high 21 points in a 125–119 win over the Los Angeles Clippers. He made 75 appearances (22 starts) for the Suns during the 2024–25 NBA season, averaging 9.1 points, 4.7 rebounds, and 2.2 assists.

O'Neale played in 78 appearances (including 67 starts) for Phoenix in the 2025–26 season, recording averages of 9.8 points (a career–high), 4.8 rebounds, and 2.7 assists.

=== Charlotte Hornets (2026–present) ===
On July 13, 2026, O'Neale, Grayson Allen, and a 2033 first-round pick were traded to the Charlotte Hornets in exchange for Miles Bridges, a 2029 first-round pick and a 2027 second-round pick. On October 21, O'Neale made his Hornets debut, logging eight points and four rebounds in a 110–103 win over the Brooklyn Nets.

== Career statistics ==
Legend
| GP | Games played | GS | Games started | MPG | Minutes per game |
| FG% | Field goal percentage | 3P% | 3-point field goal percentage | FT% | Free throw percentage |
| RPG | Rebounds per game | APG | Assists per game | SPG | Steals per game |
| BPG | Blocks per game | PPG | Points per game | **Bold** | Career high |
| * | Led the league |

=== NBA ===
==== Regular season ====
| Year | Team | GP | GS | MPG | FG% | 3P% | FT% | RPG | APG | SPG | BPG | PPG |
|---|---|---|---|---|---|---|---|---|---|---|---|---|
| 2017–18 | Utah | 69 | 4 | 16.7 | .423 | .356 | .803 | 3.4 | 1.4 | .5 | .2 | 5.0 |
| 2018–19 | Utah | **82*** | 16 | 20.4 | **.475** | .386 | .762 | 3.5 | 1.5 | .7 | .3 | 5.2 |
| 2019–20 | Utah | 71 | 62 | 28.9 | .433 | .377 | .764 | 5.5 | 2.5 | .8 | .5 | 6.3 |
| 2020–21 | Utah | 71 | 71 | 31.6 | .444 | .385 | **.848** | **6.8** | 2.5 | .8 | .5 | 7.0 |
| 2021–22 | Utah | 77 | **77** | 31.2 | .457 | .389 | .804 | 4.8 | 2.5 | **1.1** | .4 | 7.4 |
| 2022–23 | Brooklyn | 76 | 53 | **31.7** | .386 | .389 | .725 | 5.1 | **3.7** | .9 | **.6** | 8.8 |
| 2023–24 | Brooklyn | 49 | 6 | 24.5 | .388 | .366 | .682 | 4.5 | 2.8 | .7 | **.6** | 7.4 |
| 2023–24 | Phoenix | 30 | 8 | 25.1 | .411 | .376 | .692 | 5.2 | 2.7 | .9 | .5 | 8.1 |
| 2024–25 | Phoenix | 75 | 22 | 24.5 | .423 | .406 | .731 | 4.7 | 2.2 | .9 | .5 | 9.1 |
| 2025–26 | Phoenix | 78 | 67 | 28.4 | .421 | **.408** | .711 | 4.8 | 2.7 | **1.1** | .4 | **9.8** |
| Career | | 678 | 386 | 26.4 | .425 | .389 | .765 | 4.8 | 2.4 | .8 | .4 | 7.4 |

==== Playoffs ====
| Year | Team | GP | GS | MPG | FG% | 3P% | FT% | RPG | APG | SPG | BPG | PPG |
|---|---|---|---|---|---|---|---|---|---|---|---|---|
| 2018 | Utah | **11** | 5 | 23.5 | .500 | .357 | .632 | 3.5 | 1.4 | .9 | **.4** | 7.1 |
| 2019 | Utah | 5 | 0 | 27.4 | .467 | .348 | .750 | 4.6 | 1.6 | .4 | **.4** | 10.6 |
| 2020 | Utah | 7 | 7 | 35.5 | .406 | .455 | .500 | 5.4 | 2.7 | **1.3** | .3 | 5.6 |
| 2021 | Utah | **11** | **11** | **36.7** | .506 | .467 | .833 | **7.3** | 2.1 | 1.1 | .3 | **11.3** |
| 2022 | Utah | 6 | 6 | 31.4 | .400 | .280 | **1.000** | 5.7 | 1.5 | .5 | .2 | 6.2 |
| 2023 | Brooklyn | 4 | 0 | 29.5 | .241 | .182 | **1.000** | 4.3 | **3.5** | **1.3** | .3 | 5.0 |
| 2024 | Phoenix | 4 | 2 | 26.0 | .318 | .333 | — | 4.8 | 1.0 | .3 | .0 | 5.0 |
| 2026 | Phoenix | 4 | 0 | 24.3 | **.643** | **.615** | .833 | 6.3 | 2.3 | .5 | .3 | 7.8 |
| Career | | 52 | 31 | 29.9 | .447 | .384 | .725 | 5.3 | 1.9 | .8 | .3 | 7.7 |

== Personal life ==
Since 2024, O'Neale has been in a relationship with Paige Hurd and they got engaged on February 13, 2025 at Viceroy Riviera Maya in Cabo San Lucas, Mexico. On July 18, 2026, O'Neale and Hurd got married at the Oheka Castle in Huntington, New York.
