= Darius Bazley =

American basketball player (born 2000)

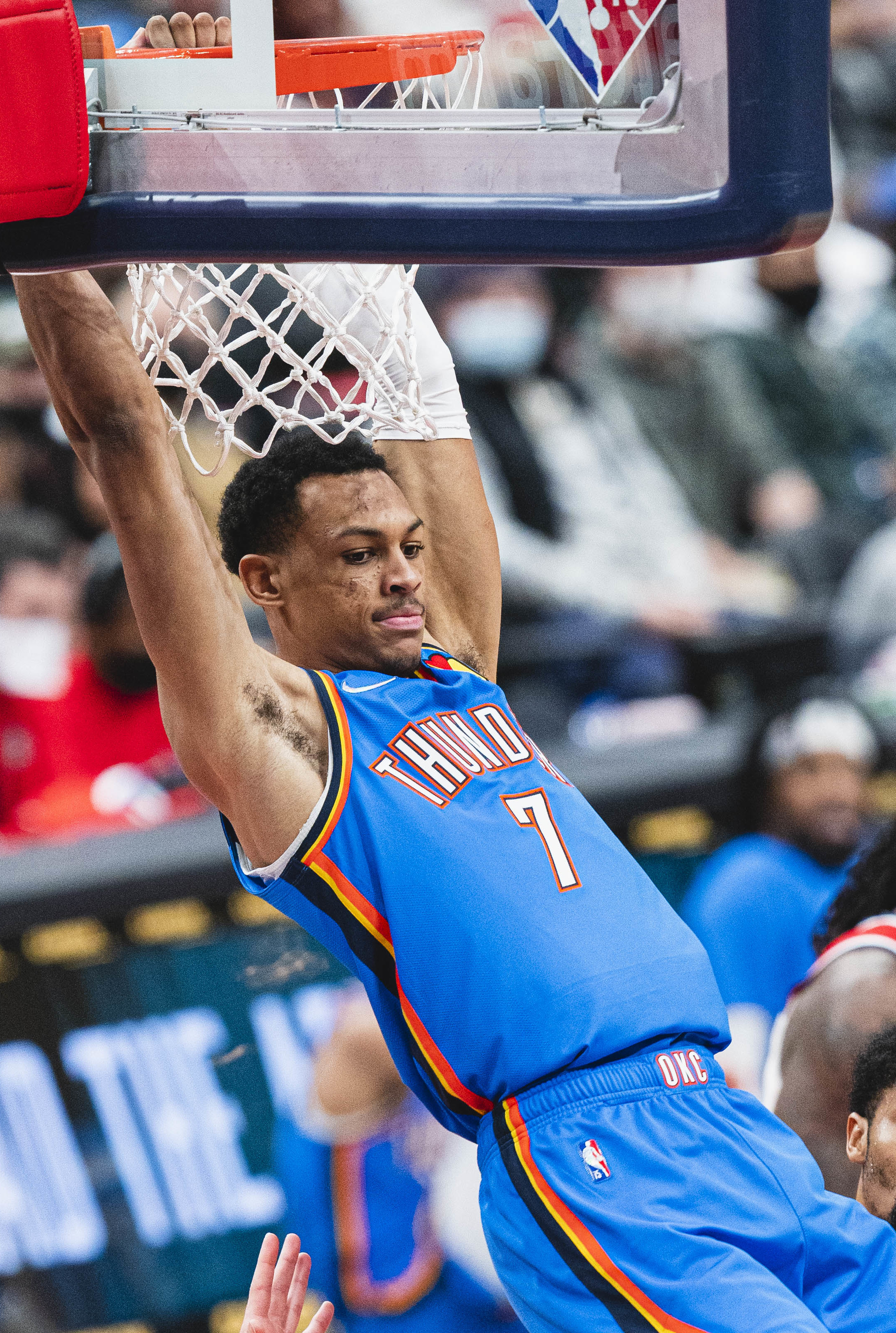
- Bazley with the Oklahoma City Thunder in 2022

No. 0 – Ulsan Hyundai Mobis Phoebus
- Position: Power forward
- League: KBL

Personal information
- Born: June 12, 2000 (age 26) Brockton, Massachusetts, U.S.
- Listed height: 6 ft 9 in (2.06 m)
- Listed weight: 216 lb (98 kg)

Career information
- High school: Finneytown (Springfield Township, Ohio); Princeton (Sharonville, Ohio)
- NBA draft: 2019: 1st round, 23rd overall pick
- Drafted by: Utah Jazz
- Playing career: 2019–present

Career history
- 2019–2023: Oklahoma City Thunder
- 2023: Phoenix Suns
- 2023–2024: Delaware Blue Coats
- 2024: Philadelphia 76ers
- 2024: Utah Jazz
- 2024: →Salt Lake City Stars
- 2024: Guangdong Southern Tigers
- 2024: Delaware Blue Coats
- 2024: Guangdong Southern Tigers
- 2026: Ningbo Rockets
- 2026: Leones de Ponce
- 2026–present: Ulsan Hyundai Mobis Phoebus

Career highlights
- All-NBA G League Second Team (2024); NBA G League All-Defensive Team (2024); NBA G League Next Up Game (2024); McDonald's All-American (2018)
- Stats at NBA.com
- Stats at Basketball Reference

Darius Denayr Bazley (born June 12, 2000) is an American professional basketball player for the Ulsan Hyundai Mobis Phoebus of the Korean Basketball League (KBL). He attended Princeton High School in Sharonville, Ohio after playing his first two years at Finneytown High School. He was a consensus five-star recruit and the top prospect in his state, earning McDonald's All-American honors in 2018.

Bazley initially committed to and signed with Syracuse but later chose to bypass college with intentions of joining the NBA G League, a decision that drew national attention. However, he instead chose to train independently as an intern for New Balance throughout the season leading up to the 2019 NBA draft. In the draft, he was selected 23rd overall by the Utah Jazz before immediately being traded to the Memphis Grizzlies and then to the Oklahoma City Thunder. Bazley spent four seasons with the Thunder before being traded to the Phoenix Suns in 2023.

== High school career ==
Bazley began playing high school basketball at Finneytown High School in Springfield Township, Ohio. He was ruled ineligible for the first half of his freshman season. As a sophomore, Bazley started drawing interest from several college programs, including Ohio State and West Virginia. On December 19, 2015, he posted 25 points, 15 rebounds, and 5 blocks against Woodward High School. After averaging 15.8 points, 12.4 rebounds, 3.8 assists, 2.4 blocks and 1.5 steals, he was named to the Division III Southwest Ohio all-district second team.

Entering his junior campaign, Bazley was the top-ranked player in Ohio. In July 2016, it was announced that he would transfer to Princeton High School in Sharonville, Ohio. He was sidelined for his first 11 games because of transfer rules. In August, Bazley committed to Ohio State, being rated a four-star recruit by 247Sports at the time. On January 11, 2017, he debuted for Princeton, recording 11 points, 10 rebounds, 5 assists, and 3 steals in a loss at the Flyin' To The Hoop Invitational. In April, Bazley announced his de-commitment from Ohio State due to his desire for a "bigger stage." About two months later, he committed to Syracuse, and in November, he signed a letter of intent. On January 16, 2018, in his senior season, Bazley was named to the West team for the 2018 McDonald's All-American Boys Game. On January 19, he led his Princeton team with 24 points in a nationally televised game against top recruit Romeo Langford and New Albany High School. Bazley also took part in the Jordan Brand Classic and Nike Hoop Summit in April.

College recruiting
Name	Hometown	School	Height	Weight	Commit date
Darius Bazley; SF	Cincinnati, OH	Princeton (OH)	6 ft 9 in (2.06 m)	200 lb (91 kg)	Jul 3, 2017
Darius Bazley; SF	Recruit ratings: Rivals: 247Sports: ESPN: (93)				
Overall recruit ranking: Rivals: 18 247Sports: 23 ESPN: 13
Note: In many cases, Scout, Rivals, 247Sports, On3, and ESPN may conflict in their listings of height and weight.; In these cases, the average was taken. ESPN grades are on a 100-point scale.; Sources: "Syracuse 2018 Basketball Commitments". Rivals.; "2018 Syracuse Orange Recruiting Class". ESPN.; "2018 Team Ranking". Rivals.

== Professional career ==
On March 30, 2018, Bazley announced that he would skip college with plans to join the NBA G League directly from high school. In April, he hired sports agent Rich Paul of Klutch Sports Group. Syracuse head coach Jim Boeheim, who Bazley was expected to play under in college before the move, responded, "I hope he does great. But I don't think it's the way it will be. I think it will be proven it's not the way to get to the NBA." On August 27, Bazley announced that he would drop his G League plans altogether, opting instead to train on his own for the season. On October 25, he began a three-month internship with New Balance worth $1 million. After concluding his internship, Bazley became one of the first players to enter the 2019 NBA draft, later being named one of 77 overall prospects invited to the 2019 NBA Draft Combine.

=== Oklahoma City Thunder (2019–2023) ===
Bazley was drafted 23rd overall by the Utah Jazz but was traded to the Memphis Grizzlies, who then traded him to the Oklahoma City Thunder. On November 15, 2019, Bazley made his NBA debut, recording five points in a 127–119 overtime win over the Philadelphia 76ers. On August 9, 2020, he scored a season-high 23 points, along with seven rebounds, in a 121–103 win over the Washington Wizards.

On April 19, 2021, Bazley logged a season-high 26 points, along with seven rebounds and three assists, in a 107–119 loss to the Washington Wizards. Two days later, he matched this total alongside nine rebounds in a 116–122 loss to the Indiana Pacers.

On March 13, 2022, Bazley recorded a career-high 29 points, along with ten rebounds, in a 118–125 loss to the Memphis Grizzlies. On March 28, he was ruled out for the remainder of the 2021–22 season with a tibial plateau fracture in his right knee.

=== Phoenix Suns (2023) ===
On February 9, 2023, Bazley was traded to the Phoenix Suns in exchange for Dario Šarić, a 2029 second-round pick and cash considerations.

On July 16, 2023, Bazley signed with the Brooklyn Nets, but was waived on October 19.

=== Philadelphia 76ers / Delaware Blue Coats (2023–2024) ===
On December 8, 2023, Bazley joined with the Delaware Blue Coats of the NBA G League and on February 20, 2024, he signed a 10-day contract with the Philadelphia 76ers. On March 1, he returned to Delaware.

=== Utah Jazz (2024) ===
On March 12, 2024, Bazley signed with the Utah Jazz. Bazley made six appearances for the Jazz, recording averages of 8.0 points, 4.5 rebounds, and 0.8 assists. However, he was waived on July 24.

=== Guangdong Southern Tigers (2024) ===
On September 6, 2024, Bazley signed with the Guangdong Southern Tigers of the Chinese Basketball Association.

=== Second Stint with Delaware (2024) ===
On November 15, 2024, Bazley returned to the Delaware Blue Coats. However, he was bought out on December 16.

On July 2, 2025, Bazley was announced as a member of the Los Angeles Lakers for the 2025 NBA Summer League. During a game against the Boston Celtics on July 17, Bazley suffered a serious lower leg injury and left the game in a wheelchair.

=== Ningbo Rockets (2026) ===
On March 7, 2026, Bazley signed with the Ningbo Rockets of the Chinese Basketball Association. On April 9, Bazley got into a shouting match with teammates after the opposing team stole an inbound pass intended for Zavier Simpson. He proceeded to throw the second inbound pass out of bounds, walked off the court to confront the coaching staff and teammates on the bench. After Bazley pushed a teammate, he was removed from the game and was cut later that day by the Rockets.

== Career statistics ==
Legend
GP	Games played	GS	Games started	MPG	Minutes per game
FG%	Field goal percentage	3P%	3-point field goal percentage	FT%	Free throw percentage
RPG	Rebounds per game	APG	Assists per game	SPG	Steals per game
BPG	Blocks per game	PPG	Points per game	**Bold**	Career high

=== NBA ===
==== Regular season ====
Year	Team	GP	GS	MPG	FG%	3P%	FT%	RPG	APG	SPG	BPG	PPG
2019–20	Oklahoma City	61	9	18.5	.394	.348	.694	4.0	.7	.4	.7	5.6
2020–21	Oklahoma City	55	**55**	**31.2**	.396	.290	.702	**7.2**	**1.8**	.5	.5	**13.7**
2021–22	Oklahoma City	**69**	53	27.9	.422	.297	.688	6.3	1.4	.8	1.0	10.8
2022–23	Oklahoma City	36	1	15.4	.449	**.400**	.554	3.4	.9	.5	.8	5.4
2022–23	Phoenix	7	0	8.7	.480	.250	.400	2.3	.9	.4	.7	4.0
2023–24	Philadelphia	3	0	3.3	.000	—	—	.3	.7	.0	.0	.0
2023–24	Utah	6	0	23.7	**.621**	.250	**.833**	4.5	.8	**1.0**	**1.2**	8.0
Career		237	118	23.4	.414	.309	.677	5.2	1.2	.6	.7	8.9

==== Playoffs ====
Year	Team	GP	GS	MPG	FG%	3P%	FT%	RPG	APG	SPG	BPG	PPG
2020	Oklahoma City	7	0	18.0	.419	.500	.900	6.7	.9	.0	.4	6.6
Career		7	0	18.0	.419	.500	.900	6.7	.9	.0	.4	6.6
