= William Flynn Martin =

American energy economist and diplomat (born 1950)

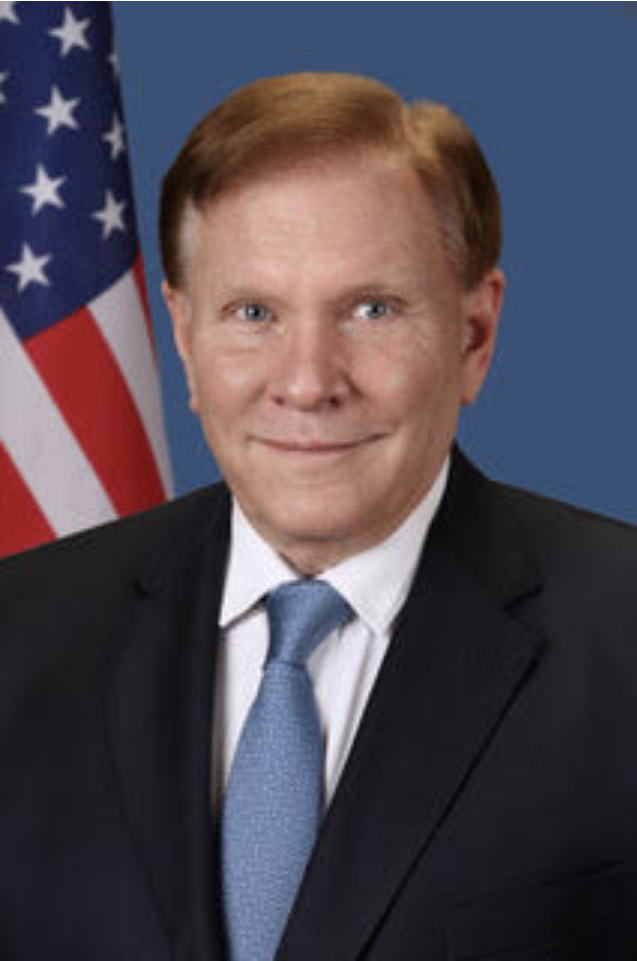

Special Assistant to the President for National Security Affairs
- In office 1983–1985
- President: Ronald Reagan

Executive Secretary of the United States National Security Council
- In office 1985–1986
- President: Ronald Reagan

United States Deputy Secretary of Energy
- In office 1986–1988
- President: Ronald Reagan
- Preceded by: Danny Julian Boggs
- Succeeded by: Joseph F. Salgado

Executive Director Republican Platform Committee
- In office 1992–1993
- President: George H. W. Bush

Chairman of the United States Nuclear Energy Advisory Committee
- In office 2002–2012
- President: George W. Bush

President of the Council of the United Nations University for Peace
- In office 2003–2008
- Secretary-General: Kofi Annan (UN)

Personal details
- Born: October 4, 1950 (age 76) Tulsa, Oklahoma, U.S.
- Party: Republican
- Education: University of Pennsylvania (BS); Massachusetts Institute of Technology (MS)

William Flynn Martin (born October 4, 1950) is an American energy economist, educator, and international diplomat. Martin served as Special Assistant to Ronald Reagan for National Security Affairs, Executive Secretary of the United States National Security Council, and United States Deputy Secretary of Energy during the Ronald Reagan Administration. He was President of the Council of the University for Peace, appointed to the Council by Secretary General of the United Nations Kofi Annan. In 1992, he was Executive Director of the Republican Platform committee under George H. W. Bush. William Martin served for ten years (from 2000 to 2010) as Chairman of the Nuclear Energy Advisory Committee during the administrations of George W. Bush and Barack Obama.

Martin was born in Tulsa, Oklahoma. He achieved his Bachelor of Science from the Wharton School of the University of Pennsylvania in 1972 and his Master of Science from MIT in 1974. His master's thesis was the basis of an article he co-authored with George Cabot Lodge in the March, 1975 Harvard Business Review entitled Our Society in 1985: Business May Not Like It.

William Martin is the recipient of seven letters of merit from Ronald Reagan, received the Order of the Rising Sun in person from Emperor Akihito of Japan, and was commended by Czech President Vaclav Havel for significant contributions to the Czech Republic.In 2023 he received the Distinguished Contribution to Diplomacy Medal of the Czech Republic. Martin received the highest honor of the Department of Energy for contributions in the fields of energy security and science and technology including fathering both the human genome project (1986) and international thermonuclear experimental reactor - ITER (1985). Secretary of Energy Dan Brouillette honored Martin’s contributions thirty five year service to the Department of Energy in 2019.

Martin’s perspectives on President Reagan are summarized in a book Reflections on President Reagan and an oral history video. His lifelong experiences with Japan are included in US-Japan Relations and Energy Security (1970-2100). William F. Martin’s publications have appeared in the Harvard Business Review, Harvard International Review, MIT Technology Review, and the Wall Street Journal. He has authored several books on energy, environment, and national security through MIT Press (two books), McGraw-Hill, Trilateral Commission, United States Department of Energy, and the International Energy Agency. His books have been published in Japanese, German, and French.

William F. Martin’s official White House government National Security Council files are available in the Ronald Reagan Library archive

== Education and early career ==
William Martin received his BS in economics from the Wharton School of the University of Pennsylvania, graduating in 1972. He immediately entered MIT for a Master’s degree. His MIT advisor was Professor Carroll L. Wilson, the first general manager of the Atomic Energy Commission. Martin had private studies with two Nobel Prize winners in Economics: Professor Paul Samuelson and Professor Robert Solow. The focus with Professor Solow was in the economics of externalities — to study how non economic factors such as environmental degradation should be accounted in free market economic systems. His thesis advisors were MIT Professor Carroll L. Wilson and Professor George Cabot Lodge of Harvard.

As a graduate student at MIT, he was part of a team that prepared ten days of Congressional hearings chaired by Congressman John Dingell on Growth and Its Implications for the Future (Roundtable Press, 1973). The hearings were in response to the Club of Rome's report, The Limits to Growth and were aimed at providing the first Congressional hearings on the world economic, energy and environmental outlook and the need for sustainable growth strategies. He was also part of an MIT engineering group that produced a volume for the United Nations Environmental Program on resource materials for studies in environmental management. He is co-author of the report, Professional Materials for Environmental Management Education (MIT Press, 1975). These publications were induced by the first United Nations conference on the environment held in Stockholm in 1972 and headed by Maurice Strong who said of Growth and Its Implications for the Future, "This small volume summarizes much of the important work going on today with regard to global survival...I know of no other publication to date which emphasizes more systematically or extensively, and in such readable form, the interacting relationships amongst diverse fields."

Following graduating from MIT, Martin joined the MIT Energy Laboratory as a Program officer for the Workshop on Alternative Energy Strategies (WAES) headed by Professor Carroll L. Wilson, the first General Manager of the US Atomic Energy Commission. This fifteen country energy assessment group, headquartered at MIT, met for three years and produced the report, Energy: Global Energy Prospects 1985-2000 (McGraw-Hill, 1975). Martin was a co-author of the final report and editor of Energy Supply to the Year 2000 (MIT Press, 1977). Martin was responsible for energy supply analysis as well as energy projections of developing nations. He and his co-author Frank J.P. Pinto were responsible for using the SIMLINK model of the World Bank as an economic foundation for projecting energy futures for developing nations. This World Bank-MIT project entitled Energy and Economic Growth Prospects for the Developing Countries: 1960-2000 (MIT Press, 1977). was one of the pioneering research attempts to estimate energy prospects for developing countries.

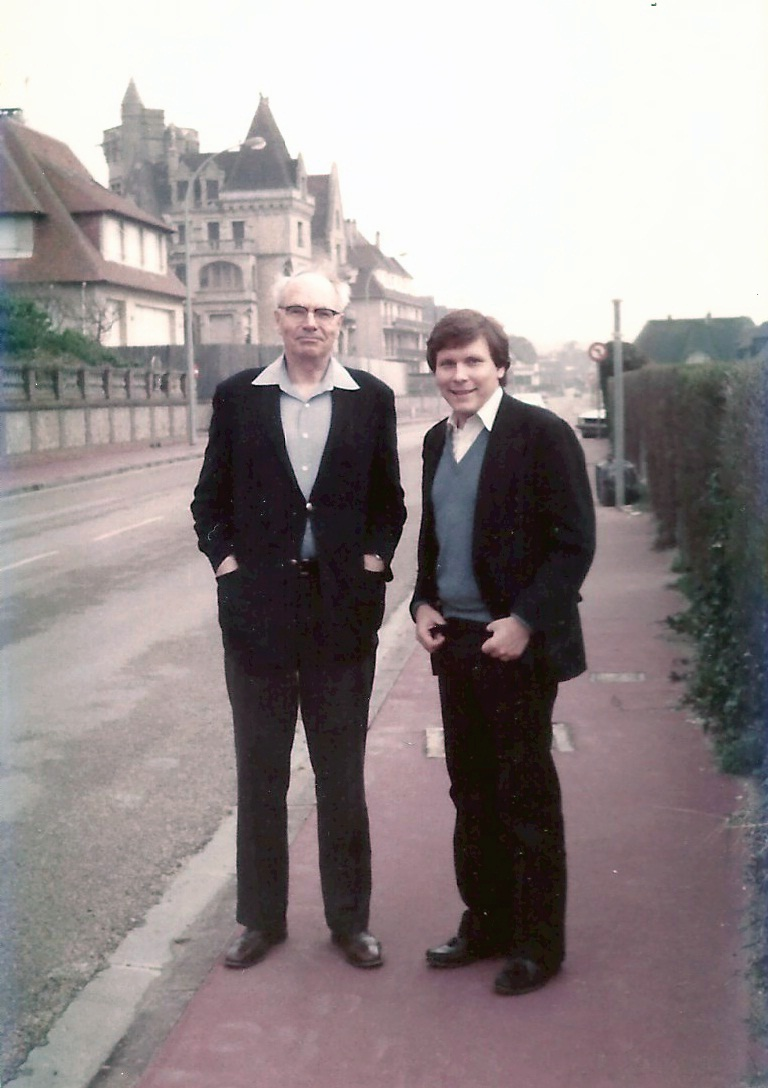
Martin with Carroll L. Wilson, Normandy, 1976

Martin then moved to Paris where he was responsible for energy statistics for developing countries at the International Energy Agency Organisation for Economic Co-operation and Development and was part of a UN expert group that developed the methodology for reporting United Nations energy statistics. The statistics were published in the volumes I and II of the report Workshop on Energy Data of Developing Countries (IEA/OECD, 1978). Martin was also director of the IEA Workshop on Energy Statistics for Developing Countries that resulted in the first publication of energy statistics for over 100 countries in a matrix supply/demand integration format.

In 1978, he was promoted to Special Assistant to the Executive Director of the IEA, Ulf Lantzke, and served in this capacity for two years during the time of the Second Oil Shock. At the commencement of the Iran-Iraq war, it was agreed that nations should coordinate their oil stock draws in the event of a major disruption. As the Special Assistant to the IEA Executive Director, Martin served as the coordinator for four IEA Ministerial meetings where he aided in the drafting of several communiques, including the one from 1981 that is the basis of IEA agreements today on coordinated stock draw as well as a key element of the 2009 discussions between Henry Kissinger (the founder of IEA), Nobuo Tanaka (then Executive Director) and Martin on expanding this concept to include China, India and other advancing nations. A letter from Kissinger to Martin recognizing his contribution in this regard can be seen online.

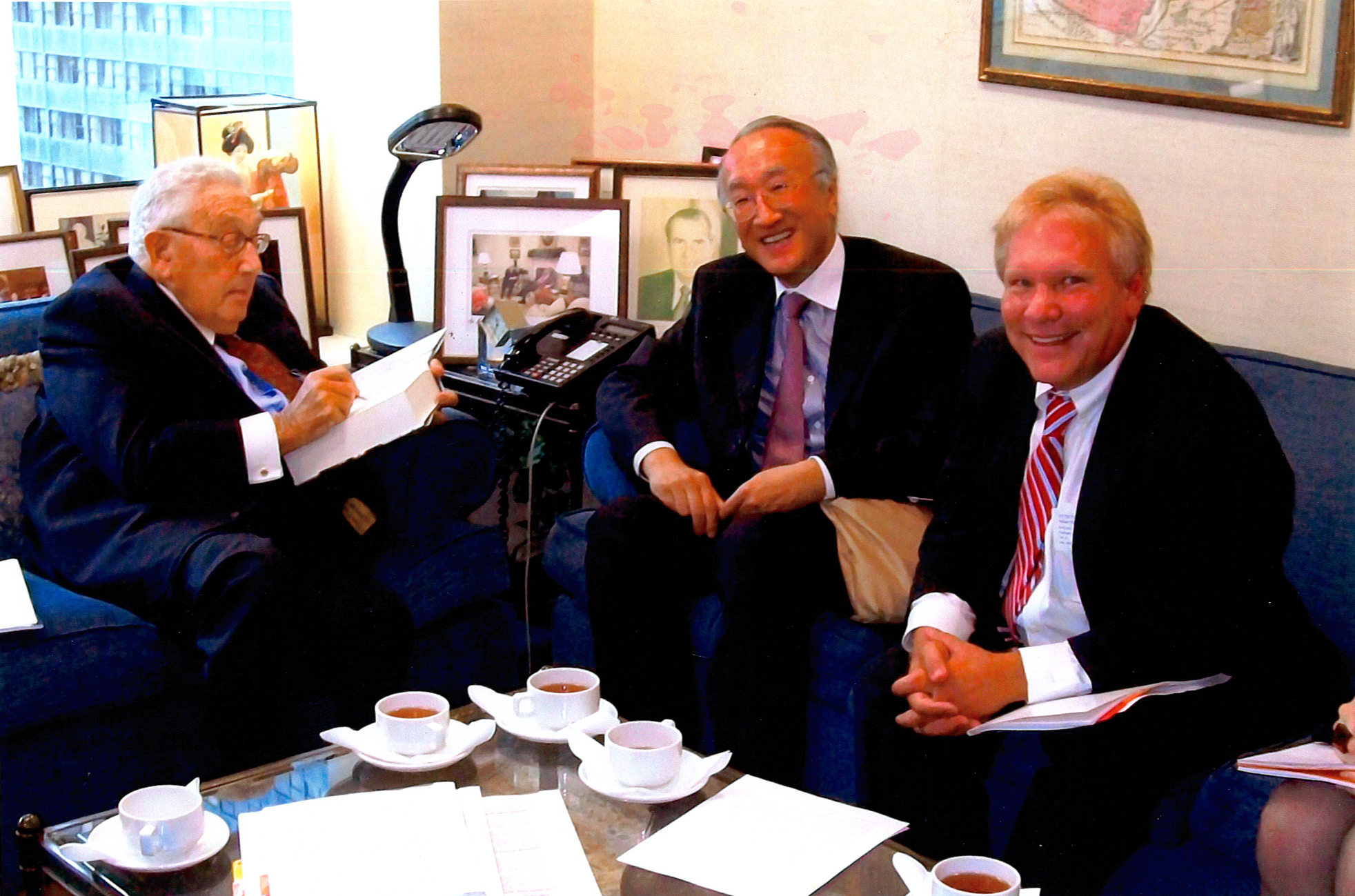
William Martin, Nobuo Tanaka and Henry Kissinger

== Reagan administration ==
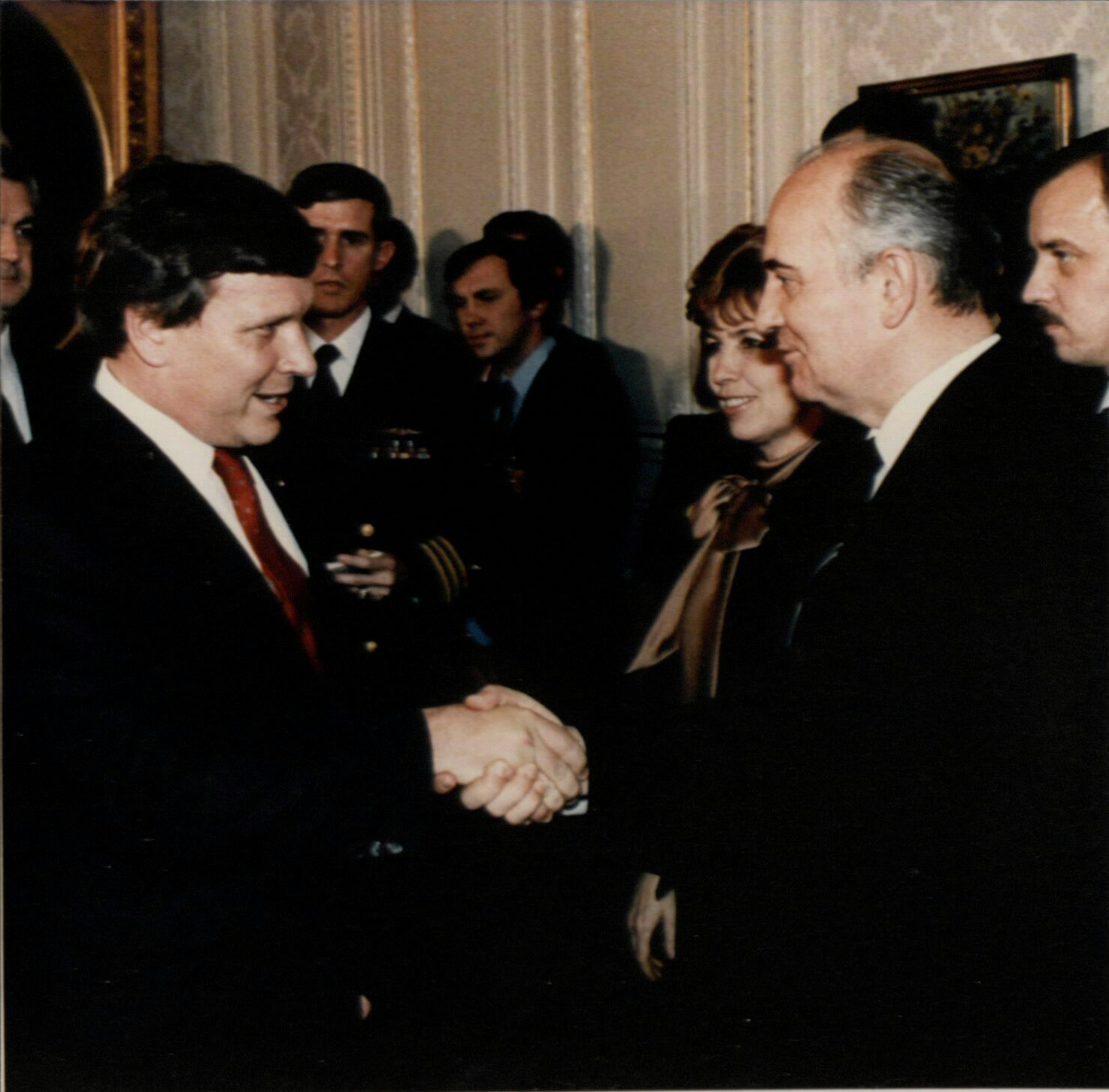
Martin and Gorbachev

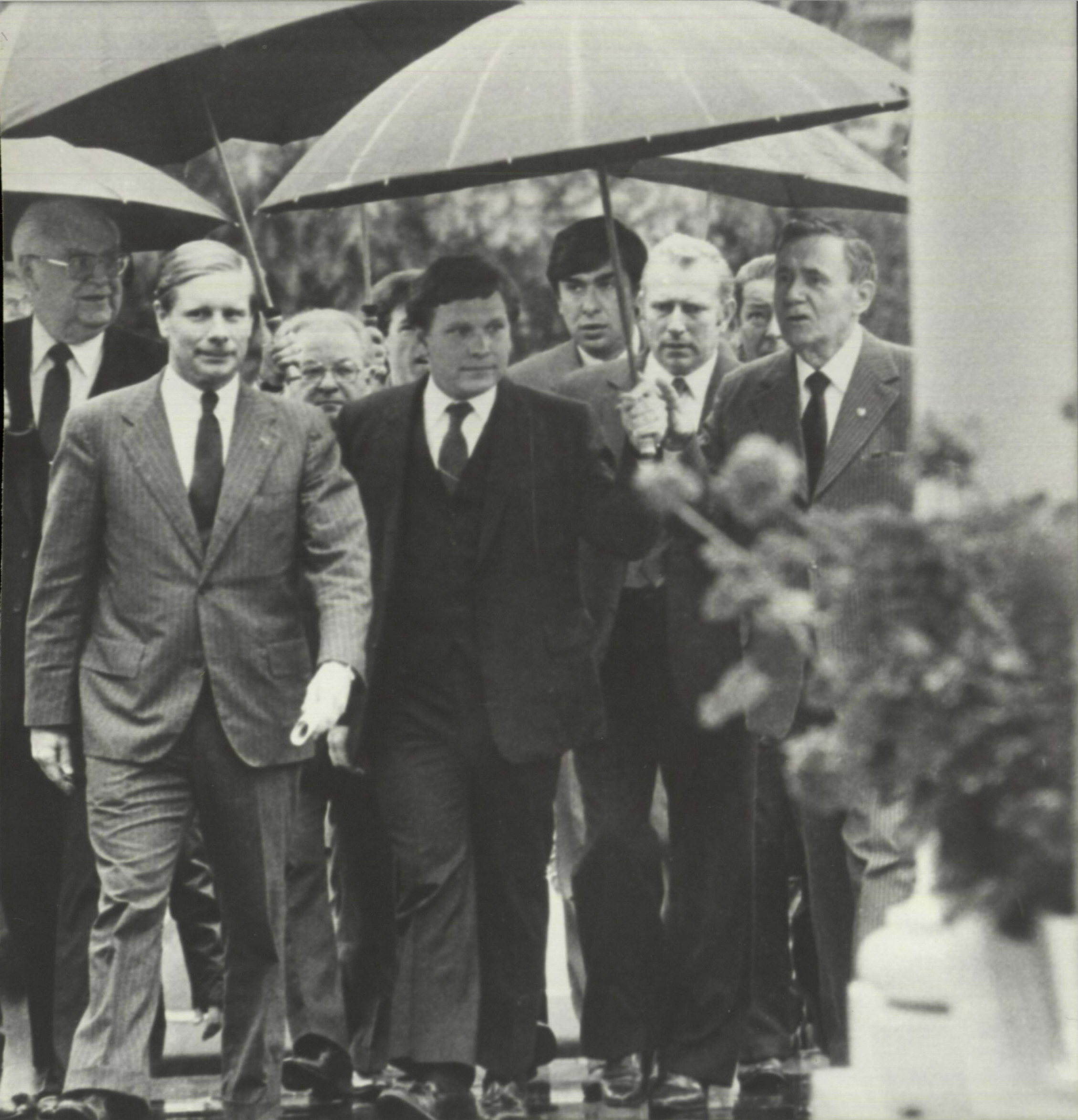
Martin escorting Soviet Foreign Minister Gromyko to meeting with Ronald Reagan

In 1981, Martin joined the United States Department of State as Special Assistant to Under Secretary of State James L. Buckley who recalled Martin's activities in his book Gleanings from an Unplanned Life. The senior Reagan administration inter-agency "Buckley Group" that Martin coordinated sought to reduce European subsidies and credits to the Soviet Union. It also urged Europeans to reduce their dependence on Soviet gas and to find alternatives. Finally, it proposed market oriented energy policies for the United States (deregulation of oil and gas price controls, permitting Alaskan oil exports, allowing eminent domain for coal slurry pipelines) -- all policies of which eventually came to fruition during the Reagan Presidency. (see reference to this again in James Buckley's Gleanings from an Unplanned Life). Martin briefed President Reagan in the Oval Office that unless the US was credible in its energy policies, the Europeans would not take seriously our concerns on their over dependence on Soviet gas imports.

In 1982, he was transferred to the National Security Council as the Director of International Economic Affairs. In this capacity he prepared recommendations for the President in the areas of energy security, East-West economic relations, the Iran-Iraq War and Central American economic development. A key responsibility of Martin's was to conceptualize and then negotiate with the Europeans on the issue of reducing their reliance on Soviet natural gas imports, a project that was directed personally by President Reagan. Martin made a key presentation to President Reagan on alternative gas scenarios for Europe, concluding that the Troll field was vital for European security. Martin's role was to negotiate the development of the giant Norwegian Troll gas field to be an alternative to Soviet gas imports and this was documented in the book Troll: Gas for Generations, an excerpt of which can be seen online. This was part of a larger program to undermine the Soviet economy as reported by Peter Schweizer in his book, Victory: The Reagan Administration's Secret Strategy that Hastened the Collapse of the Soviet Union and the excerpt where he credited Martin for this effort can be seen online.

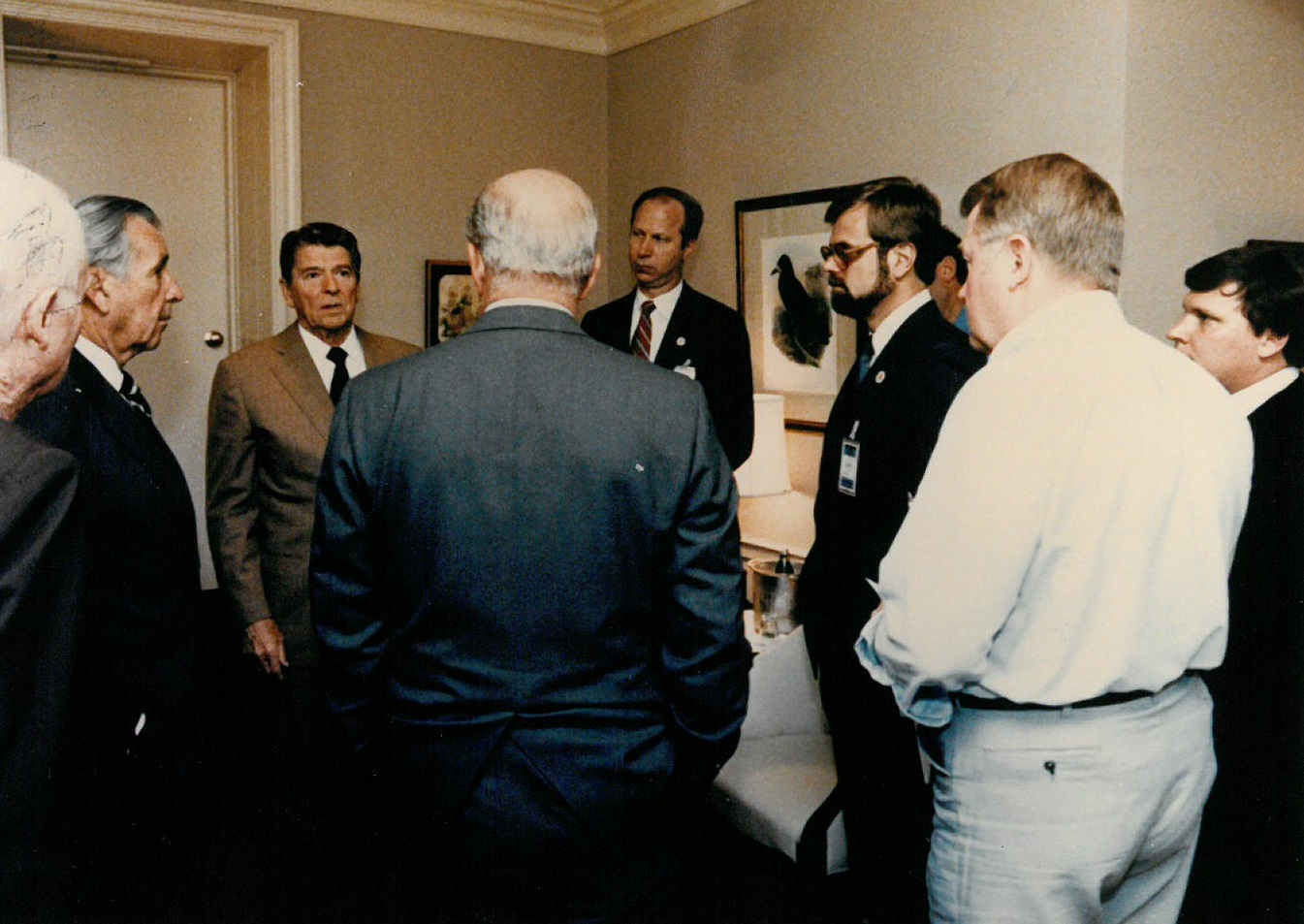
Martin with Reagan in Williamsburg

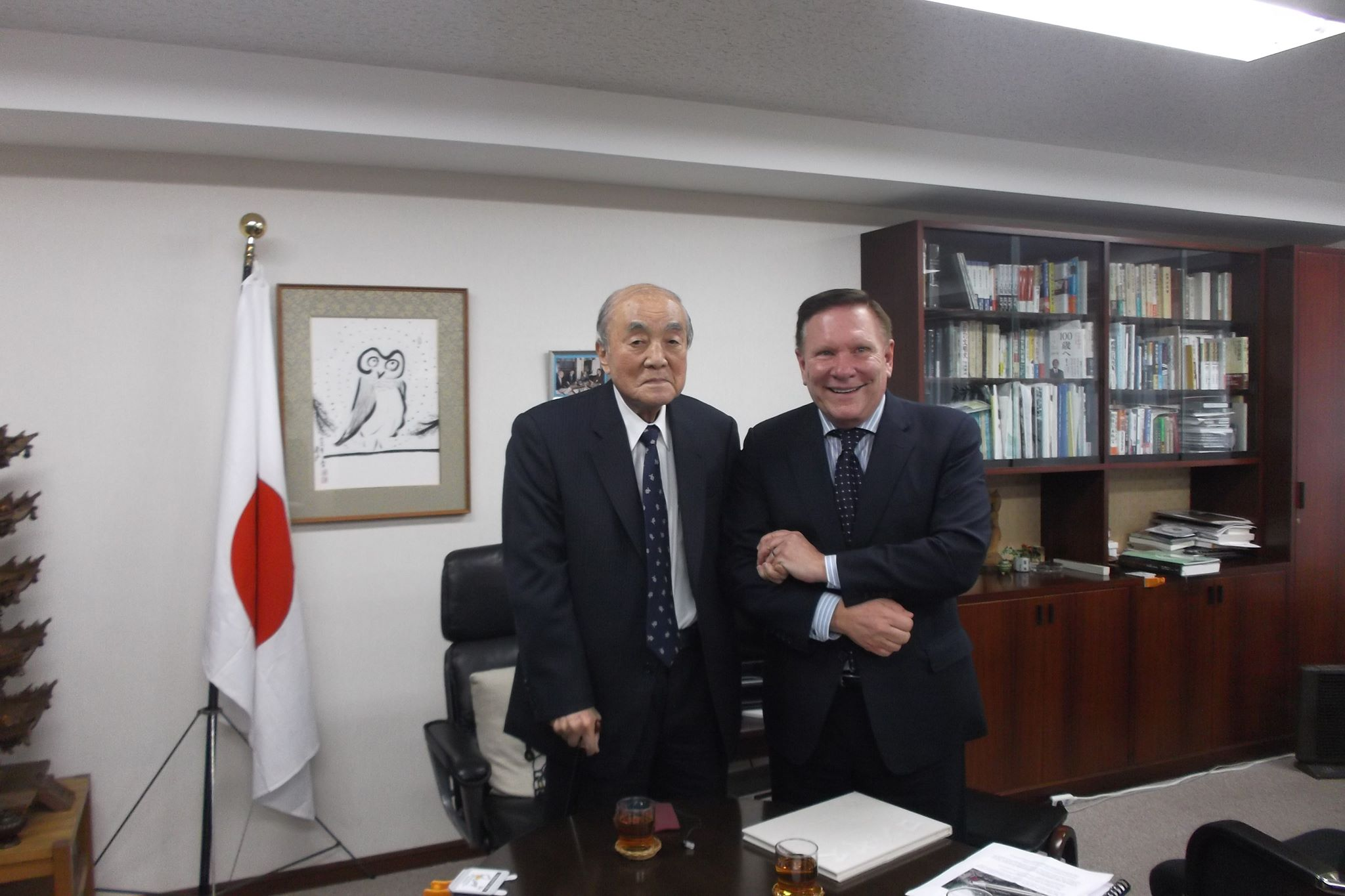
Martin and Prime Minister Nakasone

Martin is also credited in a Presidential citation as the principal draftsman of the Williamsburg Declaration, at the 9th G7 Summit which is a three-page communique agreed to by the G-7 leaders who were Prime Minister Margaret Thatcher of the UK, Prime Minister Yasuhiro Nakasone of Japan, Chancellor Helmut Kohl of West Germany, Prime Minister Pierre Trudeau of Canada, Prime Minister Amintore Fanfani of Italy and Prime Minister François Mitterrand of France. The President read the three-page declaration before the world press (President Reagan's opening remarks can be seen on online) and credited Martin as the principal draftsman in the following online letter. Many conclude that this jointly agreed document, which argued for free markets and free trade policies, set in place the foundations for a worldwide economic recovery beginning in 1983. Based on these achievements, Martin was appointed Special Assistant to President Reagan, responsible for the coordination of the President's international and head of state meetings.

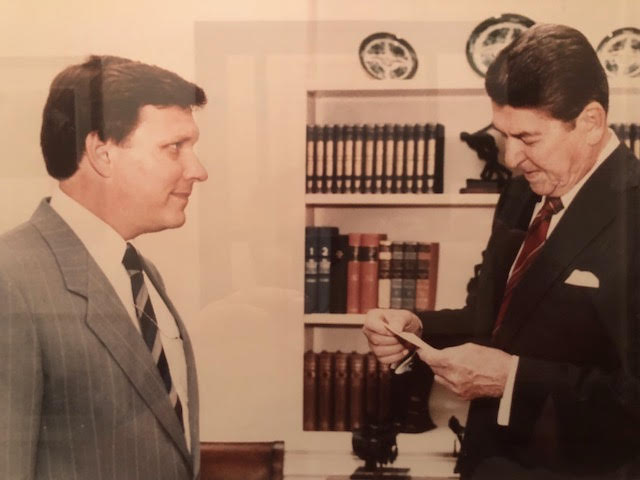
Reagan reading Martin cards prior to Oval Office meeting

Martin helped arrange President Reagan's international meetings coordinating with the White House Advance Office, NSC staff and the Department of State. He participated in the President's visits to Japan (1983), South Korea (1983), China (1984), Ireland (1984), United Kingdom (1984), the D-Day fortieth anniversary commemoration on Normandy beaches in France (1984), Canada (1985), Spain (1985), Germany (1985), EU Parliament (1985), the Reagan-Gorbachev Geneva Summit (1985) and several G-7 economic summit meetings (Williamsburg, London and Bonn). Working closely with the State Department and NSC staff, he also coordinated the preparation of President Reagan's Oval Office head of state meetings. As NSC Senior Director for Coordination, he coordinated and participated in the President's major bilateral meetings with, among others, Prime Minister Yasuhiro Nakasone of Japan, Shimon Peres of Israel, King Fahd of Saudi Arabia, Prime Minister Brian Mulroney of Canada, President Ali Saibou of Niger, King Hussein of Jordan, Prime Minister Margaret Thatcher of the UK, Prime Minister Bettino Craxi of Italy, Prime Minister Kåre Willoch of Norway, Prime Minister Prem Tinsulanond of Thailand, Prime Minister Ranasinghe Premadasa of Sri Lanka, Foreign Minister Andrei Gromyko of the USSR, OECD Secretary General Jean-Claude Paye, UN Secretary General Javier Pérez de Cuéllar and Chancellor Helmut Kohl of West Germany.

In addition to general preparations for the President's meeting with the Soviet Premier Mikhail Gorbachev, he and Dr. Alvin Trivelpiece were responsible for concluding an agreement with his Russian counterpart Academic Evgeny Velikhov on magnetic fusion cooperation that has since become the ITER (International Thermonuclear Experimental Reactor) project as recognized in the concluding sentence of the communique of this historic meeting, "The two leaders emphasized the potential importance of the work aimed at utilizing controlled thermonuclear fusion for peaceful purposes and, in this connection, advocated the widest practicable development of international cooperation in obtaining this source of energy, which is essentially inexhaustible, for the benefit for all mankind".

In preparation for major visits abroad and in the Oval office, as well as visits outside the United States, Martin would sometimes do the first draft of the President's weekly radio address in close coordination with Presidential chief speech writer Ben Elliott. Three of these addresses were especially important. First, Reagan's radio address in 1984 following his first meeting with a Soviet leader (Foreign Minister Gromyko) after four years in office. This widely quoted radio address, highlighted in headlines on the front page of the Washington Post set the agenda and tone for the subsequent meeting with Soviet leader Gorbachev one year later. Reagan recognized Martin's role in its drafting in the following letter. Second, Martin prepared a radio address describing the G-7 Economic Meeting chaired by Margaret Thatcher in 1984. And third, he prepared a radio address in 1983 describing the President's visit to Japan and Korea.

== National Security Council ==
Martin served as the Executive Secretary of the National Security Council in the Reagan White House. The Executive Secretary is the head of the NSC as defined by the National Security Act of 1947. In practice, it serves as the NSC's chief of staff responsible for coordination, budget and management of the National Security Council. The Executive Secretary coordinates the National Security Council meetings and manages vital policy and information communication from the Cabinet and the NSC staff to the President. One of the duties of Mr. Martin as Executive Secretary was to oversee the White House Situation Room located in the basement of the West Wing of the White House which is in 24/7 communication with the Department of Defense, State Department, Intelligence Community and US embassies abroad.

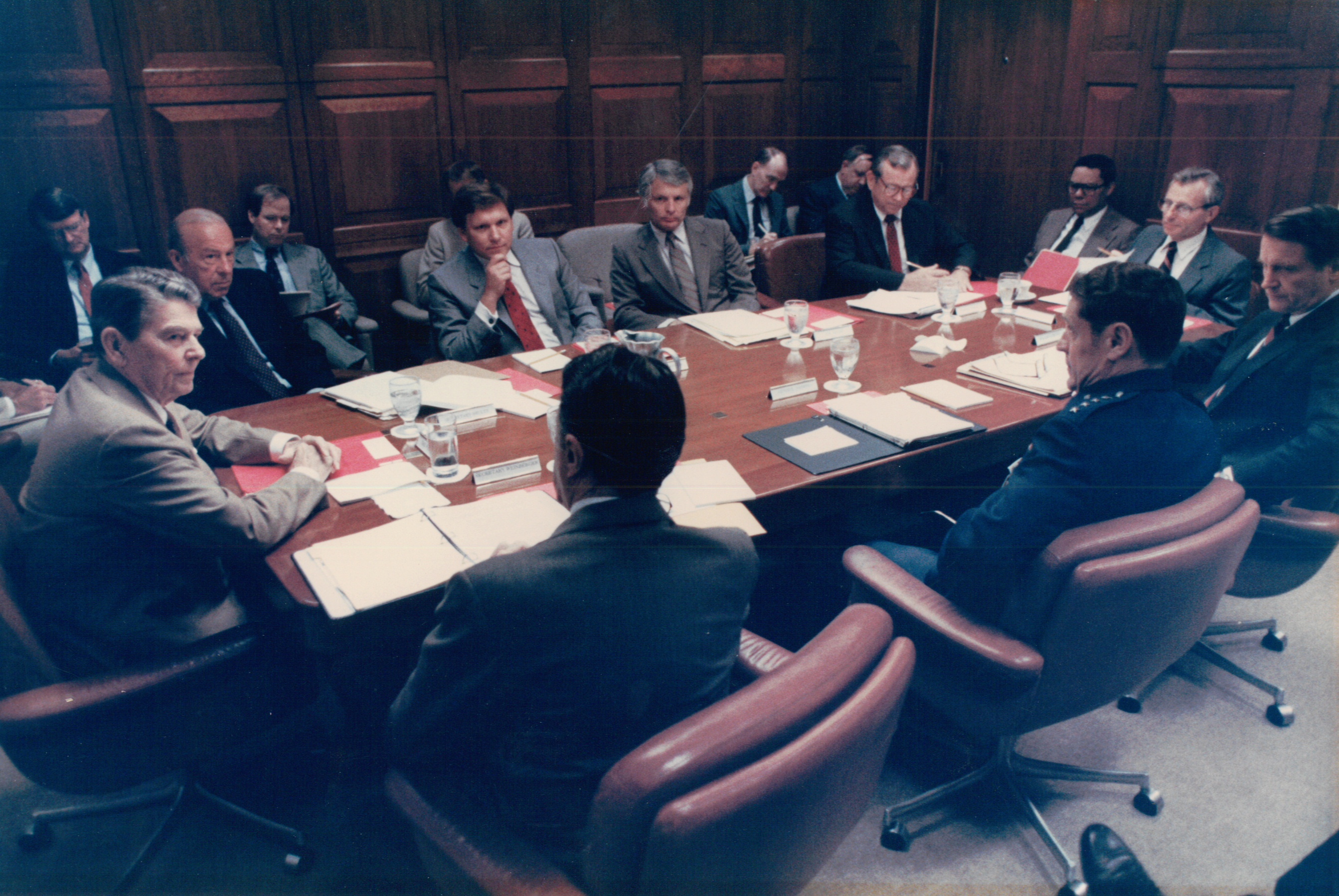
Martin in National Security Meeting

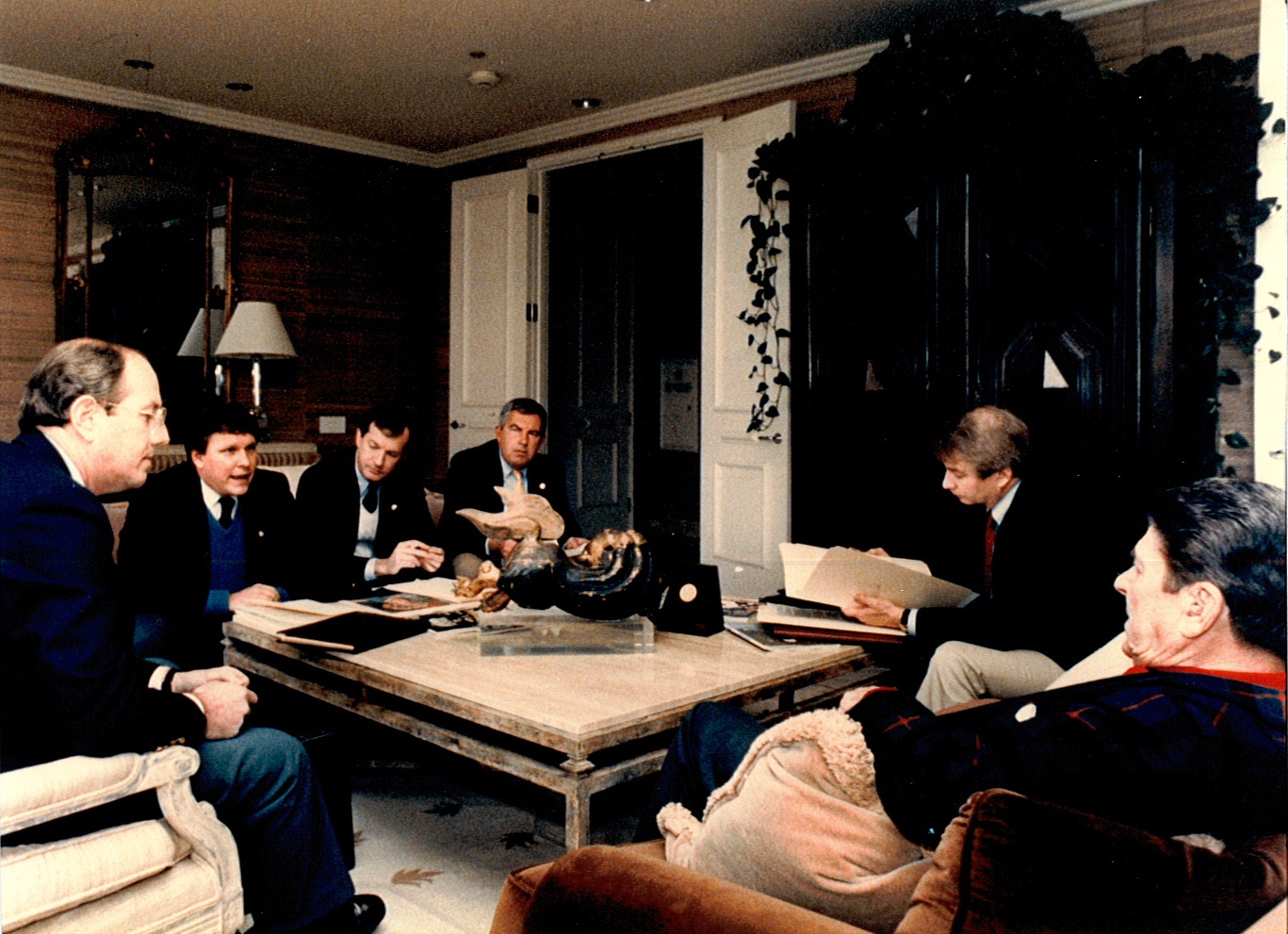
Martin briefs President Reagan on Abu Nidal

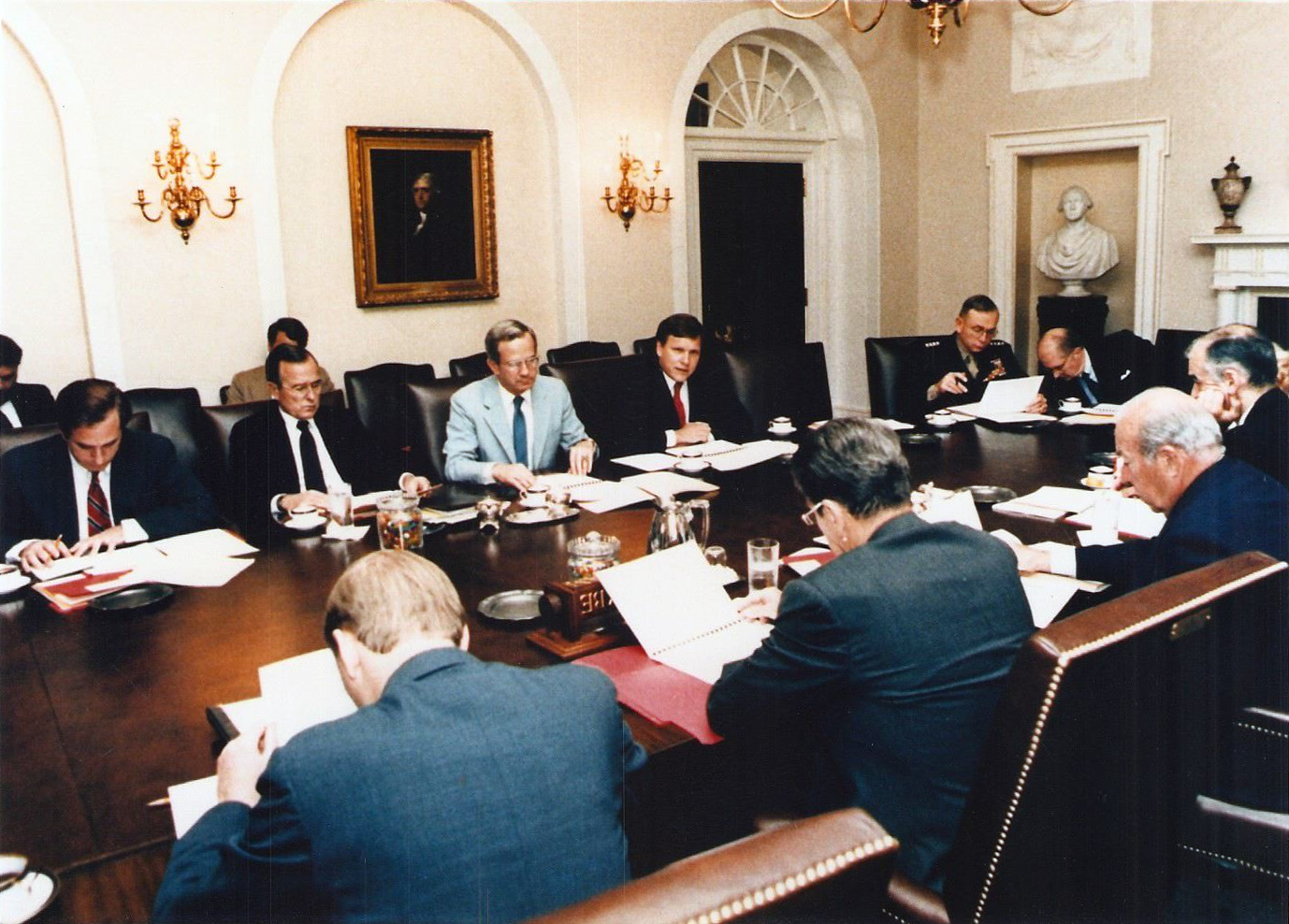
Martin Cabinet briefing on Central American economic development

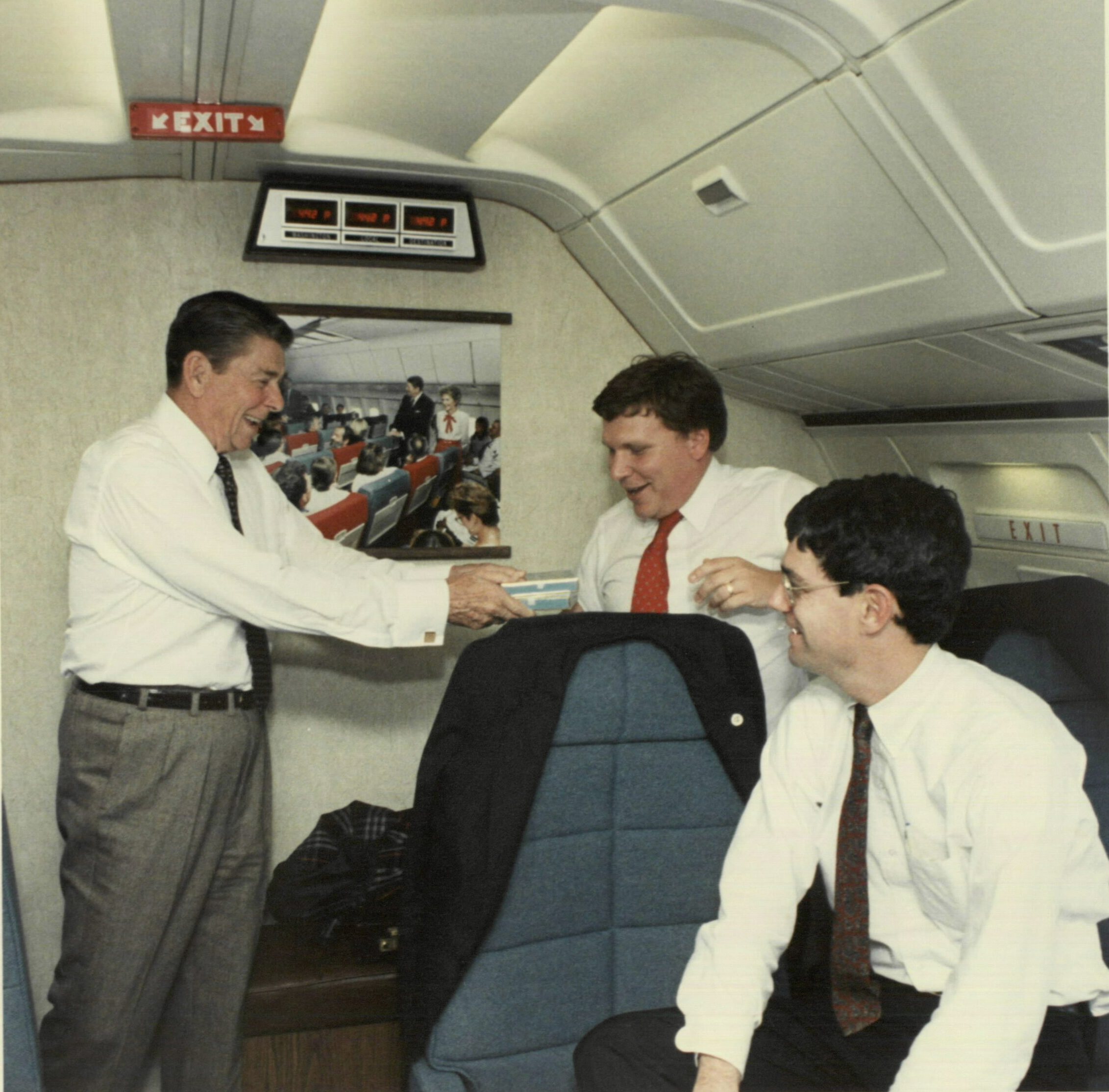
Martin 35th birthday celebration on Air Force One

As Executive Secretary, Martin also chaired an Executive Secretary group composed of officials from State, Defense, CIA and the NSC responsible for coordinating the President's national security priorities as identified in a book titled National Security Issues of the United States. Martin developed a system for briefing the President using a six-month national security intelligence, policy and implementation calendar working closely with his inter-agency colleagues Colin Powell and Robert Gates.

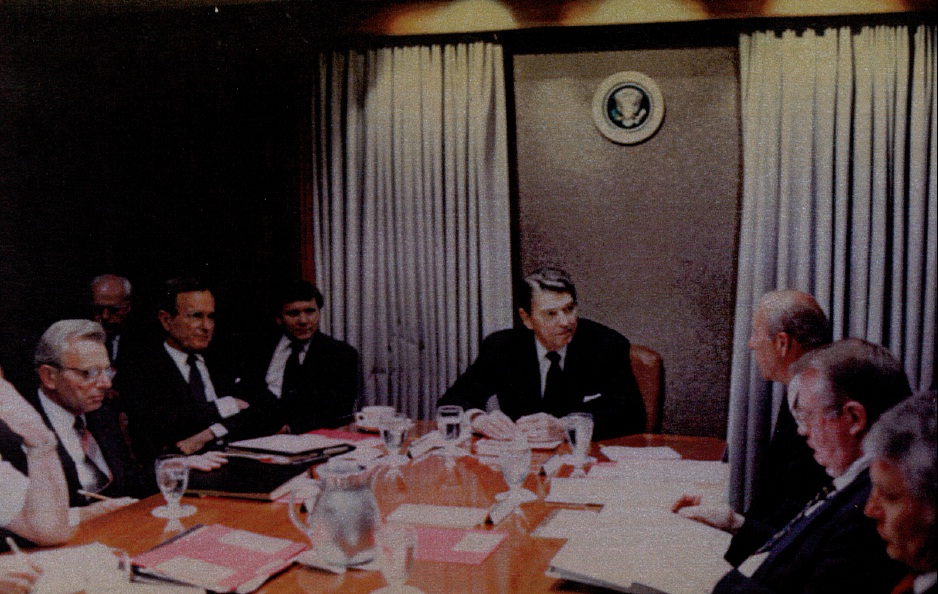
Between two Presidents in the Situation Room

Martin also initiated and coordinated the production of several videos prepared for the President describing Reagan's international visits, objectives and "scene-setters" including his visit to China in 1984, his visit to Europe to celebrate the fortieth anniversary of D-Day and a preview of the historic first meeting with Soviet leader Gorbachev in Geneva in 1985, a script of which can be seen online. These videos were presented to the President just before visits to supplement other written and oral presentations.

At the time of the Iran-Iraq war in 1984, Martin was responsible for the coordination of an NSC Special Situation Group headed by Vice-President Bush on building up the defensive capabilities of friendly Middle Eastern countries and developing a strategy to cope with potential oil market disruptions. Martin's briefing to the President was the culmination of several meetings of the NSC working group, documents of which can be found here: Memo on Internal Paper on Persian Gulf; Memo outlining talking points; Memo to McFarlane on working group; Memo to Clark updating the situation; and cables between President Reagan and British Prime Minister Thatcher on the subject. Martin's role was detailed by Robert C. McFarlane in his book Special Trust, an excerpt of which can be seen online. The plan, approved by the President and Vice President, was an important step in building US military capability in the Gulf resulting in the successful defense of Kuwait and Saudi Arabia in the 1991 Gulf War. The plan also stimulated the buildup of the US Strategic Petroleum Reserve. Martin's now declassified presentation to the President can be seen online

In 1985, Martin chaired an NSC inter-agency group on Central American Economic Development. The conclusion of the working group, presented to and approved by the President, was threefold: encourage free market reforms; contribute $8 billion in economic assistance; and encourage continued security in the region. The actual Reagan National Security Study Directive (NSSD) describing these initiatives can be viewed on reaganlibrary.gov. The policy also called upon all US Cabinet officers to assist Central America in its quest for economic development (i.e. agriculture, energy, commerce and transportation). The theme of the presentation was that security assistance in Central America would be enhanced through economic growth and prosperity. Without economic progress, the security situation would continue to unravel.

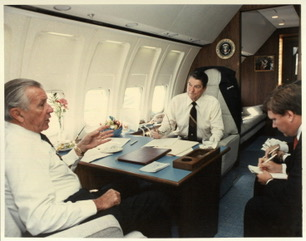
Martin advising Reagan on AF1.

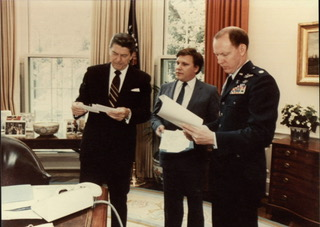
Consultation with Reagan on emergency preparedness

During the Christmas holiday season in 1985, Mr. Martin was traveling with President Reagan to California as the NSC aide. During this time, there was a terrorist attack on the Rome and Vienna airports, resulting in the deaths of many innocent men, women and children. Martin set up an NSC crisis management center on the site of the Annenberg Estate where the President was staying and kept the President updated with morning, noon and evening meetings. The terrorist was Abu Nidal and the New York Times reported that Martin was handling the terrorist attack for the President. It was learned that Abu Nidal had backing from Libya and a key question for the President was the appropriate response. The President responded that since the attacks were in Rome and Vienna, authorities in those countries should bring the criminals to justice. "This is not a time to spread violence in the region", the President told Martin and also told him to tell Israel not to attack Syrian missiles in the Beqaa Valley. Three months later when Americans were killed in the La Belle Discotheque bombing in Berlin, President Reagan responded with an attack on Gaddafi's compound codenamed Operation El Dorado Canyon.

William Martin was also involved in the conceptualization and implementation of the National Program Office. The National Program was established to ensure continuity of the United States government in the event of a nuclear attack. This deterrence system was later adapted following the 9/11 attacks to protect the US government in the event of a hostile terrorist attack.

== Department of Energy ==
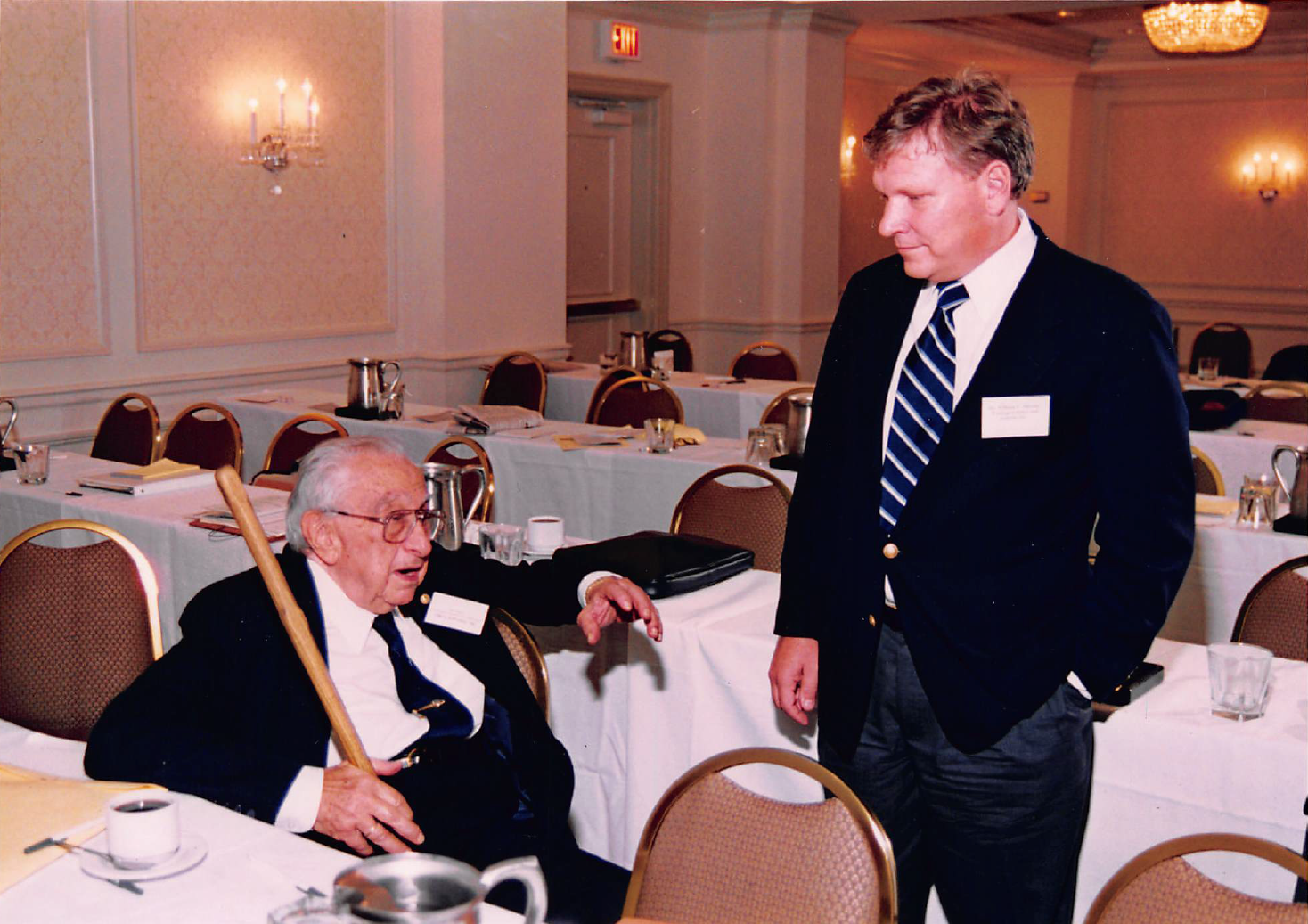
Martin with Ed Teller at DOE

In June 1986, Martin was nominated by President Reagan and confirmed by the United States Senate as United States Deputy Secretary of Energy, the number two official of the United States Department of Energy. Martin reported to Secretary of Energy John S. Herrington. The DOE is responsible for the nation's nuclear weapons complex, scientific research and energy policy. At the time of his confirmation, the department had over 150,000 employees and contractors. Martin was awarded the department's highest award by Energy Secretary John S. Herrington for a report he produced, Energy Security: Report to the President of the United States. It was the first comprehensive inter-agency, publicly available study on US energy security and concluded that energy imports would continue to rise and that US must strive for greater energy efficiency and development of clean coal technology, safe nuclear power, natural gas, solar and other renewable technologies, as well as to maintain incentives for environmentally sensitive domestic oil development. Martin testified before the United States Senate Energy and Natural Resources Committee on the study conclusions. His testimony can be seen online. For this, he was commended by the Democratic Chairman of the United States House Committee on Energy and Commerce, John Dingell. Martin was also the administration's top energy adviser on the Canada–United States Free Trade Agreement that opened up energy markets between the United States and Canada. He was commended for his work as a member of the negotiating team and core member of the Cabinet group that oversaw the negotiations with Canada. Martin's testimony on behalf of the agreement before the US House of Representatives Committee on Foreign Affairs, Subcommittee on International Economic Policy, Trade and Western Hemisphere Affairs can be seen online.

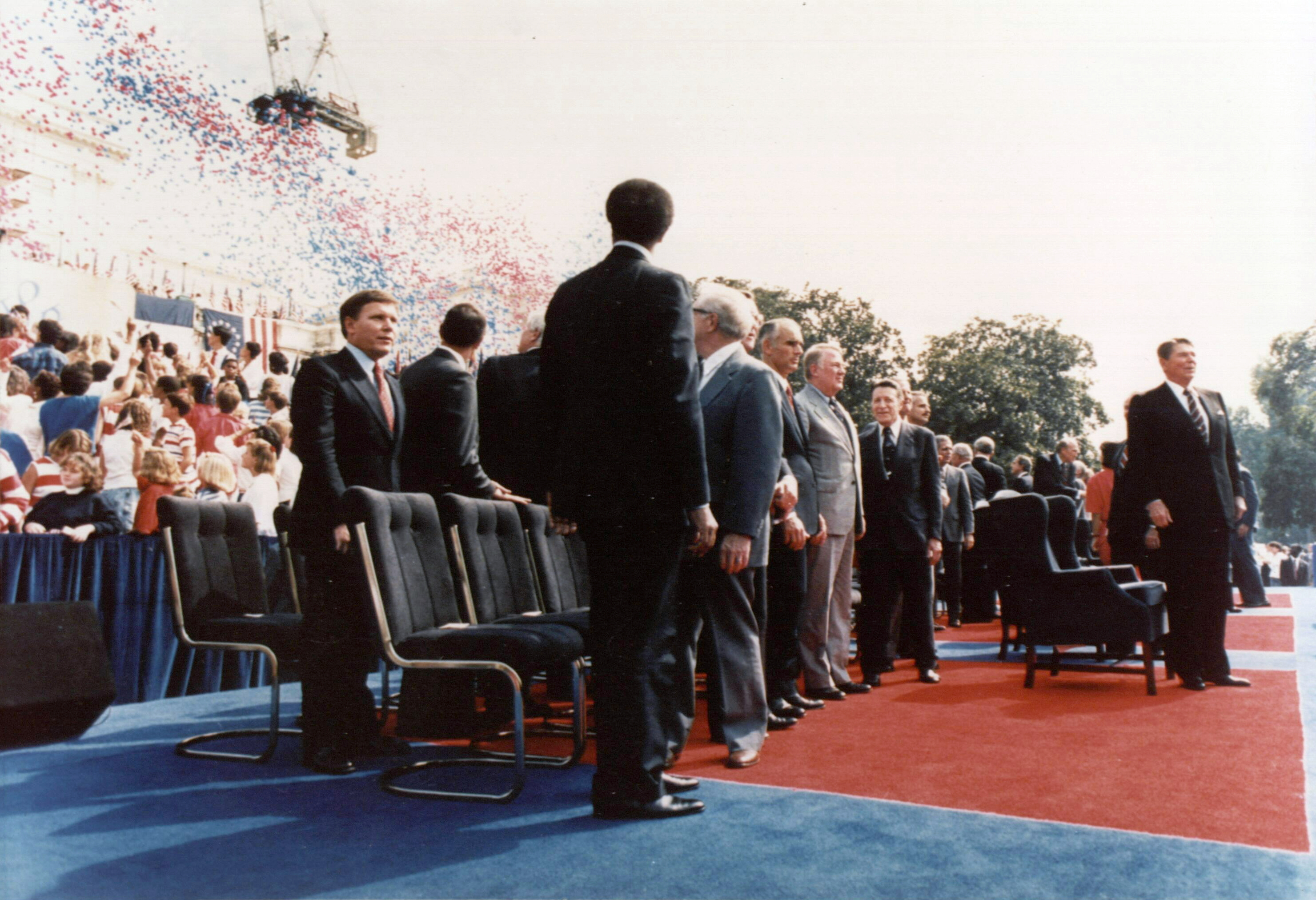
Acting Energy Secretary Martin at 200th anniversary celebration of US Constitution

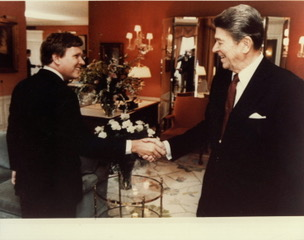
Preparing Ronald Reagan for United Nations meetings

In 1986, Martin engaged then-Governor and future President Bill Clinton in a debate before the United States Senate Committee on Energy and Natural Resources on the merits of the Federal Energy Regulatory Commission's powers to set interstate electricity rates. The Senate Committee supported Martin's view, objected to by Clinton, that an electricity holding company, Grand Gulf, could justifiably raise electricity prices in the state of Arkansas due to cost overruns of the Grand Gulf Nuclear Generating Station operating in Mississippi. Though Arkansas received no power from Grand Gulf because of their interstate jurisdictions under US federal law, this debate was significant in that it established firm guidelines for the US electricity industry during a period of deregulation and concern over "rate shock."

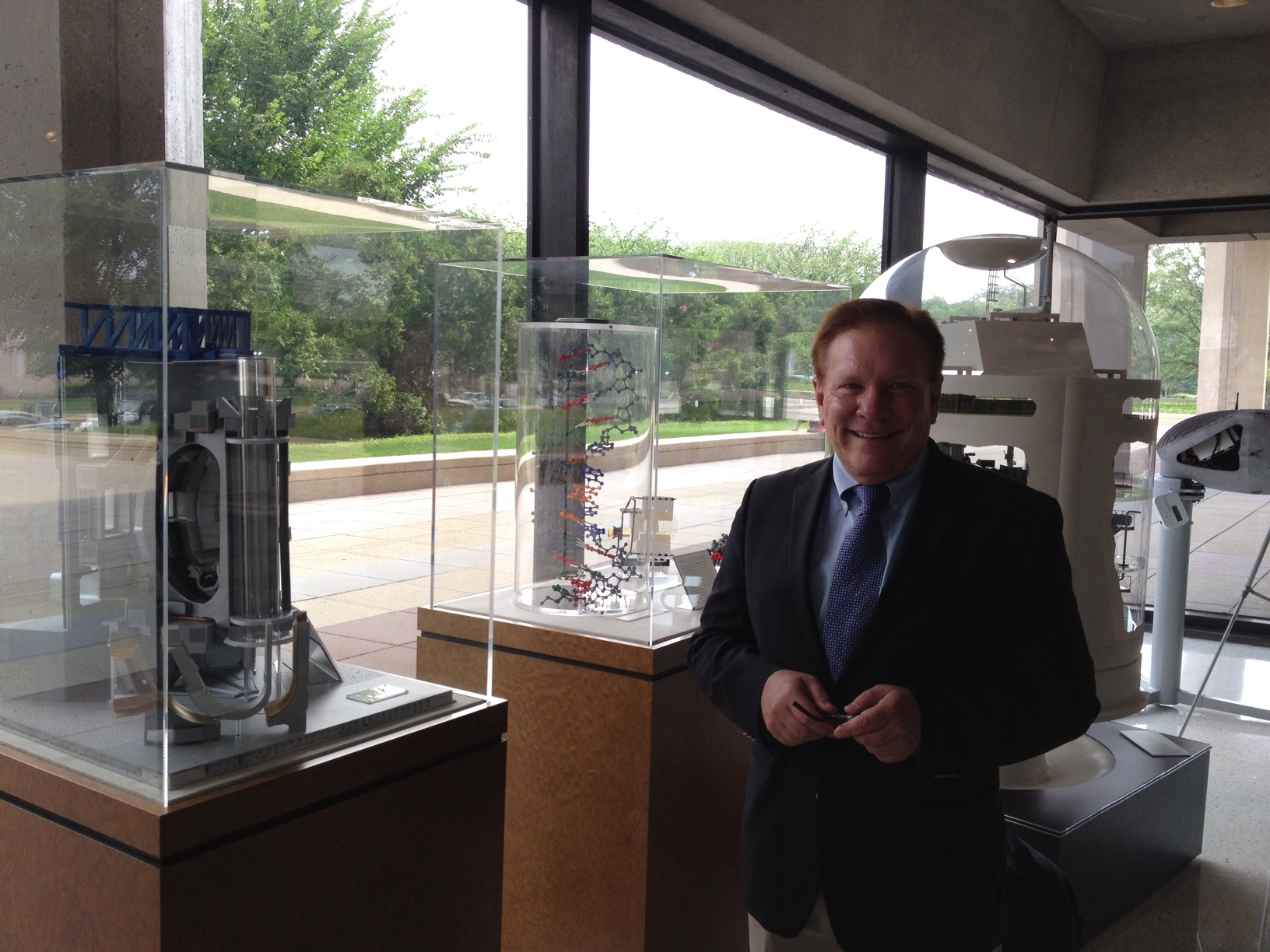
Martin with Human Genome and ITER displays at US DOE HQ

During Martin's tenure at the DOE, he was presented with and approved a proposal by Dr. Alvin Trivelpiece to map the Human Genome. The Human Genome Project was the crown jewel of 20th century biology. This chart (available online) was used in the Spring of 1986 by Trivelpiece, then Director of the Office of Energy Research in the Department of Energy, to brief Martin and Under Secretary Joseph Salgado regarding his intention to reprogram $4 million to initiate the project with the approval of Secretary Herrington. This reprogramming was followed by a line item budget of $16 million the following year. This modest effort triggered the activities that led to the sequencing of the Human Genome. It is notable that this scientific gem was launched by the math, physics and supercomputing strengths of the Department of Energy. Trivelpiece and Martin, under the supervision of Secretary Herrington, also collaborated on a project to launch the Superconducting Super Collider.

In 1987, Acting Secretary of Energy Martin also joined President Reagan and members of his cabinet and the United States Supreme Court to celebrate the 200th anniversary of the ratification of the United States Constitution. President Reagan, accompanied by his Cabinet, spoke on the footsteps of the US Capitol addressing hundreds of thousands of Americans celebrating the event on the National Mall. Martin has continued to work with the DOE on various projects since his tenure as Deputy Secretary. From 2002 to 2004, he served on the Secretary's Advisory Board (SEAB), chairing the industry-government sub-committee and participated in the drafting of its 2003 report Critical Choices: Science, Energy and Security. Since 2002, he has been Chairman of the Nuclear Energy Advisory Committee (NEAC) and was a committee member of a SEAB group to review the Department of Science. Recently, he served in an advisory capacity on the DOE's Strategic Technology Energy Plan (STEP) aimed to utilize technological gains in energy efficiency to both reduce carbon emissions as well as overall energy consumption. His contribution to the project was to create an energy supply/demand ‘matrix’ approach to detail all sectors of energy use (industrial, commercial, residential etc.) and supplies to meet those demands. A sample matrix can be seen online.

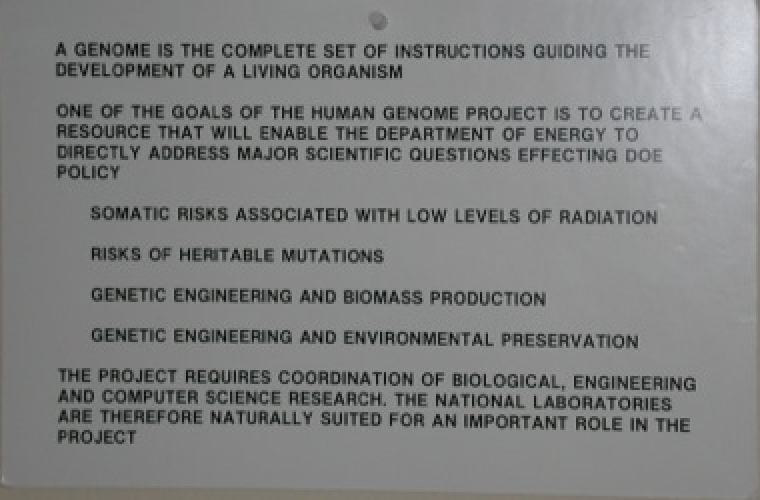
Proposal to Martin launching the Human Genome Project (1986)

Martin has testified more than twenty-five times before the US House of Representatives and US Senate on topics including: United States energy security; the US-Canada Free Trade Agreement; oil and gas tax policy; the future of natural gas; China's nuclear power prospects; US coal exports; electricity deregulation; the US-Japan Nuclear Cooperation Agreement; the priorities of the Department of Energy, the role of International Energy Agency; renewable energy prospects; the Strategic Petroleum Reserve; the Reagan-Gorbachev fusion agreement; and US economic sanctions policy. A full list and links to the individual testimonies can be found online. Many of Martin's Department of energy accomplishments -including being a founder of the Human Genome project and instigator of the magnetic fusion project ITER were summarized by Deputy Secretary of Energy Dan Brouillette at a ceremony in honor of Martin in 2018.

== Decorations and notability ==
=== International and United States Governmental Decorations ===
Martin’s decorations include The Department of Energy Secretary’s Gold Award, the Order of the Rising Sun (Japan, Gold and Silver Star) and the Distinguished Contribution to Diplomacy Medal (Czech Republic).

- Department of Energy Secretary’s Gold Award (USA)

- Order of the Rising Sun, Gold and Silver Star (Japan)

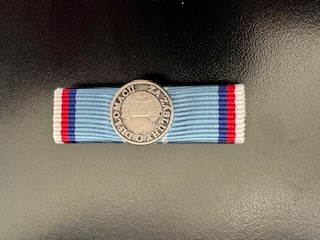
- Distinguished Contribution to Diplomacy Medal (Czech Republic)

== Republican Presidential campaigns ==
Martin has been part of the campaign of every Republican Presidential candidate since 1988. He has also served as a spokesman/surrogate speaker for the Presidential candidate on matters related to energy and the environment.

1988: First George H.W. Bush Campaign: Martin served as policy coordinator for the George H. W. Bush Presidential Campaign producing "Issues 88", a compilation of the policies of the campaign under the direction of Charles R. Black, Jr. and James Cicconi. His efforts were commended by George H. W. Bush in a letter that can be seen online.

1992: Second George H.W. Bush Campaign: Martin served as the Executive Director of the Republican Platform Committee and co-authored the Committee's volume, The Vision Shared: Uniting Our Family, Our Country, Our World. His responsibilities included managing hearings on topics of the Platform in Kansas City, Salt Lake City and Washington, D.C., culminating in the Platform discussions and presentation at the Republican National Convention in Houston.

1996: Robert Dole Campaign: Martin compiled an "Issues Book" for the campaign of Robert Dole building on the methodology and presentation of the 1988 Bush Issues Book. He was also commended by Dole for his effort in the following letter.

2000: George W. Bush Campaign: Martin prepared a national security transition memo at the time of the election of George W. Bush outlining the first year's national security priorities.

2008: John McCain Campaign: Martin prepared a national security issues paper and calendar for the campaign of John McCain.

2016: Donald Trump Campaign: Martin provided a national security calendar to the campaign of Donald Trump using a planning methodology he created at the NSC for Ronald Reagan in 1984).

== International studies ==
William Martin was elected to membership in the Council on Foreign Relations in 1983 and chaired the CFR’s energy security group from 1994 to 2004. In 1987, he was lead author in a Trilateral Commission report on Maintaining Energy Security in a Global Context. He also served as a member of the Board and head of development committee of the World Resources Institute. In 2000, he joined NSC colleague Roger Robinson and the Czech President Vaclav Havel to create the Robinson-Martin security scholars program of the Prague Security Studies Institute. In 2004, he joined the Nobel Prize recipient Joseph Stiglitz to chair a working group on energy for the DPRK for the United Nations. Mohamed Elbaradei, Director General of the IAEA, appointed Martin to coordinate a study of the future of IAEA which resulted in the report in 2008. Long interested in Japan issues, he established the Santa Fe seminar and leaders program to bring distinguished Americans and Japanese together to study the importance of safe nuclear energy. In 2013, he had the honor to be the only foreign participant to testify before Japan’s METI on nuclear power in the post Fukushima era.

== US-Japan Energy Institute ==
In 2024, Martin founded the US-Japan Energy Institute to prepare an archive of US-Japan Energy relations from the early 1950s onwards with a particular focus on nuclear energy. The Institute has received support of the US National Security Archives and the historian's office of the Department of Energy. In addition, consultations are held with Japanese electric power companies and the Japanese government, in particular the Ministry of Foreign Affairs, the Ministry of Economics and Industry and the Ministry of Education, Science and Technology.

== Business activities ==
Martin co-founded an international energy consulting firm, Washington Policy & Analysis Inc. with Scott L. Campbell in 1988 at the Washington law firm of Miller & Chevalier. WPA was later bought by the British company Lloyd's of London Press which later became part of Informa, UK.

== Recognition ==
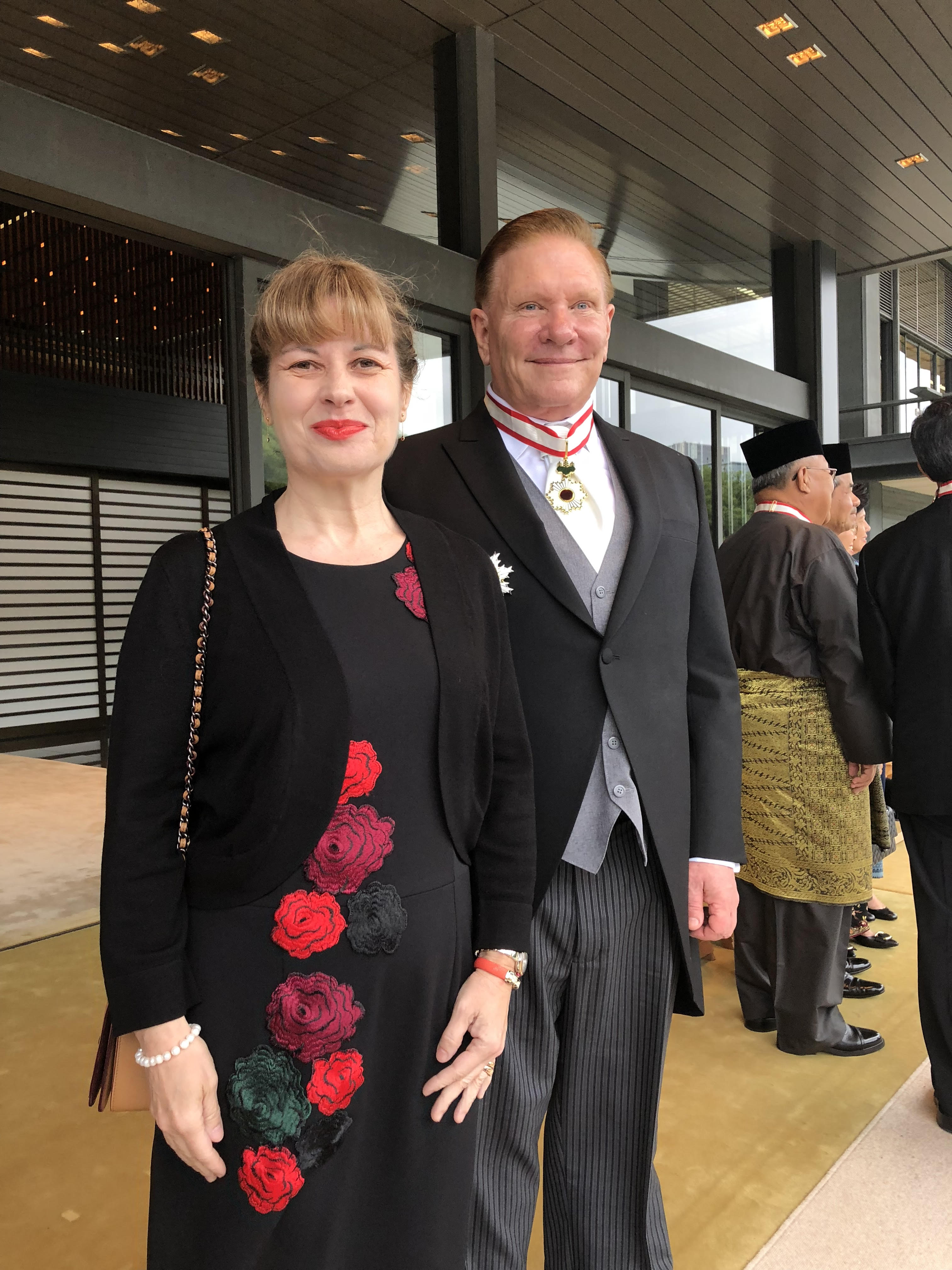
Martin and Audebert at the Imperial Palace to Receive the Order of the Rising Sun.

William Martin received seven personal letters of merit from Ronald Reagan. The President commended him for efforts on European gas supplies, the 1983 Williamsburg Summit, the 1984 UN General Assembly, the 1985 Reagan-Gorbachev Summit, Reagan's 1983 trip to Asia, Reagan's 1984 trip to China, and Martin’s tenure as the Executive Secretary of the National Security Council.

On May 8, 2018, William Martin was awarded the Order of the Rising Sun, Gold and Silver star by the Emperor Akihito of Japan in a ceremony in the Imperial Palace in Tokyo for his work in strengthening US-Japan cooperation in nuclear energy.

Martin was honored by Czech President Vaclav Havel for founding the Robinson-Martin security scholars program in Prague which has educated over one thousand students in the Czech Republic. In 2023, he was awarded the Czech Republic “Distinguished Metal in Diplomacy” by the Foreign Minister of Czech Republic.

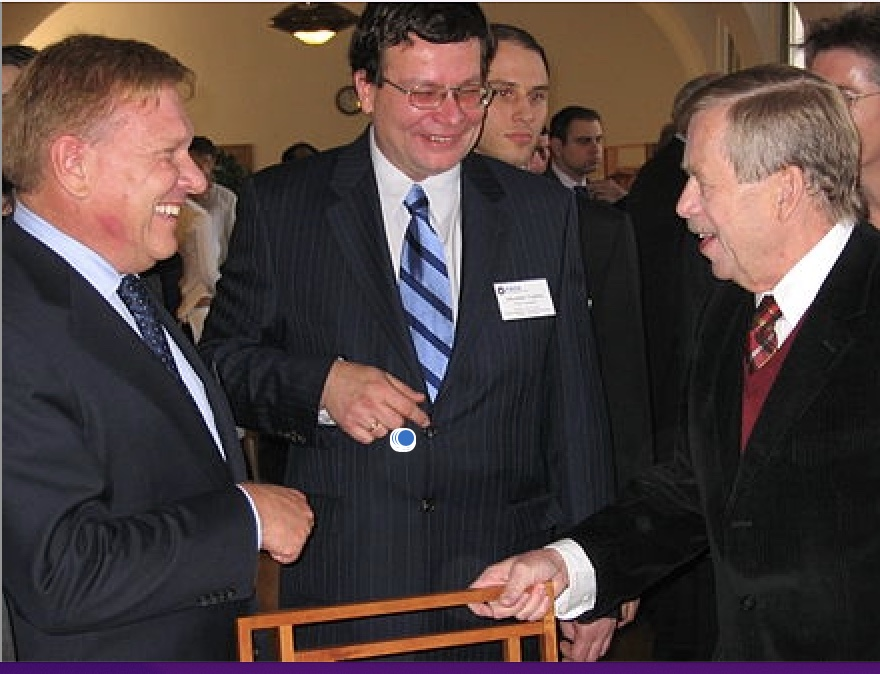
Martin and President Havel

Martin was an early recipient of the highest award of the Department of Energy: the Secretary’s Gold Metal. Having served the Department of Energy for thirty years, Secretary of Energy Dan Brouillette honored Martin for his DOE accomplishments in his remarks at the Japanese Ambassador’s residence on October 4, 2019. He noted Martin’s leadership role in US energy policy, his role as a founder of the Human Genome and ITER projects, and his work to strengthen US-Japan nuclear relations.

The Secretary General of the United Nations BAN Ki-Moon recognized Martin’s eight years of distinguished service on the Board of the UN University for Peace, including Martin’s tenure as President of the Council of the University.

The Executive Director of the International Energy Agency, Dr. Fatih Birol, has described William Martin’s fifty year career as a leader in the field of energy security. "Your trusted counsel to Presidents Reagan, the Bushes, Obama, and others has helped ensure that the IEA remains anchored in its founding mission: to secure reliable, affordable energy for all. Many believe that you are one of the fathers of energy security. Your work—from your early response to the Iranian Revolution to your continued advocacy for coordinated strategic reserves in an increasingly volatile world— has helped shape the lEA's workplans for decades."

== Personal life ==
Martin has two sons and was married to Jill Wheaton Martin from 1974 to 2008. Nicholas Carl Martin (born August 10, 1982) is a graduate of Swarthmore College and the University for Peace and is President of TechChange, which was recently spotlighted in The Economist Christopher Flynn Martin (born February 7, 1984) is a graduate of the University of Pennsylvania (BA in Psychology) and Kyoto University (Doctorate of Science in Biology). Previously a researcher at the Primate Research Institute of Kyoto University Dr. Christopher Martin is now a research scientist at the Indianapolis Zoo.

William Martin married Paule Audebert of Annecy, France in 2013. They have one daughter, Dany Audebert Martin, who was born on March 13, 2019.

Martin is from a pioneering Oklahoma political and oil family. His great-grandfather Dennis T. Flynn was the first US Delegate from Oklahoma Territory to the U.S. House of Representatives, and is the first inductee into the Oklahoma Hall of Fame. His grandfather Olney Flynn was mayor of Tulsa and the Republican nominee for Governor of Oklahoma in 1948. One of Martin's ancestors was John Chisum, the Texas cattleman portrayed by John Wayne in the movie Chisum.
