= University for Peace =

University and international organization

- Universidad para la Paz
- Other names: UPEACE (English); UPAZ (Spanish)
- Motto: Si quieres la paz, trabaja por la paz
- Motto in English: If you want peace, work for peace.
- Type: United Nations-established graduate university
- Established: 1980
- Founder: Rodrigo Carazo Odio
- Accreditation: SINAES
- Rector: Francisco Rojas Aravena
- Dean: Juan Carlos Sainz-Borgo
- Students: 550 (2023/2024)
- Location: Calle Universidad, El Rodeo de Mora, San José, Costa Rica; 9°55′10″N 84°16′22″W
- Campus: Campus in nature (includes a protected forest reserve)
- Language: English, Spanish
- Website: upeace.org
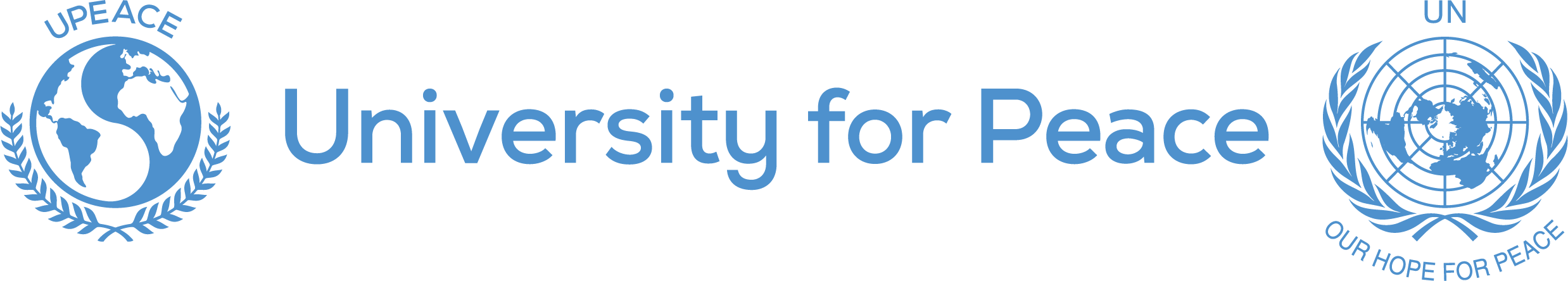

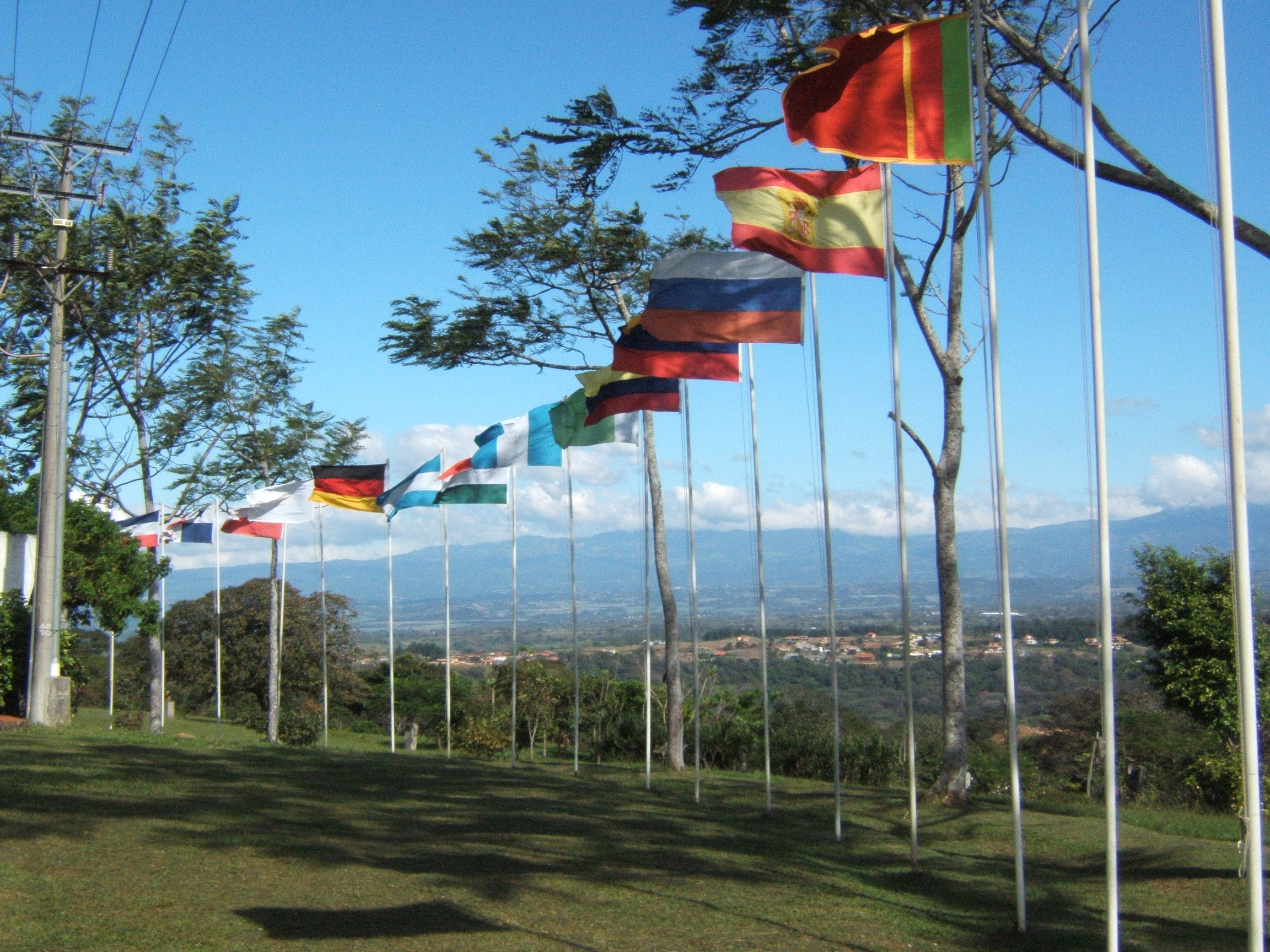
View of Costa Rica Campus

The University for Peace (UPEACE) is an international university and intergovernmental organization established as a treaty organisation by the United Nations General Assembly (UNGA) in 1980. The university offers postgraduate, doctoral, and executive programmes related to the study of peace and conflict, environment and development, and international law.

The headquarters of the University for Peace are located in a natural area near Ciudad Colón, Costa Rica. However, the university also has a presence in other countries, notably Somalia and the Netherlands.

The charter of the University for Peace, adopted by the UNGA in resolution 35/55 in 1980, defines the mission of the university as follows:

"to provide humanity with an international institution of higher education for peace with the aim of promoting among all human beings the spirit of understanding, tolerance and peaceful coexistence, to stimulate cooperation among peoples and to help lessen obstacles and threats to world peace and progress, in keeping with the noble aspirations proclaimed in the Charter of the United Nations."

The organization has observer status in the UNGA and maintains a permanent office at the UN headquarters in New York.

== History and relationship with United Nations ==
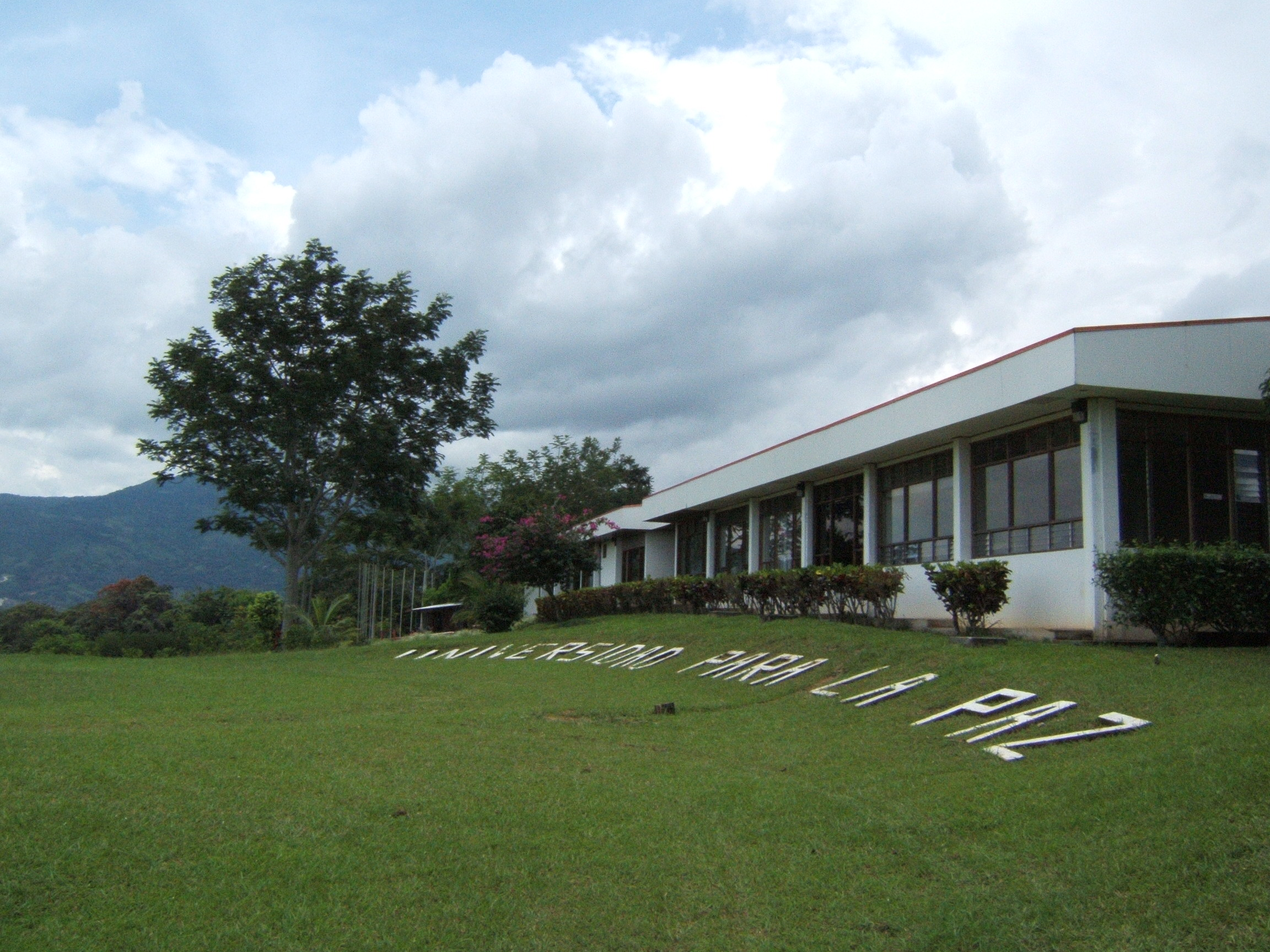
UPEACE Rodrigo Carazo Campus, Costa Rica

The University for Peace was set in motion by a treaty endorsed by resolution 34/111 of 14 December 1979 of the United Nations General Assembly. This resolution also established an international commission which, in collaboration with the government of Costa Rica, was requested to prepare the proposed university's organization and structure -- setting in motion the creation of the University for Peace. Thereafter, by Resolution 35/55 of 5 December 1980, the UN General Assembly endorsed the treaty establishing the University for Peace by adopting the International Agreement for the Establishment of the University for Peace along with the Charter of the University for Peace.

In 1999, Secretary-General Kofi Annan took further steps to revitalize the University for Peace by changing its focus from that of a local and regional institution to a more globally-focused perspective. Accompanying this change in focus was a change of the university's working language, from Spanish to English, and launch of its African program.

The University for Peace is part of the academic wing of the UN system, and has observer status at the UN General Assembly, while maintaining its independence in academic, financial and management matters. The UN Secretary-General is the honorary president of UPEACE. As the university is mandated by the General Assembly, the UN Secretary-General reports periodically on the activities of the University for Peace.

The main body of governance of the university is the Council of the University for Peace. It is composed of 17 members, ten of which are appointed by the Secretary-General of the UN and the Director-General of UNESCO, two nominated by the government of Costa Rica, and others being high-level staff of the University for Peace, the United Nations University, and the United Nations.

== Headquarters and main campus ==
The main campus of the university, the Rodrigo Carazo Campus, is 30 km south-west of San José, Costa Rica. Most master's and doctoral programmes are administered from this location. The university has a mix of both resident and visiting faculty members.

The closest town to the mountain on which the university is perched is Ciudad Colón, which is where most of the students, staff, and faculty members of the university reside.

=== Earth Charter Initiative ===
The main campus of the University for Peace hosts the International Secretariat of the Earth Charter Initiative, whose stated mission is "to promote the transition to sustainable ways of living and a global society founded on a shared ethical framework that includes respect and care for the community of life, ecological integrity, universal human rights, respect for diversity, economic justice, democracy, and a culture of peace." This mission is carried out using the Earth Charter as the principal guiding framework.

In 2012, the Earth Charter Initiative and the University for Peace were jointly awarded the UNESCO Chair on Education for Sustainable Development and the Earth Charter. The work related to this UNESCO chair is carried out at the 'Earth Charter Center for Education for Sustainable Development', which opened at the UPEACE main campus in 2014.

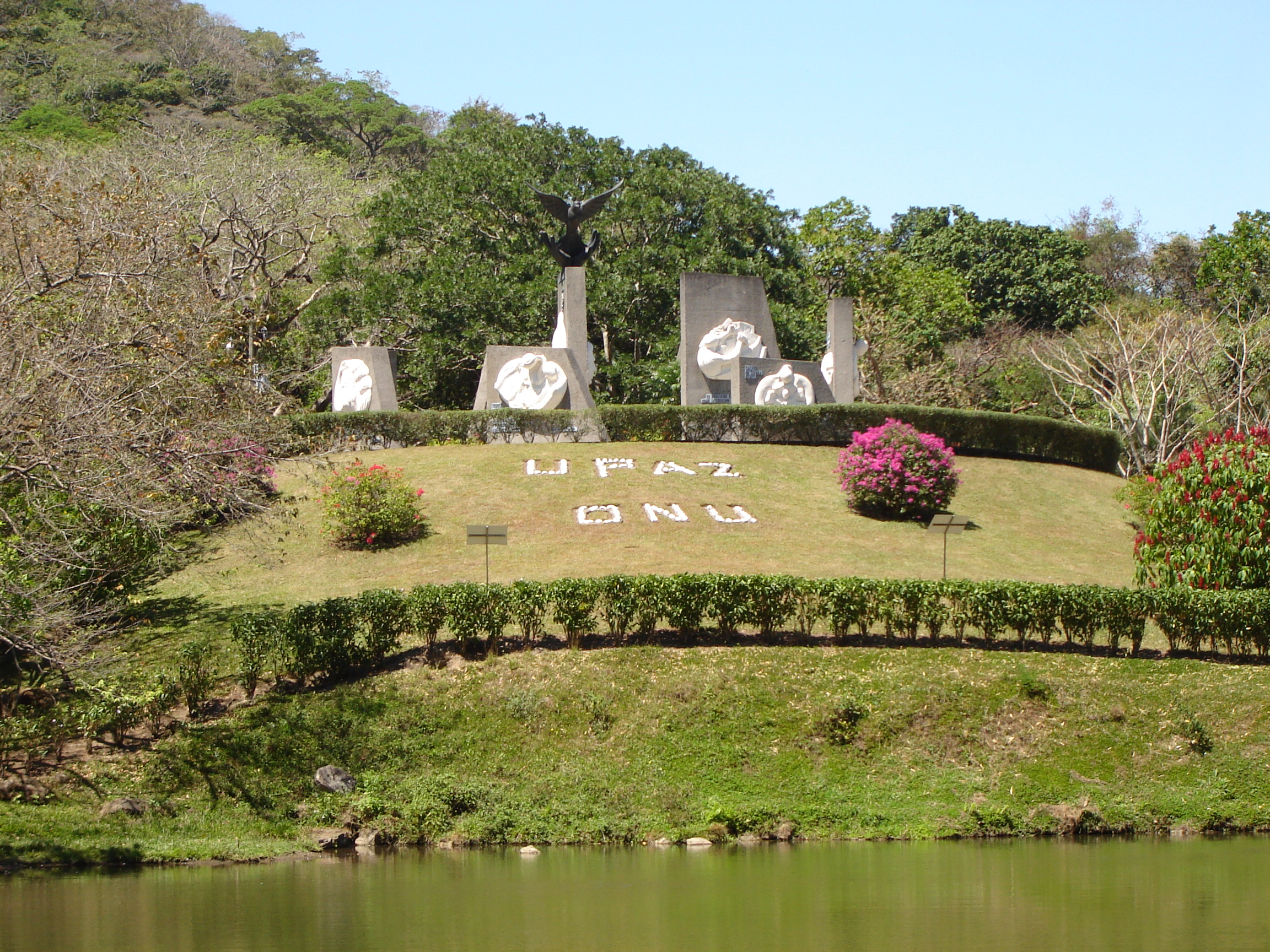
View of the “Monument to Work, Disarmament, and Peace” sculpted by Thelvia Marín in 1989.

=== Peace Park and nature reserve ===
The campus is surrounded by a natural reserve (Peace Park) composed of a secondary forest and the last remnant of primary forest (200 ha) in the Central Valley of Costa Rica. It shelters mammals such as monkeys and deer, reptiles, and over 300 species of birds, as well as approximately 100 varieties of trees. The university's installations and protected area make up 303 ha. The park contains several hiking trails and monuments to peacebuilders. One of these is the Monument to Work, Disarmament, and Peace created by Cuban sculptor Thelvia Marín. This gigantic spiral-shaped monument is the largest sculptural complex on such social and historical themes and the ongoing pursuit of peace in Central America. It was inaugurated in 1989 by the presidents of Costa Rica, Rodrigo Carazo, Rafael A. Calderón, Oscar Arias, and José Figueres. Carazo was the President Emeritus of the Council of the University for Peace, an organization created by the UN to serve as an example of unity among nations, inspired by a powerful triad: progress, peace, and global solidarity.

== International activities ==
In addition to the activities at the Costa Rica campus, the University for Peace has several international offices and partners.

=== Africa ===
The University for Peace established its Africa program in 2002. The programme aims to stimulate and strengthen the capacities in Africa to teach, train and conduct research in areas of peace and conflict studies. As part of the programme, the university has established capacity-building agreements with 27 institutions in Africa, mainly universities.

The first five years of the program focused on the development of curricula and teaching materials and the delivery of a range of short courses, workshops, conferences and seminars in various parts of Africa. Within this period, the program attracted close to one thousand participants from academia, policy-makers and civil society organizations.

Since 2007, the Africa programme has worked with a number of partner universities to develop master's degree programs to be based at African universities. The principal aim of this endeavour is to further strengthen the African capacity and build a wide expertise for a better understanding of conflicts in Africa, their prevention and the creation of the environment favourable to lasting peace and development in the region.

In partnership with the Institute for Peace, Security and Development, UPEACE offers master's and PhD programmes related to the university's academic profile in Somalia. In 2022, 166 students graduated from the Somalia programme. The incumbent president of the Somalia, Hassan Sheikh Mohamud, defended his Ph.D. thesis at the University for Peace. The university announced its intention to start a Ph.D. scholarship programme named after Hassan.

=== Europe ===
In January 2012, UPEACE opened a centre in The Hague, Netherlands, which is housed at the Academy Building of the Peace Palace. It promotes the activities of the university in Europe and works on education and research in peace studies, cooperating with academic and policy-oriented institutions in The Hague region.

The Geneva Office of the University for Peace was established in 2001. The focus of the Geneva office is to contribute to the development of programmatic activities of the university in Africa and the Middle East, engaging with the academic community in Geneva, and facilitation of institutional relations within Europe and with the United Nations system.

=== Asia ===
Until 2023, the University for Peace jointly organised the Asian Peacebuilders Scholarship Programme (APS) with the Nippon Foundation and Ateneo de Manila University. APS graduates obtained a Master of Arts degree from the University for Peace and a Master's degree in Transdisciplinary Social Development from Ateneo de Manila University.

== Academics ==
The University for Peace offers graduate, doctoral, and executive programmes in the areas of peace, environment and international law. The educational and research activities are organised in four departments: international law, peace and conflict studies, environment and development, and regional studies. The latter department offers education in Spanish rather than English. In addition to its own programmes, the university offers joint programmes with American University, IHE Delft Institute for Water Education, Pace University, UNITAR, Ateneo de Manila University and several other organisations.

=== Department of International Law ===
- MA in International Law and the Settlement of Disputes
- MA in International Law and Human Rights (available in both English and in Spanish)
- MA in International Law and Diplomacy

=== Department of Peace and Conflict Studies ===
- MA in Conflict Resolution, Peace and Development (taught in Spanish)
- MA in Gender and Peacebuilding
- MA in Indigenous Science and Peace Studies
- MA in International Peace Studies
- MA in Peace Education
- MA in Religion, Culture and Peace Studies
- MA in Sustainable Peace in the Contemporary World (online)

=== Department of Environment and Development ===
- MA in Environment, Development and Peace (available in both English and in Spanish)
- MA in Responsible Management and Sustainable Economic Development
- MSc in Ecology and Society

=== Department of Regional Studies ===
- MA in Derecho Internacional de los Derechos Humanos
- MA in Resolución de Conflictos, Paz y Desarollo
- MA in Ambiente, Desarrollo y Paz

=== Dual and joint masters degrees ===
- Conflict Resolution & Coexistence and International Law & Human Rights (dual MA with Brandeis University, US)
- Cybercrime, Cybersecurity and International Law (joint LL.M. with United Nations Interregional Crime and Justice Research Institute, Turin, Italy)
- Development Studies and Diplomacy (joint MA with UNITAR)
- Environmental Law and International Law & Human Rights (LLM/MA with Pace University)
- Human Rights and a Culture for Peace (joint MA with Pontifical Xavierian University, Colombia)
- International Law and Human Rights (dual MA with Hankuk University of Foreign Studies, Seoul, Korea)
- Media, Peace and Conflict Studies (dual MA with Hankuk University of Foreign Studies, Seoul, Korea)
- Natural Resources and Sustainable Development (dual MA with American University, Washington DC, USA)
- Sustainable Development (dual MA with Hankuk University of Foreign Studies, Seoul, Korea)
- Transnational Crime and Justice (joint LL.M. with United Nations Interregional Crime and Justice Research Institute, Turin, Italy)
- Water Cooperation and Diplomacy (triple MA/MSc/MS with IHE Delft Institute for Water Education, The Netherlands and Oregon State University, USA)

=== Doctoral program ===
The University for Peace has a doctoral programme in peace and conflict studies since 2012. The programme offers a research track and a professional track.

=== Accreditation ===
The university has been a member organisation of the Costa Rican accreditation organisation SINAES since 2008. SINAES has evaluated and accredited the larger graduate programmes at the university, while its other programmes are in the process of accreditation.

Additionally, degrees awarded by the university are recognized under international law, as the Charter of the University for Peace gives the authority to "grant master's degrees and doctorates". As the resolution to establish the University for Peace was taken by consensus in the General Assembly, the authorisation to award degrees is in theory legally valid in all countries.

University for Peace degrees are verified by the International Association of Universities/UNESCO.

== Human rights outreach ==
The University for Peace has also established the UPEACE Human Rights Centre which was created within the contours of the broader mission of the university. The work of the UPEACE Human Rights Centre seeks to promote understanding, respect and enjoyment of universal human rights. The centre carries out this objective through human rights education, training, research, capacity building, and awareness-raising activities.

The University for Peace hosts the Office of Free Legal Assistance for Journalists in Costa Rica. In 2023, the office presented a critical report about the access to information and media during the 2022 elections.

== Notable staff ==
- Francisco Rojas Aravena, Chilean academic and rector
- Mihir Kanade, Indian academic and Chair-Rapporteur of the Intergovernmental Working Group on the Right to Development

== Notable alumni ==
- Kirthi Jayakumar, Indian peace educator, feminist activist and writer
- Rosebell Kagumire, Ugandan journalist
- Mihir Kanade, Chair-Rapporteur of the Intergovernmental Working Group on the Right to Development and Professor at the University for Peace (Ph.D.)
- Guled Salah Barre, Somali politician (Ph.D.)
- Nick Martin, American technologist, entrepreneur, and educator and founder of TechChange.
- Abdirizak Omar Mohamed, Somali politician (Ph.D.)
- Hassan Sheikh Mohamud, President of Somalia (Ph.D.)
- Anat Nir, Israeli businessperson and LGBT rights activist
- María Mercedes Peñas Domingo, Spanish-Costa Rican political scientist
- José Antonio Sanahuja, Professor of International Relations at Complutense University of Madrid
- Billene Seyoum, Ethiopian politician, poet, author and feminist
- Musa Sani Nuhu, Nigeria’s Permanent Representative to the Economic Community of West African States (ECOWAS) from 2020 to 2025.

== See also ==
- Peace and conflict studies
- United Nations University
- Earth Charter Initiative
- UNESCO
- United Nations
- The U.S. Association for the University for Peace
- United Nations Institute for Training and Research
