= Irene Ikomu =

- Born: 1990 (age 35–36); Uganda
- Education: Nabisunsa Girls Secondary School; Makerere University (LLB); IE University (Executive MBA); Brown University (Executive MBA)
- Occupations: Lawyer, Civic Tech Leader, Social Innovator
- Organizations: CEO, Muyi Consulting Group; Member, Restless Development Uganda Board of Trustees; Former Manager, East Africa Civil Society Initiative (Aga Khan Development Network); * USAID Democracy, Rights, and Governance Advisory Board (2014–2016)
- Known for: Parliament Watch Uganda; The Citizen Report; * National Debate Council Uganda
- Notable work: Parliament Watch Uganda
- Awards: Young Female Lawyer of the Year (2014); Mandela Washington Fellow (2014); Generation Change Fellow, YALI Summit

Irene Ikomu (born 1990) is a Ugandan lawyer based in Kampala, who advocates for democracy and good governance in Uganda. Irene also manages Parliament Watch Uganda, an initiative that monitors activities done by the parliament and then disseminates the information to the public. She has been behind several social change startups that have employed young people in Uganda. Ikomu sat on the USAID Uganda-supported democracy, rights, and governance board in 2021, and was recognized as an outstanding leader by the American embassy, where she was selected to serve as a Generation Change Fellow in the Young African Leaders Initiative summit, Washington DC.

== Education and background ==
Irene Ikomu was born in 1990, in the western region of Uganda. She studied from Nabisunsa Girls Secondary School for her secondary education, later she joined Makerere university where she graduated with a Bachelor of Law(LLB). While at Makerere, Irene participated in many activities and societies, such as being a tournament director, 2013 Makerere Moot competition, Community Law Program and mobile clinic(CLAPMOC), Makerere law society, Makerere Law Society, and Makerere Debating Union. Irene later enrolled at IE University where she completed with an executive MBA. She then joined Brown University where she obtained an Executive Master's in Business Administration.

== Career ==
Irene Ikomu is a lawyer. She worked with the Heinrich Boell Foundation as a consultant on civic spaces in the East and Horn of Africa. She also managed the East Africa Civil Society Initiative under the Aga Khan Development Network, focusing on enhancing civil society institutions across Uganda, Rwanda, Kenya, and Tanzania.

She is a co-founder and manager of Parliament Watch Uganda, a project that uses technology to monitor parliament activities. She was also a Mandela Washington fellow in 2014 and won the Young Female Lawyer of the Year Award from the Uganda Law Society for her role in promoting democracy in Uganda.

Irene Komu is a Hurford fellow studying how young people are finding new ways to participate in politics outside of traditional systems. She is exploring how they challenge the usual political norms in the digital age and learning from their creative approaches to building democratic spaces in their countries.

== Achievements ==
- CEO of Muyi Consulting Group, a strategic advisory firm
- Co-founder of The Citizen Report and Parliament Watch Uganda- civic tech initiatives supporting innovative citizen engagement.
- Worked with the Heinrich Boell Stiftung and the Aga Khan Foundation, supporting resilient civil society across 6 countries in Eastern Africa
- Member of the Restless Development Uganda Board of Trustees.
- Female lawyer of the year 2014.
- Recognized for her role as a generation mover in politics, NGO's (non governmental organizations) and private sector.
- Hurford fellow, National Endowment for Democracy
- USAID advisory Board member (Jan 2014 - Dec 2016)
- Co founder National Debate council - Uganda. January 2010, Kampala Uganda.

== See also ==
- Rosebell Kagumire
- Nancy Kacungira
- Sarah Bireete
- Agather Atuhaire
- Seanice Kacungira
