= The U.S. Association for the University for Peace =

U.S. Association for the University for Peace (UPEACE/US)
- Founded: 2006
- Type: 501(c)(3) nonprofit organization
- Purpose: Promoting higher education for peace
- Location: Washington D.C.
- Region served: Worldwide
- Method: Advocacy, Education, Fundraising
- Key people: Nick Martin and Rebecca Harned
- Website: http://www.upeaceus.org

The U.S. Association for the University for Peace (UPEACE/US) is a 501(c)(3) nonprofit organization established to advance the United Nations mandated University for Peace and the practice of education for peace in the United States.

== Programs ==
UPEACE/US maintains three key objectives: to educate and train for peace, to manage the Global Network for Upeacebuilders, and to support the strategic development of the UPEACE system.

=== DCPEACE ===
UPEACE/US has partnered with educators, administration, and parents in the District of Columbia Public School system to design and implement a peace education and conflict prevention program for the 2008-2009 school year. The program is called DCPEACE and consists of educator trainings, curriculum enhancement, parent workshops, skills for understanding, and PeaceRooms.

=== PeaceRooms ===
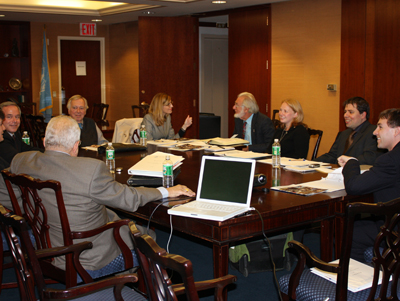
Board Meeting

PeaceRooms is a virtual platform that allows students connect with partner schools from different countries for a year-long collaboration. PeaceRooms also provides supplemental collaborative lesson plans based on a University for Peace-approved peace education methodology which is subsequently integrated into the regular curriculum. These lesson plans focus on core concepts of identity, intercultural sensitivity, and conflict resolution. Students learn about conflict resolution and explore themes such as multiculturalism, diversity, mutual understanding and world citizenship.

=== Support for the University for Peace ===
In collaboration with UPEACE, UPEACE/US works to recruit students, raise funds, bridge partnerships, support the UPEACE Africa program, and increase visibility for the university within the United States. By fostering relationships that advance the operations of the UPEACE system and securing resources that enhance the quality and depth of UPEACE program, their goal is to establish UPEACE as the worldwide leading institution in peace education.

== Achievements ==
- Creation of a scholarship program
- Development of a special projects fund
- Formation of a UPEACE merchandise program
- Launch of Upeacebuilders, the alumni network website
- Integration of peace education in D.C. public schools

== See also ==
- University for Peace
