= Nick Martin (educator) =

American technologist

Nicholas Carl Martin
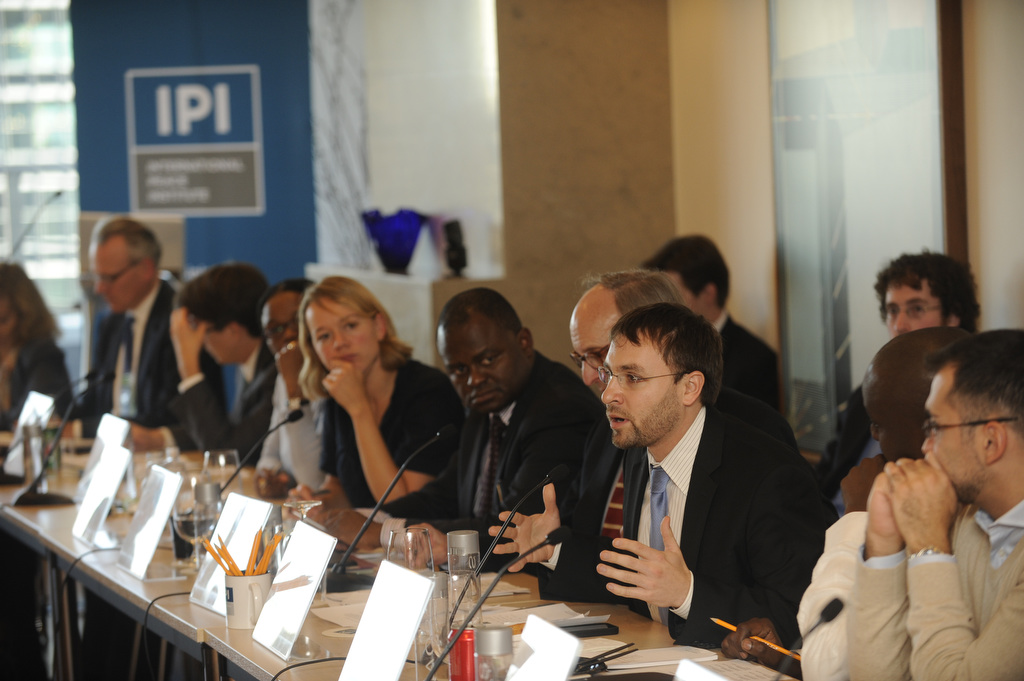
- Martin speaking at the United Nations in 2011
- Education: Swarthmore College (BA); University for Peace (MA)
- Occupations: Educator, entrepreneur, technologist Founder and President of TechChange

Nicholas Carl Martin is an American technologist, entrepreneur, and educator best known for founding the international organization TechChange in 2010.

== Early life and education ==
Martin is the son of William Flynn Martin who is a former United States Deputy Secretary of Energy. Martin graduated from Swarthmore College with honors and holds a Bachelor of Arts in English literature and education. Martin also earned a Master of Arts in peace education from the University for Peace.

Prior to founding TechChange, Martin started an award-winning conflict resolution and technology program for Washington, D.C. elementary schools called DCPEACE.

== Career ==
=== TechChange ===
Martin founded TechChange in 2010. His work with TechChange has been profiled by the New York Times, Fast Company, Forbes, and the Economist. Martin is a fellow of PopTech Social Innovation, Ariane de Rothschild, and the International Youth Foundation. In 2014, he was runner-up in the Society for International Development’s Rice Award which honors an innovator in the field of international development who is under the age of 32.

=== Other work ===
Martin has delivered a number of speeches at the United Nations, the United States Department of State, and the United States Agency for International Development (USAID) on the role of technology in international development, online learning, capacity building and m-learning.

Martin has also written numerous pieces on e-learning, m-learning, and m-health for multiple organisations, including the Chronicle of Higher Education, the Stanford Social Innovation Review, The Guardian, and Dowser.org.

As of November 2013, Martin is also an adjunct faculty member at Columbia University, George Washington University and Georgetown University.
