= Mihir Kanade =

Indian academic

- Citizenship: India
- Education: Nagpur University (LL.B.); University for Peace (MA, PhD)
- Known for: Right to development
- Scientific career
- Fields: International law Human rights and development
- Workplaces: University for Peace; United Nations Human Rights Council
- Thesis: The Multilateral Trading System and Human Rights: A Governance Space Theory on Linkages (2015)

Mihir Kanade is an author and professor of international law, human rights and development at the University for Peace (UPEACE), a university founded by the United Nations. He holds the concurrent positions of the Academic Coordinator of UPEACE since 2016, the Head of its Department of International Law since 2014, and the Director of the UPEACE Human Rights Centre since 2009.

Kanade is best known for his contribution to the promotion of the human right to development. He chairs the drafting group appointed by the Office of the United Nations High Commissioner for Human Rights and the Chair-Rapporteur of the Intergovernmental Working Group on the Right to Development, for preparing the “zero draft” of a legally binding instrument on the right to development. On 13 March 2020, Kanade was elected by the United Nations Human Rights Council as a member of the Expert Mechanism on the Right to Development in representation of the Asia-Pacific region. The Human Rights Council renewed his mandate for another three years on 4 April 2023.

== Career ==
=== Academic and policy work ===
Kanade began his career as a lawyer practicing before the Bombay High Court (Bombay and Nagpur benches) and the Supreme Court of India in 2003, acting as an arguing and assisting counsel in several reported cases. Kanade joined UPEACE in 2009 as a faculty member in the Department of International Law and as the Director of the UPEACE Human Rights Centre. In 2014, he was appointed as the Head of the Department of International Law, and has additionally held the position of the Academic Coordinator of UPEACE since 2017.

He is also an adjunct faculty at Universidad Alfonso X El Sabio (Spain), Long Island University (LIU Global Centre in Costa Rica), and Universidad de Los Andes (Colombia), and has taught courses on Gender Mainstreaming in Peacekeeping Operations at Cheikh Anta Diop University (Senegal). Kanade serves as the academic co-coordinator of the LLM programme in Transnational Crime and Justice offered at the United Nations Interregional Crime and Justice Research Institute (UNICRI), Turin, Italy. He has served on the International Advisory Board of the International Bar Association on the topic of Business and Human Rights.

Kanade has worked, researched and taught extensively in the interface between globalization and its impacts on human rights, including themes such as global governance, international trade, protection of refugees, statelessness, health, indigenous peoples’ rights, sustainable development, business and human rights, among others. He is the author of the book The Multilateral Trading System and Human Rights: A Governance Space Theory on Linkages published in 2018. In this book, Kanade introduced a new theory called as “governance space” to serve as a framework for analyzing diverse linkages between the multilateral trading system and human rights, and proposed the right to development as the normative framework for resolving tensions.

=== Work on the right to development ===
Kanade has been a prominent figure in the promotion of the right to development, especially in the context of implementation of the 2030 Agenda for Sustainable Development. On 15 June 2016, at the invitation of its President, Kanade addressed the 32nd session of the UN Human Rights Council on the topic of ‘Operationalizing the Right to Development for Implementing the SDGs’, as part of a special panel convened to commemorate the 30th anniversary of the 1986 UN Declaration on the Right to Development. In conjunction with the OHCHR and the UNU-IIGH, Kanade co-leads an e-learning project for training UN staff, diplomats, staff of governmental and non-governmental organizations, on Operationalizing the Right to Development in Implementation of the SDGs. He also leads a joint project between UPEACE and OHCHR to deliver training to various stakeholders on mainstreaming the right to development in Voluntary National Review Reporting for realizing the SDGs. He has also addressed Member States at the UN Human Rights Council as a panelist, and moderator, in side events promoting the right to development in the context of realization of the SDGs.

Kanade has for long been a strong advocate for a legally binding instrument on the right to development and has played an active role in the process of its elaboration. He was invited by the Chair-Rapporteur of the Intergovernmental Working Group on the Right to Development at its 20th session in Geneva to provide expert advice to Member States on the “formulation of the right to development and the nature of obligations of State parties to a legally binding instrument on the right to development”, in pursuance of Resolution 39/9 of the UN Human Rights Council. Following this, Kanade was appointed as the chair of the drafting group of international experts for preparing a legally binding instrument on the right to development. His mandate included drafting extensive commentaries on the zero draft of the treaty. Kanade has thereafter led the legal discussions at the Working Group on the Right to Development at its 21st, 22nd and 23rd sessions, as well as the process of revising the draft convention along with updated commentaries.

On 13 March 2020, Kanade was elected by the UN Human Rights Council as a member of the Expert Mechanism on the Right to Development, a subsidiary body of the UN Human Rights Council on 27 September 2019 through Resolution 42/23. Kanade was elected as a representative of the Asia-Pacific Region on the expert mechanism. During this mandate, Kanade authored a thematic study on "Operationalizing the Right to Development in Implementing the Sustainable Development Goals". This study provides guidance to States and other stakeholders on operationalizing the right to development in achieving the Sustainable Development Goals incorporated in the 2030 Agenda for Sustainable Development, focusing on their means of implementation and the duty of States for international cooperation. It also highlights the heightened importance and urgency of bringing the 2030 Agenda back on track during and in the aftermath of the coronavirus disease (COVID-19) pandemic. He was reappointed by the Human Rights Council on this mandate on 4 April 2023.

=== Education and other professional work ===
Kanade has an LLB from Nagpur University (India) and a Master’s degree in International Law and the Settlement of Disputes and a Doctorate in Peace and Conflict Studies from UPEACE. Apart from his work on globalization, human rights, and development, Kanade also teaches and publishes on the international law dimensions of peace and conflicts, as well as on the role of international law and adjudication in conflict resolution and transformation.

He is the founder of two professional development online diploma programmes on “Human Rights and Forced Displacement”, and “Sustainable Development and Human Rights”, offered by the UPEACE Human Rights Centre.

Kanade has also led projects for training several national and multinational corporations in Panama, Nicaragua and Costa Rica on mainstreaming human rights into corporate activities. He, however, has been a fierce critique of the legal principles adopted in the UN Guiding Principles on Business and Human Rights insofar as they deny legally binding obligations on businesses under international law to respect human rights (that is, do no harm to human rights of others), and also deny obligations on home States to require their corporations to respect human rights when they operate extraterritorially.

== Recognition in press ==
Kanade’s appointment as the Chair-Rapporteur of the drafting group for preparing a legally binding instrument on the Right to Development was covered in the national press in India, as well as in the local press of his hometown, Nagpur. On 4 March 2020, Maharashtra Times published an article in Marathi language, recognizing the contribution of Kanade to world peace through his work at UPEACE and on development.
