= Earth Charter Initiative =

Global network promoting UN declaration

The Earth Charter Initiative
- Type: Non-governmental organization
- Founded: 2000
- Headquarters: San José, Costa Rica
- Area served: Environmentalism
- Website: www.earthcharter.org

The Earth Charter Initiative is the collective name for the global network of people, organizations, and institutions who participate in promoting the Earth Charter, and in implementing its principles in practice. The Initiative is a broad-based, voluntary, civil society effort, but participants include leading international institutions, national government agencies, university associations, NGOs, cities, faith groups, and many well-known leaders in sustainable development.

== Mission and goals ==
The stated mission of the Earth Charter Initiative is to promote the transition to sustainable ways of living and a global society founded on a shared ethical framework that includes respect and care for the community of life, ecological integrity, universal human rights, respect for diversity, economic justice, democracy, and a culture of peace.

=== Goals ===
1. To raise awareness worldwide of the Earth Charter and to promote understanding of its inclusive ethical vision.
2. To seek recognition and endorsement of the Earth Charter by individuals, organizations, and the United Nations.
3. To promote the use of the Earth Charter as an ethical guide and the implementation of its principles by civil society, business, and government.
4. To encourage and support the educational use of the Earth Charter in schools, universities, religious communities, local communities, and many other settings.
5. To promote recognition and use of the Earth Charter as a soft law document.

=== Strategic objectives ===
- To promote development of a global network of Earth Charter supporters and activists with the collaboration of advisors, affiliates, partner organizations, and task forces.
- To create and disseminate high quality communications and educational materials to different target groups that will reach millions of people.
- To translate key Earth Charter materials in all major languages of the world.
- To set up Earth Charter websites in all countries in partnership with key individuals and organizations.
- To promote the Earth Charter vision in key local, national and international events and engage individuals and organizations in applying it in their areas of activity.
- To position the Earth Charter in relation to important international initiatives and processes so that its ethical framework can be used as a guide in efforts to address urgent challenges such as climate change, biodiversity loss, the Millennium Development Goals, food security, and conflict resolution.
- To undertake training programmes to facilitate the uptake and application of the Earth Charter in different sectors.
- To develop the guidance and instruments to help organizations, businesses, and local communities use the Earth Charter to assess progress toward sustainable development.

== Organization ==
A formal network of affiliates, partners, and youth groups helps to promote the Earth Charter around the world. Many of these representatives are based in prominent national-level organizations and institutions.

The Initiative is served and coordinated by Earth Charter International, which is composed by an Executive Office called the ECI Secretariat, and by the ECI Council. The Secretariat is composed by a very small staff, and it is based at the University for Peace campus in San José, Costa Rica. The Council is equivalent to a Board, they meet once a year and provide strategic guidance to the Secretariat and the EC Initiative.

== Earth Charter Youth Program ==
The Earth Charter Youth program is a network of youth NGOs and young activists who share a common interest in sustainable development and the Earth Charter. Severn Cullis-Suzuki from Vancouver, Canada was nominated as youth representative in the Earth Charter Commission, which oversaw the drafting process. At the age of 17, Severn participated in the Earth Summit of 1997 and made sure that concerns of young people were taken seriously in the process of drafting the Earth Charter. She contributed to the inclusion of principle 12c in the final version of the Earth Charter which stresses the need to: “Honor and support the young people of our communities, enabling them to fulfill their essential role in creating sustainable societies.” The launch of the Earth Charter Youth program was inspired by this ethical principle. Today there are two youth representatives on the Earth Charter International Council.

== See also ==
- Earth Day
- Universal Declaration of Human Rights
