= Earth Charter =

United Nations document and declaration

The Earth Charter is an international declaration of fundamental values and principles considered useful by its supporters for building a just, sustainable, and peaceful global society in the 21st century. Created by a global consultation process, and endorsed by organizations representing millions of people, the Charter "seeks to inspire in all peoples a sense of global interdependence and shared responsibility for the well-being of the human family, the greater community of life, and future generations." It calls upon humanity to help create a global partnership at a critical juncture in history. The Earth Charter's vision proposes that environmental protection, human rights, equitable human development, and peace are interdependent and indivisible. The Charter attempts to provide a new framework for thinking about and addressing these issues. The Earth Charter Initiative organization exists to promote the Charter.

== History ==
The idea of the Earth Charter originated in 1987, by Maurice Strong and Mikhail Gorbachev as members of The Club of Rome, when the United Nations World Commission on Environment and Development called for a new charter to guide the transition to sustainable development. In 1992, the need for a charter was urged by then-Secretary General Boutros Boutros-Ghali at the Rio de Janeiro Earth Summit, but the time for such a declaration was not believed to be right. The Rio Declaration became the statement of the achievable consensus at that time. In 1994, Strong (Chairman of the Earth Summit) and Gorbachev, working through organizations they each founded (the Earth Council and Green Cross International respectively), restarted the Earth Charter as a civil society initiative, with the help of the government of the Netherlands.

Strong died in November 2015.

"The Ark of Hope was created for a celebration of the Earth Charter held at Shelburne Farms, Vermont on September 9, 2001."

== Drafting ==
The drafting of the text was done during a six-year worldwide consultation process (1994–2000), overseen by the independent Earth Charter Commission, which was convened by Strong and Gorbachev with the purpose of developing a global consensus on values and principles for a sustainable future. The Commission continues to serve as the steward of the Earth Charter text.

One of the members of the Earth Charter Commission and Steering Committee was Steven Clark Rockefeller, who, among other things is professor emeritus of Religion at Middlebury College and an advisory trustee of the Rockefeller Brothers Fund. According to a 2001 interview with Rockefeller, he "chaired the Earth Charter international drafting committee". Other members included Amadou Toumani Touré (Mali), Princess Basma bint Talal (Jordan), Mohamed Sahnoun (Algeria), A. T. Ariyaratne (Sri Lanka), Wakako Hironaka (Japan), Erna Witoelar (Indonesia), Ruud Lubbers (The Netherlands), Federico Mayor (Spain), Mercedes Sosa (Argentina), Leonardo Boff (Brazil), Yolanda Kakabadse (Ecuador), Shridath Ramphal (Guyana), Elizabeth May (Canada), Severn Cullis-Suzuki (Canada), and others.

The final text of the Earth Charter was approved at a meeting of the Earth Charter Commission at the UNESCO headquarters in Paris in March 2000. The official launch was on 29 June 2000 in a ceremony at The Peace Palace in The Hague, Netherlands. Queen Beatrix of the Netherlands attended the ceremony.

== Contents ==
The approximately 2,400 word document is divided into sections (called pillars), which have 16 main principles containing 61 supporting principles. The document opens with a preamble and ends with a conclusion entitled "The Way Forward".

=== Preamble ===
We stand at a critical moment in Earth's history, a time when humanity must choose its future. As the world becomes increasingly interdependent and fragile, the future at once holds great peril and great promise. To move forward we must recognize that in the midst of a magnificent diversity of cultures and life forms we are one human family and one Earth community with a common destiny. We must join together to bring forth a sustainable global society founded on respect for nature, universal human rights, economic justice, and a culture of peace. Towards this end, it is imperative that we, the peoples of Earth, declare our responsibility to one another, to the greater community of life, and to future generations.

=== Principles ===
The four pillars and sixteen principles of the Earth Charter are:

I. Respect and Care for the Community of Life

1. Respect Earth and life in all its diversity.
2. Care for the community of life with understanding, compassion and love.
3. Build democratic societies that are just, participatory, sustainable and peaceful.
4. Secure Earth's bounty and beauty for present and future generations.

II. Ecological Integrity

5. Protect and restore the integrity of Earth's ecological systems, with special concern for biological diversity and the natural processes that sustain life.
6. Prevent harm as the best method of environmental protection and, when knowledge is limited, apply a precautionary approach.
7. Adopt patterns of production, consumption and reproduction that safeguard Earth's regenerative capacities, human rights and community well-being.
8. Advance the study of ecological sustainability and promote the open exchange and wide application of the knowledge acquired.

III. Social and Economic Justice

9. Eradicate poverty as an ethical, social and environmental imperative.
10. Ensure that economic activities and institutions at all levels promote human development in an equitable and sustainable manner.
11. Affirm gender equality and equity as prerequisites to sustainable development and ensure universal access to education, health care and economic opportunity.
12. Uphold the right of all, without discrimination, to a natural and social environment supportive of human dignity, bodily health and spiritual well-being, with special attention to the rights of indigenous peoples and minorities.

IV. Democracy, Nonviolence, and Peace

13. Strengthen democratic institutions at all levels, and provide transparency and accountability in governance, inclusive participation in decision-making, and access to justice.
14. Integrate into formal education and lifelong learning the knowledge, values and skills needed for a sustainable way of life.
15. Treat all living beings with respect and consideration.
16. Promote a culture of tolerance, nonviolence and peace.

== Reaction ==
The Charter has been formally endorsed by organizations such as the UNESCO, over 250 universities around the world, the World Conservation Union of IUCN, the Indian National Capital Territory of Delhi, the 2001 U.S. Conference of Mayors, and dozens of youth organizations.

Various religious groups from a wide range of religions support the Earth Charter. The Soka Gakkai International, representing more millions of Buddhists worldwide, has supported the Earth Charter since its inception. The Unitarian Universalist Association of Congregations representing over 1000 Unitarian Universalist congregations in the United States supports the measure. The official body of the Baháʼí Faith religion reacted by saying "While not officially endorsing the Earth Charter, the Baháʼí International Community considers the effort toward drafting it and activities in support of its essential objectives to be highly commendable, and it will continue to participate in related activities, such as conferences, forums and the like." The World Pantheist Movement, which supports a naturalistic view of religion, endorses the plan. The Leadership Conference of Women Religious, a Catholic organization in the United States approved the measure in 2004. The Episcopal Diocese of Newark (New Jersey), an Episcopalian Christian organization, endorsed the Earth Charter in 2009.

In May 1992, more than 650 representatives of indigenous peoples adopted their own 109-point Indigenous Peoples Earth Charter. Representatives of indigenous peoples also participated in the Earth Charter consultations in 1996. In 2000, the Russian Association of the Indigenous Peoples of the North (RAIPON), representing 31 indigenous peoples living in Siberia and far eastern Russia, formally endorsed the Earth Charter.

Mayor Hsu of Tainan, a city of 750,000 in Taiwan, endorsed the charter in 2007. The cities of Corvallis (Oregon), Berkeley (California), Pickering (Canada) and 21 towns in Vermont have endorsed the measure. Nine other towns in Vermont rejected measures endorsing the Earth Charter.

Engineers Without Borders, an international association whose mission is to help its member groups assist poor communities in their respective countries and around the world, also endorses the Earth Charter. The Green Party of Botswana supports the plan. The African Conservation Foundation describes the Earth Charter movement as a "partner".

In the UK, Bournemouth Borough Council endorsed the Charter in 2008.

Earth Charter International, the organization responsible for promoting the Charter, states in its literature that the Earth Charter is respectful and inclusive of all religious traditions. They say that the Charter itself makes no statements to support claims of intent to supplant any of the world's religions or to create a world government. ECI asserts that the Charter is a statement of common ethical values towards sustainability, that recognizes humanity's shared responsibility to the Earth and to each other.

=== Criticism ===
The Charter has received opposition from several groups. For example, in the United States, members of religious groups, such as the Religious Right have objected to the document on the grounds that it is secular, and espouses socialism, even though it does not; "From time to time critics of the Earth Charter express a concern that it promotes socialism. This reflects a misunderstanding of the nature and purpose of the document. The Earth Charter highlights the importance of social and economic justice, but it does not advocate socialism as a political and economic strategy for achieving it." In addition, some conservatives cite an informal comment by Mikhail Gorbachev that the document is "a kind of Ten Commandments"; and point to the fact that at the 2002 World Summit on Sustainable Development in Johannesburg, South Africa, a copy of the document was placed symbolically in an "Ark of Hope" — an independent project by the American artist Sally Linder.

== See also ==
- Earth Day
- World Oceans Day
- World Water Day
- Universal Declaration of Human Rights
- University for Peace
