= SINAES (Costa Rica) =

The National System for Accreditation of Higher Education (SINAES) (Spanish: Sistema Nacional de Acreditación de la Educación Superior) is a Costa Rican organisation tasked with contributing to the quality of higher education in the country, mainly through evaluating education programmes for accreditation. It was founded in 1999 by an agreement signed by the four largest public universities (UCR, TEC, UNA, and UNED) and the four largest private universities (ULatina, Interamericana, ULACIT, and Veritas) of Costa Rica at the time. As of 2023, SINAES has accredited 254 study programmes at 30 universities.

The accreditation process of SINAES relies on a register of domestic and international experts that have at least 10 years of teaching experience in a discipline, either within Costa Rica or abroad.

SINAES is a member of the International Network for Quality Assurance Agencies in Higher Education (INQAAHE) and the Council for Higher Education Accreditation (CHEA).
