= Ariane de Rothschild Art Prize =

Contemporary art award

The Ariane de Rothschild art prize, dedicated to contemporary art, was established in 2003. The exhibition is held in Lisbon or Brussels. The award focuses on painting, but with works based on traditional forms of painting, the competition accepts works whose theme, technique or genre may include photography, sculpture and video. A jury selected the artists based on the originality of their works, their artistic merit and other criteria deemed relevant by the jury. The price is different from other competitions in that it is a non-monetary prize in the form of an all expenses paid 6 months artists-in-resident scholarship to the Slade School of Fine Arts in London.

== Winners ==
- 2008
  - First prize: Mekhitar Garabedian
  - Nominated artists: Stephan Balleux, Charlotte Baudry, Jean-Baptiste Bernadet, Sofia Boubolis, Mekhitar Garabedian, Adam Leech, Jean-Luc Moerman, David Neirings, Benoit Platéus, Fabrice Samyn, Ante Timmermans, Leon Vranken, Freek Wambacq
- 2007
  - Special Distinction: Tiago Margaça, Sem Título (Untitled)
  - First prize: Susana Mendes Silva, Phantasia
  - Second prize: José Marques Baptista, Sem Título (Untitled)
  - Third Prize: David Rosado, Urban Talk in a Fundamental Relation
- 2005
  - First prize: Manuel Caeiro, The Last Room # 2
  - Second Prize: Paula Sousa Cardoso, Everyday Lifestyle, Everyday Life Still
  - Third prize: Carla Cabanas, Lagoa
  - Fourth Prize: Ricardo Frutuoso, Os eternos fitavam-lhe os bosques imensos (The immortal eyes on huge wooden)
  - Fifth Prize (tie): Pedro Barateiro, Monument (Monument)
  - Fifth Prize (tie): Jorge Nesbitt, Sem Título (Untitled)
- 2003
  - First prize (tie): Bárbara Assis Pacheco, Sem Título (Untitled)
  - First prize (tie): ex aequo: António José Almeida Pereira, Looks Up When hear a plane pass by or when bird shit falls on the forehead
  - Third prize: Joao Vilhena, Bathtub # 211
  - First Honorable Mention: João Eduardo de Vilhena, A mala matriz (If Matrix)
  - First Honorable Mention: José Eduardo Marques Baptista, Screen Saver

== Jury in 2008 ==
- Ariane de Rothschild
- John Aiken (Slade School of Fine Art, London)
- Marc Moles le Bailly (Banque privée Edmond de Rothschild Europe)
- Adam Budak (Kunsthaus Manifesta 7 & Graz)
- Philippe Van Cauteren (SMAK, Ghent)
- Laura Hoptman (New Museum, New York)
