= Rosebell Kagumire =

Ugandan journalist

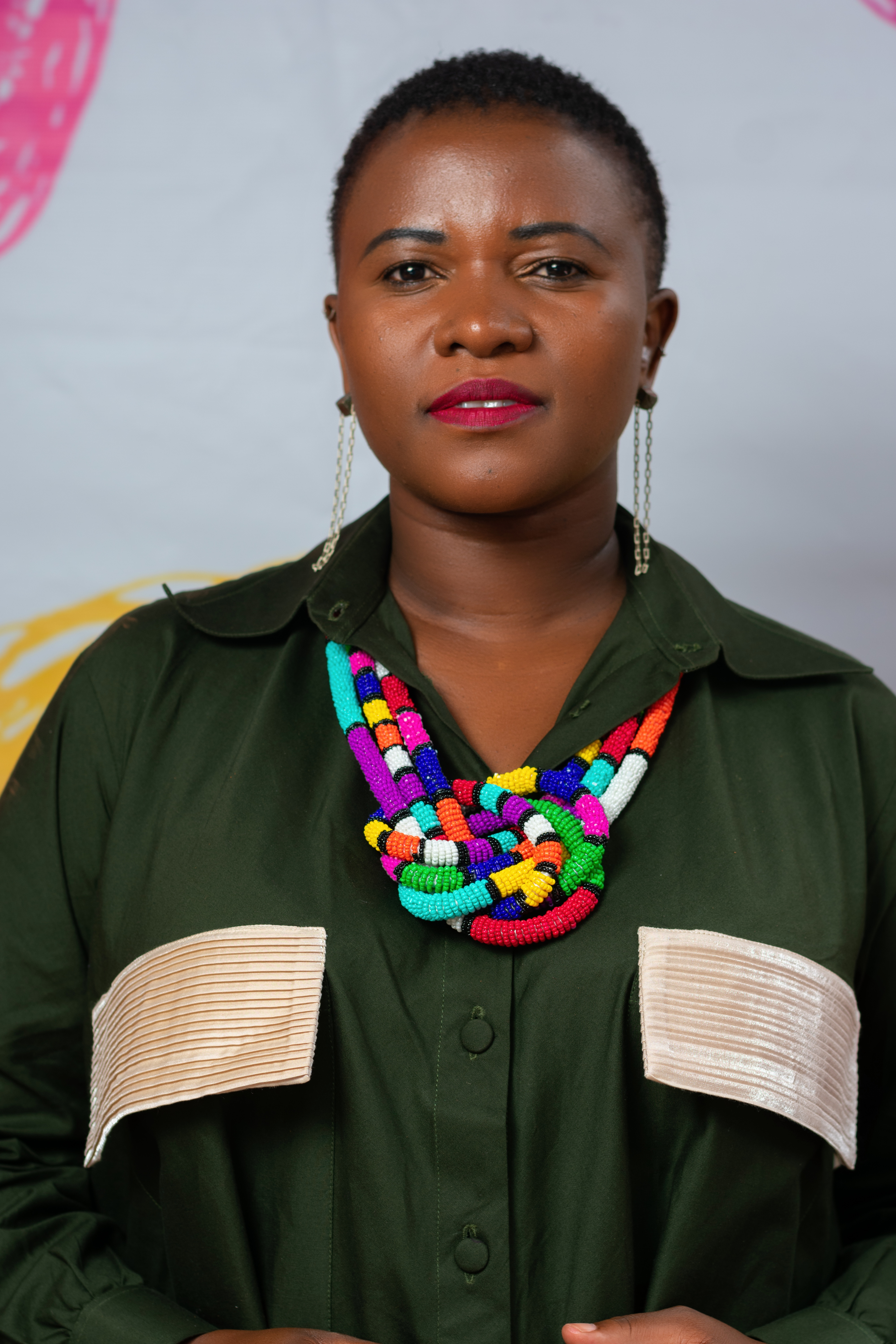
- Rosebell Kagumire in 2022, at the Forum on Internet Freedom in Africa (FIFAfrica22).
- Born: April 23, 1983 (age 43)
- Education: Makerere University; University for Peace
- Occupation: Journalist
- Known for: African feminism, peace
- Awards: Anna Guèye Award (2018)
- Website: rosebellkagumire.com

Rosebell Kagumire is a Ugandan journalist and activist. She is an editor for an African feminist blog and writes for international media like The Guardian and Al Jazeera.

== Background and education ==
Rosebell Kagumire grew up in Bushenyi, a village in Southwestern Uganda.

Kagumire went to Bwerayangi Girls Secondary School for her secondary school education. She then studied Mass Communication at Makerere University and graduated in 2005. She obtained a certificate in Global Leadership and Public Policy for the 21st Century from the Harvard Kennedy School and a certificate in Nonviolent Conflict at the Fletcher School of Law and Diplomacy, Tufts University.

Kagumire holds a Master of Arts in Media, Peace and Conflict Studies from the United Nations-mandated University for Peace in Costa Rica. While there she was taught by Mona Eltahawy, an Egyptian journalist.

== Career ==
Rosebell Kagumire worked as a reporter for Daily Monitor, Uganda Radio Network and NTV Uganda. While at NTV Uganda, she was in filming, script writing and news story production. Rosebell was a Uganda contributor for the Institute for War and Peace Reporting (IWPR). She was the communications officer for Women's Link Worldwide.

Rosebell Kagumire is the curator and editor of African Feminism- AF, an online platform that documents experiences of African women. She also serves as the Collaborator Global Reporting Centre and also as a freelance editor and writer whose work appears in international media such as The Guardian, Al Jazeera and Quartz. Rosebell Kagumire is Volunteering Author for the Global Voices. She is a member of the advisory council of the Europe-based Centre for Feminist Foreign Policy, a research, advocacy, and consulting organization dedicated to promoting feminist foreign policy across the globe.

== Awards ==
Rosebell Kagumire was honored with the Anna Guèye 2018 award for her advocacy for digital democracy, justice and equality by Africtivistes, a network of African activists. The World Economic Forum recognized her as one of the Young Global Leaders under the age of 40 in 2013 for her advocacy on social justice issues. In 2012 she was named as one of Foreign Policy Magazine's “100 women to follow on Twitter”. Her blog won the Waxal – Blogging Africa Awards, first African journalist blogging awards hosted by Panos Institute of West Africa in 2009. Kagumire's reporting on peace and security was recognized at the 2008 Ugandan Investigative Journalism Awards hosted by Makerere University Department of Mass Communication.

== See also ==
- Kony 2012
- African feminism
