= TechChange =

US social enterprise

- Formation: 2010
- Founder: Nick Martin
- Purpose: Online learning, international development
- Headquarters: Washington, D.C., US
- Method: Distance learning, capacity building
- President & CEO: Nick Martin
- Website: www.techchange.org

TechChange is an American online learning platform, founded by Nick Martin in 2010 and based in Washington, DC.

== Overview ==
TechChange provides online certificate courses on topics including international development, social entrepreneurship and the applications of social media. It also hosts in-person workshops. The company partners with governmental and nongovernmental organizations such as USAID, US State Department, World Bank and United Nations Foundation to deliver online educational content.
