= 2020 NBA Bubble =

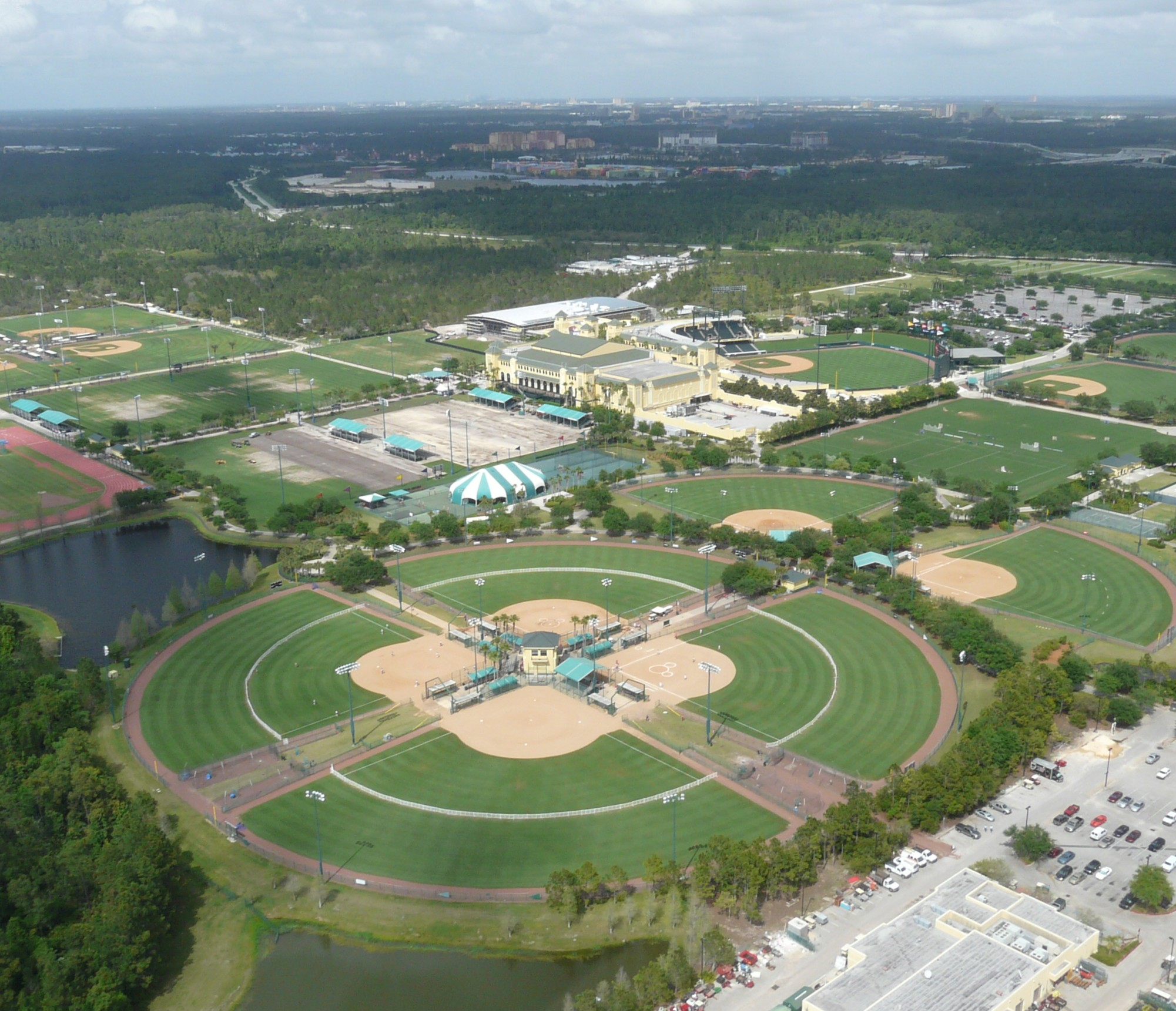
- An aerial view of the ESPN Wide World of Sports Complex at Walt Disney World, the site of the NBA Bubble games
- League: National Basketball Association
- Sport: Basketball
- Duration: Exhibition scrimmages: July 22–28, 2020; Regular season "seeding" games: July 30 – August 14, 2020; Play-in tournament: August 15, 2020; NBA playoffs: August 17 – September 30, 2020; NBA Finals: September 30 – October 11, 2020
- Teams: 22
- Total attendance: 0 (held behind closed doors)
- TV partner(s): ABC, TNT, ESPN, NBA TV

Regular season seeding games
- Top seed: Milwaukee Bucks (East); Los Angeles Lakers (West)
- Season MVP: Damian Lillard (Portland Trail Blazers)
- Top scorer: James Harden (Houston Rockets)

Playoffs
- Eastern champions: Miami Heat
- Eastern runners-up: Boston Celtics
- Western champions: Los Angeles Lakers
- Western runners-up: Denver Nuggets

Finals
- Champions: Los Angeles Lakers
- Runners-up: Miami Heat
- Finals MVP: LeBron James

NBA seasons
- ← 2018–19 2020–21 →

The 2020 NBA Bubble was the bio-secure bubble at Walt Disney World in Bay Lake, Florida, near Orlando, that was created by the National Basketball Association (NBA) to protect its players from the COVID-19 pandemic during the final eight games of the 2019–20 regular season and throughout the 2020 NBA playoffs. 22 out of the 30 NBA teams were invited to participate (the other eight had been eliminated from playoff contention) with games being held behind closed doors at the ESPN Wide World of Sports Complex and the teams staying at makeshift Disney World hotels.

The bubble was a $190 million investment by the NBA to protect its 2019–20 season, which was initially suspended by the pandemic on March 11, 2020. The bubble recouped an estimated $1.5 billion in revenue. In June, the NBA approved the plan to resume the season at Disney World, inviting the 22 teams that were within six games of a playoff spot when the season was suspended. The plan initially received a mixed reaction from players and coaches.

After playing three exhibition scrimmages inside the bubble in late July, the invited teams played eight additional regular season games to determine playoff seeding. The playoffs began on August 17, and the NBA Finals began on September 30. During the playoffs, there were additional delays to the season prompted by activism related to the shooting of Jacob Blake. The season ended on October 11 when the Los Angeles Lakers defeated the Miami Heat in six games. From the start of the resumed 2019–20 season until the end of the NBA Finals, the NBA ended with no recorded cases of COVID-19 for the teams participating in the bubble.

The NBA Bubble in some form has been made into a contingency plan for the NBA in future pandemics or major disease outbreaks.

== Suspension of the season ==
On March 11, 2020, the NBA announced the suspension of the 2019–20 season following Utah Jazz center Rudy Gobert testing positive for COVID-19 hours before the Jazz road game against the Oklahoma City Thunder. On June 4, the NBA Board of Governors approved 29–1 (with the lone outlier being the Portland Trail Blazers) resuming the 2019–20 season in Orlando, Florida at Walt Disney World, after prior consideration of Las Vegas and Houston as potential spots. On June 5, the National Basketball Players Association (NBPA) approved negotiations with the NBA.

Under normal circumstances, the New York Knicks' home arena Madison Square Garden would have lost its New York City tax exemptions as soon as the team started playing home games in the bubble, but the tax agreement includes an act of God clause.

== Resumption of the season ==
On June 17, 2020, the NBA released a medical protocol to be used during the season restart in the bubble to ensure the health and safety of players, coaches, officials, and staff. This protocol included regular testing for COVID-19 prior to and throughout the season restart, wearing a face covering or mask, and physical distancing to prevent an outbreak of COVID-19 from occurring. Also, players and coaches deemed "high-risk individuals" by their team, or players who had already suffered season-ending injuries prior to season suspension, would not be permitted to play and would also not lose any salary. Any player medically cleared could also decline to participate but would lose their corresponding paychecks.

The protocol outlined six phases to ensure a smooth transition into the bubble and a successful end to the season:

- Phase 1 of the plan ran from June 16 to 22, consisting of players traveling back to the home cities of their respective teams.
- In Phase 2 from June 23 to 30, COVID-19 tests began being administered to players every other day.
- In Phase 3 from July 1 to 11, mandatory individual workouts were conducted at team facilities, but group workouts were prohibited.
- Phase 4 was from July 7 to 21, consisting of the teams traveling to Disney World and conducting practices. Any player who tested positive in the previous phases could not travel until being medically cleared to do so. Once teams arrived in Orlando, players and staff were isolated in their rooms, required to pass two polymerase chain reaction (PCR) tests 24 hours apart before being let out of this quarantine. Players and staff were regularly tested for COVID-19 afterwards throughout the season. A player who tested positive was isolated and re-tested in case of a false positive; if COVID-19 was definitely confirmed, he was quarantined for at least 14 days to recover. Players and staff were not permitted into another's room, nor were they able to socialize with players on other teams staying at a different hotel building. They had access to food and recreational activities within their hotel's bubble, but they had to wear masks indoors except when eating. Anybody who left the bubble without prior approval had to be quarantined for at least 10 days.
- During Phase 5 from July 22 to 29, teams played three scrimmages against the other teams staying at the same hotel.
- During Phase 6, as the regular season seeding games and playoffs were underway and teams began to be eliminated from contention, players and staff on those clubs had to pass one final COVID-19 test before they could leave Disney World.

With fans not being permitted to attend in person, the NBA installed 17-foot (5.2 m) screens on the courts to display multimedia content and a mosaic of virtual spectators powered by Microsoft Teams.

On July 30, the season resumed as planned, with the Utah Jazz defeating the New Orleans Pelicans and the Los Angeles Lakers defeating the Los Angeles Clippers. The games were played across three Disney venues at the ESPN Wide World of Sports Complex: the HP Field House, the Visa Athletic Center and The AdventHealth Arena.

The NBA launched an advertising campaign, "It's a Whole New Game", to promote the resumption.

== Proposal for a second bubble ==
A second bubble to be hosted in Chicago was briefly considered by the NBA for the eight teams not invited to the bubble so they would also have some sort of competitive play instead of merely sitting out the entire time from March 2020 to the start of the 2020–21 season in December, referred to as the "Delete Eight", but ultimately the plan fell through. Although it was reported that the eight teams would have an opportunity to join the NBA Bubble in Orlando following the playoffs, this also did not work out.

On August 20, 2020, the NBA and NBPA announced an agreement where the eight teams could have voluntary group workouts at their respective practice facilities from September 4 to October 10.

== Rules ==
The NBA produced a rule book of more than 100 pages to protect its players in an attempt to salvage the remainder of the season. Rules included isolation periods, testing requirements, and the potential for financial penalties. Any players subject to isolation periods when a game was scheduled had to forego participating in the game to complete their isolation. The NBA had a hotline allowing people to anonymously report players who broke the rules of the bubble, which players referred to as the "snitch hotline". Players always had to wear masks, with eating and exercise being exceptions. Additionally, staff working at these facilities had to wear masks and gloves at all times, though the staff were not required to quarantine. Players were not required to join the bubble, and at least ten players declined to join their teams, including Brooklyn Nets guard Kyrie Irving and Los Angeles Lakers guard Avery Bradley. Irving declined to participate due to his desire to focus on ongoing social justice issues, while Bradley opted out due to his six-year-old son battling an respiratory illness. Despite his withdrawal, Bradley still was awarded an NBA championship ring due to the Lakers winning the title. Guests were not allowed, and all food was prepared within the bubble. Only four players were cited for violating the rules of the bubble: Lou Williams, Richaun Holmes, Bruno Caboclo, and Danuel House.

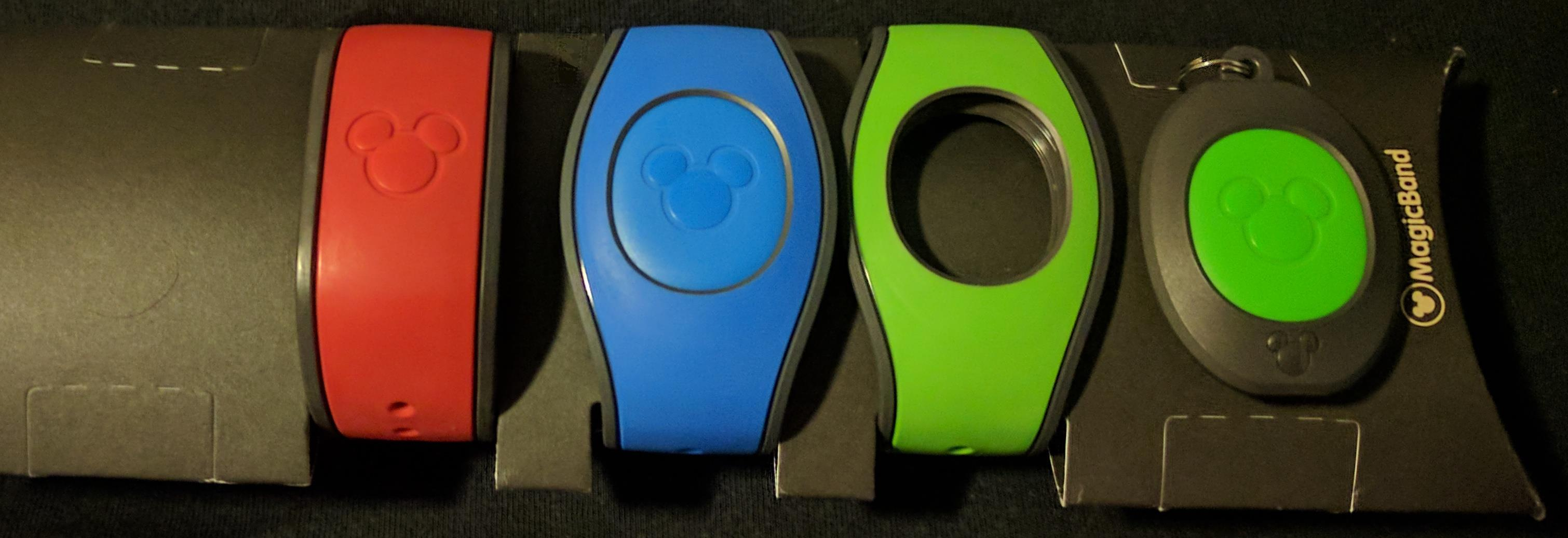
Example of Disney MagicBands

Players were allowed to use many of the Disney facilities, such as pools, golf courses, bicycles, gaming areas, barbers, bowling, ping pong, and spa services. RFID-enabled MagicBands, which are normally used at Walt Disney World for hotel keys and other admissions and personalization features at theme park attractions, were utilized as a check-in and contact tracing mechanism, and could be used to restrict access to practice facilities and courts if one had not completed a daily health monitoring review.

== Impact on media production ==
National broadcaster ESPN, in partnership with the NBA and the league's other broadcaster TNT, set up a 100-plus camera infrastructure surrounding the three arenas being used at the ESPN Wide World of Sports Complex. The national broadcasts also had additional cameras to provide new angles, including a "rail cam" at the side of the court, and free-throw line cameras. ESPN and Turner production staff and some on-air hosts were present inside the "bubble". ESPN and Turner had many announcers, play-by-play, color, and other commentators physically present to call bubble games. For regional broadcasters, live feeds were fed to their respective studio for calling and broadcasting.

While most ESPN and Turner announcers were in the bubble, 79-year-old Turner play-by-play commentator Marv Albert and 87-year-old ESPN color commentator Hubie Brown declined to participate citing their advanced ages as potential risks for severe illness from COVID-19.

== Player mindset during the Bubble ==
Several players, including LeBron James and Anthony Davis, had some psychological problems due to not having family in the bubble. There was a total of 93 days in the bubble, and star LeBron James struggled to enjoy the off court activities in the bubble due to lack of family life. He quotes that viewers "don't quite understand the mindset" you had to be in to truly understand what happened in the Bubble.

However, several players said they enjoyed the bubble lifestyle. Oklahoma City Thunder center Steven Adams was quoted saying that it was impossible to complain when it was in a "resort." Devin Booker is another player who seemed to respond positively to the bubble lifestyle. Going into it, the superstar's team was projected to lose most of their games. However, led by Booker, the Phoenix Suns went a perfect 8–0 in the bubble.

== Effectiveness ==
The bubble proved to be extremely effective at preventing the spread of COVID-19. Leading up to the resumption of play on July 30, there were two consecutive weeks of zero players testing positive for COVID-19.

This streak was continued after play resumed, with five consecutive weeks of zero players testing positive for COVID-19 as of August 19. Starting on August 31, players were allowed to pay for one guest room. Family or non-family members with proof of a longstanding relationship with the player could stay in the room and quarantine upon arrival for one week.

On October 11, the season concluded with zero cases of COVID-19 in the bubble for its entire duration.

== Reaction ==
The controversial decision by the NBA to enact bubble play had initially received mixed reaction from its players and coaches, with some players referring to it as a prison sentence. Many players refused to participate, which forced certain teams to field lineups that were second-rate. Other players complained about the food, with Philadelphia 76ers center Joel Embiid showing his meal and said that he "definitely" lost 50 pounds (23 kg), as a reference to fan gripe regarding his weight affecting his on-court performance. After arriving in the bubble, Orlando Magic forward Aaron Gordon said it felt "strange", while Utah Jazz guard Mike Conley Jr. described the feeling as "surreal". Near the end of the regular season, NBA Commissioner Adam Silver stated that the bubble was "better than what we had envisioned".

Miami Heat forward Jimmy Butler used the opportunity to start a coffee shop in the bubble, where he charged $20 per cup. Butler was also one of few players to make the decision not to allow his family to visit in the bubble, stating that his time in the bubble was a "business trip".

Several players, including Los Angeles Clippers forward Paul George, also commented on how being in the bubble affected their mental health.

== Schedule ==
The bubble followed the schedule below:

Stage/Round	Dates
Training camp	July 9–11
Scrimmages	July 22–28
Seeding games (regular season)	July 30 – August 14
Play-in tournaments (if necessary)	August 15–16
NBA Playoffs First Round	August 17 – September 2^{1}
Family and guests of teams arrive	August 31
Conference Semifinals	August 31 – September 13
Conference Finals	September 15–28
NBA Finals	September 30 – October 11

^{1} Originally August 17–30, but the boycott delay meant that the last first-round game, Game 7 between Oklahoma City and Houston, was played on September 2.

== Venues and bases ==
In addition to the three venues in the ESPN Wide World of Sports Complex which were hosting games, three official Disney resorts were chosen to host the teams, with the teams being arranged based on their respective records prior to entering the bubble. Although teams competed in the same campus, bubble games maintained the home and away structure of a traditional NBA season. Game feeds had been augmented in real-time to insert graphics on the court's floor such as the "home" team's logo, their real venue's name, and advertising, similar to National Football League (NFL) broadcast's 1st & Ten line.

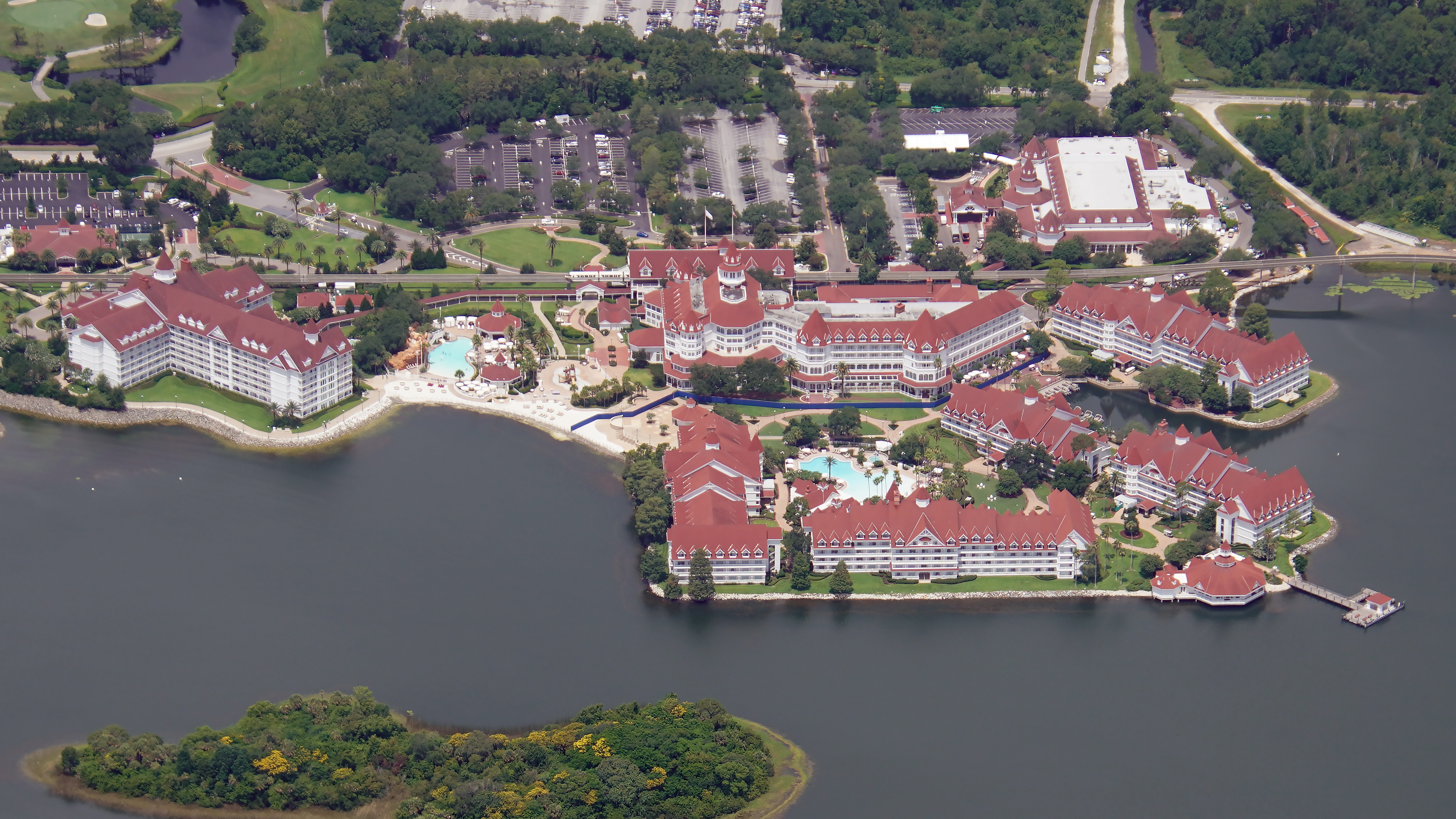
Aerial photo of the blue NBA Bubble fence through Disney's Grand Floridian. This fence isolated player lodging.

Location	Type	Area	Role
AdventHealth Arena	Venue	ESPN Wide World of Sports Complex	Primary court, used for nationally televised games, including all games from the conference finals onward.
HP Field House	Venue	ESPN Wide World of Sports Complex	Secondary court, to be used until the conference finals.
Visa Athletic Center	Venue	ESPN Wide World of Sports Complex	Tertiary court, used primarily for non-national games.
Disney's Grand Floridian Resort and Spa	Base	Magic Kingdom Resort Area	Hosted the Orlando Magic, Oklahoma City Thunder, Philadelphia 76ers, Houston Rockets, Indiana Pacers, Dallas Mavericks, Brooklyn Nets, and Memphis Grizzlies. The Portland Trail Blazers also moved into the Grand Floridian after qualifying for the NBA playoffs.
Disney's Yacht Club Resort	Base	Epcot Resort Area	Hosted the Portland Trail Blazers, Sacramento Kings, New Orleans Pelicans, San Antonio Spurs, Phoenix Suns, and Washington Wizards.
Disney's Coronado Springs Resort	Base/Practice Facility	Animal Kingdom Resort Area	Hosted the Los Angeles Lakers, Milwaukee Bucks, Toronto Raptors, Los Angeles Clippers, Boston Celtics, Denver Nuggets, Utah Jazz, and Miami Heat at the Gran Destino Tower. All teams' respective practice courts were also located inside the convention center.

== Teams/results ==
There were 22 teams that were invited to the bubble, the 16 teams in playoff position and the six teams within six games of playoff position, with their seeding and overall records.

=== Seeding ===
==== Eastern Conference ====
#	Team	Overall					Seeding		
#	Team	W	L	PCT	GB	GP	W	L	PCT
1	z – Milwaukee Bucks*	56	17	.767	–	73	3	5	.375
2	y – Toronto Raptors*	53	19	.736	2.5	72	7	1	.875
3	x – Boston Celtics	48	24	.667	7.5	72	5	3	.625
4	x – Indiana Pacers	45	28	.616	11.0	73	6	2	.750
5	y – Miami Heat*	44	29	.603	12.0	73	3	5	.375
6	x – Philadelphia 76ers	43	30	.589	13.0	73	4	4	.500
7	x – Brooklyn Nets	35	37	.486	20.5	72	5	3	.625
8	x – Orlando Magic	33	40	.452	23.0	73	3	5	.375
9	o – Washington Wizards	25	47	.347	30.5	72	1	7	.125

==== Western Conference ====
#	Team	Overall					Seeding		
#	Team	W	L	PCT	GB	GP	W	L	PCT
1	c – Los Angeles Lakers*	52	19	.732	–	71	3	5	.375
2	x – Los Angeles Clippers	49	23	.681	3.5	72	5	3	.625
3	y – Denver Nuggets*	46	27	.630	7.0	73	3	5	.375
4	y – Houston Rockets*	44	28	.611	8.5	72	4	4	.500
5	x – Oklahoma City Thunder	44	28	.611	8.5	72	4	4	.500
6	x – Utah Jazz	44	28	.611	8.5	72	3	5	.375
7	x – Dallas Mavericks	43	32	.573	11.0	75	3	5	.375
8	x – Portland Trail Blazers	35	39	.473	18.5	74	6	2	.750
9	p – Memphis Grizzlies	34	39	.466	19.0	73	2	6	.250
10	o – Phoenix Suns	34	39	.466	19.0	73	8	0	1.000
11	o – San Antonio Spurs	32	39	.451	20.0	71	5	3	.625
12	o – Sacramento Kings	31	41	.431	21.5	72	3	5	.375
13	o – New Orleans Pelicans	30	42	.416	22.5	72	2	6	.250

Notes

- z – Clinched best record in the NBA
- c – Clinched best record in the conference
- y – Clinched division title
- x – Clinched playoff spot
- p – Clinched play-in spot
- o – Eliminated from playoff contention
- * – Division champion

=== Play-in ===
==== Western Conference: (8) Portland Trail Blazers vs. (9) Memphis Grizzlies ====
As the eighth seed, Portland had to win one game, while Memphis had to win two.

ABC

August 15
2:30pm

Box score

Memphis Grizzlies 122, Portland Trail Blazers 126
Scoring by quarter: 19–31, 33–27, 42–31, 28–37
Pts: Ja Morant 35; Rebs: Jonas Valančiūnas 17; Asts: Kyle Anderson 9	Pts: Damian Lillard 31; Rebs: Jusuf Nurkić 21; Asts: Damian Lillard 10
Portland wins series 1–0

HP Field House, ESPN Wide World of Sports Complex, Walt Disney World, Bay Lake, Florida
Referees: James Capers, Pat Fraher, and Tony Brown

=== Playoffs ===
First round	Conference semifinals
E1	Milwaukee*	4
E8	Orlando	1
E1	Milwaukee*	1
E5	Miami*	4
E4	Indiana	0
E5	Miami*	4
Eastern Conference
E3	Boston	4
E6	Philadelphia	0
E3	Boston	4
E2	Toronto*	3
E2	Toronto*	4
E7	Brooklyn	0
W1	LA Lakers*	4
W8	Portland	1
W1	LA Lakers*	4
W4	Houston*	1
W4	Houston*	4
W5	Oklahoma City	3
Western Conference
W3	Denver*	4
W6	Utah	3
W3	Denver*	4
W2	LA Clippers	3
W2	LA Clippers	4
W7	Dallas	2

Conference finals
E5	Miami*	4
E3	Boston	2
W1	LA Lakers*	4
W3	Denver*	1

NBA Finals
E5	Miami*	2
W1	LA Lakers*	4

- * Division winner
- Bold Series winner

== Seeding Games awards ==
Awards for play during the seeding games were also announced, with Damian Lillard named Player of the Seeding Games after averaging 37.6 points per game.

Seeding Games awards
Award	Recipient(s)
Seeding Games MVP	Damian Lillard (Portland Trail Blazers)
Coach of the Seeding Games	Monty Williams (Phoenix Suns)
All-Seeding Games First Team	Devin Booker (Phoenix Suns)
All-Seeding Games First Team	Luka Dončić (Dallas Mavericks)
All-Seeding Games First Team	James Harden (Houston Rockets)
All-Seeding Games First Team	Damian Lillard (Portland Trail Blazers)
All-Seeding Games First Team	T. J. Warren (Indiana Pacers)
All-Seeding Games Second Team	Giannis Antetokounmpo (Milwaukee Bucks)
All-Seeding Games Second Team	Kawhi Leonard (Los Angeles Clippers)
All-Seeding Games Second Team	Caris LeVert (Brooklyn Nets)
All-Seeding Games Second Team	Michael Porter Jr. (Denver Nuggets)
All-Seeding Games Second Team	Kristaps Porziņģis (Dallas Mavericks)

== Activism ==
With the George Floyd protests ongoing, the NBA, the NBPA, and the teams worked together to use the bubble as a platform for the Black Lives Matter movement. During warmups and while sitting on the bench, players wore T-shirts with large print and the text "Black Lives Matter". This phrase was also painted in large font on all official basketball courts being used for gameplay. Additionally, players were allowed the option to replace the names on the backs of their jerseys with a meaningful statement of their choice in support of the Black Lives Matter movement. The national anthem was pre-recorded in advance exclusively by African American artists. Jonathan Isaac was the first player to stand during the national anthem and elect not to wear a Black Lives Matter warm-up shirt, citing religious reasons for his decision. Other players respected his decision, even if they disagreed with him. Miami Heat player Meyers Leonard also chose to stand with his hand over his heart. His reasoning came down to his support for the military. San Antonio Spurs coaches Gregg Popovich, an outspoken supporter of Black Lives Matter, and Becky Hammon also chose to stand for their own reasons. Sean Roberts, a Republican member of the Oklahoma House of Representatives, threatened to pull tax breaks for the Oklahoma City Thunder if they kneeled. All of the players and coaches from both the Thunder and opposing Utah Jazz kneeled anyway.

In response to the shooting of Jacob Blake in Kenosha, Wisconsin, the Milwaukee Bucks boycotted Game 5 of their series against the Orlando Magic on August 26. Later that day, the NBA announced that in light of the Bucks' decision, all games for the day were postponed. The NBPA held a meeting to address the situation regarding the boycott, where the Los Angeles Lakers and Los Angeles Clippers voted not to play the remainder of the season. Every other team, however, voted to continue playing. On August 27, the players agreed to continue the playoffs, but all games scheduled for that night were postponed as well. The playoffs were resumed on August 29, after the NBA and NBPA agreed on three commitments for social justice reform efforts, including opening up arenas as voting centers in the upcoming election.

== Legacy ==
With the success of the 2020 NBA Bubble, the NBA decided to implement the same measures utilized there into the 2020–21 NBA G League season, dubbed as the "2021 G League Bubble" by media outlets like ESPN. In the G League Bubble setting, it was agreed that only 17 out of the 28 NBA G League's teams that were officially eligible for that season, as well as the newly created NBA G League Ignite (a farm team that was not initially planned to compete in the playoffs that season due to their status as a developmental team before later being allowed in for that season's playoffs due to the new format set up for their bubble setting), would compete throughout February and March 2021 in a truncated season at the ESPN Wide World of Sports Complex, similar to the NBA Bubble. However, their regular season gave each team 15 total games between February 10 and March 6, with no divisional or conference alignments at all during that season, before the eight best regular season teams competed in a single-elimination playoff from March 8 until the championship game on March 11. The single elimination tournament ended with the #6 seed Lakeland Magic (affiliate team of the Orlando Magic) winning the G League Championship by a final score of 97–78 over the #4 seed Delaware Blue Coats (affiliate team of the Philadelphia 76ers). Devin Cannady was given the NBA G League Finals Most Valuable Player Award after the championship game concluded that day.

For the 2020–21 NBA season, the NBA hoped to prevent spread of the COVID-19 virus by having their teams limit the number of fans allowed to enter their stadiums to watch their games live, with a majority of them deciding to play behind closed doors as an extra precaution. However, throughout January 2021, the number of games suspended for the 2020–21 season dramatically increased from only one game in 2020 to 22 by the end of January. With the NBA creating more rules and regulations to combat even greater spread of the virus during that time, players and coaches also supported looking into a similar setting to their 2020 Bubble into the second half of their season in 2021. These discussions for a similar setting were kept in mind for that season in the event the rate of infection worsened later on in the season, even with greater COVID-19 vaccine usage for the general population in mind. However, the NBA encouraged players, coaches, and other team personnel to start getting their vaccine shots against the virus during the second half of the season.

The NBA bubble became a contingency plan for the NBA in the event for a future pandemic or other major disease outbreaks. The NBA bubble has influenced the International Olympic Committee to develop biosecurity protocols for the 2020 Summer Olympics (which was delayed to 2021) in Tokyo.

On March 24, 2021, HBO and Oh Dip!!! Productions released a documentary on HBO Max called The Day Sports Stood Still. Around the start of the 2019–20 NBA season suspension, Chris Paul called movie producer Brian Grazer about the season's suspension, alongside every other major sports league that was set to play around this time, making for an interesting documentary. In addition to covering the season's suspension period and how it affected some of the players that had been involved with the COVID-19 pandemic earlier on, it also covered how the shooting of Breonna Taylor, and the murders of Ahmaud Arbery and George Floyd affected the NBA's planning for the 2020 NBA Bubble, the potential risks it could have held for the players and everyone else involved there, and how the shooting of Jacob Blake continued affecting the results of the bubble during the 2020 NBA playoffs.

== See also ==
- Support bubble
- WWE ThunderDome, a similar mechanism used by the wrestling company WWE
- MLS is Back Tournament, a similar concept for Major League Soccer also held at the ESPN Wide World of Sports Complex
- 2020 Major League Baseball season, a shortened baseball regular season with no fans in attendance
  - 2020 Major League Baseball postseason, played at neutral sites with most games barring attendance
- 2020 Stanley Cup playoffs, played at neutral sites in Canada with no fans in attendance
