= Seven Dwarfs Mine Train =

Attraction at Disney parks

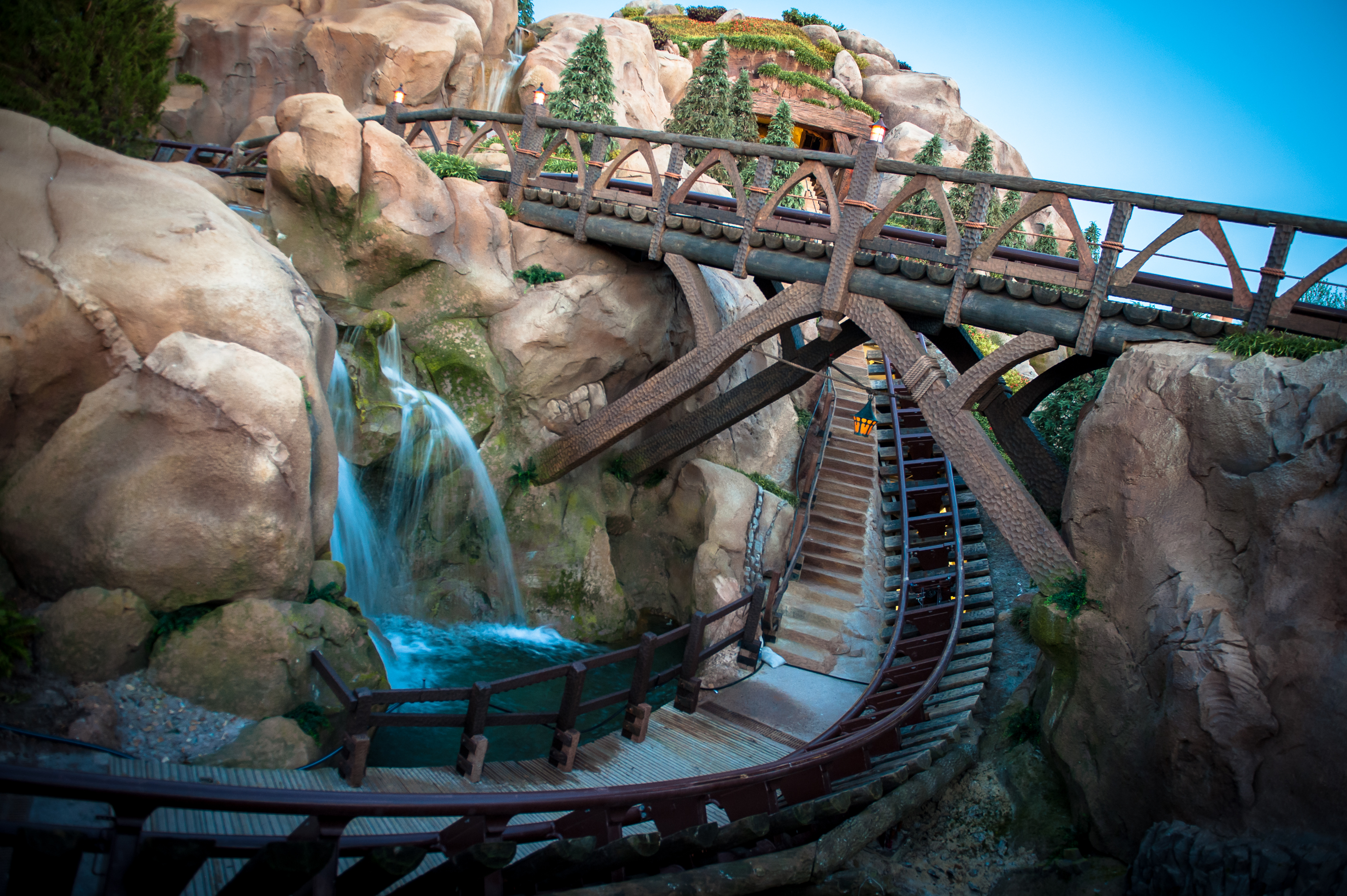
- The largest drop and bridge of the Seven Dwarfs Mine Train at Magic Kingdom

Magic Kingdom
- Park section: Fantasyland (Enchanted Forest)
- Coordinates: 28°25′14″N 81°34′48″W
- Status: Operating
- Opening date: May 28, 2014; 12 years ago
- Replaced: 20,000 Leagues Under the Sea: Submarine Voyage (1971–1994); Ariel's Grotto (1996-2004); Pooh's Playful Spot (2005-2010)
- Website: Official website
- Lightning Lane Single Pass Available
- Seven Dwarfs Mine Train at Magic Kingdom at RCDB

Shanghai Disneyland
- Name: Seven Dwarfs Mine Train 七个小矮人矿山车
- Park section: Fantasyland
- Coordinates: 31.147459°N 121.655519°E
- Status: Operating
- Soft opening date: May 7, 2016
- Opening date: June 16, 2016
- Website: Official website
- Disney Premier Access available
- Single rider line available
- Seven Dwarfs Mine Train 七个小矮人矿山车 at Shanghai Disneyland at RCDB

General statistics
- Type: Steel – Mine Train
- Manufacturer: Vekoma
- Designer: Walt Disney Imagineering
- Model: Custom
- Track layout: MK700 "J"
- Lift/launch system: Two chain lift hills
- Drop: 39 ft (12 m)
- Length: 2,000 ft (610 m)
- Speed: 34 mph (55 km/h)
- Inversions: 0
- Duration: 2:50
- Height restriction: 38 in (97 cm)
- Trains: 5 trains with 5 cars; riders arranged 2 across in 2 rows for a total of 20 riders per train
- Theme: Snow White and the Seven Dwarfs
- Must transfer from wheelchair

Seven Dwarfs Mine Train is a steel mine train roller coaster located at Magic Kingdom and Shanghai Disneyland. Manufactured by Vekoma, the roller coaster is situated in the Fantasyland sections of both parks. The Magic Kingdom version opened to the public on May 28, 2014, as part of a major park expansion called New Fantasyland as part of the section of Enchanted Forest, while the Shanghai version opened on June 16, 2016. The ride is themed to Walt Disney's 1937 film Snow White and the Seven Dwarfs, the first full-length, traditionally-animated feature film.

== History ==
The Fantasyland section of the Magic Kingdom underwent a large expansion and renovation from March 2010 through May 2014. As part of the expansion, the Magic Kingdom's original Snow White attraction, Snow White's Scary Adventures, was permanently closed on May 31, 2012, and replaced with Princess Fairytale Hall, a new Disney Princess meet and greet. A new area themed to Snow White and the Seven Dwarfs, featuring Snow White's cottage and the new Seven Dwarfs Mine Train roller coaster, was dedicated on May 28, 2014, and officially opened on May 28, 2014. The ride soft-opened in the Magic Kingdom on May 21, 2014, fully opening a week later on May 28, 2014, replacing 20,000 Leagues Under the Sea: Submarine Voyage (1971-94) and Pooh's Playful Spot (2005-10).

== Description ==
=== Queue ===
The queue for this attraction hosts a few interactive activities. One was a gem-sorting game where guests match up three jewels of different shape but the same color, but has since been replaced with an overlay of immovable physical gems. There is also a spot with barrels full of gems that guests spin to create reflective animations of the Seven Dwarfs on the ceiling. If all of the dwarfs are present on the ceiling, an animation of Snow White appears in the middle of the Dwarfs' animations. Finally there are the "musical spigots," a gem washing station with wooden taps carved to woodland animals. There are 12 spigots each representing a note on the chromatic scale.

=== Attraction ===
The ride travels both indoors and outdoors, similar to Frontierland's major attractions, Big Thunder Mountain Railroad and Tiana's Bayou Adventure. Unlike roller coasters such as the Incredicoaster and Rock 'n' Roller Coaster Starring Aerosmith, this attraction is designed to appeal to a family-oriented crowd with enchanting scenery and cartoonish architecture; it retains details from the original 1937 film. The attraction features a new ride system of a "tilting vehicle". This new technology simulates the swaying and tipping one would expect to experience in a mine cart.

Songs from the film, such as "Heigh-Ho", are featured in the attraction. Most of the Audio-Animatronics, including the Dwarf figures of Doc, Dopey, Happy, Sleepy, Sneezy, Grumpy, and Bashful performing their Yodel Song in the final scene, are recycled from the demolished Snow White's Scary Adventures attraction. Additionally, the vulture figures from the previous attraction ride are perched on a mining structure early in the ride. Many of the figures within the cave are new designs from the animation team, with the most important and recognizable contribution being Doc's high range of motion, two-degree-of-freedom wrist.

The ride features two on-ride cameras that provide videos and pictures for guests to buy through Disney's PhotoPass, which it began doing on September 18, 2014. It is one of three Walt Disney World attractions to provide videos for guests, the others being The Twilight Zone Tower of Terror, and TRON Lightcycle / Run. Unlike certain attractions at Walt Disney World with on-ride cameras, there are no monitors to view the ride pictures and are instead automatically added to a guest's My Disney Experience account via the guest's RFID-enabled MagicBand linked to the account, if riding with one on their wrist, or via Bluetooth if riding with a Bluetooth-enabled smartphone without a MagicBand.

The ride layouts are the same in the Florida and Shanghai versions of the ride. The major differences between the two are that the Shanghai version has all its songs in Mandarin instead of English. Also at the final brake run, while both versions have a hut with Snow White dancing, the Florida version is much closer to the tracks as compared to the Shanghai version, where a well with several animals playing inside it is in place.

=== Voice cast ===
- Jeff Bennett as Bashful
- Corey Burton as Grumpy
- Bill Farmer as Sleepy
- Bob Joles as Sneezy
- Stephen Stanton as Happy
- Andre Sogliuzzo as Doc
- Katherine Von Till as Snow White
- Frank Welker as Dopey / Forest Animals

== Incidents ==
- Magic Kingdom: On November 1, 2014, falling embers from Wishes fireworks show landed on the fake grass exterior of the ride, causing a fire near the bridge that the coaster travels on just before entering the mine. This caused the ride and the surrounding area to be evacuated. The fire was first reported around 10:20 p.m. Reedy Creek Fire Department responded and extinguished the fire within minutes, according to eyewitnesses. By 11 p.m., multiple eyewitnesses said the fire was out. There were no injuries reported. The surrounding area reopened later that night, and the ride reopened at 12:30 p.m. the following afternoon.
