= Fast Lane (Six Flags) =

Line queue system offered at Six Flags amusement parks

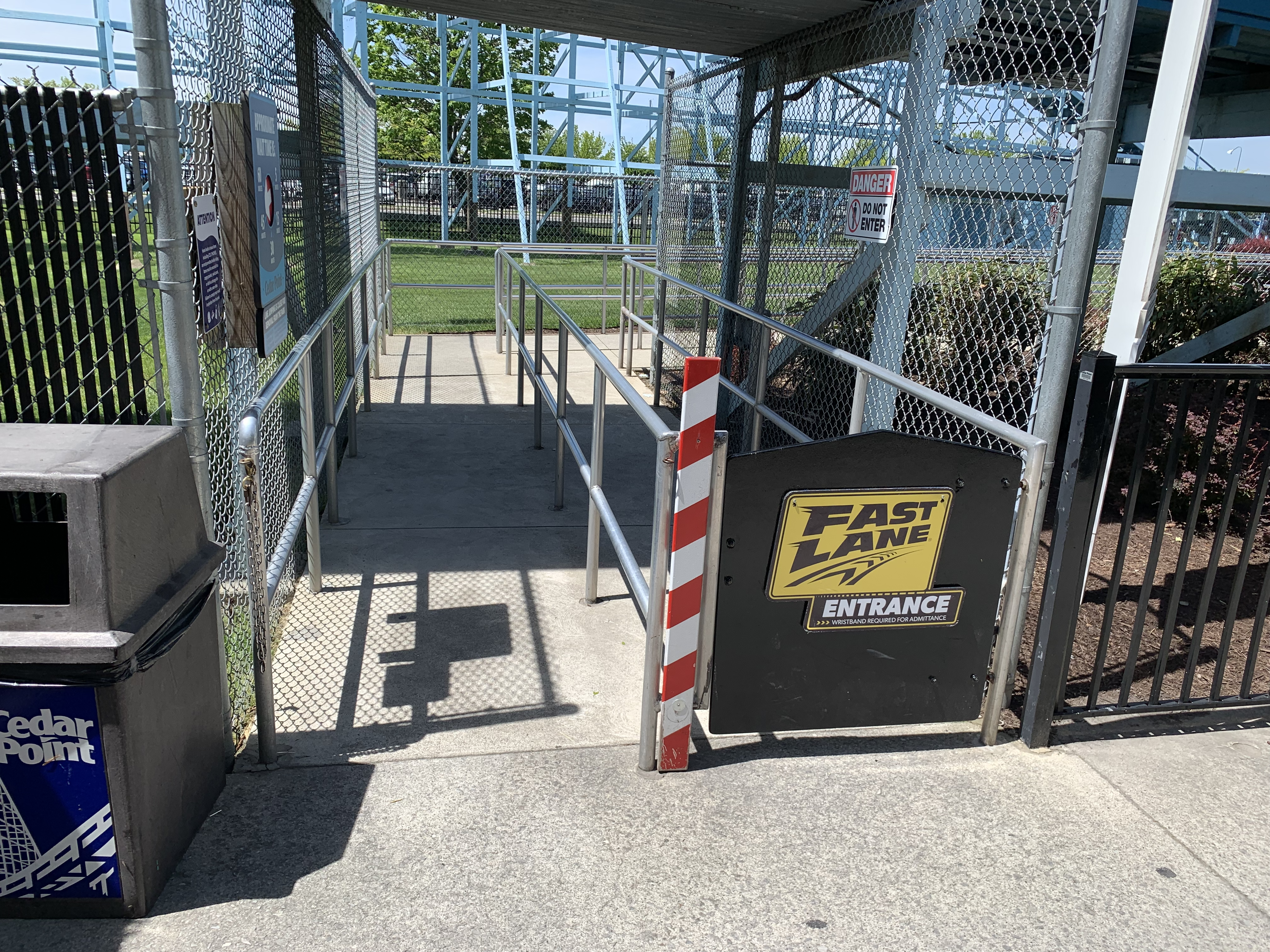
- A Fast Lane queue entrance on Blue Streak at Cedar Point
- Type: Expedited queuing system
- Inventor: Cedar Fair
- Inception: July 18, 2011
- Manufacturer: Six Flags (wristbands); Accesso (mobile)
- Available: Yes
- Current supplier: Six Flags
- Models: Wristband-based: Fast Lane; Fast Lane Plus; Mobile-based: Fast Lane Reserve; Fast Lane Priority; Fast Lane Ultimate
- Slogan: Wait Less. Ride More!

Fast Lane is an optional pay-per-person line queue system offered on select rides at Six Flags amusement parks. The system provides shorter lines, and guests who want access must pay a fee in addition to general park admission.

Originally created by Cedar Fair, it was first piloted in 2011 at Kings Island, the system was rolled out to the rest of the Cedar Fair chain in 2012 following positive feedback. Following their 2024 merger with theme park operator Six Flags, Fast Lane was rolled out to all parks previously owned by Six Flags in January 2026, replacing Six Flags' The Flash Pass system.

== History ==
On July 18, 2011, Kings Island announced the introduction of Fast Lane, a separate line queue featuring shorter wait times. The upcharge for access during its debut year was $50 per person, and the purchase did not include park admission. It was also only active from noon until 7:00 PM originally, but the system was later expanded to all-day availability. Cedar Fair wanted to test the system before deploying to every location, and Kings Island was chosen for that purpose. Fast Lane received positive feedback, and it generated nearly $1 million in half a season. Cedar Fair deemed it a success and decided to roll out Fast Lane to the rest of their parks in 2012. Cedar Fair's Fast Lane differs from the virtual queue system utilized at some competing parks such as Disney's Lightning Lane, which allows guests to reserve their place in line without actually standing in line.

Fright Lane, a Halloween version of Fast Lane, is also available during the fall season at Cedar Fair parks. In 2013, Canada's Wonderland, Carowinds, Cedar Point, Kings Dominion, and Kings Island introduced an upgraded tier called Fast Lane Plus, which adds a few additional rides not available to the standard Fast Lane tier. Dorney Park and Worlds of Fun followed suit in 2014, introducing Fast Lane Plus for water park attractions at Wildwater Kingdom and Oceans of Fun.

In 2017, Michigan's Adventure launched a season pass add on which allowed users to receive a Fast Lane wristband every time they visit. This was later expanded to the other Cedar Fair parks in 2018 and 2019. Some parks in the Cedar Fair chain also offer Fast Lane during the Christmas season, often featuring a smaller number of rides due to limited ride operation.

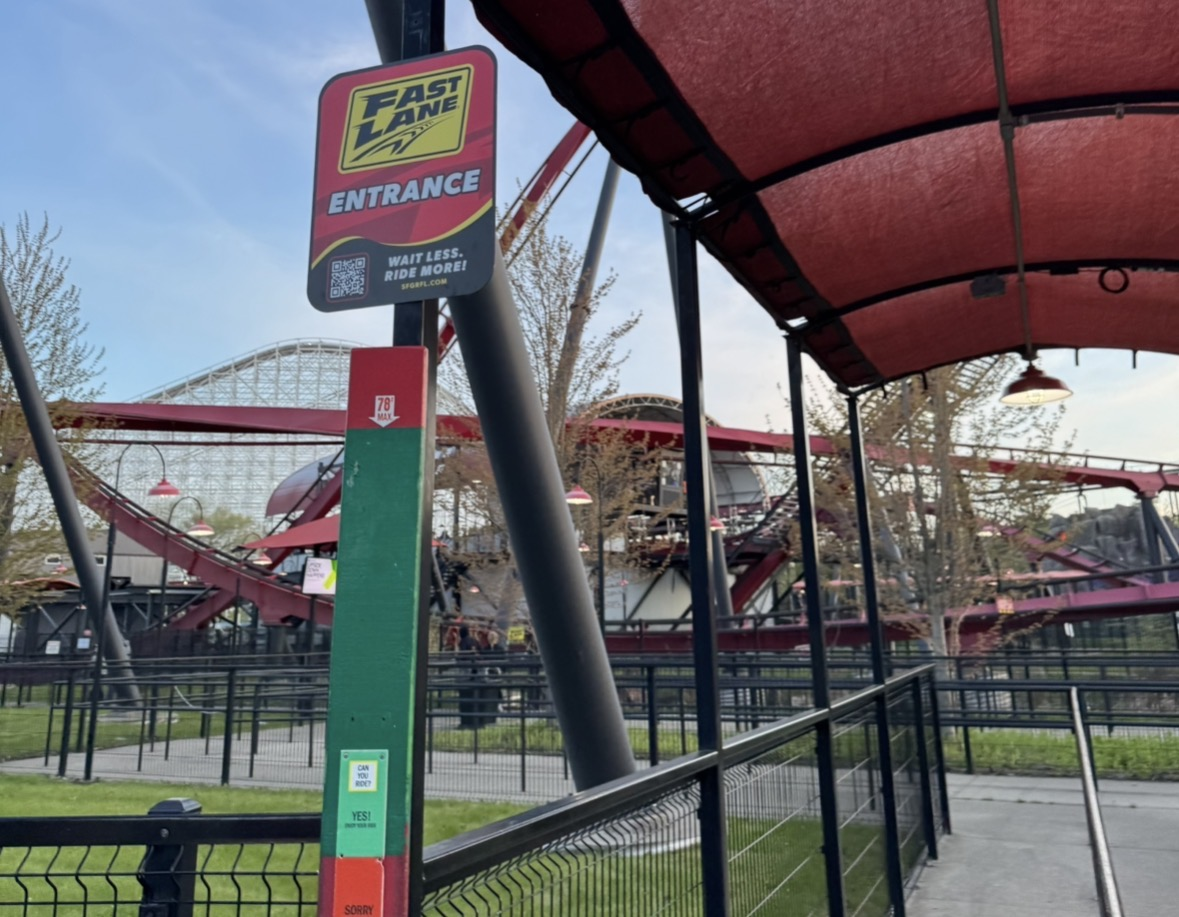
The Fast Lane line to X-Flight in Six Flags Great America, a legacy Six Flags park. Legacy Six Flags parks replaced The Flash Pass with Fast Lane in 2026.

Following the 2024 merger between Six Flags and Cedar Fair, it was announced that parks owned by Six Flags prior to the merger that are now under the new company would adopt the Fast Lane system, replacing The Flash Pass virtual queuing system. The Flash Pass was retired in January 2026.

In February 2026, Fast Lane Reserve, Fast Lane Priority, and Fast Lane Ultimate mobile virtual queue systems were introduced at most legacy Six Flags parks and two legacy Cedar Fair parks: Carowinds and Kings Dominion. The virtual queue system would be provided by Accesso, who had previously provided service for The Flash Pass before its replacement.

== Process ==
Visitors purchase Fast Lane access at the park or online, individually or as a group, with group pricing offering a lower price per group member.

Fast Lane and Fast Lane Plus is a wristband-based queuing system. The wristband is provided to guests and allows them to enter the Fast Lane line queue at attractions that support it. The amount of Fast Lane wrist bands sold per day is restricted to help control wait times.

Fast Lane Reserve and Fast Lane Ultimate both rely on a mobile device for virtual queuing. The Reserve-tier digitally reserves a guest's spot in line while the Ultimate-tier digitally reduces a guest's spot in line by 90%.

== Reception ==
The priority queuing system was originally controversial. An earlier version implemented at Cedar Point in the early 2000s allowed guests to enter a virtual queue, similar to Disney's FastPass at the time, where riders would return to a ride several hours later and skip to the front of the line. The system was first called Ticket to Ride and was later renamed FreeWay. It was discontinued in 2004 due to negative reception, as guests were uncomfortable with the park "sanctioning line-jumping". Fast Lane received higher marks when assessed internally by Cedar Fair, and the system has been in place at all Cedar Fair parks since 2012.

== Availability ==
=== Wristband-based ===
As of June 2026, the following Six Flags parks offer the wristband-based version (Fast Lane and Fast Lane Plus) of Fast Lane:

- California's Great America
- Canada's Wonderland
- Cedar Point
- Dorney Park
- Kings Island
- Knott's Berry Farm
- Schlitterbahn New Braunfels
- Six Flags Darien Lake
- Six Flags Hurricane Harbor Arlington
- Six Flags White Water

=== Mobile-based ===
As of June 2026, the following Six Flags parks offer the mobile-based version (Reserve, Priority, and Ultimate) of Fast Lane:

- Carowinds
- Kings Dominion
- Six Flags Discovery Kingdom
- Six Flags Fiesta Texas
- Six Flags Great Adventure
- Six Flags Great America
- Six Flags Magic Mountain
- Six Flags New England
- Six Flags Over Georgia
- Six Flags Over Texas

== See also ==
- Virtual queue systems at Disney Parks
