= Frog Design =

Creative and design consultancy

- Type: Subsidiary
- Industry: Design firm, industrial design, interaction design, management consulting, innovation management, service design, software engineering, organization design, Venture Management
- Founded: 1969
- Founder: Hartmut Esslinger
- Headquarters: San Francisco, California, United States
- Area served: Worldwide
- Key people: Gagandeep Gadri (Global Managing Director)
- Owner: Capgemini
- Number of employees: 2,000+ (2021)
- Website: https://www.frog.co

frog (styled as "frog, part of Capgemini Invent") is a global creative and design consultancy founded in 1969 by industrial designer Hartmut Esslinger in Mutlangen, Germany, where it was initially named "esslinger design". Soon after, the company moved to Altensteig, Germany, then opened a new studio in Palo Alto, California, and ultimately moved to its current headquarters in San Francisco, California. The company has studios in North and Central America, Europe, and Asia.

The name was changed to frog design in 1982 (the name originating from an acronym for Esslinger's home country, the Federal Republic of Germany; it was originally styled exclusively in lower-case as an expression of its belief in a democratic place of work, where ideas are openly and freely shared, and in opposition to the capitalization of nouns in German). The brand was once again restyled as frog in 2011 to signify an expanded portfolio of services that included strategy and organization activation.

The company was acquired by Capgemini in 2021 and is now a part of Capgemini Invent.

== History ==
The firm's first designs, in 1969, were for WEGA, a German radio and television manufacturer that was later acquired by Sony. frog continued to work for Sony and designed the Trinitron television receiver in 1975, and several editions of the Walkman. Their first designs for computer manufacturers were for proprietary systems by CTM (Computertechnik Müller) in 1970 and Diehl Data Systems in 1979. More prominent are the designs for Apple Computer, starting with the case of the portable Apple IIc, introducing the Snow White design language used by Apple during 1984–1990, and continuing with several Macintosh models. The firm designed the NeXT Computer in 1987 and Sun's SPARCstations in 1989. Frog also worked with Microsoft and designed logos and identities for Windows XP, Internet Explorer 6 and Windows Media Player 8 in 2000, not all of which were used in production. More recently, the firm is known for its work with General Electric (2010–2015) and on Disney's Magicbands and MyMagic+ (launched 2015).

In August 2004, the company announced that Flextronics International, a large electronics manufacturing services provider, was taking an equity stake in the company for approximately $25 million; in 2006, frog was part of a deal through which private equity firm Kohlberg Kravis Roberts & Co. (KKR) acquired nine of Flextronic's assets. frog was later acquired by engineering firm Aricent, which itself was acquired by Altran, which in 2019 was in turn acquired by the consulting firm Capgemini. Today, frog is organized under the "Capgemini Invent" umbrella, integrating staff from Fahrenheit 212, Idean, and June21 into the frog brand.

frog has had studios across Europe, North America, and Asia for much of its history, and as of 2024, has studios across the globe, including having a presence in Milan, Munich, San Francisco, New York, London, Bangalore, and Singapore.

== Management ==
Frog was founded as a small industrial firm by Hartmut Esslinger. Esslinger was the company's first Chief Creative Office (CCO), and with his wife, Patricia Roller (who later served as CEO), frog grew and achieved international prominence.

In 2005, Esslinger and Roller decided to sell frog and leave the company. Following their departure from the firm, Mark Rolston became the next CCO, cementing the company's evolution into the digital experience. Doreen Lorenzo became President of frog design and remained in that position until September 2013. In 2013, Hans Neubert became the third CCO of frog. After Neubert's departure and the frog's subsequent acquisition by Capgemini, the company changed the structure of its executive team, with regional creative heads as part of a globally distributed Design Leadership Team. In parallel to the company's creative leadership, after Doreen Lorenzo's departure, several individuals have been CEO or president, including Harry West (2015–18) and Andy Zimmerman (2013–15 and 2018–21).

== Gallery ==
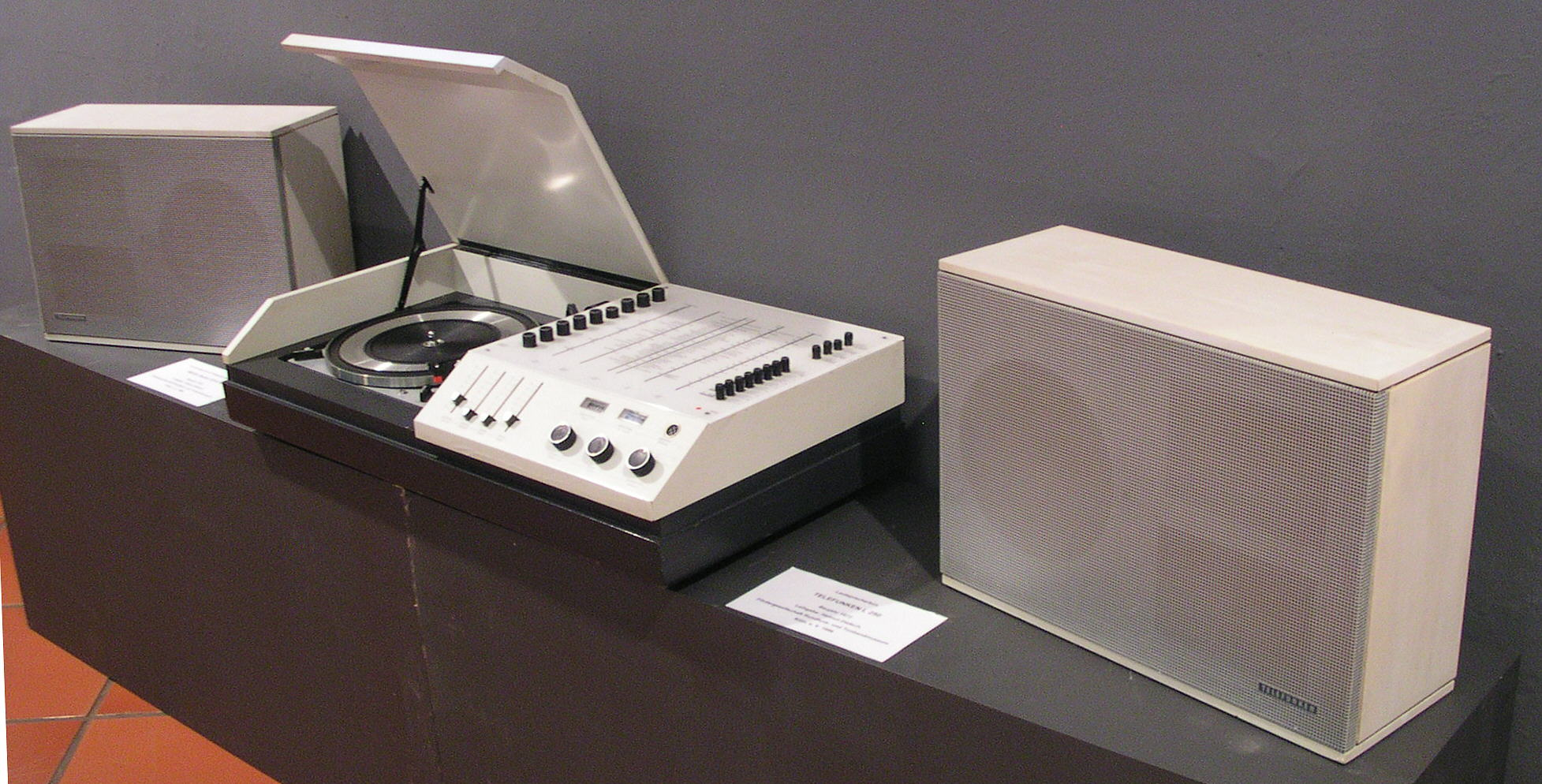
WEGA Studio 3214 Hifi (c. 1972)

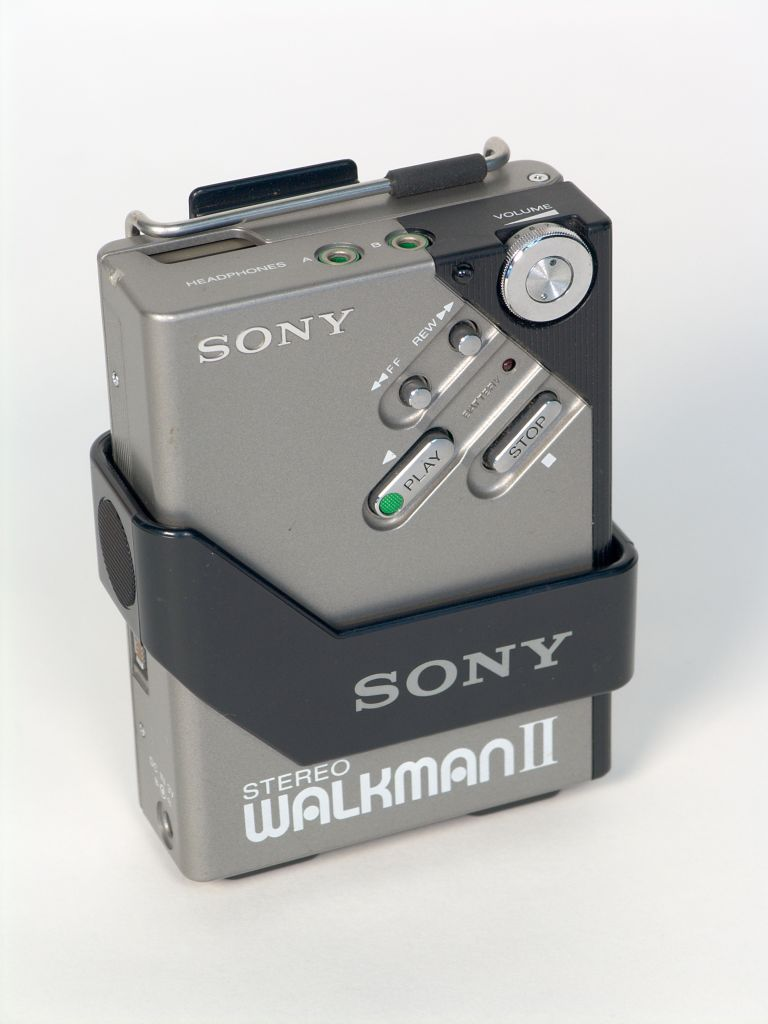
Sony Walkman WM-2 (c. 1981)

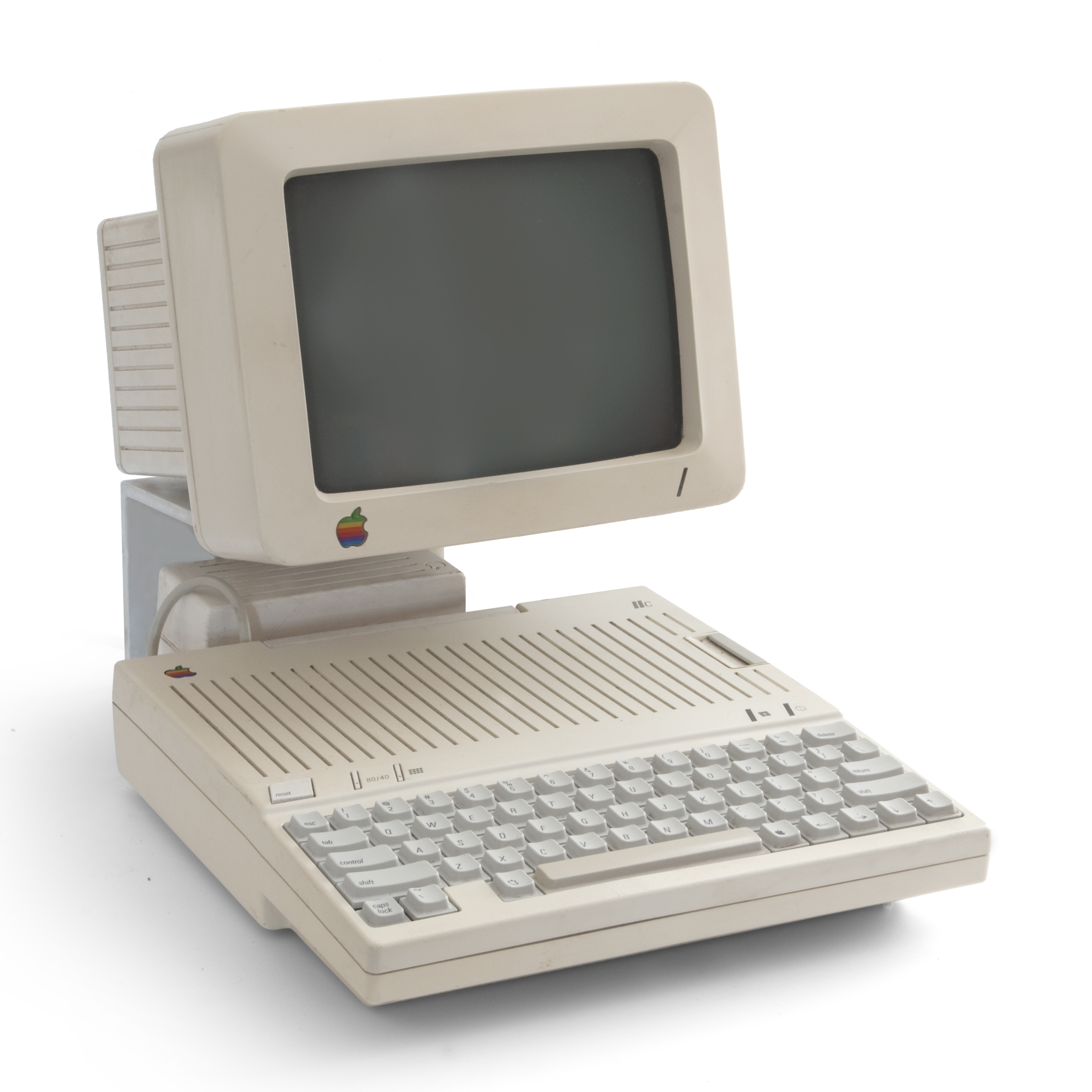
Apple IIc and the Snow White design language (c. 1984)

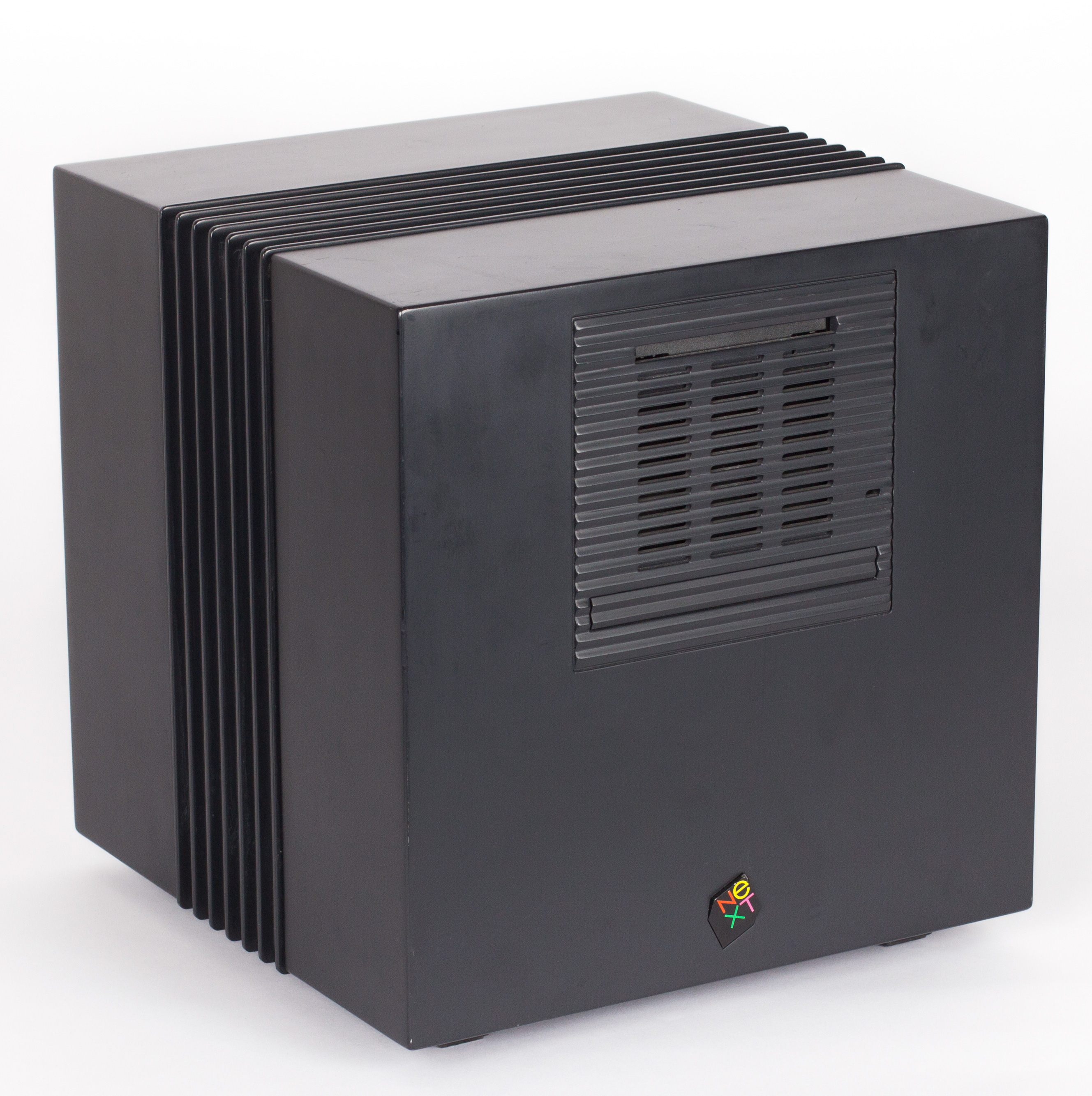
NeXTcube (c. 1990)

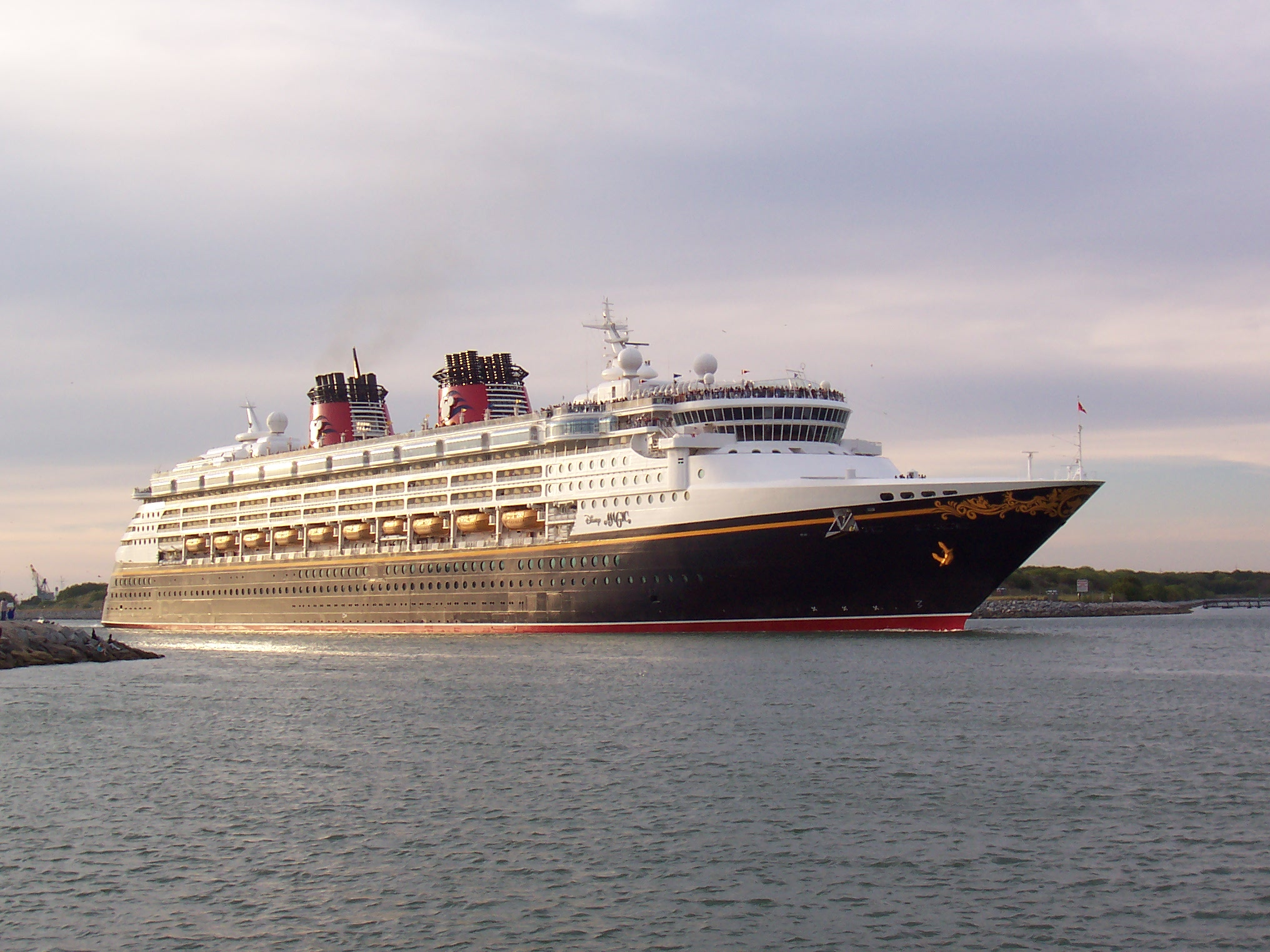
Disney Magic (c. 1998)

SAP Corporate Identity and digital design language (c. 2000)

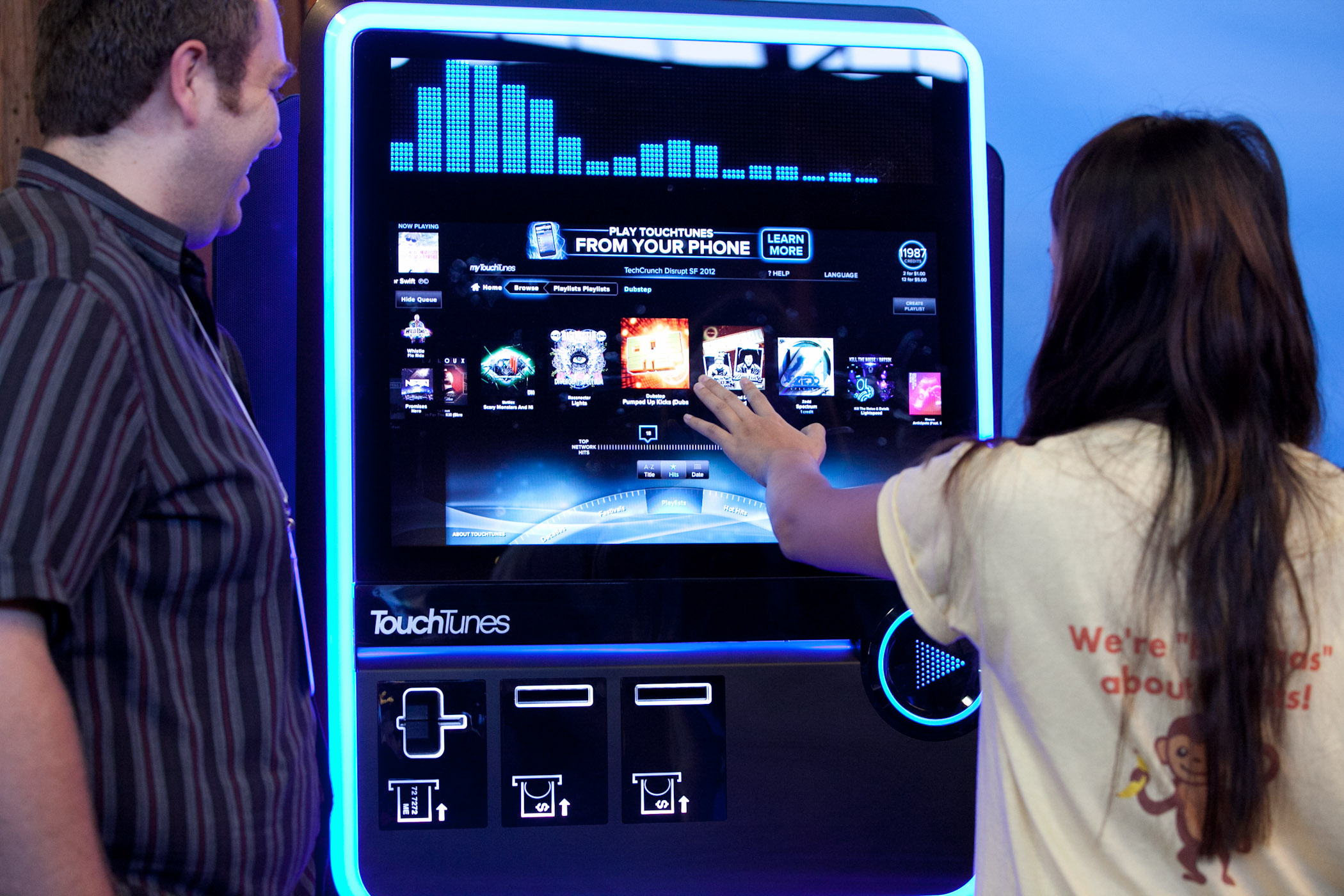
Touchtunes (c. 2010)

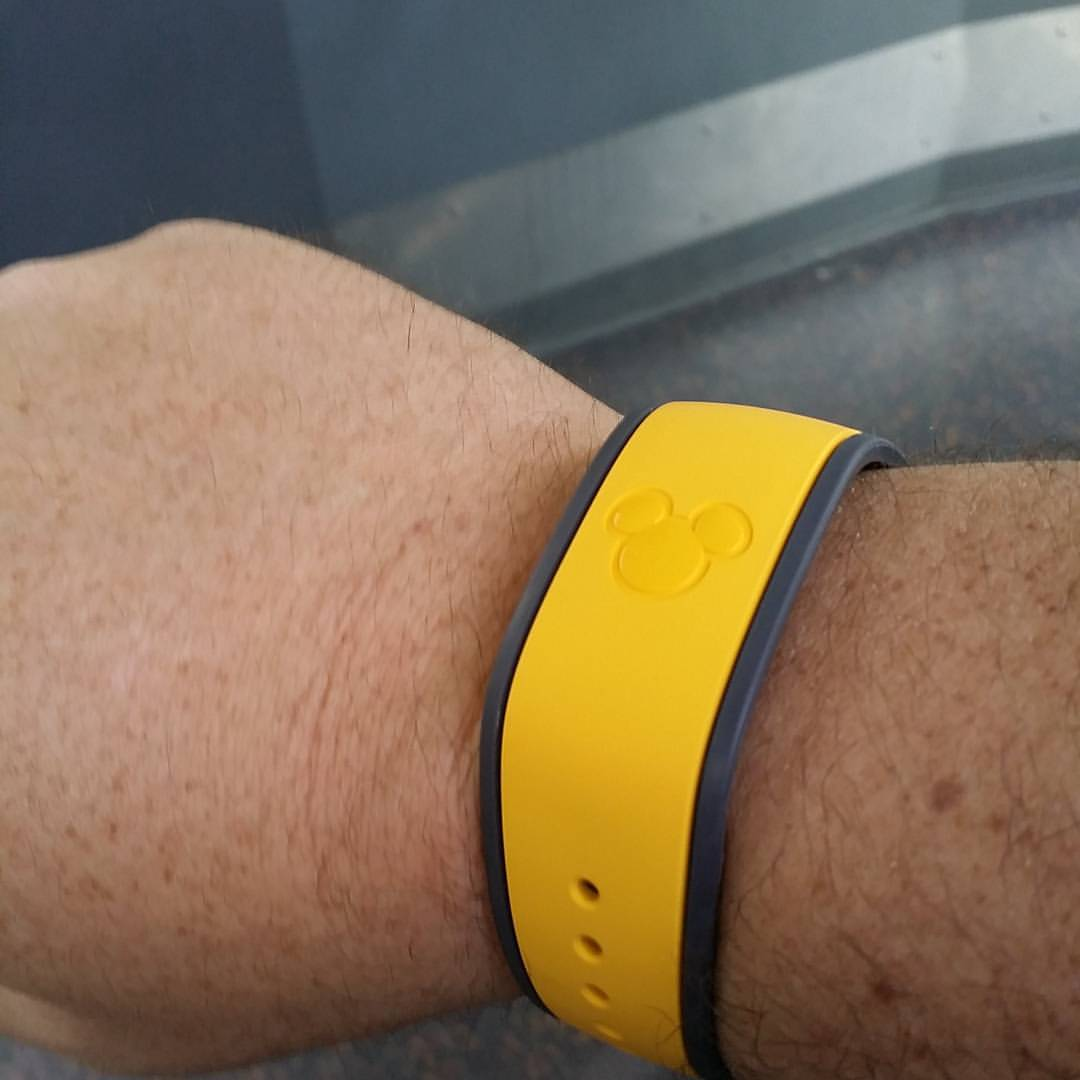
Disney Magicband and MyMagic+ (c. 2015)

== See also ==
- Apple Industrial Design Group
- RKS Design
- IDEO
- Designworks
- Smart Design
