= MagicBand =

Wearable technology in American Disney parks

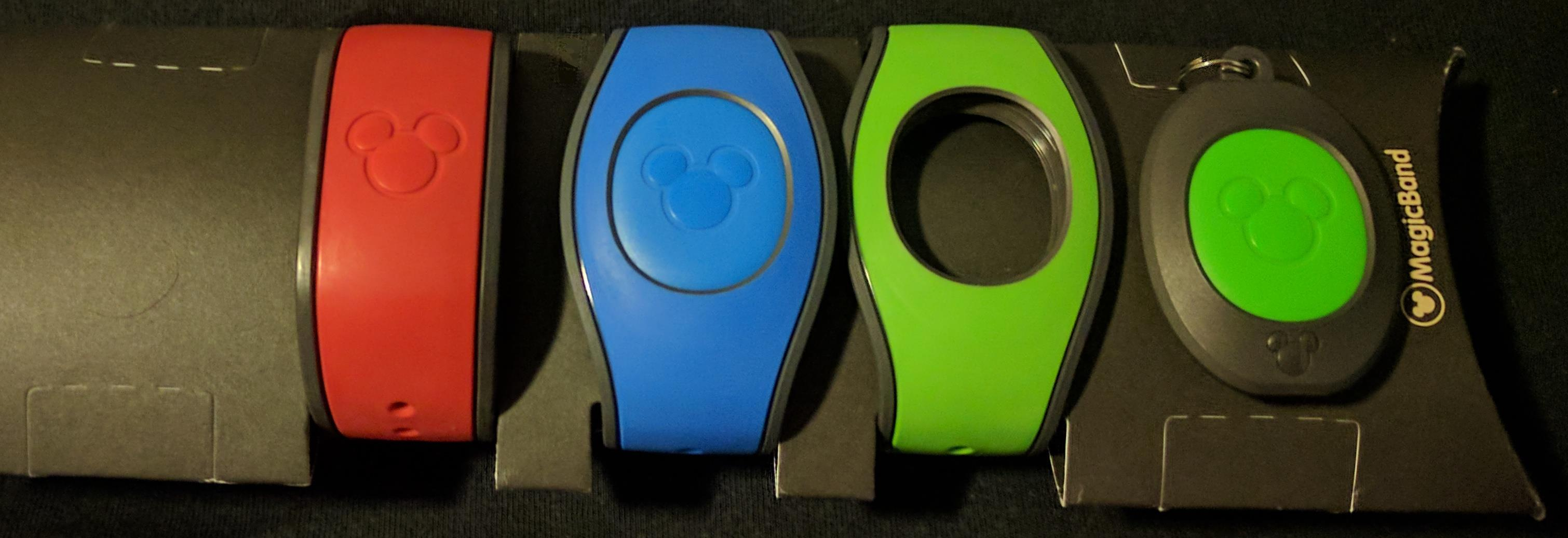
- From left to right: Red (original) MagicBand, Blue MagicBand 2 with Icon, Green MagicBand 2 without Icon, MagicKeeper with Green Icon.
- Type: Wearable technology
- Inventor: Synapse Product Development; Disney Experiences
- Inception: 2013
- Manufacturer: The Walt Disney Company
- Available: Sold at Walt Disney World Resort, Disneyland Resort, and online
- Current supplier: Walt Disney World Resort, Disneyland Resort
- Website: Official Website

A MagicBand is a plastic RFID bracelet that is used by guests at Walt Disney World Resort, Disneyland Resort, and on Disney Cruise Ships (Called DisneyBand+ for the Disney Cruise Line). The MagicBands form the central part of the MyMagic+ experience, providing a way for the system to connect data to guests. This includes connecting park tickets, hotel room keys, payments, and PhotoPass information to the MagicBands. The bands were announced on January 7, 2013 as a part of MyMagic+.

There are three models of MagicBands: the original and now-discontinued MagicBand; the now-discontinued MagicBand 2, which featured interchangeable "Icons" (the actual RFID portion of the bracelet) that could be used on different bands and accessories; and MagicBand+, an enhanced version of MagicBand 2 with additional "smart" functions.

As of January 2, 2024, the MagicBand+ and DisneyBand+ are the only types of bands that function at Disneyland parks.

== Development ==
MagicBands were developed alongside the MyMagic+ program as a way to tie all of the different elements of the program together. The MagicBand idea came at the start of the Next Generation Experience (the code name for what became MyMagic+), when one of the original five members of the project, business development VP John Padgett, was on a flight between Burbank, the Walt Disney Company's headquarters, and Orlando, the location of Walt Disney World. Padgett saw a magnetic therapy, a pseudoscientific alternative medicine practice, wristband in a SkyMall magazine, which claimed to ease sore muscles "while simultaneously improving one's golf swing". He and the project team began considering the design of a wristband encoded with "everything a guest might need—park tickets, photos, coupons, even money". Soon afterward, they created a makeshift xBand (the original code name for the MagicBand) using a velcro strip, a plastic liner, and an RFID tag.

The original MagicBand design was created by Frog Design. The original design consisted of an outer plastic grey bracelet, which can be removed to adjust for a smaller sized wrist, and an inner plastic bracelet. The inner plastic bracelet is one of eight base colors, which can then have a series of different designs printed on them for an extra fee. Sealed inside of the middle of the inner band is the circuitry, consisting of high frequency and ultra-high frequency antennas and a coin cell battery, all embedded on a PCB. Directly outside of the circuitry is an outline of Mickey Mouse's head on the front, while the back includes the Band ID, the FCC ID number, and other information.

On November 19, 2016, Disney unveiled the new MagicBand 2 design. This updated version features a larger Mickey head and an expanded circuitry area. The Icon, which is the removable part of the wristband, can be easily detached using a special screwdriver and transferred to other bands or accessories, such as a keychain. Shortly after the MagicBand+ was introduced, Disney discontinued producing the MagicBand 2.

Disney introduced the new version of the wearable device called MagicBand+ in September of 2021. Since its debut at Disneyland on October 26, 2022, MagicBand+ has enhanced the park experience by allowing guests to play exclusive games and providing a hands-free way to enter the park. The device is also waterproof and rechargeable. Additionally, a new interactive game in Galaxy's Edge launched alongside MagicBand+, enabling guests to embark on a quest to collect bounties throughout the land.

MagicBand+ includes a rechargeable battery to support its interactive features; however, it continues to function as a standard device for park entry, hotel access, payments, and other core uses even when the battery is depleted.

== Implementation ==
Until January 1, 2021, MagicBands were free to all Disney Resort guests. Until August 16, 2021, the bands were free to annual passholders. While other guests receive an RFID-enabled Key to the World card, they are able to purchase a MagicBand online or at the parks. In March of the same year, Disney launched the Magic Mobile Pass on Apple Wallet for iOS and watchOS devices. The pass allows guests to access the parks by tapping their devices at special NFC touchpoints throughout the resort. The service was later extended to Google Wallet on Android devices in April.

Touchpoints, consisting of a ring with an outline of Mickey Mouse's head, are located at park entry points, Lightning Lane (previously Fastpass+) entry points, PhotoPass locations, and point of sales location. When a guest walks up to one, they place their MagicBand's circuitry location against the center of the ring (known as putting "Mickey to Mickey"), in order to engage the system. The ring and outline on the touchpoint will then light up green if access is granted, while it will turn blue if cast member assistance is required. Some special edition MagicBands with graphics printed on them will cause the touchpoints to light up different colors and make different noises instead of the default green when access is granted. An example of this is the red lightsaber Star Wars-themed MagicBand, which changed the default green to red. In normal settings, the touchpoints will never turn red, due to the negative connotation of the color.

Handheld MagicBand readers are used at sit-down restaurants for point of sales and by PhotoPass photographers to link photos. These handheld readers do not have the light up features of the touchpoints.

The MagicBands are also used to connect guests' on-ride photos to their PhotoPass using the long-range ultra-high frequency radio without guests having to use touchpoints to associate the pictures to their account. The MagicBands also allow guests to interact, using a system called Story maker, with screens in rides or queues, such as It's a Small World, Rock 'n' Roller Coaster starring Aerosmith, Haunted Mansion, and Expedition Everest.

On February 13, 2017, it was announced that over 29 million MagicBands had been made.

The MagicBand system has also been used to enforce COVID-19 safety protocols inside the NBA Bubble for the resumption of the 2019-20 NBA season at the ESPN Wide World of Sports Complex; access to courts and practice facilities requires scanning a MagicBand in order to verify that the wearer has completed mandatory health monitoring protocols.

MagicBands+ will light up during or react to select attractions and experiences. Known effects have included or currently include:

- Disneyland
  - Fantasmic!
- Disney California Adventure
  - World of Color — One
- Magic Kingdom
  - Happily Ever After
  - Haunted Mansion
  - It's a Small World
  - Pirates of the Caribbean
  - Tiana's Bayou Adventure
  - Tron Lightcycle Power Run
  - Space Mountain (Blue Tunnel)
- Epcot
  - Guardians of the Galaxy: Cosmic Rewind (blue flashing lights + vibrations in exit area)
  - Journey into Imagination with Figment
  - Luminous: The Symphony of Us
  - Remy's Ratatouille Adventure (red+blue lights in exit area)
  - Soarin' (exit area)
  - Spaceship Earth at night
  - Turtle Talk with Crush
- Disney's Hollywood Studios
  - Fantasmic! (multiple throughout, changes with most scenes)
  - For the First Time in Forever: A Frozen Sing-Along Celebration
  - Indiana Jones Epic Stunt Spectacular!
  - Mickey & Minnie's Runaway Railway (orange+white lights + haptic vibrations)
  - Muppet*Vision 3D (rainbow flashing lights + vibrations at exit and possibly longer)
  - Rock 'n' Roller Coaster Starring Aerosmith (blue+aqua+purple+red lights + vibrations in exit and photo room)
  - The Twilight Zone Tower of Tower (red lights + vibrations)
- Disney's Animal Kingdom
  - Avatar Flight of Passage (jewel-toned lights)
