= Support bubble =

The support-bubble concept

In the context of the COVID-19 pandemic, a support bubble may refer to:

- First COVID-19 tier regulations in England#Linked households – regulations in England
- COVID-19 pandemic in New Zealand#Support bubble – regulations in New Zealand
