= MyMagic+ =

Suite of technologies at Walt Disney World

- Type: Suite of technologies
- Inventor: Disney Parks, Experiences and Products (Andy Schwalb, Eric Jacobson, John Padgett, Kevin Rice, and Jim MacPhee)
- Inception: 2008; 18 years ago
- Manufacturer: Disney
- Available: Yes
- Website: https://disneyworld.disney.go.com/plan/my-disney-experience/my-magic-plus/

MyMagic+ is a suite of technologies first implemented at the Walt Disney World Resort that enable a number of services and enhancements to guests of the resort. Influenced by wearable computing and the concept of the Internet of Things, the system is primarily designed to consolidate various functions, such as payments, hotel room access, ticketing, FastPass, into a digital architecture consisting primarily of radio systems, RFID-enabled wristbands known as MagicBands, and features accessible via online services and mobile apps.

== Development ==
=== Conceptualization ===
Development of the MyMagic+ system began in 2008 at the request of Walt Disney World president Meg Crofton, who requested the development of a system to address the various "pain points" that visitors had encountered throughout the company's properties and had affected their likelihood to return to the resorts, and other "barriers to getting into the experience faster".

A former Disney executive stated that in regards to technology, the company was "failing to recognize key consumer trends that were starting to influence how people interacted with brands", such as social networking, and increased use of devices such as smartphones. They believed that the parks' inability to adopt new technologies to enhance the guest experience was harming their "relevancy".

The project, codenamed "Next Generation Experience" (NGE) and backed by Disney Parks chairman Jay Rasulo, president Al Weiss, and Crofton, was initially staffed by a group of Disney Parks executives known as the "Fab Five" (a term referring to the five main characters of the Mickey Mouse universe); including Andy Schwalb, Eric Jacobson, John Padgett, Kevin Rice, and Jim MacPhee.

The group aimed to address how families navigate Walt Disney World and "maximize" their time there: MacPhee felt that the park was becoming "dangerously complex and transactional" in its operations, citing long queues, complicated ticketing systems, the need to carry various passes and other items with them, and analysis showing that families often backtracked towards Cinderella Castle in their efforts to navigate Walt Disney World.

The team took influence from other sources, such as a magnet therapy wristband Padgett saw within a SkyMall catalog en route to Orlando, and wearable devices such as the Nike+ activity tracker. Work on rudimentary prototypes of the end-user component of the system, codenamed the "xBand", began in a lab within the former Epcot Body Wars attraction.

The system was to incorporate RFID technology, which would allow the band to serve as a contactless smart card to consolidate several common functions (including FastPass, hotel room key, and payments), help track guests for park traffic management, and for analytics. With the help of external contractors, as well as the design agency Frog, concepts for uses of the system were brainstormed, including a digital reservation system, and personalized experiences – such as summoning characters for birthday greetings, and a restaurant concept where pre-ordered meals would be delivered to guests' tables using the bands to locate them – a concept that would later be realized as the Beauty and the Beast-themed Be Our Guest Restaurant.

As part of the digital reservation system, which would be known as FastPass+, Frog called for attractions to be equipped with RFID readers embedded within specially designed posts; these posts contain an encircled Mickey Mouse symbol, which serves as an indicator to users for where the bands can be used, as implied by a similar symbol on the band itself for the purposes of usability. Conflicts brewed between Frog and Imagineers, who believed that they were interfering with their roles as the team responsible for designing park experiences. Of particular objection was a proposal that the posts have a consistent appearance across the entire resort – with the Imagineers arguing that they would ruin the suspension of disbelief of the various areas of the resort by contradicting their respective themes. However, Frog would later compromise to allow the readers to have themed appearances whilst maintaining consistent elements that indicate their purpose.

=== Implementation ===
In January 2010, Jay Rasulo left the Disney Parks division to become chief financial officer of Disney, with his predecessor Thomas O. Staggs replacing him as chairman of Disney Parks and head of the NGE project. The NGE research and development lab moved to an unused soundstage building at Disney's Hollywood Studios near the Toy Story Midway Mania! attraction. A large-scale "living blueprint" of the system's workflow was constructed, which incorporated how a family makes a reservation and receives their wristbands in advance, their travel from the airport to the resort, hotel check-in, and how the bands would be used at attractions. Schwalb justified the manner in which the system was demonstrated, joking that "At Disney, you can't just create a PowerPoint presentation and say, 'Hey, give me $10 million to build this.'" Various Disney board members, including Bob Iger, and other notable figures such as James Cameron and Pixar's John Lasseter, visited the lab to witness demonstrations of the infrastructure.

In February 2011, Disney approved a budget of $1 billion for implementing the NGE system at Walt Disney World Resort, targeting a roll-out by February 2012; however, this target was missed. On January 7, 2013, Disney officially unveiled the new platform, known as MyMagic+. The system would be rolled out over the course of the year; implementing MyMagic+ and its associated functionality required the installation of new equipment across the entire resort – a process complicated by its large size, and the need to minimize disruption to the resort's operation throughout the transition. Alongside upgrades to entry points, Wi-Fi had to be installed across the resort in order to allow use of the associated mobile apps by cast members and guests, and locks on over 28,000 hotel room doors had to be upgraded to support the new RFID system.

In 2014, the system was awarded Fast Company magazine's "Innovation by Design" award for the year.

== Functions ==
The MyMagic+ platform consists of four main components: MagicBands, FastPass+, My Disney Experience, and PhotoPass Memory Maker. These features are associated with guests via a Disney.com account.

MagicBands are waterproofed, RFID wristbands that provide access to various functions across Walt Disney World, including access to the Magical Express shuttle service from Orlando International Airport, hotel check-in and room access, park ticketing, and FastPass+. MagicBands may optionally be linked to a resort reservation for contactless payments via room charge within shops and restaurants at the resort; spending limits can be placed on an individual guest's MagicBand to prevent overuse, and a PIN must be entered for purchases. MagicBands are distributed to guests of Disney-controlled hotels and annual pass holders as part of their admission costs, and can also be bought on-site. Customized MagicBands can be shipped to a group before they travel to the resort; they are available in various color options – all of which contain a removable grey-colored trimming, and inscriptions of guests' names. Accessories for customizing the bands, including trinkets based on Disney properties (including Frozen and Star Wars) can be purchased at the resort as well. Those who do not pre-order a MagicBand receive a grey-colored version upon their check-in, and those who opt out of the program are instead issued an RFID card.

The FastPass+ service allows guests to pre-book reserved times for up to three attractions per-day (including rides, dining, and VIP access to other events) in advance (60 days for Disney hotel guests, and 30 days for all other guests). Guests may make a further reservation after they have used their initial three selections. The My Disney Experience website and mobile app provide the ability for guests to plan and manage their visit to the resort, including FastPass+ reservations, maps, queue times, and the ability to share itineraries with friends who may also be attending the resort at the same time. Free Wi-Fi access was implemented across the resort to enable on-site use of the app, and MagicBand-enabled kiosks are also available for managing FastPass+.

PhotoPass Memory Maker allows guests to associate the pictures taken on attractions, dining, character meets, and entertainment locations with their MagicBand, Memory Maker card, or Disney PhotoPass card for 30 days. If the advanced purchase option was chosen, the guest must wait three days before associating photos with their account. Guests have a digital-only entitlement to the photos which enables them to download as many photos or all of the photos that were taken during their visit to the parks. Additionally, guests can print the pictures at their residence, at a retailer, or they can have the pictures printed and mailed to them for an additional charge. The guests have up to 45 days from the date the individual photo was taken to download the photo, after which the photo will expire. Disney has also taken steps to automatically link photos taken on rides with the guest's MagicBands. The Seven Dwarfs Mine Train has two spots where photos are taken and the photos are then sent to the guest's PhotoPass Memory Maker without the guest needing to identify their picture.

MagicBands are also utilized for interactive features within the park; the relaunched Test Track allows users to design a car during the queuing area, and upload it into other areas of the attraction (including the ride itself, and interactive areas in the post-ride area). Disney announced plans to enable personalization features through MagicBands, such as animatronics interacting with guests, or being able to recognize guests celebrating their birthdays (in contrast to the current use of "Birthday buttons") and have cast members react accordingly. However, as of 2015, some of these announced features have not yet been implemented; employees have cited resistance to incorporating MyMagic+ into attractions by Imagineers due to their internal culture, technical issues that had been experienced throughout the rollout of the platform, and a need to determine how it would be leveraged.

== Use outside of Walt Disney World ==
In April 2016, Bob Iger announced to shareholders that Disney planned to expand the MyMagic+ concepts to its other properties due to advancements in technology, but that they would be implemented in "different ways". Iger stated that "[because] mobile technology and personal mobile devices can offer a lot of the functionality that a lot of the bands we created offer", MagicBands would not necessarily be used elsewhere. The company previously announced that MagicBands would not be utilized at Disney's California parks, and that Shanghai Disney Resort would use smartphones to accomplish most of the same functions accomplished by the MagicBands in Orlando. This decision was later revised as MagicBand technology was announced to be coming to the California parks in 2022. It became available on Disney Cruise Line in 2023.

Disneyland Paris uses an RFID card MagicPass system.

== Current Status ==
The MyMagic+ name is no longer used as the primary name for Walt Disney World's digital guest services. Disney currently refers to the website and mobile application as My Disney Experience; Disney's 2022 terms describe features of My Disney Experience as being “sometimes” referred to as MyMagic+.
