= Virtual queue systems at Disney Parks =

Virtual queuing systems used at Disney Parks

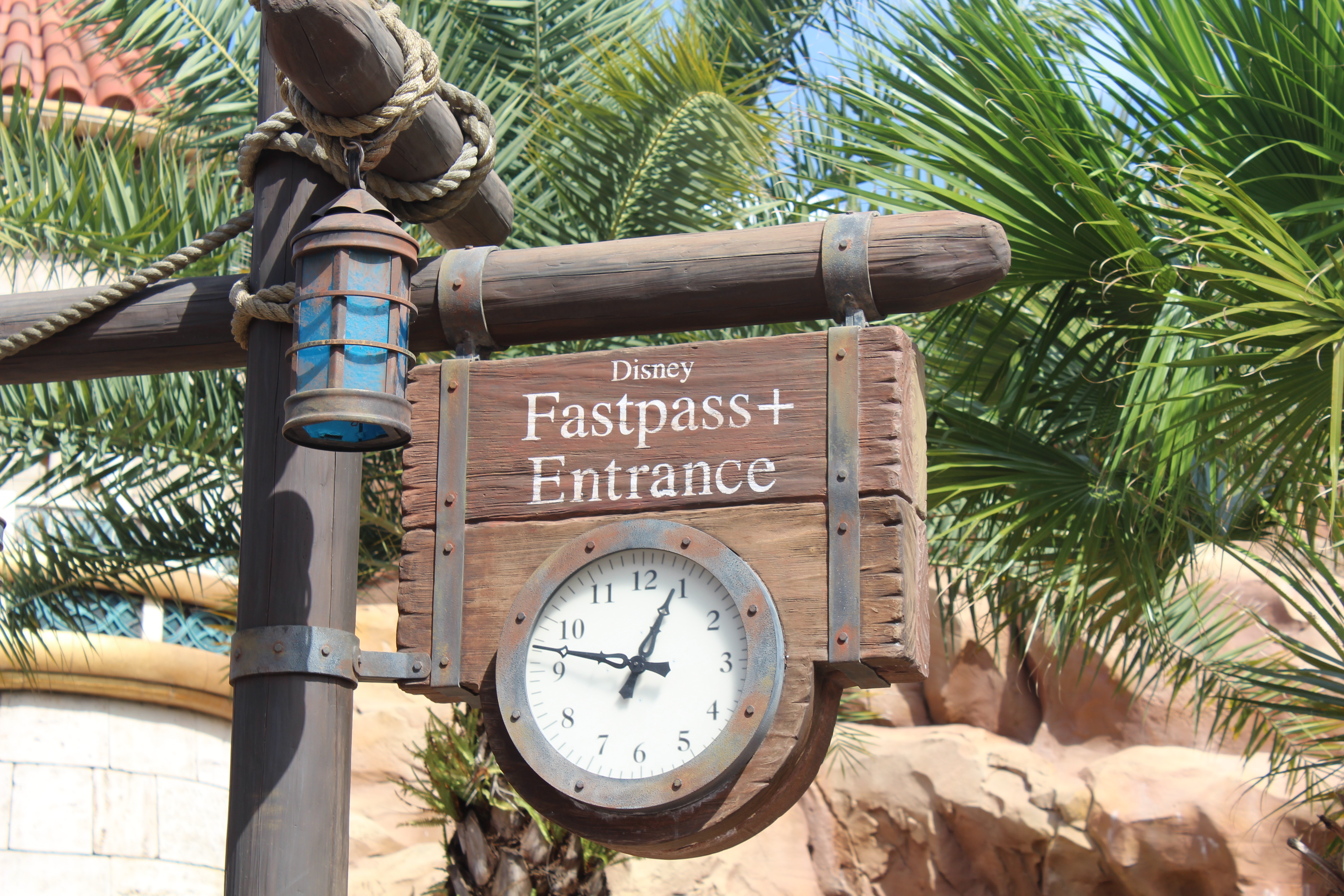
Former FastPass+ entrance at Under the Sea: Journey of the Little Mermaid at Magic Kingdom, pictured in 2015.

Disney Parks have utilized virtual queue systems since the introduction of the FastPass System in 1999. These systems allow theme park visitors to wait in a virtual queue for an attraction, reducing the time spent waiting on a physical line. Presently, access to virtual queues at all Disney Parks are available through an additional charge. The current virtual queue systems are Lightning Lane at Disneyland Resort and Walt Disney World Resort, and Disney Premier Access at Disneyland Paris, Hong Kong Disneyland Resort, Tokyo Disney Resort, and Shanghai Disney Resort. The previous systems were FastPass, FastPass+, and MaxPass.

== Current virtual queue systems ==
=== Lightning Lane ===
Lightning Lane

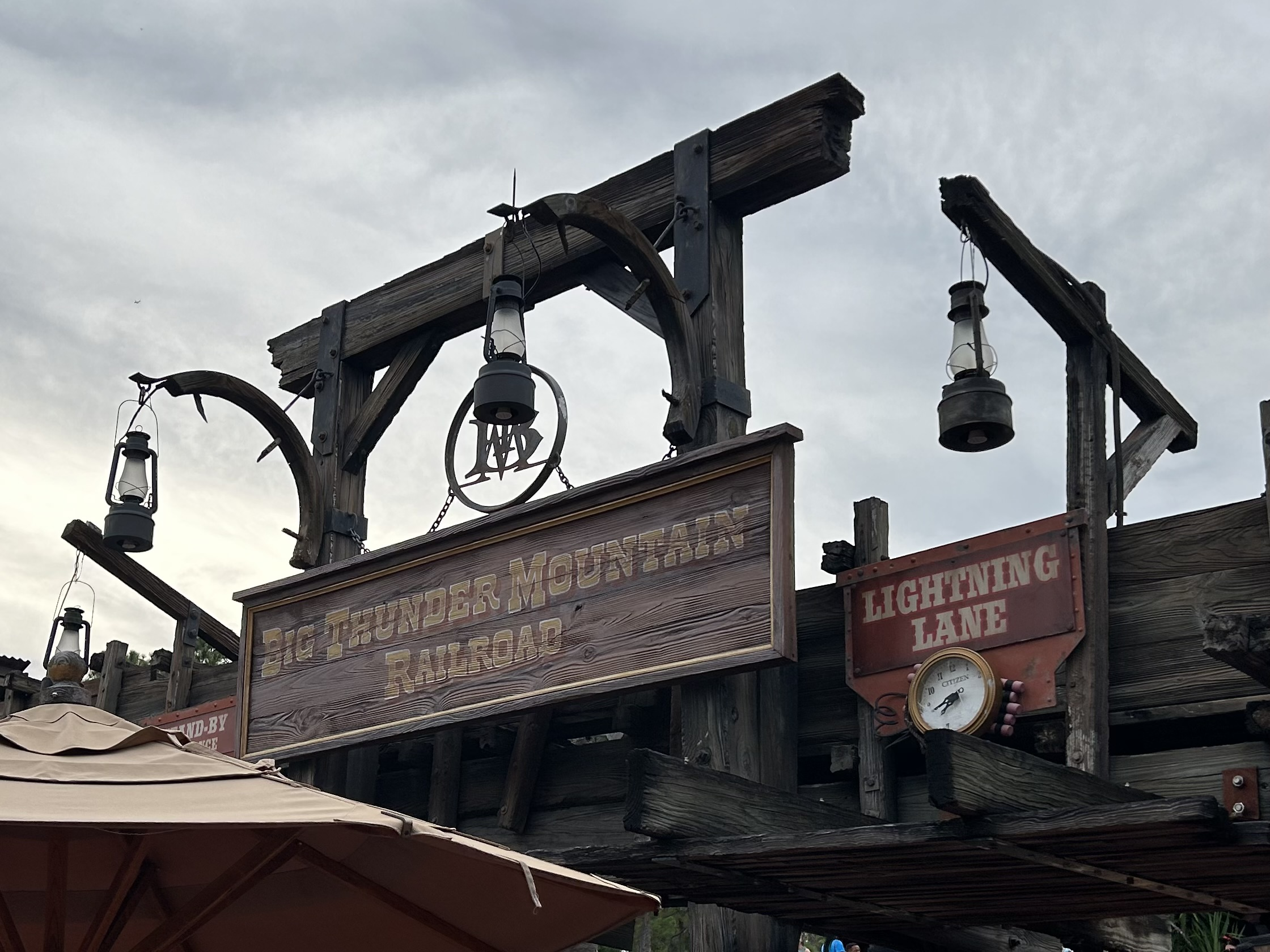
- Big Thunder Mountain Railroad at Magic Kingdom with Lightning Lane signage.
- Type: Virtual queuing system
- Inventor: Disney Experiences
- Inception: 2021
- Manufacturer: Disney
- Available: Yes

Lightning Lane is an optional paid service currently offered at Walt Disney World Resort and Disneyland Resort that allows guests to enter an express queue with shorter wait times at select attractions. Guests who purchase access to Lightning Lane must book an available time slot to enter the express queue. Guests can purchase Lightning Lane Single Pass for select "high-demand" attractions à-la-carte, Lightning Lane Multi Pass for most other attractions, and/or Lightning Lane Premier Pass for every participating attraction in one theme park (once per attraction).

At Walt Disney World, up to three rides can be "pre-booked" up to seven days in advance, whereas at Disneyland, purchases must be done one at a time while physically at a park. Lightning Lane passes are purchased through the My Disney Experience and Disneyland Resort mobile apps at Walt Disney World Resort and Disneyland Resort, respectively. Guests are required to have valid park admission as well as a Disney park reservation for the same day. Since 2022, the system employs dynamic pricing, with prices varying based on the date of use.

Lightning Lane was introduced in August 2021 and implemented on October 19, 2021 as part of a new AI-generated itinerary planner in the My Disney Experience and Disneyland apps known as Genie. Guests were given the option of purchasing a premium version of Genie, known as Genie+, giving them access to utilize Lightning Lanes. Attraction selections could only be made one at a time the day of, and select "high-demand" attractions were part of a separate system known as Individual Attraction Selection (later rebranded as Individual Lightning Lane). The system replaced the free FastPass+ system at Walt Disney World, as well as the free FastPass and paid MaxPass system at Disneyland.

After numerous guest complaints, Genie+ was replaced at Walt Disney World on July 24, 2024 with Lightning Lane Single Pass and Lightning Lane Multi Pass, allowing guests the opportunity to purchase Lightning Lanes prior to arriving at the resort. Though the system did not change at Disneyland Resort, the Genie+ brand was also retired beginning July 24.

=== Disney Premier Access ===
Disney Premier Access
- Type: Virtual queuing system
- Inventor: Disney Experiences; The Oriental Land Company
- Inception: 2018
- Manufacturer: Disney
- Available: Yes

Disney Premier Access is an optional paid service currently offered at Disneyland Paris, Hong Kong Disneyland Resort, Tokyo Disney Resort and Shanghai Disney Resort that allows guests to enter an express queue with shorter wait times at select attractions.

The system was likely introduced initially as a response to ticket scalping of physical paper FastPass tickets at Shanghai Disneyland. The system was formally called Disney Priority Special and Priority Special+ at the Hong Kong resort.

At Disneyland Paris, guests can purchase Disney Premier Access by selecting one attraction at a time by time slot, or can purchase Premier Access Ultimate to access every participating attraction once in the selected day. At Hong Kong Disneyland, guests can purchase Disney Premier Access by selecting one attraction at a time, three attractions from a set of five, or by choosing all eight available attractions; guests do not need to select specific time slots. At Tokyo Disney Resort, guests can purchase Disney Premier Access for individual attractions at a specific time slot the day of; for a limited time, the resort also offered a 40th Anniversary Priority Pass for free.At Shanghai Disneyland, guests can purchase Disney Premier Access is available for purchase by selecting one attraction at a time, or in a pre-determined set of three attractions, six attractions, or eight attractions.

== Former virtual queue systems ==
=== FastPass ===
Disney FastPass
- Type: Virtual queuing system
- Inventor: Disney Experiences
- Inception: 1999
- Manufacturer: Walt Disney Enterprises, Inc.
- Available: No
- Last production year: January 6, 2022 (Hong Kong)

FastPass was a virtual queue system first introduced in late 1999 by The Walt Disney Company to speed up customer access to certain attractions and amenities at the Disney resorts and theme parks. (Note: However, a ride reservation system was first introduced in world's fairs.) The system allowed guests to avoid long lines at the attractions on which the system was installed, freeing them to partake in other attractions during their wait. There was generally no extra fee for the service. FastPass was predominantly offered at very popular attractions; at a later stage, it was made available additionally for select shows, offering access to a roped-off viewing area.

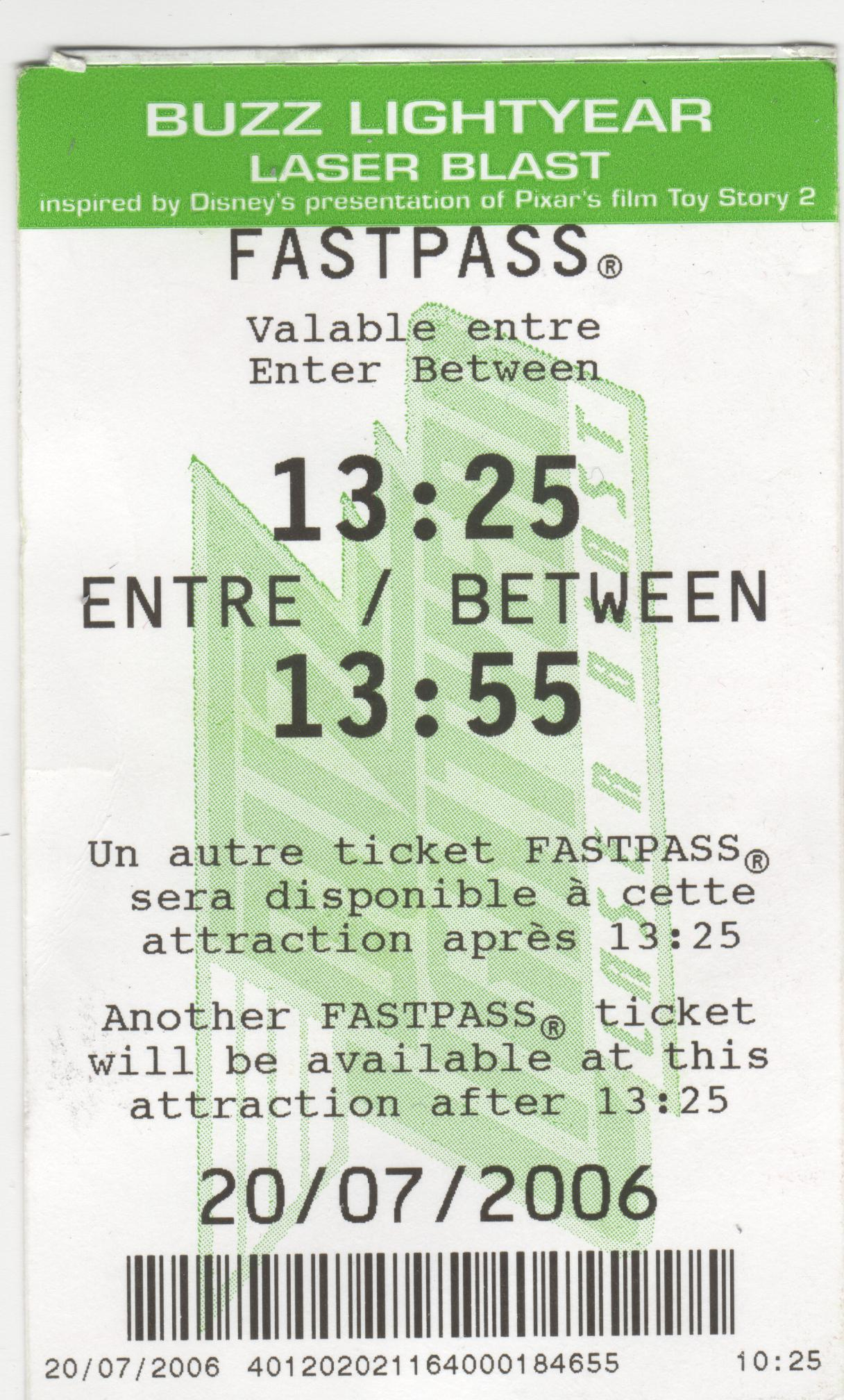
FastPass ticket for Buzz Lightyear Laser Blast at Disneyland Park in Paris, dated July 20, 2006.

To use FastPass, a guest would scan their park ticket at an automated machine, usually located adjacent to or in the vicinity of the attraction they wanted to experience. The machine would print a ticket giving a half-hour or one-hour time range (depending on the park) for the guest to return. When the guest returned, they would have the option to skip the line, entering another queue. Displays near the machines would show the current return times which would be made available; it was not possible to select a different time. In later years at some parks, guests entering a FastPass queue would need to scan their original park ticket rather than the FastPass ticket; this process was implemented to combat the resale of FastPass tickets. The FastPass "ticket" would in this scenario act merely as a reminder of the time of their return slot.

Return slots typically became available soon after the park opened to guests, but not during Extra Magic Hours (early park access open to guests at preferred hotels). The return time advanced in five-minute increments as FastPasses were distributed, and when the park closing time was reached, no further FastPasses were distributed for that attraction that day.

To allow for a wide distribution of FastPass tickets, a guest holding a FastPass could not obtain another FastPass until the beginning of the return timeslot allocated to them. Over time, this changed to allow another FastPass to be obtained two hours after the last one was printed, even if the return time was further away. Additionally, a FastPass for a show, such as World of Color, could be held additionally to a ride FastPass. Any attempt to obtain a FastPass in breach of the waiting period would result in an error message being printed on a FastPass slip, informing the guest of the time they could next obtain a FastPass.

At Walt Disney World, FastPass was replaced by the FastPass+ system in 2014. At Disneyland Resort, FastPass system was offered alongside MaxPass beginning in 2017. On August 18, 2021, it was announced that the FastPass, FastPass+ and MaxPass would officially be retired in favor of the new Disney Genie service in Disneyland and Walt Disney World, and by Disney Premier Access at Disneyland Paris, Hong Kong Disneyland, Tokyo Disney Resort and Shanghai Disneyland.

=== FastPass+ ===
Disney FastPass+
- Type: Virtual queuing system
- Inventor: Disney Experiences
- Inception: 2013
- Manufacturer: Walt Disney Enterprises, Inc.
- Available: No
- Last production year: 2021

FastPass+ was a system that allowed guests to reserve and plan a visit in advance to parks at Walt Disney World, introduced as part of the resort's MyMagic+ suite of technologies. Reservations were available for select attractions, Character Greetings, entertainment, and viewing areas for parades and fireworks. The system allowed guests to make reservations up to 60 days in advance, and change at any time. FastPass+ was a reservation and scheduling system, unlike the old paper FastPass system, which was strictly a virtual queuing concept. Additionally, guests were encouraged to reserve FastPass+ sections with their group and were allowed to change the group's FastPass+ reservation. Guests that stayed at an onsite Disney resort could make reservations up to 60 days in advance while all other guests could schedule reservations up to 30 days in advance, assuming tickets were linked to their account. Annual Passholders could hold FastPass+ reservations for up to 7 different days in the 30-day window. If a Passholder stayed at a Disney resort onsite, they also had 60 days to make reservations for the entire length of the stay.

Guests could make three reservations in advance for each day, and all three were required to be at the same theme park. Disney's Animal Kingdom, Epcot, and Disney's Hollywood Studios separated the attractions available for reservation into two tiers. Guests were restricted in the combination of attractions they were able to reserve in these parks to ensure better reservation availability for others at the parks' most popular attractions. Guests had the option to make a further reservation via an in-park kiosk or the My Disney Experience app after they had used their initial three selections subject to availability. They had the option to continue to make further reservations after using each reservation, until all reservation slots had been allocated for the day.

Disney FastPass+ did not return to Walt Disney World after the parks reopened in July 2020 after the COVID-19 pandemic closures. The system was officially discontinued and replaced in October 2021 by Lightning Lane.

=== MaxPass ===
Disney MaxPass
- Type: Virtual queuing system
- Inventor: Disney Experiences
- Inception: 2017
- Manufacturer: Walt Disney Enterprises, Inc.
- Available: No
- Last production year: 2021

MaxPass was a virtual queue system implemented on July 19, 2017 at Disneyland Resort. The system worked in conjunction with the original FastPass system, which remained available and free of charge. MaxPass allowed virtual queue reservations to be made from the Disneyland App without having to walk to the FastPass machines at rides. Instead, the system allowed users to receive a FastPass return time on their smartphone through the Disneyland mobile app when they were inside the parks. Guests who bought the MaxPass system were also able to download their PhotoPass pictures for free. MaxPass was Disney's first premium virtual queue system, thought it was included with select Disneyland Annual Passports.

The origin of the system can be tracked back to a patent filed on August 30, 2007, by the Walt Disney Company for using SMS as a way to get and use FastPasses in the park. The patent indicated that guests staying at Disney hotels would be allowed to make early reservations for attractions using their in-room television. The MaxPass system was discontinued and replaced in December 2021 by Lightning Lane.

== See also ==
- Disney PhotoPass
- E ticket
- MyMagic+, the overall system that FastPass+ was a part of
- Fast Lane, a virtual queue system for Six Flags parks
