= Accesso =

Technology company based in Berkshire

Accesso Technology Group PLC

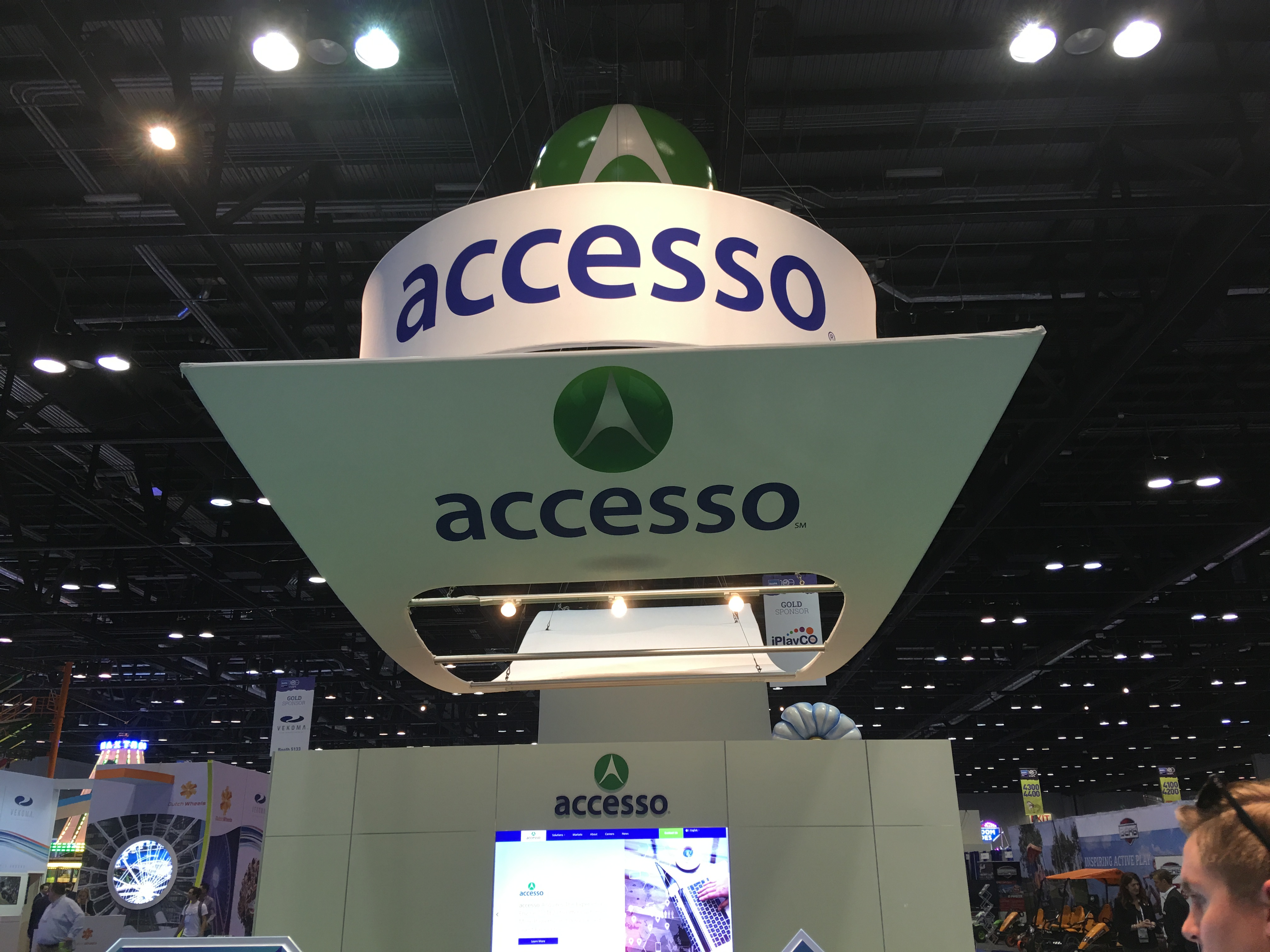
- Accesso booth at IAAPA IAE 2017
- Formerly: Lo-Q
- Company type: Public
- Traded as: LSE: ACSO
- Industry: leisure, cultural, entertainment, theme park, technology
- Predecessor: The Tellurian Devices Company, accesso
- Founded: August 2000; 25 years ago (Lo-Q)
- Founder: Leonard Sim
- Headquarters: Berkshire, England
- Number of locations: 4 Offices Worldwide
- Area served: Worldwide
- Key people: Steve Brown (CEO), Andrew Jacobs (CCO), Fern MacDonald (CFO), Bill Russell (Non-Executive Chairman)
- Services: ticketing, virtual queuing, guest management, eCommerce, access control, reserved seating, box office ticketing, point of sale ticketing, online ticketing, global ticketing distribution
- Revenue: ▲US$118.7 million (2018)
- Operating income: ▲US$88.2 million (2018)
- Net income: ▲US$25.1 million (2018)
- Total assets: ▼US$257.5 million (2018)
- Total equity: ▲US$181.5 million (2018)
- Number of employees: ▼406 Seasonal (2018, avg monthly number); ▲518 Non-seasonal (2018, avg monthly number)
- Divisions: accesso LoQueue accesso Passport accesso ShoWare accesso Siriusware; Ingresso; The Experience Engine (TE2)
- Subsidiaries: Located in Europe and North America and Australia
- Website: www.accesso.com

Accesso Technology Group PLC (formerly Lo-Q) is a publicly listed technology company based in Berkshire, England. Accesso has 9 offices across the world, and serves 1000 venues, providing ticketing, point of sale, virtual queuing, distribution and guest experience management services.

== History ==
Accesso was established around 2000, and entered bankruptcy almost immediately. The company then reemerged in 2007.

In 2012, Lo-Q PLC acquired the Lake Mary, Florida-based company, Accesso LLC, for US$22 million. At the time, Lo-Q focused on developing ride-reservation systems for theme parks, while accesso focused on online and mobile ticket sales software and the management of online ticket stores. Tom Burnet was the CEO of Lo-Q and retained this role after the merger. Accesso's CEO and owner Steve Brown joined the board of the new company and became the COO of North American operations.

In November 2013, Lo-Q was renamed accesso to reflect the company's operations. In December 2013, accesso acquired for US$12 million Taos, New Mexico-based ticketing and point-of-sale software provider Siriusware. On 10 November 2014, accesso acquired VisionOne and their ShoWare ticketing product, a cloud-based ticket sales product. On 30 March 2017, accesso acquired Ingresso, a global distribution system for entertainment ticketing. Later in 2017, the company acquired The Experience Engine (TE2), a guest experience management company.

In 2014, the company began via a three-year partnership with a South Korean consulting firm.

== Products ==
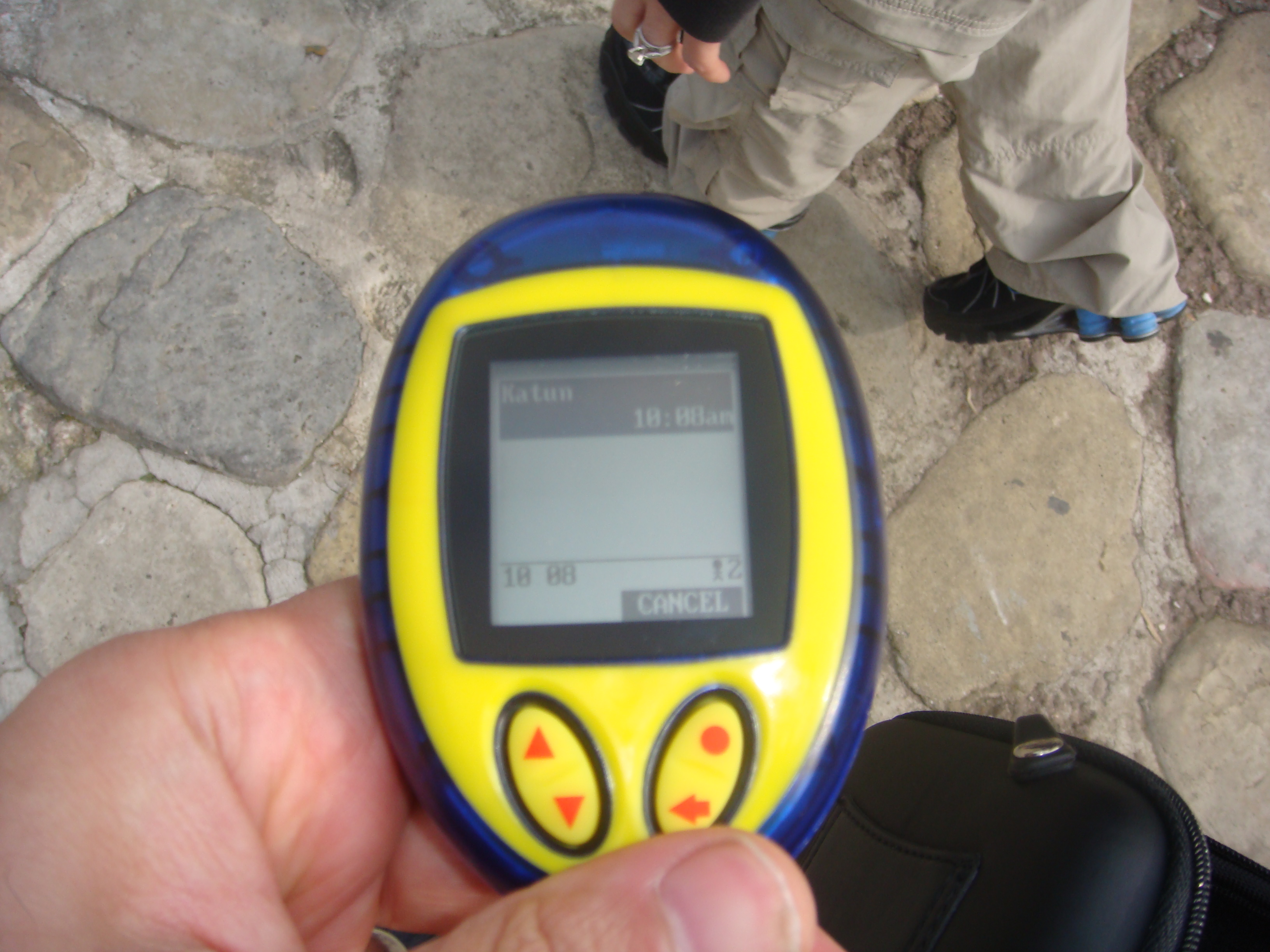
A Qbot at Mirabilandia in Italy

Accesso has products for ticketing, virtual queuing, distribution, guest experience and point of sale.

Accesso'a LoQueue Virtual Queuing was introduced in 2001 and allows guests to wait in virtual lines as opposed to physical ones. Products for virtual queuing include the Qbot (retired), Qband (retired), Qsmart, and Prism. Several patents have been registered for their concepts.

Accesso's Passport ticketing suite is used by venues including Six Flags and Palace Entertainment. In 2015, Merlin Entertainments Group signed a long-term agreement with accesso.

The company's Siriusware ticketing & point of sale provides guest management, ticketing, e-commerce and point-of-sale for venues and attractions. Accesso's ShoWare live entertainment ticketing is cloud-based ticket sales software.
