= Disney PhotoPass =

Professional photography service offered at Disney theme parks

- Type: Professional photography service
- Inception: 2004
- Available: Yes
- Website: Official PhotoPass Website

Disney PhotoPass is a professional photography service offered at Disney theme parks, resorts, and Disney Cruise Line vessels. The service was launched on December 4, 2004, and provides guests with digital photo downloads, print services, and private photography sessions.

== Overview ==
Disney PhotoPass is available to guests visiting Disney theme parks worldwide, with service and operations varying by resort. (Note: Disneyland Resort, Walt Disney World Resort, Tokyo Disneyland Resort or Disneyland Paris Resort.) The basic operation of the services has photos linked directly to a park ticket or MagicBand, which are linked to the guest's Disney account on their resort's mobile application (Note: Applicable to the Walt Disney World Resort in Orlando and the Disneyland Resort in Anaheim.) or via a resort's website. Photographers are positioned at various locations throughout the resorts, mainly inside the theme parks. In Orlando, the service is also offered at certain resort hotels, and dining locations within resort hotels, theme parks, the Bibbidi Bobbidi Boutique at Magic Kingdom and Enchanted Tales with Belle. Photographs are taken at outdoor locations, as well as indoor character meet-and-greets. The service was also formerly available at both Disney's Typhoon Lagoon and Disney's Blizzard Beach water parks at the Walt Disney World Resort, prior to 2020, and is currently only offered during Disney character meet-and-greet encounters at the water parks.

All photos taken by Disney PhotoPass photographers, as well as in-ride photographs and videos, are available for viewing with watermarks for a limited period (varying by resort), while the premium Memory Maker package unlocks photo downloads at the Walt Disney World Resort.

== Services ==
=== Complimentary services ===
Each theme park features a photo imaging center near the entrance for photo viewing, assistance and printing, as well as a photography studio located at Disney Springs.

At Walt Disney World, in-ride photographs can be viewed at the end of certain attractions, which are linked to the a Disney account by scanning a park ticket or MagicBand to an RFID touchpoint. A majority of attractions enable Bluetooth technology to directly link photos to guests' accounts via a Bluetooth-enabled smartphone or MagicBand. Other attractions exclusively employ this method, such as The Haunted Mansion, Guardians of the Galaxy: Cosmic Rewind and Slinky Dog Dash. Only three attractions at Walt Disney World include in-ride videos along with photographs: The Twilight Zone Tower of Terror, Seven Dwarfs Mine Train, and TRON Lightcycle / Run. At Disneyland Resort, all attractions employ the tap-to-scan method to link photos at the end of the ride experience.

Select photograph locations may include "Magic Shots" that are prompted by photographers, inserting Disney characters or visual effects into the photograph. Some seasonal Magic Shots are also offered throughout the year for holidays such as Christmastime, Valentine's Day, St. Patrick's Day, Independence Day, etc. as well as limited-time for certain Disney anniversaries or occasions. Other "Magic Shots" include an orthographic image taken on a 360° camera with multiple fisheye lenses, and a panoramic/close-up photograph taken from a far distance.

=== Premium services ===
The Memory Maker photo package allows unlimited photo downloads, taken by PhotoPass photographers, and in-ride attraction photos and videos. Disney PhotoPass Lenses launched with the Disney Genie+ service on October 19, 2021, using augmented reality (AR) technology to place characters, themed effects, or animations in the frame, in collaboration with Snapchat. Capture Your Moment is a private 20-minute photography session offered at Walt Disney World Resort and Disneyland Resort, in specific locations within each resort's theme parks.

== Other ==
Although Disney Cruise Line offers photography services in all of their ships, they are offered through a contracted professional photography company. Services similar to PhotoPass are offered onboard, including photo editing and private sessions, however, photos taken on Disney ships are exclusively available for the duration of each itinerary.
