= List of Swarthmore College people =

The following is a list of notable people associated with Swarthmore College, a private, independent liberal arts college located in the borough of Swarthmore, Pennsylvania. Since its founding in 1864, Swarthmore has graduated 156 classes of students. As of 2022, the College enrolls 1,689 students and has roughly 21,300 living alumni.

== Academia ==
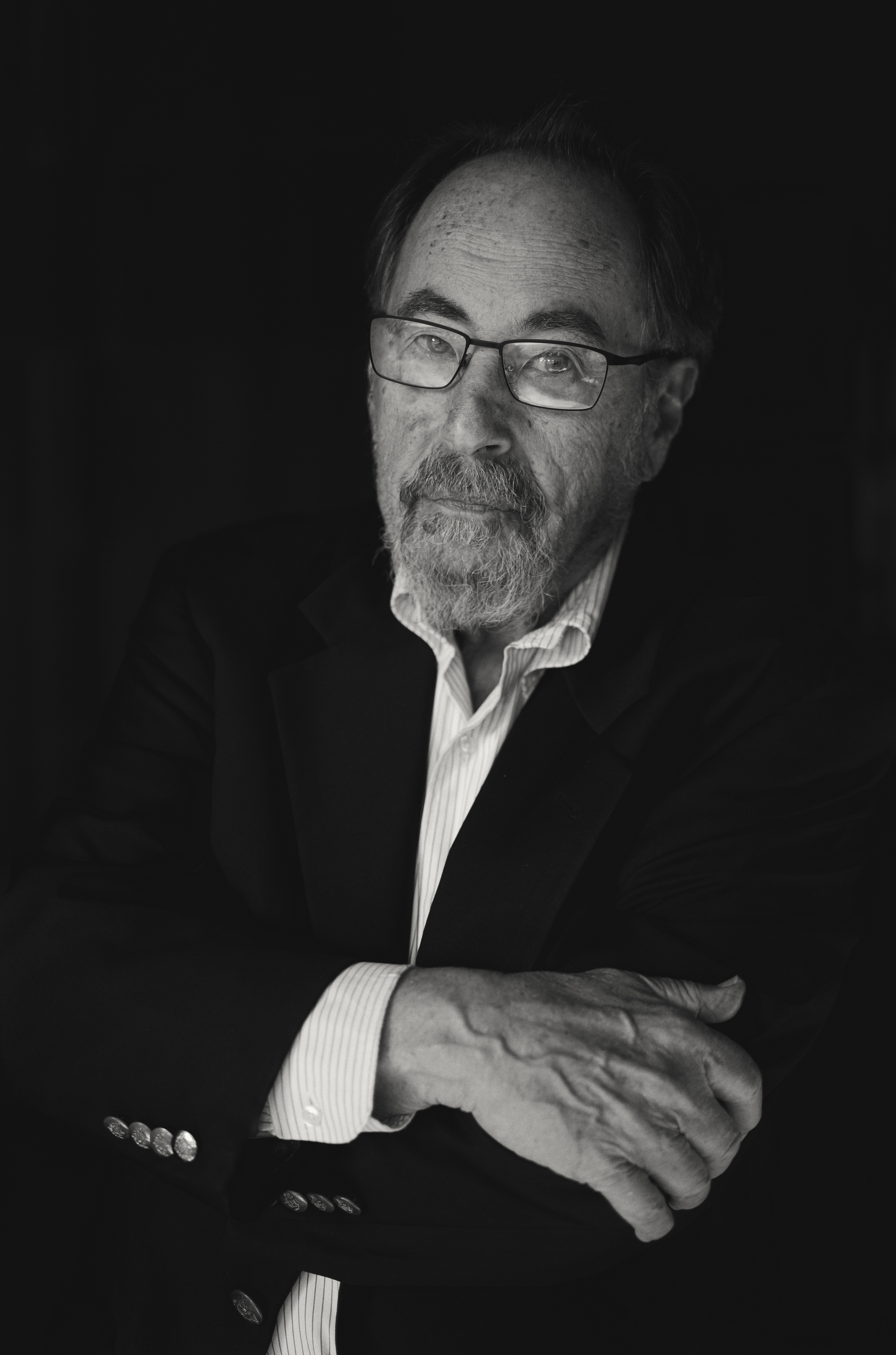
David Baltimore

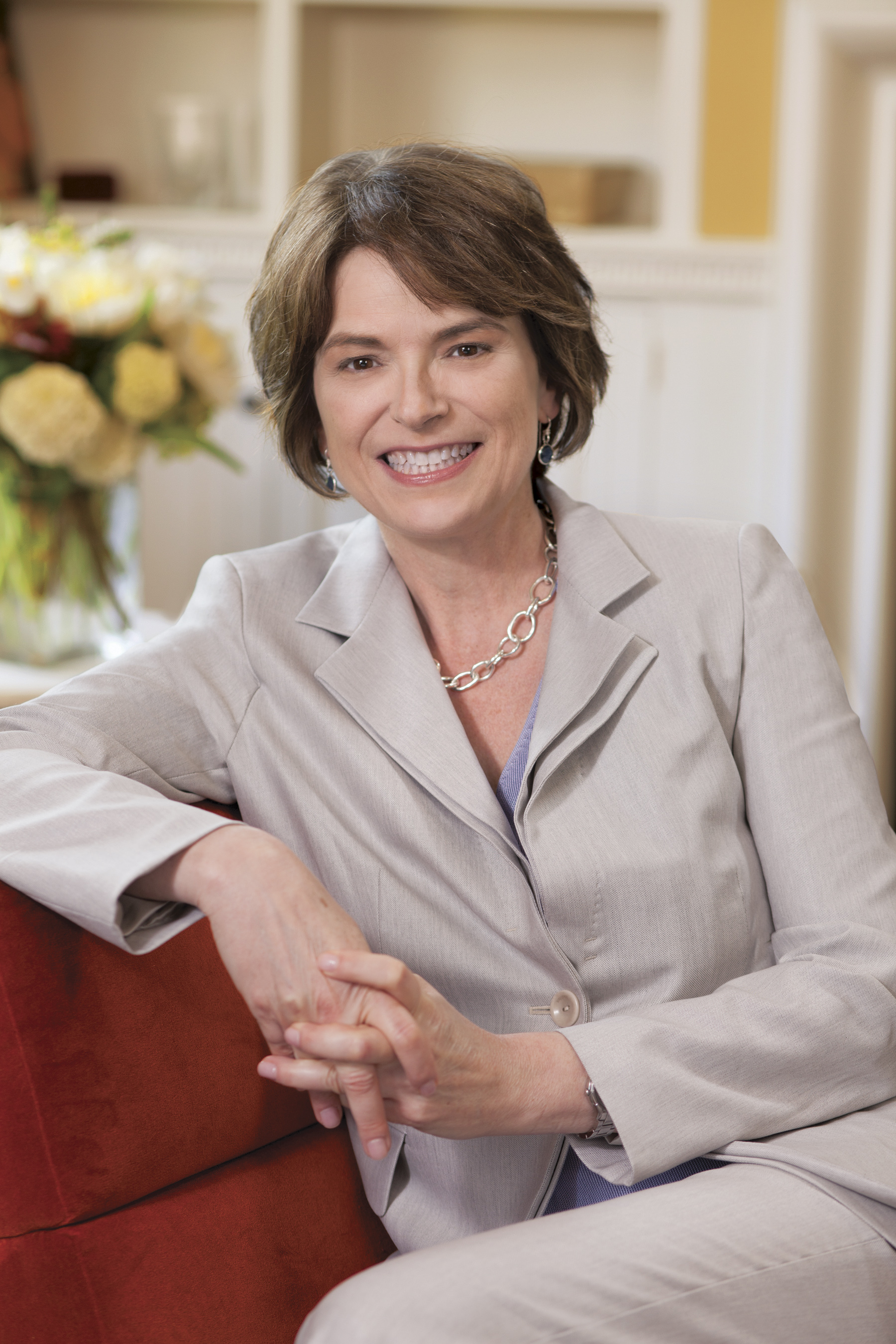
Christina Paxson

=== Presidents ===
- Patrick Awuah Jr. (1988) – president of Ashesi University
- David Baltimore (1960) – president of California Institute of Technology; recipient of the Nobel Prize in Physiology or Medicine in 1975
- Nancy Y. Bekavac – first female president of Scripps College
- Detlev Bronk (1920) – former president of Johns Hopkins University and the National Academy of Sciences
- Mary Schmidt Campbell – president of Spelman College
- Kimberly Wright Cassidy – president of Bryn Mawr College
- Sean M. Decatur – president of Kenyon College
- Neil Grabois – president of Colgate University and former provost of Williams College
- Tori Haring-Smith – president of Washington and Jefferson College
- Clark Kerr (1932) – first chancellor of the University of California, Berkeley; president of the University of California
- Richard Wall Lyman – former president of Stanford University
- Christina Hull Paxson (1982) – president of Brown University
- David H. Porter (1958) – former president of Skidmore College
- Susan Poser (1985) – president of Hofstra University
- Robert Prichard – former president of the University of Toronto
- Lawrence Schall (1975) – president of Oglethorpe University
- Alan Valentine – former president of the University of Rochester

=== Provosts ===
- Paul Courant – provost of the University of Michigan
- Phyllis Wise – provost of the University of Washington

=== Deans ===
- T. Alexander Aleinikoff (1974) – dean of the Georgetown University Law Center
- William Boulding – dean of the Fuqua School of Business
- Christopher Edley Jr. (1973) – dean of the UC Berkeley School of Law
- Frances Halsband (1965) – former dean of the School of Architecture at Pratt Institute
- James C. Hormel (1955) – former dean of the University of Chicago Law School
- Stewart J. Schwab (1975) – dean and professor of law at the Cornell Law School
- Daniel L. Schwartz (1979) – dean of the Stanford University Graduate School of Education

=== Department directors and chairs ===
- Adrienne Asch – founding director of the Center for Ethics at Yeshiva University
- Anne Pippin Burnett (1946) – chair of the Department of Classical Languages at the University of Chicago
- Marjorie Garber – director of the Humanities Center at Harvard University; Shakespeare scholar
- Jeffrey Miron (1979) – chairman of the Department of Economics at Boston University; director of undergraduate studies at Harvard University; director of economic studies at the Cato Institute
- David Page (1978) – professor of biology at the Massachusetts Institute of Technology; director of Whitehead Institute for Biomedical Research
- Hans Stoll (1962) – professor of finance and director of the Financial Markets Research Center at the Owen Graduate School of Management
- Robert Storr (1972) – dean of the Yale School of Art; curator
- Christopher Udry (1981) – professor of economics at Northwestern University; co-founder and co-director of the Global Poverty Research Lab at the Kellogg School of Management

=== Professors ===
- Ted Abel – professor of biology at the University of Pennsylvania
- Elizabeth S. Anderson (1981) – professor of philosophy and women's studies at University of Michigan; MacArthur Fellow 2019
- Margaret L. Anderson – historian and professor at University of California, Berkeley
- Dave Bayer – professor of mathematics at Barnard College
- Leo Braudy (1963) – professor of English and American literature at the University of Southern California
- Christopher Chyba (1982) – professor of astrophysical sciences and international affairs at the Princeton School of Public and International Affairs
- Robert Cooter (1967) – professor at UC Berkeley School of Law
- Christina Crosby – professor of English, feminist, gender, and sexuality studies at Wesleyan University
- Pamela Kyle Crossley – professor of history Dartmouth College
- Paul Crowell – professor of physics at the University of Minnesota
- Philip Curtin (1948) – distinguished professor of African history at Johns Hopkins University
- Jonathan Dewald – professor of history at State University of New York at Buffalo
- Cora Diamond – emeritus professor of philosophy at the University of Virginia
- Bruce T. Draine – professor of astrophysical sciences at Princeton University
- Lara Estroff – materials scientist and professor at Cornell University
- Sandra Faber (1966) – professor of astronomy and astrophysics at the University of California, Santa Cruz
- Andre Gunder Frank (1950) – professor of sociology and economics at the University of Chile; developer of dependency theory and world-systems theory
- Sorelle Friedler (2004) – professor of computer science at Haverford College, former assistant director for data and democracy in the White House Office of Science and Technology Policy
- Anna M. Gade (1989) – professor of religion, ethics and environment at University of Wisconsin
- Paul M. Gaston (1952) – civil rights activist and professor of history at the University of Virginia
- Robert P. George – professor at Princeton University
- Neil Gershenfeld – associate professor of media arts and sciences at Massachusetts Institute of Technology
- Allan Gibbard (1963) – professor of philosophy emeritus at the University of Michigan
- Ruth Wilson Gilmore – professor of geography in at the Graduate Center of the City University of New York
- William H. Green – professor of chemical engineering at Massachusetts Institute of Technology
- Michael Greenstone (1991) – professor of environmental economics at the Massachusetts Institute of Technology, director of the Hamilton Project
- Michael Hardt – professor of literature at Duke University; author of Empire
- Gilbert Harman – professor of philosophy of Princeton University
- Geoffrey C. Hazard Jr. – law professor
- Daniel R. Headrick – historian and professor at Roosevelt University, Tuskegee University, and Hawaii Pacific University
- Arlie Russell Hochschild – sociologist, author, and professor emeritus of sociology at the University of California, Berkeley
- John Hopfield (1954) – professor of molecular biology at Princeton University; recipient of the Nobel Prize in Physics in 2024
- Alexander Huk – professor of neuroscience at the University of Texas at Austin
- Ray Jackendoff – professor of linguistics at Tufts University
- Pieter Judson – history professor at the European University Institute
- Pinar Karaca-Mandic (1998) – health economist and professor of management at Carlson School of Management
- Peter J. Katzenstein (1967) – professor of International Studies at Cornell University; member of the Council on Foreign Relations
- Joshua Landis (1979) – professor in Middle East Studies at the University of Oklahoma
- Thomas W. Laqueur – historian, sexologist, and professor at the University of California, Berkeley
- Sara Lawrence-Lightfoot (1966) – professor of education at Harvard Graduate School of Education
- David Lewis (1962) – professor of philosophy at Princeton University, rated as one of the fifteen most important philosophers in the past 200 years
- Linda Datcher Loury (1973) – social economist and professor at Tufts University
- Robert MacPherson (1966) – mathematician at the Institute for Advanced Study and Princeton University; recipient of the National Academy of Sciences Award in Mathematics (1992)
- Rogers McVaugh – research professor of botany and curator at the University of North Carolina at Chapel Hill; professor emeritus of botany in the University of Michigan, Ann Arbor
- Eben Moglen (1980) – professor of law and legal history at Columbia University
- David Montgomery – professor of history at Yale University
- John H. Morrow Jr. – professor of history at the University of Georgia
- Alexander Nehamas – professor of humanities and comparative literature at Princeton University
- Rebecca J. Nelson (1982) – professor of plant pathology at Cornell University
- Barbara Partee – emeritus professor of linguistics and philosophy at the University of Massachusetts Amherst
- Edward C. Prescott (1962) – economist associated with Carnegie Mellon University and the Australian National University; winner of 2004 Nobel Memorial Prize in Economics
- Robert D. Putnam – social capital theorist and Harvard University professor; author of Bowling Alone
- Jane S. Richardson (1962) – Duke University biochemistry professor; inventor of Ribbon diagrams
- William Rubinstein – professor of history at Deakin University and the University of Wales
- Michael Schudson (1969) – professor of journalism at Columbia University
- Nayan Shah – history professor at the University of California at San Diego
- Herbert W. Smyth (1876) – professor of classics whose comprehensive grammar of Ancient Greek has become a standard reference
- Karen B. Strier – professor of biological anthropology at the University of Wisconsin–Madison
- Daniel F. Styer (Ph.D. 1983) – professor of physics at Oberlin College
- Joseph Takahashi – neuroscientist and professor at Northwestern University
- Peter Temin (1959) – economic historian, professor of economics at Massachusetts Institute of Technology
- Peter Unger – professor of philosophy at New York University
- Elizabeth R. Varon – professor of history at University of Virginia
- Emma Vyssotsky – astronomer at the University of Virginia
- E. Roy Weintraub (1964) – professor of economics at Duke University
- Martin Weitzman (1963) – professor of economics at Harvard University
- Helen Magill White – first woman in the US to earn a Ph.D., professor at Evelyn College for Women, organizer of Howard Collegiate Institute
- Gavin Wright (1965) – professor of economics at Stanford University
- Miles Yu – professor of military history and modern China at the United States Naval Academy
- Tara Zahra (1988) – history professor at the University of Chicago

=== Other ===
- Albert Cook Myers – secretary of the Pennsylvania State Historical Commission
- Brian Tomasik (2009) – researcher and ethicist with the Center on Long-Term Risk

== Architecture ==
- Margaret Helfand (non-degreed) – architect
- Steven Izenour (non-degreed) – architect with Venturi, Scott Brown & Associates; co-author of Learning from Las Vegas
- Marianne McKenna (1972) – architect

== Art ==
- Bruce Cratsley (1966) – photographer specialized in still lifes, portraits of friends, and gay life in New York City
- Njideka Akunyili Crosby (2004) – visual artist
- Alexandra Grant (1994) – visual artist
- Richard Martin (1967) – art and fashion historian; former curator-in-chief of the Costume Institute at the Metropolitan Museum of Art
- Robert C. Turner (1969) – ceramic artist

== Business and finance ==
- Danna Azrieli – chair of Azrieli Group
- Dean Baker (1981) – macroeconomist; co-founder and co-director of the Center for Economic and Policy Research
- Bridget Boakye – Ghanaian entrepreneur
- Paul Booth – labor leader, executive assistant to the president of American Federation of State, County and Municipal Employees
- Peter Cohan (1979) – president of Peter S. Cohan & Associates
- John Diebold (1949) – founder of Diebold Group, Diebold, Inc., and the Diebold Institute for Public Policy
- John D. Goldman (1971) – CEO of Richard N. Goldman & Co. Insurance Services
- Rachel Jacobs (1997) – CEO of ApprenNet
- William N. Kinnard (1947) – author, lecturer, and expert on the topic of real estate valuation
- Jerome Kohlberg, Jr. (1946) – co-founder of Kohlberg Kravis Roberts & Co.
- Eugene M. Lang (1938) – founder of REFAC Technology Development Corporation
- Nick Martin (2004) – founder and CEO of TechChange
- Thomas B. McCabe (1915) – chairman of the Federal Reserve Board of Governors; president of Scott Paper
- Arthur S. Obermayer (1952) – founder of the Moleculon Research Corporation
- Karen Pence (1992) – deputy associate director of the Federal Reserve Board of Governors
- William Poole (1959) – eleventh president of the Federal Reserve Bank of St. Louis
- Thomas Rowe Price Jr. (1919) – founder of T. Rowe Price
- Iqbal Quadir (1982) – founder of Gonofone and GrameenPhone
- Sam Schulhofer-Wohl (1998) – senior vice president and director of financial policy of the Federal Reserve Bank of Chicago
- Kate Warne (1976) – principal and investment strategist with Edward Jones Investments
- Robert Zoellick (1976) – former president of the World Bank

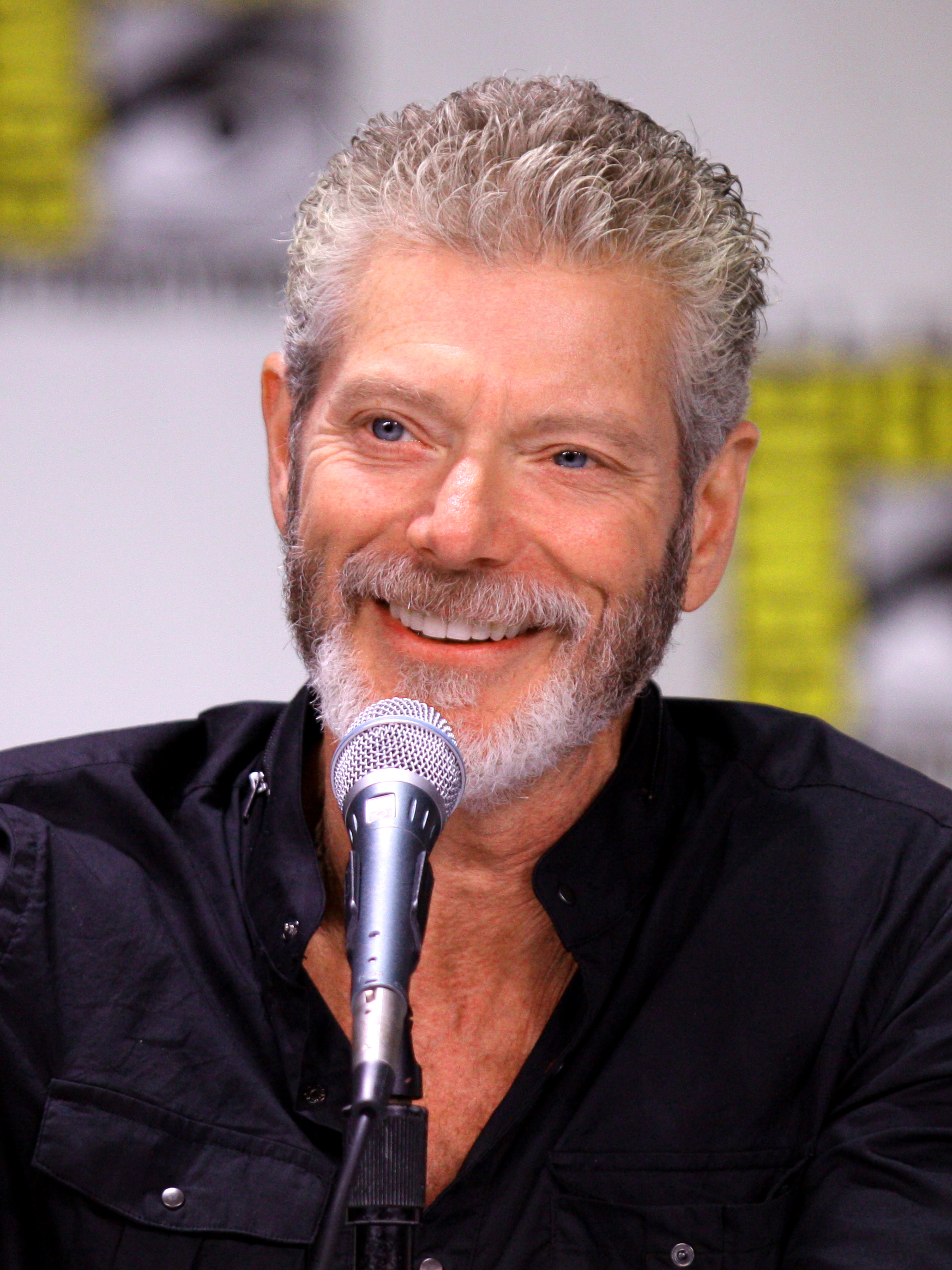
Stephen Lang

== Entertainment ==
- Lisa Albert (1981) – Emmy Award-winning television producer and writer, known for Mad Men, Beautiful People, Living Single, Becker, Murphy Brown, Major Dad
- Mark Alburger (1979) – composer; founder, and music director of the San Francisco Composers Chamber Orchestra; music director of Goat Hall Productions
- Carol Black – Emmy Award-winning creator, writer, and producer of The Wonder Years and Ellen
- Joseph Altuzarra (2005) – fashion designer, winner of the 2011 CFDA/Vogue Fashion Fund Award
- Heywood Hale Broun – sportswriter and CBS Sports commentator
- Al Carmines (1958) – composer of Off-Broadway musicals
- Marshall Curry (1992) – Academy Award-winning documentary filmmaker of Street Fight, If a Tree Falls: A Story of the Earth Liberation Front, Racing Dreams, and Point and Shoot
- David Dye (1972) – radio personality and host of the World Cafe
- Steven Gilborn (1969) – actor
- Andrew Rose Gregory (2004) – member of The Gregory Brothers
- Evan Gregory (2001) – member of The Gregory Brothers
- Grant S. Johnson (2014) – filmmaker
- Nicholas Kazan (1969) – screenwriter
- H. C. Robbins Landon (1946) – musicologist
- Stephen Lang (1972) – Tony Award-nominated actor and playwright; known for Avatar, Gods and Generals, Gettysburg, Tombstone, and Terra Nova
- Cynthia Ling Lee – dancer, choreographer, and dance scholar
- Michael Lessac (1961) – theater, television, film director, and screenwriter.
- David Linde (1982) – film producer; co-founder of Focus Features; co-chair of Universal Studios
- Beth Littleford (non-degreed) – actress, former The Daily Show correspondent
- Dana Lyons (1982) – independent singer/songwriter
- François Picard (1988) – journalist who hosts The Debate and The World This Week
- Dawn Porter (1988) – documentary filmmaker, director of Gideon's Army
- Peter Schickele (1957) – Grammy Award-winning music composer and satirist, often under the comic pseudonym P. D. Q. Bach
- Aaron Schwartz (1970) – actor and director
- Tom Snyder (1972) – television producer and founder of Soup2Nuts animation studio
- Darko Tresnjak (1988) – Tony Award-winning director
- Michael J. Weithorn (1978) – television producer and writer for The King of Queens, Family Ties, Ned & Stacey, The Goldbergs
- Jenny Yang – writer and comedian
- Michał Zadara (1999) – theatre director

== Law ==
- Ellen Barry (1975) – prison reform advocate; founder of Legal Services for Prisoners with Children and the National Network for Women in Prison
- Frank H. Easterbrook (1970) – judge with the United States Court of Appeals for the Seventh Circuit
- Arianna Freeman (2001) – judge with the United States Court of Appeals for the Third Circuit
- Eilene Galloway (1928) – space law researcher and editor; also taught at the college for two years
- Wilma A. Lewis (1978) – former United States attorney for the District of Columbia
- Lara Montecalvo (1996) – judge with the United States Court of Appeals for the First Circuit
- Alexander Mitchell Palmer (1891) – United States attorney general
- Ellen Ash Peters (1951) – chief justice of the Connecticut Supreme Court
- Jed S. Rakoff (1964) – judge on the United States District Court for the Southern District of New York
- Charles F.C. Ruff (1960) – special prosecutor during the Watergate scandal, defender of Anita Hill during confirmation hearings for Clarence Thomas, and counsel to president Bill Clinton during the Lewinsky scandal
- Mary M. Schroeder (1962) – chief judge with the United States Court of Appeals for the Ninth Circuit
- Mark D. Schwartz (1975) – attorney in private practice; first vice president of Prudential-Bache Securities's public-finance department
- Phil Weiser – Colorado attorney general and governor-elect of Colorado
- Jennifer P. Wilson (1997) – judge of the United States District Court for the Middle District of Pennsylvania

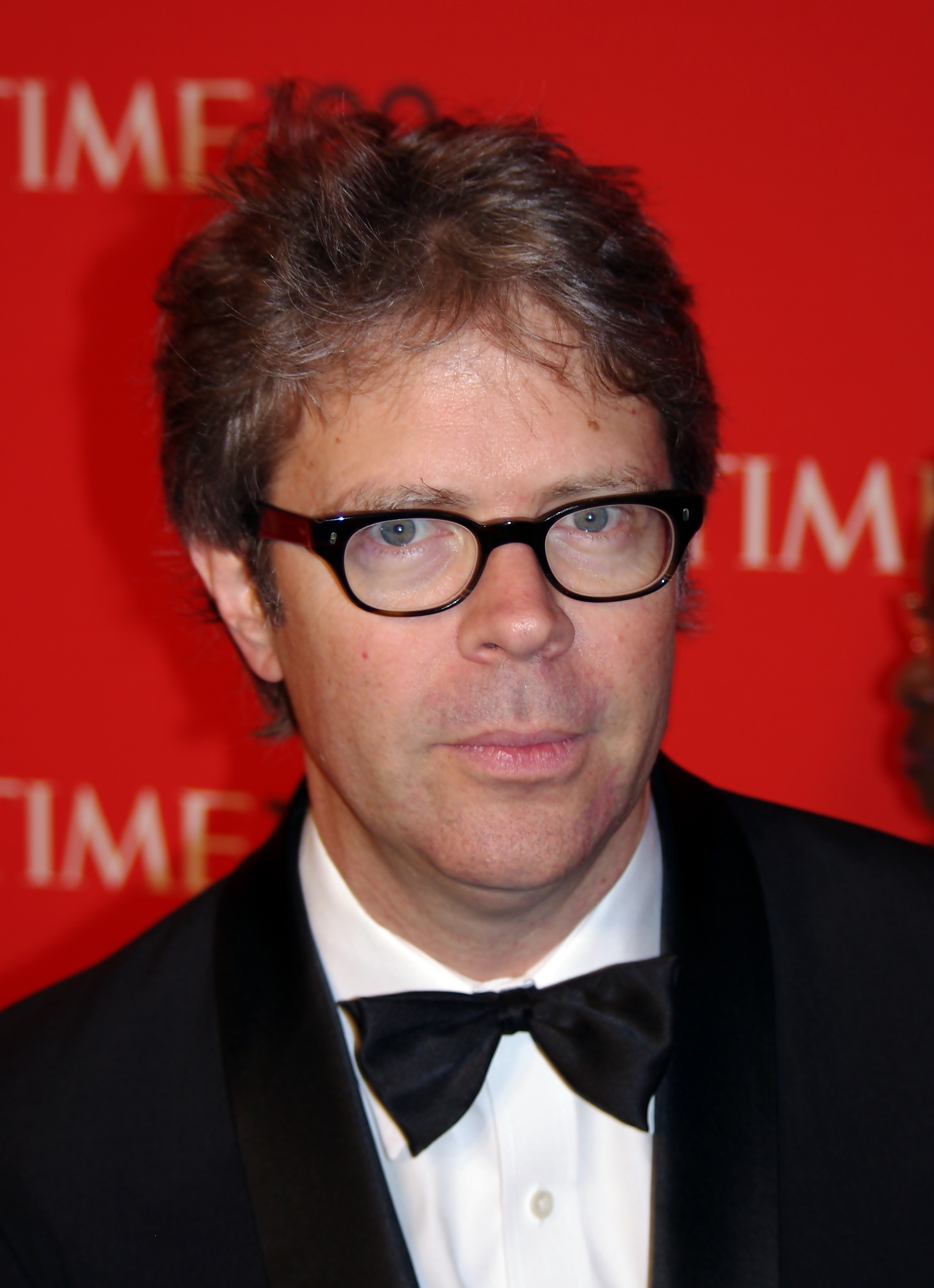
Jonathan Franzen

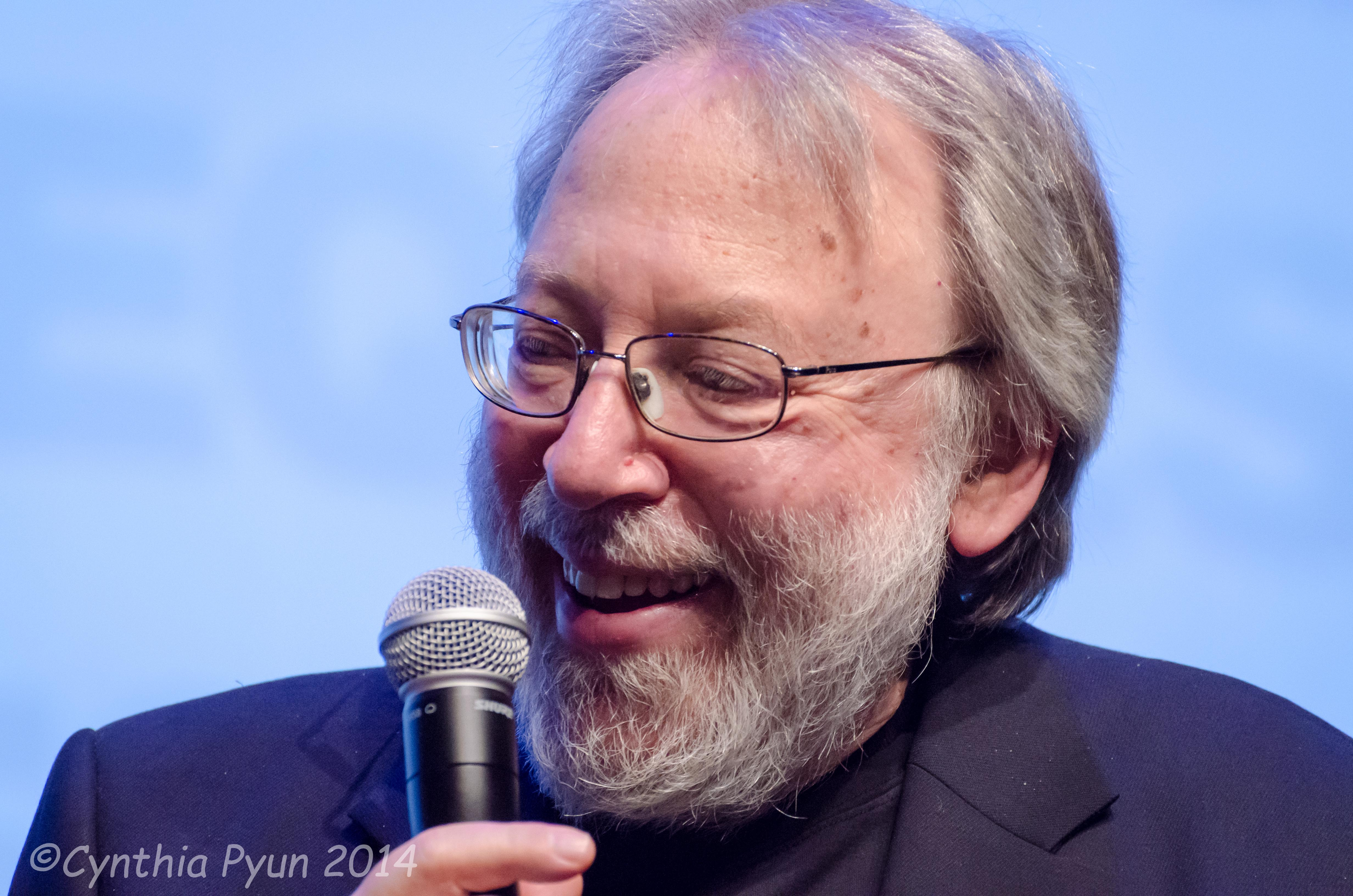
Kenneth Turan

== Literature and journalism ==
- Eliot Asinof – writer, especially about baseball
- Peter Bart – vice president and editor-in-chief of Variety
- Lauren Belfer – author of novel City of Light
- Peter Biskind – author of Easy Riders, Raging Bulls
- David G. Bradley – chair of The Atlantic Monthly and National Journal Group, Inc.
- Ben Brantley – chief theater critic of The New York Times
- Christopher Castellani – author
- Arthur Chu – columnist
- Amy Fine Collins – author and contributor at Vanity Fair
- Linda Grant DePauw – historian and author
- Diane Di Prima – Beat Generation poet
- Kurt Eichenwald – reporter with The New York Times and author of books on white-collar crime
- Julie Falk (1998) – executive director of Bitch magazine
- Jessica Fisher – poet, translator, critic; winner of the Rome Prize and Yale Series of Younger Poets
- Michael Forster Rothbart (1994) – photojournalist
- Jonathan Franzen (1981) – novelist, essayist, and author of The Corrections; winner of the 2001 National Book Award for Fiction
- John Freeman (1996) – writer, literary critic, former editor of Granta, and executive editor at Alfred A. Knopf
- Daisy Fried (1989) – poet
- Gregory Gibson – author
- Linda Gordon – historian and author
- Justin Hall – pioneer blogger
- Adam Haslett (1992) – short story writer and author; Pulitzer Prize finalist and National Book Award finalist
- John Russell Hayes (1888) – poet and librarian
- Marni Hodgkin – children's book editor
- Anick Jesdanun (1991) – technology reporter, editor, and the first Internet writer for the Associated Press
- Josef Joffe – editor in chief of Die Zeit
- Arnold Kling (1975) – founder and co-editor of EconLog
- Christopher Lehmann-Haupt – journalist, book review and obituary editor for The New York Times
- Cynthia Leive – editor in chief of Glamour
- Helen Reimensnyder Martin – novelist
- Daniel Menaker – fiction editor for The New Yorker and executive editor-in-chief of Random House
- James A. Michener (1929) – novelist
- Lulu Miller – writer, artist, and science reporter for National Public Radio
- Victor Navasky – publisher and editorial director of The Nation and chair of Columbia Journalism Review
- Robert L. Patten – writer
- Yongsoo Park (1994) – novelist
- Drew Pearson – journalist
- Julie Phillips – journalist, writer, and biographer
- Rowan Ricardo Phillips – poet and writer
- Jonathan Raymond – novelist and short story writer
- Rishi Reddi – short story writer
- Rudy Rucker – cyberpunk novelist; winner of two Philip K. Dick Award
- Norman Rush – novelist, winner of the 1991 National Book Award for Mating
- William Saletan – author and chief national correspondent for Slate
- Jonathan Shainin (2000) – head of opinion at The Guardian
- Anna Shechtman – journalist and crossword compiler
- Kenneth Turan (1967) – film critic for the Los Angeles Times
- Mark Vonnegut – physician and author of the memoir of schizophrenia, The Eden Express
- Nora Waln – journalist and memoirist on China and Nazi Germany
- Paul Williams (1969) – founder and publisher of Crawdaddy!
- Mary Wiltenburg – journalist
- Valerie Worth – poet and writer

== Medicine ==
- Margaret Allen – first female heart transplant surgeon
- Marcella Nunez-Smith – physician and co-chair of the COVID-19 Advisory Board
- Frank Oski – director of pediatrics at Johns Hopkins School of Medicine
- Anne Schuchat – acting director of the National Center for Infectious Diseases, Centers for Disease Control
- Howard Martin Temin (1955) – recipient of the Nobel Prize in Physiology or Medicine in 1975

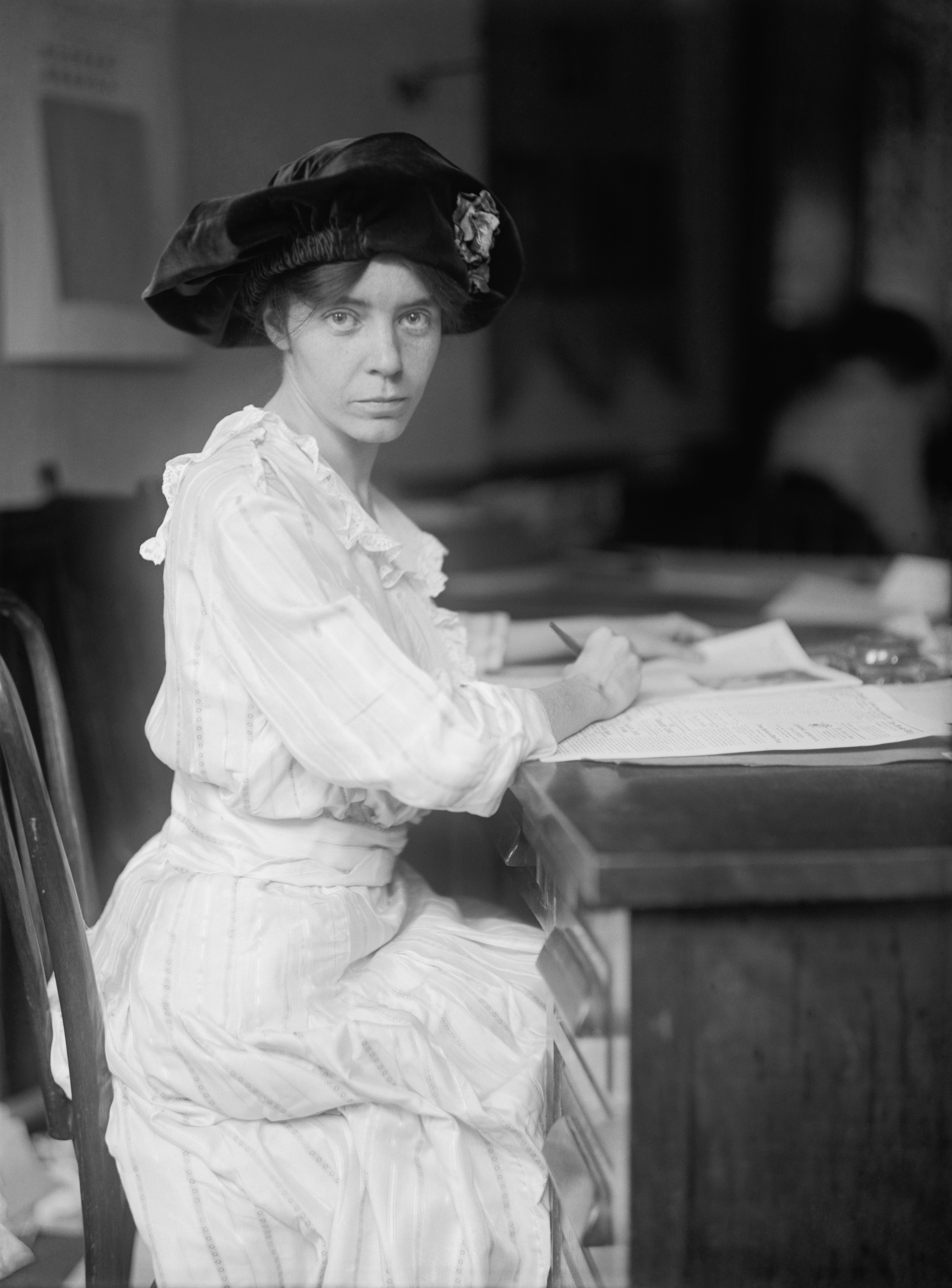
Alice Paul

== Philanthropy and activism ==
- M. Evelyn Killen – president of Delaware State Woman's Christian Temperance Union
- Eugene M. Lang – founder of the I Have A Dream Foundation
- Alice Paul (1905) – women's suffrage leader, National Woman's Party founder, and author of first Equal Rights Amendment proposal
- Micah White – creator of Occupy Wall Street
- Cathy Wilkerson – activist and former member of the Weather Underground
- Carl Wittman – LGBT rights activist and member of the national council of Students for a Democratic Society
- Molly Yard – former president of the National Organization for Women

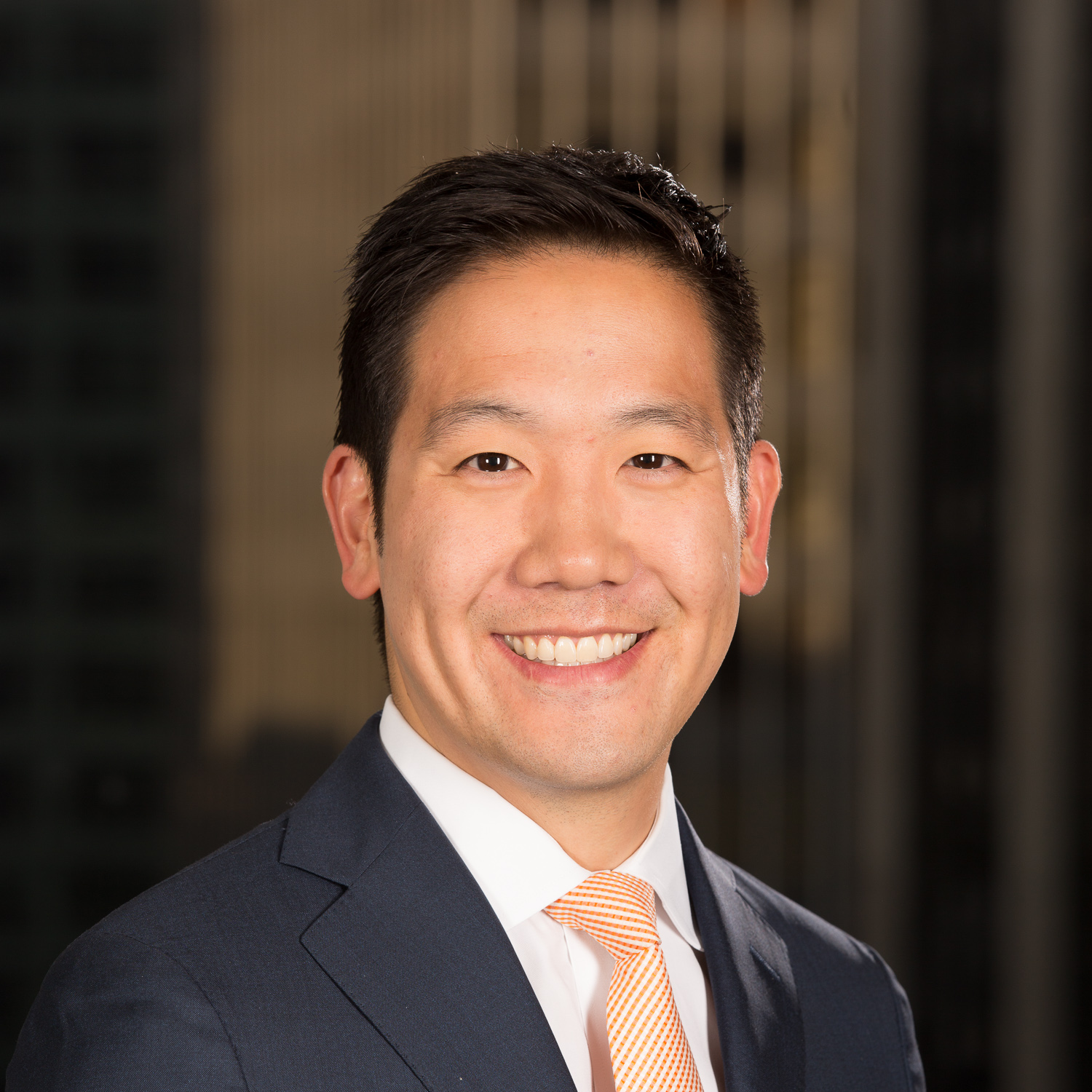
Dennis Cheng

== Politics ==
- Samuel Assefa – Ethiopian ambassador to the United States
- Erica Barks-Ruggles – U.S. ambassador to Rwanda
- Peter Berkowitz – director of Policy Planning at the United States Department of State
- William H. Brown, Jr. – Parliamentarian of the United States House of Representatives
- Armond Budish – Ohio House of Representatives
- Dennis Cheng (2001) – national finance director of the 2016 presidential campaign of Hillary Clinton
- David L. Cohen (1977) – U.S. ambassador to Canada
- Scott Cowger – Maine House of Representatives and Maine Senate
- Peter Deutsch – United States House of Representatives
- Michael Dukakis – governor of Massachusetts; Democratic nominee in the 1988 presidential election
- Christiana Figueres (1979) – Costa Rican diplomat, executive secretary of the UN Framework Convention on Climate Change
- Diana Furchtgott-Roth (1979) – former chief economist of the United States Department of Labor, former chief of staff of the Council of Economic Advisers, senior fellow at Manhattan Institute for Policy Research
- Josh Green (1992) – governor of Hawaii and lieutenant governor of Hawaii
- Kevin Hassett (1984) – chair of the Council of Economic Advisers
- Leon Henderson – administrator of the Office of Price Administration
- Rush Holt Jr. – United States House of Representatives
- James Hormel – former U.S. ambassador to Luxembourg
- John Brady Kiesling – writer, former U.S. diplomat
- William Lawrence (2013), representative-elect for Michigan
- Carl Levin (1956) – United States Senate
- Mary B. Newman – member of the Massachusetts House of Representatives
- Amos J. Peaslee – U.S. ambassador to Australia
- Antoinette Sayeh – minister of Finance, Liberia
- William C. Sproul – governor of Pennsylvania
- Chris Van Hollen – United States senator and United States House of Representatives
- James M. Wilson Jr. – U.S. assistant secretary of state

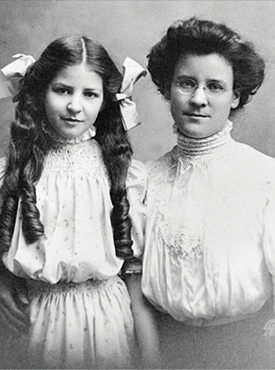
Isabel Briggs Myers

== Psychology ==
- Bird Thomas Baldwin – psychologist; pioneer in child development
- Adele Diamond – pioneer in developmental cognitive neuroscience
- Ward Edwards – psychologist; pioneer in decision analysis
- Eugene Galanter – pioneer in cognitive psychology and psychometrics
- Carol Gilligan (1958) – feminist, ethicist, and psychologist
- Rachel Hare-Mustin – feminist psychologist
- Isabel Briggs Myers (1919) – co-creator of the Myers–Briggs Type Indicator assessment
- Robert Rescorla – co-creator of the Rescorla-Wagner model

== Science and technology ==
- Christian B. Anfinsen (1937) – recipient of the Nobel Prize in Chemistry in 1972
- Frank Hastings Griffin (1910) – chemist who invented rayon
- Tyler Lyson (2006) – curator of vertebrate paleontology at the Denver Museum of Nature and Science
- Holbrook Mann MacNeille – mathematician; scientific director of the Office of Scientific Research and Development; chief of the fundamental research branch of the United States Atomic Energy Commission
- John C. Mather (1968) – senior astrophysicist at Goddard Space Flight Center; recipient of the 2006 Nobel Prize in Physics
- Newton Morton – population geneticist, one of the founders of the field of genetic epidemiology
- Ted Nelson (1959) – pioneer of information technology, computer visionary who coined the terms "hypertext" and "hypermedia".
- G. Raymond Rettew – chemist; pioneered mass production of penicillin during World War II
- Sally Ride (non-graduate) – NASA astronaut and physicist, first American woman in space
- Nancy Roman (1946) – NASA's first chief of astronomy in the Office of Space Science, considered the "mother of the Hubble Space Telescope"
- Maxine Frank Singer – biochemist and president of the Carnegie Institution of Washington
- Charlotte Moore Sitterly (1920) – astronomer who identified chemical elements in the sun using spectroscopy
- Peter J. Weinberger (1964) – computer scientist; former head of CS research at Bell Labs; inventor of the AWK programming language

== Sports ==
- Ed Ayres (1963) – ultramarathon runner; winner of JFK 50 Mile; editor and publisher of Running Times magazine
- Robin Carpenter (2014) – professional road cyclist
- Ben Clime – professional football player
- Eran Ganot – college basketball head coach at the University of Hawaii
- Dick Hall – former Major League Baseball pitcher; appeared in three World Series for the Baltimore Orioles
- Morgan Langley – professional soccer player with the Philadelphia Union
- Ladule Lako LoSarah – international footballer for the Republic of South Sudan
- Lee MacPhail (1939) – baseball executive, former president of American League; inducted into the Baseball Hall of Fame
- Tiny Maxwell – College Football Hall of Fame player and referee
- Curly Ogden – professional baseball pitcher
- Jack Ogden – professional baseball player

== Swarthmore faculty and staff ==
As of spring 2022, Swarthmore employs nearly 200 faculty members.

=== Presidents of Swarthmore College ===
- Edward Parrish, 1865–1871
- Edward Hicks Magill, 1871–1889
- William Hyde Appleton, 1889–1891
- Charles De Garmo, 1891–1898
- William W. Birdsall, 1898–1902
- Joseph Swain, 1902–1921
- Frank Aydelotte, 1921–1940
- John W. Nason, 1940–1953
- Courtney C. Smith, 1953–1969
- Robert D. Cross, 1969–1971
- Theodore W. Friend, 1973–1982
- David W. Fraser, 1982–1991
- Alfred H. Bloom, 1991–2009
- Rebecca Chopp, 2009–2014
- Valerie Smith, 2015–2027 (Note: Val Smith announced in February of 2026 that she would step down as president of Swarthmore, effective June 2027.)

=== Current faculty ===
- Alan Baker, philosophy
- Amanda Bayer, economics
- Rodney Evans, film and media studies
- Theodore B. Fernald, linguistics
- K. David Harrison, linguistics and cognitive science
- Aimee Johnson, mathematics and statistics
- Donna Jo Napoli, linguistics
- Chinelo Okparanta, English literature
- Ron Tarver, art and art history
- Mark I. Wallace, religion, environmental studies

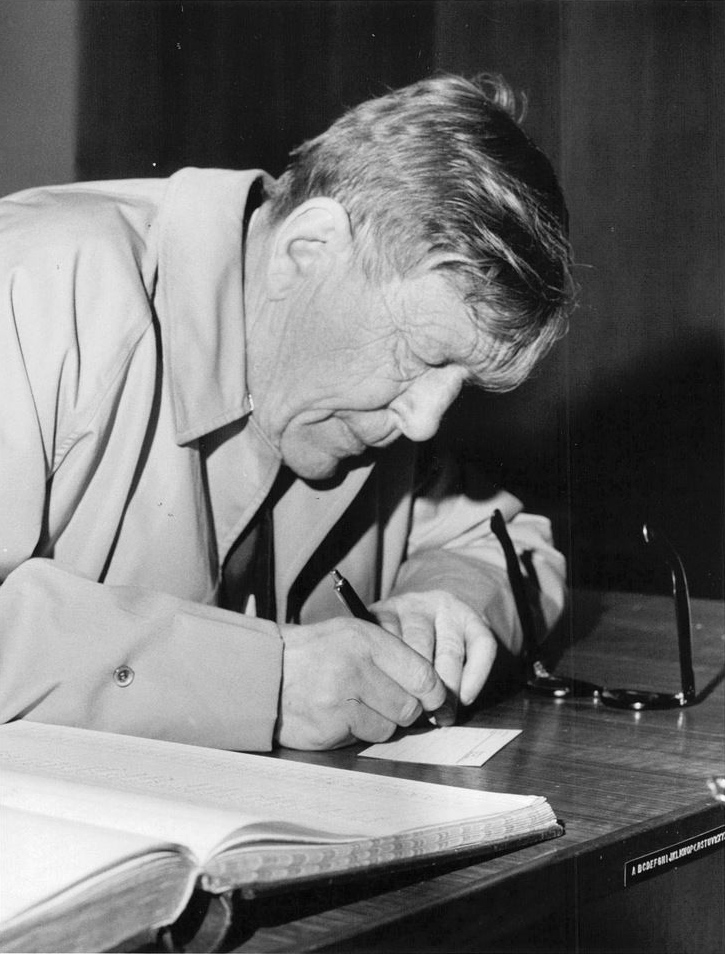
W. H. Auden

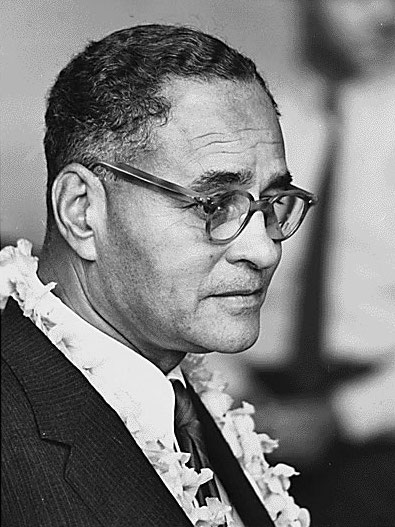
Ralph Bunche

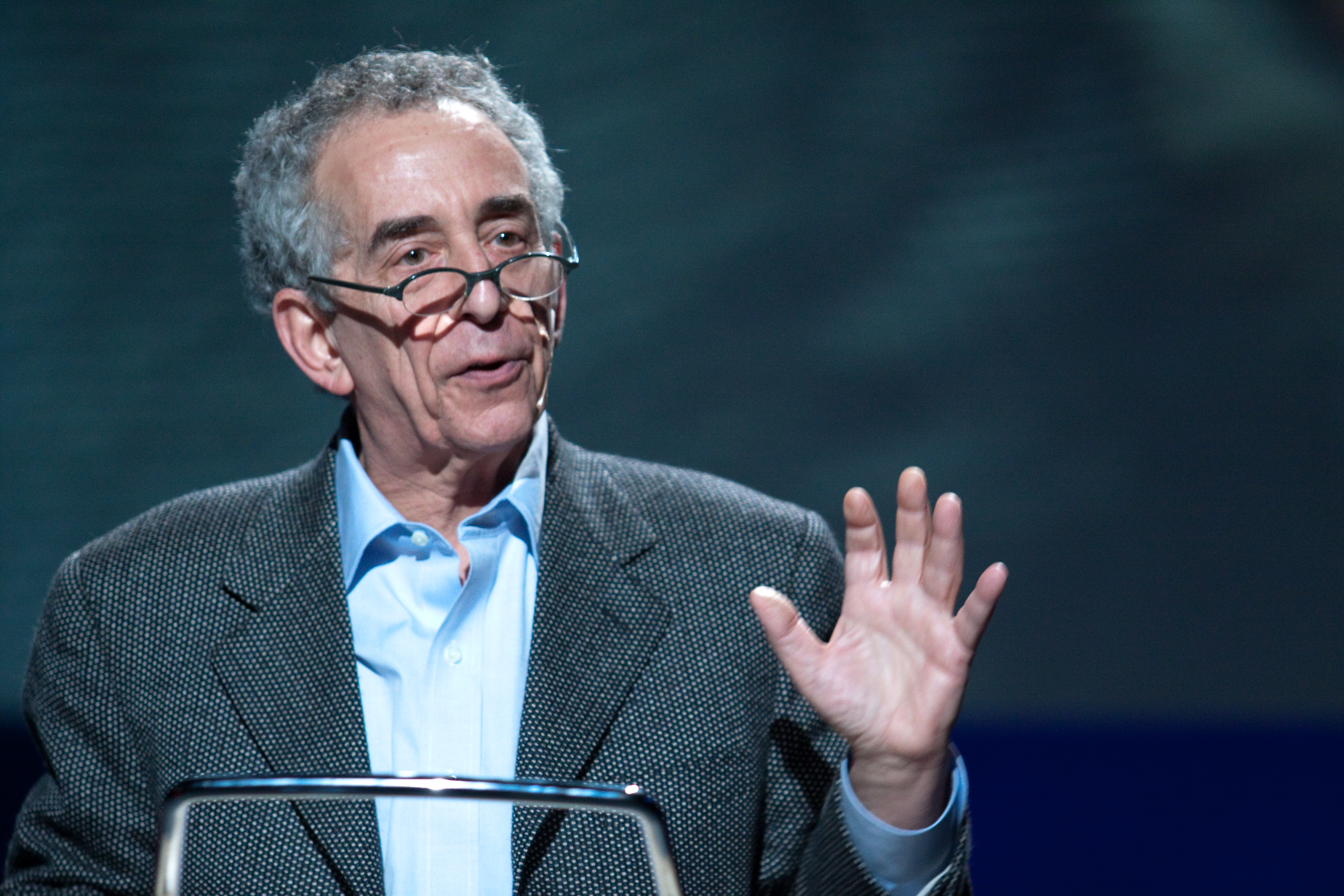
Barry Schwartz

=== Former faculty ===
- Nathalie Anderson, English literature
- Solomon Asch, psychology
- W. H. Auden, poet, literature; professor from 1942 to 1945
- Monroe Beardsley, philosopher of art
- Brand Blanshard, philosophy
- Daniel J. Boorstin, history
- Richard Brandt, philosophy
- Ralph Bunche, political science, diplomat, and Nobel Peace Prize laureate
- Joseph Church, music
- Bruce Cumings, international relations
- James Freeman, music
- Robert Gallucci
- Kenneth Gergen, psychology
- Scott F. Gilbert, biology
- Lila R. Gleitman, linguistics
- Harold Clarke Goddard, English and Shakespeare studies
- Frank Hastings Griffin, chemistry
- Rush D. Holt, Jr., physics
- Raymond F. Hopkins, political science
- Philip Jefferson, economics
- Jennie Keith, anthropology
- Nannerl O. Keohane, political science
- Robert Keohane, political science
- Wolfgang Köhler, psychology
- James Kurth, political science, editor of Orbis
- Andrea Lee, English literature
- Joseph Leidy, natural history
- Gerald Levinson, music
- George W. Lewis, engineering
- Kenneth Lieberthal, political science
- James Magruder, theatre
- Michael Marissen, music
- Louis Massiah, black studies, film, and media studies
- Ann McNamee, music
- Judith Moffett, English
- Jonathan D. Moreno
- Scott Nearing, economics
- Harold E. Pagliaro, English
- Frederic Pryor, economics
- Maria L. Sanford, history
- Barry Schwartz, professor of psychology
- Wolfgang F. Stolper, economics
- Judith G. Voet, chemistry and biochemistry
- Hans Wallach, psychology
- Kenneth Waltz, political science
- Clair Wilcox, economics
