= First Fruits =

Religious offering of the first agricultural produce of the harvest

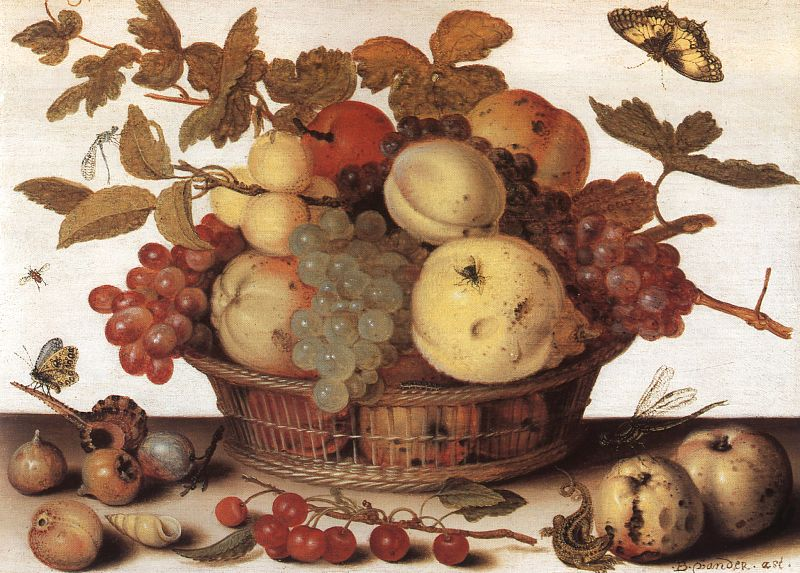
Fruit Basket (painting by Balthasar van der Ast).

First Fruits is a religious offering of the first agricultural produce of the harvest. In classical Greek, Roman, and Hebrew religions, the first fruits were given to priests as an offering to deity.

== Rome ==
The first fruits of the field were offered to Priapus.

== Greece ==
In Classical Athens the First Fruits were called an offering of aparche. Except during times of war, this would be a major source of funds for the temples of the Eleusinian goddesses, Demeter and Kore. Much of the agricultural offering was sold by the temple with the proceeds being used to pay for the daily upkeep of the temple complex. Under Pericles' rule, it became a way of extending Athens' power. The Demos or voting citizens would control the operation of the temple by elected boards. During times of war or for other necessity the Demos would borrow money from the treasury of the temple. Neighboring cities under Athens' control were required to give offerings from their harvests. This served to enrich Athens and extend her power.

Much of this was shown in the temple reports which were carved in stone when the governing body (called the epistatai) of the temple changed hands. In the stone IG I^{3} 386-387 it can be seen how the finances of the Eleusinian temples worked. Doctor Maureen B. Cavanaugh who translated stone IG I^{3} 386–387, argues that there were heavy implications of the funding realized from the First Fruits donations to the temple, in particular that it brought significant impact on Athenian power. This is noted in a loan cited in the stone record, of over 20,000 silver drachmas to the city.

Inscription IG I^{2} 76 shows the provisions made for the offering of first fruits to Demeter and Kore by Athenian demes, Athens' allies and other Greek cities. It sets out that one six-hundredth of the barley crop and one twelve-hundredth of the wheat was to be offered to the goddesses. The proposal for the decree came from a special board of 'draftsmen' (syngrapheis), which suggests that the matter was deemed relatively complicated. Sacrifices were to be paid for out of the proceeds from the barley and wheat, votive offerings were to be made to the two goddesses, and the rest of the grain was to be sold. There were clearly concerns that some allies might avoid offering grain by claiming that they had come to Athens but never been received by officials there. So, the inscription insists that the Hieropoioi accept the grain within five days, or otherwise be subject to a substantial fine of 1000 drachmas. In order to draw in other Greeks, the Hieropoioi were then to record the weight of grain received on a board and distribute it to other cities, encouraging them to contribute. Lampon, a renowned seer in fifth-century Athens, moved a rider in which he proposed several changes to the draft decree: that the decree should be inscribed on stelai both in Eleusis and in Athens, that there should be an intercalary month in the following year, and that the Pelargikon (sacred land around the western end of the Acropolis) should be tidied up and protected. This demonstrates the authority which he gained from his expertise as a seer – notable since the Athenians tended to shy away from the recognition of experts in most fields.

The motivation behind the offering of first fruits is a combination of three religious factors: the need to honour the two goddesses, obedience to Apollo (in the form of the oracle), and 'ancestral custom'. The last two factors suggest that a recent oracle was in line with an older practice which had either fallen into disuse, or was being transformed into a much larger affair. In return for the offering, 'there will be many benefits in abundance of good harvests if they are men who do not injure the Athenians'. The reward, therefore, although it could only be guaranteed by the gods, was conditional on not injuring Athens. The decree cannot be dated precisely, however the combination of specific religious policy and Athenian political dominance evident here is relevant throughout Athens' imperial period. It is an example of Athens striving to advertise her claims to leadership in Greece, whilst simultaneously binding herself more closely with her allies. Similar to this is the expectation that allies would bring annual tribute to the City Dionysia, and sacrificial contributions to the Panathenaea.

== In Judaism ==
In ancient Judaism, bikkurim were a type of sacrificial offering. In each agricultural season, the first-grown fruits were brought to the Temple and laid by the altar, and a special declaration recited.

The command to bring first-fruits to the Temple appears in the Torah, in Exodus 23:19 and Deuteronomy 26:1–11. The latter passage records the declaration (also known as the Avowal) which was recited upon presenting the first-fruits to the priest (Deuteronomy 26:3–10). The detailed laws of this offering were recorded by the rabbis in the Bikkurim tractate of the Talmud.

== In Christianity ==
In Christianity, the Old Testament, "when the harvest ripened the priest went into the field and gathered a sheaf of first-ripened grain. Then he took that sheaf into the temple and waved it before the Lord." The Didache of the early Church enjoined firstfruits be given of "money, clothes, and all of your possessions" (13:7). The practice of having the First Fruits blessed at the church has been celebrated through the feast of Lammas (Loaf Mass Day) in Western Christianity. In Eastern Orthodox Christianity, the 'first fruits' tradition is kept during the Feast of the Transfiguration, held on August 6.

In Christian denominations, the tithe is given as a donation or offering serving as a primary source of income to maintain the religious leaders and facilities; offerings are funds or resources given beyond the amount of the tithe.

First Corinthians, in the New Testament, referred to Jesus' resurrection as a type of First Fruit, "But now Christ has been raised from the dead, the first fruits of those who are asleep."

=== In Eastern Christianity ===
In the Eastern Orthodox Church the offering of first fruits takes the form of a thanksgiving and blessing. The produce is then consumed by the faithful rather than being given to the Church (though it may be donated as a free-will offering). The liturgical concept behind the blessing is the faithful offering back to God a token of that which he in his lovingkindness has provided, God blessing these first fruits and returning them to the faithful for their benefit and blessing.

The blessing of first fruits traditionally begins on the Great Feast of the Transfiguration (August 6), with the blessing of grapes. In localities where grapes are not grown, other early-ripening fruits such as apples may be offered. There is a special ceremony at the end of the Divine Liturgy at which the priest blesses the first fruits, asking "that the Lord may bless them, that they may be to us unto rejoicing, and that He may accept a gift of these fruits unto the cleansing of our sins".

As the harvest season progresses, the first fruits of each species can be brought to the church to be blessed, using a similar format, but a different prayer: "that the Lord may receive our gift unto His eternal treasury and grant us an abundance of earthly goods".

=== In Western Christianity ===
In the Middle Ages the concept of offering the first fruits was adapted by the Christian church. This was called a tithe and was basically a tax to support the local clergy and the facility. In England, every tenth egg, sheaf of wheat, lamb, chicken, and all other animals were given to the church as a tithe, so farm products were expected to be donated throughout the year.

In France, the tithes—called la dîme—were a land and agricultural tax. The offering of first fruits was also referred to as new fruits. In French churches in the Middle Ages, new fruits were at given seasons presented at Mass for blessing. The blessed fruits were kept by the church and divided between the clergy and the poor. Similar customs during the Middle Ages could be found in all European countries.

First Fruits also refers to the payment new clerics made to the bishop or the Pope of all profits from the territory the new cleric controlled. This payment was called both Annates and First Fruits.

A less agricultural sort of First Fruits (primitiae in Latin) is the "Primice" as it is called in some languages, that is, the First Mass said by a newly ordained priest; it is customarily celebrated with special magnificence, and even, despite the literal meaning of "First Mass", repeated a limited amount of times. The first-fruits of such a priest's power-to-bless are held in alike esteem.

=== In the Latter Day Saint movement ===
In the Book of Mormon, a canon of scripture used by the Latter Day Saint movement, a similar passage is found stating "the Holy Messiah, who layeth down his life according to the flesh, and taketh it again by the power of the Spirit, that he may bring to pass the resurrection of the dead, being the first that should rise. Wherefore, he is the firstfruits unto God".

== See also ==
Lughnasadh
