= Swarthmore =

Swarthmore may refer to:

- Swarthmore Lecture, an annual lecture given during the Britain Yearly Meeting
- Swarthmore, Pennsylvania, a borough in Pennsylvania
- Swarthmore College, a liberal arts college in Pennsylvania
  - List of Swarthmore College people, individuals associated with the above college
- Swarthmore station, a railroad station in Swarthmore, Pennsylvania
- Swarthmore High School, a secondary school (now closed) in Swarthmore, Pennsylvania

== See also ==
- Swarthmoor Hall, historic Quaker site in Cumbria, England
- Swarthmoor, a village from which the above gets its name
