= Duke-UNC China Leadership Summit =

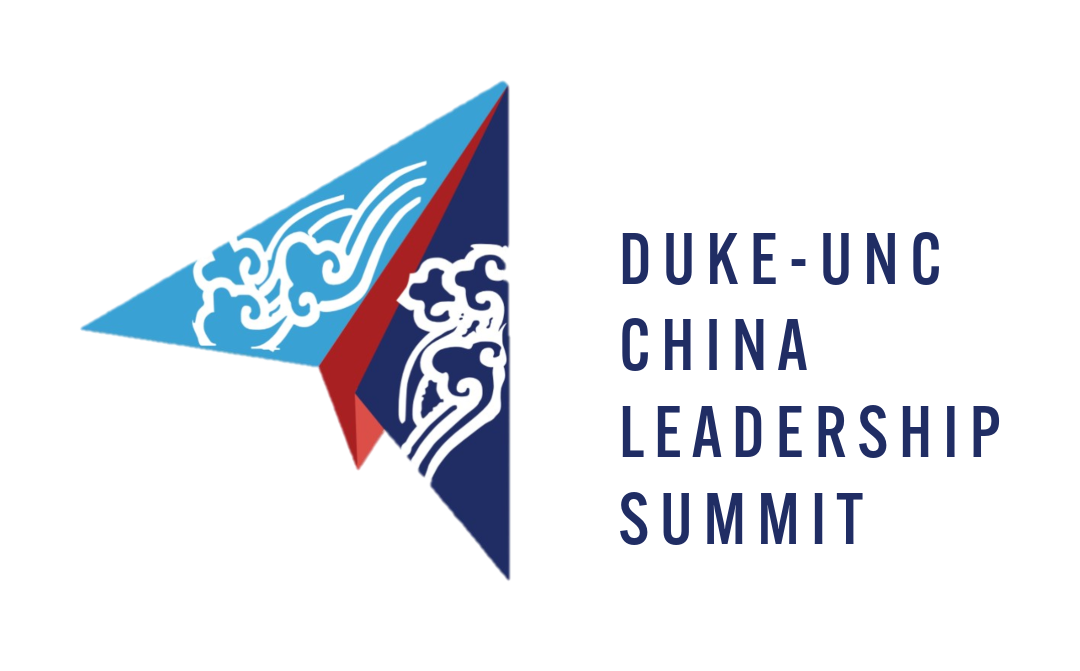
- Abbreviation: CLS
- Formation: 2010
- Type: Non-Profit
- Purpose: International Relations
- Headquarters: Durham, North Carolina
- Official language: English
- Website: http://www.dukeunccls.com/

The Duke-UNC China Leadership Summit (CLS) is an annual student conference that brings together distinguished student leaders and eminent individuals in the fields of academia, politics and business to examine the rise of China.

Inspired by student conferences like The Harvard Project for Asian and International Relations and the Forum for American/Chinese Exchange at Stanford, CLS is the first conference of its kind in the southern United States. Established in 2010 with the goal of providing sustained collaboration between students and faculty at Duke University and the University of North Carolina at Chapel Hill and to connect students in the Research Triangle to innovative research and professional development opportunities in field of US-China relations, it has grown to host over 150 delegates from across the US and China.

In 2012, the Duke-UNC China Leadership Summit received sponsorship from the prestigious Kenan-Biddle Grant and was able to offer admission to non Duke and UNC Students.

== Former Speakers ==
- Dennis C. Blair, former U.S. Director of National Intelligence, former Commander in Chief of the U.S. Pacific Command, retired U.S. Navy admiral.
- Quan Jing, Minister of the Chinese Embassy in Washington, D.C., former Deputy Director-General of the Department of North American and Oceanian Affairs of the Chinese Ministry of Foreign Affairs.
- James Heller, Consul General of the Consulate General of the United States of America in Shanghai, China.
- Melissa J. Lan, Consul General of the Consulate General of the United States of America in Wuhan, China.
- Yanzhong Huang, Senior Fellow for Global Health at the Council on Foreign Relations.
- David Shambaugh, Professor of Political Science and International Affairs and the Director of the China Policy Program at George Washington University.
- Jenny Chan, Departmental Lecturer in the Sociology of China at Oxford University and Advisor to Students and Scholars Against Corporate Misbehavior (SACOM).
- Bonnie Glaser, Senior Adviser for Asia, Freeman Chair in China Studies and Senior Associate, Pacific Forum at CSIS.
- Denis Simon, former Executive Vice Chancellor at Duke Kunshan University.
- Taisu Zhang, Professor of Law at Yale Law School.
- Jonathan Woetzel, Director of the McKinsey Global Institute.
- Rachel Wasser, Cofounder of Teach for China.
- David Wertime, Cofounder of Tea Leaf Nation.
- Louisa Greve, Director of Global Advocacy for the Uyghur Human Rights Project.
- Aaron Friedberg, Professor of Politics and International Affairs at Princeton University.
- Dan Blumenthal, Director of Asian Studies at the American Enterprise Institute.
- Deborah Bräutigam, Professor of Comparative Politics and Director of the International Development Program (IDEV), and the China Africa Research Initiative (CARI) at Johns Hopkins University's School of Advanced International Studies (SAIS).
- David H. Shinn, Adjunct Professor of International Affairs at The George Washington University's Elliott School of International Affairs.
- Paul Haagen, Senior Associate Dean at the Duke Law School and former chair of Duke's China Faculty Council.
- Kaiser Kuo, Chinese American journalist and musician, Founder and Co-Host of Sinica Podcast.
- Emily Feng, NPR's Beijing correspondent.

== Former Participating Institutions ==
- Harvard University
- Princeton University
- Yale University
- Columbia University in the City of New York
- University of Pennsylvania
- Duke Kunshan University
- Washington University in St. Louis
- Johns Hopkins University
- University of Southern California
- University of Virginia
- Wake Forest University
- North Carolina State University
- Fordham University
- University of North Carolina Greensboro
- New York University Shanghai
- Wellesley College
- Pomona College
- Bowdoin College
- Williams College
- Middlebury College
- Morehouse College
- Liberty University
- Grinnell College
- University of Alabama
- University of Nebraska at Kearney
- Appalachian State University
- Davidson College
- Wright State University
- Guilford College
- University of Mississippi
- The George Washington University
- Winston-Salem State University
