= Hephaesteia (festival) =

Ancient Greek festival

The Hephaesteia (Ancient Greek: Ἡφαίστεια), or Hephaestia, was an ancient Greek festival primarily celebrated in Athens and Lemnos in honor of the god Hephaestus. Initially, the Hephaesteia was an annual festival, but according to Aristotle, by the time of the archonship of Ktesiphon (329 BC - 328 BC), it was held every five years.

A grand sacrifice was made during the Hephaesteia, followed by musical competitions for boys and men, as well as a torch race (Lampadephoria), which was the most spectacular part of the festival and one of its main events due to Hephaestus' connection to fire. The organization of the festival was overseen by 20 men, specially elected for the event, who were called "hieropoioi" (sacred officials). Additionally, 200 citizens of Athens were responsible for managing the sacrifice, procession, and competitions. Festivals were also held in other cities of the ancient Greek world where there were sanctuaries of the fire god Hephaestus. On Lemnos, where, according to Ancient Greek religion, Hephaestus was thrown after a quarrel with Zeus, the Hephaesteia was the island's most important festival. During that time, all fires were extinguished for nine days until a new flame arrived from the sacred island of Delos.

The exact month in which this festival took place has not been definitively determined, though various theories have been proposed. E. Simon, for example, suggests that the festival occurred during the last month of spring, known as Mounychion. The most significant source of knowledge about the Hephaesteia is the discovery of a fragmentary inscription from 422 BC, which refers to its reorganization.

== Bibliography ==
- "Helios New Encyclopedic Dictionary" (Νεώτερον Εγκυκλοπαιδικόν Λεξικόν Ηλίου) vol. 9, p. 402
- Aristotle. "54". In H. Rackham (ed.). Athenian Constitution. Perseus Digital Library.
- Smith, William (1890). "HEPHAESTEIA". In Wayte, William; Marindin, G. E. (eds.). A Dictionary of Greek and Roman Antiquities. Perseus Digital Library.
- Sikes, E. E. (1911). "Hephaestus" . In Chisholm, Hugh (ed.). Encyclopædia Britannica. Vol. 13 (11th ed.). Cambridge University Press. pp. 304–305.
