= WSRN-FM =

Radio station at Swarthmore College in Swarthmore, Pennsylvania

Coordinates: 39.9051°N 75.3541°W

Swarthmore, Pennsylvania; United States
- Broadcast area: Swarthmore and Philadelphia
- Frequency: 91.5 MHz
- Branding: FM Swarthmore

Programming
- Format: College radio

Ownership
- Owner: Swarthmore College

History
- First air date: October 15, 1972 (on FM)
- Call sign meaning: Worldwide Swarthmore Radio Network

Technical information
- Facility ID: 64289
- Class: A
- ERP: 110 watts
- HAAT: 43 meters

Links
- Website: https://www.wsrnfm.com

WSRN-FM (91.5 FM, The "Worldwide Swarthmore Radio Network") is Swarthmore College's official radio station. It broadcasts out of the suburban Philadelphia borough of Swarthmore, Pennsylvania.

Prior to the 1970s, WSRN operated as a carrier signal broadcast to the campus of Swarthmore College only. The station went on the air with 10 watts on October 15, 1972. Following efforts by the Federal Communications Commission (FCC) to encourage as many Class D stations as possible to increase power, a campaign was raised by the students of the college, and in the late 1970s, the FCC granted a license for a 110-watt, directional, transmission. Additional information about the history of radio at Swarthmore College can be found in and.

Following the COVID-19 pandemic, the radio station had periods of limited broadcasting. During the 2021–2022 academic year, a significant effort by students, faculty, staff, and community members was successfully carried out to get the station back up to an operational state. As of April 1, 2022, the station had resumed broadcasting.
