= Alfred Bloom =

American psychologist and linguist

1st Vice Chancellor of New York University Abu Dhabi
- In office 2008–2019
- Preceded by: Office established
- Succeeded by: Mariët Westermann

13th President of Swarthmore College
- In office 1991–2009
- Preceded by: David W. Fraser
- Succeeded by: Rebecca Chopp

3rd Executive Vice Chancellor of Duke Kunshan University
- In office July 1, 2020 – 2021
- Preceded by: Denis Simon
- Succeeded by: Jennifer Francis (interim); Mary Frances Luce (interim); John Quelch

Personal details
- Education: Princeton University (BA); Harvard University (PhD)

Alfred H. Bloom is an American psychologist and linguist. He was the executive vice chancellor of Duke Kunshan University from 2020 to 2021. Before that, he was the vice chancellor of New York University Abu Dhabi from 2008 to 2019 and the president of Swarthmore College from 1991 to 2009.

== Life ==
Bloom joined NYU Abu Dhabi from Swarthmore College, where he completed an 18-year tenure as president in 2009. Under Bloom, Swarthmore assumed a position of broadly recognized leadership in American liberal arts education. During Bloom's tenure, the college revitalized its academically rigorous Honors Program, undertook extensive renovation and creation of academic buildings, broadened its multicultural curriculum, expanded foreign study, and established the Eugene M. Lang Center for Civic and Social Responsibility.

During the Bloom presidency, the college dramatically increased its diversity, with the proportion of students of color in the entering class rising from 16 percent to 39 percent. The college also achieved a significant increase in admissions applications and selectivity, most recently with more than 6,200 applications of extraordinary quality for approximately 375 places in the Class of 2012. Swarthmore's endowment grew from $400 million in 1991 to $1.4 billion in 2009. In addition, the college raised more than $362 million in gifts during that period. The college also expanded its commitment to financial aid, eliminating loans from students' financial aid packages, and ensuring that aid covered all foreign study. In 2000, Bloom and Swarthmore's Board of Managers, in a controversial decision, eliminated the college's football program.

Prior to assuming the presidency at Swarthmore, Bloom served as executive vice president of Pitzer College in Claremont, California. Previously, he was vice president of academic affairs and dean of faculty at Pitzer. He was appointed as an assistant professor of psychology and linguistics at Swarthmore in 1974, and named associate provost in 1985.

In 1967, Bloom received his B.A., summa cum laude in Romance languages and European civilization from Princeton University. That year, he studied in France as a Fulbright-Hays fellow. In 1974, he received his Ph.D. in psychology and social relations from Harvard University. The concept of "ethical intelligence,” which has gained currency within and outside of higher education, was introduced by Bloom who first expressed it in his inaugural address as president of Swarthmore in 1991 and has since amplified its meaning in numerous writings and speeches.

Bloom's research brings together psychology and linguistics, particularly with respect to how they help us to understand cross-cultural continuities and differences in thought and moral understanding and the reciprocal impact of language on thought and thought on language. He is the author of "The Linguistic Shaping of Thought: A Study of the Impact of Language on Thinking in China and the West" (Lawrence Erlbaum Associates, 1981) and Moral Behavior in Chinese Society (Praeger Publishers, 1981) as well as numerous articles including "The Privileging of Experience in Chinese Practical Reasoning," Journal of Chinese Philosophy; "Psychological Ingredients of High-Level Moral Thinking: A Critique of the Kohlberg-Gilligan Paradigm," Journal for the Theory of Social Behaviour; and "Caution - The words you use may affect what you say," Cognition.

Bloom is the recipient of honorary doctorates from the University of Richmond and Swarthmore College.

Bloom served as the vice chancellor of New York University Abu Dhabi from 2008 to 2019.

Bloom was named executive vice chancellor of Duke Kunshan University (DKU) in China in May 2020, and served until 2021.

== Research ==
Bloom's research has focused on the comparative study of languages, especially between Mandarin and English. Bloom has argued for a weak version of the so-called linguistic relativity hypothesis, which postulates an influence of language on the way speakers conceptualize and arrange the reality; he has tried to show this through his most widely known experiment. He selected two different groups of subjects, one composed of native English speakers and the other composed of Chinese speakers; the subjects were shown a text written in their own respective languages, and their task was to read that text and, afterwards, give an answer to the question whether or not what it told had actually happened. The text, which had been initially written in English and later on translated into Chinese in a literal way, reported a set of counterfactual events that were told by using the subjunctive, a verb mood that is nowhere found in the Sinitic languages. In the end, Chinese speakers gave a much higher percentage of wrong answers than the English group. Therefore, Bloom's conclusion was the impossibility to translate literally between languages: Chinese and English express different thoughts, even when they are telling the same story.

== Sources ==
- Au, T. K. F. (1983), “Chinese and English counterfactuals: the Sapir-Whorf hypothesis revisited”. Cognition, 15(1), 155–187.
- Bloom, A. H. (1984), “Caution – the Words You Use May Affect what You Say: a Response to Au”. Cognition, 17, 275–287.
- Bloom, A. H. (1981), The Linguistic Shaping of Thought: A Study on the Impact of Language on Thinking in China and the West, New York, Psychology Press.
- Bloom, A. H. (1979). "The Impact of Chinese Linguistic Structure on Cognitive Style." Current Anthropology 20(3).
- Swarthmore College Bulletin http://media.swarthmore.edu/bulletin/?p=210
- NYU Abu Dhabi Vice Chancellor's Welcome https://web.archive.org/web/20120701183144/http://nyuad.nyu.edu/about/message.html
