= Rebecca Chopp =

American academic administrator

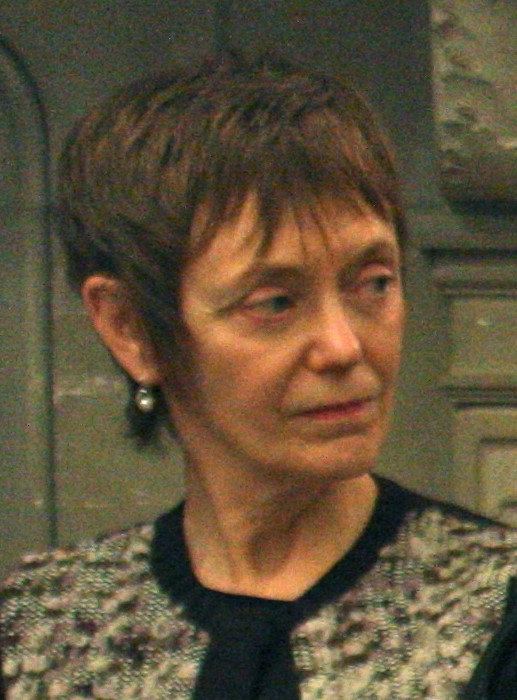
- Chopp in 2013

18th Chancellor of University of Denver
- In office 2014–2019
- Preceded by: Robert Coombe
- Succeeded by: Jeremy Haefner

14th President of Swarthmore College
- In office 2009–2014
- Preceded by: Alfred Bloom
- Succeeded by: Valerie Smith

15th President of Colgate University
- In office 2002–2009
- Preceded by: Charles Karelis
- Succeeded by: Jeffrey Herbst

Personal details
- Born: 1952 (age 73–74) Kansas, United States
- Spouse: Frederick Thibodeau
- Children: 3 sons
- Education: Kansas Wesleyan University (BA); St. Paul School of Theology (MDiv); University of Chicago (PhD)

Rebecca S. Chopp (born 1952) is an American academic administrator and professor. She was the chancellor of the University of Denver, the first female chancellor in the institution's history. Prior to that, Chopp was a president of Swarthmore College and Colgate University.

== Biography ==
Chopp received her B.A. from Kansas Wesleyan University, a Master of Divinity (M.Div.) from Saint Paul School of Theology and a Ph.D. from the University of Chicago. Before Swarthmore, Chopp was the president of Colgate University. Before arriving at Colgate in 2002, Chopp was Dean and Titus Street Professor of Theology at Yale Divinity School. She spent fifteen years at Emory University before her tenure at Yale.

Chopp's research focuses on religion and American culture, but she has also written about the culture of higher education and the liberal arts in a democratic society.

Chopp was one of more than 100 college presidents in the United States to call for the drinking age to be lowered.

In June 2014, she announced her decision to accept the position of chancellor of the University of Denver, citing her desire to live in Denver as one of the reasons for leaving Swarthmore. In the summer of 2019, Chancellor Chopp resigned because of health problems.

== Advocacy for Alzheimer's ==
Chopp was diagnosed with early stage Alzheimer's disease in 2019. This led to her resignation from her position as chancellor of Denver University, citing a "complex neurological disorder."

Chopp has been actively involved in Alzheimer's advocacy since then, helping launch Voices for Alzheimer's, an advocacy group, with Phil Gutis. She holds a position on the Board of the Colorado Alzheimer's Association and contributes to the Early Stage Advisory Board at the National Alzheimer's Organization In her free time, Chopp engages in painting and writes about Alzheimer's advocacy in a guest opinion column for The Denver Post.
