= Karen Pence (economist) =

American economist

- Education: Swarthmore College (BA); University of Wisconsin–Madison (MS), (PhD)
- Scientific career
- Fields: Real estate economics, financial economics
- Workplaces: Federal Reserve Board of Governors
- Website: https://works.bepress.com/karen_pence/

Karen M. Pence is an American economist who is Deputy Associate Director of the Research and Statistics Division of the Federal Reserve Board of Governors, responsible for the Survey of Consumer Finances, and former chair of the Board of the Panel Study of Income Dynamics. She is a past president of the American Real Estate and Urban Economics Association.

Her research focuses on household housing finance, particularly mortgage lending and mortgage default.

== Selected works ==
- Mayer, Christopher, Karen Pence, and Shane M. Sherlund. "The rise in mortgage defaults." Journal of Economic perspectives 23, no. 1 (2009): 27–50.
- Dynan, Karen, Atif Mian, and Karen M. Pence. "Is a household debt overhang holding back consumption?[with comments and discussion]." Brookings Papers on Economic Activity (2012): 299–362.
- Pence, Karen M. "Foreclosing on opportunity: State laws and mortgage credit." Review of Economics and Statistics 88, no. 1 (2006): 177–182.
- Campbell, Sean, Daniel Covitz, William Nelson, and Karen Pence. "Securitization markets and central banking: An evaluation of the term asset-backed securities loan facility." Journal of Monetary Economics 58, no. 5 (2011): 518–531.
- Pence, Karen M. "The role of wealth transformations: An application to estimating the effect of tax incentives on saving." The BE Journal of Economic Analysis & Policy 5, no. 1 (2006).
