= Paul Crowell =

American physicist

Paul A. Crowell is a professor of physics at the University of Minnesota, United States. His research specialties include spin dynamics and transport in ferromagnets and ferromagnet-semiconductor heterostructures. Crowell received his BA in physics and mathematics from Swarthmore College in 1986, later earning his PhD in physics from Cornell University in 1994. He is an honors undergraduate physics instructor and is the leader of a research group exploring "Spin Dynamics, Transport and Magneto-optics."

He was elected in 2008 a Fellow of the American Physical Society for "application of elegant optical and transport techniques to the study of spin dynamics and transport in metals and semiconductors and experiments probing the excitation spectra of inhomogeneously magnetized systems, particularly magnetic vortices."
