= Mary Brown Bullock =

American academic

1st Executive Vice Chancellor of Duke Kunshan University
- In office September 20, 2012 – August 1, 2015
- Preceded by: Office established
- Succeeded by: Denis Simon

7th President of Agnes Scott College
- In office 1995 – August 1, 2006
- Preceded by: Sally Mahoney (interim)
- Succeeded by: Elizabeth Kiss

Personal details
- Education: Agnes Scott College (BA); Stanford University (MA, PhD)

Mary Brown Bullock (born 1944) is an American academic who served as the seventh president of Agnes Scott College in Decatur, GA from 1995 to August 1, 2006. She was the inaugural executive vice chancellor of Duke Kunshan University.

== Early life ==
Bullock was born in 1944. When she was 8 years old, Bullock lived in Korea with her parents. Her father was G. Thompson Brown, a Presbyterian missionary. Her mother, Mardia Hopper Brown, was born in Korea. Mary Brown Bullock graduated Phi Beta Kappa from Agnes Scott College in 1966, and continued her education at Stanford University, where she earned her master's degree in 1968 and her doctorate degree in Chinese history in 1973.

== Career ==
Bullock is specialist on Chinese history, a member of the board of trustees for the Asia Foundation and the Council on Foreign Relations, chair of the China Medical Board of New York and a director of the National Committee on U.S.-China Relations. She serves on the boards of directors for SunTrust Bank and Atlanta and Genuine Parts Company. Bullock completed terms as chair of the Women's College Coalition and the National Association of Independent Colleges, and as a director of the American Council of Education. As of fall 2006, Bullock became a policy fellow at the Woodrow Wilson International Center for Scholars and joined the faculty of Emory University as Visiting Distinguished Professor of China Studies in the fall of 2007. From 1988 to 1995, Bullock presided as director of the Asia Program at The Woodrow Wilson International Center for Scholars in Washington, D.C., and, for part of that period, was a professorial lecturer at Johns Hopkins University's Paul H. Nitze School of Advanced International Studies School for Advanced International Studies (SAIS).

From 1977 to 1988, she was director, and from 1973 to 1977, professional associate of the Committee on Scholarly Communication with the People's Republic of China. She is the author of An American Transplant: The Rockefeller Foundation and Peking Union Medical College and numerous journal articles.

== Agnes Scott Presidency ==
Mary Brown Bullock was appointed as the seventh president of the Agnes Scott College on 25 January 1995 and began her duties on 1 July 1995. At the beginning of her presidency, Bullock initiated a campaign to increase the student population of Agnes Scott College to over 1,000 students. In Bullock's final year of presidency, the college reached her goal: the student population was at 1,032, up from 608 students in 1995.

As President of Agnes Scott College, Bullock created a true legacy and initiated the largest campaign in the college's history: a building program which renovated many of the historic buildings at Agnes Scott and built several new structures. The McCain Library was enlarged and new technology was introduced; the Letitia Pate Evans Dining Hall was dramatically redesigned and renovated; and a new parking deck with an adjacent Public Safety Office were added as well. Additionally, Bullock oversaw a large addition to the Bradley Observatory, including a 75-seat planetarium with a Zeiss projector system, and a LIDAR laboratory. The biggest structural achievement during Bullock's reign was the $36.5 million Science Center that includes a three-story length painting of Agnes Scott's actual DNA, along with state-of-the-art equipment in all the labs. In a naming ceremony in January 2006, the Science Center became Mary Brown Bullock Science Center. She also succeeded in creating a strong endowment plan and increased funds for aesthetic and technological improvements designed to boost its national reputation.

Bullock currently lives with her husband, George, an energy consultant, in Decatur, GA, near Atlanta.

== Duke Kunshan University ==
In September 2012, Bullock was named executive vice chancellor of Duke Kunshan University, a collaboration between Duke University and Wuhan University. Bullock served until 2015.

== Selected publications ==
- ———— (1980). An American Transplant: The Rockefeller Foundation and the Peking Union Medical College. Berkeley: University of California Press.
- ———— (2011). The Oil Prince's Legacy: Rockefeller Philanthropy in China. Washington, D.C. Stanford, CA: Woodrow Wilson Center Press; Stanford University Press. ISBN 9780804776882.
- ———— (2023). China on My Mind. Xlibris. ISBN 9798369401156.
