= Robert L. Patten (writer) =

American writer

- Born: April 26, 1939 (age 87)
- Education: Swarthmore College; Princeton University
- Occupation: Writer

Robert L. Patten (born April 26, 1939) is an American writer. He is the Lynette S. Autrey Professor in the department of English at Rice University.

== Books ==
- George Cruikshank: A Revaluation
- George Cruikshank's Life, Times, and Art, Volume 1: 1792-1835
- Behind the Scenes: Publishing about Dickens in Hard Times: The Culture and Politics of Academic Publishing
- Charles Dickens and ‘Boz’: The Birth of the Industrial-Age Author
- Charles Dickens and His Publishers
- Charles Dickens and His Publishers. 2nd ed.
