= Valerie Smith (academic) =

Swarthmore College president (born 1956)

15th President of Swarthmore College
- Incumbent
- Assumed office July 1, 2015
- Preceded by: Rebecca Chopp

Dean of the College of Princeton University
- In office July 1, 2011 – June 1, 2015
- Preceded by: Nancy Weiss Malkiel
- Succeeded by: Jill Dolan

Personal details
- Born: February 19, 1956 (age 70) New York City, New York, U.S.
- Education: Bates College (BA); University of Virginia (MA, PhD)

Valerie Smith (born February 19, 1956) is an American academic administrator and scholar of African-American literature and culture. She is the 15th and current president of Swarthmore College.

She taught at Princeton University from 1980 to 1989 and at the University of California, Los Angeles, from 1989 to 2000. In 2000, Smith returned to Princeton as the Woodrow Wilson Professor of Literature and director of the program in African American Studies. From 2006 to 2009, Smith served as the founding director of Princeton's interdisciplinary Center for African American Studies. After being the dean of the university's college, Smith became the president of Swarthmore College in July 2015.

== Early life and education ==
Smith was born in Manhattan, New York and grew up in Brooklyn with her parents and two younger siblings. Her father, W. Reeves Smith, was a biology professor at Long Island University, and her mother, Josephine Smith, was a public school teacher. Both parents were from Charleston, South Carolina, and moved to New York.

Smith attended Midwood High School in Brooklyn. At age 15, she enrolled at Bates College, where she majored in English literature and graduated Phi Beta Kappa and cum laude in 1975. Smith completed her graduate work at the University of Virginia, where she earned her M.A. and Ph.D. degrees.

== Academic career ==
Smith began her teaching career at Princeton University in 1980, holding appointments in English and African-American Studies. In 1989, Smith joined the faculty at the University of California, Los Angeles, as a tenured associate professor of English; she was promoted to full professor in 1994. During her time at UCLA, she served as vice chair for Graduate Studies in the English department, chair of the Interdepartmental Program in African American Studies and co-director of the Cultural Studies in the African Diaspora Project.

=== Princeton ===
Smith returned to Princeton in 2001 as the Woodrow Wilson Professor of Literature and Professor of English and African American Studies. She was subsequently asked to serve as the director of the university’s Program in African American Studies, which, in 2006, became the Center for African American Studies (CAAS). During her tenure as CAAS director, Smith created a distinguished lecture series, a postdoctoral fellows program, and a distinguished visiting scholars program. She is credited with helping evolve the CAAS from an interdisciplinary program into a dynamic and top ranked center for teaching and research about race. In 2004, Smith delivered the keynote address for Princeton’s observance of Martin Luther King Jr. Day.

In 2010, Smith was named Princeton's dean of the college, the University's undergraduate program. She assumed the position in July 2011. As dean, Smith oversaw all aspects of Princeton's undergraduate program, including the curriculum, academic advising, academic regulations, the offices of Admission and Undergraduate Financial Aid, the Residential Colleges, and more. Smith removed numerical targets for the university's grading policy, expanded socioeconomic diversity, created an international residential college exchange program, and created the Office of Undergraduate Research of Princeton University.

On February 21, 2015, Swarthmore College announced that Smith was selected as the college's 15th president, effective July 1, 2015. She remained at Princeton until June of that year.

=== Swarthmore College ===
In February 2015, the Board of Managers of Swarthmore College unanimously approved Smith as the next president of the college and announced that she would begin her tenure on July 1, 2015. She would also hold appointments in English Literature and Black Studies.

She has announced her intent to retire at the conclusion of the 2026-2027 academic year.

== Personal life ==
Smith lives in Swarthmore, Pennsylvania. She is an emeritus member of the Bates College Board of Trustees, having served from 2004-15. Her current board service includes the American Council on Education, the National Museum of the American Indian, PSEG, the Alfred P. Sloan Foundation, and the Bogliasco Foundation.

== Awards and honors ==
Smith has received fellowships from the Alphonse G. Fletcher Foundation, the Guggenheim Foundation, and the National Endowment for the Humanities. In 2009, Smith won Princeton's President's Award for Distinguished Teaching. In 2016, she received an honorary Doctor of Letters degree from Hong Kong Baptist University and delivered a distinguished lecture on "Liberal Arts Education: Challenges and Prospects." She is a member of the Council on Foreign Relations and the American Academy of Arts and Sciences. In 2025, she was elected to the American Philosophical Society.

She has served on the editorial boards of Women's Studies Quarterly, Criticism, and African American Review.

== Selected works ==
Smith is the author of three monographs: Self-Discovery and Authority in Afro-American Narrative (1987), Not Just Race, Not Just Gender: Black Feminist Readings (1998), and Toni Morrison: Writing the Moral Imagination (2012). She is the editor or co-editor of seven books, and the author of over forty articles.

== See also ==
- List of Bates College people
- List of University of Virginia people
- List of Swarthmore College people
- History of Princeton University
