= The Swarthmore Phoenix =

Campus newspaper at Swarthmore College

- Type: Weekly student newspaper
- Format: Broadsheet
- School: Swarthmore College
- Founded: 1881
- Language: English
- Headquarters: 500 College Ave, Swarthmore, Pennsylvania, U.S.
- Country: United States
- Circulation: 1,500
- Website: swarthmorephoenix.com

The Swarthmore Phoenix is an independent campus newspaper at Swarthmore College. It was founded in 1881 or 1882. Since August 2026, the editor-in-chief has been Ella Walker.

== History ==
The Phoenix as a symbol has deep roots in Swarthmore lore. When the College's iconic Parrish Hall was gutted by fire in 1881, it was immediately rebuilt, symbolically rising from the ashes like the bird found in Egyptian and Greek mythology. Soon after, The Phoenix was established as the campus newspaper of Swarthmore College, publishing its first issue on December 1, 1881.

With an early staff that often numbered fewer than 10, The Phoenix was first published monthly, then moved to a bi-weekly schedule in 1894; it is now published weekly with a staff of more than 40 editors, reporters, and columnists. The Phoenix first appeared online in September 1995.

In the Fall of 2018 the Phoenix merged with The Daily Gazette, a daily email-based publication at Swarthmore, consolidating both newspapers into one website.

== Notable coverage ==
In 2019, documents leaked by The Phoenix helped lead to the disbanding of Greek life at Swarthmore.

== Awards and Commendations ==
Online Pacemaker Winner 2010, 2011.

Ranked fifth in disability coverage among liberal arts college newspapers in 2023.

== Alumni ==
- William C. Sproul, governor of Pennsylvania
- Drew Pearson, journalist
- Heywood Hale Broun, actor and broadcaster
- Michael Dukakis, governor of Massachusetts
- Victor Navansky, journalist
- Jed S. Rakoff, federal judge.
- John Freeman, author and literary critic

== Bibliography ==
- Walton, Richard J. (1986). Swarthmore College: An Informal History. The Swarthmore. OCLC 988369430.
