= Lara Estroff =

American materials scientist and academic

Lara Ann Estroff
- Education: Swarthmore College; Yale University
- Awards: 2026 MRS fellow 2025 AAAS fellow
- Scientific career
- Workplaces: Cornell University; Harvard University; Weizmann Institute of Science
- Thesis: Bio-inspired supramolecular control of inorganic crystal growth (2003)
- Doctoral advisor: Andrew D. Hamilton

Lara Ann Estroff is an American materials scientist who is a professor at Cornell University. Her research considers the study and design of biomaterials. She is an elected fellow of the American Association for the Advancement of Science and of the Materials Research Society.

== Early life and education ==
Estroff was an undergraduate student at Swarthmore College, where she majored in chemistry and anthropology. As a college student, she played soccer. Estroff then worked at the Weizmann Institute of Science, alongside Lia Addadi, where she started investigating biomineralization and how chemical approaches could be used to solve challenges in archaeology. Estroff returned to the United States for doctoral research, joining the laboratory of Andrew D. Hamilton where she worked on the synthesis of organic superstructures that were inspired by biology. These molecules can be used to control the growth of inorganic crystals. Estroff moved to Harvard University as an National Institutes of Health postdoctoral fellow with George M. Whitesides.

== Research and career ==
In 2005, Estroff joined Cornell University, where she was made professor in 2019. Estroff studies biomaterials and the growth of crystals. She is particularly interested in the process of biomineralization. Estroff studies micro-calcification: small, calcium-laced deposits that are associated with the formation of some cancers, including breast tumors. She creates spatially resolved images of the composition of calcifications using tissue biopsies to better understand the chemistry within the local environment when the biocrystals started to grow.

Estroff was appointed faculty advisor for the "Women in Materials Science and Engineering" program at Cornell in 2007. She was elected Chair of the Materials Science and Engineering at Cornell in 2020.

== Awards and honors ==
- 2006 Empire State Development's Division of Science, Technology and Innovation J.D. Watson Young Investigator Award
- 2009 NSF Early Faculty Career Award
- 2025 AAAS Fellow
- 2026 MRS Fellow

== Selected publications ==
- J Christopher Love; Lara A Estroff; Jennah K Kriebel; Ralph G Nuzzo; Whitesides, George (2005). "Self-assembled monolayers of thiolates on metals as a form of nanotechnology". Chemical Reviews. 105 (4): 1103–1169. doi:10.1021/cr0300789. PMID 15826011. Wikidata Q34410899.
- Lara A Estroff; Andrew D Hamilton (2004). "Water gelation by small organic molecules". Chemical Reviews. 104 (3): 1201–1218. doi:10.1021/cr0302049. PMID 15008620. Wikidata Q34303991.
- Wei Zhang; Saliba, Michael; Moore, David; et al. (2015). "Ultrasmooth organic-inorganic perovskite thin-film formation and crystallization for efficient planar heterojunction solar cells". Nature Communications. 6 (1): 6142. Bibcode:2015NatCo...6.6142Z. doi:10.1038/ncomms7142. PMID 25635571. Wikidata Q57696702.
