= David W. Fraser =

Researcher

David W. Fraser (born 1944) is a researcher, educational leader and epidemiologist, working from 1971 to 1982 for the Centers for Disease Control and Prevention. He also served as President of Swarthmore College from 1982 to 1991.

Fraser graduated from the George School, Haverford College, and Harvard Medical School.

== Epidemiologist ==
He served as a medical epidemiologist at the Centers for Disease Control and Prevention between 1971 and 1982. While there, he directed federal field investigations in Philadelphia in 1976 that led to the discovery of Legionnaires' disease.

== Swarthmore College ==
Fraser served as President of Swarthmore College from 1982 to 1991.

Less than a month into his tenure, Fraser asked the Board of Managers to respond to an amendment to the Military Selective Service Act, which required schools to withhold federal financial aid from students who failed to register for a draft. He felt so strongly about it being unconstitutional that he testified in front of Congress on the subject. Because of his advocacy, Swarthmore was the third in the country to join a Minnesota lawsuit against the amendment. Ultimately, the Board unanimously voted to replace any funds lost by students who declined to register.

== Later career ==
From 1991 to 1995, he headed the Social Welfare Department at the Aga Khan Secretariat, where he directed health, education, and housing activities in Asia and Africa.

From 1995 to 2000, Fraser headed the International Clinical Epidemiology Network.
