= Denis Simon =

American academic administrator

Denis Fred Simon

2nd Executive Vice Chancellor of Duke Kunshan University
- In office August 1, 2015 – July 1, 2020
- Preceded by: Mary Brown Bullock
- Succeeded by: Alfred Bloom

Personal details
- Education: State University of New York at New Paltz (BA); UC Berkeley (MA, PhD)

Denis Simon is an American professor and academic administrator and a Senior Research Fellow at the Quincy Institute for Responsible Statecraft.

He received the People's Republic of China Friendship Award in 2006, an award given to "foreign experts" with "outstanding contributions" to China's economic and social progress.

Simon was previously the Executive Vice Chancellor of Duke Kunshan University in China from 2015-2020, replacing Mary Brown Bullock. He was a professor at the Duke Fuqua School of Business, and a senior adviser to the president for China affairs. At Duke Kunshan University, Simon oversaw the recruitment of the inaugural undergraduate class, campus construction, and faculty development.

In 2021, Simon was named executive director of the Center for Innovation Policy at Duke Law School. In August 2023, Simon resigned from his position at University of North Carolina at Chapel Hill, citing the increasingly challenging environment surrounding academic engagement with China.

== Selected works ==
- Innovation in China: Challenging the Global Science and Technology System (Polity, 2018) (Co-authored with R. Appelbaum, CAO Cong, HAN Xueying)
- China's Emerging Technological Edge: Assessing the Role of High-End Talent (Cambridge University Press, 2009) (co-author CAO Cong)
- After Tiananmen: What Is the Future for Foreign Business in China? California Management Review, 1990
