= Julie Falk =

Julie Falk is the first executive director of Bitch Media. Before her work at Bitch, Falk was the executive director of the Center for Health Justice and worked on legislation that would allow condom distribution within the prison system in California. She was an editor and contributor of Southland Prison News, and was published in Dollars and Sense with her article “Fiscal Lockdown Part II”.

Falk was hired in 2009 to help Bitch Magazine transition into a multimedia non-profit called Bitch Media that publishes the magazine as well as a timely blog, a podcast series entitled “Popaganda” and have a greater online presence. This transition was a response to changes in the publishing industry that demanded more online activity, though Bitch continues to thrive in its print form.
