= Hieropoios =

Magistrate in ancient Athens

The hieropoios (Greek: ἱεροποιός, romanized: hieropoiós, lit. 'supervisor of temples and sacred rites') in ancient Athens was the official in charge of overseeing religious ceremonies and sacrifices. The position could be by allotment, appointment, or inheritance. Generally, the hieropoios was the "overseer of sacred rites". The general consensus states that the term "hiereus" is the most common Greek term used to describe the closest pagan equivalent to a Christian Priest, though hieropoios seems to be more specific, while hiereus serves as an umbrella term.
