= Swarthmore College =

Private college in Pennsylvania, US

Coordinates: 39°54′18″N 75°21′14″W

- Motto: Mind the Light
- Type: Private liberal arts college
- Established: 1864; 162 years ago
- Academic affiliations: COFHE; Quaker Consortium; Space-grant
- Endowment: $2.84 billion (2025)
- President: Valerie Smith
- Faculty: 207 (2026)
- Undergraduates: 1,631 (2026)
- Location: Swarthmore, Pennsylvania, United States
- Campus: Suburban, 425 acres (172 ha)
- College newspaper: The Swarthmore Phoenix
- Colors: Garnet and White
- Nickname: The Garnet
- Sporting affiliations: NCAA Division III – Centennial Conference
- Mascot: Phineas the Phoenix
- Website: swarthmore.edu

Swarthmore College (/ˈswɔːrθmɔːr/ SWORTH-mor, locally /ˈswɑːθmɔːr/ SWAHTH-mor) is a private liberal arts college in Swarthmore, Pennsylvania, United States. Founded in 1864, with its first classes held in 1869, Swarthmore is one of the earliest coeducational colleges in the United States. It was established as a college under the Religious Society of Friends. By 1906, Swarthmore had dropped its religious affiliation and officially became non-sectarian.

Swarthmore is an exclusively undergraduate four-year institution. It is a member of the Tri-College Consortium, a cooperative academic arrangement with Bryn Mawr College and Haverford College. Swarthmore is also affiliated with the University of Pennsylvania through the Quaker Consortium, which allows students to cross-register for classes at all four institutions.

Swarthmore's alumni include six Nobel Prize winners.

== History ==
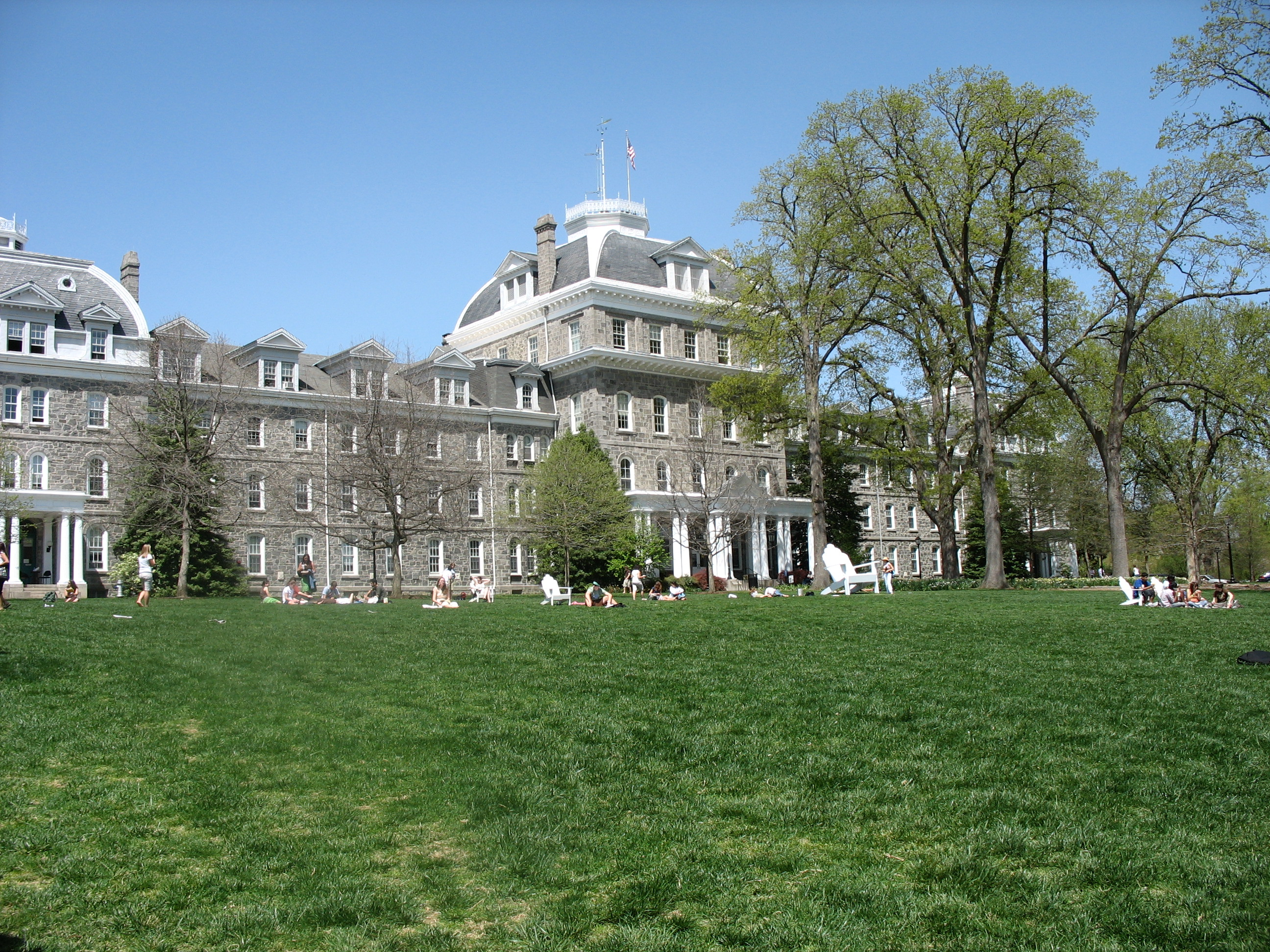
Parrish Hall, named in honor of the first president, Edward Parrish (1822–1872), contains the admissions, housing, and financial aid offices, along with student housing on the upper floors

The name "Swarthmore" has its roots in early Quaker history. In England, Swarthmoor Hall near the town of Ulverston, Cumbria, (previously in Lancashire), was the home of Thomas and Margaret Fell in 1652 when George Fox, fresh from his epiphany atop Pendle Hill in 1651, came to visit. The visitation turned into a long association, as Fox persuaded the couple of his views. Swarthmore was used for the first meetings of what became known as the Religious Society of Friends, later colloquially labeled "Quakers".

The college was founded in 1864 by Deborah Fisher Wharton, along with her industrialist son, Joseph Wharton, together with a committee of members of the Hicksite Yearly Meetings of Philadelphia, New York, and Baltimore. It is the only college founded by the Hicksite branch of the Society of Friends: previous Quaker institutions, like nearby Haverford College, were Orthodox in their founding history. Swarthmore held its first classes in 1869. Edward Parrish (1822–1872) was the first president.

Lucretia Mott (1793–1880) and Martha Ellicott Tyson (1795–1873) were among those Friends who insisted that the new college of Swarthmore be coeducational. Edward Hicks Magill, the second president, served for seventeen years. His daughter, Helen Magill, (1853–1944), was in the first class to graduate in 1873; in 1877, she was the first woman in the United States to earn a Ph.D.

In the early 1900s, the college had a major collegiate American football program during the formation period of the soon-to-be nationwide sport, playing Navy, Princeton, Columbia and other larger schools. It also had an active fraternity and sorority life. The 1921 appointment of Frank Aydelotte as president began the development of the school's current academic focus, particularly with his vision for the honors program based on his experience as a Rhodes Scholar. During World War II, Swarthmore was one of 131 colleges and universities nationwide that participated in the V-12 Navy College Training Program, which offered students a path to a U.S. Navy commission.

Wolfgang Köhler, Hans Wallach, and Solomon Asch were noted psychologists who became professors at Swarthmore, a center for Gestalt psychology. Both Wallach, who was Jewish, and Köhler, who was not, had left Nazi Germany because of its discriminatory policies. Köhler came to Swarthmore in 1935 and served until his retirement in 1958. Wallach came in 1936, first as a researcher, and also taught from 1942 until 1975. Asch joined the faculty in 1947 and served until 1966, conducting his noted conformity experiments at Swarthmore.

The 1960s and 1970s saw the construction of new buildings: Sharples Dining Hall in 1964, Worth Health Center in 1965, the Dana/Hallowell Residence Halls in 1967, and Lang Music Building in 1973. They also saw a 1967 review of the college initiated by president Courtney Smith, a black protest movement, in which African-American students conducted an eight-day sit-in in the admissions office in 1969 to demand increased black enrollment – the sit-in abruptly ended after Smith's death from a heart attack on January 16 – and the establishment of both a Black Cultural Center (1970) and Women's Resource Center (1974). The Environmental Studies program and the Intercultural Center were established in 1992, and in 1993 the Lang Performing Arts Center was opened; the Kohlberg Hall was then established in 1996.

In 1999, the college began purchasing renewable energy credits from wind power, and in the 2002–2003 academic year, it constructed its first green roof.

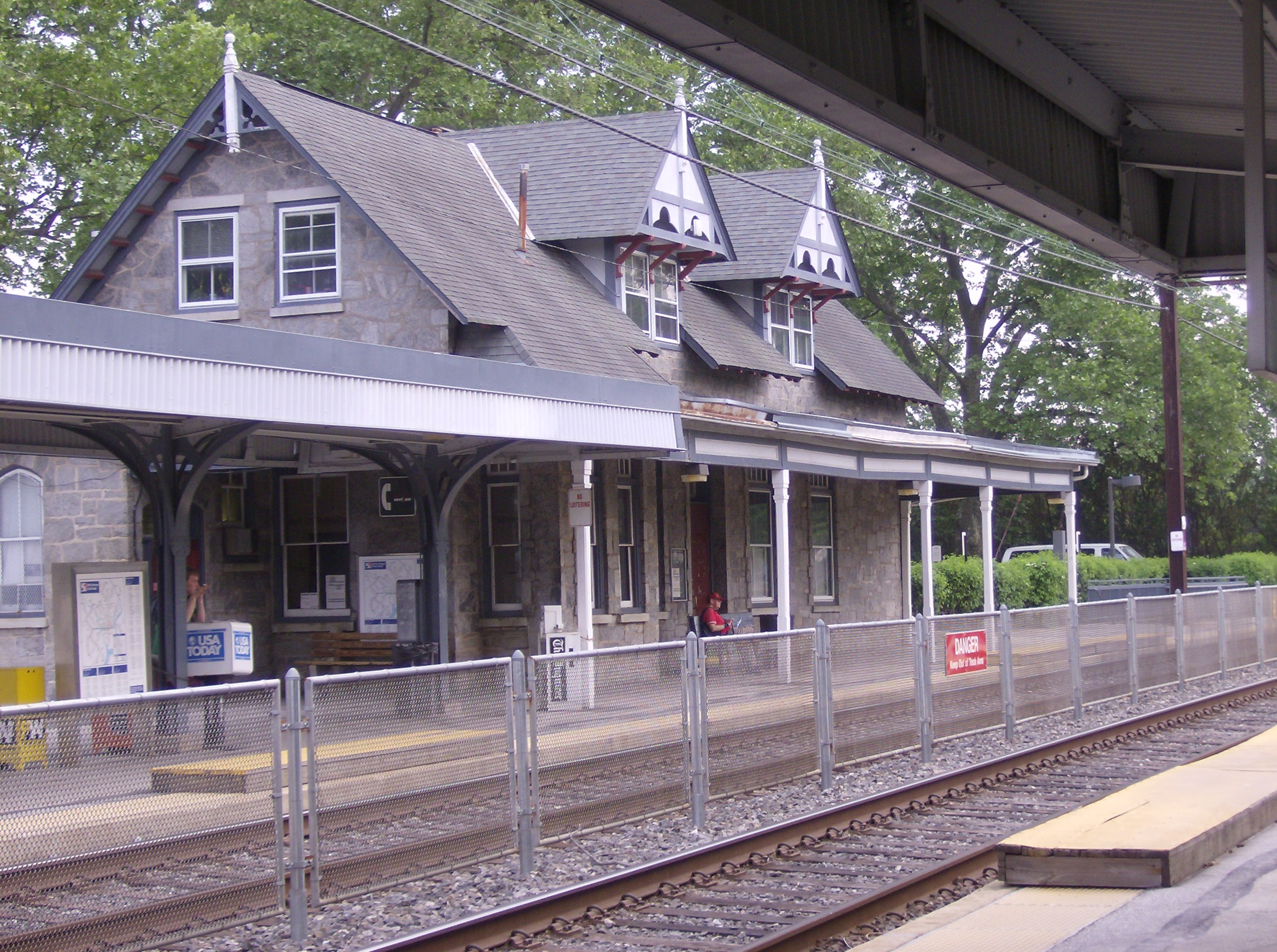
Swarthmore SEPTA Station at the foot of campus

== Campus ==
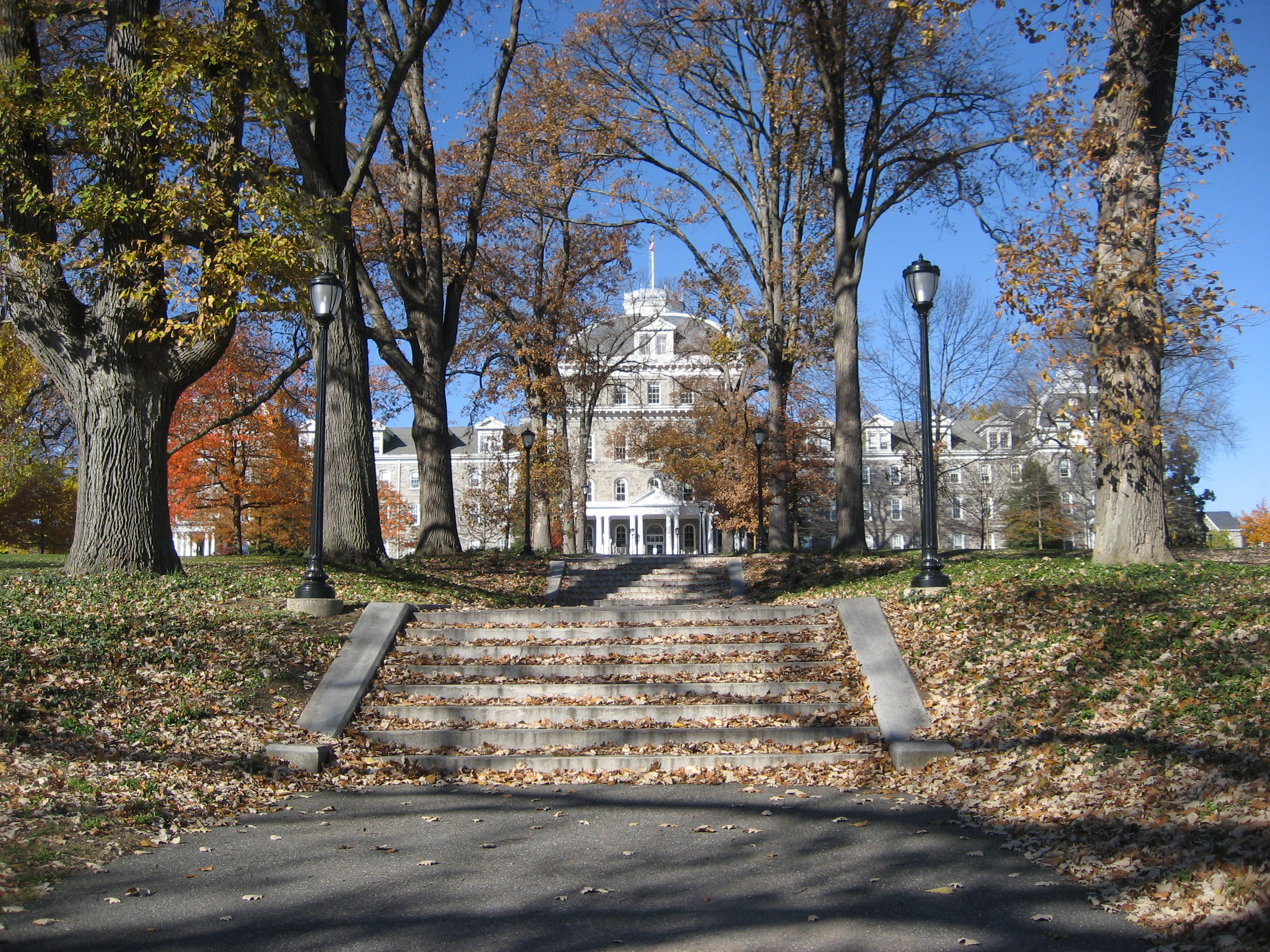
Parrish Hall from Magill Walk

The Swarthmore campus consists of 425 acres (1.72 km^{2}), based on a north–south axis anchored by Parrish Hall, which houses numerous administrative offices and student lounges, as well as two floors of student housing. The fourth floor houses campus radio station WSRN-FM as well as the weekly student newspaper, The Swarthmore Phoenix. From the SEPTA Swarthmore commuter train station and the borough of Swarthmore to the south, the oak-lined Magill Walk leads north up a hill to Parrish. The campus is coterminous with the grounds of the Scott Arboretum.

The majority of the buildings housing classrooms and department offices are located to the north of Parrish, as are Kyle and Woolman dormitories. McCabe Library is to the east of Parrish, as are the dorms Willets, Mertz, Worth, The Lodges, Alice Paul, and David Kemp. To the west are the dorms Wharton, Dana, Hallowell, and Danawell. The Scott Amphitheater, an open wooded outdoor amphitheater, sits just inside the Crum Woods, in which college collections (meetings) and student theatre performances are held. While the amphitheater formerly held commencement, the ceremony has been moved off campus to accommodate increased capacity needs. The Crum Woods extend westward from the main campus, and many buildings on the forest side of the campus incorporate views of the woods. South of Parrish is the Dining Center, attached to the former Sharples dining hall, and other smaller buildings. Dormitories Palmer, Pittenger, Roberts, and the NPPR Apartments are south of the railroad station, as are the athletic facilities, while the Mary Lyon dorm is off-campus to the southwest.

Academic buildings include: Singer Hall, named for alumna Maxine Frank Singer, which was completed in 2021 and houses the biology, engineering, and psychology departments; the Science Center, which houses chemistry, math, and physics, and the Cornell Library of Science and Engineering; Martin Hall, renovated 2025, housing film and media studies and computer science; Kohlberg Hall, which houses anthropology, economics, modern languages, and sociology; Lang Performing Arts Center (LPAC), which houses dance, English, and theater, and the 596 seat Pearson-Hall Theater; and Lang Music Building, which houses Music and Underhill Library for Music and Dance; among others.

The campus is currently undergoing numerous renovations, including the building of a geoexchange system, with the goal of achieving carbon neutrality by 2035.

== Academics ==
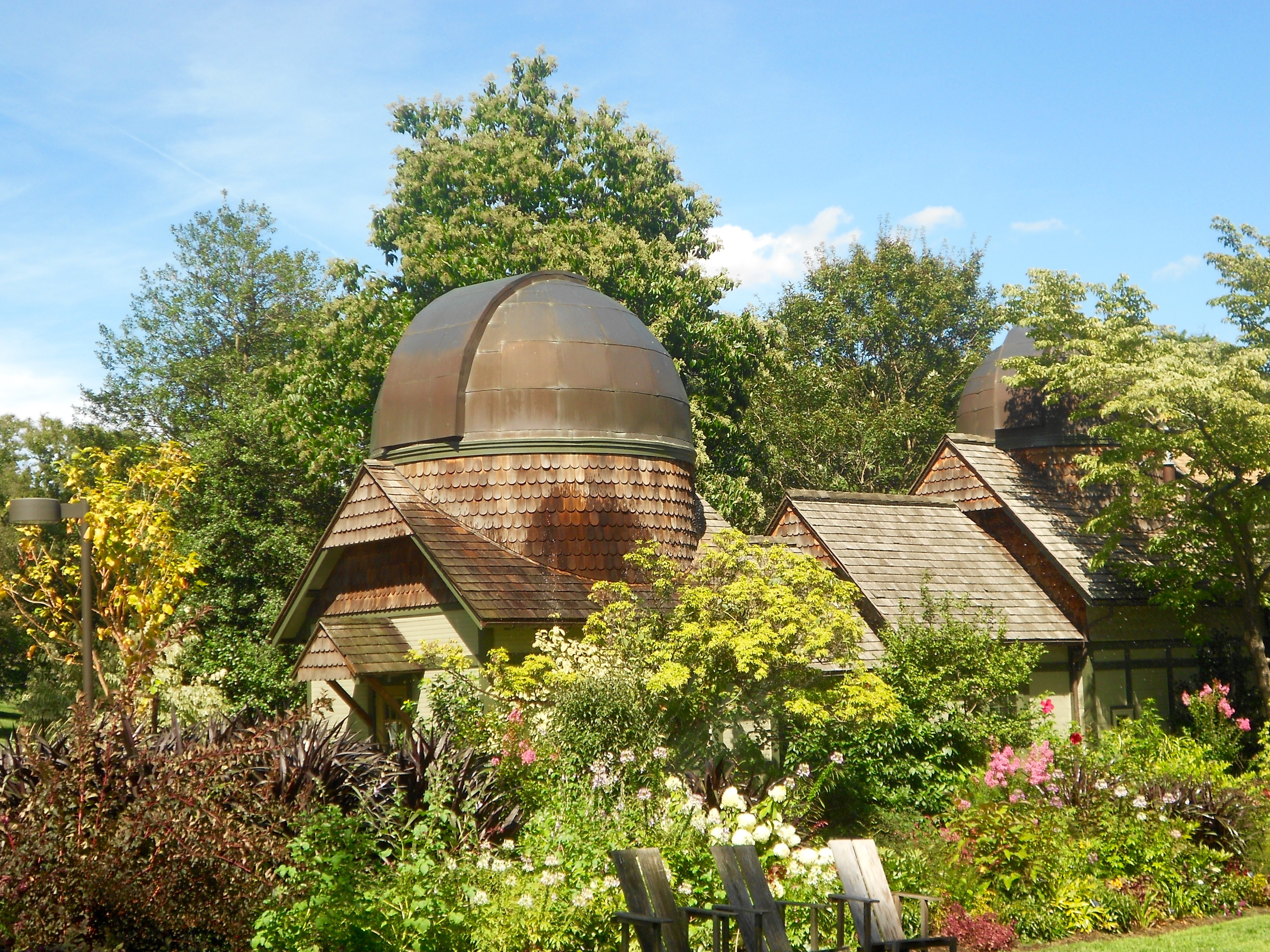
Cunningham House

Swarthmore's Oxbridge tutorial-inspired honors program, introduced in 1922, allows students to take double-credit seminars from their third year, and they often write honors theses. Seminars are usually composed of four to eight students. Students in seminars will usually write at least three ten-page papers per seminar, and often one of these papers is expanded into a twenty to thirty page paper by the end of the seminar. At the end of their final year, Honors students take oral and written examinations conducted by outside experts in their field. Usually, one student in each discipline is awarded "highest honors"; others are either awarded "high honors" or "honors"; rarely, a student is denied honors altogether by the outside examiner. Each department usually has a grade threshold for admission to the honors program.

Uncommon for a liberal arts college, Swarthmore has an engineering program in which, after four years' work, students are granted a B.S. in engineering. Other notable programs include minors in peace and conflict studies, cognitive science, and interpretation theory.

Swathmore offers more than 600 courses per year in over 40 courses of study. Its most popular majors, based on 2021 graduates, were:

- Economics (53)
- Biology/Biological Sciences (37)
- Computer & Information Sciences (36)
- Engineering (23)
- Mathematics (18)
- Research & Experimental Psychology (16)

=== Rankings ===
Academic rankings

Liberal arts
- U.S. News & World Report: 3
- Washington Monthly: 4

National
- Forbes: 23
- WSJ/College Pulse: 11

Some sources, including Greene's Guides, have termed Swarthmore one of the "Little Ivies". In its 2025 college ranking, U.S. News & World Report ranked Swarthmore as the third-best liberal arts college in the nation, behind Williams and Amherst. Forbes magazine ranked Swarthmore 27th in its 2024–25 ranking of the top 500 U.S. colleges, universities, and service academies. Swarthmore ranked third among all institutions of higher education in the United States as measured by the percentage of graduates who went on to earn Ph.D.s between 2013 and 2022.

=== Libraries ===
The college has three main libraries—McCabe Library, the Cornell Library of Science and Engineering, and the Underhill Music and Dance Library—and seven other specialized collections. Friends Historical Library was established in 1871 to collect, preserve, and make available archival, manuscript, printed, and visual records concerning the Religious Society of Friends (Quakers) from their origins in the mid-seventeenth century to the present. Besides the focus on Quaker history, the holdings are a significant research collection for the regional and local history of the middle-Atlantic region of the United States and the history of American social reform. Quakers played prominent roles in almost every major reform movement in American history, including abolition, African-American history, Indian rights, women's rights, prison reform, humane treatment of the mentally ill, and temperance. The collections also reflect the significant role Friends played in the development of science, technology, education, and business in Britain and America. The library also maintains the Swarthmore College Archives and the papers of the Swarthmore Historical Society.

Within the archives is what was formerly known as the Jane Addams Peace Collection and later called the Swarthmore College Peace Collection (SCPC). The SCPC includes papers from Jane Addams' collection and material from over 59 countries. The Nobel Peace Prize, awarded to Addams, is part of the collection. The SCPC states that "Well over fifty percent of all the holdings in the Peace Collection concern women's activism around the world." The SCPC was started when Lucy Biddle Lewis, a member of the board of managers, discovered that Addams was burning her old papers, and convinced her to donate them instead to the Friends Historical Library. After World War II, the librarian at Princeton University, Julian P. Boyd, appraised the papers in the SCPC's collection and found that they were of "rare historic value".

== Student body ==
Admissions statistics
- 2025 entering class
- Admit rate: 7.5% (▼ −1.6)
- Yield rate: 43.6% (▲ +8.1)

Test scores middle 50%^{[i]}
- SAT Total: 1480–1550 (▲ +40 median)
- SAT EBRW: 740–770 (▲ +30 median)
- SAT Math: 740–790 (▲ +20 median)
- ACT Composite: 33–35 (▲ +2 median)

High school GPA^{[ii]}
- Top 10%: 86.7% (▼ −6.3)
- Top 25%: 97.7% (▼ −2.3)
- Top 50%: 100% ( no change)

Swarthmore had an undergraduate student enrollment of 1,647 in 2018. In 2016–2017, it had 187 faculty members (99% with a terminal degree), for a student-faculty ratio of 8:1. The median family income of undergraduates is $165,500, with 53 percent of students coming from the top 10 percent highest-earning families and 18.2 percent from the bottom 60 percent.

== Admissions ==
The college is considered by U.S. News & World Report as "most selective", with 10.7 percent of the 9,383 applicants accepted during the 2016–2017 admissions cycle. The number of applicants was the highest in the college's history and among the highest overall of any liberal arts college. The college saw increases in the number of underrepresented students, first-generation college students, and international students. The college reports that "Twenty-five percent of the admitted students are among the first generation in their family to attend college" and "Of the admitted students attending high schools reporting class rank, 94 percent are in the top decile". The class of 2028 admissions statistics have been fully released, where 13,065 applicants resulted in 975 admits for an admit rate of 7.46%.

== Endowment and tuition fees ==
As a need-blind school, Swarthmore makes admission decisions and financial aid decisions independently. The cost of tuition, student activity fees, room, and board for the 2024–25 academic year was $85,802; tuition fees were $65,058. The college meets 100 percent of admitted student demonstrated need without use of student loans, an important distinction from the many schools that meet 100 percent of demonstrated need, but only through loans (which must be repaid) rather than institutional grant- and scholarship-based funding (which does not require repayment). Financial aid is accessed by 56 percent of the student body, and the average financial aid award was $50,361 during the 2017–18 year.

Swarthmore has the eleventh-largest endowment per undergraduate in the country. Operating revenue for the 2016 fiscal year was $148,086,000, over 50 percent of which was provided by the endowment. Swarthmore ended a $230 million capital campaign on October 6, 2006, when President Bloom declared the project completed, three months ahead of schedule. The campaign, christened the "Meaning of Swarthmore", had been underway officially since the fall of 2001. Out of the college's alumni, 87 percent participated in the effort. Swarthmore's endowment at the end of the 2019 fiscal year was $2.13 billion. Endowment per student was $1,370,157 for the same year, one of the highest rates in the country.

At the end of 2007, the Swarthmore Board of Managers approved the decision for the college to eliminate student loans from all financial aid packages. Instead, additional aid scholarships are granted. Swarthmore went tuition-free for all students from families earning less than $200,000 per year in 2026.

== Student life ==
=== A Cappella ===
The collegiate a cappella groups include Sixteen Feet, the college's oldest group (founded in 1981), as well as its first and only all-male group. Grapevine is its corresponding all-female group (founded in 1983), and Mixed Company is a co-ed group. Essence of Soul is the college's all-Black group. The youngest group, OffBeat, was founded in the fall of 2013 as a group open to all genders and identities. In addition, Chaverim is a co-ed group that includes students from the Tri-College Consortium and draws on music from cultures around the world for its repertoire. The groups, self-run as volunteer clubs with college support, travel to other schools to participate in concerts. Once every semester, all of the school's a cappella groups collaborate for a joint concert called Jamboree, which includes visiting groups from other colleges and universities.

=== Swarthmore Fire and Protective Association ===
Swarthmore College students are eligible to participate in the local emergency department, the Swarthmore Fire and Protective Association. They are trained as firefighters and as emergency medical technicians (EMTs) and are qualified on both the state and national level. The fire department responds to over 200 fire calls and almost 800 EMS calls a year. A fire horn, colloquially deemed the "fire moose", is located within the Swarthmore campus, and its sound has become a fixture of campus life.

=== Swarthmore College Computer Society ===
Swarthmore College Computer Society (SCCS) is a student-run volunteer organization independent of the official ITS department of the college. SCCS operates a set of servers that provide web applications for the Swarthmore College community, e-mail accounts, Unix shell login accounts, server storage space and webspace to students, professors, alumni and other student-run organizations. SCCS hosts over 100 mailing lists used by various student groups and over 130 organizational websites.

=== Mock trial ===
Founded in 2000, the Swarthmore mock trial team placed tenth at the 2000 American Mock Trial Association (AMTA) National Championship Tournament and was awarded "Best New School". Dennis Cheng '01 was awarded the prestigious "Spirit of AMTA" award in 2000. Swarthmore's team placed second at the 2001 AMTA National Championship Tournament. The Swarthmore Mock Trial program has also won numerous accolades and boasted a team of over 25 members for the 2013–2014 season. The 2010–2011 competitive season resulted in all three teams competing at Regional Championships, two teams going on to Opening Round Championships, and one team qualifying and competing at the 2011 National Championships held in Des Moines, Iowa, where the team placed 15th in their division. Other successes included placing first at the Philadelphia Regional competition in February 2011 and winning the University of Massachusetts Amherst's invitational tournament in February 2014.

=== The Swarthmore Phoenix ===
The Swarthmore Phoenix has been the independent campus newspaper of Swarthmore College since 1881 or 1882. The phoenix has deep roots in Swarthmore lore. When the college's iconic Parrish Hall was gutted by fire in 1881, it was immediately rebuilt, rising, some noted, from the ashes like the bird found in Egyptian and Greek mythology. Thereafter, The Phoenix became the name of the campus newspaper. With an early staff that often numbered fewer than ten people, The Phoenix was first published monthly, then moved to a bi-weekly schedule in 1894. It is now published weekly. The Phoenix first appeared online in September 1995. The newspaper is printed by Hocking News in Lancaster County.

=== Voices (and The Daily Gazette) ===
Voices was founded in 2017 as "an online news publication solely dedicated to centering marginalized voices and creating space for them to tell their own stories", in response to controversial articles about African-American protests in the already-existing online publication The Daily Gazette. In May 2018, The Daily Gazette, which had been published since 1996, merged with The Phoenix.

=== Magazines ===
There are several magazines at Swarthmore, most of which are published semi-annually at the end of each semester. One is Spike, Swarthmore's humor magazine, founded in 1993. The others are literary magazines, including Nacht, which publishes long-form non-fiction, fiction, poetry and artwork; Small Craft Warnings, which publishes poetry, fiction and artwork; Scarlet Letters, which publishes women's literature; Enie, for Spanish literature; Visibility Zine, for literature and art by historically marginalized groups; OURstory, for literature relating to diversity issues; Bug-Eyed Magazine, a very limited-run science fiction/fantasy magazine published by Psi Phi, formerly known as Swarthmore Warders of Imaginative Literature (SWIL); Remappings (formerly "CelebrASIAN"), published by the Swarthmore Asian Organization; Alchemy, a collection of academic writings published by the Swarthmore Writing Associates; Mjumbe, published by the Swarthmore African-American Student Society; and a magazine for French literature. An erotica magazine, ! (pronounced "bang") was briefly published in 2005 in homage to an earlier publication, Untouchables. Most of the literary magazines print approximately 500 copies, with around 100 pages. There is also a photography magazine, Pun/ctum, which features work from students and alumni.

=== Radio station ===
WSRN 91.5 FM is the college radio station. It has a mix of indie, rock, hip-hop, electronic dance, folk, world, jazz and classical music, as well as a number of radio talk shows. At one time, WSRN had a significant news department and covered events such as the 1969 black protest movement extensively.

== Athletics ==
Swarthmore College athletics wordmark

In 2008, Swarthmore's first mascot, Phineas the Phoenix, made its debut. Swarthmore's athletic department has 22 varsity intercollegiate sports teams including badminton, baseball, basketball, cross country, field hockey, golf, lacrosse, soccer, softball, swimming, tennis, track and field, and volleyball. The football team was controversially eliminated in 2000, along with wrestling and, initially, badminton. The Board of Managers cited a lack of athletes on campus and the difficulty of recruiting as reasons for terminating the programs.

The department also offers several club sport options, including men's and women's rugby, ultimate frisbee, volleyball, fencing and squash. The participation rate of students in intercollegiate or club sports is 40 percent. Swarthmore is a charter member of the Centennial Conference, a group of private colleges in Pennsylvania and Maryland, and is a member of NCAA Division III.

The men's basketball team is currently coached by Landry Kosmalski, who was named Division III's National Coach of the Year in 2020. In the 2018–19 season, the Garnet reached the NCAA Division III Championship Game for the first time but lost to the University of Wisconsin–Oshkosh 96–82. The 2019–20 team began the season 26–0 and were the last unbeaten team remaining out of all of Division I, II and III. The Garnet were ranked No. 1 in the nation by D3hoops.com for the entirety of the season, becoming the first team to be ranked at the top of that poll from start to finish.

Swarthmore has won 26 Centennial Conference team championships and claims four national championships in men's lacrosse in 1900, 1904, 1905, and 1910, four national championships in men's tennis in 1977, 1981, 1985, and 1990, two men's tennis doubles national championships in 1976 and 1985, and two individual championships in women's track and field in 2016 and 2023.

== Notable people ==
Swarthmore's alumni include six Nobel Prize winners, namely the 2024 physics laureate John Hopfield (1954), the 2006 physics laureate John C. Mather (1968), the 2004 economics laureate Edward Prescott (1962), the 1975 physiology or medicine laureates David Baltimore (1960) and Howard Martin Temin (1955), and the 1972 chemistry laureate Christian B. Anfinsen (1937). Alumni also include fourteen MacArthur Fellows and hundreds of other prominent figures in law, art, science, business, politics, and other fields.

Other prominent alumni include former Massachusetts governor Michael Dukakis (1955), astronomer Sandra Faber (1966), novelist and essayist Jonathan Franzen (1981), Hawaii governor Josh Green (1992), Tony Award-nominated actor and playwright Stephen Lang (1973), former US Senator Carl Levin (1956), philosopher David K. Lewis (1962), Pulitzer Prize-winning novelist James A. Michener (1929), co-creator of the Myers–Briggs Type Indicator assessment Isabel Briggs Myers (1919), philosopher who coined the terms "hypertext" and "hypermedia" Ted Nelson (1959), suffragist Alice Paul (1905), astronaut and first American woman in space Sally Ride (non-graduate), "mother of the Hubble Space Telescope" Nancy Roman (1946), musical composer and satirist Peter Schickele (1957) US Congressman Chris Van Hollen (1983), and former World Bank president Robert Zoellick (1976).

Notable faculty include psychologists Solomon Asch and Wolfgang Köhler, philosopher of art Monroe Beardsley, and economist Frederic Pryor.

== Bibliography ==
- Walton, Richard J. (1986). Swarthmore College: An Informal History. The Swarthmore. ISBN 978-1125133866. OCLC 988369430.
