= Disneyland Resort Paris 15th Anniversary =

2007 year-long celebration

The Disneyland Resort Paris 15th Anniversary Celebration was a year-long celebration event at the Disneyland Paris holiday resort in Marne-la-Vallée near Paris, France, to mark fifteen years of operation.

The events officially began on 1 April 2007, following a day of press events and premieres on 31 March 2007. The celebration was originally planned to end on 31 March 2008. However, the celebration was extended until 7 March 2009. The celebration was replaced by Mickey's Magical Party from 4 April 2009.

The music used on the advert is the song "Flying" from James Newton Howard's soundtrack of Universal Pictures/Columbia Pictures' 2003 film version of Peter Pan. It is also played during the Candleabration in the park.

== Additions ==
=== Attractions ===
- Crush's Coaster
- Cars Quatre Roues Rallye
- The Twilight Zone Tower of Terror
- Stitch Live

=== Entertainment ===
- Disney's Once Upon a Dream Parade
- Candleabration
- Disney Characters' Express
- Alpha Bet You Are (2007 Spring and summer only)
- High School Musical on Tour (2007-2008 Spring and summer only)
- Disney Villains' Halloween Showtime (Halloween)
- Enchanted Candleabration (Christmas)
- Minnie's Jolly Holidays Show (Christmas)
- High School Musical 2: School's Out! (2008 Spring and summer only)
- Toon Train: Lights... Camera... Musique! (Spring and summer only)
- Mickey's Not-So-Scary Halloween Parties (Halloween)

=== Theming projects ===
- Toon Studio
- Hollywood Boulevard and Vine Street

=== Shops ===
- Tower Hotel Gifts
- Disney Fashion
