= Goat Hall Productions =

Opera and theatre company (1997–present) in San Francisco, California, U.S.

Goat Hall Productions (GHP) is an opera company and musical theatre company based in Potrero Hill in San Francisco, California, United States. Presenting programs under the names San Francisco Cabaret Opera, Fresh Voices Festival of New Works, and The Kurt Weill Project, it was co-founded in 1997 by Harriet March Page and Dave Hurlbert, and is dedicated to the performance of opera and song, with a special interest in contemporary music.

They have presented works by Henry Purcell, John Pepusch, W.A. Mozart, Franz Schubert, Robert Schumann, Johann Strauss II, Gustav Mahler, Ralph Vaughan Williams, Igor Stravinsky, Francis Poulenc, Kurt Weill, Gian Carlo Menotti, Benjamin Britten, Leonard Bernstein, Stephen Sondheim, and living composers—particularly those of the San Francisco Bay Area.

== History ==
Goat Hall was founded in the venue of that name, located at 400 Missouri Street in San Francisco's Potrero Hill district—the former home of the Pickle Family Circus.

The group has presented world, U.S., and San Francisco premieres of works including those of Mark Alburger, Greg Bartholomew, John G. Bilotta, Daniel Felsenfeld, Steven Clark, Alden Jenks, Veronika Krausas, Lisa Scola Prosek, Mona Lyn Reese, Mary Watkins, and Cynthia Weyuker. Since 2001, GHP has also presented productions elsewhere in San Francisco (including Community Music Center, EXIT Theatre, Old First Church, Potrero Hill Neighborhood House, and Thick House), as well as Berkeley (Julia Morgan Chamber Arts House, and Live Oak Theatre), Oakland (Chapel of the Chimes and Oakland Metro Opera), and San Rafael (Dominican University of California).

The organization's Artistic Director and Founder is Harriet March Page. Mark Alburger is Music Director. Guest artists have included Janis Martin (soprano) and Erling Wold, the latter on a collaborative program with San Francisco Composers Chamber Orchestra.

GHP has been covered by Berkeley Daily Planet, East Bay Express, San Francisco Bay Guardian, and San Francisco Chronicle.

Goat Hall has received support from the Ann and Gordon Getty Foundation, William and Flora Hewlett Foundation, Marra Foundation, Meet the Composer, MetLife Foundation, Theatre Bay Area CASH Grants, and the Zellerbach Family Foundation.

With its annual Fresh Voices programs, Goat Hall Productions is at the forefront of presenting new operas and songs in the San Francisco Bay Area, having showcased more than 120 new works in the last decade.
