= Prosek =

Prosek or Prošek may refer to:

== Places ==
- Prosek, North Macedonia, an archaeological site in North Macedonia
- Prosek, Niška Banja, a village in Serbia
- Prosek (Prague), a neighbourhood in Prague
  - Prosek (Prague Metro), a Prague Metro station
  - Stadion SK Prosek, a football stadium
- Prosecco (Trieste), a village in Italy, known as Prosek in Slovenian

== People ==
- James Prosek (born 1975), American artist
- Lisa Scola Prosek (born 1958), American composer
- Bohumil Prošek (1931–2014), Czech ice hockey player
- Roman Prošek (born 1980), Czech ice hockey defenceman
- Václav Prošek (born 1993), Czech footballer

== Other ==
- Prošek, a type of wine from Dalmatia
