= Hollywood Boulevard (disambiguation) =

Hollywood Boulevard is a boulevard in Hollywood, Los Angeles, California, United States.

Hollywood Boulevard may also refer to:

- Florida State Road 820 in Hollywood, Florida, also known as Hollywood Boulevard
- The Hollywood Boulevard Commercial and Entertainment District in Hollywood, California, United States
- The Hollywood Boulevard Historic Business District in Hollywood, Florida, United States
- Hollywood Boulevard (1936 film), directed by Robert Florey
- Hollywood Boulevard (1976 film), directed by Joe Dante and Allan Arkush
- Hollywood Blvd., USA, a 2013 animated short film by Stephen Hillenburg
- Hollywood Boulevard (Walt Disney Studios Park), a studio lot at Walt Disney Studios Park in Disneyland Resort Paris
- "Hollywood Boulevard", a song by the band Big Audio Dynamite
