= Little Girl Lost (The Twilight Zone) =

- The Twilight Zone episode
- Episode no.: Season 3 Episode 26
- Directed by: Paul Stewart
- Written by: Richard Matheson
- Based on: Short story by Richard Matheson
- Production code: 4828
- Original air date: March 16, 1962

Guest appearances
- Sarah Marshall: Ruth Miller; Robert Sampson: Chris Miller; Charles Aidman: Bill; Tracy Stratford: Tina Miller; Rhoda Williams: Tina's voice

Episode chronology
| ← Previous "The Fugitive" | Next → "Person or Persons Unknown" |
- The Twilight Zone (1959 TV series) (season 3)

"Little Girl Lost" is episode 91 of the American television anthology series The Twilight Zone. It is about a young girl who has accidentally passed through an opening into another dimension. Her parents and their friend attempt to locate and retrieve her. It is based on the 1953 science fiction short story by Richard Matheson. The title of the episode comes from a poem by William Blake, from his collection Songs of Innocence and of Experience.

== Opening narration ==
Missing: one frightened little girl. Name: Bettina Miller. Description: six years of age, average height and build, light brown hair, quite pretty. Last seen being tucked in bed by her mother a few hours ago. Last heard: 'ay, there's the rub,' as Hamlet put it. For Bettina Miller can be heard quite clearly, despite the rather curious fact that she can't be seen at all. Present location? Let's say for the moment... in the Twilight Zone.

== Plot ==
A married couple, Chris and Ruth Miller, are awakened by the whimpering of their little daughter, Tina. Chris goes to see what the trouble is. Their dog, Mack, begins to bark from the backyard. Chris cannot find Tina either in or under the bed, even though her pleas for help seem to be coming from nearby, yet far away. He calls Ruth into the room, and she is similarly mystified. Chris phones his physicist friend, Bill, for help, and opens the door to let the incessantly barking Mack into the house. The dog runs under the bed and disappears, but can still be heard barking, again close, but far away.

Bill arrives and helps Chris move the bed so that he can physically scan the area where it was, marking the legs with books. When this proves fruitless, Bill examines the wall behind the bed. Finding that his hand can pass easily through the wall and to another dimension, he draws marks on the wall outlining the apparent boundary. He explains to Chris and Ruth that sometimes lines in a three-dimensional universe run parallel with, rather than perpendicular to, the fourth dimension. He warns them that they know nothing of what might lie beyond this portal, and should they follow Tina into the fourth dimension, they would only become hopelessly lost as well, since it is not like the three dimensions humans can perceive.

Chris calls to Mack to guide Tina back. Mack leads Tina to the source of Chris's voice, but they still cannot find the entrance. Despite Bill's warnings, Chris reaches into the portal and falls into the fourth dimension, an abstract, crystalline landscape that seems distorted, and constantly turning upside down and sideways. Bill advises him not to move. Chris sees Tina and Mack and calls them towards him. Bill calls for him to hurry. When Tina and Mack close in on Chris, Bill grabs them and pulls them back into the bedroom. Ruth rushes Tina to another room.

Bill explains that Chris was only halfway through the portal, despite Chris's perception that he was standing up in the new dimension. Bill was in fact holding onto Chris the entire time. He was telling Chris to hurry because the portal was closing. Bill knocks on the wall, showing that the portal has completely solidified and closed. He explains that if Chris had taken a few more seconds, the two halves of his body might have become trapped half in his dimension and half in the fourth dimension.

== Closing narration ==
The other half where? The fourth dimension? The fifth? Perhaps. They never found the answer. Despite a battery of research physicists equipped with every device known to man, electronic and otherwise, no result was ever achieved, except perhaps a little more respect for and uncertainty about the mechanisms of the Twilight Zone.

== Production notes ==
Matheson wrote the short story based on a real-life incident involving his young daughter, who fell off her bed while asleep and rolled against a wall. Despite hearing their daughter's cries for help, Matheson and his wife were initially unable to locate her.

The voice of Tina in the alternate dimension was played by voice actor Rhoda Williams, who was then 32 years old.

== Critical reception ==
The critic Camille Paglia calls "Little Girl Lost" the "first great script" of The Twilight Zone in Sexual Personae (1990).

== References in other media ==
"Little Girl Lost" was parodied in "Homer^{3}", a segment of "Treehouse of Horror VI", an episode from the seventh season of The Simpsons. In the episode, the two-dimensional characters attempt to retrieve Homer from the third dimension. Homer likens his entrance to the third dimension to "something out of that twilighty show about that zone".

An area of the queue for The Twilight Zone Tower of Terror theme park attractions in Florida and Paris uses subtle effects to simulate air currents coming out of a solid wall, as well as playing a subtle recording of the little girl's dialogue at intervals. In the exit area of the Florida version of the attraction, there is an area of the wall outlined in chalk, exactly like the portal in the episode. It has also been cited as one of the most influential episodes in the development of the ride, most notably with the "5th Dimension" scene in the Florida version.

Some (including Richard Matheson) have noted similarities between the episode and the 1982 film Poltergeist.

Peter Straub alludes to the episode in his novel Lost Boy, Lost Girl.

== Theoretical basis ==
Although not intended by the writers, the hole into the other dimension was later given as an example of a "Riemannian cut", which is a type of wormhole formed when two spaces join at the same set of points.

== Music ==
Bernard Herrmann's score for the episode is written for an unusual chamber ensemble of four flutes (doubling on piccolos, and alto and bass flutes), four harps, percussion (one player, utilizing tambourine, tam-tams, and vibraphone), and viola d'amore. It has been performed as a concert suite by the San Francisco Composers Chamber Orchestra. The episode's director, Paul Stewart, worked with Herrmann as associate producer of Orson Welles's The Mercury Theatre on the Air and played the butler Raymond in the first film Herrmann scored, Citizen Kane.

== Sources ==
- DeVoe, Bill. (2008). Trivia from The Twilight Zone. Albany, GA: Bear Manor Media. ISBN 978-1-59393-136-0
- Grams, Martin. (2008). The Twilight Zone: Unlocking the Door to a Television Classic. Churchville, MD: OTR Publishing. ISBN 978-0-9703310-9-0
