= Rhoda Williams =

American actress (1930–2006)

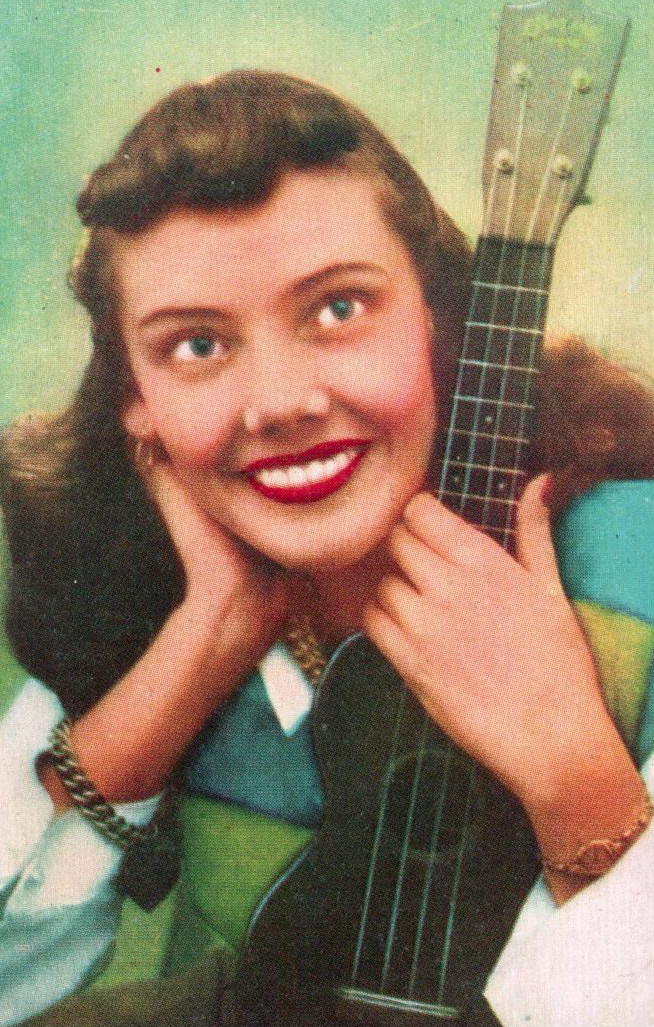
- Williams in 1953
- Born: Rhoda Elaine Williams; July 19, 1930; Denver, Colorado, US
- Died: March 8, 2006 (aged 75); Eugene, Oregon, US
- Occupations: Actress, voice artist
- Years active: 1935–1992
- Known for: Voice of Drizella Tremaine in Walt Disney film Cinderella

Rhoda Elaine Williams (July 19, 1930 – March 8, 2006) was an American actress best known as Drizella Tremaine in Cinderella.

== Early life and education ==
Rhoda Williams was born on July 19, 1930, in Denver, Colorado. She learned to read at age three, and performing on radio came naturally to her. She soon had her own local weekly show on KMPC's, We Who Are Young.

Williams graduated from Hollywood High School when she was 14, following which she earned a degree in theatre arts at the University of California.

== Early radio 1937–57 ==
In 1949, Williams began a 5-year stint as Robert Young's oldest daughter, Betty, on Father Knows Best.

== Motion pictures ==
During this period, she also appeared in movies such as National Velvet, Meet John Doe, and That Hagen Girl.

In Cinderella, she voiced Cinderella’s stepsister, Drizella. She attended Hollywood High School, earning a BA degree from UCLA at age 18.

== Early life and filmed television ==
With the advent of television, Williams moved into the new medium on such early live shows as Lights, Camera, Action! and Slice of Life and, with the advent of film TV, Date With Judy, Chrysler Theatre, Laredo, The Big Valley, Run for Your Life, Dragnet, Ironside, Project UFO, Marcus Welby, M.D., Policewoman, and Barnaby Jones. She appeared on Superior Court and General Hospital and provided alien voices for Star Trek IV and Star Trek V.

== Voice overs ==
She also specialized in voices and dialects and was the "voice" for Brigitte Bardot in the American version of The Night Heaven Fell, as well as voicing a 9-year-old French boy in The Jayhawkers!. She returned to Walt Disney Studios as the voice and model for the AudioAnimatronic mother and teen-age daughter at the General Electric "Carousel of Progress" at Disneyland. She also did uncredited voice work for an episode of The Twilight Zone, "Little Girl Lost".

== Graduate study and teaching ==
In 1968, she started work on her master's degree at California State University, Northridge. While studying for her degree, she began a second career as a teacher of dialects and speech for the stage. First at CSUN's Summer Teenage Drama Workshop, then during the regular sessions. She also created a filmstrip on "Medieval Theatre" which was distributed by Oleson Films to high schools and colleges throughout the country. She received her Master of Arts degree in theatre in 1972 and continued to teach at CSUN intermittently. She also taught voice and speech at Estelle Harman's Actor's Workshop in Hollywood.

== Work for the union ==
She began a long association with various civic and professional organizations in 1959, when she served as PTA President for Alexandria Avenue School in Los Angeles. She joined the Screen Actors Guild (SAG) in 1937 and the American Federation of Television and Radio Artists (AFTRA) in 1939. While she was a member of the Los Angeles Local, she was a Local and National Board member, Local Education Committee Chair, Co-Chair of the L.A. Women's Committee, Western Region Chair of the National Women's Committee, and member of the joint AFTRA-SAG Merger Study Committee. She also edited the Los Angeles Local publication, DIALLOG. from 1974 to 1987.

From 1978 until 1981, she was West Coast Coordinator for a CETA project to increase employment for professionals in the performing arts. From 1981 to 1982, she was assistant executive director of the Los Angeles Local of AFTRA. In January 1993, after her move to Oregon, Williams was elected to the local board of the Portland Local of AFTRA, where she was Treasurer and Alternate to the AFTRA National Board. She and her husband were also editors of the SAG/AFTRA Portland newsletter for AFTRA and SAG.

In Los Angeles, she was a vice-president and secretary of the Los Angeles Chapter of the Coalition of Labor Union Women (CLUW). She also served several years as an appointee to the State Wage Board for the Broadcasting Industry and was an AFTRA delegate to the Los Angeles County Federation of Labor, AFL-CIO. For the California State Federation of Labor, she coordinated and conducted the Communications Skills workshop at the Federation's "Women In The Workforce" conferences from 1977 until 1989.She has also taught Communication skills at the AFL-CIO's Western Section Summer School for Labor Union Women.

From 1984 until 1992, she was secretary-treasurer of the UCLA Theater Film and Television Alumni Association and was one of the charter members of that organization. She has also been secretary of the InterGuild Women's Caucus. an organization of women in the entertainment industry guilds and unions. which awarded her its Distinguished Service Award. She was a founding member of the Education Council of the Los Angeles Music Center, with special interest in the Music Center on Tour program; a past member of the Glendale Arts Council Board; a founding member of Pacific Pioneer Broadcasters; and an honorary member of REPS (Radio Enthusiasts of Puget Sound) and of SPERDVAC (The Society for the Preservation of Radio Drama. Variety and Comedy).

Williams performed at local theaters in Eugene, Oregon. "Pirates" at the Lord Leebrick Theater (now Oregon Contemporary Theatre), and "70 Girls 70" at the Very Little Theater.

== Death ==
On March 8, 2006, Williams died from cardiac arrest at her home in Eugene, Oregon, at the age of 75.

== Partial filmography ==
- Stolen Heaven (1938) - Young Girl (uncredited)
- National Velvet (1944) - Schoolgirl (uncredited)
- The Corn Is Green (1945) - Wylodine (uncredited)
- Our Vines Have Tender Grapes (1945) - Marguerite Larsen - School Girl (uncredited)
- That Hagen Girl (1947) - College Student (uncredited)
- Mr. Belvedere Goes to College (1949) - Sorority Girl (uncredited)
- House of Strangers (1949) - Woman (uncredited)
- All the King's Men (1949) - Undetermined Role (uncredited)
- Cinderella (1950) - Drizella (voice)
- A Woman of Distinction (1950) - Minor Role (uncredited)
- The Persuader (1957) - Nell Landis
- Space Master X-7 (1958) - Stewardess Archer
- High School Hellcats (1958) - Trudy Davis
- The Heart Is a Rebel (1958) - Miss Canfield - Hal's Secretary
- The Sergeant Was a Lady (1961) - Lt. Witt
- Critic's Choice (1963) - Telephone Operator (uncredited)
- Triangle (1970)
