= Mark Alburger =

American composer and conductor (1957 – 2023)

- Born: April 2, 1957; Upper Darby Township, Pennsylvania, U.S.
- Died: June 20, 2023 (aged 66); Vacaville, California, U.S.
- Education: Swarthmore College, Dominican University of California, Claremont Graduate University (Ph.D.)
- Occupations: Composer, conductor, music journalist
- Organizations: San Francisco Composers Chamber Orchestra, Goat Hall Productions / San Francisco Cabaret Opera
- Known for: Founder of the San Francisco Composers Chamber Orchestra, editor-publisher of 21st-Century Music Journal
- Notable work: Large opus including concerti, operas, song cycles, symphonies, and a 13-hour theatrical setting of the Bible
- Partner: Harriet March Page

Mark Alburger (April 2, 1957 – June 20, 2023) was an American composer and conductor active in the San Francisco Bay Area. He was the founder and music director of the San Francisco Composers Chamber Orchestra, as well as the music director of Goat Hall Productions / San Francisco Cabaret Opera. Alburger was also the editor and publisher of 21st-Century Music Journal, which he founded in 1994 as 20th-Century Music.

== Biography ==
Mark Alburger was born on April 2, 1957, in Upper Darby Township, Pennsylvania. He studied composition with Gerald Levinson and Joan Panetti at Swarthmore College; Jules Langert at the Dominican University of California; and Roland Jackson, Thomas Flaherty, and Christopher Yavelow at Claremont Graduate University, where he was awarded a Ph.D. in musicology in 1996. He also studied privately thereafter with Terry Riley. Alburger was best known for his use of troping techniques, combining structures and musical passages from a wide variety of pre-existing works across cultures and eras. He has a large opus list, including many concerti, operas, song cycles, symphonies, and a thirteen-hour theatrical setting of the Bible.

As a music journalist, he has published interviews with many notable composers across the new music scene, including Henry Brant, Earle Brown, George Crumb, Anthony Davis, Paul Dresher, Philip Glass, Ali Akbar Khan, Joan La Barbara, Steve Mackey, Tod Machover, Meredith Monk, Pauline Oliveros, Steve Reich, Erling Wold, Christian Wolff, and Pamela Z, and was a contributor to The New Grove Dictionary of Music and Musicians.

Alburger died on June 20, 2023, in Vacaville, California, and is survived by his partner Harriet March Page, a mezzo-soprano and artistic director of Goat Hall Productions / San Francisco Cabaret Opera.
