= Lisa Scola Prosek =

American classical composer (born 1958)

Lisa Scola Prosek (born March 25, 1958) is an American composer and librettist. Among her compositions are two oratorios and seven operas. She is San Francisco Bay Area-based.

== Life and career ==
Scola Prosek was born in New Jersey and raised in Rome. She graduated from Princeton University, where she studied with Milton Babbitt, Edward T. Cone, Lukas Foss, and Gaetano Giani Luporini. She was commissioned by San Francisco's Thick House Theater for her operas Daughter of the Red Tzar, Belfagor and Sail the Blue Aegean. Her first operatic composition was Satyricon which premiered in 2002.

She is the recipient of several commissions, grants and awards, including from the Argosy Foundation Contemporary Music Fund, the LEF Foundation, Meet The Composer, Theatre Bay Area, The Hewlett Foundation, the Zellerbach Foundation, and the American Composers Forum.

In addition to her work as a composer, she is principal pianist and general manager of the San Francisco Composers Chamber Orchestra.

== Works ==
=== Chamber operas ===
- Satyricon (2002)
- I Quaderni di Leonardo (2006). Opera in Italian, text by the composer, with chamber orchestra, Thick House Theater, San Francisco. Videography by Jakub Kalousek. Jim Cave, director.
- Belfagor (2007). Based on Machiavelliʼs novella Belfagor arcidiavolo. Thick House Theater, San Francisco. Performed as a Video-Opera with chamber orchestra, Martha Stoddard, conducting. Directed by Jim Cave.
- Trap Door (2008). A chamber video opera. Commissioned by The Lab/Art group. Residency at The Lab, 16th Street, San Francisco. In English, based on one soldierʼs experiences in Iraq. Directed by Jim Cave, video sets by Jakub Kalousek.
- Dieci Giorni (2010). Premiered at Thick House in San Francisco, written in collaboration with composer Erling Wold based on Boccaccio's The Decameron.
- Daughter of the Red Tzar (2012). Commissioned for Thick House Theater and produced with Art Space Development Corporation and First Look Sonoma.
- The Lariat (2014). Based on The Lariat, a novella by Jaime de Angulo. The first public workshop performance took place at San Francisco's Un-Scripted Theatre in June 2014.

=== Choral works and song cycles ===
- Libera Me (2006). For Choir and orchestra: Schola Cantorum San Francisco and the San Francisco Composers Chamber Orchestra, Old First Church, San Francisco.
- En una Noche (2006). For the National Shrine of St. Francis of Assisi, Song cycle for soprano and viola, with texts from Saint John of the Cross.
