= John Duykers =

American tenor

John Duykers (born September 30, 1944, in Butte, Montana) is an American operatic tenor, known for his work in modern and contemporary opera. He made his formal debut with the Seattle Opera in 1966.

== Career ==
Duykers has appeared with the New York City Opera (Don José to Susanne Marsee's Carmen), and the opera companies in Chicago (title part of Tannhäuser), San Francisco (The Hunchback in Die Frau ohne Schatten, with Dame Gwyneth Jones and Anja Silja), Houston (Aegisthus in Elektra), Santa Fe, Los Angeles (Iro in Il ritorno d'Ulisse in patria), San Diego (the villainous Enoch Pratt in Carlisle Floyd's The Passion of Jonathan Wade), and Philadelphia (Prince Chouïsky in Boris Godunov, and Herodes in Salome).

Abroad, he has been seen at the Royal Opera House, the Netherlands Opera, Grand Théâtre de Genève (title role in Benvenuto Cellini), Frankfurt Opera, Opéra de Marseille (Mime in Siegfried) and the Canadian Opera Company.

Duykers most celebrated role has certainly been that of Mao Tse-tung (an extraordinarily testing part) in the 1987 world premiere of John Adams' Nixon in China, which was televised (winning an Emmy Award), and recorded (winning a Grammy Award). He was in the world premiere of O corvo branco (White Raven), by Robert Wilson and Philip Glass, in 1998; he has sung in Glass' Orphée (as Heurtebise) and the name part of Galileo Galilei. He appeared in San Francisco as the title (and sole) character in Erling Wold's Mordake, and as the Captain in the new chamber-orchestra version of Alban Berg's Wozzeck, and, for Long Beach Opera, reprising the role of Mao Tse-tung. Another of his successes has been in Sir Peter Maxwell Davies' Eight Songs for a Mad King.
