= Stitch Encounter =

Interactive show at four Disney parks

- Logo for the former Hong Kong version

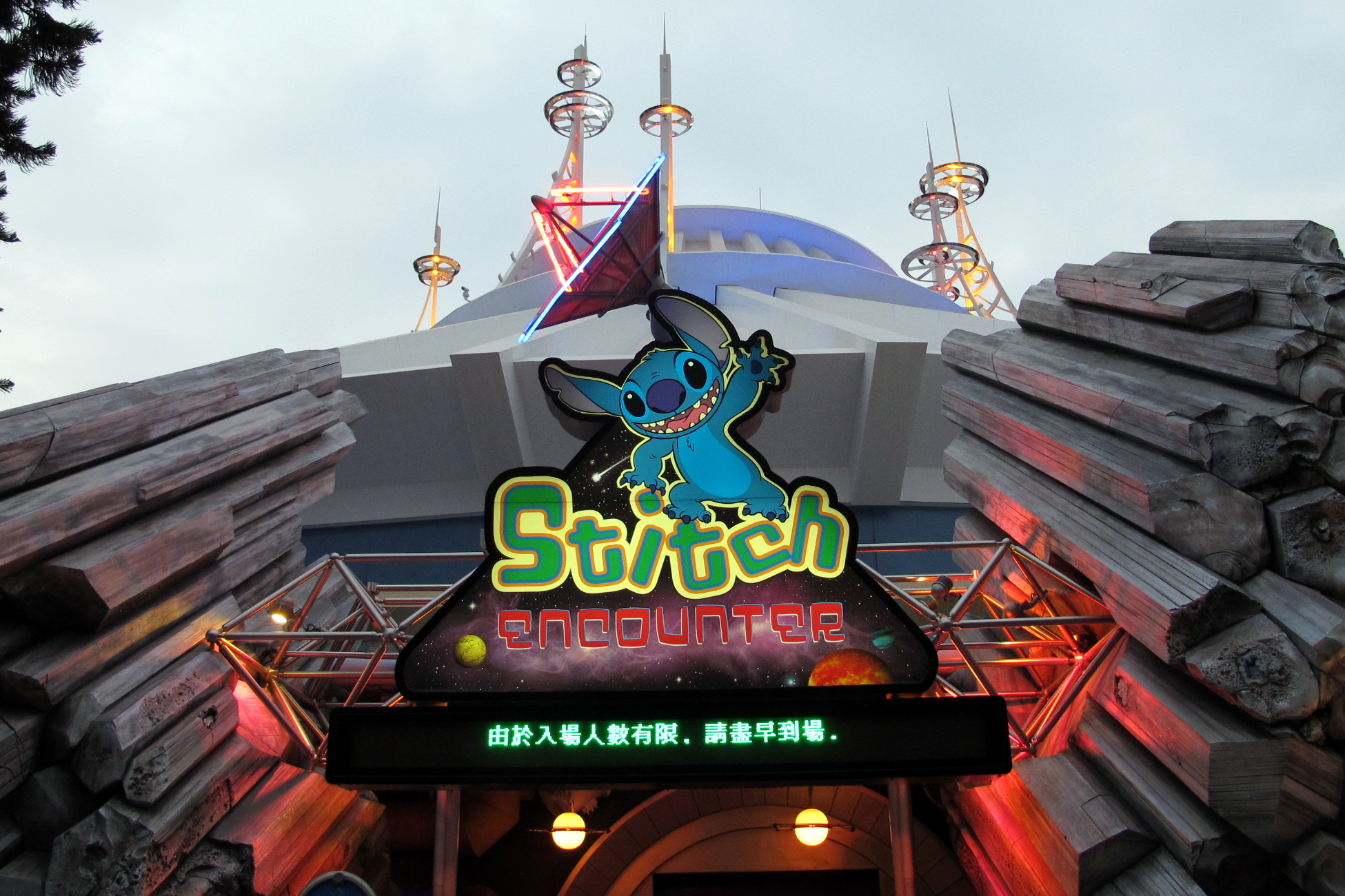
- Stitch Encounter at Tomorrowland in Hong Kong Disneyland

Hong Kong Disneyland
- Name: Stitch Encounter 幸會史迪仔
- Area: Tomorrowland (original version); The Pavilion (temporary event)
- Status: Removed
- Opening date: July 13, 2006 (original); June 15, 2019 (event)
- Closing date: May 2, 2016 (original); June 22, 2019 (event)
- Replaced by: Star Wars: Command Post (original)

Disney Adventure World
- Name: Stitch Live!
- Area: Studio D, Production Courtyard (2008–2025); Studio D, World Premiere Plaza
- Status: Operating
- Opening date: March 22, 2008
- Replaced: Walt Disney TV Tour: CyberSpace Mountain (Production Courtyard)

Tokyo Disneyland
- Name: Stitch Encounter スティッチ・エンカウンター (in Japanese)
- Area: Tomorrowland
- Status: Operating
- Opening date: July 17, 2015
- Replaced: Captain EO Tribute

Shanghai Disneyland Park
- Name: Space Chat with Stitch (Note: Formerly named Stitch Encounter (太空幸会史迪奇).)
- Area: Tomorrowland
- Status: Operating
- Soft opening date: May 7, 2016
- Opening date: June 16, 2016 (original); June 26, 2025 (Space Chat with Stitch)

Ride statistics
- Attraction type: Living Character show
- Designer: Walt Disney Imagineering
- Theme: Lilo & Stitch
- Hosted by: Stitch
- Sponsor: Daiwa House (Tokyo Disneyland)
- Related attraction: Stitch's Great Escape!
- Wheelchair accessible
- Assistive listening available

Stitch Encounter is an interactive show located in Disney Adventure World (under the name Stitch Live!), and in Tomorrowland at Tokyo Disneyland and Shanghai Disneyland Park (renamed to Space Chat with Stitch in 2025). The first edition of the show at Hong Kong Disneyland was closed on May 2, 2016, to make room for Star Wars: Command Post, although it temporarily returned to Hong Kong in 2019 for a limited time as a "Magic Access Members"-exclusive event.

Disney attractions similar to Stitch Encounter include Turtle Talk with Crush, located in Epcot at the Walt Disney World Resort, Disney California Adventure Park at the Disneyland Resort and in Tokyo DisneySea, as well as Monsters, Inc. Laugh Floor at the Magic Kingdom in Walt Disney World. Neither of the American Disney resorts have ever seen the release of this attraction, with Stitch's Great Escape! in Magic Kingdom having been the sole major Lilo & Stitch-themed attraction in the United States, although this attraction is based on an earlier exhibit called Stitch's Picture Phone featured in Disneyland's Innoventions according to the Disney A to Z database.

The attraction employs both real-time animation and digital puppetry. Stitch Encounter consists of an unscripted, real-time conversation between park guests and the animated character Stitch from Disney's Lilo & Stitch franchise. The attraction, which opened in July 2006, was part of a three-attraction expansion of Hong Kong’s Tomorrowland. It is located adjacent to the entrance of Space Mountain. The attraction offers shows in different languages depending on the locale: Cantonese, English, and Mandarin in the original Hong Kong version (Cantonese only for the 2019 event), French and English at Disneyland Paris, Japanese at Tokyo Disneyland, and Mandarin in Shanghai. Show times are available at the entrance of the attraction and each show has a length of approximately 15 minutes.

On July 1, 2021, following Disneyland Paris' reopening, Walt Disney Studios Park announced that the attraction is set to become part of Studio D.

== Attraction description ==
Guests are seated in a movie theater-like room, called the Space Traffic Control. Children are then encouraged to sit up front, on the floor, so that Stitch can see them during the show. At the start of the show, the host of the Space Traffic Control requests the computer to search for an available spacecraft captain to talk to; the computer connects to the spacecraft that Stitch is in. After that, guests (both children and adults) in the Space Traffic Control are randomly chosen by Stitch to interact with. Stitch can interact with guests in many ways such as chatting, singing them a song with his ukulele and even taking their pictures. Stitch looks, moves and sounds much like he does in the films and Lilo & Stitch: The Series, complete with corresponding facial expressions, gestures, and vocals (which the hidden actor performing him delivers in a mimicry of that used by the character's creator and original voice actor, Chris Sanders). At the conclusion of the show, the audience aids Stitch in his escape from Captain Gantu (Kevin Michael Richardson) who seems revenge on him for stealing his cruiser.

== See also ==
- Hong Kong Disneyland attraction and entertainment history
- Stitch's Great Escape!
- Turtle Talk with Crush
