= Production Courtyard =

Former area in Walt Disney Studios Park

Attractions
- Total: 4
- Other rides: 2
- Shows: 3

Walt Disney Studios Park
- Status: Defunct
- Opened: March 16, 2002
- Closed: May 14, 2025
- Replaced by: World Premiere Plaza

Production Courtyard is a formerly themed land at Walt Disney Studios Park in Disneyland Resort Paris. A large section of its original 2002 footprint is now cordoned off as part of the park's Hollywood Boulevard placemaking project, including the addition of The Twilight Zone Tower of Terror. It is expected this development will eventually encompass the whole of Production Courtyard with a full Hollywood theme.

One of the original attractions which opened with the park on 16 March 2002, Walt Disney Television Studios, was closed to become the Stitch Live! interactive CGI and the former attraction, Playhouse Disney Live on Stage shows.

In April 2024, it was announced that the Production Courtyard and Toon Studio will be closed, and new 'Themed-lands' in World Premiere Plaza will open in May 15, 2025.

== Former Attractions and entertainment ==
=== Hollywood Boulevard ===
- The Twilight Zone Tower of Terror (as redesigned to "World Premiere Plaza")

=== Place des Stars ===
- Walt Disney Television Studios (2009–2019)
  - Disney Junior – Live on Stage! (2009–2019)
- Studio D (as redesigned to "World Premiere Plaza")
  - Stitch Live! (as redesigned to "World Premiere Plaza")
  - Disney Jr. Dream Factory (2021–2024)
  - Minnie's Musical Moment (2024–2025)
- Studio Theater (as redesigned to "World Premiere Plaza")
  - CinéMagique (2002–2017)
  - Marvel Super Heroes: United (seasonal, 2018–2020)
  - Together: a Pixar Musical Adventure (as redesigned to "World Premiere Plaza")
- Theater of the Stars (as redesigned to "World Premiere Plaza")
  - Alice & the Queen of Hearts: Back to Wonderland (2024) (Returning on 17 May, 2025) (as redesigned to "World Premiere Plaza")
- Star Wars: A Galactic Celebration (2017-2020)
- Star Wars - A Galaxy Far, Far Away
- Studio Tram Tour: Behind the Magic (2002-2020)
- Stark Expo: Make Way for a Better Tomorrow (seasonal, 2018-2020)
- Magic Over Disney (2022–2023)

== Former Restaurants ==
- La Terrasse (as redesigned to "World Premiere Plaza")
- Hollywood & Lime (as redesigned to "World Premiere Plaza")
- Speciality Ice Cream (as redesigned to "World Premiere Plaza")
- Kool Zone (as redesigned to "World Premiere Plaza")
- Studio Catering Co. (as renamed in "World Premiere Plaza Catering Co.")
- Café Café
- Restaurant des Stars

== Former Shops ==
- Tower Hotel Gifts (as redesigned to "World Premiere Plaza")
- Television Studios Kiosk (as redesigned to "World Premiere Plaza")
- Pin Trading Station (as redesigned to "World Premiere Plaza")
