= Hollywood Boulevard (Walt Disney Studios Park) =

"Studio lot"

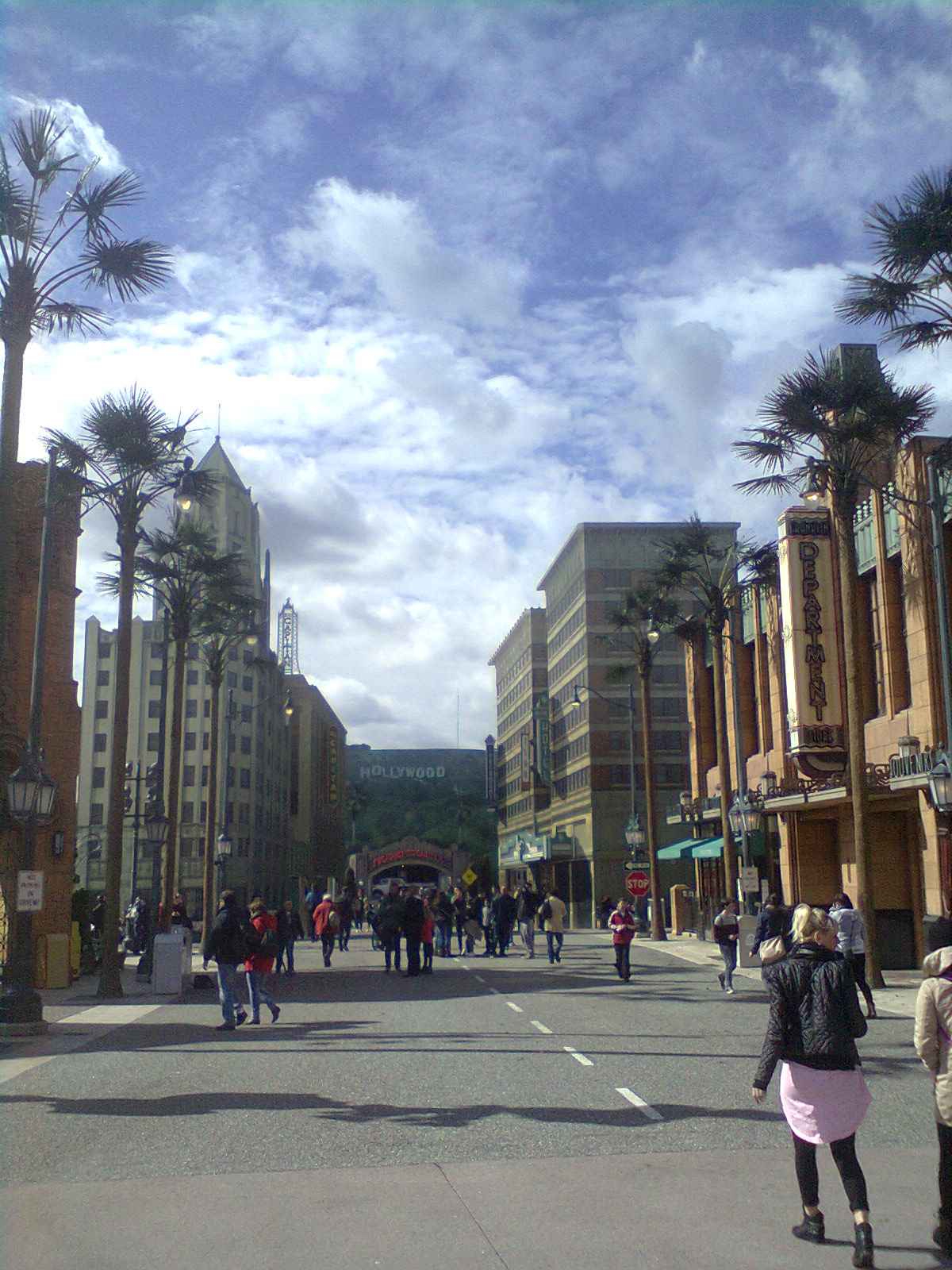
Disney Studios Park

Hollywood Boulevard is a themed land at Disney Adventure World in Disneyland Resort Paris. Designed by Walt Disney Imagineering, the project falls under their "placemaking" banner of park improvements and expansions, adding theme and time zones to existing park areas. Hollywood Boulevard uses land formerly classified as part of Production Courtyard for a new development of "street sets", an outdoor food court and a major new attraction. The project was formally announced to the press on 1 April 2007, including the preview of one piece of "concept art", for an initial, unused vision of the Boulevard.

== Development ==
=== Phase 1 ===
The first phase of the project was completed in late 2007, and included the park's major new attraction - The Twilight Zone Tower of Terror - surrounded by a series of "movie set" facades and storefronts to give the impression of a 1940s Hollywood Boulevard.

Notable inspirations for these sets came from Disney's existing Hollywood Boulevard areas in Disney's Hollywood Studios in Florida and Disney California Adventure Park in California. However, the original designs were changed and altered considerably, and this edition includes two brand new locations - the First National Bank and Broadway Building department store.

=== Phase 2 ===
It is expected that, should this development and The Twilight Zone Tower of Terror be a success, the rest of the park's Production Courtyard will undergo a similar makeover - the entire area then becoming known as Hollywood Studio to match Toon Studio nearby.
