= Roman Prošek =

Czech ice hockey player

- Born: August 2, 1980 (age 45) Karlovy Vary, Czechoslovakia
- Height: 5 ft 11 in (180 cm)
- Weight: 181 lb (82 kg; 12 st 13 lb)
- Position: Defence
- Shot: Left
- Played for: HC Baník Sokolov; HC Karlovy Vary; SK Kadaň; HC Prostějov; HC Berounští Medvědi; HC Mladá Boleslav; HC Znojemští Orli; HC Olomouc; KLH Chomutov; Lillehammer IK; HC Hradec Králové; HC Most
- Playing career: 1997–2015

Roman Prošek (born August 2, 1980) is a Czech professional ice hockey defenceman. He played with HC Karlovy Vary in the Czech Extraliga during the 2010–11 Czech Extraliga season.

== Career statistics ==
| | | | Regular season | | | | | Playoffs |
| Season | Team | League | GP | G | A | Pts | PIM | GP | G | A | Pts | PIM |
|---|---|---|---|---|---|---|---|---|---|---|---|---|
| 1996–97 | HC Karlovy Vary U18 | Czech U18 2 | 36 | 15 | 19 | 34 | — | — | — | — | — | — |
| 1997–98 | HC Baník Sokolov U20 | Czech U20 2 | 29 | 6 | 4 | 10 | — | — | — | — | — | — |
| 1997–98 | HC Baník Sokolov | Czech3 | — | — | — | — | — | — | — | — | — | — |
| 1998–99 | HC Energie Karlovy Vary U20 | Czech U20 | 45 | 2 | 17 | 19 | — | — | — | — | — | — |
| 1998–99 | HC Karlovy Vary | Czech | 9 | 0 | 0 | 0 | 0 | — | — | — | — | — |
| 1999–00 | HC Karlovy Vary U20 | Czech U20 | 15 | 0 | 8 | 8 | 16 | 2 | 0 | 0 | 0 | 2 |
| 1999–00 | HC Karlovy Vary | Czech | 34 | 1 | 1 | 2 | 22 | — | — | — | — | — |
| 1999–00 | SK Kadaň | Czech2 | 9 | 0 | 1 | 1 | 6 | — | — | — | — | — |
| 2000–01 | HC Karlovy Vary U20 | Czech U20 | 3 | 0 | 0 | 0 | 4 | — | — | — | — | — |
| 2000–01 | HC Karlovy Vary | Czech | 37 | 2 | 7 | 9 | 22 | — | — | — | — | — |
| 2000–01 | HC Prostějov | Czech2 | 6 | 0 | 0 | 0 | 4 | 4 | 1 | 0 | 1 | 4 |
| 2000–01 | HC Berounští Medvědi | Czech2 | 1 | 0 | 0 | 0 | 0 | — | — | — | — | — |
| 2001–02 | HC Karlovy Vary | Czech | 7 | 0 | 0 | 0 | 6 | — | — | — | — | — |
| 2001–02 | HC Baník Sokolov | Czech3 | 7 | 0 | 0 | 0 | 8 | — | — | — | — | — |
| 2002–03 | HC Energie Karlovy Vary | Czech | 5 | 0 | 1 | 1 | 0 | — | — | — | — | — |
| 2002–03 | HC Mladá Boleslav | Czech2 | 31 | 3 | 2 | 5 | 18 | 3 | 0 | 0 | 0 | 0 |
| 2003–04 | HC Znojemští Orli | Czech | 2 | 0 | 0 | 0 | 0 | — | — | — | — | — |
| 2003–04 | HC Olomouc | Czech2 | 35 | 2 | 2 | 4 | 36 | 5 | 0 | 0 | 0 | 14 |
| 2004–05 | KLH Chomutov | Czech2 | 46 | 5 | 15 | 20 | 52 | 7 | 0 | 0 | 0 | 14 |
| 2005–06 | Lillehammer IK | Norway | 42 | 7 | 15 | 22 | 82 | — | — | — | — | — |
| 2006–07 | Lillehammer IK | Norway | 17 | 0 | 4 | 4 | 28 | — | — | — | — | — |
| 2006–07 | HC Hradec Králové | Czech2 | 28 | 3 | 7 | 10 | 42 | 8 | 1 | 4 | 5 | 8 |
| 2007–08 | HC Energie Karlovy Vary | Czech | 24 | 1 | 3 | 4 | 12 | 19 | 1 | 1 | 2 | 43 |
| 2007–08 | HC Most | Czech2 | 24 | 4 | 6 | 10 | 32 | — | — | — | — | — |
| 2008–09 | HC Energie Karlovy Vary | Czech | 46 | 3 | 5 | 8 | 36 | 16 | 1 | 1 | 2 | 24 |
| 2008–09 | HC Most | Czech2 | 8 | 1 | 1 | 2 | 6 | — | — | — | — | — |
| 2009–10 | HC Energie Karlovy Vary | Czech | 29 | 0 | 1 | 1 | 24 | — | — | — | — | — |
| 2009–10 | SK Kadaň | Czech2 | 6 | 2 | 2 | 4 | 2 | — | — | — | — | — |
| 2010–11 | HC Energie Karlovy Vary | Czech | 32 | 0 | 0 | 0 | 30 | 5 | 0 | 1 | 1 | 0 |
| 2010–11 | KLH Chomutov | Czech2 | 13 | 1 | 1 | 2 | 6 | — | — | — | — | — |
| 2011–12 | HC Energie Karlovy Vary | Czech | 33 | 2 | 3 | 5 | 14 | — | — | — | — | — |
| 2011–12 | HC Most | Czech2 | 8 | 0 | 6 | 6 | 4 | — | — | — | — | — |
| 2012–13 | HC Energie Karlovy Vary | Czech | 27 | 0 | 3 | 3 | 14 | — | — | — | — | — |
| 2012–13 | HC Most | Czech2 | 11 | 1 | 3 | 4 | 8 | — | — | — | — | — |
| 2012–13 | SK Kadaň | Czech2 | 16 | 1 | 9 | 10 | 4 | — | — | — | — | — |
| 2013–14 | Piráti Chomutov | Czech | 8 | 0 | 0 | 0 | 2 | — | — | — | — | — |
| 2013–14 | SK Kadaň | Czech2 | 24 | 1 | 4 | 5 | 20 | — | — | — | — | — |
| 2014–15 | HC Baník Sokolov | Czech3 | 10 | 1 | 6 | 7 | 14 | — | — | — | — | — |
| Czech totals | | | 293 | 9 | 24 | 33 | 182 | 40 | 2 | 3 | 5 | 67 |
| Czech2 totals | | | 266 | 24 | 59 | 83 | 240 | 27 | 2 | 4 | 6 | 40 |
