= The Twilight Zone Tower of Terror =

Drop tower dark ride at Disney parks

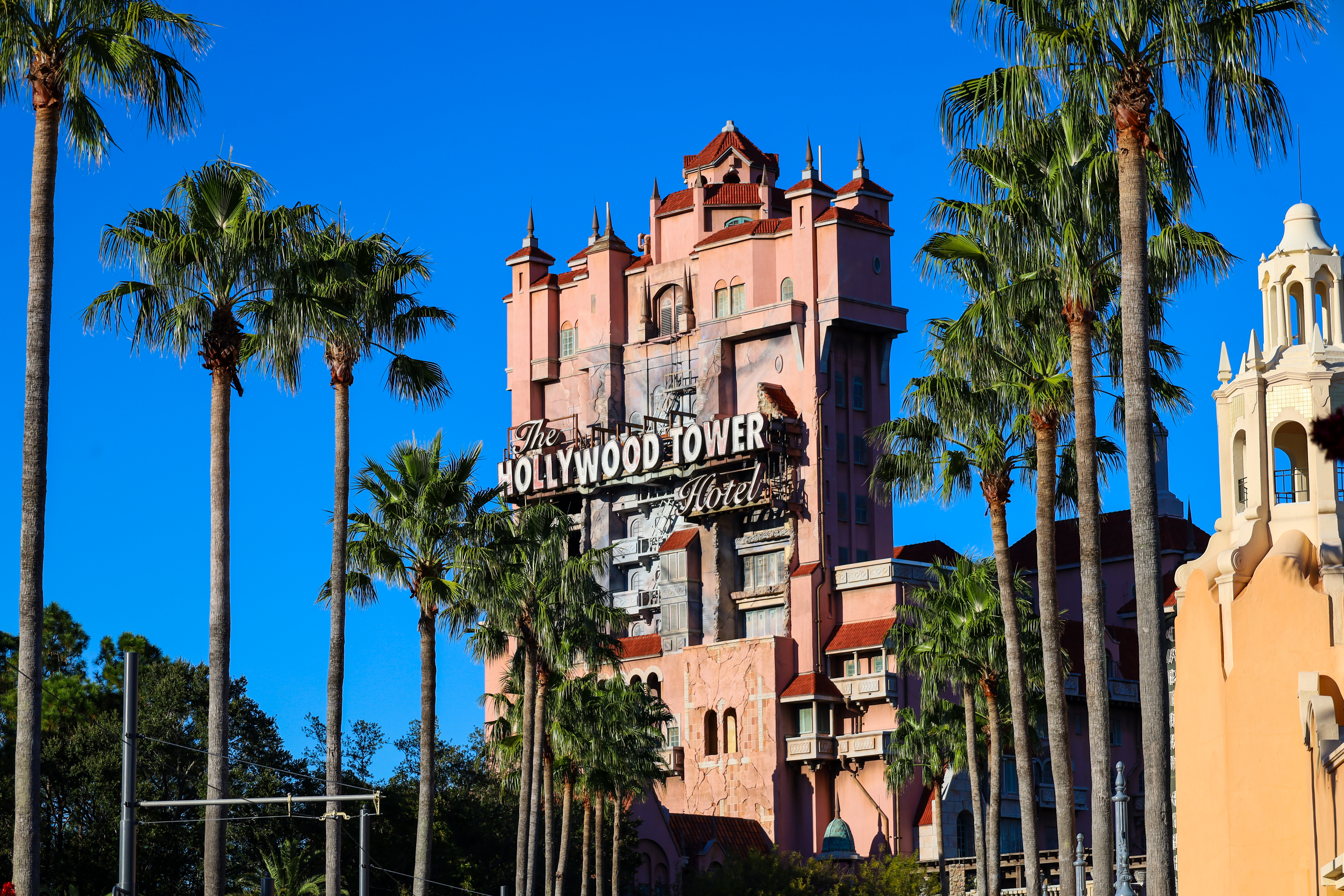
- The Twilight Zone Tower of Terror at Disney's Hollywood Studios

Disney's Hollywood Studios
- Area: Sunset Boulevard
- Coordinates: 28°21′36.2″N 81°33′35.4″W
- Status: Operating
- Cost: US$150 million
- Opening date: July 22, 1994; 32 years ago
- Lightning Lane available

Disney California Adventure
- Area: Hollywood Land
- Coordinates: 33.8065479°N 117.9174805°W
- Status: Closed
- Opening date: May 5, 2004
- Closing date: January 3, 2017
- Replaced by: Guardians of the Galaxy – Mission: Breakout! (Avengers Campus)

Disney Adventure World
- Name: The Twilight Zone Tower of Terror - A New Dimension of Chills (2019–present)
- Area: Production Courtyard (2007–2025); World Premiere Plaza (2025–present)
- Coordinates: 48.8666589°N 2.7768075°E
- Status: Operating
- Opening date: December 22, 2007; 18 years ago
- Disney Premier Access available

Ride statistics
- Attraction type: Drop tower dark ride, haunted attraction
- Manufacturer: Otis Elevator Company
- Designer: Walt Disney Imagineering
- Theme: The Twilight Zone
- Music: "The Twilight Zone Theme" by Marius Constant; Richard Bellis
- Height: 199 ft (61 m)
- Drop: 130 ft (40 m)
- Speed: 39 mph (63 km/h)
- G-force: 1.3
- Vehicle type: Automated guided vehicle (Florida); Elevator (California, Paris)
- Vehicles: 8 (Florida) (Note: The Florida version has a total of ten vehicles, eight during operation and two for backup.); 6 (California, Paris)
- Riders per vehicle: 21
- Rows: 3
- Riders per row: 7
- Duration: 3:34
- Height restriction: 40 in (102 cm)
- Pre-show host: Rod Serling (voiced by Mark Silverman)
- Ride host: Rod Serling
- Must transfer from wheelchair
- Closed captioning available

The Twilight Zone Tower of Terror, or simply Tower of Terror, is a series of similar accelerated drop tower dark rides located at Disney's Hollywood Studios, Disney Adventure World, and formerly located at Disney California Adventure. The attraction is inspired by Rod Serling's anthology television series, The Twilight Zone, and takes place in the fictional Hollywood Tower Hotel in Hollywood, California. A similar drop tower, known simply as Tower of Terror, is located at Tokyo DisneySea and features an original storyline set in the fictional Hotel Hightower, unrelated to The Twilight Zone. All versions of the attraction place riders in a seemingly ordinary hotel elevator, and present a fictional backstory in which people have mysteriously disappeared from the elevator under the influence of a supernatural element many years previously.

The original version of the attraction opened at Disney's Hollywood Studios, then named Disney-MGM Studios, at Walt Disney World in July 1994. At the time of its debut, it was Disney’s most expensive theme park attraction ever built, at an estimated cost of $150 million. A decade later, Disney began plans to add similar versions of the attraction to their newest parks at the Disneyland Resort in Anaheim, California, Tokyo Disney Resort in Japan, and Disneyland Paris. In Anaheim and Paris, Disney sought to use the popular attraction to boost attendance at the respective resorts' struggling new theme parks. The Anaheim and Tokyo versions of Tower of Terror opened in 2004 and 2006, respectively, while financial problems delayed the opening of the Paris version until 2007. The California version closed in January 2017 and was replaced by Guardians of the Galaxy – Mission: Breakout!, which was later incorporated into the adjacent Avengers Campus in 2021.

The Tower of Terror buildings are among the tallest structures found at their respective Disney resorts. At 199 feet (60.7 m), the Florida version is the second tallest attraction at the Walt Disney World Resort, with only Expedition Everest at Disney's Animal Kingdom being taller by 0.5 feet (0.2 m). After its retheme, the 183-foot (55.8 m) structure at the Disneyland Resort is still the tallest building on the property, as well as one of the tallest buildings in Anaheim. At Disneyland Paris, it is the second tallest attraction.

== History ==
=== Development ===
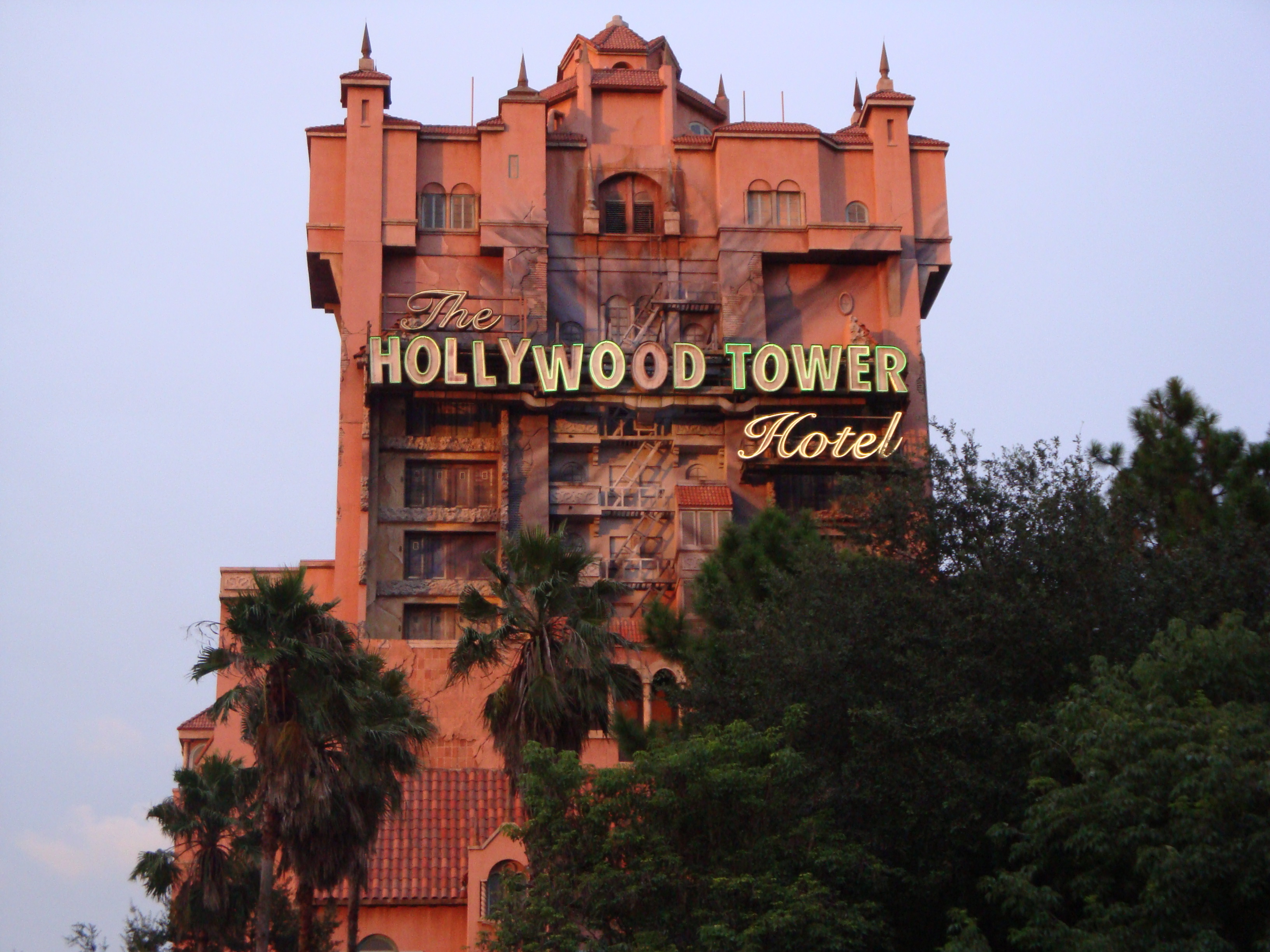
The original Tower of Terror at Disney's Hollywood Studios

In the late 1980s, a second phase of development was being designed for Disneyland Paris, then known as Euro Disney. Included was a free-fall type ride in Frontierland that was to be named Geyser Mountain. It would have been part roller coaster and part free-fall ride that shot guests up a vertical shaft. The plan was scrapped, but was picked up by Disney's Hollywood Studios, then named Disney-MGM Studios, as part of a massive expansion to their U.S. park. Several attractions had already been proposed, including "Dick Tracy's Crimestoppers", which was later made into Indiana Jones Adventure at Disneyland. Still needing a major "E-ticket" attraction, the idea of a drop-shaft ride came up and was chosen.

There had been several proposed ideas for haunted attractions, including a ride based on Stephen King's novels, a Vincent Price ghost tour, a Mel Brooks-narrated ride, a real hotel, an awards show honoring classic movie monsters starring Godzilla hosted by Eddie Murphy and Elvira, and a whodunit murder mystery, but none progressed into development.

Walt Disney Imagineering eventually took inspiration from Rod Serling's anthology stories featured in The Twilight Zone, as a foundation for the attraction's original story. Imagineers mused that the attraction would be able to take guests into the Fifth Dimension that Serling always described as unlocking in every episode of the series. With the project in firm development, Disney licensed the rights to use the Twilight Zone intellectual property from CBS. (Note: Today, CBS is a subsidiary of the CBS Entertainment Group division of Skydance.) The Imagineering team settled on a 1930s-era Hollywood hotel with a Twilight Zone theme, but a new ride system had to be built, which would allow both more capacity inside the ride and make the drop fast. Otis Elevator Company was tasked to create the vertical ride system, while Eaton-Kenway developed a ride vehicle that could drive itself horizontally. Joe Dante directed the ride's preshow film.

Disney felt Rod Serling needed to be part of the attraction, although he had died almost two decades earlier. In order to include Serling in the attraction, Disney opted to hold auditions to cast his voice, with Carol Serling, Rod's widow, serving as a consultant for the casting. After many auditions, Mark Silverman was chosen by Carol to provide her late husband's voice. The archival footage of Serling used in the preshow was taken from the episode, "It's a Good Life". Silverman would later reprise this voice role for additional lines for the Disney California Adventure attraction and marketing promotions. He also reprised the voice of Serling for the first-season finale of the 2019 revival of The Twilight Zone. The child actor in the ride's pre-show and ride experience is voiced by Kat Cressida, who also voices Constance Hatchaway in The Haunted Mansion.

The new ride was announced on September 30, 1991, and it was later described as a haunted attraction with a "stomach-churning 130-foot drop" for its finale, a contrasting experience to the friendlier Haunted Mansion attraction at Magic Kingdom. Site-clearing and preparation began in early 1992, and the original location was moved slightly after a sinkhole formed. The tower's interior and exterior design took inspiration from existing Southern California landmarks, including the Biltmore Hotel and Mission Inn.

Influenced by Spanish Colonial Revival, Mission Revivial, and Mediterranean Revival architecture, the tower's distinctive architectural features that are present on and around the attraction's roof were designed so that the rear facade would blend with the skyline of the Morocco Pavilion at Epcot, which is located less than two miles from Disney's Hollywood Studios. After construction ended, the ride was initially set to open on July 4, 1994. However, the Tower of Terror opened on July 22, 1994, along with the Sunset Boulevard section of Disney's Hollywood Studios.

=== Engineering ===
The ride system employs specialized technology developed by Walt Disney Imagineering, particularly the ability to move the vehicle in and out of the vertical motion shaft. The elevator cabs are self-propelled automated guided vehicles, which lock into separate vertical motion cabs. The cabs can move into and out of elevators horizontally, move through the "Fifth Dimension" scene, and on to the drop shaft. The Florida ride runs on a unique loop system, with two identical ride systems built within the Tower. There are four shafts in the back section of the building containing the dark-ride portion of the attraction.

After the corridor scene, the four shafts merge into two, identical "Fifth Dimension" scenes, and then a cab enters the single drop shaft. After the drop sequence, the elevators unload in the building's basement, then return to one of the show shafts to re-load the next guests. The Twilight Zone Tower of Terror initially featured a single drop until May 1996, when the ride was upgraded with a second one. A third drop was added in 1999. In January 2003, the attraction's triple drop was replaced with randomized multi-drop sequences selected by a computer within the ride.

In order to achieve the weightless effect the Imagineers desired, cables attached to the bottom of the elevator car pull it down at a speed slightly faster than what a free fall would provide. Two enormous motors are located at the top of the tower, measuring 12 feet (3.7 m) tall, 35 feet (11 m) long, and weighing 132,000 pounds (60,000 kg). They are able to accelerate 10 short tons (9.1 t) at 15 times the speed of normal elevators. They generate 275 times the torque of a Chevrolet Corvette engine, reaching top speed in 1.5 seconds.

The ride's slogan, "Never the Same Fear Twice!", refers to the drop pattern being randomly selected by a computer before the ride begins. The drop reaches a top speed of 39 miles per hour (63 km/h). Initially, the attraction's vehicles seated 22 guests, restrained by lap bars; in 2002, the vehicles each had a seat removed from the back row and lap bars were replaced by seatbelt restraints. The vehicles for Tokyo's Tower of Terror still accommodate 22 guests, 7 in the first two rows and 8 in the third.

The design of the 199 ft (60.7 m) tall Tower of Terror was founded on advanced dynamic analysis to model the effects of moving parts on the structural and non-structural elements. Since the facility was intended to provide new and non-repeatable sensations to visitors, a very wide variety of elevator drops and sequences of downward and upward motions, spanning anywhere from 1 floor to 13 floors, were modeled. Each elevator drop mode was analyzed as a time history - in other words accelerations that change in time - applied to the entire structural system.

The objective was to push the motion beyond a free fall and provide the thrill to riders while ensuring structural integrity and safety. In addition to the self-weight of the structure, when motors weighing 270 kilo-pounds (123 metric tons) move, the force they exert on the structure is amplified by an order of magnitude. The applied accelerations were tested in the model over a range of 1.0 g (32.2 feet/s/s or 9.81 m/s/s) to 2.5 g (80.5 feet/s/s or 24.5 m/s/s). In addition to strength requirements, the design applied very stringent deflection criteria. In the case of the tower, floors have to support cabs while in horizontal motion in and out of the elevators with minimal deflections to avoid blurry projection screens.

In August 2014, video recording was added to the ride's on-ride camera, included with the on-ride photo through Disney PhotoPass. This was the first ride at Walt Disney World to offer on-ride videos. In September 2014, on-ride videos were added to Seven Dwarfs Mine Train at Magic Kingdom and TRON Lightcycle / Run when it opened in April 2023. making it the only three attractions in Walt Disney World to offer both in-ride photos and videos.

== Disney's Hollywood Studios version ==
=== Queue and preshow ===
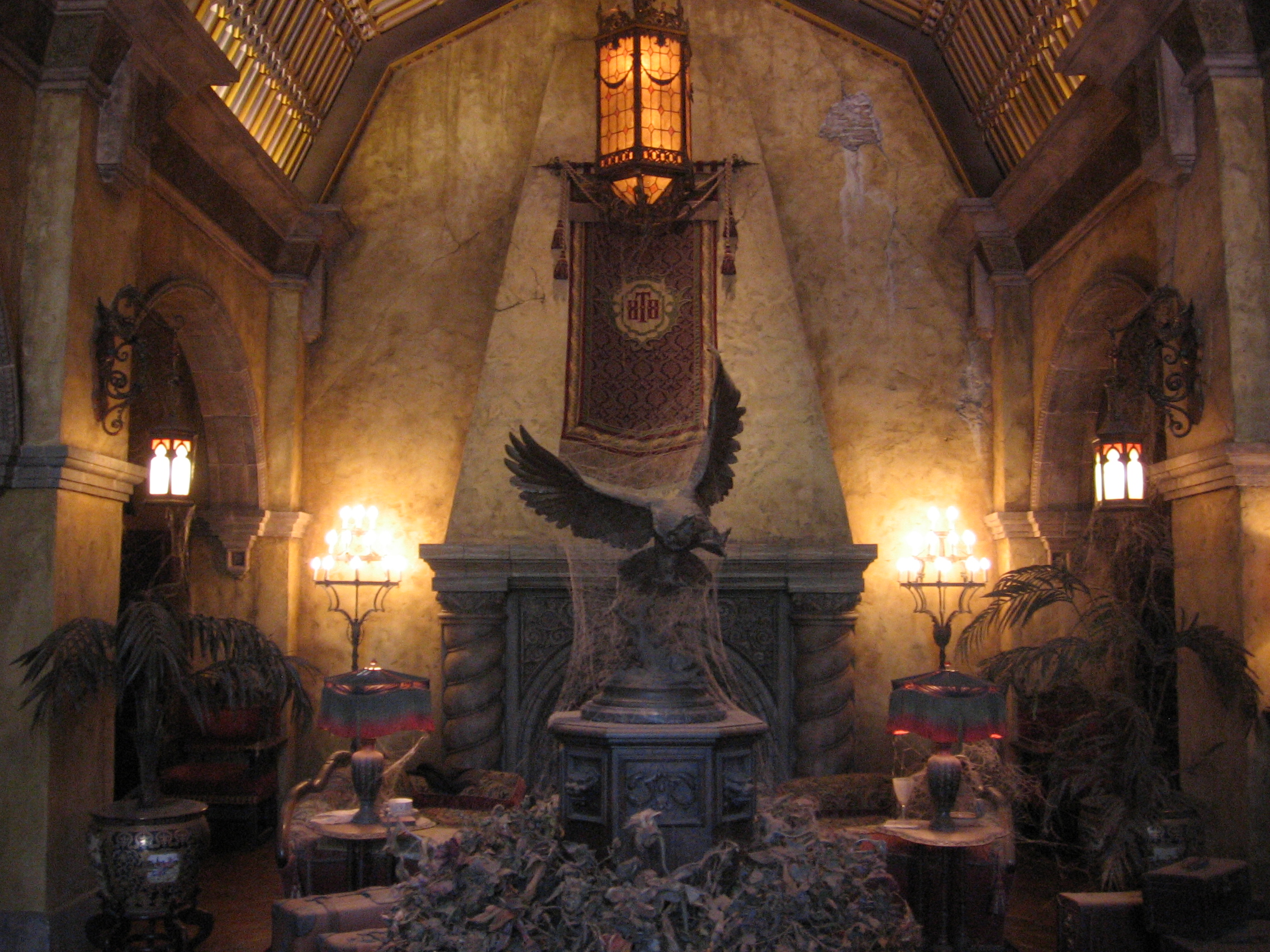
The lobby of the Hollywood Tower Hotel at Disney's Hollywood Studios, May 2010

In the American and European versions of the attraction, guests make their way to the dilapidated Hollywood Tower Hotel through the front gate to enter the queue through overgrown gardens and then enter the hotel lobby. Once in the lobby, guests are ushered to the hotel library, which houses the hotel's collection of books and antiques. With a crash of thunder and lightning, the power in the library goes out, except for a television set which crackles into life and plays the opening sequence from the fourth and fifth seasons of The Twilight Zone, hosted by Rod Serling.

The episode depicts the events of a stormy night in Hollywood 1939, where a powerful lightning bolt strikes the hotel and causes five people—an actor, a singer, a child star, her nanny, and a hotel bellhop—to vanish from the elevator, along with an entire wing of the building. Serling then tells guests that they'll be stepping in a maintenance service elevator to become the stars of an episode of The Twilight Zone. The television then turns off and then guests are directed through to the boiler room to board the elevator.

=== Ride experience ===
After guests are loaded into the elevator, the doors close, the lights dim and the elevator starts to ascend. Serling's voice greets passengers to "a most uncommon elevator about to ascend into their very own episode of The Twilight Zone". The elevator stops its ascent and the doors open to reveal a dimly-lit hotel corridor, with a single window at the end. The ghosts of the five missing passengers appear, causing a faint purple light, and ghostly wind. The ghosts beckon the guests to join them before disappearing in a burst of electricity that scatters throughout the corridor. The corridor lights dim, and the entire room fades to darkness, transforming into a field of stars. The window floats forward and morphs into the window from the Season 5 opening sequence, and breaks.

The elevator doors close and the car continues its ascent, once more, opening its doors to a maintenance room. The elevator car exits from the lift shaft horizontally into the room, which slowly fades into darkness as it turns into The Fifth Dimension, an element frequently referred by Serling in The Twilight Zone. Now, in total darkness, the car reaches a field of stars which splits open and the elevator enters a pitch-black vertical shaft.

As Serling's narration ends the elevator begins the drop sequence at a top speed of 39 miles per hour (63 km/h). At least once during the drop sequence, wide elevator doors in front of the riders open to reveal a view of the park, where the on-ride camera captures the in-ride photograph and video. One of four randomized profiles of drops and lifts are selected by a computer, where the ride vehicle drops or rises various lengths at different intervals. Some effects include projected images of the breaking window, wind effects, lightning flashes, and ominous blue-lit figures of the five ghostly original riders.

Once the elevator finishes its sequence, the car backs up into the hotel basement. A short clip plays, showing elements from the Season 5 opening sequence, along with the 1939 elevator passengers and Serling falling into the "vortex" seen in the Season 3 opening sequence. As Serling welcomes back the guests and sends them off after their "visit" to the hotel, warning them they'll be "a permanent resident of The Twilight Zone" if they are not careful, the car rotates and parks itself at the exit doors that lead to the unload area.

Guests exit the elevator, leaving the hotel through the gift shop. After leaving the elevator, guests are led through a hotel corridor towards an old "Lost & Found" desk of the hotel, converted to display the on-ride photographs, serviced by Disney PhotoPass. Guests can use their MagicBands to link the photograph and video to their My Disney Experience account via the RFID touchpoints.

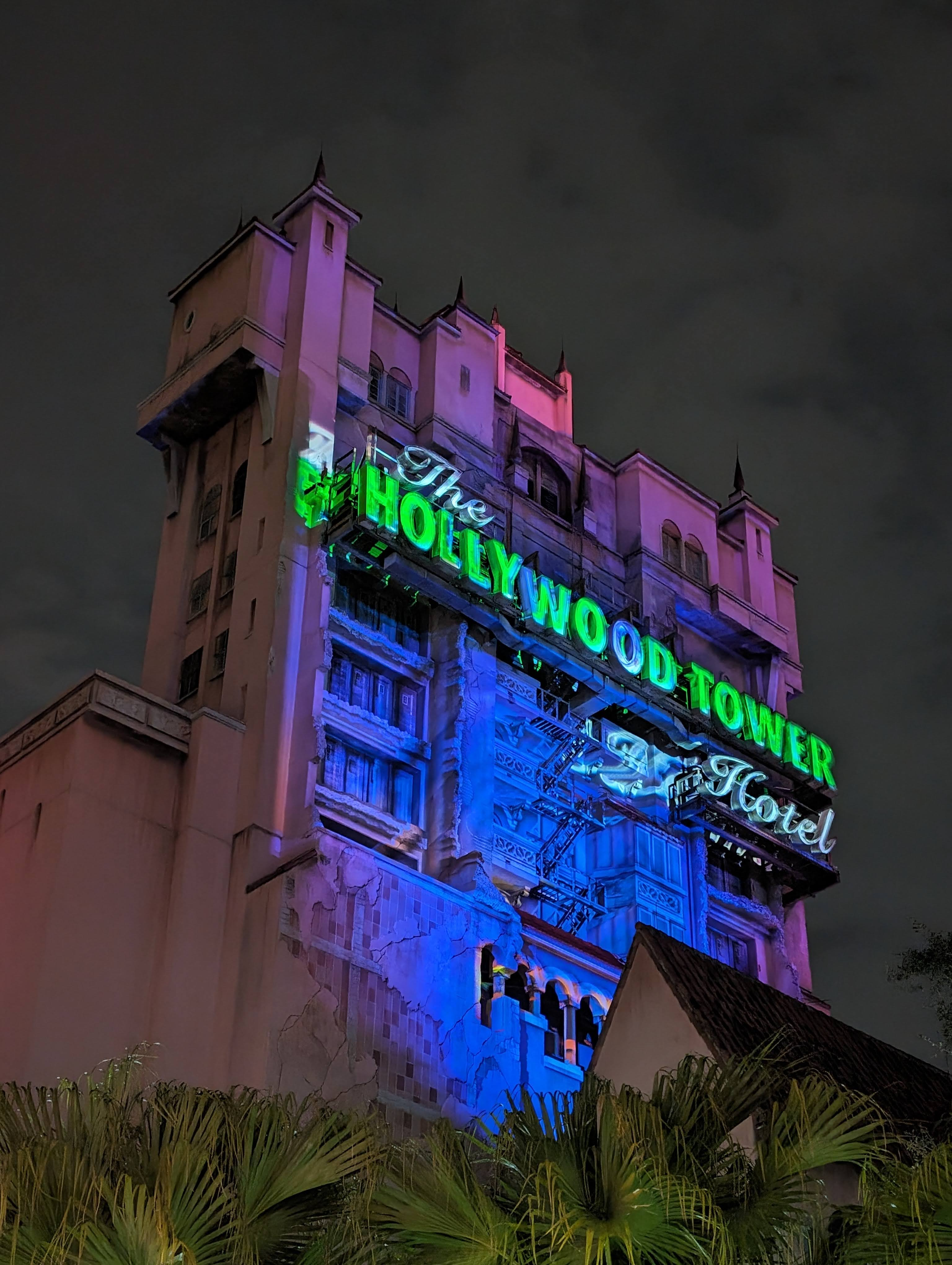
Hollywood Studios' The Twilight Zone Tower of Terror at night, December 2023.

=== Summer Nightastic! ===
In February 2010, Disney announced that the Tower of Terror would receive "new lighting effects and a new addition" as part of a summer entertainment package called "Summer Nightastic!". The Fifth Dimension scene was mostly covered by black tarps with fiber-optic stars, and Serling's voice was removed from just before the drop profile. Replacing it is music played in the drop shaft, along with a projected photograph of the riders just before they enter the drop shaft. Similar to the Anaheim and Paris versions of the ride, the riders disappear, leaving an empty elevator.

A new drop profile was created for "Summer Nightastic!", and replaced the other drop profiles on all rides. After the music played, three sudden, distorted bell rings were heard, which began the drop profile. The profile mainly consisted of utilizing the entire tower for the drop sequences, as compared to the numerous faux and shortened drops in the randomized version. The changes were implemented on June 5, 2010, but were officially introduced the day after. All changes were temporary, and lasted until August 14, 2010.

=== Disney's Jollywood Nights ===
In November 2023, Disney's Hollywood Studios announced that a new show, Twilight Soirée at The Tip-Top Club would take place in the Courtyard of the Hollywood Tower Hotel, near the ride's exit, as part of Disney's Jollywood Nights.

== Disney California Adventure and Disney Adventure World versions ==
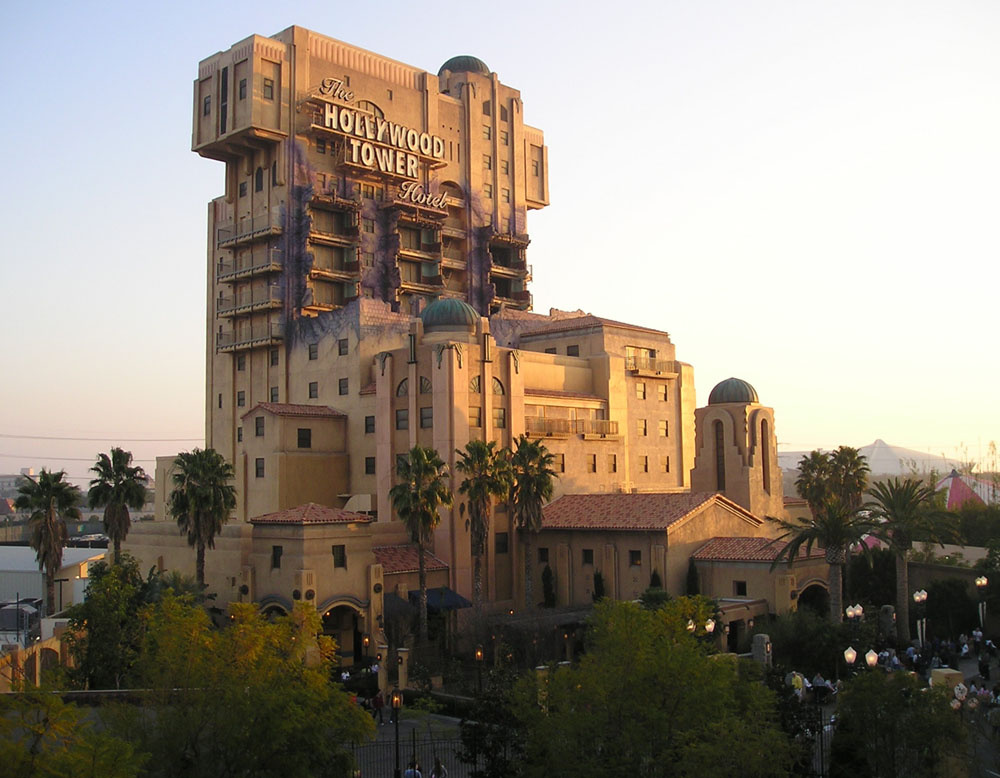
The Tower of Terror as it appeared at Disney California Adventure.

While similar in concept and theme to the original attraction in Florida, the version of Tower of Terror at Disney California Adventure, which opened in 2004 and closed in 2017, and its sister attraction at Disney Adventure World (formerly known as Walt Disney Studios Park) which opened in 2007, feature some significant differences. The exterior of these rides use architectural features reminiscent of Pueblo Deco styles found throughout Southern California during the Golden Age of Hollywood. The designs for this version were originally designed for the Paris park. However, when California Adventure was in need of an additional crowd-puller, the Paris version's plans were used for its version. When financial troubles hit Disney's Parisian resort, the attraction had to be put on hold.

The Paris version of the ride was green-lit in 2005 and was under construction in the center of the park, behind the La Terrasse seating area, by early 2006. Upon completion, it was joined by a new Hollywood Boulevard lined by faux movie sets. The attraction opened in 2007 and, unlike the American versions, it was constructed using concrete rather than steel due to French construction guidelines and standards, at a total cost exceeding €180 million.

The Paris and Anaheim versions were originally intended to be almost identical upon completion, but there are differences, notably the height of the building and the location of some rooms backstage, as well as other differences due to different construction and work regulations in France. In Paris, the default language for the pre-show library video and the ride is French, but can be changed to English by the Cast Member upon request.

The library video is the same as the American version, but is dubbed in French and subtitled in English. These versions have a slightly different queue area. The boiler room scene in the queue area has two floors, instead of the one floor in the original Florida version. The two floors allow for one elevator in one shaft to have guests on the ride, while the other elevator of the same shaft was loading guests. There are three elevator shafts, with two elevators per shaft, for a total of six ride vehicles operating.

=== New ride operation system ===
Imagineers redesigned the ride system for the attraction in Anaheim and Paris and made some changes to the show scenes. Instead of the autonomous vehicle found in the original incarnation, the new ride system limits the elevator car to a single shaft, three shafts in total in the newer versions. Each shaft was its own separate ride with its own separate operating system. This makes it easier to repair individual areas of the attraction without causing the entire attraction to go down. Each shaft has the capacity to accommodate two vehicles operating from two load levels, each vehicle loading and unloading at the same point. The ride was designed so that one vehicle can be in its ride profile while the other is at its loading level, giving each ride shaft the ability to accommodate more riders. Disney used this ride system again for Tokyo DisneySea's Hotel Hightower.

=== Ride experience ===
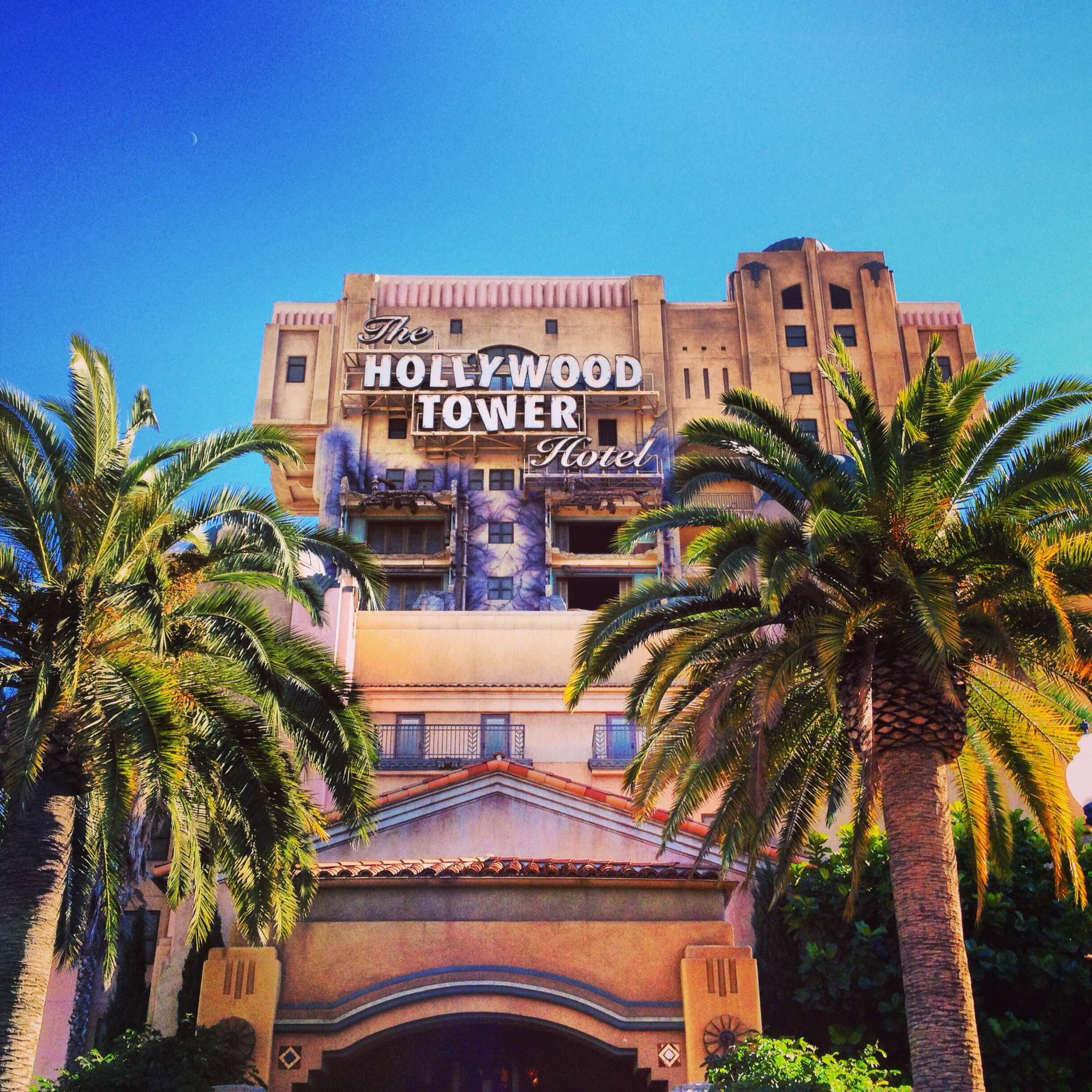
The attraction at Disney California Adventure. Unlike the original Florida tower, this version featured three drop shafts.

==== Anaheim (2004–2017) and Paris (2007–2019) ====
As the elevator doors close, the lights of the service elevator flicker out. The elevator itself is pushed into the shaftway by a mechanical arm in front of the doors. With a flash of lightning, the walls of the basement disappear altogether, leaving only a star field around the service doors with a rotating purple spiral. The elevator rises quickly, arriving at a floor with large ornate mirror, and a door leading to a different section of the room. Lightning strikes the hotel and the lights of both the corridor and elevator to flicker out. A ghostly wind blows through a window and the reflection of riders in the elevator becomes distorted. With another blast, the elevator rumbles and shakes, and with a final blast of lightning, the electrified reflection disappears, leaving only the image of the empty elevator in the mirror as the doors close. The elevator descends (or ascends in shaft C) and opens to reveal a blue lighted corridor with an image of another elevator where ghosts of the five missing passengers appear. They beckon riders to join them before disappearing in a bolt of electricity which scatters throughout the floor. The lights dim, and the walls in the corridor become a star field, leaving just the other elevator. The other elevator doors open to reveal the lost passengers inside as both elevators appear to float through space.

The distant guests fall, then the distant elevator shatters, followed by the ride elevator falling. This version of the ride does not have a randomized drop sequence, so the ride experience is identical in every drop shaft, regardless of which floor passengers board on. Two small drops occur in pitch-black darkness, followed by a rise to the top of the tower as in-cabin lights flicker. The doors then open out to reveal the view from the top floor before the car drops briefly, pauses, and drops along the remainder of the shaft. The elevator then rises almost to the top, and immediately drops without stopping, in complete darkness. The elevator then ascends all the way to the top of the tower, shudders, and falls to the bottom of the shaft, to the area in between the two loading floors, with the elevator being finally returned to its load level and horizontally pulled back into place at the boiler room service doors. The service doors open and guests exit the hotel through the basement and the gift shop.

==== The Twilight Zone Tower of Terror – A New Dimension of Chills (Paris, 2019–present) ====
The Paris Tower of Terror in 2011

On September 10, 2019, it was announced that the Paris version would be "reimagined" to The Twilight Zone Tower of Terror – A New Dimension of Chills. The ride was enhanced with new ride profiles, drop sequences, effects, and storylines that expand upon the original one. According to Imagineer Tom Fitzgerald, the reimagining introduced three new Twilight Zone storylines, each starring the little girl who disappeared in the hotel's elevator from the original story and the attraction's name was changed to The Twilight Zone Tower of Terror – A New Dimension of Chills, which opened on September 28, 2019.

=== Closure at Disney California Adventure ===
On July 23, 2016, at San Diego Comic-Con, Disney announced that the Anaheim version would be replaced by an attraction based on Marvel Studios' Guardians of the Galaxy film series, titled Guardians of the Galaxy – Mission: Breakout!, which opened in May 2017 and uses the same structure and ride system. This is the first American Disney attraction to be based on the Marvel Cinematic Universe (Marvel Entertainment having been wholly acquired by Disney in 2009).

Tower of Terror's final day of operation at Disney California Adventure was January 2, 2017; the ride then closed January 3. In preparation for the closure, Disney began a "farewell" promotion of the ride on September 9, 2016, which featured a "Late Check Out" option to experience the drop portion of the ride in total darkness. The same audio would play, but the show scenes on the fifth and fourth floors would be completely dark. On the night of September 19 and early morning of September 20, the "Hollywood Tower Hotel" sign was removed to prepare for the new attraction. The other two Disney parks with The Twilight Zone versions of the Tower of Terror are unaffected, and Disney has stated that there are no plans to change the attraction in its other locations.

== Tokyo DisneySea version ==
Tower of Terror
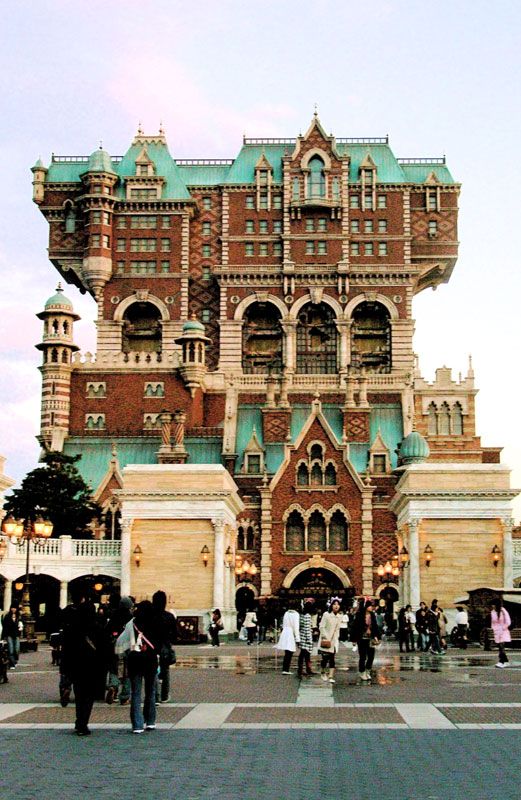
- Tower of Terror at Tokyo DisneySea

Tokyo DisneySea
- Name: Tower of Terror (Japanese: タワー・オブ・テラー, Hepburn: Tawā Obu terā)
- Area: American Waterfront
- Coordinates: 35.6254767°N 139.8851705°E
- Status: Operating
- Opening date: September 22, 2006; 20 years ago
- Disney Premier Access available

Ride statistics
- Attraction type: Drop tower dark ride
- Manufacturer: Mitsubishi Heavy Industries
- Designer: Walt Disney Imagineering
- Music: Joel McNeely
- Height: 40 m (130 ft)
- Speed: 55 km/h (34 mph)
- G-force: 1.3
- Vehicle type: Elevator
- Vehicles: 6
- Riders per vehicle: 22
- Rows: 3
- Riders per row: 7 (rows 1 and 2); 8 (row 3)
- Duration: 2:25
- Height restriction: 102 cm (3 ft 4 in)
- Must transfer from wheelchair

The attraction at Tokyo DisneySea is known simply as Tower of Terror and omits any connection or tie-in whatsoever with The Twilight Zone, as the television series is not well known in Japan. Instead, the attraction focuses on an original storyline, set in the fictional Hotel Hightower. The ride tower is located in the American Waterfront area of the park, close to the S.S. Columbia ocean liner, and its facade is an example of Moorish Revival architecture. The ride system for this version is similar to that of the Disney California Adventure and Disney Adventure World versions.

=== Storyline ===
The storyline of the attraction is more complex than that of its American and French counterparts. The scenario involves the adventures of the hotel's famous builder and owner, Harrison Hightower III (modeled after Imagineering executive Joe Rohde), who went on many expeditions throughout the world and collected thousands of priceless artifacts. Most of these artifacts were stolen for personal gain and stored in his hotel. One of them is an Nkondi style idol named Shiriki Utundu, brought in by Hightower from an expedition to Africa. Hightower claimed that the natives were angry to have their beloved god taken, and that they threatened that the idol would curse him.

On New Year's Eve 1899, Hightower held a press conference about his expedition to Africa, followed by a party, where he boasted about how he acquired the idol and denied claims of it being cursed. Just as he left the party, he mocked the idol, using its head to put out his cigar. Around midnight, he entered the elevator to retire to his private apartments in the hotel penthouse. As the elevator neared the top, the idol came to life.

The idol's rage and power caused the elevator to plummet and crash on the ground floor, with Hightower inside it. When the doors were pried open, only his hat and the idol were recovered. The hotel was abruptly closed and condemned for more than a decade, rumored by locals to be haunted. In 1912, following pressure to demolish the hotel, a New York restoration company reopened it because of its historical significance and now offers paid tours of the building. It is on these "tours" that guests embark when they enter the hotel.

=== Queue and preshow ===
The queue area winds through gardens filled with statues from many different countries up to the Hotel Hightower. Guests then enter the lobby. On each ceiling arch is painted a mural of Hightower on one of his adventures, portraying his escape from native people with a valuable artifact or item in his possession. At the end of the lobby is the elevator in its destroyed state, its doors left open with only a single plank of wood holding them together. Guests are then ushered into a room filled with many photographs of Hightower, his expeditions, and his hotel.

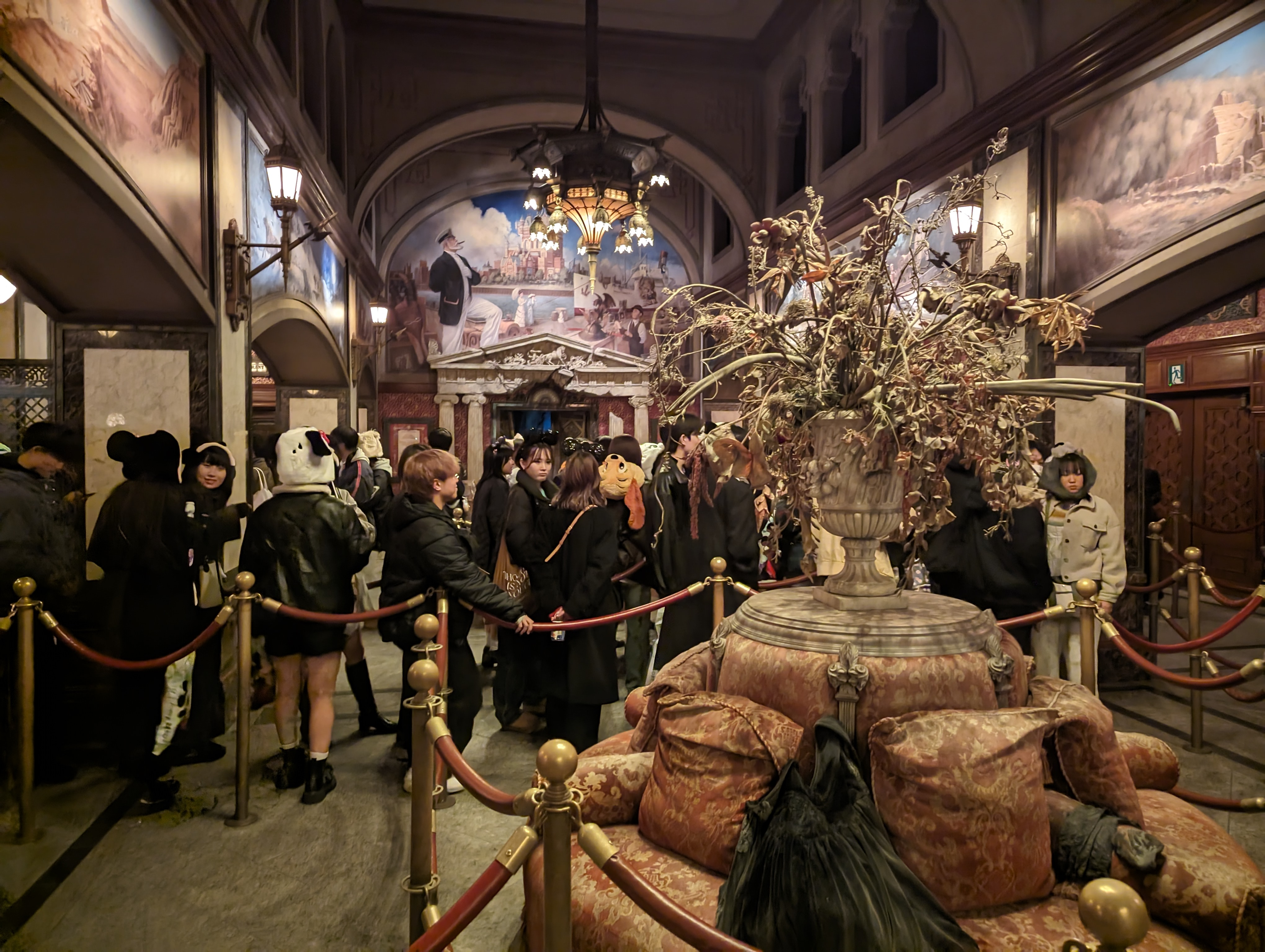
The Hotel Hightower's lobby

Guests enter Hightower's office, where a large stained glass window depicts a confident Hightower, while Shiriki Utundu sits on a pedestal nearby the stained glass. A tour guide talks about Hightower, then winds up an old gramophone that plays a recording of Hightower's last interview. The lights dim and the stained glass window changes to show a frightened Hightower holding the idol, Hightower's voice echoing throughout the office, warning guests the curse is real, and then entering the elevator on that fateful night, then shows the outside of the hotel. All throughout, as the elevator ascends, Hightower urging them to leave while they can. All the lights in the hotel go out, and a flash of green lightning shatters the bottom of the window. Shiriki Utundu comes to life, laughs mischievously at the guests, and vanishes into a star-field. A gray fog covers the window, which remains the same when the fog lifts. Guests are then ushered into an enormous storage room where Hightower kept his treasures.

=== Ride experience ===
The mechanics of DisneySea's Tower of Terror are identical to the installations at Disney California Adventure and Disney Adventure World, although there are thematic changes. Also, the order of the mirror and corridor scenes is reversed compared to the American and European counterparts.

As the ride begins, a flash of electricity appears on top of the elevator doors, as the lights flicker and then go out. While the elevator is pushed backward, the ghost of Harrison Hightower III calls the riders fools, and explains the idol had cursed him to repeatedly experience the same fate. The glowing green eyes of the idol appear in the darkness as the elevator enters the drop shaft. The elevator quickly ascends and the doors open at the penthouse floor, revealing the idol sitting on a table in the center of the room. Hightower's spirit physically appears beside the idol and mocks it. The idol zaps him with a bolt of green electricity, blasting him backward past the open elevator doors at the opposite end of the apartments. Hightower falls down the shaft as the entire apartment fades away, and a starfield comes into view. The idol turns toward the guests' elevator and laughs before the doors close.

The elevator ascends again (in shaft C, it actually descends), and the doors reopen on the ballroom floor with a large ornate mirror on the back wall. Hightower tells the guests to wave and say "goodbye" to themselves. As they do, the lighting of the hotel is replaced with an eerie green glow, making the reflections of the guests seem ghostlike – an effect similar to the Anaheim and Paris rides. The ghostly reflection of the riders disappears and leaves the idol alone in the empty elevator. The idol laughs menacingly at the riders and suddenly shoots forward at them. The elevator vibrates, then begins the drop sequence. At the end of the drop sequence, the elevator returns to its loading level, where the idol's green eyes glare one last time in the dark and then disappear as Hightower warns riders to never return.

=== Tower of Terror "Unlimited" ===
In the winter months usually from January to March, Tokyo DisneySea's version has a special version meant to "double the fear" by including 2 new ride experiences with their own drop profile. The ride patterns have been dubbed Tour A (Level 13), and Tour B (Shadow Of Shriki). The overall ride storyline is still the same, but with the addition of new effects. Tour A has 4 drops, and has a more haunting feel to it, and more intense drops.

Tour B has 6 drops, and Shriki appears more often throughout the ride. This includes a projection of its shadow cutting one of the elevator cables, and its head floating towards the elevator inside of a starfield on the penthouse floor. The overlay was introduced in 2012. Tour A, and Tour B were introduced in 2015. The overlay varies with either all shafts having the same ride profile, or all 3 of them having their own separate one.

== The Twilight Zone references in the attraction ==
In an effort to be true to the spirit of The Twilight Zone, Disney Imagineers watched every episode of the original television show at least twice. The attraction buildings are littered with references to Twilight Zone episodes.

=== Disney's Hollywood Studios ===
- The Mystic Seer machine from the episode "Nick of Time" can be seen sitting on the high shelf in the libraries, near the television.
- The book titled "To Serve Man", from the episode of the same name, is seen in both libraries.
- Chalk marks can be seen on one of walls of the waiting area that leads from the elevator unload, a reference to the episode "Little Girl Lost". In Paris, this can be found in the upper level of the boiler room next to the attraction warning signage; a similar version was present in Disney's California Adventure.
- The slot machine from the episode "The Fever" is seen in one of the unload areas.
- The ventriloquist dummy Caesar from the episode "Caesar and Me" is present in both unload areas.
- From the episode "The Invaders", the eponymous characters are found on display in both libraries; they are also present in Paris.
- An envelope with Rod Serling's name on it can be found in one of the libraries as well as another envelope with Victoria West's in the other library, a reference to the episode "A World of His Own". These envelopes were also formally present at Disney California Adventure.
- A poster advertising "Anthony Fremont's Orchestra" is displayed next to the concierge desk in the lobby, an ironic reference to Anthony Fremont, the young boy with god-like powers from the episode "It's a Good Life", since he had a strong dislike for singing. This poster was displayed in the photo gallery at Disney California Adventure.
- On the concierge's desk, an issue of Photoplay magazine sits open to an article titled "Four Pages of Hilarious Star Caricatures by Walt Disney".

=== Disney California Adventure ===
- A door with the number 22 in brass numbering was present in the hotel lobby as a reference to the episode "Twenty Two".
- A Shirley Temple doll sat on the hotel lobby, similar to the one at Walt Disney Studios.
- A gold thimble accompanied by a card that read, "Looking for a gift for Mother? Find it in our Gift Shop!" was present inside a glass case adjacent to the doors outside the library, a reference to the episode "The After Hours".
- An envelope with Rod Serling's name on it were found in one of the libraries as well as another envelope with Victoria West's in the other library, a reference to the episode "A World of His Own". These envelopes are also present at Disney's Hollywood Studios.
- Similar to the queue of the Disney Adventure World version, chalk marks on the walls in the same style as those in the episode "Little Girl Lost" were present in the upper level of the boiler room next to the attraction warning signage. Periodically the girl's voice would've been heard calling out for help from the wall and from the radios around the boiler room.
- There was a display case in the photo gallery that contained two items relating to the episode "A Thing about Machines". One was a typewriter with a message that read: "GET OUT OF HERE FINCHLEY" and a card next to it that read "Almost Writes By Itself". There was also an electric razor; its card read "Has A Long Cord - Can Follow You Everywhere". There was also a toy telephone from the episode "Long Distance Call" with a card reading "Perfect for the children's room and those late night calls from Grandma".
- Whilst exiting, there was a display window for "Willoughby Travel", a nod to the episode "A Stop at Willoughby".
- A poster advertising "Anthony Fremont's Orchestra" was displayed in the photo gallery; Anthony Fremont was the young boy with god-like powers from the episode "It's a Good Life". This poster is displayed next to the concierge desk in the lobby at Disney's Hollywood Studios.

=== Disney Adventure World ===
- A dusty old doll sits on a couch in the hotel lobby, believed to be Talky Tina from the episode "Living Doll", the little girl in the attraction's pre-show and experience or Sally Shine from the 1997 movie Tower of Terror.
- The queue of the Paris version features a reference to the episode "Little Girl Lost". Chalk marks on the walls are in the same style as those in the episode, when people were trying to find the portal to the girl. This can be found in the upper level of the boiler room next to the attraction warning signage. Periodically the girl's voice can be heard calling out for help from the wall and from the radios around the boiler room. In Disney's Hollywood Studios, this can be seen on one of walls of the waiting area that leads from the elevator unload.
- Upon exiting, the display cases on the ground floor contain advertisements for, among other things, a "Housemaid Wanted" (a reference to the episode "I Sing The Body Electric") and for "A Pair of Reading Glasses Wanted" ("Time Enough At Last").
- From the episode "The Invaders", the eponymous characters are found on display in both libraries; they are also present in Disney's Hollywood Studios.

=== Disney's Hollywood Studios, Disney California Adventure, and Disney Adventure World ===
- The pre-show includes a little girl holding a hidden Mickey in the form of a Mickey Mouse plush toy; this one appears again in the corridor scene. A hidden Mickey can also be found in each corner of the library's carpet pattern. A third hidden Mickey exists in one of the libraries in the form of a sheet music of the 1932 song "What! No Mickey Mouse? (What Kind of Party is This?)", composed by Irving Caesar.
- The trumpet from "A Passage for Trumpet" can be seen in one of the libraries.
- The elevator has an inspection certification, signed by Mr. Cadwallader, the sinister deal-maker from the episode "Escape Clause". The last inspection date of the elevator is October 31, 1939, the very same night lightning struck the Hollywood Tower Hotel. Its certification number is 10259, a nod to October 2, 1959, the date The Twilight Zone first aired.
- The flying saucer from the episode "The Invaders" is present hanging from the ceiling in the unload areas.
- The corridor scene was heavily inspired by the 1985 revival of The Twilight Zone opening sequence which depicts an empty room with a window at the end. Near the end, the entire room phases into a starfield, and the window morphs into the title text. All versions reference this, including the Tokyo DisneySea version.
- "Picture If You Will...", a phrase Rod Serling often used in various Twilight Zone episodes, appears in the area where guests purchase their on-ride photo; in Disney's Hollywood Studios, this phrase appears in the area where guests scan their park ticket or MagicBand for their on-ride photo and video.
- In promotional television commercials for the attraction, an elevator's floor indicator outside the doors can be seen with its needle pointing past the 12th floor to the 13th, a reference to the 9th floor in the episode "The After Hours".
- Although not a reference to The Twilight Zone, there is a felt letter board with the hotel's directory for amenities, located between the inoperable elevators in the lobby, with missing letters that have fallen to the bottom of the board to spell a message. In Orlando, the message spells "TAKE THE STAIRS", (Note: Originally in Orlando, the letters at the bottom of the board spelled out "EVIL TOWER". After the terrorist attacks of September 11, 2001, Disney Imagineers opted to remove that message. The board still remains unchanged, with missing letters that would spell "EVIL TOWER".) while in Paris, the message spells "COME WITH ME".

=== Tokyo DisneySea ===
- The Season 1 theme of The Twilight Zone plays in the outside portion of the queue line.
- The Penthouse scene is inspired by the 1985 revival of The Twilight Zone opening sequence, which is also referenced in every other version of the ride.

== Soundtrack ==
Jazz music from the 1930s is played in the queueing area for the Tower of Terror at Disney's Hollywood Studios, as well as in the lobby and library. The ride's score was composed by Richard Bellis, except for the Tokyo DisneySea version, which was scored by Joel McNeely, who has released the overture on his site. Bellis incorporates the main Twilight Zone theme, composed by Marius Constant, to the attraction's theme, which can be found on several theme park albums:

- Disneyland/Walt Disney World Music Vacation (as part of a medley)
- Walt Disney World Resort: The Official Album (1999)
- Walt Disney World Resort: Official Album (2000)
- Official Album: Walt Disney World Resort Celebrating 100 Years of Magic (2001)
- The Official Album of the Disneyland Resort (2005)
- Disneyland Resort: Official Album (2013)
- Walt Disney World: Official Album (2013)
- Walt Disney Records: The Legacy Collection – Disneyland (2015)

== In media ==
=== In television ===
The Twilight Zone Tower of Terror was featured in the 1994 Halloween edition of Disney Channel's Walt Disney World Inside Out, hosted by Scott Herriott, where guest star Gilbert Gottfried set out to experience Tower of Terror himself.

The attraction features in the Disney+ docu-series Behind the Attraction, produced by Dwayne Johnson, released on July 21, 2021. The episode also features the Tokyo variant and the transformation of the Disney California Adventure version to Guardians of the Galaxy – Mission: Breakout!.

=== Television film adaptation ===
Following the attraction's success, Walt Disney Television produced the TV film Tower of Terror, starring Steven Guttenberg and Kirsten Dunst. Based on the attraction itself and not The Twilight Zone, it was Disney's first film based on one of its theme park attractions and the only one made for television to date. Many scenes were filmed in the attraction at Disney's Hollywood Studios, when it was still named Disney-MGM Studios, while other scenes were filmed in Disney's Burbank studios.

=== Film adaptation ===
In June 2021, it was reported that Walt Disney Pictures was developing a new film based on the attraction, starring Scarlett Johansson, who would also produce the project through her production company, These Pictures, alongside Jonathan Lia, while Josh Cooley would write the script. Development on the film was initially canceled following Johansson's lawsuit against Disney after the company released the Marvel film Black Widow on the streaming service Disney+, but resumed after the lawsuit was settled.

== See also ==
- Tower of Terror, a 1997 television movie based on the attraction.
- Incidents at Walt Disney World
- List of amusement rides based on television franchises
- Guardians of the Galaxy – Mission: Breakout!
