= San Francisco Composers Chamber Orchestra =

The San Francisco Composers Chamber Orchestra (SFCCO) is a chamber orchestra based in San Francisco, California, United States. It was established in 2002 and is dedicated to the performance of contemporary classical music, most often works by the orchestra's members. The group has also performed music by other California composers, including John Cage, Henry Cowell, Bernard Herrmann, Darius Milhaud, Terry Riley, Gerhard Samuel, and Igor Stravinsky.

The orchestra's conductor, co-founder, and music director is Mark Alburger; co-founder and executive director is Erling Wold. Its associate conductors are John Kendall Bailey and Martha Stoddard; other board members are Michael Cooke, Lisa Scola Prosek.

The San Francisco Composers Chamber Orchestra (SFCCO) is a unique orchestra in the U.S. Since its first concert in March 2002, the SFCCO has premiered more new works than any other orchestra in the San Francisco Bay Area. The ensemble consists primarily of composer/performers, forming a unique organization dedicated to democratizing the symphony orchestra, making it available to composers of many styles and in many stages of development, from the established to the emerging. The result is a diverse offering of new music. In any one concert, an audience may hear many styles, including Neoromantic, Serial, Neoclassical, Minimalist, Noise and Improvised.

The SFCCO takes an informal approach to its concerts, emphasizing communication with the audience in talks before, between and after pieces, drawing listeners into the music-making. The group's goal is to reverse the mainstream orchestral trend which features mostly older classical music by performing 6–8 new works a concert, rather than only a few new pieces a year.

== See also ==
- American Composers Orchestra
- San Francisco Symphony
