= Erling Wold =

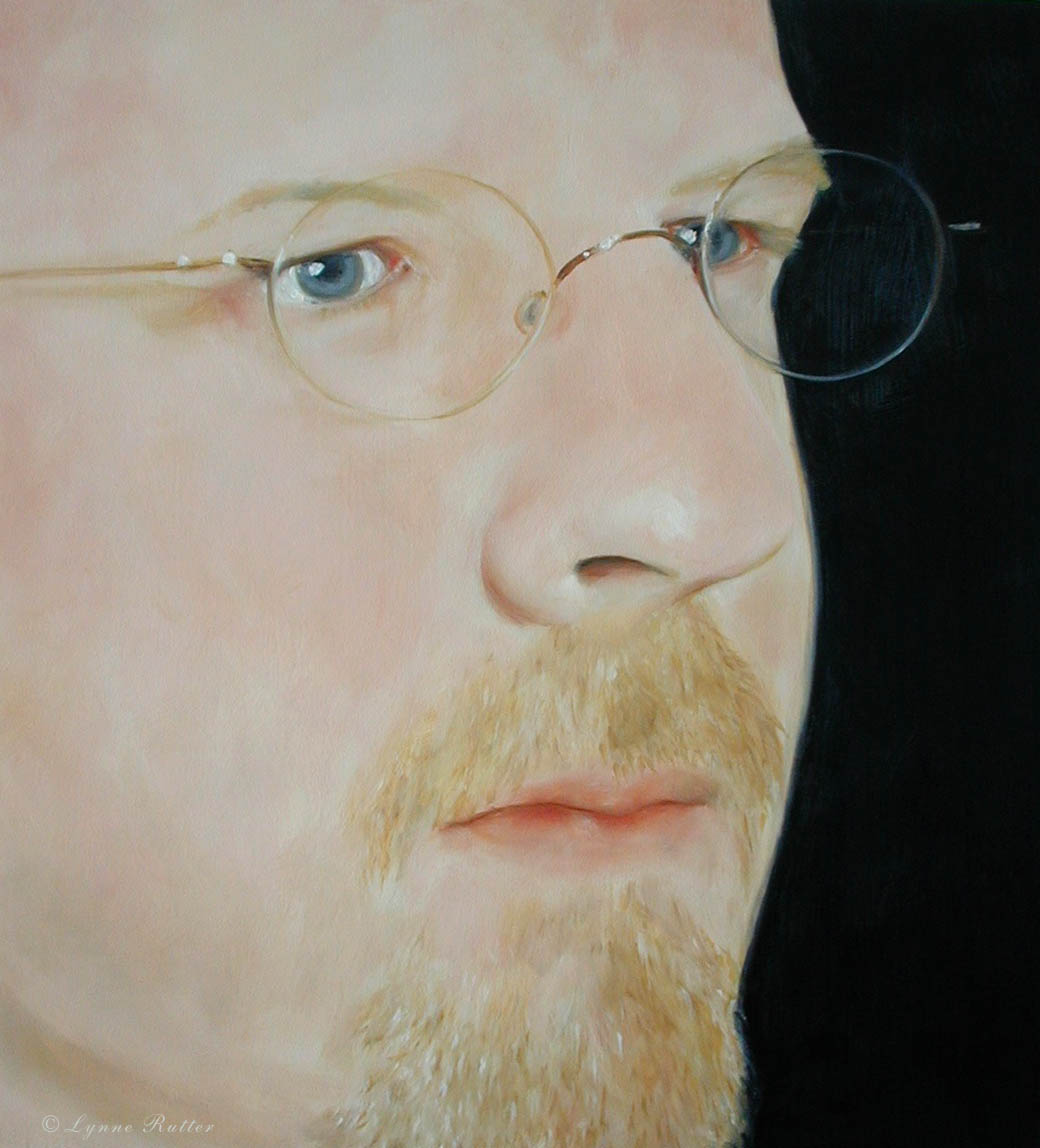
- Portrait of Erling Wold, painted by Lynne Rutter

Background information
- Born: January 30, 1958 (age 68); Burbank, California, United States
- Genres: Postminimalism, Classical, Contemporary classical
- Occupations: Composer, Engineer
- Instruments: Piano, Guitar
- Years active: 1976–present
- Labels: Table of the Elements, MinMax, Spooky Pooch
- Spouse(s): Lynn Murdock, Lynne Rutter
- Website: www.erlingwold.com

Erling Wold (born January 30, 1958, in Burbank, California) is a San Francisco-based composer of opera and contemporary classical music. He is best known for his later chamber operas, and his early experiments as a microtonalist.

== Life ==
Wold was born into a religious family, the son of Erling Henry Wold Sr, a Lutheran minister and Margaret Barth Wold, an author of inspirational books and plays. He was given piano lessons at an early age but showed little interest in music until his teen years, when he became infatuated, teaching himself to play a variety of instruments and embracing the music of many of the modernist composers. It was also at this point that he started to write music. He first studied composition at Occidental College with Robert Gross where he was awarded the Elinor Remick Warren Composition Award in 1978. Later teachers included Gerard Grisey, Andrew Imbrie and John Chowning at the University of California, Berkeley and Stanford University, where he primarily studied computer music, gaining a facility with the mathematics of signal processing. While at Berkeley, he married Lynn Murdock, for whom he wrote a number of his early works. In 1985, they had a son, Duncan Renaldo Wold. He married the painter Lynne Rutter in 2010.

After earning his doctorate at Berkeley in 1987, he went to work for Yamaha Music Technologies, writing a number of patents in music synthesis and processing. During this period, most of his music was electronic, and he was an early advocate of the Synclavier. His work at this time with a number of San Francisco performance artists and dancers led to his continuing interest in theater. After leaving Yamaha in 1992, he cofounded Muscle Fish, an audio and music software company, later acquired by Audible Magic. By 1995 he had migrated back to writing instrumental music and wrote his first chamber opera based on Max Ernst's collage novel A Little Girl Dreams of Taking the Veil, a critical and popular success which has been revived several times, including performances by the Paul Dresher Ensemble and by the Klagenfurter ensemble. The success of the production led to a residency at ODC Theater in San Francisco, where he premiered his opera Queer based on William S. Burroughs' early autobiographical novel of the same name in 2001 and Sub Pontio Pilato in 2003. There have been few purely musical works during this period, but some notable exceptions are Close, played by Relâche and others, the piano pieces Albrechts Fluegel, premiered by Finnish pianist Marja Mutru, and Veracity. He has had a close relationship with several theaters in Austria, where a number of his recent operas have been premiered, including Uksus, Rattensturm and Daphnes Garten.

Although he rejected the Christian religion in his teens, many of his operatic works deal with religious themes. A Little Girl Dreams of Taking the Veil is a surrealistic dream of young girl about to enter a convent, Sub Pontio Pilato is an epic historical fantasy on the death and resurrection of Pontius Pilate, and Certitude and Joy tells the story of a young woman who kills her three children on orders from God. His Mass named for Notker the Stammerer, commissioned by the Cathedral of St Gall is a straightforward setting of the liturgy along with several Psalms.

His earliest music was atonal and arrhythmic, but the influences of just intonation and the music of the minimalists led to the bulk of his music being composed in a variety of tonal genres. He was attracted by the theater and much of his music is either directly dramatic or is based on dramatic rather than purely musical structures. Wold is an eclectic composer who has also been called "the Eric Satie of Berkeley surrealist/minimalist electro-art rock" by the Village Voice.

He composed the soundtracks for a number of films by the independent film director Jon Jost as well as Blake Eckard.

There are a number of CD and DVD releases of Wold's music. He has published artistic and technical articles in several publications, including the Leonardo Music Journal, IEEE MultiMedia, IEEE Signal Processing, Proceedings of the International Computer Music Conference, SIGGRAPH, the Just Intonation Network Journal 1/1, IEEE Transactions on Computers and several books.

He is the Executive Director of the San Francisco Composers Chamber Orchestra.

== Discography ==
- Daphnes Garten (2023). On Spooky Pooch. Conducted by Davorin Mori.
- Rattensturm (2019). On Spooky Pooch. Conducted by Alexei Kornienko.
- UKSUS (2019). On MinMax. Performed by Timur Bekbosunov et al, conducted by Bryan Nies.
- Certitude and Joy (2014). On MinMax. Performed by Laura Bohn et al., and the ZOFO Duet.
- Mordake (2010). On MinMax. Performed by John Duykers, and the SFCCO under Mark Alburger.
- Missa Beati Notkeri Balbuli Sancti Galli Monachi (2010). On Spooky Pooch Records. Recorded at the Abbey of Saint Gall under the direction of Hans Eberhard, with Kimberly Brockman, soprano.
- Sub Pontio Pilato (2006), a live performance at ODC Theater, with Jonathan Khuner conducting, starring John Duykers. On Spooky Pooch Records.
- queer (2002). Conducted by Dierdre McClure with Trauma Flintstone in the lead role. On Spooky Pooch Records.
- A Little Girl Dreams of Taking the Veil (2001). Conducted by Dierdre McClure, presented by ODC Theater. On MinMax.
- The Bed You Sleep In (1992). Soundtrack for a movie by Jon Jost. On Table of the Elements.
- I Weep (1992). On Spooky Pooch.
- Music of Love (1987). For microtonal Synclavier. On Spooky Pooch.
- Tellus #14 Just Intonation (1986). Harvestworks.

== Works ==
=== Chamber opera ===
- Daphnes Garten (2023) on the murder of Daphne Caruana Galizia, libretto by Katharina Tiwald.
- Rattensturm (2018) on the sinking of the SMS Szent István, libretto by Peter Wagner.
- Uksus (2012-2016) based on the writings of Daniil Kharms.
- Certitude and Joy (2012) on the dangers and ecstasies of religious faith.
- Mordake (2008) a solo opera for John Duykers on the story of Edward Mordake; libretto by Douglas Kearney.
- Blinde Liebe (2005) an interactive dance opera on a true crime story
- Sub Pontio Pilato (2003) an historical fantasy on Pontius Pilate with libretto by James Bisso
- die Nacht wird kommen... (2002) a German language version of A Little Girl Dreams of Taking the Veil
- queer (2000, revised 2011) based on the novel by William S. Burroughs
- A Little Girl Dreams of Taking the Veil (1995, revised 2000) based on Max Ernst's collage novel

=== Dance ===
- Trio (2004) a joint composition with Thom Blum for Deborah Slater Dance Theater
- i brought my hips to the table (1998) text by Michelle Murphy
- Abstaende (1995) dance by Palindrome Dance Company
- Egg (1990) - dance by Gay White
- Crash (1987)
- Dance of the Testifiers (1987)
- Dance of the Polygamists (1987)

=== Orchestra ===
- Certitude and Joy (2011) commissioned and premiered by the Sofia Symphonic Orchestra
- Brightness (2004) for clarinet and orchestra, premiered by Rachel Condry.

=== Choral ===
- Missa Beati Notkeri Balbuli Sancti Galli Monachi (2006)

=== Chamber ===
- walking along the embarcadero past pier 7 and the flowers (2011) for two pianos
- Veracity (2001) for piano
- Close (1997) for chamber ensemble
- Albrechts Fluegel (1995) for piano
- Seven Days Ago (1990)
- It was in the summer that I first noticed your hair, your face, your eyelids (1988)

=== Film ===
- Coyotes Kill For Fun (2017) film by Blake Eckard
- Bubba Moon Face (2011) film by Blake Eckard
- La Lunga Ombra (2005) film by Jon Jost
- Homecoming (2004) film by Jon Jost
- London Brief (1997) film by Jon Jost
- The Bed You Sleep In (1993) film by Jon Jost
- Sure Fire (1990) film by Jon Jost

=== Songs ===
- Raheel (2003) text by Dima Hilal
- Harvest of Rage (2000) songs for tenor and orchestra
- 13 Versions of Surrender (1996) text by Michelle Murphy
- Center Mother and Boss Puss (1990) text by Antonin Artaud
