= 2019–20 Minnesota Timberwolves season =

NBA professional basketball team season

- Head coach: Ryan Saunders
- General manager: Scott Layden
- Owners: Glen Taylor
- Arena: Target Center

Results
- Record: 19–45 (.297)
- Place: Division: 5th (Northwest); Conference: 14th (Western)
- Playoff finish: Did not qualify
- Stats at Basketball Reference

Local media
- Television: Fox Sports North
- Radio: WCCO

The 2019–20 Minnesota Timberwolves season was the 31st season of the franchise in the National Basketball Association (NBA).

The season was suspended by the league officials following the games of March 11 after it was reported that Rudy Gobert tested positive for COVID-19. On June 4, 2020, the season came to an end for the Timberwolves when the NBA Board of Governors approved a plan that would restart the season with 22 teams returning to play on July 31, 2020, in the NBA Bubble, which was approved by the National Basketball Players Association the next day. Due to their poor record, the Timberwolves season came to an end. However the Timberwolves won the draft lottery giving them the 1st pick in the 2020 NBA draft.

== Draft ==
Round	Pick	Player	Position	Nationality	College
1	11	Cameron Johnson	Small Forward	United States	North Carolina
2	43	Jaylen Nowell	Point guard	United States	Washington

The Timberwolves held both a first- and a second-round draft pick entering the draft. The second-round pick was acquired from the Charlotte Hornets and was originally owned by the Miami Heat.

The 11th pick, along with Dario Šarić, was traded to the Phoenix Suns in exchange for the 6th pick Jarrett Culver.

== Roster ==
2019–20 Minnesota Timberwolves roster
Players

Pos.	No.	Player	Height	Weight	DOB	From
G	5	Malik Beasley	6 ft 4 in (1.93 m)	187 lb (85 kg)	1996–11–26	Florida State
G	23	Jarrett Culver	6 ft 6 in (1.98 m)	195 lb (88 kg)	1999–02–20	Texas Tech
G	12	Jacob Evans	6 ft 4 in (1.93 m)	210 lb (95 kg)	1997–06–18	Cincinnati
F	41	Juan Hernangómez	6 ft 9 in (2.06 m)	214 lb (97 kg)	1995–09–28	Spain
F	16	James Johnson	6 ft 7 in (2.01 m)	240 lb (109 kg)	1987–02–20	Wake Forest
F	10	Jake Layman	6 ft 9 in (2.06 m)	209 lb (95 kg)	1994–03–07	Maryland
F	30	Kelan Martin (TW)	6 ft 5 in (1.96 m)	230 lb (104 kg)	1995–08–03	Butler
G	6	Jordan McLaughlin (TW)	5 ft 11 in (1.80 m)	185 lb (84 kg)	1996–04–09	USC
G	4	Jaylen Nowell	6 ft 4 in (1.93 m)	201 lb (91 kg)	1999–07–09	Washington
G	20	Josh Okogie	6 ft 4 in (1.93 m)	213 lb (97 kg)	1998–09–01	Georgia Tech
C	11	Naz Reid	6 ft 10 in (2.08 m)	264 lb (120 kg)	1999–08–26	LSU
G	0	D'Angelo Russell (injured)	6 ft 4 in (1.93 m)	193 lb (88 kg)	1996–02–23	Ohio State
F	14	Omari Spellman	6 ft 9 in (2.06 m)	245 lb (111 kg)	1997–07–21	Villanova
C	32	Karl-Anthony Towns (injured)	7 ft 0 in (2.13 m)	248 lb (112 kg)	1995–11–15	Kentucky
G/F	1	Evan Turner	6 ft 7 in (2.01 m)	220 lb (100 kg)	1988–06–10	Ohio State
F	3	Jarred Vanderbilt	6 ft 9 in (2.06 m)	214 lb (97 kg)	1999–04–03	Kentucky

Coaches
Head coach
- Ryan Saunders
Assistant(s)
- Kevin Burleson
- Bryan Gates
- Kevin Hanson
- Pablo Prigioni
- David Vanterpool (Associate HC)

Legend
- (DP) Unsigned draft pick
- (FA) Free agent
- (S) Suspended
- (GL) On assignment to G League affiliate
- (TW) Two-way affiliate player
- Injured

Roster
Updated: 2020–02–06

== Standings ==
=== Division ===
Northwest Division	W	L	PCT	GB	Home	Road	Div	GP
y – Denver Nuggets	46	27	.630	–	26‍–‍11	20‍–‍16	12–2	73
x – Oklahoma City Thunder	44	28	.611	1.5	23‍–‍14	21‍–‍14	8–5	72
x – Utah Jazz	44	28	.611	1.5	23‍–‍12	21‍–‍16	5–7	72
x – Portland Trail Blazers	35	39	.473	11.5	21‍–‍15	14‍–‍24	5–8	74
Minnesota Timberwolves	19	45	.297	22.5	8‍–‍24	11‍–‍21	2–10	64

=== Conference ===
Western Conference
#	Team	W	L	PCT	GB	GP
1	c – Los Angeles Lakers *	52	19	.732	–	71
2	x – Los Angeles Clippers	49	23	.681	3.5	72
3	y – Denver Nuggets *	46	27	.630	7.0	73
4	y – Houston Rockets *	44	28	.611	8.5	72
5	x – Oklahoma City Thunder	44	28	.611	8.5	72
6	x – Utah Jazz	44	28	.611	8.5	72
7	x – Dallas Mavericks	43	32	.573	11.0	75
8	x – Portland Trail Blazers	35	39	.473	18.5	74
9	pi – Memphis Grizzlies	34	39	.466	19.0	73
10	Phoenix Suns	34	39	.466	19.0	73
11	San Antonio Spurs	32	39	.451	20.0	71
12	Sacramento Kings	31	41	.431	21.5	72
13	New Orleans Pelicans	30	42	.417	22.5	72
14	Minnesota Timberwolves	19	45	.297	29.5	64
15	Golden State Warriors	15	50	.231	34.0	65

== Game log ==
=== Preseason ===
2019 preseason game log
Total: 2–3 (Home: 1–0; Road: 1–3)
Preseason: 2–3 (home: 1–0; road: 1–3)

Game	Date	Team	Score	High points	High rebounds	High assists	Location Attendance	Record
1	October 8	@ Phoenix	L 106–111	Karl-Anthony Towns (19)	Karl-Anthony Towns (10)	Shabazz Napier (7)	Talking Stick Resort Arena; 7,593	0–1
2	October 10	@ Golden State	L 123–143	Layman, Culver (17)	Naz Reid (11)	Josh Okogie (5)	Chase Center; 18,064	0–2
3	October 13	Maccabi Haifa	W 131–101	Treveon Graham (14)	Noah Vonleh (8)	Jarrett Culver (4)	Target Center; 8,703	1–2
4	October 15	@ Indiana	W 119–111	Karl-Anthony Towns (33)	Robert Covington (19)	Jeff Teague (7)	Bankers Life Fieldhouse; 9,962	2–2
5	October 17	@ Milwaukee	L 96–118	Karl-Anthony Towns (16)	Robert Covington (11)	Jeff Teague (5)	Fiserv Forum; 16,148	2–3

2019–20 season schedule

=== Regular season ===
2019–20 game log
Total: 19–45 (Home: 8–24; Road: 11–21)
October: 3–1 (home: 1–0; road: 2–1)

Game	Date	Team	Score	High points	High rebounds	High assists	Location Attendance	Record
1	October 23	@ Brooklyn	W 127–126 (OT)	Karl-Anthony Towns (36)	Karl-Anthony Towns (14)	Shabazz Napier (7)	Barclays Center; 17,732	1–0
2	October 25	@ Charlotte	W 121–99	Karl-Anthony Towns (37)	Karl-Anthony Towns (15)	Karl-Anthony Towns (8)	Spectrum Center; 14,879	2–0
3	October 27	Miami	W 116–109	Andrew Wiggins (25)	Karl-Anthony Towns (11)	Jeff Teague (8)	Target Center; 17,049	3–0
4	October 30	@ Philadelphia	L 95–117	Andrew Wiggins (19)	Towns, Okogie (6)	Jeff Teague (5)	Wells Fargo Center; 20,204	3–1

November : 7–7 (home: 2–6; road: 5–1)

Game	Date	Team	Score	High points	High rebounds	High assists	Location Attendance	Record
5	November 2	@ Washington	W 131–109	Andrew Wiggins (21)	Gorgui Dieng (8)	Jeff Teague (13)	Capital One Arena; 15,150	4–1
6	November 4	Milwaukee	L 106–134	Andrew Wiggins (25)	Josh Okogie (7)	Napier, Dieng (4)	Target Center; 16,271	4–2
7	November 6	@ Memphis	L 121–137	Andrew Wiggins (30)	Karl-Anthony Towns (13)	Jarrett Culver (7)	FedExForum; 13,503	4–3
8	November 8	Golden State	W 125–119 (OT)	Andrew Wiggins (40)	Karl-Anthony Towns (14)	Andrew Wiggins (7)	Target Center; 15,647	5–3
9	November 10	Denver	L 98–100 (OT)	Wiggins, Towns (25)	Karl-Anthony Towns (16)	Karl-Anthony Towns (6)	Target Center; 13,553	5–4
10	November 11	@ Detroit	W 120–114	Andrew Wiggins (33)	Karl-Anthony Towns (8)	Karl-Anthony Towns (6)	Little Caesars Arena; 12,526	6–4
11	November 13	San Antonio	W 129–114	Andrew Wiggins (30)	Karl-Anthony Towns (11)	Andrew Wiggins (7)	Target Center; 11,581	7–4
12	November 15	Washington	L 116–137	Karl-Anthony Towns (36)	Karl-Anthony Towns (10)	Jeff Teague (11)	Target Center; 12,716	7–5
13	November 16	Houston	L 105–125	Karl-Anthony Towns (27)	Karl-Anthony Towns (15)	Jeff Teague (12)	Target Center; 18,978	7–6
14	November 18	@ Utah	W 112–102	Karl-Anthony Towns (29)	Karl-Anthony Towns (13)	Jeff Teague (11)	Vivint Smart Home Arena; 18,306	8–6
15	November 20	Utah	L 95–103	Andrew Wiggins (22)	Karl-Anthony Towns (12)	Jeff Teague (6)	Target Center; 13,177	8–7
16	November 23	Phoenix	L 98–100	Karl-Anthony Towns (31)	Karl-Anthony Towns (17)	Jeff Teague (8)	Target Center; 17,362	8–8
17	November 25	@ Atlanta	W 125–113	Karl-Anthony Towns (28)	Karl-Anthony Towns (13)	Teague, Towns (8)	State Farm Arena; 16,218	9–8
18	November 27	@ San Antonio	W 113–101	Andrew Wiggins (26)	Karl-Anthony Towns (14)	Teague, Towns (6)	AT&T Center; 18,354	10–8

December : 2–12 (home: 1–5; road: 1–7)

Game	Date	Team	Score	High points	High rebounds	High assists	Location Attendance	Record
19	December 1	Memphis	L 107–115	Karl-Anthony Towns (21)	Karl-Anthony Towns (12)	Andrew Wiggins (7)	Target Center; 12,276	10–9
20	December 4	@ Dallas	L 114–121	Wiggins, Towns (26)	Karl-Anthony Towns (9)	Karl-Anthony Towns (7)	American Airlines Center; 19,671	10–10
21	December 6	@ Oklahoma City	L 127–139 (OT)	Jeff Teague (32)	Robert Covington (7)	Jeff Teague (9)	Chesapeake Energy Arena; 18,203	10–11
22	December 8	@ L. A. Lakers	L 125–142	Wiggins, Towns (19)	Jordan Bell (6)	Karl-Anthony Towns (8)	Staples Center; 18,997	10–12
23	December 9	@ Phoenix	L 109–125	Karl-Anthony Towns (33)	Karl-Anthony Towns (15)	Teague, Wiggins (4)	Talking Stick Resort Arena; 13,230	10–13
24	December 11	Utah	L 116–127	Jeff Teague (32)	Karl-Anthony Towns (11)	Jeff Teague (6)	Target Center; 12,369	10–14
25	December 13	L. A. Clippers	L 117–124	Karl-Anthony Towns (39)	Karl-Anthony Towns (12)	Jeff Teague (5)	Target Center; 17,585	10–15
26	December 18	New Orleans	L 99–107	Andrew Wiggins (27)	Gorgui Dieng (8)	Jeff Teague (9)	Target Center; 12,490	10–16
27	December 20	@ Denver	L 100–109	Andrew Wiggins (19)	Jordan Bell (8)	Andrew Wiggins (6)	Pepsi Center; 19,520	10–17
28	December 21	@ Portland	L 106–113	Andrew Wiggins (33)	Gorgui Dieng (12)	Jeff Teague (8)	Moda Center; 19,393	10–18
29	December 23	@ Golden State	L 104–113	Andrew Wiggins (22)	Dieng, Vonleh (8)	Teague, McLaughlin (4)	Chase Center; 18,064	10–19
30	December 26	@ Sacramento	W 105–104 (2OT)	Gorgui Dieng (21)	Gorgui Dieng (15)	Shabazz Napier (9)	Golden 1 Center; 17,583	11–19
31	December 28	Cleveland	L 88–94	Jeff Teague (18)	Noah Vonleh (9)	Jeff Teague (4)	Target Center; 15,411	11–20
32	December 30	Brooklyn	W 122–115 (OT)	Shabazz Napier (24)	Gorgui Dieng (20)	Shabazz Napier (8)	Target Center; 15,824	12–20

January : 3–12 (home: 2–7; road: 1–5)

Game	Date	Team	Score	High points	High rebounds	High assists	Location Attendance	Record
33	January 1	@ Milwaukee	L 104–106	Shabazz Napier (22)	Robert Covington (11)	Jarrett Culver (5)	Fiserv Forum; 17,819	12–21
34	January 2	Golden State	W 99–84	Napier, Covington (20)	Robert Covington (10)	Shabazz Napier (7)	Target Center; 15,477	13–21
35	January 5	@ Cleveland	W 118–103	Gorgui Dieng (22)	Gorgui Dieng (13)	Shabazz Napier (7)	Rocket Mortgage FieldHouse; 16,159	14–21
36	January 7	@ Memphis	L 112–119	Jarrett Culver (24)	Covington, Vonleh (6)	Jeff Teague (6)	FedExForum; 14,117	14–22
37	January 9	Portland	W 116–102	Andrew Wiggins (23)	Gorgui Dieng (10)	Andrew Wiggins (8)	Target Center; 13,720	15–22
38	January 11	@ Houston	L 109–139	Josh Okogie (16)	Jarrett Culver (8)	Okogie, Culver (5)	Toyota Center; 18,055	15–23
39	January 13	Oklahoma City	L 104–117	Naz Reid (20)	Okogie, Culver, Napier (5)	Jeff Teague (5)	Target Center; 11,044	15–24
40	January 15	Indiana	L 99–104	Jarrett Culver (17)	Gorgui Dieng (11)	Shabazz Napier (9)	Target Center; 12,648	15–25
41	January 17	@ Indiana	L 114–116	Karl-Anthony Towns (27)	Robert Covington (10)	Shabazz Napier (9)	Bankers Life Fieldhouse; 16,248	15–26
42	January 18	Toronto	L 112–122	Jarrett Culver (26)	Andrew Wiggins (10)	Andrew Wiggins (11)	Target Center; 16,520	15–27
43	January 20	Denver	L 100–107	Karl-Anthony Towns (28)	Towns, Okogie (8)	Shabazz Napier (8)	Target Center; 12,172	15–28
44	January 22	@ Chicago	L 110–117	Karl-Anthony Towns (40)	Covington, Dieng, Napier (7)	Andrew Wiggins (9)	United Center; 18,875	15–29
45	January 24	Houston	L 124–131	Karl-Anthony Towns (30)	Karl-Anthony Towns (12)	Keita Bates-Diop (6)	Target Center; 16,101	15–30
46	January 25	Oklahoma City	L 104–113	Karl-Anthony Towns (37)	Shabazz Napier (10)	Shabazz Napier (13)	Target Center; 16,236	15–31
47	January 27	Sacramento	L 129–133 (OT)	Andrew Wiggins (36)	Andrew Wiggins (9)	Napier, Wiggins (8)	Target Center; 13,449	15–32

February : 2–9 (home: 1–3; road: 1–6)

Game	Date	Team	Score	High points	High rebounds	High assists	Location Attendance	Record
48	February 1	@ L. A. Clippers	L 106–118	Karl-Anthony Towns (32)	Karl-Anthony Towns (12)	Shabazz Napier (10)	Staples Center; 19,068	15–33
49	February 3	@ Sacramento	L 109–113	Karl-Anthony Towns (22)	Karl-Anthony Towns (10)	Shabazz Napier (7)	Golden 1 Center; 15,819	15–34
50	February 5	Atlanta	L 120–127	Andrew Wiggins (25)	Karl-Anthony Towns (11)	Jordan McLaughlin (7)	Target Center; 10,779	15–35
51	February 8	L. A. Clippers	W 142–115	Jordan McLaughlin (24)	Karl-Anthony Towns (13)	Jordan McLaughlin (11)	Target Center; 18,978	16–35
52	February 10	@ Toronto	L 126–137	Karl-Anthony Towns (23)	Karl-Anthony Towns (10)	Karl-Anthony Towns (7)	Scotiabank Arena; 19,800	16–36
53	February 12	Charlotte	L 108–115	Malik Beasley (28)	Juan Hernangómez (12)	D'Angelo Russell (11)	Target Center; 18,978	16–37
54	February 21	Boston	L 117–127	Malik Beasley (27)	Naz Reid (9)	D'Angelo Russell (13)	Target Center; 18,978	16–38
55	February 23	@ Denver	L 116–128	Kelan Martin (21)	Malik Beasley (8)	Jordan McLaughlin (10)	Pepsi Center; 19,626	16–39
56	February 24	@ Dallas	L 123–139	D'Angelo Russell (29)	Culver, Martin (6)	D'Angelo Russell (5)	American Airlines Center; 19,936	16–40
57	February 26	@ Miami	W 129–126	D'Angelo Russell (27)	Malik Beasley (6)	D'Angelo Russell (6)	American Airlines Arena; 19,600	17–40
58	February 28	@ Orlando	L 125–136	D'Angelo Russell (28)	Juan Hernangómez (13)	D'Angelo Russell (7)	Amway Center; 18,846	17–41

March: 2–4 (home: 1–3; road: 1–1)

Game	Date	Team	Score	High points	High rebounds	High assists	Location Attendance	Record
59	March 1	Dallas	L 91–111	D'Angelo Russell (16)	Hernangómez, Reid (12)	D'Angelo Russell (7)	Target Center; 18,058	17–42
60	March 3	@ New Orleans	W 139–134	Malik Beasley (28)	Naz Reid (14)	D'Angelo Russell (8)	Smoothie King Center; 15,264	18–42
61	March 4	Chicago	W 115–108	Malik Beasley (24)	Naz Reid (11)	Jordan McLaughlin (7)	Target Center; 13,392	19–42
62	March 6	Orlando	L 118–132	Malik Beasley (29)	Juan Hernangómez (8)	Jordan McLaughlin (9)	Target Center; 14,315	19–43
63	March 8	New Orleans	L 107–120	Malik Beasley (21)	Malik Beasley (9)	D'Angelo Russell (5)	Target Center; 18,978	19–44
64	March 10	@ Houston	L 111–117	D'Angelo Russell (28)	Juan Hernangómez (10)	D'Angelo Russell (5)	Toyota Center; 18,055	19–45

Cancelled games

Game	Date	Team	Score	High points	High rebounds	High assists	Location Attendance	Record
65	March 13	@ Oklahoma City					Chesapeake Energy Arena	
66	March 14	@ San Antonio					AT&T Center	
67	March 17	@ Portland					Moda Center	
68	March 18	@ Phoenix					Talking Stick Resort Arena	
69	March 20	@ Utah					Vivint Smart Home Arena	
70	March 22	Portland					Target Center	
71	March 24	Philadelphia					Target Center	
72	March 26	San Antonio					Target Center	
73	March 29	@ Boston					TD Garden	
74	March 30	LA Lakers					Target Center	
75	April 1	Dallas					Target Center	
76	April 3	@ New York					Madison Square Garden	
77	April 5	Detroit					Target Center	
78	April 7	Phoenix					Target Center	
79	April 9	Sacramento					Target Center	
80	April 12	@ LA Lakers					Staples Center	
81	April 13	@ LA Clippers					Staples Center	
82	April 15	New York					Target Center	

2019–20 season schedule

== Player statistics ==
=== Regular season ===
Player	POS	GP	GS	MP	REB	AST	STL	BLK	PTS	MPG	RPG	APG	SPG	BPG	PPG
Jarrett Culver	SG	63	35	1,506	212	110	57	38	580	23.9	3.4	1.7	.9	.6	9.2
Josh Okogie	SG	62	28	1,547	268	99	68	26	533	25.0	4.3	1.6	1.1	.4	8.6
Robert Covington^{†}	PF	48	47	1,411	287	56	80	45	615	29.4	6.0	1.2	1.7	.9	12.8
Gorgui Dieng^{†}	C	46	17	778	256	58	37	42	341	16.9	5.6	1.3	.8	.9	7.4
Andrew Wiggins^{†}	SF	42	42	1,455	219	155	29	36	942	34.6	5.2	3.7	.7	.9	22.4
Keita Bates-Diop^{†}	PF	37	0	646	110	30	17	20	251	17.5	3.0	.8	.5	.5	6.8
Shabazz Napier^{†}	PG	36	22	856	110	187	40	7	347	23.8	3.1	5.2	1.1	.2	9.6
Karl-Anthony Towns	C	35	35	1,187	378	153	33	42	926	33.9	10.8	4.4	.9	1.2	26.5
Jeff Teague^{†}	PG	34	13	945	88	208	25	13	448	27.8	2.6	6.1	.7	.4	13.2
Treveon Graham^{†}	SF	33	20	663	100	30	17	2	171	20.1	3.0	.9	.5	.1	5.2
Kelan Martin	SF	31	4	495	96	23	7	9	197	16.0	3.1	.7	.2	.3	6.4
Naz Reid	C	30	11	495	124	35	19	22	269	16.5	4.1	1.2	.6	.7	9.0
Jordan McLaughlin	PG	30	2	590	49	125	34	4	229	19.7	1.6	4.2	1.1	.1	7.6
Noah Vonleh^{†}	C	29	1	347	116	26	11	6	119	12.0	4.0	.9	.4	.2	4.1
Jordan Bell^{†}	C	27	0	235	78	14	2	10	83	8.7	2.9	.5	.1	.4	3.1
Jake Layman	SF	23	2	505	57	15	17	10	210	22.0	2.5	.7	.7	.4	9.1
Jaylen Nowell	SG	15	0	151	13	19	3	1	57	10.1	.9	1.3	.2	.1	3.8
Malik Beasley^{†}	SG	14	14	463	71	27	9	2	290	33.1	5.1	1.9	.6	.1	20.7
Juancho Hernangómez^{†}	PF	14	14	411	102	18	14	4	181	29.4	7.3	1.3	1.0	.3	12.9
James Johnson^{†}	C	14	1	338	66	53	19	19	168	24.1	4.7	3.8	1.4	1.4	12.0
D'Angelo Russell^{†}	PG	12	12	392	55	79	17	4	260	32.7	4.6	6.6	1.4	.3	21.7
Allen Crabbe^{†}	SF	9	0	131	12	5	0	0	29	14.6	1.3	.6	.0	.0	3.2
Jarred Vanderbilt^{†}	PF	2	0	5	1	0	0	0	2	2.5	.5	.0	.0	.0	1.0
Jacob Evans^{†}	SG	2	0	4	0	0	0	0	0	2.0	.0	.0	.0	.0	.0

- ^{†} Denotes player spent time with another team in the season. Stats reflect time with the Timberwolves only.

== Transactions ==
=== Trades ===
July
July 6	To Minnesota Timberwolves: Draft rights to Jarrett Culver (#6)	To Phoenix Suns: Dario Šarić; Draft rights to Cameron Johnson (#11)
July 8	To Minnesota Timberwolves: Jake Layman (sign and trade)	To Portland Trail Blazers: Draft rights to Bojan Dubljević (2013 #59)
July 8	To Minnesota Timberwolves: Treveon Graham; Shabazz Napier; Cash considerations	To Golden State Warriors: Draft rights to Lior Eliyahu (2006 #44)
January
January 16	To Minnesota Timberwolves: Allen Crabbe	To Atlanta Hawks: Jeff Teague; Treveon Graham
February
February 5	Four-team trade	
February 5	To Minnesota Timberwolves: Malik Beasley (from Denver); Juan Hernangómez (from Denver); Jarred Vanderbilt (from Denver); Evan Turner (from Atlanta); 2020 BKN protected first-round pick (Note: Minnesota will receive the pick if it's #15-30, else it will roll over with the same protection through 2022; if the first-round pick isn't conveyed, Minnesota will receive Brooklyn's 2022 and 2024 second-round picks.)	To Atlanta Hawks: Clint Capela (from Houston); Nenê (from Houston)
February 5	To Denver Nuggets: Keita Bates-Diop (from Minnesota); Shabazz Napier (from Minnesota); Noah Vonleh (from Minnesota); Gerald Green (from Houston); 2020 HOU first-round pick	To Houston Rockets: Robert Covington (from Minnesota); Jordan Bell (from Minnesota); 2024 GSW second-round pick
February 6	To Minnesota Timberwolves: D'Angelo Russell; Omari Spellman; Jacob Evans	To Golden State Warriors: Andrew Wiggins; 2021 MIN protected first-round pick (Note: Golden State will receive the pick if it's #4-30, else they will receive Minnesota's first-round pick in 2022); 2021 MIN second-round pick
February 6	Three-team trade	
February 6	To Miami Heat: Andre Iguodala (from Memphis); Jae Crowder (from Memphis); Solomon Hill (from Memphis)	To Memphis Grizzlies: Justise Winslow (from Miami); Dion Waiters (from Miami); Gorgui Dieng (from Minnesota)
February 6	To Minnesota Timberwolves: James Johnson (from Miami)	

=== Free agents ===
==== Re-signed ====
Player	Signed

==== Additions ====
Player	Signed	Former Team

==== Subtractions ====
Player	Reason Left	New Team
