= 2019–20 Phoenix Suns season =

52nd season of an NBA franchise

- Head coach: Monty Williams
- General manager: James Jones
- Owners: Robert Sarver
- Arena: Talking Stick Resort Arena (before season suspension); ESPN Wide World of Sports Complex (after season suspension; closed off to the public)

Results
- Record: 34–39 (.466)
- Place: Division: 3rd (Pacific); Conference: 10th (Western)
- Playoff finish: Did not qualify
- Stats at Basketball Reference

Local media
- Television: Fox Sports Arizona
- Radio: KTAR

The 2019–20 Phoenix Suns season was their 52nd season of the franchise in the National Basketball Association (NBA), as well as their 27th season at the Talking Stick Resort Arena, later being considered the last season playing under that name. At the conclusion of their previous season, the Suns made James Jones the team's permanent general manager, with co-interim general manager Trevor Bukstein returning to his prior assistant general manager role. With a 19–63 season over, their entire coaching staff, including head coach Igor Kokoškov, was dismissed on April 23, 2019. After a quick head coaching search, the Suns hired former New Orleans Hornets/Pelicans head coach and Philadelphia 76ers assistant coach Monty Williams as the team's new head coach on May 3, later completing their new coaching staff on June 26. After the first seven games, despite an early 25-game long suspension to star center Deandre Ayton, the Suns had their best start to a season since the 2013–14 season, and best point differential since the 2004–05 season.

The season was suspended by the league officials following the games completed on March 11 after it was reported that Rudy Gobert (and a referee by proxy) tested positive for COVID-19. During that time, the Suns put up their best record in the last five seasons at 26–39. The suspension continued all the way until July 30, with the NBA agreeing to reopen the league under a modified system behind closed doors for the best 22 teams (including the Suns) this season through a 29–1 majority vote by the NBA and a unanimous vote by the NBPA. The Suns had a shot to advance to the playoffs for the first time since the 2009-10 NBA season by reaching the Western Conference's 8th seed via this season's play-in tournament as a Seed 9 and winning the tournament there. However, their chances before that point were hurt with not only Kelly Oubre Jr. announcing he would no longer play for the rest of the season, but two other Suns players (later revealed to be Aron Baynes and Ricky Rubio, though it eventually turned into four or five different players) later confirmed to test positive for COVID-19 before the season resumed. Despite playing without key players Kelly Oubre Jr. and Aron Baynes in the resumed season, the Suns won all 8 games in the 2020 NBA Bubble, not only being the only undefeated team in the NBA bubble, but also reaching the 30-win barrier for the first time since the 2014–15 season. Still, despite them going undefeated there (having their best winning streak to end a season ever at 8 wins in a row), they would miss the playoffs for a decade straight due to the Memphis Grizzlies having the tiebreaker over Phoenix after beating the Oklahoma City Thunder and Milwaukee Bucks there, as well as the Portland Trail Blazers barely making it as the new Seed 8 of the play-in tournament, winning 134–133 over the Brooklyn Nets.

This was the last time until 2025 that the Suns would miss the playoffs.

== Off-season ==
=== Front office changes ===
After the conclusion of the team's prior season, the Suns named James Jones their permanent general manager after serving as a coinciding interim general manager with Trevor Bukstein during the previous season. Bukstein was moved back to his original assistant general manager role by that time, while Jeff Bower became the senior vice president of basketball operations. On April 30, 2019, the Suns announced the departure of long-standing athletic trainer and senior vice president of athlete health and performance Aaron Nelson. Nelson left the Suns to be the new head athletic trainer for the New Orleans Pelicans, reuniting with David Griffin and Alvin Gentry there. Starting with this season, Nelson's position was replaced by a newly created sports medicine and performance team. The position was headlined by Brady Howe as the senior director of player health and performance, with David Crewe being the director of medical services and head athletic trainer.

During the regular season, Arizona Cardinals wide receiver Larry Fitzgerald also joined the front office as a partial owner, business and basketball adviser for the Suns, as well as a player adviser for both the Suns and Phoenix Mercury on January 22, 2020. On July 31, days after the Phoenix Suns announced the sale of their NBA G League affiliate Northern Arizona Suns franchise to the Detroit Pistons (with this season also inadvertently being their last season with the Northern Arizona Suns G League affiliate team), the Phoenix Suns franchise also confirmed that around 30 different employees involved with the franchise were laid off for varying reasons. Those reasons for their layoffs ranged from being redundant to being outdated to impacting the franchise's performance as a whole. The timing of their layoffs were also considered not related to any of the renovations for the Talking Stick Resort Arena, any plans for building their new practice facility nearby the arena, or even the impact that the COVID-19 pandemic caused upon the world.

=== Coaching changes ===
On April 22, 2019, the Suns fired head coach Igor Kokoškov after only one season with the team, despite giving him a three-year deal, later firing the rest of the coaching staff the following day. After this period, the Suns interviewed former New Orleans Hornets/Pelicans head coach and Philadelphia 76ers assistant coach Monty Williams and Portland Trail Blazers assistant coaches Nate Tibbetts and David Vanterpool. Monty Williams agreed to a five-year deal to coach the Suns on May 3, which became effective on May 12 at the conclusion of the 76ers' playoff run against the eventual 2019 NBA Finals champions, the Toronto Raptors. After a lengthy interviewing process with multiple assistant coach candidates, the Suns announced their new coaching staff on June 26, with Willie Green of the Golden State Warriors, Darko Rajaković and Mark Bryant of the Oklahoma City Thunder, Brooklyn Nets scout Randy Ayers, Larry Greer of the Minnesota Timberwolves, and Portland Trail Blazers on-court assistant Steve Blake being named assistant coaches; Gonzaga University's director of analysis Riccardo Fois and Philadelphia 76ers player development specialist Ben Strong were also named player development coaches.

On July 16, 2020, during the team's stay in Orlando, Florida for the resumed season, the Suns released an updated coaching staff for the franchise during not just the rest of this season, but also intended for entering their next season as well. In this updated coaching staff, the Suns confirmed the official firings of both Steve Blake and Larry Greer from the team. Both coaches were laid off sometime between June 1, the time where the NBA's coaches made their stand on the murder of George Floyd, and July 7, the beginning of their official trip out to Orlando for the rest of their season. Furthermore, the Suns also announced the promotion of Riccardo Fois to being the director of player development, as well as the hiring of both Ryan Frazier as head video coordinator and former Austin Spurs and San Antonio Spurs assistant coach William Donovan III as the assistant video coordinator. Despite the sudden change before the restart, the Suns still finished their restart with a perfect run in the resumed season.

=== Draft ===
Round	Pick	Player	Position(s)	Nationality	College / Club
1	6	Jarrett Culver	Shooting Guard	United States	Texas Tech
2	32	KZ Okpala	Small Forward	United States	Stanford

Entering the night of the 2019 NBA draft, the Suns held just one first-round pick and one second-round pick. With the new lottery projections, the Suns were one of three teams with the best overall odds for a top-4 pick alongside the New York Knicks and Cleveland Cavaliers. Due to them having a tied record with the Cavaliers at the end of last season, a tiebreaker coin-flip to determine which team acquired the second-best odds for a top pick in the draft was held. The Suns lost the tiebreaker, resulting in them getting the third-best odds at #1 with a chance to fall as far back as pick #7. The tiebreaker also flipped for the second-round picks; Phoenix received the #32 pick while the Philadelphia 76ers via Cleveland received the #33 pick. At the night of the draft lottery, the Suns fell to #6, the furthest a team with the third-best odds had fallen in the NBA draft lottery as of this season, as well as the worst drop-off a team with less than 20 wins received after a season. Phoenix also held a chance to acquire the Milwaukee Bucks' first-round pick the prior season, though it would not be acquired via the Bucks having the best regular-season record that season.

On draft night, the Suns agreed to three separate trades, each involving different teams, which were all made official on July 6, 2019. The first trade involved trading small forward T. J. Warren to the Indiana Pacers and their second-round pick of the draft (which became small forward KZ Okpala of Stanford University) to the Miami Heat for cash considerations from Indiana for the purpose of opening up their salary cap in free agency. Their second trade had the Suns trade the 6th pick of the draft (which became shooting guard Jarrett Culver from Texas Tech University) to the Minnesota Timberwolves in exchange for power forward Dario Šarić and Minnesota's own first-round pick at #11. That selection became forward Cameron Johnson from the University of North Carolina, who became an All-ACC First Team member in the 2018–19 season. Johnson later became an efficient bench player for most of the season before performing as a capable starting power forward in the 2020 NBA Bubble, later becoming a key member for their improbable 2021 NBA Finals run. With their final trade, the Suns agreed to trade away the Milwaukee Bucks' future first-round pick (which was the 30th pick of next season's draft) to the Boston Celtics in exchange for center Aron Baynes and the 24th pick of the draft (which was earlier owned by the Philadelphia 76ers), point guard Ty Jerome from the University of Virginia. Jerome was an All-ACC Third Team member in 2018 before being an All-ACC Second Team member in 2019 and winning the 2019 NCAA tournament with Virginia. They also agreed to a partially guaranteed deal with Brewster Academy postgraduate student Jalen Lecque after the draft as an undrafted player, signing his deal alongside the other rookies on July 6, 2019.

=== Free agency ===
For this season, free agency began on June 30, 2019, at 6:00 P.M. EST instead of the previously typical July 1 at midnight EST period. Players Dragan Bender (through being declined his fourth-year team option), Jamal Crawford, Troy Daniels, and Richaun Holmes all became unrestricted free agents as of the end of the 2018–19 NBA season, while Kelly Oubre Jr. became a restricted free agent. In addition, both Jimmer Fredette and Ray Spalding held non-guaranteed second seasons with the team, while Tyler Johnson held a player option for this season. Tyler Johnson exercised his player option on June 21, while Jimmer Fredette and Ray Spalding were not guaranteed a second year with the team on June 24 and 29, respectively, though Spalding still played with the Suns during the 2019 NBA Summer League, while Fredette played for the Golden State Warriors there. George King also had a two-way contract that expired this season, though he played for the Utah Jazz's Summer League team instead.

On June 30, Utah Jazz point guard Ricky Rubio agreed to a three-year deal worth $51 million to become the Suns' newest starting point guard, which was signed on July 8. The next day, both Troy Daniels and Richaun Holmes agreed to new deals to join the Los Angeles Lakers and Sacramento Kings, respectively. Charlotte Hornets power forward/center Frank Kaminsky III also agreed to a two-year deal worth $10 million later that day, which was later signed on July 17. On July 3, the Suns agreed to trade Josh Jackson, De'Anthony Melton, and two second-round picks to the Memphis Grizzlies for guards Kyle Korver and Jevon Carter, with Korver being waived on July 8. On July 6, the Suns signed undrafted Brewster Academy point guard Jalen Lecque to a partially guaranteed four-year deal (first two seasons fully guaranteed). Four days later, Kelly Oubre Jr. agreed to a two-year extension worth $30 million to return with the team, which he signed on July 16. On July 15, Jimmer Fredette signed with the Panathinaikos B.C. in Greece. The next day (which was also Kelly Oubre Jr.'s signing day), the Suns agreed to a two-year, $3.5 million deal with former New Orleans Pelicans power forward Cheick Diallo, which he signed on July 23, and a two-way contract spot with Auburn University point guard Jared Harper, which he signed on August 3. On July 21, George King signed a multi-year deal with the Dolomiti Energia Trento in Italy. Dragan Bender later agreed to a partially guaranteed two-year deal with the Milwaukee Bucks on July 25, officially signing with the Bucks on July 30. Ray Spalding also agreed to a non-guaranteed deal with the Atlanta Hawks a day later on July 31, though he was waived before the preseason even concluded on October 8, 2019. Spalding then signed with the Houston Rockets on October 10, 2019, before being waived after the preseason on the 19th and playing for the Rio Grande Valley Vipers in the NBA G League until he later signed a two-way contract with the Charlotte Hornets and Greensboro Swarm in early 2020. The only player that did not sign a new deal in the initial season was Jamal Crawford; he did not sign with any NBA team before the COVID-19 pandemic, but he did sign with the Brooklyn Nets inside the 2020 NBA Bubble out in Orlando as a replacement player for Spencer Dinwiddie on July 9, 2020, under their resumed season despite his signing being after the brief signing period of June 22-July 1, 2020. However, Crawford only played in one game for his 20th season in the NBA before getting injured and later being ruled out for the rest of the season.

On September 27, 2019, the Phoenix Suns announced the signing of Auburn point guard Jared Harper on a two-way contract, as well as the training camp signings of Texas Tech forwards Tariq Owens and Norense Odiase and Ratiopharm Ulm guard David Krämer, a born Slovak raised in Austria that competitively represents Germany. They later waived Owens, Odiase, and Krämer (the last of whom was injured during training camp) from the team after the conclusion of their preseason on October 15. The Suns also signed and waived forwards Aaron Epps and Troy Williams on October 19. Every player except for Williams later played for the Northern Arizona Suns afterward, with Troy playing for the U.S. Victoria Libertas Pallacanestro in Italy's Lega Basket Serie A. Owens eventually signed a two-way contract to return with the Phoenix Suns properly on January 15, 2020. After failing to find a deal for Tyler Johnson during the trade deadline, he was waived from the team on February 10. Johnson was later replaced by former Philadelphia 76ers power forward Jonah Bolden on a 10-day contract two days later. However, Bolden was not renewed for another 10-day contract by February 24 and did not sign with another team during this season, either before or after COVID-19 suspended this season. During the 2019–20 NBA season suspension caused by the COVID-19 pandemic, the Suns waived Jared Harper's two-way contract on March 14, noting the eventual cancellation of the 2019–20 NBA G League season as a consideration for him. However, because his waiver was first announced on the day after the season was first suspended, his waiver was not regarded as official until June 23.

When the NBA announced their plans to resume the 2019–20 season, they opened up a brief period from June 22 to July 1, 2020, where teams can expand their rosters to 17 players properly (meaning two-way contracts would play in the 2020 Playoffs due to the aftermath of this season's suspension) if they don't already have enough players to play with during their stay in Orlando, though even teams that aren't competing in Orlando will be able to make similar moves as well. Players signing in the resumed season for this period will only receive either short-term deals for the rest of the season, two-year deals with a minimum salary of 20/177th the value of the veteran's minimum for this season, or a two-way contract if eligible, with teams also eligible to waive players during that time, if necessary. With Tyler Johnson waived after the trade deadline and not yet permanently replaced by Phoenix at the time combined with Jared Harper being waived on June 23 officially, the Suns had a chance to fill up both a regular open spot and an open two-way contract spot for the 2020 NBA Bubble. (Kelly Oubre Jr. was not eligible for replacement due to him being considered out via injury with a chance to recover in time.) While it was reported that the Suns had two of their own players (which were revealed to be Aron Baynes & Ricky Rubio, with later reports expanding the amount to four or five total) tested positive for COVID-19, which made them eligible for substitute players for this season (initially players with 0–3 seasons of NBA experience before later including veteran players as well), these players were ultimately not seriously affected for the resumed season to warrant such players due to them being discovered early in that period of time and were later able to travel to Orlando before the start of the season. On June 30, 2020, the Suns signed point guard Cameron Payne, who last played for the Texas Legends in the NBA G League earlier this season, to a partially (later fully) guaranteed two-year deal worth a total of $2,173,299, with this season's guarantee of $196,288 for the Orlando period being the total veteran's minimum for his fourth season in the NBA for that section of the season. He was the only contract signed for the Suns during that period, opting not to fill up their other two-way contract spot. Tariq Owens, their only remaining two-way contract left for the season, was later confirmed to not join the Suns in Orlando for July & August as well, though he was out for his own personal reasons. None of the 22 teams in the 2020 NBA Bubble required any further substitute players once this season resumed on July 30, 2020.

== Roster ==
2019–20 Phoenix Suns roster
Players

Pos.	No.	Player	Height	Weight	DOB	From
C	22	Deandre Ayton	7 ft 1 in (2.16 m)	250 lb (113 kg)	1998–07–23	Arizona
C	46	Aron Baynes	6 ft 10 in (2.08 m)	260 lb (118 kg)	1986–12–09	Washington State
SG	1	Devin Booker	6 ft 5 in (1.96 m)	206 lb (93 kg)	1996–10–30	Kentucky
SF	25	Mikal Bridges	6 ft 6 in (1.98 m)	209 lb (95 kg)	1996–08–30	Villanova
PG	4	Jevon Carter	6 ft 1 in (1.85 m)	200 lb (91 kg)	1995–09–14	West Virginia
PF	14	Cheick Diallo	6 ft 9 in (2.06 m)	220 lb (100 kg)	1996–09–13	Kansas
SG	10	Ty Jerome	6 ft 5 in (1.96 m)	195 lb (88 kg)	1997–07–08	Virginia
SF	23	Cameron Johnson	6 ft 9 in (2.06 m)	210 lb (95 kg)	1996–03–03	North Carolina
PF/C	8	Frank Kaminsky	7 ft 0 in (2.13 m)	240 lb (109 kg)	1993–04–04	Wisconsin
PG	0	Jalen Lecque	6 ft 4 in (1.93 m)	185 lb (84 kg)	2000–06–13	Brewster Academy (NH)
PG	2	Élie Okobo	6 ft 3 in (1.91 m)	190 lb (86 kg)	1997–10–23	France
SF	3	Kelly Oubre	6 ft 7 in (2.01 m)	203 lb (92 kg)	1995–12–09	Kansas
PF	41	Tariq Owens (TW)	6 ft 10 in (2.08 m)	205 lb (93 kg)	1995–06–30	Texas Tech
PG	15	Cameron Payne (SP)	6 ft 1 in (1.85 m)	183 lb (83 kg)	1994–08–08	Murray State
PG	11	Ricky Rubio	6 ft 3 in (1.91 m)	190 lb (86 kg)	1990–10–21	Spain
PF	20	Dario Šarić	6 ft 11 in (2.11 m)	225 lb (102 kg)	1994–04–08	Croatia

Coaches
Head coach
- Monty Williams
Assistant(s)
- Randy Ayers
- Mark Bryant
- Willie Green
- Darko Rajaković
- Riccardo Fois (player development)
- Ben Strong (player development)

Legend
- (DP) Unsigned draft pick
- (FA) Free agent
- (S) Suspended
- (GL) On assignment to G League affiliate
- (TW) Two-way affiliate player
- (SP) Substitute player
- Injured

Roster
Updated: 2020–08–13

== Preseason ==
The preseason schedule was announced on July 29, 2019. Their preseason schedule was the second-shortest preseason in franchise history, behind the lockout shortened 2011–12 season. All home games played under this time were only viewed locally through the team's official website with recording done via Livestream.com, while road games were only available online outside of the team's area, similar to their last few preseasons. However, all games were heard through local radio stations as an alternative. The Suns ended their preseason with a 2–2 record.

2019 preseason game log
Total: 2–2 (Home: 1–1; Road: 1–1)
Preseason: 2–2 (home: 1–1; road: 1–1)

Game	Date	Team	Score	High points	High rebounds	High assists	Location Attendance	Record
1	October 8	Minnesota	W 111–106	Deandre Ayton (18)	Deandre Ayton (13)	Devin Booker, Ricky Rubio (5)	Talking Stick Resort Arena; 7,593	1–0
2	October 10	@ Sacramento	L 88–105	Devin Booker (18)	Devin Booker (7)	Ty Jerome (4)	Golden 1 Center; 15,385	1–1
3	October 12	@ Portland	W 134–118	Kelly Oubre Jr. (19)	Dario Šarić (8)	Frank Kaminsky III (8)	Moda Center; 18,468	2–1
4	October 14	Denver	L 102–107	Frank Kaminsky III (22)	Frank Kaminsky III (6)	Ricky Rubio (9)	Talking Stick Resort Arena; 8,075	2–2

2019–20 season schedule

=== Scrimmage games ===
On June 16, 2020, the NBA provided a six phase plan for each team competing at the ESPN Wide World of Sports Complex nearby Walt Disney World. For the fifth phase, the 22 teams left competing in Orlando played three scrimmage games behind closed doors against teams living in hotels nearby each other. For the Suns, they competed in games against other teams staying in Disney's Coronado Springs Resort for the month of July, which were the Utah Jazz, Boston Celtics, and the defending champion Toronto Raptors, all in different arenas hosting these teams at the complex. Unlike in the preseason, the three scrimmage games the Suns played in aired live on Fox Sports Arizona as well as local radio stations alongside the rest of the resumed games for the regular season. They also began wearing cloth face masks to protect themselves from catching COVID-19 for safety purposes. Each team's first game in the scrimmage had only 10-minute quarters for 40-minute games instead of the usual 12-minute quarters for 48 minute games due to a combination of easing players back into action and how teams like the Suns did not have everyone arrive initially on their respective dates. Their last game began the experiment of virtual fans seeing the game live due to the temporary setup for the complex under this period, which was to be used for the rest of the season. Phoenix finished their scrimmage games with a 2–1 record, winning their 40-minute game against the Utah Jazz, but losing to Boston and winning against Toronto in their regular, 48-minute matches.

2020 preseason game log
Total: 2–1 (Home: 1–0; Road: 1–1)
Scrimmages: 2–1 (home: 1–0; road: 1–1)

Game	Date	Team	Score	High points	High rebounds	High assists	Location Attendance	Record
1	July 23	@ Utah	W 101–88	Mikal Bridges (14)	Deandre Ayton (8)	Devin Booker, Ty Jerome, Frank Kaminsky III (3)	HP Field House; Closed off arena	1–0
2	July 26	@ Boston	L 103–117	Devin Booker (17)	Dario Šarić (8)	Devin Booker (9)	Visa Athletic Center; Closed off arena	1–1
3	July 28	Toronto	W 117–106	Mikal Bridges (26)	Deandre Ayton, Devin Booker, Frank Kaminsky III (6)	Devin Booker (7)	AdventHealth Arena; Closed off arena	2–1

2019–20 season schedule

== Regular season ==
On June 7, 2019, the NBA announced that the Suns would play against the San Antonio Spurs on December 14, 2019, at the Mexico City Arena in Mexico City. That game ended in an overtime loss to San Antonio. The NBA later announced the rest of the league's schedule on August 12. After the first game of the season, Deandre Ayton was suspended for 25 games due to diuretic usage. Despite that setback alongside multiple serious injuries to the team, under the original schedule, the Suns put up a 26–39 record for the season, which already was their best record in over five seasons.

On March 11, 2020, the NBA postponed the rest of the regular season, effective after the end of most of the league’s games played that night. This period left most of the regular season games scheduled throughout March and April in jeopardy of cancellation due to the long suspension. The Suns ended their initial season being six games out of the playoffs from that period, just barely qualifying for resumption. On June 4, the NBA agreed to resume the regular season for 22 teams, including the Suns, behind closed doors at the ESPN Wide World of Sports Complex in Orlando, Florida. Each team only received eight new regular season games for late July and early August before a play-in tournament began with the top two teams for Seed 8 being at least four games apart from each other before the already qualified teams went straight into the 2020 NBA playoffs. The NBA revealed every team’s remaining schedules on June 26, with the Suns having a shuffled period of the initial 8 games they originally had against bubble qualified teams from March 14-April 1, 2020 rescheduled for July 31-August 13, 2020.

Every scheduled game the Suns played in the 2020 NBA Bubble (including their game against the Los Angeles Clippers that aired on NBA TV, as well as the last regular season game against the Dallas Mavericks that aired early on TNT, both held at the AdventHealth Arena in the designated bubble area) still aired on Fox Sports Arizona, though their entire broadcasting crew was working remotely in Arizona during these games. The team also started wearing special cloth face masks during the remaining games played this season, as well as wore "Black Lives Matter" t-shirts before games and kneeling down for the national anthem. Every game these 22 teams competed in during this stretch counted for their overall regular season records. They also provided a potential jump up with playoff and draft placements in the 2020 NBA draft in the event the Suns made it to the playoffs properly, though they would not count for any potential impact in the NBA draft lottery for that upcoming draft. With their resumed season, the Suns managed to get a perfect 8–0 return in the 2020 NBA Bubble to end their regular season at 34–39. However, they did not reach the play-in tournament due to the Portland Trail Blazers having a better record and the Memphis Grizzlies having the tiebreaker over Phoenix this season.

=== Game log ===
2019–20 game log
Total: 34–39 (Home: 17–22; Road: 17–17)
October: 3–2 (home: 2–1; road: 1–1)

Game	Date	Team	Score	High points	High rebounds	High assists	Location Attendance	Record
1	October 23	Sacramento	W 124–95	Devin Booker (22)	Deandre Ayton (11)	Ricky Rubio (11)	Talking Stick Resort Arena; 18,055	1–0
2	October 25	@ Denver	L 107–108 (OT)	Kelly Oubre Jr. (23)	Frank Kaminsky III (11)	Ricky Rubio (9)	Pepsi Center; 19,557	1–1
3	October 26	L. A. Clippers	W 130–122	Devin Booker (30)	Dario Šarić (10)	Devin Booker (8)	Talking Stick Resort Arena; 15,802	2–1
4	October 28	Utah	L 95–96	Devin Booker (21)	Ricky Rubio (10)	Ricky Rubio (8)	Talking Stick Resort Arena; 14,805	2–2
5	October 30	@ Golden State	W 121–110	Aron Baynes (24)	Aron Baynes (12)	Aron Baynes, Ricky Rubio (7)	Chase Center; 18,064	3–2

November : 5–8 (home: 3–6; road: 2–2)

Game	Date	Team	Score	High points	High rebounds	High assists	Location Attendance	Record
6	November 2	@ Memphis	W 114–105	Devin Booker (21)	Dario Šarić (7)	Ricky Rubio (5)	FedExForum; 14,144	4–2
7	November 4	Philadelphia	W 114–109	Devin Booker (40)	Aron Baynes, Ricky Rubio (7)	Ricky Rubio (10)	Talking Stick Resort Arena; 14,285	5–2
8	November 7	Miami	L 108–124	Aron Baynes (23)	Ricky Rubio (11)	Ricky Rubio (6)	Talking Stick Resort Arena; 15,498	5–3
9	November 10	Brooklyn	W 138–112	Devin Booker (27)	Aron Baynes (7)	Ricky Rubio (12)	Talking Stick Resort Arena; 17,290	6–3
10	November 12	L. A. Lakers	L 115–123	Devin Booker, Ricky Rubio (21)	Frank Kaminsky III (9)	Ricky Rubio (10)	Talking Stick Resort Arena; 18,055	6–4
11	November 14	Atlanta	W 128–112	Kelly Oubre Jr. (30)	Kelly Oubre Jr. (7)	Ricky Rubio (8)	Talking Stick Resort Arena; 15,143	7–4
12	November 18	Boston	L 85–99	Devin Booker (20)	Dario Šarić (10)	Aron Baynes (5)	Talking Stick Resort Arena; 15,193	7–5
13	November 19	@ Sacramento	L 116–120	Devin Booker (30)	Kelly Oubre Jr. (8)	Devin Booker (8)	Golden 1 Center; 16,732	7–6
14	November 21	New Orleans	L 121–124	Kelly Oubre Jr. (25)	Mikal Bridges, Kelly Oubre Jr. (6)	Devin Booker, Élie Okobo (7)	Talking Stick Resort Arena; 13,903	7–7
15	November 23	@ Minnesota	W 100–98	Devin Booker (35)	Devin Booker (12)	Devin Booker (9)	Target Center; 17,362	8–7
16	November 24	@ Denver	L 104–116	Cheick Diallo (22)	Dario Šarić (17)	Devin Booker (5)	Pepsi Center; 19,520	8–8
17	November 27	Washington	L 132–140	Devin Booker (27)	Dario Šarić (12)	Devin Booker, Élie Okobo (8)	Talking Stick Resort Arena; 14,123	8–9
18	November 29	Dallas	L 113–120	Kelly Oubre Jr. (22)	Kelly Oubre Jr. (10)	Ricky Rubio (9)	Talking Stick Resort Arena; 18,055	8–10

December : 5–9 (home: 1–4; road: 4–5)

Game	Date	Team	Score	High points	High rebounds	High assists	Location Attendance	Record
19	December 2	@ Charlotte	W 109–104	Devin Booker, Kelly Oubre Jr. (23)	Dario Šarić (10)	Ricky Rubio (13)	Spectrum Center; 11,221	9–10
20	December 4	@ Orlando	L 114–128	Frank Kaminsky III (23)	Dario Šarić (6)	Ricky Rubio (9)	Amway Center; 15,176	9–11
21	December 5	@ New Orleans	W 139–132 (OT)	Devin Booker (44)	Kelly Oubre Jr. (15)	Ricky Rubio (15)	Smoothie King Center; 15,607	10–11
22	December 7	@ Houston	L 109–115	Devin Booker (35)	Dario Šarić (12)	Ricky Rubio (13)	Toyota Center; 18,055	10–12
23	December 9	Minnesota	W 125–109	Devin Booker (26)	Dario Šarić (9)	Ricky Rubio (14)	Talking Stick Resort Arena; 13,230	11–12
24	December 11	Memphis	L 108–115	Frank Kaminsky III (24)	Kelly Oubre Jr. (13)	Devin Booker (10)	Talking Stick Resort Arena; 12,254	11–13
25	December 14	San Antonio	L 119–121 (OT)	Ricky Rubio (25)	Dario Šarić (17)	Ricky Rubio (13)	Mexico City Arena (Mexico City); 20,013	11–14
26	December 16	Portland	L 110–111	Kelly Oubre Jr. (24)	Ricky Rubio (11)	Ricky Rubio (14)	Talking Stick Resort Arena; 14,193	11–15
27	December 17	@ L. A. Clippers	L 99–120	Kelly Oubre Jr. (19)	Deandre Ayton (12)	Ricky Rubio (8)	Staples Center; 19,068	11–16
28	December 20	@ Oklahoma City	L 108–126	Ricky Rubio (24)	Dario Šarić (6)	Ricky Rubio (8)	Chesapeake Energy Arena; 18,203	11–17
29	December 21	Houston	L 125–139	Kelly Oubre Jr. (26)	Devin Booker (6)	Devin Booker (9)	Talking Stick Resort Arena; 16,061	11–18
30	December 23	Denver	L 111–113	Ricky Rubio (21)	Ricky Rubio, Cameron Johnson (7)	Ricky Rubio (9)	Talking Stick Resort Arena; 16,041	11–19
31	December 27	@ Golden State	L 96–105	Devin Booker (34)	Aron Baynes, Dario Šarić (10)	Devin Booker, Ricky Rubio (4)	Chase Center; 18,064	11–20
32	December 28	@ Sacramento	W 112–110	Devin Booker (32)	Kelly Oubre Jr. (16)	Devin Booker (10)	Golden 1 Center; 17,583	12–20
33	December 30	@ Portland	W 122–116	Devin Booker (33)	Deandre Ayton (12)	Ricky Rubio (13)	Moda Center; 19,896	13–20

January : 7–8 (home: 3–5; road: 4–3)

Game	Date	Team	Score	High points	High rebounds	High assists	Location Attendance	Record
34	January 1	@ L. A. Lakers	L 107–117	Devin Booker (32)	Deandre Ayton (14)	Ricky Rubio (9)	Staples Center; 18,997	13–21
35	January 3	New York	W 120–112	Devin Booker (38)	Deandre Ayton (13)	Ricky Rubio (10)	Talking Stick Resort Arena; 18,055	14–21
36	January 5	Memphis	L 114–121	Devin Booker (40)	Deandre Ayton (12)	Ricky Rubio (8)	Talking Stick Resort Arena; 14,181	14–22
37	January 7	Sacramento	L 103–114	Devin Booker (34)	Deandre Ayton (9)	Ricky Rubio (9)	Talking Stick Resort Arena; 14,134	14–23
38	January 10	Orlando	W 98–94	Devin Booker (24)	Deandre Ayton, Kelly Oubre Jr. (9)	Ricky Rubio (10)	Talking Stick Resort Arena; 14,562	15–23
39	January 12	Charlotte	W 100–92	Kelly Oubre Jr. (25)	Kelly Oubre Jr. (15)	Devin Booker, Ricky Rubio (9)	Talking Stick Resort Arena; 14,751	16–23
40	January 14	@ Atlanta	L 110–123	Devin Booker (39)	Deandre Ayton (10)	Mikal Bridges (4)	State Farm Arena; 16,060	16–24
41	January 16	@ New York	W 121–98	Devin Booker (29)	Deandre Ayton (21)	Ricky Rubio (13)	Madison Square Garden; 18,215	17–24
42	January 18	@ Boston	W 123–119	Devin Booker (39)	Deandre Ayton (15)	Devin Booker, Ricky Rubio (9)	TD Garden; 19,156	18–24
43	January 20	San Antonio	L 118–120	Devin Booker (37)	Deandre Ayton (12)	Ricky Rubio (9)	Talking Stick Resort Arena; 14,847	18–25
44	January 22	Indiana	L 87–112	Kelly Oubre Jr. (17)	Kelly Oubre Jr. (9)	Devin Booker, Ricky Rubio, Élie Okobo (3)	Talking Stick Resort Arena; 14,691	18–26
45	January 24	@ San Antonio	W 103–99	Devin Booker (35)	Deandre Ayton (11)	Devin Booker (10)	AT&T Center; 18,354	19–26
46	January 26	@ Memphis	L 109–114	Devin Booker (36)	Deandre Ayton (15)	Devin Booker (5)	FedExForum; 17,214	19–27
47	January 28	@ Dallas	W 133–104	Devin Booker (32)	Deandre Ayton (9)	Devin Booker (9)	American Airlines Center; 20,216	20–27
48	January 31	Oklahoma City	L 107–111	Devin Booker, Kelly Oubre Jr. (27)	Kelly Oubre Jr. (11)	Ricky Rubio (7)	Talking Stick Resort Arena; 17,260	20–28

February : 4–9 (home: 2–4; road: 2–5)

Game	Date	Team	Score	High points	High rebounds	High assists	Location Attendance	Record
49	February 2	@ Milwaukee	L 108–129	Devin Booker (32)	Deandre Ayton (14)	Devin Booker (6)	Fiserv Forum; 17,754	20–29
50	February 3	@ Brooklyn	L 97–119	Deandre Ayton (25)	Deandre Ayton (17)	Deandre Ayton, Élie Okobo (5)	Barclays Center; 14,891	20–30
51	February 5	@ Detroit	L 108–116	Kelly Oubre Jr. (30)	Deandre Ayton (12)	Ricky Rubio (11)	Little Caesars Arena; 13,707	20–31
52	February 7	Houston	W 127–91	Kelly Oubre Jr. (39)	Devin Booker, Kelly Oubre Jr. (9)	Ricky Rubio (10)	Talking Stick Resort Arena; 17,043	21–31
53	February 8	Denver	L 108–117	Deandre Ayton (28)	Deandre Ayton (19)	Devin Booker (9)	Talking Stick Resort Arena; 16,843	21–32
54	February 10	@ L. A. Lakers	L 100–125	Mikal Bridges (18)	Mikal Bridges (6)	Devin Booker, Ricky Rubio (5)	Staples Center; 18,997	21–33
55	February 12	Golden State	W 112–106	Devin Booker (27)	Cheick Diallo (8)	Ricky Rubio (9)	Talking Stick Resort Arena; 15,216	22–33
All-Star Break
56	February 21	@ Toronto	L 101–118	Devin Booker (21)	Deandre Ayton (10)	Ricky Rubio (9)	Scotiabank Arena; 19,800	22–34
57	February 22	@ Chicago	W 112–104	Devin Booker (29)	Deandre Ayton (19)	Ricky Rubio (11)	United Center; 20,506	23–34
58	February 24	@ Utah	W 131–111	Devin Booker (24)	Aron Baynes (8)	Ricky Rubio (11)	Vivint Smart Home Arena; 18,306	24–34
59	February 26	L. A. Clippers	L 92–102	Deandre Ayton (25)	Deandre Ayton (17)	Devin Booker, Ricky Rubio (10)	Talking Stick Resort Arena; 15,157	24–35
60	February 28	Detroit	L 111–113	Devin Booker (26)	Deandre Ayton (10)	Ricky Rubio (13)	Talking Stick Resort Arena; 17,142	24–36
61	February 29	Golden State	L 99–115	Devin Booker (21)	Deandre Ayton, Dario Šarić (9)	Ricky Rubio (8)	Talking Stick Resort Arena; 16,395	24–37

March : 2–2 (home: 2–1; road: 0–1)

Game	Date	Team	Score	High points	High rebounds	High assists	Location Attendance	Record
62	March 3	Toronto	L 114–123	Devin Booker (22)	Deandre Ayton (14)	Devin Booker, Ricky Rubio (10)	Talking Stick Resort Arena; 15,553	24–38
63	March 6	Portland	W 127–117	Aron Baynes (37)	Aron Baynes (16)	Devin Booker (12)	Talking Stick Resort Arena; 15,522	25–38
64	March 8	Milwaukee	W 140–131	Devin Booker (36)	Ricky Rubio (13)	Ricky Rubio (13)	Talking Stick Resort Arena; 17,282	26–38
65	March 10	@ Portland	L 105–121	Devin Booker (29)	Dario Šarić (11)	Devin Booker, Ricky Rubio (9)	Moda Center; 19,393	26–39

Seeding games: 8–0 (home: 4–0; road: 4–0)

Game	Date	Team	Score	High points	High rebounds	High assists	Location Attendance	Record
66	July 31	@ Washington	W 125–112	Devin Booker (27)	Deandre Ayton (12)	Ricky Rubio (9)	Visa Athletic Center; No In-Person Attendance	27–39
67	August 2	Dallas	W 117–115	Devin Booker (32)	Cameron Johnson (12)	Ricky Rubio (7)	Visa Athletic Center; No In-Person Attendance	28–39
68	August 4	@ L. A. Clippers	W 117–115	Devin Booker (35)	Dario Šarić (8)	Devin Booker (8)	AdventHealth Arena; No In-Person Attendance	29–39
69	August 6	Indiana	W 114–99	Deandre Ayton (23)	Cameron Johnson (12)	Devin Booker (10)	Visa Athletic Center; No In-Person Attendance	30–39
70	August 8	@ Miami	W 119–112	Devin Booker (35)	Deandre Ayton (12)	Ricky Rubio (8)	Visa Athletic Center; No In-Person Attendance	31–39
71	August 10	Oklahoma City	W 128–101	Devin Booker (35)	Dario Šarić (9)	Ricky Rubio (9)	HP Field House; No In-Person Attendance	32–39
72	August 11	@ Philadelphia	W 130–117	Devin Booker (35)	Deandre Ayton (12)	Ricky Rubio (10)	Visa Athletic Center; No In-Person Attendance	33–39
73	August 13	Dallas	W 128–102	Devin Booker (27)	Deandre Ayton (9)	Ricky Rubio (12)	AdventHealth Arena; No In-Person Attendance	34–39

Cancelled games

Game	Date	Team	Score	High points	High rebounds	High assists	Location Attendance	Record
66	March 14	@ Dallas					American Airlines Center	
67	March 18	Minnesota					Talking Stick Resort Arena	
68	March 20	@ L.A. Clippers					Staples Center	
69	March 21	Dallas					Talking Stick Resort Arena	
70	March 23	@ Indiana					Bankers Life Fieldhouse	
71	March 25	@ Washington					Capital One Arena	
72	March 27	@ Philadelphia					Wells Fargo Center	
73	March 28	@ Miami					AmericanAirlines Arena	
74	March 30	@ Cleveland					Rocket Mortgage FieldHouse	
75	April 1	@ Oklahoma City					Chesapeake Energy Arena	
76	April 3	Cleveland					Talking Stick Resort Arena	
77	April 5	Chicago					Talking Stick Resort Arena	
78	April 7	@ Minnesota					Target Center	
79	April 9	@ New Orleans					Smoothie King Center	
80	April 11	Utah					Talking Stick Resort Arena	
81	April 13	@ Houston					Toyota Center	
82	April 15	L.A. Lakers					Talking Stick Resort Arena	

2019–20 season schedule

== Standings ==
Pacific Division	W	L	PCT	GB	Home	Road	Div	GP
c – Los Angeles Lakers	52	19	.732	–	25‍–‍10	27‍–‍9	10–3	71
x – Los Angeles Clippers	49	23	.681	3.5	27‍–‍9	22‍–‍14	8–6	72
Phoenix Suns	34	39	.466	19.0	17‍–‍22	17‍–‍17	6–9	73
Sacramento Kings	31	41	.431	21.5	16‍–‍19	15‍–‍22	8–5	72
Golden State Warriors	15	50	.231	34.0	8‍–‍26	7‍–‍24	2–11	65

Western Conference
#	Team	W	L	PCT	GB	GP
1	c – Los Angeles Lakers *	52	19	.732	–	71
2	x – Los Angeles Clippers	49	23	.681	3.5	72
3	y – Denver Nuggets *	46	27	.630	7.0	73
4	y – Houston Rockets *	44	28	.611	8.5	72
5	x – Oklahoma City Thunder	44	28	.611	8.5	72
6	x – Utah Jazz	44	28	.611	8.5	72
7	x – Dallas Mavericks	43	32	.573	11.0	75
8	x – Portland Trail Blazers	35	39	.473	18.5	74
9	pi – Memphis Grizzlies	34	39	.466	19.0	73
10	Phoenix Suns	34	39	.466	19.0	73
11	San Antonio Spurs	32	39	.451	20.0	71
12	Sacramento Kings	31	41	.431	21.5	72
13	New Orleans Pelicans	30	42	.417	22.5	72
14	Minnesota Timberwolves	19	45	.297	29.5	64
15	Golden State Warriors	15	50	.231	34.0	65

== Player statistics ==
=== Before season suspension ===
Legend
GP	Games played	GS	Games started	MPG	Minutes per game
FG%	Field-goal percentage	3P%	3-point field-goal percentage	FT%	Free-throw percentage
RPG	Rebounds per game	APG	Assists per game	SPG	Steals per game
BPG	Blocks per game	PPG	Points per game

Phoenix Suns statistics
Player	GP	GS	MPG	FG%	3P%	FT%	RPG	APG	SPG	BPG	PPG
Deandre Ayton	30	25	33.2	.548	.000	.769	12.0	1.9	0.7	1.7	19.0
Aron Baynes	42	28	22.2	.480	.351	.747	5.6	1.6	0.2	0.5	11.5
Jonah Bolden*	3	0	11.0	.250	.000	1.000	2.7	0.0	0.7	0.7	2.0
Devin Booker	62	62	36.1	.487	.360	.916	4.2	6.6	0.7	0.3	26.1
Mikal Bridges	65	24	27.3	.516	.352	.848	4.0	1.8	1.4	0.6	8.7
Jevon Carter	50	2	15.1	.400	.393	.840	2.0	1.3	0.8	0.3	4.6
Cheick Diallo	44	2	10.6	.650	.500	.865	2.9	0.5	0.2	0.3	4.8
Jared Harper	3	0	2.7	.250	.000	.000	0.0	0.0	0.0	0.0	0.7
Ty Jerome	28	0	11.3	.349	.277	.786	1.5	1.5	0.5	0.1	3.5
Cameron Johnson	49	1	20.3	.418	.397	.761	2.9	1.1	0.6	0.3	8.1
Tyler Johnson*	31	3	16.6	.380	.389	.750	1.7	1.6	0.4	0.3	5.7
Frank Kaminsky	32	13	22.4	.455	.348	.670	4.9	2.2	0.4	0.3	11.0
Jalen Lecque	4	0	6.5	.400	.000	1.000	0.0	0.5	0.0	0.0	2.5
Élie Okobo	54	3	13.1	.398	.352	.687	1.6	2.1	0.4	0.1	4.0
Kelly Oubre Jr.	56	55	34.5	.452	.352	.780	6.4	1.5	1.3	0.7	18.7
Tariq Owens	3	0	5.0	.200	.000	1.000	1.0	0.0	0.3	0.0	1.3
Ricky Rubio	57	57	31.6	.412	.351	.853	4.6	8.9	1.5	0.2	13.1
Dario Šarić	58	50	24.8	.462	.341	.832	5.9	1.9	0.6	0.3	10.1

* – Stats with the Suns.

=== After season suspension ===
Phoenix Suns statistics
Player	GP	GS	MPG	FG%	3P%	FT%	RPG	APG	SPG	BPG	PPG
Deandre Ayton	38	32	32.5	.546	.231	.753	11.5	1.9	0.7	1.5	18.2
Aron Baynes	42	28	22.2	.480	.351	.747	5.6	1.6	0.2	0.5	11.5
Jonah Bolden*	3	0	11.0	.250	.000	1.000	2.7	0.0	0.7	0.7	2.0
Devin Booker	70	70	35.9	.489	.354	.919	4.2	6.5	0.7	0.3	26.6
Mikal Bridges	73	32	28.0	.510	.361	.844	4.0	1.8	1.4	0.6	9.1
Jevon Carter	58	2	16.3	.416	.425	.852	2.0	1.4	0.8	0.3	4.9
Cheick Diallo	47	2	10.2	.648	.333	.872	2.8	0.5	0.2	0.3	4.7
Jared Harper	3	0	2.7	.250	.000	.000	0.0	0.0	0.0	0.0	0.7
Ty Jerome	31	0	10.6	.336	.280	.750	1.5	1.4	0.5	0.1	3.3
Cameron Johnson	57	9	22.0	.435	.390	.807	3.3	1.2	0.6	0.4	8.8
Tyler Johnson*	31	3	16.6	.380	.389	.750	1.7	1.6	0.4	0.3	5.7
Frank Kaminsky	39	13	19.9	.450	.331	.678	4.5	1.9	0.4	0.3	9.7
Jalen Lecque	5	0	6.3	.400	.000	1.000	0.4	0.4	0.0	0.0	2.0
Élie Okobo	55	3	13.1	.398	.352	.704	1.6	2.1	0.4	0.1	4.0
Kelly Oubre Jr.	56	55	34.5	.452	.352	.780	6.4	1.5	1.3	0.7	18.7
Tariq Owens	3	0	5.0	.200	.000	1.000	1.0	0.0	0.3	0.0	1.3
Cameron Payne**	8	0	22.9	.485	.517	.857	3.9	3.0	1.0	0.3	10.9
Ricky Rubio	65	65	31.0	.415	.361	.863	4.7	8.8	1.4	0.2	13.0
Dario Šarić	66	51	24.7	.476	.357	.844	6.2	1.9	0.6	0.2	10.7

** – Joined team for their resumed season in the 2020 NBA Bubble.

== Awards and records ==
- On September 6, 2019, former Suns player and coach Paul Westphal was inducted into the Naismith Basketball Hall of Fame as a player.

=== Awards ===
- Devin Booker wins the first ever "NBA 2K Players Tournament" over his teammate Deandre Ayton in a best of 3 finals series to become the "NBA 2K20 Players Champion". Booker donated his earnings to both Direct Relief and the Arizona Food Bank Network (which helps all food banks in the state of Arizona) to support relief amidst the COVID-19 pandemic.
- On August 15, 2020, Devin Booker won his first (technically speaking) All-NBA Team honors by being named one of only three unanimous members of the All-Seeding Games First Team, earning his spot with averages of 30.5 points, 4.9 rebounds, and 6 assists per game in the 2020 NBA Bubble. He was also named runner-up for the Seeding Games' MVP behind Damian Lillard.
- Monty Williams was named the Head Coach of the Seeding Games for having an undefeated record in the 2020 NBA Bubble, receiving nearly unanimous first place votes for the honor with their perfect 8–0 record there.

==== All-Star ====
- On January 30, 2020, Deandre Ayton was once again named a member of the World Team for the Rising Stars Challenge. However, due to a left ankle injury sustained on February 10, he abstained from playing in the event, being replaced by Nicolò Melli.
- On February 13, 2020, Devin Booker was named an All-Star for the first time in his career, replacing Damian Lillard for both the Three-Point Contest and the 2020 NBA All-Star Game as a member for Team LeBron.
  - Booker became the runner-up in the Three-Point Contest for 2020, coming behind Buddy Hield by tying him in the first round, but losing to him by one point in the final round. He also put up six points, four rebounds, and a block coming off the bench with 19 minutes played in Team LeBron's 157–155 win over Team Giannis.

=== Records ===
- From December 28, 2019, until January 7, 2020, Devin Booker joined James Harden, Russell Westbrook, LeBron James, and Tracy McGrady as the only players to put up 30+ points and 6+ assists in six straight games, dating back to the 1983–84 NBA season. He also became the only player to shoot at least 47% in each of those games.
- On January 28, 2020, Devin Booker became the youngest (shooting) guard to reach 7,000, breaking a record previously set by Kobe Bryant.
- On March 6, 2020, Aron Baynes became only the second player in league history to score 35+ points with 9 three-pointers made and grab 15+ rebounds in a single game, with the first player being James Harden.
- By the end of the regular season in August, this season's Suns team broke the 1989–90 Boston Celtics' record for highest free-throw percentage in a season at over 83.2% efficiency by shooting their free-throws at an 83.4% efficiency rate. However, the record can be considered one with an asterisk on it due to it not being completed under a full, 82 game schedule via the COVID-19 pandemic.

=== Team records ===
- On October 12, 2019, the Suns set a preseason record for most three-pointers made in a single game with 24 made in a win over the Portland Trail Blazers.
- On October 23, 2019, Ricky Rubio tied Elliot Perry as the only players to put up 11 assists in their Suns debut games.
- The 43–14 first quarter the Suns scored for a 29-point lead against the Golden State Warriors on October 30, 2019, became the team's largest lead by the end of a first quarter in franchise history, beating the 24-point lead held against the Utah Jazz back on January 5, 1994.
- On November 5, 2019, Devin Booker became the first player in franchise history to score at least fifteen field goals and 3 three-pointers while making 75% or more of his shot attempts in both areas.
- Throughout the team's first seven games of the season, the Suns scored 89 three-point field goals, breaking a team record set back in the 2009–10 season.
- From December 27, 2019, until January 7, 2020, Devin Booker set the franchise record of 7 consecutive 30+ point games, previously set (and then repeated) at 5 games by Charlie Scott and later tied by Charles Barkley.
- On February 8, 2020, Deandre Ayton became the quickest player in franchise history to reach 1,000 rebounds with 19 grabbed against the Denver Nuggets, getting to that mark in only 94 games played with Phoenix.
- On March 6, 2020, Aron Baynes tied former Suns players Quentin Richardson and Channing Frye for the franchise record of most three-pointers made in a single game.
- On August 6, 2020, Devin Booker became the quickest player in franchise history to reach 200 20-point games for the Suns, reaching that amount in 338 total games played with Phoenix. He reached the 20-point barrier with a three-point play at 4:32 in the fourth quarter in a 114–99 win against the Indiana Pacers as the home team. He also became the sixth youngest player in league history to reach that mark and the fastest Suns player to get 200 20+ point games.
- On August 8, 2020, Cameron Johnson broke a record previously set by Wesley Person for the fastest player to reach 100 three-pointers made in franchise history. He would score a three-pointer in the first quarter that day before ending the night with one more for 101 three-pointers this season in a 119–112 win over the Miami Heat as the road team, breaking Wesley Person's record of 72 games in only 54 games played.
- On August 10, 2020, Devin Booker tied a record previously set by Walter Davis for the most games of 30+ points scored for the Suns with 35 points in a blowout 128–101 win over the Oklahoma City Thunder as the home team.
  - A day later, Devin Booker broke the record with another 35-point romp for a 130–117 win over the Philadelphia 76ers as the road team.
- At the end of the season on August 13, Cameron Johnson held the overall pace to become the franchise's record holder for most three-pointers made in their rookie season with 106 total in the shortened season, being on pace to break Wesley Person's record of 116 there properly had the season not been interrupted.

=== Milestones ===
- On November 5, 2019, Devin Booker became the eighth-youngest player in NBA history to reach 6,000 points, behind LeBron James, Kevin Durant, Carmelo Anthony, Kobe Bryant, Tracy McGrady, Andrew Wiggins, and Shaquille O'Neal.
- On January 28, 2020, Devin Booker became the fourth-youngest player to reach 7,000 points in the NBA, behind only LeBron James, Kevin Durant, and Carmelo Anthony.
- On February 8, 2020, Deandre Ayton became the fourth-fastest player to reach 1,000 rebounds since 1992, with only Shaquille O'Neal, Blake Griffin, and Tim Duncan being faster than Ayton.
- On August 4, 2020, Devin Booker became the sixth-youngest player to reach 7,500 points behind LeBron James, Kevin Durant, Carmelo Anthony, Kobe Bryant, and Tracy McGrady.

=== Team milestones ===
- On November 2, 2019, Devin Booker surpassed former teammate Jared Dudley to be the seventh-highest scoring three-point shooter in franchise history with three three-point field goals made in a win over the Memphis Grizzlies.
- Devin Booker became the 17th player in franchise history to score over 6,000 points for the Suns, scoring 40 points in a win over the Philadelphia 76ers on November 5, 2019.
  - Booker then surpassed Neal Walk to become the 16th highest scoring player in franchise history the next game three days later with 22 points scored in a loss to the Miami Heat.
- On December 7, 2019, Devin Booker surpassed Hall of Famer and Phoenix Suns Ring of Honor member Connie Hawkins to become the 15th highest scoring player in franchise history with 35 points scored in a loss to the Houston Rockets.
- Devin Booker later surpassed his (first) rookie season head coach, Jeff Hornacek, on the scoring list only four days later with 15 points scored to then become the 14th highest scorer in franchise history in a loss to the Memphis Grizzlies.
- On December 21, 2019, Devin Booker surpassed his one-time former teammate, Leandro Barbosa, to become the 13th highest scoring player in franchise history with 19 points scored in a loss to the Houston Rockets.
- On December 30, 2019, Devin Booker surpassed Hall of Famer and Phoenix Suns Ring of Honor member Charles Barkley with 33 points scored in a 122–116 win over the Portland Trail Blazers to become the 12th highest scoring player in franchise history.
- On January 10, 2020, Devin Booker tied former power forward/center Channing Frye as the sixth-highest three-point shooter in franchise history with four three-point field goals made in a win over the Orlando Magic.
  - Booker then surpassed Frye in the next game just two days later with one made in a win over the Charlotte Hornets.
- Devin Booker became the 12th player in franchise history to score at least 7,000 points for the Phoenix Suns, reaching that point with 32 points (20 scored in the third quarter) in a 133–104 blowout win over the Dallas Mavericks on January 28, 2020.
- On February 7, 2020, Devin Booker surpassed former shooting guard Raja Bell with four three-point shots made in a blowout win over the Houston Rockets to become the fifth-best three-point shooter in franchise history.
- On March 8, 2020, Devin Booker not only tied Amar'e Stoudemire with the second-most 30+ point games in the franchise at 86 behind only Walter Davis at 90, but he also tied former forward Shawn Marion for being the team's fourth-best three-point shooter in a 140–131 win over the Milwaukee Bucks.
  - He later surpassed Shawn Marion by the end of their last originally scheduled NBA game played with two three-pointers made two days later against the Portland Trail Blazers, their last game before this season's suspension began.
  - On August 2, 2020, Devin Booker reached 87 games of 30+ points with the Suns against the Dallas Mavericks in Orlando, being the official second-highest player in franchise history to score 30+ points in games with Phoenix. That night, he scored 32 before being fouled out of the game in a close 117–115 win over Dallas as the home team.
- On August 4, 2020, Devin Booker tied Walter Davis for the most buzzer-beating, game-winning shots in franchise history with a buzzer-beating two-pointer over both Paul George and Kawhi Leonard in their close 117–115 win over the Los Angeles Clippers as the road team.
- On August 10, 2020, Devin Booker tied Walter Davis for the most 30+ point games with Phoenix, having 90 games with that amount scored (also reaching it with a near half-court three-pointer early in the third quarter) in a blowout 128–101 win over the Oklahoma City Thunder as the home team.
  - Booker later broke Walter Davis' record for the most 30+ point games with the Suns a day later, scoring 35 points in a 130–117 win over the Philadelphia 76ers as the road team.

== Transactions ==
=== Trades ===
July 6, 2019
Three–team trade
To Indiana Pacers

(United States) T. J. Warren (from Phoenix)
2022 second-round pick (from Miami)
2025 second-round pick (from Miami)
2026 second-round pick (from Miami)

To Miami Heat

Draft rights to #32 pick (United States) KZ Okpala (from Phoenix)

To Phoenix Suns

Cash Considerations (from Indiana)

July 6, 2019
To Phoenix Suns

(Croatia) Dario Šarić
Draft rights to #11 pick (United States) Cameron Johnson

To Minnesota Timberwolves

Draft rights to #6 pick (United States) Jarrett Culver

July 6, 2019
To Phoenix Suns

(New Zealand) / (Australia) Aron Baynes
Draft rights to #24 pick (United States) Ty Jerome (from Philadelphia via Boston)

To Boston Celtics

2020 protected first-round pick (from Milwaukee via Phoenix)

July 7, 2019
To Phoenix Suns

(United States) Jevon Carter
(United States) Kyle Korver

To Memphis Grizzlies

(United States) Josh Jackson
(United States) De'Anthony Melton
2020 second-round pick
2021 protected second-round pick

I: Memphis would only get Phoenix's 2021 second-round pick if their selection went inside the Top-35. However, that pick went to the Brooklyn Nets instead due to the protections of a previous trade involving the selection, with the Suns' second-round pick being above their top-35 protection area.

=== Free agents ===
==== Re-Signed ====
Player	Signed	Date
Kelly Oubre Jr.	Signed 2-year deal worth $30 million	July 16, 2019

==== Additions ====
Player	Signed	Former team(s)
Jalen Lecque	Signed 4-year partially guaranteed deal worth $6,129,593	Brewster Academy Bobcats
Ricky Rubio	Signed 3-year deal worth $51,000,000	Utah Jazz
Frank Kaminsky III	Signed 2-year partially guaranteed deal worth $10,000,000	Charlotte Hornets
Cheick Diallo	Signed 2-year partially guaranteed deal worth $3,500,000	New Orleans Pelicans
Jared Harper	Signed two-way contract worth at least $79,568	Auburn Tigers
Tariq Owens	Signed Exhibit 10 / two-way contract worth at least $50,000	Texas Tech Red Raiders / Northern Arizona Suns
Jonah Bolden	Signed a 10-day contract worth $81,677	Philadelphia 76ers
Cameron Payne	Signed 2-year partially guaranteed deal worth $2,173,299	(Canada) Toronto Raptors / (China) Shanxi Guotou Loongs / Texas Legends

a: Jalen Lecque's first two seasons with the team were fully guaranteed, but the third year is only partially guaranteed and his fourth year is non-guaranteed.
b: Both Frank Kaminsky and Cheick Diallo held deals that were only fully guaranteed if their respective team options were approved by next season.
c: Players that signed a two-way contract this season received the minimum of $79,568 throughout the duration of this season, with the maximum amount of potential earned revenue being $410,706 this season.
d: Tariq Owens originally signed a training camp deal on September 27, 2019 for a shot at competing for an open two-way contract. However, because he failed to get that contract during training camp and later signed up for that contract on the original last possible day two-way contracts could be signed with any NBA teams for the regular season, his guaranteed salary from the contract was cut from the standard two-way contract rate to the minimum salary of at least $50,000 for the year 2020 as a part of the Exhibit 10 clause.
e: Tariq Owens previously signed with the Phoenix Suns as an undrafted free agent from Texas Tech University during their original training camp period for the season on September 27, 2019 before being waived by the end of the preseason. He then joined the NBA G League affiliate Northern Arizona Suns by November 8, 2019 before rejoining Phoenix as the team's second two-way contract for the rest of the (initial) regular season on January 15, 2020.
f: Jonah Bolden originally signed with Phoenix on February 12, 2020, a few days before the 2020 NBA All-Star Weekend. Because the length didn't originally extend into the required games necessary for the contract's length, Bolden stayed with the team for an extra day under this signing.
g: Because Cameron Payne signed with the Suns during the brief period of June 22-July 1, 2020, Payne only received a total of $196,288 for the rest of this season before potentially getting a proper salary of $1,977,011 for the next season, equalling his veteran's minimum salary available for the resumed season and upcoming next season.
h: Cameron Payne initially signed with the defending champion Toronto Raptors on July 25, 2019, but he did not make it to their regular season roster on October 19 after being dismissed from training camp. After being cut from the team, Payne then signed a deal with the Shanxi Guotou Loongs in China, though he was waived by Shanxi on January 2, 2020 after only playing a couple of games for them. Because he was waived by Shanxi before the COVID-19 pandemic struck internationally from China to the United States, Payne was cleared to play for the Texas Legends during this season on January 25, where he played for them until the suspension and eventual cancellation of the 2019–20 NBA G League season. Because he last played for the NBA G League and not China, Payne was eligible to sign with Phoenix for the rest of this season, as well as for all of their next season on June 30, 2020, though he'll only earn $25,000 initially for that next season.

==== Subtractions ====
Player	Reason left	New team(s)
Jimmer Fredette	Waived	(Greece) Panathinaikos B.C. OPAP
Ray Spalding	Waived	Atlanta Hawks / Houston Rockets / Rio Grande Valley Vipers / Charlotte Hornets / Greensboro Swarm
George King	Two-way contract expired	(Italy) Dolomiti Energia Trento / (Poland) Stelmet Enea BC Zielona Góra
Troy Daniels	Unrestricted free agent	Los Angeles Lakers / Denver Nuggets
Richaun Holmes	Unrestricted free agent	Sacramento Kings
Josh Jackson; De'Anthony Melton	Traded	Memphis Grizzlies / Memphis Hustle
Kyle Korver	Waived	Milwaukee Bucks
Dragan Bender	Unrestricted free agent	Milwaukee Bucks / Wisconsin Herd / Golden State Warriors
Jamal Crawford	Unrestricted free agent	Brooklyn Nets
Tyler Johnson	Waived	Brooklyn Nets
Jonah Bolden	10-day contract expired	(Australia) Sydney Kings
Jared Harper	Waived two-way contract	New York Knicks / Westchester Knicks

i: Jimmer Fredette would play with the Golden State Warriors in the 2019 NBA Summer League and Team Fredette for The Basketball Tournament 2019 before signing for the Panathinaikos B.C. OPAP in Greece for the rest of the season on July 15, 2019. However, due to the COVID-19 pandemic, the resulting seasons in both Greece and the EuroLeague were cut short and eventually canceled altogether, with no chances to return to the NBA this season being available for him.
j: Ray Spalding signed a deal with the Atlanta Hawks after the end of the 2019 NBA Summer League on July 31, 2019. However, Spalding would only play in their training camp and preseason before being waived on October 8, 2019. He then signed with the Houston Rockets for their preseason on October 10, 2019 before being waived nine days later on October 19. After that point, he joined Houston's NBA G League affiliate team, the Rio Grande Valley Vipers, on November 8 before signing a two-way contract with the Charlotte Hornets on January 15, 2020. During that period, he played only for the Greensboro Swarm, as he did not have the chance to play for the Hornets properly this season due to the 2019–20 NBA season suspension ending Charlotte's season prematurely. However, he would play in inter-squad scrimmage games set up by the NBA in late September and early October 2020, though he ended up getting waived by November 2020, never having the chance to play for the Hornets properly.
k: George King originally played with the Utah Jazz before signing a deal to play with the Dolomiti Energia Trento in Italy on July 21, 2019. He then played with the Stelmet Enea BC Zielona Góra in Poland on January 17, 2020, though neither team would finish their respective seasons due to the COVID-19 pandemic. Furthermore, King would not be granted permission to return to the NBA this season as a result of playing overseas during the pandemic.
l: Troy Daniels originally signed a one-year deal with the Los Angeles Lakers on July 7, 2019. However, Daniels was later waived by the Lakers on March 1, 2020, the original last possible day a player could be waived and still compete for the 2020 NBA Playoffs with another team. He was then claimed off waivers by the Denver Nuggets four days later on March 5, even playing a game for Denver before the 2019–20 NBA season suspension took place. However, they would recover to play for more games in Orlando for the rest of the regular season and playoffs afterward, including being involved in the 2020 Western Conference Finals against the eventual champion Lakers.
m: Both Josh Jackson and De'Anthony Melton were traded to the Memphis Grizzlies on July 7, 2019. However, both Jackson and Melton also spent time with the Grizzlies' NBA G League affiliate, the Memphis Hustle, during this season.
n: Dragan Bender originally received a deal with the Milwaukee Bucks on July 25, 2019 and signed with them five days later. However, Bender spent most of his season with the Wisconsin Herd, albeit with him also playing a few games with the Bucks before being waived by Milwaukee (with guaranteed money) on February 10, 2020. He then signed a 10-day contract with the Golden State Warriors on February 23, impressing them enough to earn a second 10-day contract on March 5. However, Bender's second 10-day contract ended in limbo due to this season's suspension, which led to the season's early closure for Golden State with the worst record in the league this season. Furthermore, because the contract ended prematurely thanks to the COVID-19 pandemic, he could not return with the Warriors after that contract expired by the season's return, even if the Warriors wanted to with their inter-squad scrimmages in late September and early October. He eventually signed a deal with Maccabi Tel Aviv to return with them in Israel on September 23, with an out-clause to return to the NBA if he improves well enough there.
o: Jamal Crawford did not receive any opportunities to play anywhere either in the NBA or overseas during the original regular season. However, he did receive a substitute player’s option with the Brooklyn Nets for the rest of the season in the 2020 NBA Bubble on July 9, 2020 despite it being after the brief signing period of June 22-July 1, 2020 where he was considered the most eligible to sign a new contract for the season. Crawford was replacing guard Spencer Dinwiddie, who caught the COVID-19 virus back in June and was not recommended to travel with the team, during the Nets' time in Orlando, Florida. He also became the eighth player to play in at least 20 seasons with his brief stint for the Nets, albeit playing in one game before being injured and eventually retiring from play altogether in the Bubble.
p: Tyler Johnson did not sign with a new team before the suspension of this season. However, Johnson received a new deal with the Brooklyn Nets on June 24, 2020, replacing Theo Pinson's position during the NBA's brief period of making new moves for the return of this season and later being reunited with former teammate Jamal Crawford during the Nets' stay in Orlando this season. Furthermore, Johnson was eligible to play in the 2020 NBA Playoffs since he was waived after the trade deadline in February.
q: Due to the 2019–20 NBA season suspension, Jonah Bolden had the potential to receive a new deal by any one of the 22 NBA teams competing in this season's resumption period in the event he was called up as a replacement player for a team during the regular season and/or playoffs if a player was infected with COVID-19. However, due to the 2020 NBA Bubble working very effectively against the virus, to the point where none of the players or NBA staff that entered the Bubble once the resumed season truly began did not catch COVID-19 there at all, none of the teams competing in Orlando ended up opening a spot up for Bolden either during this season or in these playoffs. After that point, Bolden initially retired from basketball early altogether at 25 years old in order to pursue a career with cryptocurrency in mind. However, he later unretired himself from the sport on June 19, 2023 by signing a deal with the Sydney Kings in Australia.
r: Jared Harper was initially waived by the Phoenix Suns on March 12, 2020 during the season's suspension, noting the eventual cancellation of the 2019–20 NBA G League season as a reason for waiving him, though his waiver was not regarded as official by the NBA until June 23 later that year due to the announced move being made after the suspension of the season began.
s: Jared Harper's two-way contract was claimed by the New York Knicks before reaching the Bubble's free agency period on June 25, 2020, thus letting them keep the previous two-way lease the Suns had on him while also waiving Kadeem Allen's two-way contract in the process. However, because the Knicks were one of eight teams to not resume their season after the 2019–20 NBA season suspension ended, Harper did not play with them for this season, though he did at least compete in inter-squad scrimmage games set in late September and early October with these games including players from both the New York team and some Westchester Knicks players that were selected for these training games there. Harper later signed a new two-way contract on November 25, 2020, which let him play for both the Knicks in New York and Westchester during the following season.
