= Riccardo Fois =

Italian basketball player and coach (born 1987)

New York Knicks
- Title: Assistant coach
- League: NBA

Personal information
- Born: 19 February 1987 (age 39) Olbia, Italy
- Listed height: 6 ft 2 in (1.88 m)

Career information
- College: Pepperdine (2007–2008)
- NBA draft: 2009: undrafted
- Playing career: 2009–2012
- Position: Shooting guard
- Number: 19
- Coaching career: 2012–present

Career history

Coaching
- 2012–2014: Pepperdine (graduate assistant)
- 2014–2019: Gonzaga (dir. analytics)
- 2017–present: Italy (assistant)
- 2019–2021: Phoenix Suns (player development)
- 2021–2024: Arizona (assistant)
- 2024–2025: Sacramento Kings (assistant)
- 2025–present: New York Knicks (assistant)

Career highlights
- NBA champion (2026); NBA Cup champion (2025)

Riccardo Fois (born 19 February 1987) is an Italian professional basketball coach and former player who currently serves as an assistant coach for the New York Knicks of the National Basketball Association (NBA). He has previously served as an assistant coach at the University of Arizona, and for the Phoenix Suns and Sacramento Kings of the NBA. He played prep basketball at Boaz High School (Boaz, Alabama) while in the exchange student program and later went onto play college basketball for the Pepperdine Waves.

== Playing career ==
When Fois first moved to the United States, he played the 2007–08 season at Pepperdine and was named to the WCC Commissioner's Honor Roll.

Fois played professionally in Italy's 3rd-tier Serie B from 2009 to 2012. He played for Robur Basket Osimo and Pallacanestro Firenze.

== National team career ==
Fois was a member of the Italy national under-16 team at the 2003 European Championship for Cadets in Madrid, Spain. Over six tournament games, he averaged 0.8 points and 0.8 rebounds per game.

== Coaching career ==
Fois served as a graduate assistant for Pepperdine from 2012 to 2014.

Fois then worked for the Gonzaga Bulldogs for five seasons (2014–2019), elevating to the title of director of analytics. In this role, he handled video breakdown and exchange, evaluated player analytics and assisted the coaching staff with day-to-day program operations. The Bulldogs advanced at least as far as the Sweet 16 of the NCAA tournament in all five of Fois' seasons, and he helped the program reach its first-ever Final Four in 2017, played in Glendale, Arizona, when Gonzaga finished as national runner-up.

Fois assisted Gonzaga's head coach Mark Few as the video coordinator for the United States national team coached by Few that won the bronze medal at the 2015 Pan American Games in Toronto, Canada. Fois was an assistant coach for the Italian national team during the 2017 FIBA EuroBasket championship, serving on the staff of Ettore Messina.

On June 26, 2019, Fois joined Monty Williams with the Phoenix Suns as director of player development. After a first season where the Suns miss the playoff by a game after going undefeated in the bubble, the Suns take off and make the NBA finals losing only to the Bucks.

In 2021 he signed with University of Arizona with Tommy Lloyd as an assistant coach. In 3 years Arizona collected two Pac-12 championships and two Pac-12 regular season. While they fall short of to a Final Four, the Wildcats were a 1 seed and twice a 2 seed in the NCAA tournament and reached two sweet 16 in 3 years.

In 2021 he also joined coach Gianmarco Pozzecco as an assistant in the Italian National team. They lost to eventual silver medalist France in the quarter final of the 2021 Eurobasket after upsetting Nikola Jokic's Serbia in the previous round.

In 2023 they lost in the quarterfinals of the FIBA World Cup in the Philippines vs. the US, the first Italian appearance in the top 8 in the world in over 20 years.

On 9 September 2024, Fois was hired as an assistant coach by the Sacramento Kings. On 3 May 2025, Fois was not retained as an assistant coach of the Kings.

On 13 July 2025, the New York Knicks hired Fois to serve as an assistant on their coaching staff under head coach Mike Brown.

Fois is credited with developing and helping numerous players during his career: from Domantas Sabonis, Zach Collins, Killian Tillie, Rui Hachimura in his time at Gonzaga, to Mikal Bridges and Cameron Johnson with the Suns, until Bennedict Mathurin, Dalen Terry, Christian Koloko and Pelle Larsson at Arizona.

== Personal life ==
Fois earned his bachelor's degree in integrated marketing communication from the Pepperdine University in 2008 and earned his master's degree in business administration from Pepperdine in 2014.

== See also ==
- List of foreign NBA coaches
