= Our Lady of the Sacred Heart High School (Coraopolis) =

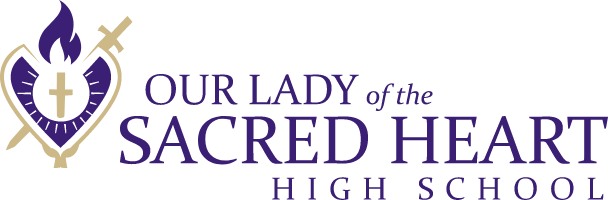

Location
- 1504 Woodcrest Avenue; Coraopolis, (Allegheny County), Pennsylvania 15108; United States; 40°30′8″N 80°9′25″W

Information
- Type: Private, Coeducational
- Religious affiliation: Roman Catholic
- Patron saint: Our Lady of the Sacred Heart (Blessed Mother Mary)
- Established: 1932
- School district: Moon Area School District (Serves 21 different districts)
- CEEB code: 390845
- President: Terry O'Rourke Donoghue
- Principal: Dave Thomas
- Grades: 9-12
- Enrollment: 377 (2013-14 School Year)
- Campus size: 75 acres (300,000 m^{2})
- Colors: Purple and Gold
- Mascot: Charger
- Nickname: O.L.S.H.
- Team name: The Chargers
- Accreditation: Middle States Association of Colleges and Schools
- Publication: The OLSH Echo (literary magazine)
- Newspaper: The Clarion
- Director of Admissions: Jessica Sellman
- Athletic Director: Mike McDonald
- Website: www.olsh.org

Our Lady of the Sacred Heart High School is a private Catholic high school in Moon Township, Pennsylvania. Located in the Roman Catholic Diocese of Pittsburgh, it is a ministry of the Felician Sisters. Among students and in colloquial terms, it is referred to as OLSH /ˈoʊlʃ/.

== History ==
OLSH opened in September 1932 to girls in the ninth and tenth grades. Some of the students studied to enter the sisterhood; others came from nearby communities. Eventually provisions were made for boarders as well. By the late sixties, the aspirancy and the boarding facilities were phased out and OLSH was ready to enter a new era.

In 1970, with the permission of the diocese of Pittsburgh and the approval of the administration of the Felician Sisters, the first boys were admitted to OLSH. The years that followed have seen a steady increase in numbers and in programs and activities for both young men and women at OLSH.

The 1979 Supreme Court decision upholding free transportation for non-public school students is significant in the history of the school in that it broadened the school's recruitment base. Currently students from 29 different school districts come together to form the OLSH community.

== Location ==
OLSH is located on a 75-acre (300,000 m^{2}) campus in Coraopolis, about 12 miles (19 km) west of Pittsburgh.

== Athletics ==
The OLSH Athletic Program offers twenty interscholastic sports teams for students.

=== Fall sports ===
- Girls Volleyball
- Girls Soccer
- Boys Soccer
- Girls & Boys Cross Country
- Golf
- Football
- Cheerleading

=== Winter sports ===
- Girls Basketball
- Boys Basketball
- Freshman Boys Basketball
- Girls & Boys Bowling
- Cheerleading
- Swimming (co-op with Cornell High School)
- Ice Hockey

=== Spring sports ===
- Boys Baseball
- Girls Softball
- Girls and Boys Track and Field
- Boys Volleyball

Internet radio broadcasts of many OLSH athletic contests are provided by The OLSH Sports Network. Football, boys and girls basketball, girls volleyball, baseball, boys soccer and softball games have been broadcast since the Network's inception in 2006-07. The games were previously streams through the MSA Sports Network and can be accessed at www.msasports.net. Currently the games are streamed at www.OLSHChargers.com

== Notable alumni ==
- Mike Turzai (1977), former Pennsylvania speaker of the house
- Cameron Johnson (2014), basketball player for the Brooklyn Nets
