= Jake Layman =

American basketball player (born 1994)

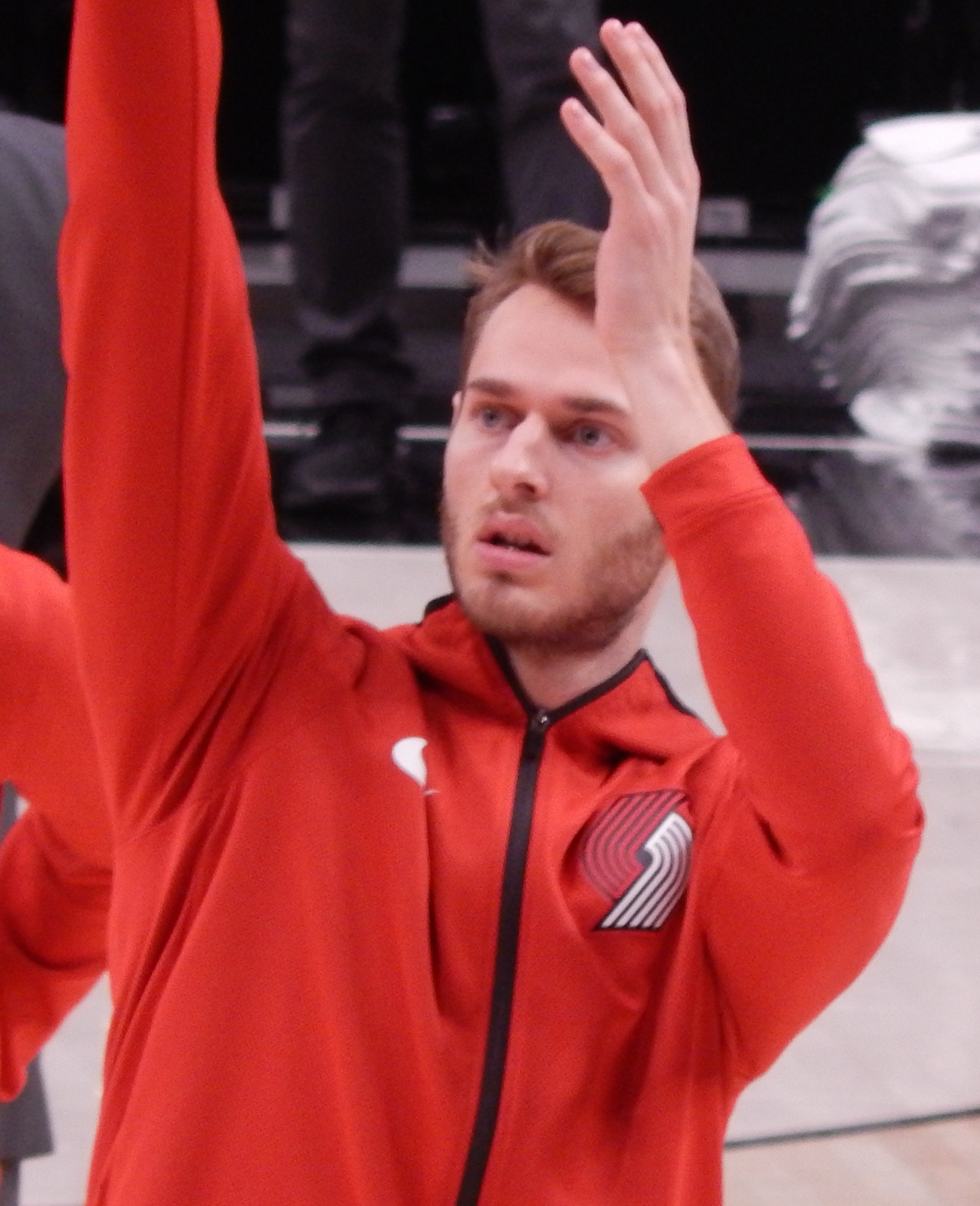
- Layman with the Portland Trail Blazers in 2019

No. 10 – Sendai 89ers
- Position: Small forward
- League: B.League

Personal information
- Born: March 7, 1994 (age 32) Norwood, Massachusetts, U.S.
- Listed height: 6 ft 9 in (2.06 m)
- Listed weight: 209 lb (95 kg)

Career information
- High school: King Philip Regional (Wrentham, Massachusetts)
- College: Maryland (2012–2016)
- NBA draft: 2016: 2nd round, 47th overall pick
- Drafted by: Orlando Magic
- Playing career: 2016–present

Career history
- 2016–2019: Portland Trail Blazers
- 2017: → Windy City Bulls
- 2019–2022: Minnesota Timberwolves
- 2023–2026: SeaHorses Mikawa
- 2026–present: Sendai 89ers

Career highlights
- Third-team All-Big Ten – Media (2015)
- Stats at NBA.com
- Stats at Basketball Reference
Medals
Men's basketball
Representing the United States
FIBA Americas U18 Championship
Gold medal – first place	2012 Brazil	Team

Jake Douglas Layman (born March 7, 1994) is an American professional basketball player for the Sendai 89ers of the B.League. He played college basketball for the Maryland Terrapins.

Layman was drafted with the 47th overall pick in the 2016 NBA draft by the Orlando Magic before being traded to the Portland Trail Blazers on draft night. He spent three seasons in Portland before being dealt to the Timberwolves as part of a sign-and-trade deal. He was signed by the Celtics in free agency in September 2022.

== High school career ==
Born in Norwood, Massachusetts, Layman was considered a "late bloomer" at King Philip Regional High School and didn't even start for his AAU team. Despite his 6 ft 9 in (2.06 m) height, he preferred to play on the perimeter. He played AAU basketball for Leo Papile with the Boston Amateur Basketball Club (BABC). As a senior, he averaged 26 points, five blocks, and four assists per game. ESPN rated him the 17th-best small forward nationally and the 3rd-best player in Massachusetts.

Layman was selected as the 2012 HockomockSports.com Boys' Basketball Player of the Year. He was also chosen as the Hockomock League's Most Valuable Player for boys' basketball in 2012.

== College career ==
Layman was recruited by Massachusetts native and then Maryland assistant basketball coach, Scott Spinelli. He started 17 games and averaged 5.5 points per game as a freshman.

Layman improved his averages to 11.7 points and 5.0 rebounds per game as a sophomore.

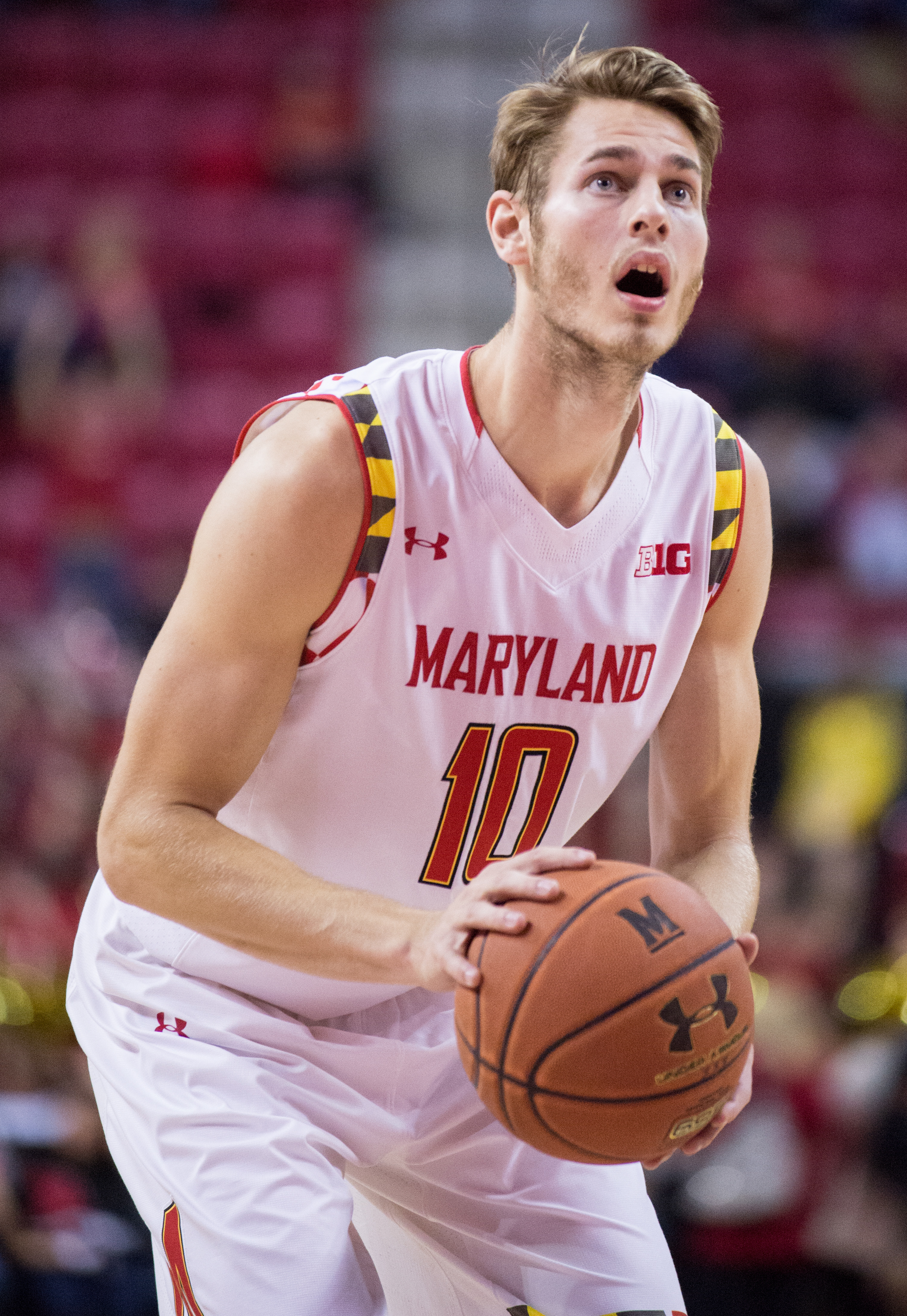
Layman in 2014

As a junior, Layman was a third-team All-Big Ten selection by the media. However, he was only an honorable mention All-Big Ten selection by the coaches. He was twice named Big Ten Player of the Week. Layman was nominated for the inaugural Karl Malone Power Forward of the Year Award. Layman led Maryland to the NCAA Tournament for the first time in five years. He finished third on the team in scoring behind Melo Trimble and Dez Wells with 12.5 points per game and led the team in rebounding with 5.8 rebounds per game. After speaking with an NBA advisory committee, Layman decided to return to school for his senior season and forgo a possible second round selection in the 2015 NBA draft.

As a senior, he was an honorable mention All-Big 10 selection by the coaches and media. Layman averaged 11.6 points and 5.3 rebounds per game, shooting 50 percent from the field and 39.6 percent from three-point range.

== Professional career ==
=== Portland Trail Blazers (2016–2019) ===
On June 23, 2016, Layman was selected by the Orlando Magic with the 47th overall pick in the 2016 NBA draft. He was subsequently traded to the Portland Trail Blazers on draft night in exchange for a future second-round pick and cash considerations. On July 6, he signed with the Trail Blazers and joined the team for the 2016 NBA Summer League. Layman made his NBA debut on November 1, scoring 17 points in eight minutes off the bench in the Trail Blazers' 127–104 loss to the Golden State Warriors. He hit five three-pointers in the game, becoming the first Trail Blazer ever to make five three-pointers in a debut, and finished one shy of the franchise record in a quarter.

=== Minnesota Timberwolves (2019–2022) ===
On July 8, 2019, Layman signed a 3-year, $11.5 million contract with the Blazers and was subsequently traded to the Minnesota Timberwolves as a part of a sign-and-trade deal in exchange for the draft rights to Bojan Dubljević.

On September 15, 2022, Layman signed with the Boston Celtics. He was waived on October 15.

On November 9, 2022, Layman signed with Baxi Manresa of the Liga ACB. On November 15, however, the club terminated his contract due to a herniated disc.

=== SeaHorses Mikawa (2023–2026) ===
On June 30, 2023, Layman signed with SeaHorses Mikawa of the Japanese B.League.

=== Sendai 89ers (2026–present) ===
On June 18, 2026, it was announced that Layman had signed a contract with the Sendai 89ers for the 2026–27 season.

== National team career ==
In the summer of 2012, Layman was on the under-18 United States national team that defeated Brazil for the gold medal in the FIBA Americas championship. He played more than expected due to an injury to Sam Dekker. Layman played 12 minutes per game and averaged nearly eight points and four rebounds per game. In an opening round game versus Mexico, Layman led the U.S. team in scoring with 18 points.

== Player profile ==
Layman has drawn comparisons to Chandler Parsons. Both players have the size to grab rebounds but also the shooting ability to hit 3-pointers. Of the comparison, Layman noted, “I feel like his game fits a little more in the NBA than in the college game, and that’s what I feel like. I think I’m a guy that doesn’t have to have the ball in his hands all the time to really make an impact. I feel like I could be one of those guys that hangs out in the perimeter and just shoots 3's and slashes to the basket when he needs to.”

== Personal life ==
Layman has four brothers: Connor, Jimmy, Ryan and Kyle. His parents, Tim and Claire, played college sports at the University of Maine at Orono. In July 2019, Layman married his long-term girlfriend Jasmine.

== Career statistics ==
Legend
GP	Games played	GS	Games started	MPG	Minutes per game
FG%	Field goal percentage	3P%	3-point field goal percentage	FT%	Free throw percentage
RPG	Rebounds per game	APG	Assists per game	SPG	Steals per game
BPG	Blocks per game	PPG	Points per game	**Bold**	Career high

=== NBA ===
==== Regular season ====
Year	Team	GP	GS	MPG	FG%	3P%	FT%	RPG	APG	SPG	BPG	PPG
2016–17	Portland	35	1	7.1	.292	.255	**.765**	.7	.3	.3	.1	2.2
2017–18	Portland	35	1	4.6	.298	.200	.667	.5	.3	.2	.1	1.0
2018–19	Portland	**71**	**33**	18.7	**.509**	.326	.704	**3.1**	**.7**	.4	**.4**	7.6
2019–20	Minnesota	23	2	**22.0**	.453	**.333**	.750	2.5	**.7**	**.7**	**.4**	**9.1**
2020–21	Minnesota	45	11	13.9	.495	.295	.703	1.5	.6	.6	**.4**	5.1
2021–22	Minnesota	34	1	6.8	.411	.229	.722	1.1	.3	.2	.1	2.4
Career		243	49	12.8	.460	.300	.719	1.7	.5	.4	.3	4.8

==== Playoffs ====
Year	Team	GP	GS	MPG	FG%	3P%	FT%	RPG	APG	SPG	BPG	PPG
2017	Portland	2	0	**8.0**	.500	**1.000**	.500	.5	.5	.5	0.0	3.0
2018	Portland	1	0	**8.0**	**1.000**	–	–	**1.0**	**1.0**	**2.0**	0.0	**6.0**
2019	Portland	**6**	0	3.3	.143	.000	**.750**	.7	0.0	0.0	0.0	0.8
Career		9	0	4.9	.429	.167	.667	.7	.2	.3	0.0	1.9
