= Cameron Johnson =

American basketball player (born 1996)

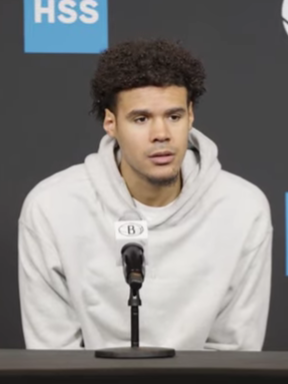
- Johnson in 2024

No. 23 – Denver Nuggets
- Position: Small forward / power forward
- League: NBA

Personal information
- Born: March 3, 1996 (age 30) Moon Township, Pennsylvania, U.S.
- Listed height: 6 ft 8 in (2.03 m)
- Listed weight: 210 lb (95 kg)

Career information
- High school: Moon Area (Moon, Pennsylvania); Our Lady of the Sacred Heart (Moon, Pennsylvania)
- College: Pittsburgh (2014–2017); North Carolina (2017–2019)
- NBA draft: 2019: 1st round, 11th overall pick
- Drafted by: Minnesota Timberwolves
- Playing career: 2019–present

Career history
- 2019–2023: Phoenix Suns
- 2023–2025: Brooklyn Nets
- 2025–present: Denver Nuggets

Career highlights
- First-team All-ACC (2019)
- Stats at NBA.com
- Stats at Basketball Reference

Cameron Jordan Johnson (born March 3, 1996) is an American professional basketball player for the Denver Nuggets of the National Basketball Association (NBA). He played college basketball for the Pittsburgh Panthers and the North Carolina Tar Heels. Drafted by the Minnesota Timberwolves with the eleventh overall pick in the 2019 NBA draft, Johnson was traded to the Phoenix Suns on draft night. During his sophomore season, he reached the 2021 NBA Finals with the Suns. He spent three full seasons in Phoenix before being traded to the Brooklyn Nets in February 2023. After nearly three full seasons with Brooklyn, Johnson was traded to the Nuggets in 2025.

== High school career ==
As a junior in high school, Johnson was a 6-foot-2 point guard before having a growth spurt. He graduated from Our Lady of the Sacred Heart. As a senior at OLSH, Johnson averaged 27.8 points, eight rebounds and five assists per game. He finished his career with 1,175 points. He signed with Pittsburgh in April 2014.

== College career ==
=== Pittsburgh (2014–2017) ===
Johnson suffered a shoulder injury shortly into his first year at Pittsburgh and was allowed to redshirt during that season in order to undergo rehabilitation for his injury. He was used as a substitute during his redshirt freshman year. As a redshirt sophomore at Pitt, Johnson averaged 11.9 points per game and hit 41.5% of his three-point attempts. Johnson graduated from Pittsburgh with a degree in communications in three years. He took advantage of the graduate transfer rule and moved to North Carolina without sitting out a year. The University of Pittsburgh initially refused to allow his release to their in-conference rival Tar Heels but eventually relented. He cited uncertainty in coaching and a losing record as factors in his decision to transfer.

=== North Carolina (2017–2019) ===
On November 15, 2017, five days after his team's season opener, Johnson had surgery to fix a torn meniscus. Johnson ended up sitting out ten games. Although hindered by the injury, Johnson finished third on the team in scoring with 12.4 points per game as well as grabbing 4.7 rebounds per game in his redshirt junior season. Johnson scored a career-high 32 points against Clemson. After the season, Johnson underwent an arthroscopic hip procedure and announced his intention to return to North Carolina for his senior season.

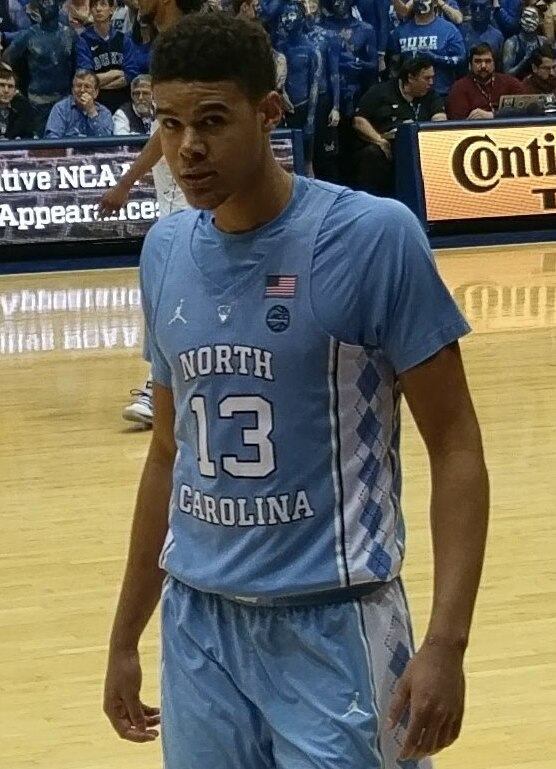
Johnson in 2018

Johnson's senior season proved to be his most statistically successful campaign. Unhindered by injury, Johnson was the leading scorer for the Tar Heels with 16.9 points per game and averaged 5.8 rebounds and 2.4 assists. Johnson shot 50.6 percent from the field and 45.7 percent from three, leading some commentators to call Johnson "the best shooter in [the] draft." Johnson had several notable performances during his senior season. Playing against Wake Forest in Winston-Salem, Johnson shot 79% from the field for the game and made his first six three-point attempts, ultimately finishing with 27 points in a 95–57 rout of the Demon Deacons. Against rival Duke in Cameron Indoor Stadium, Johnson finished with 26 points in an 88–72 victory against the Blue Devils, then the nation's top-ranked team. Against Clemson in Littlejohn Coliseum, Johnson made six three-pointers to finish with 19 points in a two-point victory. After the conclusion of conference play, Johnson was named to the All-ACC first team.

== Professional career ==
=== Phoenix Suns (2019–2023) ===
On June 20, 2019, the Minnesota Timberwolves drafted Johnson with the eleventh overall pick in the 2019 NBA draft, then immediately traded him and Dario Šarić to the Phoenix Suns for Jarrett Culver, the sixth pick of the draft. The trade was officially completed on July 6, with the Suns later announcing that they had signed Johnson the same day. On October 26, 2019, Johnson made his NBA debut coming off the bench in a 130–122 win over the Los Angeles Clippers. On November 19, he scored a season-high 18 points in a 120–116 loss to the Sacramento Kings. Johnson then matched his season-high on December 5 in a 139–132 overtime win over the New Orleans Pelicans.

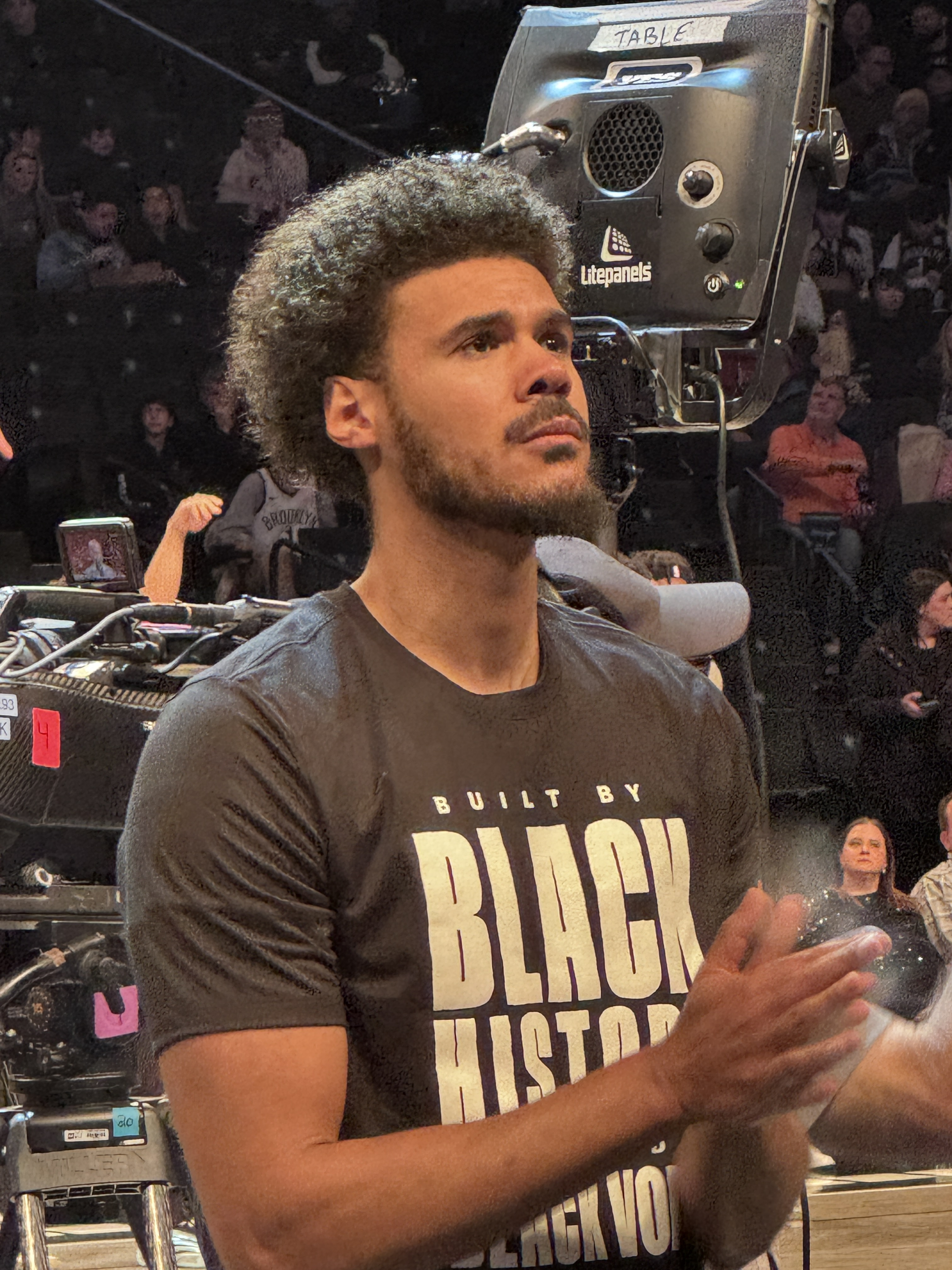
Johnson preparing for a game

Johnson had his first professional start with the team on February 10, 2020, against the Los Angeles Lakers. On March 3, 2020, Johnson scored a new season-high of 21 points on his 24th birthday in a 123–114 loss to the defending champion Toronto Raptors. After originally being out for the rest of March due to illness, Johnson returned to action as a starter on July 31, scoring 12 points in a 125–112 win over the Washington Wizards. Two days later, Johnson had his first professional double-double with 19 points and a season-high 12 rebounds in a 117–115 win over the Dallas Mavericks. He later recorded his second double-double of his rookie season on August 6, matching his season-high 12 rebounds with 14 points scored in a 114–99 win over the Indiana Pacers. Two days later, Johnson broke the franchise record previously set by Wesley Person for the quickest player to score at least 100 three-pointers in a 119–112 win over the Miami Heat, reaching it in only 54 games played. With Johnson starting for Phoenix, the Suns would have an 8–0 record in the 2020 NBA Bubble as of August 13, having a winning streak of at least 7 games for the first time since March 2010.

On December 27, 2020, Johnson matched his then career-high of 21 points off the bench in a 116–100 win over the Sacramento Kings. Johnson helped the Suns reach the 2021 NBA Finals, but the Suns lost the series in 6 games to the Milwaukee Bucks.

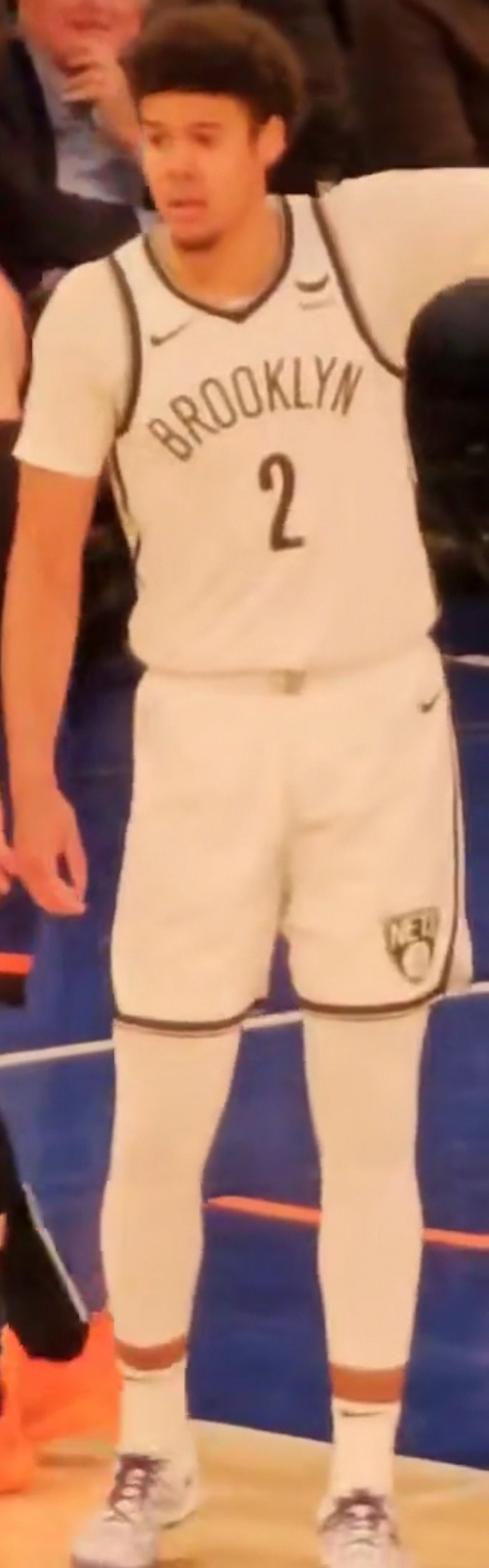
Johnson with the Nets in 2024

On March 4, 2022, Johnson put up a career-high 38 points with nine three-pointers made alongside a game-winning, buzzer-beating three-pointer in a 115–114 win over the New York Knicks. He finished third in NBA Sixth Man of the Year voting, behind winner Tyler Herro and Kevin Love.

To start the 2022–23 season, Johnson was named the starting power forward for the Suns by head coach Monty Williams. On November 8, 2022, Johnson underwent surgery to remove part of the meniscus in his right knee and was ruled out for at least one to two months.

=== Brooklyn Nets (2023–2025) ===
On February 9, 2023, the Suns traded Johnson to the Brooklyn Nets, along with Mikal Bridges, Jae Crowder, four unprotected first-round picks, and a 2028 first-round pick swap, in exchange for Kevin Durant and T. J. Warren. Johnson made his Nets debut two days later, recording 12 points, seven rebounds, seven assists and three steals in a 101–98 loss to the Philadelphia 76ers.

On July 6, 2023, Johnson re-signed with the Nets on a four-year, $94.5 million contract.

On November 19, 2024, Johnson had his best career game with the Nets, scoring 34 points and hitting 6 threes, leading them to a 1-point win over the Charlotte Hornets.

=== Denver Nuggets (2025–present) ===
On July 8, 2025, Johnson was traded to the Denver Nuggets in exchange for Michael Porter Jr. and a 2032 first-round pick. On December 25, Johnson was ruled out for four-to-six weeks after suffering a bone bruise and hyperextended right knee. On February 7, 2026, he returned from injury, scoring 14 points in 27 minutes during a 136–120 victory over the Chicago Bulls.

== National team career ==
Due to his mother's ethnic background, Johnson was eligible to represent Croatia internationally, and was reportedly recruited and encouraged to do so by Phoenix Suns teammate Dario Šarić.

Johnson ultimately decided to remain with the country of his birth and made the United States roster at the 2023 FIBA World Cup in the Philippines.

== Career statistics ==
Legend
GP	Games played	GS	Games started	MPG	Minutes per game
FG%	Field goal percentage	3P%	3-point field goal percentage	FT%	Free throw percentage
RPG	Rebounds per game	APG	Assists per game	SPG	Steals per game
BPG	Blocks per game	PPG	Points per game	**Bold**	Career high

=== NBA ===
==== Regular season ====
Year	Team	GP	GS	MPG	FG%	3P%	FT%	RPG	APG	SPG	BPG	PPG
2019–20	Phoenix	57	9	22.0	.435	.390	.807	3.3	1.2	.6	**.4**	8.8
2020–21	Phoenix	60	11	24.0	.420	.349	.847	3.3	1.4	.6	.3	9.6
2021–22	Phoenix	**66**	16	26.2	.460	.425	.860	4.1	1.5	.9	.2	12.5
2022–23	Phoenix	17	16	25.3	.474	**.455**	.818	3.8	1.5	.9	**.4**	13.9
2022–23	Brooklyn	25	25	30.8	.468	.372	.851	**4.8**	2.1	**1.4**	.3	16.6
2023–24	Brooklyn	58	47	27.6	.446	.391	.789	4.3	2.4	.8	.3	13.4
2024–25	Brooklyn	57	**57**	**31.6**	.475	.390	**.893**	4.3	**3.4**	.9	**.4**	**18.8**
2025–26	Denver	54	54	30.5	**.480**	.430	.839	3.8	2.4	.7	**.4**	12.2
Career		394	235	27.1	.457	.396	.849	3.9	2.0	.8	.3	12.8

==== Playoffs ====
Year	Team	GP	GS	MPG	FG%	3P%	FT%	RPG	APG	SPG	BPG	PPG
2021	Phoenix	**21**	0	21.1	.500	**.446**	**.906**	3.1	.8	.9	.2	8.2
2022	Phoenix	13	3	24.6	.465	.373	.813	3.5	1.5	.4	.1	10.8
2023	Brooklyn	4	4	**38.0**	**.509**	.429	.857	**5.8**	**2.8**	.8	**.3**	**18.5**
2026	Denver	6	**6**	31.0	.500	.314	.706	3.2	2.3	**1.0**	**.3**	14.2
Career		44	13	25.0	.491	.398	.830	3.5	1.4	.8	.2	10.7

=== College ===
Year	Team	GP	GS	MPG	FG%	3P%	FT%	RPG	APG	SPG	BPG	PPG
2014–15	Pittsburgh	8	0	14.4	.394	.348	.500	1.1	.5	.1	**.4**	4.5
2015–16	Pittsburgh	32	1	11.7	.397	.375	.808	1.8	.5	.3	.2	4.8
2016–17	Pittsburgh	33	33	**33.3**	.447	.415	.811	4.5	2.3	.9	.3	11.9
2017–18	North Carolina	26	20	29.3	.426	.341	**.847**	4.7	2.3	.7	.2	12.4
2018–19	North Carolina	**36**	**36**	29.9	**.505**	**.457**	.818	**5.8**	**2.4**	**1.2**	.3	**16.9**
Career		135	90	25.4	.456	.405	.817	4.1	1.8	.8	.3	11.2

== Personal life ==
Johnson is Catholic. When the national anthem is played before games, he recites Psalm 23. In Phoenix he also wore the jersey number 23 in part because of Psalm 23.

Johnson's brother, Donovan “Puff” Johnson, plays basketball for the Ohio State University Buckeyes. Johnson's mother, a Croatian American, is a school nurse. This inspired Johnson to give out special appreciation to healthcare workers and their families on their February 7, 2021 home game against the Boston Celtics, the Suns' first home game since March 8, 2020 to have fans enter their arena after dealing with the COVID-19 pandemic. Johnson is also a highly respected gamer, his favorite game being Kingdom Hearts 2.

== See also ==
- List of All-Atlantic Coast Conference men's basketball teams
