= Suspension of the 2019–20 NBA season =

Suspension of NBA season due to COVID-19

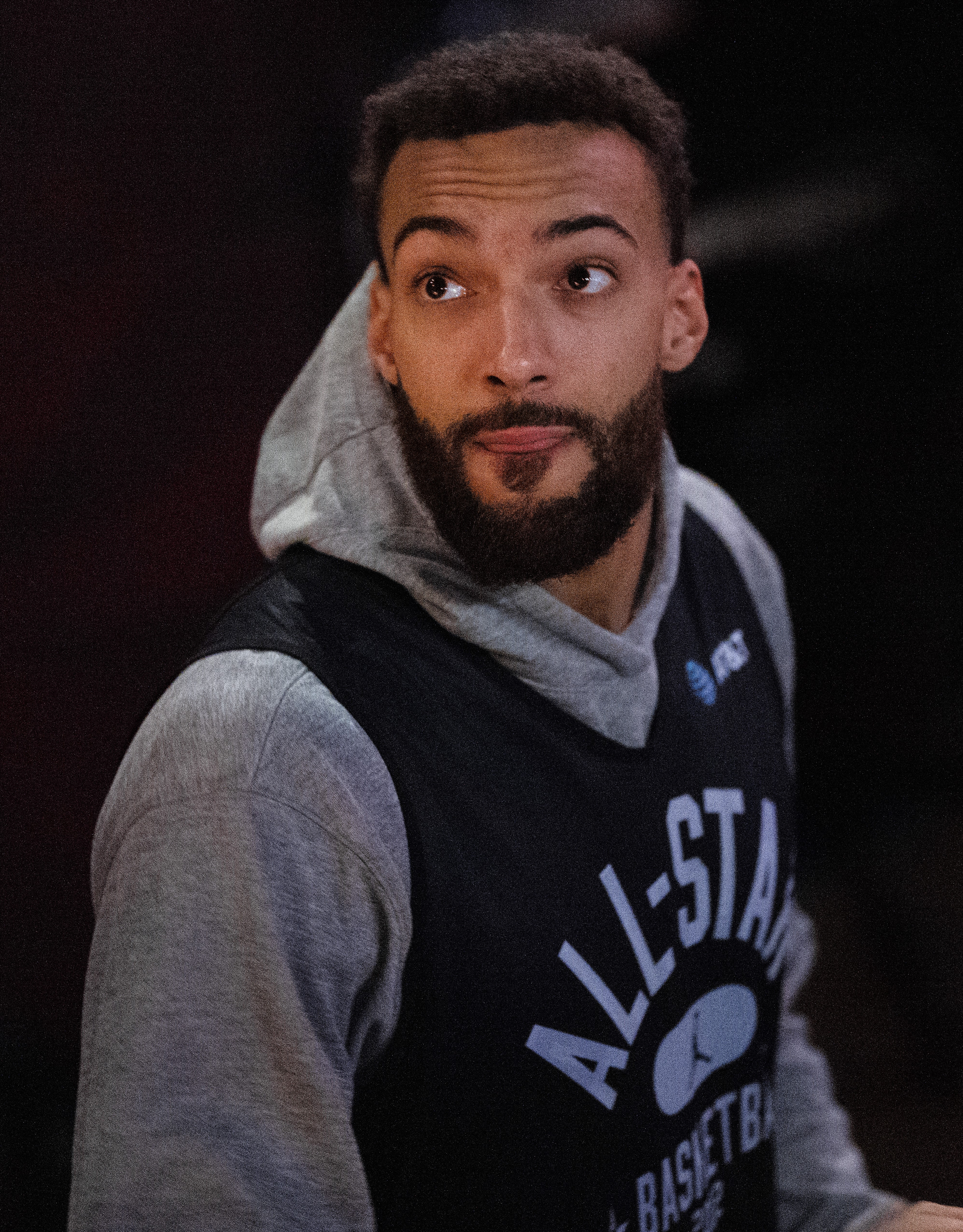
Rudy Gobert was the first NBA player to test positive for COVID-19.

On March 11, 2020, the National Basketball Association (NBA) announced the suspension of the 2019–20 season following Utah Jazz center Rudy Gobert testing positive for COVID-19, which occurred around the same time as COVID-19 lockdowns began in both the United States and Canada. Following this, on June 4, the NBA approved a plan to continue the 2019–20 season with 22 teams playing at Walt Disney World's ESPN Wide World of Sports Complex in the NBA bubble (the other 8 were eliminated from playoff contention), which began with exhibition scrimmages starting on July 22 and concluded with Game 6 of the 2020 NBA Finals on October 11.

On August 26, the season was suspended for a second time due to a wildcat strike during the playoffs in response to the shooting of Jacob Blake.

== Background ==
The NBA had been tracking the COVID-19 pandemic closely, speaking with public health authorities such as the Center for Disease Control (CDC) and the Public Health Agency of Canada (PHAC) on the matter. The league spoke to the players' union on the prospect of playing games without fans. The league held a conference call on March 11, 2020, between Commissioner Adam Silver and the 30 owners to reach a consensus on the matter. They were envisioning a scenario where games were to be played with essential personnel only and no fans in attendance, following suit with the NCAA.

In early March, the NBA recommended that players use fist bumps instead of high fives with fans and avoid taking items to autograph.

On March 9, the NBA, National Hockey League (NHL), Major League Baseball (MLB), and Major League Soccer (MLS) jointly announced that teams from all four leagues would be required to limit locker room access to players, coaches, general managers, and basketball and public relations staff, with the notable exclusion of media; several teams from the NBA and NHL had already begun voluntarily limiting locker room access during the previous week. The NBA had told teams they should make plans for the possibility of playing games without fans and with only essential personnel in attendance.

The Golden State Warriors announced on March 11 that their game the following day between them and the Brooklyn Nets would be played without fans, offering refunds or exchanges, following San Francisco's order prohibiting assemblies larger than 1,000 individuals. The Cleveland Cavaliers had also planned to play home games without fans, due to Ohio governor Mike DeWine banning mass gatherings in the state.

== Suspension ==
On March 11, the NBA indefinitely suspended the season for at least 30 days after Utah Jazz center Rudy Gobert tested positive for COVID-19 prior to the tip-off of the Jazz–Thunder game in Oklahoma City. After the referees asked the coaches to huddle to relay the information, players warming up were told to return to their locker rooms, and the referees relayed the league decision to the scorer's table, broadcasters and the arena's public address announcer. Attendees were then told by Chesapeake Energy Arena (now Paycom Center) PA announcer Mario Nanni that the game was postponed "due to unforeseen circumstances", and to safely depart the arena with a reassurance the crowd was "all safe". This was the biggest interruption to an NBA season since the 2011 NBA lockout.

The league suspended play following the conclusion of games played on March 11, and the Denver Nuggets–Dallas Mavericks and Atlanta Hawks–New York Knicks games that were already in progress at the time of the announcement continued. The New Orleans Pelicans–Sacramento Kings game later that night was postponed, as one of the referees scheduled to work that game had officiated a Jazz game earlier that week.

The league asked teams who played the Jazz in the past 10 days to undergo 14 days of self-isolation, including the Cleveland Cavaliers, New York Knicks, Boston Celtics, Detroit Pistons, Toronto Raptors, and the Oklahoma City Thunder. On March 12, the Philadelphia 76ers were asked to undergo self-isolation as well.

The NBA G League also suspended its season. It was eventually forced to cancel the rest of the season on June 4.

Following CDC recommendation that events of 50 or more persons be canceled for up to eight weeks, the NBA presented a best-case scenario of a return to play in June 2020, with the season ending in August 2020.

Gobert's positive test also caused a massive ripple effect across the sports world, as numerous amateur and professional sporting events and seasons were either suspended, postponed, cancelled or relocated as a direct result.

=== Subsequent actions ===
On March 12, the NBA delineated a set of policies that was effective through March 16. These included players being required to remain in the market of their team, no group workouts or practices, and team physicians or trainers talking to each player daily. The following day, the league and the National Basketball Players Association (NBPA) set a moratorium period until April 10, with players getting their pay in full on March 15. A memo sent to the NBA teams on March 15 allowed for players to travel out of their market provided they quarantined, do physical distancing, and give notices of their whereabouts. Teams were also encouraged to do health check-ins.

On April 6, Ernie Johnson of the NBA on TNT conducted an interview with Silver over videotelephony, which was posted to the league's Twitter account. In it, Silver stated there would be no decision on a restart of the season made before May 1 at the bare minimum, a date that Silver admitted that a decision might not be made, and it could come much later.

== Reactions ==
=== Players ===
The suspension drew remarks from several current and former NBA players. Several players pledged to offer assistance to arena workers across the league who are without work due to the league's response to COVID-19, although many of the teams pledged to help support their workers to varying degrees.

=== Teams and arenas ===
The Dallas Mavericks, Cleveland Cavaliers, and Detroit Pistons were among the first to announce plans that would pay their workers for the days they missed due to the suspension of the league. On March 28, the Pistons announced that they would offer their performance center to health officials for use against COVID-19.

=== National Hockey League ===
On March 12, 2020, the following day after the NBA suspended the season, the National Hockey League followed suit, suspending their 2019–20 season. In a statement addressing the situation, the NHL included:

The NHL has been attempting to follow the mandates of health experts and local authorities, while preparing for any possible developments without taking any premature or unnecessary measures. However, following last night's news that an NBA player has tested positive for the coronavirus – and given that our leagues share so many facilities and locker rooms and it now seems likely that some member of the NHL community would test positive at some point – it is no longer appropriate to try to continue to play games at this time.

The NHL became the first of the four major sports leagues to announce a return to play on May 26, 2020, with 24 of the league's 31 teams competing in a playoff tournament to decide the champion of the 2019–20 season.

== Impact ==
The suspension cost the league hundreds of millions of dollars in lost revenue in national television advertisements and lost ticket sales. With the vast majority of events at arenas cancelled, down-the-line workers lost revenue from unused tickets and effective employment as a result of closed concession stands and surrounding team memorabilia stands and shops, along with surrounding entertainment districts.

== Return ==
On June 4, the NBA Board of Governors approved 29–1 (with the lone dissenter being the Portland Trail Blazers) resuming the 2019–20 season in Orlando, Florida in a bubble at Walt Disney World, after prior consideration of Las Vegas and Houston as potential spots. The season continued as follows: The 2020 NBA draft was originally scheduled for October 15, but was rescheduled to November 18 instead.

Event	Dates
Training camp	July 9 – 11
Scrimmages	July 22 – 28
Remainder of 2019–20 season	July 30 – October 12 (the season resumed for 22 teams on July 30, while a potential Game 7 of the NBA Finals would take place no later than October 12)
Draft lottery	August 20
Free agency	October 18
2020–21 training camp	November 10
2020 NBA draft	November 18
2020–21 season start	December 22

Additionally, the teams involved were subject to intense social restrictions and their movement was limited to the bubble.

== Infected players and personnel ==
The following is a list of NBA players and personnel from the 2019–20 season that are known to have been infected in chronological order:

No.	Name	Team	Announced	Role	Ref.
1	Rudy Gobert	Utah Jazz	March 11, 2020	Player	
2	Donovan Mitchell	Utah Jazz	March 12, 2020	Player	
3	Christian Wood	Detroit Pistons	March 14, 2020	Player	
4	Kevin Durant	Brooklyn Nets	March 17, 2020	Players	
5	Undisclosed	Brooklyn Nets	March 17, 2020	Players	
6	Undisclosed	Brooklyn Nets	March 17, 2020	Players	
7	Undisclosed	Brooklyn Nets	March 17, 2020	Players	
8	Undisclosed	Denver Nuggets	March 19, 2020	Undisclosed	
9	Undisclosed	Philadelphia 76ers	March 19, 2020	Undisclosed	
10	Undisclosed	Philadelphia 76ers	March 19, 2020	Undisclosed	
11	Undisclosed	Philadelphia 76ers	March 19, 2020	Undisclosed	
12	Undisclosed	Los Angeles Lakers	March 19, 2020	Players	
13	Undisclosed	Los Angeles Lakers	March 19, 2020	Players	
14	Marcus Smart	Boston Celtics	March 19, 2020	Player	
15	Maury Hanks	Detroit Pistons	March 26, 2020	Scout	
16	James Dolan	New York Knicks	March 28, 2020	Owner	
17	Nikola Jokić	Denver Nuggets	June 23, 2020	Player	
18	Undisclosed	Phoenix Suns	June 23, 2020	Players	
19	Undisclosed	Phoenix Suns	June 23, 2020	Players	
20	Malcolm Brogdon	Indiana Pacers	June 24, 2020	Player	
21	Buddy Hield	Sacramento Kings	June 24, 2020	Players	
22	Alex Len	Sacramento Kings	June 24, 2020	Players	
23	Jabari Parker	Sacramento Kings	June 24, 2020	Players	
24	Derrick Jones Jr.	Miami Heat	June 25, 2020	Player	
25	Spencer Dinwiddie	Brooklyn Nets	June 29, 2020	Players	
26	DeAndre Jordan	Brooklyn Nets	June 29, 2020	Players	
27	Undisclosed	New Orleans Pelicans	June 30, 2020	Players	
28	Undisclosed	New Orleans Pelicans	June 30, 2020	Players	
29	Undisclosed	New Orleans Pelicans	June 30, 2020	Players	
30	Landry Shamet	Los Angeles Clippers	July 4, 2020	Player	
31	Russell Westbrook	Houston Rockets	July 13, 2020	Player	
32	Eric Bledsoe	Milwaukee Bucks	July 16, 2020	Player	
33	Aron Baynes	Phoenix Suns	July 22, 2020	Players	
34	Ricky Rubio	Phoenix Suns	July 22, 2020	Players	

On March 12, during a special edition of Inside the NBA, Hall of Fame player and analyst Charles Barkley revealed he was tested for COVID-19 after suffering from an illness following a recent trip to New York, which was rapidly becoming the worst hit locality of the U.S. pandemic. Barkley self-quarantined in Atlanta. Barkley's test was subsequently negative and he completed his isolation period two weeks later.

On March 17, the Brooklyn Nets announced that four of their players had tested positive as well, one of whom was forward Kevin Durant.

On March 19, the Denver Nuggets announced one of their players tested positive three days earlier. On the same day, the Philadelphia 76ers announced three of their staffers also tested positive, and the Los Angeles Lakers announced two players tested positive. Marcus Smart later went on Twitter to announce that his results came back positive after he was tested five days prior.

On March 25, Christian Wood announced he had "fully recovered" from COVID-19. On the same day, it was reported that a cameraman who worked the Jazz–Pistons game on March 7 at Little Caesars Arena had been infected and was placed in a medically induced coma. He would later recover.

On March 26, it was announced that Maury Hanks, a Detroit Pistons scout, had been hospitalized with COVID-19. He later survived and was discharged from the hospital.

On March 27, the Utah Department of Health cleared the Utah Jazz of COVID-19.

On March 27, ESPN NBA analyst Doris Burke revealed she was symptom-free after testing positive for COVID-19 two weeks earlier. Burke had been experiencing symptoms before calling her scheduled game on March 11 in Dallas.

On April 13, Jacqueline Towns, the mother of Minnesota Timberwolves center Karl-Anthony Towns, died at age 58 of complications of COVID-19 after having previously been placed in a medically induced coma.

On May 22, it was announced that Hall of Famer Patrick Ewing tested positive for COVID-19.

On June 23, it was reported that Denver Nuggets center Nikola Jokić tested positive for COVID-19 a week prior.

On June 26, the NBA and the National Basketball Players Association announced that 16 out of 302 players tested positive for COVID-19 in the first wave of mandatory testing.

== See also ==
- Impact of the COVID-19 pandemic on basketball
- 2020 NBA Bubble
- 2019–20 NBA season
- 2011 NBA lockout - last interruption of an NBA season
- 1998–99 NBA lockout - previous interruption of an NBA season, before the 2011–12 season
