= Jason Rowley =

American business executive (born 1971)

- Born: March 1971 (age 55); Tucson, Arizona, U.S.
- Education: University of Arizona
- Occupations: Businessman, Lawyer, CEO
- Known for: Former CEO of the professional basketball team the Phoenix Suns and ormer CEO and general manager of Phoenix Mercury

Jason Charles Rowley (born March 1971) is an American business executive, lawyer, and managing partner currently working with Carrow Legacy Properties, LLC, as well as working as the CEO of Major League Pickleball's AZ Drive team.

However, he was best known for his work with the professional basketball team the Phoenix Suns, joining the franchise's front office in 2007 after first serving as a lawyer. He went from the team's senior vice president and a general counsel member from 2007 to 2010 to a chief operating officer from 2010 to 2012 to a long-standing role of the team's president and chief executive officer from 2012 until his formal resignation occurred the day before Mat Ishbia and Justin Ishbia became the new team owners on February 6, 2023.

He also previously worked for the basketball team Phoenix Mercury as the team's general manager until the end of the 2013 season, when he resigned from that position and let longtime Suns chief financial officer Jim Pitman take over up until the end of the 2023 season. He also worked with the Mercury WNBA team and the former Northern Arizona Suns NBA G League team alongside the Phoenix Suns behind the scenes, including management duties for the Footprint Center.

== Early life, education and military service ==
Rowley was born in the state of Arizona in the United States and graduated from Salpointe Catholic High School in Tucson. He initially considered going to college out of state in mid-western and southeastern places like Columbus, Ohio and Syracuse, New York, but after experiencing winters in those areas, he reneged on those plans and enrolled with the University of Arizona in 1989. During his time there, he joined the Upsilon Alpha chapter of Phi Gamma Delta, which was a move he considered a key part to his future accomplishments. Rowley later became the charter president of his fraternity in 1993 before graduating from the University of Arizona in 1994.

After graduating from the University of Arizona, Rowley joined the United States Navy out of respect for his grandfathers that served during World War II (one of them serving while out in the Pacific Ocean side of things and the other serving while out in the Atlantic Ocean side of things), with the initial intent of becoming a Navy SEAL.

While he failed at becoming a member of the Navy SEALs when he joined the Navy, he served his duties as an enlisted member of the Commander 3rd Fleet Intelligence Division as an intelligence analyst in 1995 until he was honorably discharged in 1998, with Rowley earning a Purple Heart during his time there and taking the lessons he learned there into the rest of his professional career onward. After being honorably discharged, Rowley returned to the University of Arizona, this time at the James E. Rogers College of Law, to pursue a Juris Doctor for his father, which he earned in 2001.

== Career ==
After law school, Rowley worked with Snell & Wilmer, one of the largest full service business law firms in the Western U.S.A., as a corporate and real estate attorney from 2001 until 2006 to help out in public and private mergers and acquisitions, alongside many other duties.

During his time with Snell & Wilmer, he would help represent Robert Sarver and his ownership group that would own the Phoenix Suns following Jerry Colangelo's sale of the team in 2004. He would also at times go to Washington, D.C. during this period to help protect civil rights, provide legal advice to veterans and low-income individuals, and represent clients in trials that went as high up as the Supreme Court there, as well as teach courses in litigation and appellate advocacy at the Georgetown University Law Center as an adjunct professor there.

Following those years, he would then be hired by the Van Tuyl Group, the largest privately held automotive dealership group in the U.S.A., as a corporate lawyer for a couple of years afterward. While working for the Van Tuyl Group, Rowley managed the negotiation, documentation, and successful conclusions of various real estate acquisitions, divestations, and joint ventures within the group's real estate portfolio. Outside of later works with professional sports teams, he also served with other local charitable and civic organizations, including the Greater Phoenix Leadership, the ASU Walter Cronkite School of Journalism Endowment Board, the Thunderbirds, the Board of Phoenix Suns Charities, and the Board of Downtown Phoenix, Inc., as well as served as the American Heart Association Phoenix Heart Walk Chairman in 2015 and was named the 2011 Phoenix Father of the Year by the Phoenix Father's Day Council. He would also see work with Carrow Legacy Properties, LLC following his resignation from the Phoenix Suns in 2023.

=== Professional sports ===
==== Phoenix Suns basketball ====
Following his departure with the Van Tuyl Group, Rowley was hired by the Phoenix Suns in 2008 during the franchise's 2008–09 season to become a part of the team's general counsel as their new senior vice president. While he served under these roles, he would also act as a chief legal officer for the team, overseeing the legal operatives of the Phoenix Suns, Suns Legacy Properties, Phoenix Mercury, the Legends Entertainment District, and the U.S. Airways Center (now known as the Footprint Center) to make sure things are of operational compliance and legal integrity. He also would help out with the negotiating and detailed drafting of contracts for players, coaches, basketball operations, and executive employment contracts there, as well as help play a role in the 2011 NBA lockout as a lead compliance officer by navigating through the complex regulatory landscapes to contribute to the successful resolution to start up the 2011–12 NBA season.

Following the end of the 2011 lockout, Rowley would be promoted to the role of chief operating officer of the Phoenix Suns franchise for the season, reporting up to Brad Casper, the president of business and non-basketball operations, during that period of time. While working under this promotion, Rowley managed various operations departments involving the team, including negotiating a 10-year, $350 million deal with Fox Sports Arizona (later named Bally Sports Arizona) to help maximize revenue potential while enhancing the team's media presence during that period of time.

Following the end of the lockout season, Rowley would be promoted to the roles of both CEO and President of the Phoenix Suns organization.

He would be given the title of president following the resignation of Brad Casper while working with the team for the rest of his time there also. While under his new roles, he acted as the team's public representative for all of their business, governmental, and community affairs-related engagements, including successful affairs where the Phoenix Suns bought out the Bakersfield Jam NBA Development League team to become the Northern Arizona Suns for the Prescott Valley, Arizona during the late 2010s and the Phoenix Suns were approved to not just build a new training area nearby the Footprint Center for the team called the Verizon 5G Performance Center, but also renovate the Footprint Center near the end of the 2010s and the start of the 2020s.

He was also considered to be the leadership credit to help move the team forward during both the Great Recession and COVID-19 recession periods, with the latter being especially notable for the Suns not only gaining a surprising return to the NBA Finals in 2021 after previously missing out on the playoffs for a decade straight, but helping the state of Arizona with various businesses surviving through the COVID-19 pandemic.

Rowley would remain with the Suns franchise until February 6, 2023, one day before the NBA formally approved the sale of the Phoenix Suns franchise to Mat Ishbia and Justin Ishbia.

==== Phoenix Mercury basketball ====
On December 13, 2013, the Phoenix Mercury announced that Rowley would take part as the team's new president of business operations.

When working with the Mercury, he saw them as a part of the same organization as the Suns franchise in order to make things less messy on the team's end. In his first season working in his new role with the Mercury, Rowley would help lead the team to their third WNBA Finals championship in 2014 with a 3–0 sweep over the Chicago Sky. Not only that, but the Mercury would continue to hold winning records under Rowley's time there until 2019, where they finished with a 15–19 record, though they would still make it to the playoffs despite that record. While he worked as the Mercury's president of basketball operations, they would not miss the playoffs in every season Rowley took over under that role before leaving the team prior to the start of the 2023 season.

==== AZ Drive pickleball ====
Near the end of 2023, Jason Rowley was hired as the CEO of the newly created AZ Drive team for the newly created Major League Pickleball league. He would join in the ownership group alongside the likes of Devin Booker, Dierks Bentley, Larry Fitzgerald, Michael Phelps, and various other people. In AZ Drive's first 2023 season in the MLP, the team finished in 20th place out of 24 teams and finished in 11th place in the Challenger Level ahead of Columbus P.C. in 2023.

In their second 2023 season, the AZ Drive improved to 12th place overall and placed 6th when moving to the Premier Level. Their primary goal is to help promote the sport of pickleball into a greater level of prominence.

== Controversies ==
On November 4, 2021, during the 2021–22 NBA season, the Phoenix Suns, owned by Robert Sarver while Rowley spent his time with the team up until that point, were the subject of a report written by Baxter Holmes on ESPN, which accused Sarver, Rowley, and other members of the front office of racist and misogynistic behaviors. The report was based on interviews with more than 70 current (at the time) and former employees of the Suns.

Sarver and his legal team, including Rowley, denied the vast majority of accusations, citing that there are only a handful of sources on the record and, while the reporter may have reached out to 70 employees, the article provided no evidence that all of them spoke negatively of the organization. Sarver and the Suns welcomed an NBA inquiry to clear up the allegations.

Before the start of the 2022–23 NBA season, Sarver would be suspended from both the NBA and the WNBA for one year and be fined the maximum amount of $10 million due to the information revealed in the independent investigation. Following Sarver's suspension and eventual announcement of his sale, Rowley held an all-employees call addressing the team staff's questions and concerns revolving around the major precedent at hand, including informing people that minority team owner Sam Garvin would be considered the interim governor of the team until a sale officially gets completed. On December 19, 2022, it was revealed that Rowley himself was one of the employees involved in question to have been engaging in similar behaviors that Sarver had done during his tenure as owner, such as verbal abuse of employees, mistreatment of pregnant and postpartum employees, and other instances of both intimidation and retaliation.

Despite that fact, Robert Sarver still held final approval on potentially firing Jason Rowley alongside chief financial officer Jim Pitman (who was also working as the general manager of the Phoenix Mercury at the time) and chief revenue officer Dan Costello from the organization during the season while he still held ownership of the team. Rowley later responded on January 10, 2023 that he would never quit on the team himself.

However, on February 6, one day before the NBA would officially approve of the sale of the Suns and Mercury organizations to Mat Ishbia and Justin Ishbia, Rowley would officially resign from his positions with the Suns and Mercury in what effectively became the final move made under Sam Garvin's interim governorship.
