= Sam Garvin =

American business executive (born 1964)

- Born: August 16, 1964 (age 62); Pittsburgh, Pennsylvania, U.S.
- Education: University of Pittsburgh
- Occupation: Businessman
- Known for: Phoenix Suns (Co-owner)

Sam Garvin (born August 16, 1964) is an American business executive and administrator who is the current chief executive officer (CEO) of the Garvin Promotion Group and co-owner of the RCD Mallorca La Liga Spanish football team.

Previously, Garvin served as an acting governor of the Phoenix Suns from September 15, 2022, until February 7, 2023, when the sale of the team to Mat and Justin Ishbia was finalized; he had stepped in for Robert Sarver for what was to be the entire 2022-23 NBA season.

== Early life and education ==
Sam Garvin was born in Pittsburgh, Pennsylvania. He was educated at the University of Pittsburgh, where he earned a Bachelor of Arts degree in political science and German studies. Later, he studied at the Thunderbird School and graduated in 1988.

== Career ==
During Ronald Reagan's administration, Garvin worked as a staff assistant in the White House for the Presidential Commission of the German-American Tri-Centennial. After working under Reagan's administration, Garvin then worked for Heinz as a sales merchandiser, where he learned the marketing of packaged goods from the ground up. In 1989, Garvin created the Continental Promotion Group, a mail-in rebate and consumer promotions company, in Scottsdale, Arizona and served as its CEO and chairman until the time he sold his shares off in 2005. Due to his work for the Continental Promotion Group, he was recognized by the Phoenix Business Journal as one of Arizona's "Top 40 Under 40" most influential business leaders in 1998, was recognized by then-Arizona Governor Jane Dee Hull with the "Governor’s Spirit of Success" award in 1999, and was twice nominated for Ernst & Young's "Entrepreneur of the Year" award.

In 2004, Garvin gave $60 million to the Thunderbird School of Global Management as a donation, with the school later being renamed after him from 2004 until 2007 as "Thunderbird, the Garvin School of International Management" before changing their name in 2007 as the "Thunderbird School of Global Management". However, only a portion of the pledge by Garvin was paid. Also in 2004, he acquired a stake in the Phoenix Suns NBA organization after Robert Sarver's group purchased the team from longtime associate and owner Jerry Colangelo. From 2007 until 2022, he's also served as an alternate governor of the team. Additionally, between 2004 and 2010, he was a member of Suns Charities Board.

On September 15, 2022, it was announced that Garvin would become the interim team governor of the Phoenix Suns, replacing Robert Sarver's position there for the majority of the 2022–23 NBA season. Previously, he has served as the vice-chairman of the Phoenix Suns. His first major move as acting team governor was promoting James Jones from general manager to president of basketball operations on November 20, 2022. He then approved of point guard Saben Lee (previously a part of the Suns' preseason team in that same season) signing multiple 10-day contracts on January 11 & 21, 2023, before signing him to a two-way contract and waiving Duane Washington Jr. on February 1, 2023. In what became his final announcement as interim team governor, Garvin announced via e-mail that Suns team president and CEO Jason Rowley (who was with the team's front office since 2007 and held his positions in question since 2012, as well as previously held the general manager position for the Phoenix Mercury) resigned from his position with the team on February 6, 2023, after previously being considered safe for his position earlier in the season.

On February 7, 2023, the ownership of Phoenix Suns and Phoenix Mercury franchises were transferred to a group led by Mat Ishbia and his older brother Justin Ishbia, with the minority ownership maintained by Sam Garvin. He is also the current vice chairman and NBA alternate governor of the Phoenix Suns.

On July 1, 2023, the Spanish La Liga (Primera Division) team RCD Mallorca announced that American billionaire Sam Garvin, participating with Andy Kohlberg, increased their investment in RCD Mallorca and was elected to the Board of La Liga team RCD Mallorca. Previously, Sam Garvin played a significant role in facilitating the ownership transition of the Phoenix Suns basketball team from Robert Sarver to Mat Ishbia, while maintaining a minority ownership stake himself. Now, as a member of the Real Mallorca board, Garvin collaborates with Andy Kohlberg, former soccer player Graeme Le Saux, and Glenn Richard Carlson, who assumed the role following Steve Nash's appointment as the head coach of the Brooklyn Nets in the NBA.

In May 2024, Garvin acquired a partial ownership stake in Portland Thorns FC alongside other investors including Tim Boyle, CEO of Columbia Sportswear and Nehal Raj, co-managing partner of TPG Capital.

Subsequently, Garvin also joined the Board of Directors of the club.

== Awards and recognition ==
- Governor's Spirit of Success (1999)
- Thunderbird School of Global Management was renamed after his contributions to the school. (2004–2007)
