= Ishbia =

Ishbia is a surname. Notable people with the surname include:

- Jeff Ishbia, founder of United Wholesale Mortgage
- Justin Ishbia, American billionaire
- Mat Ishbia (born 1980), American billionaire
