= Larry Fitzgerald =

American football player (born 1983)

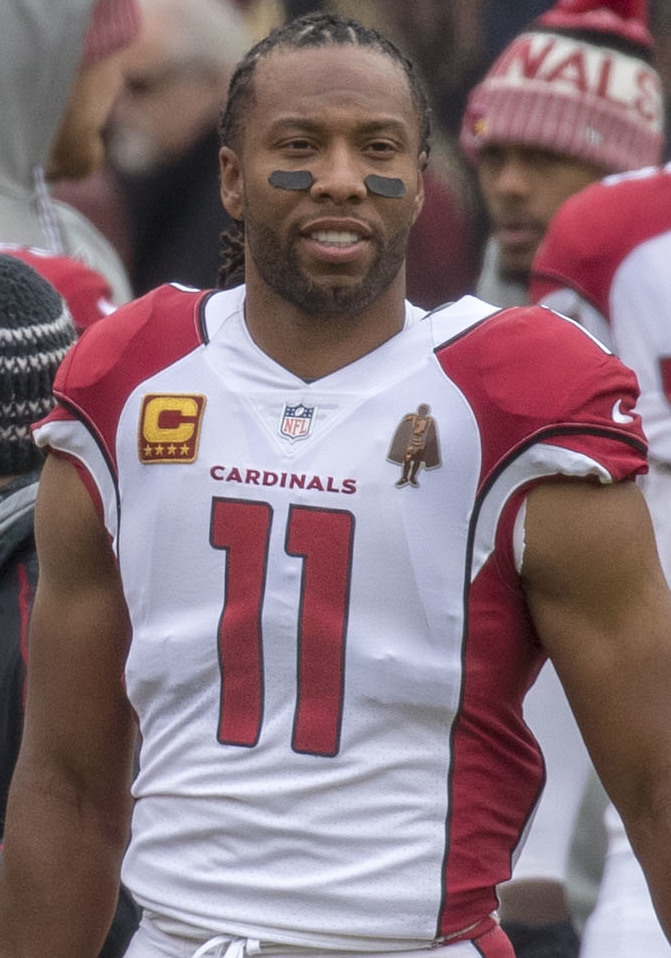
- Fitzgerald with the Arizona Cardinals in 2017

No. 11
- Position: Wide receiver

Personal information
- Born: August 31, 1983 (age 43); Minneapolis, Minnesota, U.S.
- Listed height: 6 ft 3 in (1.91 m)
- Listed weight: 218 lb (99 kg)

Career information
- High school: Academy of Holy Angels (Richfield, Minnesota)
- College: Pittsburgh (2002–2003)
- NFL draft: 2004: 1st round, 3rd overall pick

Career history
- Arizona Cardinals (2004–2020)

Awards and highlights
- First-team All-Pro (2008); 2× Second-team All-Pro (2009, 2011); Walter Payton NFL Man of the Year (2016); 11× Pro Bowl (2005, 2007–2013, 2015–2017); 2× NFL receptions leader (2005, 2016); 2× NFL receiving touchdowns leader (2008, 2009); NFL 2010s All-Decade Team; NFL 100th Anniversary All-Time Team; Arizona Cardinals No. 11 retired; Arizona Cardinals Ring of Honor; Biletnikoff Award (2003); Walter Camp Award (2003); Chic Harley Award (2003); Paul Warfield Trophy (2003); Unanimous All-American (2003); NCAA receiving yards leader (2003); NCAA receiving touchdowns leader (2003); Big East Offensive Player of the Year (2003); First-team All-Big East (2003); First-team AP All-Time All-American (2025); Pittsburgh Panthers No. 1 retired; NFL records: Most receiving yards in a postseason: 546 (2008); Most receiving touchdowns in a postseason: 7 (2008)

Career NFL statistics
- Receptions: 1,432
- Receiving yards: 17,492
- Receiving touchdowns: 121
- Stats at Pro Football Reference
- Pro Football Hall of Fame
- College Football Hall of Fame

Larry Darnell Fitzgerald Jr. (born August 31, 1983) is an American former professional football player who was a wide receiver for 17 seasons with the Arizona Cardinals of the National Football League (NFL). He played college football for the Pittsburgh Panthers, earning unanimous All-American honors in 2003. Fitzgerald was selected by the Cardinals with the third overall pick in the 2004 NFL draft. He is widely considered by fans, coaches and peers to be one of the greatest receivers in NFL history.

Fitzgerald was selected for the Pro Bowl eleven times. He was named first-team All-Pro in 2008 and second-team All-Pro twice in 2009 and 2011. He is second in NFL career receiving yards, second in career receptions, and sixth in career receiving touchdowns. He was named to the NFL 2010s All-Decade Team and NFL 100th Anniversary All-Time Team. He was inducted into the Pro Football Hall of Fame in 2026 in his first year of eligibility.

Fitzgerald became a minority owner of the Phoenix Suns of the National Basketball Association (NBA) in 2020.

== Early life ==
As a teenager, Fitzgerald worked as a ball boy for the Minnesota Vikings under coach Dennis Green. "You know just being around your childhood idols," Fitzgerald said in a 2015 interview. "Coach Green gave me an opportunity of a lifetime to be around Cris Carter, Warren Moon, Joey Browner, Randy Moss, and Robert Smith. I can go on and on. To see their work ethic and dedication to their craft, that was really an eye-opening experience for a 14-year-old, 15-year-old. It was like on-the-job training almost."

Fitzgerald attended and played high school football at the Academy of Holy Angels in Richfield, Minnesota. While there, he was a two-time first-team All-State wide receiver. Fitzgerald did not meet NCAA requirements to play football as a freshman, so he spent a year at Valley Forge Military Academy in Pennsylvania.

== College career ==
Fitzgerald attended the University of Pittsburgh, where he played for the Pittsburgh Panthers football team under head coach Walt Harris. He was widely considered one of the best wide receivers in college football from 2002 to 2003. While Larry Fitzgerald played two seasons at the University of Pittsburgh, he did not graduate from that academic institution. He was later featured in numerous public advertising campaigns touting his graduation from the University of Phoenix, which does not have any sports programs that participate in NCAA Division 1 sports competitions.

=== 2002 ===
In his freshman season, Fitzgerald was an instant contributor. In the second game of the season against #20 Texas A&M, he had ten receptions for 103 yards in the 14–12 loss. Three weeks later, against Toledo, he had six receptions for 121 yards and his first two collegiate touchdowns in the 37–19 victory. On November 2, Fitzgerald had another stellar outing against #3 Virginia Tech with five receptions for 105 yards and three touchdowns in the 28–21 victory. In the last regular season game on November 30, he had 11 receptions for 159 yards and two touchdowns against #24 West Virginia in the 24–17 loss. Pitt finished with an 8–4 record and qualified for a bowl game. In the 2002 Insight Bowl, Fitzgerald had five receptions for 88 yards and a touchdown in the 38–13 victory over Oregon State. Overall, in the 2002 season, Fitzgerald had a Big-East conference leading 69 receptions for 1,005 yards and twelve touchdowns.

=== 2003 ===
Fitzgerald had a stellar sophomore season in 2003. He began the campaign against Kent State with six receptions for 123 yards and three touchdowns in the 43–3 victory. In the next game against Ball State, he had seven receptions for 124 yards and two touchdowns in the 42–21 victory. Fitzgerald once again put out a great effort in the following game against Toledo with 12 receptions for 201 yards and a touchdown in the 35–31 loss. In the next game against Texas A&M, Fitzgerald had his fourth consecutive game with at least 100 receiving yards with seven receptions for 135 yards and three touchdowns in the 37–26 victory. Two weeks later, against Notre Dame, he was held under 100 yards for the first time but still had five receptions for 79 yards and two touchdowns in the 20–14 loss. Fitzgerald bounced back in the next game against Rutgers with eight receptions for a season-high 207 yards and two touchdowns in the 42–32 victory. Fitzgerald's hot streak continued in the next game against Syracuse, where he had eight receptions for 149 yards and two touchdowns in the 34–14 victory. Fitzgerald's performance against the Orange was his fourth consecutive game with at least two touchdowns.

Fitzgerald started the month of November with seven receptions for 156 yards and a touchdown in a 24–13 victory over Boston College. In the following week against #5 Virginia Tech, he had eight receptions for 108 yards and a touchdown in the 31–28 upset victory. Fitzgerald added another great performance against West Virginia in the following week with nine receptions for 185 yards and two touchdowns in the 52–31 loss. In the following week against Temple, he had seven receptions for 102 yards and two touchdowns as the Panthers won 30–16. Fitzgerald's performance against the Owls was his sixth consecutive game with at least 100 receiving yards. Fitzgerald's impressive streak ended the following week against #10 Miami with three receptions for 26 yards and a touchdown in the 28–14 loss. Despite having a season-low in yardage, Fitzgerald ended up recording his 12th consecutive game with at least one touchdown reception in the 2003 season, and 18th straight game with a touchdown reception dating back to the previous season. Pitt finished with an 8–4 record in the regular season and qualified for a bowl game. In the 2003 Continental Tire Bowl, Fitzgerald had five receptions for 77 yards against Virginia in the final game of his collegiate career, a 23–16 loss. He was held without a touchdown for the first time in 18 collegiate games.

Overall, Fitzgerald led the Big East conference with 92 receptions for an NCAA-leading 1,672 yards and 22 touchdowns in the 2003 season.

After his sophomore season, Fitzgerald was recognized as the best player in the NCAA with the 2003 Walter Camp Award and the Touchdown Club of Columbus's Chic Harley Award, and as the nation's outstanding receiver in college football with the 2003 Biletnikoff Award and the Touchdown Club's Paul Warfield Award. He was a unanimous All-American selection in 2003 and a runner-up for the prestigious Heisman Trophy, given to the most outstanding player in college football; Oklahoma's Jason White won the award that year with 1,481 total points to Fitzgerald's 1,353.

In just 26 games in his collegiate career, Fitzgerald caught 161 passes for 2,677 yards and set a new Pitt record with 34 receiving touchdowns. He was the first player in school history with back-to-back 1,000-yard receiving seasons, and his 14 games with at least 100 yards receiving broke Antonio Bryant's previous all-time Panthers record of 13. Fitzgerald's 18 straight games with at least one touchdown reception is an NCAA record.

On July 1, 2013, Fitzgerald's #1 jersey was retired by the University of Pittsburgh. Fitzgerald was the ninth Pittsburgh player to receive this honor. In 2021, Fitzgerald was ranked second on ESPN's list of the 50 greatest college football wide receivers of the past 50 years.

== Professional career ==
Pre-draft measurables
Height	Weight	Arm length	Hand span	40-yard dash	20-yard shuttle	Three-cone drill	Vertical jump	Broad jump	Wonderlic
6 ft 2 7/8 in (1.90 m)	225 lb (102 kg)	32 1/8 in (0.82 m)	9 7/8 in (0.25 m)	4.47 s	4.27 s	6.97 s	35.0 in (0.89 m)	10 ft 1 in (3.07 m)	18
All values from NFL Combine/Pittsburgh's Pro Day

Although Fitzgerald had played at Pitt for only two years without redshirting, he petitioned the NFL to allow him to enter the NFL draft, as he had left his high school, Academy of Holy Angels, during his senior year to attend Valley Forge Military Academy. The NFL granted an exception to allow Fitzgerald to enter the draft, as Fitzgerald had convinced the NFL that the time he spent at VFMA, combined with his time at Pitt, was the minimum three years removed from high school to make him eligible for the draft. Although former Ohio State running back Maurice Clarett was suing the NFL at the time to overturn the rule (a case Clarett initially won, but it was later overturned on appeal), the NFL considered Fitzgerald's case separate from Clarett's.

After his tremendous sophomore year, Fitzgerald was selected third overall in the 2004 NFL draft by the Arizona Cardinals, whose then coach, Dennis Green, knew Fitzgerald from his time as a Vikings ball boy. He was the first wide receiver to be selected in the 2004 NFL draft. In addition, he was the first of six Pitt Panthers to be selected that year.

=== 2004 ===
Fitzgerald made his NFL debut against the St. Louis Rams in the season opener on September 12. In the 17–10 loss, he had four receptions for 70 yards. In the fifth game of the season on October 10, he had his first career touchdown reception, a 24-yard pass from Josh McCown, against the San Francisco 49ers. On December 19, against the St. Louis Rams, Fitzgerald became the youngest player at 21 years and 110 days, to record at least two touchdown receptions in a single game. His record has since been broken by Aaron Hernandez of the New England Patriots in 2010 and Mike Evans of the Tampa Bay Buccaneers in 2014. He followed up his historic performance in the next game in Week 16 against the Seattle Seahawks, in which he had four receptions for 70 yards and two touchdowns in the 24–21 loss.

Fitzgerald finished his rookie year with 59 receptions for 780 yards and eight touchdowns as the Cardinals missed the playoffs with a 6–10 record.

=== 2005 ===
Fitzgerald started his second NFL season catching 13 receptions for a former career-high 155 yards and a touchdown in a 42–19 loss to the New York Giants in the season opener on September 11. Fitzgerald's season was strong throughout, finding the endzone in ten separate games and totaling seven games with over 100 receiving yards. Fitzgerald and the Cardinals missed the playoffs with a 6–10 record.

In 2005, Fitzgerald led the NFL with 103 receptions for 1,409 yards, which ranked fourth in the NFL, and ten touchdowns, which ranked fifth in the NFL. He was named to his first Pro Bowl. Fitzgerald teamed with Anquan Boldin to create one of the most productive wide receiver tandems in the NFL. In 2005, Fitzgerald and Boldin became only the second tandem from the same team, the first tandem being Herman Moore and Brett Perriman of the Detroit Lions in 1995, to each catch over 100 passes and top the 1,400-yard mark.

=== 2006 ===
Fitzgerald started his third NFL season with nine receptions for 133 yards in a 34–27 victory over the San Francisco 49ers. He had his first touchdown of the season in Week 3, 14–16 loss to the St. Louis Rams. He sustained a hamstring injury and missed three games. He returned against the Dallas Cowboys on November 12 in a 27–10 defeat. Two weeks later, he had 11 receptions for a career-high 172 yards against the Minnesota Vikings in a 31–26 loss. He closed out the 2006 season with four receiving touchdowns in the last five games.

Overall, Fitzgerald finished the 2006 season with 69 receptions for 946 yards and six touchdowns as the Cardinals finished the year with a 5–11 record.

=== 2007 ===
In the Cardinals' fourth game, Fitzgerald had ten receptions for 120 yards against the Pittsburgh Steelers in a 21–14 victory. In the next game, he had his first touchdown of the season against the St. Louis Rams in a nine-catch, 136-yard performance in the 34–31 victory. On November 11, he had eight receptions for 74 yards and two touchdowns against the Detroit Lions in a 31–21 victory. Two weeks later, he had nine receptions for 156 yards and two touchdowns against the San Francisco 49ers in the 37–31 loss. In the regular season finale against the Rams, he had 11 receptions for 171 yards and two touchdowns in a 48–19 victory. Fitzgerald and the Cardinals finished with an 8–8 record.

As part of his Pro Bowl season, Fitzgerald caught 100 passes for 1,409 yards and 10 touchdowns. Following the 2007 season, he signed a four-year, $40 million contract extension with Arizona. While still under contract at the time, performance bonuses forced the team's hand into a massive extension. Fitzgerald's numbers earned him the nickname "Sticky Fingers" and "The Best Hands in the NFL" in local media.

=== 2008: Super Bowl XLIII ===
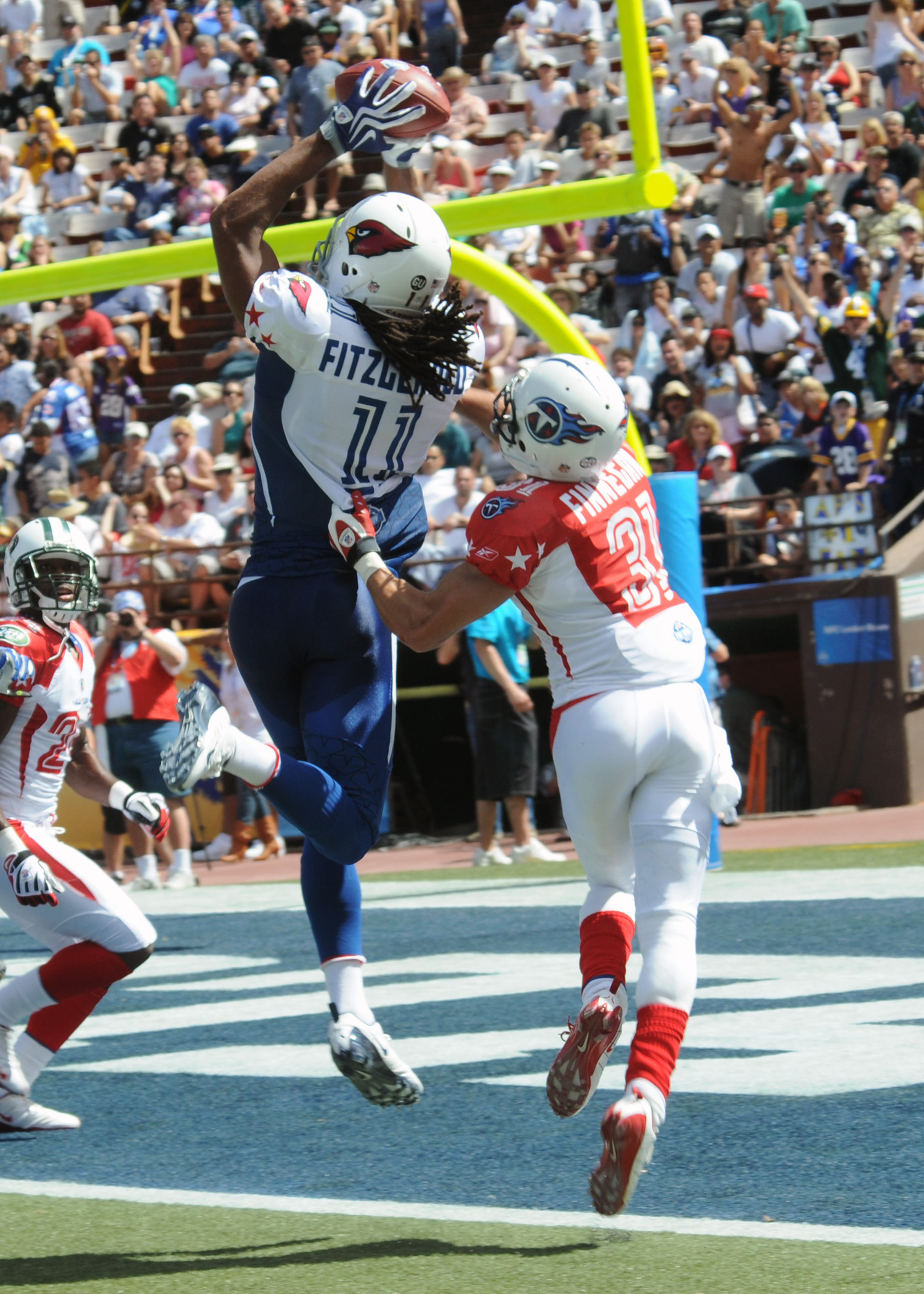
Fitzgerald catches a touchdown at the 2009 Pro Bowl

The 2008 season marked a huge year for Fitzgerald in terms of individual accomplishment and team success. He totaled seven games going over the 100-yard mark, including two games eclipsing the 150-yard barrier. In addition, he had three games where he caught two touchdown passes.

Fitzgerald finished the regular season with 96 receptions for 1,431 yards and a league-leading 12 touchdowns. For the first time in his career, the Cardinals finished with a winning record at 9–7 and won the NFC West, giving Arizona their first home playoff game since 1947.

In his playoff debut, Fitzgerald had six receptions for 101 yards and a touchdown in a 30–24 victory over the Atlanta Falcons in the Wild Card Round. In the Divisional Round, he had eight receptions for 166 yards in the 33–13 upset victory over the second-seeded Carolina Panthers. During the NFC Championship for the 2008 NFL season, Fitzgerald tied an NFL record with three touchdown receptions in a playoff game. His three touchdown catches occurred in the first half; he became the first player in NFL history to accomplish that feat in a conference championship game. As a result of the 32–25 victory over the Eagles, Fitzgerald and the Cardinals represented the NFC in Super Bowl XLIII. During Super Bowl XLIII, Fitzgerald caught two touchdown passes in the game. Late in the fourth quarter, Fitzgerald had a 64-yard touchdown reception from Kurt Warner to go ahead 23–20, but the score did not hold as the Pittsburgh Steelers scored a touchdown with only 35 seconds remaining to go ahead 27–23, which was the game's final score. Fitzgerald set a single postseason record with 546 receiving yards, 30 receptions, and seven touchdown receptions, surpassing Jerry Rice's records of the 1988–89 NFL playoffs.

Fitzgerald followed up his great 2008 season by catching two more touchdown passes in the 2009 Pro Bowl, earning him MVP honors. After the Pro Bowl was over, it was revealed that Fitzgerald had been playing at least the whole postseason with a broken left thumb as well as torn cartilage in the same hand. It is speculated that Fitzgerald has had this injury since November 5, 2008, when he showed up on the injury report with an injured thumb. After his record-breaking postseason, capped by his Pro Bowl MVP award, many analysts, including NFL Network's Jamie Dukes, regarded Fitzgerald as one of the best receivers in the NFL. He was named as a First-team All Pro for the 2008 season.

=== 2009 ===
In the fourth game of the season, Fitzgerald had five receptions for 79 yards and two touchdowns in a 28–21 victory over the Houston Texans. The following week, he had 13 receptions for 100 yards and a touchdown in a 27–3 victory over the Seattle Seahawks. On November 8 against the Chicago Bears, he had nine receptions for 123 yards and two touchdowns in a 41–21 victory. On December 6, he had eight receptions for 143 yards and a touchdown in a 30–17 victory the Minnesota Vikings. He finished out the 2009 regular season with a receiving touchdown in the last three games. Overall, he had 97 receptions for 1,092 yards and a league-leading 13 touchdowns as the Cardinals went 10–6 and returned to the playoffs.

In the Wild Card Round, he had six receptions for 82 receiving yards and two touchdown receptions, both of which came in the third quarter, against the Green Bay Packers in a 51–45 win. However, the Cardinals were eliminated the next week by the eventual Super Bowl XLIV champion New Orleans Saints by a score of 45–14 in the Divisional Round. He was named to his third consecutive and fourth career Pro Bowl for his efforts in 2009.

=== 2010 ===
Fitzgerald started the 2010 season recording a go-ahead 21-yard receiving touchdown in the fourth quarter against the St. Louis Rams in a 17–13 victory. On October 31, in Week 8, he had six receptions for 72 yards and two touchdowns against the Tampa Bay Buccaneers in a 38–35 loss. On the season, he totaled three games with over 100 receiving yards. Fitzgerald and the Cardinals failed to return to the playoffs with a 5–11 record.

Overall, in the 2010 season, Fitzgerald recorded 90 receptions, which ranked fifth in the NFL, for 1,137 yards and six touchdowns. After the season, he was named to his fifth Pro Bowl, and his fourth in a row. He finished ranked as the 14th best player in the league among his peers on the NFL Top 100 Players of 2011.

=== 2011 ===
On August 20, 2011, Fitzgerald signed an 8-year, $120 million contract with the Cardinals, tying him with Richard Seymour as the fifth highest paid player in the NFL at the time.

Fitzgerald had a consistently strong season in 2011. He went over the 100-yard mark six times, including three games where he just missed the 150-yard mark. On November 13, in Week 10, he had seven receptions for 146 yards and two touchdowns in a 21–17 victory over the Philadelphia Eagles. His efforts against the Eagles garnered him NFC Offensive Player of the Week honors. A few weeks later, he had seven receptions for 149 yards and a touchdown against the San Francisco 49ers in a 21–19 victory in Week 14. The Cardinals finished with an 8–8 record and missed the playoffs.

Overall, Fitzgerald had another stellar season, catching 80 passes for 1,411 yards and eight touchdowns and setting a personal record of 17.6 yards per catch. Fitzgerald's accomplishments were recognized by an All-Pro second-team selection as well as his sixth Pro Bowl selection. He finished ranked as the seventh best player in the league among his peers on the NFL Top 100 Players of 2012 list.

=== 2012 ===
In the 2012 season, Fitzgerald had two games going over the 100-yard mark. One of which was In Week 3, when he had nine receptions for 114 yards to go with one touchdown and earned NFC Offensive Player of the Week honors against the Philadelphia Eagles.

Overall, on the season, Fitzgerald had 71 receptions for 798 yards and four touchdowns as the Cardinals went 5–11 and missed the playoffs. He was named to his sixth consecutive and seventh career Pro Bowl. He finished ranked 22nd by his fellow players on the NFL Top 100 Players of 2013 list.

Following the 2012 football season, Fitzgerald was named as the Cardinals' Walter Payton NFL Man of the Year and was one of three finalists for the Walter Payton NFL Man of the Year Award.

=== 2013 ===
In the offseason, Fitzgerald turned 30. He started the 2013 season with eight receptions for 80 yards and two touchdowns against the St. Louis Rams. In the sixth game of the season, he recorded his first performance of the season topping 100 yards against the San Francisco 49ers. In the game, he had six receptions for 117 yards and a touchdown. On November 24, against the Indianapolis Colts, he had five receptions for 52 yards and two touchdowns. Two weeks later, Fitzgerald caught all 12 of his targets for 96 yards and a touchdown in a 30–10 victory over the Rams. In the regular season finale against the 49ers, he had six receptions for 113 yards.

Overall, on the season, Fitzgerald had 82 receptions for 954 yards and ten touchdowns as the Cardinals improved to a 10–6 record from the previous season of 5–11. However, they still missed out on the playoffs. For his 2013 season, he was named to his seventh consecutive and eighth overall Pro Bowl. He finished ranked 38th by his peers on the NFL Top 100 Players of 2014 list.

=== 2014 ===
Fitzgerald was a stable part of the Cardinals' offense in 2014. However, the lack of stability at the quarterback position put a hindrance on the team's overall performance as four different quarterbacks saw time for the Cardinals that year. He started his 11th professional season against the San Diego Chargers. In the game, he only had one reception for 22 yards. He did not have his first touchdown of the season until the fifth game of the season against the Washington Redskins. On October 26 against the Philadelphia Eagles, he had seven receptions for a season-high 160 yards and a touchdown, which was a career-high 80-yard reception, to earn his third career NFC Offensive Player of the Week award. Two weeks later, he had nine receptions for 112 yards against the St. Louis Rams.

Overall, on the 2014 season, Fitzgerald had 63 receptions for 784 yards and two touchdowns as the Cardinals went 11–5 and returned to the playoffs.

In the Wild Card Round against the Carolina Panthers, Fitzgerald had three receptions for 31 yards in the 27–16 defeat. He was ranked 68th by his fellow players on the NFL Top 100 Players of 2015 list.

=== 2015 ===
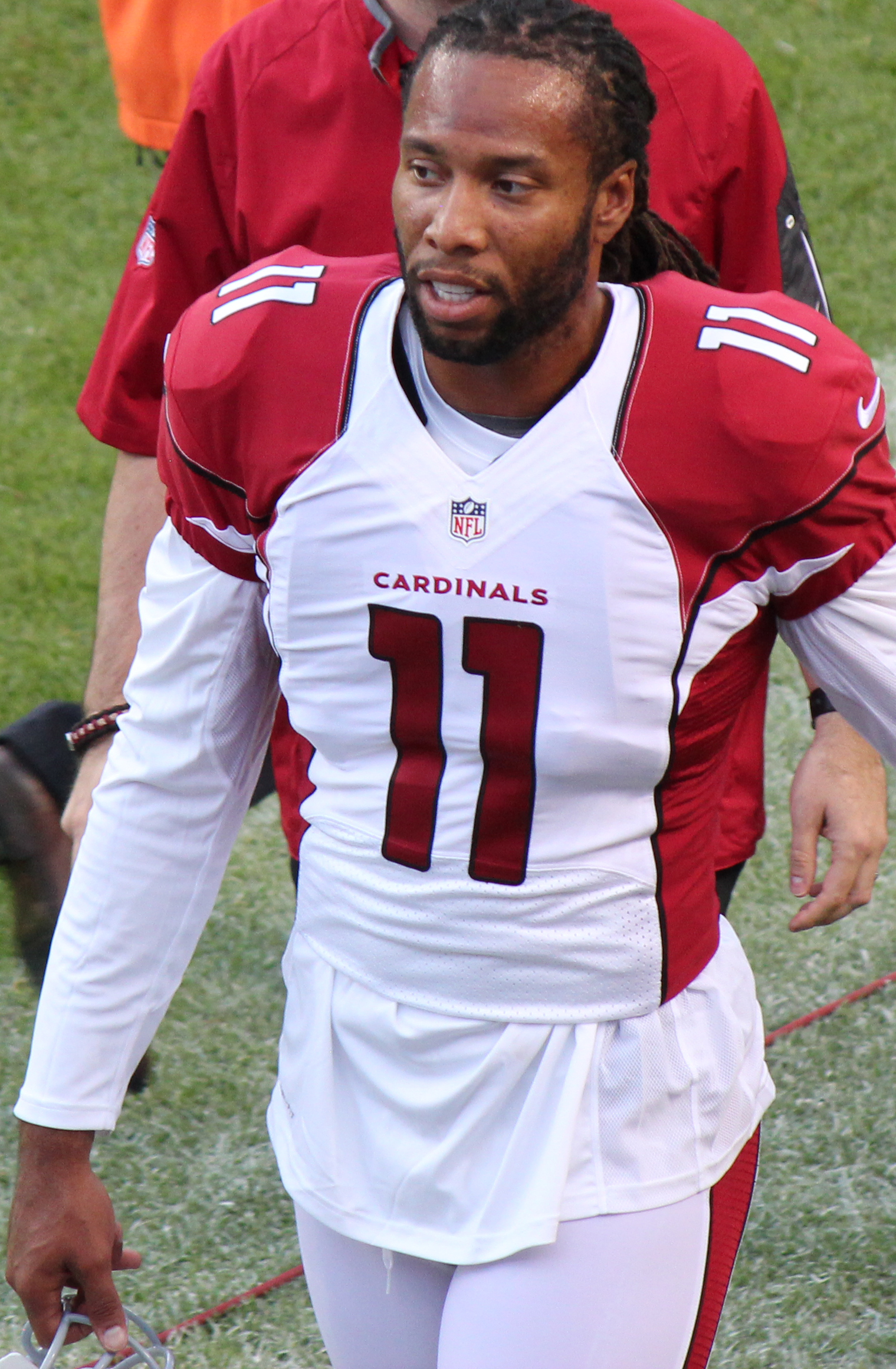
Fitzgerald during the 2015 season

On February 18, 2015, Fitzgerald was signed to a new multi-year contract worth at least $11 million guaranteed over the next two seasons.

In Week 2, in the 48–23 victory over Chicago Bears, Fitzgerald had 112 receiving yards and caught three touchdown passes, the first time he accomplished the feat during the regular season in his career. For his performance, he was named NFC Offensive Player of the Week for the fourth time in his career. In the next game, he had nine receptions for 134 yards and two touchdowns against the San Francisco 49ers. On November 15, he had ten receptions for 130 yards against the Seattle Seahawks. In Week 13, he became the youngest player to reach 1,000 career receptions; Dallas Cowboys tight end Jason Witten joined him the same day as the 11th and 12th players to reach this milestone. He closed out the 2015 regular season with a receiving touchdown in the last two games against the Green Bay Packers and Seattle Seahawks. The Cardinals finished with a 13–3 record and won the NFC West.

For the 2015 season, Fitzgerald had 109 catches, which was tied for fifth in the NFL, for 1,215 yards and nine touchdowns. For his accomplishments during the 2015 season, Fitzgerald was selected to the Pro Bowl for the ninth time. He was ranked 27th on the NFL Top 100 Players of 2016.

On January 16, 2016, Fitzgerald helped his quarterback Carson Palmer record his first playoff win with eight catches for a franchise-record 176 yards in the NFC Divisional Round game against the Green Bay Packers in a Week 16 rematch. Fitzgerald was the Cardinals' entire offense in overtime, with a 75-yard reception to open overtime, and a five-yard touchdown reception from Palmer two plays later, which resulted in a 26–20 win. He was held to four receptions for 30 yards in the NFC Championship against the Carolina Panthers. The Cardinals' season ended with a 49–15 loss.

=== 2016 ===
On August 5, 2016, Fitzgerald signed a one-year, $11 million contract extension with the Cardinals.

On September 11, 2016, Fitzgerald had eight receptions for 81 yards and two touchdowns, while becoming the 10th player to reach 100 career touchdowns, in the season-opening 23–21 loss to the New England Patriots on NBC Sunday Night Football. In the fifth game of the season, he had six receptions for 81 yards and two touchdowns in the 33–21 loss to the San Francisco 49ers. On November 13, he had 12 receptions for 132 yards in another strong outing against the 49ers in a 23–20 victory. The Cardinals finished with a 7–8–1 record and missed the playoffs.

At the end of the 2016 season, Fitzgerald led the NFL in receptions for the second time with 107, and had 1,023 receiving yards with six receiving touchdowns. He moved from 11th to 3rd on the all-time career reception list, and ended the season ninth all-time in receiving yards. He was named to his tenth career Pro Bowl. He was ranked 45th by his peers on the NFL Top 100 Players of 2017.

=== 2017 ===
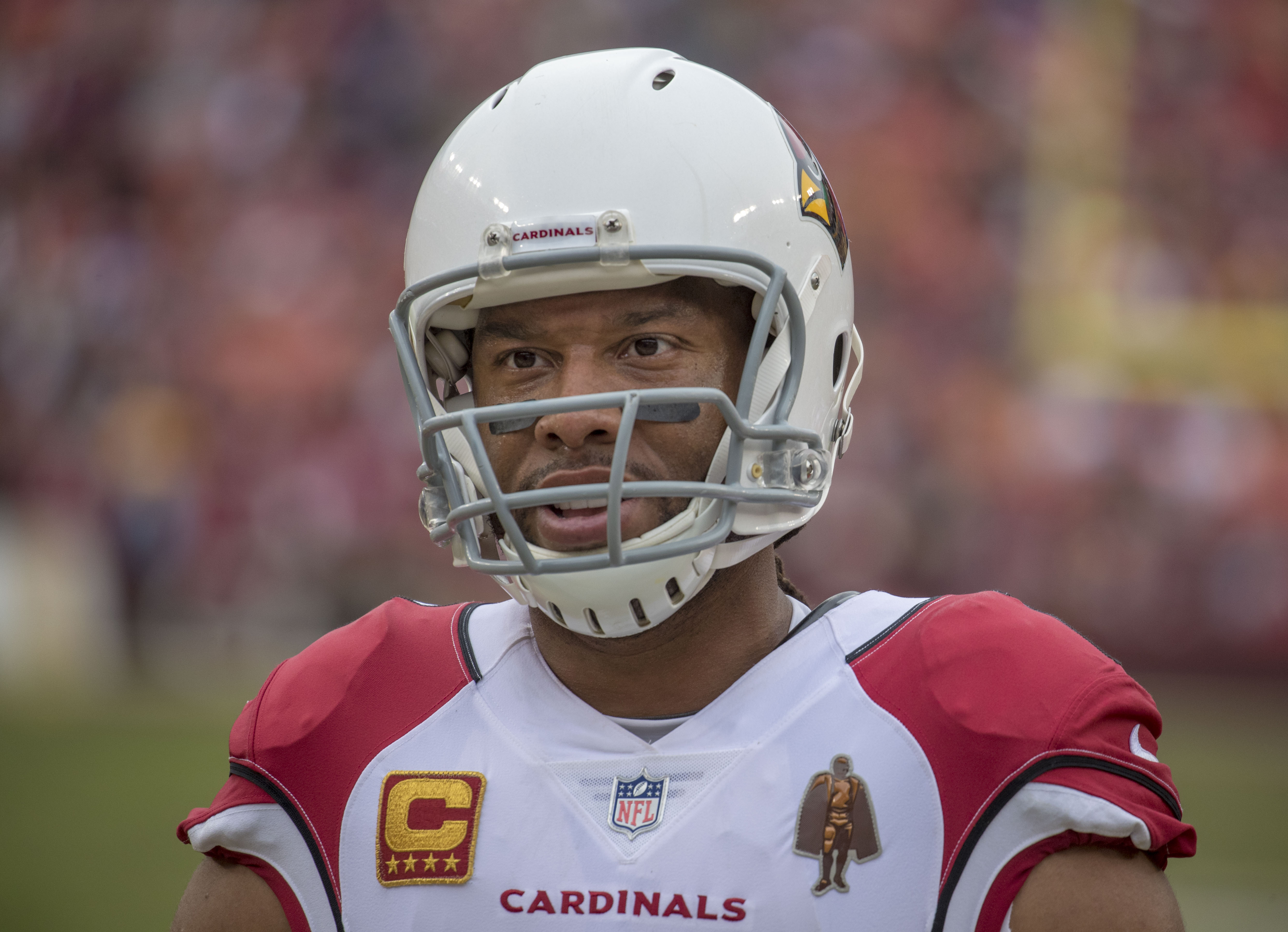
Fitzgerald in 2017

With the retirements of Steve Smith and Anquan Boldin at the end of 2016, the 34-year-old Fitzgerald entered the 2017 season as the career leader in receptions and receiving yards among active players. In Week 3, on Monday Night Football, Fitzgerald had 149 receiving yards on 13 receptions, which tied his career high, and a touchdown in a 28–17 loss to the Dallas Cowboys, his highest output in almost three years. His 13 receptions tied Jarvis Landry's performance in Week 2 for the most receptions in a single game by any player in the 2017 season. The next week, he caught a 19-yard sudden death touchdown from Palmer with 0:31 left in overtime to defeat the San Francisco 49ers by a score of 18–15. In Week 6, Fitzgerald had 10 receptions for 138 yards and a touchdown in a 38–33 victory over Tampa Bay, and 10 receptions for 113 yards in Week 10's Thursday Night Football 22–16 loss to Seattle, joining Antonio Brown as the only players with three games of 10+ receptions in 2017, and briefly passing Brown for the league lead in receptions. On November 17, 2017, Fitzgerald signed a one-year contract extension with the Cardinals worth $11 million through the 2018 season. In Week 13, against the Los Angeles Rams, Fitzgerald had 10 receptions, his fourth game in double digits, for 98 yards and his fifth touchdown in the 32–16 loss. In Week 16, against the New York Giants, he had nine receptions for 119 yards and a touchdown. In addition, he completed a 21-yard pass in the 23–0 victory. He tied his career-best with 109 receptions, finishing second to Jarvis Landry, and finished eighth in the NFL with 1,156 receiving yards. On December 19, 2017, Fitzgerald was named to his 11th Pro Bowl. However, it was later announced that Doug Baldwin of the Seattle Seahawks would replace Fitzgerald. The Cardinals finished with an 8–8 record and missed the playoffs. He was ranked 27th on the NFL Top 100 Players of 2018.

=== 2018 ===
In Week 1, Fitzgerald recorded seven receptions for 76 yards in a 24–6 loss to the Washington Redskins. Nursing a sore hamstring, he failed to reach 50 yards in any of his next six games, and did not record a touchdown reception until a Week 7 45–10 loss to the Denver Broncos on Thursday Night Football. In Week 8, he had eight receptions for 102 yards with a touchdown and a two-point conversion in the 18–15 victory over the San Francisco 49ers. In Week 10, in a 26–14 loss to the Kansas City Chiefs after recording six receptions for 50 yards, Fitzgerald reached 15,952 career receiving yards, passing Terrell Owens for second on the all-time list behind only Jerry Rice. In Week 11 against the Oakland Raiders, Fitzgerald made two catches for 23 yards which were both touchdowns in the 23–21 loss.

In Week 14, against the Detroit Lions, Fitzgerald set an NFL record for most receptions with one team with 1,282. The gloves he used in that game and the ball he caught were sent to the Pro Football Hall of Fame. In Week 16, Fitzgerald threw the first touchdown pass of his NFL career, a 32-yard pass to David Johnson for the first Cardinals score in the eventual 31–9 loss to the Los Angeles Rams. In addition, Fitzgerald had six receptions for 53 yards. He finished the 3–13 season as the Cardinals leading receiver with 69 receptions for a career-low 734 yards with six receiving touchdowns. Fitzgerald was ranked 60th by his fellow players on the NFL Top 100 Players of 2019.

=== 2019 ===
On January 23, 2019, Fitzgerald announced he would return for the 2019 season, and signed a one-year contract extension with the Cardinals. In Week 1 against the Detroit Lions, Fitzgerald caught eight passes for 113 yards and one touchdown from rookie quarterback Kyler Murray in the 27–27 tie. In Week 2, a 23–17 loss to the Baltimore Ravens, he had five receptions for 104 receiving yards for his first back-to-back games with over 100 receiving yards since Weeks 2–3 of the 2015 season. In a Week 4 27–10 loss to the Seattle Seahawks, he passed Tony Gonzalez for second-most career receptions in NFL history. In the 12 games from Weeks 3 to 17, Fitzgerald averaged just 41.9 yards on 4.4 receptions for a total of three touchdowns, as Christian Kirk emerged in his second year. The Cardinals finished with a 5–10–1 record.

=== 2020 ===
Fitzgerald in 2020

On January 15, 2020, Fitzgerald re-signed with the Cardinals on a one-year deal worth $11 million. On November 26, 2020, Fitzgerald was placed on the reserve/COVID-19 list after testing positive for the virus, and was activated on December 8. Overall, Fitzgerald appeared in 13 games in the 2020 season. He finished the season with a career-low 54 receptions for 409 receiving yards and one touchdown, which occurred in Week 15 against the Philadelphia Eagles. In what ended up as his final professional game, he caught six passes for 28 yards against the San Francisco 49ers on December 26 in a 20–12 loss. He was inactive for the final game of the 2020 season as the Cardinals finished 8–8.

=== Retirement ===
On February 16, 2022, despite not officially stating that he was retiring, Fitzgerald admitted he was not planning on returning to play in the NFL. Throughout Fitzgerald's NFL career, he caught touchdown passes from 16 different quarterbacks.

It was announced that on September 7, 2022, that he was joining ESPN's Monday Night Countdown.

In August 2026, the Cardinals announced that they would officially retire Fitzgerald's number 11. He is the sixth player in franchise history to have his number retired.

== Career statistics ==
Legend
	NFL record
	Led the league
**Bold**	Career high

=== NFL ===
==== Regular season ====
Year	Team	Games		Receiving						Fumbles	
Year	Team	GP	GS	Tgt	Rec	Yds	Avg	Lng	TD	Fum	Lost
2004	ARI	16	16	115	58	780	13.4	48	8	1	0
2005	ARI	16	16	165	103	1,409	13.7	47	10	0	0
2006	ARI	13	13	111	69	946	13.7	57	6	0	0
2007	ARI	15	15	167	100	1,409	14.1	48T	10	**3**	**3**
2008	ARI	16	16	154	96	**1,431**	14.9	78T	12	1	0
2009	ARI	16	16	153	97	1,092	11.3	34T	**13**	0	0
2010	ARI	16	15	**173**	90	1,137	12.6	41T	6	0	0
2011	ARI	16	16	154	80	1,411	**17.6**	73T	8	0	0
2012	ARI	16	16	156	71	798	11.2	37T	4	0	0
2013	ARI	16	16	135	82	954	11.6	75	10	1	1
2014	ARI	14	13	103	63	784	12.4	**80T**	2	1	1
2015	ARI	16	16	145	**109**	1,215	11.1	44	9	2	2
2016	ARI	16	16	150	107	1,023	9.6	33	6	2	1
2017	ARI	16	16	161	**109**	1,156	10.6	37	6	1	1
2018	ARI	16	16	112	69	734	10.6	37	6	0	0
2019	ARI	16	16	109	75	804	10.7	54	4	1	1
2020	ARI	13	13	72	54	409	7.6	18	1	0	0
Career		263	261	2,335	1,432	17,492	12.2	80T	121	13	10

==== Postseason ====
Year	Team	Games		Receiving						Fumbles	
Year	Team	GP	GS	Tgt	Rec	Yds	Avg	Lng	TD	Fum	Lost
2008	ARI	4	4	**42**	**30**	**546**	**18.2**	64T	**7**	0	0
2009	ARI	2	2	16	12	159	13.3	33T	2	**1**	**1**
2014	ARI	1	1	8	3	31	10.3	14	0	0	0
2015	ARI	2	2	19	12	206	17.2	**75**	1	0	0
Career		9	9	85	57	942	16.5	75	10	1	1

=== College ===
Legend
Led the NCAA

Season	Team	GP	Receiving			
Season	Team	GP	Rec	Yds	Avg	TD
2002	Pittsburgh	13	69	1,005	14.6	12
2003	Pittsburgh	13	**92**	**1,672**	**18.2**	**22**
Career		26	161	2,677	16.6	34

== Career highlights ==
=== Awards and honors ===
NFL

- Walter Payton NFL Man of the Year (2016)
- Selected for induction into the Pro Football Hall of Fame (2026)
- First-team All-Pro (2008)
- 2× Second-team All-Pro (2009, 2011)
- 11× Pro Bowl (2005, 2007–2013, 2015–2017)
- Pro Bowl MVP (2008)
- 2× NFL receptions leader (2005, 2016)
- 2× NFL receiving touchdowns leader (2008, 2009)
- NFL 2010s All-Decade Team
- NFL 100th Anniversary All-Time Team
- Art Rooney Award (2014)
- PFWA Good Guy Award (2017)
- 10× NFL Top 100 — 14th (2011), 7th (2012), 22nd (2013), 38th (2014), 68th (2015), 27th (2016), 45th (2017), 27th (2018), 60th (2019), 69th (2020)

College

- Biletnikoff Award (2003)
- Walter Camp Award (2003)
- Big East Offensive Player of the Year (2003)
- Unanimous All-American (2003)
- NCAA receiving yards leader (2003)
- NCAA receiving touchdowns leader (2003)
- First-team All-Big East (2003)
- Insight Bowl champion (2002)
- AP All-Time All-America college football team
- Pittsburgh Panthers No. 1 retired

=== Records ===
==== NFL records ====
- Seasons with 90+ receptions: 8
- Most touchdown receptions in a postseason: 7 (2008)
- Most receptions in a postseason: 30 (2008)
- Most postseason games with 150+ receiving yards: 3
- Fewest games needed to score 10 postseason receiving touchdowns (8 games over 7 years)
- Youngest player to record 1,000 receptions (32 years, 97 days)
- First wide receiver in NFL history to record at least 150 career receptions against three different franchises (Seahawks, Rams, and 49ers)

==== Cardinals franchise records ====
- Most receptions (career): 1,378
- Most receptions (season): 109 (2015 and 2017)
- Most receptions (playoff career): 57
- Most receptions (playoff season): 30 (2008)
- Most receptions (playoff game): 9 (January 18, 2009, NFC Championship against the Philadelphia Eagles; tied with Roy Green and David Johnson)
- Most receiving yards (career): 17,492
- Most receiving yards (playoff career): 942
- Most receiving yards (playoff season): 546 (2008)
- Most receiving yards (playoff game): 176 (January 16, 2016, Divisional Round against the Green Bay Packers)
- Most yards per reception (playoff career): 16.5
- Most yards per reception (playoff season): 18.2 (2008)
- Most yards per reception (playoff game) (minimum five receptions): 22 (January 16, 2016, Divisional Round against the Green Bay Packers)
- Most receiving touchdowns (career): 120
- Most receiving touchdowns (playoff career): 10
- Most receiving touchdowns (playoff season): 7 (2008)
- Most receiving touchdowns (playoff game): 3 (January 18, 2009, against the Philadelphia Eagles)
- Most receiving touchdowns (rookie season): 8 (2004; tied with Anquan Boldin and Marvin Harrison Jr.)
- Most receiving yards per game (playoff career): 104.7
- Most receiving yards per game (playoff season): 136.5 (2008)
- Most total touchdowns (career): 121
- Most total touchdowns (playoff career): 10
- Most total touchdowns (playoff season): 7 (2008)
- Most total touchdowns (playoff game): 3 (tied with Mario Bates) (January 18, 2009, NFC Championship against the Philadelphia Eagles)
- Most yards from scrimmage (career): 17,560
- Most yards from scrimmage (playoff career): 942
- Most yards from scrimmage (playoff season): 546 (2008)
- Most yards from scrimmage (playoff game): 176 (January 16, 2016, Divisional Round against the Green Bay Packers)
- Most all-purpose yards (career): 17,560
- Most all-purpose yards (playoff career): 942
- Most all-purpose yards (playoff season): 546 (2008)
- Most 100+-yard receiving games (career): 49
- Most 100+-yard receiving games (playoffs): 5
- Most 100+-yard receiving games (season): 11 (2008)
- Most games with 1+ touchdown scored (career): 106
- Most games with 1+ touchdown scored (season): 13 (2008)
- Most games with 1+ touchdown scored (playoffs): 6
- Most games with 2+ touchdowns scored (career): 22
- Most games with 2+ touchdowns scored (playoffs): 3
- Most games with 3+ touchdowns scored (playoffs): 1 (tied with Mario Bates)
- Most seasons with 1,000+ receiving yards (career): 9
- Most seasons with 1,000+ combined yards: 9
- Most seasons with 10+ receiving touchdowns: 5
- Most consecutive seasons scoring a touchdown: 17 (2004–2020)
- Consecutive games with a catch: 256

== Personal life ==
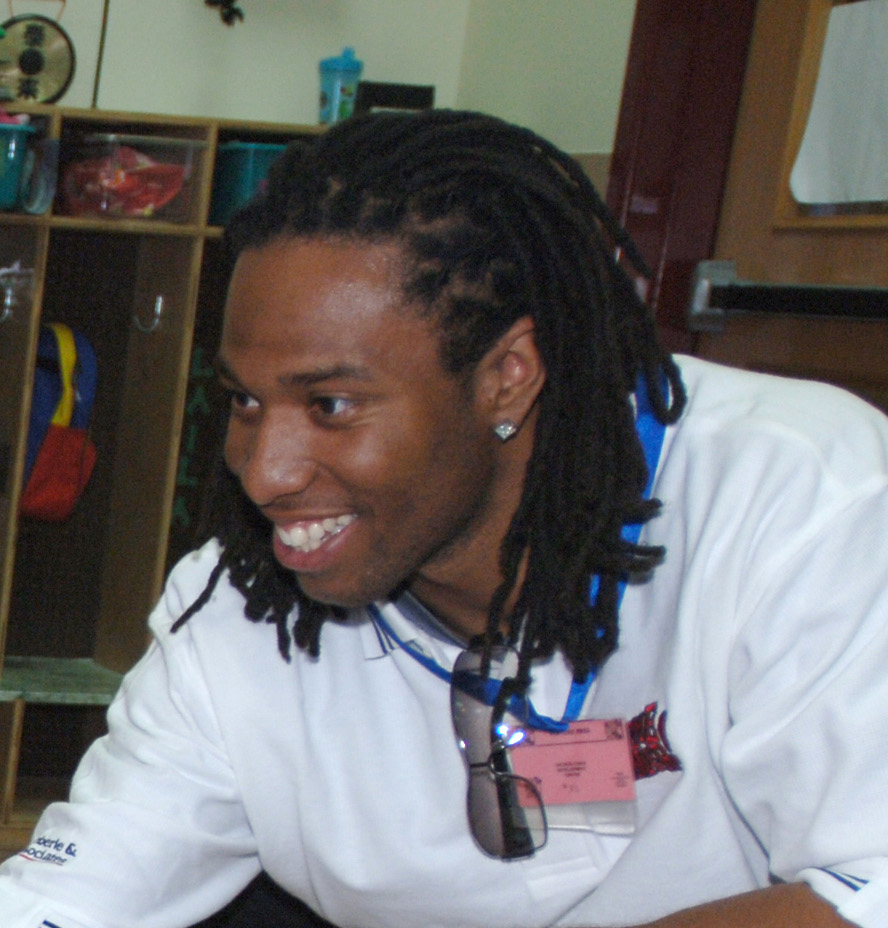
Fitzgerald at the Child Development Center on Incirlik Air Base, Turkey, in 2006

Fitzgerald's father, Larry Fitzgerald Sr., was a sportswriter for the Minnesota Spokesman-Recorder. When he covered Super Bowl XLIII, he was believed to be the first reporter to cover his own son in a Super Bowl. Fitzgerald's mother, Carol, died of a brain hemorrhage while being treated for breast cancer in 2003. Fitzgerald's father died in 2026 from multiple health issues.

In 2016, Fitzgerald completed his undergraduate degree with the University of Phoenix, fulfilling a promise that he made to his mother to finish his education. Since graduation he has become a paid spokesperson for the University of Phoenix. Fitzgerald is an avid traveler and has visited nearly 100 countries.

Fitzgerald has three sons, including Devin, also a wide receiver and an NCAA Division 1 prospect. In December 2025, Devin signed his National Letter of Intent to Notre Dame. Devin presented Larry for his induction into the Pro Football Hall of Fame.

Fitzgerald developed a friendship with Arizona politician John McCain, and spoke at the memorial service for the U.S. senator and Presidential candidate held in Phoenix on August 30, 2018.

On January 22, 2020, Fitzgerald bought a minority stake in the NBA's Phoenix Suns to become a partial team owner. Prior to his retirement, Fitzgerald was the second active NFL player behind Aaron Rodgers to hold an ownership stake with a franchise in the NBA. He has developed a long-standing friendship with franchise owner Robert Sarver since 2005, with him getting more active and involved with the Suns since 2018. His role with the franchise involves him being an advisor and resource for the Suns' business and basketball staff, as well as be a player advisor for both the Suns and Phoenix Mercury, their WNBA franchise. Fitzgerald continues to remain a part of the team's ownership following Sarver's year-long suspension from the NBA and later buyout of the team to new owners Mat Ishbia and Justin Ishbia, being one of three minority owners to keep all of their stakes with the team once the sale went through on February 7, 2023. Later in 2023, Fitzgerald and Suns player Devin Booker would become part-owners of a new pickleball team, formed as part of a 12-team expansion to Major League Pickleball.

Fitzgerald is an active venture investor, having invested in 40 to 50 companies as of October 2019. Fitzgerald turned his passion to see the world into a travel business that he operates, hosting trips in a number of areas around the world.

Fitzgerald is an avid chess player and is the board member of First Move Chess. He played Chess.com's BlitzChamps tournament, a rapid tournament for NFL players where he lost in the semifinals to the eventual champion Chidobe Awuzie.

== Golfing activity ==
Beyond his football career, Fitzgerald is an avid golfer and has competed in numerous high-profile tournaments. He has played alongside professional golfers and celebrities in various pro-am events.

Fitzgerald has been a frequent participant in the AT&T Pebble Beach Pro-Am, one of the most prestigious pro-am golf tournaments. In 2018, he made history by becoming the first African American amateur to win the event, partnering with PGA Tour professional Kevin Streelman. The duo won the event again in 2020.

Fitzgerald has competed in the American Century Championship, a celebrity golf tournament featuring athletes and entertainers. He has also played at Augusta National Golf Club and has been actively involved in events promoting the sport.

In 2024, Fitzgerald was named an honorary co-chair of the U.S. Amateur Championship, recognizing his contributions to golf. He also participated in the Golf4All Day event before the 2023 3M Open, which promotes inclusivity in the sport. In 2025, he is set to compete in the WM Phoenix Open Annexus Pro-Am at TPC Scottsdale.

== In the media ==
=== Video games ===
Fitzgerald was featured on the cover of the EA Sports video game NCAA Football 2005. He was one of two players, along with Troy Polamalu, featured on the cover of Madden NFL 10, making them the first two players to be featured on a Madden NFL cover together.

=== ESPN Analyst ===
Fitzgerald began as an analyst for ESPN in September 2022, where he provides commentary and analysis throughout the NFL season. His coverage includes Monday Night Countdown, NFL playoff coverage, and other broadcasts that expand on football insights.

=== SiriusXM Podcast Host ===
In September 2021, Fitzgerald partnered with Jim Gray and Tom Brady to host the ‘Let’s Go!’ podcast. The weekly program covers news and moments from around the NFL.

== Philanthropy ==
Fitzgerald established the “Larry Fitzgerald First Down Fund” to help kids and their families by funding positive activities for kids during the summer and throughout the year, supporting kids and families in crisis and supporting health-related organizations that work with families. One initiative the “First Down Fund” holds each summer are youth football camps in Arizona and Minnesota. In May 2014, Fitzgerald and Lenovo provided five schools in Minneapolis and four schools in Phoenix Lenovo tablets and equipment to enable the children to gain access to technology. The First Down Fund made a donation to the Minneapolis Park and Recreation to help refurbish a basketball court at Rev Dr. Martin Luther King Jr Park. The court received new hoops, poles, backboards and benches. He partnered with Riddell to provide new helmets to 1,000 kids in the Minneapolis Parks and Recreation football program.

Fitzgerald established the “Carol Fitzgerald Memorial Fund” in honor of his mother, who died of breast cancer in 2003. The organization offers support to causes that Fitzgerald's mother held dear, including educating urban youth about HIV/AIDS and breast cancer issues. He has served as an NFL spokesman for the league-wide breast cancer awareness initiative “A Crucial Catch” for three years and every October makes donations to breast cancer organizations based on his touchdowns and receptions during the month.

In August 2012, he was honored with the 14th annual Pro Football Weekly Arthur S. Arkush Humanitarian Award for his community and charitable contributions. Fitzgerald has made five USO tours to visit soldiers overseas and has raised financial support for injured and critically ill members of the U.S. military.

During the 2013 season, Fitzgerald was honored with the NFL Players Association Georgetown Lombardi Award. The award was established to honor a leader in the sports industry whose life and family have been touched by cancer, and who encourages cancer research, prevention and treatment through awareness and philanthropy.

In 2014, Fitzgerald was selected as the 2014 Henry P. Iba Citizen Athlete Male Recipient, which was created in 1994 by the Rotary Club of Tulsa to recognize an influential male and female premiere athlete for their success in their sport and for being a positive role model who gives back to their communities.

In 2017, Fitzgerald received the Heritage Award from the Arizona Chamber of Commerce and Industry due to his ongoing commitment to improving the lives of Arizonans.

In 2023, Fitzgerald was nominated as a Henry Crown Fellow.

In 2025, Fitzgerald won the Heisman Humanitarian Award.

== See also ==
- List of National Football League career receiving yards leaders
- List of National Football League career receiving touchdowns leaders
- List of National Football League career receptions leaders
- List of National Football League career all-purpose yards leaders
- List of National Football League annual receiving touchdowns leaders
- List of National Football League annual receptions leaders
- List of Arizona Cardinals first-round draft picks
- List of unanimous All-Americans in college football
- List of NCAA major college football yearly receiving leaders
