= 2022–23 NBA season =

77th NBA season

- League: National Basketball Association
- Sport: Basketball
- Duration: October 18, 2022 – April 9, 2023; April 11–14, 2023 (Play-in tournament); April 15, 2023 – May 29, 2023 (Playoffs); June 1–12, 2023 (Finals)
- Games: 82
- Teams: 30
- TV partner(s): ESPN/ABC, TNT/NBA TV
- Streaming partner: ESPN+

Draft
- Top draft pick: Paolo Banchero
- Picked by: Orlando Magic

Regular season
- Top seed: Milwaukee Bucks
- Season MVP: Joel Embiid (Philadelphia)
- Top scorer: Joel Embiid (Philadelphia)

Playoffs
- Eastern champions: Miami Heat
- Eastern runners-up: Boston Celtics
- Western champions: Denver Nuggets
- Western runners-up: Los Angeles Lakers

Finals
- Champions: Denver Nuggets
- Runners-up: Miami Heat
- Finals MVP: Nikola Jokić (Denver)

NBA seasons
- ← 2021–22 2023–24 →

The 2022–23 NBA season was the 77th season of the National Basketball Association (NBA). The regular season began on October 18, 2022, and ended on April 9, 2023. The 2023 NBA All-Star Game was played on February 19, 2023, at Vivint Arena in Salt Lake City. The play-in tournament was held on April 11–14, 2023. The 2023 NBA playoffs then began on April 15, and ended on June 12 with the Denver Nuggets defeating the Miami Heat in 5 games in the 2023 NBA Finals.

== Transactions ==
=== Retirement ===
- On July 21, 2022, J. J. Barea announced his retirement from professional basketball. He won an NBA championship with the Dallas Mavericks in 2011 and multiple gold medals with the Puerto Rican national team.
- On August 20, 2022, Gustavo Ayón announced his retirement from professional basketball. He played three seasons in the NBA and won multiple titles in the EuroLeague and Spanish League in his 16-year career.
- On September 3, 2022, Jodie Meeks announced his retirement from professional basketball. He played for seven teams in his 10-year NBA career and won an NBA championship with the Toronto Raptors in 2019.
- On September 6, 2022, Toure' Murry announced his retirement from professional basketball. He played for three teams during his two-year NBA career, as well as numerous teams overseas.
- On October 26, 2022, Gal Mekel announced his retirement from professional basketball. He played for two teams during his two-year NBA career.
- On November 29, 2022, Chandler Hutchison announced his retirement from professional basketball. He played for three teams during his four-year NBA career.
- On December 15, 2022, Tyrell Terry announced his retirement from professional basketball. He played for two teams during his two-year NBA career.
- On December 24, 2022, Jon Teske announced his retirement from professional basketball. Teske played three games for the Memphis Grizzlies in 2022.
- On March 31, 2023, LaMarcus Aldridge announced his retirement from professional basketball. He played for three teams during his 16-year NBA career, earned seven NBA All-Star honors, as well as five All-NBA selections.
- On May 4, 2023, Keith Langford announced his retirement from professional basketball. Langford played two games for the San Antonio Spurs in 2007.
- On May 22, 2023, Carmelo Anthony announced his retirement from the NBA. He played for six teams in 19 NBA seasons, earned 10 NBA All-Star honors, as well as six All-NBA selections, led the league in scoring during the 2012–13 season, and was selected to the NBA 75th Anniversary Team.
- On June 2, 2023, Shayne Whittington announced his retirement from professional basketball to become an assistant coach for the Indiana Pacers. He played two seasons for the Pacers as well as several teams overseas.
- On June 9, 2023, Eugene Jeter announced his retirement from professional basketball to become a player development coach for the Portland Trail Blazers as well as assistant GM for the Rip City Remix. Jeter played one season for the Sacramento Kings, as well as numerous teams overseas.

=== Draft ===
The 2022 NBA draft took place on June 23, 2022, at Barclays Center in Brooklyn, New York. Paolo Banchero was selected with the first overall pick by the Orlando Magic.

=== Free agency ===
With the previous season's NBA Finals ending in June for the first time since 2019 before the COVID-19 pandemic began, the period for free agency returned to its normal July 1 starting date, along with the July moratorium period before players could begin signing new contracts.

In July 2022, the Philadelphia 76ers were charged with violating the league's moratorium in free agency discussions with P. J. Tucker and Danuel House Jr. and subsequently had two-second round picks rescinded by the league.

== Preseason ==
The NBA often hosts preseason games in non-NBA markets, with the following being played domestically:

Date	Teams	Arena	Location	Reference
October 3	Los Angeles Clippers vs. Portland Trail Blazers	Climate Pledge Arena	Seattle, Washington	
October 5	Oklahoma City Thunder vs. Dallas Mavericks	BOK Center	Tulsa, Oklahoma	
October 5	Los Angeles Lakers vs. Phoenix Suns	T-Mobile Arena	Paradise, Nevada	
October 6	Los Angeles Lakers vs. Minnesota Timberwolves	T-Mobile Arena	Paradise, Nevada	
October 7	Charlotte Hornets vs. Boston Celtics	Greensboro Coliseum	Greensboro, North Carolina	
October 14	New Orleans Pelicans vs. Atlanta Hawks	Legacy Arena	Birmingham, Alabama	

=== International games ===
Preseason contests in the NBA Global Games returned for the first time since the 2019 preseason, prior to the COVID-19 pandemic.

Date	Teams	Arena	Location	Reference
September 30	Golden State Warriors vs. Washington Wizards	Saitama Super Arena	Tokyo, Japan	
October 2	Golden State Warriors vs. Washington Wizards	Saitama Super Arena	Tokyo, Japan	
October 2	Toronto Raptors vs. Utah Jazz	Rogers Place	Edmonton, Alberta, Canada	
October 6	Atlanta Hawks vs. Milwaukee Bucks	Etihad Arena	Abu Dhabi, United Arab Emirates	
October 8	Atlanta Hawks vs. Milwaukee Bucks	Etihad Arena	Abu Dhabi, United Arab Emirates	
October 14	Toronto Raptors vs. Boston Celtics	Bell Centre	Montreal, Quebec, Canada	

== Regular season ==
The regular season schedule was released on August 17, 2022.

Eastern Conference

Atlantic Division	W	L	PCT	GB	Home	Road	Div	GP
y – Boston Celtics	57	25	.695	–	32‍–‍9	25‍–‍16	11–5	82
x – Philadelphia 76ers	54	28	.659	3.0	29‍–‍12	25‍–‍16	10–6	82
x – New York Knicks	47	35	.573	10.0	23‍–‍18	24‍–‍17	8–8	82
x – Brooklyn Nets	45	37	.549	12.0	23‍–‍18	22‍–‍19	7–9	82
pi – Toronto Raptors	41	41	.500	16.0	27‍–‍14	14‍–‍27	4–12	82

Central Division	W	L	PCT	GB	Home	Road	Div	GP
z – Milwaukee Bucks	58	24	.707	–	32‍–‍9	26‍–‍15	11–5	82
x – Cleveland Cavaliers	51	31	.622	7.0	31‍–‍10	20‍–‍21	13–3	82
pi – Chicago Bulls	40	42	.488	18.0	22‍–‍19	18‍–‍23	7–9	82
Indiana Pacers	35	47	.427	23.0	20‍–‍21	15‍–‍26	7–9	82
Detroit Pistons	17	65	.207	41.0	9‍–‍32	8‍–‍33	2–14	82

Southeast Division	W	L	PCT	GB	Home	Road	Div	GP
y – Miami Heat	44	38	.537	–	27‍–‍14	17‍–‍24	10–6	82
x – Atlanta Hawks	41	41	.500	3.0	24‍–‍17	17‍–‍24	8–8	82
Washington Wizards	35	47	.427	9.0	19‍–‍22	16‍–‍25	8–8	82
Orlando Magic	34	48	.415	10.0	20‍–‍21	14‍–‍27	7–9	82
Charlotte Hornets	27	55	.329	17.0	13‍–‍28	14‍–‍27	7–9	82

Western Conference

Northwest Division	W	L	PCT	GB	Home	Road	Div	GP
c – Denver Nuggets	53	29	.646	–	34‍–‍7	19‍–‍22	10–6	82
x – Minnesota Timberwolves	42	40	.512	11.0	22‍–‍19	20‍–‍21	8–8	82
pi – Oklahoma City Thunder	40	42	.488	13.0	24‍–‍17	16‍–‍25	9–7	82
Utah Jazz	37	45	.451	16.0	23‍–‍18	14‍–‍27	6–10	82
Portland Trail Blazers	33	49	.402	20.0	17‍–‍24	16‍–‍25	7–9	82

Pacific Division	W	L	PCT	GB	Home	Road	Div	GP
y – Sacramento Kings	48	34	.585	–	23‍–‍18	25‍–‍16	9–7	82
x – Phoenix Suns	45	37	.549	3.0	28‍–‍13	17‍–‍24	9–7	82
x – Los Angeles Clippers	44	38	.537	4.0	23‍–‍18	21‍–‍20	9–7	82
x – Golden State Warriors	44	38	.537	4.0	33‍–‍8	11‍–‍30	7–9	82
x – Los Angeles Lakers	43	39	.524	5.0	23‍–‍18	20‍–‍21	6–10	82

Southwest Division	W	L	PCT	GB	Home	Road	Div	GP
y – Memphis Grizzlies	51	31	.622	–	35‍–‍6	16‍–‍25	13–3	82
pi – New Orleans Pelicans	42	40	.512	9.0	27‍–‍14	15‍–‍26	11–5	82
Dallas Mavericks	38	44	.463	13.0	23‍–‍18	15‍–‍26	9–7	82
Houston Rockets	22	60	.268	29.0	14‍–‍27	8‍–‍33	4–12	82
San Antonio Spurs	22	60	.268	29.0	14‍–‍27	8‍–‍33	3–13	82

=== By conference ===
Eastern Conference
#	Team	W	L	PCT	GB	GP
1	z – Milwaukee Bucks *	58	24	.707	–	82
2	y – Boston Celtics *	57	25	.695	1.0	82
3	x – Philadelphia 76ers	54	28	.659	4.0	82
4	x – Cleveland Cavaliers	51	31	.622	7.0	82
5	x – New York Knicks	47	35	.573	11.0	82
6	x – Brooklyn Nets	45	37	.549	13.0	82
7	y – Miami Heat *	44	38	.537	14.0	82
8	x – Atlanta Hawks	41	41	.500	17.0	82
9	pi – Toronto Raptors	41	41	.500	17.0	82
10	pi – Chicago Bulls	40	42	.488	18.0	82
11	Indiana Pacers	35	47	.427	23.0	82
12	Washington Wizards	35	47	.427	23.0	82
13	Orlando Magic	34	48	.415	24.0	82
14	Charlotte Hornets	27	55	.329	31.0	82
15	Detroit Pistons	17	65	.207	41.0	82

Western Conference
#	Team	W	L	PCT	GB	GP
1	c – Denver Nuggets *	53	29	.646	–	82
2	y – Memphis Grizzlies *	51	31	.622	2.0	82
3	y – Sacramento Kings *	48	34	.585	5.0	82
4	x – Phoenix Suns	45	37	.549	8.0	82
5	x – Los Angeles Clippers	44	38	.537	9.0	82
6	x – Golden State Warriors	44	38	.537	9.0	82
7	x – Los Angeles Lakers	43	39	.524	10.0	82
8	x – Minnesota Timberwolves	42	40	.512	11.0	82
9	pi – New Orleans Pelicans	42	40	.512	11.0	82
10	pi – Oklahoma City Thunder	40	42	.488	13.0	82
11	Dallas Mavericks	38	44	.463	15.0	82
12	Utah Jazz	37	45	.451	16.0	82
13	Portland Trail Blazers	33	49	.402	20.0	82
14	Houston Rockets	22	60	.268	31.0	82
15	San Antonio Spurs	22	60	.268	31.0	82

Notes

- z – Clinched home court advantage for the entire playoffs
- c – Clinched home court advantage for the conference playoffs
- y – Clinched division title
- x – Clinched playoff spot
- pi – Clinched play-in tournament spot
- * – Division leader

=== International games ===
After nearly three years without an international regular season game due to the COVID-19 pandemic, the NBA brought back the NBA Global Games with two regular season matchups:

Date	Teams	Arena	Location	Reference
NBA Mexico City Game 2022
December 17	Miami Heat vs. San Antonio Spurs	Mexico City Arena	Mexico City, Mexico	
NBA Paris Game 2023
January 19	Chicago Bulls vs. Detroit Pistons	Accor Arena	Paris, France	

== Play-in tournament ==
Only the top six seeds in each conference after regular season advanced to the main rounds of the 2023 NBA playoffs, while the teams ranked 7th through 10th in each conference participated in a Page playoff system tournament from April 11–14, 2023, to determine 7th and 8th seeded teams in each conference making playoffs. To this end in each conference: 1) The 7th place team hosted the 8th place team in the double-chance round needing to win one game to advance, with the winner clinching the 7th seed in the playoffs. 2) Each of the 9th place team and the 10th place team required two wins to advance to the playoffs. The 9th place team hosted the 10th place team in the elimination round, with the loser being eliminated from the contention. 3) The loser in the double-chance round hosted the elimination round game-winner, with the winner clinching the 8th seed and the loser being eliminated.

=== Eastern Conference ===
Play-in games
7	Miami	105
8	Atlanta	116
9	Toronto	105
10	Chicago	109

No. 8 seed game
7	Miami	102
10	Chicago	91

Final seeds
8	Atlanta	No. 7 seed
7	Miami	No. 8 seed

Bold Game winner
Italic Team with home-court advantage

=== Western Conference ===
Play-in games
7	LA Lakers	108 (OT)
8	Minnesota	102
9	New Orleans	118
10	Oklahoma City	123

No. 8 seed game
8	Minnesota	120
10	Oklahoma City	95

Final seeds
7	LA Lakers	No. 7 seed
8	Minnesota	No. 8 seed

Bold Game winner
Italic Team with home-court advantage

== Playoffs ==
The playoffs began on April 15, 2023.

=== Bracket ===
First round	Conference semifinals
E1	Milwaukee*	1
E8	Miami*	4
E8	Miami*	4
E5	New York	2
E4	Cleveland	1
E5	New York	4
Eastern Conference
E3	Philadelphia	4
E6	Brooklyn	0
E3	Philadelphia	3
E2	Boston*	4
E2	Boston*	4
E7	Atlanta	2
W1	Denver*	4
W8	Minnesota	1
W1	Denver*	4
W4	Phoenix	2
W4	Phoenix	4
W5	LA Clippers	1
Western Conference
W3	Sacramento*	3
W6	Golden State	4
W6	Golden State	2
W7	LA Lakers	4
W2	Memphis*	2
W7	LA Lakers	4

Conference finals
E8	Miami*	4
E2	Boston*	3
W1	Denver*	4
W7	LA Lakers	0

NBA Finals
E8	Miami*	1
W1	Denver*	4

- * Division winner
- Bold Series winner
- Italic Team with home-court advantage

== Statistics ==
=== Individual statistic leaders ===
Category	Player	Team(s)	Statistic
Points per game	Joel Embiid	Philadelphia 76ers	33.1
Rebounds per game	Domantas Sabonis	Sacramento Kings	12.3
Assists per game	James Harden	Philadelphia 76ers	10.7
Steals per game	O.G. Anunoby	Toronto Raptors	1.9
Blocks per game	Jaren Jackson Jr.	Memphis Grizzlies	3.0
Turnovers per game	Trae Young	Atlanta Hawks	4.1
Fouls per game	Jaren Jackson Jr.	Memphis Grizzlies	3.6
Minutes per game	Pascal Siakam	Toronto Raptors	37.3
FG%	Nic Claxton	Brooklyn Nets	70.5%
FT%	Tyler Herro	Miami Heat	93.4%
3P%	Luke Kennard	L.A. Clippers/Memphis	49.4%
Efficiency per game	Nikola Jokić	Denver Nuggets	38.0
Double-doubles	Domantas Sabonis	Sacramento Kings	65
Triple-doubles	Nikola Jokić	Denver Nuggets	29

=== Individual game highs ===
Category	Player	Team	Statistic
Points	Damian Lillard	Portland Trail Blazers	71
Points	Donovan Mitchell	Cleveland Cavaliers	71
Rebounds	Ivica Zubac	Los Angeles Clippers	29
Assists	James Harden	Philadelphia 76ers	21
Steals	De'Anthony Melton	Philadelphia 76ers	7
Steals	D'Angelo Russell	Minnesota Timberwolves	7
Blocks	Brook Lopez	Milwaukee Bucks	9
Three pointers	Damian Lillard	Portland Trail Blazers	13

=== Team statistic leaders ===
Category	Team	Statistic
Points per game	Sacramento Kings	120.7
Rebounds per game	Milwaukee Bucks	48.6
Assists per game	Golden State Warriors	29.8
Steals per game	Toronto Raptors	9.4
Blocks per game	Brooklyn Nets	6.2
Turnovers per game	Golden State Warriors	15.7
Fouls per game	Detroit Pistons	22.1
FG%	Denver Nuggets	50.4%
FT%	Philadelphia 76ers	83.6%
3P%	Philadelphia 76ers	38.7%
+/−	Boston Celtics	+6.5

== Awards ==
Beginning with this season, the team who finished with the best overall regular season record would receive the Maurice Podoloff Trophy, named in honor of Maurice Podoloff, who served as the commissioner of the NBA from 1946 to 1963. The Podoloff Trophy was originally given to the NBA's Most Valuable Player of the regular season until 2021. The MVP trophy was then renamed in honor of Michael Jordan, a five-time winner and often considered the greatest player in league history. A new award, the Clutch Player of the Year Award, was also introduced to honor players who best come through for their teammates in the clutch. This trophy was named after Jerry West.

The league also announced updated trophy designs for the Coach of the Year Award, Defensive Player of the Year Award, Executive of the Year Award, Most Improved Player Award, Rookie of the Year Award, Sixth Man of the Year Award, Sportsmanship Award, and the Teammate of the Year Award. The Defensive Player of the Year, Most Improved Player, Rookie of the Year and Sixth Man of the Year trophies were then renamed in honor of Hakeem Olajuwon, George Mikan, Wilt Chamberlain, and John Havlicek respectively.

=== Yearly awards ===
2022–23 NBA awards
Award	Recipient(s)	Finalists
Most Valuable Player	Joel Embiid (Philadelphia 76ers)	Giannis Antetokounmpo (Milwaukee Bucks); Nikola Jokić (Denver Nuggets)
Defensive Player of the Year	Jaren Jackson Jr. (Memphis Grizzlies)	Brook Lopez (Milwaukee Bucks); Evan Mobley (Cleveland Cavaliers)
Rookie of the Year	Paolo Banchero (Orlando Magic)	Walker Kessler (Utah Jazz); Jalen Williams (Oklahoma City Thunder)
Sixth Man of the Year	Malcolm Brogdon (Boston Celtics)	Bobby Portis (Milwaukee Bucks); Immanuel Quickley (New York Knicks)
Most Improved Player	Lauri Markkanen (Utah Jazz)	Jalen Brunson (New York Knicks); Shai Gilgeous-Alexander (Oklahoma City Thunder)
Clutch Player of the Year	De'Aaron Fox (Sacramento Kings)	Jimmy Butler (Miami Heat); DeMar DeRozan (Chicago Bulls)
Coach of the Year	Mike Brown (Sacramento Kings)	Mark Daigneault (Oklahoma City Thunder); Joe Mazzulla (Boston Celtics)
Executive of the Year	Monte McNair (Sacramento Kings)	Koby Altman (Cleveland Cavaliers); Calvin Booth (Denver Nuggets); Justin Zanik (Utah Jazz)
NBA Sportsmanship Award	Mike Conley Jr. (Minnesota Timberwolves)	Boban Marjanović (Houston Rockets); Darius Garland (Cleveland Cavaliers); Bam Adebayo (Miami Heat); Harrison Barnes (Sacramento Kings); Jalen Brunson (New York Knicks)
Twyman–Stokes Teammate of the Year Award	Jrue Holiday (Milwaukee Bucks)	
Community Assist Award	Brook Lopez (Milwaukee Bucks)	
Kareem Abdul-Jabbar Social Justice Champion Award	Stephen Curry (Golden State Warriors)	Chris Paul (Phoenix Suns); Jaren Jackson Jr. (Memphis Grizzlies); Tre Jones (San Antonio Spurs); Grant Williams (Boston Celtics)
NBA Hustle Award	Marcus Smart (Boston Celtics)	
NBA Conference Finals Most Valuable Player Award (Western)	Nikola Jokić (Denver Nuggets)	
NBA Conference Finals Most Valuable Player Award (Eastern)	Jimmy Butler (Miami Heat)	

- All-NBA First Team:
  - F Giannis Antetokounmpo, Milwaukee Bucks
  - F Jayson Tatum, Boston Celtics
  - C Joel Embiid, Philadelphia 76ers
  - G Luka Dončić, Dallas Mavericks
  - G Shai Gilgeous-Alexander, Oklahoma City Thunder
- All-NBA Second Team:
  - F Jimmy Butler, Miami Heat
  - F Jaylen Brown, Boston Celtics
  - C Nikola Jokić, Denver Nuggets
  - G Donovan Mitchell, Cleveland Cavaliers
  - G Stephen Curry, Golden State Warriors
- All-NBA Third Team:
  - F Julius Randle, New York Knicks
  - F LeBron James, Los Angeles Lakers
  - C Domantas Sabonis, Sacramento Kings
  - G De'Aaron Fox, Sacramento Kings
  - G Damian Lillard, Portland Trail Blazers

- NBA All-Defensive First Team:
  - F Jaren Jackson Jr., Memphis Grizzlies
  - F Evan Mobley, Cleveland Cavaliers
  - C Brook Lopez, Milwaukee Bucks
  - G Jrue Holiday, Milwaukee Bucks
  - G Alex Caruso, Chicago Bulls
- NBA All-Defensive Second Team:
  - F O.G. Anunoby, Toronto Raptors
  - F Draymond Green, Golden State Warriors
  - C Bam Adebayo, Miami Heat
  - G Derrick White, Boston Celtics
  - G Dillon Brooks, Memphis Grizzlies

- NBA All-Rookie First Team:
  - Paolo Banchero, Orlando Magic
  - Walker Kessler, Utah Jazz
  - Bennedict Mathurin, Indiana Pacers
  - Keegan Murray, Sacramento Kings
  - Jalen Williams, Oklahoma City Thunder
- NBA All-Rookie Second Team:
  - Jalen Duren, Detroit Pistons
  - Tari Eason, Houston Rockets
  - Jaden Ivey, Detroit Pistons
  - Jabari Smith Jr., Houston Rockets
  - Jeremy Sochan, San Antonio Spurs

=== Players of the Week ===
The following players were named the Eastern and Western Conference Players of the Week.

Week	Eastern Conference	Western Conference	Ref
October 18–23	Jayson Tatum (Boston Celtics) (1/1)	Damian Lillard (Portland Trail Blazers) (1/3)	
October 24–30	Giannis Antetokounmpo (Milwaukee Bucks) (1/4)	Shai Gilgeous-Alexander (Oklahoma City Thunder) (1/2)	
October 31 – November 6	Kevin Durant (Brooklyn Nets) (1/2)	Paul George (Los Angeles Clippers) (1/1)	
November 7–13	Joel Embiid (Philadelphia 76ers) (1/4)	Stephen Curry (Golden State Warriors) (1/1)	
November 14–20	Tyrese Haliburton (Indiana Pacers) (1/1)	De'Aaron Fox (Sacramento Kings) (1/1)	
November 21–27	Giannis Antetokounmpo (Milwaukee Bucks) (2/4)	Deandre Ayton (Phoenix Suns) (1/1)	
November 28 – December 4	Kevin Durant (Brooklyn Nets) (2/2)	Anthony Davis (Los Angeles Lakers) (1/2)	
December 5–11	Joel Embiid (Philadelphia 76ers) (2/4)	Zion Williamson (New Orleans Pelicans) (1/1)	
December 12–18	Donovan Mitchell (Cleveland Cavaliers) (1/2)	Nikola Jokić (Denver Nuggets) (1/1)	
December 19–25	Pascal Siakam (Toronto Raptors) (1/1)	Luka Dončić (Dallas Mavericks) (1/2)	
December 26 – January 1	Kristaps Porziņģis (Washington Wizards) (1/1)	Luka Dončić (Dallas Mavericks) (2/2)	
January 2–8	Donovan Mitchell (Cleveland Cavaliers) (2/2)	LeBron James (Los Angeles Lakers) (1/2)	
January 9–15	Jalen Brunson (New York Knicks) (1/1)	Domantas Sabonis (Sacramento Kings) (1/3)	
January 16–22	Jrue Holiday (Milwaukee Bucks) (1/1)	LeBron James (Los Angeles Lakers) (2/2)	
January 23–29	Giannis Antetokounmpo (Milwaukee Bucks) (3/4)	Damian Lillard (Portland Trail Blazers) (2/3)	
January 30 – February 5	Giannis Antetokounmpo (Milwaukee Bucks) (4/4)	Damian Lillard (Portland Trail Blazers) (3/3)	
February 6–12	Derrick White (Boston Celtics) (1/1)	Shai Gilgeous-Alexander (Oklahoma City Thunder) (2/2)	
February 27 – March 5	Julius Randle (New York Knicks) (1/1)	Devin Booker (Phoenix Suns) (1/1)	
March 6–12	Joel Embiid (Philadelphia 76ers) (3/4)	Domantas Sabonis (Sacramento Kings) (2/3)	
March 13–19	Joel Embiid (Philadelphia 76ers) (4/4)	Domantas Sabonis (Sacramento Kings) (3/3)	
March 20–26	Jaylen Brown (Boston Celtics) (1/1)	Brandon Ingram (New Orleans Pelicans) (1/1)	
March 27 – April 2	Mikal Bridges (Brooklyn Nets) (1/1)	Anthony Davis (Los Angeles Lakers) (2/2)	
April 3–9	Bobby Portis (Milwaukee Bucks) (1/1)	Kawhi Leonard (Los Angeles Clippers) (1/1)	

=== Players of the Month ===
The following players were named the Eastern and Western Conference Players of the Month.

Month	Eastern Conference	Western Conference	Ref
October/November	Jayson Tatum (Boston Celtics) (1/1)	Devin Booker (Phoenix Suns) (1/1)	
December	Joel Embiid (Philadelphia 76ers) (1/3)	Luka Dončić (Dallas Mavericks) (1/1)	
January	Joel Embiid (Philadelphia 76ers) (2/3)	Nikola Jokić (Denver Nuggets) (1/2)	
February	Jalen Brunson (New York Knicks) (1/1)	Nikola Jokić (Denver Nuggets) (2/2)	
March/April	Joel Embiid (Philadelphia 76ers) (3/3)	Anthony Davis (Los Angeles Lakers) (1/1)	

=== Rookies of the Month ===
The following players were named the Eastern and Western Conference Rookies of the Month.

Month	Eastern Conference	Western Conference	Ref
October/November	Bennedict Mathurin (Indiana Pacers) (1/1)	Jalen Williams (Oklahoma City Thunder) (1/2)	
December	Paolo Banchero (Orlando Magic) (1/4)	Keegan Murray (Sacramento Kings) (1/2)	
January	Paolo Banchero (Orlando Magic) (2/4)	Keegan Murray (Sacramento Kings) (2/2)	
February	Paolo Banchero (Orlando Magic) (3/4)	Walker Kessler (Utah Jazz) (1/1)	
March/April	Paolo Banchero (Orlando Magic) (4/4)	Jalen Williams (Oklahoma City Thunder) (2/2)	

=== Coaches of the Month ===
The following coaches were named the Eastern and Western Conference Coaches of the Month.

Month	Eastern Conference	Western Conference	Ref
October/November	Joe Mazzulla (Boston Celtics) (1/1)	Monty Williams (Phoenix Suns) (1/1)	
December	Jacque Vaughn (Brooklyn Nets) (1/1)	Willie Green (New Orleans Pelicans) (1/1)	
January	Doc Rivers (Philadelphia 76ers) (1/2)	Michael Malone (Denver Nuggets) (1/1)	
February	Mike Budenholzer (Milwaukee Bucks) (1/1)	Mike Brown (Sacramento Kings) (1/1)	
March/April	Doc Rivers (Philadelphia 76ers) (2/2)	Taylor Jenkins (Memphis Grizzlies) (1/1)	

== Arenas ==
- The Miami Heat's home arena, formerly known as FTX Arena, was renamed Kaseya Center on April 4, 2023. It was previously renamed to Miami–Dade Arena on January 12 after the previous naming rights deal with FTX was terminated due to the company's bankruptcy.

== Media ==
=== National ===
This was the seventh year of a nine-year deal with the ESPN family of networks and Turner Sports. ESPN broadcasts Wednesday and Friday night games for most of the season, and games during selected Sunday nights from February to April. ABC aired NBA Saturday Primetime on eight Saturday nights between December and March, with a tripleheader on January 28, the first tripleheader on the network outside of Christmas Day, along with a Saturday afternoon game on January 14. The network also broadcast NBA Sunday Showcase on three selected Sunday afternoons in February and early March. TNT airs Tuesday games all season, and Thursday games from January to April. NBA TV televises games primarily on Mondays all season, Saturday and Sunday nights for most of the season, Thursdays during the first half of the season, Fridays during the second half of the season, and any other time when neither ESPN/ABC nor TNT are airing games nationally.

Five Christmas Day games were scheduled for this season. ABC was originally scheduled to air just a tripleheader, but it was later decided that all five Christmas games would be simulcast across both ABC and ESPN for the first time, likely in an attempt to counterprogram the NFL's scheduling of a Christmas Day tripleheader for the first time. Previously, the most Christmas games that either network had ever aired in any given season was three.

Four Martin Luther King Jr. Day games were nationally televised, with TNT and NBA TV each airing two games.

The NBA designed January 24–28 as "NBA Rivals Week", with every nationally televised game featuring "classic and budding rivalries between teams and players".

On March 8, ESPN had another all-female crew for an NBA game for the second straight year. The 7:30pm (ET) telecast between the Dallas Mavericks and the New Orleans Pelicans had Beth Mowins and Doris Burke as commentators, with Cassidy Hubbarth on the sideline, while the 10:00pm (ET) telecast between the Toronto Raptors and the Los Angeles Clippers had Mike Breen and Mark Jackson as commentators, with reporter Ros Gold-Onwude joining the broadcast team as an analyst/color commentator.

On the final day of the regular season, April 9, two games with playoff implications were flexed into ESPN's afternoon doubleheader.

=== Local ===
In September 2022, Monumental Sports & Entertainment bought out NBCUniversal's ownership stake in NBC Sports Washington, which carries broadcasts of the Washington Wizards and the NHL's Washington Capitals, both Monumental-owned teams. Monumental initially took minority ownership of the network in 2016. NBC provided transitional corporate, technical, and distribution support up to 18 months after the sale, and Monumental plans to rebrand the network after the 2022–23 season.

In October 2022, the Clippers launched a direct-to-consumer streaming service called ClipperVision. The service includes all non-national games. The Clippers also announced an agreement with Nexstar Media Group to air four preseason games and 11 regular season games on KTLA, KSWB-TV, KGET-TV and KSEE-TV. The remaining games continued to air locally on Bally Sports West and Bally Sports SoCal.

On February 24, 2023, the AT&T SportsNet regional sports networks sent letters to the Houston Rockets and the Utah Jazz saying they had until March 31, 2023, to reach an agreement to take their local television rights back. Warner Bros. Discovery, the owners of the networks, intends to leave the regional sports networks business. If a deal is not reached the networks would file for Chapter 7 bankruptcy. The Portland Trail Blazers's deal with Root Sports Northwest is not affected because Warner Bros. Discovery only has minority control of that network.

On March 14, Diamond Sports Group, the operator of the Bally Sports regional sports networks, filed for Chapter 11 bankruptcy. Diamond plans to continue to broadcast games for the 16 NBA teams it has regional rights to while it plans to separate from majority parent Sinclair Broadcast Group as part of the reorganization.

== Notable occurrences ==
- The NBA and NBPA announced a pension plan for former ABA players who played at least three seasons in the league.
- The Board of Governors approved the permanent adoption of the NBA play-in tournament that had been in place for the previous two seasons. Previously, the Board approved the tournament on a season-by-season basis.
- The league instituted a new penalty for the "take foul". The offensive team will be allotted one free throw and retain possession with this penalty in place. The defensive player who commits the foul will be assessed one common personal foul. Previously, the penalty was a common personal foul on the offending player in addition to a side out for the offensive team if they were not in the bonus.
- Following the death of 11-time champion Bill Russell, the NBA permanently retired the number 6 across the league, the first time a player's number has been retired across the league. However, players who had the number 6 beforehand can keep their number unless they voluntarily change it or retire.
- The NBA honored Russell with a jersey patch. Every team wore a commemorative patch on the right sleeve of their jerseys. Every NBA court honored Russell with a clover-shaped logo featuring the No. 6 on the sideline.
- On July 9, 2022, Nikola Jokić signed a five-year, $264 million supermax extension with the Denver Nuggets, the largest in league history at that time.
- On September 13, 2022, the NBA and WNBA suspended Phoenix Suns owner Robert Sarver for one year after an independent investigation determined that he used the n-word multiple times, sexually harassed and assaulted multiple male and female employees, and engaged in demeaning behavior towards employees.
- On September 21, Sarver announced he was exploring selling both the Suns and WNBA's Phoenix Mercury franchises.
- A record 23 Canadians appeared on opening-night rosters, marking the ninth consecutive season of Canada being the second-most represented country in the NBA.
- On October 19, 2022, Walker Kessler of the Utah Jazz became the first player to record a double-double, with 12 points and 10 rebounds while shooting 100% (5/5) in his rookie debut.
- On October 22, 2022, Paolo Banchero of the Orlando Magic became the first teenager to score 20 points or more in his first three games. This streak ended on his 7th game, where he scored 18 points on October 30, 2022.
- On October 25, 2022, the Golden State Warriors and the Phoenix Suns set a record for the most combined technical fouls (7) in a quarter (3rd)
- On October 28, 2022, DeMar DeRozan became the 50th player to score 20,000 points.
- On October 31, 2022, Kevin Durant passed Vince Carter for 19th place on the all-time scoring list.
- On November 3, 2022, Nikola Jokic recorded the most turnovers (7) in a quarter since tracking began 2016-17
- On November 4, 2022, Luka Dončić became the second NBA player to score 30 or more points in the first eight games of a season, joining Wilt Chamberlain.
- On November 4, 2022, the Golden State Warriors became the first defending champion to start the season 0–6 on the road.
- In commemoration of Election Day in the United States, the league did not schedule regular season games on November 8. The league, in turn, scheduled a full slate of games on November 7 with all 30 teams in action, with a unique schedule that saw staggered tip-offs every 15 minutes. The NBA mobile app aired commercial-free whiparound coverage on NBA CrunchTime.
- On November 7, 2022, the Los Angeles Lakers set the record for the worst 3-point field goal percentage in any four-game span (min. 125 attempts) in NBA history
- On November 11, 2022, Stephen Curry became the first player with 40 points, five 3-pointers, 65% field goal percentage in consecutive games
- On November 13, 2022, Joel Embiid became the first player in NBA history to record 50+ points, 10+ rebounds, 5+ assists, and 5+ blocks in a game. He scored a career high 59 points along with 11 rebounds, eight assists, and seven blocks in a 105–98 victory over the Utah Jazz, with 26 points and five blocks coming in the fourth quarter.
- On December 10, 2022, former player and coach Paul Silas, the father of current Houston Rockets head coach Stephen died at the age of 79.
- On December 15, 2022, the Denver Nuggets set the record for the most paint points (98) by a team in a game since tracking began in 1998
- On December 20, 2022, Robert Sarver accepted a deal made by an ownership group led by United Wholesale Mortgage's CEO Mat Ishbia and his older brother Justin Ishbia for a record-high price of $4 billion, breaking a record previously held by Joe Tsai when he purchased the Brooklyn Nets from Mikhail Prokhorov in 2019.
- On December 26, 2022, Duncan Robinson became the fastest player to hit 800 3-pointers. He did so in 263 consecutive games, surpassing the previous record held by Luka Dončić in 288 games, in a win against the Minnesota Timberwolves.
- On December 27, 2022, Luka Dončić became the first player in NBA history to record a 60-point, 20-rebound triple-double (60 points, 21 rebounds, and 10 assists) in a 126–121 comeback overtime victory over the New York Knicks.
- On December 29, 2022, Buddy Hield scored the fastest three point field goal since play-by-play was registered, by doing so in 3 seconds.
- On December 31, 2022, Luka Dončić became the first player in NBA history to record 250 points, 50 rebounds, and 50 assists in a five game span.
- On January 2, 2023, Donovan Mitchell became the seventh player in NBA history to score 70 or more points in a single game. He had 71 points, 11 assists, and eight rebounds in a win over the Chicago Bulls. He also became the first player in NBA history to score at least 70 points and record at least 10 assists.
- On January 10, 2023, the Miami Heat went 40 for 40 from the free throw line in a win against the Oklahoma City Thunder, breaking the record (39 for 39) set by the Utah Jazz in 1982.
- On January 13, 2023, the San Antonio Spurs set a regular season single-game attendance record with 68,323 people at the Alamodome in a 144–113 loss against the Golden State Warriors.
- On January 15, 2023, LeBron James became the second player in NBA history to score 38,000 career points.
- On January 24, 2023, LeBron James became the first player to score 40 points against all 30 NBA teams with a 46-point performance against the Los Angeles Clippers.
- On January 25, 2023, Damian Lillard posted the highest true shooting percentage (89.8%) in a 60-point performance (21/29 total FG and 9/15 from three) in NBA history
- On January 31, 2023, Russell Westbrook surpassed Gary Payton for number 10 on the all-time assists list.
- On January 31, 2023, LeBron James became the first player to have a triple-double in his 20th season, accumulating 28 points, 10 rebounds, and 11 assists in a 129–123 overtime win over the New York Knicks.
- On February 6, 2023, the NBA's Board of Governors held a vote approving the sale of the Phoenix Suns to Mat Ishbia, with a 29–0 unanimous vote approving the sale, with only Dan Gilbert of the Cleveland Cavaliers abstaining from the vote. The move was then made official a day later.
- On February 6, 2023, Klay Thompson tied the NBA record for most 3-point field goals made (12) in a game without a free throw attempt
- On February 7, 2023, LeBron James surpassed Kareem Abdul-Jabbar as the all-time leading scorer in NBA history in a game versus the Oklahoma City Thunder with a fadeaway jumpshot over Kenrich Williams.
- On February 11, 2023, Jayson Tatum (24 years, 344 days) became the youngest to reach 1,000 3-point field goals made in NBA history
- On February 24, 2023, the Sacramento Kings and Los Angeles Clippers competed in the second-highest scoring game in NBA history. The Kings defeated the Clippers 176–175 in double-overtime at the Crypto.com Arena.
- On February 26, 2023, Damian Lillard became the eighth player in NBA history to score 70 or more points in a single game, and the oldest to do so at the age of 32. He had 71 points, six rebounds and six assists, in a win over the Houston Rockets. He made 13 three-pointers, one shy of the NBA record. He is the only player in NBA history to score at least 70 points while making at least 10 three-pointers.
- On March 2, 2023, Damian Lillard broke a 25-year old Michael Jordan record for most 40-point games in a season at age 32 or older
- On March 29, 2023, Keegan Murray of the Sacramento Kings passed Donovan Mitchell (187), to record the most 3-pointers made for a rookie in a single season in NBA history with 188. He made this feat in a winning effort, 120–80 against the Portland Trail Blazers, as well as clinching their playoff berth after 16 seasons. Subsequently, on April 4, 2023, the No. 4 overall pick in the 2022 NBA draft recorded his 200th 3-pointers, in a 121–103 victory against the New Orleans Pelicans.
- On April 3, 2023, Lauri Markkanen became the first player to make 100 dunks and 200 3-pointers in a season
- On April 9, 2023, the Miami Heat set the record for the most bench points (111) by a team in a game
- On April 9, 2023, the Golden State Warriors set the record for the most points scored in the first quarter with 55 in a game against the Portland Trail Blazers.
- For the first time since the 2000–01 NBA season, no team won 60 games in a full 82-game regular season.
- All three Texas teams missed the playoffs in the same season for the first time ever, after the Mavericks were eliminated by losing to the Chicago Bulls on April 7, 2023.
- With the Lakers winning their play-in game against the Minnesota Timberwolves on April 11, 2023, all four California teams qualified for the playoffs in the same season for the first time ever.
- For the sixth time in history, an eight-seeded team defeated a first-seeded team in the first round of the playoffs when the Miami Heat defeated the Milwaukee Bucks in five games. The Heat also became the first play-in team to win a playoff series.
- The Los Angeles Lakers became the second play-in team and first seventh seed in the play-in tournament era to win a playoff series after defeating the Memphis Grizzlies in six games.
- On May 28, 2023, the NBA opened an investigation into referee Eric Lewis for using a burner Twitter account.
- On June 7, 2023, Udonis Haslem, aged 42 years, 363 days became the oldest player to play in the NBA Finals, surpassing the previous record held by Kareem Abdul-Jabbar in 1989.
- LeBron James set multiple NBA records by averaging the most points (28.9 ppg), rebounds (8.3 rpg), assists (6.8 apg), minutes (35.5 mpg) and field goals (1,219 total) in 20th season or later
- The Golden State Warriors set the record for the most 3-point field goals made (1,363) by a team in a season
- All five teams from the Pacific Division qualified for the playoffs, marking the third instance every team in a division qualified for the playoffs since the NBA adopted the current six division format in 2004–05. Previously, all five teams from the Central Division during the 2005–06 season and the Southwest Division during the 2014–15 season qualified for the playoffs.
- On October 23, 2025, the Federal Bureau of Investigation announced arrests for match fixing that involved four 2022–23 season NBA games as part of the 2025 NBA illegal gambling prosecution. The affected games were Milwaukee at Los Angeles Lakers (February 9, 2023), Charlotte at New Orleans (March 23, 2023), Chicago at Portland (March 24, 2023), and Cleveland at Orlando (April 6, 2023).

== Attendance ==
The average attendance was 18,077. The 2023–24 NBA teams by average home attendance:

#	NBA team	Total attendance	Home games	Average attendance
1	Chicago Bulls	841,632	41	20,527
2	Philadelphia 76ers	839,261	41	20,469
3	Dallas Mavericks	827,282	41	20,177
4	Toronto Raptors	811,261	41	19,786
5	Miami Heat	807,190	41	19,687
6	Cleveland Cavaliers	777,280	41	19,432
7	New York Knicks	795,110	41	19,392
8	Denver Nuggets	788,635	41	19,235
9	Boston Celtics	766,240	41	19,156
10	Portland Trail Blazers	767,374	41	18,716
11	Los Angeles Lakers	763,168	41	18,613
12	Detroit Pistons	759,715	41	18,529
13	Utah Jazz	728,240	41	18,206
14	Golden State Warriors	740,624	41	18,064
15	Orlando Magic	728,405	41	17,765
16	Brooklyn Nets	724,439	41	17,669
17	Los Angeles Clippers	720,543	41	17,574
18	Atlanta Hawks	719,787	41	17,555
19	Milwaukee Bucks	718,786	41	17,531
20	Sacramento Kings	715,491	41	17,451
21	Washington Wizards	710,481	41	17,328
22	Memphis Grizzlies	707,836	41	17,264
23	Charlotte Hornets	702,052	41	17,123
24	Phoenix Suns	682,840	41	17,071
25	San Antonio Spurs	694,434	41	16,937
26	New Orleans Pelicans	687,691	41	16,772
27	Minnesota Timberwolves	687,510	41	16,768
28	Houston Rockets	668,865	41	16,313
29	Indiana Pacers	641,562	41	15,647
30	Oklahoma City Thunder	636,903	41	15,534

== See also ==
- List of NBA regular season records
