= Millard Seldin =

American businessman and horsebreeder (1926–2020)

Millard Roy Seldin
- Born: August 8, 1926; Council Bluffs, Iowa, U.S.
- Died: January 24, 2020 (aged 93); Paradise Valley, Arizona, U.S.
- Education: University of Iowa
- Occupation(s): Businessman, horsebreeder
- Known for: Thoroughbred Owners and Breeders Association's Nebraska Horse Breeder of the Year (1988); Co-founder of Southwest Value Partners (1990)
- Spouse: Beverly Seldin
- Children: 2 sons, 1 daughter

Millard Seldin (August 8, 1926 – January 24, 2020) was an American real estate developer, banker, basketball investor, and horsebreeder.

== Life ==
Seldin was born on August 8, 1926, in Council Bluffs, Iowa. His father, Ben I. Seldin, an immigrant from Russia, founded Seldin Insurance Co., acquired motels in Iowa, Nebraska and Kansas, and developed 17 apartment complexes and four shopping centers. Seldin served in the United States Navy during World War II for two years, and he graduated from the University of Iowa in 1951.

Seldin co-founded Seldin and Seldin with his father Ben when he was still in college. He later founded Seldin Development and Management Company, a real estate development and management company in Omaha, Nebraska, where he built many structures including the Royalwood Office Center, Camelot Village and Howard Johnson's Motor Lodge. Seldin also co-founded the Hawkeye Bank in Iowa. In 1990, he co-founded Southwest Value Partners, another real estate development company in Scottsdale, Arizona, with Robert Sarver. Seldin was also a minority owner in Phoenix Mercury and Phoenix Suns, two basketball teams.

As a horsebreeder, Seldin owned Love Lock, Pretty Greeley, Golden Yank, Cherokee Lord, Dr. Hugs, and Greeley's Conquest. He was named the Nebraska Horse Breeder of the Year by the Thoroughbred Owners and Breeders Association in 1988.

With his wife Beverly, Seldin had two sons, Scott and Derry, and a daughter, Traci Moser. He resided in Omaha, Nebraska and Paradise Valley, Arizona, where he died on January 24, 2020, at age 93.
