= Wholesale mortgage lenders =

Type of lending institution

A wholesale mortgage lender is a bank or other lending institution that funds and sometimes services mortgage loans, but uses independent mortgage brokers for the initial interaction with the client, including the application process.

== Description ==
The mortgage broker originates the loan; however, the funding of the loan as well as the decision on the creditworthiness of the loan is handled by the wholesale lender. The name of the wholesale lender typically appears on the loan documents, while the broker acts as an agent for the lender and collects a fee. Broker fees are sometimes collected by adding onto the rate offered by the wholesale lender, with the difference between the broker rate and the lower lender rate going to the broker.
