= Robert Sarver =

American businessman (born 1961)

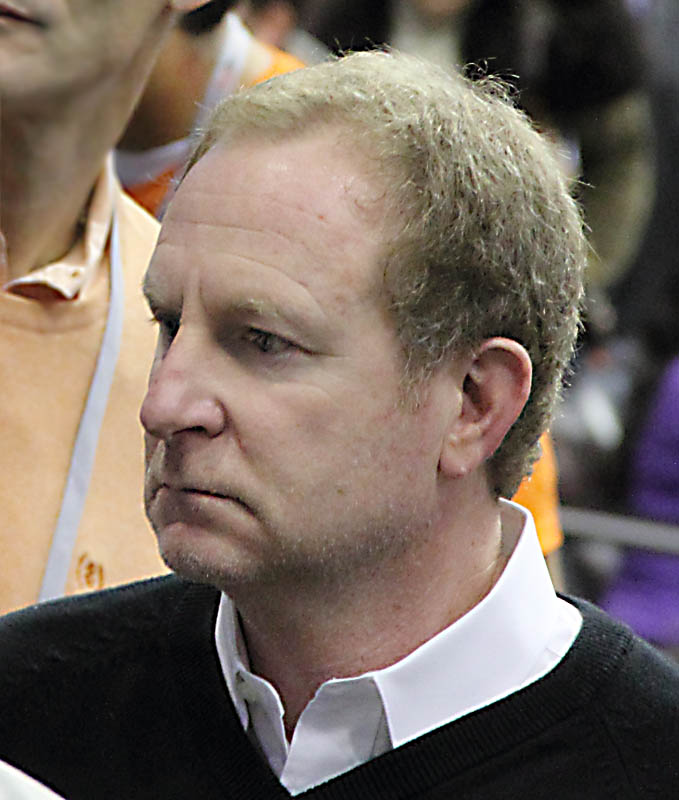
- Sarver in 2011
- Born: October 31, 1961 (age 65); Tucson, Arizona, U.S.
- Education: University of Arizona (BS)
- Occupations: Real estate developer, owner
- Known for: Phoenix Suns, Phoenix Mercury, RCD Mallorca; Co–owner, Southwest Value Partners
- Spouse: Penny Sanders

Robert Gary Sarver (born October 31, 1961) is an American businessman, co-founder of Southwest Value Partners, a real estate development company, and the former owner of the Phoenix Suns of the National Basketball Association (NBA), Phoenix Mercury of the Women's National Basketball Association (WNBA), and RCD Mallorca of La Liga Spanish football team.

== Early life and education ==
Sarver was born and raised in Tucson to Irene and Jack Sarver. Sarver is Jewish. His father was a prominent Tucson businessman, banker, and hotel developer (the elder Sarver built the Aztec Inn, the Plaza International Hotel (now an Aloft Hotel) at Speedway and Campbell in Tucson in the early 1970s, built and operated the Tucson area Howard Johnson's locations, and headed American Savings & Loan Ass'n. as its CEO. Jack Sarver died of a heart attack in 1979; Robert Sarver would eventually donate funds to his alma mater, the University of Arizona's heart research center, which in 1998 was renamed the Sarver Heart Center in honor of his father. Sarver attended his first Phoenix Suns game when he was 8 years old after receiving tickets to his first basketball game on his 8th birthday from one of the team's original co-owners, Donald Diamond; this became a key point in his growing basketball and soccer fandom, including later team ownership within said sports. At age 16, he went to work for his father's company, American Savings and Loan. Sarver is a 1979 graduate of Sabino High School in Tucson, and a 1982 graduate of University of Arizona with a bachelor's degree in business administration. In 1983, Sarver became a certified public accountant.

== Career ==
=== Banking ===
In 1984, Sarver founded the National Bank of Tucson (which he expanded statewide and changed the name to the National Bank of Arizona). In 1994, he sold the National Bank of Arizona, then the largest independent bank in the state, to Zions Bancorporation. In 1995, he acquired Grossmont Bank, one of San Diego's largest community banks. Grossmont was also sold to Zions Bancorporation in 1997. In 1998, Sarver led Zions Bancorporation's acquisition of Sumitomo Bank of California. In 2003, he became chairman of Western Alliance Bancorporation based in Phoenix.

=== Real estate development ===
In 1990, Sarver co-founded the real estate company Southwest Value Partners with Millard Seldin. In 1995, Southwest Value Partners purchased the Emerald Plaza in San Diego. In 2004, his jointly owned real estate firm, Southwest Value Partners, sold the Emerald Plaza and two other San Diego office buildings to Santa Ana real estate firm, Triple Net Properties, for $274.5 million.

=== Phoenix Suns ===
A lifelong sports fan, Sarver's quest to purchase an NBA team began with a conversation with University of Arizona basketball coach Lute Olson. Olson referred Sarver to Steve Kerr, a former player at Arizona and a 15-year NBA veteran, to assist him in buying an NBA franchise. In 2004, he purchased the Phoenix Suns for a then-record $401 million.

In 2020, Sarver and the Suns collaborated with Verizon on a state of the art, 53,000-square foot practice arena called the Verizon 5G Performance Center. The $45 million facility uses 5G technology to merge computer-aided motion analysis, player and ball tracking, and shot tracking to provide precise information to players and coaches. In 2021, Sarver and the Suns oversaw a $230 million renovation and expansion of Footprint Center, formerly known as Talking Stick Resort Arena. The renovations include ultra-modern amenities, premium seating options, themed bars, new suites, and additional social spaces. On top of the physical changes to the arena, there has been an overhaul to the game presentation including enhancements to sound, lighting and video systems. The modernization also included significant improvements to the arena's infrastructure.

In 2021, the Suns reached the NBA Finals for the first time since 1993, losing to the Bucks 4–2.

=== Phoenix Mercury ===
Founded in 1997 by former Suns owner Jerry Colangelo, Sarver purchased the WNBA team alongside the Phoenix Suns in 2004. Of the original eight franchises created at the founding of the WNBA for the inaugural 1997 season, the Phoenix Mercury are one of only three remaining in the 12-team league (along with the New York Liberty and Los Angeles Sparks). Of the twelve WNBA teams, only five share the same majority owner as their NBA counterpart (Indiana Fever, Minnesota Lynx, New York Liberty, Phoenix Mercury, and Washington Mystics). Under Sarver's ownership, the Mercury have won three WNBA championships (2007, 2009, 2014) and won conference titles four times, including during the 2021 season (2007, 2009, 2014, 2021).

=== RCD Mallorca ===
In January 2016, Sarver bought football team RCD Mallorca, at the time in the Spanish second division, for €20 million. Under his poor management early on, the team was briefly demoted to the Segunda División B (the Spanish third division) for the 2017–18 season before returning to the second division the next season. RCD Mallorca returned to La Liga (the Spanish first division) during the 2019–20 season, though they returned to the Segunda División the following season. They have since returned to La Liga as of 2021 and have stayed there as of the 2023–24 season. Initially, Robert Sarver retained his ownership of the RCD Mallorca football team after losing his ownership rights to both Phoenix teams on February 7, 2023, and claimed to not sell his ownership to someone else. However, on July 1 of that year, Sarver let his ownership stake go to former tennis star and RCD Mallorca co-owner Andy Kohlberg, who holds majority ownership of the team going forward.

== Controversies ==
Sarver has been criticized by employees and former employees, agents, and rival executives for his overly hands-on approach to business. He has been accused in one account "of being of an interventionist owner with more authority than expertise, a front office marred by instability, an understaffed scouting department, and a dated facility that isolates the decision-makers from the players and coaches".

On November 4, 2021, Sarver and the Suns were the subject of a report written by Baxter Holmes on ESPN, which accused Sarver and members of the front office of racist and misogynistic behavior, including allegedly announcing his preference for extra-large condoms at a staff meeting. The report was based on interviews with more than 70 employees and former employees of the Suns. Sarver and his legal team denied the vast majority of accusations, citing that there are only a handful of sources on the record and, while the reporter may have reached out to 70 employees, the article provided no evidence that all of them spoke negatively of the organization. Sarver and the Suns welcomed an NBA inquiry to clear up the allegations.

On September 13, 2022, the NBA fined Sarver $10 million and suspended him for one year in both the NBA and the WNBA following an independent investigation into workplace conduct. The investigation concluded that Sarver had repeatedly used a racial slur while recounting or purporting to repeat statements made by other individuals. It also found that he had engaged in repeated workplace conduct that included inappropriate jokes, comments, and discussions, instances of unequal treatment of employees, and conduct that on some occasions constituted bullying. The investigation did not find that every allegation made against Sarver was substantiated, and some allegations were found to be unsupported or could not be corroborated. During the 2022–23 season only, any actions that would normally have required Sarver (such as promoting James Jones from the Suns' general manager to their President of Basketball Operations), were executed by Suns vice chairman and minority owner Sam Garvin instead. NBA players and former NBA players, including LeBron James, then-Suns player Chris Paul, and Draymond Green, said that the punishment was too lenient. PayPal threatened to not renew its partnership with the Suns if Sarver remained as owner. Green asked for a league vote to terminate Sarver as a league owner. On September 21, Sarver announced he would begin the process of selling both the Suns and the Mercury. Sarver eventually accepted the purchase of both teams by United Wholesale Mortgage's CEO Mat Ishbia and his brother Justin for a record-high $4 billion purchasing price on December 20, 2022, with the move being made official on February 7, 2023. Despite no longer owning the Suns or Mercury teams, his suspensions for both the NBA & WNBA were still considered active until September 13, 2023, though Sarver disputed the rest of his suspension period as a result of his ownership ending.

== Advocacy work ==
=== Opposition to Arizona SB-1070 ===
In response to a 2010 Arizona Senate bill called the "Support Our Law Enforcement and Safe Neighborhoods Act", colloquially known as SB-1070, which would make it a state misdemeanor crime for an undocumented person to be in Arizona and obligate police to make an attempt when practicable during a stop, detention or arrest to determine a person's immigration status, the Phoenix Suns adopted special "Los Suns" jerseys on Cinco De Mayo. Sarver also released a scathing rebuke of the law:

... [T]he result of passing this law is that our basic principles of equal rights and protection under the law are being called into question, and Arizona's already struggling economy will suffer even further setbacks at a time when the state can ill-afford them... I looked around our plane and looked at our players and the diversity in our organization. I thought we need to go on record that we honor our diversity in our team, in the NBA and we need to show support for that. As for the political part of that, that's my statement. There are times you need to stand up and be heard. I respect people's views on the other side but I just felt it was appropriate for me to stand up and make a statement.

=== Phoenix Suns Charities ===
In February 2023, Sarver and his wife donated $5 million to Phoenix Suns Charities, the largest single donation the organization has received. He also gave Suns team employees that have stayed with the organization for at least one year a bonus of $20,000 for each individual.

== Personal life ==
In 1996, Sarver married Penny Sanders, a Kansas City, Missouri native; they live in Paradise Valley, Arizona, and have three sons named Max, Jake, and Zach.

== See also ==
- List of people banned or suspended by the NBA

Business positions
Preceded by Jerry Colangelo	Phoenix Suns owner 2004–2023	Succeeded by Mat Ishbia; Justin Ishbia
Preceded by Jerry Colangelo	Phoenix Mercury owner 2004–2023	Succeeded by Mat Ishbia; Justin Ishbia
