= United Wholesale Mortgage =

American mortgage lender

UWM Holdings Corporation
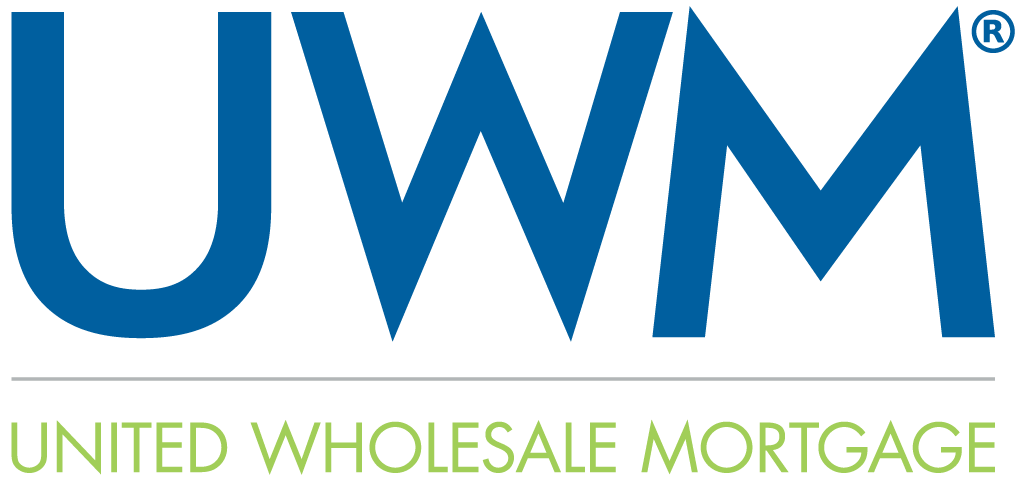
- Trade name: United Wholesale Mortgage
- Formerly: Shore Mortgage
- Type: Public company
- Traded as: NYSE: UWMC; Russell 1000 component
- Industry: Wholesale mortgage
- Founded: 1986; 40 years ago
- Founder: Jeff Ishbia
- Headquarters: Pontiac, Michigan, U.S.
- Key people: Mat Ishbia (CEO)
- Brands: Brand360; EASE; BOLT
- Number of employees: 7,000 (June 30, 2022)
- Website: uwm.com

United Wholesale Mortgage (UWM), formerly United Shore Financial Services, is an American wholesale mortgage lender headquartered in Pontiac, Michigan. UWM underwrites loans for independent brokers, and as of 2024 is the largest mortgage lender in the United States.

== History ==
United Wholesale Mortgage was founded by Jeff Ishbia in 1986 while working as an attorney. He founded the company as a side business under the name Shore Mortgage. The company originally focused on conventional and FHA loans and the name was later changed from Shore Mortgage to United Wholesale Mortgage.

By 2003, United Wholesale Mortgage had 13 employees. It expanded during the 2000s United States housing bubble after larger banks such as Wells Fargo and Bank of America exited the wholesale mortgage lending market.

Jeff's son, Mat Ishbia, served as the president of the company until he was named CEO in 2013. Under the younger Ishbia, UWM grew from a local mortgage lender to a large-scale, national lender.

United Wholesale Mortgage underwrites loans for independent mortgage brokers.

United Wholesale Mortgage went public in January 2021 through a merger with Gores Holdings IV, and the formation of a special-purpose acquisition company. The deal made the company the highest valued company to be purchased by a special purpose acquisition company at the time, and was valued at $16.1 billion.

== Controversies and lawsuits ==
In 2018, UWM settled a lawsuit from account executives who claimed they were not paid overtime while working for the company.

In 2021, Mat Ishbia announced that the company would no longer do business with any broker doing business with competitors Rocket Mortgage and Fairway Independent Mortgage. At the time, Ishbia claimed the decision was due to the practices of those companies, including working directly with realtors instead of mortgage brokers in securing home loans. In response, a lawsuit seeking class action status was filed against UWM and Ishbia in 2021.

In 2022, UWM sued America’s MoneyLine, alleging that the mortgage brokerage had violated its agreement with UWM by continuing to do business with Rocket Mortgage. America’s MoneyLine filed a countersuit against UWM. In 2023, UWM won a partial ruling in the litigation.

In 2023, UWM and individuals associated with the company were named in a shareholder lawsuit regarding the company's SPAC merger. The lawsuit alleged breaches of fiduciary duty in connection with the transaction.

Also in 2023, media reports described allegations by former and current employees concerning workplace culture at the company, including allegations of sexism and racial issues. UWM disputed the allegations.
