= Justin Ishbia =

American businessman

- Born: Justin Ryan Ishbia; 1977 or 1978 (age 48–49)
- Education: Michigan State University (BA); Vanderbilt University (JD)
- Relatives: Mat Ishbia (brother)

Justin Ryan Ishbia (born 1977/1978) is an American businessman and private equity investor who is a founding partner of Shore Capital Partners. He is a part majority owner of the Phoenix Suns of the National Basketball Association and Phoenix Mercury of the Women's National Basketball Association along with his brother Mat Ishbia. He is also a minority owner of the Nashville SC of Major League Soccer and the Chicago White Sox of Major League Baseball.

== Biography ==
Ishbia was raised in a Jewish family in Birmingham, Michigan, a suburb of Detroit. He played high school baseball at Seaholm High School in Birmingham. He graduated with a Bachelor of Arts from the Eli Broad College of Business at Michigan State University and a Juris Doctor from Vanderbilt University School of Law. He also earned a certificate from Vanderbilt's Owen Graduate School of Management. After school, he worked as an attorney. He is a founding partner in the Chicago-based private equity firm, Shore Capital Partners.

In 2021, Ishbia and his brother, Mat Ishbia, bought a small stake in the Chicago White Sox of Major League Baseball (MLB). Their purchase was not reported until January 2025.

In May 2022, Ishbia and his brother were reported to be among the bidders to buy the Denver Broncos of the National Football League. The following month, it was announced that the Broncos were being sold to a consortium led by former Walmart chairman Rob Walton for $4.65 billion.

In December 2022, Ishbia and his brother agreed to purchase the Phoenix Suns and the Phoenix Mercury from Robert Sarver for $4.0 billion. His role is alternate governor for the team as well as investor in the organization. The deal to the Ishbia brothers was approved by the NBA on February 6, 2023.

He owns a 22% interest in United Wholesale Mortgage, a company founded by his father and now headed by his brother. Forbes listed his net worth as of June 2024 at US$5.4 billion.

During the 2024–25 MLB offseason, it was reported that Ishbia and his brother were interested in purchasing the Minnesota Twins from the Pohlad family. However, by February 2025, the brothers had stopped pursuing the purchase and Ishbia was reportedly interested instead in increasing his stake in the White Sox. In June 2025, Ishbia reached an agreement with Chicago White Sox majority owner Jerry Reinsdorf that established the framework for Ishbia to take over a controlling stake in the White Sox after 2029.

== Philanthropy ==
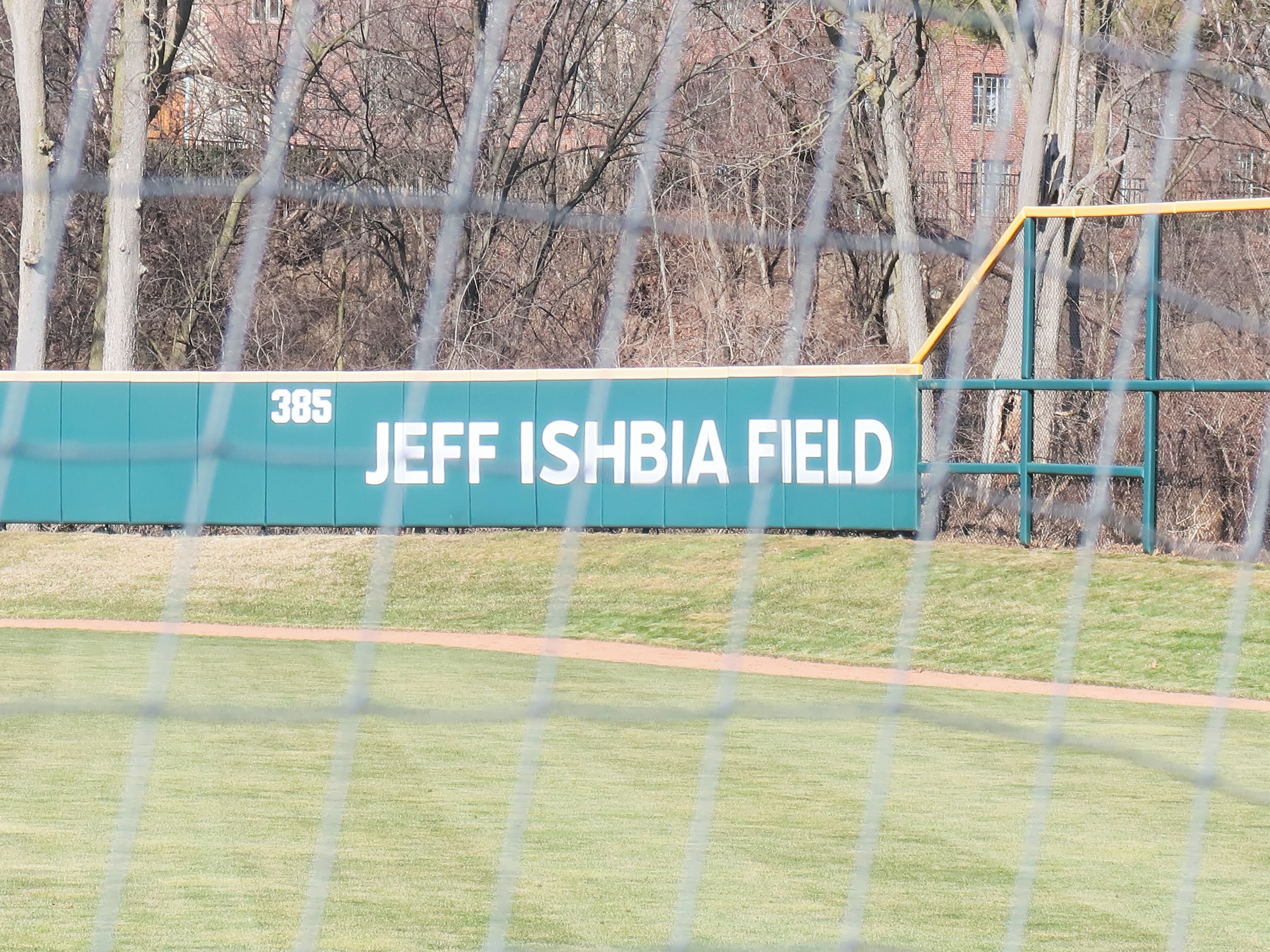
The field at Drayton McLane Baseball Stadium was renamed Jeff Ishbia Field in honor of Ishbia's father after Ishbia's donation to the school.

In October 2021, Ishbia donated $10 million to his alma mater, Vanderbilt Law School. He had earlier established a scholarship fund at the school through a donation he made in 2015. In January 2022, Ishbia matched his brother Mat Ishbia's $1 million donation to the V Foundation, supporting cancer research." In 2024, Ishbia donated $10 million to his alma mater Michigan State University.

Sporting positions
Preceded by Robert Sarver	Phoenix Suns owner 2023–present Served alongside: Mat Ishbia	Incumbent
Preceded by Robert Sarver	Phoenix Mercury owner 2023–present Served alongside: Mat Ishbia	Incumbent
