= Mat Ishbia =

American businessman and NBA owner (born 1980)

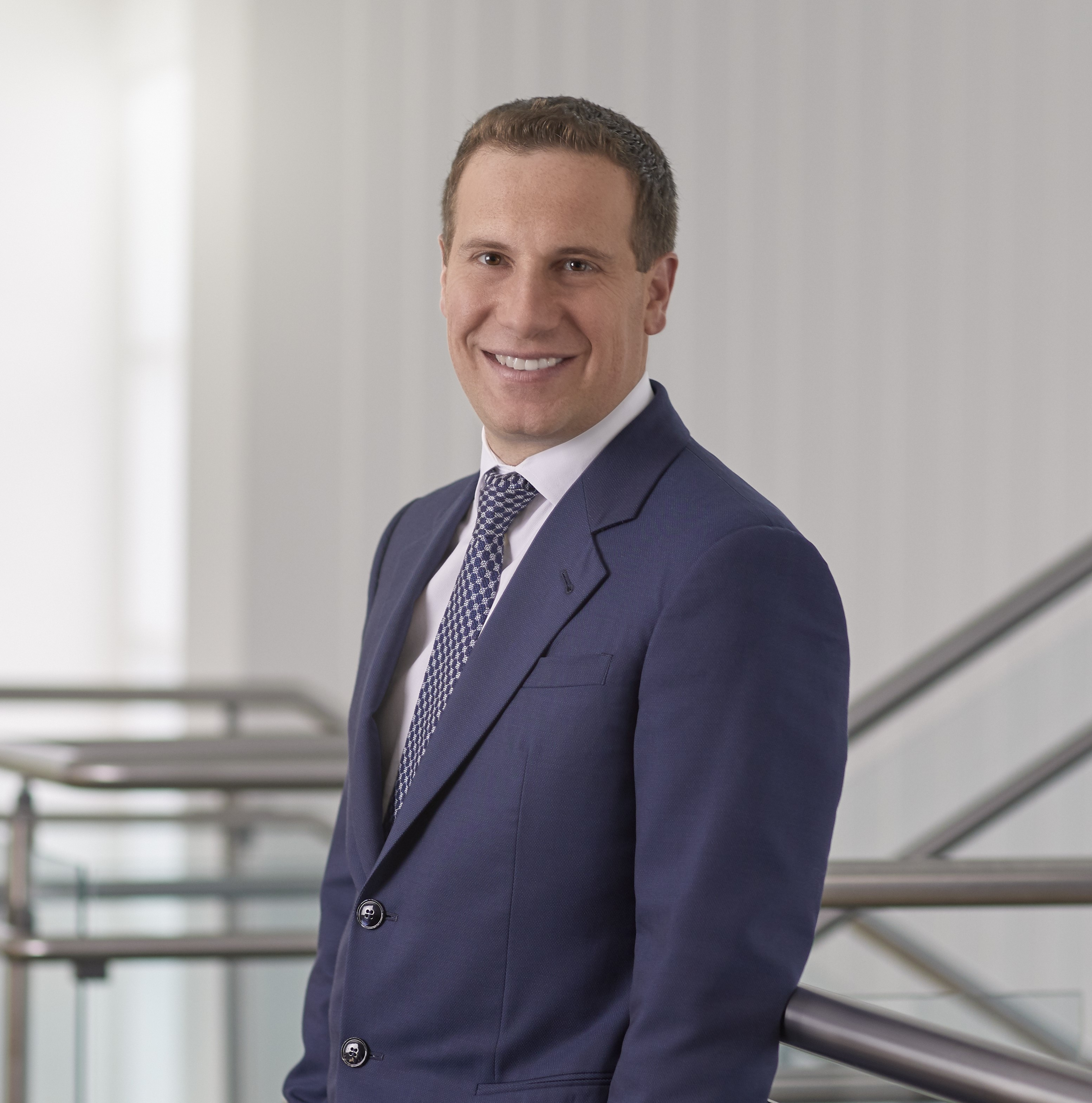
- Ishbia in 2020
- Born: Mathew Randall Ishbia; 6 January 1980 (age 46)
- Education: Michigan State University (BS)
- Known for: CEO and chairman of United Wholesale Mortgage; Majority owner of the Phoenix Suns of the NBA and the Phoenix Mercury of the WNBA
- Family: Justin Ishbia (brother)
- Basketball career

Personal information
- Listed height: 5 ft 10 in (1.78 m)
- Listed weight: 175 lb (79 kg)

Career information
- High school: Seaholm (Birmingham, Michigan)
- College: Michigan State (1999–2002)
- Position: Point guard
- Number: 11

Career highlights
- NCAA champion (2000)

Mathew Randall Ishbia (born 6 January, 1980) is an American businessman who is CEO and chairman of mortgage lender United Wholesale Mortgage. He is the majority owner of the Phoenix Suns of the NBA and Phoenix Mercury of the WNBA alongside his older brother, Justin.

== Early life and education ==
Ishbia was raised in a Jewish family in Birmingham, Michigan. He played basketball as a walk-on point guard for Michigan State from 1999 to 2002 and was a member of the team that won the national championship in 2000.

== Career ==
In 2013, Ishbia was named the chief executive officer (CEO) of United Wholesale Mortgage (UWM), an American mortgage lender founded by his father in 1986. In 2015, under his leadership, the company became the leading wholesale mortgage lender in the United States. In 2019, Ishbia published his debut book titled "Running the Corporate Offense: Lessons in Effective Leadership from the Bench to the Board Room."

Ishbia became a billionaire in 2021 when UWM became a publicly traded company. In 2021, he announced that UWM would no longer do business with any broker doing business with competitors Rocket Mortgage and Fairway Independent Mortgage, leading to a lawsuit filed by brokers a month later.

The same year, Ishbia and his brother bought a small stake in the Chicago White Sox. Their purchase was not reported until January 2025.

In December 2022, Ishbia's bid was accepted to purchase the NBA's Phoenix Suns and WNBA's Phoenix Mercury basketball teams for $4 billion, pending league approval. The NBA approved the sale on February 6, 2023. Cleveland Cavaliers owner Dan Gilbert, who is also the CEO of Rocket Mortgage, abstained from voting.

During Game 4 of the Suns 2023 playoff series against the Denver Nuggets, Ishbia was involved in an altercation with Nuggets player Nikola Jokić. During the game, Suns player Josh Okogie crashed into the seats while trying to save a loose ball. He landed in a group of fans on the baseline that included Ishbia, who grabbed the basketball. Jokić tried to take the ball away from Ishbia, resulting in the ball flying backward into the crowd and Ishbia being knocked backward by Jokić's elbow. Jokić was then assessed a technical foul and was fined $25,000 the next day.

Forbes lists his net worth as of April 2026 at US$9.1 billion. When the Arizona Coyotes of the NHL suspended operations in the Phoenix area and relocated their assets to Salt Lake City, Ishbia announced his interest in reviving an NHL franchise in the Phoenix area.

== Philanthropy ==
On February 4, 2021, Ishbia donated $32 million to Michigan State University, the largest one-time commitment from an individual. $20 million of the donation was earmarked for a new Tom Izzo Basketball Building. A month later, on March 12, Ishbia donated $1 million to the V Foundation for Cancer Research.

That April, Ishbia donated $500,000 to the Sylvester Broome Empowerment Village Sportsplex in Flint, Michigan.

In November 2021, Ishbia agreed to donate an additional $14 million to Michigan State University. He disclosed the donation was to retain head football coach Mel Tucker which was later confirmed through a legal battle to obtain donation records originally denied by MSU through a FOIA.

== Personal life ==
Ishbia and his wife, Emily, married in 2014. They had two sons and a daughter together. The couple divorced in 2023.

Sporting positions
Preceded by Robert Sarver	Phoenix Suns owner (with Justin Ishbia); 2023–present	Incumbent
Preceded by Robert Sarver	Phoenix Mercury owner (with Justin Ishbia); 2023–present	Incumbent
