= 2021–22 Phoenix Suns season =

Professional basketball season

- Division champions
- Head coach: Monty Williams
- General manager: James Jones
- Owners: Robert Sarver
- Arena: Footprint Center

Results
- Record: 64–18 (.780)
- Place: Division: 1st (Pacific); Conference: 1st (Western)
- Playoff finish: Conference semifinals (lost to Mavericks 3–4)
- Stats at Basketball Reference

Local media
- Television: Bally Sports Arizona
- Radio: KTAR

The 2021–22 Phoenix Suns season was their 54th season of the franchise in the National Basketball Association (NBA), as well as their 29th season at the currently named Footprint Center, their first full season under that name after taking over the naming rights to the previously named Phoenix Suns Arena on July 16, 2021, during the 2021 NBA Finals.

The Suns entered the season as the defending Western Conference champions and were attempting to return to the NBA Finals for the second consecutive year. On March 24, with a win over the Denver Nuggets, the Phoenix Suns clinched the #1 spot in the Western Conference and the league for the first time since 2005. With the Suns 63rd win over the Los Angeles Lakers on April 5 (which, coincidentally, also eliminated the Lakers from playoff/play-in contention), the Suns set a franchise record for most wins in a season, surpassing the 1992–93 and 2004–05 teams with 62.

In the playoffs, the Suns defeated the New Orleans Pelicans in six games in the first round, but were then upset by the 4th-seeded Dallas Mavericks in the conference semifinals, where they lost in seven games, becoming the third team to have 64 or more wins and not reach the conference finals after the 2006–07 Dallas Mavericks and 2015–16 San Antonio Spurs.

== Off-season ==
=== Draft ===
Round	Pick	Player	Position(s)	Nationality	College / Club
1	29	Day'Ron Sharpe	Center	United States	North Carolina

The Suns entered the draft with one first-round selection. Per a 2018 trade, their original second-round selection was to the Brooklyn Nets as it landed outside the picks 31 to 35 restriction.

The Suns later agreed to trade their 29th pick and Jevon Carter to the Brooklyn Nets in exchange for Landry Shamet.

=== Free agency ===
For this season, free agency began over a month later than it usually does, starting on August 2, 2021, at 6:00 P.M. EST instead of by June 30 or July 1 like in previous free agency periods due to the aftermath of the 2019–20 NBA season suspension affecting some of the timing for a few things with this season's offseason period. However, instead of starting the free agency period to something like July 31 akin to last season's free agency period starting two days after the last season's draft back on November 20, 2020, free agency began on the proper five days off before free agency begins. Furthermore, official signings were made four days after the starting free agency period (which in this case began on August 6, 2021, instead of by late November like last season), which was on schedule for the five day moratorium period the NBA holds. For this season, the Suns had (starting with the most expensive players downward) E'Twaun Moore, Langston Galloway, Cameron Payne, Abdel Nader, Frank Kaminsky III, and Torrey Craig all entering free agency this year due to all of them signing (or agreeing to) their veteran's minimum salaries for their respective deals last season. In addition to them, superstar point guard Chris Paul also declined his player's option that would have allowed him to get $44,211,146 in the final season of his massive contract he first signed back when he was with the Houston Rockets in 2018, though he's expected to receive a 3-year deal worth $90 million with the Suns in free agency. Not only that, in addition to all of these players, Ty-Shon Alexander's two-way contract was projected to go into its second year with Phoenix, which initially left them only one likely open two-way contract for the season earlier on.

On August 2, the Suns agreed to new deals for not just back-up point guard Cameron Payne, but also All-Star point guard Chris Paul, both of which became official by August 6. With Payne, his new deal gave him a three-year contract that's worth a total of $19 million, with his third year only guaranteeing him $2 million out of $6,500,000 that would be received there. However, with Chris Paul, his new contract allows him to receive a partially guaranteed four-year deal that would fully grant him up to $120 million, though only his first two years are fully guaranteed, with his third year being partially guaranteed (half of his salary is fully guaranteed for that season) and his final season in that deal being non-guaranteed. Not only that, but they also agreed to sign Denver Nuggets center JaVale McGee (who was also a part of Team U.S.A. for the 2020 Summer Olympics alongside Devin Booker) to a one-year deal for $5 million, though his agreement on August 2 was made official on August 16 instead. However, the Suns also lost Torrey Craig to the Indiana Pacers on August 2, with Craig agreeing to sign a two-year deal worth $10 million for Indiana, which was made official by August 20. A day after that, the Suns also re-signed Abdel Nader to a two-year deal worth $4,200,000 (second year being a team option), with his signing also being official on August 6. On August 5, Frank Kaminsky III agreed to another one-year deal worth his veteran's minimum to return to Phoenix, with former Suns point guard Elfrid Payton agreeing to a one-year deal worth his own veteran's minimum to reunite with the Suns, albeit as a third-string point guard this time around. Kaminsky's deal was made official by August 9, while Payton's was completed a day later.

On August 26, the Suns announced that they had officially waived Ty-Shon Alexander from his second year of his two-way contract he had signed from his previous season with the team. On September 7, the Suns confirmed that they replaced Alexander's spot with that of former Washington Wizards (and technically San Antonio Spurs) player Chandler Hutchison as a two-way contract player for this season only due to it being his last eligible year for such a contract, with Ty-Shon Alexander confirmed to join the Segafredo Virtus Bologna in Italy later on that same day. The next day, E'Twaun Moore agreed to a one-year deal to return to the Orlando Magic after last playing with Orlando from 2012 to 2014. On September 22, Chasson Randle was confirmed to be a training camp signing for the Suns that's looking to gain a spot on the roster properly in October, which was made official on September 26. However, Randle was officially waived after their preseason ended on October 16. Then, on September 24, Langston Galloway was confirmed to sign a training camp deal with the Golden State Warriors, though he was waived from the Warriors on October 9. With regards to rookie scale contract extensions, Mikal Bridges was given a 4-year, $90 million extension with the Suns on October 17, while Landry Shamet was given a 4-year, $43 million extension with Phoenix a day later. However, Deandre Ayton failed to get a contract extension of his own before the deadline passed, making him a restricted free agent entering next season. On October 22, the Suns filled their second two-way contract with small power forward Ish Wainright, a Ugandan-American that previously last played for the SIG Strasbourg in France before signing a non-guaranteed contract with the Toronto Raptors in the preseason.

=== Coaching changes ===
During the 2021 NBA Finals run on July 12, assistant coach Willie Green agreed to become the new head coach of the New Orleans Pelicans to enter this season. On July 25, the Suns agreed to hire Minnesota Timberwolves assistant coach Bryan Gates as a replacement to Willie Green going forward entering this season. On August 7, the Suns officially announced not just the promotion of Kevin Young to Willie Green's former position of associate head coach and the confirmed hiring of Bryan Gates, but also hired former NBA and NBA G League Ignite player Jarrett Jack and Oklahoma City Thunder player development coach Steve Scalzi to initially round out the rest of the coaching staff. On August 22, player development coach Riccardo Fois officially left his position with the Suns to become an assistant coach for the University of Arizona's Wildcats men's basketball team. Finally, on September 24, the Suns confirmed that both Riccardo Fois and Ben Strong left their positions as player development coaches for the team, being replaced by the Suns' assistant video coordinator Corey Vinson and the Portland Trail Blazers' video coordinator and player development coach Jamal Gross as a combination of video coordinator and player development coaches for the team. Not only that, but Fort Wayne Mad Ants assistant coach Michael Ruffin was confirmed to be the official assistant coach replacement for Steve Blake, with Jarrett Jack joining Steve Scalzi as player development assistant coaches going into this season.

=== Front offices changes and Robert Sarver controversy ===
On July 24, Jeff Bower had a mutual agreement with the Suns to officially leave his position as Vice President of Basketball Operations for them going forward. With Larry Fitzgerald confirmed to not be playing in the NFL for at least the majority of the 2021 Arizona Cardinals season, it is presumed likely that Fitzgerald will be given a much greater role with the Suns franchise going into this season under Robert Sarver's ownership group. However, a report from Jordan Schultz on October 22, 2021, suggested that ESPN was going to release a major exposé piece on majority team owner Robert Sarver with regards to rampant racism, sexism, and misogyny involved with him on the team both on and off the court throughout his entire tenure as team owner. While Sarver and other front office members explicitly denied any problems in mind there before the report's release, the actual report on Sarver was released on November 4, detailing all the problems involved with the majority of his time there. While Sarver and a majority of team personnel released public statements on their official website in response to the allegations at hand, the NBA began their investigations on the team's executive conduct the same day ESPN's report was released.

== Roster ==
2021–22 Phoenix Suns roster
Players

Pos.	No.	Player	Height	Weight	DOB	From
C	22	Deandre Ayton	6 ft 11 in (2.11 m)	250 lb (113 kg)	1998-07-23	Arizona
C	18	Bismack Biyombo	6 ft 8 in (2.03 m)	255 lb (116 kg)	1992-08-28	Democratic Republic of the Congo
G	1	Devin Booker	6 ft 5 in (1.96 m)	206 lb (93 kg)	1996-10-30	Kentucky
F	25	Mikal Bridges	6 ft 6 in (1.98 m)	209 lb (95 kg)	1996-08-30	Villanova
G	0	Torrey Craig	6 ft 7 in (2.01 m)	221 lb (100 kg)	1990-12-19	USC Upstate
F	99	Jae Crowder	6 ft 6 in (1.98 m)	235 lb (107 kg)	1990-07-06	Marquette
G	4	Aaron Holiday	6 ft 0 in (1.83 m)	185 lb (84 kg)	1996-09-30	UCLA
F	23	Cameron Johnson	6 ft 8 in (2.03 m)	210 lb (95 kg)	1996-03-03	North Carolina
G	19	Gabriel Lundberg (TW)	6 ft 4 in (1.93 m)	203 lb (92 kg)	1994-12-04	Denmark
C	00	JaVale McGee	7 ft 0 in (2.13 m)	270 lb (122 kg)	1988-01-19	Nevada
G	3	Chris Paul	6 ft 0 in (1.83 m)	175 lb (79 kg)	1985-05-06	Wake Forest
G	15	Cameron Payne	6 ft 1 in (1.85 m)	183 lb (83 kg)	1994-08-08	Murray State
G	2	Elfrid Payton	6 ft 3 in (1.91 m)	195 lb (88 kg)	1994-02-22	Louisiana
F	20	Dario Šarić	6 ft 10 in (2.08 m)	225 lb (102 kg)	1994-04-08	Croatia
G	14	Landry Shamet	6 ft 4 in (1.93 m)	190 lb (86 kg)	1997-03-13	Wichita State
F	12	Ish Wainright	6 ft 5 in (1.96 m)	250 lb (113 kg)	1994-09-12	Baylor

Coaches
Head coach
- Monty Williams
Assistant(s)
- Randy Ayers
- Mark Bryant
- Bryan Gates
- Jarrett Jack
- Brian Randle
- Michael Ruffin
- Kevin Young (associate)

Legend
- (DP) Unsigned draft pick
- (FA) Free agent
- (S) Suspended
- (GL) On assignment to G League affiliate
- (TW) Two-way affiliate player
- Injured

Roster
Updated: April 10, 2022

=== Salaries ===
Player	2021–22 Salary
Devin Booker	$31,650,600
Chris Paul	$30,800,000
Deandre Ayton	$12,632,950
Jae Crowder	$9,720,900
Dario Šarić	$8,510,000
Cameron Payne	$6,500,000
Mikal Bridges	$5,557,725
JaVale McGee	$5,000,000
Jalen Smith	$4,458,000
Cameron Johnson	$4,437,000
Landry Shamet	$3,768,342
Elfrid Payton	$2,389,641
Frank Kaminsky III	$2,239,544
Abdel Nader	$2,000,000
Chandler Hutchison	$462,629
Ish Wainright	$462,629
Total	$129,664,702

For this season, the salary cap was set at $112,414,000, with the luxury tax line now being set at $136,606,000.

== Preseason ==
After dealing with some changes to the preseason format for last season due to the COVID-19 pandemic, the NBA made sure to get their preseason period back into its proper starting point in early October going from this season onward, which includes a healthy number of preseason games to start things out there. While the Suns were still playing in the 2021 NBA playoffs, the Los Angeles Lakers revealed their preseason schedule on June 29, which included a match with the Suns at home on October 6 and a road match in Los Angeles on October 10. Not only that, but on August 17, the Portland Trail Blazers revealed in their preseason schedule that the Suns would play at home against Portland on October 13, with them both revealing they were their final, respective preseason opponents this time around. Then on August 19, the Sacramento Kings revealed they were the first opponent the Suns will have in the preseason with a road game in Sacramento to start things out there. The Phoenix Suns later revealed those four games of theirs were officially their preseason schedule on August 25.

Before the start of their preseason period, Devin Booker was confirmed to be infected with COVID-19 despite getting the COVID-19 vaccine earlier in the previous season alongside the rest of the team playing there. Despite being able to return to practice early, Booker was held out for at least the majority of the preseason period, returning to play for only the final preseason game. Not only that, but the Suns' home games had to be moved to earlier times than originally scheduled due to the team focusing on their matches as doubleheader matches, with the Phoenix Mercury being considered the main events due to them competing in the 2021 WNBA Playoffs against the Las Vegas Aces and Chicago Sky after the Suns' respective matches against the Lakers and Trail Blazers on October 6 & 13. While their first and last preseason games on October 4 & 13 did not air on TV this season, the Suns had their preseason matches against the Lakers air on NBA TV and ESPN respectively for their October 6 & 10 games. After struggling against the Kings to start the preseason, Phoenix won both of their matches against the Lakers (even blowing the Lakers out 123–94 in their second match) before blowing out the Trail Blazers in a 119–74 win at home, finishing the preseason with a 3–1 record.

2021 preseason game log
Total: 3–1 (home: 2–0; road: 1–1)
Preseason: 3–1 (home: 2–0; road: 1–1)

Game	Date	Team	Score	High points	High rebounds	High assists	Location Attendance	Record
1	October 4	@ Sacramento	L 106–117	Shamet, Smith (13)	Jalen Smith (11)	Cameron Payne (7)	Golden 1 Center; 17,583	0–1
2	October 6	L.A. Lakers	W 117–105	Mikal Bridges (15)	Deandre Ayton (11)	Chris Paul (11)	Footprint Center; 12,434	1–1
3	October 10	@ L.A. Lakers	W 123–94	Chris Paul (15)	Ayton, McGee, Smith (9)	Cameron Payne (7)	Staples Center; 13,844	2–1
4	October 13	Portland	W 119–74	Devin Booker (17)	Deandre Ayton (11)	Elfrid Payton (9)	Footprint Center; 9,772	3–1

2021–22 season schedule

== Regular season ==
=== Game log ===
2021–22 game log
Total: 64–18 (home: 32–9; road: 32–9)
October: 2–3 (home: 1–2; road: 1–1)

Game	Date	Team	Score	High points	High rebounds	High assists	Location Attendance	Record
1	October 20	Denver	L 98–110	Mikal Bridges (16)	Crowder, McGee (8)	Chris Paul (10)	Footprint Center; 16,074	0–1
2	October 22	@ L.A. Lakers	W 115–105	Chris Paul (23)	Deandre Ayton (15)	Chris Paul (14)	Staples Center; 18,997	1–1
3	October 23	@ Portland	L 105–134	Devin Booker (21)	Frank Kaminsky III (5)	Chris Paul (11)	Moda Center; 18,558	1–2
4	October 27	Sacramento	L 107–110	Devin Booker (31)	Deandre Ayton (21)	Booker, Paul (8)	Footprint Center; 14,678	1–3
5	October 30	Cleveland	W 101–92	Devin Booker (27)	Deandre Ayton (12)	Chris Paul (10)	Footprint Center; 14,516	2–3

November: 16–0 (home: 8–0; road: 8–0)

Game	Date	Team	Score	High points	High rebounds	High assists	Location Attendance	Record
6	November 2	New Orleans	W 112–100	Mikal Bridges (22)	Booker, Crowder (8)	Chris Paul (18)	Footprint Center; 14,323	3–3
7	November 4	Houston	W 123–111	Devin Booker (27)	Deandre Ayton (11)	Chris Paul (13)	Footprint Center; 15,058	4–3
8	November 6	Atlanta	W 121–117	Devin Booker (38)	Jae Crowder (8)	Chris Paul (13)	Footprint Center; 15,412	5–3
9	November 8	@ Sacramento	W 109–104	Cameron Payne (24)	Devin Booker (9)	Devin Booker (6)	Golden 1 Center; 13,566	6–3
10	November 10	Portland	W 119–109	Frank Kaminsky (31)	Booker, McGee (8)	Chris Paul (7)	Footprint Center; 15,672	7–3
11	November 12	@ Memphis	W 119–94	Booker, Crowder (17)	Cameron Johnson (7)	Chris Paul (12)	FedExForum; 15,886	8–3
12	November 14	@ Houston	W 115–89	Devin Booker (26)	JaVale McGee (14)	Devin Booker (6)	Toyota Center; 16,088	9–3
13	November 15	@ Minnesota	W 99–96	Devin Booker (29)	Deandre Ayton (12)	Chris Paul (8)	Target Center; 16,279	10–3
14	November 17	Dallas	W 105–98	Devin Booker (24)	Deandre Ayton (13)	Chris Paul (14)	Footprint Center; 18,055	11–3
15	November 19	Dallas	W 112–104	Booker, Bridges (19)	Deandre Ayton (17)	Chris Paul (14)	Footprint Center; 17,071	12–3
16	November 21	Denver	W 126–97	Cameron Johnson (22)	Deandre Ayton (8)	Chris Paul (10)	Footprint Center; 16,072	13–3
17	November 22	@ San Antonio	W 115–111	Devin Booker (23)	Deandre Ayton (14)	Landry Shamet (5)	AT&T Center; 14,715	14–3
18	November 24	@ Cleveland	W 120–115	Devin Booker (35)	JaVale McGee (12)	Chris Paul (12)	Rocket Mortgage FieldHouse; 18,055	15–3
19	November 26	@ New York	W 118–97	Devin Booker (32)	Deandre Ayton (13)	Chris Paul (10)	Madison Square Garden; 19,812	16–3
20	November 27	@ Brooklyn	W 113–107	Devin Booker (30)	JaVale McGee (10)	Chris Paul (11)	Barclays Center; 18,071	17–3
21	November 30	Golden State	W 104–96	Deandre Ayton (24)	Deandre Ayton (11)	Chris Paul (5)	Footprint Center; 17,071	18–3

December: 9–5 (home: 7–2; road: 2–3)

Game	Date	Team	Score	High points	High rebounds	High assists	Location Attendance	Record
22	December 2	Detroit	W 114–103	Johnson, Payne (19)	Deandre Ayton (12)	Chris Paul (12)	Footprint Center; 16,081	19–3
23	December 3	@ Golden State	L 96–118	Deandre Ayton (23)	JaVale McGee (7)	Chris Paul (8)	Chase Center; 18,064	19–4
24	December 6	San Antonio	W 108–104	Chris Paul (21)	Ayton, Bridges (9)	Chris Paul (10)	Footprint Center; 15,292	20–4
25	December 10	Boston	W 111–90	JaVale McGee (21)	JaVale McGee (15)	Chris Paul (12)	Footprint Center; 17,071	21–4
26	December 13	@ L.A. Clippers	L 96–111	Cameron Johnson (17)	JaVale McGee (13)	Chris Paul (8)	Staples Center; 17,909	21–5
27	December 14	@ Portland	W 111–107 (OT)	Deandre Ayton (28)	Deandre Ayton (13)	Chris Paul (14)	Moda Center; 16,184	22–5
28	December 16	Washington	W 118–98	JaVale McGee (17)	Deandre Ayton (10)	Cameron Johnson (5)	Footprint Center; 16,177	23–5
29	December 19	Charlotte	W 137–106	JaVale McGee (19)	Deandre Ayton (15)	Chris Paul (9)	Footprint Center; 17,071	24–5
30	December 21	@ L.A. Lakers	W 108–90	Devin Booker (24)	Deandre Ayton (11)	Chris Paul (9)	Staples Center; 18,997	25–5
31	December 23	Oklahoma City	W 113–101	Devin Booker (30)	Deandre Ayton (12)	Booker, Paul (7)	Footprint Center; 17,071	26–5
32	December 25	Golden State	L 107–116	Chris Paul (21)	Ayton. McGee (7)	Chris Paul (8)	Footprint Center; 17,071	26–6
33	December 27	Memphis	L 103–104	Devin Booker (30)	Jalen Smith (9)	Chris Paul (13)	Footprint Center; 17,071	26–7
34	December 29	Oklahoma City	W 115–97	Devin Booker (38)	Jalen Smith (14)	Cameron Payne (7)	Footprint Center; 17,071	27–7
35	December 31	@ Boston	L 108–123	Devin Booker (22)	Jalen Smith (7)	Chris Paul (8)	TD Garden; 19,156	27–8

January: 13–1 (home: 5–1; road: 8–0)

Game	Date	Team	Score	High points	High rebounds	High assists	Location Attendance	Record
36	January 2	@ Charlotte	W 133–99	Devin Booker (24)	Jalen Smith (12)	Chris Paul (16)	Spectrum Center; 19,088	28–8
37	January 4	@ New Orleans	W 123–110	Devin Booker (33)	Devin Booker (9)	Chris Paul (15)	Smoothie King Center; 15,158	29–8
38	January 6	L.A. Clippers	W 106–89	Cameron Johnson (24)	Jalen Smith (14)	Chris Paul (10)	Footprint Center; 17,071	30–8
39	January 8	Miami	L 100–123	Devin Booker (26)	Deandre Ayton (8)	Chris Paul (7)	Footprint Center; 17,071	30–9
40	January 11	@ Toronto	W 99–95	Jae Crowder (19)	Deandre Ayton (9)	Chris Paul (12)	Scotiabank Arena; 0	31–9
41	January 14	@ Indiana	W 112–94	Devin Booker (35)	Ayton, Smith (12)	Chris Paul (9)	Gainbridge Fieldhouse; 14,019	32–9
42	January 16	@ Detroit	W 135–108	Devin Booker (30)	Jae Crowder (11)	Chris Paul (6)	Little Caesars Arena; 18,178	33–9
43	January 17	@ San Antonio	W 121–107	Devin Booker (48)	Bismack Biyombo (14)	Chris Paul (12)	AT&T Center; 10,422	34–9
44	January 20	@ Dallas	W 109–101	Devin Booker (28)	Mikal Bridges (8)	Chris Paul (11)	American Airlines Center; 19,584	35–9
45	January 22	Indiana	W 113–103	Mikal Bridges (23)	Bismack Biyombo (13)	Chris Paul (16)	Footprint Center; 17,071	36–9
46	January 24	Utah	W 115–109	Devin Booker (33)	Bismack Biyombo (13)	Chris Paul (14)	Footprint Center; 17,071	37–9
47	January 26	@ Utah	W 105–97	Devin Booker (43)	Devin Booker (12)	Chris Paul (5)	Vivint Arena; 18,306	38–9
48	January 28	Minnesota	W 134–124	Devin Booker (29)	Bismack Biyombo (12)	Chris Paul (14)	Footprint Center; 17,071	39–9
49	January 30	San Antonio	W 115–110	Devin Booker (28)	Bismack Biyombo (11)	Chris Paul (19)	Footprint Center; 17,071	40–9

February: 9–3 (home: 5–2; road: 4–1)

Game	Date	Team	Score	High points	High rebounds	High assists	Location Attendance	Record
50	February 1	Brooklyn	W 121–111	Devin Booker (35)	Mikal Bridges (8)	Chris Paul (14)	Footprint Center; 17,071	41–9
51	February 3	@ Atlanta	L 115–124	Devin Booker (32)	Deandre Ayton (9)	Chris Paul (12)	State Farm Arena; 16,958	41–10
52	February 5	@ Washington	W 95–80	Deandre Ayton (20)	Deandre Ayton (16)	Chris Paul (9)	Capital One Arena; 18,058	42–10
53	February 7	@ Chicago	W 127–124	Devin Booker (38)	Jae Crowder (10)	Chris Paul (11)	United Center; 20,615	43–10
54	February 8	@ Philadelphia	W 114–109	Devin Booker (35)	Jae Crowder (14)	Chris Paul (12)	Wells Fargo Center; 20,720	44–10
55	February 10	Milwaukee	W 131–107	Deandre Ayton (27)	Crowder, Johnson (8)	Chris Paul (19)	Footprint Center; 17,071	45–10
56	February 12	Orlando	W 132–105	Devin Booker (26)	Deandre Ayton (10)	Chris Paul (15)	Footprint Center; 17,071	46–10
57	February 15	L.A. Clippers	W 103–96	Devin Booker (26)	Deandre Ayton (12)	Chris Paul (14)	Footprint Center; 17,071	47–10
58	February 16	Houston	W 124–121	Devin Booker (24)	Deandre Ayton (9)	Devin Booker (8)	Footprint Center; 17,071	48–10
All-Star Game
59	February 24	@ Oklahoma City	W 124–104	Devin Booker (25)	Ayton, McGee (8)	Devin Booker (12)	Paycom Center; 14,176	49–10
60	February 25	New Orleans	L 102–117	Devin Booker (30)	Torrey Craig (11)	Mikal Bridges (6)	Footprint Center; 17,071	49–11
61	February 27	Utah	L 114–118	Devin Booker (30)	Ayton, Booker, McGee (7)	Devin Booker (7)	Footprint Center; 17,071	49–12

March: 13–2 (home: 5–1; road: 8–1)

Game	Date	Team	Score	High points	High rebounds	High assists	Location Attendance	Record
62	March 2	Portland	W 120–90	Cameron Johnson (20)	JaVale McGee (9)	Aaron Holiday (9)	Footprint Center; 17,071	50–12
63	March 4	New York	W 115–114	Cameron Johnson (38)	Jae Crowder (7)	Cameron Payne (16)	Footprint Center; 17,071	51–12
64	March 6	@ Milwaukee	L 122–132	Deandre Ayton (30)	Deandre Ayton (8)	Cameron Payne (8)	Fiserv Forum; 17,495	51–13
65	March 8	@ Orlando	W 102–99	Ayton, Shamet (21)	Deandre Ayton (19)	Cameron Payne (12)	Amway Center; 14,024	52–13
66	March 9	@ Miami	W 111–90	Devin Booker (23)	JaVale McGee (15)	Cameron Payne (10)	FTX Arena; 19,600	53–13
67	March 11	Toronto	L 112–117	Cameron Payne (24)	JaVale McGee (8)	Devin Booker (7)	Footprint Center; 17,071	53–14
68	March 13	L.A. Lakers	W 140–111	Devin Booker (30)	Deandre Ayton (16)	Cameron Payne (11)	Footprint Center; 17,071	54–14
69	March 15	@ New Orleans	W 131–115	Devin Booker (27)	Holiday, McGee (6)	Booker, Payne (8)	Smoothie King Center; 16,789	55–14
70	March 16	@ Houston	W 129–112	Devin Booker (36)	Torrey Craig (14)	Cameron Payne (11)	Toyota Center; 18,055	56–14
71	March 18	Chicago	W 129–102	Devin Booker (28)	Deandre Ayton (12)	Cameron Payne (7)	Footprint Center; 17,071	57–14
72	March 20	@ Sacramento	W 127–124 (OT)	Devin Booker (31)	Ayton, Craig (10)	Aaron Holiday (7)	Golden 1 Center; 17,583	58–14
73	March 23	@ Minnesota	W 125–116	Deandre Ayton (35)	Deandre Ayton (14)	Cameron Payne (9)	Target Center; 17,136	59–14
74	March 24	@ Denver	W 140–130	Devin Booker (49)	Deandre Ayton (7)	Chris Paul (13)	Ball Arena; 19,520	60–14
75	March 27	Philadelphia	W 114–104	Devin Booker (35)	Deandre Ayton (12)	Chris Paul (14)	Footprint Center; 17,071	61–14
76	March 30	@ Golden State	W 107–103	Booker, Bridges (22)	Deandre Ayton (16)	Chris Paul (8)	Chase Center; 18,064	62–14

April: 2–4 (home: 1–1; road: 1–3)

Game	Date	Team	Score	High points	High rebounds	High assists	Location Attendance	Record
77	April 1	@ Memphis	L 114–122	Devin Booker (41)	Ayton, McGee (12)	Chris Paul (11)	FedExForum; 17,794	62–15
78	April 3	@ Oklahoma City	L 96–117	Mikal Bridges (18)	Landry Shamet (7)	Chris Paul (9)	Paycom Center; 17,078	62–16
79	April 5	L.A. Lakers	W 121–110	Devin Booker (32)	Deandre Ayton (13)	Chris Paul (12)	Footprint Center; 17,071	63–16
80	April 6	@ L.A. Clippers	L 109–113	Ish Wainright (20)	Bismack Biyombo (12)	Aaron Holiday (7)	Staples Center; 19,068	63–17
81	April 8	@ Utah	W 111–105	Devin Booker (33)	Deandre Ayton (10)	Chris Paul (16)	Vivint Arena; 18,306	64–17
82	April 10	Sacramento	L 109–116	Landry Shamet (27)	JaVale McGee (13)	Holiday, Shamet, Lundberg (5)	Footprint Center; 17,071	64–18

2021–22 season schedule

== Standings ==
Pacific Division	W	L	PCT	GB	Home	Road	Div	GP
z – Phoenix Suns	64	18	.780	–	32‍–‍9	32‍–‍9	10–6	82
x – Golden State Warriors	53	29	.646	11.0	31‍–‍10	22‍–‍19	12–4	82
pi – Los Angeles Clippers	42	40	.512	22.0	25‍–‍16	17‍–‍24	9–7	82
Los Angeles Lakers	33	49	.402	31.0	21‍–‍20	12‍–‍29	3–13	82
Sacramento Kings	30	52	.366	34.0	16‍–‍25	14‍–‍27	6–10	82

Western Conference
#	Team	W	L	PCT	GB	GP
1	z – Phoenix Suns *	64	18	.780	–	82
2	y – Memphis Grizzlies *	56	26	.683	8.0	82
3	x – Golden State Warriors	53	29	.646	11.0	82
4	x – Dallas Mavericks	52	30	.634	12.0	82
5	y – Utah Jazz *	49	33	.598	15.0	82
6	x – Denver Nuggets	48	34	.585	16.0	82
7	x – Minnesota Timberwolves	46	36	.561	18.0	82
8	pi – Los Angeles Clippers	42	40	.512	22.0	82
9	x – New Orleans Pelicans	36	46	.439	28.0	82
10	pi − San Antonio Spurs	34	48	.415	30.0	82
11	Los Angeles Lakers	33	49	.402	31.0	82
12	Sacramento Kings	30	52	.366	34.0	82
13	Portland Trail Blazers	27	55	.329	37.0	82
14	Oklahoma City Thunder	24	58	.293	40.0	82
15	Houston Rockets	20	62	.244	44.0	82

== Playoffs ==
For the second straight year in a row, the Suns were in the NBA Playoffs after previously experiencing a decade-long drought from it that started back in the 2010–11 season. It is their first time they reached the Playoffs in back-to-back seasons since the Seven Seconds Or Less era from around the 2004–05 season until the 2007–08 season. The NBA also continued utilizing the play-in tournament set-up that first began in the 2020 NBA Bubble, with this season also being the second one in a row where the play-in tournament has the seventh and eighth best teams in each conference compete for the seventh seed in each conference and the ninth and tenth seeds compete for a shot at the eighth seed for each conference instead. However, this is the first full-length season that will feature the same play-in tournament experiment from the previous season at hand.

=== Game log ===
2022 playoff game log
Total: 7–6 (home: 5–2; road: 2–4)
First Round: 4–2 (home: 2–1; road: 2–1)

Game	Date	Team	Score	High points	High rebounds	High assists	Location Attendance	Series
1	April 17	New Orleans	W 110–99	Chris Paul (30)	Deandre Ayton (9)	Chris Paul (10)	Footprint Center; 17,071	1–0
2	April 19	New Orleans	L 114–125	Devin Booker (31)	Deandre Ayton (9)	Chris Paul (14)	Footprint Center; 17,071	1–1
3	April 22	@ New Orleans	W 114–111	Ayton, Paul (28)	Deandre Ayton (17)	Chris Paul (14)	Smoothie King Center; 18,962	2–1
4	April 24	@ New Orleans	L 103–118	Deandre Ayton (23)	Deandre Ayton (8)	Chris Paul (11)	Smoothie King Center; 18,962	2–2
5	April 26	New Orleans	W 112–97	Mikal Bridges (31)	Deandre Ayton (10)	Chris Paul (11)	Footprint Center; 17,071	3–2
6	April 28	@ New Orleans	W 115–109	Chris Paul (33)	Deandre Ayton (7)	Chris Paul (8)	Smoothie King Center; 18,710	4–2

Conference Semifinals: 3–4 (home: 3–1; road: 0–3)

Game	Date	Team	Score	High points	High rebounds	High assists	Location Attendance	Series
1	May 2	Dallas	W 121–114	Deandre Ayton (25)	Devin Booker (9)	Devin Booker (8)	Footprint Center; 17,071	1–0
2	May 4	Dallas	W 129–109	Devin Booker (30)	Jae Crowder (7)	Chris Paul (8)	Footprint Center; 17,071	2–0
3	May 6	@ Dallas	L 94–103	Jae Crowder (19)	Deandre Ayton (11)	Devin Booker (8)	American Airlines Center; 20,077	2–1
4	May 8	@ Dallas	L 101–111	Devin Booker (35)	Deandre Ayton (11)	Booker Paul (7)	American Airlines Center; 20,610	2–2
5	May 10	Dallas	W 110–80	Devin Booker (28)	Deandre Ayton (9)	Chris Paul (10)	Footprint Center; 17,071	3–2
6	May 12	@ Dallas	L 86–113	Deandre Ayton (21)	Deandre Ayton (11)	Mikal Bridges (5)	American Airlines Center; 20,777	3–3
7	May 15	Dallas	L 90–123	Cameron Johnson (12)	JaVale McGee (6)	Chris Paul (4)	Footprint Center; 17,071	3–4

2022 playoff schedule

== Awards and records ==
- From July 23-August 7, 2021, Devin Booker became the first Suns player to play for Team U.S.A. in an Olympiad setting since Shawn Marion and Amar'e Stoudemire in 2004. With the later agreed signing of center JaVale McGee on August 2 (which became official on August 17 after the branded 2020 Summer Olympics ended), Booker and McGee became the first Suns teammates (official or agreed upon) to play for Team U.S.A. since Marion and Stoudemire back in 2004 also.
  - With a 97–78 win over Australia on August 5 and an 87–82 win in their rematch against France, both Booker and McGee were named gold medalists for the branded 2020 Summer Olympics. They were not just the first medalists representing the Suns since Shawn Marion and Amar'e Stoudemire won their bronze medals in 2004, but they also became the first gold medalists while representing the Suns since Jason Kidd won a gold medal back in the year 2000.
- On August 18, 2021, Jalen Smith was named a member of the All-Summer League First Team by averaging 16.3 points and a Las Vegas Summer League leading 12.5 rebounds in the four games he played for the Suns, with all four performances resulting in double-doubles for each game.
- On September 11, 2021, former Suns head coach Cotton Fitzsimmons was posthumously inducted into the Naismith Basketball Hall of Fame as a contributor to the game of basketball.
- Both former Suns players Charles Barkley and Steve Nash were named members of the NBA 75th Anniversary Team on October 19, 2021.
  - A day later, Chris Paul joined Barkley and Nash as the only other Suns players at that point in time to join the NBA 75th Anniversary Team, as well as was the only current Suns player to join that team. A day after that, Jason Kidd joined Paul, Nash, and Barkley as the few Suns players, former or current, to join the NBA 75.
- On November 2, 2021, former Suns player and coach Paul Westphal and current Suns broadcaster Ann Meyers Drysdale were both inducted into the Arizona Sports Hall of Fame for their sporting contributions to the state of Arizona.

=== All-Star ===
- Chris Paul – 12th All-Star Game
- Devin Booker – third All-Star Game
- Monty Williams – first NBA All-Star Game head coach

=== Records ===
- On October 22, 2021, the team's second game of the season, Chris Paul became the 47th player in NBA history to reach 20,000 points for their career. Not only that, but he became the first player in league history to ever get to both 20,000+ points and 10,000+ assists in a career, getting his first eight points off of free-throws alone. Paul finished up the night with a double-double of 23 points and 14 assists in a 115–105 win over the Los Angeles Lakers.
- On November 2, Chris Paul overtook both Mark Jackson and Steve Nash respectively to become the new third-highest assist creator of all-time, surpassing both former players in the second quarter of that game. Paul finished the night with another double-double performance, this time recording 14 points and 18 assists, in a 112–100 win at home over his first team, the New Orleans Pelicans.

=== Milestones ===
- On October 30, 2021, Chris Paul tied Antawn Jamison as the 46th highest all-time scorer in NBA history with 16 points scored alongside 10 assists recorded in a 101–92 win over the Cleveland Cavaliers.
  - Two days later, on November 2, Paul overtook not just Jamison, but also former Suns player Tom Chambers' position to become the 45th highest all-time scorer in NBA history. He also overtook both Mark Jackson and former Suns player Steve Nash's positions for the all-time assist leaders to become the new third highest assist creator in league history behind only former Suns player Jason Kidd and John Stockton, finishing the night with a double-double of 14 points and 18 assists in a 112–100 win over the New Orleans Pelicans.

=== Team milestones ===
- On October 30, 2021, Devin Booker overtook Phoenix Suns Ring of Honor member (and former assistant coach) Dan Majerle to become the second-greatest three-point shooter in franchise history, making two three-pointers to also break through the 800 made three-point shots barrier in a blowout loss to the Portland Trail Blazers.
- On November 6, Devin Booker overtook Phoenix Suns Ring of Honor member (and former head coach) Paul Westphal to become the team's newest eighth highest scorer in franchise history. He finished the night off with a current season-high of 38 points in a 121–117 win over the Atlanta Hawks.
  - He also tied Amar'e Stoudemire for overall field goal attempts with the team by attempting 21 shots that night, tying Stoudemire at eighth for most field goal attempts in franchise history. Booker later surpassed him two days later on November 8 against the Sacramento Kings, while also being the 12th player in franchise history to break the 14,000 minutes played barrier with the Suns.

== Injuries/Personal missed games ==
Player	Duration		Reason(s) for missed time	Games missed
Player	Start	End	Reason(s) for missed time	Games missed
Dario Šarić	July 6, 2021	Unknown	Tore the ACL in his right knee during Game 1 of the 2021 NBA Finals.	??
Cameron Payne	October 23, 2021	November 6, 2021	Right hamstring strain during the road Lakers game.	5
Deandre Ayton	November 2, 2021	November 4, 2021	Right leg contusion during the home Cavaliers game.	1
Deandre Ayton	November 6, 2021	Unknown	Lower right leg bruise during the home Rockets game.	?

== Player statistics ==
Legend
GP	Games played	GS	Games started	MPG	Minutes per game
FG%	Field-goal percentage	3P%	3-point field-goal percentage	FT%	Free-throw percentage
RPG	Rebounds per game	APG	Assists per game	SPG	Steals per game
BPG	Blocks per game	PPG	Points per game

=== Regular season ===
Phoenix Suns statistics
Player	GP	GS	MPG	FG%	3P%	FT%	RPG	APG	SPG	BPG	PPG
Mikal Bridges	82	82	34.8	.534	.369	.834	4.2	2.3	1.2	.4	14.2
JaVale McGee	74	17	15.8	.629	.222	.699	6.7	.6	.3	1.1	9.2
Landry Shamet	69	14	20.8	.394	.368	.840	1.8	1.6	.4	.1	8.3
Devin Booker	68	68	34.5	.466	.383	.868	5.0	4.8	1.1	.4	26.8
Jae Crowder	67	67	28.1	.399	.348	.789	5.3	1.9	1.4	.4	9.4
Cameron Johnson	66	16	26.2	.460	.425	.860	4.1	1.5	.9	.2	12.5
Chris Paul	65	65	32.9	.493	.317	.837	4.4	10.8	1.9	.3	14.7
Deandre Ayton	58	58	29.5	.634	.368	.746	10.2	1.4	.7	.7	17.2
Cameron Payne	58	12	22.0	.409	.336	.843	3.0	4.9	.7	.3	10.8
Elfrid Payton	50	1	11.0	.383	.222	.375	1.8	2.0	.5	.1	3.0
Ish Wainright	45	0	8.0	.394	.322	.583	1.2	.3	.4	.1	2.4
Bismack Biyombo	36	3	14.1	.593		.535	4.6	.6	.3	.7	5.8
Jalen Smith^{†}	29	4	13.2	.460	.231	.769	4.8	.2	.2	.6	6.0
Torrey Craig^{†}	27	2	20.8	.450	.323	.706	4.3	1.2	.8	.6	6.9
Aaron Holiday^{†}	22	1	16.3	.411	.444	.939	2.5	3.4	.8	.0	6.8
Abdel Nader	14	0	10.4	.343	.286	.600	1.9	.5	.6	.3	2.4
Frank Kaminsky	9	0	20.1	.545	.333	.900	4.6	1.4	.9	.8	10.6
Justin Jackson^{†}	6	0	5.8	.357	.333		1.2	.3	.0	.0	2.2
Chandler Hutchison	6	0	3.7	.500		1.000	.8	.3	.0	.0	.7
Gabriel Lundberg	4	0	11.0	.263	.375		1.8	2.8	.8	.0	3.3
Emanuel Terry	3	0	6.0	.000			5.0	.7	.3	.0	.0
M. J. Walker	2	0	4.0	.000	.000		.5	.5	1.0	.0	.0
Paris Bass	2	0	3.5	.333	.000	1.000	2.0	.0	.5	.0	3.0

=== Playoffs ===
Phoenix Suns statistics
Player	GP	GS	MPG	FG%	3P%	FT%	RPG	APG	SPG	BPG	PPG
Mikal Bridges	13	13	38.5	.478	.394	.933	4.7	2.8	1.1	1.0	13.3
Chris Paul	13	13	34.5	.561	.388	.946	4.2	8.3	1.5	.2	17.5
Deandre Ayton	13	13	30.5	.640	.500	.636	8.9	1.7	.4	.8	17.9
Jae Crowder	13	13	29.5	.400	.302	.731	4.7	2.4	1.0	.5	9.4
Cameron Johnson	13	3	24.6	.465	.373	.813	3.5	1.5	.4	.1	10.8
Cameron Payne	13	0	13.2	.297	.167	.833	1.5	2.1	.5	.1	4.2
Landry Shamet	12	0	16.0	.396	.346	.714	1.7	1.3	.5	.0	4.3
JaVale McGee	12	0	11.1	.700	.000	.846	4.0	.6	.3	.4	6.8
Devin Booker	10	10	36.6	.451	.431	.887	4.8	4.4	.5	.4	23.3
Bismack Biyombo	9	0	9.6	.647		.500	2.1	.6	.1	.2	2.8
Torrey Craig	9	0	7.7	.364	.300	.500	1.7	.6	.4	.2	2.2
Ish Wainright	7	0	3.7	.417	.500		1.6	.1	.1	.1	1.9
Aaron Holiday	6	0	3.3	.571	.714	.000	.5	1.5	.5	.2	3.5
Elfrid Payton	2	0	4.0	.667			.0	1.5	.0	.0	2.0

- ^{†} Denotes player spent time with another team in the season. Stats reflect time with the Suns only.

== Transactions ==
=== Trades ===
July 29, 2021	To Phoenix Suns Landry Shamet	To Brooklyn Nets Jevon Carter; Draft rights to #29 pick Day'Ron Sharpe
February 10, 2022	To Phoenix Suns Torrey Craig; Cash Considerations	To Indiana Pacers Jalen Smith; 2022 second-round pick
February 10, 2022	To Phoenix Suns Aaron Holiday	To Washington Wizards Cash Considerations

=== Free agents ===
==== Re-Signed ====
Player	Signed	Date
Chris Paul	Signed 4-year partially guaranteed deal worth $120 Million	August 6, 2021
Cameron Payne	Signed 3-year partially guaranteed deal worth $19 Million	August 6, 2021
Abdel Nader	Signed 2-year partially guaranteed deal worth $4,200,000 (Officially gained only $2,000,000 through this season.)	August 6, 2021
Frank Kaminsky III	Signed 1-year deal worth $2,239,544	August 9, 2021
Mikal Bridges	Signed 4-year contract extension worth $90 Million	October 17, 2021
Landry Shamet	Signed 4-year partially guaranteed contract extension worth $43 Million	October 18, 2021

a: Despite the length of the deal, only the first two years of Chris Paul's deal fully guarantee him up to $60 million total. However, his third season in that deal is only partially guaranteed for him, while his fourth and final season includes a team option that is not guaranteed for Paul.
b: For Cameron Payne's third and final year, he is only guaranteed $2,000,000 out of the $6,500,000 he could receive that season.
c: Abdel Nader's second year had a team option on whether he'd be back by then on that same deal (which would have had a value of $2,200,000 in that season) or not. However, Nader would not make it to the end of his first season back with the Suns due to the same serious injuries that affected his long-term performance last season coming back to harm him this season. This combined with the Suns reacquiring Torrey Craig via trade led to Nader being waived from the team on February 10, 2022.
d: For Landry Shamet's final year of his contract, that year is not fully guaranteed for him.

==== Additions ====
Player	Signed	Former team(s)
Elfrid Payton	Signed 1-year deal worth $2,389,641	New York Knicks
JaVale McGee	Signed 1-year deal worth $5 Million	Denver Nuggets
Chandler Hutchison	Signed a two-way contract worth $462,629	San Antonio Spurs / Washington Wizards
Ishmail Wainright	Signed a two-way contract worth $462,629	(France) SIG Strasbourg / (Canada) Toronto Raptors
Emanuel Terry	Signed a 10-day contract under COVID-19 hardship rules	Stockton Kings
M.J. Walker	Signed a 10-day contract under COVID-19 hardship rules	Westchester Knicks
Paris Bass	Signed two 10-day contracts under COVID-19 hardship rules	South Bay Lakers
Bismack Biyombo	Signed 10-day / 1-year contract worth $1,366,392	Charlotte Hornets
Justin Jackson	Signed two 10-day contracts under COVID-19/injury hardship rules worth $205,662	Boston Celtics / Texas Legends
Gabriel Lundberg	Signed two-way contract worth $462,629	(Russia) PBC CSKA Moscow

e: As of the 2020–21 season, two-way contracts now have their salaries at six-digit figures instead of the initially planned five-digit salaries planned back when two-way contracts were first created for the NBA. That means instead of earning what would have been $84,414 for only 45 days in the NBA (excluding the early and later parts of the regular season, regardless of whether they played or not) this season, two-way contracts like Chandler Hutchison and Ishmail Wainright can now earn half of this season's rookie scaled minimum contract (which is $462,629 for this season) while being eligible to play for the entire regular season (but not the NBA Playoffs this season). Players like Hutchison and Wainright are also eligible to play for the 2021–22 NBA G League season for the affiliate team they've signed up for. However, since the Suns officially joined the Portland Trail Blazers as the only team without an NBA G League affiliate team as of this season, any team that isn't the NBA G League Ignite will be eligible for Hutchison and Wainright to join up with for the NBA G League this season, so long as the Suns themselves agree to the team(s) they join up with for this season. Hutchison later played for the Santa Cruz Warriors, affiliate of the Golden State Warriors, during the regular season, while Wainright has ultimately stayed with Phoenix throughout the entirety of his two-way contract.
f: Chandler Hutchison was originally last a part of the San Antonio Spurs from August 6 to September 4, 2021 as a part of a very rare five-team trade that also featured the Washington Wizards, Indiana Pacers, Brooklyn Nets, and Los Angeles Lakers. However, he last played for the Washington Wizards as a part of the squad that made it to the 2021 NBA Playoffs after once being considered the worst Eastern Conference team earlier in the season. Even so, because his final year on his previous contract was fully guaranteed due to him being a first-round draft pick back in 2018, he will still receive the full $4,019,459 he was originally going to receive from San Antonio in addition to the two-way contract salary Hutchison is going to get in Phoenix.
g: Ishmail Wainright previously last officially played for the SIG Strasbourg in France's LNB Pro A league before signing a two-year non-guaranteed deal with the Toronto Raptors on August 7, 2021, though he was later waived by the end of the preseason on October 17. Wainright was then given a two-way contract with the Suns five days later on October 22, giving him a guaranteed shot to play in the NBA for the first time ever with Phoenix, which ended up occurring a month later in November during their 18-game winning streak.
h: From December 20, 2021 until January 17, 2022, the NBA implemented temporary updates to their hardship exception rules to accommodate the number of players being infected by COVID-19 and its other variants during the winter months of the season. Players signed under those rules in that time received money from their 10-day contracts like they normally would, but they did not count toward each team's salary cap space in that period of time. For the Suns, the update resulted in the necessity of re-signing Emanuel Terry onto the team again on December 27, 2021 after he previously played for Phoenix in the 2018–19 season, as well as using additional 10-day contract signings for M.J. Walker and Paris Bass on December 30, 2021 following the announcements of Elfrid Payton (who later tested negative the following day after being announced as a positive test on December 26, 2021, only to confirm that he did have it after all on December 29, 2021), Jae Crowder, Deandre Ayton, JaVale McGee, and Abdel Nader all being infected with the virus near the end of December 2021. The Suns then signed former Charlotte Hornets center Bismack Biyombo at the start of January 2022, with Biyombo eventually being more of a long-term stay for the team by comparison to the other 10-day contracts signed in that time. Finally, the Suns signed 2021 NBA Finals champion Justin Jackson to his 10-day hardship exception contract on January 4, 2022 after it was confirmed that Landry Shamet got infected for it on that day.
i: Paris Bass earned himself a second 10-day contract with the Suns on January 12, 2022 due to him being the best performing 10-day contract on the team by the end of 2021 and the start of 2022 (outside of veteran players Bismack Biyombo and Justin Jackson) while also having a shot to potentially earn a two-way contract to replace Chandler Hutchison. Bass signed his second 10-day contract on January 15 due to not only Ishmail Wainright getting COVID-19, but concerns of Chris Paul being infected with COVID-19 once again before ultimately replacing Justin Jackson's position from the team in that period of time.
j: Bismack Biyombo later signed a one-year deal worth his veteran's minimum salary of $1,366,392 on January 11, 2022 after showcasing very positive results in his first two games played with Phoenix under his 10-day COVID-19 hardship exception contract.
k: Justin Jackson originally signed his first 10-day contract with the Suns in January 2022 due to a good number of players being infected with COVID-19 at the time. While Jackson and the rest of the players that signed 10-day contracts got properly compensated for their time spent with the team, they did not come off of their salary cap due to the COVID-19 hardship exception rules implemented at the time. However, he later received a second 10-day contract with Phoenix in February 2022 due to the Suns dealing with many injuries at the time instead, which means that contract would come out of the team's salary cap for a bit this season. As such, his final salary received combines the salaries of his 10-day COVID-19 exception contract with his 10-day injury exception contract.
l: Justin Jackson originally last officially played for the Texas Legends during this season before he signed a 10-day COVID-19 hardship contract exception with the Boston Celtics on December 18, 2021. Once there, he played in only one game with two minutes of playing time for Boston before being one of four Celtics players to be hit with COVID-19 himself on Christmas Eve that year. However, Jackson would recover in time to sign a 10-day COVID-19 hardship exception with Phoenix by January 4, 2022 after previously returning to Texas with the Legends on December 29, 2021. Jackson then returned to the Texas Legends after his first 10-day contract expired before re-signing with the Suns in February 2022 with a second 10-day contract (this time fulfilling a hardship exception instead due to Cameron Payne (and Landry Shamet) being out alongside long-term injuries to Dario Šarić, Frank Kaminsky III, and Abdel Nader earlier on).
m: Originally, Gabriel Lundberg signed with the Suns on March 12, 2022 during the time the Russian invasion of Ukraine first began, which led to an early suspension for the PBC CSKA Moscow in the Euroleague and a brief suspension of Russian play. However, visa issues from getting out of Russia and then going from his home nation of Denmark to entering the United States of America resulted in him officially joining the Phoenix Suns on April 3, near the end of the regular season.

==== Subtractions ====
Player	Reason left	New team(s)
Jevon Carter	Traded	Brooklyn Nets / Milwaukee Bucks
Torrey Craig	Unrestricted free agent	Indiana Pacers / Phoenix Suns
Ty-Shon Alexander	Waived two-way contract	(Italy) Segafredo Virtus Bologna / (Italy) Allianz Pallacanestro Trieste
E'Twaun Moore	Unrestricted free agent	Orlando Magic
Langston Galloway	Unrestricted free agent	Golden State Warriors / College Park Skyhawks / Brooklyn Nets / Milwaukee Bucks
Chandler Hutchison	Waived two-way contract	Sioux Falls Skyforce
Emanuel Terry	Waived 10-day COVID-19 hardship contract exception	Stockton Kings / (France) Orléans Loiret Basket
M.J. Walker	10-day COVID-19 hardship exception contract expired	Westchester Knicks
Paris Bass	Two 10-day COVID-19 hardship exception contracts expired	Phoenix Suns / South Bay Lakers
Justin Jackson	Two 10-day COVID-19/injury hardship exception contracts expired	Texas Legends / Phoenix Suns
Jalen Smith	Traded	Indiana Pacers
Abdel Nader	Waived	(Australia) South East Melbourne Phoenix
Frank Kaminsky III	Waived	Atlanta Hawks

m: Originally, Jevon Carter was traded to the Brooklyn Nets as a part of an agreed upon deal during the 2021 NBA draft. However, Carter was waived later on in the season on February 20, 2022 in relation to the Nets acquiring former Suns point guard Goran Dragić. Carter was then acquired by the defending champion Milwaukee Bucks two days later.
n: Originally, Torrey Craig left the Phoenix Suns at the start of the 2021 free agency period in order to sign a guaranteed two-year deal worth $10 million with the Indiana Pacers that he would not have gotten with Phoenix at the time. However, by the February 10, 2022 trade deadline, the Pacers no longer viewed themselves as one of the more competitive teams in the Eastern Conference for this season, while the Suns saw themselves having enough room to take on Craig's new contract properly. As such, the Suns and Pacers agreed to a deal that saw Torrey Craig return to Phoenix in exchange for Jalen Smith (and his expiring rookie scale contract) and the Suns' 2022 second-round pick on that day.
o: Ty-Shon Alexander originally signed a two-year deal with the Segafredo Virtus Bologna of Italy's Lega Basket Serie A on September 7, 2021 after previously being waived by the Suns on August 27. However, he and the team agreed to waive that deal on February 15, 2022, with Alexander deciding to play for the Allianz Pallacanestro Trieste under a new contract later that same day.
p: Langston Galloway originally signed with the Golden State Warriors on September 24, 2021. However, he was waived from the team on October 9, failing to join them officially during the preseason period. Galloway then agreed to play for the College Park Skyhawks in the NBA G League for one game on December 14, 2021 before signing a 10-day hardship exception contract (relating to COVID-19 infections) with the Brooklyn Nets two days later. Galloway then signed a second 10-day contract with Brooklyn Nets on December 26, 2021 before the Nets decided not to sign him up for the rest of the season. Galloway then received a 10-day contract with the defending champion Milwaukee Bucks on January 7, 2022 before ultimately returning to College Park on January 21, 2022 after his 10-day contract expired there. Galloway also took part in Team U.S.A.'s qualification rounds for the 2023 FIBA Basketball World Cup in the month of February.
q: Emanuel Terry previously signed a 10-day contract with the Suns on December 27, 2021 as one of the first players to sign with the Suns through a temporary COVID-19 hardship exception. However, Terry would not get to see his contract all the way through the initially planned 10 days, as his 10-day contract got waived on January 4, 2022 alongside Chandler Hutchison's two-way contract in order for Phoenix to sign Justin Jackson to the team under what became their last new player to sign a 10-day hardship exception through means of COVID-19 infections by early January 2022.
r: After being waived by the Suns, Emanuel Terry originally returned to the Stockton Kings of the NBA G League on January 4, 2022 for the rest of the G League's season. However, on April 9, near the end of this season, Terry signed a deal with the Orléans Loiret Basket in France's LNB Pro A for the rest of their current season.
s: When Paris Bass' first 10-day contract expired on January 12, 2022, he waited for three days to sign his second 10-day hardship exception with the Suns. However, Bass did not play in his second contract with the Suns, thus leading to an early leave for him in order to return to the South Bay Lakers in the NBA G League.
t: Justin Jackson originally signed a 10-day contract on January 4, 2022 before it expired naturally 10 days later. However, due to constant injuries affecting the team throughout that month, the Suns signed Jackson again, this time under a 10-day injury exception contract, on February 1, 2022. The second 10-day contract, however, expired a day earlier than expected on February 10 due to their results in the trade deadline. The addition of Aaron Holiday combined with the return of Torrey Craig resulted in them releasing Jackson early and waiving Abdel Nader early in the season as well.
u: When Justin Jackson's first 10-day contract expired on January 14, 2022, he originally returned to play with the Texas Legends in the NBA G League once again. However, he later returned to the Suns on February 1, 2022 for a second 10-day contract with the team after leaving a positive enough impression the first time around for an injury reserve exception. Once that contract was up, however, Jackson returned to the Texas Legends for the rest of this season on
v: Due to Abdel Nader's injury, he did not sign with a new team this season. In fact, it wouldn't be until December 12, 2023, when Nadel finally signed up with a new team elsewhere in the world. In this case, he signed with the South East Melbourne Phoenix in the National Basketball League in Australia.
w: Due to Frank Kaminsky's injury, he did not sign with a new team this season. However, he did sign with the Atlanta Hawks on July 12, 2022.
