= Paris Bass =

American-Libyan basketball player (born 1995)

No. 35 – Suwon KT Sonicboom
- Position: Power forward
- League: KBL

Personal information
- Born: August 29, 1995 (age 31) Detroit, Michigan, U.S.
- Listed height: 6 ft 9 in (2.06 m)
- Listed weight: 200 lb (91 kg)

Career information
- High school: Seaholm (Birmingham, Michigan)
- College: Detroit Mercy (2014–2016)
- NBA draft: 2017: undrafted
- Playing career: 2017–present

Career history
- 2017: Erie BayHawks
- 2018: El Million Yireh
- 2018: Titanes del Licey
- 2018: Jose Horacio Rodriguez
- 2018: Kinmen Kaoliang Liquor
- 2019: CDP Domingo Paulino Santiago
- 2019: Club Rafael Barias
- 2019: Jose Horacio Rodriguez
- 2019: Indios de San Francisco de Macorís
- 2020: CDP Domingo Paulino Santiago
- 2020: Atléticos de San Germán
- 2020: Cimarrones del Choco
- 2021: CDP Domingo Paulino Santiago
- 2021: Club Rafael Barias
- 2021: Atléticos de San Germán
- 2021–2022: South Bay Lakers
- 2021–2022: Phoenix Suns
- 2022–2023: Salt Lake City Stars
- 2023: Wisconsin Herd
- 2023: Capitanes de Arecibo
- 2023–2024: Suwon KT Sonicboom
- 2024–2025: Zhejiang Golden Bulls
- 2025: Leones de Ponce
- 2025–2026: Sagesse SC
- 2026–present: Suwon KT Sonicboom

Career highlights
- BSN Most Valuable Player (2020); BSN Second Team (2023); BSN Best Five (2020); LNB champion (2019); TBS champion (2019); Dominican LNB Most Valuable Player (2019); Dominican LNB Finals MVP (2019); 2× BSN top scorer (2020–21, 2021–22); First-team All-Horizon League (2016); Horizon League Freshman of the Year (2015); Horizon League All-Freshman Team (2015)
- Stats at NBA.com
- Stats at Basketball Reference

Paris Nickolas Bass (born August 29, 1995), also known as Basem Albebas, is an American-Libyan professional basketball player for the Suwon KT Sonicboom of the Korean Basketball League (KBL). He played college basketball for the Detroit Mercy Titans.

== High school career ==
Bass attended Seaholm High School in Birmingham, Michigan. As a senior, he averaged 23.4 points and 12.4 rebounds per game. Bass earned Basketball Coaches Association of Michigan (BCAM) All-State Team and the Detroit News All-Metro North First Team honors. Regarded as a three-star recruit by Rivals.com, Bass committed to play college basketball at Detroit Mercy.

== College career ==
Bass redshirted his true freshman season. As a redshirt freshman, he averaged 12.4 points, 5.7 rebounds and 1.9 assists per game. Bass was named Horizon League Freshman of the Year. He missed the first eight games of his sophomore season with a suspension. Bass averaged 18.4 points, 8 rebounds and 2.1 assists per game as a sophomore, earning First-team All-Horizon League honors.On May 10, 2016, Bass was removed from the Detroit Mercy program.

== Professional career ==
=== Austria and NBA D-League (2016–2017) ===
On July 27, 2016, Bass signed his first professional contract with the Traiskirchen Lions of the Austrian Basketball Bundesliga. He did not make his debut for Traiskirchen. In February 2017, Bass signed with the Erie BayHawks of the NBA D-League. In 15 games, he averaged 3.9 points and 2.7 rebounds per game.

=== Dominican Republic, Taiwan, Puerto Rico, and Colombia (2018–2021) ===
In 2018, Bass played for three teams in the Dominican Republic: El Million Yireh of the TBS, Titanes del Licey of the LNB, and Jose Horacio Rodriguez of the Superior Basketball Tournament of Espaillat (BSE).

Between November 17 and December 15, 2018, Bass played for Kinmen Kaoliang Liquor of the Taiwanese Super Basketball League.

In 2019, Bass played for four teams in the Dominican Republic: CDP Domingo Paulino Santiago of the Santiago League, Club Rafael Barias of the TBS, Jose Horacio Rodriguez of the BSE, and Indios de San Francisco de Macorís of the LNB. With Indios de San Francisco, he helped the team win the championship and was named MVP of the tournament and of the Final Series.

In January 2020, Bass re-joined CDP Domingo Paulino Santiago of the Santiago League and averaged 23.5 points, 12.2 rebounds, 3.0 assists and 1.3 steals per game. Bass joined the Atléticos de San Germán of the Puerto Rican Baloncesto Superior Nacional on March 5, 2020. In his first season with the team, he averaged 22.1 points and 10.6 rebounds per game. On September 24, 2020, Bass signed with Cimarrones del Choco of the Baloncesto Profesional Colombiano.

In March 2021, Bass re-joined CDP Domingo Paulino Santiago for a third stint. He also had a second stint with Club Rafael Barias between May 5 and June 1, 2021. He re-joined the Atléticos de San Germán in July 2021 and averaged 22.7 points per game during the season.

=== South Bay Lakers / Phoenix Suns (2021–2022) ===
In October 2021, Bass joined the South Bay Lakers of the NBA G League after a successful tryout. He was named to the NBA G League All-Showcase Team.

On December 31, 2021, Bass signed a 10-day contract with the Phoenix Suns via the hardship exemption. He signed a second 10-day contract with the Suns on January 12.

On January 22, 2022, Bass was reacquired by the South Bay Lakers.

Bass joined the Los Angeles Lakers' 2022 NBA Summer League roster. In his Lakers Summer League debut, Bass scored fifteen points, six rebounds, and three blocks in a 100–66 win against the Miami Heat.

=== Salt Lake City Stars (2022–2023) ===
On September 14, 2022, Bass signed with the Utah Jazz, but was waived 2 days later. On October 23, 2022, Bass joined the Salt Lake City Stars training camp roster. On January 1, 2023, he was waived.

=== Wisconsin Herd (2023) ===
On January 6, 2023, Bass was acquired by the Wisconsin Herd. On February 11, 2023, he set the Herd record for highest number of points scored in a single game with 50 points.

=== Capitanes de Arecibo (2023) ===
On March 28, 2023, Bass signed with Capitanes de Arecibo of the Puerto Rican league.

On June 5, 2024, Bass signed with Al Ahli Tripoli.

=== Zhejiang Golden Bulls (2024–2025) ===
On July 4, 2024, Bass signed with Zhejiang Golden Bulls of the Chinese Basketball Association (CBA).

=== Leones de Ponce (2025) ===
On February 14, 2025, Bass signed with Leones de Ponce of the Baloncesto Superior Nacional (BSN).

== Career statistics ==
Legend
GP	Games played	GS	Games started	MPG	Minutes per game
FG%	Field goal percentage	3P%	3-point field goal percentage	FT%	Free throw percentage
RPG	Rebounds per game	APG	Assists per game	SPG	Steals per game
BPG	Blocks per game	PPG	Points per game	**Bold**	Career high

=== NBA ===
Year	Team	GP	GS	MPG	FG%	3P%	FT%	RPG	APG	SPG	BPG	PPG
2021–22	Phoenix	2	0	3.5	.333	.000	1.000	2.0	.0	.5	.0	3.0
Career		2	0	3.5	.333	.000	1.000	2.0	.0	.5	.0	3.0
