= Ish Wainright =

American-Ugandan basketball player (born 1994)

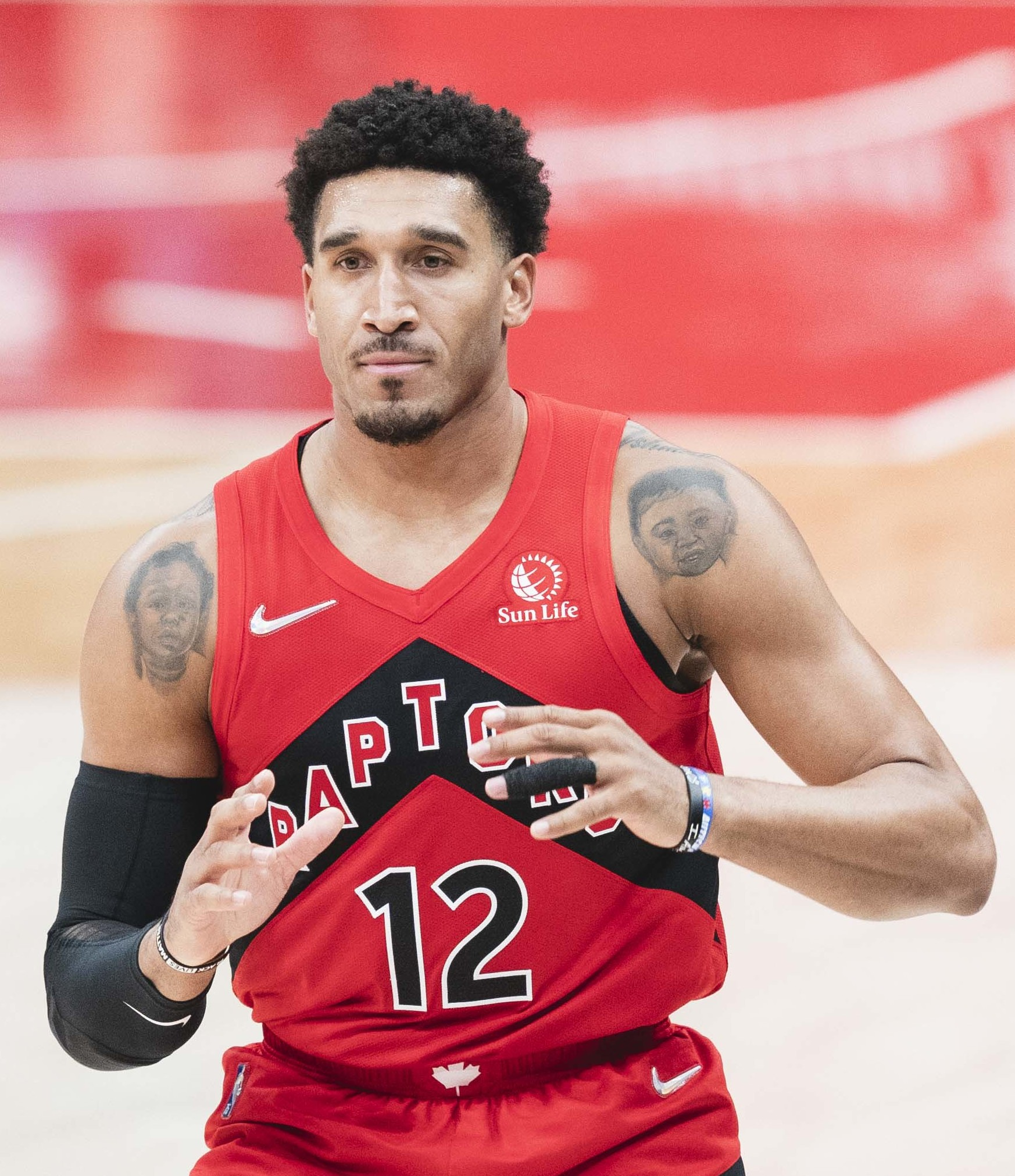
- Wainright with the Toronto Raptors in the 2021 preseason

No. 12 – Hapoel Tel Aviv
- Position: Small forward / power forward
- League: Israeli Basketball Premier League; EuroLeague

Personal information
- Born: September 12, 1994 (age 32) Kansas City, Missouri, U.S.
- Listed height: 6 ft 5 in (1.96 m)
- Listed weight: 250 lb (113 kg)

Career information
- High school: Raytown South (Raytown, Missouri); Montrose Christian School (Rockville, Maryland)
- College: Baylor (2013–2017)
- NBA draft: 2017: undrafted
- Playing career: 2018–present

Career history
- 2018–2019: Nürnberg Falcons
- 2019–2020: Rasta Vechta
- 2020–2021: SIG Strasbourg
- 2021–2023: Phoenix Suns
- 2023–2024: Portland Trail Blazers
- 2023: →Rip City Remix
- 2024: Phoenix Suns
- 2024–present: Hapoel Tel Aviv

Career highlights
- EuroCup champion (2025); Big 12 All-Defensive Team (2017)
- Stats at NBA.com
- Stats at Basketball Reference

Ishmail Carzell Wainright (born September 12, 1994) is an American-born Ugandan professional basketball player for Hapoel Tel Aviv of the Israeli Basketball Premier League and the EuroLeague. He also represents the senior Ugandan national team.

He played college basketball for the Baylor Bears, with whom he was named to the Big 12 All-Defensive Team in 2017. He also played football for the school as a tight end. He has played in the NBA for the Phoenix Suns and the Portland Trail Blazers. Wainright is the grandson of former NBA player Maurice King.

== High school career ==
Wainright played two seasons for head coach Stu Vetter at Montrose Christian School in Rockville, Maryland, helping the team to 19–5 record as senior in 2012–13. He earned 2013 All-MET honors after averaging 8.8 points, 9.1 rebounds, and 8.2 assists for Mustangs.

He began his prep career at Raytown South High School in suburban Kansas City, where Wainright averaged 13.6 points and 9.8 rebounds as a sophomore in 2010–11. A consensus top-75 recruit, he was ranked No. 28 in 2013 class by ESPN.com, No. 51 by Scout.com, No. 52 by Rivals.com, and No. 62 by 247Sports.com.

== College career ==
Wainright played four seasons of basketball for the Baylor Bears, from 2013-17. He averaged 24.7 minutes, 5.9 points, 4.3 rebounds, 2.6 assists, and 1.0 steals per game over 34 games as a junior.

As a senior, Wainright averaged 29.4 minutes, 5.5 points, 5.1 rebounds, 3.2 assists, and 1.7 steals (8th in the conference) per game over 35 games. He was named to the Big 12 All-Defensive Team.

He played one season of football for Baylor after his college basketball career and staying at the school for a fifth year, playing tight end. Wainright had four catches for 34 yards and two touchdowns in nine games.

After finishing his career at Baylor, Wainright joined the Buffalo Bills of the NFL as an undrafted free agent. He did not make the final roster.

== Professional career ==
=== Nürnberg Falcons (2018–2019) ===
Wainright returned to basketball and signed with Nürnberg Falcons BC on September 3, 2018. He played in 39 games and averaged 28.4 minutes, 12.1 points, 7.5 rebounds (4th in the German Pro A league), 2.8 assists, and 1.7 steals (2nd) per game, while shooting 56.2% from the field.

=== Rasta Vechta (2019–2020) ===
On July 2, 2019, Wainright signed with Rasta Vechta. Wainright played in 40 games and averaged 29.0 minutes, 10.5 points, 5.8 rebounds, 2.9 assists, and 1.8 steals (2nd in the German BBL) per game.

=== SIG Strasbourg (2020–2021) ===
On June 17, 2020, Wainright signed with SIG Strasbourg. He averaged 27.9 minutes, 11.3 points, 4.5 rebounds, 2.4 assists, and 1.6 steals (5th in the French Jeep Elite) per game, while shooting 49.2% from the field.

=== Phoenix Suns (2021–2023) ===
On August 7, 2021, Wainright signed a two-year, non-guaranteed deal with the Toronto Raptors. He was waived by the Raptors on October 17.

Five days later, he signed a two-way contract with the Phoenix Suns. Wainright made his NBA debut on November 19 near the end of a win against the Dallas Mavericks, with him recording his first points, rebounds, and assist two days later in a blowout win over the Denver Nuggets. On January 30, 2022, Wainright scored a then-season-high 10 points and put up two blocks in 20 minutes of action (including the entirety of the fourth quarter) in a 115–110 win over the San Antonio Spurs. On April 6, he surpassed his season bests with career highs of 20 points and 8 rebounds in a close loss to the Los Angeles Clippers. On April 10, the Suns converted his deal into a standard contract. In 2021-22 for Phoenix, in 45 games he averaged 8.0 minutes, 2.4 points, and 1.2 rebounds per game

Wainright joined the Suns' 2022 NBA Summer League roster. On August 4, 2022, Wainright signed a two-way contract with the Suns. After dealing with lower back pain and then the death of his father, pastor Calvin Wainright, Ishmail Wainright returned to action with the Suns on November 16, hitting a three-pointer in a 130–119 win over the defending champion Golden State Warriors.

On February 24, 2023, Wainright signed a two-year, $2.5 million deal with the Suns, including a team option for the 2023–24 season. Wainright previously operated under a two-way contract and was nearing the 50-game limit. On March 5 against the Dallas Mavericks, coach Monty Williams made a decision late in the third quarter to substitute starter Josh Okogie, who had missed all of his eight three-point attempts, with Wainright. Although he had not played in the game up until that point, Wainright made a significant impact, hitting four of his five three-point attempts, helping the Suns secure a 130–126 victory. In 2022-23 for Phoenix, in 60 games he averaged 15.3 minutes, 4.2 points, and 2.3 rebounds per game, while shooting 83.9% from the free throw line.

On October 19, 2023, Wainright was waived shortly before the 2023–24 season.

=== Portland Trail Blazers (2023–2024) ===
On October 21, 2023, Wainright was claimed off waivers by the Portland Trail Blazers. Playing three games for its G League team, the Rip City Remix, he averaged 23.3 minutes, 10.3 points, 3.7 rebounds, and 1.3 assists per game.

Wainright made his debut with the Trail Blazers on November 14 in a loss to the Utah Jazz during the 2023 NBA In-Season Tournament. On January 6, 2024, after playing seven games with the team in which he averaged 6.6 minutes, 2.9 points, and 1.3 rebounds per game, he was waived by Portland.

=== Return to Phoenix (2024) ===
On March 4, 2024, very late in the season, Wainright returned to the Phoenix Suns on a two-way contract. In his third season with the Suns, he only played four games with the team, in which he averaged 4.1 minutes per game, due to him being a late return for the franchise.

=== Hapoel Tel Aviv (2024–present) ===
On July 10, 2024, Wainright signed with the Hapoel Tel Aviv of the Israeli Basketball Premier League. In 2024-25 he played in 50 games and averaged 22.0 minutes, 6.4 points, 3.4 rebounds, 1.4 assists, and 1.1 steals per game, as he shot 47.2% from the floor. On April 11, 2025, he won the EuroCup title and helped the team qualify to the EuroLeague.

In 2025-26 he played in 68 games and averaged 23.3 minutes, 5.8 points, 2.9 rebounds, and 1.0 assists per game.

On April 28, 2026, Wainright and the team agreed to a two-year contract extension.

== National team career ==
Wainright plays for the Uganda men's national basketball team. As an American born in Kansas City, Missouri, he was convinced by Uganda coaches George Galanopoulos (basketball coach) and Mike Schmitz to become a naturalized Ugandan to help build the team and increase employment opportunities. Wainright scored 36 points and collected 13 rebounds in his national team debut in a win over Cape Verde in November 2020. He was on the roster during AfroBasket 2021.

== Career statistics ==
Legend
GP	Games played	GS	Games started	MPG	Minutes per game
FG%	Field goal percentage	3P%	3-point field goal percentage	FT%	Free throw percentage
RPG	Rebounds per game	APG	Assists per game	SPG	Steals per game
BPG	Blocks per game	PPG	Points per game	**Bold**	Career high

=== NBA ===
==== Regular season ====
Year	Team	GP	GS	MPG	FG%	3P%	FT%	RPG	APG	SPG	BPG	PPG
2021–22	Phoenix	45	0	8.0	**.394**	.322	.583	1.2	.3	.4	.1	2.4
2022–23	Phoenix	**60**	**2**	**15.3**	.370	.329	.839	**2.3**	**.9**	**.6**	**.4**	**4.2**
2023–24	Portland	7	0	6.6	.333	**.375**	**1.000**	1.3	.0	.3	.1	2.9
2023–24	Phoenix	4	0	4.1	.167	.250	—	1.3	.3	.5	.0	.8
Career		116	2	11.5	.372	.329	.778	1.8	.6	.5	.3	3.3

==== Playoffs ====
Year	Team	GP	GS	MPG	FG%	3P%	FT%	RPG	APG	SPG	BPG	PPG
2022	Phoenix	**7**	0	**3.8**	**.417**	**.500**	—	**1.6**	**.1**	**.1**	.1	**1.9**
2023	Phoenix	6	0	3.5	.250	.250	—	.2	.0	.0	**.2**	.5
Career		13	0	3.6	.375	.400	—	.9	.1	.1	.2	1.2

== Personal life ==
Wainright's father, Calvin Wainright, was raised by Calvin's mother Marvine Wainright and his stepfather Alvin Joe; Calvin's biological father was former NBA player Maurice King. Calvin was a pastor and youth basketball coach in Kansas City, Missouri, until his death on October 31, 2022. In 2020, Calvin received the Kansas City People's Choice Humanitarian Award for his work in the city.

Ish Wainright was told about his grandfather by his mother's side of the family while he was playing for Baylor. He honored King during a game against Kansas University by using the name Ishmail King-Wainright throughout the game.

Wainright also has a younger brother named Amaad who previously played college basketball. Amaad played basketball collegiality at Trinity Valley Community College in the NJCAA, Kansas State University in the NCAA, and Louisiana State University Shreveport in the NAIA. During his only season in Kansas State, Amaad and the Wildcats made it to the 2018 NCAA tournament, going as far as the Elite 8 in their tournament run that season.

Wainright is also the cousin of current Sioux Falls Skyforce basketball player Tyon Grant-Foster, who went to Grand Canyon University after a recommendation from Wainright and a relationship from Baylor with Grand Canyon's coach, Bryce Drew. Grant-Foster previously played for Indian Hills Community College in the NJCAA, the University of Kansas, and DePaul University before a health scare in a season opener during his only game with DePaul against Coppin State University had him consider not playing basketball altogether at one point. During his only season at Grand Canyon, Grant-Foster won the WAC Player of the Year award and reached the All-WAC First Team in 2024, while leading the university to their first ever victory in the NCAA tournament by defeating St. Mary's College.

== See also ==
- List of second-generation National Basketball Association players
