= Landry Shamet =

American basketball player (born 1997)

- Shamet in 2026

No. 44 – New York Knicks
- Position: Shooting guard
- League: NBA

Personal information
- Born: March 13, 1997 (age 29) Kansas City, Missouri, U.S.
- Listed height: 6 ft 5 in (1.96 m)
- Listed weight: 190 lb (86 kg)

Career information
- High school: Park Hill (Kansas City, Missouri)
- College: Wichita State (2015–2018)
- NBA draft: 2018: 1st round, 26th overall pick
- Drafted by: Philadelphia 76ers
- Playing career: 2018–present

Career history
- 2018–2019: Philadelphia 76ers
- 2019–2020: Los Angeles Clippers
- 2020–2021: Brooklyn Nets
- 2021–2023: Phoenix Suns
- 2023–2024: Washington Wizards
- 2024: Westchester Knicks
- 2024–present: New York Knicks

Career highlights
- NBA champion (2026); NBA Cup champion (2025); NBA All-Rookie Second Team (2019); First-team All-AAC (2018); First-team All-MVC (2017); MVC Freshman of the Year (2017)
- Stats at NBA.com
- Stats at Basketball Reference

Landry Michael Shamet (/ˈʃæmɪt/) (born March 13, 1997) is an American professional basketball player for the New York Knicks of the National Basketball Association (NBA). He played college basketball for the Wichita State Shockers and was selected 26th overall by the Philadelphia 76ers in the 2018 NBA draft. He has also played for the Los Angeles Clippers, Brooklyn Nets, Phoenix Suns, and Washington Wizards.

== Early life ==
Landry Shamet was born on March 13, 1997, in Kansas City, Missouri, to Melanie Shamet, a single mother. Melanie Shamet attended Boise State University on a volleyball scholarship. Shamet's father, Ron Davis, is a former professional basketball player. Shamet did not know about his father until he was a teenager; he met him for the first time in 2021. Shamet is biracial.

Shamet's uncle Tyler was a positive influence in his life growing up, and his extended family also provided support in his development. Shamet began playing basketball at the age of two. When he was in middle school, his family went bankrupt after the mortgage increased and they lost their duplex.

Shamet briefly attended Desborough College before attending Park Hill High School in Kansas City, where he was coached by David Garrison.

== College career ==
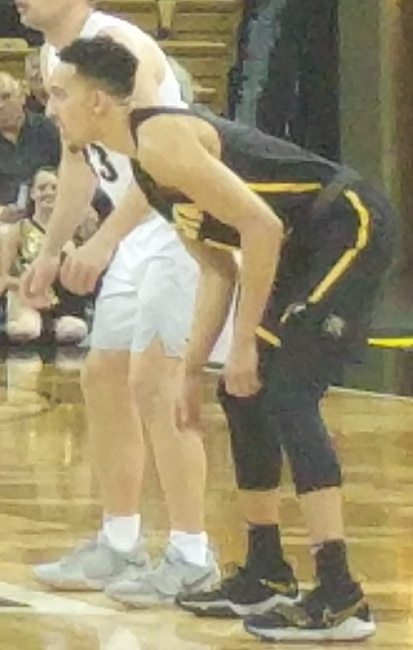
Shamet with Wichita State in 2018

Shamet played three games in his freshman season before having to redshirt the season due to a foot injury. In January 2017, he became the point guard for the Shockers. In his redshirt freshman season, Shamet averaged 11.4 points and 3.3 assists per game. He was named to the First team MVC All-Conference and MVC Freshman of the Year. Following the season Shamet had surgery to repair a stress fracture on his foot.

Coming into his sophomore year, Shamet was named to the Preseason First Team All-AAC and was one of fifty players named in the Preseason Wooden Award watch list. He was one of only two sophomores to be selected for the 2018 Wooden Award Midseason Top 25 list. Shamet scored a career-high 30 points to help Wichita State beat Oklahoma State 78–66 on December 9, 2017. Shamet led the AAC in several categories, including assists per game, true shooting percentage, and offensive box plus/minus. He also helped lead the Shockers to the NCAA Tournament each season he played. He averaged 14.9 points and 5.2 assists per game as a sophomore. Following the season he declared for the 2018 NBA draft.

== Professional career ==
=== Philadelphia 76ers (2018–2019) ===
Shamet was taken with the 26th pick in the 2018 NBA draft by the Philadelphia 76ers. In the 2018 preseason, Shamet averaged 8.8 points per game, with an 18-point performance in a 120–114 victory over the Dallas Mavericks in China.

Shamet scored a career-high 29 points off the bench on January 8, 2019, in a home victory over the Washington Wizards, including a Sixers rookie record 8 three-pointers.

=== Los Angeles Clippers (2019–2020) ===
On February 6, 2019, Shamet was traded to the Los Angeles Clippers. In his first game with them, he scored 17 points, 13 of which were in the 4th quarter, in a comeback from 28 down against the Boston Celtics. On April 15, in Game 2 of the first round against the Golden State Warriors, he scored 12 points and the game winning 3-pointer in a 31-point comeback leading to a 135–131 Clippers victory.

In Game 7 of the second round in the 2020 NBA playoffs, Shamet turned his ankle in the first quarter and had to leave the game, playing only six minutes. The Clippers lost 104–89 to the Denver Nuggets and were eliminated.

=== Brooklyn Nets (2020–2021) ===
On November 19, 2020, Shamet was traded to the Brooklyn Nets in a three-team trade that sent Luke Kennard to the Clippers. On January 14, 2021, Shamet switched his number from 13 to 20 since James Harden was traded to the Nets and wanted to wear the number 13.

=== Phoenix Suns (2021–2023) ===
On August 6, 2021, Shamet was traded to the Phoenix Suns in exchange for Jevon Carter and the draft rights to Day'Ron Sharpe. On October 18, he signed a four-year, $43 million rookie scale extension with the Suns. On December 20, 2022, Shamet scored a career-high 31 points, including tying a franchise-record with 9 three-pointers made in a single game, in a 113–110 loss to the Washington Wizards. . The record was shared with teammate Cameron Johnson, and former Suns players Aron Baynes, Channing Frye, and Quentin Richardson. He later tied his career-high in points scored five days later on Christmas Day in an overtime loss to the Denver Nuggets. On May 7, 2023, Shamet scored 19 points during a 129–124 win over the Denver Nuggets during the Western Conference Semifinals.

=== Washington Wizards (2023–2024) ===
On June 24, 2023, the Suns traded Shamet, along with Chris Paul, four first-round pick swaps, and six second-round picks, to the Washington Wizards in exchange for Bradley Beal, Jordan Goodwin, and Isaiah Todd.

On July 6, 2024, Shamet was waived by the Wizards.

=== Westchester/New York Knicks (2024–present) ===
On September 14, 2024, Shamet signed with the New York Knicks. However, he was waived on October 19 amid suffering a dislocated shoulder in an NBA preseason game against the Charlotte Hornets on October 15.

On October 26, 2024, Shamet joined the Westchester Knicks after being selected in the 2024 NBA G League draft and on December 23, he re-signed with the Knicks. Shamet made 50 appearances for New York during the 2024–25 NBA season, averaging 5.7 points, 1.2 rebounds, and 0.5 assists.

On September 11, 2025, Shamet re-signed with the Knicks on a one-year contract. On November 14, Shamet scored a career-high 36 points, helping the Knicks defeat the Miami Heat 140–132. On November 26, Shamet was ruled out for at least four weeks after suffering a sprained right shoulder. In Game 1 of the Eastern Conference Finals, Shamet played key defense and hit three crucial three pointers in the 4th quarter and overtime of the Knicks' 22-point comeback win over the Cleveland Cavaliers in overtime, 115–104. He made 11 of 12 three point attempts in this series for a 91.7% three point shooting percentage, the highest ever in an NBA postseason series for player attempting at least ten three point shots. In Game 5 of the NBA Finals, Shamet helped the Knicks achieve a 94–90 win and close out the NBA Finals against the Spurs, 4–1, securing the Knicks' first NBA championship in 53 years.

On June 29, 2026, Shamet re-signed with the Knicks on a four-year, $24 million contract.

== Personal life ==
While attending Park Hill High School, Shamet became friends with World Series Champion and Milwaukee Brewers pitcher Aaron Ashby.

== Career statistics ==
Legend
GP	Games played	GS	Games started	MPG	Minutes per game
FG%	Field goal percentage	3P%	3-point field goal percentage	FT%	Free throw percentage
RPG	Rebounds per game	APG	Assists per game	SPG	Steals per game
BPG	Blocks per game	PPG	Points per game	**Bold**	Career high
†	Won an NBA championship

=== NBA ===
==== Regular season ====
Year	Team	GP	GS	MPG	FG%	3P%	FT%	RPG	APG	SPG	BPG	PPG
2018–19	Philadelphia	54	4	20.5	.441	.404	.815	1.4	1.1	.4	.1	8.3
2018–19	L.A. Clippers	25	23	**27.8**	.414	**.450**	.795	**2.2**	**2.3**	.5	.1	**10.9**
2019–20	L.A. Clippers	53	**30**	27.4	.404	.375	.855	1.9	1.9	.4	**.2**	9.3
2020–21	Brooklyn	61	12	23.0	.408	.387	.846	1.8	1.6	.5	**.2**	9.3
2021–22	Phoenix	**69**	14	20.8	.394	.368	.840	1.8	1.6	.4	.1	8.3
2022–23	Phoenix	40	9	20.2	.377	.377	**.882**	1.7	**2.3**	**.7**	.1	8.7
2023–24	Washington	46	5	15.8	.431	.338	.826	1.3	1.2	.5	**.2**	7.1
2024–25	New York	50	0	15.2	**.461**	.397	.667	1.2	.5	.5	.0	5.7
2025–26†	New York	51	12	23.0	.437	.392	.711	1.8	1.4	.6	**.2**	9.3
Career		449	109	21.3	.416	.386	.815	1.7	1.5	.5	.1	8.4

==== Playoffs ====
Year	Team	GP	GS	MPG	FG%	3P%	FT%	RPG	APG	SPG	BPG	PPG
2019	L.A. Clippers	6	**6**	**29.0**	.342	.323	**1.000**	**2.0**	**1.7**	**1.0**	.0	**7.7**
2020	L.A. Clippers	13	4	18.7	.407	.357	.714	1.7	1.3	.5	**.2**	5.2
2021	Brooklyn	12	0	17.2	.439	.385	.800	1.8	.6	.4	.1	4.2
2022	Phoenix	12	0	16.0	.396	.346	.714	1.7	1.3	.5	.0	4.3
2023	Phoenix	10	1	18.4	.378	.379	.750	1.7	1.1	.2	.1	4.8
2025	New York	11	0	7.5	.450	.467	.250	.4	.7	.1	.0	2.4
2026†	New York	**19**	0	16.3	**.453**	**.475**	.778	1.1	.7	.2	.1	6.0
Career		83	11	16.8	.412	.396	.761	1.4	1.0	.4	.1	4.9

=== College ===
Year	Team	GP	GS	MPG	FG%	3P%	FT%	RPG	APG	SPG	BPG	PPG
2015–16	Wichita State	3	1	17.7	.438	.300	.750	2.7	1.7	**1.7**	**.3**	8.7
2016–17	Wichita State	**36**	**35**	26.7	.472	.439	.802	2.8	3.3	.7	.2	11.4
2017–18	Wichita State	32	32	**31.7**	**.489**	**.442**	**.825**	**3.2**	**5.2**	.7	.2	**14.9**
Career		71	68	28.6	.480	.437	.811	3.0	4.1	.8	.2	12.9
