= 2022–23 Phoenix Suns season =

Professional basketball season

- Head coach: Monty Williams
- General manager: James Jones
- Owners: Robert Sarver (Suspended for this season, effective September 13, 2022; removed from the team on February 7, 2023.); Sam Garvin (Interim team governor until February 7, 2023.); Mat Ishbia & Justin Ishbia (Official new owners from February 7, 2023 onward.)
- Arena: Footprint Center

Results
- Record: 45–37 (.549)
- Place: Division: 2nd (Pacific); Conference: 4th (Western)
- Playoff finish: Conference semifinals (lost to Nuggets 2–4)
- Stats at Basketball Reference

Local media
- Television: Bally Sports Arizona
- Radio: KTAR

The 2022–23 Phoenix Suns season was their 55th season of the franchise in the National Basketball Association (NBA), as well as their 30th season at the Footprint Center. It was also the last season under Robert Sarver's ownership tenure, as he was suspended from league-wide activities on September 13, 2022, due to an independent investigation on Sarver that began the season prior revealing inappropriate behaviors he had throughout his tenure as franchise owner of the Suns. He later announced in that same month that minority team owner and vice chairman of the Suns, Sam Garvin, would take over the majority of team duties for the rest of this season until new ownership bought out Sarver as the new majority team owners going forward. Sarver eventually accepted a deal to sell his ownership rights to both the Suns and Phoenix Mercury to an ownership group led by United Wholesale Mortgage CEO Mat Ishbia and his older brother Justin Ishbia for an asking price of $4 billion on December 20, 2022, with the NBA approving of the new ownership on February 6, 2023, and an official announcement confirming the deal coming a day later on February 7, 2023.

During that same period of time, forward Jae Crowder agreed to sit out the rest of the season with the Suns until a potential trade was announced, which occurred on the February 9, 2023 trade deadline. Crowder was ultimately involved in a four-way trade where he got sent to the Milwaukee Bucks while they sent their own assets to the Indiana Pacers and Brooklyn Nets. Nearing the trade deadline of the 2022–23 season, the Suns were involved in a blockbuster transaction, where they traded away Mikal Bridges, Cameron Johnson, four unprotected first round picks, and the right to swap first round picks with the Suns in 2028 to the Brooklyn Nets in exchange for 13-time NBA All-Star and 2-time NBA Finals MVP Kevin Durant and the re-acquisition of T.J. Warren.

The Suns failed to improve upon their 64–18 record from the previous season after a loss to the Cleveland Cavaliers on January 4, 2023. However, despite dealing with multiple injuries throughout the season, including injuries to Devin Booker in December and Kevin Durant in March, the Suns clinched their third straight winning season on March 31, 2023, with a win over the Denver Nuggets. They later secured their third straight playoff berth on April 4 against the San Antonio Spurs, with the #4 seed in the Western Conference being set two days later against the Nuggets.

In the playoffs, the Suns defeated the Los Angeles Clippers in the first round in a rematch of 2021's Conference finals in which the Suns won in six games. The Suns won in five games, winning the last four games of the series after losing the first game at home. In the conference semifinals, they faced the top-seeded Denver Nuggets, a rematch of 2021's Semifinals in which the Suns swept the Nuggets. However, the Suns lost in six games to the eventual champion, suffering a blowout loss on home court in the Semifinals for the second straight year.

The Suns fired head coach Monty Williams two days following their postseason exit after four seasons with the team. This season also became the last for long-time Suns broadcaster Al McCoy, who announced his retirement from broadcasting duties near the end of this season after serving the role for the Suns since the 1972–73 season. It also became the final season where Suns games were broadcast through Bally Sports Arizona (previously Fox Sports Arizona & FSN Arizona), as Mat Ishbia announced they would move their services onto more channels in the state of Arizona for a more widespread view after their regular season concluded. While Bally Sports tried to fight back against Ishbia's move by claiming a breach of contract happened, Bally Sports ultimately declined matching Gray Television's offer for the Suns, which later caused a chain reaction that led to Bally Sports Arizona losing broadcasting rights to other professional sports teams in Arizona before being shut down for good on October 21, 2023.

== Draft ==
The Suns did not hold any picks in the 2022 NBA draft.

== Roster ==
2022–23 Phoenix Suns roster
Players

Pos.	No.	Player	Height	Weight	DOB	From
C	22	Deandre Ayton	7 ft 0 in (2.13 m)	250 lb (113 kg)	1998-07-23	Arizona
F	55	Darius Bazley	6 ft 9 in (2.06 m)	216 lb (98 kg)	2000-06-12	Princeton HS (OH)
C	18	Bismack Biyombo	6 ft 8 in (2.03 m)	255 lb (116 kg)	1992-08-28	Democratic Republic of the Congo
G	1	Devin Booker	6 ft 5 in (1.96 m)	206 lb (93 kg)	1996-10-30	Kentucky
F	0	Torrey Craig	6 ft 7 in (2.01 m)	221 lb (100 kg)	1990-12-19	USC Upstate
F	35	Kevin Durant	6 ft 11 in (2.11 m)	240 lb (109 kg)	1988-09-29	Texas
C	11	Jock Landale	6 ft 11 in (2.11 m)	255 lb (116 kg)	1995-10-25	Saint Mary's
G/F	10	Damion Lee	6 ft 5 in (1.96 m)	210 lb (95 kg)	1992-10-21	Louisville
G	38	Saben Lee (TW)	6 ft 2 in (1.88 m)	183 lb (83 kg)	1999-06-23	Vanderbilt
G	2	Josh Okogie	6 ft 4 in (1.93 m)	213 lb (97 kg)	1998-09-01	Georgia Tech
G	3	Chris Paul	6 ft 0 in (1.83 m)	175 lb (79 kg)	1985-05-06	Wake Forest
G	15	Cameron Payne	6 ft 1 in (1.85 m)	183 lb (83 kg)	1994-08-08	Murray State
G/F	8	Terrence Ross	6 ft 7 in (2.01 m)	206 lb (93 kg)	1991-02-05	Washington
G	14	Landry Shamet	6 ft 4 in (1.93 m)	190 lb (86 kg)	1997-03-13	Wichita State
F	12	Ish Wainright	6 ft 5 in (1.96 m)	250 lb (113 kg)	1994-09-12	Baylor
F	21	T. J. Warren	6 ft 8 in (2.03 m)	220 lb (100 kg)	1993-09-05	NC State

Coaches
Head coach
- Monty Williams
Assistant(s)
- Mark Bryant
- Bryan Gates
- Jarrett Jack
- Patrick Mutombo
- Brian Randle
- Michael Ruffin
- Steve Scalzi
- Kevin Young (associate)

Legend
- (DP) Unsigned draft pick
- (FA) Free agent
- (S) Suspended
- (GL) On assignment to G League affiliate
- (TW) Two-way affiliate player
- Injured

Roster
Updated: February 15, 2023

== Standings ==
=== Division ===
Pacific Division	W	L	PCT	GB	Home	Road	Div	GP
y – Sacramento Kings	48	34	.585	–	23‍–‍18	25‍–‍16	9–7	82
x – Phoenix Suns	45	37	.549	3.0	28‍–‍13	17‍–‍24	9–7	82
x – Los Angeles Clippers	44	38	.537	4.0	23‍–‍18	21‍–‍20	9–7	82
x – Golden State Warriors	44	38	.537	4.0	33‍–‍8	11‍–‍30	7–9	82
x – Los Angeles Lakers	43	39	.524	5.0	23‍–‍18	20‍–‍21	6–10	82

=== Conference ===
Western Conference
#	Team	W	L	PCT	GB	GP
1	c – Denver Nuggets *	53	29	.646	–	82
2	y – Memphis Grizzlies *	51	31	.622	2.0	82
3	y – Sacramento Kings *	48	34	.585	5.0	82
4	x – Phoenix Suns	45	37	.549	8.0	82
5	x – Los Angeles Clippers	44	38	.537	9.0	82
6	x – Golden State Warriors	44	38	.537	9.0	82
7	x – Los Angeles Lakers	43	39	.524	10.0	82
8	x – Minnesota Timberwolves	42	40	.512	11.0	82
9	pi – New Orleans Pelicans	42	40	.512	11.0	82
10	pi – Oklahoma City Thunder	40	42	.488	13.0	82
11	Dallas Mavericks	38	44	.463	15.0	82
12	Utah Jazz	37	45	.451	16.0	82
13	Portland Trail Blazers	33	49	.402	20.0	82
14	Houston Rockets	22	60	.268	31.0	82
15	San Antonio Spurs	22	60	.268	31.0	82

== Game log ==
=== Preseason ===
2022 preseason game log
Total: 1–3 (home: 0–2; road: 1–1)
Preseason: 1–3 (home: 0–2; road: 1–1)

Game	Date	Team	Score	High points	High rebounds	High assists	Location Attendance	Record
1	October 2	Adelaide	L 124–134	Cameron Payne (23)	Mikal Bridges (7)	Chris Paul (12)	Footprint Center; 15,152	0–1
2	October 5	@ L.A. Lakers	W 119–115	Devin Booker (22)	Deandre Ayton (8)	Chris Paul (10)	T-Mobile Arena; 8,908	1–1
3	October 10	@ Denver	L 105–107	Devin Booker (20)	Deandre Ayton (11)	Chris Paul (8)	Ball Arena; 12,505	1–2
4	October 12	Sacramento	L 104–105	Duane Washington Jr. (31)	Bismack Biyombo (12)	Duane Washington Jr. (4)	Footprint Center; 16,085	1–3

2022–23 season schedule

=== Regular season ===
2022–23 game log
Total: 45–37 (home: 28–13; road: 17–24)
October: 5–1 (home: 4–0; road: 1–1)

Game	Date	Team	Score	High points	High rebounds	High assists	Location Attendance	Record
1	October 19	Dallas	W 107–105	Devin Booker (28)	Mikal Bridges (11)	Booker, Paul (9)	Footprint Center; 17,071	1–0
2	October 21	@ Portland	L 111–113 (OT)	Devin Booker (33)	Mikal Bridges (7)	Chris Paul (12)	Moda Center; 19,393	1–1
3	October 23	@ L.A. Clippers	W 112–95	Devin Booker (35)	Jock Landale (10)	Chris Paul (11)	Crypto.com Arena; 19,068	2–1
4	October 25	Golden State	W 134–105	Devin Booker (34)	Deandre Ayton (14)	Chris Paul (9)	Footprint Center; 18,055	3–1
5	October 28	New Orleans	W 124–111	Mikal Bridges (27)	Bismack Biyombo (13)	Chris Paul (9)	Footprint Center; 17,071	4–1
6	October 30	Houston	W 124–109	Devin Booker (30)	Landale, Johnson (7)	Chris Paul (15)	Footprint Center; 17,071	5–1

November : 10–5 (home: 8–1; road: 2–4)

Game	Date	Team	Score	High points	High rebounds	High assists	Location Attendance	Record
7	November 1	Minnesota	W 116–107	Cameron Johnson (29)	Chris Paul (8)	Chris Paul (12)	Footprint Center; 17,071	6–1
8	November 4	Portland	L 106–108	Devin Booker (25)	Deandre Ayton (8)	Chris Paul (11)	Footprint Center; 17,071	6–2
9	November 5	Portland	W 102–92	Devin Booker (24)	Dario Šarić (9)	Craig, Landale, Paul (4)	Footprint Center; 17,071	7–2
10	November 7	@ Philadelphia	L 88–100	Devin Booker (28)	Ayton, Booker (7)	Booker, Payne (5)	Wells Fargo Center; 20,347	7–3
11	November 9	@ Minnesota	W 129–117	Devin Booker (32)	Mikal Bridges (9)	Devin Booker (10)	Target Center; 16,062	8–3
12	November 11	@ Orlando	L 97–114	Cameron Payne (22)	Devin Booker (8)	Booker, Bridges (6)	Amway Center; 15,879	8–4
13	November 14	@ Miami	L 112–113	Devin Booker (25)	Deandre Ayton (12)	Booker, Payne (5)	FTX Arena; 19,600	8–5
14	November 16	Golden State	W 130–119	Cameron Payne (29)	Torrey Craig (10)	Booker, Bridges (9)	Footprint Center; 17,071	9–5
15	November 18	@ Utah	L 133–134	Devin Booker (49)	Deandre Ayton (10)	Devin Booker (10)	Vivint Arena; 18,206	9–6
16	November 20	@ New York	W 116–95	Cameron Payne (21)	Deandre Ayton (11)	Cameron Payne (9)	Footprint Center; 17,071	10–6
17	November 22	L.A. Lakers	W 115–105	Booker, Bridges (25)	Deandre Ayton (15)	Cameron Payne (7)	Footprint Center; 17,071	11–6
18	November 25	Detroit	W 108–102	Deandre Ayton (28)	Deandre Ayton (12)	Cameron Payne (10)	Footprint Center; 17,071	12–6
19	November 26	Utah	W 113–112	Deandre Ayton (29)	Deandre Ayton (21)	Devin Booker (7)	Footprint Center; 17,071	13–6
20	November 28	@ Sacramento	W 122–117	Devin Booker (44)	Deandre Ayton (12)	Bridges, Payne (7)	Golden 1 Center; 16,407	14–6
21	November 30	Chicago	W 132–113	Devin Booker (51)	Deandre Ayton (14)	Booker, Payne (6)	Footprint Center; 17,071	15–6

December: 5–11 (home: 2–4; road: 3–7)

Game	Date	Team	Score	High points	High rebounds	High assists	Location Attendance	Record
22	December 2	Houston	L 121–122	Devin Booker (41)	Mikal Bridges (8)	Cameron Payne (12)	Footprint Center; 17,071	15–7
23	December 4	@ San Antonio	W 133–95	Deandre Ayton (25)	Josh Okogie (11)	Devin Booker (8)	AT&T Center; 16,409	16–7
24	December 5	@ Dallas	L 111–130	Deandre Ayton (20)	Deandre Ayton (8)	Cameron Payne (10)	American Airlines Center; 20,227	16–8
25	December 7	Boston	L 98–125	Josh Okogie (28)	Ayton, Okogie (7)	Chris Paul (4)	Footprint Center; 17,071	16–9
26	December 9	@ New Orleans	L 117–128	Deandre Ayton (25)	Deandre Ayton (14)	Booker, Paul (7)	Smoothie King Center; 16,381	16–10
27	December 11	@ New Orleans	L 124–129 (OT)	Deandre Ayton (28)	Deandre Ayton (12)	Chris Paul (11)	Smoothie King Center; 18,681	16–11
28	December 13	@ Houston	L 97–111	Mikal Bridges (18)	Torrey Craig (12)	Chris Paul (7)	Toyota Center; 15,128	16–12
29	December 15	@ L.A. Clippers	W 111–95	Mikal Bridges (27)	Josh Okogie (11)	Chris Paul (13)	Crypto.com Arena; 15,778	17–12
30	December 17	New Orleans	W 118–114	Devin Booker (58)	Biyombo, Booker, Okogie (6)	Chris Paul (8)	Footprint Center; 17,071	18–12
31	December 19	L.A. Lakers	W 130–104	Chris Paul (28)	Deandre Ayton (11)	Chris Paul (8)	Footprint Center; 17,071	19–12
32	December 20	Washington	L 110–113	Landry Shamet (31)	Deandre Ayton (13)	Chris Paul (11)	Footprint Center; 17,071	19–13
33	December 23	Memphis	L 100–125	Deandre Ayton (18)	Ayton, Shamet (5)	Duane Washington Jr. (5)	Footprint Center; 17,071	19–14
34	December 25	@ Denver	L 125–128 (OT)	Landry Shamet (31)	Deandre Ayton (16)	Chris Paul (16)	Ball Arena; 19,642	19–15
35	December 27	@ Memphis	W 125–108	Duane Washington Jr. (26)	Deandre Ayton (10)	Duane Washington Jr. (8)	FedExForum; 18,239	20–15
36	December 28	@ Washington	L 102–127	Deandre Ayton (31)	Deandre Ayton (7)	Chris Paul (7)	Capital One Arena; 20,476	20–16
37	December 30	@ Toronto	L 104–113	Mikal Bridges (21)	Jock Landale (11)	Chris Paul (12)	Scotiabank Arena; 19,800	20–17

January: 7–8 (home: 5–3; road: 2–5)

Game	Date	Team	Score	High points	High rebounds	High assists	Location Attendance	Record
38	January 2	@ New York	L 83–102	Deandre Ayton (12)	Torrey Craig (7)	Cameron Payne (7)	Madison Square Garden; 19,812	20–18
39	January 4	@ Cleveland	L 88–90	Chris Paul (25)	Deandre Ayton (18)	Chris Paul (8)	Rocket Mortgage FieldHouse; 19,432	20–19
40	January 6	Miami	L 96–104	Deandre Ayton (23)	Deandre Ayton (14)	Bridges, Washington Jr. (7)	Footprint Center; 17,071	20–20
41	January 8	Cleveland	L 98–112	Duane Washington Jr. (25)	Deandre Ayton (11)	Deandre Ayton (6)	Footprint Center; 17,071	20–21
42	January 10	@ Golden State	W 125–113	Mikal Bridges (26)	Torrey Craig (14)	Dario Šarić (7)	Chase Center; 18,064	21–21
43	January 11	@ Denver	L 97–126	Torrey Craig (16)	Josh Okogie (9)	Okogie, Washington Jr. (5)	Ball Arena; 18,872	21–22
44	January 13	@ Minnesota	L 116–121	Damion Lee (31)	Deandre Ayton (11)	Mikal Bridges (6)	Target Center; 16,460	21–23
45	January 16	@ Memphis	L 106–136	Mikal Bridges (21)	Dario Šarić (7)	Damion Lee (9)	FedExForum; 17,794	21–24
46	January 19	Brooklyn	W 117–112	Mikal Bridges (28)	Deandre Ayton (14)	Mikal Bridges (9)	Footprint Center; 17,071	22–24
47	January 21	Indiana	W 112–107	Josh Okogie (24)	Bismack Biyombo (16)	Bridges, S. Lee, Okogie, Washington Jr. (4)	Footprint Center; 17,071	23–24
48	January 22	Memphis	W 112–110	Mikal Bridges (24)	Dario Šarić (8)	Chris Paul (11)	Footprint Center; 17,071	24–24
49	January 24	Charlotte	W 128–97	Cameron Johnson (24)	Biyombo, Craig (9)	Chris Paul (11)	Footprint Center; 17,071	25–24
50	January 26	Dallas	L 95–99	Johnson, Paul (22)	Deandre Ayton (20)	Chris Paul (10)	Footprint Center; 17,071	25–25
51	January 28	@ San Antonio	W 128–118 (OT)	Mikal Bridges (25)	Dario Šarić (13)	Chris Paul (11)	AT&T Center; 18,354	26–25
52	January 30	Toronto	W 114–106	Mikal Bridges (29)	Deandre Ayton (13)	Chris Paul (9)	Footprint Center; 17,071	27–25

February : 6–4 (home: 2–2; road: 4–2)

Game	Date	Team	Score	High points	High rebounds	High assists	Location Attendance	Record
53	February 1	Atlanta	L 100–132	Mikal Bridges (23)	Deandre Ayton (9)	Mikal Bridges (7)	Footprint Center; 17,071	27–26
54	February 3	@ Boston	W 106–94	Mikal Bridges (25)	Dario Šarić (13)	Chris Paul (8)	TD Garden; 19,156	28–26
55	February 4	@ Detroit	W 116–100	Deandre Ayton (31)	Deandre Ayton (16)	Chris Paul (14)	Little Caesars Arena; 19,788	29–26
56	February 7	@ Brooklyn	W 116–112	Deandre Ayton (35)	Deandre Ayton (15)	Chris Paul (12)	Barclays Center; 17,093	30–26
57	February 9	@ Atlanta	L 107–116	Josh Okogie (25)	Craig, Paul (5)	Chris Paul (8)	State Farm Arena; 17,003	30–27
58	February 10	@ Indiana	W 117–104	Deandre Ayton (22)	Torrey Craig (12)	Chris Paul (9)	Gainbridge Fieldhouse; 16,522	31–27
59	February 14	Sacramento	W 120–109	Devin Booker (32)	Deandre Ayton (11)	Chris Paul (19)	Footprint Center; 17,071	32–27
60	February 16	L.A. Clippers	L 107–116	Josh Okogie (24)	Ayton, Craig (6)	Chris Paul (11)	Footprint Center; 17,071	32–28
All-Star Game
61	February 24	Oklahoma City	W 124–115	Devin Booker (25)	Deandre Ayton (11)	Devin Booker (8)	Footprint Center; 17,071	33–28
62	February 26	@ Milwaukee	L 101–104	Devin Booker (24)	Deandre Ayton (11)	Devin Booker (8)	Fiserv Forum; 17,636	33–29

March : 9–6 (home: 5–2; road: 4–4)

Game	Date	Team	Score	High points	High rebounds	High assists	Location Attendance	Record
63	March 1	@ Charlotte	W 105–91	Devin Booker (37)	Deandre Ayton (16)	Chris Paul (11)	Spectrum Center; 19,137	34–29
64	March 3	@ Chicago	W 125–104	Devin Booker (35)	Kevin Durant (9)	Chris Paul (10)	United Center; 21,169	35–29
65	March 5	@ Dallas	W 130–126	Kevin Durant (37)	Deandre Ayton (16)	Devin Booker (10)	American Airlines Center; 20,311	36–29
66	March 8	Oklahoma City	W 132–101	Devin Booker (44)	Ayton, Wainright (8)	Chris Paul (9)	Footprint Center; 17,071	37–29
67	March 11	Sacramento	L 119–128	Devin Booker (28)	Deandre Ayton (12)	Chris Paul (16)	Footprint Center; 17,071	37–30
68	March 13	@ Golden State	L 112–123	Devin Booker (32)	Deandre Ayton (12)	Chris Paul (11)	Chase Center; 18,064	37–31
69	March 14	Milwaukee	L 104–116	Devin Booker (30)	Deandre Ayton (8)	Chris Paul (8)	Footprint Center; 17,071	37–32
70	March 16	Orlando	W 116–113	Devin Booker (19)	Deandre Ayton (7)	Chris Paul (7)	Footprint Center; 17,071	38–32
71	March 19	@ Oklahoma City	L 120–124	Devin Booker (46)	Torrey Craig (7)	Chris Paul (13)	Paycom Center; 17,897	38–33
72	March 22	@ L.A. Lakers	L 111–122	Devin Booker (33)	Bismack Biyombo (8)	Devin Booker (5)	Crypto.com Arena; 18,435	38–34
73	March 24	@ Sacramento	L 127–135	Devin Booker (32)	Devin Booker (8)	Chris Paul (13)	Golden 1 Center; 18,151	38–35
74	March 25	Philadelphia	W 125–105	Devin Booker (29)	Bismack Biyombo (13)	Chris Paul (8)	Footprint Center; 17,071	39–35
75	March 27	@ Utah	W 117–103	Devin Booker (24)	Deandre Ayton (8)	Chris Paul (10)	Vivint Arena; 18,206	40–35
76	March 29	Minnesota	W 107–100	Devin Booker (29)	Josh Okogie (9)	Chris Paul (6)	Footprint Center; 17,071	41–35
77	March 31	Denver	W 100–93	Kevin Durant (30)	Deandre Ayton (10)	Chris Paul (13)	Footprint Center; 17,071	42–35

April : 3–2 (home: 2–1; road: 1–1)

Game	Date	Team	Score	High points	High rebounds	High assists	Location Attendance	Record
78	April 2	@ Oklahoma City	W 128–118	Kevin Durant (35)	Deandre Ayton (11)	Devin Booker (10)	Paycom Center; 17,981	43–35
79	April 4	San Antonio	W 115–94	Devin Booker (27)	Deandre Ayton (11)	Booker, Craig, Okogie, Paul, Ross, Shamet (3)	Footprint Center; 17,071	44–35
80	April 6	Denver	W 119–115	Kevin Durant (29)	Kevin Durant (7)	Devin Booker (8)	Footprint Center; 17,071	45–35
81	April 7	@ L.A. Lakers	L 107–121	Torrey Craig (18)	Jock Landale (10)	Terrence Ross (6)	Crypto.com Arena; 18,997	45–36
82	April 9	L.A. Clippers	L 114–119	Saben Lee (25)	Darius Bazley (9)	Saben Lee (9)	Footprint Center; 17,071	45–37

2022–23 season schedule

=== Playoffs ===
2023 playoff game log
Total: 6–5 (home: 4–2; road: 2–3)
First Round: 4–1 (home: 2–1; road: 2–0)

Game	Date	Team	Score	High points	High rebounds	High assists	Location Attendance	Series
1	April 16	L.A. Clippers	L 110–115	Kevin Durant (27)	Chris Paul (11)	Kevin Durant (11)	Footprint Center; 17,071	0–1
2	April 18	L.A. Clippers	W 123–109	Devin Booker (38)	Deandre Ayton (13)	Devin Booker (9)	Footprint Center; 17,071	1–1
3	April 20	@ L.A. Clippers	W 129–124	Devin Booker (45)	Deandre Ayton (11)	Chris Paul (7)	Crypto.com Arena; 19,068	2–1
4	April 22	@ L.A. Clippers	W 112–100	Kevin Durant (31)	Deandre Ayton (13)	Chris Paul (9)	Crypto.com Arena; 19,068	3–1
5	April 25	L.A. Clippers	W 136–130	Devin Booker (47)	Deandre Ayton (11)	Devin Booker (10)	Footprint Center; 17,071	4–1

Conference Semifinals: 2–4 (home: 2–1; road: 0–3)

Game	Date	Team	Score	High points	High rebounds	High assists	Location Attendance	Series
1	April 29	@ Denver	L 107–125	Kevin Durant (29)	Kevin Durant (14)	Devin Booker (8)	Ball Arena; 19,762	0–1
2	May 1	@ Denver	L 87–97	Devin Booker (35)	Ayton, Durant (8)	Booker, Paul (6)	Ball Arena; 19,592	0–2
3	May 5	Denver	W 121–114	Devin Booker (47)	Ayton, Durant, Landale (9)	Devin Booker (9)	Footprint Center; 17,071	1–2
4	May 7	Denver	W 129–124	Booker, Durant (36)	Kevin Durant (11)	Devin Booker (12)	Footprint Center; 17,071	2–2
5	May 9	@ Denver	L 102–118	Devin Booker (28)	Kevin Durant (11)	Kevin Durant (7)	Ball Arena; 19,773	2–3
6	May 11	Denver	L 100–125	Cameron Payne (31)	Payne, Shamet (6)	Devin Booker (8)	Footprint Center; 17,071	2–4

2023 playoff schedule

== Player statistics ==
Legend
GP	Games played	GS	Games started	MPG	Minutes per game
FG%	Field-goal percentage	3P%	3-point field-goal percentage	FT%	Free-throw percentage
RPG	Rebounds per game	APG	Assists per game	SPG	Steals per game
BPG	Blocks per game	PPG	Points per game

=== Regular season ===
Phoenix Suns statistics
Player	GP	GS	MPG	FG%	3P%	FT%	RPG	APG	SPG	BPG	PPG
Torrey Craig	79	60	24.7	.456	.395	.711	5.4	1.5	.6	.8	7.4
Damion Lee	74	5	20.4	.442	.445	.904	3.0	1.3	.4	.1	8.2
Josh Okogie	72	26	18.8	.391	.335	.724	3.5	1.5	.8	.5	7.3
Jock Landale	69	4	14.2	.528	.250	.752	4.1	1.0	.2	.4	6.6
Deandre Ayton	67	67	30.4	.589	.292	.760	10.0	1.7	.6	.8	18.0
Bismack Biyombo	61	14	14.3	.578		.357	4.3	.9	.3	1.4	4.3
Ish Wainright	60	2	15.3	.370	.329	.839	2.3	.9	.6	.4	4.2
Chris Paul	59	59	32.0	.440	.375	.831	4.3	8.9	1.5	.4	13.9
Mikal Bridges^{†}	56	56	36.4	.463	.387	.897	4.3	3.6	1.2	.8	17.2
Devin Booker	53	53	34.6	.494	.351	.855	4.5	5.5	1.0	.3	27.8
Cameron Payne	48	15	20.2	.415	.368	.766	2.2	4.5	.7	.2	10.3
Landry Shamet	40	9	20.2	.377	.377	.882	1.7	2.3	.7	.1	8.7
Dario Šarić^{†}	37	12	14.4	.427	.391	.818	3.8	1.5	.4	.1	5.8
Duane Washington Jr.	31	3	12.7	.367	.360	.667	1.2	2.0	.2	.1	7.9
Saben Lee^{†}	23	1	15.8	.393	.379	.737	2.0	2.8	.8	.0	6.3
Terrence Ross^{†}	21	0	18.4	.428	.347	.857	3.3	2.0	.5	.1	9.0
Cameron Johnson^{†}	17	16	25.2	.474	.455	.818	3.8	1.5	.9	.4	13.9
T. J. Warren^{†}	16	0	12.3	.429	.316	.500	3.1	.7	.4	.3	4.2
Kevin Durant^{†}	8	8	33.6	.570	.537	.833	6.4	3.5	.3	1.3	26.0
Darius Bazley^{†}	7	0	8.7	.480	.250	.400	2.3	.9	.4	.7	4.0

=== Playoffs ===
Phoenix Suns statistics
Player	GP	GS	MPG	FG%	3P%	FT%	RPG	APG	SPG	BPG	PPG
Kevin Durant	11	11	42.4	.478	.333	.917	8.7	5.5	.8	1.4	29.0
Devin Booker	11	11	41.7	.585	.508	.866	4.8	7.2	1.7	.8	33.7
Torrey Craig	11	5	16.6	.578	.440	.889	2.3	.5	.5	.2	6.5
Deandre Ayton	10	10	31.9	.550		.522	9.7	1.0	.6	.7	13.4
Josh Okogie	10	5	17.5	.378	.143	.846	2.1	1.3	.6	.2	4.1
Landry Shamet	10	1	18.4	.378	.379	.750	1.7	1.1	.2	.1	4.8
Damion Lee	8	0	11.1	.300	.200	1.000	1.4	.6	.3	.0	2.1
Bismack Biyombo	8	0	9.8	.563		.500	3.4	.8	.0	1.3	3.4
Chris Paul	7	7	35.7	.418	.321	.500	5.0	7.4	1.7	.7	12.4
Cameron Payne	7	4	21.7	.479	.407	.000	2.0	2.9	.4	.3	8.1
Jock Landale	7	1	16.1	.630	.000	.643	4.0	.4	.4	.4	6.1
T. J. Warren	6	0	13.5	.316	.143	.750	1.2	.5	.2	.5	2.7
Terrence Ross	6	0	11.5	.296	.273		1.3	.2	.2	.3	3.7
Ish Wainright	6	0	3.5	.250	.250		.2	.0	.0	.2	.5

- ^{†} Denotes player spent time with another team in the season. Stats reflect time with the Suns only.

== Transactions ==
=== Trades ===
July 6, 2022	To Phoenix Suns (Australia) Jock Landale	To Atlanta Hawks Cash considerations
February 9, 2023	Four-team trade
February 9, 2023	To Phoenix Suns (United States) Kevin Durant (from Brooklyn) (United States) T.J. Warren (from Brooklyn)	To Milwaukee Bucks (United States) Jae Crowder (from Phoenix)
February 9, 2023	To Brooklyn Nets (United States) Mikal Bridges (from Phoenix) (United States) Cameron Johnson (from Phoenix) Draft rights to Juan Pablo Vaulet (2015 No. 39) (from Indiana) 2023 first-round pick (from Phoenix) 2025 first-round pick (from Phoenix) 2027 first-round pick (from Phoenix) 2028 right to swap first-round picks (from Phoenix) 2028 second-round pick (from Milwaukee) 2029 first-round pick (from Phoenix) 2029 second-round pick (from Milwaukee)	To Indiana Pacers (United States) George Hill (from Milwaukee) (Democratic Republic of the Congo) / (Spain) Serge Ibaka (from Milwaukee) (Nigeria) / (United States) Jordan Nwora (from Milwaukee) 2023 second-round pick (from Milwaukee) 2024 second-round pick (from Milwaukee) 2025 second-round pick (from Indiana via Milwaukee) Cash considerations (from Brooklyn)
February 9, 2023	To Phoenix Suns Darius Bazley	To Oklahoma City Thunder (Croatia) Dario Šarić 2029 second-round pick Cash considerations

=== Free agency ===
==== Re-signed ====
Player	Signed	Ref.
Bismack Biyombo	July 5, 2022	
Deandre Ayton	July 19, 2022	
Ish Wainright	August 3, 2022 (two-way contract); February 24, 2023 (regular contract)	

==== Additions ====
Player	Signed	Former team(s)	Ref.
Damion Lee	July 5, 2022	Golden State Warriors	
Josh Okogie	July 5, 2022	Minnesota Timberwolves	
Duane Washington Jr.	August 3, 2022	Indiana Pacers / Fort Wayne Mad Ants	
Saben Lee	October 11, 2022; January 11 & 21, 2023; February 1, 2023	Detroit Pistons / Utah Jazz / Raptors 905	
Terrence Ross	February 15, 2023	Orlando Magic	

==== Subtractions ====
Player	Reason left	New team(s)	Ref.
Aaron Holiday	Free agent	Atlanta Hawks	
JaVale McGee	Free agent	Dallas Mavericks	
Gabriel Lundberg	Free agent	(Italy) Virtus Bologna	
Elfrid Payton	Free agent	Fort Wayne Mad Ants / (Puerto Rico) Osos de Manatí	
Duane Washington Jr.	Waived two-way contract	New York Knicks / Westchester Knicks	
Mikal Bridges	Traded	Brooklyn Nets	
Cameron Johnson	Traded	Brooklyn Nets	
Jae Crowder	Traded	Milwaukee Bucks	
Dario Šarić	Traded	Oklahoma City Thunder	
