= Cameron Payne =

American basketball player (born 1994)

- Payne with Anadolu Efes in 2026

No. 22 – Anadolu Efes
- Position: Point guard
- League: BSL; EuroLeague

Personal information
- Born: August 8, 1994 (age 32) Memphis, Tennessee, U.S.
- Listed height: 6 ft 2 in (1.88 m)
- Listed weight: 183 lb (83 kg)

Career information
- High school: Lausanne Collegiate (Memphis, Tennessee)
- College: Murray State (2013–2015)
- NBA draft: 2015: 1st round, 14th overall pick
- Drafted by: Oklahoma City Thunder
- Playing career: 2015–present

Career history
- 2015–2017: Oklahoma City Thunder
- 2015–2017: →Oklahoma City Blue
- 2017–2019: Chicago Bulls
- 2017–2018: →Windy City Bulls
- 2019: Cleveland Cavaliers
- 2019–2020: Shanxi Loongs
- 2020: Texas Legends
- 2020–2023: Phoenix Suns
- 2023–2024: Milwaukee Bucks
- 2024: Philadelphia 76ers
- 2024–2025: New York Knicks
- 2025–2026: Partizan
- 2026: Philadelphia 76ers
- 2026–present: Anadolu Efes

Career highlights
- OVC Player of the Year (2015); Lute Olson Award (2015); 2× First-team All-OVC (2014, 2015); OVC Freshman of the Year (2014); No. 1 retired by Murray State Racers; Division II A Tennessee Mr. Basketball (2013)
- Stats at NBA.com
- Stats at Basketball Reference

Cameron Payne (born August 8, 1994) is an American professional basketball player for Anadolu Efes of the Turkish Basketbol Süper Ligi (BSL) and the EuroLeague. He played college basketball for Murray State and was selected 14th overall by the Oklahoma City Thunder in the 2015 NBA draft. After playing two seasons for the Thunder, he was traded to the Chicago Bulls in 2017, where he played for three seasons before being waived in 2019.

After being waived, Payne played for the Cleveland Cavaliers on 10-day contracts before heading overseas to play with the Shanxi Loongs of the Chinese Basketball Association (CBA). Payne returned to the NBA and signed with the Phoenix Suns in 2020, where he revitalized his career by becoming a key player off the bench, helping the team reach the NBA Finals in 2021. Since then, he has played for the Milwaukee Bucks, Philadelphia 76ers, and the New York Knicks.

== High school career ==
Payne attended Lausanne Collegiate School in Memphis, Tennessee. He grew from 5 ft 5 in (1.65 m) as a freshman to 6 ft 0 in (1.83 m) as a senior. Despite leading Lausanne Collegiate to a 2013 Division II state title in Tennessee, Payne was not a heavily scouted player by collegiate programs. He was considered to be a three-star recruit by Rivals.com and was not ranked in the top 100 prospects. He was recruited by William Small to play college basketball at Murray State, choosing the Racers over a few other schools. Payne then went from a relatively unknown college recruit to a potential NBA lottery pick.

== College career ==
As a freshman, Payne averaged 16.8 points, 5.4 assists, 3.6 rebounds and 1.7 steals per game. He was forced to start at point guard as a freshman due to an injury to Zay Jackson and began his collegiate career registering 21 points, five boards and four assists in the team's opener at Valparaiso. Payne earned first-team All-OVC honors and was named Freshman of the Year by the conference. As a sophomore, he was the Ohio Valley Conference Player of the Year after he averaged 20.2 points, 6.0 assists, 3.7 rebounds and 1.9 steals per game. Payne opted to declare for the NBA Draft after his sophomore season.

== Professional career ==
=== Oklahoma City Thunder (2015–2017) ===
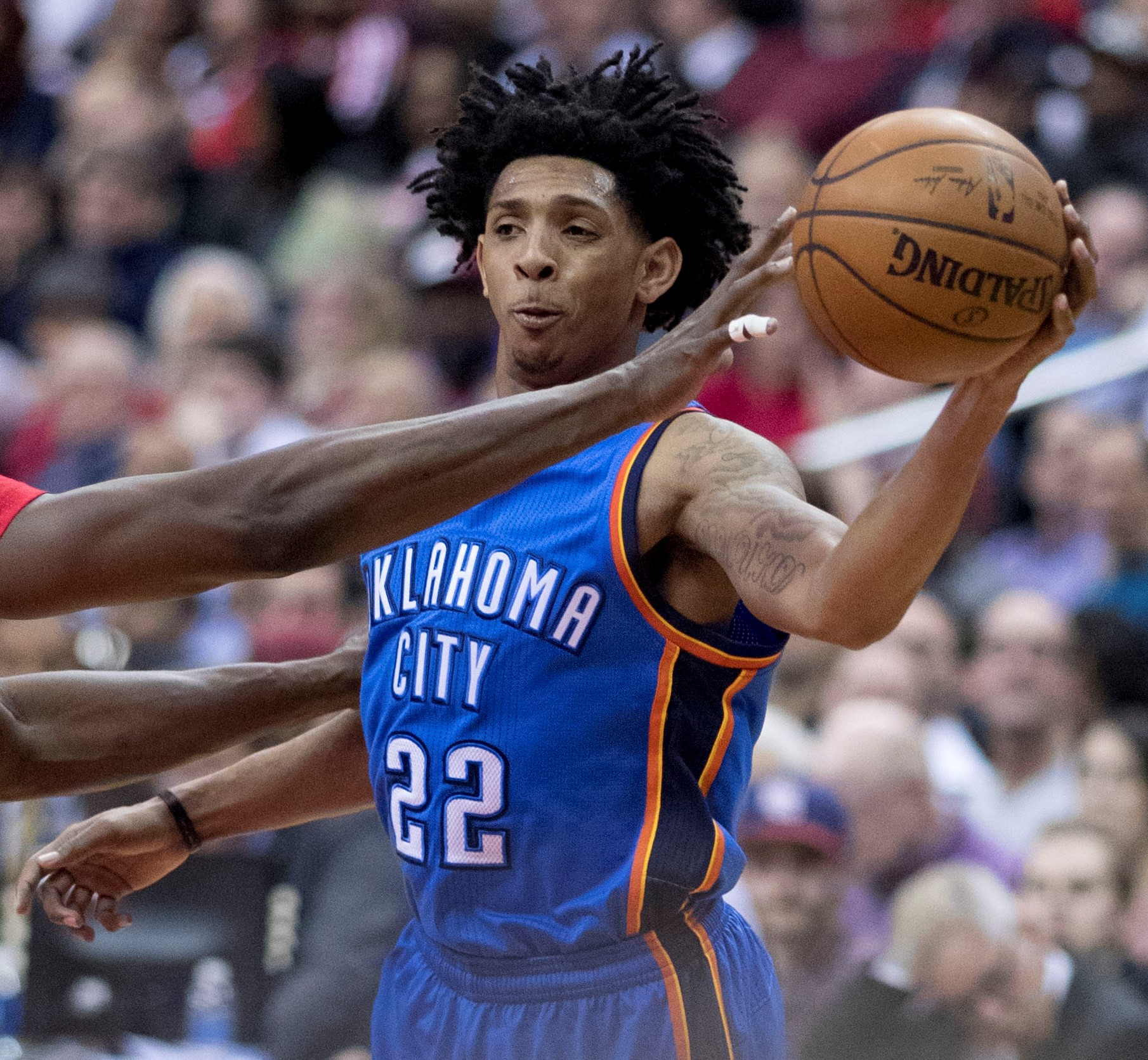
Payne with the Oklahoma City Thunder in 2017

During workouts before the NBA draft, Payne broke the ring finger on his non-shooting hand. The injury did not require surgery. On June 25, 2015, Payne was selected by the Oklahoma City Thunder with the 14th overall pick in the 2015 NBA draft. On July 10, 2015, he signed his rookie scale contract with the Thunder. He made his debut for the Thunder on November 1 in a 117–93 win over the Denver Nuggets, recording three assists in four minutes. On December 5, he was assigned to the Oklahoma City Blue, the Thunder's D-League affiliate. He was recalled on December 6, reassigned on December 15, and recalled again on December 16. On December 29, he had a 16-point effort in a 131–123 win over the Milwaukee Bucks. In the Thunder's regular-season finale on April 12, 2016, Payne recorded career highs of 17 points and seven assists in a 102–98 loss to the San Antonio Spurs.

On July 25, 2016, Payne underwent a successful procedure to repair a fractured fifth metatarsal in his right foot. He recovered quickly and was cleared to practice when training camp opened. He went through full contact during the Thunder's first two days of practice, but on September 27, he suffered an acute fracture to his fifth metatarsal in the team's Blue-White Scrimmage. As a result, he missed the first two months of the 2016–17 season. After spending six days with the Oklahoma City Blue in early January, Payne joined the Thunder playing group for the first time in 2016–17 on January 7. He subsequently made his season debut that night, scoring eight points in 13 minutes against the Denver Nuggets. On February 9, 2017, he scored a season-high 15 points in a 118–109 win over the Cleveland Cavaliers.

=== Chicago Bulls (2017–2019) ===
On February 23, 2017, Payne was traded, along with Joffrey Lauvergne and Anthony Morrow, to the Chicago Bulls in exchange for Taj Gibson, Doug McDermott and a 2018 second-round draft pick. During the 2016–17 season, Payne had multiple assignments with the Windy City Bulls, the Bulls' D-League affiliate.

On September 8, 2017, Payne was ruled out for three to four months after undergoing surgery on his right foot two days prior. He made his season debut for the Bulls on February 22, 2018, in a 116–115 loss to the Philadelphia 76ers. On March 17, Payne recorded his first professional double-double in his NBA career, putting up 13 points and a career-high 10 assists in a 114–109 loss to the Cleveland Cavaliers. On March 23, he had a career-high 17 points and six assists in a 118–105 loss to the Milwaukee Bucks.

On October 24, 2018, Payne scored all of his career-high 21 points in the second half of the Bulls' 112–110 win over the Charlotte Hornets, going 7 for 11 on 3-pointers. On January 3, 2019, he was waived by the Bulls.

=== Cleveland Cavaliers (2019) ===
On January 6, 2019, Payne signed a 10-day contract with the Cleveland Cavaliers. On January 16, he signed a second 10-day contract with the Cavaliers. He parted ways with the Cavaliers following the expiration of his second 10-day contract.

=== Shanxi Loongs (2019–2020) ===
On July 25, 2019, Payne signed a two-year, $3.7 million contract with the Toronto Raptors. On October 8, Payne played for 12 minutes against the Houston Rockets in a preseason game and tallied four points, one assist, and one rebound. On October 19, the Raptors released Payne.

On November 12, 2019, Payne was reported to join the Shanxi Loongs. He played in two games for the team, averaging 22.5 points, 6.0 rebounds, 7.5 assists and 4.5 steals per contest. On January 2, 2020, Payne was replaced.

=== Texas Legends (2020) ===
On January 25, 2020, the Texas Legends announced that they had acquired Payne.

During the week of March 3, 2020, Payne was named the NBA G-League Player of the Week, averaging 23.3 points, 7.3 rebounds, 10.3 assists, 2.7 steals, and 1.3 blocks per game while leading the Legends to a perfect 3–0 record for the week.

=== Phoenix Suns (2020–2023) ===
On June 30, 2020, Payne agreed to a two-season deal with the Phoenix Suns. He made his debut on July 31 in the 2020 NBA Bubble, where he recorded nine points, three rebounds, two assists, and two steals on a plus-minus of +21 in a 125–112 win over the Washington Wizards. On August 7, 2020, Payne recorded a season-high 15 points in a 114–99 win over the Indiana Pacers. He later repeated his season-high in a blowout 128–102 win over the Dallas Mavericks, helping the team be undefeated in all eight games the Suns played in the bubble while coming off the bench and having his highest scoring and rebounding season averages in the NBA yet.

After his successful time in the bubble, Payne had his second season option picked up on November 18, 2020. In his second season with Phoenix, Payne continued the successful production he had in the 2020 bubble off the bench. On January 6, 2021, he tied his then career-high of 10 assists in only 16 minutes of play in a 123–115 win over the Toronto Raptors. On February 20, he scored a season-high 19 points and put up seven assists in a blowout 128–97 win over the Memphis Grizzlies. On March 4, Payne recorded his second career double-double in the NBA, leading the Suns that night with 17 points and 10 assists coming off the bench in a 120–98 blowout win over the Golden State Warriors.

On June 22, 2021, Payne recorded a then career-high in the Western Conference Finals against the Los Angeles Clippers, recording 29 points, along with nine assists, two steals, and two blocks in the Suns' 104–103 win. Payne helped the Suns reach the 2021 NBA Finals, but the Suns lost the series in 6 games to the Milwaukee Bucks. Following the season, Payne re-signed with Phoenix on a three-year, $19 million contract.

On March 4, 2022, Payne recorded a career-high 16 assists to go with 17 points in a 115–114 win over the New York Knicks. On November 16, 2022, Payne matched his then career-high of 29 points in a 130–119 win over the defending champion Golden State Warriors.

During the semi-final round of the 2023 NBA Playoffs, in a Game 6 against the Denver Nuggets, Payne broke his career high in points scored, scoring 31 points in a 125–100 loss. Payne led the Suns in scoring that night, with his next highest-scoring teammate being Kevin Durant with 23. The Suns would be eliminated after this game losing the series 4–2.

=== Milwaukee Bucks (2023–2024) ===
On July 17, 2023, the Suns traded Payne, a 2025 second-round pick, and cash considerations to the San Antonio Spurs in exchange for a protected second-round pick in 2024 and on September 11, he was waived. On October 2, he signed a one-year deal with the Milwaukee Bucks.

=== Philadelphia 76ers (2024) ===
On February 8, 2024, Payne was traded, alongside a 2027 second-round pick to the Philadelphia 76ers in exchange for Patrick Beverley. On February 9, Payne made his 76ers debut, putting up 20 points and six assists in a 127–121 loss to the Atlanta Hawks.

=== New York Knicks (2024–2025) ===
On July 15, 2024, Payne signed with the New York Knicks. In game one of the first-round playoff series against the Detroit Pistons, Payne led a rally by scoring 11 of his 14 points in the 4th quarter to help seal the win for the Knicks.

On October 9, 2025, Payne signed with the Indiana Pacers, but was later waived after playing for them in preseason.

=== Partizan (2025–2026) ===
On December 23, 2025, Payne signed with Partizan of the Serbian SuperLeague, ABA League, and the EuroLeague.

=== Second stint with 76ers (2026) ===
On February 18, 2026, Payne signed with the Philadelphia 76ers. On March 10, Payne put up a career-high 32 points in a 139–129 win over the Memphis Grizzlies. He made 22 total appearances (including one start) for the team, recording averages of 7.4 points, 2.0 rebounds, and 2.6 assists. On April 10, Payne was waived by the 76ers after Dalen Terry was converted to a standard contract.

=== Anadolu Efes (2026–present) ===
On October 3, 2026, Payne signed with Anadolu Efes of the Turkish Basketbol Süper Ligi (BSL) and the EuroLeague.

== Career statistics ==
Legend
GP	Games played	GS	Games started	MPG	Minutes per game
FG%	Field goal percentage	3P%	3-point field goal percentage	FT%	Free throw percentage
RPG	Rebounds per game	APG	Assists per game	SPG	Steals per game
BPG	Blocks per game	PPG	Points per game	**Bold**	Career high

=== NBA ===
==== Regular season ====
Year	Team	GP	GS	MPG	FG%	3P%	FT%	RPG	APG	SPG	BPG	PPG
2015–16	Oklahoma City	57	1	12.2	.410	.324	.792	1.5	1.9	.6	.1	5.0
2016–17	Oklahoma City	20	0	16.0	.331	.308	**1.000**	1.6	2.0	.5	.3	5.3
2016–17	Chicago	11	0	12.9	.333	.324	.250	1.5	1.4	.4	.0	4.9
2017–18	Chicago	25	14	**23.3**	.405	.385	.750	2.8	4.5	1.0	**.4**	8.8
2018–19	Chicago	31	12	17.3	.411	.271	.880	1.7	2.7	.6	.2	5.7
2018–19	Cleveland	9	1	19.6	**.491**	.360	.688	2.1	2.6	.9	.3	8.2
2019–20	Phoenix	8	0	22.9	.485	**.517**	.857	**3.9**	3.0	1.0	.3	**10.9**
2020–21	Phoenix	60	1	18.0	.484	.440	.893	2.4	3.6	.6	.3	8.4
2021–22	Phoenix	58	12	22.0	.409	.336	.843	3.0	**4.9**	.7	.3	10.8
2022–23	Phoenix	48	**15**	20.2	.415	.368	.766	2.2	4.5	.7	.2	10.3
2023–24	Milwaukee	47	2	14.9	.455	.397	.841	1.3	2.3	.5	.1	6.2
2023–24	Philadelphia	31	8	19.4	.413	.382	.913	1.8	3.1	.6	.3	9.3
2024–25	New York	**72**	5	15.1	.401	.363	.907	1.4	2.8	.5	.2	6.9
2025–26	Philadelphia	22	1	17.0	.376	.330	.864	2.0	2.6	**1.1**	.3	7.4
Career		499	72	17.5	.417	.366	.837	2.0	3.2	.7	.2	7.7

==== Playoffs ====
Year	Team	GP	GS	MPG	FG%	3P%	FT%	RPG	APG	SPG	BPG	PPG
2016	Oklahoma City	10	0	6.4	.269	.200	.500	.4	.8	.2	.2	1.8
2017	Chicago	1	0	4.2	**.500**	**1.000**	—	1.0	.0	.0	.0	3.0
2021	Phoenix	**22**	2	19.0	.425	.362	**.889**	**2.5**	**3.2**	**.8**	.5	**9.3**
2022	Phoenix	13	0	13.2	.297	.167	.833	1.5	2.1	.5	.1	4.2
2023	Phoenix	7	**4**	**21.8**	.479	.407	.000	2.0	2.9	.4	.3	8.1
2024	Philadelphia	5	0	12.2	.400	.444	—	1.2	1.4	.2	**.8**	5.6
2025	New York	14	0	7.3	.324	.238	.333	.6	.6	.4	.1	2.1
Career		72	6	13.5	.388	.324	.706	1.5	2.0	.5	.3	5.5

=== College ===
Year	Team	GP	GS	MPG	FG%	3P%	FT%	RPG	APG	SPG	BPG	PPG
2013–14	Murray State	34	34	**32.7**	.404	.341	.774	3.6	5.4	1.7	**.6**	16.8
2014–15	Murray State	**35**	**35**	32.2	**.456**	**.377**	**.787**	**3.7**	**6.0**	**1.9**	.5	**20.2**
Career		69	69	32.4	.432	.359	.781	3.7	5.7	1.8	.5	18.5

== Personal life ==
His father, Tony Payne, was once a youth basketball coach. He and his mother, Leshawn Payne, were also instrumental in helping Payne out with returning to the NBA after briefly being out of the league for China and the NBA G League.

On June 14, 2024, Payne was arrested in Scottsdale, Arizona, for not telling officers his real name as well as providing a false report to law enforcement, reportedly referring to himself as "Terry Johnson" according to police. Payne was taken to Scottsdale City Jail and was later released.
