= 07 Seconds or Less =

2006 book by Jack McCallum

:07 Seconds or Less
- Author: Jack McCallum
- Subject: Basketball
- Genre: Non-fiction
- Publisher: Touchstone
- Publication date: November 14, 2006
- Media type: Print
- ISBN: 074329811X
- OCLC: 75280157
- Dewey Decimal: 796.323/640979173 22
- LC Class: GV885.52.P47 M33 2006

:07 Seconds or Less: My Season on the Bench with the Runnin' and Gunnin' Phoenix Suns is a book written by Jack McCallum about the Phoenix Suns' 2005–06 NBA season. It gives an inside look about the NBA team and its players, including Steve Nash and Shawn Marion, as well as the head coach, Mike D'Antoni, and his assistants.

The author of the book, Jack McCallum, joined Sports Illustrated in 1981 and became the chief NBA writer in 1985.
