= Jack McCallum =

American novelist and sportswriter (born 1949)

- Born: 1949 (age 76–77)
- Education: Muhlenberg College
- Occupations: Novelist and sportswriter

Jack McCallum (born 1949) is an American novelist and sportswriter.

== Early life and education ==
He graduated from Muhlenberg College, in Allentown, Pennsylvania, in 1971.

== Career ==
McCallum joined the staff of Sports Illustrated magazine in 1981, and became known for his articles on the National Basketball Association (NBA). He won the Basketball Hall of Fame's Curt Gowdy Media Award – Print in 2005.

During the 2005–06 NBA pre-season, McCallum began working as an unofficial assistant coach with the Phoenix Suns NBA basketball team, based in Phoenix, Arizona, as part of an assignment for Sports Illustrated. The piece soon evolved into a larger project, as the Suns granted McCallum full access to their practices and strategy sessions throughout the entire season. The resulting work was his book :07 Seconds or Less – My Season on the Bench with the Runnin' and Gunnin' Phoenix Suns (2006).

In November 2008, McCallum announced that he had accepted a contract buyout from Sports Illustrated, but he has continued to write pieces for the magazine as a special contributor.

Additionally, McCallum wrote Unfinished Business: On and Off the Court With the 1990-91 Boston Celtics, as well as Dream Team: How Michael, Magic, Larry, Charles, and The Greatest Team Of All Time Conquered the World and Changed the Game of Basketball Forever, a nonfiction book chronicling the players on the Dream Team and the events before, during and after the 1992 Barcelona Olympics.

His most recent work, entitled Golden Days (2017), is on Jerry West's L.A. Lakers and Stephen Curry's Golden State Warriors.

=== Novelist ===
With L. Jon Wertheim, McCallum also co-wrote a basketball novel, Foul Lines – A Pro Basketball Novel (2006).

=== Bibliography ===
- McCallum, Jack (2017). Golden Days: West's Lakers, Steph's Warriors, and the California Dreamers Who Reinvented Basketball. New York City: Ballantine Books. ISBN 978-0399179075.
- McCallum, Jack (2012). Dream Team – How Michael, Magic, Larry, Charles, and the Greatest Team of All Time Conquered the World and Changed the Game of Basketball Forever. New York City: Ballantine Books. ISBN 978-0-345-52048-7. (biography)
- McCallum, Jack; L. Jon Wertheim (2006). Foul Lines – A Pro Basketball Novel. New York City: Simon & Schuster. ISBN 978-0-743-28650-3. (novel)
- McCallum, Jack (2006). :07 Seconds or Less – My Season on the Bench with the Runnin' and Gunnin' Phoenix Suns. New York City: Simon & Schuster. ISBN 978-0-743-29811-7.
