= Phoenix Suns =

National Basketball Association team in Phoenix, Arizona

- 2026–27 Phoenix Suns season
- Conference: Western
- Division: Pacific
- Founded: 1968
- History: Phoenix Suns; 1968–present
- Arena: Mortgage Matchup Center
- Location: Phoenix, Arizona
- Team colors: Purple, orange, black, gray, yellow
- Main sponsor: Paze
- CEO: Josh Bartelstein
- President: Vacant
- General manager: Brian Gregory
- Head coach: Jordan Ott
- Ownership: Mat and Justin Ishbia
- Affiliation: Valley Suns
- Championships: 0
- Conference titles: 3 (1976, 1993, 2021)
- Division titles: 8 (1981, 1993, 1995, 2005, 2006, 2007, 2021, 2022)
- Retired numbers: 12 (5, 6, 7, 9, 13, 24, 31, 32, 33, 34, 42, 44)
- Website: nba.com/suns
Association	Icon

The Phoenix Suns are an American professional basketball team based in Phoenix, Arizona. The Suns compete in the National Basketball Association (NBA) as a member of the Pacific Division of the Western Conference. They are the only team in their division not to be based in California. The Suns play their home games at the Mortgage Matchup Center (formerly Footprint Center)

The franchise began play in 1968 as an expansion team. Though their early years were mired in mediocrity, their fortunes changed in the 1970s after partnering Dick Van Arsdale and Alvan Adams with Paul Westphal. The team reached the 1976 NBA Finals, in what is considered to be one of the biggest upsets in NBA history. However, after failing to capture a championship, the Suns would rebuild around Walter Davis for a majority of the 1980s, until the acquisition of Kevin Johnson in 1988.

Under Johnson's leadership, and following the acquisition of perennial All-Star Charles Barkley, the Suns became a consistent playoff team. With contributions from Tom Chambers and Dan Majerle, the Suns reached the playoffs for a franchise-record thirteen consecutive seasons and reached the 1993 NBA Finals. However, the team failed to win the championship and entered into another period of mediocrity until the early 2000s.

In 2004, the Suns signed free agent Steve Nash (who had blossomed for the Dallas Mavericks after being traded from Phoenix six years earlier), and returned into playoff contention. With Nash, Shawn Marion, and Amar'e Stoudemire, and under head coach Mike D'Antoni, the Suns became renowned worldwide for their quick, dynamic offense, which led them to tie a franchise record in wins in the 2004–05 season. Two more top-two conference placements followed, but the Suns again failed to attain an NBA championship, and were forced into another rebuild.

After ten consecutive seasons without a playoff berth, the Suns reached the 2021 NBA Finals after acquiring Chris Paul, who formed a quartet with their young core of Devin Booker, Deandre Ayton and Mikal Bridges, but would eventually lose to the Milwaukee Bucks in six games. In 2023, the Suns acquired 13-time All-Star and two-time NBA champion Kevin Durant and three-time All-Star Bradley Beal.

The Suns own the NBA's fifth-best all-time winning percentage, have the highest winning percentage of any team to have never won an NBA championship, and have the most NBA Finals appearances (three) without a championship. 13 Hall of Famers have played for Phoenix, while two – Barkley and Nash – won NBA Most Valuable Player (MVP) while playing for the team. Additionally, their Gowdy Award Winning radio announcer Al McCoy is the longest-tenured broadcaster in NBA history.

== History ==
=== 1968–1976: Team creation and early years ===
The Suns were one of two franchises to join the NBA at the start of the 1968–69 season, alongside the Milwaukee Bucks from Milwaukee. They were the first major professional sports franchise in the Phoenix market and in the entire state of Arizona, and remained the only one for the better part of 20 years (a Phoenix Roadrunners team played in the World Hockey Association from 1974 to 1977) until the Arizona Cardinals of the National Football League relocated from St. Louis in 1988. The Suns played their first 24 seasons at Arizona Veterans Memorial Coliseum, called the "Madhouse on McDowell", located slightly northwest of downtown Phoenix. The franchise was formed by an ownership group led by Karl Eller, owner of a public enterprise, the investor Donald Pitt, Don Diamond, Bhavik Darji, Marvin Meyer, and Richard L. Bloch. Other owners with a minority stake consisted of entertainers, such as Andy Williams, Bobbie Gentry and Ed Ames. There were many critics, including then-NBA commissioner J. Walter Kennedy, who said that Phoenix was "too hot," "too small," and "too far away" to be considered a successful NBA market. This was despite the fact that the Phoenix metropolitan area was growing rapidly, and the Suns would have built-in geographical foes in places like in San Diego, Los Angeles, San Francisco, and Seattle.

After continual prodding by Bloch (who became president of the Phoenix Suns), in 1968 the NBA board of governors granted franchises to Phoenix and Milwaukee on January 22, 1968, with an entry fee of $2 million. The Suns nickname was among 28,000 entries that were formally chosen in a name-the-team contest sponsored by The Arizona Republic, with the winner awarded $1,000 and season tickets for the inaugural season. Suns was preferred over Scorpions, Rattlers, Thunderbirds, Wranglers, Mavericks, Tumbleweeds, Mustangs and Cougars. Stan Fabe, who owned a commercial printing plant in Tucson, designed the team's first iconic logo for a mere $200.

In the 1968 NBA expansion draft, notable Suns pickups were future Hall of Famer Gail Goodrich and Dick Van Arsdale.

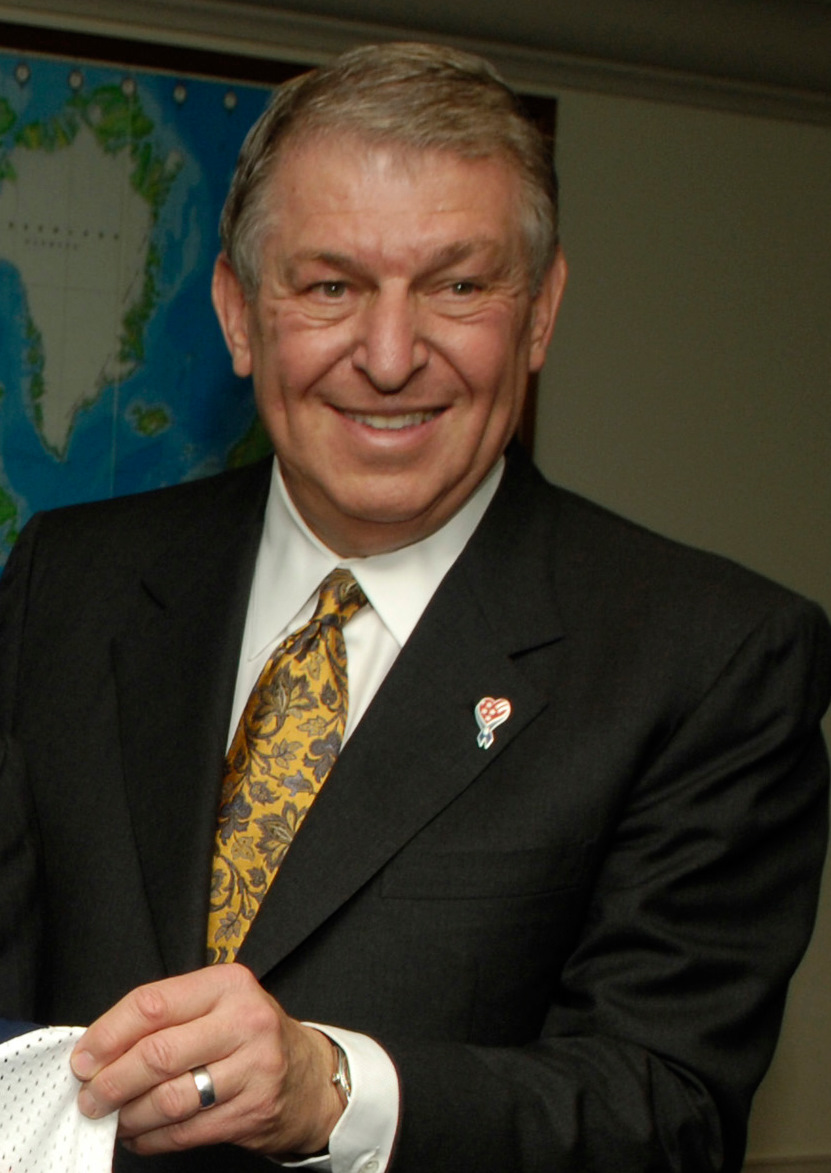
In 1968, Jerry Colangelo became the Suns first general manager, at age 28

Jerry Colangelo, then a player scout, came over from the Chicago Bulls, a franchise formed two years earlier, as the Suns' first general manager at the age of 28, along with Johnny "Red" Kerr as head coach. Unlike the first-year success that Colangelo and Kerr had in Chicago, in which the Bulls finished with a first-year expansion record of 33 wins and a playoff berth (plus a Coach of the Year award for Kerr), Phoenix finished its first year at 16–66, and finished 25 games out of the final playoff spot.

Both Goodrich and Van Arsdale were selected to the All-Star Game in their first season with the Suns. Goodrich returned to his former team, the Lakers, after two seasons with the Suns, but Van Arsdale spent the rest of his playing days as a Sun and a one-time head coach for Phoenix.

The Suns' last-place finish that season led to a coin flip for the number-one overall pick for the 1969 NBA draft with the expansion-mate Bucks. Milwaukee won the flip, and the rights to draft UCLA center Kareem Abdul-Jabbar (then known as Lew Alcindor), while Phoenix settled on drafting center Neal Walk from Florida. The 1969–70 season posted better results for the Suns, finishing 39–43, but lost to the Los Angeles Lakers in the first round of the playoffs. The next two seasons (1970–71 and 1971–72), the Suns finished with 48- and 49-win seasons, but did not qualify for the playoffs in either year, and did not reach the playoffs again until 1976. The major draw for the franchise in this era was the dramatic play of Connie Hawkins.

This era was also marked by the arrival of longtime Suns play-by-play and Naismith Hall of Fame announcer Al McCoy, hired by Jerry Colangelo before the start of the 1972–73 NBA season. Soon locally renowned as "the Voice of the Suns", his broadcasts were simulcast on both television and radio from 1972 until 2003 when he became exclusive to the Suns Radio Network. He was still broadcasting Suns home games on radio as of the 2022–23 season, having called all three NBA Finals appearances for the franchise (in 1976, 1993, and 2021).

Colangelo called Al McCoy "the greatest salesman for the game of basketball in our entire state" and said that "he had as much to do with the success of the Suns as any player, coach or manager".

==== 1975–1976: Trip to the NBA Finals ====
The 1975–76 season proved to be a pivotal year for the Suns as they made several key moves, including the off-season trade of former All-Star guard Charlie Scott to the Boston Celtics in exchange for guard Paul Westphal, a member of Boston's 1974 championship team. They also drafted center and eventual fan favorite Alvan Adams from the University of Oklahoma and guard Ricky Sobers of UNLV. The Suns and Buffalo Braves made a midseason trade, with Phoenix sending forward/center John Shumate to Buffalo in exchange for forward Garfield Heard.

Phoenix had an inconsistent regular season, starting out at 14–9 (then the best start in team history), then went 4–18 during a stretch where the team sustained several injuries (including Dick Van Arsdale breaking his right arm in a February game). The Suns then went 24–13 in the final 37 games to finish 42–40, clinching their first playoff spot since 1970. The Suns faced the Seattle SuperSonics in the first round of the Western Conference playoffs, winning the series four games to two, and beat the defending NBA champion Golden State Warriors in the Western Conference finals, four games to three, to advance to their first NBA Finals.

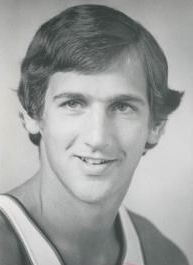
Paul Westphal led the Suns to their first-ever NBA Finals in 1976

The Suns faced an experienced Celtics team, led by eventual Hall of Famers Dave Cowens, John Havlicek and Jo Jo White. Game five of the 1976 NBA Finals took place at Boston Garden, where the Suns came back from a 22-point first-half deficit to force overtime. Havlicek made what was supposed to be a game-winning basket, but due to fans rushing the floor before time officially expired, officials put one second back on the clock with Phoenix having possession of the ball, but under their own basket. Instead of attempting a desperation heave, the Suns' Westphal intentionally called a timeout that they did not have, a technical foul, giving the Celtics a free throw, which Jo Jo White converted to put them up 112–110. However, this advanced the ball to half-court, and once the Suns had possession, Garfield Heard made a buzzer-beating turnaround jump shot to force a third overtime. The Suns' hard-fought battle was short-lived, as Boston's reserve player Glenn McDonald scored six of his eight points in the third overtime to lead the Celtics to a 128–126 win. Boston eventually won the series in six games, clinching the championship at the Coliseum, defeating Phoenix in game six, 87–80.

=== 1976–1988: From success to scandals ===
In the late 1970s and early 1980s, the Suns enjoyed several successful seasons including the 1981 Pacific Division title, making the playoffs eight consecutive seasons including an appearance at the 1984 Western Conference finals. Problems arose on and off the court in the mid-1980s. In 1987, the Maricopa County Attorney's Office indicted 13 people on drug-related charges, three of whom were active Suns' players James Edwards, Jay Humphries and Grant Gondrezick. These indictments were partially based on testimony from star player Walter Davis, who was given immunity. No defendants ever went to trial: two of the players went into a prosecution diversion program, while another received probation. Nevertheless, the scandal, although now perceived in many respects to be a witch hunt tarnished the reputation of the franchise both nationally and within the community. The scandal did provide an opening for general manager Jerry Colangelo to lead a group that bought the team from its owners for $44 million at the start of the 1987–88 season, a record at that time. With a drug scandal and the loss of promising young center Nick Vanos, who was killed in the crash of Northwest Airlines Flight 255, the franchise was in turmoil both on and off the court.

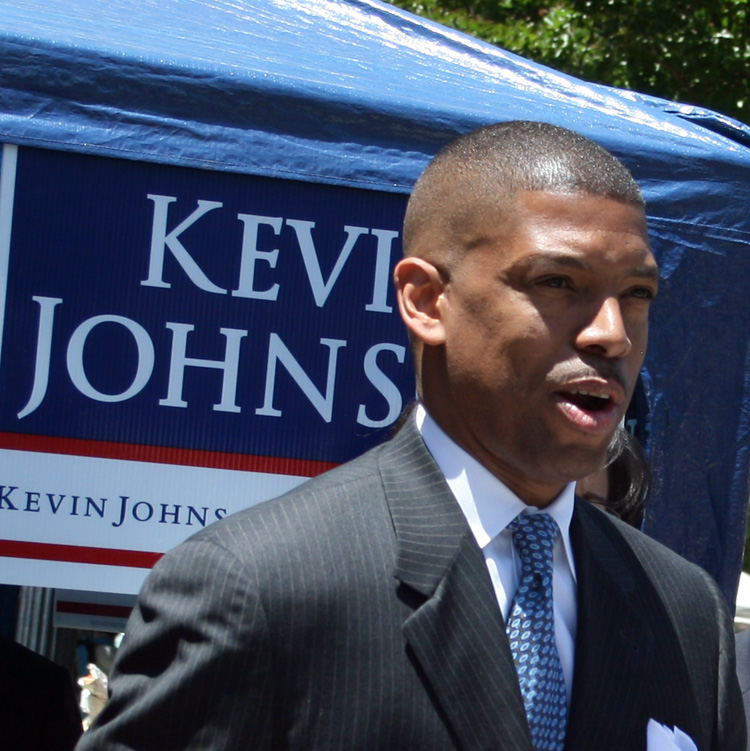
Kevin Johnson was the Suns' point guard for 11 seasons

=== 1988–1992: The Kevin Johnson/Tom Chambers/Dan Majerle era ===
The Suns' luck began to turn around in 1988 with the acquisition of Kevin Johnson from the Cleveland Cavaliers, along with Mark West and Tyrone Corbin, for All-Star power forward Larry Nance and Mike Sanders. This was the beginning of a franchise-record 13 consecutive playoff appearances. All-Star Tom Chambers came over from the Seattle SuperSonics (the first unrestricted free agent in NBA history), 1986 second-round draft pick Jeff Hornacek continued to develop, and "Thunder" Dan Majerle was drafted with the 14th pick in the 1988 draft. Kurt Rambis was added from the Charlotte Hornets in 1989, and the team upset the Los Angeles Lakers in five games during the playoffs that season, before falling to the Portland Trail Blazers in the Western Conference finals. In 1990–91, the Suns went 55–27 but lost in the first round to the Utah Jazz, 3–1. In 1991–92, the Suns went 53–29. Having sent four players to the All-Star Game in the previous two seasons (Chambers, Johnson, Hornacek, and Majerle), the Suns swept the San Antonio Spurs in three games in the first round of the 1992 NBA playoffs. The Suns then were defeated in five games to the Trail Blazers in the conference semifinals. The series was punctuated by a game four in which the Suns lost in double overtime 153–151 (the highest-scoring game in NBA playoff history to date). That game was the last Suns game ever played at the Coliseum.

=== 1992–1996: The Charles Barkley era ===
In 1992, the Suns moved into their new arena in downtown Phoenix, the America West Arena. The arena is occasionally referred to as the "Purple Palace" due to its purple seats, one of the Suns' colors. All-Star power forward Charles Barkley was traded from the Philadelphia 76ers for Jeff Hornacek, Andrew Lang, and Tim Perry. Barkley went on to win the MVP award that 1992–93 season.

In addition to Barkley, the Suns added key players to their roster, including Danny Ainge and draftees Arkansas center Oliver Miller and forward Richard Dumas (who was actually drafted in 1991 but was suspended for his rookie year for violating the NBA drug policy).

Under rookie head coach Paul Westphal, a former Suns assistant and player with the 1976 Suns in the NBA Finals, the Suns won 62 games in 1992–93, setting a franchise record. In the first round of the playoffs, they defeated the eighth-seeded Lakers, coming back from a 0–2 deficit in the five-game series. The Suns then eliminated the Spurs and SuperSonics, advancing to the NBA Finals for the second time in franchise history. They eventually lost to the Chicago Bulls, led by eventual Hall of Famers Michael Jordan and Scottie Pippen. The series also included a triple-overtime game in game three, making this and their previous game five in the 1976 series the only triple-overtime games in the history of the NBA Finals. Approximately 300,000 fans braved the 105° heat to celebrate the memorable season in the downtown streets of Phoenix after the Finals had ended.

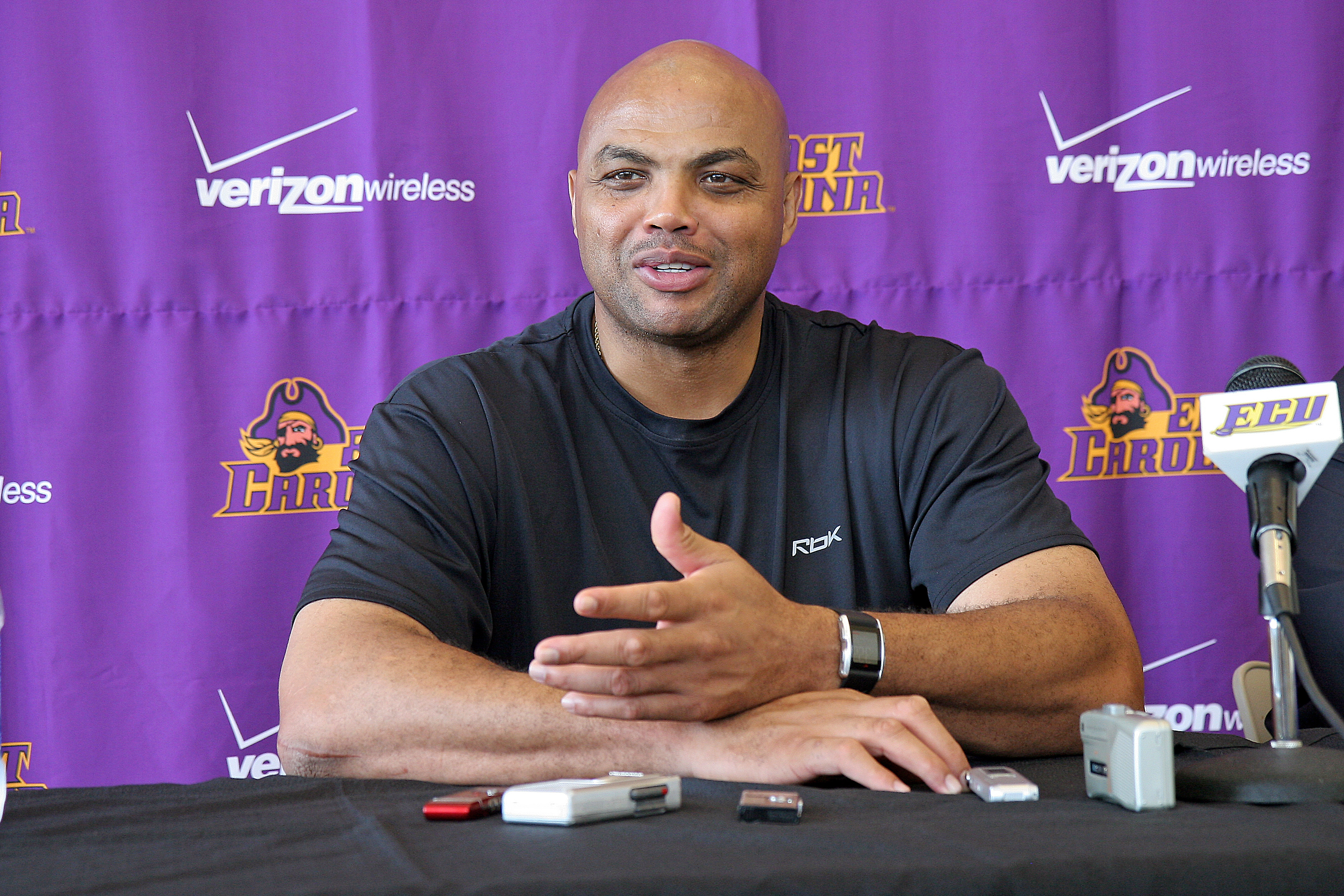
Charles Barkley won NBA MVP and led the Suns to the NBA Finals in 1993.

The Suns continued to be successful in the regular season, going 178–68 during the 1992–93, 1993–94, and 1994–95 seasons. They continued to bolster their roster by adding players such as A.C. Green, Danny Manning, Wesley Person, Wayman Tisdale, and Elliot Perry. Despite a Pacific Division title in 1995, the Suns were eliminated in consecutive Western Conference Semifinal rounds by the Houston Rockets, both series going a full seven games. Manning was rarely at full strength with the Suns, injuring his ACL in 1995 just before the All-Star break. In both years, the Suns led the series by two games at one point (2–0 in 1994, 3–1 in 1995) only to see the Rockets come back to win each series.

At the end of the 1994–95 season, Phoenix general manager Bryan Colangelo, the son of Jerry, initiated an eventually costly trade, sending the All-Star Majerle and a first-round draft pick to the Cleveland Cavaliers in exchange for John "Hot Rod" Williams. Majerle was a fan favorite in Phoenix and in the Suns' locker room. The trade was made to address the Suns' need of a shot-blocking center but Majerle's presence was missed and Williams's production never met expectations due to injuries.

The 1995–96 season was a disappointing year for the Suns, despite drafting NBA All-Rookie First Team member Michael Finley, who became unavailable for the playoffs due to injury. The Suns posted a 41–41 record and were eliminated in the first round of the playoffs by the San Antonio Spurs. Westphal was fired midway through the season and replaced by Fitzsimmons, his third stint as head coach. The office unrest led to turmoil in Barkley's relationship with Jerry Colangelo, who both spurned each other publicly. This led to Barkley being traded to Houston for Sam Cassell, Robert Horry, Mark Bryant, and Chucky Brown. Three of the four players were not with the franchise one year later.

=== 1996–2004: Average times ===
In the 1996 NBA draft, the Suns used their 15th pick for Santa Clara guard Steve Nash. During his first two seasons in the NBA, he played a supporting role behind star point guards Jason Kidd and Kevin Johnson.

After the Barkley trade, the Suns began the 1996–97 season 0–13, a franchise record for the worst start. During the 13-game losing streak, Fitzsimmons stepped down as the coach and was replaced by former player Danny Ainge.

After an on-the-court altercation between Ainge and Horry, Horry was traded to the Lakers for former Sun and NBA all-star Cedric Ceballos. Cassell was later traded to Dallas for all-star guard Jason Kidd. With a mostly small lineup, the Suns put together an 11-game win streak that put them in the playoffs as the seventh seed, in a series that almost upset the favored Sonics. Despite the loss in the playoffs, the Suns became one of the few NBA teams to make the playoffs after starting the season 0–10 or worse, and one of the few to make the playoffs after experiencing a 10-plus-game losing streak during the regular season.

With Kidd starting at point guard, Nash was traded to the Mavericks in June 1998 in exchange for Martin Müürsepp, Bubba Wells, the draft rights to Pat Garrity, and a future first-round draft pick (later used to select Shawn Marion).

In the off-season prior to the 2000 NBA season, the Suns traded for perennial All-Star Anfernee "Penny" Hardaway, creating the tandem of Kidd and Hardaway called "Backcourt 2000". However, the combination of Hardaway and Kidd was never fully realized as Hardaway missed several games during the middle of the 1999–2000 season and Kidd broke his ankle going into the playoffs just as Hardaway returned to the court. As the Suns entered the 2000 playoffs, they beat the higher-seeded San Antonio Spurs 3–1 in the best-of-five series. The Spurs were without their best player Tim Duncan throughout the whole series. However, even with the return of Kidd in the next round, the Suns fell to the eventual champion Los Angeles Lakers in a 4–1 series.

The Suns continued to make the playoffs until the 2001–02 season when they fell short for the first time in 14 years. That season marked the trade of Jason Kidd to the New Jersey Nets for Stephon Marbury. With the resultant high draft pick, the Suns were able to draft Amar'e Stoudemire.

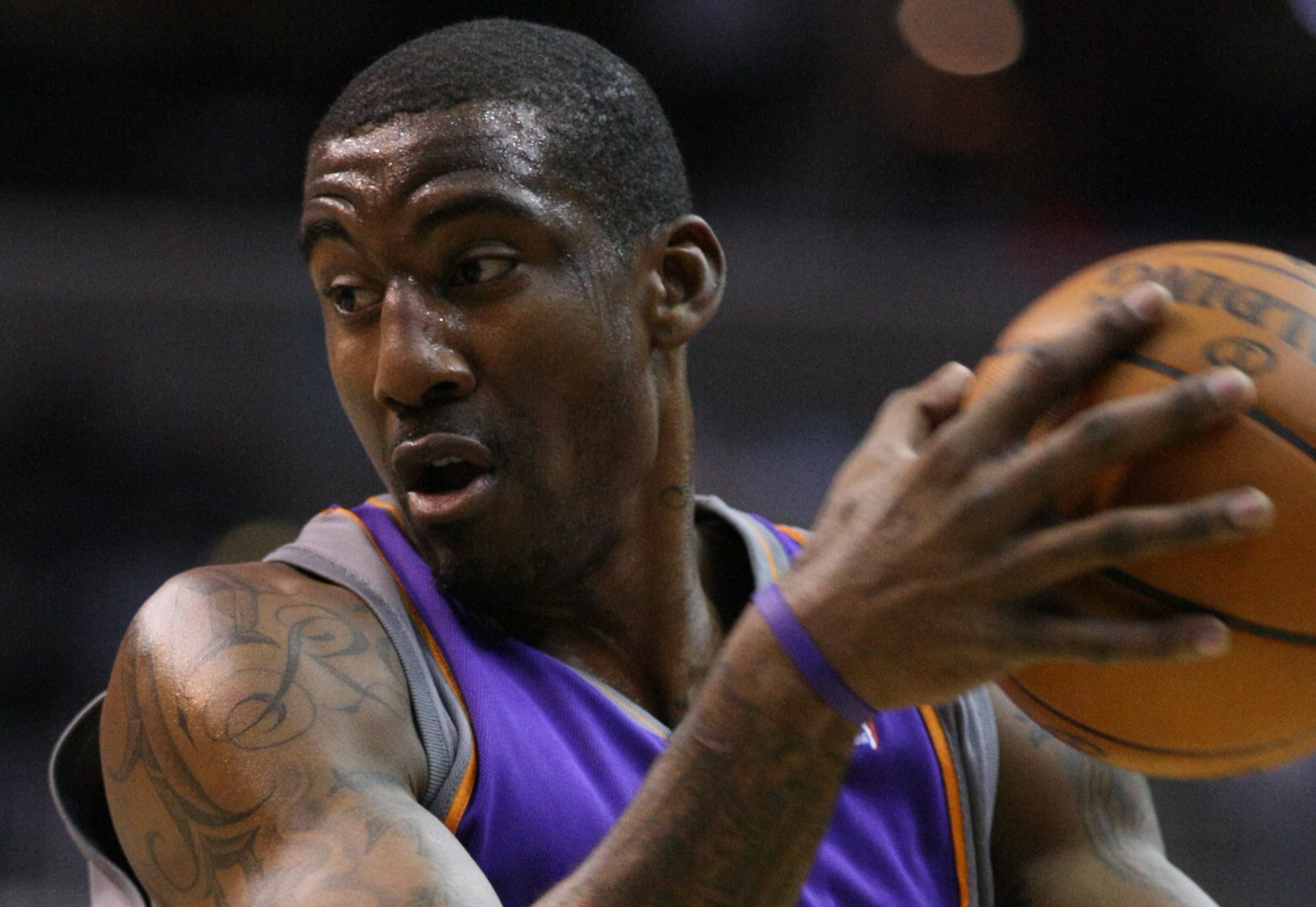
The Suns drafted Amare Stoudemire in 2002; he would become a six-time All Star

The 2002–03 campaign saw the emergence of Stoudemire, a graduate of Cypress Creek High School (Orlando, Florida). He became the first high school-drafted player to win the NBA Rookie of the Year for the 2002–03 season, during which the Suns posted a record of 44–38 and returned to the playoffs. Marbury had a successful individual season, making the All-NBA Third Team and being selected for the 2003 NBA All-Star Game. The Suns were eliminated in the first round once again by the San Antonio Spurs; a six-game series with the eventual NBA champions.

In the 2003–04 season, the Suns finished out of the playoffs with a 29–53 record. The Suns made a blockbuster mid-season trade sending Marbury and Hardaway to the New York Knicks for Antonio McDyess and a future first round pick that was later dealt to Denver.

=== 2004–2012: The Steve Nash era ===
==== 2004–2006: Nash wins back-to-back MVPs ====
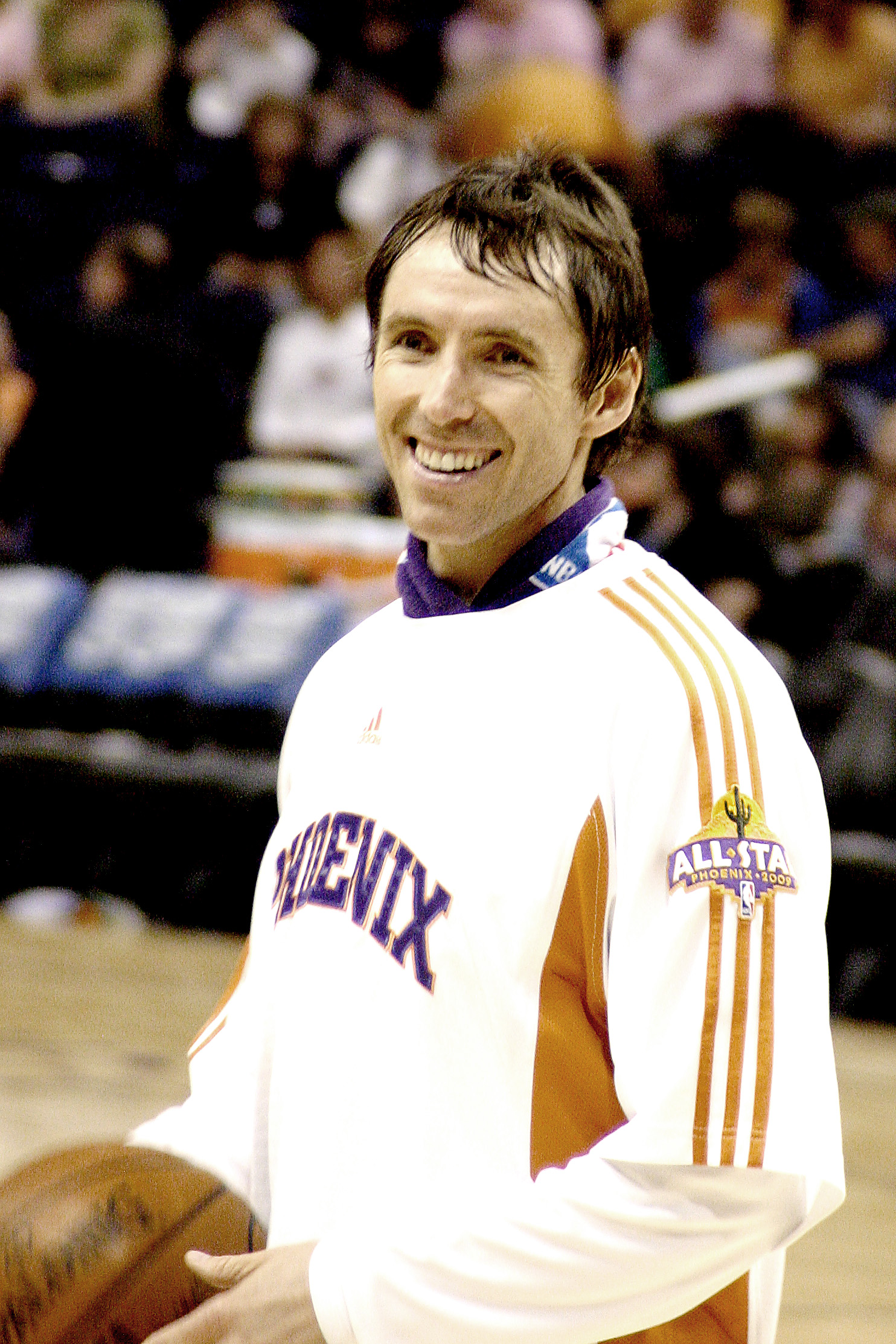
After Nash's return to Phoenix in 2004, they won 33 more games than they did the previous season.

The beginning of 2004 saw the departure of the face of Suns management since the team's inception, when Jerry Colangelo announced that the Phoenix Suns were to be sold to an investment group headed by San Diego–based business executive and Tucson native Robert Sarver for $401 million. The 2004–05 season marked the Suns' return to the NBA's elite, finishing with the best record at 62–20, and tying a franchise record set by the 1992–93 team. They set a team record for greatest one-season improvement at 33 games. During the off-season, the Suns signed unrestricted free agent All-Star point guard Steve Nash from Dallas, who had formerly played for the Suns at the beginning of his career. Nash went on to win the MVP award that season. Amar'e Stoudemire and Shawn Marion were named All-Stars and first-year coach Mike D'Antoni was named NBA Coach of the Year.

In the 2005 NBA playoffs, Phoenix was the first seed in the Western Conference. The Suns swept the Memphis Grizzlies, 4–0, and defeated the fourth-seeded Dallas Mavericks in the second round, 4–2, as Nash forced game six into overtime with a three-pointer in the closing seconds. In the Western Conference finals, the Suns played the San Antonio Spurs, who won the series 4–1, ending Phoenix's season, partly due to Joe Johnson missing the first two games of the series. Johnson went on to start the remaining games where he averaged 40 minutes per game and 18.3 points per game. The Suns lost the first two at home, as well as the following game in San Antonio to fall behind 3–0 in the series, before winning game four at San Antonio 111–106. The team then lost game five at home 101–95 to be eliminated from the playoffs. Stoudemire averaged 37.0 points per game during the series against the Spurs, the highest ever by a player in the Western Conference finals.

The 2005–06 NBA season began with Stoudemire undergoing microfracture surgery in his knee on October 18, 2005, missing all but three games that season. Shooting guard Joe Johnson also demanded a sign-and-trade deal to the Atlanta Hawks, in which the Suns got Boris Diaw and two future first-round picks. Other acquisitions included Raja Bell and Kurt Thomas. Despite the turnover in players, the Suns again won the Pacific Division, going 54–28 and capturing the second seed in the Western Conference. Nash was awarded a second consecutive NBA Most Valuable Player Award, becoming the second point-guard, after Magic Johnson, to win the award in consecutive seasons. Also, Diaw was named NBA Most Improved Player.

The Suns began the 2006 Western Conference Playoffs as favorites against the Los Angeles Lakers. After winning the first game in Phoenix, they found themselves trailing in the series 3–1 after impressive performances by Lakers' shooting guard Kobe Bryant. However, the Suns went on to win three straight games. With 7:33 left in the fifth game, Suns guard Raja Bell grabbed Bryant around the neck and threw him down as the Lakers' star drove to the basket. Bell earned a technical foul, his second of the game, and an automatic ejection. The Suns took game six in overtime, their first overtime win all season, despite 50 points from Bryant and Bell out serving a one-game suspension with last-second help from mid-season acquisition Tim Thomas. On their home court, the Suns won game seven 121–90, eliminating the Lakers for the first time since 1993. The Suns are 1 of 9 teams in NBA history to win a playoff series after being behind 3–1.

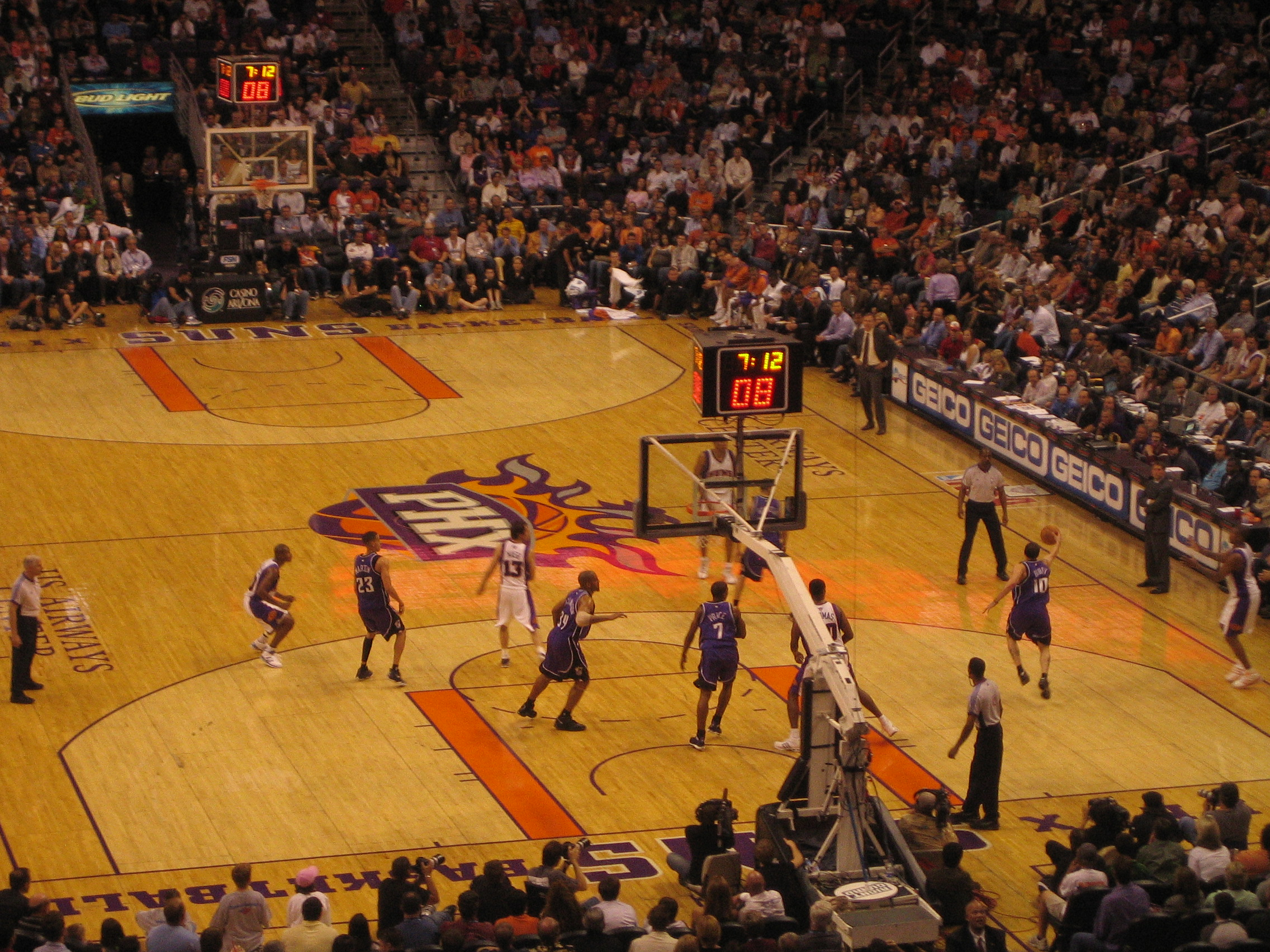
A home game against the Sacramento Kings in the 2006–07 season

In the second round, the Suns faced the Los Angeles Clippers. The series was played closely, with both teams trading games on each other's courts. The series was 2–2 and the Suns were behind in game five before coming back and won in double overtime. After a game six loss, the Suns won the series in the seventh game on their home court at US Airways Center, winning by a margin of 20 with an NBA record fifteen 3-point FGs on May 22, 2006.

They went on to play the Dallas Mavericks in the Western Conference finals as underdogs. The Suns took game one in Dallas by a single point and their May 30 victory in game four marked the most wins for the franchise in a conference finals series since the 1993 season. The Suns lost games five and six by a combined 25 points and were eliminated from the series on June 3.

==== 2006–2008: "Seven seconds or less" ====
Under coach D'Antoni, the Suns popularized the fast break offense known as 7 seconds or less, which was later published in a book written by Sports Illustrated writer Jack McCallum. Though criticized for a supposed lack of defense, the Suns specialized an efficient offense designed to quickly get off shots that made regrouping on defense difficult for the opposing team.

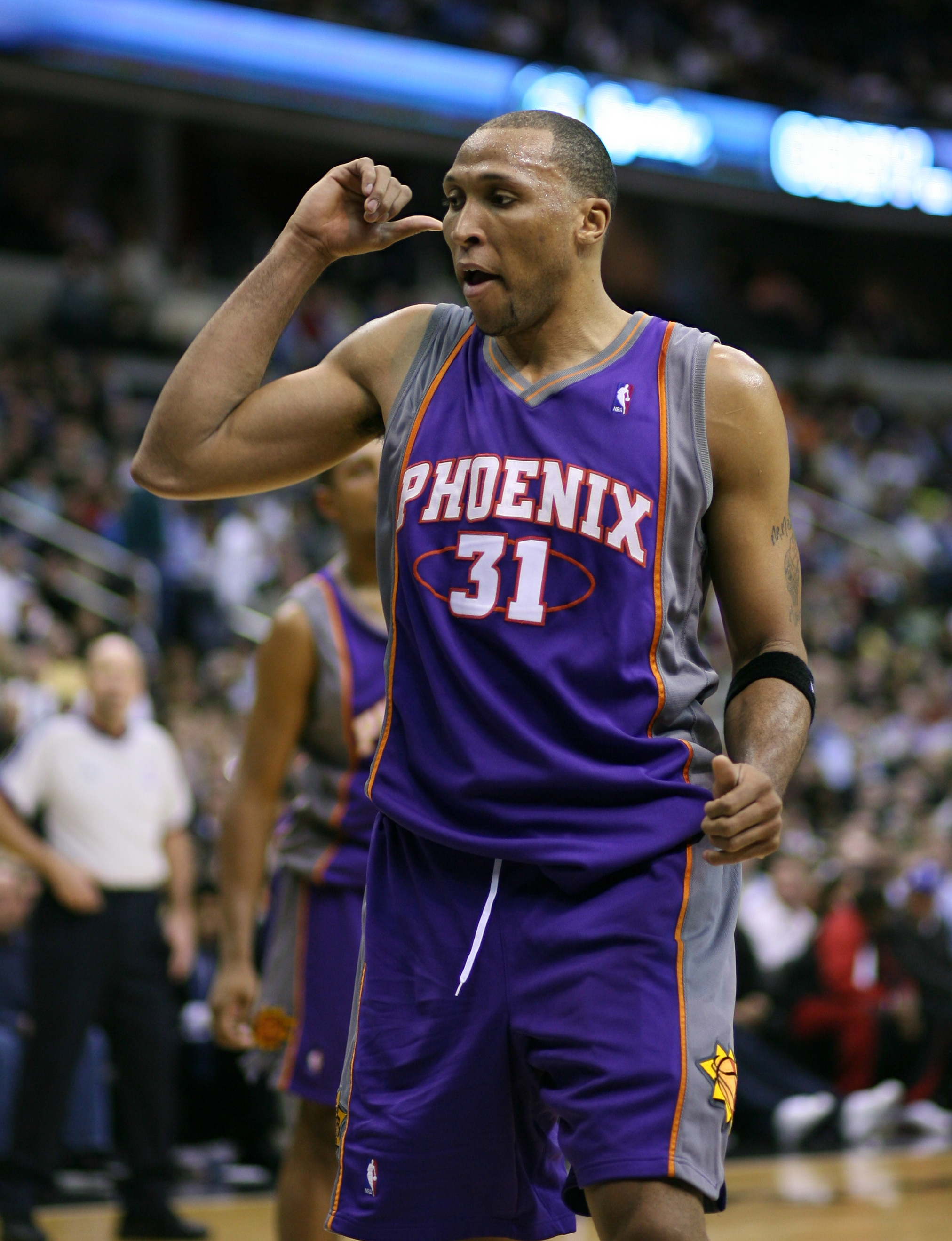
Shawn Marion, considered a key component of the "7 seconds or less" offense, was traded in 2008 after being drafted by the team in 1999

The Suns entered the 2006–07 season aiming to win the first championship in franchise history. From November 20 to December 22, the Suns posted a 15-game win streak, followed almost immediately with a 17-game win streak from December 29 to January 28. On March 14, the 49–14 Suns met the 52–10 Dallas Mavericks in a match-up where both teams were fighting for the top seed in the Western conference and Nash was going for his third consecutive MVP award against Dirk Nowitzki. Though the Suns won the game in double overtime, the Mavericks would finish with the West's top seed at 67–15, and Nowitzki would narrowly win the MVP award ahead of Nash.

While the Mavericks were upset in the first round by the eight-seed Golden State Warriors, the 61–21 Suns defeated Kobe Bryant and the Lakers in five games in the opening round of the playoffs. This set up a rematch of the 2005 Western Conference finals against the San Antonio Spurs. The series saw the Spurs defeat the Suns in six games, in what many called "the real finals" of the 2006–07 season. The Spurs went on to win the championship that year.

On June 6, former TNT TV analyst and NBA three-point specialist, Steve Kerr, was appointed Suns' general manager and president of basketball operations. Kerr was also a part of the Sarver-led investment group that purchased the franchise from Jerry Colangelo. His first off-season signing was former Orlando Magic small forward Grant Hill on a one-year $1.8 million deal with a player option for a second season at $2 million. Hill, who was previously considered injury-prone, played in the majority of games over the next four seasons as a starter.

The Suns finished 55–27 on the season, two games behind the Lakers who won the division. In the opening round of the playoffs, the Suns lost to the Spurs in five games, the first time they did not advance past the first round in the D'Antoni-Nash era. Some have attributed this to the mid-season acquisition of aging former MVP Shaquille O'Neal for four-time All Star Shawn Marion. Though O'Neal was brought in as a physical presence to match with the likes of the Spurs' Tim Duncan, the move all but ended their fast-paced offense which had brought them to the cusp of a Finals appearance.

On May 11, 2008, Suns' head coach Mike D'Antoni left the team and signed with the New York Knicks.

==== 2008–2010: Ups and downs ====
On June 9, 2008, Terry Porter was named head coach of the Phoenix Suns, succeeding Mike D'Antoni. Porter was an assistant coach of the Detroit Pistons when he was let go after the Pistons were eliminated by the Boston Celtics in the 2008 NBA Eastern Conference finals. During the off-season, the Suns had difficulties signing free agents because of being over the luxury tax. They made attempts to sign a backup point guard, Tyronn Lue; however, he decided to sign with the Bucks for more money. The Suns selected Robin Lopez (15th overall pick out of Stanford) in the 2008 NBA draft and acquired Goran Dragić, who was originally picked by the rival San Antonio Spurs.

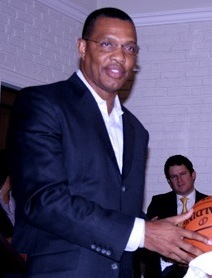
Alvin Gentry coached the Suns to a Western Conference finals appearance in 2010.

On February 16, 2009, the Suns fired Porter and he was succeeded by Alvin Gentry. The Suns were expected to make the transition back to the up-tempo style basketball nicknamed the "7 Seconds or Less" or "Run and Gun" style. On February 18, Gentry began his head coaching tenure with a 140–100 win over the Clippers at home. Six Suns players scored in double digits, led by Leandro Barbosa's 24 points. The Suns led by as much as 50 points during the game and were without their swingman Jason Richardson who was serving a one-game suspension. However, this offense cost them their defense, allowing over 107 points per game, 27th in the league. The Suns scored 140 in the next two games. On February 20, Amar'e Stoudemire underwent eye surgery and was out for eight weeks. They went 18–13 under Gentry in the last 31 games. At the end of the season, the Suns missed the playoffs with a 46–36 record.

During the 2009–10 season, the Suns played a far more balanced style of basketball and finished with a 54–28 record. The Suns advanced to the NBA's Western Conference finals, eliminating the Portland Trail Blazers in six games and the San Antonio Spurs in four games, including an explosive performance by Goran Dragić in game three against the Spurs, scoring 23 points in the fourth quarter. The Suns faced the Lakers in the Western Conference finals but lost in six games.

On June 15, 2010, Kerr resigned as general manager of the Suns and opted to return as an analyst for TNT effective June 30, 2010. In the wake of Kerr's decision to leave the club, senior vice president of basketball operations David Griffin told managing partner Robert Sarver he did not want to be a candidate to replace Kerr and left when his contract expired on June 30. The last moves of both Steve Kerr and David Griffin were drafting players Gani Lawal and Dwayne Collins with the second-round draft picks that they had in the 2010 NBA draft.

==== 2010–2012: Slow decline without Amar'e ====
The Suns attempted to re-sign Amar'e Stoudemire in the 2010 free agency period with a five-year contract for around $95 million, with $71 million guaranteed, and the rest of his salary coming only if certain conditions were held, such as getting guaranteed 4th and 5th-season money if he remained healthy enough to meet those conditions. Stoudemire instead signed with the New York Knicks for $100 million.

The Suns hired player agent Lon Babby as president of basketball operations. The team then paid over $80 million to acquire Hedo Türkoğlu, Josh Childress, and Hakim Warrick to not only replace Stoudemire but also add bench depth. On August 5, 2010, the Suns hired Lance Blanks as general manager. On December 19, 2010, the Suns acquired Vince Carter, Mickaël Piétrus, and Marcin Gortat from the Orlando Magic, along with a low draft pick and cash considerations. For this acquisition, the Suns traded Jason Richardson, Earl Clark, and the recently acquired Hedo Türkoğlu. On February 24, 2011, the Suns acquired point guard Aaron Brooks, trading first round (lottery-protected) draft pick and point guard Goran Dragić to the Houston Rockets. The Suns ended the 2010–11 season with a losing record and missed the playoffs.

In the 2011 NBA draft, the Suns used their 13th pick on Markieff Morris, a 6' 10" power forward from the Kansas Jayhawks. Markieff is the twin brother of Marcus Morris, who played together for three years in Kansas. In the 2012 NBA draft, the Suns used their 13th pick to select Kendall Marshall, a 6' 4" point guard from the North Carolina Tar Heels. Marshall was a prolific passer in his two seasons at North Carolina; setting the ACC and North Carolina season assist records, along with winning the Bob Cousy Award in his sophomore season with the Tar Heels.

=== 2012–2015: Pre–Booker and struggle years ===
Suns' Record: 2012–2015
Year	Wins	Losses	Seed #
2012	33	33	10th
2013	25	57	15th
2014	48	34	9th
2015	39	43	10th

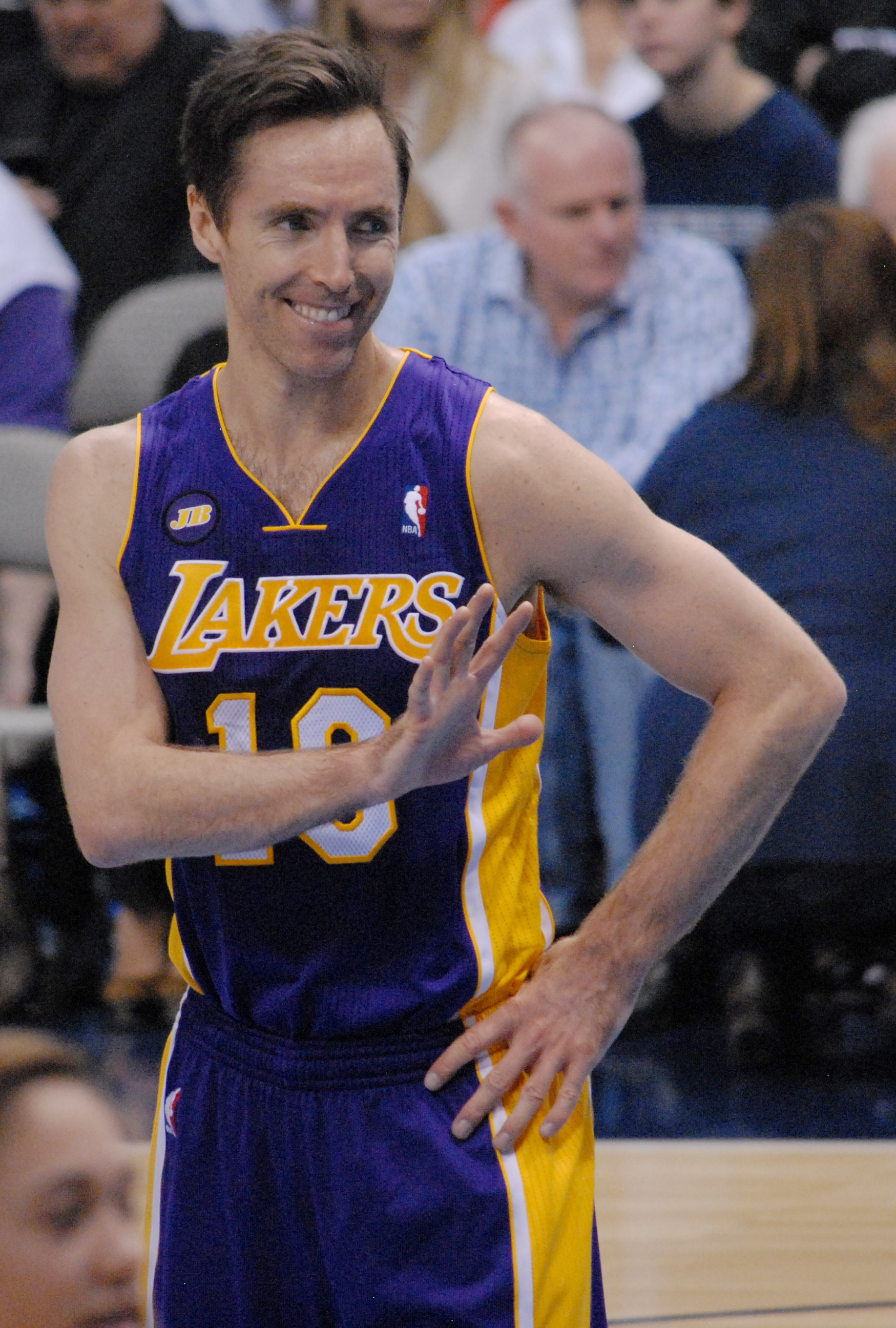
Steve Nash with the Lakers in 2012

==== 2012: The departure of Steve Nash ====
During the 2012 free agency period, the Suns traded Steve Nash to the Los Angeles Lakers in exchange for first-round picks in 2013 and 2015, as well as second-round picks in 2013 and 2014. After the trade, the Suns then re-acquired point guard Goran Dragić from Houston, signed Minnesota Timberwolves forward Michael Beasley, and claimed Houston forward Luis Scola off amnesty waivers while also using the same amnesty clause (as codified in the 2011 collective bargaining agreement) to waive Josh Childress. They also did a three-way trade with the New Orleans Hornets and the Timberwolves by trading Robin Lopez and Hakim Warrick to the Hornets and a 2014 second-rounder to the Timberwolves in exchange for Wesley Johnson, a top 14-protected future first-rounder and the rights to Brad Miller and Jerome Dyson. The latter two players' rights were later waived and the Suns then signed Jermaine O'Neal for one year. The Suns also signed P. J. Tucker based on his performance with the Suns' Summer League team. On September 20, it was announced that Channing Frye had dilated cardiomyopathy and as a result, he missed the entire 2012–13 season, although he sometimes made special appearances to do the pre-game show for local Suns games with Tom Leander and Tom Chambers. On January 12, 2013, the Suns became the fourth-fastest NBA team to win 2,000 games with a 97–81 road victory against the Chicago Bulls, which also marked the last victory for Alvin Gentry as head coach for the Suns. On January 18, 2013, the day after a loss that broke a 24-home-game winning streak against the Milwaukee Bucks, Gentry agreed to leave the Phoenix Suns organization. Two days later, player development coach Lindsey Hunter was named interim head coach role for the remainder of the season. A few days later, assistant head coaches Dan Majerle and Elston Turner had also resigned from their positions. On February 21, 2013, the Suns had traded their 2013 second-round pick to the Houston Rockets in exchange for Marcus Morris. The next day, the Suns traded point guard Sebastian Telfair to the Toronto Raptors in exchange for Iranian center Hamed Haddadi and a 2014 second-round pick. The Suns ended their first post-Steve Nash season with a 25–57 win–loss record, their second-worst record in franchise history behind only their inaugural season.

==== 2013: The arrival of Ryan McDonough ====
On April 22, 2013, it was announced that the Suns had fired general manager Lance Blanks. On May 7, 2013, former Celtics assistant general manager Ryan McDonough was announced as the new general manager of the Suns. On May 26, 2013, the Suns hired Jeff Hornacek as their head coach to replace interim head coach Lindsey Hunter. The team also started the new season with new modified logos, replacing most of the purple on their logos with black, although purple would still be found on their jerseys.

In the 2013 NBA draft on June 27, the Suns selected Ukrainian center Alex Len from Maryland with their 5th pick and power forward Alex Oriakhi from Missouri with their 57th pick. Although the Suns were expected to have a poor season, they began the season with a 19–11 record. Eric Bledsoe then went down against the Los Angeles Clippers with a torn meniscus and missed the following 33 games. The Suns went 17–16 during his absence led by Goran Dragić, keeping Phoenix in the playoff race with the Memphis Grizzlies and Dallas Mavericks. At 47–32, while Dallas and Memphis were both 48–32, Phoenix lost against both teams before they defeated the Sacramento Kings to finish the season 48–34. Dallas finished 49–33 and Memphis finished 50–32, resulting in Memphis finishing with the seventh seed, Dallas with the eighth, and Phoenix out of the playoffs.

During the 2014 NBA draft, the Suns drafted sophomore forward T. J. Warren from NC State, Canadian freshman point guard Tyler Ennis from Syracuse, Serbian shooting guard Bogdan Bogdanović, and senior center-power forward Alec Brown from Wisconsin-Green Bay. After trying to obtain players like LeBron James, Carmelo Anthony, and Chris Bosh, and losing Channing Frye to the Orlando Magic, the Suns decided to sign-and-trade for Sacramento Kings point guard Isaiah Thomas under a four-year contract worth $27 million in exchange for Alex Oriakhi, using a $7 million traded-player exception. On September 24, 2014, the Suns and Eric Bledsoe agreed on a five-year contract worth $70 million. A couple of days after, on September 29, 2014, they extended both Markieff and Marcus Morris to four-year deals that combine to $52 million, with Markieff earning $32 million and Marcus getting the remaining $20 million. Right before the trade deadline on February 19, 2015, the Suns made moves to change the roster. After demanding a trade due to lingering frustrations with the front office and direction of the team, Goran Dragić and his brother Zoran were traded by the Suns to the Miami Heat for Danny Granger and Miami's 2017 and 2021 first round picks in a three-team trade with the New Orleans Pelicans. Immediately after the trade, the Suns replaced Dragić by trading for Milwaukee Bucks guard Brandon Knight, sending Tyler Ennis and Miles Plumlee to Milwaukee and the Lakers' 2015 first round pick to the Philadelphia 76ers. Isaiah Thomas was then traded to the Boston Celtics for Marcus Thornton and the Cleveland Cavaliers' 2016 first round pick.

=== 2015–present: The Devin Booker era ===
==== 2015–2020: The arrival of Devin Booker and further struggle years ====
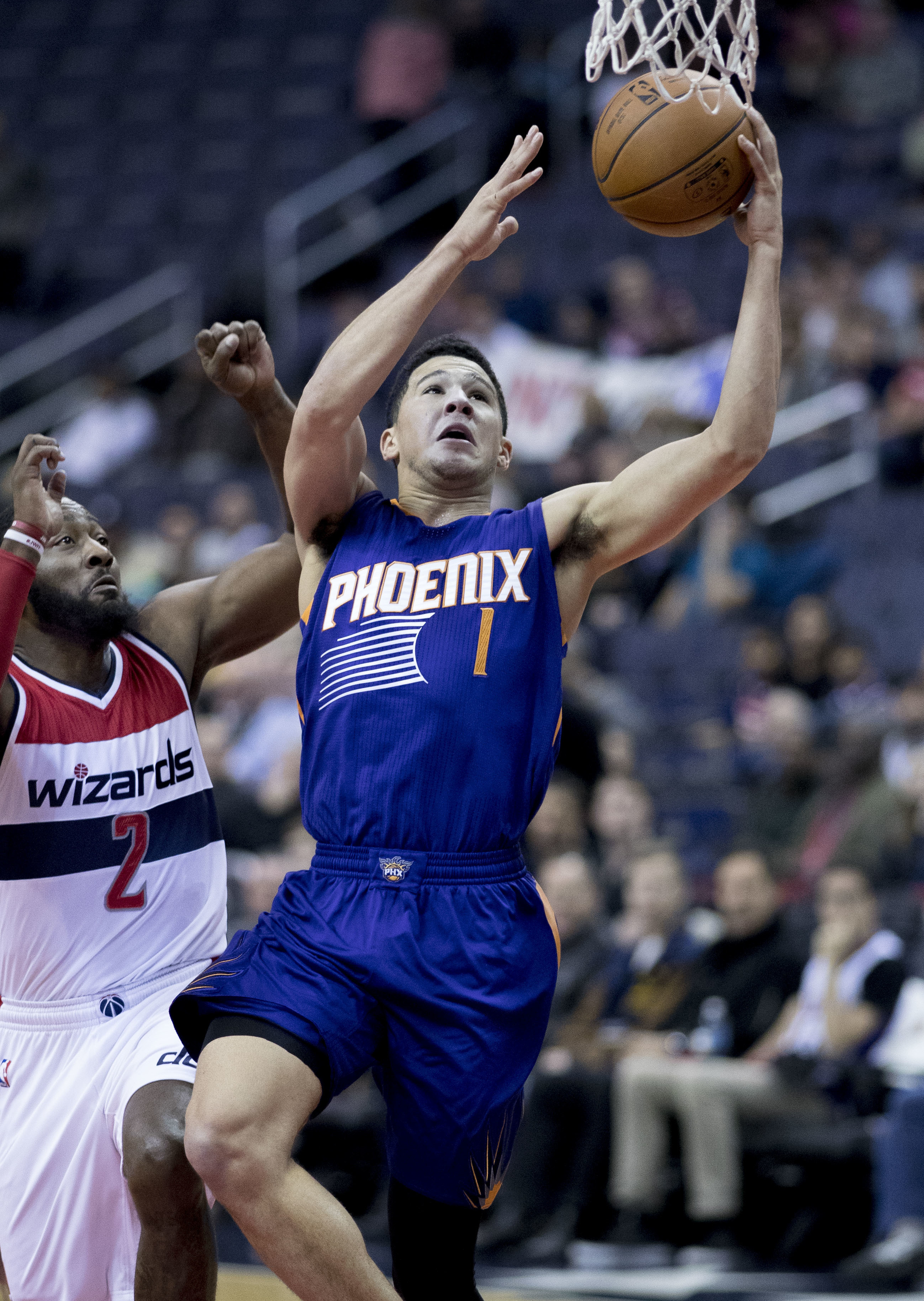
Devin Booker in 2016

In the 2015 NBA draft, the Suns drafted Kentucky shooting guard Devin Booker with the 13th pick. He was the youngest player drafted at the time by the Suns at 18-years-old and debuted two days before his 19th birthday against the Dallas Mavericks. On July 1, 2015, the Suns retained the rights of Brandon Knight under an offer similar to that of Eric Bledsoe's, and signed Dallas Mavericks center Tyson Chandler to a four-year deal worth $52 million. A day later, the Suns traded Markieff's brother Marcus Morris, Reggie Bullock, and Danny Granger to the Detroit Pistons in exchange for their 2020 second-round selection. However, star player Eric Bledsoe sustained a season-ending injury on December 26, 2015.

On February 1, 2016, the Suns relieved Jeff Hornacek of his duties as head coach. Former NBA player Earl Watson took on interim head coaching duties. The Suns traded the disgruntled Markieff Morris on February 19, 2016, to the Washington Wizards for Kris Humphries, DeJuan Blair, and the Wizards' first-round pick in the 2016 NBA draft. On March 14, 2016, the Suns were eliminated from playoff contention for a sixth straight season making it the longest drought in franchise history surpassing the five straight misses from the 1970–71 NBA season to the 1974–75 NBA season. However, rookie Devin Booker went from being a sixth-man off-the-bench player for Kentucky to future impact player after the injuries to Eric Bledsoe and Brandon Knight. He earned the team's first NBA All-Rookie Team honors since Amar'e Stoudemire back in 2003. Earl Watson officially became the full-time head coach on April 19, 2016, with his new assistant coaches Jay Triano, former Suns player Tyrone Corbin, Marlon Garnett, and Scott Duncan replacing most of the assistant coaches from the previous season. During the 2016 NBA draft, the Suns drafted the 18-year-old Bosnian-born Croatian forward-center Dragan Bender, Washington power forward Marquese Chriss, and Kentucky point guard Tyler Ulis; Chriss was acquired by trading the Suns' 13th and 28th selections, Bogdan Bogdanovic, and the Pistons' 2020 second-round pick to the Sacramento Kings. During the 2016 free agency period, the Suns regained former players and fan-favorites Jared Dudley and Leandro Barbosa under new deals.

While the Suns ended the 2016–17 season with only a slight improvement from their previous record despite the return of Eric Bledsoe, Devin Booker continued to improve in his second season with the team, leading the team in points scored at 22.1 per game. Marquese Chriss was also named to the All-Rookie Second Team that season. In the 2017 NBA draft, the Suns dropped to the 4th pick in the draft and selected Josh Jackson from the University of Kansas. On October 22, 2017, head coach Earl Watson was fired after a 0–3 start that included two losses of 40+ point deficits, which led to Jay Triano being promoted to interim head coach. On November 7, Bledsoe was traded to the Milwaukee Bucks in exchange for Greg Monroe and a protected first- and second-round draft pick. The Suns ended the season with the second-worst record in franchise history at 21–61. After the season concluded, the Suns let go of interim head coach Triano and hired Igor Kokoškov as the team's new head coach. The Suns earned their first no. 1 pick in the 2018 NBA draft lottery after ending the season with the league-worst record that year. With the first overall pick in the 2018 NBA draft, Phoenix selected Deandre Ayton. They would also trade up into the top 10 that year to take Mikal Bridges with the 10th pick from the Philadelphia 76ers, a draft pick the Suns already had from the Steve Nash trade before trading the pick to the 76ers in the Brandon Knight trade. In the off-season, Devin Booker signed a 5-year $158 million contract extension with the Suns.

Before the start of the regular season and during preseason on October 8, 2018, owner Robert Sarver decided to relieve Ryan McDonough from the general manager position, and named vice president of basketball operations James Jones and assistant general manager Trevor Bukstein as the interim general managers. A highlight of the season was when a planned three-way trade with the Washington Wizards and Memphis Grizzlies fell apart through miscommunication of the players involved and being sent in the planned deal.

The Suns would once again have another losing season as they missed the playoffs for the ninth straight season. At the end of the season, the Suns made James Jones the team's permanent general manager, with co-interim general manager Trevor Bukstein returning to his prior assistant general manager role. When the season came to an end, the coaching staff, including head coach Igor Kokoškov, were fired on April 23, 2019. Former New Orleans Hornets/Pelicans head coach and Philadelphia 76ers assistant coach Monty Williams was hired as the team's new head coach on May 3, and completed the rest of the new coaching staff on June 26. Phoenix finished with a 19–63 record, the worst in the Western Conference. Ayton made the All-Rookie First Team. The Suns had the third odds in the lottery but landed the sixth pick.

During the day of the 2019 NBA draft, the Suns agreed to deal T. J. Warren to the Indiana Pacers and their second-round pick (which would become KZ Okpala) to the Miami Heat for cash considerations. During the draft, they agreed to swap their sixth pick (which would become Jarrett Culver), trading down for the Minnesota Timberwolves' 11th pick (which would become Cameron Johnson) and Dario Šarić, and also agreeing to deal the Milwaukee Bucks' future first-round pick to the Boston Celtics for Aron Baynes and the draft rights to point guard Ty Jerome, as well as agree to a deal with undrafted Jalen Lecque. In the off-season they signed veteran point guard Ricky Rubio to a three-year deal, and re-signed Oubre to a two-year deal, signed Frank Kaminsky and Cheick Diallo.

The Suns played the Kings in their season opener on October 23, 2019, and won 124–95. On October 24, Ayton was suspended 25 games for failing a drug test. However, the Suns continued to play well, going 11–12 over their next 23 games.

On January 22, 2020, Larry Fitzgerald purchased a minority stake in the Suns, becoming the second active (at the time) NFL player with an NBA ownership share.

On February 13, 2020, NBA Commissioner Adam Silver announced that Devin Booker had been named as a reserve in the 2020 NBA All-Star Game, marking the first time since Steve Nash in 2012 that a Phoenix Suns player had been selected to the game. This later selection came as a result of an injury to Portland's Damian Lillard, who was unable to participate. Following the suspension of the 2019–20 NBA season, the Suns were one of the 22 teams invited to the NBA Bubble to participate in the final 8 games of the regular season. They went undefeated in the bubble, finishing 8–0, but failed to qualify for the playoffs for the 10th consecutive season. They finished the season with a record of 34–39.

==== 2020–2022: The arrival of Chris Paul and return to the playoffs ====
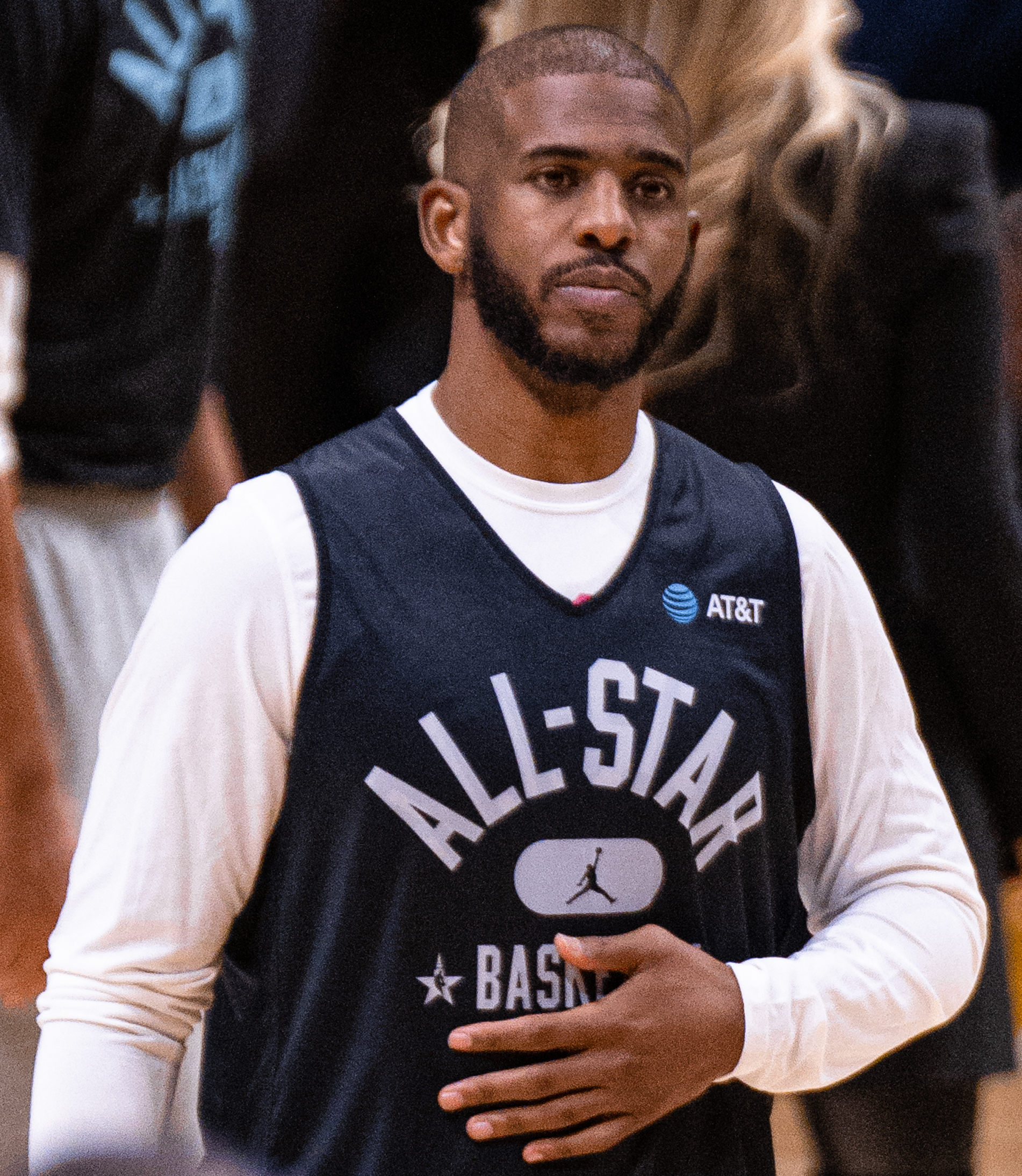
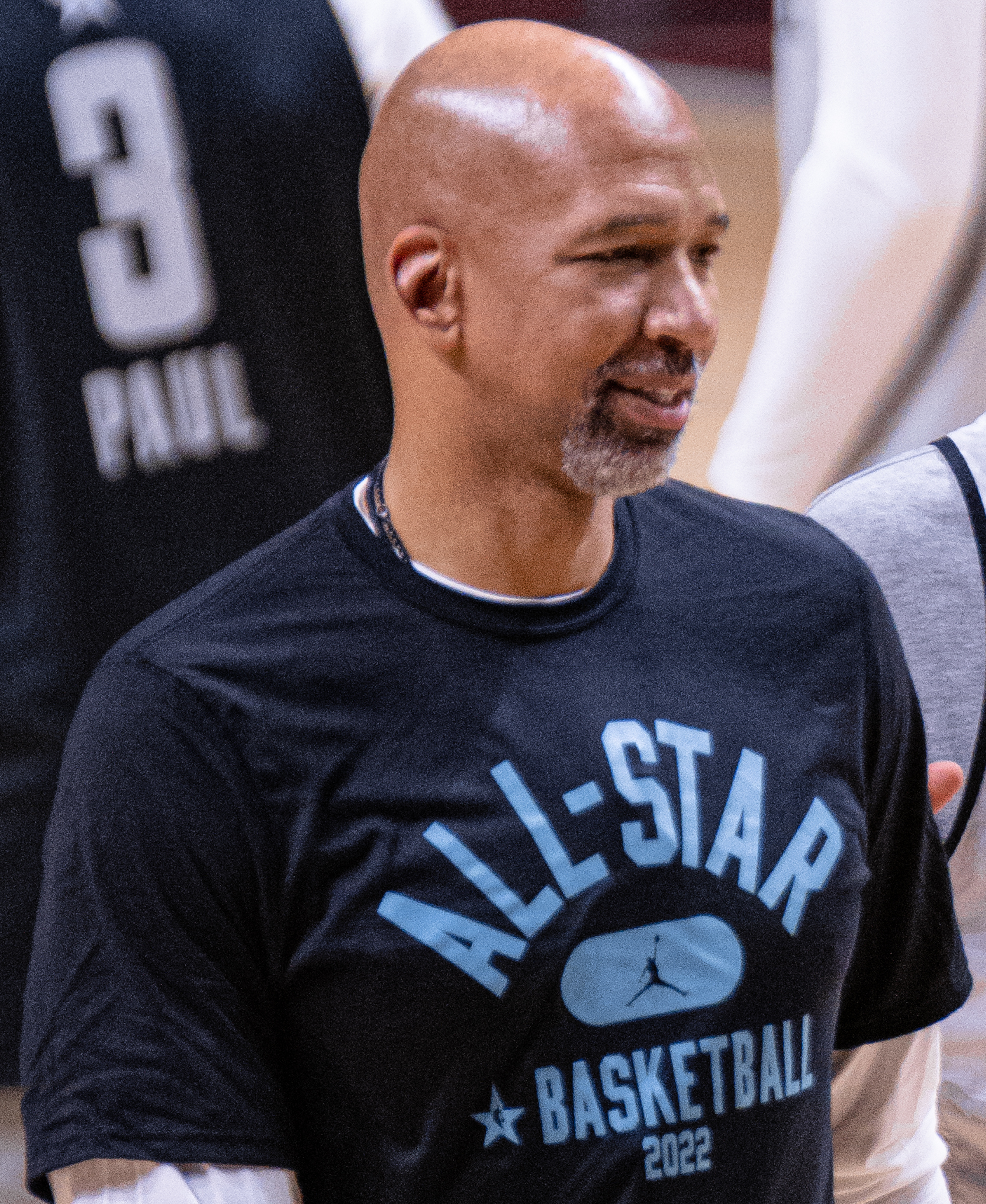
The acquisition of Chris Paul (left) and second-year head coach Monty Williams (right) helped guide the Suns to the 2021 NBA Finals, their first Finals appearance since 1993.

In the 2020 off-season, the Suns traded Kelly Oubre Jr., Ricky Rubio, Jalen Lecque, Ty Jerome, and a future first-round draft pick for 10-time All-Star, 10-time All-NBA, and nine-time All-Defensive point guard Chris Paul from the Oklahoma City Thunder. Phoenix also received small forward Abdel Nader. Both Devin Booker and Paul were named All-Star reserves for the 2020–21 NBA season. The Suns went on to have a 51–21 record (2nd best in the entire NBA), clinching the second seed in the Western Conference while head coach Monty Williams was named NBCA Coach of the Year. The Suns made the playoffs for the first time since 2010. The Suns faced the defending champions Los Angeles Lakers in the first round, defeating them in six games to win their first playoff series since 2010. The Suns then went on to sweep the Denver Nuggets, advancing the team to the Western Conference finals. Prior to the Western Conference finals, Paul entered into the NBA's COVID-19 health and safety protocols and missed the first two games of the series. On June 30, 2021, the Suns won the conference finals in six games against the Los Angeles Clippers to advance to the NBA Finals for the first time since 1993 after a 41-point performance by Paul. The Suns won the first two games of the Finals but ultimately lost the series 4–2 to the Milwaukee Bucks, led by two-time regular season MVP Giannis Antetokounmpo, who would be eventually named Finals MVP. Despite the loss, Booker set the NBA record for the most points scored by a player in his debut postseason. Paul was awarded All-NBA Second Team honors for his performance that season although he came up short in the finals. He was also the first player to lose all four playoff series in which his team led 2–0.

On July 29, 2021, the day of the 2021 NBA draft, the Suns traded guard Jevon Carter and the 29th pick to the Brooklyn Nets for guard Landry Shamet. In August, the Suns re-signed free agent center Frank Kaminsky and also signed veteran center JaVale McGee to a one-year deal. Starting point guard Chris Paul was re-signed to a partially guaranteed four-year deal.

After beginning the 2021–22 season with a 1–3 record, the Suns rattled off a winning streak that was capped off on December 2 with a 114–103 victory over the Detroit Pistons, which gave the Suns their 18th consecutive win to best the team's previous record of 17 games set in the 2006-07 season. On February 3, 2022, starting guards Devin Booker and Chris Paul were selected to reserve spots for the 2022 NBA All-Star Game. On February 10, the Suns traded second-year big man Jalen Smith and a second-round pick to the Indiana Pacers to reacquire wing Torrey Craig and acquired guard Aaron Holiday from the Washington Wizards for cash considerations at the NBA trade deadline. On March 10, the Suns became the first team that season to clinch a playoff berth after defeating the Miami Heat 111–90 on the road to claim their 53rd win. On March 24, the Suns clinched the NBA's top overall record with a 140–130 victory over the Denver Nuggets. In the 79th game of the season, the Suns set a new franchise record for wins with a 121–110 victory over the Los Angeles Lakers to tally their 63rd win on April 5, eliminating the Lakers from playoff contention in the process. The Suns finished the regular season with a record of 64–18 with Devin Booker finishing 4th in MVP voting. In the first round of the 2022 NBA playoffs, the Suns would defeat the New Orleans Pelicans in six games, before falling to the Dallas Mavericks in seven games in the second round despite holding a 2–0 series lead.

==== 2022–2025: Transition of ownership and the arrival of Kevin Durant ====
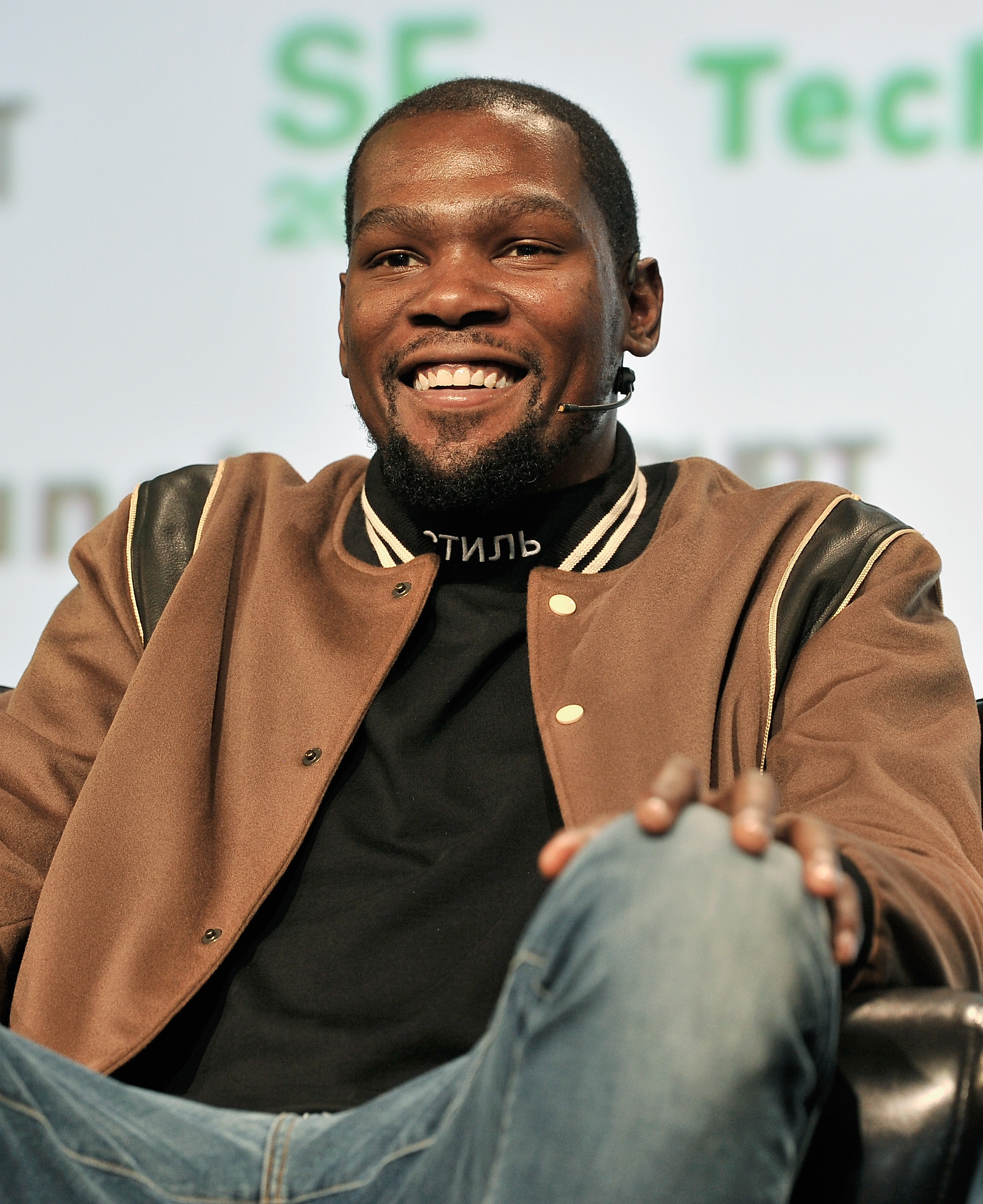
Kevin Durant is fifth on the NBA's all-time scoring list.

On September 13, 2022, the NBA fined owner Robert Sarver $10 million and suspended him for one year after an independent investigation determined that he used the "N-word" multiple times in public, as well as conduct that included "unequal treatment of female employees; sex-related statements and conduct; and harsh treatment of employees that on occasion constituted bullying." Both current and former NBA players, including LeBron James, Suns player Chris Paul, and Draymond Green, said that the punishment was too lenient, with Green requesting for a league vote to terminate Sarver as a league owner. On September 21, Sarver announced he would begin the process of selling both the Phoenix Suns and the Phoenix Mercury. Sarver eventually accepted the sale of both teams to United Wholesale Mortgage's CEO Mat Ishbia and his brother Justin for a record-high $4 billion purchasing price on December 20, 2022, with the move being made official on February 7, 2023. At 43 years old, Mat Ishbia became the second youngest team owner in league history.

During Ishbia's first few days of ownership, the Suns acquired 13-time All-Star and four-time scoring champion Kevin Durant, along with reacquiring T. J. Warren, from the Brooklyn Nets in exchange for Mikal Bridges, Cameron Johnson, Jae Crowder, four unprotected first-round picks, and a 2028 first-round pick swap. Durant had previously requested a trade during the 2022 offseason, with Phoenix being listed as one of Durant's preferred landing spots. Following the acquisition of Durant, the Suns' odds to win the NBA Finals surged from +1800 to +450 per BetMGM, trailing only the Boston Celtics at +350.

In the first round of the 2023 playoffs, the Suns would defeat the Los Angeles Clippers in five games. In the second round of the 2023 playoffs against the Denver Nuggets, the Suns lost the first two games to Denver, as Chris Paul suffered a groin injury in game 2. The Suns came back to win the next two games at home without Chris Paul, as Devin Booker and Kevin Durant became the first duo in NBA playoff history to each record 35 points, five rebounds, and five assists in consecutive playoff games. However, after dropping game 5 in Denver, Phoenix went on to lose the series to the Nuggets in six games, as they trailed by 30 points at halftime in an elimination game at home for the second straight season. Following their series loss to the Nuggets, the Suns dismissed head coach Monty Williams after four seasons with the team. Williams finished his Phoenix tenure with a record of 194–115 (.628) in the regular season and 27–19 in the playoffs. Subsequently, the Suns hired Frank Vogel as their new head coach on June 6, 2023.

On June 24, Phoenix acquired veteran guard Bradley Beal from the Washington Wizards in a three-team deal also involving the Indiana Pacers, with the Suns sending Chris Paul, Landry Shamet, five future second-round picks, four future pick swaps and cash considerations to Washington and one future second-round pick to Indiana. Just before the start of the regular season on September 27, the Suns traded Deandre Ayton and rookie Toumani Camara to the Portland Trail Blazers in a three-way deal that sent 7-time All-Star Trail Blazers guard Damian Lillard to the Milwaukee Bucks, in exchange for Milwaukee shooting guard Grayson Allen and Portland center Jusuf Nurkić. After starting the 2023–24 season with multiple injuries and a 14–15 record, the Suns went 35–18 the remainder of the season and were one of five teams to rank in the top 10 offensively and defensively during that span. They finished with a 49–33 record, securing the sixth seed in the 2024 NBA playoffs and clinching their fourth consecutive playoff appearance. However, they were promptly swept in the first round by the Minnesota Timberwolves, marking the first time the Suns were swept in a playoff series in 25 years. On May 9, 2024, Vogel was fired after one season with Phoenix. Two days later, the Suns hired Mike Budenholzer, who previously coached the Milwaukee Bucks and defeated the Suns in the 2021 NBA Finals, as their 22nd head coach in team history.

The Suns opened the 2024–25 season with the highest payroll in the league, with hefty salaries coming from their big three of Booker, Durant, and Beal. Phoenix opened out to an 8–1 start, but following a slump where the team went 6–16, coach Budenholzer elected to remove Beal and Nurkić from the starting lineup on January 6, 2025. Nurkic saw his playing time drastically reduced, and he was traded a month later. On February 3, Booker surpassed Walter Davis to become the Suns' all-time leading scorer in a game against the Portland Trail Blazers. With Phoenix's postseason hopes dwindling, Durant injured his ankle on March 30 in a game against the Houston Rockets that kept him out for the remainder of the season. The Suns lost nine of their last 10 games to end the season, finishing with a 36–46 record and the 11th spot in the Western Conference, failing to make the playoffs for the first time since the 2019–20 season. Shortly after the season concluded, Budenholzer was fired, and owner Mat Ishbia described the season as a failure, with intentions of creating a cultural reset of the franchise.

==== 2025–present: Post Kevin Durant era ====
Following a 2024–25 season marked by financial mismanagement and on-court failures—including a bloated payroll, the benching of star players, a missed playoff berth, and the firing of the head coach—the Suns underwent a major front-office overhaul. General manager James Jones was replaced by Brian Gregory, and Cleveland Cavaliers assistant coach Jordan Ott was named the Suns' head coach for the 2025–26 campaign. With an aging roster, the organization shifted its focus to building a younger, more athletic team around Devin Booker. On July 6, 2025, the Suns traded Kevin Durant to the Houston Rockets in a seven-team deal, receiving guards Jalen Green and Dillon Brooks, the draft rights to center Khaman Maluach, forward Rasheer Fleming, guard Koby Brea, and a 2026 second-round pick in return. Phoenix also acquired center Mark Williams from the Charlotte Hornets in exchange for Vasa Micić, the draft rights to Liam McNeeley, and a 2029 first-round pick. On July 16, ten days after trading Durant, the Suns bought out the final two years of Bradley Beal's contract, clearing the way for him to sign with the Los Angeles Clippers. Hindered by a massive salary and a no-trade clause, Beal's acquisition is widely considered one of the most detrimental moves in franchise history, as Phoenix failed to win a single playoff game in two seasons with Booker, Durant, and Beal together. With Durant and Beal gone, the Suns committed to Booker, signing him to a two-year, $145 million maximum extension through the 2029–30 season, setting a record for the highest annual extension salary in NBA history.

== Season-by-season record ==
List of the last five seasons completed by the Suns. For the full season-by-season history, see List of Phoenix Suns seasons.

Note: GP = Games played, W = Wins, L = Losses, W–L% = Winning percentage

Season	GP	W	L	W–L%	Finish	Playoffs
2021–22	82	64	18	.780	1st, Pacific	Lost in conference semifinals, 3–4 (Mavericks)
2022–23	82	45	37	.549	2nd, Pacific	Lost in conference semifinals, 2–4 (Nuggets)
2023–24	82	49	33	.598	2nd, Pacific	Lost in first round, 0–4 (Timberwolves)
2024–25	82	36	46	.439	5th, Pacific	Did not qualify
2025–26	82	45	37	.549	2nd, Pacific	Lost in first round, 0–4 (Thunder)

== Home arenas ==
The Suns played at the Arizona Veterans Memorial Coliseum from 1968 until 1992. In 1992, they moved to America West Arena, referred to as "The Purple Palace". Although not without controversy, eventually the Phoenix City Council and the Suns Organization together completed renovation on the arena in 2021.

== Uniform history ==
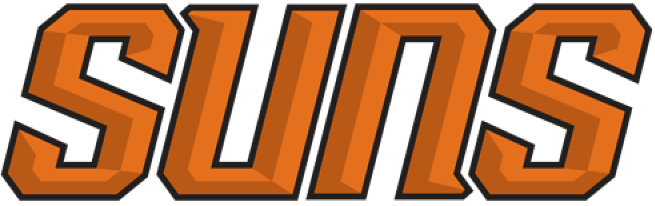
The Phoenix Suns' current wordmark logo.

=== 1968–1973: Original uniforms ===
After the NBA had awarded a franchise to the Phoenix metropolitan area in 1968, local designers chose purple and orange as the main colors for the Phoenix Suns' uniforms. The original uniforms featured a futuristic "Phoenix" wordmark in front plus block numbers and letters in orange with purple and white trim. An orange sunburst logo was added on the sides of the shorts.

=== 1973–1992: Western look ===
The Suns tweaked their uniforms for the 1973–74 season. Other than the basic template itself, only the lettering and numbers were changed from the original uniforms. The "Phoenix" wordmark and numbers were modified to a Western-style font, with a few changes to the treatment of the player's name at the back.

=== 1992–2000: Streaking Sun look ===
In time for the move to the America West Arena for the 1992–93 season, the Suns overhauled their look. The home white and road purple uniforms now feature the "Streaking Sun" logo in the chest with "Suns" on top and the number at the bottom. The shorts feature the word "Phoenix" in orange letters written diagonally on the left leg. Prior to the 1994–95 season, the Suns introduced a black alternate uniform featuring the same template.

=== 2000–2013: Seven Seconds or Less look ===
Before the 2000–01 season, the Suns changed to a more simplistic uniform style. The home white uniform had the word "Suns", the numbers in purple with orange trim, and purple side stripes. The road purple uniform had the word "Phoenix" and the numbers in white with orange trim along with grey side stripes. An orange alternate uniform, with the abbreviation "PHX" and the numbers in white with purple trim along with grey side stripes, arrived prior to the 2003–04 season. All three uniforms featured the updated "Streaking Sun" alternate logo on the stripes while the players' numbers were seen on the left leg until the 2005–06 season.

=== 2013–2017: Updated Streaking Sun look ===
The Suns overhauled their uniforms anew prior to the 2013–14 season. The look was inspired from their previous uniform designs. The home white uniforms featured "Suns" in orange with black trim along with black numbers, orange streaks and grey and orange sunbursts. The purple road uniforms featured "Phoenix" in white with orange trim along with orange numbers, white streaks and black, grey and orange sunbursts. The orange alternate uniforms (sleeved from 2013 to 2015; sleeveless from 2015 to 2017) featured "Suns" in white with black trim along with black numbers, white streaks and black and dark orange sunbursts.

During the 2014–15 season, the Suns added a grey-sleeved alternate uniform. The uniform has "Phoenix" and the numbers in black with orange trim. The "Phoenix" wordmark was a callback to the "Western" look of the 1970s and 1980s. A black alternate uniform was also added prior to the 2015–16 season. The black uniforms featured "PHX" in black with white trim along with white numbers and purple and orange trim.

=== Since 2017: Switch to Nike ===
When the NBA switched to Nike beginning with the 2017–18 season, the Suns drastically revamped their uniforms. Gone was the modernized "Streaking Sun" and the sunburst of the previous uniforms, and the Suns returned to a more simplified design. Purple also returned as a prominent color. The home-and-away designations were eliminated and in its place were the white "Association" uniform, the primary color "Icon" uniform, the secondary color "Statement" uniform and the annual "City" uniform.

The Suns' "Association" uniforms featured "Suns" in orange and the numbers in purple. The purple "Icon" uniforms featured "Phoenix" in grey and the numbers in orange. The black "Statement" uniform featured "PHX" in grey and the numbers in orange. All three uniforms have the "Streaking Sun" logo on the beltline.

Starting with the 2019–20 season, the Suns replaced the black uniform with a new orange uniform, featuring the "Streaking Sun" logo in front, the numbers in white, and the "PHX" abbreviation on the beltline. They wore the orange "Statement" uniform until the 2021–22 season, after which the Suns released a black "Statement" uniform with design elements inspired by the popular "City" uniforms worn in the 2020–21 and 2021–22 seasons (see below).

In the 2023–24 season, the Suns updated their purple "Icon" and white "Association" uniforms, revisiting the 1990s "Streaking Sun" look. The set featured the "Suns" wordmark inside the "Streaking Sun" instead of above the logo unlike its 1990s predecessors. Grey accents were eliminated, and orange drop shadows on the numbers were added.

The Suns unveiled a new "Statement" uniform for the 2025–26 season. The design remained black with purple and orange trim, but featured a purple/orange "Streaking Sun" gradient silhouette that runs through the shorts. The "Phoenix" wordmark was written diagonally with the chest numbers on the bottom left, and the "Suns" diagonal wordmark was placed on the right leg.

==== Los Suns special uniforms ====
The Suns started wearing special "Noche Latina" uniforms in 2007 to commemorate the Latin American fanbase. The 2007 edition used the home white uniform template with the flag of Latin American countries substituting for the orange stripes. Starting in 2008, the Suns began to wear a modified version of their orange alternate uniforms with "Los Suns" in front, which they kept until 2013.

During the 2010 NBA playoffs, the Suns wore their "Los Suns" uniforms on Cinco de Mayo for Game 2 of the Western Conference semifinals against the San Antonio Spurs. Sports reporter Dave Zirin called the "Los Suns" action an "unprecedented political statement by a sports team." The move was also widely reported to be a protest of an Arizona illegal-immigration law enacted in April.

After the 2013 rebrand, the Suns wore a black sleeved uniform with "Los Suns" in white with orange trim along with Latin-inspired accents at the back. This lasted only one season, however, as the Suns introduced a modified version of their purple uniforms in 2015, albeit with "Los Suns" in place of "Phoenix". This version lasted until 2017.

For 2018, Nike added a fourth uniform option, the "City" uniform. The Suns used the occasion to unveil a new version of the "Los Suns" uniform, albeit using only purple, grey and white. Unlike in previous years where the "Los Suns" uniform was worn only during the month of March, this uniform was first used during the month of January. For 2019, the "Los Suns" uniform added orange trim on the letters and stylized black piping while moving the front numbers to the left chest. It also featured a recolored Arizona flag in Suns colors on the shorts and "SOMOS PHX" slogan above the uniform tag. The 2020 version kept the same template albeit with black as the base color and purple as the trim color.

==== City Edition: "The Valley" ====
The 2020–21 Nike NBA Suns City Edition artwork makes tribute to the Phoenix valley region. The uniform features a black base, and pixelated mountain view sunset with an inspired rainbow of yellow, orange, red and purple. The image is based on Camelback Mountain located in North Phoenix. Camelback Mountain is a geographical identifier of The Valley, which has been the nickname of the Phoenix valley for decades. The front of the uniform reads "The Valley" in custom script lettering across a sunset themed rainbow over Camelback Mountain.

Even though the NBA commemorated the league's 75th anniversary by having teams release mashup designs of previous uniforms for the 2021–22 "City" edition, the Suns elected to keep their "The Valley" uniforms for another season. These uniforms would also return for the 2025–26 season, as part of the NBA's "City Remixed" uniform program.

A Spanish-language edition ("El Valle") served as the "City" uniform in the 2023–24 season. The predominantly grey uniform with sunrise number gradients and purple stripes pay tribute to the city's Chicano fanbase.

"The Valley"-themed "City" uniform returned for the 2024–25 season, incorporating the classic "Western" font the team used from 1973 to 1992, and was heavily based on the uniforms used in the 1995 NBA All-Star Game held in Phoenix.

==== City Edition: Salute to Native American Culture ====
The Suns went with a Native American motif for their 2022–23 "City" uniform, featuring a turquoise base, black letters, red trim, and indigenous art designs on the striping.

== Mascot ==
=== The Gorilla -- 'GO' ===
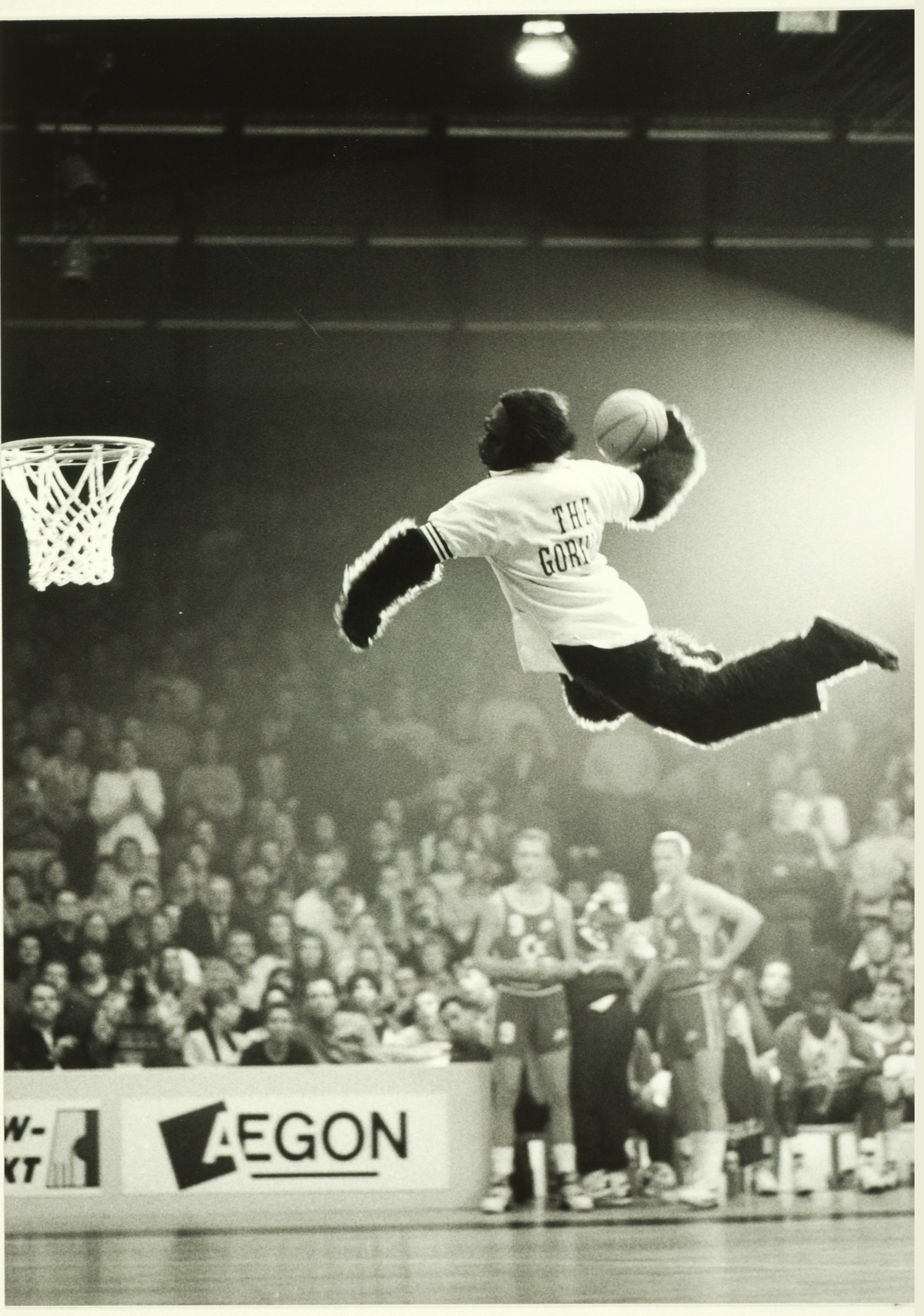
The Gorilla, mascot of the Phoenix Suns

Barring a brief, early attempt involving a sunflower costume, the Suns had no official mascot for the first 11 seasons of their existence. This changed when a messenger for Eastern Onion, a singing telegram service, delivered a telegram at Veterans Memorial Coliseum dressed as a gorilla. As he began to leave, Coliseum security suggested he do a few dances underneath the basket during a timeout. The fans loved it, as did the messenger, Henry Rojas, who kept coming to games until he was officially invited to be part of the team. Nicknamed "Go", the Gorilla has a fictional background story consisting of coming from the Banana Republic and earning an education at Furman University.

As Rojas's announced retirement from the role following the 1987-88 NBA season, the Suns held open auditions and try-outs to find a new Gorilla. Former Arizona State University national champion gymnast Bob Woolf immediately stood out with his more acrobatic, aerial take on the character, particularly impressing evaluators when he jumped off a trampoline onto a basketball hoop, pulled himself atop the raised fixture, and danced high above the rim. Woolf took over the role, introducing the Gorilla's signature slam dunk routines, backflips, and slapstick during games, such as running the stadium stairs to the Rocky theme. He became the first NBA mascot to incorporate Evel Knievel-inspired daredevil stunts like jumping through a ring of fire or being propelled to the hoop via catapult or grapple wire. He was also the first NBA mascot to ride a Harley-Davidson to courtside and integrate elaborate comedy sketches with costumes and props in his routine. The Gorilla soon became one of the most famous mascots in the NBA, his popularity in the '90s resulting in his inclusion as a hidden character in NBA Jam.

The Gorilla appeared on WWE Raw on March 17, 1998, where he was on the receiving end of a chokeslam and tombstone piledriver by Kane.

Woolf performed as The Gorilla until the 2005–06 season, with Devin Nelson briefly taking over until end of the 2011–12 season, as Woolf then resumed the role until 2021. Rojas, the original telegram Gorilla, has since been involved in numerous charity projects. Woolf prefers to keep his relative anonymity, saying off-camera in a 2014 feature for SportsCenter, "I don't want to be seen. I don't want to be known. I want the character to take center stage."

The Gorilla was inducted into the Mascot Hall of Fame in 2005 and still makes appearances with charities, schools, hospitals and local businesses.

== Media ==
On television, Suns games not aired exclusively by one of the league's national television partner are carried on broadcast television by Gray Media's Arizona's Family Sports network, which is affiliated with KPHE-LD in Phoenix, KAZF 32 in Flagstaff, KAZS 27 in Yuma, and KOLD-TV 13.5 in Tucson. Selected games also air on Gray's Phoenix independent station KTVK. Games are also carried on an over-the-top subscription streaming service known as Suns Live, in partnership with Kiswe.

The contract succeeds a previous agreement with regional sports network (RSN) Bally Sports Arizona (formerly Fox Sports Arizona), which first assumed rights to Suns home games in 2003, and added exclusive rights to away games beginning in the 2011–12 season (away games had previously been carried by KUTP). Suns owner Mat Ishbia stated that the agreements would give Suns fans "more options and access than they’ve ever had", explaining in an interview that moving from the RSN model to free-to-air television would help counter the trend of cord cutting and increase the Suns' potential audience to three million households via Gray's state-wide coverage.

The contract was initially blocked by a lawsuit by Bally Sports' parent company, Diamond Sports Group (which had recently filed for chapter 11 bankruptcy protection) in April 2023. Diamond accused the team of breaching its contract and bankruptcy law, stating that the team was making an "improper effort" to "change their broadcasting partner without permitting Diamond to exercise our contractual rights." Diamond sued the Suns over the Gray agreement, and the contract was voided by the bankruptcy court in accordance with an automatic stay. The stay did not impact a related agreement for rights to its WNBA sister team, the Phoenix Mercury. Diamond was ultimately allowed to exercise its right of first refusal, but did not make an offer before the deadline lapsed; as a result, the Suns' and Gray formalized the new broadcasting agreement on July 14, 2023. In May 2026, the team renewed its contract with Gray through 2030; the renewal will also see Gray take digital rights for the Suns and Mercury in-house via the upcoming Arizona's Family Sports app; the Suns had achieved the fourth-highest regional television audience in the lead, and the team was reportedly close to recuperating the $36 million value of its previous contract with Bally Sports.

98.7 KMVP-FM serves as flagship station of the Suns Radio Network. Al McCoy served as the team's play-by-play announcer and "Voice of the Suns" from 1972 to 2023, making him the longest-tenured broadcaster in NBA history. He was awarded the Curt Gowdy Media Award at the 2007 Naismith Memorial Basketball Hall of Fame induction ceremony, and was inducted into the Suns' Ring of Honor in 2016. The 2021–22 season marked McCoy's 50th season with the team. For 50 consecutive seasons (barring remote broadcasts due to COVID-19), Al McCoy was positioned at courtside, adjacent to the Suns' home bench, as recent as May 2022. He stopped broadcasting road games in 2019 due to difficult vantage points at higher locations in other NBA arenas limiting his preferred style of descriptive play-by-play. On October 2, 2022, his broadcast position was moved higher up in the arena, closer to the skybox-area of the Footprint Center. Tim Kempton serves as analyst, while Jon Bloom handles play-by-play for road games not broadcast by McCoy.

Television broadcasts formerly featured a simulcast of McCoy's radio commentary, but this was dropped in 2003 in favor of dedicated commentary teams for radio and television. Studio host Tom Leander initially served as the television play-by-play announcer. As of the 2022–23 season, Kevin Ray and Leander split play-by-play duties, with either former Sun Eddie Johnson or Ann Meyers Drysdale on color. Eddie Johnson has been the Suns TV analyst since 2000, paired initially with McCoy until the discontinuation of radio simulcasts.

== Personnel ==
=== Current roster ===
Phoenix Suns roster
Players

Pos.	No.	Player	Height	Weight	DOB	From
G	15	Devin Booker	6 ft 5 in (1.96 m)	206 lb (93 kg)	1996-10-30	Kentucky
G	17	Jamaree Bouyea	6 ft 2 in (1.88 m)	180 lb (82 kg)	1999-06-27	San Francisco
F	22	Miles Bridges	6 ft 7 in (2.01 m)	225 lb (102 kg)	1998-03-21	Michigan State
G/F	3	Dillon Brooks	6 ft 7 in (2.01 m)	225 lb (102 kg)	1996-01-22	Oregon
F	0	Ryan Dunn	6 ft 7 in (2.01 m)	216 lb (98 kg)	2003-01-07	Virginia
F	20	Rasheer Fleming	6 ft 9 in (2.06 m)	240 lb (109 kg)	2004-07-10	Saint Joseph's
G	12	Collin Gillespie	6 ft 1 in (1.85 m)	195 lb (88 kg)	1999-06-25	Villanova
G	23	Jordan Goodwin	6 ft 3 in (1.91 m)	215 lb (98 kg)	1998-10-23	Saint Louis
G	4	Jalen Green	6 ft 4 in (1.93 m)	186 lb (84 kg)	2002-02-09	Prolific Prep (CA)
F	11	Oso Ighodaro	6 ft 11 in (2.11 m)	235 lb (107 kg)	2002-07-14	Marquette
G	8	Luke Kennard	6 ft 5 in (1.96 m)	206 lb (93 kg)	1996-06-24	Duke
C	10	Khaman Maluach	7 ft 1 in (2.16 m)	250 lb (113 kg)	2006-09-14	Duke
F	18	Koa Peat	6 ft 8 in (2.03 m)	235 lb (107 kg)	2007-01-20	Arizona
C	26	Duop Reath (TW)	6 ft 10 in (2.08 m)	245 lb (111 kg)	1996-06-26	LSU
G	61	Pat Spencer (TW)	6 ft 2 in (1.88 m)	205 lb (93 kg)	1996-07-04	Northwestern
F	2	Drew Timme (TW)	6 ft 9 in (2.06 m)	235 lb (107 kg)	2000-09-09	Gonzaga
C	25	Mark Williams (injured)	7 ft 1 in (2.16 m)	240 lb (109 kg)	2001-12-16	Duke

Coaches
Head coach
- Jordan Ott
Assistant(s)
- Chaisson Allen
- DeMarre Carroll
- Sean Dwyer
- John Little
- Jesse Mermuys
- Mike Muscala
- Brian Randle

Legend
- (DP) Unsigned draft pick
- (FA) Free agent
- (S) Suspended
- (GL) On assignment to G League affiliate
- (TW) Two-way affiliate player
- Injured

Roster
Updated: October 19, 2026

=== Retained draft rights ===
The Suns hold the draft rights to the following unsigned draft picks who have been playing outside the NBA. A drafted player, either an international draftee or a college draftee who is not signed by the team that drafted him, is allowed to sign with any non-NBA teams. In this case, the team retains the player's draft rights in the NBA until one year after the player's contract with the non-NBA team ends. This list includes draft rights that were acquired from trades with other teams.

Draft	Round	Pick	Player	Pos.	Nationality	Current team	Note(s)	Ref

== Hall of Famers, retired and honored numbers ==
=== Ring of Honor and retired numbers ===
Phoenix Suns Ring of Honor
No.	Player	Position	Career
5*	Dick Van Arsdale	G	1968–1977 ^{1}
6*	Walter Davis	G	1977–1988
7*	Kevin Johnson	G	1988–1998, 2000
9*	Dan Majerle	F	1988–1995, 2001–2002 ^{2}
13*	Steve Nash	G	1996–1998, 2004–2012
24*	Tom Chambers	F	1988–1993
31*	Shawn Marion	F	1999–2008
32*	Amar'e Stoudemire	F	2002–2010
33*	Alvan Adams	C	1975–1988 ^{3}
34*	Charles Barkley ^{4}	F	1992–1996
42*	Connie Hawkins	F	1969–1973
44*	Paul Westphal	G	1975–1980, 1983–1984 ^{5}
	Al McCoy	Broadcaster	1972–2023
—	Jerry Colangelo	Owner; Coach; Executive	1968–2004
—	Cotton Fitzsimmons	Coach	1970–1972, 1988–1992, 1996
—	John MacLeod	Coach	1973–1987
—	Joe Proski	Trainer	1968–2000

Notes:

- ^{*} Retired number
- ^{1} Also served as interim head coach in 1987.
- ^{2} Also served as assistant head coach (2008–2013).
- ^{3} Number was temporarily unretired for Grant Hill (2008–2012).
- ^{4} Was named one of the NBA's 50 Greatest Players in 1996.
- ^{5} Also served as assistant head coach (1988–1992) and head coach (1992–1996).
- The NBA also retired Bill Russell's No. 6 for all its member teams on August 11, 2022.

=== Phoenix Suns' All-Century Team ===
The Suns' All-Century Team was voted on by the fans:

Phoenix Suns All-Century Team
First Team
No.	Name	Position	Tenure
7	Kevin Johnson	G	1988–1998, 2000
32	Jason Kidd	G	1996–2001
34	Charles Barkley	F	1992–1996
24	Tom Chambers	F	1988–1993
33	Alvan Adams	C	1975–1988
—	Paul Westphal	Coach	1992–1996
Second Team
No.	Name	Position	Tenure
44	Paul Westphal	G	1975–1980; 1983–1984
9	Dan Majerle	G	1988–1995; 2001–2002
42	Connie Hawkins	F	1969–1973
6	Walter Davis	F	1977–1988
41	Mark West	C	1987–1994; 1999–2000
—	Cotton Fitzsimmons	Coach	1970–1972; 1988–1992, 1996

=== 40th Anniversary Team ===
The 40th Anniversary Suns Team, selected by fans through an Internet vote, was unveiled on January 3, 2008. The same night the Suns defeated the Seattle SuperSonics, 104–96, to celebrate the team's 40th season. The Suns' inaugural game in 1968 was against the Sonics.

Phoenix Suns 40th Anniversary Team
No.	Player	Position	Career
5	Dick Van Arsdale	G	1968–1977
7	Kevin Johnson	G	1988–1998, 2000
13	Steve Nash	G	1996–1998; 2004–2012
6	Walter Davis	F	1977–1988
44	Paul Westphal	G	1975–1980; 1983–1984
9	Dan Majerle	G/F	1988–1995; 2001–2002
42	Connie Hawkins	F/C	1969–1973
24	Tom Chambers	F	1988–1993
34	Charles Barkley	F	1992–1996
31	Shawn Marion	F	1999–2008
1; 32	Amar'e Stoudemire	F/C	2002–2010
33	Alvan Adams	C	1975–1988

=== Basketball Hall of Famers ===
Phoenix Suns Hall of Famers
Players
No.	Name	Position	Tenure	Inducted
42	Connie Hawkins	F/C	1969–1973	1992
25	Gail Goodrich	G	1968–1970	1996
34	Charles Barkley ^{1}	F	1992–1996	2006
13	Gus Johnson ^{2}	F/C	1972	2010
3; 24	Dennis Johnson ^{2}	G	1980–1983	2010
32	Shaquille O'Neal	C	2008–2009	2016
33	Charlie Scott	G	1972–1975	2018
13	Steve Nash	G	1996–1998; 2004–2012	2018
32	Jason Kidd^{5}	G	1996–2001	2018
33	Grant Hill	G/F	2007–2012	2018
44	Paul Westphal ^{3}	G	1975–1980; 1983–1984	2019
6	Walter Davis ^{2}	G/F	1977–1988	2024
25	Vince Carter	G/F	2010–2011	2024
32; 1	Amar'e Stoudemire	F/C	2002–2010	2026
Contributors
Name		Position	Tenure	Inducted
Jerry Colangelo ^{4}		General manager Owner	1968–2004	2004
Rick Welts		President	2002–2011	2018
Cotton Fitzsimmons ^{2}		Head coach	1970–1972; 1988–1992; 1996	2021
Mike D'Antoni ^{6}		Assistant coach Head coach	2002–2003; 2003–2008	2026

Notes:

- ^{1} In total, Barkley was inducted into the Hall of Fame twice – as player and as a member of the 1992 Olympic team.
- ^{2} Inducted posthumously.
- ^{3} He also served as assistant head coach from 1988 to 1992, and head coach from 1992 to 1996.
- ^{4} He also coached the team in 1970 and 1972 to 1973, and was the owner of the team from 1987 to 2004.
- ^{5} In total, Kidd was inducted into the Hall of Fame twice – as player and as a member of the 2008 Olympic team.
- ^{6} In total, D'Antoni was inducted into the Hall of Fame twice – as contributor and as a member of the 2008 Olympic team.

=== FIBA Hall of Famers ===
Phoenix Suns Hall of Famers
Players
No.	Name	Position	Tenure	Inducted
32	Shaquille O'Neal	C	2008–2009	2017
13	Steve Nash	PG	1996–1998; 2004–2012	2020
19	Hedo Türkoğlu	F	2010	2026

== Executive personnel ==
=== Owners ===
Ownership history
Owner	Tenure
Karl Eller, Don Pitt, Don Diamond, Bhavik Darji, Marvin Meyer, and Richard L. Bloch (also part Andy Williams, Bobbie Gentry and Ed Ames)	1968–1987
Jerry Colangelo	1987–2004
Robert Sarver	2004–2022
Sam Garvin*	2022–2023
Mat Ishbia	2023–present

*Sam Garvin took on the role of interim team governor during the 2022–23 NBA season, effectively taking on most ownership responsibilities for Robert Sarver while he served his season-long suspension in the NBA. Mat Ishbia officially took over the Suns and Phoenix Mercury on February 7, 2023.

=== General managers ===
GM history
GM	Tenure
Jerry Colangelo	1968–1995
Bryan Colangelo	1995–2006
Mike D'Antoni	2006–2007
Steve Kerr	2007–2010
Lance Blanks	2010–2013
Ryan McDonough	2013–2018
James Jones & Trevor Bukstein*	2018–2019
James Jones	2019–2025
Brian Gregory	2025–present

*During the 2018–19 NBA season, both James Jones and Trevor Bukstein were given the roles of interim general managers for the entirety of that season after Ryan McDonough was fired before the start of their regular season period at the time. After that season concluded, Jones was given the permanent general manager role while Bukstein was demoted back to his original position of assistant general manager for the Suns.

Ryan Resch came out in 2022 while working as vice president of strategy and evaluation for the Phoenix Suns, making him the first openly gay person in league history to work basketball operations in an NBA front office.

== NBA Outdoors ==
The Suns held an annual basketball exhibition game, the NBA Outdoors, every first weekend of October in Indian Wells Tennis Garden in Indian Wells, California, near the city of Palm Springs from 2008 to 2010. However, the club ceased playing the outdoor preseason game prior to the 2011–12 NBA preseason.

As a result of a recommendation by the Coachella Valley Recreation and Park District's Superintendent of Operations, Craig DeWitt, the NBA held its first outdoor exhibition basketball game on October 11, 2008. That stadium facility was built primarily for tennis tournaments and music concerts, and it can hold up to 15,000 fans. The Phoenix Suns lost the game to the Denver Nuggets. A second annual outdoor exhibition game was played on October 10, 2009, this time the Suns lost to the Golden State Warriors. On October 9, 2010, the Suns beat the Dallas Mavericks in the third annual outdoor exhibition.

In 2008 and 2009 pre-seasons, the Suns held training camp in the Auditorium in La Quinta, California, and the College of the Desert Gymnasium in Palm Desert, California, alongside the Portland Trail Blazers. But in 2010, the Suns began their training in San Diego and the Trail Blazers in Tucson, Arizona, as well held exhibition games in Seattle, Washington.
